= Helen Mary Jones =

Plaid Cymru politician

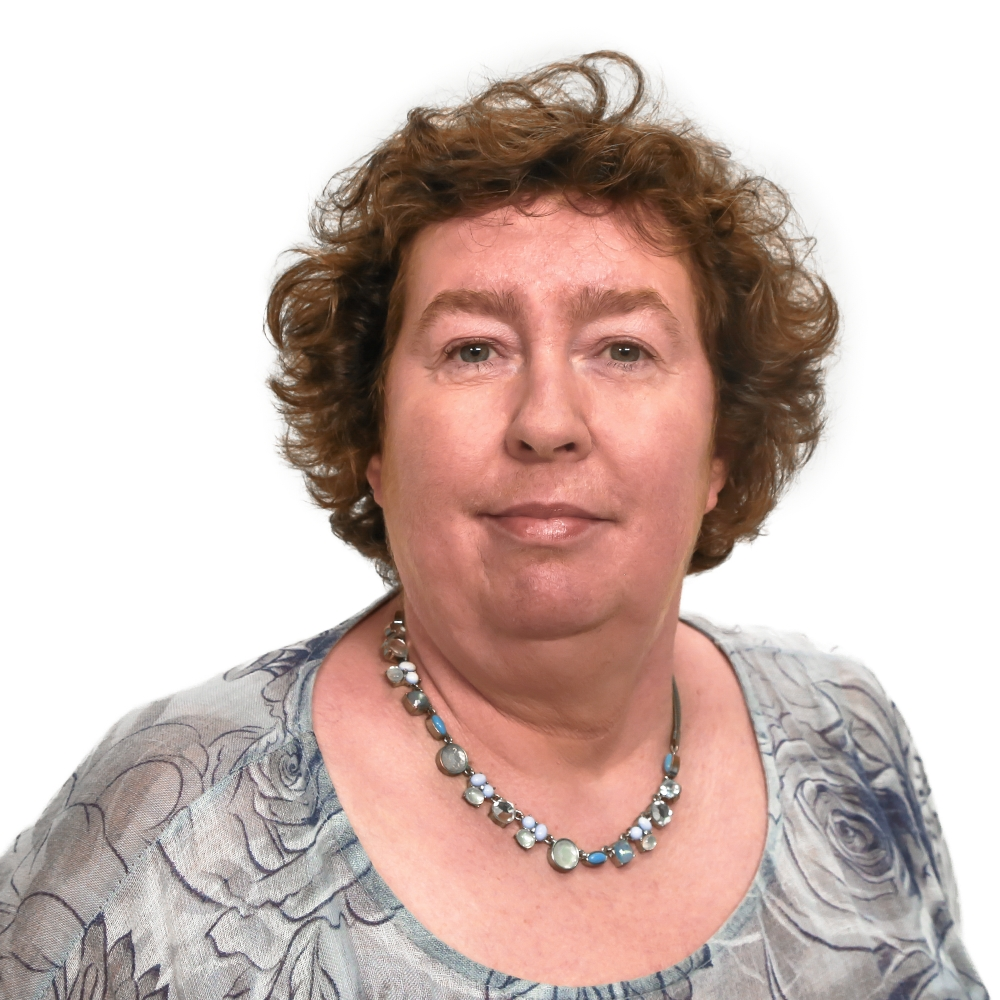

Deputy Leader of Plaid Cymru
- In office 2008–2012
- Leader: Ieuan Wyn Jones; Leanne Wood
- Preceded by: Alun Ffred Jones
- Succeeded by: Elin Jones

Member of the Senedd for Mid and West Wales
- In office 2 August 2018 – 29 April 2021
- Preceded by: Simon Thomas
- Succeeded by: Jane Dodds
- In office 1 May 2003 – 3 May 2007
- Preceded by: Cynog Dafis
- Succeeded by: Nerys Evans

Member of the Senedd for Llanelli
- In office 3 May 2007 – 5 May 2011
- Preceded by: Catherine Thomas
- Succeeded by: Keith Davies
- In office 6 May 1999 – 1 May 2003
- Preceded by: Office created
- Succeeded by: Catherine Thomas

Personal details
- Born: 29 June 1960 (age 66) Colchester, England
- Party: Plaid Cymru (until 2025)
- Education: Aberystwyth University

Helen Mary Jones (born 29 June 1960) is a Welsh Plaid Cymru politician, who was a member of the Senedd from 1999 to 2011 and again from 2018 to 2021.

== Background ==
Jones was born in Colchester, Essex. She was educated at Colchester County High School for Girls, Caereinion High School in Powys and the University of Wales, Aberystwyth, where she was awarded an honours degree in history and a Postgraduate Certificate in Education. She has taught in the special education field and has held various positions in youth, community and social work.

Jones is dyslexic and dyspraxic, which she did not disclose during her time as an additional needs teacher. She told WalesOnline: "I hid the problem from my colleagues, but not from the kids. I thought it might help the children if they knew that somebody who was a teacher and, in their eyes successful, had problems too."

== Political career ==
Jones was the deputy leader of Plaid Cymru from 2008 to 2012. Her political interests include environmental issues, social justice, equal opportunities, children's rights and employment.

She unsuccessfully contested the 1992 general election in Islwyn, as a joint Plaid Cymru-Green Party candidate, against the then leader of the Labour Party, Neil Kinnock. She further unsuccessfully contested the 1997 general election in Montgomeryshire. In 1999 she was elected to the new National Assembly for Wales for the constituency of Llanelli. Prior to being elected as AM for Llanelli she was Senior Development Manager with the Equal Opportunities Commission in Wales.

She was Shadow Minister for Education and Lifelong Learning, and a member of the Education and Lifelong Learning Committee, the Equality of Opportunity Committee, the South West Wales Regional Committee and also a member of the Voluntary Sector Partnership during the first term of the National Assembly.

She stood in the 2000 and 2003 Plaid Cymru leadership elections, losing to Ieuan Wyn Jones in both elections.

In the 2003 elections to the Senedd she lost her constituency seat in Llanelli by just 21 votes, but was nevertheless elected for the Mid and West Wales "top-up" region. She was the Shadow Minister for the Environment, Planning and Countryside in the Second Assembly (2003–07). During the 2007 elections to the Senedd she won back the Llanelli constituency with a majority of 3,884 votes. She lost her seat to Labour's Keith Davies by 80 votes in the 2011 election.

Jones is a member of the Ministerial Advisory Board sent in to Pembrokeshire County Council by the Welsh Government to support and challenge as they improve safeguarding after damaging inspection reports.

She was elected National Chair of Plaid Cymru in September 2011. Two months later, she was appointed Chief Executive of Youth Cymru, a voluntary organisation supporting youth work in Wales. She held this position until September 2017.

In October 2014, it was announced she would be Plaid's candidate for Llanelli at the 2016 Assembly election. In the 2016 National Assembly for Wales election, she lost to the Labour candidate Lee Waters by 382 votes.

Jones returned to the Senedd in August 2018 to represent Mid and West Wales following the resignation of Simon Thomas. During the COVID-19 pandemic, as Acting Chair of the Culture, Welsh Language and Communications Committee, she praised efforts to continue promoting the language.

At the 2021 Senedd election, Jones' share of the vote in Llanelli declined by nearly 8% to 8,255 votes (27.3%), while Lee Waters was returned with an increased majority. Additionally, Jones sought re-election as a regional member, being placed second on Plaid's list. However, only top candidate Cefin Campbell was elected.

== Controversies ==
=== Suicide reference ===
In March 2019, Jones said in the Senedd that if the Conservative Mark Isherwood "wants more rope to hang himself with, then I'm happy to provide him with it". The statement was the subject of a formal complaint by Labour's Jack Sargeant, whose father Carl hanged himself. Jones apologised for her words.

=== Contempt of court ===
On 18 February 2021, Jones was reprimanded in court for having shared a tweet from a domestic abuse campaigner, about the suspect in an ongoing murder trial, which could have influenced the jury had they seen it. The judge, who said "On the face of it, it amounts to a clear contempt of court", chose not to invoke a summary procedure for contempt of court against Jones or the tweet's original author. The Senedd's acting standards commissioner found Jones's actions to have breached Members' code of conduct.

=== Accusations of transphobia ===
Since 2018, Jones has been repeatedly accused of transphobia. In April 2018, at an event organised by the campaign group Woman's Place UK, she questioned whether a rise in the number of "women and girls wanting to transition to the opposite sex" has been caused by pressure to look a certain way fuelled by social media. Following this, Youth Cymru, of which Jones was the chief executive from November 2011 until September 2017, released a statement distancing themselves from her views and saying that she was no longer associated with the organisation.

In May 2018, she tweeted, "Gender critical feminists are not attacking trans people. We are asking questions." In another tweet, she said she was "concerned, like many people including trans people, about the possible impacts of the proposed changes to the Gender Recognition Act and the rights of women and girls". In December 2020, she shared a tweet criticising those who stated transgender people were also victims in the Holocaust and still felt discriminated against.

On 3 March 2021, Plaid Cymru member Owen Hurcum resigned as candidate for the 2021 Senedd election. Hurcum, who is non-binary and was due to be the fourth Plaid candidate on the North Wales regional list, said that they "cannot in good conscious stand as a candidate for Plaid whilst they continue to platform a candidate who has promoted, and continues to promote, transphobia". Hurcum also claimed that Jones' comments and "the lacklustre response from the party leadership" had resulted in "many members of the party [leaving] in recent months". Plaid leader Adam Price said "action [had] been taken" over comments made by Jones and insisted that Plaid had a "very clear policy in favour of trans equality and indeed our manifesto will have the most radical commitment ever in achieving trans equality".

Senedd
New post	Member of the Senedd for Llanelli; 1999 – 2003	Succeeded by Catherine Thomas
Preceded by Cynog Dafis	Member of the Senedd for Mid and West Wales; 2003 – 2007	Succeeded by Nerys Evans
Preceded by Catherine Thomas	Member of the Senedd for Llanelli; 2007 – 2011	Succeeded by Keith Davies
Preceded by Simon Thomas	Member of the Senedd for Mid and West Wales; 2018 – 2021	Succeeded by Cefin Campbell
