= Swansea West =

Swansea West may refer to:

- Swansea West (UK Parliament constituency)
- Swansea West (Senedd constituency)
