= Catherine Thomas (disambiguation) =

Catherine Thomas (born 1963) is a Welsh politician.

Catherine Thomas (or similar) may also refer to:

- Katherine Thomas (born 1966), musician
- Catherine of Palma (1533–1574), Spanish saint

== See also ==
- Thomas (surname)
