= David Lloyd (Welsh politician) =

Welsh politician (born 1956)

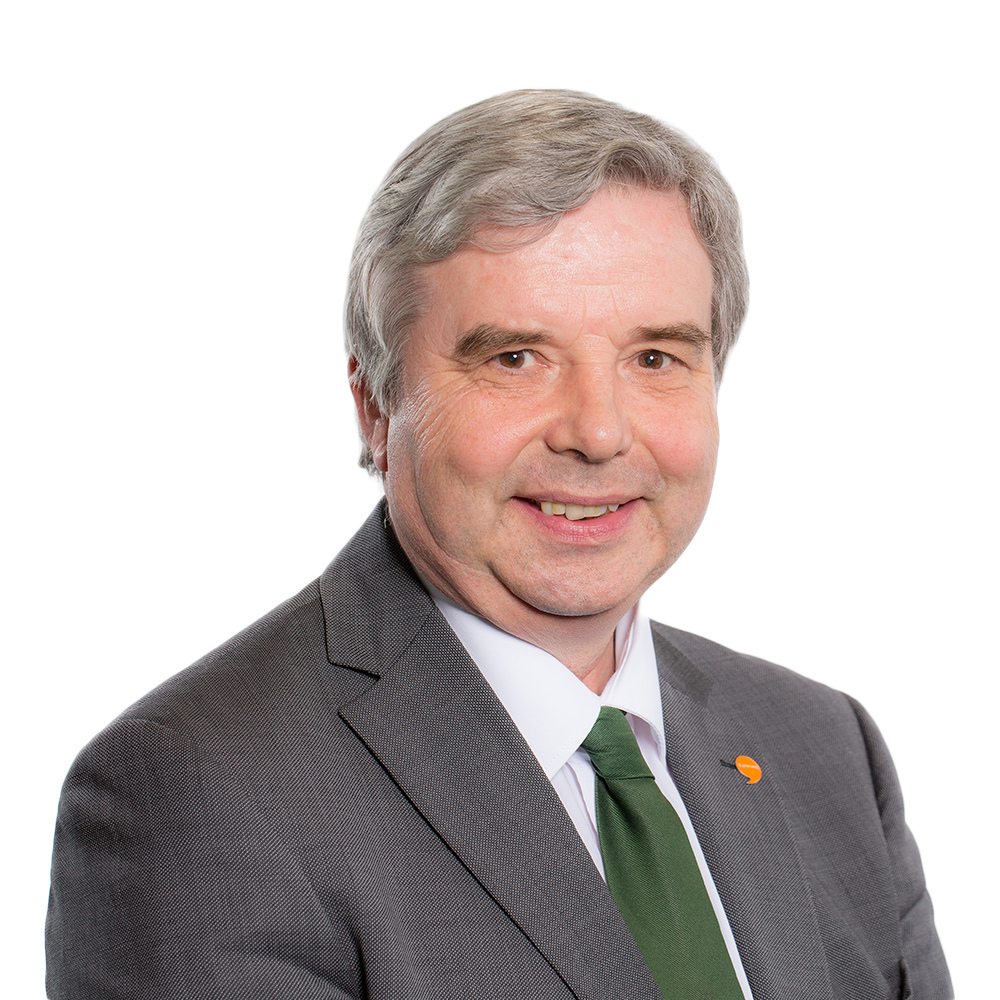

Member of the Senedd for South Wales West
- In office 6 May 2016 – 29 April 2021
- Preceded by: Altaf Hussain
- Succeeded by: Altaf Hussain
- In office 6 May 1999 – 30 March 2011
- Preceded by: New seat
- Succeeded by: Byron Davies

Personal details
- Born: David Rees Lloyd; 2 December 1956 (age 69) Tywyn, Gwynedd, Wales
- Party: Plaid Cymru
- Spouse: Catherine Lloyd
- Children: 3
- Education: University of Wales
- Occupation: Politician
- Profession: General Practitioner

David Rees "Dai" Lloyd (born 2 December 1956 in Tywyn, Gwynedd) is a retired Welsh politician and GP. He was the Plaid Cymru Member of the Senedd for South Wales West from 1999 to 2011 and again between 2016 and 2021.

Lloyd was latterly Plaid Cymru's Shadow Secretary for Culture and Infrastructure, as well as being Chair of the Plaid Cymru Senedd Group and Chair of the Senedd Health, Social Care, and Sport Committee.

== Education ==
Lloyd is a graduate of the University of Wales, College of Medicine, Cardiff (1980). MB BCh (1980) MRCGP (1989) Dip. Ther (1995). Awarded an Honorary Fellowship, FRCGP, by the Royal College of Physicians in 2001.

== Professional career ==
Lloyd was a general practitioner by profession until retiring from practice in November 2019. He temporarily returned in April 2020 following the COVID-19 outbreak.

== Political career ==
Lloyd began his political career in Swansea where he worked as a GP. In 1995 he sought election for Cockett ward, hitherto regarded as a Labour stronghold. He made gains at the election, coming close to beating Labour. At a subsequent by-election, however, he was elected as a councillor. In 1999 he held the seat and topped the poll.

He was the Senedd Member for South Wales West from 1999 until 2011, when Plaid failed to win the second seat on the regional list. He served as Shadow Finance Minister for Plaid Cymru in the National Assembly. In 2012, he unsuccessfully sought to regain his former seat in the Cockett ward on Swansea Council. He was again unsuccessful at a by-election in 2015.

He returned to the Senedd as a Member for South Wales West following the May 2016 election. He announced his decision to only stand in a constituency at the 2021 Senedd election and not on the list, he stood and finished 3rd with 14.5% in Swansea West in doing so he qualified for a resettlement grant of £31,622 as he was an unsuccessful candidate, something he was criticised for during the campaign. He also received £41,815.44 when he was defeated in 2011.

== Offices held ==
Senedd
| Preceded by (new post) | Member of the Senedd for South Wales West; 1999–2011 | Succeeded by Byron Davies |
| Preceded by Altaf Hussain | Member of the Senedd for South Wales West; 2016-2021 | Succeeded by Altaf Hussain |
