= Keith Davies =

Welsh politician

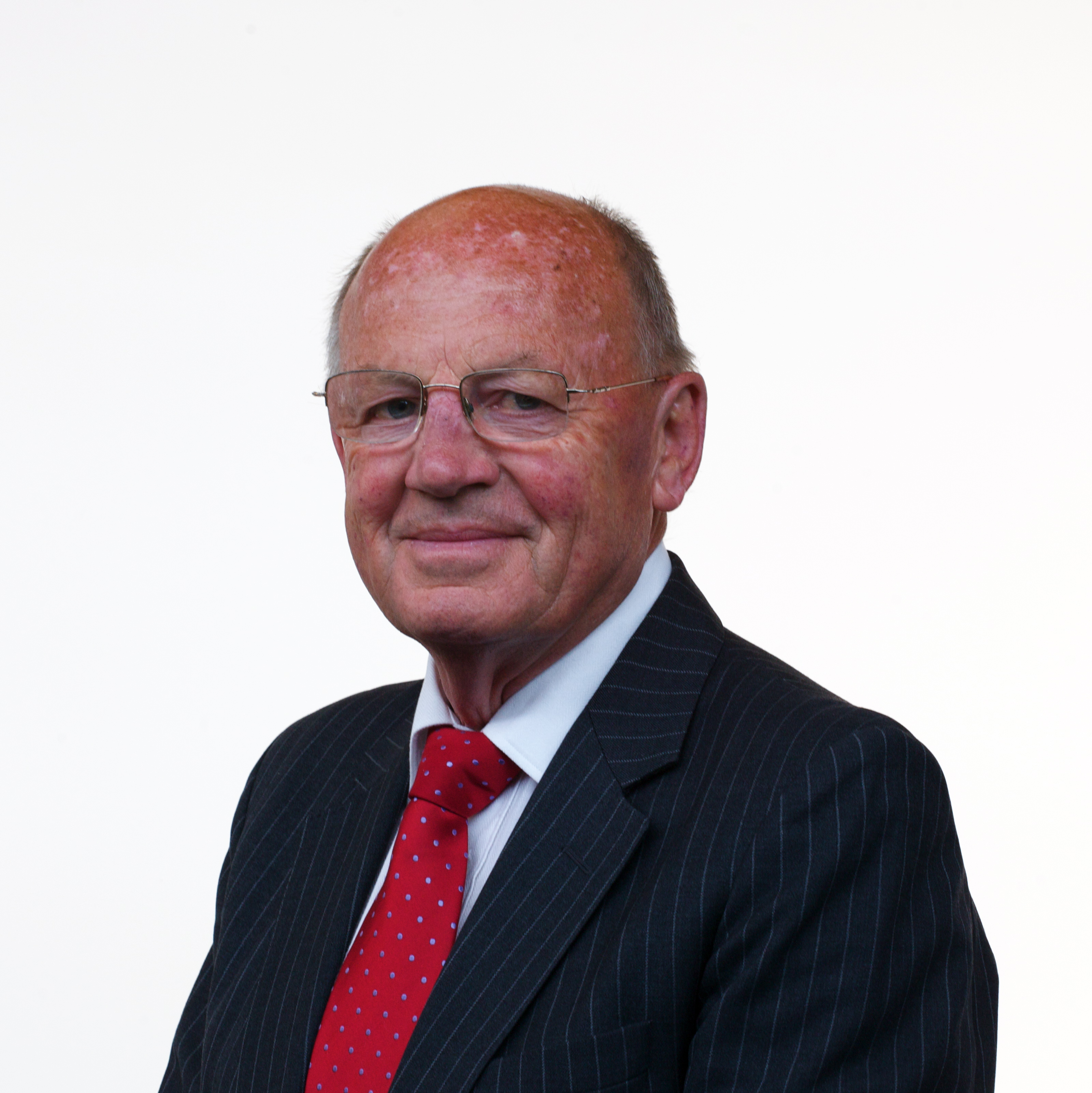

Member of the National Assembly of Wales for Llanelli
- In office 5 May 2011 – 5 May 2016
- Preceded by: Helen Mary Jones
- Succeeded by: Lee Waters

Personal details
- Born: 1940 or 1941 (age 84–85) Gwaun-Cae-Gurwen, Wales
- Party: Welsh Labour

Keith Prince-Davies (born 1940 or 1941) is a British educator and politician who served in the Senedd for the Llanelli constituency from 2011 to 2016. Prior to his tenure in the Senedd he was a member of the Carmarthenshire County Council. He is a member of Welsh Labour and the Co-operative Party.

== Early life ==
Keith Prince-Davies was born in Gwaun-Cae-Gurwen. He was educated at the Ystalyfera Grammar School and Swansea University. He married Heddyr, who worked for Tinopolis, and had two children with her. He can speak the Welsh language.

Davies worked as a teacher before becoming a school inspector and director of education. In 2000, he lost his job as director education when it was replaced by the position of education and community services director. He applied for the new position, but was not selected. He filed a lawsuit and was awarded £50,000 by a tribunal in April 2001.

== Career ==
Davies is a member of Welsh Labour and the Co-operative Party. From 2004 to 2008, Davies was a member of the Carmarthenshire County Council representing Hengoed Ward.

In the 2011 election Davies was elected to the Senedd in the Llanelli constituency after defeating four candidates, including Plaid Cymru nominee Helen Mary Jones by 80 votes. He declined to run for reelection in 2016.

In April 2012, Davies and a woman yelled and threatened staff at the St. David's Hotel in Cardiff. Davies stated that he was drunk during the incident. He was censured by a unanimous vote of Senedd members and he apologised for her behaviour on 16 May 2012.

On 26 September 2012, Davies was admitted to the University Hospital of Wales after suffering a blood clot on the brain. It was treated without surgery and was discharged from the hospital on 23 October.

== Works cited ==
=== News ===
- "Colleagues' concerns for 'seriously ill' AM Keith Davies". ITV. 29 September 2012. Archived from the original on 18 June 2025.
- "Ex-schools chief takes on leader". BBC. 6 February 2004. Archived from the original on 18 June 2025.
- "Hotel row AM Keith Davies 'brought assembly into disrepute'". BBC. 9 May 2012. Archived from the original on 18 June 2025.
- "Hotel row Llanelli AM Keith Davies censured by assembly". BBC. 16 May 2012. Archived from the original on 18 June 2025.
- "Llanelli AM Keith Davies leaves hospital after blood clot". BBC. 23 October 2012. Archived from the original on 18 June 2025.
- "Llanelli AM Keith Davies to stand down in 2016". BBC. 19 June 2015. Archived from the original on 18 June 2025.
- "Voters in West Wales could hold key to Assembly majority". Wales Online. 4 May 2011. Archived from the original on 18 June 2025.

=== Web ===
- "Election results for Llanelli". Senedd. Archived from the original on 18 June 2025.
- "Keith Davies". Senedd. Archived from the original on 18 June 2025.

Senedd
| Preceded by Helen Mary Jones | Assembly Member for Llanelli; 2011 – 2016 | Succeeded by Lee Waters |
