= Llanelli (Senedd constituency) =

Senedd constituency (1999–2026)

Coordinates: 51°43′14″N 4°13′33″W

- Former Senedd county constituency for the Senedd

- Llanelli shown within the Mid and West Wales electoral region and the region shown within Wales

Former Senedd county constituency
- Created: 1999
- Abolished: 2026
- Party: Welsh Labour and Co-operative
- Member of the Senedd: Lee Waters
- Preserved county: Dyfed

Llanelli was a constituency of the Senedd. It elected one Member of the Senedd by the first past the post method of election. Also, however, it was one of eight constituencies in the Mid and West Wales electoral region, which elected four additional members, in addition to eight constituency members, to produce a degree of proportional representation for the region as a whole.

== Boundaries ==
Map of 2007–2026 boundaries

=== 1999 to 2007 ===
The constituency was created for the first election to the Assembly, in 1999, with the name and boundaries of the Llanelli Westminster constituency. It was a Dyfed constituency, one of five constituencies covering, and entirely within, the preserved county of Dyfed.

The other four Dyfed constituencies were Carmarthen East and Dinefwr, Carmarthen West and South Pembrokeshire, Ceredigion and Preseli Pembrokeshire. They were all within the Mid and West Wales electoral region.

The region consisted of the eight constituencies of Brecon and Radnorshire, Carmarthen East and Dinefwr, Carmarthen West and South Pembrokeshire, Ceredigion, Llanelli, Meirionnydd Nant Conwy, Montgomeryshire and Preseli Pembrokeshire.

=== From 2007 ===
The constituency includes the whole of 9 Carmarthenshire communities (Kidwelly; Llanedi; Llanelli; Llanelli Rural; Llangennech; Llannon; Pembrey and Burry Port Town; Pontyberem; and Trimsaran).

Boundaries changed for the 2007 Assembly election. Llanelli remained one of five Dyfed constituencies and one of eight constituencies in the Mid and West Wales region. However, boundaries within Dyfed changed, to realign them with local government ward boundaries and to reduce disparities in the sizes of constituency electorates, and the boundaries of the region changed, to align them with the boundaries of preserved counties.

The other four Dyfed constituencies were, again, Carmarthen East and Dinefwr, Carmarthen West and South Pembrokeshire, Ceredigion and Preseli Pembrokeshire, all within the Mid and West Wales electoral region.

The region consisted of the constituencies of Brecon and Radnorshire, Carmarthen East and Dinefwr, Carmarthen West and South Pembrokeshire, Ceredigion, Dwyfor Meirionnydd, Llanelli, Montgomeryshire and Preseli Pembrokeshire.

For Westminster purposes, the same new constituency boundaries became effective for the 2010 United Kingdom general election.

== Voting ==
In general elections for the Senedd, each voter had two votes. The first vote was used to vote for a candidate to become the Member of the Senedd for the voter's constituency, elected by the first past the post system. The second vote was used to vote for a regional closed party list of candidates. Additional member seats were allocated from the lists by the d'Hondt method, with constituency results being taken into account in the allocation.

It was a marginal seat between Plaid and the Labour Party, and until the 2016 Assembly election, had never been held by the same party for more than one consecutive term.

== Members of the Senedd ==
Election	Member	Portrait	Party
1999	Helen Mary Jones		Plaid Cymru
2003	Catherine Thomas		Welsh Labour
2007	Helen Mary Jones		Plaid Cymru
2011	Keith Davies		Welsh Labour
2016	Lee Waters		Welsh Labour and Co-operative

== Results ==
=== Elections in the 2020s ===
2021 Senedd election: Llanelli
Party	Candidate	Constituency			Regional		
Party	Candidate	Votes	%	±%	Votes	%	±%
Labour	Lee Waters (Note: Incumbent member for this constituency)	13,930	46.1	+9.6	12,387	41.4	+4.0
Plaid Cymru	Helen Mary Jones (Note: Incumbent member on the party list, or for another constituency)	8,255	27.3	-7.9	8,149	27.3	-3.5
Conservative	Stefan Ryszewski	4,947	16.4	+9.5	5,122	17.1	+9.1
UKIP	Howard Lillyman	722	2.4	-12.3	529	1.8	-12.4
Reform	Gareth Beer	672	2.2	New	398	1.3	New
Liberal Democrats	Jonathan Edward Burree	606	2.0	+0.7	624	2.1	+1.0
Gwlad	Siân Caiach	544	1.8	New	372	1.2	New
Independent	Shahana Najmi	542	1.8	New			
Green					901	3.0	+1.9
Abolish					855	2.9	+0.3
Christian					194	0.6	New
Freedom Alliance (UK)					160	0.5	New
Propel					90	0.3	New
Communist					64	0.2	0.0
TUSC					58	0.2	New
Majority		5,675	18.8	+17.5			
Turnout		30,218	48.14	+1.0			
Labour hold		Swing					

=== Elections in the 2010s ===
Welsh Assembly Election 2016: Llanelli
Party	Candidate	Constituency			Regional		
Party	Candidate	Votes	%	±%	Votes	%	±%
Labour	Lee Waters	10,267	36.5	-3.2	10,492	37.4	-1.4
Plaid Cymru	Helen Mary Jones	9,885	35.2	-4.2	8,648	30.8	-3.9
UKIP	Kenneth Rees	4,132	14.7	New	3,996	14.2	New
Conservative	Stefan Ryszewski	1,937	6.9	-4.1	2,257	8.0	-3.6
Putting Llanelli First	Siân Caiach	1,113	4.0	−3.7			
Green	Guy Smith	427	1.5	New	521	1.9	New
Liberal Democrats	Gemma Bowker	355	1.3	-0.8	297	1.1	-1.5
Abolish					716	2.6	New
People First (Wales)					710	2.5	New
Monster Raving Loony					138	0.5	New
Welsh Christian					169	0.6	-0.5
Association of Welsh Independents					74	0.3	New
Communist					56	0.2	-0.1
Majority		382	1.3	+1.0			
Turnout		28,116	47.1	+2.5			
Labour hold		Swing	+0.6				

Welsh Assembly Election 2011: Llanelli
Party	Candidate	Constituency			Regional		
Party	Candidate	Votes	%	±%	Votes	%	±%
Labour	Keith Davies	10,359	39.7	+3.6	10,119	38.8	+6.3
Plaid Cymru	Helen Mary Jones	10,279	39.4	-10.7	9,045	34.7	-5.8
Conservative	Andrew Morgan	2,880	11.0	+1.1	3,036	11.6	+1.5
Putting Llanelli First	Siân Caiach	2,004	7.7	New			
Liberal Democrats	Cheryl Philpott	548	2.1	-1.7	682	2.6	-0.9
UKIP					1,014	3.9	+1.1
Socialist Labour					727	2.8	+1.5
Green					599	2.3	-0.4
BNP					480	1.8	-2.4
Welsh Christian					284	1.1	+0.3
Communist					79	0.3	0.0
Majority		80	0.3	N/A			
Turnout		26,070	44.6	+3.0			
Labour gain from Plaid Cymru		Swing	+7.2				

Regional ballots rejected: 136

=== Elections in the 2000s ===
Welsh Assembly Election 2007: Llanelli
Party	Candidate	Constituency			Regional		
Party	Candidate	Votes	%	±%	Votes	%	±%
Plaid Cymru	Helen Mary Jones	13,839	50.1	+7.3	11,119	40.5	+5.5
Labour	Catherine Thomas	9,955	36.1	-6.7	8,913	32.5	-9.6
Conservative	Andrew D Morgan	2,757	10.0	+2.6	2,768	10.1	-2.2
Liberal Democrats	Jeremy N Townsend	1,051	3.8	-3.3	960	3.5	-3.6
BNP					1,166	4.2	New
UKIP					768	2.8	+1.1
Green					732	2.7	-0.1
Socialist Labour					349	1.3	New
Welsh Christian					213	0.8	New
Gwynoro Jones - Independent					186	0.7	New
Caroline Evans - Independent					100	0.4	New
Veritas					61	0.2	New
Communist					69	0.3	New
CPA					55	0.2	New
Majority		3,698	13.8	N/A			
Turnout		26,889	41.6	−6.2			
Plaid Cymru gain from Labour		Swing	-8.8				

Welsh Assembly Election 2003: Llanelli
Party	Candidate	Constituency			Regional		
Party	Candidate	Votes	%	±%	Votes	%	±%
Labour	Catherine Thomas	9,916	42.8	+3.1	9,761	42.1	+5.2
Plaid Cymru	Helen Mary Jones	9,895	42.8	-0.7	8,136	35.1	-9.0
Conservative	Gareth John Jones	1,712	7.4	+0.8	1,830	7.9	+1.3
Liberal Democrats	Kenneth Denver Rees	1,644	6.1	-3.2	1,648	7.1	-0.7
Green					659	2.8	Unknown
Mid and West Wales Pensioners					461	2.0	New
UKIP					396	1.7	New
Cymru Annibynnol					150	0.6	New
Vote 2 Stop the War					75	0.3	New
ProLife Alliance					60	0.3	New
Majority		21	0.0	N/A			
Turnout		23,167	40.3	−8.6			
Labour gain from Plaid Cymru		Swing	+1.3				

2003 Electorate: 33,742
Regional ballots rejected: 166

=== Elections in the 1990s ===
Welsh Assembly Election 1999: Llanelli
Party	Candidate	Constituency			Regional		
Party	Candidate	Votes	%	±%	Votes	%	±%
Plaid Cymru	Helen Mary Jones	11,973	42.1	N/A	12,540	44.1	N/A
Labour Co-op	Ann Garrard	11,285	39.7	N/A	10,485	36.9	N/A
Liberal Democrats	Tim R. Dumper	2,920	10.3	N/A	2,210	7.8	N/A
Conservative	Barrie Harding	1,864	6.6	N/A	1,870	6.6	N/A
Independent	Anthony G. Popham	345	1.3	N/A			
Other list parties					1,317	4.6	N/A
Majority		688	2.4	N/A			
Turnout		28,387	48.9	N/A			
Plaid Cymru win (new seat)							
