= Gwyn R. Price =

Welsh politician

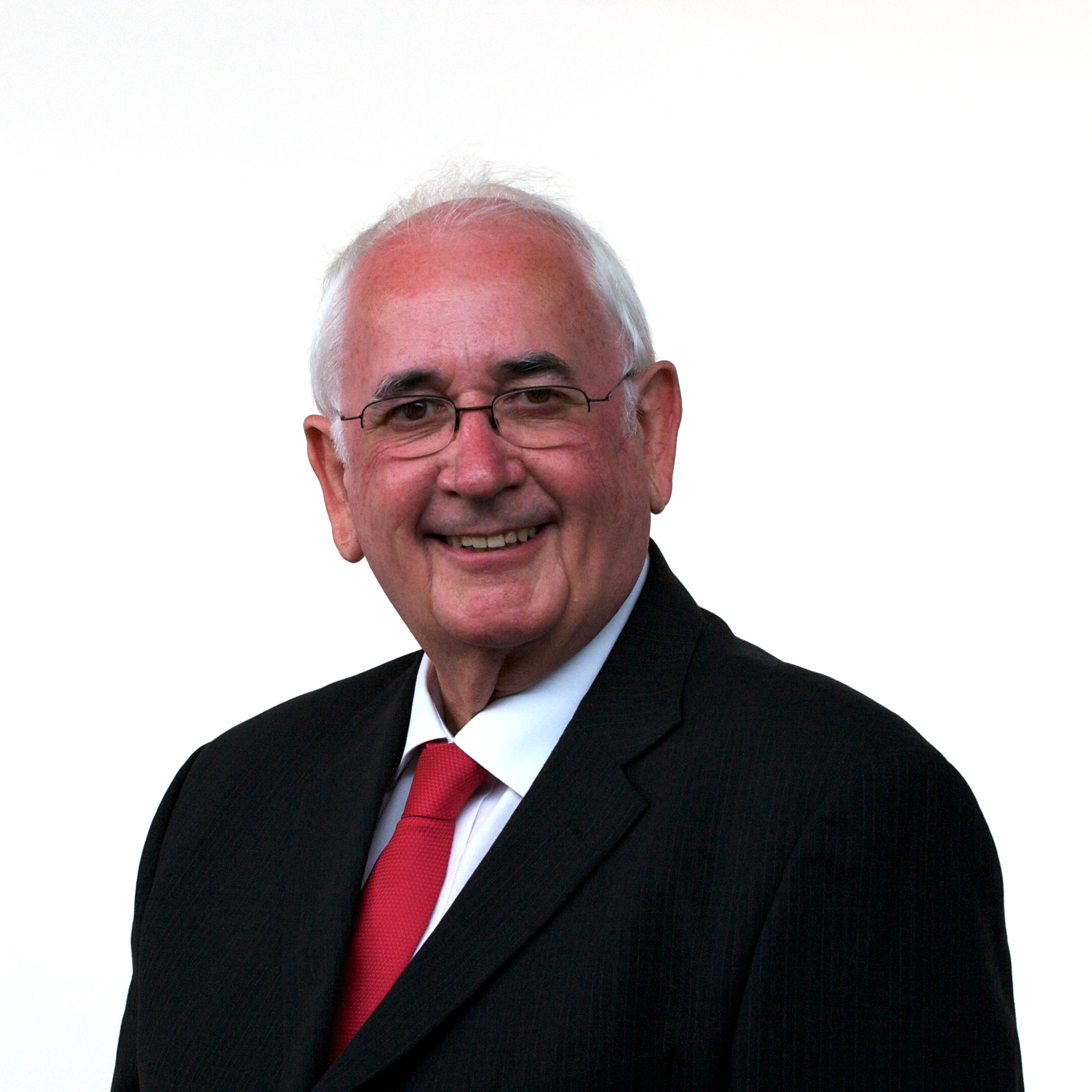

Member of the Welsh Assembly for Islwyn
- In office 5 May 2011 – 5 May 2016
- Preceded by: Irene James
- Succeeded by: Rhianon Passmore
- Majority: 7,589 (in 2011)

Personal details
- Born: 1948 (age 77–78)
- Party: Welsh Labour

Gwyn R. Price (born 1948) is a former Welsh Labour politician who served as the Member of the Welsh Assembly (AM) for Islwyn from 2011 to 2016.

== Political career ==
Price was first elected to the Welsh Assembly at the 2011 election, representing Islwyn.

On 18 February 2014, Price announced his intention to stand down at the elections in 2016. He subsequently faced widespread criticism on social media over his perceived lack of engagement in the Assembly.

Senedd
Preceded by Irene James	Assembly Member for Islwyn; 2011 – 2016	Succeeded by Rhianon Passmore
