= Killing of Ruth Williams =

2020 killing of a 67-year-old woman in Wales

- Cwmbran (Torfaen) Cwmbran (the United Kingdom)
- Location: Cwmbran, Wales
- Date: 28 March 2020 c. 6:00 a.m. (BST)
- Attack type: Domestic homicide, strangulation
- Victim: Ruth Williams
- Perpetrator: Anthony Williams
- Inquiry: Domestic homicide review by Torfaen County Borough Council
- Charges: Murder (initially), Manslaughter (reduced)
- Convictions: Manslaughter
- Litigation: Court of Appeal (sentence review)
- Judge: Lord Justice Bean (Court of Appeal)

On 28 March 2020, 67-year-old Ruth Williams was strangled to death by her 69-year-old husband Anthony Williams in Cwmbran, Wales. In February 2021, he pleaded guilty to manslaughter on the ground of diminished responsibility, and was acquitted of murder. His defence argued that he acted due to his mental state, which had been worsened due to the COVID-19 pandemic. The lesser charge, and the sentence of five years' imprisonment, was criticised by politicians and anti-domestic abuse activists. The killing is considered the first act of fatal violence related to the COVID-19 lockdown in the United Kingdom.

== Background ==
The Williams couple had been married since 1976 and lived in the Brynglas area of Cwmbran since 2000. According to testimony by the Williams' daughter, the couple had no history of violence or argument. She said that her father became obsessed with reducing his energy bills in January 2020, even though he was financially secure. He then became obsessed with news about COVID-19, and when a lockdown was imposed, he feared that he would not leave the house again.

== Killing ==
On the morning of 28 March 2020, the couple had been arguing while lying in bed at home. According to Anthony Williams' police interviews, his wife told him to "just get over it" and in his own words he "snapped" and started strangling her. She broke free from his grip and fled downstairs to retrieve the house keys, where he caught up and killed his wife on the porch. A few minutes later at 6:50, he alerted his neighbours, who then called the police. Ruth Williams was brought to Royal Gwent Hospital in Newport, where she was pronounced dead. The strangulation had fractured three of her neck vertebrae.

== Trial ==
While Anthony Williams pleaded guilty to manslaughter on the grounds of diminished responsibility, he was tried for murder at Swansea Crown Court. One psychologist, Dr Alison Witts, argued that his faculties were impaired due to depression, sleep deprivation, and anxiety, that was worsened by the pandemic and lockdown. Dr Damian Gamble, another psychologist, said that the defendant had no history of mental illness.

Anthony Williams was found not guilty of murder in a unanimous verdict. The starting point for a manslaughter sentence is between one and seven years, rising to life imprisonment at maximum. Due to the sustained nature of the attack, he would have faced seven-and-a-half years, but this was reduced to five due to his guilty plea. At sentencing, he was told he would likely serve half of this sentence in prison.

== Reaction ==
=== Referral to Court of Appeal ===
The Domestic Abuse Commissioner Nicole Jacobs and Victims' Commissioner Dame Vera Baird wrote a joint letter to Home Secretary Priti Patel, Lord Chancellor Robert Buckland and Attorney General Michael Ellis. They proposed a review of sentencing for domestic homicides, contrasting Anthony Williams' sentence with that of a woman who received a life sentence for murder of her abusive husband, later reduced to 14 years for manslaughter. They argued that women are more likely to use weapons to kill abusive partners as they are often physically weaker than men, and therefore receive aggravated sentences for using weapons.

Labour Members of Parliament Harriet Harman, Jess Phillips and Alex Davies-Jones wrote letters to the Attorney General, asking for the case to be reviewed in the High Court of Appeals. According to Harman, a former Solicitor General, Anthony Williams would have been convicted of murder had he killed a neighbour outside his house.

In March 2021, Ellis referred the sentence to the Court of Appeals as unduly lenient. The following month, the court refused to increase the sentence; Lord Justice Bean ruled that it was correct for the trial judge not to consider sentencing guidelines for domestic abuse, as "There was no history of controlling behaviour or coercive behaviour or any previous incidents of violence or abuse… Quite the contrary". Commenting on the court's decision, Labour MP Harriet Harman said, "Saying [Anthony] Williams’ actions are wholly explained by his illness shows the courts are simply still too ready to accept excuses.... To say it’s not domestic abuse, when a man kills his wife, is fatuous. This is the ultimate, most extreme form of domestic abuse."

=== Other reactions ===
Patel ordered for Torfaen County Borough Council to carry out a domestic homicide review, which had previously been refused on the basis that Ruth Williams was not known to social services.

The Observer named Williams as an example in their campaign to highlight abuse and violence towards elderly women.

While the trial was ongoing, a Welsh anti-domestic violence activist wrote a tweet in which she speculated that Anthony Williams had a history of abuse, something denied in his daughter's testimony. The activist, and Senedd Cymru – Welsh Parliament member Helen Mary Jones who shared the tweet, were reprimanded by the judge for "a clear contempt of court", though no formal action was taken.
