= Irene James =

Welsh politician

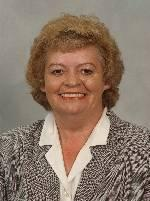

Member of the Welsh Assembly for Islwyn
- In office 1 May 2003 – 6 May 2011
- Preceded by: Brian Hancock
- Succeeded by: Gwyn Price

Personal details
- Born: 1952 (age 73–74)
- Party: Your Party (from 2026)
- Other political affiliations: Labour (1970s to 2026)

Irene James (born 1952) is a Welsh Labour politician who represented the constituency of Islwyn in the National Assembly for Wales from 2003 to 2011.

== Personal life ==
James was educated Newbridge Grammar School and the Cardiff College of Music & Drama. She completed her teacher training at Borough Road College, London, after which she became a teacher for children with learning disabilities at Risca Primary School. Her main interests are jobs, education and health.

== Political career ==
James was first elected as AM for the Islwyn constituency at the 2003 Welsh Assembly Elections, with a majority of 7320. She regained the traditionally labour constituency from Brian Hancock of Plaid Cymru, who had won the seat in a shock result at the first National Assembly elections. She was reelected in 2007, with a significantly reduced majority of 2218. James announced, in July 2009, that she would be standing down from the National Assembly for Wales in the 2011 election.

James was agent to Don Touhig MP at the 2005 general election.

In 2026, James described the Labour Party and Keir Starmer as out of touch with the working class and confirmed she had joined Your Party

== Offices held ==
Senedd
Preceded by Brian Hancock	Assembly Member for Islwyn; 2003 – 2011	Succeeded by Gwyn Price
