= Rhianon Passmore =

Welsh politician

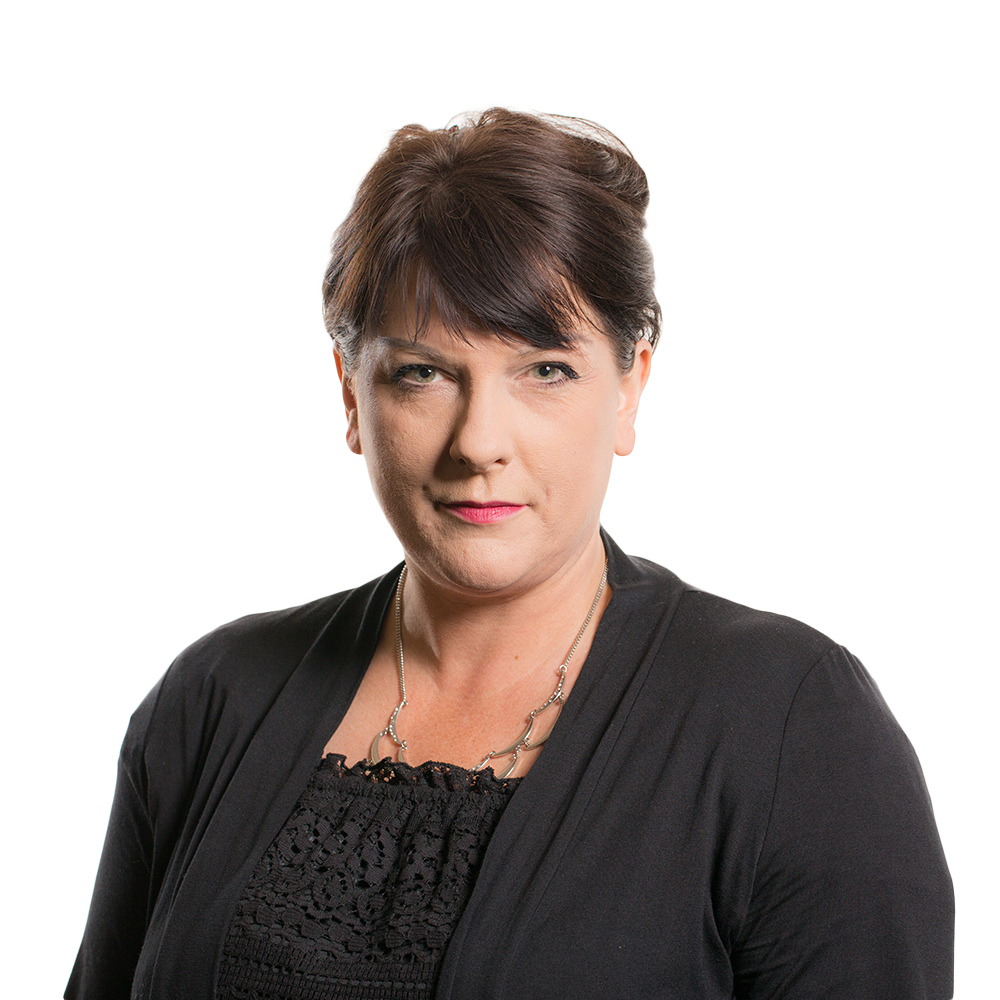
- Passmore in 2016

Member of the Senedd for Islwyn
- In office 6 May 2016 – 7 April 2026
- Preceded by: Gwyn R Price
- Succeeded by: Constituency abolished

Caerphilly County Borough Councillor for Risca East
- In office 10 June 2004 – 16 October 2016
- Preceded by: Harry Styles
- Succeeded by: Arianna Passmore

Personal details
- Party: Labour Co-operative

Rhianon Passmore is a Welsh Labour and Co-operative politician. She was the Member of the Senedd for Islwyn from 2016 to 2026.

== Political career ==
Passmore was elected to represent Risca east on Caerphilly County Borough Council in 2004, defeating incumbent Plaid Cymru councillor Harry Styles. She was re-elected at elections in 2008 and 2012, before standing down in 2016 after her election to the Senedd. Her daughter, Arianna Passmore, successfully contested the by-election on her resignation.

Passmore stood unsuccessfully on Labour party lists for Mid and West Wales at the 2003 Welsh Assembly elections and for South Wales East in the 2007 elections. In July 2015, Passmore was selected as the Welsh Labour and Co-operative Party candidate for the Islwyn constituency of the Senedd. On 5 May 2016, she was elected with 10,050 votes (45.0% of votes cast). She was re-elected in 2021 with a majority of 5,239 votes.

Passmore was a member of the Finance Committee, Petitions Committee and Public Accounts and Public Administration Committee. She chaired the cross-party group on Music, and a member of groups on Armed Forces and Cadets and Lung Health.

Passmore stood in Casnewydd Islwyn at the 2026 Senedd election but failed to win a seat.

== Controversies ==
In October 2017 she was arrested by South Wales Police after failing to provide a breath test; as a result she was banned from driving for 20 months, fined £1,000, £100 victim surcharge and £620 in costs. Passmore alleged she was not unwilling to provide a sample, but physically unable due to her asthma, and a lack of access to her asthma medication. She was also suspended from the National Assembly for a fortnight and was suspended by the Labour Group from 10 July 2018 until 1 October 2018.

In early 2021, Passmore faced criticism after it was revealed she had participated in Senedd meetings remotely from a property in Hannington, Wiltshire, over 80 miles from her constituency in South Wales, during the height of the COVID-19 lockdown. The property belonged to her partner, and the pair were reported to be in a support bubble at the time. Critics argued that the travel appeared to breach the spirit, if not the letter, of Welsh lockdown guidance, which advised support bubbles to be formed locally where possible. Passmore had also shared public messaging urging others to "stay at home," leading to accusations of hypocrisy. Welsh Labour defended her actions, stating that she remained within the rules due to the support bubble arrangement.

Passmore was briefly suspended from the Labour group in the Senedd on 26 June 2024 after she was alleged to have used several number plates on her car, which is a criminal offence. The suspension was lifted in under 24 hours after a police investigation ruled that there was no evidence for this claim and that no offence had been committed.

In May 2025, WalesOnline reported that Rhianon Passmore continued to employ Cardiff councillor Keith Jones in her Senedd office, despite his expulsion from the Labour Party following a three-year investigation into a complaint described as involving physical misconduct of a sexual nature toward a girl under the age of 18 at a Labour Party event. Although his Labour membership had been administratively suspended since 2022, his continued employment raised questions among party members, as Jones remained on Cardiff Council as an independent. Jones had previously faced disciplinary action in 2015 for sending inappropriate messages to female party members and was found guilty of professional misconduct in 2010 while working as a teacher and struck off as a teacher following his guilty verdict. He continues to work for Passmore on the highest salary band available to Senedd parliamentary staff.

Senedd
Preceded by Gwyn R Price	Member of the Senedd for Islwyn; 2016 – 2026	Succeeded by seat abolished
