= Brian Hancock =

British politician (born 1950)

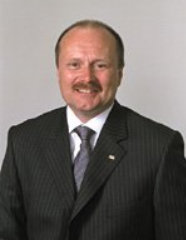
- Hancock in 1999

Member of the Welsh Assembly for Islwyn
- In office 6 May 1999 – 1 May 2003
- Preceded by: New Assembly
- Succeeded by: Irene James

Personal details
- Born: 8 August 1950 (age 76) Cardiff
- Party: Plaid Cymru
- Education: Loughborough University

Brian Hancock (born 8 August 1950 in Cardiff) is a Welsh politician and member of Plaid Cymru. He was the Welsh Assembly Member for Islwyn for the Assembly's first term (1999–2003).

== Background ==
Born in Cardiff in 1950, Hancock was educated at Lady Mary High School, Cardiff and Llandaff Technical College, also in Cardiff. He went on to earn a BSc in Chemical Engineering at the Polytechnic of Wales in Pontypridd.

He rose through the ranks in the world of chemical engineering, starting out at Monsanto Ltd as an engineer in 1974, eventually becoming Health, Safety and Environment Superintendent for BP Chemicals in 1988. He became a self-employed Health, Safety and Environment Consultant in 1992. He later worked part-time as a Business Development Adviser.

Among his interests are rugby and athletics, he has been the chair of Newport Harriers Athletic Club for nearly 20 years.

== Political career ==
Hancock was elected Plaid AM for Islwyn in the First Welsh Assembly Elections in 1999 with a majority of 604 votes from the Labour Party. Islwyn was one of the several Labour strongholds in the South Wales Valleys which unpredictably fell to Plaid. Hancock served as Plaid's Deputy Whip and as Spokesman for Small Businesses. Irene James regained the seat for Labour in the 2003 Elections.

More recently, Hancock stood as Plaid's candidate for the Newport West constituency in the 2007 National Assembly Elections, coming fourth with 10.4% of the vote.

Senedd
Preceded by (new post)	Assembly Member for Islwyn; 1999 – 2003	Succeeded by Irene James
