= 2016 National Assembly for Wales election =

- 5 May 2016

All 60 seats to the National Assembly for Wales 31 seats needed for a majority
- Opinion polls
- Turnout: 45.3% ▲3.1%
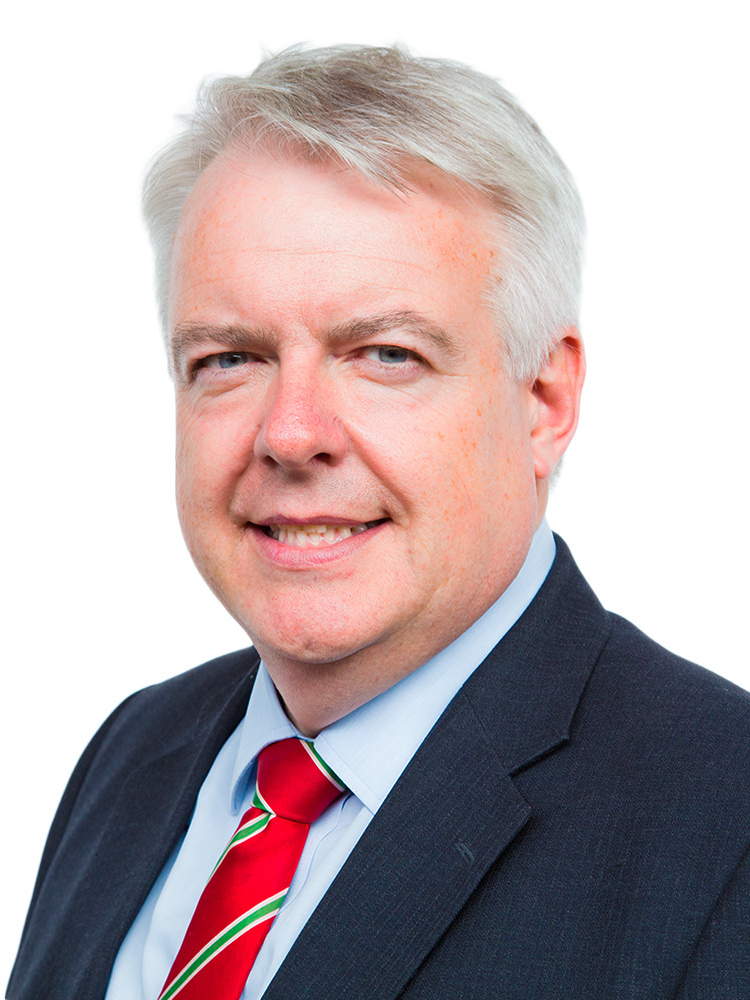

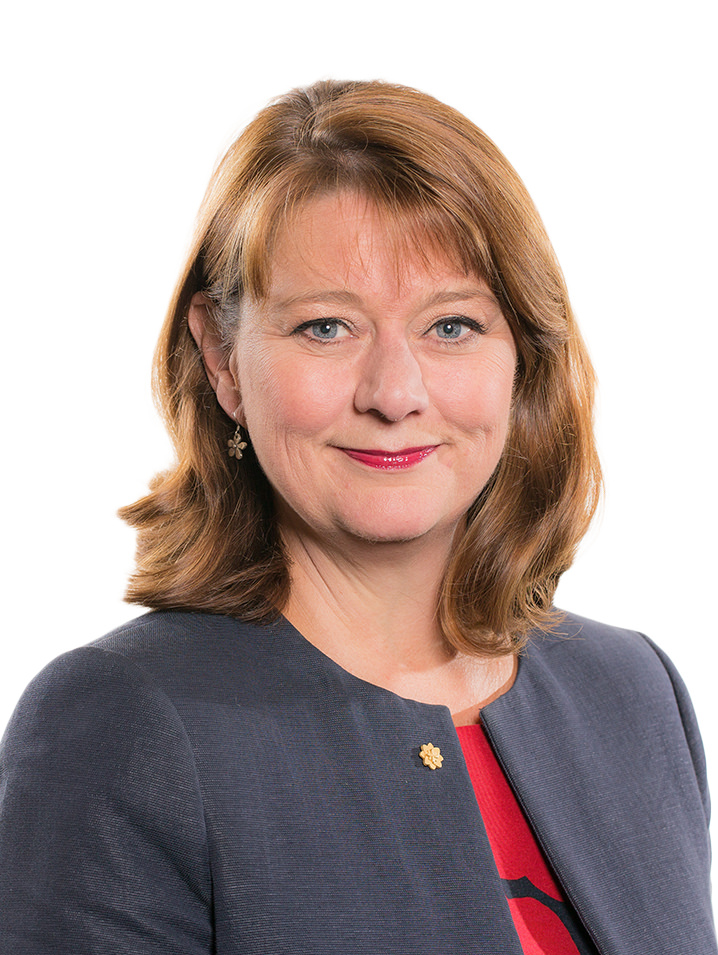

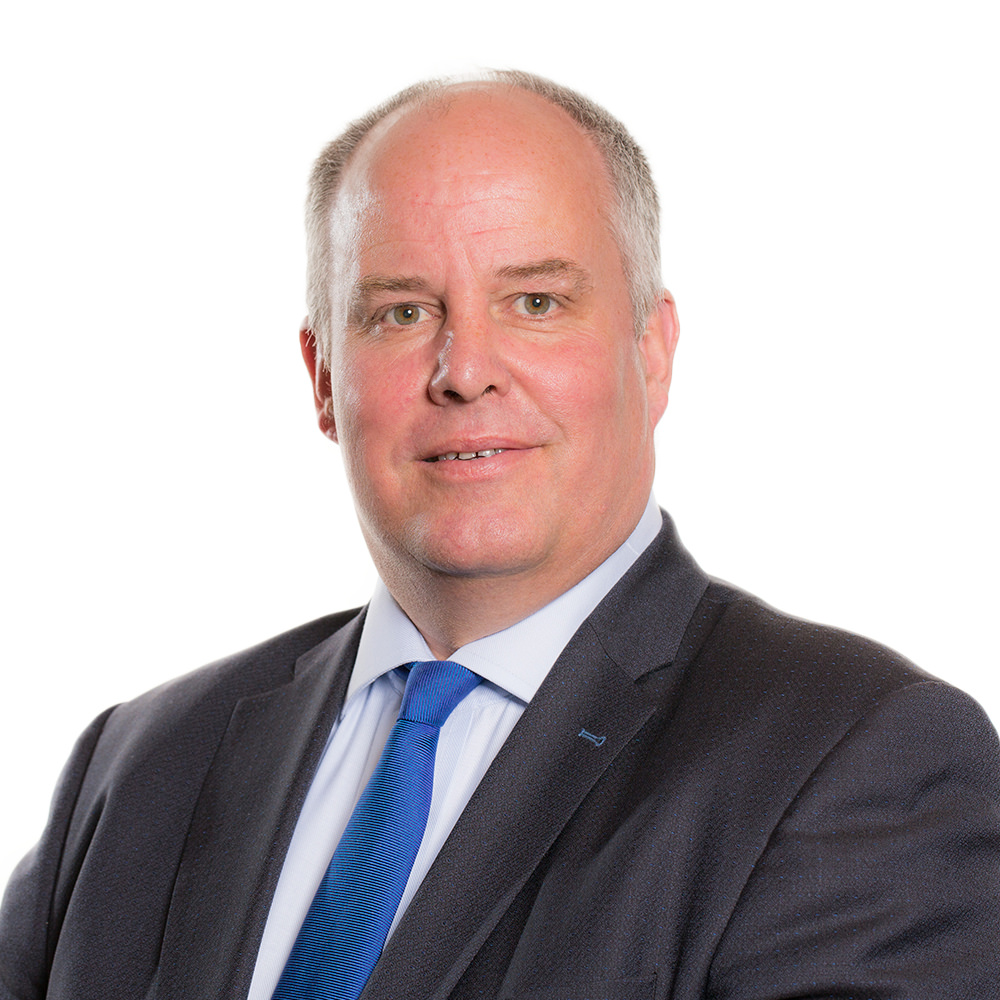

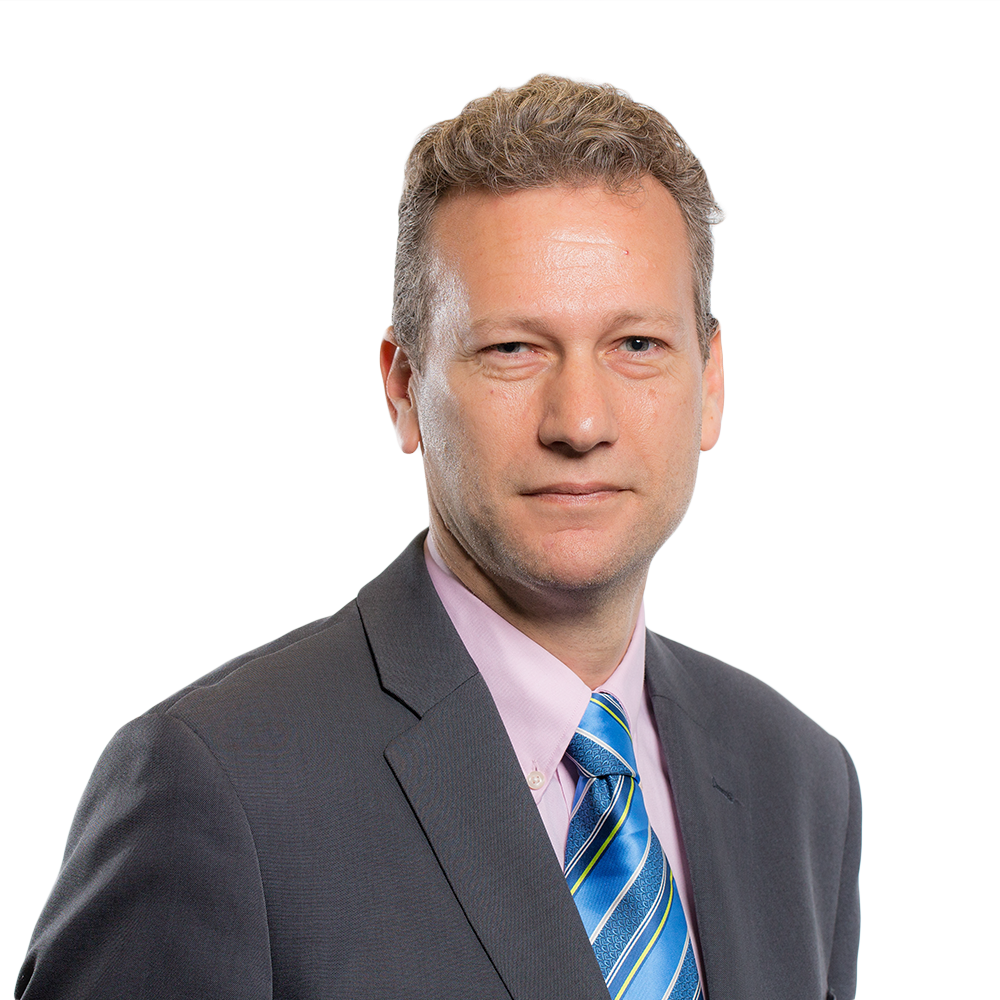

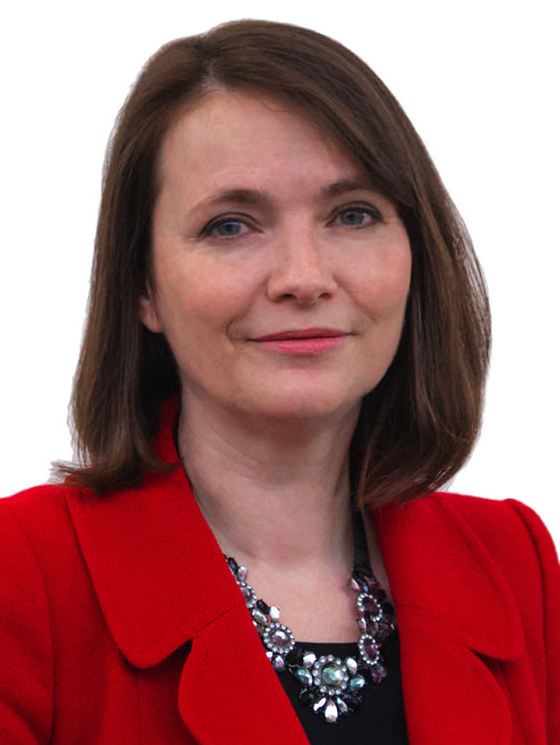
	First party	Second party	Third party
Leader	Carwyn Jones	Leanne Wood	Andrew RT Davies
Party	Labour	Plaid Cymru	Conservative
Leader since	1 December 2009	16 March 2012	14 July 2011
Leader's seat	Bridgend	Rhondda (Note: Previously AM for South Wales Central region from 2003-2016, before being elected to Rhondda at this election.)	South Wales Central
Last election	30 (Note: Includes 10 AMs sponsored by the Co-operative Party, who are designated Labour and Co-operative.) seats	11 seats	14 seats
Seats before	30	11	14
Seats won	29 (Note: Includes 13 AMs sponsored by the Co-operative Party, who are designated Labour and Co-operative.)	12	11
Seat change	▼1	▲1	▼3
Constituency Vote	353,866	209,376	215,597
% and change	34.7% ▼7.6%	20.5% ▲1.2%	21.1% ▼3.9%
Regional Vote	319,196	211,548	190,846
% and change	31.5% ▼5.4%	20.8% ▲2.9%	18.8% ▼3.7%
	Fourth party	Fifth party
Leader	Nathan Gill	Kirsty Williams
Party	UKIP	Liberal Democrats
Leader since	6 December 2014	8 December 2008
Leader's seat	North Wales (Note: Not an incumbent but stood for this region and won)	Brecon and Radnorshire
Last election	0 seats	5 seats
Seats before	0	5
Seats won	7	1
Seat change	▲7	▼4
Constituency Vote	127,038	78,165
% and change	12.5% (New)	7.7% ▼2.9%
Regional Vote	132,138	65,504
% and change	13.0% ▲8.4%	6.5% ▼1.5%
First Minister before election
Carwyn Jones
Labour
First Minister after election
Carwyn Jones
Labour

An election for the National Assembly for Wales was held on Thursday 5 May 2016, to elect members (AMs) of the National Assembly for Wales, later known as the Senedd (Welsh Parliament; Welsh: Senedd Cymru). It was the fifth election for the assembly, the third election taken under the rules of the Government of Wales Act 2006 and the first since the Wales Act 2014.

The governing Labour Party's share of the vote fell by over 7% and 29 Labour AMs were elected, one fewer than in 2011 and two short of an overall majority. Plaid Cymru became the Assembly's second largest party and the official opposition to the Welsh Government with 12 seats, one more than before. 11 Conservative AMs were elected, three fewer than in 2011. Although they did not win a single constituency, the UK Independence Party (UKIP) had seven members elected through the regional lists vote. The Liberal Democrats had only one AM returned, down from five.

The election was held on the same day as elections for the Scottish Parliament, the Northern Ireland Assembly, the Mayor and Assembly of London and in numerous local authorities in England. The by-election for the Westminster seat of Ogmore was also held on the same day. This election and elections to the other devolved chambers were delayed by a year from 2015 to 2016 as a result of the Fixed-term Parliaments Act 2011.

== Electoral method ==
In general elections for the National Assembly for Wales, each voter has two votes in a mixed member system. The first vote is for a candidate to become the Assembly Member for the voter's constituency, elected by the first past the post system. The second vote is for a regional closed party list of candidates. Additional member seats are allocated from the lists by the d'Hondt method, with constituency results being taken into account in the allocation. The overall result is approximately proportional.

Previously it was not allowed to stand in both a constituency and a regional list, but this rule was abolished by the Wales Act 2014. The Act also introduced a ban on dual mandates with the House of Commons: an Assembly Member is no longer allowed also to be an MP.

British, Irish, Commonwealth and European Union citizens living in Wales aged 18 or over on election day were entitled to vote.

== Retiring AMs ==
The following, previously incumbent AMs, did not run for re-election:

Constituency/region	Departing AM	Party
South Wales East region	Jocelyn Davies	Plaid Cymru
Arfon	Alun Ffred Jones	Plaid Cymru
Carmarthen East and Dinefwr	Rhodri Glyn Thomas	Plaid Cymru
Cynon Valley	Christine Chapman	Labour Co-op
Llanelli	Keith Davies	Labour Co-op
Ogmore	Janice Gregory	Labour
Gower	Edwina Hart	Labour
Merthyr Tydfil and Rhymney	Huw Lewis	Labour Co-op
Delyn	Sandy Mewies	Labour
Islwyn	Gwyn R Price	Labour
Neath	Gwenda Thomas	Labour
Caerphilly	Jeffrey Cuthbert	Labour
Newport West	Dame Rosemary Butler	Labour

== Constituency nominations ==
NB: AMs in office (i.e. incumbents) before the election are bolded. Winners are highlighted with party colours.

Constituency	Conservative	Labour	Lib Dem	Plaid Cymru	Green	UKIP	Others
Aberavon	David Jenkins	**David Rees**	Helen Ceri Clarke	Bethan Jenkins	Jonathan Tier	Glenda Davies	
Aberconwy	**Janet Finch-Saunders**	Mike Priestley	Sarah Lesiter-Burgess	Trystan Lewis	Petra Haig		
Alyn and Deeside	Mike Gibbs	**Carl Sargeant**	Pete Williams	Jacqueline Hurst	Martin Bennewith	Michelle Brown	
Arfon	Martin Peet	Sion Jones	Sarah Lloyd Williams	Siân Gwenllian			
Blaenau Gwent	Tracey West	**Alun Davies**	Brendan D'Cruz	Nigel Copner		Kevin Boucher	
Brecon and Radnorshire	Gary Price	Alex Thomas	**Kirsty Williams**	Freddy Greaves	Grenville Ham	Thomas Turton	
Bridgend	George Jabbour	**Carwyn Jones**	Jonathan Pratt	James Radcliffe	Charlotte Barlow	Caroline Jones	
Caerphilly	Jane Pratt	Hefin David	Aladdin Ayesh	Lindsay Whittle	Andrew Creak	Sam Gould	
Cardiff Central	Joel Williams	**Jenny Rathbone**	Eluned Parrott	Glyn Wise	Amelia Womack	Mohammed-Sarul Islam	Jane Croad (Independent)
Cardiff North	Jayne Cowan	**Julie Morgan**	John Dixon	Elin Walker Jones	Chris von Ruhland	Haydn Rushworth	Fiona Burt (Independent)
Cardiff South and Penarth	Ben Grey	**Vaughan Gething**	Nigel Howells	Dr Dafydd Trystan Davies	Anthony Slaughter	Hugh Moelwyn-Hughes	
Cardiff West	Sean Driscoll	**Mark Drakeford**	Cadan ap Tomos	Neil McEvoy	Hannah Pudner	Gareth Bennett	Elliot Freedman (Independent) Lee Woolls (Vapers in Power)
Carmarthen East and Dinefwr	Matthew Paul	Steve Jeacock	William Powell	Adam Price	Freya Amsbury	Neil Hamilton	
Carmarthen West and South Pembrokeshire	**Angela Burns**	Marc Tierney	Alistair Cameron	Simon Thomas	Val Bradley	Allan Brookes	Chris Overton (independent)
Ceredigion	Dr Felix Aubel	Iwan Wyn Jones	Elizabeth Evans	**Elin Jones**	Brian Williams	Gethin James	
Clwyd South	Simon Baynes	**Ken Skates**	Aled Roberts	Mabon ap Gwynfor	Duncan Rees	Mandy Jones	
Clwyd West	**Darren Millar**	Jo Thomas	Victor Babu	Llyr Huws Gruffydd	Julian Mahy	David Edwards	
Cynon Valley	Lyn Hudson	Vikki Howells	Michael Wallace	Cerith Griffiths	John Matthews	Liz Wilks	
Delyn	Huw Williams	Hannah Blythyn	Tom Rippeth	Paul Rowlinson		Nigel Williams	
Dwyfor Meirionnydd	Neil Fairlamb	Ian MacIntyre	Stephen Churchman	**Lord Elis-Thomas**	Alice Hooker-Stroud	Frank Wykes	Louise Hughes (Independent)
Gower	Lyndon Jones	Rebecca Evans	Sheila Kingston-Jones	Harri Roberts	Abi Cherry-Hamer	Colin Beckett	
Islwyn	Paul Williams	Rhianon Passmore	Matthew Kidner	Lyn Ackerman	Katy Beddoe	Joe Smyth	
Llanelli	Stefan Ryszewski	Lee Waters	Gemma-Jane Bowker	Helen Mary Jones	Guy Martin Smith	Kenneth Denver-Rees (Ken Rees)	Siân Caiach (Putting Llanelli First)
Merthyr Tydfil and Rhymney	Elizabeth Simon	Dawn Bowden	Bob Griffin	Brian Thomas	Julie Colbran	David Rowlands	
Monmouth	**Nick Ramsay**	Catherine Fookes	Veronica German	Jonathan Clark	Chris Were	Tim Price	Debby Blakebrough (Independent), Stephen Morris (English Democrats)
Montgomeryshire	**Russell George**	Martyn Singleton	Jane Dodds	Aled Morgan Hughes	Richard Chaloner	Des Parkinson	
Neath	Peter Crocker-Jaques	Jeremy Miles	Frank Little	Alun Llewelyn	Lisa Rapado	Richard Pritchard	Stephen Hunt (Independent)
Newport East	Munawar Mughal	**John Griffiths**	Paul Halliday	Tony Salkeld	Peter Varley	James Peterson	
Newport West	Matthew Evans	Jayne Bryant	Liz Newton	Simon Coopey	Pippa Bartolotti	Michael Ford	Gruff Meredith (Cymru Sovereign); Bill Fearnley-Whittingstall (Independent)
Ogmore	Jamie Wallis	Huw Irranca-Davies	Anita Davies	Tim Thomas	Laurence Brophy	Hazel Kendall	
Pontypridd	Joel James	**Mick Antoniw**	Mike Powell	Chad Rickard	Ken Barker	Edwin Allen	
Preseli Pembrokeshire	**Paul Davies**	Dan Lodge	Bob Kilmister	John Osmond	Frances Bryant	Howard Lillyman	
Rhondda	Maria Hill	**Leighton Andrews**	Rhys Taylor	Leanne Wood	Pat Matthews	Stephen Clee	
Swansea East	Sadie Vidal	**Michael Hedges**	Charlene Webster	Dic Jones	Tony Young	Clifford Johnson	
Swansea West	Craig Lawton	**Julie James**	Chris Holley	David Lloyd	Gareth Tucker	Rosie Irwin	Brian Johnson (Socialist Party of Great Britain)
Torfaen	Cllr Graham Smith	**Lynne Neagle**	Alison Willott	Matthew Woolfall-Jones	Steven Jenkins	Susan Boucher	
Vale of Clwyd	Sam Rowlands	**Ann Jones**	Gwyn Williams	Mair Rowlands		Paul Davies-Cooke	
Vale of Glamorgan	Ross England	**Jane Hutt**	Denis Campbell	Ian Johnson	Alison Haden	Lawrence Andrews	
Wrexham	Andrew Atkinson	**Lesley Griffiths**	Beryl Blackmore	Carrie Harper	Alan Butterworth	Jeanette Bassford-Barton	
Ynys Môn	Clay Theakston	Julia Dobson	Mark Rosenthal	**Rhun ap Iorwerth**	Gerry Wolff	Simon Wall	Daniel Meredith Ap Eifion Jones (Independent)

== Regional lists ==
=== Mid and West Wales ===
	Abolish the Welsh Assembly Party	Communist Party of Britain	Welsh Conservative Party	Wales Green Party	Monster Raving Loony Party	Welsh Local Independents	Welsh Labour	Welsh Liberal Democrats	People First	Plaid Cymru	UK Independence Party	Welsh Christian Party
1.	Jeremy David Pugh	Catrin Ashton	Aled Wyn Davies	Alice Hooker-Stroud	Lady Lily the Pink	Huw Meredydd George	Elizabeth Joyce Watson	William Denston Powell	Siân Mair Caiach	Simon Thomas	Neil Hamilton	Jeffrey Green
2.	Philip Bridger	Rick Newnham	Ian Harrison	Grenville Morgan Ham	Tristian Shout	Darren James Mayor	Mair Eluned Morgan	Jane Dodds	Alford Clement Thomas	Helen Mary Jones	Gethin James	Susan Green
3.	Richard Davies	Clive Griffiths	Harry Legge-Bourke	Pippa Pemberton	Lord & Lady Dunquan		John Bayliss	Gemma-Jane Bowker	Marion Binney	Vicky Moller	Des Parkinson	Louise Wynne Jones
4.	Ben Edwards	David Llewelyn Brown	Denise Howard	Frances Bryant	Knigel Knapp		Tonia Antoniazzi	Robert Philip Kilminster	Stephen Royston Bowen	Freddy John Dylan Greaves	Howard Lillyman	Barbara Irene Hill
5.			Edward Rayner Peett	Brian Dafydd Williams	Helen Swindon			Alistair Ronald Cameron	David Wayne Erasmus	Mandy Williams-Davies		
6.			Stephen Davies		Lieutenant Jâger Schnitzel			Stephen William Churchman		Aled Morgan Hughes		
7.			Mary Davies		R U Seerius					Elin Tracey Jones		
8.										Steffan Huw Gwent		
9.										Elin Jones		
10.										John David Osmond		
11.										Adam Price		

=== North Wales ===
	Abolish the Welsh Assembly Party	Communist Party of Britain	Welsh Conservative Party	Wales Green Party	Monster Raving Loony Party	Welsh Local Independents	Welsh Labour	Welsh Liberal Democrats	Plaid Cymru	Independent	UK Independence Party
1.	Harry Harrington	Trevor Jones	Mark Isherwood	Duncan Rees	Nick the Flying Brick	Goronwy Edwards	Mary Wimbury	Aled Roberts	Llyr Huws Gruffydd	Mark Young	Nathan Gill
2.	Bryan Craven	Mandy Walsh	Janet Haworth	Martin Bennewith	Lord Cameron of Roundwood	Merfyn Parry	Jason McLellan	Victor Babu	Carrie Harper		Michelle Brown
3.	Philip Price	Glyn Davies	Barbara Hughes	Petra Haig	Johnny Disco	Nigel Smith	Bernadette Horton	Sarah Lesiter-Burgess	Paul Rowlinson		Mandy Jones
4.	Nicola Hodgson	Graham Morgan	Antony Bertola	Gerry Wolff	Sir Oink A-Lot	Barbara Smith	Carolyn Thomas	Rob Walsh	Eleanor Griffith		David Edwards
5.			Gary Burchett		Mr McFloatyhands			Bruce Roberts	Jacqui Hurst		
6.			Adam Kealey		Leon of Britain			Tom Rippeth	Abdul Khan		
7.									Trystan Lewis		
8.									Mair Rowlands		

=== South Wales Central ===
	Abolish the Welsh Assembly Party	Communist Party of Britain	Welsh Conservative Party	Wales Green Party	Monster Raving Loony Party	Welsh Labour Party	Welsh Liberal Democrats	Plaid Cymru	Welsh TUSC	UK Independence Party	Women's Equality Party
1.	David Bevan	Robert Griffiths	Andrew R.T. Davies	Amelia Womack	Mark Beech	Belinda Robertson	Eluned Parrott	Leanne Wood	Ross Saunders	Gareth Bennett	Sharon Lovell
2.	Ceri Renwick	Gwen Griffiths	David Melding	Anthony Slaughter	Howling Laud Hope	Brian Back	John Dixon	Neil McEvoy	Mia Hollsing	Mohammed Islam	Emma Rose
3.	Timothy Frederick	Ramon Corria	Richard John	Hannah Pudner	Tony Davies	Anna McMorrin	Karen Roberts	Dr Dafydd Trystan Davies	Lianne Francis	Liz Wilks	Sarah Rees
4.	Richard Read	Dan Cole	Keith Dewhurst	Chris von Ruhland	Baron Von Thunderclap	Ali Ahmed	Cadan ap Tomos	Elizabeth Musa	Steve Williams	Stephen Clee	Ruth Williams
5.					Michael Stephens		Bablin Molik	Chad Rickard	Helen Jones		
6.							Nigel Howells	Michael Deem	Matthew Hatton		
7.							Elizabeth Clark	Elin Walker Jones	Catherine Peace		
8.							Rhys Taylor	Glyn Wise	Seb Robyns		

=== South Wales East ===
	Abolish the Welsh Assembly Party	Communist Party of Britain	Welsh Conservative Party	Wales Green Party	Monster Raving Loony Party	Welsh Labour	Welsh Liberal Democrats	Plaid Cymru	Welsh TUSC	UK Independence Party
1.	David Pritchard	Tommy Roberts	Mohammad Asghar	Pippa Bartolotti	Baron Von Magpie	Ruth Jones	Veronica German	Steffan Lewis	Jamie Davies	Mark Reckless
2.	Roger Wilson	Mark Griffiths	Laura Jones	Ann Were	Hugo Shovit	Peter Jones	Paul Halliday	Delyth Jewell	Clare Gibbs	David Rowlands
3.	Victoria Blackman	Barbara Thomas	Chris Butler	Christopher Were	Mad Mike Young	Deborah Wilcox	Bob Griffin	Nigel Copner	David Reid	Sue Boucher
4.	Donald Wilson	Thabo Miller	Geoffrey Burrows	Katy Beddoe	Dr Doodle Do	Owen Evans	Alison Willott	Lyn Ackerman	Joshua Rawcliffe	Julie Price
5.			William Graham	Andrew Creak	Arty Pole		Brendan D'Cruz	Jonathan Clark	Mohammed Miah	
6.							Kay David	Matthew Woolfall-Jones	Rhys Pewtner	
7.							Aladdin Ayesh	Eli Jones		
8.								Gillian Jones		

=== South Wales West ===
	Abolish the Welsh Assembly Party	Communist Party of Britain	Welsh Conservative Party	Wales Green Party	Monster Raving Loony Party	Welsh Labour	Welsh Liberal Democrats	Plaid Cymru	Welsh TUSC	UK Independence Party
1.	James Cole	Laura Picand	Suzy Davies	Lisa Rapado	Baron Barnes Von Claptrap	Ceri Reeves	Peter Black	Bethan Jenkins	Owen Herbert	Caroline Jones
2.	Shaun Cuddihy	Roger Jones	Altaf Hussain	Charlotte Barlow	Sir Stevie Wonderful	Andrew Jenkins	Cheryl Green	Dai Lloyd	Claire Job	Martyn Ford
3.	Philip Hughes-Davies	Justin Lilley	Daniel Boucher	Laurence Brophy	Glyn Hyndman	Fiona Gordon	Helen Ceri Clarke	Alun Llewelyn	John Evans	Colin Beckett
4.	Shelagh Millar	Stephen Harmer	Edward Yi He	Mike Whittall	Robert William Gilis	Scott Jones	Sheila Kingston-Jones	Tim Thomas	Aaron David	Clifford Johnson
5.			Carolyn Webster	Russell Kennedy	Dewi Anthony Bowen		Anita Davies	Linet Purcell	Ronnie Job	
6.			Rebecca Singh	Thomas Muller	Peter Alban Morris		Mike Day	Philippa Richards	Emma Saunders	
7.					Margaret Jean Phillips					
8.										

== Opinion polls ==
=== Constituency vote (FPTP) ===
Date(s) conducted	Polling organisation/client	Sample size	Lab	Cons	Plaid	Lib Dem	UKIP	Others	Lead
5 May 2016	Assembly election (constituency)	1,013,383	34.7%	20.5%	21.1%	7.7%	12.5%	2.8%	13.6%
19–22 Apr 2016	YouGov/ITV Wales	1,001	33%	19%	21%	8%	15%	3%	12%
7–11 Apr 2016	YouGov/ITV Wales	1,011	35%	19%	21%	6%	17%	3%	14%
7–18 Mar 2016	Welsh Election Study/Economic & Social Research Council	3,272	34%	22%	21%	6%	15%	3%	12%
9–11 Feb 2016	YouGov/Welsh Political Barometer	TBA	34%	22%	19%	5%	18%	2%	12%
30 Nov–4 Dec 2015	YouGov/Welsh Political Barometer	1,005	35%	23%	20%	5%	15%	2%	12%
21–24 Sep 2015	YouGov/Welsh Political Barometer	1,010	39%	23%	18%	6%	13%	1%	16%
24–26 Jun 2015	YouGov/Welsh Political Barometer	1,151	35%	23%	20%	4%	15%	4%	12%
4–6 May 2015	YouGov/ITV Wales	1,202	35%	22%	21%	6%	12%	3%	13%
5–9 Mar 2015	YouGov/ITV Wales	1,279	37%	22%	20%	6%	11%	5%	15%
19–21 Jan 2015	YouGov/ITV Wales	1,036	34%	21%	18%	7%	13%	7%	13%
2–5 Dec 2014	YouGov/ITV Wales	1,131	35%	22%	19%	6%	12%	6%	13%
8–11 Sep 2014	YouGov/ITV Wales	1,025	36%	21%	19%	6%	12%	6%	15%
26 Jun–1 Jul 2014	YouGov/ITV Wales	1,035	39%	20%	19%	8%	13%	5%	19%
11–22 Apr 2014	YouGov/IPPR, Cardiff University, Edinburgh University	1,027	41%	21%	20%	8%	7%	2%	20%
10–12 Feb 2014	YouGov/ITV Wales	1,250	42%	21%	19%	9%	5%	3%	21%
2–4 Dec 2013	YouGov/ITV Wales	1,001	43%	19%	20%	9%	7%	3%	23%
18–22 Jul 2013	YouGov/Elections in Wales Blog	1,012	47%	19%	17%	8%	6%	3%	28%
28 Feb 2013	2013 Ynys Môn by-election								
18–20 Feb 2013	YouGov/ITV Wales	1,007	46%	21%	17%	10%	5%	2%	25%
5 May 2011	National Assembly for Wales election, 2011 (constituency)	949,252	42.3%	25.0%	19.3%	10.6%	N/A	2.8%	17.3%

=== Regional vote (AMS) ===
Date(s) conducted	Polling organisation/client	Sample size	Lab	Cons	Plaid	Lib Dem	UKIP	Green	Others	Lead
5 May 2016	Assembly election (regional)	1,005,541	31.5%	18.8%	20.8%	6.5%	13%	3%	6.5%	10.7%
19–22 Apr 2016	YouGov/ITV Wales	1,001	29%	19%	22%	8%	15%	4%	3%	7%
7–11 Apr 2016	YouGov/ITV Wales	1,011	31%	20%	20%	5%	16%	4%	3%	11%
7–18 Mar 2016	Welsh Election Study/Economic & Social Research Council	3,272	31%	22%	22%	5%	14%	4%	3%	9%
9–11 Feb 2016	YouGov/Welsh Political Barometer	TBA	31%	22%	19%	4%	18%	3%	3%	9%
30 Nov–4 Dec 2015	YouGov/Welsh Political Barometer	1,005	34%	23%	18%	4%	16%	4%	2%	11%
21–24 Sep 2015	YouGov/Welsh Political Barometer	1,010	34%	24%	18%	5%	14%	4%	2%	10%
24–26 Jun 2015	YouGov/Welsh Political Barometer	1,151	32%	22%	20%	5%	14%	4%	3%	10%
4–6 May 2015	YouGov/ITV Wales	1,202	32%	22%	20%	6%	13%	3%	1%	10%
5–9 Mar 2015	YouGov/ITV Wales	1,279	33%	22%	21%	5%	12%	5%	2%	11%
19–21 Jan 2015 (Note: Seat estimates are based on constituency and regional poll.)	YouGov/ITV Wales	1,036	32%	20%	15%	8%	16%	8%	2%	12%
2–5 Dec 2014	YouGov/ITV Wales	1,131	31%	20%	19%	6%	15%	7%	2%	11%
8–11 Sep 2014	YouGov/ITV Wales	1,025	31%	21%	16%	5%	17%	7%	3%	10%
26 Jun–1 Jul 2014	YouGov/ITV Wales	1,035	34%	21%	18%	5%	16%	4%	3%	13%
12–14 May 2014	YouGov/ITV Wales	1,092	35%	19%	17%	7%	14%	6%	2%	16%
11–22 Apr 2014	YouGov/IPPR, Cardiff University, Edinburgh University	1,027	37%	21%	19%	7%	10%	4%	2%	16%
10–12 Feb 2014	YouGov/ITV Wales	1,250	39%	19%	17%	9%	10%	6%		20%
2–4 Dec 2013	YouGov/ITV Wales	1,001	40%	19%	15%	9%	10%	7%		21%
18–22 Jul 2013	YouGov/Elections in Wales Blog	1,012	25%	12%	23%	9%	16%	14%		2%
28 Feb 2013	2013 Ynys Môn by-election									
18–20 Feb 2013	YouGov/ITV Wales	1,007	26%	14%	26%	8%	13%	6%	7%	Tie
5 May 2011	National Assembly for Wales election, 2011 (regional)	949,388	36.9%	22.5%	17.9%	8.0%	4.6%	3.4%	6.7%	14.4%

== Results ==
2016 Welsh Assembly election
Parties	Additional member system										Total seats		
Parties	Constituency					Region					Total seats		
Parties	Votes	%	+/−	Seats	+/−	Votes	%	+/−	Seats	+/−	Total	+/−	%
Labour	353,866	34.7	▼7.6	27	▼1	319,196	31.5	▼5.4	2	Steady	29 (Note: Includes 13 AMs sponsored by the Co-operative Party, who are designated Labour and Co-operative.)	▼1	48.3
Plaid Cymru	209,376	20.5	▲1.3	6	▲1	211,548	20.8	▲2.9	6	Steady	12	▲1	20.0
Conservative	215,597	21.1	▼3.9	6	Steady	190,846	18.8	▼3.7	5	▼3	11	▼3	18.3
UKIP	127,038	12.5	N/A	0	Steady	132,138	13.0	▲8.4	7	▲7	7	▲7	11.7
Liberal Democrats	78,165	7.7	▼2.9	1	Steady	65,504	6.5	▼1.5	0	▼4	1	▼4	1.7
Abolish	—	—	—	—	—	44,286	4.4	N/A	0	Steady	0	Steady	0.0
Green	25,202	2.5	▲2.3	0	Steady	30,211	3.0	▼0.4	0	Steady	0	Steady	0.0
Monster Raving Loony	—	—	—	—	—	5,743	0.6	▲0.5	0	Steady	0	Steady	0.0
Association of Welsh Independents	—	—	—	—	—	2,897	0.3	N/A	0	Steady	0	Steady	0.0
Women's Equality	—	—	—	—	—	2,807	0.3	N/A	0	Steady	0	Steady	0.0
Communist	—	—	—	—	—	2,452	0.2	▼0.1	0	Steady	0	Steady	0.0
TUSC	—	—	—	—	—	2,040	0.2	Steady	0	Steady	0	Steady	0.0
Independent	8,670	0.9	▼0.4	0	Steady	1,577	0.2	▲0.1	0	Steady	0	Steady	0.0
People First	—	—	—	—	—	1,496	0.1	N/A	0	Steady	0	Steady	0.0
Welsh Christian	—	—	—	—	—	1,103	0.1	▼0.8	0	Steady	0	Steady	0.0
Others	1,469	0.1	▼1.2	0	Steady	899	0.1	▼5.1	0	Steady	0	Steady	0.0

=== Votes summary ===
Popular vote
Labour	31.5%
Plaid Cymru	20.8%
Conservative	18.8%
UKIP	13.0%
Liberal Democrats	6.5%
Abolish the Welsh Assembly Party	4.4%
Green	3.0%
Other	2.0%

Assembly seats
Labour	48.3%
Plaid Cymru	20.0%
Conservative	18.3%
UKIP	11.7%
Liberal Democrats	1.7%

=== New members ===
23 of the members elected to the Assembly in the election were not members of the previous Assembly.

Constituency

- Hannah Blythyn, Labour Co-op, Delyn
- Dawn Bowden, Labour, Merthyr Tydfil and Rhymney
- Rhianon Passmore, Labour Co-op, Islwyn
- Jayne Bryant, Labour, Newport West
- Vikki Howells, Labour Co-op, Cynon Valley
- Jeremy Miles, Labour Co-op, Neath
- Hefin David, Labour, Caerphilly
- Lee Waters, Labour Co-op, Llanelli
- Huw Irranca-Davies, Labour Co-op, Ogmore
- Adam Price, Plaid Cymru, Carmarthen East and Dinefwr
- Siân Gwenllian, Plaid Cymru, Arfon
- Rebecca Evans, Labour Co-op, Gower

Regional

- Nathan Gill, UKIP, North Wales electoral region
- Michelle Brown, UKIP, North Wales electoral region
- Mark Reckless, UKIP, South Wales East electoral region
- David Rowlands, UKIP, South Wales East electoral region
- Steffan Lewis, Plaid Cymru, South Wales East electoral region
- Caroline Jones, UKIP, South Wales West electoral region
- Dai Lloyd, Plaid Cymru, South Wales West electoral region
- Neil Hamilton, UKIP, Mid and West Wales electoral region
- Eluned Morgan, Labour, Mid and West Wales electoral region
- Gareth Bennett, UKIP, South Wales Central electoral region
- Neil McEvoy, Plaid Cymru, South Wales Central electoral region

=== Constituency and regional summary ===
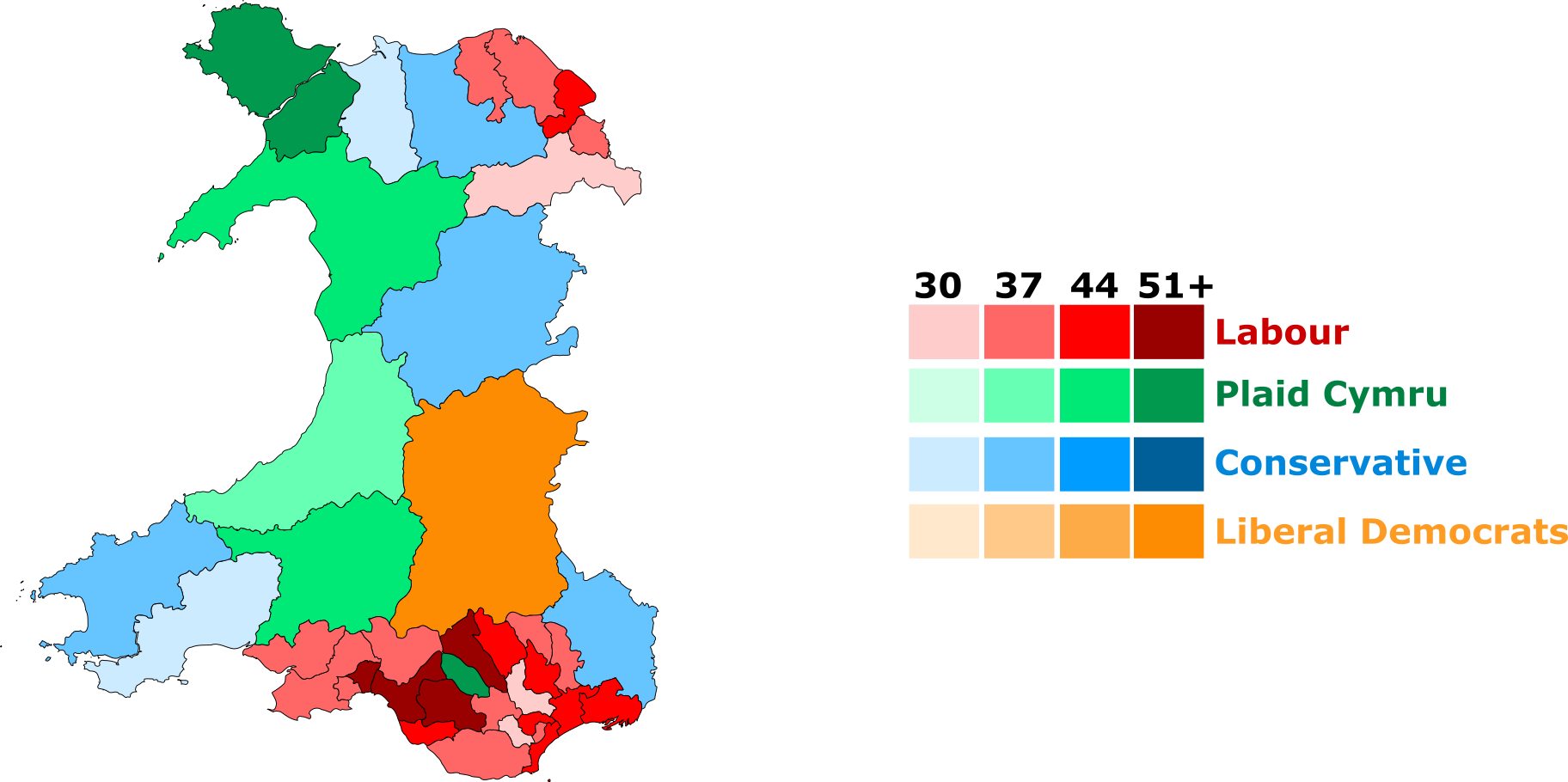
Constituency results of the 2016 Welsh Assembly election by party vote strength

==== Mid and West Wales ====
Welsh Assembly general election, 2016: Mid and West Wales
Constituency	Elected member	Result
Brecon and Radnorshire	Kirsty Williams	Liberal Democrats hold
Carmarthen East and Dinefwr	Adam Price	Plaid Cymru hold
Carmarthen West and South Pembrokeshire	Angela Burns	Conservative hold
Ceredigion	Elin Jones	Plaid Cymru hold
Dwyfor Meirionnydd	Dafydd Elis-Thomas	Plaid Cymru hold
Llanelli	Lee Waters	Labour Co-op hold
Montgomeryshire	Russell George	Conservative hold
Preseli Pembrokeshire	Paul Davies	Conservative hold

Welsh Assembly general election, 2016: Mid and West Wales
Party	Elected candidates	Seats	+/−	Votes	%	+/−%
Plaid Cymru	Simon Thomas	1	±0	56,754	26.3%	−0.5%
Conservative		0	±0	44,461	20.6%	-4.6%
Labour	Joyce Watson; Eluned Morgan	2	±0	41,975	19.4%	-3.1%
UKIP	Neil Hamilton	1	+1	25,042	11.6%	+7.2%
Liberal Democrats		0	-1	23,554	10.9%	−1.9%

==== North Wales ====
Welsh Assembly general election, 2016: North Wales
Constituency	Elected member	Result
Aberconwy	Janet Finch-Saunders	Conservative hold
Alyn and Deeside	Carl Sargeant	Labour hold
Arfon	Siân Gwenllian	Plaid Cymru hold
Clwyd South	Ken Skates	Labour hold
Clwyd West	Darren Millar	Conservative hold
Delyn	Hannah Blythyn	Labour Co-op hold
Vale of Clwyd	Ann Jones	Labour Co-op hold
Wrexham	Lesley Griffiths	Labour hold
Ynys Môn	Rhun ap Iorwerth	Plaid Cymru hold

Welsh Assembly general election, 2016: North Wales
Party	Elected candidates	Seats	+/−	Votes	%	+/−%
Labour		0	±0	57,528	28.1%	-4.0%
Plaid Cymru	Llyr Huws Gruffydd	1	±0	47,701	23.3%	+1.9%
Conservative	Mark Isherwood	1	-1	45,468	22.2%	-4.6%
UKIP	Nathan Gill; Michelle Brown	2	+2	25,518	12.5%	+7.5%
Liberal Democrats		0	-1	9,345	4.6%	−1.3%

==== South Wales Central ====
Welsh Assembly general election, 2016: South Wales Central
Constituency	Elected member	Result
Cardiff Central	Jenny Rathbone	Labour hold
Cardiff North	Julie Morgan	Labour hold
Cardiff South and Penarth	Vaughan Gething	Labour Co-op hold
Cardiff West	Mark Drakeford	Labour hold
Cynon Valley	Vikki Howells	Labour Co-op hold
Pontypridd	Mick Antoniw	Labour Co-op hold
Rhondda	Leanne Wood	Plaid Cymru gain from Labour
Vale of Glamorgan	Jane Hutt	Labour hold

Welsh Assembly general election, 2016: South Wales Central
Party	Elected candidates	Seats	+/−	Votes	%	+/−%
Labour		0	±0	78,366	33.9%	-7.1%
Plaid Cymru	Neil McEvoy	1	±0	48,357	20.9%	+7.2%
Conservative	Andrew R. T. Davies; David Melding	2	±0	42,185	18.3%	-3.7%
UKIP	Gareth Bennett	1	+1	23,958	10.4%	+6.4%
Liberal Democrats		0	-1	14,875	6.4%	−1.5%

==== South Wales East ====
Welsh Assembly general election, 2016: South Wales East
Constituency	Elected member	Result
Blaenau Gwent	Alun Davies	Labour Co-op hold
Caerphilly	Hefin David	Labour hold
Islwyn	Rhianon Passmore	Labour Co-op hold
Merthyr Tydfil and Rhymney	Dawn Bowden	Labour hold
Monmouth	Nick Ramsay	Conservative hold
Newport East	John Griffiths	Labour Co-op hold
Newport West	Jayne Bryant	Labour hold
Torfaen	Lynne Neagle	Labour Co-op hold

Welsh Assembly general election, 2016: South Wales East
Party	Elected candidates	Seats	+/−	Votes	%	+/−%
Labour		0	±0	74,424	38.3%	-7.3%
UKIP	Mark Reckless; David Rowlands	2	+2	34,524	17.8%	+12.5%
Conservative	Mohammad Asghar	1	-1	33,318	17.2%	-2.4%
Plaid Cymru	Steffan Lewis	1	-1	29,686	15.3%	+3.2%

==== South Wales West ====
Welsh Assembly general election, 2016: South Wales West
Constituency	Elected member	Result
Aberavon	David Rees	Labour hold
Bridgend	Carwyn Jones	Labour hold
Gower	Rebecca Evans	Labour Co-op hold
Neath	Jeremy Miles	Labour Co-op hold
Ogmore	Huw Irranca-Davies	Labour Co-op hold
Swansea East	Mike Hedges	Labour Co-op hold
Swansea West	Julie James	Labour hold

Welsh Assembly general election, 2016: South Wales West
Party	Elected candidates	Seats	+/−	Votes	%	+/−%
Labour		0	±0	66,903	39.5%	-6.9%
Plaid Cymru	Bethan Jenkins; David Lloyd	2	+1	29,050	17.2%	+3.4
Conservative	Suzy Davies	1	-1	25,414	15.0%	-2.8%
UKIP	Caroline Jones	1	+1	23,096	13.7%	+9.4%
Liberal Democrats		0	-1	10,946	6.5%	−0.5%

== Aftermath ==
Election of the First Minister
Ballot →	11 May 2016	18 May 2016
Required majority →	30 out of 58	N/A
Carwyn Jones (Labour): • Welsh Labour Party (28); • Welsh Liberal Democrats (1)	29 / 60	Unopposed
Leanne Wood (Plaid Cymru): • Plaid Cymru (11); • Welsh Conservative Party (11); • UK Independence Party (7)	29 / 60	Withdrew
Not voting: • Elin Jones (Presiding Officer) (1); • Ann Jones (Deputy Presiding Officer) (1)	2 / 60	

== See also ==
- Members elected
- 2016 Scottish Parliament election
- Northern Ireland Assembly election, 2016
- 2016 London mayoral election
- 2017 Welsh local elections
- 2013 Ynys Môn by-election
