= South Wales West (Senedd electoral region) =

Senedd electoral region (1999–2026)

- Gorllewin De Cymru (Welsh)
- Former Multi-member electoral region for the Senedd
- Map of South Wales West, with constituencies numbered alphabetically. Inset within Wales shown to the top with the four regional seats.
Interactive map
Interactive map of the constituency.
- Preserved counties: Mid Glamorgan (part); South Glamorgan (part); West Glamorgan

Former Multi-member electoral region
- Created: 1999
- Abolished: 2026
- Number of members: 11; 7 constituency; 4 regional
- MSs (last elected in 2021): Labour (7); Conservative (2); Plaid Cymru (2)
- Constituencies: 1. Aberavon; 2. Bridgend; 3. Gower; 4. Neath; 5. Ogmore; 6. Swansea East; 7. Swansea West

South Wales West (Welsh: Gorllewin De Cymru) was an electoral region of the Senedd, consisting of seven constituencies. The region elected 11 members, seven directly elected constituency members and four additional members. The electoral region was first used in 1999, when the National Assembly for Wales was created.

Each constituency elected one Member of the Senedd by the first past the post electoral system, and the region as a whole elected four additional or top-up Members of the Senedd, to create a degree of proportional representation. The additional member seats were allocated from closed lists by the D'Hondt method, with constituency results being taken into account in the allocation.

== County boundaries ==
Map of the boundaries prior to abolition

The region covered the whole of the preserved county of West Glamorgan, part of the preserved county of Mid Glamorgan and part of the preserved county of South Glamorgan. The rest of Mid Glamorgan was divided between the South Wales Central and South Wales East electoral regions. The rest of South Glamorgan was within the South Wales Central region.

== Electoral region profile ==
The region was predominantly urban, taking in Wales' second-largest city, Swansea, as well as working-class towns such as Neath and Port Talbot. However, there were also rural regions, such as on the Gower peninsula. A higher proportion of the local populace were Welsh speakers than in the neighbouring region, South Wales Central.

== Constituencies ==
The seven constituencies had the names and boundaries of constituencies of the House of Commons of the Parliament of the United Kingdom (Westminster):

Constituency (Note: BC denotes borough constituency, CC denotes county constituency.)	Electorate	Majority (Note: The majority is the number of votes the winning candidate receives more than their nearest rival.)	Member of the Senedd	Nearest opposition	Preserved counties
Aberavon	49,891	6,402 (30.7%)	David Rees	Victoria Griffiths	Entirely within West Glamorgan
Bridgend	62,185	5,623 (20.9%)	Sarah Murphy	Rachel Nugent-Finn	Partly Mid Glamorgan, partly South Glamorgan
Gower	62,163	1,829 (6.1%)	Rebecca Evans	Myles Langstone	Entirely within West Glamorgan
Neath	55,859	2,923 (11.5%)	Jeremy Miles	Sioned Williams	Entirely within West Glamorgan
Ogmore	56,661	9,468 (40.5%)	Huw Irranca-Davies	Luke Fletcher	Partly Mid Glamorgan, partly South Glamorgan
Swansea East	58,521	7,452 (36.2%)	Mike Hedges	Rhiannon Barrar	Entirely within West Glamorgan
Swansea West	56,892	5,080 (22.9%)	Julie James	Samantha Chohan	Entirely within West Glamorgan

== Assembly members and Members of the Senedd ==
=== Constituency AMs and MSs ===
Term	Election	Aberavon	Bridgend	Gower	Neath	Ogmore	Swansea East	Swansea West
1st	1999	Brian Gibbons (Lab)	Carwyn Jones (Lab)	Edwina Hart (Lab)	Gwenda Thomas (Lab)	Janice Gregory (Lab)	Val Feld (Lab)	Andrew Davies (Lab)
1st	2001	Brian Gibbons (Lab)	Carwyn Jones (Lab)	Edwina Hart (Lab)	Gwenda Thomas (Lab)	Janice Gregory (Lab)	Val Lloyd (Lab)	Andrew Davies (Lab)
2nd	2003	Brian Gibbons (Lab)	Carwyn Jones (Lab)	Edwina Hart (Lab)	Gwenda Thomas (Lab)	Janice Gregory (Lab)	Val Lloyd (Lab)	Andrew Davies (Lab)
3rd	2007	Brian Gibbons (Lab)	Carwyn Jones (Lab)	Edwina Hart (Lab)	Gwenda Thomas (Lab)	Janice Gregory (Lab)	Val Lloyd (Lab)	Andrew Davies (Lab)
4th	2011	David Rees (Lab)	Carwyn Jones (Lab)	Edwina Hart (Lab)	Gwenda Thomas (Lab)	Janice Gregory (Lab)	Mike Hedges (Lab)	Julie James (Lab)
5th	2016	David Rees (Lab)	Carwyn Jones (Lab)	Rebecca Evans (Lab)	Jeremy Miles (Lab)	Huw Irranca-Davies (Lab)	Mike Hedges (Lab)	Julie James (Lab)
6th	2021	David Rees (Lab)	Sarah Murphy (Lab)	Rebecca Evans (Lab)	Jeremy Miles (Lab)	Huw Irranca-Davies (Lab)	Mike Hedges (Lab)	Julie James (Lab)

=== Regional list AMs and MSs ===
N.B. This table is for presentation purposes only

Term	Election	AM / MS	AM / MS	AM / MS	AM / MS
1st	1999	Peter Black (LD)	Alun Cairns (Con)	Dai Lloyd (PC)	Janet Davies (PC)
2nd	2003	Peter Black (LD)	Alun Cairns (Con)	Dai Lloyd (PC)	Janet Davies (PC)
3rd	2007	Peter Black (LD)	Alun Cairns (Con)	Dai Lloyd (PC)	Bethan Jenkins (PC)
4th	2011	Peter Black (LD)	Suzy Davies (Con)	Byron Davies (Con)	Bethan Jenkins (PC)
4th	2015 (Note: Following his election to the House of Commons, Byron Davies resigned as an AM in May 2015 and was replaced by Altaf Hussain.)	Peter Black (LD)	Suzy Davies (Con)	Altaf Hussain (Con)	Bethan Jenkins (PC)
5th	2016	Caroline Jones (UKIP) (later Ind, BREX, Ind)	Suzy Davies (Con)	Dai Lloyd (PC)	Bethan Jenkins (PC)
5th	2018	Caroline Jones (UKIP) (later Ind, BREX, Ind)	Suzy Davies (Con)	Dai Lloyd (PC)	Bethan Jenkins (PC)
5th	2019	Caroline Jones (UKIP) (later Ind, BREX, Ind)	Suzy Davies (Con)	Dai Lloyd (PC)	Bethan Jenkins (PC)
5th	2020	Caroline Jones (UKIP) (later Ind, BREX, Ind)	Suzy Davies (Con)	Dai Lloyd (PC)	Bethan Jenkins (PC)
6th	2021	Tom Giffard (Con)	Altaf Hussain (Con)	Sioned Williams (PC)	Luke Fletcher (PC)

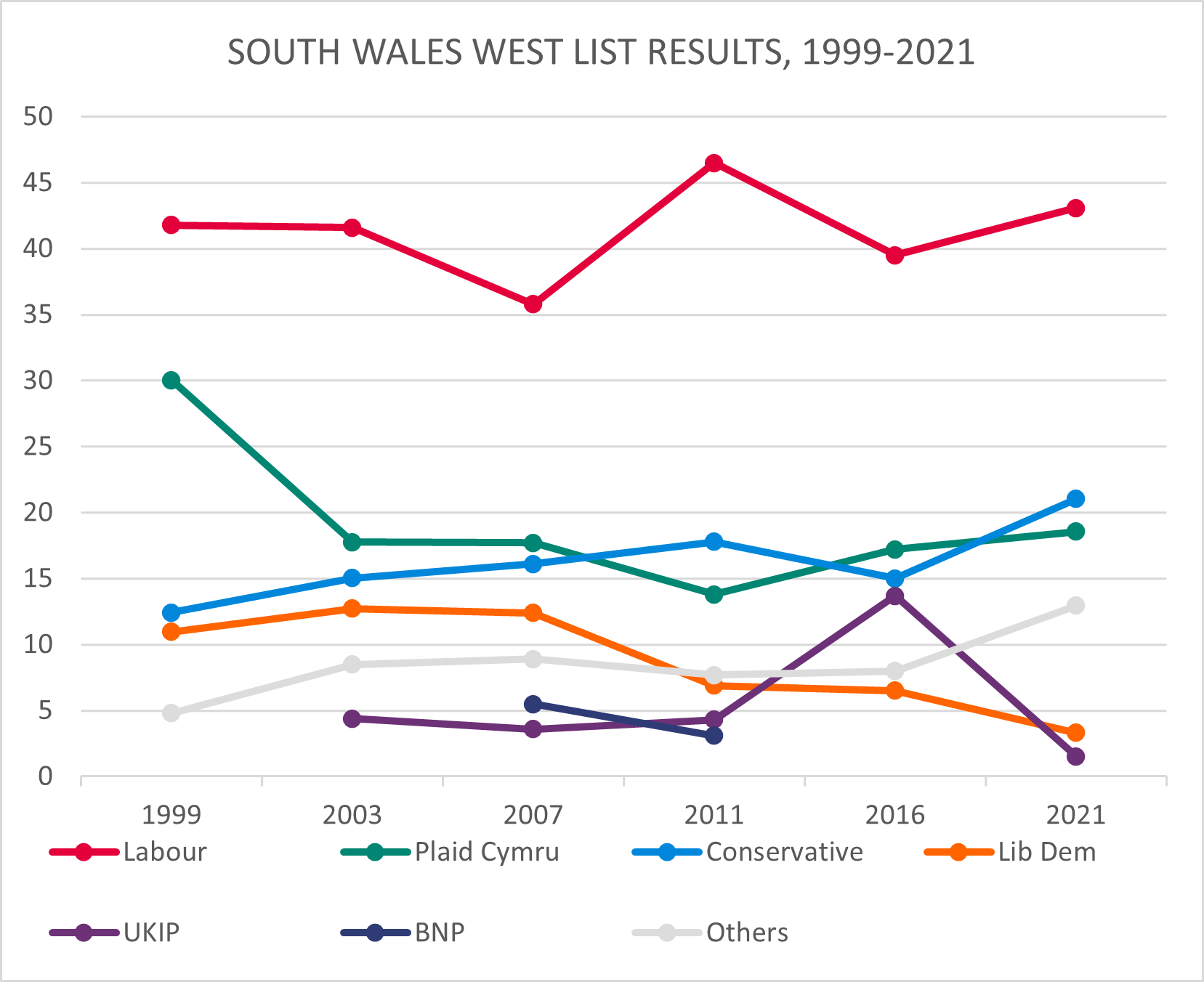
Election results since 1999 (parties who never got >5% counted as others)

=== 2021 Senedd election ===
2021 Senedd election: South Wales West
List	Candidates	Votes	Of total (%)	± from prev.
Labour	Siân Catherine James, Mahaboob Basha, Neelo Farr, Kevin Pascoe	78,318	42.9	▲3.4
Conservative	Thomas Giffard, Altaf Hussain, Samantha Chohan, Liz Hill O'Shea, Suzy Davies, Rachel Nugent-Finn	38,244	20.9	▲5.9
Plaid Cymru	Sioned Williams, Luke Fletcher, John Davies, Jamie Evans, Rhiannon Barrar, Leanne Lewis, Victoria Griffiths, Richard Sambrook, Daniel Williams, James Radcliffe	33,753	18.5	▲1.3
Green	Megan Poppy Lloyd, Chris Evans, Alex Harris, Tom Muller	7,155	3.9	▲1.3
Abolish	Simon Ross, Robin Hunter-Clarke, Sarah Allen, James Cole	6,975	3.8	▼0.4
Liberal Democrats	Chloe Hutchinson, Samuel Bennett, Harvey Jones, Helen Clarke	6,010	3.3	▼3.2
UKIP	Thomas Jenkins, Daniel Morgan, Stan Robinson, Gillian Mason	2,809	1.5	▼12.2
Independent	Caroline Jones	2,747	1.5	▲1.5
Reform	Christine Roach, Glenda Davies, Byron John, Sean Prior, Darren Rees	1,774	1.0	▲1.0
Propel	Tim Thomas, Gail John, James Henton, Lee Felrton	1,506	0.8	▲0.8
Gwlad	Geraint Jones, Wayne Erasmus, David Smith, John Young	1,306	0.7	▲0.7
Freedom Alliance	Michelle Valerio, Jonathan Tilt, Zoe Fry	1,271	0.7	▲0.7
Communist	Laura Picand, Owain Phillips, Jonathan Chilvers, Roger Jones	483	0.3	Steady
TUSC	John Evans, Karen Geraghty, Gareth Bromhall, Oisin Mulholland, Charlie Wells	345	0.2	▼0.2

== 2021 Senedd election additional members ==
Party	Constituency seats	List votes (vote %)	D'Hondt entitlement	Additional members elected	Total members elected	Deviation from D'Hondt entitlement
Labour	7	78,318 (43.07%)	6	0	7	+1
Conservative	0	38,244 (21.03%)	3	2	2	-1
Plaid Cymru	0	33,753 (18.56%)	2	2	2	0
Green	0	7,155 (3.93%)	0	0	0	0
Abolish	0	6,976 (3.84%)	0	0	0	0
Liberal Democrats	0	6,010 (3.31%)	0	0	0	0
UKIP	0	2,809 (1.54%)	0	0	0	0
Independent - Jones	0	2,747 (1.51%)	0	0	0	0
Reform	0	1,774 (0.98%)	0	0	0	0
Propel	0	1,506 (0.82%)	0	0	0	0
Gwlad	0	1,306 (0.72%)	0	0	0	0
Freedom Alliance	0	1,271 (0.70%)	0	0	0	0
Communist	0	483 (0.27%)	0	0	0	0
TUSC	0	345 (0.19%)	0	0	0	0

=== Regional MSs elected 2021 ===
Party	Name
Conservative	Tom Giffard
Plaid Cymru	Sioned Williams
Conservative	Altaf Hussain
Plaid Cymru	Luke Fletcher

== 2016 Welsh Assembly election additional members ==
In the 2016 National Assembly for Wales election, the results for additional members were as follows:

Party	Constituency seats	List votes (vote %)	D'Hondt entitlement	Additional members elected	Total members elected	Deviation from D'Hondt entitlement
Labour	7	66,903 (39.5%)	5	0	7	+2
Plaid Cymru	0	29,050 (17.2%)	2	2	2	0
Conservative	0	25,414 (15.0%)	2	1	1	-1
UKIP	0	23,096 (13.7%)	2	1	1	-1
Liberal Democrats	0	10,946 (6.5%)	0	0	0	0
Abolish the Welsh Assembly	0	7,137 (4%)	0	0	0	0
Green	0	4,420 (3%)	0	0	0	0
Official Monster Raving Loony Party	0	1,106 (1%)	0	0	0	0
TUSC	0	686 (0%)	0	0	0	0
Welsh Communist Party	0	431 (0%)	0	0	0	0

=== Regional AMs elected 2016 ===
Party	Name
Plaid Cymru	Bethan Jenkins
Plaid Cymru	David Lloyd
Conservative	Suzy Davies
UKIP	Caroline Jones

== 2011 Welsh Assembly election additional members ==
In the 2011 National Assembly for Wales election, the results for additional members were as follows:

Party	Constituency seats	List votes (vote %)	D'Hondt entitlement	Additional members elected	Total members elected	Deviation from D'Hondt entitlement
Labour	7	71,766 (46.5%)	6	0	7	+1
Conservative	0	27,457 (17.8%)	2	2	2	0
Plaid Cymru	0	21,258 (13.8%)	2	1	1	−1
Liberal Democrats	0	10,683 (6.9%)	1	1	1	0
UKIP	0	6,619 (4.3%)	0	0	0	0
Socialist Labour	0	5,057 (3.3%)	0	0	0	0
BNP	0	4,714 (3.1%)	0	0	0	0
Green	0	3,952 (2.6%)	0	0	0	0
Welsh Christian	0	1,602 (1.0%)	0	0	0	0
TUSC	0	809 (0.5%)	0	0	0	0
Communist	0	464 (0.3%)	0	0	0	0

=== Regional AMs elected 2011 ===
Party	Name
Conservative	Byron Davies †
Conservative	Suzy Davies
Liberal Democrats	Peter Black
Plaid Cymru	Bethan Jenkins

† Resigned as AM following his election to the UK House of Commons on 7 May 2015; replaced by Altaf Hussain from 19 May 2015.

== 2007 Welsh Assembly election additional members ==
In the election for additional members in the 2007 National Assembly for Wales election, the results were as follows:

Party	Constituency seats	List votes (vote %)	D'Hondt entitlement	Additional members elected	Total members elected	Deviation from D'Hondt entitlement
Labour	7	58,374 (35.8%)	5	0	7	+2
Plaid Cymru	0	28,819 (17.7%)	2	2	2	0
Conservative	0	26,119 (16.1%)	2	1	1	−1
Liberal Democrats	0	20,226 (12.4%)	2	1	1	-1
BNP	0	8,993 (5.5%)	0	0	0	0
Green	0	6,130 (3.8%)	0	0	0	0
UKIP	0	5,914 (3.6%)	0	0	0	0
Socialist Labour	0	2,367 (1.5%)	0	0	0	0
Welsh Christian	0	1,685 (1.0%)	0	0	0	0
Independent	0	1,186 (0.7%)	0	0	0	0
Socialist	0	1,027 (0.6%)	0	0	0	0
Respect	0	713 (0.4%)	0	0	0	0
Ind. Conservative	0	582 (0.4%)	0	0	0	0
Communist	0	546 (0.3%)	0	0	0	0
CPA	0	393 (0.2%)	0	0	0	0

== 2003 Welsh Assembly election additional members ==
In the election for additional members in the 2003 National Assembly for Wales election, the results were as follows:

Party	Constituency seats	List votes (vote %)	D'Hondt entitlement	Additional members elected	Total members elected	Deviation from D'Hondt entitlement
Labour	7	58,066 (41.61%)	6	0	7	+1
Plaid Cymru	0	24,799 (17.77%)	2	2	2	0
Conservative	0	20,981 (15.03%)	2	1	1	-1
Liberal Democrats	0	17,746 (12.72%)	1	1	1	0
Green	0	6,696 (4.80%)	0	0	0	0
UKIP	0	6,113 (4.38%)	0	0	0	0
Socialist Labour	0	3,446 (2.47%)	0	0	0	0
Cymru Annibynnol	0	1,346 (0.96%)	0	0	0	0
ProLife Alliance	0	355 (0.25%)	0	0	0	0

== 1999 Welsh Assembly election additional members ==
In the election for additional members in the 1999 National Assembly for Wales election, the results were as follows:

Party	Constituency seats	List votes (vote %)	D'Hondt entitlement	Additional members elected	Total members elected	Deviation from D'Hondt entitlement
Labour	7	70,625 (41.79%)	5	0	7	+2
Plaid Cymru	0	50,757 (30.04%)	4	2	2	−2
Conservative	0	20,993 (12.42%)	1	1	1	0
Liberal Democrats	0	18,527 (10.96%)	1	1	1	0
Green	0	4,082 (2.42%)	0	0	0	0
People's Representative	0	2,074 (1.23%)	0	0	0	0
Socialist Alliance	0	1,257 (0.74%)	0	0	0	0
Natural Law	0	676 (0.40%)	0	0	0	0
