= Islwyn (Senedd constituency) =

Senedd constituency (1999–2026)

Coordinates: 51.653°N 3.190°W

- Former Senedd county constituency for the Senedd
- Islwyn shown as one of the 40; Senedd constituencies

Former Senedd county constituency
- Created: 1999
- Abolished: 2026
- Party: Labour
- MS: Rhianon Passmore
- Electoral region: South Wales East

Islwyn (Welsh pronunciation: [ˈɪslʊɨn]) was a constituency of the Senedd. It elected one Member of the Senedd by the first past the post method of election. Also, however, it was one of eight constituencies in the South Wales East electoral region, which elected four additional members, in addition to eight constituency members, to produce a degree of proportional representation for the region as a whole.

== Boundaries ==
Map of 1999–2026 boundaries

The constituency was created for the first election to the Assembly, in 1999, with the name and boundaries of the Islwyn Westminster constituency.

The other seven constituencies of the South Wales East electoral region were Blaenau Gwent, Caerphilly, Merthyr Tydfil and Rhymney, Monmouth, Newport East, Newport West and Torfaen.

== Voting ==
In general elections for the Senedd, each voter had two votes. The first vote was used to vote for a candidate to become the Member of the Senedd for the voter's constituency, elected by the first past the post system. The second vote was used to vote for a regional closed party list of candidates. Additional member seats were allocated from the lists by the d'Hondt method, with constituency results being taken into account in the allocation.

== Assembly Members and Members of the Senedd ==
Election	Member	Party	Portrait
1999	Brian Hancock	Plaid Cymru	
2003	Irene James	Labour	
2011	Gwyn R Price	Labour	
2016	Rhianon Passmore	Labour	

== Results ==
=== Elections in the 2020s ===
2021 Senedd election: Islwyn
Party	Candidate	Constituency			Regional		
Party	Candidate	Votes	%	±%	Votes	%	±%
Labour Co-op	Rhianon Passmore (Note: Incumbent member for this constituency)	9,962	40.7	-4.3	10,845	46.1	+1.6
Independent	Kevin Etheridge	4,723	19.3	New	N/A	N/A	N/A
Plaid Cymru	Rhys Mills	3,930	16.1	-3.4	4,072	17.3	+0.6
Conservative	Gavin Chambers	3,894	15.9	+7.9	4,837	20.6	+12.3
Abolish	Michael Ford	568	2.3	New	1,190	5.1	+1.3
UKIP	Neil Hamilton	507	2.1	-20.1	621	2.6	-18.4
Liberal Democrats	Oliver Townsend	476	1.9	-0.8	572	2.4	+0.1
Gwlad					462	2.0	New
Reform	James Wells	421	1.7	New	452	1.9	New
No More Lockdowns					194	0.8	New
Propel					113	0.5	New
Communist					87	0.4	+0.2
TUSC					55	0.2	-0.2
Majority		5,239	21.4	−1.4			
Turnout		24,613	42.48	+1.7			
Labour hold		Swing					
Notes

Regional Ballot void votes: 198. Want of an Official Mark (0), Voting for more than ONE party or individual candidate (57), Writing or mark by which the Voter could be identified (0), Unmarked or Void for uncertainty (141)

=== Elections in the 2010s ===
Welsh Assembly Election 2016: Islwyn
Party	Candidate	Constituency			Regional		
Party	Candidate	Votes	%	±%	Votes	%	±%
Labour	Rhianon Passmore	10,050	45.0	−12.9	9,935	44.5	-7.1
UKIP	Joe Smyth	4,944	22.2	New	4,683	21.0	+15.7
Plaid Cymru	Lyn Ackerman	4,349	19.5	−2.2	3,740	16.7	-0.7
Conservative	Paul Williams	1,775	8.0	−3.9	1,853	8.3	-2.0
Liberal Democrats	Matthew Kidner	597	2.7	−0.4	512	2.3	-0.8
Green	Katy Beddoe	594	2.7	New	449	2.0	-0.1
Abolish					844	3.8	New
Monster Raving Loony					126	0.6	New
TUSC					98	0.4	New
National Front					51	0.2	New
Communist					46	0.2	-0.1
Majority		5,106	22.8	−13.4			
Turnout		22,309	40.8	+2.5			
Labour hold		Swing					

Welsh Assembly Election 2011: Islwyn
Party	Candidate	Constituency			Regional		
Party	Candidate	Votes	%	±%	Votes	%	±%
Labour	Gwyn R Price	12,116	57.9	+20.2	10,804	51.6	
Plaid Cymru	Steffan Lewis	4,527	21.7	+0.1	3,640	17.4	
Conservative	David Chipp	2,497	11.9	+4.3	2,161	10.3	
BNP	Peter Whalley	1,115	5.3	New	944	4.5	
Liberal Democrats	Tom Sullivan	653	3.1	−1.7	657	3.1	
UKIP					1,102	5.3	
Socialist Labour					680	3.2	
Green					444	2.1	
Welsh Christian					355	1.7	
English Democrat					87	0.4	New
Communist					63	0.3	
Majority		7,589	36.2	+26.8			
Turnout		20,908	38.3	−4.7			
Labour hold		Swing	+10.1				

Regional ballots rejected at the count: 134

=== Elections in the 2000s ===
Welsh Assembly Election 2007: Islwyn
Party	Candidate	Constituency			Regional		
Party	Candidate	Votes	%	±%	Votes	%	±%
Labour	Irene James	8,883	37.7	−18.2	9,925	42.3	-11.0
Independent	Kevin Etheridge	6,665	28.3	New			
Plaid Cymru	Alan Pritchard	5,084	21.6	+2.7	5,049	21.5	+4.3
Conservative	Paul Williams	1,797	7.6	−1.5	2,283	9.7	-1.5
Liberal Democrats	Mark Maguire	1,135	4.8	−1.3	1,482	6.3	-1.6
UKIP					1,221	5.2	+3.2
BNP					1,213	5.2	+3.5
Green					629	2.7	-0.5
Independent - Colin Hobbs					612	2.6	New
Socialist Labour					428	1.8	-0.8
Welsh Christian Party					375	1.6	New
English Democrat					108	0.5	New
CPA					76	0.3	New
Communist					70	0.3	New
Majority		2,218	9.4	−26.3			
Turnout		23,564	43.0	+3.6			
Labour hold		Swing	+23.3				

Welsh Assembly Election 2003: Islwyn
Party	Candidate	Constituency			Regional		
Party	Candidate	Votes	%	±%	Votes	%	±%
Labour	Irene James	11,246	55.2	+15.8	10,874	53.3	+10.7
Plaid Cymru	Brian Hancock	3,926	19.3	−22.7	3,516	17.2	-25.4
Tinker Against the Assembly	Paul Taylor	2,201	10.8	New			
Conservative	Terri-Anne Matthews	1,848	9.1	+2.3	2,283	11.2	+4.3
Liberal Democrats	Huw Price	1,268	6.2	−3.6	1,607	7.9	-1.7
Green					656	3.2	Unknown
Socialist Labour					524	2.6	Unknown
UKIP					415	2.0	New
BNP					337	1.7	New
Cymru Annibynnol					144	0.7	New
ProLife Alliance					50	0.2	New
Majority		7,320	35.9	N/A			
Turnout		20,489	39.6	−7.7			
Labour gain from Plaid Cymru		Swing	+19.4				

2003 Electorate: 51,170
Regional ballots rejected: 316

=== Elections in the 1990s ===
Welsh Assembly Election 1999: Islwyn
Party	Candidate	Constituency			Regional		
Party	Candidate	Votes	%	±%	Votes	%	±%
Plaid Cymru	Brian Hancock	10,042	42.0	N/A	10,209	42.6	N/A
Labour	Shane Williams	9,438	39.4	N/A	8,604	35.9	N/A
Liberal Democrats	Caroline J. Bennett	2,351	9.8	N/A	2,299	9.6	N/A
Conservative	Chris Stevens	1,621	6.8	N/A	1,640	6.9	N/A
Socialist Alliance	Ian Thomas	475	2.0	N/A	100	0.4	N/A
Others					1,085	4.5	N/A
Majority		604	2.6	N/A			
Turnout		23,927	42.48	N/A			
Plaid Cymru win (new seat)							
