= Catherine Thomas =

Welsh politician (born 1963)

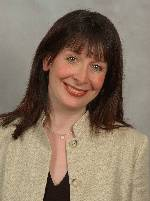

Member of the Welsh Assembly for Llanelli
- In office 1 May 2003 – 3 May 2007
- Preceded by: Helen Mary Jones
- Succeeded by: Helen Mary Jones

Personal details
- Born: 1963 (age 62–63)
- Party: Labour
- Education: University of Glamorgan (now the University of South Wales), Cardiff University

Catherine Thomas (born in 1963) is a Welsh politician and former Labour Welsh Assembly Member for the constituency of Llanelli. She narrowly beat Helen Mary Jones of Plaid Cymru at the 2003 Assembly election with a majority of 21. Helen Mary Jones defeated her in the 2007 election.

== Education ==
University of Glamorgan (now the University of South Wales) and the University of Wales, Cardiff.

== Professional career ==
Board member of a housing association and member of Children in Wales.

== Political career ==
Aide to Julie Morgan MP, 1997–2003. Welsh Assembly Member for the constituency of Llanelli 2003–07.
