= Swansea West (Senedd constituency) =

Senedd constituency (1999–2026)

Coordinates: 51°37′06″N 3°59′11″W

Swansea West Gorllewin Abertawe
- Former Senedd borough constituency for the Senedd
- Swansea West shown as one of the 40; Senedd constituencies

Former Senedd borough constituency
- Created: 1999
- Abolished: 2026
- Party: Labour
- MS: Julie James
- Electoral region: South Wales West
- Preserved county: West Glamorgan

Swansea West (Welsh: Gorllewin Abertawe) was a constituency of the Senedd. It elected one Member of the Senedd by the first past the post method of election. It was also one of seven constituencies in the South Wales West electoral region, which elected four additional members, in addition to seven constituency members, to produce a degree of proportional representation for the region as a whole.

== Boundaries ==
Map of 1999–2026 boundaries

The constituency was created for the first election to the Assembly, in 1999, with the name and boundaries of the Swansea West Westminster constituency. It was entirely within the preserved county of West Glamorgan.

The other six constituencies of the region were Aberavon, Bridgend, Gower, Neath, Ogmore and Swansea East.

== Assembly members and Members of the Senedd ==
Election	Member	Party	Portrait
1999	Andrew Davies	Labour Party	
2011	Julie James	Labour Party	

== Voting ==
In elections for the Senedd, each voter had two votes. The first vote was used to vote for a candidate to become the Member of the Senedd for the voter's constituency, elected by the first past the post system. The second vote was used to vote for a regional closed party list of candidates. Additional member seats were allocated from the lists by the d'Hondt method, with constituency results being taken into account in the allocation.

== Election results ==
=== Elections in the 2020s ===
2021 Senedd election: Swansea West
Party	Candidate	Constituency			Regional		
Party	Candidate	Votes	%	±%	Votes	%	±%
Labour	Julie James (Note: Incumbent member for this constituency)	11,126	46.4	+5.8	10,005	41.7	+6.3
Conservative	Samantha Chohan	4,605	19.2	+1.5	4,549	18.9	+3.1
Plaid Cymru	Dai Lloyd	3,910	16.3	+1.8	4,082	17.0	+2.1
Liberal Democrats	Chloe Hutchinson	1,645	6.9	-2.2	1,667	6.9	-4.0
Green	Chris Evans	1,109	4.6	+0.6	1,337	5.6	+1.4
Abolish	James Cole	866	3.6	New	970	4.0	-0.6
Reform UK	Darren Rees	295	1.2	New	203	0.8	New
Freedom Alliance (UK)	Michelle Valerio	250	1.0	New	231	1.0	New
Propel	Katon Bouzalakos	189	0.8	New	151	0.6	New
UKIP					363	1.5	-11.4
Independent	Caroline Jones				209	0.9	New
Gwlad					114	0.5	New
Communist					70	0.3	+0.1
TUSC					57	0.2	-0.3
Majority		6,521	27.2	+4.3			
Turnout		24,162					
Labour hold		Swing					
Notes

Regional Ballot void votes: 141. Want of an Official Mark (0), Voting for more than ONE party or individual candidate (39), Writing or mark by which the Voter could be identified (14), Unmarked or Void for uncertainty (97)

=== Elections in the 2010s ===
2016 National Assembly for Wales election: Swansea West
Party	Candidate	Constituency			Regional		
Party	Candidate	Votes	%	±%	Votes	%	±%
Labour	Julie James	9,014	40.6	−4.7	7,848	35.4	-3.0
Conservative	Craig Lawton	3,934	17.7	−6.3	3,511	15.8	-4.9
Plaid Cymru	Dai Lloyd	3,225	14.5	+0.6	3,296	14.9	+3.1
UKIP	Rosie Irwin	3,058	13.8	New	2,853	12.9	+8.5
Liberal Democrats	Christopher Holley	2,012	9.1	−7.7	2,425	10.9	-2.6
Green	Gareth Tucker	883	4.0	New	931	4.2	-0.1
Socialist (GB)	Brian Johnson	76	0.3	New			
Abolish					1,012	4.6	New
Monster Raving Loony					153	0.7	New
TUSC					111	0.5	-0.2
Communist					48	0.2	-0.2
Majority		5,080	22.9	+1.6			
Turnout		22,345	40.7	+5.6			
Labour hold		Swing					

Welsh Assembly Election 2011: Swansea West
Party	Candidate	Constituency			Regional		
Party	Candidate	Votes	%	±%	Votes	%	±%
Labour	Julie James	9,885	45.3	+13.0	8,418	38.4	+12.6
Conservative	Steve Jenkins	5,231	24.0	+4.9	4,535	20.7	+2.3
Liberal Democrats	Rob Speht	3,654	16.8	-8.9	2,966	13.5	-8.0
Plaid Cymru	Carl Harris	3,035	13.9	−1.8	2,593	11.8	-4.0
UKIP					971	4.4	+0.5
Green					943	4.3	-0.5
Socialist Labour					537	2.4	+1.3
BNP					527	2.4	-2.8
Welsh Christian					214	1.0	0.0
TUSC					148	0.7	New
Communist					85	0.4	±0.0
Majority		4,654	21.3	+14.7			
Turnout		21,805	35.1	−20.6			
Labour hold		Swing	+4.1				

Regional ballots rejected: 214

=== Elections in the 2000s ===
Welsh Assembly Election 2007: Swansea West
Party	Candidate	Constituency			Regional		
Party	Candidate	Votes	%	±%	Votes	%	±%
Labour	Andrew Davies	7,393	32.3	-3.9	5,903	25.8	-4.9
Liberal Democrats	Peter May	5,882	25.7	+7.6	4,917	21.5	+5.0
Conservative	Harri Davies	4,379	19.1	+3.1	4,205	18.4	-1.5
Plaid Cymru	Ian Titherington	3,583	15.7	-7.3	3,625	15.8	-3.4
BNP					1,186	5.2	New
Green					1,100	4.8	-3.4
UKIP					901	3.9	-1.5
Socialist Labour					248	1.1	New
Welsh Christian					225	1.0	New
Respect					215	0.9	New
Socialist Alternative (UK)					140	0.6	New
Keith James - Independent					92	0.4	New
Communist					88	0.4	New
CPA					51	0.2	New
Joel Jenkins - Independent					18	0.1	New
Majority		3,955	6.6	−6.6			
Turnout		30,108	55.7	+5.7			
Labour hold		Swing					
Notes

Welsh Assembly Election 2003: Swansea West
Party	Candidate	Constituency			Regional		
Party	Candidate	Votes	%	±%	Votes	%	±%
Labour	Andrew Davies (Note: Incumbent member for this constituency)	7,023	36.2	+1.6	5,910	30.7	
Plaid Cymru	Dai Lloyd	4,461	23.0	-3.5	3,702	19.2	
Liberal Democrats	Mike Day	3,510	18.1	+3.2	3,170	16.5	
Conservative	Gerald Rowbottom	3,106	16.0	+0.6	3,256	16.9	
Green					1,571	8.2	
UKIP					1,040	5.4	
Socialist Labour					429	2.2	
Cymru Annibynnol					127	0.7	
ProLife Alliance					33	0.2	
Majority		2,562	13.2	+5.1			
Turnout		19,412	33.0	−7.0			
Labour hold		Swing	+0.5				

2003 Electorate: 58,749
Regional ballots rejected: 460

=== Elections in the 1990s ===
Welsh Assembly Election 1999: Swansea West
Party	Candidate	Constituency			Regional		
Party	Candidate	Votes	%	±%	Votes	%	±%
Labour	Andrew Davies	8,217	34.6	N/A	7,944	33.5	N/A
Plaid Cymru	Dai Lloyd	6,291	26.5	N/A	6,700	28.3	N/A
Conservative	Paul Harold Valerio	3,643	15.4	N/A	4,033	17.0	N/A
Liberal Democrats	John Newbury	3,543	14.9	N/A	3,413	14.4	N/A
Independent	David C. Evans	996	4.2	N/A			
People's Representative	John R. Harris	774	3.3	N/A			
Socialist Alliance	Alec Thraves	263	1.1	N/A	216	0.9	N/A
Green					846	3.6	
Natural Law					104	0.4	N/A
Other List Parties					456	1.9	
Majority		1,926	8.1	N/A			
Turnout		23,727	40.0	N/A			
Labour win (new seat)							

1999 Electorate: 59,369

== See also ==
- Swansea West (UK Parliament constituency)
