= Lee Waters =

Welsh Labour & Co-operative politician and Member of the Senedd for Llanelli

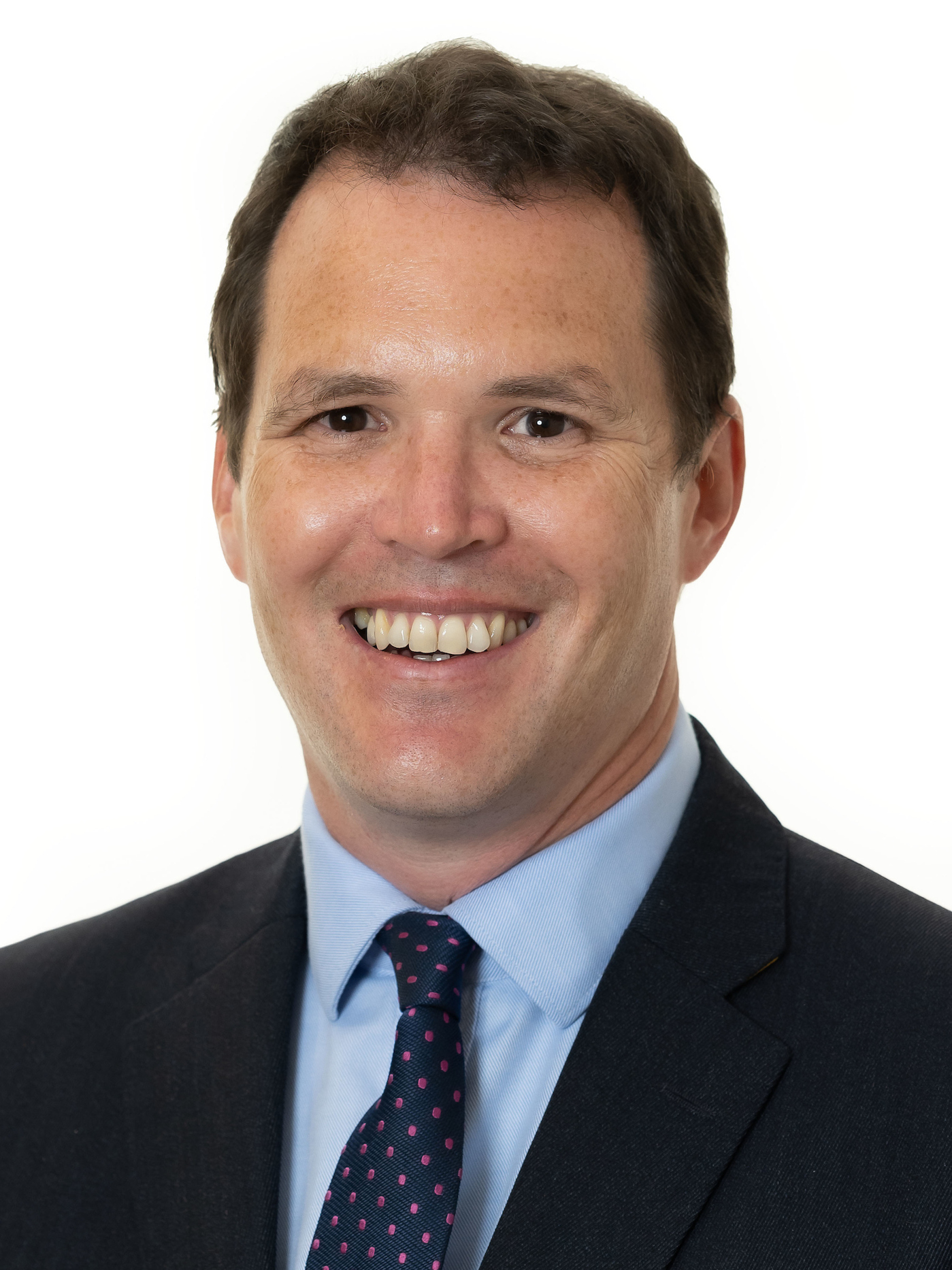
- Official portrait, 2021

Deputy Minister for Climate Change
- In office 13 May 2021 – 20 March 2024
- First Minister: Mark Drakeford
- Preceded by: Office established
- Succeeded by: Office abolished

Deputy Minister for Economy and Transport
- In office 14 December 2018 – 13 May 2021
- First Minister: Mark Drakeford
- Preceded by: Office established
- Succeeded by: Office abolished

Member of the Senedd for Llanelli
- In office 6 May 2016 – 7 April 2026
- Preceded by: Keith Davies
- Majority: 5,675 (18.8%)

Personal details
- Born: 12 February 1976 (age 50) Amman Valley, Wales
- Party: Welsh Labour and Co-operative
- Children: 2
- Education: University of Wales, Aberystwyth
- Occupation: Politician, journalist
- Website: https://amanwy.blogspot.com/
- Lee Waters's voice Waters on clean air Recorded 17 June 2021

Lee Waters (born 12 February 1976) is a Welsh Labour and Co-operative politician who served as Deputy Minister for Climate Change from 2021 to 2024. He served as the Member of the Senedd (MS) for Llanelli from 2016 until 2026.

== Early life ==
Waters grew up in Ammanford. His father was a coal miner who was made redundant and his mother was a hairdresser. He has stated he did not grow up in a political or "militant" family but remembered his father, who was supportive of a ballot rather than industrial action at the time, going on strike.

He studied at Amman Valley Comprehensive School and while at school wrote a piece for Wales on Sunday about his fellow students, asking whether they were planning on staying in their community. He found many were keen to leave. He has criticised those who told him at 15 that "if you want to get on, you have to get out".

== Education ==
Waters grew up with an interest in current affairs and kept scrap books of newspapers. He was in a class of three studying politics in school, and later was the only student in the class.

He went to study at University of Wales, Aberystwyth. He joined the Labour Party in 1994 upon starting his studies and went on to the university's Parliamentary Placement Scheme where he worked in Westminster. Upon graduating he took a year out to work for his local MP Dr Alan Williams during the 1997 general election. This was followed by an internship in the United States House of Representatives as an ESU Capitol Hill Scholar for a summer.

== Career ==
After graduating, Waters received multiple job offers: from the PPS to the Secretary of State for Wales Nick Ainger, from Peter Hain MP, and from Welsh Secretary Ron Davies MP. He went on to work as the Political Secretary to Davies in August 1998 as part of the leadership campaign between him and Rhodri Morgan. Davies won the election for leader, but resigned from it and the Cabinet a month later after his "Moment of Madness" and resignation in 1998.

He then joined BBC Wales news as a researcher and then radio producer on Good Morning Wales. In 2001 Waters joined the ITV Wales political unit where he reported as a lobby correspondent and presented the weekly politics programme Waterfront, becoming chief political correspondent. He stated he moved out of the industry after he lost interest in learning shorthand and did not see it as a job "for a grown up".

He chaired the Governing body of the highly regarded Barry Island Primary School for over seven years.

In 2007, he became Director of the green transport organisation, Sustrans Cymru.

Waters joined sustainable cycling charity Sustrans Cymru in January 2007. He led a campaign involving his organisation Sustrans Cymru, the BMA, and the NAHT, who wrote a joint letter arguing for an independent commission to review whether the National Assembly for Wales was underfunded. This campaign formed the groundwork for the Holtham Commission.

He was vice-chair of the successful 2011 Yes for Wales campaign, leading on communications for the campaign after being appointed to the cross-party steering committee by the First Minister.

In 2013, he was appointed the director of the Welsh independent think-tank, the Institute of Welsh Affairs. Upon joining the organisation he found it to be "nearly bankrupt" with tired staff and three months of funding left, and described his time in the role as highly fundraising-orientated. During his three years leading the independent policy institute he refreshed the charity, stabilising its finances, overhauling its systems and setting a new strategy. He edited the magazine, the Welsh Agenda, and contributed to the pioneering of crowdsourcing in policy development. He left the role in 2016 in order to campaign to become the Senedd Member for Llanelli, a race which he won with a majority of 382.

=== Transport Ministry ===
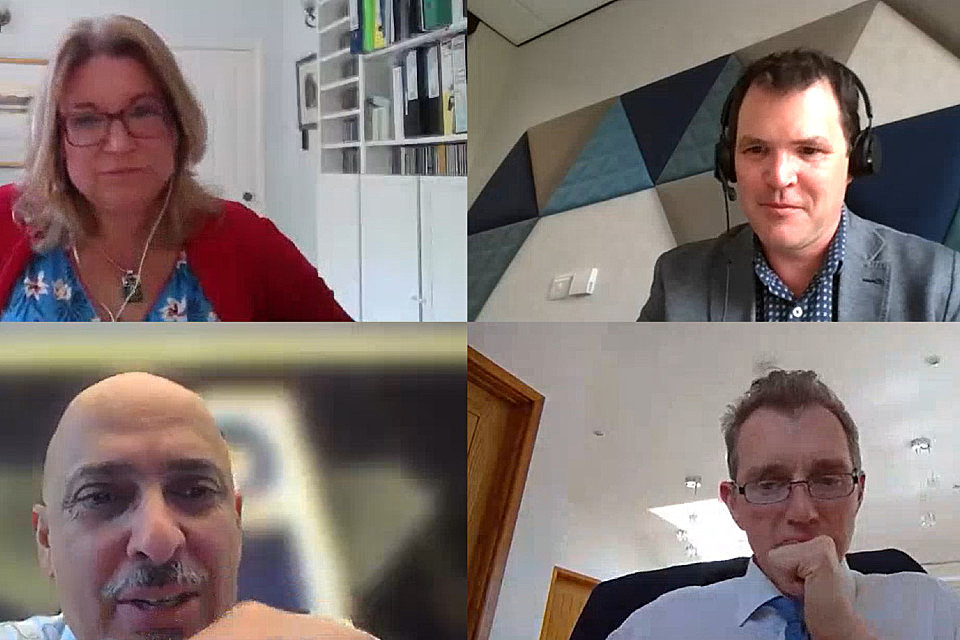
Waters (top-right) in a joint meeting in April 2020, between Ministers from the Welsh and British Governments, to underline joint commitment to support businesses through the COVID-19 pandemic. Also present UK Government Minister for Business and Industry Nadhim Zahawi (bottom-left) and UK Government Minister for Wales David TC Davies (bottom-right)

In December 2018 he became Deputy Minister for Economy and Transport with additional responsibility for the Welsh Government's Strategic Communications. He led work on creating a Digital Strategy for Wales and in developing the Foundational Economy including a £4.5m Challenge Fund to trial new approaches.

Along with Julie James, the Minister for Climate Change, Waters announced in 2021 a freeze on all new road building projects in Wales pending a Welsh Government roads review. The decision is motivated by the government's goal to cut emissions and drive modal shift to public transportation. Both Plaid and Conservative MS' voiced concerns about the plan.

In 2023, as a Welsh Government minister, Waters accidentally voted against the government, with Waters describing it as "embarrassing and frustrating".

In March 2024, Waters announced his intention to resign from his position as Deputy Minister for Climate Change following the conclusion of the 2024 Welsh Labour leadership election, as well as announcing he would be deleting his Twitter account due to unpleasant comments. Andrew RT Davies, opposition and Welsh Conservative leader, described his announcement as a "sigh of relief" for motorists and business owners, due to Waters' policies during his time in the position.

In June 2024, Waters, alongside Welsh Labour colleague Hannah Blythyn, was not present for a vote of no confidence in First Minister Vaughan Gething due to illness.

On 24 October 2024, Waters announced his retirement at the 2026 Senedd election.

== Political views ==
=== Transport ===
Waters was the Minister responsible for Transportation across various ministerial jobs from 2018 to 2024.

While Minister responsible for transport he opposed the M4 Relief Road which he viewed as failing to improve transport within Wales. He was critical of the decision taken by the UK Government under Theresa May to remove the tolls on the Severn crossings, stating it would "lead to six million more vehicles a year" on the roads, and that Westminster were "unleashing" extra traffic to try to incentivise the construction of the M4 Relief Road.

In place of the Relief Road, Waters instead advocated for in Government projects including the South Wales Metro and improving bus services which make up the majority of public transport ridership in Wales. He worked towards overhauling bus transport in Wales through integrating services and focusing on passengers. Shortly before he resigned as transport minister, the Welsh Government published a report entitled "Our Roadmap to Bus Reform: Towards One Network, One Timetable, One Ticket", which outlined these policies and how they would be implemented.

Waters was a central figure in the introduction of a 20mph limit across most previously 30mph zones on Welsh roads. Its introduction faced public opposition, although Waters claimed attitudes were changing on the policy. In the year after its implementation, insurer esure said they had seen a 20% drop in insurance claims from Wales, and there was a reduction in road traffic fatalities in the last quarter of the year of 32%, from 681 (October–December 2022) to 463 (October–December 2023).

=== Foundational economy ===
Waters has been a proponent of the concept of the foundational economy. The concept was developed by the University of Manchester's Centre for Research on Socio-Cultural Change. Bowman and Froud et al. describe the theory as focussing on health education and welfare, as well as "mundane activities like utilities, retail and food processing which produce necessary everyday goods and services which are used by everybody regardless of income or social status." It "focuses on how the sheltered sectors of the economy can be reorganised in ways that generate welfare gains and diffuse prosperity" after years of UK policies which its authors state failed to create competition and markets and instead focussed on job creation and GDP growth alone.

Waters support for alternative economic thinking has produced eye catching headlines, after his comments in June 2019 that stated the Government has "pretended we know what we're doing on the economy" for 20 years. His speech stated that "all the orthodox tools we can think of at growing the economy in the conventional way" have only produced static GDP over 20 years across the UK. Plaid Cymru stated the comments were "remarkable", while the Welsh Conservatives described them as "deeply concerning", however the First Minister Mark Drakeford defended Waters by saying he was right to reject the old ways of thinking especially as Wales faces "the global shifts of increased mechanisation, automation and of course, Brexit."

=== Welsh independence ===
Waters opposes Welsh independence, but has said that his party has dismissed independence supporters as "separatists" for too long. During an appearance on the Hiraeth podcast, he said:

"I think there's a real challenge for the Labour Party to properly engage with this, and for too long that too many people in the party have dismissed independence as about separatism, as if this kind of gets you off the hook from intellectual engagement with the issue. You just call them separatists and therefore suddenly you’re off the hook from engaging with the issues and I just think that won't wash anymore."

== Personal life ==
He has two children and resides in the Penarth area, with a house in Llanelli. He is a member of the GMB Union.

Senedd
Preceded by Keith Davies	Member of the Senedd for Llanelli; 2016 – 2026	Succeeded by seat abolished
Preceded by Ken Skates	Deputy Minister for Climate Change; 2021 – present	Incumbent
