= 1995 Welsh local elections =

- 4 May 1995

All 1,272 seats to 22 Welsh councils
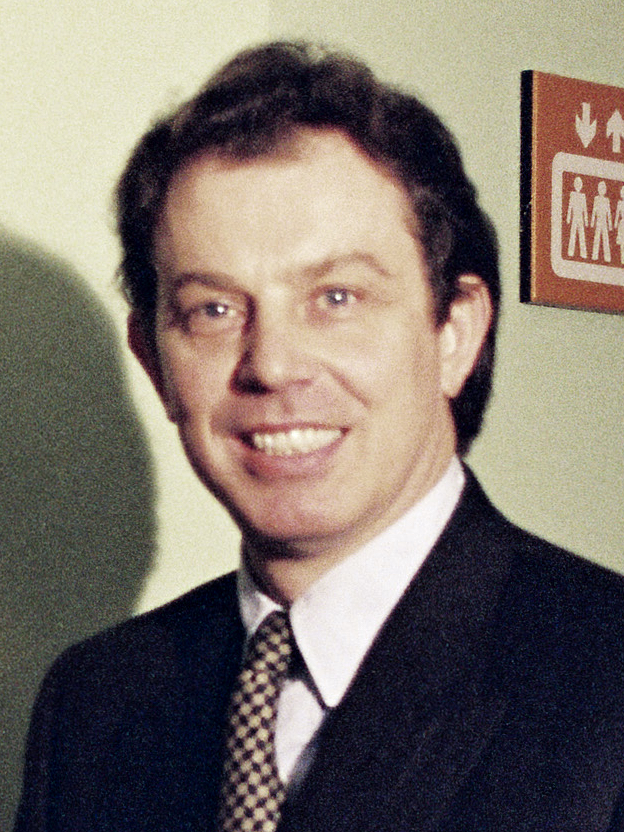

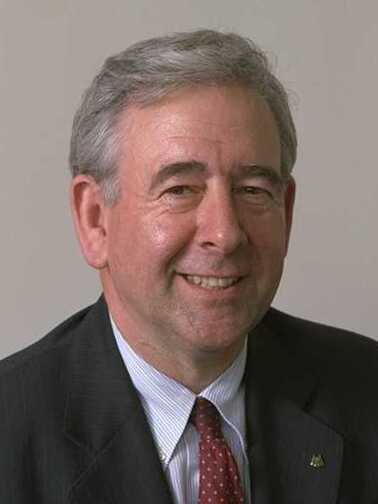

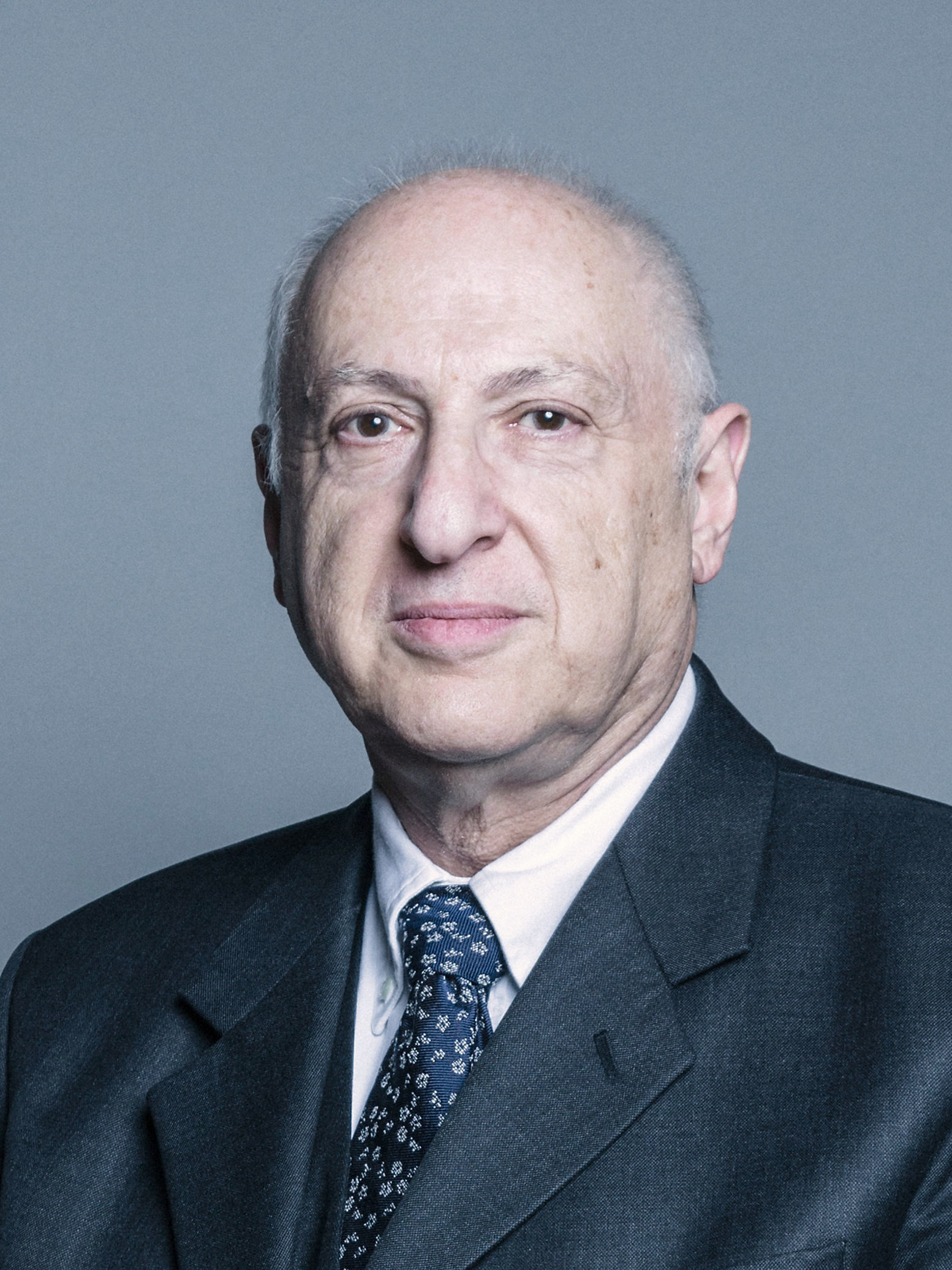

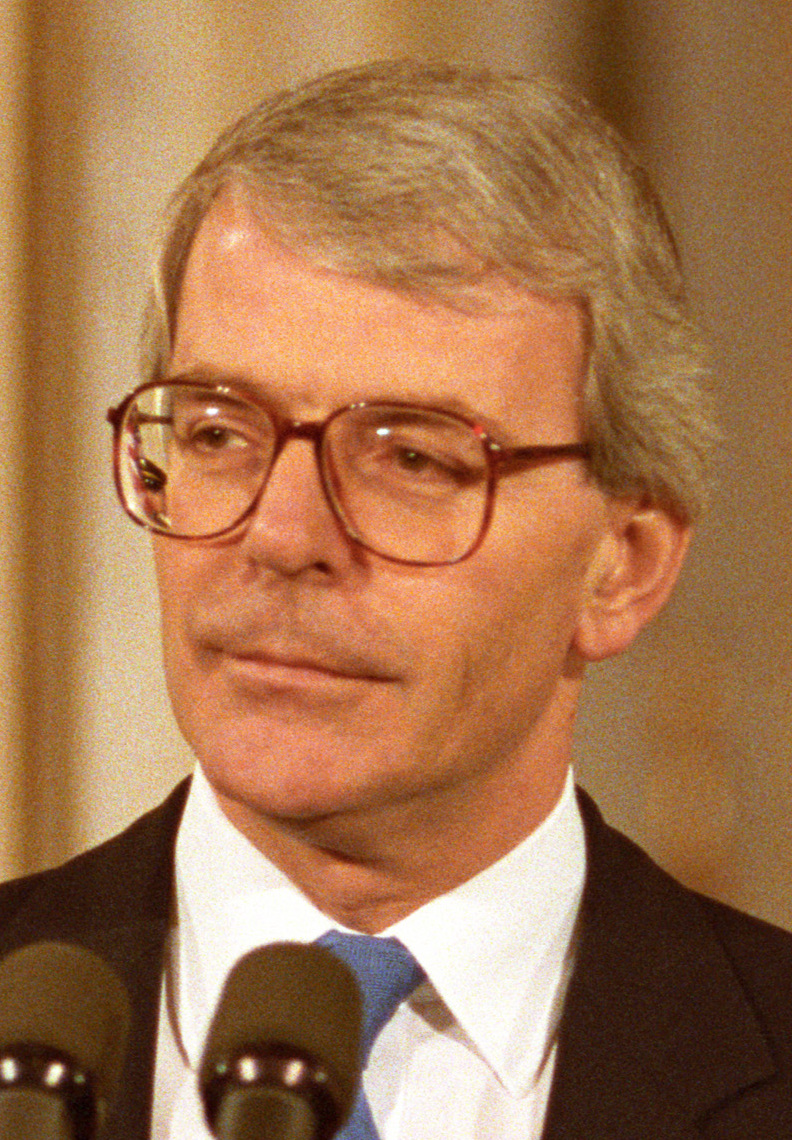
	First party	Second party
Leader	Tony Blair	Dafydd Wigley
Party	Labour	Plaid Cymru
Leader since	21 July 1994	24 September 1991
Seats won	726	113
Popular vote	404,013	115,900
Popular vote (%)	43.6%	12.5%
	Third party	Fourth party
Leader	Alex Carlile	John Major
Party	Liberal Democrats	Conservative
Leader since	1992	27 November 1990
Seats won	79	42
Popular vote	95,376	75,448
Popular vote (%)	10.2%	8.1%

Local elections in Wales were held on 4 May 1995 to elect members to the twenty-two newly created local authorities. They were held alongside other local elections in the United Kingdom. The previous elections were held in 1993.

== Wales-wide Results ==
Party	Votes	%	+/-	Councils	+/-	Seats	+/-
Labour	404,013	43.6%		14		726	
Independent	188,352	20.3%		4		292	
Plaid Cymru	115,900	12.5%		1		113	
Liberal Democrats	95,376	10.2%		0		79	
Conservative	75,448	8.1%		0		42	
Green	10,161	1.1%		0		0	
Other	36,966	4.0%		0		20	
No overall control	n/a	n/a	n/a	3		n/a	n/a

== Result ==
In all 22 Welsh councils the whole of the council was up for election.

Council	Previous control	Result	Details
Aberconwy and Colwyn†	New Council	No overall control	Details
Anglesey†	New Council	Independent	Details
Blaenau Gwent	New Council	Labour	Details
Bridgend	New Council	Labour	Details
Caernarfonshire and Merionethshire†	New Council	Plaid Cymru	Details
Caerphilly	New Council	Labour	Details
Cardiff	New Council	Labour	Details
Cardiganshire†	New Council	Independent	Details
Carmarthenshire	New Council	No overall control	Details
Denbighshire	New Council	No overall control	Details
Flintshire	New Council	Labour	Details
Merthyr Tydfil	New Council	Labour	Details
Monmouthshire	New Council	Labour	Details
Neath and Port Talbot†	New Council	Labour	Details
Newport	New Council	Labour	Details
Pembrokeshire	New Council	Independent	Details
Powys	New Council	Independent	Details
Rhondda Cynon Taf	New Council	Labour	Details
Swansea	New Council	Labour	Details
Torfaen	New Council	Labour	Details
Vale of Glamorgan	New Council	Labour	Details
Wrexham	New Council	Labour	Details

†Council was renamed shortly after election.
