= 2004 Welsh local elections =

- 10 June 2004

All 1,263 seats to 22 Welsh councils
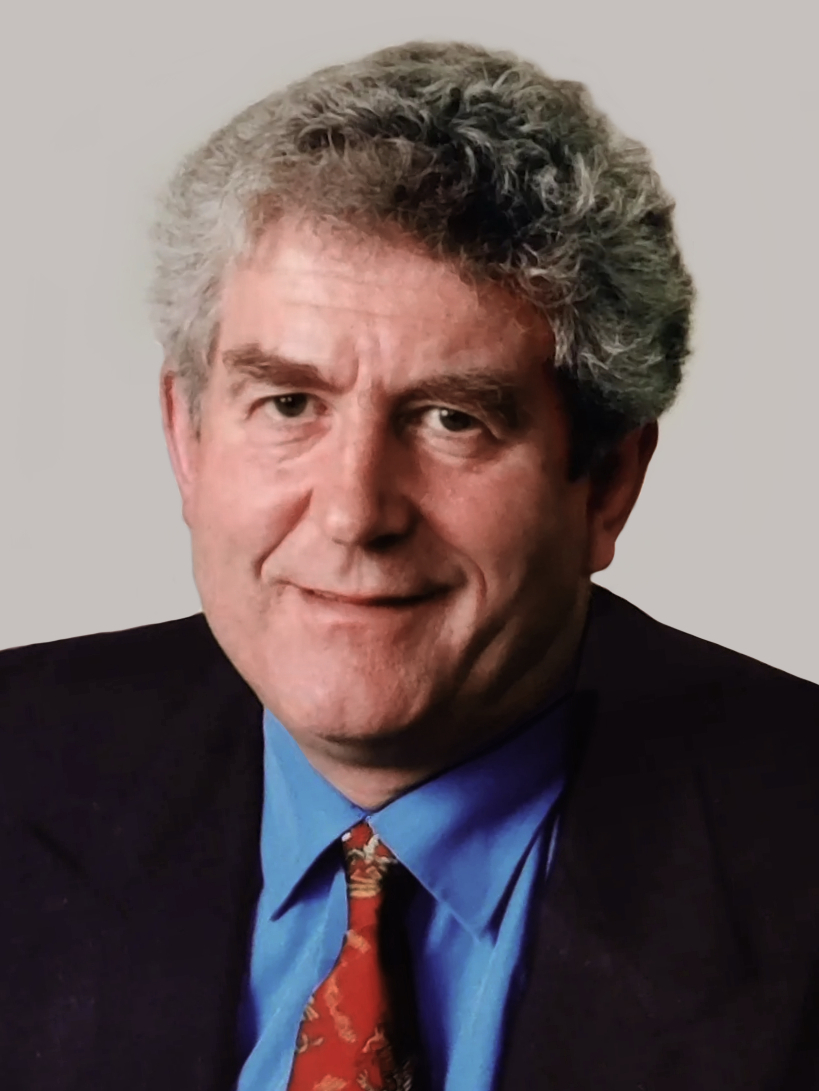

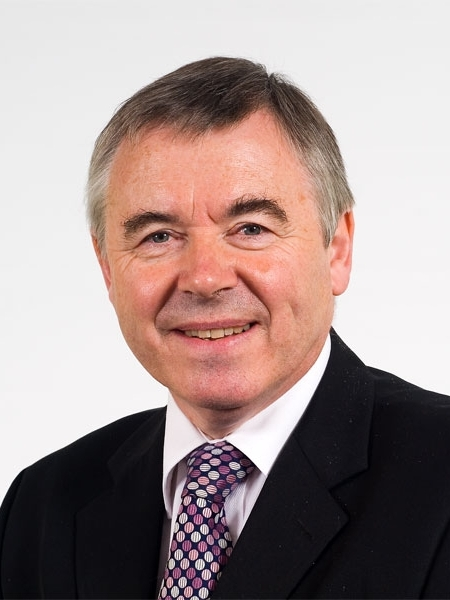

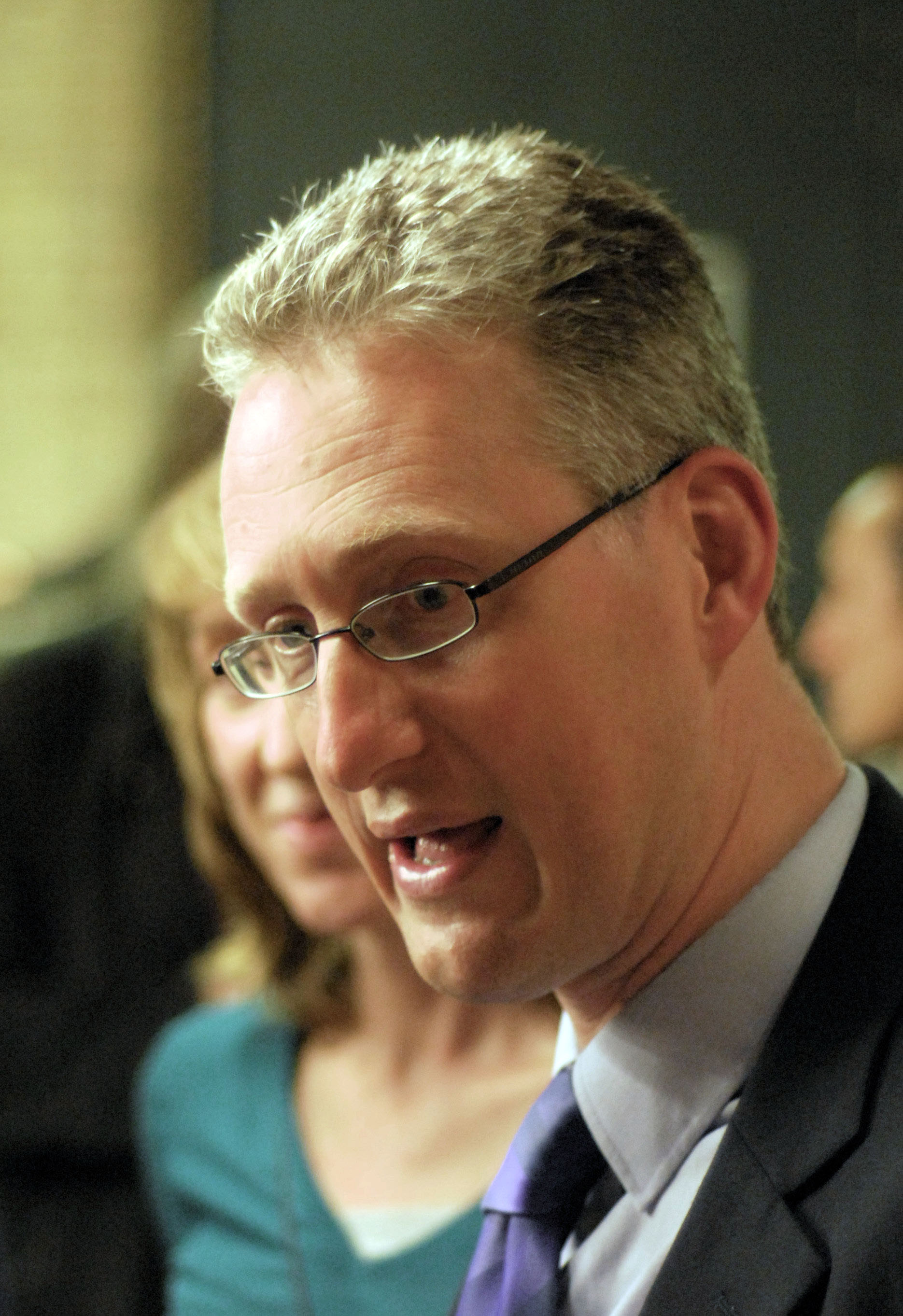

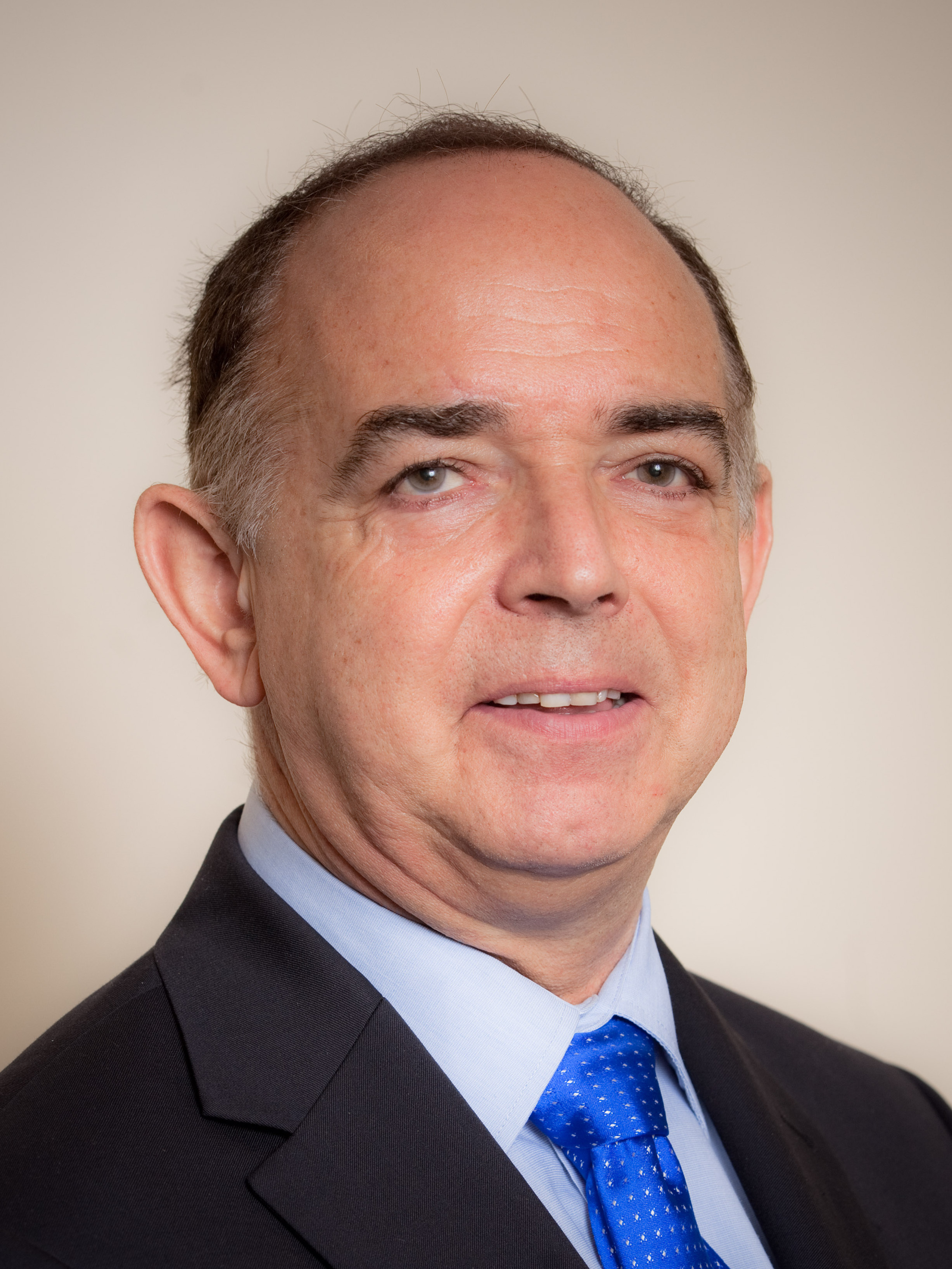
	First party	Second party
Leader	Rhodri Morgan	Ieuan Wyn Jones
Party	Labour	Plaid Cymru
Leader since	11 February 2000	3 August 2000
Seats won	479	175
Seat change	▼84	▼30
Popular vote	278,193	149,352
Popular vote (%)	30.6%	16.4%
Swing (pp)	▼3.8%	▼1.8%
	Third party	Fourth party
Leader	Lembit Opik	Nick Bourne
Party	Liberal Democrats	Conservative
Leader since	17 September 2001	18 August 1999
Seats won	146	107
Seat change	▲48	▲32
Popular vote	126,135	99,991
Popular vote (%)	13.9%	11.0%
Swing (pp)	▲0.5%	▲0.9%
- Colours denote the winning party with outright control (left), and the largest party by ward (right)

Local elections in Wales were held on 10 June 2004 to elect members to the twenty-two local authorities. They were held alongside other local elections in the United Kingdom. The previous elections were held in 1999.

The elections were originally scheduled for May 2003, but were delayed to avoid a conflict with the 2003 Wales Assembly elections. However, this meant they took place on the same day as the 2004 elections to the European Parliament. 3,135 candidates competed for 1,262 council seats across Wales, in 879 electoral wards.

== Results ==
Party	Votes	%	+/-	Councils	+/-	Seats	+/-
Labour	278,193	30.6%	▼3.8	8	Steady	479	▼84
Independent	205,722	22.6%	▲3.5	3	▼1	321	▲26
Plaid Cymru	149,352	16.4%	▼1.8	1	▼2	175	▼30
Liberal Democrats	126,135	13.9%	▲0.5	0	Steady	146	▲48
Conservative	99,991	11.0%	▲0.9	1	▲1	107	▲32
Green	10,799	1.2%	▲0.4	0	Steady	0	▼1
Other	39,492	4.3%	▲0.5	0	Steady	35	▲2
No overall control	n/a	n/a	n/a	9	▲2	n/a	n/a

== Councils ==
In all 22 Welsh councils the whole of the council was up for election.

Council	Previous control	Result	Details
Anglesey	Independent	Independent hold	Details
Blaenau Gwent	Labour	Labour hold	Details
Bridgend	Labour	No overall control gain	Details
Caerphilly	Plaid Cymru	Labour gain	Details
Cardiff	Labour	No overall control gain	Details
Carmarthenshire	No overall control	No overall control hold	Details
Ceredigion	Independent	No overall control gain	Details
Conwy	No overall control	No overall control hold	Details
Denbighshire	No overall control	No overall control hold	Details
Flintshire	Labour	Labour hold	Details
Gwynedd	Plaid Cymru	Plaid Cymru	Details
Merthyr Tydfil	No overall control	Labour gain	Details
Monmouthshire	No overall control	Conservative gain	Details
Neath Port Talbot	Labour	Labour hold	Details
Newport	Labour	Labour hold	Details
Pembrokeshire	Independent	Independent hold	Details
Powys	Independent	Independent hold	Details
Rhondda Cynon Taff	Plaid Cymru	Labour gain	Details
Swansea	Labour	No overall control gain	Details
Torfaen	Labour	Labour hold	Details
Vale of Glamorgan	No overall control	No overall control hold	Details
Wrexham	No overall control	No overall control hold	Details
