= 1999 Welsh local elections =

- 6 May 1999

All 1,270 seats to 22 Welsh councils
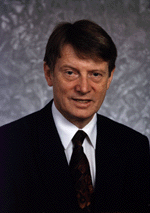

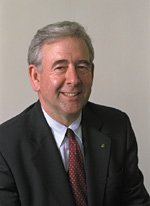

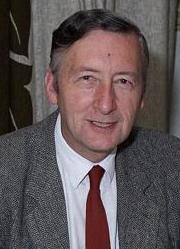

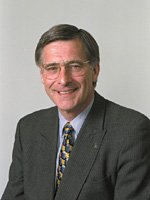
	First party	Second party
Leader	Alun Michael	Dafydd Wigley
Party	Labour	Plaid Cymru
Leader since	20 February 1999	24 September 1991
Seats won	563	205
Seat change	▼163	▲92
Popular vote	338,470	179,212
Popular vote (%)	34.4%	18.2%
Swing (pp)	▼9.2%	▲5.7%
	Third party	Fourth party
Leader	Richard Livsey	Rod Richards
Party	Liberal Democrats	Conservative
Leader since	1997	10 November 1998
Seats won	98	75
Seat change	▲19	▲33
Popular vote	132,091	99,565
Popular vote (%)	13.4%	10.1%
Swing (pp)	▲3.2%	▲2.0%

Local elections in Wales were held on 6 May 1999 to elect members to the twenty-two local authorities. They were held alongside other local elections in the United Kingdom. The previous elections were held in 1995. The inaugural election to the National Assembly for Wales took place on the same day as well.

== Wales-Wide Results ==
Party	Votes	%	+/-	Councils	+/-	Seats	+/-
Labour	338,470	34.4%	▼9.2%	8	▼6	563	▼163
Independent	187,345	19.1%	▼1.2%	3	▼1	295	▲3
Plaid Cymru	179,212	18.2%	▲5.7%	3	▲2	205	▲92
Liberal Democrats	132,091	13.4%	▲3.2%	0	Steady	98	▲19
Conservative	99,565	10.1%	▲2.0%	0	Steady	75	▲33
Green	8,328	0.8%	▼0.3%	0	Steady	1	▲1
Other	37,788	3.8%	▼0.2%	0	Steady	33	▲13
No overall control	n/a	n/a	n/a	8	▲5	n/a	n/a

== Results by authority ==
In all 22 Welsh councils the whole of the council was up for election.

Council	Previous control	Result	Details
Blaenau Gwent	Labour	Labour hold	Details
Bridgend	Labour	Labour hold	Details
Caerphilly	Labour	Plaid Cymru gain	Details
Cardiff	Labour	Labour hold	Details
Carmarthenshire	No overall control	No overall control hold	Details
Ceredigion	Independent	No overall control gain	Details
Conwy	No overall control	No overall control hold	Details
Denbighshire	No overall control	No overall control hold	Details
Flintshire	Labour	Labour hold	Details
Gwynedd	Plaid Cymru	Plaid Cymru hold	Details
Isle of Anglesey	Independent	Independent hold	Details
Merthyr Tydfil	Labour	No overall control gain	Details
Monmouthshire	Labour	No overall control gain	Details
Neath Port Talbot	Labour	Labour hold	Details
Newport	Labour	Labour hold	Details
Pembrokeshire	Independent	Independent hold	Details
Powys	Independent	Independent hold	Details
Rhondda Cynon Taf	Labour	Plaid Cymru gain	Details
Swansea	Labour	Labour hold	Details
Torfaen	Labour	Labour hold	Details
Vale of Glamorgan	Labour	No overall control gain	Details
Wrexham	Labour	No overall control gain	Details
