= Gwynedd Council elections =

Local elections in Wales

Gwynedd Council in North Wales is elected, as a whole, every 4 years. In 2014 the National Assembly for Wales deferred all local elections in Wales to 2017. The council is composed of 74 councillors.

== Political control ==
Since 1999, political control has been held by the following parties:

| Party in control | Years |
|---|---|
| Plaid Cymru | 1995 - 2008 |
| No overall control | 2008 - 2011 |
| Plaid Cymru | 2011 - 2012 |
| No overall control | 2012 - 2015 |
| Plaid Cymru | 2015–present |

== Council elections ==
- 1995 Gwynedd Council election
- 1999 Gwynedd Council election
- 2004 Gwynedd Council election
- 2008 Gwynedd Council election
- 2012 Gwynedd Council election
- 2017 Gwynedd Council election
- 2022 Gwynedd Council election

== Results maps ==
2004 results map

2008 results map

2012 results map

2017 results map

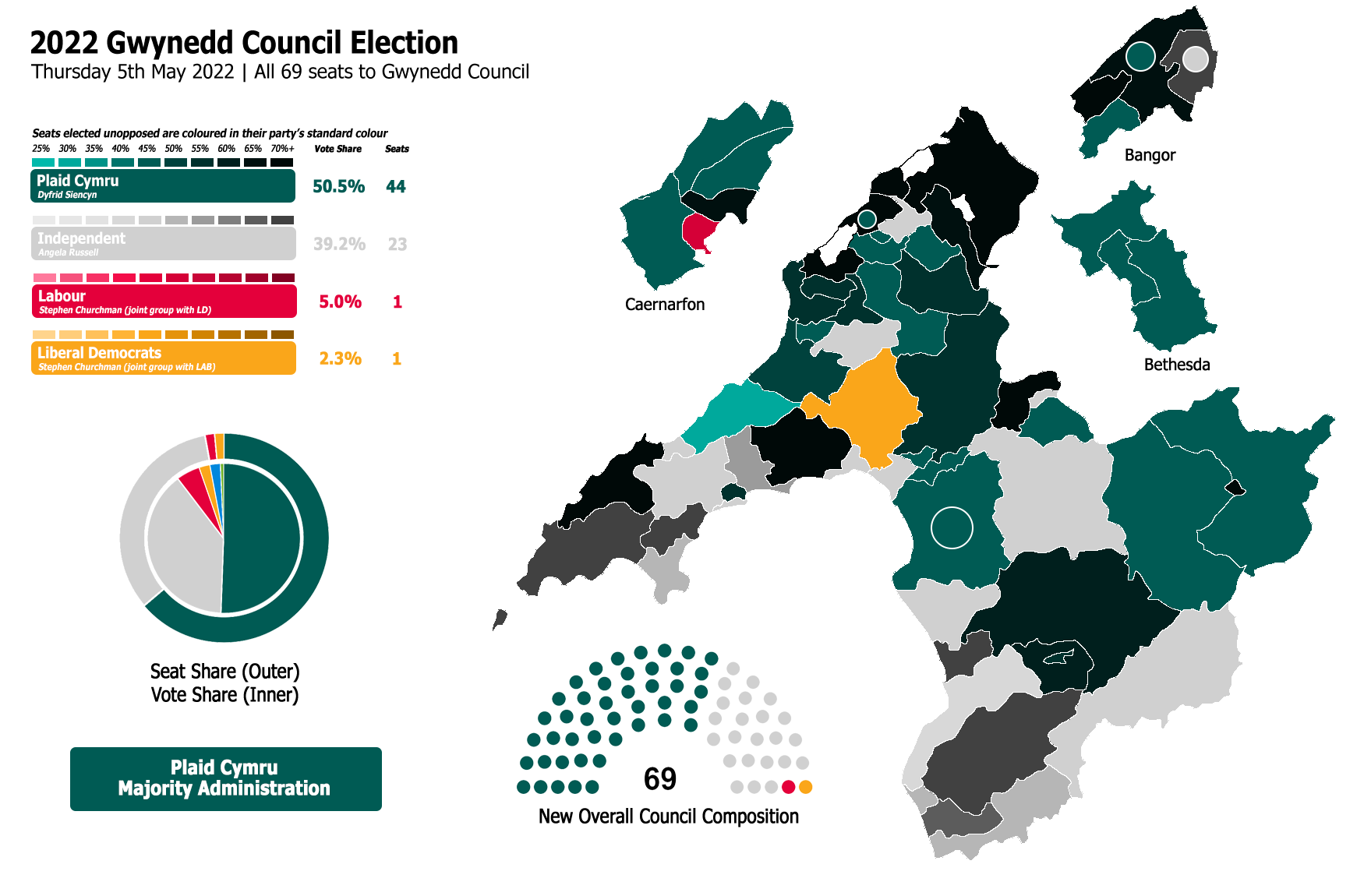
2022 results map

== By-election results ==
=== 2012 ===
Bryncrug / Llanfihangel by-election 14 June 2012
| Party | Candidate | Votes | % | ±% |
|---|---|---|---|---|
| Independent | Beth Lawton | 212 | 42.4 | N/A |
| Plaid Cymru | Alun Wyn Evans | 136 | 27.2 | N/A |
| Independent | John Pughe | 66 | 13.2 | N/A |
| Independent | Nancy Elizabeth Clarke | 51 | 10.2 | N/A |
| Llais Gwynedd | Jason Parry | 35 | 7.0 | N/A |
| Independent | Maria Sarnacki | 94 | 13.8 | N/A |
| Majority | | 76 | 15.2 | |
| Turnout | | | | |
| Independent hold | | Swing | | |

This election was scheduled to take place as part of the 2012 Gwynedd Council election but was delayed as no candidates were nominated for the seat vacated by retirement of Independent Councillor Arwel Pierce.

=== 2015 ===
Cadnant by-election 2 April 2015
| Party | Candidate | Votes | % | ±% |
|---|---|---|---|---|
| Labour | Glyn Thomas | 233 | 34.2 | ▼6.1 |
| Plaid Cymru | Glyn Tomos | 185 | 27.1 | ▼32.6 |
| Llais Gwynedd | Jason Parry | 148 | 21.7 | N/A |
| Independent | Maria Sarnacki | 94 | 13.8 | N/A |
| Conservative | David Hibbert | 22 | 3.2 | N/A |
| Majority | | 48 | 7.1 | |
| Turnout | | | | |
| Labour gain from Plaid Cymru | | Swing | | |

Morfa Nefyn 9 July 2015
| Party | Candidate | Votes | % | ±% |
|---|---|---|---|---|
| Plaid Cymru | Sian Wyn Hughes | 315 | 71.9 | ▼5.5 |
| Llais Gwynedd | Winifred Jones-Lewis | 123 | 28.1 | ▲5.5 |
| Majority | | 192 | 43.8 | |
| Turnout | | | | |
| Plaid Cymru hold | | Swing | | |

Llanaelhaearn by-election 19 November 2015
| Party | Candidate | Votes | % | ±% |
|---|---|---|---|---|
| Plaid Cymru | Aled Wyn Jones | 200 | 48.7 | ▲36.7 |
| Llais Gwynedd | Wynne Thomas Isaac | 112 | 27.3 | ▼22.6 |
| Independent | Eric Cullen | 99 | 24.1 | N/A |
| Majority | | 88 | 21.4 | |
| Turnout | | | | |
| Plaid Cymru gain from Llais Gwynedd | | Swing | | |

Dewi by-election 19 November 2015
| Party | Candidate | Votes | % | ±% |
|---|---|---|---|---|
| Plaid Cymru | Gareth Roberts | 189 | 59.4 | ▲2.1 |
| Labour | Eirian Roberts | 110 | 34.6 | ▼0.2 |
| Liberal Democrats | Andrew Joyce | 19 | 5.9 | ▼1.9 |
| Majority | | 79 | 24.8 | |
| Turnout | | | | |
| Plaid Cymru hold | | Swing | | |

Pwllheli South by-election 26 November 2015
| Party | Candidate | Votes | % | ±% |
|---|---|---|---|---|
| | Hefin Underwood | 269 | 45.4 | N/A |
| Plaid Cymru | Alan Williams | 168 | 28.4 | ▼11.9 |
| Independent | Micheal Parry | 106 | 17.9 | N/A |
| Llais Gwynedd | Peta Merrian Pollitt | 49 | 8.3 | ▼51.5 |
| Majority | | 101 | 17.0 | |
| Turnout | | | | |
| Independent gain from Llais Gwynedd | | Swing | | |

=== 2016 ===
Marchog by-election 14 July 2016
| Party | Candidate | Votes | % | ±% |
|---|---|---|---|---|
| | Dylan Fernley | 211 | 65.3 | N/A |
| Labour | Luke Tugwell | 112 | 34.7 | ▼2.7 |
| Majority | | 99 | 30.6 | |
| Turnout | | | | |
| Independent hold | | Swing | | |

The Marchog by-election was triggered by the resignation of Councillor Chris O'Neal, an Independent, after he'd admitted assaulting a taxi-driver.

Y Felinheli by-election 14 July 2016
| Party | Candidate | Votes | % | ±% |
|---|---|---|---|---|
| Plaid Cymru | Gareth Wyn Griffith | 614 | 92.6 | N/A |
| Conservative | Andrew Kinsman | 49 | 7.4 | N/A |
| Majority | | 565 | 85.2 | |
| Turnout | | | | |
| Plaid Cymru hold | | Swing | | |

The by-election was triggered by the resignation of Councillor Siân Gwenllian of Plaid Cymru after her election to the Welsh Assembly as Member for Arfon.

Waunfawr by-election 21 July 2016
| Party | Candidate | Votes | % | ±% |
|---|---|---|---|---|
| Plaid Cymru | Edgar Wyn Owen | 358 | 75.8 | ▲18.6 |
| Labour | Paul Thomas Scott | 114 | 24.2 | N/A |
| Majority | | 244 | 51.6 | |
| Turnout | | | | |
| Plaid Cymru hold | | Swing | | |

The by-election was triggered by the resignation of Councillor Eurig Wyn of Plaid Cymru.

== See also ==
- List of electoral wards in Gwynedd
