= 1991 Welsh local elections =

- 2 May 1991

All 1367 seats to 37 Welsh district councils
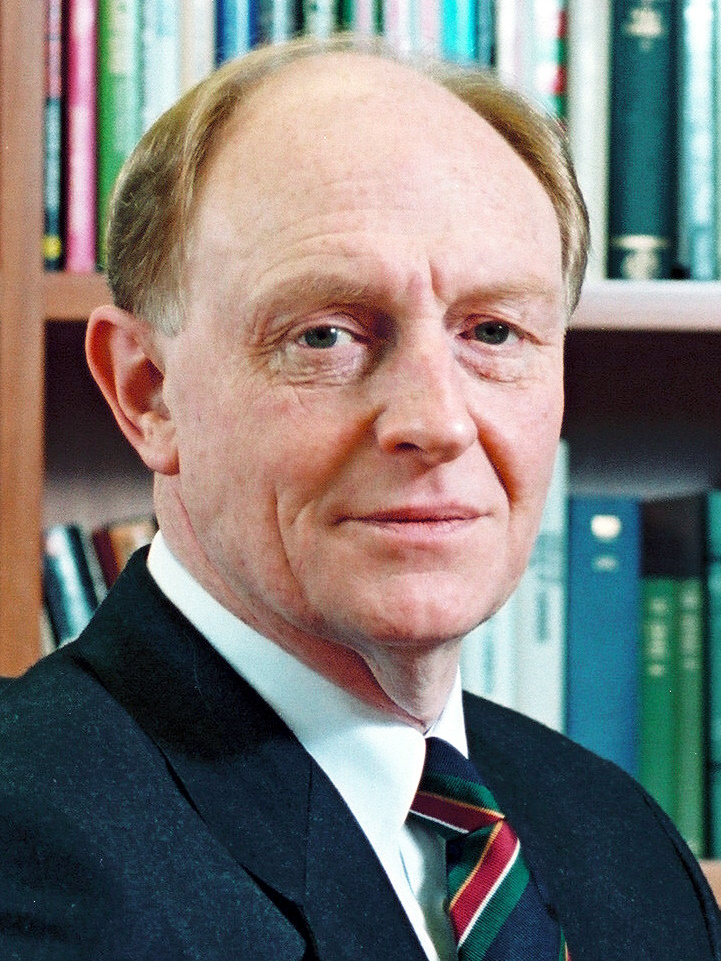

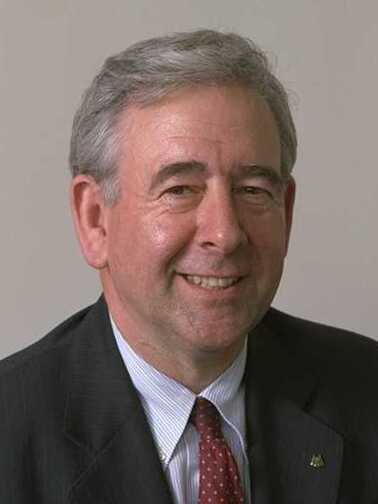

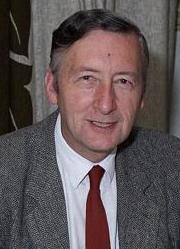

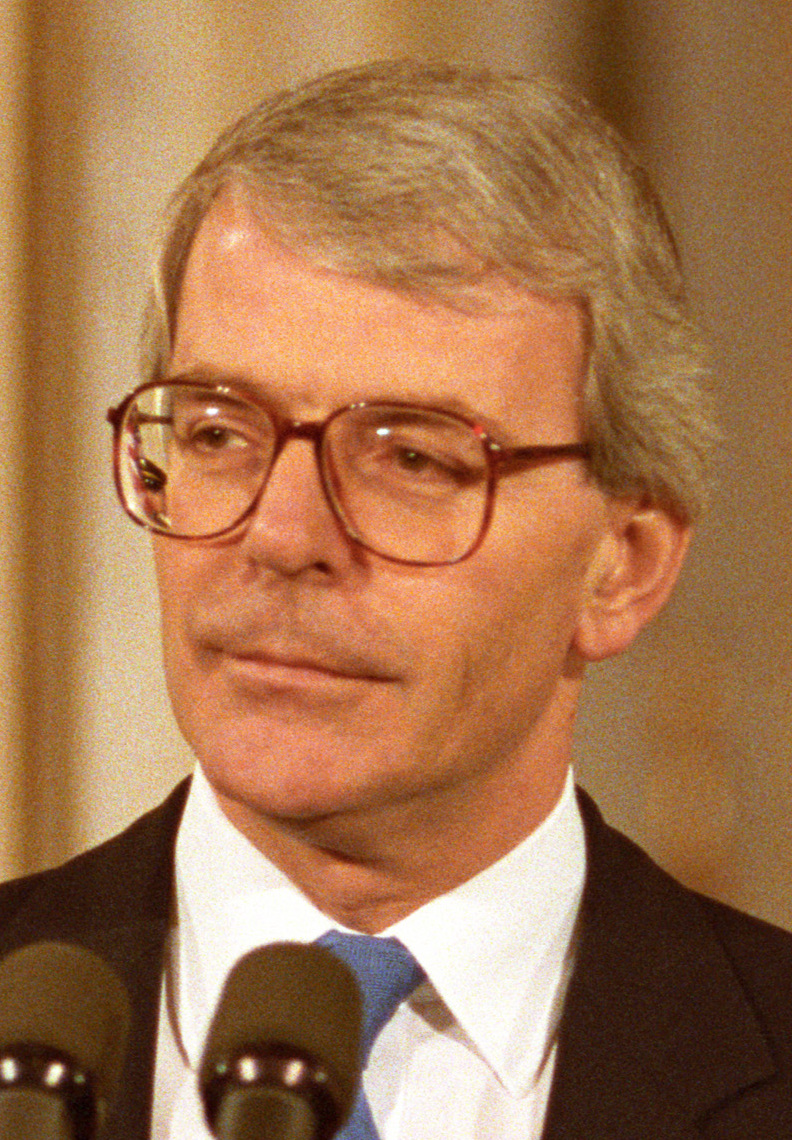
	First party	Second party
Leader	Neil Kinnock	Dafydd Wigley
Party	Labour	Plaid Cymru
Leader since	2 October 1983	24 September 1991
Seats won	570	112
Popular vote	315,521	96,908
Popular vote (%)	35.0%	10.7%
	Third party	Fourth party
Leader	Richard Livsey	John Major
Party	Liberal Democrats	Conservative
Leader since	1988	28 November 1990
Seats won	75	104
Popular vote	78,647	112,346
Popular vote (%)	8.7%	12.5%

Local elections in Wales were held on 2 May 1991 to elect members to the 37 district councils. They were held alongside other local elections in the United Kingdom. The previous elections to the upper-tier counties were held in 1989, while the previous election to the second-level districts were held in 1987.

== Wales-wide results ==
Party	Votes	%	+/-	Councils	+/-	Seats	+/-
Labour	315,521	35.0		17	▲1	570	
Plaid Cymru	96,908	10.7		0		112	
Liberal Democrats	78,647	8.7		0		34	
Conservative	112,346	12.5		0		104	
Green	10,804	1.7		0		2	
Independents & Other	217,743	24.2		13	▲1	457	
No overall control	n/a	n/a	n/a	7	▲4	n/a	n/a
