= Alice Hooker-Stroud =

Welsh politician and climate activist

Leader of the Wales Green Party
- In office 2015–2017
- Preceded by: Pippa Bartolotti
- Succeeded by: Grenville Ham

Personal details
- Born: April 1984 (age 42)
- Party: Wales Green Party

Alice Hooker-Stroud (born April 1984) is a Welsh politician and climate activist. She was elected as the leader of the Wales Green Party in 2015. In 2016 she stood as the Green Party candidate for Mid and West Wales during the National Assembly for Wales Elections in 2016.

== Education and early work ==
Hooker-Stroud was born and raised in Machynlleth, Mid-Wales. She is multilingual and can speak English, Welsh, and Spanish. She holds an Undergraduate and Master’s degree in Earth System (Climate) Science and Physics. She went on to work as a scientific technician at Catalan Institute of Climate Sciences in Spain. Later, she moved back to Wales to work as a research and communications officer for the Centre for Alternative Technology. During her time at the centre, she worked on the Zero Carbon Britain project. Between 2013–2016 she was the co-director of This is Rubbish, a charity that works on reducing industry food wastage in the UK.

== Political career ==
Hooker-Stroud was elected as the leader of the Green Party in Wales in 2015. Aged 31, she was the youngest person to be elected leader of any political party in the UK. She claimed she got involved in politics after seeing cutbacks and neglect of Welsh communities.

She pushed for the Green Party to win their first Welsh seats in the 2016 National Assembly for Wales elections. In April 2016 she launched the party manifesto at Chapter Arts Centre, Cardiff. During the elections she stood as the Green Party candidate for Mid and West Wales, but not elected. In December 2016 she was re-elected as the party leader.

At the end March 2017 Hooker-Stroud resigned from her role as the leader of the Welsh Green Party. She said she was unable to stay in the role as it was effectively a voluntary position due to lack of funding within the party. In her resignation, she called for urgent reform of political party financing in the UK to encourage alternative voices to be heard.
