= 1993 Welsh local elections =

Elections

- 6 May 1993

All 502 seats to 8 Welsh county councils
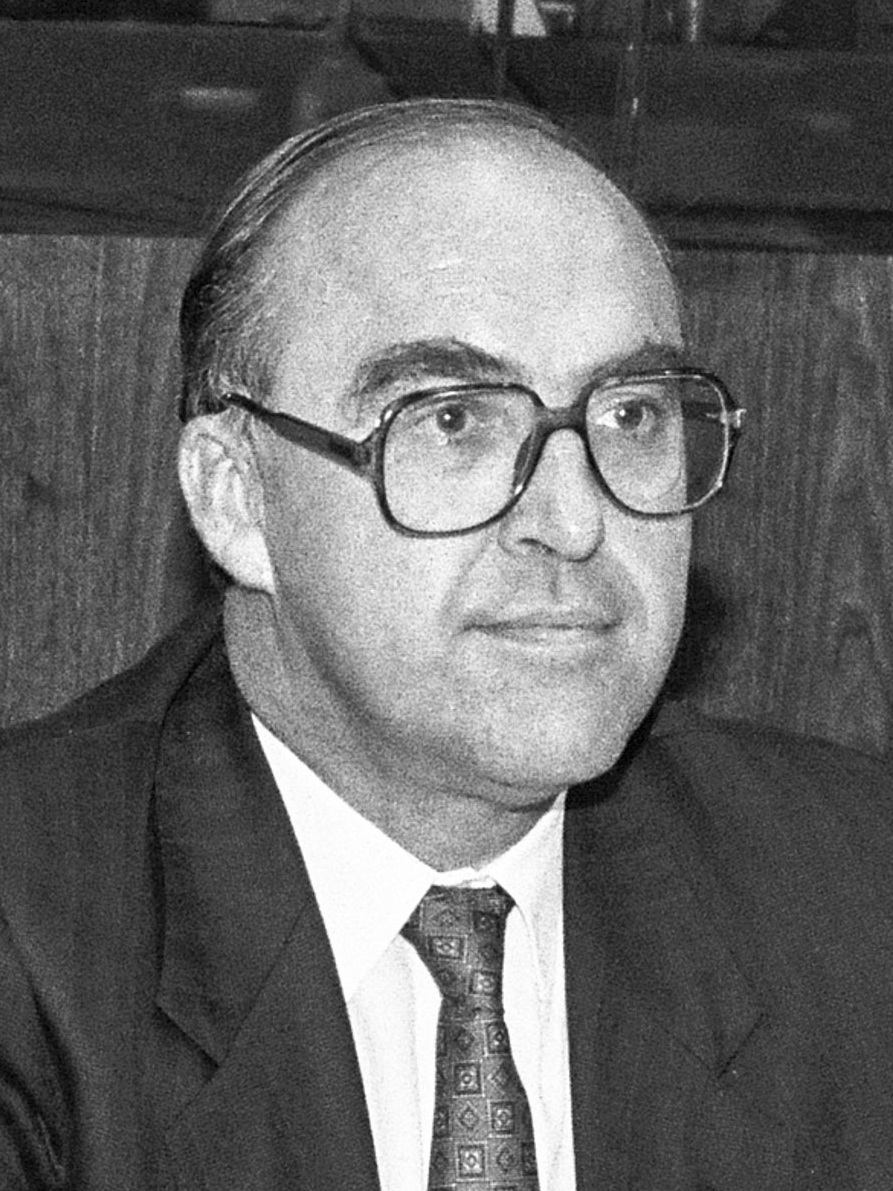

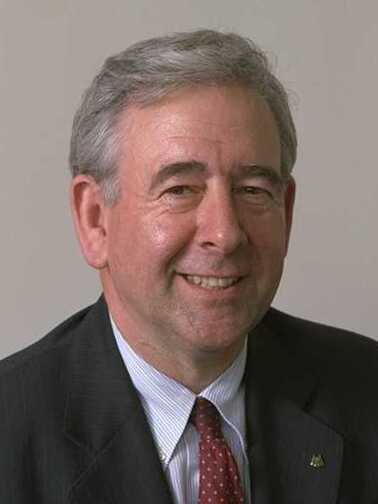

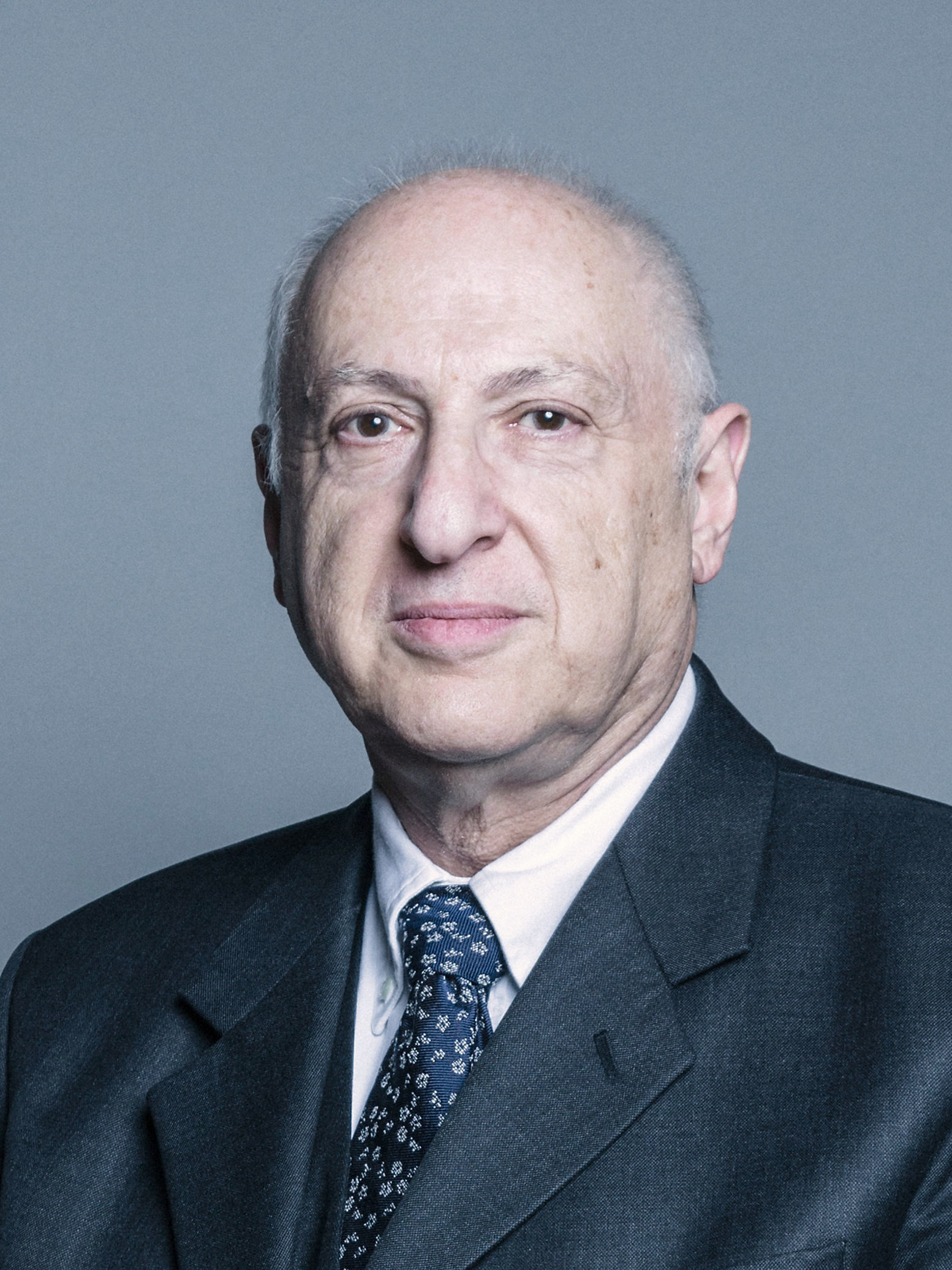

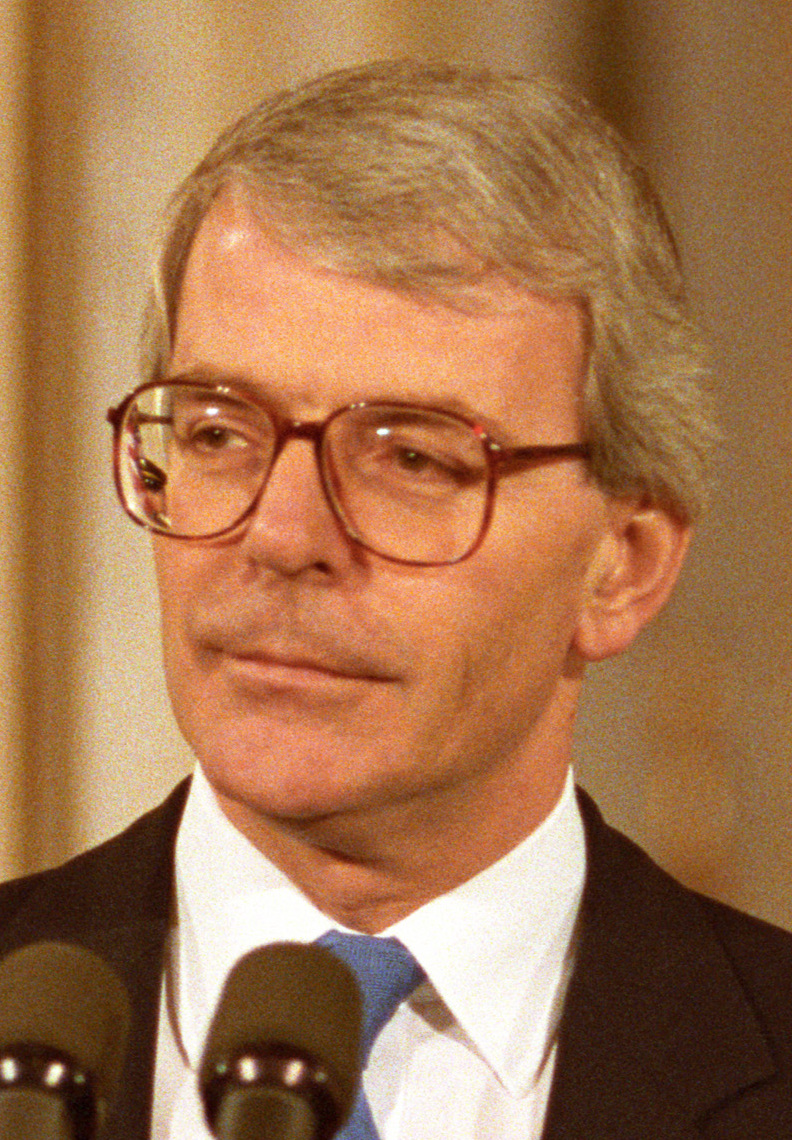
	First party	Second party
Leader	John Smith	Dafydd Wigley
Party	Labour	Plaid Cymru
Leader since	18 July 1992	24 September 1991
Seats won	272	41
Popular vote	319,504	89,930
Popular vote (%)	47.1%	13.3%
	Third party	Fourth party
Leader	Alex Carlile	John Major
Party	Liberal Democrats	Conservative
Leader since	1992	27 November 1990
Seats won	34	32
Popular vote	73,700	84,909
Popular vote (%)	10.9%	12.5%

Local elections in Wales were held on 6 May 1993 to elect members to the eight county councils. They were held alongside other local elections in the United Kingdom. The previous elections to the second-level districts of the counties were held in 1991, while the previous election to the counties were held in 1989.

== Wales-Wide Results ==
Party	Votes	%	+/-	Councils	+/-	Seats	+/-
Labour	319,504	47.1		5	Steady	272	
Plaid Cymru	89,930	13.3		0		41	
Liberal Democrats	73,700	10.9		0		34	
Conservative	84,909	12.5		0		32	
Green	4,078	0.6		0		1	
Independents & Other	106,082	13.3		1	▼1	122	
No overall control	n/a	n/a	n/a	2	▲1	n/a	n/a

== Result ==
In all 8 Welsh county councils the whole of the council was up for election.

Council	Previous control	Result	Details
Clwyd	Labour	Labour hold	Details
Dyfed	No overall control	No overall control hold	Details
Gwent	Labour	Labour hold	Details
Gwynedd	Independent	No overall control gain	Details
Mid Glamorgan	Labour	Labour hold	Details
Powys	Independent	Independent hold	Details
South Glamorgan	Labour	Labour hold	Details
West Glamorgan	Labour	Labour hold	Details
