= Elections in Wales =

There are four types of elections in Wales: elections to the House of Commons of the United Kingdom, elections to the devolved Senedd (Welsh Parliament; Welsh: Senedd Cymru), local elections to community councils and the 22 principal councils, and the police and crime commissioner elections. In addition there are by-elections for each aforementioned election. Elections are held on Election Day, which is conventionally a Thursday. Three of these four types of elections are held after fixed periods; the exception is UK general elections, the timing of which is at the discretion of the prime minister of the United Kingdom. Senedd elections may be postponed to avoid elections to the UK parliament and Senedd coinciding with each other.

== Electoral systems ==
The two electoral systems used for elections in Wales are first-past-the-post (for elections to the House of Commons, police and crime commissioner (PCC) elections and local elections), and the closed list variant of party-list proportional representation (for Senedd elections).

Under provision made by the Local Government and Elections (Wales) Act 2021, individual principal councils are able to choose the voting system used for their own elections, with the permitted choices being first-past-the-post and the single transferable vote (STV). As of 2026, all principal councils use first-past-the-post, and none has switched to STV.

If a principal council in Wales chose to switch to an elected mayor and cabinet executive under the Local Government Act 2000, the supplementary vote would be used for elections to that mayoralty.

From 2012 until 2023, PCC elections used the supplementary vote system; this was switched to first-past-the-post under provision made by the Elections Act 2022. The English Devolution and Community Empowerment Act 2026 makes provision that would, upon its commencement, switch the voting system for PCC elections back to the suplementary vote.

From 1999 until May 2026, the additional-member system was used for Senedd elections. This was replaced by the closed list as a result of the Senedd Cymru (Members and Elections) Act 2024.

== Local government elections ==
The results of the 2022 local elections, showing control party by council (left), and largest party by ward (right).

There are elections to 22 principal councils across Wales every five years, most recently on 5 May 2022. The largest principal councils in Wales are Cardiff, Newport and Swansea councils, which all lie in the southern coastal belt.

- The next Welsh local elections are scheduled for 2027
- Local election results 2022
- Local election results 2017
- Local election results 2012
- Local election results 2008
- Local election results 2004
- Local election results 1999
- Local election results 1995
- Local election results 1993

There are also elections to community councils every five years.

If a principal council in Wales chose to switch to an elected mayor and cabinet executive under the Local Government Act 2000, elections to that mayoralty would be held every five years. As of 2025, there are no such elected mayoralties in Wales; all Welsh principal councils use the leader and cabinet model of executive arrangements.

== Police and crime commissioner elections ==
Police and crime commissioners (PCCs) were established in England and Wales, replacing the local police authorities, following the Conservative–Liberal Democrat coalition agreement of 2010, with the first PCCs elected in 2012.

In November 2025, the UK government announced plans to abolish PCCs in 2028, upon the expiry of the terms of office of the PCCs elected in 2024. As a consequence, the scheduled 2028 PCC elections would be cancelled; the 2024 PCC elections will therefore likely be the last.

- 2024 England and Wales police and crime commissioner elections
- 2021 England and Wales police and crime commissioner elections
- 2016 England and Wales police and crime commissioner elections
- 2012 England and Wales police and crime commissioner elections

== Devolved parliament elections ==
There have been six elections to the devolved parliament of Wales, based in Cardiff Bay since 1999. These elections are held every five years to elect sixty Members of the Senedd (MSs; formerly Assembly Members, ASs). Voters have two votes: forty MSs are elected by the First Past the Post system in individual constituencies, and a further twenty MSs are elected by a regional top-up system in which voters vote by region. This system overall is called Additional Members System (AMS) and is a hybrid electoral system mixing both a plurality system (FPTP) and a proportional system (the party list system). The regions are: Mid and West Wales, North Wales, South Wales Central, South Wales East and South Wales West, whereas the constituencies are the same used for elections to the UK parliament. Each region elects four MSs, to achieve approximately proportional representation overall, with every individual in Wales being represented by five MSs in total, their local constituency MS and four regional MSs. Between its inception in 1999, it was known as the 'National Assembly for Wales'. Legislation was passed in 2020, for a name change on 6 May 2020 to its current name, 'Senedd Cymru' or the 'Welsh Parliament' (or simply 'Senedd') to fully reflect its constitutional status as a law-making and tax-setting parliament. It is based in Cardiff Bay, initially (as the Assembly) in Tŷ Hywel from 1999 to 2006, until it moved to the Senedd building, which opened on 1 March 2006, where the Assembly and now Senedd has been based since 2006. The elections were held every four years from 1999, but were increased to five years following the Wales Act 2014 for the 2016 election.

The 2021 Senedd election on 6 May 2021, was the first election to the devolved parliament since its name change. The election took place akin to previous elections when it was known as the National Assembly for Wales.

=== Election reform ===
The Richard Commission report of 2004 suggested an increase of the number of Members to 80. That number was also suggested, as a minimum, by the 2014 report of the Silk Commission. Similarly, in 2013 and 2016, the Electoral Reform Society published reports making the case for an upsize of the Assembly. A 2017 report of an expert commission suggested an increase to between 80 and 90 Members, switching to single transferable vote (STV) and enforcing gender quotas.

A reduction in the number of Welsh MPs has been proposed for the next UK general alection. Under the proposals, the number of MPs would be reduced from 40 to 32 and new constituency boundaries have also been proposed. The boundary plans were published on 19 October 2022 and voters have four weeks to comment. The map of the new constituency boundaries would also be used as Senedd regions for the next Senedd election.

The Special Committee was set up on 6 October 2021. In May 2022, a joint position statement was published by First Minister Mark Drakeford and Plaid Cymru Leader Adam Price, calling for a 96-Member Senedd, all elected through closed party list proportional representation (using the D'Hondt method) with mandatory "zipping" of male and female candidates in the list to ensure that for every party, half of the Members will be women.

The final report of the Special Committee was published on 30 May 2022 and recommended the system agreed to by the Labour and Plaid Cymru leaders.

==== Senedd Cymru (Members and Elections) Bill ====
In September 2023, the Welsh Government published its plans for electoral reform as part of the proposed Senedd Cymru (Members and Elections) Bill. The number of Senedd constituencies is set to fall to 16, with each constituency electing six MSs from a closed list under the D'Hondt method. Under the proposals, all candidates must live in Wales, and elections would take place every four years, rather than five.

=== as the Senedd ===
Elections to the institution prior to 2020, with the last being in 2016, were done under the previous name the 'National Assembly for Wales' (see below). Following legislation in 2020, any subsequent elections, from the 2021 Senedd election will be under its new name.

==== 2030 ====
The next Senedd election is expected to be held in 2030, under the provisions of the Senedd Cymru (Members and Elections) Act 2024 where Senedd terms are four-year terms since the previous election. Another boundary review of its constituencies is expected prior to the election.

==== 2026 ====
The 2026 Senedd election was held on Thursday 7 May 2026, under the provisions of the Wales Act 2014 where Senedd terms are five-year terms since the previous election. This date could have been be postponed under circumstances including public health or safety emergencies, or an early UK parliamentary election. However following the Senedd Cymru (Members and Elections) Act 2024, Senedd terms were reduced to four years after the 2026 election. A 2026 review of Senedd constituencies also took place prior to the election.

==== 2021 ====
It was the sixth general election since the establishment of the institution in 1999. It was held along with the other 2021 United Kingdom local elections and was the first election where 16 and 17-year-olds were allowed to vote in Wales, which is the largest extension of the franchise in Wales since 1969. Both changes were a result of the Senedd and Elections (Wales) Bill 2019.

Overall turnout: 46.5%

=== as the National Assembly for Wales (1999–2020) ===
Elections to the then 'National Assembly for Wales' (or Welsh Assembly') occurred from its first election in 1999 up until the 2016 election (with any subsequent elections being as the 'Senedd'). This follows the 1997 devolution referendum where Welsh voters narrowly approved the formation of the devolved institution. The institution is now known as the Senedd (Welsh Parliament; Welsh: Senedd Cymru) (see above).

==== 2016 ====
Overall turnout: 45.3%

==== 2011 ====
Overall turnout: 42.2%

==== 2007 ====
Overall turnout: 43.7%

==== 2003 ====
Overall turnout: 38.2%

==== 1999 ====
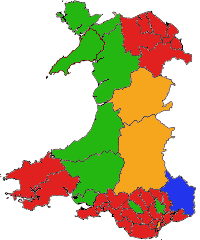
A map showing the constituency winners (left) and additional members by electoral region (right) of the election by their party colours.

Overall turnout: 46%

== UK parliament elections ==
Map of the 2024 election results in the new 32 constituencies.

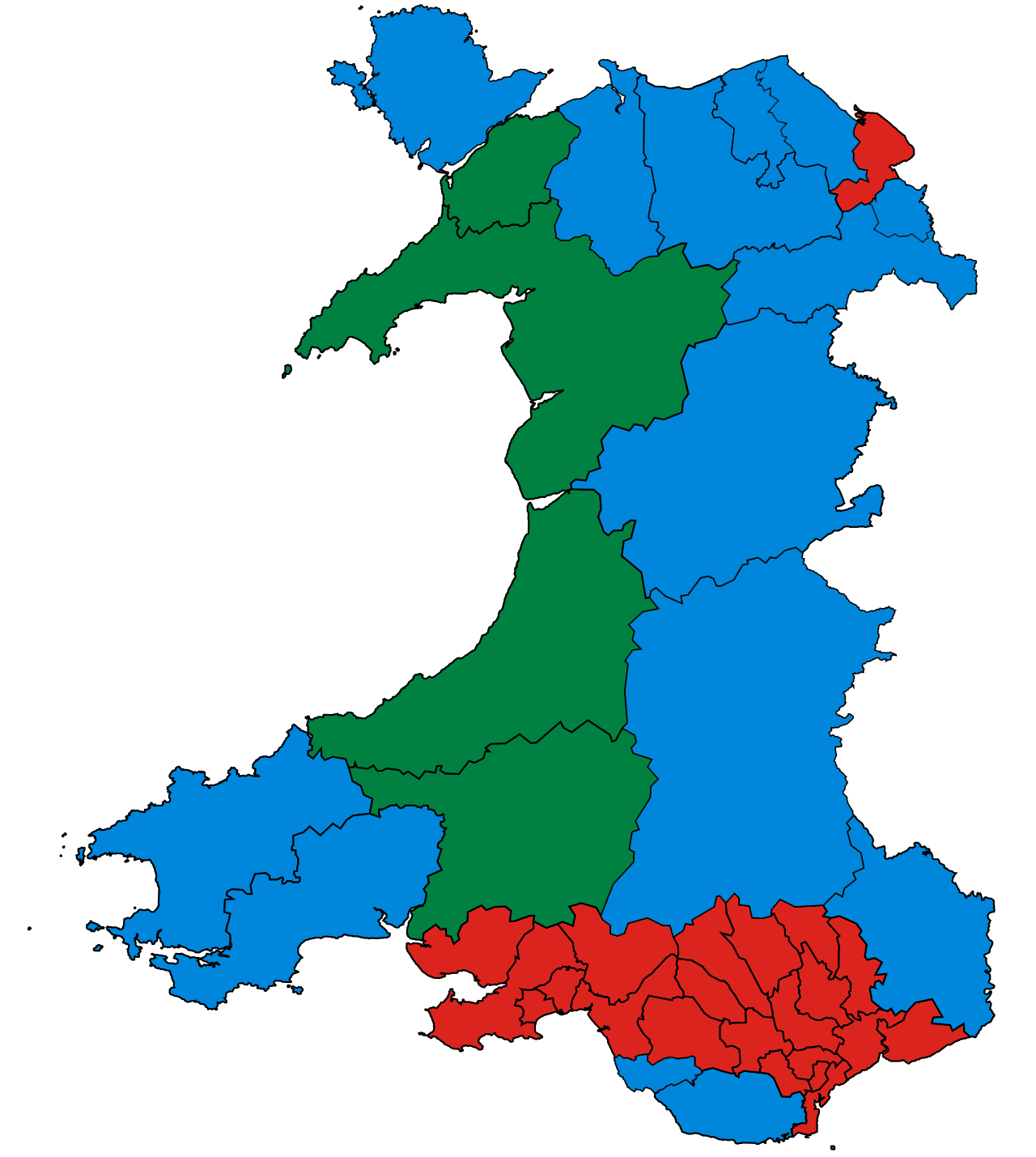
Map of the 2019 election results in the then 40 constituencies.

Wales has been eligible to send MPs to Westminster since the Laws in Wales Act 1535. Between then and 1885, most constituencies were categorised as county or borough constituencies; each sent one MP to Westminster. As the Industrial Revolution took hold there were many calls for reform (particularly in towns such as Merthyr Tydfil). Parliament eventually allowed the new towns to vote, and this introduced the first Labour MPs. The first leader of the Labour Party in Parliament, Keir Hardie, was one of the two MPs for Merthyr Tydfil. The following table shows the composition of Wales' Westminster MPs since 1885.

Year	Labour	Liberal Democrat/ Liberal	Conservative	Plaid Cymru	Independent	Liberal Unionist	Independent Labour	Others
1885	-	29	4	-	-	-	-	1
1886	-	26	6	-	-	1	-	1
1892	-	30	3	-	-	-	-	1
1895	-	24	8	-	-	1	-	1
1900	1	26	6	-	-	1	-	1
1906	1	28	-	-	-	-	1	-
1910 (Jan)	5	27	2	-	-	-	-	-
1910 (Dec)	6	26	3	-	-	-	1	-
1918	9	3	4	-	-	-	-	19
1922	18	2	6	-	-	-	1	9
1923	19	11	4	-	-	-	-	2
1924	16	11	9	-	-	-	-	-
1929	25	10	1	-	-	-	-	-
1931	15	5	6	-	-	-	1	9
1935	18	8	6	-	-	-	-	4
1945	25	7	3	-	-	-	-	1
1950	27	5	3	-	-	-	-	1
1951	27	3	5	-	-	-	-	1
1955	27	3	5	-	-	-	-	1
1959	27	2	6	-	-	-	-	1
1964	28	2	6	-	-	-	-	-
1966	32	1	3	-	-	-	-	-
1970	27	1	7	-	-	-	1	-
1974 (Feb)	24	2	8	2	-	-	-	-
1974 (Oct)	23	2	8	3	-	-	-	-
1979	22	1	11	2	-	-	-	-
1983	20	2	14	2	-	-	-	-
1987	24	3	8	3	-	-	-	-
1992	27	1	6	4	-	-	-	-
1997	34	2	-	4	-	-	-	-
2001	34	2	-	4	-	-	-	-
2005	29	4	3	3	1	-	-	-
2010	26	3	8	3	-	-	-	-
2015	25	1	11	3	-	-	-	-
2017	28	-	8	4	-	-	-	-
2019	22	-	14	4	-	-	-	-
2024	27	1	-	4	-	-	-	-

=== Detailed breakdowns ===
==== 2024 ====
Party	Seats					Aggregate votes		
Party	Total	Gains	Losses	Net	Of all (%)	Total	Of all (%)	Difference
Labour	27	+8	0	▲9	84.4	487,636	37.0	▼3.9
Conservative	0	0	−12	▼12	0.0	240,003	18.2	▼17.9
Reform	0	0	0	Steady	0.0	223,018	16.9	▲11.5
Plaid Cymru	4	+2	0	▲2	12.5	194,811	14.8	▲4.9
Liberal Democrats	1	+1	0	▲1	3.1	85,911	6.5	▲0.5
Green	0	0	0	Steady	0.0	61,662	4.7	▲3.7
Independent	0	0	0	Steady	0.0	17,593	1.3	▲0.9
Workers Party	0	Did not stand in 2019			0.0	1,545	0.1	—N/a
Abolish	0	Did not stand in 2019			0.0	1,521	0.1	—N/a
Propel	0	Did not stand in 2019			0.0	1,041	0.1	—N/a
Heritage	0	Did not stand in 2019			0.0	926	0.1	—N/a
UKIP	0	Did not stand in 2019			0.0	600	0.0	—N/a
Women's Equality	0	Did not stand in 2019			0.0	536	0.0	—N/a
TUSC	0	Did not stand in 2019			0.0	532	0.0	—N/a
Communist	0	Did not stand in 2019			0.0	521	0.0	—N/a
Libertarian	0	Did not stand in 2019			0.0	439	0.0	—N/a
Socialist Labour	0	Did not stand in 2019			0.0	424	0.0	—N/a
Monster Raving Loony	0	0	0	Steady	0.0	393	0.0	Steady
True & Fair	0	Did not stand in 2019			0.0	255	0.0	—N/a
Climate	0	Did not stand in 2019			0.0	104	0.0	—N/a
Total	32	—N/a		Steady		1,319,471	56.0	

Aggregate votes
Labour	37%
Conservative	18.2%
Reform UK	16.9%
Plaid Cymru	14.8%
Liberal Democrats	6.5%
Greens	4.7%

Parliament seats
Labour	84.375%
Plaid Cymru	12.5%
Liberal Democrats	3.125%

==== 2019 ====
Party	Seats					Votes		
Party	Total	Gains	Losses	Net +/-	% seats	Total	%	Change
Labour	22	0	6	▼6	55	632,035	40.9	▼8.0
Conservative	14	6 (Note: Not including Brecon and Radnorshire and Aberconwy, which the Conservative Party won in 2017 but did not control when parliament was dissolved.)	0	▲6	35	557,234	36.1	▲2.5
Plaid Cymru	4	0	0	Steady	10	153,265	9.9	▼0.5
Liberal Democrats	0	0	0 (Note: Not including Brecon and Radnorshire, which the Liberal Democrats won in a 2019 by-election.)	Steady	0	92,171	6.0	▲1.5
Brexit Party	0	0	0	Steady	0	83,908	5.4	new
Green	0	0	0	Steady	0	15,828	1.0	▲0.7
Independents	0	0	0 (Note: Not including Aberconwy, previously controlled by the independent Guto Bebb who lost the Conservative Party whip in 2019.)	Steady	0	6,220	0.4	N/A
Gwlad	0	0	0	Steady	0	1,515	0.1	new
Cynon Valley	0	0	0	Steady	0	1,322	0.1	new
Monster Raving Loony	0	0	0	Steady	0	345	0.0	Steady
Christian	0	0	0	Steady	0	245	0.0	new (Note: Party entered candidates in the 2017 general election but not in any Welsh seats.)
SDP	0	0	0	Steady	0	181	0.0	new
Socialist	0	0	0	Steady	0	88	0.0	new (Note: Party has entered candidates in past general elections but not the 2017 general election.)
Total	40					1,544,357	Turnout	66.6

Popular vote
Labour	40.9%
Conservative	36.1%
Plaid Cymru	9.9%
Liberal Democrats	6.0%
Brexit Party	5.0%
Greens	1.0%

Parliament seats
Labour	55%
Conservative	35%
Plaid Cymru	10%

==== 2017 ====
Party	Seats					Votes		
Party	Total	Gains	Losses	Net +/-	% seats	Total	%	Change
Labour	28	3	0	▲3	70.0	771,354	48.9	▲12.1
Conservative	8	0	3	▼3	20.0	528,839	33.6	▲6.3
Plaid Cymru	4	1	0	▲1	10.0	164,466	10.4	▼1.7
Liberal Democrats	0	0	1	▼1	—	71,039	4.5	▼2.0
UKIP	0	0	0	0	—	31,376	2.0	▼11.6
Green	0	0	0	0	—	5,128	0.3	▼2.2
Others	0	0	0	0	—	3,612	0.2	▼0.1
Total	40					1,575,814	Turnout	68.6

Popular vote
Labour	48.9%
Conservative	33.6%
Plaid Cymru	10.4%
Liberal Democrats	4.5%
UKIP	2.0%
Greens	0.3%
Other	0.2%

Parliament seats
Labour	70%
Conservative	20%
Plaid Cymru	10%

==== 2015 ====
Party	Seats					Votes		
Party	Total	Gains	Losses	Net +/-	% seats	Total	%	Change
Labour	25	1	2	▼1	62.5	552,473	36.9	▲0.6
Conservative	11	3	0	▲3	27.5	407,813	27.2	▲1.1
UKIP	0	0	0	Steady	—	204,330	13.6	▲11.2
Plaid Cymru	3	0	0	Steady	7.5	181,704	12.1	▲0.8
Liberal Democrats	1	0	2	▼2	2.5	97,783	6.5	▼13.6
Green	0	0	0	Steady	—	38,344	2.6	▲2.1
Socialist Labour	0	0	0	Steady	—	3,481	0.2	▲0.2
TUSC	0	0	0	Steady	—	1,780	0.1	▲0.1
Others	0	0	0	Steady	—	10,355	0.7	▼0.5
Total	40					1,498,063		

Popular vote
Labour	36.87%
Conservative	27.22%
UKIP	13.64%
Plaid Cymru	12.13%
Liberal Democrats	6.53%
Greens	2.56%
Other	1.05%

Parliament seats
Labour	62.50%
Conservative	27.50%
Plaid Cymru	7.50%
Liberal Democrats	2.50%

==== 2010 ====
Party	Seats					Votes		
Party	Total	Gains	Losses	Net +/-	% seats	Total	%	Change
Labour	26	1	5	▼4	65.0	531,601	36.2	▼6.5
Conservative	8	5	0	▲5	20.0	382,730	26.1	▲4.7
Liberal Democrats	3	0	1	▼1	7.5	295,164	20.1	▲1.7
Plaid Cymru	3	1	0	▲1	7.5	165,394	11.3	▼1.3
UKIP	0	0	0	0	—	35,690	2.4	▲1.0
BNP	0	0	0	0	—	23,088	1.6	▲1.5
Green	0	0	0	0	—	6,293	0.4	▼0.1
Christian	0	0	0	0	—	1,947	0.1	N/A
TUSC	0	0	0	0	—	341	0.0	N/A
Others	0	0	1	▼1	—	24,442	1.7	▼1.1
Total	40					1,466,690		64.9

Popular vote
Labour	36.2%
Conservative	26.1%
Liberal Democrats	20.1%
Plaid Cymru	11.3%
UKIP	2.4%
BNP	1.6%
Greens	0.4%
Other	1.8%

Parliament seats
Labour	65.0%
Conservative	20.0%
Liberal Democrats	7.50%
Plaid Cymru	7.50%

==== 2005 ====
Party	Candidates	Seats	Seats change	Votes	%	% change
Labour		29	▼5	594,821	42.7	▼5.9
Conservative		3	▲3	297,830	21.4	▲0.4
Liberal Democrats		4	▲2	256,249	18.4	▲4.6
Plaid Cymru		3	▼1	174,838	12.6	▼1.7
UKIP		0	Steady	20,297	1.5	
Green		0	Steady	7,144	0.5	
Forward Wales		0	Steady	3,461	0.2	
Legalise Cannabis		0	Steady	1,772	0.1	
BNP		0	Steady	1,689	0.1	
Socialist Labour		0	Steady	1,605	0.1	
Veritas		0	Steady	1,437	0.1	
Respect		0	Steady	643	0.0	
Liberal		0	Steady	605	0.0	
Socialist Alliance		0	Steady	557	0.0	
Communist		0	Steady	440	0.0	
Yourself		0	Steady	284	0.0	
Bean Party		0	Steady	159	0.0	
Independent		1	▲1	28,888	2.3	
Turnout:				1,392,719	62.4	

==== 2001 ====
Party	Candidates	Seats	Seats change	Votes	%	% change
Labour	40	34	Steady	666,956	48.6	▼6.1
Conservative	40	0	Steady	288,623	21.0	▲1.4
Plaid Cymru	40	4	Steady	195,893	14.3	▲4.4
Liberal Democrats		2	Steady	189,254	13.8	▲1.5
UKIP		0	Steady	12,552	0.9	
Green		0	Steady	3,753	0.3	
Socialist Labour		0	Steady	2,805	0.2	
Socialist Alliance		0	Steady	2,258	0.2	
ProLife Alliance		0	Steady	1,609	0.1	
Communist		0	Steady	384	0.0	
BNP		0	Steady	278	0.0	
Others			Steady	7,959	0.6	
Turnout:			1,372,324	61.6		

==== 1997 ====
Party	Seats					Votes		
Party	Total	Gains	Losses	Net +/-	% seats	Total votes	% votes	Change
Labour	34	7	0	▲7	85.0	885,935	54.7	▲5.2
Conservative	0	0	8	▼8	—	317,127	19.6	▼9.0
Liberal Democrats	2	1	0	▲1	5.0	200,020	12.4	▼0.1
Plaid Cymru	4	0	0	Steady	10.0	161,030	10.0	▲1.1
Referendum	0	0	0	Steady	—	38,245	2.4	New
Socialist Labour	0	0	0	Steady	—	6,203	0.4	New
Independent Labour	0	0	0	Steady	—	4,633	0.3	New
Independent	0	0	0	Steady	—	2,258	0.2	N/A
Green	0	0	0	Steady	—	1,718	0.1	▼0.3
Other parties	0	0	0	Steady	—	3,087	0.2	N/A

==== 1992 ====
Party	Seats					Votes		
Party	Total	Gains	Losses	Net +/-	% seats	Total votes	% votes	Change
Labour	27	3	0	▲3	71.1	865,663	49.5	▲4.4
Conservative	6	1	3	▼2	15.8	499,677	28.6	▼0.9
Liberal Democrats	1	0	2	▼2	2.6	217,457	12.4	▼5.5
Plaid Cymru	4	1	0	▲1	10.5	156,747	9.0	▲1.7
Others	0	0	0	Steady	—	9,233	0.5	▲0.3

==== 1987 ====
Party	Seats					Votes		
Party	Total	Gains	Losses	Net +/-	% seats	Total votes	% votes	Change
Labour	24	4	0	▲4	63.2	765,209	45.1	▲7.6
Conservative	8	0	6	▼6	21.1	501,316	29.5	▼1.5
Alliance	3	1	0	▲1	7.9	304,230	17.9	▼5.3
Plaid Cymru	3	1	0	▲1	7.9	123,599	7.3	▼0.5
Others	0	0	0	Steady	—	3,742	0.2	▼0.2

==== 1983 ====
Party	Seats					Votes		
Party	Total	Gains	Losses	Net +/-	% seats	Total votes	% votes	Change
Labour	20	0	3	▼3	52.6	603,858	37.5	▼9.4
Conservative	14	3	1	▲2	36.8	499,310	31.0	▼1.2
Alliance	2	1	0	▲1	5.3	373,358	23.2	▲12.6
Plaid Cymru	2	0	0	Steady	5.3	125,309	7.8	▼0.2
Other parties	0	0	0	Steady	—	7,151	0.4	▼1.9

== European Parliament ==
Wales was a constituency in European Parliament elections. Following the United Kingdom's exit from the European Union on 31 January 2020, Wales no longer elects representatives to the European Parliament.

=== Detailed breakdowns ===
==== 2019 ====
European Election 2019: Wales
List	Candidates	Votes	Of total (%)	± from prev.
Brexit Party	Nathan Gill (1) James Wells (3) Gethin James, Julie Price	271,404 (135,702)	32.46	▲32.46
Plaid Cymru	Jill Evans (2) Carmen Smith, Patrick McGuinness, Ioan Bellin	163,928	19.60	▲4.34
Labour	Jacqueline Jones (4) Matthew Dorrance, Mary Wimbury, Mark Whitcott	127,833	15.29	▼12.86
Liberal Democrats	Sam Bennett, Donna Lalek, Alistair Cameron, Andrew Parkhurst	113,885	13.62	▲9.67
Conservative	Daniel Boucher, Craig Lawton, Fay Jones, Tomos Davies	54,587	6.53	▼10.90
Green	Anthony Slaughter, Ian Chandler, Ceri Davies, Duncan Rees	52,660	6.30	▲1.76
UKIP	Kristian Hicks, Keith Edwards, Thomas Harrison, Robert McNeil-Wilson	27,566	3.30	▼24.26
Change UK	Jon Owen Jones, June Davies, Matthew Paul, Sally Anne Stephenson	24,332	2.91	▲2.91
Turnout		836,195	37.1	▲5.6

===== 2019 opinion polls =====
Date(s)	Polling organisation/client	Sample	Lab	UKIP	Con	Plaid	Green	Lib Dems	Brexit	Change UK	Others	Lead
16–20 May 2019	YouGov/ITV	1,009	15%	2%	7%	19%	8%	10%	36%	2%	0%	17%
10–15 May 2019	YouGov/Plaid Cymru	1,133	18%	3%	7%	16%	8%	10%	33%	4%	0%	15%
2–5 April 2019	YouGov/ITV	1,025	30%	11%	16%	15%	5%	6%	10%	8%	1%	14%
22 May 2014	2014 EU election results	733,060	28.2%	27.6%	17.4%	15.3%	4.5%	4.0%	N/A	N/A	3.2%	0.6%

==== 2014 ====
European Election 2014: Wales
List	Candidates	Votes	Of total (%)	± from prev.
Labour	Derek Vaughan Jayne Bryant, Alex Thomas, Christina Rees	206,332	28.15	+7.9
UKIP	Nathan Gill James Cole, Caroline Jones, David Rowlands	201,983	27.55	+14.8
Conservative	Kay Swinburne Aled Davies, Dan Boucher, Richard Hopkin	127,742	17.43	−3.8
Plaid Cymru	Jill Evans Marc Jones, Stephen Cornelius, Ioan Bellin	111,864	15.26	−3.3
Green	Pippa Bartolotti, John Matthews, Chris Were, Rosemary Cutler	33,275	4.54	−1.0
Liberal Democrats	Alec Dauncey, Robert Speht, Jackie Radford, Bruce Roberts	28,930	3.95	−6.7
BNP	Mike Whitby, Laurence Reid, Jean Griffin, Gary Tumulty	7,655	1.04	−4.4
Britain First	Paul Golding, Anthony Golding, Christine Smith, Anne Elstone	6,633	0.9	0.00
Socialist Labour	Andrew Jordan, Katherine Jones, David Lloyd Jones, Liz Screen	4,459	0.61	−1.2
NO2EU	Robert Griffiths, Claire Job, Steve Skelly, Laura Picand	2,803	0.38	−0.9
Socialist (GB)	Brian Johnson, Richard Cheney, Ed Blewitt, Howard Moss	1,384	0.19	0.00
Turnout		733,060	31.5	+1.1

==== 2009 ====
European Election 2009: Wales
List	Candidates	Votes	Of total (%)	± from prev.
Conservative	Kay Swinburne Evan Price, Emma Greenow, David Chipp	145,193	21.2	+1.8
Labour	Derek Vaughan Lisa Stevens, Rachel Maycock, Leighton Veale	138,852	20.3	−12.2
Plaid Cymru	Jill Evans Eurig Wyn, Ioan Bellin, Natasha Asghar	126,702	18.5	+1.1
UKIP	John Bufton David Bevan, Kevin Mahoney, David Rowlands	87,585	12.8	+2.3
Liberal Democrats	Alan Butt Phillip, Kevin O'Connor, Nick Tregoning, Jackie Radford	73,082	10.7	+0.2
Green	Jake Griffiths, Kay Roney, Ann Were, John Matthews	38,160	5.6	+2.0
BNP	Ennys Hughes, Laurence Read, Clive Bennett, Kevin Edwards	37,114	5.4	+2.5
Christian	Jeffrey Green, David Griffiths, Alun Owen, John Harrold	13,037	1.9	N/A
Socialist Labour	Robert English, Richard Booth, Liz Screen, Judith Sambrook	12,402	1.8	N/A
NO2EU	Robert Griffiths, Rob Williams, Laura Picand, Trevor Jones	8,600	1.3	N/A
Jury Team	Paul Sabanskis, James Eustace, Neil Morgan, Steven Partridge	3,793	0.6	N/A
Turnout		684,520	30.4	−11.0

==== 2004 ====
European Election 2004: Wales
List	Candidates	Votes	Of total (%)	± from prev.
Labour	Glenys Kinnock, Eluned Morgan Gareth Williams, Gwennan Jeremiah	297,810 (148,905)	32.5	+0.6
Conservative	Jonathan Evans Owen Williams, Felicity Elphick, Albert Fox	177,771	19.4	−3.3
Plaid Cymru	Jill Evans Jon Blackwood, Eilian Williams, Gwenllian Lansdown	159,888	17.4	−12.2
UKIP	David Rowlands, Clive Easton, Elizabeth Phillips, Timothy Jenkins	96,677	10.5	+7.4
Liberal Democrats	David John Williams, Alison Goldsworthy, Nicholas Tregoning, Nilmini Priyanga de Silva	96,116	10.5	+2.3
Green	Martyn Shrewsbury, Molly Scott Cato, David Bradney, Dorienne Robinson	32,761	3.6	+1.0
BNP	John Walker, Pauline Gregory, James Roberts, Mark Stringfellow	27,135	3.0	N/A
Forward Wales	Ron Davies, Wendy Paintsil, Janet Williams, Graham Jones	17,280	1.9	N/A
Christian Democratic Party	Catherine Smith, Christine West, Joseph Biddulph, Robert Evans	6,821	0.7	N/A
Respect	Helen Griffin, Huw Williams, Raja Gul Raiz, Taran O'Sullivan	5,427	0.6	N/A
Turnout		917,686	41.4	+12.4

==== 1999 ====
European Election 1999: Wales
List	Candidates	Votes	Of total (%)	± from prev.
Labour	Glenys Kinnock, Eluned Morgan Joe Wilson, Gareth Williams, Jane Hutt	199,690 (99,845)	31.9	N/A
Plaid Cymru	Jill Evans, Eurig Wyn Marc Phillips, Susanna Perkins, Owain Llywelyn	185,235 (92,617.5)	29.6	N/A
Conservative	Jonathan Evans Chris Butler, Owen John Williams, Robert Buckland, Edmund Hayward	142,631	22.8	N/A
Liberal Democrats	Roger Roberts, Peter Price, Alistair Cameron, Juliana Hughes, John Dixon	51,283	8.2	N/A
UKIP	Dai Rees, Niall Warry, Idris Richard Francis, Alan Barham, David Lloyd	19,702	3.1	N/A
Green	Molly Scott Cato, Klaus Armstrong-Braun, Sue Walker, Rachel Kalela, John Matthews	16,146	2.6	N/A
Pro-Euro Conservative	William Powell, Jennifer Harris, Antonio Fernandes-Vidal, Alan Morris, Christopher Hodgkinson	5,834	0.9	N/A
Socialist Labour	Elizabeth Screen, Darren Hickery, Stephen Bell, Miriam Bowen, George Tafarides	4,283	0.7	N/A
Natural Law	David Hughes, Brian Francis, Helen Evans, Andrea Jarman, John Ashforth	1,621	0.3	N/A
Turnout		626,425	29.0	N/A

==== 1994 ====
Party	Seats	Seats change	Votes	%	% change
Labour	5	▲1	530,749	55.86	▲6.93
Plaid Cymru	0	Steady	162,478	17.10	▲4.21
Conservative	0	Steady	138,349	14.56	▼8.89
Liberal Democrats	0	Steady	82,480	8.68	▲5.46
Green	0	Steady	19,413	2.04	▼9.11
Natural Law	0	–	6,081	0.64	–
UKIP	0	–	5,536	0.58	–
Independent	0	–	2,729	0.29	–
Socialist Alliance	0	–	1,270	1.33	–
Communist	0	–	1,073	0.11	–
Turnout:			950,158		

==== 1989 ====
Party	Seats	Seats change	Votes	%	% change
Labour	4	▲1	436,730	48.93	▲4.40
Conservative	0	▼1	209,313	23.45	▼1.91
Plaid Cymru	0	Steady	115,062	12.89	▲0.69
Green	0	Steady	99,546	11.15	▲10.64
SLD	0	Steady	28,785	3.22	▼14.18
SDP	0	–	3,153	0.35	–
Turnout:			892,589		

==== 1984 ====
Party	Seats	Seats change	Votes	%	% change
Labour	3	Steady	375,982	44.53	▲2.83
Conservative	1	Steady	214,086	25.36	▼10.98
Alliance	0	Steady	146,947	17.40	▲7.79
Plaid Cymru	0	Steady	103,031	12.20	▲0.41
Ecology	0	–	4,266	0.51	–
Turnout:			844,312		

==== 1979 ====
Party	Seats	Seats change	Votes	%	% change
Labour	3	–	294,978	41.70	–
Conservative	1	–	257,029	36.34	–
Plaid Cymru	0	–	83,399	11.79	–
Liberal	0	–	67,962	9.61	–
Independent	0	–	4,008	0.57	–
Turnout:			707,376		

== See also ==
- Elections in the United Kingdom
- Elections in England
- Elections in Northern Ireland
- Elections in Scotland
