= 1995 Merthyr Tydfil County Borough Council election =

1995 Welsh local government election

- 4 May 1995

All 33 seats to Merthyr Tydfil County Borough Council 17 seats needed for a majority
	First party	Second party
	Lab	Ind
Leader	N/A	N/A
Party	Labour	Independent
Leader's seat	N/A	N/A
Seats before	-	-
Seats won	29	4
Seat change	▲29	▲4
Popular vote	33,244	17,673
Percentage	62.8%	33.38%

The first election to Merthyr Tydfil County Borough Council following the re-organization of local government in Wales was held on 4 May 1995. It was followed by the 1999 elections. On the same day there were elections to the other 21 local authorities in Wales and community councils in Wales. Labour won a vast majority of the seats.

== Overview ==
All council seats were up for election. These were the first elections held following local government reorganisation and the abolition of Mid Glamorgan County Council. The ward boundaries for the new authority were based on the previous Merthyr Tydfil Borough Council.

Merthyr Tydfil County Borough Council election result 1995
Party	Seats	Gains	Losses	Net gain/loss	Seats %	Votes %	Votes	+/−
Labour	29							
Plaid Cymru	0				0.0		1,171	
Green	0				0.0		365	
Independent	2							
Independent Residents	2							

== Results ==
=== Bedlinog (two seats) ===
Bedlinog 1995
Party	Candidate	Votes	%	±%
Labour	H. Williams	692		
Labour	Helen Thomas	660		
Independent	R. Barrar	457		
Independent	G. Roberts	347		
Turnout			41.5	
Labour win (new seat)				
Labour win (new seat)				

=== Cyfarthfa (three seats) ===
Cyfarthfa 1995
Party	Candidate	Votes	%	±%
Independent Residents	Les Elliott	1,118		
Labour	Ms C. Evans	1,030		
Labour	Ms J. Jones	864		
Independent Residents	Len Goodwin	823		
Labour	W. King	732		
Independent Residents	M. Popp	608		
Turnout			37.6	
Independent win (new seat)				
Labour win (new seat)				
Labour win (new seat)				

=== Dowlais (four seats) ===
Dowlais 1995
Party	Candidate	Votes	%	±%
Labour	Ray Thomas	1,299		
Labour	Tom Lewis	1,043		
Labour	John Pritchard	984		
Independent Residents	W. Healy	968		
Labour	Harry Harbord	953		
Independent Residents	H. Len Hargreaves	883		
Independent	Julian Amos	552		
Independent Residents	Ms A. Maliphant	535		
Turnout			36.4	
Labour win (new seat)				
Labour win (new seat)				
Labour win (new seat)				
Independent win (new seat)				

=== Gurnos (four seats) ===
Gurnos 1995
Party	Candidate	Votes	%	±%
Labour	J. Cleary	1,020		
Labour	William Smith	993		
Labour	O. Griffiths	914		
Labour	Dave Jarrett	888		
Independent Residents	Ms D. Johnson	256		
Independent Residents	Ms R. Thomas	180		
Turnout			29.0	
Labour win (new seat)				
Labour win (new seat)				
Labour win (new seat)				
Labour win (new seat)				

=== Merthyr Vale (two seats) ===
Merthyr Vale 1995
Party	Candidate	Votes	%	±%
Labour	David Lewis	1,201		
Labour	Enos Sims	1,089		
Independent	Jeff. Edwards	1,033		
Independent	A. Treen	486		
Turnout			60.9	
Labour win (new seat)				
Labour win (new seat)				

=== Park (three seats) ===
Park 1995
Party	Candidate	Votes	%	±%
Labour	J. Leon Stanfield	795		
Labour	Dave Phillips	782		
Labour	Elizabeth Tate	751		
Independent Residents	J. Johnson	579		
Independent Residents	Ms J. Jones	478		
Independent Residents	Ms K. Thomas	441		
Turnout			39.8	
Labour win (new seat)				
Labour win (new seat)				
Labour win (new seat)				

=== Penydarren (three seats) ===
Penydarren 1995
Party	Candidate	Votes	%	±%
Labour	T. Mahoney	998		
Labour	P. Saunders	962		
Labour	M. Keane	868		
Independent Residents	D. James	814		
Independent Residents	Ms D. Edwards	652		
Turnout			40.1	
Labour win (new seat)				
Labour win (new seat)				
Labour win (new seat)				

=== Plymouth (three seats) ===
Plymouth 1995
Party	Candidate	Votes	%	±%
Labour	H. Jones	1,460		
Labour	D. Games	1,335		
Labour	J. Handley	1,017		
Independent Residents	B. Griffiths	636		
Independent	M. Elliott	508		
Turnout			47.4	
Labour win (new seat)				
Labour win (new seat)				
Labour win (new seat)				

=== Town (four seats) ===
Town 1995
Party	Candidate	Votes	%	±%
Labour	Ms L. Matthews	1,376		
Labour	I. Clark	1,354		
Labour	C. Jones	1,255		
Labour	T. Davies	1,214		
Plaid Cymru	W. Thomas	1,171		
Independent	C. Davies	643		
Independent Residents	J. Rees	471		
Independent	Ms S. Baynham	447		
Turnout			43.6	
Labour win (new seat)				
Labour win (new seat)				
Labour win (new seat)				
Labour win (new seat)				

=== Treharris (three seats) ===
Treharris 1995
Party	Candidate	Votes	%	±%
Labour	Ms G. Evans	1,299		
Labour	A. Jones	1,228		
Independent	E. Galsworthy	1,040		
Labour	D. Scully	766		
Green	K. Williams	365		
Turnout			38.0	
Labour win (new seat)				
Labour win (new seat)				
Independent win (new seat)				

=== Vaynor (two seats) ===
Vaynor 1995
Party	Candidate	Votes	%	±%
Independent	A. Baynham	933		
Labour	Ms C. Rogers	902		
Labour	M. Chambers	663		
Independent	B. Wilson	353		
Turnout			55.8	
Independent win (new seat)				
Labour win (new seat)				
