= 1999 Merthyr Tydfil County Borough Council election =

1999 Welsh local government election

← 1995	4 May 1999	2004 →

All 33 seats to Merthyr Tydfil County Borough Council 17 seats needed for a majority
	First party	Second party	Third party
	Lab	Ind	Pla
Leader	N/A	N/A	N/A
Party	Labour	Independent	Plaid Cymru
Leader's seat	N/A	N/A	N/A
Seats before	29	4	0
Seats won	16	13	4
Seat change	▼13	▲9	▲4
Popular vote	N/A	N/A	N/A
Percentage	N/A	N/A	N/A

The second election to Merthyr Tydfil County Borough Council following the re-organization of local government in Wales was held on 6 May 1999. It was preceded by the 1995 election and followed by the 2004 election. On the same day the first elections to the Welsh Assembly were held as well as elections to the other 21 local authorities in Wales.

Labour lost thirteen seats and their majority on the council.

== Overview ==
All council seats were up for election. These were the second elections held following local government reorganisation and the abolition of Mid Glamorgan County Council. The ward boundaries for the new authority were based on the previous Merthyr Tydfil Borough Council.

Merthyr Tydfil County Borough Council election result 1999
Party	Seats	Gains	Losses	Net gain/loss	Seats %	Votes %	Votes	+/−
Labour	16	0	13	-13				
Liberal Democrats	0						781	
Plaid Cymru	4	4	0	+4				
Green	0						189	
Independent	13	9	0	+9				

== Results ==
=== Bedlinog (two seats) ===
Bedlinog 1999
Party	Candidate	Votes	%	±%
Independent	Leighton Smart	828		
Labour	Helen Thomas*	664		
Labour	Ian Thomas	392		
Turnout			56.2	+14.7
Independent gain from Labour		Swing		
Labour hold		Swing		

=== Cyfarthfa (three seats) ===
Cyfarthfa 1999
Party	Candidate	Votes	%	±%
Independent	Les Elliott*	1,483		
Independent	Len Goodwin	1,140		
Independent	Lynda Williams	989		
Labour	S. Paul Brown	754		
Labour	Alison. Chaplin	679		
Labour	Pamela. Watkins	517		
Turnout			47.6	+10.0
Independent hold		Swing		
Independent gain from Labour		Swing		
Independent gain from Labour		Swing		

=== Dowlais (four seats) ===
Pritchard had been elected as a Labour candidate in 1995.

Dowlais 1999
Party	Candidate	Votes	%	±%
Independent	H. Len Hargreaves	947		
Labour	Ray Thomas*	878		
Independent	John Pritchard*	823		
Independent	Phillip Owens	822		
Independent	Julian Amos	806		
Plaid Cymru	Alan Cowdell	804		
Labour	Tom Lewis*	769		
Labour	Mike Sullivan*	727		
Labour	Harry Harbord	712		
Turnout			41.0	+4.6
Independent gain from Labour		Swing		
Labour hold		Swing		
Independent hold		Swing		
Independent gain from Labour		Swing		

=== Gurnos (four seats) ===
Labour won all four seats in 1995 when Phillips had been elected as a Labour councilor for the Park ward.

Gurnos 1999
Party	Candidate	Votes	%	±%
Independent	Dave Phillips*	743		
Labour	Bernard Driscoll*	681		
Labour	Allan Davies	635		
Labour	William Smith*	619		
Independent	John Mantle	548		
Labour	Dave Jarrett*	531		
Turnout			35.8	+6.8
Independent gain from Labour		Swing		
Labour hold		Swing		
Labour hold		Swing		
Labour win (new seat)				

=== Merthyr Vale (two seats) ===
Merthyr Vale 1999
Party	Candidate	Votes	%	±%
Independent	Jeff Edwards	1,266		
Labour	David Lewis*	896		
Labour	Enos Sims*	672		
Turnout			72.0	+11.1
Independent gain from Labour		Swing		
Labour hold		Swing		

=== Park (three seats) ===
Labour won all three seats in 1995 but one of the sitting members joined Plaid Cymru while another stood as an Independent candidate in the Gurnos ward.

Park 1999
Party	Candidate	Votes	%	±%
Labour	Brendan Toomey	783		
Labour	J. Leon Stanfield*	731		
Labour	Louise Garcia	652		
Independent	Ann. Amos	596		
Plaid Cymru	Marion Morris	592		
Plaid Cymru	Elizabeth Tate*	484		
Liberal Democrats	Huw Eynon	408		
Turnout			68.6	+28.8
Labour hold		Swing		
Labour hold		Swing		
Labour hold		Swing		

=== Penydarren (three seats) ===
Penydarren 1999
Party	Candidate	Votes	%	±%
Independent	D. James	1,117		
Labour	P. Saunders*	931		
Labour	T. Mahoney*	851		
Labour	I. Jones	752		
Turnout			50.3	+10.2
Independent gain from Labour		Swing		
Labour hold		Swing		
Labour hold		Swing		

=== Plymouth (three seats) ===
Plymouth 1999
Party	Candidate	Votes	%	±%
Labour	H. Jones*	1,190		
Labour	R. Clark	1,024		
Labour	D. Games*	966		
Plaid Cymru	H. Voyle	935		
Independent	A. Challis	852		
Turnout			77.5	+30.1
Labour hold		Swing		
Labour hold		Swing		
Labour hold		Swing		

=== Town (four seats) ===
Town 1999
Party	Candidate	Votes	%	±%
Plaid Cymru	W. Thomas	1,421		
Plaid Cymru	V. Pugh	1,183		
Plaid Cymru	D. Griffiths	1,101		
Plaid Cymru	Ms S. Pengelly	983		
Labour	I. Clark*	969		
Labour	C. Jones*	931		
Labour	Ms L. Matthews*	929		
Labour	T. Davies*	841		
Independent	A. Green	590		
Turnout			56.7	+13.1
Plaid Cymru gain from Labour		Swing		
Plaid Cymru gain from Labour		Swing		
Plaid Cymru gain from Labour		Swing		
Plaid Cymru gain from Labour		Swing		

=== Treharris (four seats) ===
Galsworthy had been elected as an Independent in 1995.

Treharris 1999
Party	Candidate	Votes	%	±%
Labour	E. Galsworthy*	889		
Labour	Ms G. Evans*	821		
Independent	R. Whitehouse	819		
Labour	A. Jones*	771		
Independent	Ms M. Shankland	664		
Plaid Cymru	R. Hughes	595		
Independent	M. Moran	407		
Liberal Democrats	C. Richards	373		
Independent	J. Gilbert	301		
Green	K. Williams	189		
Turnout			59.3	+20.7
Labour hold		Swing		
Labour hold		Swing		
Independent hold		Swing		

=== Vaynor (two seats) ===
Vaynor 1999
Party	Candidate	Votes	%	±%
Independent	A. Baynham*	1,050		
Independent	M. Vaughan	765		
Labour	C. Owen	318		
Labour	G. Watkins	257		
Communist	R. Evans	171		
Turnout			58.8	+3.0
Independent hold		Swing		
Labour hold		Swing		
