= 1995 Gwynedd Council election =

1995 Welsh local government election

The first election to Gwynedd County Council (at the time known as Caernarfonshire and Merionethshire County Council) was held on 4 May 1995. It was followed by the 1999 election. Results are drawn from the national press.

== Overview ==
The previous Gwynedd Council had an Independent majority from 1973 until 1993 and was under no overall control thereafter. However, Plaid Cymru secured control of the new authority.

== Summary of Results ==
Gwynedd Council election result 1995
Party	Seats	Gains	Losses	Net gain/loss	Seats %	Votes %	Votes	+/−
Plaid Cymru	45				54.2	43.0		
Independent	26				31.3	40.3		
Labour	9				10.8	14.1		
Liberal Democrats	3				3.6	2.0		
Green	0				0.0	0.7		
Other parties	0				0.0	0.1		

== Ward Results (Arfon) ==
=== Bethel (one seat) ===
Bethel 1995
Party	Candidate	Votes	%	±%
Plaid Cymru	R.H. Williams*	Unopposed		
Plaid Cymru win (new seat)				

=== Bontnewydd (one seat) ===
Bontnewydd 1995
Party	Candidate	Votes	%	±%
Plaid Cymru	Dafydd Iwan	319		
Independent	H. Owen*	301		
Majority		18		
Plaid Cymru win (new seat)				

=== Cadnant (one seat) ===
Cadnant 1995
Party	Candidate	Votes	%	±%
Independent	Mair H. Ellis*	661		
Independent	E. Jones	264		
Majority		18		
Independent win (new seat)				

=== Deiniol (one seat) ===
Deiniol 1995
Party	Candidate	Votes	%	±%
Labour	David F. Jones	109		
Liberal Democrats	Alison G. Taylor	88		
Plaid Cymru	Rhodri V. Davies	73		
Independent	John P. Turner	50		
Majority		21		
Labour win (new seat)				

=== Deiniolen (one seat) ===
Deiniolen 1995
Party	Candidate	Votes	%	±%
Plaid Cymru	R.L. Jones	unopposed		
Plaid Cymru win (new seat)				

=== Dewi (one seat) ===
Dewi 1995
Party	Candidate	Votes	%	±%
Labour	Edward T. Dogan*	520		
Liberal Democrats	John M. Martin	105		
Majority				
Labour win (new seat)				

=== Garth (one seat) ===
Garth 1995
Party	Candidate	Votes	%	±%
Plaid Cymru	Freda C. Eames*	unopposed		
Plaid Cymru win (new seat)				

=== Gerlan (one seat) ===
Gerlan 1995
Party	Candidate	Votes	%	±%
Plaid Cymru	Dafydd Orwig*	367		
Labour	C.J. O'Marah	219		
Majority		148		
Plaid Cymru win (new seat)				

=== Glyder (one seat) ===
Glyder 1995
Party	Candidate	Votes	%	±%
Independent	Mair Williams*	Unopposed		
Majority				
Independent win (new seat)				

=== Hendre (one seat) ===
Hendre 1995
Party	Candidate	Votes	%	±%
Labour	Thomas G. Webb	253		
Liberal Democrats	Kathlen Mary Thomas	132		
Majority		121		
Labour win (new seat)				

=== Hirael (one seat) ===
Hirael 1995
Party	Candidate	Votes	%	±%
Independent	Jean A. Roscoe	244		
Labour	John M. Williams	220		
Majority		24		
Independent win (new seat)				

=== Llanberis (one seat) ===
Llanberis 1995
Party	Candidate	Votes	%	±%
Plaid Cymru	R.N. Davies*	616		
Labour	K. Parry	378		
Majority		38		
Plaid Cymru win (new seat)				

=== Llanllyfni (one seat) ===
Llanllyfni 1995
Party	Candidate	Votes	%	±%
Plaid Cymru	O.P. Huws*	Unopposed	N/A	N/A
Plaid Cymru win (new seat)				

=== Marchog (two seats) ===
Marchog 1995
Party	Candidate	Votes	%	±%
Labour	Keith Greenly-Jones	455		
Labour	Llewelyn Ll. Davies	271		
Liberal Democrats	Anne M. Williams	92		
Labour win (new seat)				
Labour win (new seat)				

=== Menai (two seats) ===
Menai 1995
Party	Candidate	Votes	%	±%
Liberal Democrats	Thomas Arwyn Evans	Unopposed		
Liberal Democrats	June E. Marshall	Unopposed		
Liberal Democrats win (new seat)				
Liberal Democrats win (new seat)				
