= Wales Green Party =

Wales Green Party Plaid Werdd Cymru
- Leader: Anthony Slaughter
- Deputy leader: Linda Rogers
- Preceded by: Green Party (UK)
- Headquarters: The Gate; Keppoch Street; Cardiff; CF24 5TR
- Youth wing: Wales Young Greens
- LGBT wing: Welsh Green Pride
- Membership (March 2026): 8,000+
- Ideology: Green politics; Progressivism; Welsh independence
- Political position: Left-wing
- European affiliation: European Green Party
- International affiliation: Global Greens
- UK Parliament affiliation: Green Party of England and Wales
- Colours: Green
- House of Commons: 0 / 32 (Welsh seats)
- Senedd: 2 / 96
- Councillors in Wales: 14 / 1,234
- Councils led in Wales: 0 / 22

Website
- wales.greenparty.org.uk

The Wales Green Party (Welsh: Plaid Werdd Cymru) is an autonomous national party within the Green Party of England and Wales (GPEW) covering Wales. The Wales Green Party puts up candidates for council, Senedd, and UK Parliament seats. The party currently has two elected members of the Senedd (Welsh Parliament), and fourteen councillors. Since 2018, the Wales Green Party has been led by Anthony Slaughter, who is a member of the Senedd.

From the 1990s until the mid-2020s the party saw small successes including gaining its first elected Councillors on the Llanelli Borough Council in 1991, and gaining an elected MP, in the form of Cynog Dafis, on a joint ticket with Plaid Cymru from 1992 until 1997. Since the election of Zack Polanski as party-wide leader in 2025, the party's membership has increased, surpassing 8,000 members as of May 2026. As the Senedd Election approached in 2026, the party began to see a sharp increase in polls, even surpassing the Welsh Conservatives in some polls in the run up to the election. At the election, the party gained its first ever representation in the Senedd, with leader Anthony Slaughter gaining his seat in Caerdydd Penarth and Paul Rock gaining a seat in Caerdydd Ffynnon Taf.

== Organisation, leadership and representation ==
The current Leader of the Wales Green Party is Anthony Slaughter, with Linda Rogers as the deputy leader. Wales-wide decisions are taken by the Wales Green Party Council, which is composed of the spokespeople, elected officers, and a representative from each local party.

Role	Name	First elected
Leader	Anthony Slaughter	2018 (re-elected in 2021 and 2024)
Deputy Leader	Linda Rogers	2024

As of 2026, Wales Green Party is represented by David Griffin on the Green Party Council, with the second Wales seat being currently vacant.

In April 2023, one of the Wales Green Party's Co-Deputy Leaders, Amerjit Kaur-Dhaliwal, stepped down from their role, saying that "volunteering at this time has become a luxury I can no longer afford, given the cost-of-living crises."

In October 2026, the Welsh Green's Co-deputy Leader, Phil Davies, resigned citing lack of support from the Green Party of England and Wales towards the Welsh party, as well as the passage of a "Zionism is Racism" motion at the 2026 Green Party of England and Wales Conference as the final trigger.

=== Leadership history ===
Pippa Bartolotti became Wales Green Party Leader in January 2012. She stood unsuccessfully for the leadership of the Green Party of England and Wales later that year. After four years of leadership, Bartolotti decided against standing for a further term as Leader in 2015. The leadership election was won by Alice Hooker-Stroud, with Hannah Pudner becoming Deputy Leader. Hooker-Stroud was then re-elected in 2016 along with Grenville Ham and Pippa Bartolotti as Deputy Leaders. Hooker-Stroud resigned in 2017, stating that her position had become untenable due to the voluntary nature of the role. Hooker-Stroud was succeeded in early 2017 by Ham. Ham defected to Plaid Cymru in late 2018 citing the party's vote to remain a part of the Green Party of England and Wales instead of becoming an independent party like the Scottish Greens. Mirka Virtanen was elected Deputy Leader in 2016 to begin in 2017, replacing Bartolotti, and Benjamin Smith was co-opted to the vacant Deputy Leader role in July 2017.

Anthony Slaughter who was formerly Deputy Leader was named the Leader of Wales Green Party in December 2018, beating Virtanen who was Deputy Leader at the time and Alex Harris. Duncan Rees was elected Deputy Leader. Mirka was co-opted back into the Deputy Leader role until December 2019. Lauren James was selected to replace her in April 2020.

==== Leaders ====
Leader		From	To
1	Martyn Shrewsbury	2004	2006
2	Ann Were	2006	2007
3	Leila Kiersch	2007	2009
4	Jake Griffiths	2009	31 December 2011
5	Pippa Bartolotti	31 December 2011	2015
6	Alice Hooker-Stroud	2015	2017
7	Grenville Ham	2017	2018
8	Anthony Slaughter	7–21 December 2018	Incumbent

=== Green Isles Alliance ===
Wales Green Party is represented on a Green Isles Alliance which includes Green parties from England and Wales, Scotland, Ireland, Northern Ireland and the Isle of Man. The alliance acts as a forum for the parties to advance shared political goals.

=== Membership ===
In July 2018, the Wales Green Party had around 1,500 members. In April 2023, the Wales Green Party was reported to have over 1,800 members. By the end of 2019, the Green Party in England and Wales had a combined 49,013 members (up from 38,707 in 2018). In October 2024, the Wales Green Party had 2,006 members. By November 2025, the party had reached just under 6,000 members. By March 2026, the Wales Green Party's membership had passed 8,000.

== History ==
=== Ecology Party era (1972–1990) ===
The Green Parties in the United Kingdom have their roots in the PEOPLE Party which was founded in 1972. In 1973, three Welsh Green candidates (P. Jones, W. Jones and V. Carney) won seats in the inaugural Welsh district council elections in the Gadlys and Town wards on Cynon Valley Borough Council. The party was renamed to the Ecology Party in 1975, and then the Green Party in 1985.

=== Early era (1990–1999) ===
In 1990, the Scottish and Northern Irish branches left the UK Greens to form separate parties. The English and Welsh parties became the Green Party of England and Wales, with the Welsh branch being autonomous.

In 1991, Marcus Hughes and Brian Stringer were elected to represent the Bynea and Dafen wards on Llanelli Borough Council In 1995, both then stood unsuccessfully as 'Independent Green' candidates, losing their seats to Labour on the new Carmarthenshire County Council. In 1993, the Party won a county council seat on Anglesey (Ynys Môn) after a sitting councillor in the Aethwy ward had joined the Greens, but the Party did not defend this seat or stand any other candidates at the 1995 Isle of Anglesey County Council election two years later.

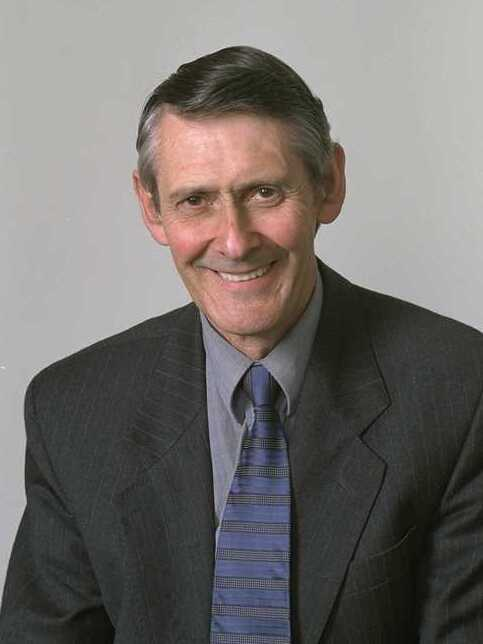
Cynog Dafis, elected as MP on a joint Plaid Cymru-Wales Green Party ticket

As pro-environmental positions became more prominent in Plaid Cymru, both Plaid Cymru and the Wales Green Party began exploring the prospects of greater co-operation with each other. At a conference in Denbigh, Plaid Cymru invited representatives from the Wales Green Party to discuss potential common ground between the two parties, with a similar event being held in Cardiff the following year.

For the 1992 general election, the local Greens entered an electoral alliance with Plaid Cymru in the constituency of Ceredigion and Pembroke North. The electoral alliance had begun by a joint policy document drafted in 1991, and agreed following both the constituency Green branch and constituency Plaid Cymru branch's members voted to approve the alliance. The alliance was successful with Cynog Dafis being returned in a surprise result as the MP, defeating the Liberal Democrat incumbent by over 3,000 votes.

Official cooperation between the two parties began to break down by 1995 due to policy disagreements, and disagreements within the Welsh Green Party over endorsing another party's candidate. Despite this there were still some joint candidates in the 1995 UK local elections. Dafis would go on to serve in parliament as a Plaid Cymru member until 2000, and in the National Assembly for Wales from 1999 until 2003. Dafis later stated that he did not consider himself to be the "first Green MP".

On 29 August 1997, the Wales Green Party issued a joint declaration with the Liberal Democrats and Plaid Cymru, supporting the 'Yes for Wales' campaign and the establishment of a new National Assembly for Wales in the 1997 Welsh devolution referendum.

=== Devolution era (1999–present) ===
In the 1999 Welsh local elections, Klaus Armstrong-Braun became the first Green Party councillor to be elected to one of Wales' twenty two unitary councils, winning a seat on Flintshire County Council. In 2006, the party elected Ann Were as party leader, the first female leader of a Welsh political party.

In 2010, the party became the only Green party within the United Kingdom to have not elected a Green candidate to a UK or devolved legislature, after Caroline Lucas was elected to the UK Parliament. In 2011, the Green Party campaigned in support of a yes vote in the 2011 Welsh devolution referendum. In 2013, the Wales Green Party archive at the National Library was damaged in a fire with some historical material either destroyed or permanently damaged.

In 2015, the Party agreed to support as many powers for Wales as possible, 'up to and including independence'. In the 2017 Welsh local elections, the Wales Green Party had their first county councillor elected to Powys County Council, for the Llangors ward.

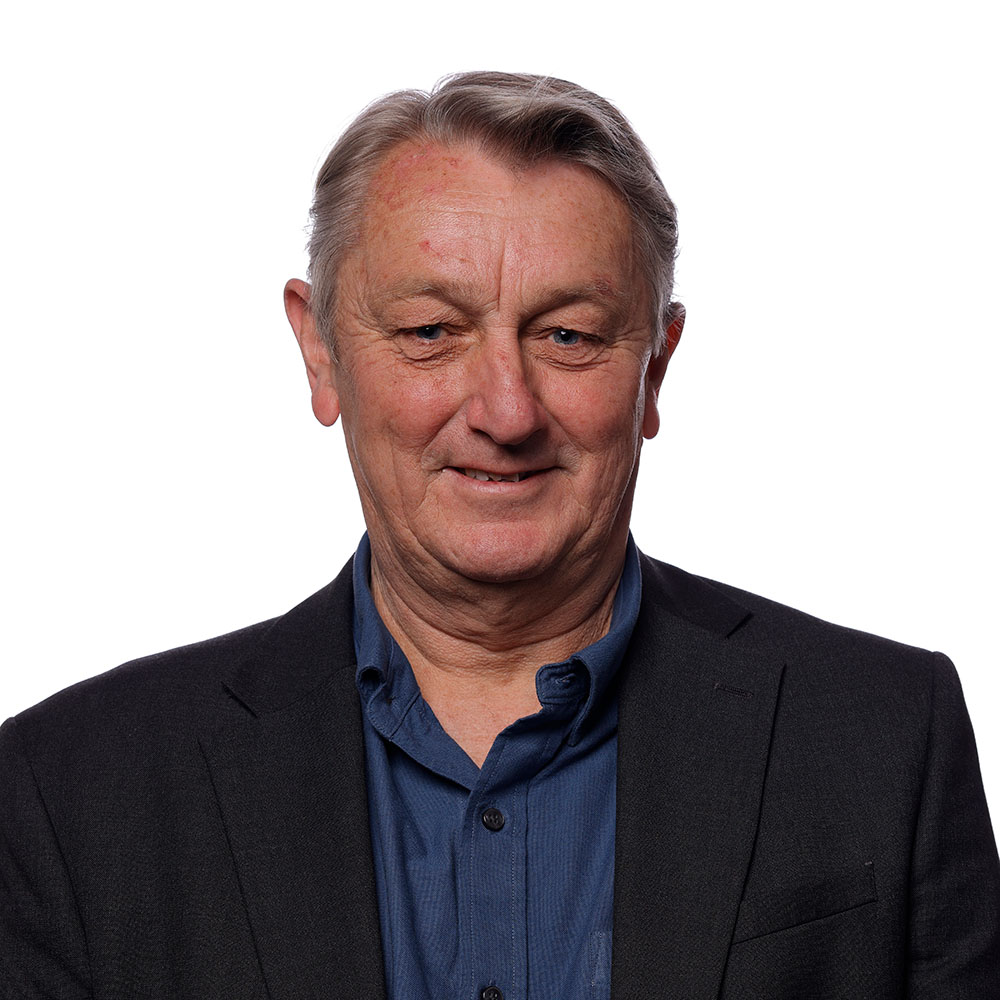
Anthony Slaughter has led the Wales Green Party since December 2018

In July 2018, the party held a vote on whether to split from the GPEW to form a separate organisation. Of those members who voted, 65% voted against the proposal, despite the leader Grenville Ham campaigning for independence. In October 2020, party members voted that they would campaign to support Welsh independence if a referendum was called on the matter, with party leader Anthony Slaughter arguing that many green policies could not be implemented in Wales without further devolved powers or independence.

In September 2021, Matt Townsend called for the party to become independent from its Westminster counterpart, despite members voting against it three years earlier. Writing in Bright Green, Townsend pointed out that the Scottish and Northern Irish Green parties were both independent from the GPEW. "This has left Wales as one of very few nations around the world to not have its own Green Party," he said. Townsend also noted that whilst the Scottish Greens had now entered government with the SNP, the Wales Green Party failed to win any seats at the 2021 Senedd election. Slaughter told Nation.Cymru in August 2023 that, with the expansion of the Senedd in 2026, he expected Green MSs to be elected for the first time.

In their manifesto for the 2024 United Kingdom general election, the party committed itself to Welsh independence, and would first seek for the Senedd to have equal powers to the Scottish Parliament as a first step. In September 2024, the party said that the steel industry should be publicly owned.

Paul Rock and Anthony Slaughter were elected in the 2026 Senedd election as the first MSs from the Green Party.

At their 2026 Conference in November, members will vote on becoming independent from the Green Party of England and Wales by 2034. A leadership election is scheduled for December 2026.

== Policies ==
While associated mainly with environmentalist policies, the party has a history of support for communitarian economic policies, including well-funded, locally controlled public services within the confines of a steady-state economy. It is supportive of proportional representation voting systems and takes a progressive approach to social policies, including supporting a universal basic income and transitioning to a four day working week. It also supports the devolution of further powers to Wales. In October 2020, the party announced that it would campaign for Welsh independence should a referendum be held. In their manifesto for the 2024 United Kingdom general election, the party later committed itself to Welsh independence in general.

The party emphasises expanding localised renewable energy projects. Other policies within its Policies for a Sustainable Society in Wales include: phasing out waste incineration, improving public transport and supporting new safe standing areas in Welsh sports stadiums. Furthermore, included within the party's policies is the commitment to "bring the rail system, including track and operators, back into public ownership". The party also supports bringing Welsh Water into public ownership.

The Wales Green Party supports free bus travel for those who are under 22-years-old and £1 bus fares for those aged 22 to 59 years old.

The party is in favour of universal free school meals, both during school term time and during school holidays. The party also backs ending the two child benefits cap.

The Wales Green Party wants to raise Universal Credit by £40 per week, increase Pension Credit and provide an immediate uplift in disability benefits by 5%. The party also supports increasing the minimum wage to £15 an hour, with the cost to small businesses offset by reducing their national insurance.

In terms of state funding, the party is in favour of a yearly 1% tax on assets above £10 million and a 2% yearly tax on assets above £1 billion. It would also scrap the upper earnings limit so that high income earners pay more national insurance. Furthermore, the party would reform taxes on taxable gains from capital so that it equates to taxes earned from income. Another state revenue source it would seek is a £120 carbon tax per tonne of emitted carbon, as well as carbon taxing fossil fuel imports and fossil fuel extractions. The party also wants to establish a Green Transformation Fund for Wales, which it says will "raise investment, develop infrastructure and generate long-term returns through leases, rents and power purchase agreements". Another aspect of its transformation plans is through the issuance of Transformation Bonds, in which citizens would be able to invest directly in Wales's transition to a greener economy. The party would also introduce a vacant land tax for unused land with planning permission.

The party supports the creation of a free at the point of use National Care Service.

== Elected representatives ==
=== Senedd ===
Name	Constituency	Time in office
Paul Rock	Caerdydd Ffynnon Taf	2026–present
Anthony Slaughter	Caerdydd Penarth	2026–present

== Election results ==
=== House of Commons ===
Election	Wales			
Election	Seats contested	Votes	%	Seats
1992^{[a]}	11	5,273		0 / 38
1997	4	1,718	0.1%	0 / 40
2001	6	3,753	0.3%	0 / 40
2005	11	7,144	0.5%	0 / 40
2010	13	6,293	0.4%	0 / 40
2015^{[b]}	35	38,344	2.6%	0 / 40
2017	11	5,128	0.3%	0 / 40
2019^{[c]}	18	15,828	1.0%	0 / 40
2024^{[d]}	32	61,662	4.7%	0 / 32

^{a} Seats contested exclude joint Plaid Cymru - Green candidates. Three joint candidates are referenced on the UK Parliament website, whilst five (Ceredigion and Pembroke North, Islwyn, Monmouth, Newport West & Torfaen) are recorded on Wikipedia. Cynog Dafis was elected in the Ceredigion and Pembroke North constituency.
^{b} The party retained deposits for the first time: in Ceredigion, Cardiff Central and Swansea West.
^{c} The Vale of Glamorgan seat was contested as part of the Remain Alliance.
^{d} Best result to date. First time contested every constituency in Wales. 9 out of 32 deposits retained. Outperformed Northern Irish (1.1%) and Scottish Greens (3.8%) on vote share, with lower vote share than English Greens (7.3%).

=== Senedd ===
Election	Constituency			Regional		Votes	%	Total seats	Position	Government
Election	Votes	%	Seats contested	Votes	%	Votes	%	Total seats	Position	Government
1999^{[a]}	1,002	0.1%	1/40	25,858	3.6%			0 / 60	5th	Extraparliamentary
2003	—N/a	—N/a	—N/a	30,028	3.5%			0 / 60	5th	Extraparliamentary
2007	—N/a	—N/a	—N/a	33,803	3.5%			0 / 60	7th	Extraparliamentary
2011^{[b]}	1,514	0.2%	1/40	32,649	3.4%			0 / 60	6th	Extraparliamentary
2016^{[c]}	25,202	2.5%	36/40	30,211	3.0%			0 / 60	7th	Extraparliamentary
2021^{[d]}	17,817	1.6%	13/40	48,714	4.4%			0 / 60	5th	Extraparliamentary
2026^{[e]}						84,608	6.7	2 / 96	5th	Opposition

^{a} First election to the Senedd, initially known as the National Assembly for Wales. Only Green candidate was in the Ceredigion constituency.
^{b} Only Green candidate was in the Ceredigion constituency.
^{c} The party's highest number of constituency votes in a Welsh general election to date.
^{d} The Greens received more regional votes than the Liberal Democrats, but finished one place lower in fifth position after that party won a Mid and West Wales regional list seat.
^{e} Starting with the 2026 election, the Senedd was increased to 96 members who are all elected through closed list proportional representation (using the D'Hondt method) in sixteen six-member constituencies.

=== Local elections ===
Election	Wales^{[a]}			
Election	Votes	%	Seats	Seats contested
1991^{[b]}	10,804	1.2%	2 / 1,364	31
1993^{[c]}	4,078	0.6%	1 / 502	31
1995^{[d]}	10,161	1.1%	0 / 1,272	57
1999^{[e]}	8,328	0.8%	1 / 1,270	31
2004	10,799	1.2%	0 / 1,263	65
2008	6,568	0.7%	0 / 1,270	37
2012^{[f]}	10,310	1.2%	0 / 1,235	68
2017^{[g]}	12,441	1.3%	1 / 1,271	79
2022^{[h]}	22,193	2.3%	8 / 1,231	117

^{a} Figures do not include community or town councils.
^{b} Two councillors elected to Llanelli Borough Council (Bynea and Dafen wards). Last election to 37 district councils before 22 new unitary councils were established.
^{c} Councillor elected to Gwynedd County Council (Aethwy ward, Anglesey), with a new high of three councillors across Wales. Last election to eight county councils before 22 new unitary councils established.
^{d} First elections to 22 new councils under Local Government (Wales) Act 1994. No Greens elected.
^{e} First councillor elected to Flintshire County Council (Saltney Stonebridge ward).
^{f} Results include 21 out of 22 councils. No Green candidates stood for the 30 seats in the delayed 2013 Isle of Anglesey County Council election.
^{g} First seat won on Powys County Council (Llangors ward).
^{h} The party's highest number of votes, candidates and seats in a Welsh local election. First councillors elected to six councils: Denbighshire, Monmouthshire, Neath Port Talbot, Swansea, Newport and Conwy.

=== European Parliament ===
Election	Wales		
Election	Votes	%	Seats
1994^{[a]}	19,413	2.0%	0 / 5
1999	16,146	2.6%	0 / 5
2004	32,761	3.6%	0 / 4
2009	38,160	5.6%	0 / 4
2014	33,275	4.5%	0 / 4
2019^{[b]}	52,660	6.3%	0 / 4

^{a} First election contested by the Green Party of England and Wales. Result reversed gains from the 1989 election (11.1% and 99,546 votes).
^{b} Last election before Wales left the European Union.

== Election campaigns ==
=== House of Commons ===
==== 2019 ====
The Wales Green Party entered an electoral pact in eleven Welsh seats with Plaid Cymru and the Welsh Liberal Democrats, as part of the Remain Alliance. As a result of this agreement, the party did not contest ten Welsh seats and instead supported pro-European Plaid Cymru or Liberal Democrat candidates. In the Vale of Glamorgan constituency, Anthony Slaughter stood for the Green Party as the Remain Alliance candidate but was not elected. The 2019 manifesto was titled If not now, when? and included various commitments, including taxing frequent flyers, creating more energy-efficient homes, decommissioning North Sea oil rigs and phasing out the UK's coal industry.

No.	Constituency	Votes	%	Change % ±
1	Vale of Glamorgan	3,251	5.9	▲5.1
2	Monmouth	1,353	2.7	▲0.8
3	Cardiff West	1,133	2.5	NA
4	Cardiff South and Penarth	1,182	2.3	▲1.3
5	Torfaen	812	2.2	NA
6	Newport West	902	2.1	▲1.0
7	Neath	728	2.0	NA
8	Bridgend	815	1.9	NA
8	Islwyn	669	1.9	NA
10	Ogmore	621	1.8	NA
11	Ceredigion	663	1.7	▲0.3
11	Swansea East	583	1.7	▲0.7
13	Cardiff North	820	1.6	NA
13	Newport East	577	1.6	NA
15	Rhondda	438	1.5	NA
16	Aberavon	450	1.4	NA
17	Wrexham	445	1.3	NA
17	Blaenau Gwent	386	1.3	NA

==== 2017 ====
No.	Constituency	Votes	%	Change % ±
1	Monmouth	954	1.9	▼1.5
2	Montgomeryshire	524	1.5	▼2.2
3	Ceredigion	542	1.4	▼4.2
4	Swansea West	434	1.2	▼3.9
5	Newport West	497	1.1	▼2.1
6	Caerphilly	447	1.1	▼1.2
7	Cardiff South and Penarth	532	1.0	▼2.7
8	Cardiff Central	420	1.0	▼5.4
9	Swansea East	359	1.0	NA
10	Vale of Glamorgan	419	0.8	▼1.3
11	Cardiff North	362	0.8	NA

==== 2015 ====
The Wales Green Party fielded their highest number of UK general election candidates and achieved their best UK election result in Wales.

No.	Constituency	Votes	%	Change % ±
1	Cardiff Central	2,461	6.4	▲4.8
2	Ceredigion	2,088	5.6	▲3.8
3	Swansea West	1,784	5.1	▲4.0
4	Cardiff West	1,704	3.9	▲2.1
5	Cardiff South and Penarth	1,746	3.7	▲2.5
5	Montgomeryshire	1,260	3.7	NA
7	Preseli Pembrokeshire	1,452	3.6	NA
8	Monmouth	1,629	3.4	▲2.1
8	Dwyfor Meirionnydd	981	3.4	NA
10	Carmarthen West and South Pembrokeshire	1,290	3.2	NA
10	Newport West	1,272	3.2	▲2.1
10	Neath	1,185	3.2	NA
13	Brecon and Radnorshire	1,261	3.1	▲2.2
14	Carmarthen East and Dinefwr	1,091	2.8	NA
15	Gower	1,161	2.7	NA
16	Pontypridd	992	2.6	▲1.6
16	Clwyd South	915	2.6	NA
16	Cynon Valley	799	2.6	NA
19	Cardiff North	1,254	2.5	▲1.7
19	Newport East	887	2.5	NA
21	Alyn and Deeside	976	2.4	NA
21	Aberconwy	727	2.4	NA
23	Caerphilly	937	2.3	NA
23	Blaenau Gwent	738	2.3	NA
23	Aberavon	711	2.3	NA
26	Vale of Glamorgan	1,054	2.1	▲1.1
26	Ogmore	754	2.1	NA
28	Wrexham	669	2.0	NA
28	Torfaen	746	2.0	▲0.8
30	Islwyn	659	1.9	NA
30	Bridgend	736	1.9	NA
32	Llanelli	689	1.8	NA
32	Delyn	680	1.8	NA
32	Merthyr Tydfil and Rhymney	603	1.8	NA
35	Rhondda	453	1.4	NA

=== Senedd ===
==== 2021 ====
The Green Party stood a full set of regional list candidates as well as thirteen constituency candidates in the 2021 Senedd election.

Some of the party's key policies for the 2021 Senedd election included: ending fees for people's first university degree, targeting Wales to be carbon net zero by 2030 by replacing fossil fuels with onshore and offshore renewable energy, and introducing free public transport for local journeys for people in Wales aged under 21. The party also said it would build 12,000 homes to the highest environmental standards and would start a transformation fund to invest in local communities and create thousands of green jobs.

During the campaign, it was initially announced the party would be excluded from taking part in the BBC One Wales leaders debate scheduled for 29 April 2021. However, BBC Wales later announced that a revised format would allow the party to participate in the second half of the TV debate.

Regional list

Region	Number of votes	Proportion of votes	Change	Candidates
Mid and West Wales	10,545	4.4%	▲0.6%	Emily Durrant, Tomos Barlow, Harry Hayfield, Marc Pearton-Scale
North Wales	6,586	2.9%	▲0.6%	Iolo Jones, Duncan Rees, Adam Turner, Linda Rogers
South Wales Central	14,478	5.7%	▲2.3%	Anthony Slaughter, Helen Westhead, David Griffin, Debra Cooper
South Wales East	9,950	4.8%	▲2.3%	Amelia Womack, Ian Chandler, Lauren James, Stephen Priestnall
South Wales West	7,155	3.9%	▲1.3%	Megan Poppy Lloyd, Chris Evans, Alex Harris, Tom Muller

Constituencies

No.	Constituency	Votes	%	Change % ±
1	Monmouth	2,000	5.6	▲2.7
2	Cardiff Central	1,552	5.4	▲1.0
3	Cardiff North	1,957	4.8	▲2.6
4	Brecon and Radnorshire	1,556	4.8	▲2.5
5	Swansea West	1,109	4.6	▲0.6
6	Cardiff South and Penarth	1,643	4.5	▲0.3
7	Ceredigion	1,356	4.4	▲0.3
8	Newport West	1,314	4.4	▲1.5
9	Neath	1,038	3.8	▲1.5
10	Cardiff West	1,287	3.5	▲0.3
11	Gower	1,088	3.3	▲0.9
12	Vale of Glamorgan	1,262	2.9	▲0.8
13	Pontypridd	655	2.4	▲0.4

==== 2016 ====
In September 2015, Amelia Womack, Deputy Leader of GPEW, announced her intention to stand in the National Assembly elections for Wales Green Party. An ITV article titled "Green deputy leader wants to switch to Welsh politics" wrote of Newport-born Womack's intention to stand in the Welsh elections saying; "She's seeking the nomination for the Cardiff Central constituency and – more significantly – hoping to be top of the Wales Green Party's regional list for South Wales Central." Notably, the article went on to say "Opinion polls have occasionally suggested that the Greens could gain a list seat in the Senedd".

On 10 February 2016, Welsh Greens abandoned progressive alliance negotiations a few months before the Senedd elections. The manifesto included plans to scrap the M4 relief road, build 12,000 new homes a year and provide free childcare to every child in Wales.

Regional list

Region	Number of votes	Proportion of votes	Change	Candidates
Mid and West Wales	8,222	3.8%	▼0.3%	Alice Hooker Stroud, Grenville Ham, Pippa Pemberton, Frances Bryant, Brian Dafydd Williams
North Wales	4,789	2.3%	Steady	Duncan Rees, Martin Bennewith, Petra Haig, Gerry Wolff
South Wales Central	7,949	3.4%	▼1.8%	Amelia Womack, Anthony Slaughter, Hannah Pudner, Chris von Ruhland
South Wales East	4,831	2.5%	▼0.2%	Pippa Bartolotti, Ann Were, Chris Were, Katy Beddoe, Andrew Creak
South Wales West	4,420	2.6%	Steady	Lisa Rapado, Charlotte Barlow, Laurence Brophy, Mike Whittall, Russell Kennedy, Thomas Muller

Constituencies

No.	Constituency	Votes	%	Change % ±
1	Cardiff Central	1,158	4.4	NA
2	Cardiff South and Penarth	1,268	4.2	NA
3	Ceredigion	1,223	4.1	▼1.1
3	Preseli Pembrokeshire	1,161	4.1	NA
5	Swansea West	883	4.0	NA
6	Montgomeryshire	932	3.9	NA
7	Dwyfor Meirionnydd	743	3.7	NA
8	Cardiff West	1,032	3.2	NA
9	Aberconwy	680	3.1	NA
9	Cynon Valley	598	3.1	NA
11	Torfaen	681	3.0	NA
12	Monmouth	910	2.9	NA
12	Newport West	814	2.9	NA
14	Caerphilly	770	2.8	NA
15	Carmarthen West and South Pembrokeshirre	804	2.7	NA
15	Carmarthen East and Dinefwr	797	2.7	NA
15	Islwyn	592	2.7	NA
18	Swansea East	529	2.6	NA
19	Gower	737	2.4	NA
19	Alyn and Deeside	527	2.4	NA
19	Newport East	491	2.4	NA
22	Brecon and Radnorshire	697	2.3	NA
22	Neath	589	2.3	NA
22	Merthyr Tydfil	469	2.3	NA
25	Cardiff North	824	2.2	NA
25	Clwyd West	565	2.2	NA
25	Ogmore	516	2.2	NA
28	Vale of Glamorgan	794	2.1	NA
28	Bridgend	567	2.1	NA
28	Clwyd South	474	2.1	NA
31	Pontypridd	508	2.0	NA
31	Wrexham	411	2.0	NA
33	Aberavon	389	1.9	NA
34	Llanelli	427	1.5	NA
34	Ynys Mon	389	1.5	NA
36	Rhondda	259	1.1	NA
37	Arfon	DNS		
38	Blaenau Gwent	DNS		
39	Delyn	DNS		
40	Vale of Clwyd	DNS		

^{A} DNS = Did not stand.

==== 2011 ====
The Wales Green Party again fielded candidates in all 5 top-up regions for the 2011 election. For the first time since 1999, the Greens also stood in a constituency - they once again opted to stand in Ceredigion.

During the 2011 campaign, they specifically targeted Labour voters with the aim of persuading them to use their regional list vote for the Greens, using the slogan "2nd vote Green". They claimed that Labour list votes were "wasted" and that over 70,000 votes in South Wales Central went "in the bin at every election" as Labour had never won a top-up seat in that region.

On this occasion, South Wales Central was the region the party targeted. The region includes Cardiff, with its large student population, and also the constituency of Cardiff Central, the only Liberal Democrat-Labour marginal seat in Wales. Welsh Green leader and South Wales Central candidate Jake Griffiths stated they were also aiming to attract disaffected Liberal Democrat voters in the region.

The Greens polled 32,649 votes, 3.4% of the total votes cast for the regional lists. In South Wales Central, they took over 10,000 votes, 5.2% of the total, though they were still almost 6,000 votes away from winning a seat. The regional results were as follows:

Region	Number of Votes	Proportion of Votes	Change	Candidates
Mid and West Wales	8,660	4.1%	▲0.1%	Leila Kiersch, Marilyn Elson
North Wales	4,406	2.3%	▼0.6%	Dorienne Robinson, Timothy Foster, Peter Haig
South Wales Central	10,774	5.2%	▲1.4%	Jake Griffiths, Sam Coates, John Matthews, Matt Townsend, Teleri Clark
South Wales East	4,857	2.7%	▼0.2%	Chris Were, Pippa Bartolotti, Owen Clarke, Alyson Ayland, Alan Williams
South Wales West	3,952	2.6%	▼1.2%	Keith Ross, Huw Evans, Andy Chyba, Delyth Miller

In Ceredigion, Chris Simpson polled 1,514 votes, or 5.2%. He came fifth out of five candidates.

==== 2007 ====
In 2007, the party again fielded a list of candidates in each of the top-up regions but no candidates for the constituencies. The Wales Green Party proposed that Wales should "be at the forefront of....a green industrial revolution". The party targeted South Wales West - the region where they had performed best in 2003.

The Welsh Greens polled 33,803 votes, or 3.5% of the total, a slight decrease on 2003. The party failed to win any seats, with their best performance this time being Mid and West Wales with 4.0% of the vote. In South Wales West their vote declined by one percentage point, their worst result of the five regions.

Region	Number of Votes	Proportion of Votes	Change	Candidates
Mid and West Wales	8,768	4.0%	▼0.1%	Leila Kiersch, Moth Foster, Marilyn Elson, John Jennings
North Wales	5,660	2.9%	▲0.4%	Jim Killock, Joe Blakesley, Maredudd ap Rheinallt, Wilf Hastings
South Wales Central	7,831	3.8%	▲0.4%	John Matthews, Richard Payne, David Pierce, Nigel Baker
South Wales East	5,414	2.8%	▼0.3%	Ann Were, Alasdair McGowen, Gerry Layton, Owen Clarke
South Wales West	6,130	3.8%	▼1.0%	Rhodri Griffiths, Brig Oubridge, Jane Richmond, Jonathan Spink

==== 2003 ====
In the 2003 election, the party again fielded a list of candidates for each of the electoral regions but this time stood no candidates for the constituencies. The Welsh Greens failed to win any seats, polling 30,028 votes, or 3.5%. Their best performance was in South Wales West where they polled 6,696 votes, or 4.8% of the total.

Region	Number of Votes	Proportion of Votes	Change	Candidates
Mid and West Wales	7,794	4.2%	▲0.7%	Dorienne Robinson, Molly Scott Cato, Timothy Foster, Reg Taylor, Christopher Cato
North Wales	4,200	2.4%	▲0.2%	Klaus Armstrong-Brown, John Walker, Jeremy Hart, Wilfred Hastings, Gilly Boyd, Jim Killock
South Wales Central	6,047	3.3%	▲0.9%	John Matthews, Lynn Farr, Jan Tucker, Sylvia Latham, Paul Beswick
South Wales East	5,291	3.1%	▲1.1%	Peter Varley, Ann Were, Owen Clarke, Ernie Hamer, Gealdine Layton, Teresa Telfer, Matthew Wooton
South Wales West	6,696	4.8%	▲2.4%	Martin Shrewsbury, Jan Cliff, Rhodri Griffiths, Steve Clegg, Deborah James, Tony Young

==== 1999 ====
In the 1999 inaugural election for the National Assembly, the Welsh Greens stood candidates in all five electoral regions used to elect "top-up" members of the assembly. Additionally, one candidate stood for the constituency seat of Ceredigion. The party stated that they aimed to poll around 7% of the vote and win at least one top-up seat.

The Welsh Greens ultimately polled 25,858 votes in the regional lists, 2.5% of the total, and 1,002 constituency votes (3.1%) in Ceredigion. No Welsh Greens were elected.

Region	Number of Votes	Proportion of Votes	Candidates
Mid and West Wales	7,718	3.5%	Dave Bradney, Sarah Scott-Cato, Sue Walker, Timothy Shaw, Timothy Foster
North Wales	4,667	2.2%	Jim Killock, Christopher Busby, Robin Welch, Klaus Armstrong-Brown, Angela Loveridge, Alexandra Plows, Kathryn Turner, Gwilym Morus, Sarah Collick
South Wales Central	5,336	2.5%	Kevin Jakeway, John Matthews, Vivien Turner, Chris Von Ruhland
South Wales East	4,055	2.0%	Roger Coghill, Kevin Williams, Steve Ainley, Elaine Ross, Owen Clarke
South Wales West	4,082	2.4%	Graham Oubridge, Lee Turner, Janet Evans, Simon Phillips

=== Local elections ===
==== 2022 ====
The 2021 Welsh local elections were postponed until 2022 to avoid a clash with the 2021 Senedd election, with the future electoral cycle also changed from four to five years by the Welsh Government. The Wales Green Party formed an electoral pact with Plaid Cymru to fight seats in Cardiff.

The party won eight seats in the election, exceeding a previous high of three seats held in the early 1990s (prior to the two tier system of county and district councils being abolished and replaced by twenty two new unitary councils in 1995). A further two were elected via an alliance with Plaid Cymru in Cardiff.

==== 2017 ====
In the 2017 Welsh local elections, the Welsh Greens elected their first ever councillor. In 2021 Powys councillor Emily Durrant defected to Plaid Cymru.

== Representation groups ==
=== Wales Young Greens ===
Wales Young Greens (Welsh: Gwyrddion Ifanc Cymru) is a national youth and student group subdivision of the Young Greens of England and Wales.

The current co-chairs of the Young Greens of England and Wales are Callum Clafferty and Luanne Thornton.

=== Welsh Green Pride ===
Welsh Green Pride is the LGBTIQA+ Liberation group within the Wales Green Party. The group started a UK wide review of the discriminatory blood ban 'which excludes any LGBTIQ+ (Lesbian, Gay, Bisexual, Trans, Intersex & Queer) people who have had sexual relations in the past 12 months from donating blood'. The group ran a petition and later met with Mark Drakeford which resulted in a review later being produced, and in 2021 the legislation was changed to allow men who had sex with men to give blood.

== Works cited ==
- Spoon, Jae-Jae (2011). Political Survival of Small Parties in Europe. University of Michigan Press. doi:10.3998/mpub.3210669. ISBN 978-0-472-11790-1.
- McAllister, Laura (2001). Plaid Cymru: the emergence of a political party. Bridgend, Wales: Seren. pp. 179–180. ISBN 978-1-85411-310-8.
