= 3rd National Assembly for Wales =

3rd Assembly
←	2nd Assembly	4th Assembly	→
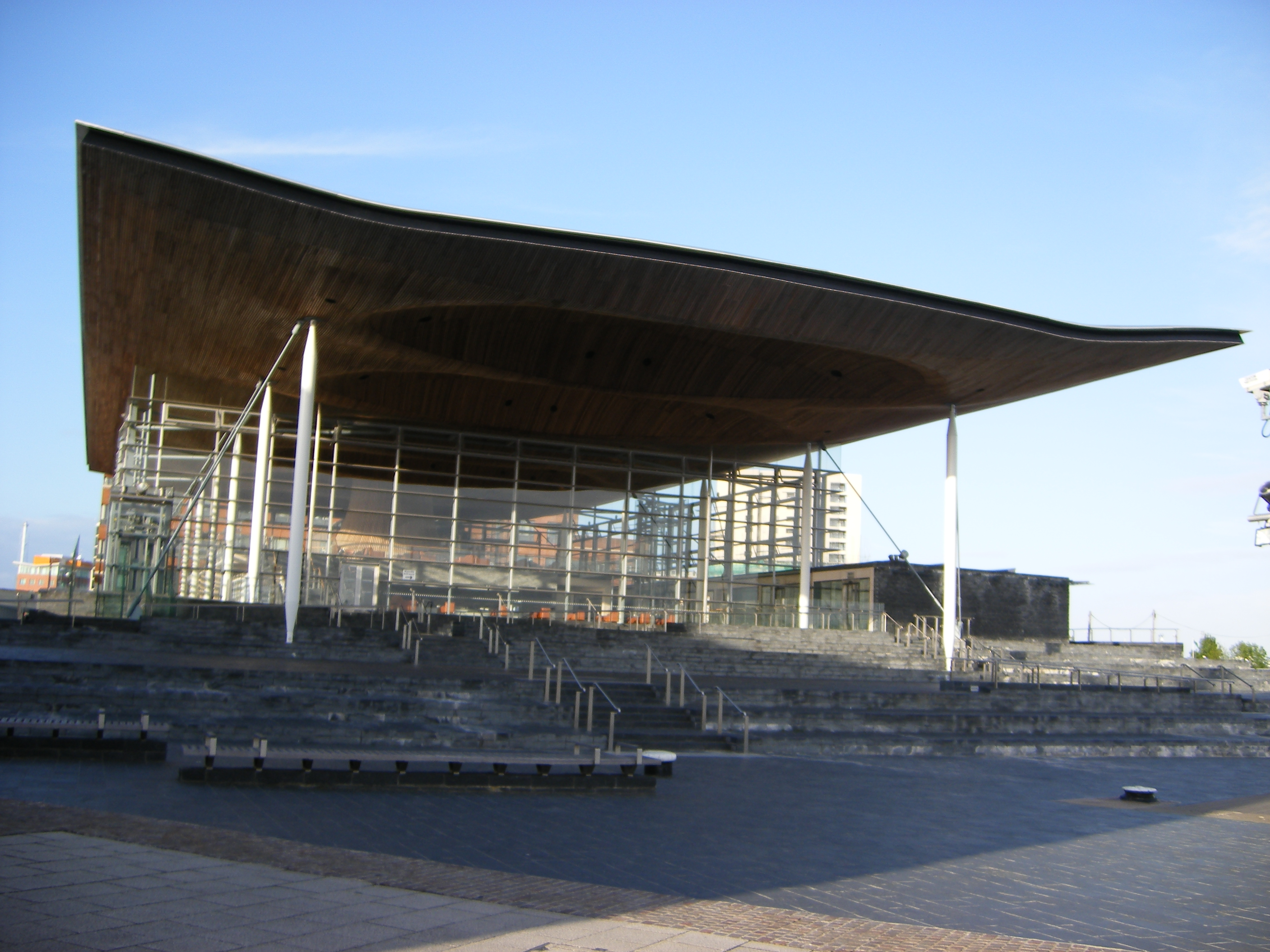
- The Welsh Assembly Building (Senedd) in 2008

Overview
- Legislative body: National Assembly for Wales
- Jurisdiction: Wales, United Kingdom
- Meeting place: Senedd building, Cardiff
- Term: 3 May 2007 – 5 May 2011
- Election: 2007 National Assembly for Wales election
- Government: Third Morgan government (2007); Fourth Morgan government (2007–09); First Jones government (2009–11)
- Members: 60
- Presiding Officer: Dafydd Elis-Thomas (2007–11)
- First Minister: Rhodri Morgan (2007–09); Carwyn Jones (2009–11)
- Deputy First Minister: Ieuan Wyn Jones (2007–11)

This is a list of Assembly Members (AMs; Welsh: Aelodau'r Cynulliad, ACau) elected to the third National Assembly for Wales at the 2007 election. There are a total of 60 members elected, 40 were elected from first past the post constituencies with a further 20 members being returned from five regions, each electing four AMs through mixed-member proportional representation.

== Composition of the Assembly ==
Party		May 2007	May 2011
•	Labour	26 (Note: Includes 6 MSs sponsored by the Co-operative Party, who are designated Labour and Co-operative.)	26
•	Plaid Cymru	15	14
	Conservative	12	13
	Liberal Democrats	6	6
	Independents	1	1
Total		60	

Government parties denoted with bullets (•)

== AMs by party ==
This is a list of AMs elected in 2011. The changes section below records all changes in party affiliation during the session. See here for a list of AMs elected in the 2007 election.

Party	Name	Constituency or region
Labour (26)	Leighton Andrews	Rhondda
Labour (26)	Lorraine Barrett	Cardiff South and Penarth
Labour (26)	Rosemary Butler	Newport West
Labour (26)	Christine Chapman	Cynon Valley
Labour (26)	Jeffrey Cuthbert	Caerphilly
Labour (26)	Jane Davidson	Pontypridd
Labour (26)	Alun Davies	Mid and West Wales
Labour (26)	Andrew Davies	Swansea West
Labour (26)	Brian Gibbons	Aberavon
Labour (26)	Janice Gregory	Ogmore
Labour (26)	John Griffiths	Newport East
Labour (26)	Lesley Griffiths	Wrexham
Labour (26)	Edwina Hart	Gower
Labour (26)	Jane Hutt	Vale of Glamorgan
Labour (26)	Irene James	Islwyn
Labour (26)	Ann Jones	Vale of Clwyd
Labour (26)	Carwyn Jones	Bridgend
Labour (26)	Huw Lewis	Merthyr Tydfil and Rhymney
Labour (26)	Val Lloyd	Swansea East
Labour (26)	Sandy Mewies	Delyn
Labour (26)	Rhodri Morgan	Cardiff West
Labour (26)	Lynne Neagle	Torfaen
Labour (26)	Carl Sargeant	Alyn and Deeside
Labour (26)	Karen Sinclair	Clwyd South
Labour (26)	Gwenda Thomas	Neath
Labour (26)	Joyce Watson	Mid and West Wales
Plaid Cymru (13)	Jocelyn Davies	South Wales East
Plaid Cymru (13)	Nerys Evans	Mid and West Wales
Plaid Cymru (13)	Chris Franks	South Wales Central
Plaid Cymru (13)	Bethan Jenkins	South Wales West
Plaid Cymru (13)	Alun Ffred Jones	Arfon
Plaid Cymru (13)	Elin Jones	Ceredigion
Plaid Cymru (13)	Gareth Jones	Aberconwy
Plaid Cymru (13)	Helen Mary Jones	Llanelli
Plaid Cymru (13)	Ieuan Wyn Jones	Ynys Môn
Plaid Cymru (13)	Dai Lloyd	South Wales West
Plaid Cymru (13)	Janet Ryder	North Wales
Plaid Cymru (13)	Rhodri Glyn Thomas	Carmarthen East and Dinefwr
Plaid Cymru (13)	Leanne Wood	South Wales Central
Conservative Party (13)	Mohammad Asghar	South Wales East
Conservative Party (13)	Nicholas Bourne	Mid and West Wales
Conservative Party (13)	Angela Burns	Carmarthen West and South Pembrokeshire
Conservative Party (13)	Alun Cairns	South Wales West
Conservative Party (13)	Andrew R. T. Davies	South Wales Central
Conservative Party (13)	Paul Davies	Preseli Pembrokeshire
Conservative Party (13)	William Graham	South Wales East
Conservative Party (13)	Mark Isherwood	North Wales
Conservative Party (13)	David Melding	South Wales Central
Conservative Party (13)	Darren Millar	Clwyd West
Conservative Party (13)	Jonathan Morgan	Cardiff North
Conservative Party (13)	Nick Ramsay	Monmouth
Conservative Party (13)	Brynle Williams	North Wales
Liberal Democrats (6)	Mick Bates	Montgomeryshire
Liberal Democrats (6)	Peter Black	South Wales West
Liberal Democrats (6)	Eleanor Burnham	North Wales
Liberal Democrats (6)	Veronica German	South Wales East
Liberal Democrats (6)	Jenny Randerson	Cardiff Central
Liberal Democrats (6)	Kirsty Williams	Brecon and Radnorshire
Independent (1)	Trish Law	Blaenau Gwent
Presiding Officer (1)	Dafydd Elis-Thomas	Dwyfor Meirionnydd

== Members by constituency and region ==
=== Constituency members ===
Assembly Member
Constituency	Name	Party
Aberavon	Brian Gibbons	Labour
Aberconwy	Gareth Jones	Plaid Cymru
Alyn and Deeside	Carl Sargeant	Labour
Arfon	Alun Ffred Jones	Plaid Cymru
Blaenau Gwent	Trish Law	Independent
Brecon and Radnorshire	Kirsty Williams	Liberal Democrats
Bridgend	Carwyn Jones	Labour
Caerphilly	Jeffrey Cuthbert	Labour
Cardiff Central	Jenny Randerson	Liberal Democrats
Cardiff North	Jonathan Morgan	Conservative
Cardiff South and Penarth	Lorraine Barrett	Labour Co-op
Cardiff West	Rhodri Morgan	Labour
Carmarthen East and Dinefwr	Rhodri Glyn Thomas	Plaid Cymru
Carmarthen West and South Pembrokeshire	Angela Burns	Conservative
Ceredigion	Elin Jones	Plaid Cymru
Clwyd South	Karen Sinclair	Labour
Clwyd West	Darren Millar	Conservative
Cynon Valley	Christine Chapman	Labour Co-op
Delyn	Sandy Mewies	Labour
Dwyfor Meirionnydd	Dafydd Elis-Thomas (Presiding Officer)	Plaid Cymru
Gower	Edwina Hart	Labour
Islwyn	Irene James	Labour
Llanelli	Helen Mary Jones	Plaid Cymru
Merthyr Tydfil and Rhymney	Huw Lewis	Labour Co-op
Monmouth	Nick Ramsay	Conservative
Montgomeryshire	Mick Bates	Liberal Democrats
Neath	Gwenda Thomas	Labour
Newport East	John Griffiths	Labour Co-op
Newport West	Rosemary Butler	Labour
Ogmore	Janice Gregory	Labour
Pontypridd	Jane Davidson	Labour
Preseli Pembrokeshire	Paul Davies	Conservative
Rhondda	Leighton Andrews	Labour
Swansea East	Val Lloyd	Labour
Swansea West	Andrew Davies	Labour
Torfaen	Lynne Neagle	Labour Co-op
Vale of Clwyd	Ann Jones	Labour
Vale of Glamorgan	Jane Hutt	Labour
Wrexham	Lesley Griffiths	Labour
Ynys Môn	Ieuan Wyn Jones	Plaid Cymru

=== Regional members ===
Assembly Member
Region	Name	Party
Mid and West Wales	Nick Bourne	Conservative
Mid and West Wales	Alun Davies	Labour Co-op
Mid and West Wales	Nerys Evans	Plaid Cymru
Mid and West Wales	Joyce Watson	Labour
North Wales	Eleanor Burnham	Liberal Democrats
North Wales	Mark Isherwood	Conservative
North Wales	Janet Ryder	Plaid Cymru
North Wales	Brynle Williams	Conservative
South Wales Central	Andrew R. T. Davies	Conservative
South Wales Central	Chris Franks	Plaid Cymru
South Wales Central	David Melding	Conservative
South Wales Central	Leanne Wood	Plaid Cymru
South Wales East	Mohammad Asghar	Conservative
South Wales East	Jocelyn Davies	Plaid Cymru
South Wales East	Michael German	Liberal Democrats
South Wales East	William Graham	Conservative
South Wales West	Peter Black	Liberal Democrats
South Wales West	Alun Cairns	Conservative
South Wales West	Bethan Jenkins	Plaid Cymru
South Wales West	Dai Lloyd	Plaid Cymru

== Changes ==
- 8 December 2009: Mohammad Asghar defected from Plaid Cymru to the Conservative Party.

== See also ==
- Government of the 3rd National Assembly for Wales
- 2007 National Assembly for Wales election
