= South Wales Central (Senedd electoral region) =

Senedd electoral region (1999–2026)

- Canol De Cymru (Welsh)
- Former Multi-member electoral region for the Senedd
- Map of South Wales Central, with constituencies numbered alphabetically. Inset within Wales shown to the top-right with the four regional seats.
Interactive map
Interactive map of the constituency.
- Preserved counties: Mid Glamorgan (part); South Glamorgan (part)

Former Multi-member electoral region
- Created: 1999
- Abolished: 2026
- Number of members: 12; 8 constituency; 4 regional
- MSs (last elected in 2021): Labour (8); Conservative (2); Plaid Cymru (2)
- Constituencies: 1. Cardiff Central; 2. Cardiff North; 3. Cardiff South and Penarth; 4. Cardiff West; 5. Cynon Valley; 6. Pontypridd; 7. Rhondda; 8. Vale of Glamorgan

South Wales Central (Welsh: Canol De Cymru) was an electoral region of the Senedd, consisting of eight constituencies. The region elected 12 members, eight directly elected constituency members and four additional members. The electoral region was first used in 1999, when the National Assembly for Wales was created.

Each constituency elected one Member of the Senedd (MSs) by the first past the post electoral system, and the region as a whole elected four additional or top-up MSs, to create a degree of proportional representation. The additional member seats were allocated from closed lists by the D'Hondt method, with constituency results reckoned as pre elected list members.

They were abolished ahead of the 2026 Senedd election.

== County boundaries ==
Map of the boundaries prior to abolition

The region covered much of the preserved county of Mid Glamorgan and much of the preserved county of South Glamorgan. The rest of Mid Glamorgan was partly within the South Wales East electoral region and partly within South Wales West. The rest of South Glamorgan was within the South Wales West electoral region.

== Electoral region profile ==
The region was predominantly urban, taking in Wales' capital and largest city, Cardiff, as well as the working-class former mining town of Pontypridd, the seaside resort of Barry, and parts of the formerly industrial and still heavily populated South Wales Valleys. However, the region also included rural areas in the western part of the Vale of Glamorgan.

== Constituencies ==
The eight constituencies had the names and boundaries of constituencies of the House of Commons of the Parliament of the United Kingdom (Westminster):

Constituency	2021 result	Preserved counties
Cardiff Central	Jenny Rathbone; Labour	Entirely within South Glamorgan
Cardiff North	Julie Morgan; Labour	Entirely within South Glamorgan
Cardiff South and Penarth	Vaughan Gething; Labour	Entirely within South Glamorgan
Cardiff West	Mark Drakeford; Labour	Entirely within South Glamorgan
Cynon Valley	Vikki Howells; Labour & Co-operative	Entirely within Mid Glamorgan
Pontypridd	Mick Antoniw; Labour	Partly Mid Glamorgan, partly South Glamorgan
Rhondda	Elizabeth Williams; Labour	Entirely within Mid Glamorgan
Vale of Glamorgan	Jane Hutt; Labour	Partly Mid Glamorgan, partly South Glamorgan

== Assembly members and Members of the Senedd ==
=== Constituency MSs ===
Term	Election	Cardiff Central	Cardiff North	Cardiff South and Penarth	Cardiff West	Cynon Valley	Pontypridd	Rhondda	Vale of Glamorgan
1st	1999	Jenny Randerson (LD)	Sue Essex (Lab)	Lorraine Barrett (Lab)	Rhodri Morgan (Lab)	Christine Chapman (Lab)	Jane Davidson (Lab)	Geraint Davies (PC)	Jane Hutt (Lab)
2nd	2003	Jenny Randerson (LD)	Sue Essex (Lab)	Lorraine Barrett (Lab)	Rhodri Morgan (Lab)	Christine Chapman (Lab)	Jane Davidson (Lab)	Leighton Andrews (Lab)	Jane Hutt (Lab)
3rd	2007	Jenny Randerson (LD)	Jonathan Morgan (Con)	Lorraine Barrett (Lab)	Rhodri Morgan (Lab)	Christine Chapman (Lab)	Jane Davidson (Lab)	Leighton Andrews (Lab)	Jane Hutt (Lab)
4th	2011	Jenny Rathbone (Lab)	Julie Morgan (Lab)	Vaughan Gething (Lab)	Mark Drakeford (Lab)	Christine Chapman (Lab)	Mick Antoniw (Lab)	Leighton Andrews (Lab)	Jane Hutt (Lab)
5th	2016	Jenny Rathbone (Lab)	Julie Morgan (Lab)	Vaughan Gething (Lab)	Mark Drakeford (Lab)	Vikki Howells (Lab)	Mick Antoniw (Lab)	Leanne Wood (PC)	Jane Hutt (Lab)
6th	2021	Jenny Rathbone (Lab)	Julie Morgan (Lab)	Vaughan Gething (Lab)	Mark Drakeford (Lab)	Vikki Howells (Lab)	Mick Antoniw (Lab)	Buffy Williams (Lab)	Jane Hutt (Lab)

=== Regional list AMs and MSs ===
N.B. This table is for presentation purposes only

Term	Election	AM / MS	AM / MS	AM / MS	AM / MS
1st	1999	Jonathan Morgan (Con)	David Melding (Con)	Owen John Thomas (PC)	Pauline Jarman (PC)
2nd	2003	Jonathan Morgan (Con)	David Melding (Con)	Owen John Thomas (PC)	Leanne Wood (PC)
3rd	2007	Andrew RT Davies (Con)	David Melding (Con)	Chris Franks (PC)	Leanne Wood (PC)
4th	2011	Andrew RT Davies (Con)	David Melding (Con)	Eluned Parrott (LD)	Leanne Wood (PC)
5th	2016	Andrew RT Davies (Con)	David Melding (Con)	Gareth Bennett (UKIP) later Independent then Abolish	Neil McEvoy (PC) later Independent then Propel
5th	2018	Andrew RT Davies (Con)	David Melding (Con)	Gareth Bennett (UKIP) later Independent then Abolish	Neil McEvoy (PC) later Independent then Propel
5th	2020	Andrew RT Davies (Con)	David Melding (Con)	Gareth Bennett (UKIP) later Independent then Abolish	Neil McEvoy (PC) later Independent then Propel
6th	2021	Andrew RT Davies (Con)	Joel James (Con)	Rhys ab Owen (PC later Independent)	Heledd Fychan (PC)
6th	2022	Andrew RT Davies (Con)	Joel James (Con)	Rhys ab Owen (PC later Independent)	Heledd Fychan (PC)

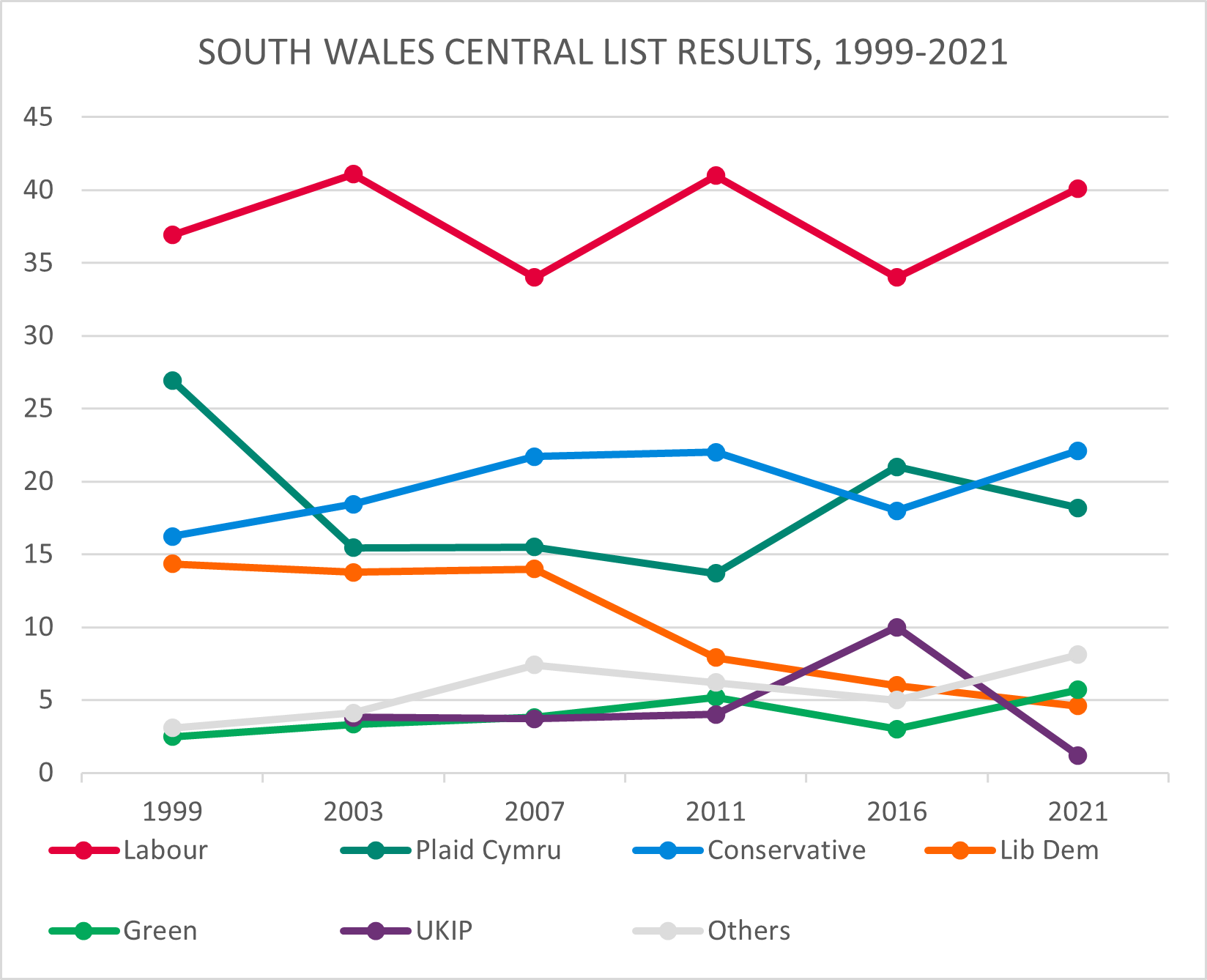
Election results since 1999 (parties who never got >5% counted as others)

=== 2021 Senedd election ===
2021 Senedd election: South Wales Central
List	Candidates	Votes	Of total (%)	± from prev.
Labour	Ruba Sivagnanam, Dan De'Ath, Maliika Kaaba, Owain Williams	102,611	40.1	▲6.2
Conservative	Andrew RT Davies, Joel James, Calum Davies, Adrian Robson, Mia Rhiannon Rees, Leighton Rowlands, Sean Driscoll, Sian-Elin Melbourne	56,662	22.1	▲3.8
Plaid Cymru	Rhys ab Owen, Heledd Fychan, Fflur Elin, Sahar al-Faifi, Boyd Clack, Nasir Adam, Julie Williams, Ioan Bellin, Mohammed Tariq Awan, Richard Rhys Grigg	46,478	18.2	▼2.7
Green	Anthony Slaughter, Helen Westhead, David Griffin, Debra Cooper	14,478	5.7	▲2.3
Liberal Democrats	Rodney Berman, Rhys Taylor, Sally Stephenson, Steven Rajam, Alex Wilson	11,821	4.6	▼1.7
Abolish	Lee Canning, Martyn Ford, Munawar Mughal, Lisa Peregrine, Stuart Fields, Ian McLean, Lawrence Gwynn, Michael Hughes	8,396	3.3	▼0.7
Propel	Neil McEvoy, Steve Robinson, Lisa Ford, Keith Parry	5,552	2.2	▲2.2
UKIP	Paul Campbell, Benjamin Dale, Clive Easton, Paul Williams	3,127	1.2	▼9.2
Reform	Jamie Jenkins, Peter Hopkins, Steve Bayliss, Michael Hancock, Alan Pick	2,244	0.9	▲0.9
No More Lockdowns	Justin Lilley, Rita Darby	1,298	0.5	▲0.5
Gwlad	Karl-James Langford, Clem Thomas, Angus Hawkins, Rosamund Ellis-Evans	1,098	0.4	▲0.4
Communist	Anita Wright, Malachi Kwame, Walusimbi-Kakembo	602	0.2	0.0
Independent	Alan Coulthard	580	0.2	▲0.2
TUSC	Ross Saunders, Beth Webster, Mia Hollsing, Andrew Wilkes, Kevin Gillen	519	0.2	▼0.1
Workers Party	Tess Delaney, Steve Everett, Frank Hinley	411	0.2	▲0.2

== 2021 Senedd election additional members ==
Party	Constituency seats	List votes (vote %)	D'Hondt entitlement	Additional members elected	Total members elected	Deviation from D'Hondt entitlement
Labour	8	102,611 (40%)	6	0	8	+2
Conservative	0	56,662 (22%)	3	2	2	-1
Plaid Cymru	0	46,478 (18%)	3	2	2	-1
Green	0	14,478 (6%)	0	0	0	0
Liberal Democrats	0	11,821 (5%)	0	0	0	0
Abolish	0	8,396 (3%)	0	0	0	0
Propel	0	5,552 (2%)	0	0	0	0
UKIP	0	3,127 (1%)	0	0	0	0
Reform	0	2,244 (1%)	0	0	0	0
No More Lockdowns	0	1.298 (1%)	0	0	0	0
Gwlad	0	1,098 (0%)	0	0	0	0
Communist	0	602 (0%)	0	0	0	0
Independent (Alan Coulthard)	0	580 (0%)	0	0	0	0
TUSC	0	519 (0%)	0	0	0	0
Workers Party	0	411 (0%)	0	0	0	0

=== Regional MSs elected in 2021 ===
Party	Name
Conservative	Andrew RT Davies
Plaid Cymru	Rhys ab Owen
Conservative	Joel James
Plaid Cymru	Heledd Fychan

== 2016 Welsh Assembly election additional members ==
Party	Constituency seats	List votes (vote %)	D'Hondt entitlement	Additional members elected	Total members elected	Deviation from D'Hondt entitlement
Labour	7	78,366 (34%)	5	0	7	+2
Plaid Cymru	1	48,357 (21%)	3	1	2	-1
Conservative	0	42,185 (18%)	3	2	2	-1
UKIP	0	23,958 (10%)	1	1	1	0
Liberal Democrats	0	14,875 (6%)	0	0	0	0
Abolish	0	9,163 (4%)	0	0	0	0
Green	0	7,949 (3%)	0	0	0	0
Women's Equality	0	2,807 (1%)	0	0	0	0
Monster Raving Loony	0	1,096 (0%)	0	0	0	0
TUSC	0	736 (0%)	0	0	0	0
Communist	0	520 (0%)	0	0	0	0
Freedom to Choose	0	470 (0.2%)	0	0	0	0

=== Regional AMs elected in 2016 ===
Party	Name
Conservative	Andrew RT Davies
Conservative	David Melding
Plaid Cymru	Neil McEvoy
UKIP	Gareth Bennett

== 2011 Welsh Assembly election additional members ==
Party	Constituency seats	List votes (vote %)	D'Hondt entitlement	Additional members elected	Total members elected	Deviation from D'Hondt entitlement
Labour	8	85,445 (41.0%)	6	0	8	+2
Conservative	0	45,751 (22.0%)	3	2	2	−1
Plaid Cymru	0	28,606 (13.7%)	2	1	1	−1
Liberal Democrats	0	16,514 (7.9%)	1	1	1	0
Green	0	10,774 (5.2%)	0	0	0	0
UKIP	0	8,292 (4.0%)	0	0	0	0
Socialist Labour	0	4,690 (2.3%)	0	0	0	0
BNP	0	3,805 (1.8%)	0	0	0	0
Welsh Christian	0	1,873 (0.9%)	0	0	0	0
Monster Raving Loony	0	1,237 (0.6%)	0	0	0	0
TUSC	0	830 (0.4%)	0	0	0	0
Communist	0	516 (0.2%)	0	0	0	0

=== Regional AMs elected in 2011 ===
Party	Name
Conservative	Andrew RT Davies
Conservative	David Melding
Liberal Democrats	Eluned Parrott †
Plaid Cymru	Leanne Wood

† Replaced John Dixon, who was disqualified for being a member of a public body to which AMs cannot belong.

== 2007 Welsh Assembly election additional members ==
Party	Constituency seats	List votes (vote %)	D'Hondt entitlement	Additional members elected	Total members elected	Deviation from D'Hondt entitlement
Labour	6	70,799 (34.0%)	5	0	6	+1
Conservative	1	45,127 (21.7%)	3	2	3	0
Plaid Cymru	0	32,207 (15.5%)	2	2	2	0
Liberal Democrats	1	29,626 (14.0%)	2	0	1	−1
BNP	0	7,889 (3.8%)	0	0	0	0
Green	0	7,831 (3.8%)	0	0	0	0
UKIP	0	7,645 (3.7%)	0	0	0	0
Welsh Christian	0	1,987 (1.0%)	0	0	0	0
Socialist Labour	0	1,744 (0.8%)	0	0	0	0
Respect	0	1,079 (0.5%)	0	0	0	0
Socialist	0	838 (0.4%)	0	0	0	0
Communist	0	817 (0.4%)	0	0	0	0
CPA	0	757 (0.4%)	0	0	0	0
Socialist Equality	0	292 (0.1%)	0	0	0	0

== 2003 Welsh Assembly election additional members ==
Party	Constituency seats	List votes (vote %)	D'Hondt entitlement	Additional members elected	Total members elected	Deviation from D'Hondt entitlement
Labour	7	74,369 (41.08%)	6	0	7	+1
Conservative	0	33,404 (18.45%)	2	2	2	0
Plaid Cymru	0	27,956 (15.44%)	2	2	2	0
Liberal Democrats	1	24,926 (13.77%)	2	0	1	-1
UKIP	0	6,920 (3.82%)	0	0	0	0
Green	0	6,047 (3.34%)	0	0	0	0
Socialist Labour	0	3,217 (1.78%)	0	0	0	0
New Millennium Bean Party	0	1,027 (0.57%)	0	0	0	0
Cymru Annibynnol	0	1,018 (0.56%)	0	0	0	0
Vote 2 Stop the War	0	1,013 (0.56%)	0	0	0	0
Communist	0	577 (0.32%)	0	0	0	0
ProLife Alliance	0	573 (0.32%)	0	0	0	0

== 1999 Welsh Assembly election additional members ==
Party	Constituency seats	List votes (vote %)	D'Hondt entitlement	Additional members elected	Total members elected	Deviation from D'Hondt entitlement
Labour	6	79,564 (36.92%)	5	0	6	+1
Plaid Cymru	1	58,080 (26.95%)	3	2	3	0
Conservative	0	34,944 (16.22%)	2	2	2	0
Liberal Democrats	1	30,911 (14.35%)	2	0	1	−1
Green	0	5,336 (2.48%)	0	0	0	0
Socialist Labour	0	2,822 (1.31%)	0	0	0	0
Independent- Alun Mathias	0	1,524 (0.71%)	0	0	0	0
Natural Law	0	665 (0.31%)	0	0	0	0
Communist	0	652 (0.30%)	0	0	0	0
Socialist Alliance	0	602 (0.28%)	0	0	0	0
Independent- Paul Phillips	0	378 (0.18%)	0	0	0	0
