= Cynon Valley (Senedd constituency) =

Senedd constituency (1999–2026)

Coordinates: 51.657°N 3.461°W

Cynon Valley Cwm Cynon
- Former Senedd county constituency for the Senedd

- Cynon Valley shown within the South Wales Central electoral region and the region shown within Wales

Former Senedd county constituency
- Created: 1999
- Abolished: 2026
- Party: Welsh Labour
- MS: Vikki Howells
- Preserved county: Mid Glamorgan

Cynon Valley (Welsh: Cwm Cynon) was a constituency of the Senedd. It elected one Member of the Senedd by the first past the post method of election. It was also one of eight constituencies in the South Wales Central electoral region, which elected four additional members, in addition to eight constituency members, to produce a degree of proportional representation for the region as a whole.

== Boundaries ==
Map of 1999–2026 boundaries

The constituency was created for the first election to the Assembly, in 1999, with the name and boundaries of the Cynon Valley Westminster constituency. It was entirely within the preserved county of Mid Glamorgan.

The other seven constituencies of the region were Cardiff Central, Cardiff North, Cardiff South and Penarth, Cardiff West, Pontypridd, Rhondda and Vale of Glamorgan.

== Voting ==
In general elections for the Senedd, each voter had two votes. The first vote was used to vote for a candidate to become the Member of the Senedd for the voter's constituency, elected by the first past the post system. The second vote was used to vote for a regional closed party list of candidates. Additional member seats were allocated from the lists by the d'Hondt method, with constituency results being taken into account in the allocation.

== Assembly members and Members of the Senedd ==
Election	Member	Party	Portrait
1999	Christine Chapman	Labour Co-operative	
2016	Vikki Howells	Labour	

== Elections ==
=== Elections in the 2020s ===
2021 Senedd election: Cynon Valley
Party	Candidate	Constituency			Regional		
Party	Candidate	Votes	%	±%	Votes	%	±%
Labour	Vikki Howells (Note: Incumbent member for this constituency)	11,427	55.3	+4.2	10,279	50.1	+7.0
Plaid Cymru	Geraint Benney	3,959	19.3	-0.6	3,935	19.2	-4.7
Conservative	Mia Rees	2,795	13.6	+7.5	3,220	15.7	+9.3
Propel	Vicky Jenkins	713	3.5	New	325	1.6	New
Abolish	Martyn Ford	648	3.2	New	660	3.2	-0.3
Reform UK	Peter Hopkins	356	1.7	New	284	1.4	New
Liberal Democrats	Gerald Francis	335	1.6	-0.1	324	1.6	-0.4
Independent	Gareth Bennett	278	1.4	New			
Green					625	3.0	+0.8
UKIP					352	1.7	-14.5
Gwlad					153	0.7	New
No More Lockdowns					121	0.6	New
Workers Party					64	0.3	New
TUSC					56	0.3	-0.1
Communist					53	0.3	-0.1
Independent Alan Coulthard					50	0.2	New
Majority		7,468	36.0	+4.8			
Turnout		20,511	39.05	+0.8			
Labour hold		Swing					

=== Elections in the 2010s ===
Welsh Assembly Election 2016: Cynon Valley
Party	Candidate	Constituency			Regional		
Party	Candidate	Votes	%	±%	Votes	%	±%
Labour	Vikki Howells	9,830	51.1	-10.9	8,295	43.1	-10.3
Plaid Cymru	Cerith Griffiths	3,836	19.9	-7.3	4,601	23.9	-0.6
UKIP	Liz Wilks	3,460	18.0	New	3,120	16.2	
Conservative	Lyn Hudson	1,177	6.1	-2.1	1,227	6.4	-1.2
Green	John Matthews	598	3.1	New	426	2.2	-1.1
Liberal Democrats	Michael Wallace	335	1.7	-0.9	385	2.0	-0.8
Abolish					670	3.5	New
Women's Equality					149	0.8	New
Monster Raving Loony					102	0.5	-0.1
TUSC					79	0.4	-0.1
Communist					70	0.4	+0.1
Freedom to Choose / Vapers in Power					56	0.3	New
Independent (Jonathan Bishop)					51	0.3	New
Majority		5,994	31.2	−3.6			
Turnout		19,236	38.2	+2.3			
Labour hold		Swing					

Welsh Assembly Election 2011: Cynon Valley
Party	Candidate	Constituency			Regional		
Party	Candidate	Votes	%	±%	Votes	%	±%
Labour Co-op	Christine Chapman	11,626	62.0	+5.3	9,730		
Plaid Cymru	Dafydd Trystan Davies	5,111	27.2	-0.6	4,254		
Conservative	Daniel Saxton	1,531	8.2	-2.2	1,378		
Liberal Democrats	Ian Walton	492	2.6	-2.5	507		
UKIP					73		-
Socialist Labour					781		
Green					609		
BNP					409		-
Welsh Christian					228		
Monster Raving Loony					104		New
TUSC					96		New
Communist					57		-
Majority		6,515	34.8	+5.9			
Turnout		18,760	35.9	−2.5			
Labour Co-op hold		Swing	+3.0				

Note: The Electoral Commission record the UKIP regional vote here as 73. That figure would be by far the lowest in Wales and not in keeping with historic figures here or equivalent figures elsewhere in the South Wales Valleys, South Wales Central and Wales at this election.
Regional ballots rejected at the count: 118

=== Elections in the 2000s ===
Welsh Assembly Election 2007: Cynon Valley
Party	Candidate	Constituency			Regional		
Party	Candidate	Votes	%	±%	Votes	%	±%
Labour Co-op	Christine Chapman	11,058	56.7	-8.3	10,036	50.6	-5.4
Plaid Cymru	Liz A. Walters	5,435	27.8	+6.5	4,214	21.3	+0.5
Conservative	Neill S.M. John	2,024	10.4	+3.8	1,401	7.1	-0.4
Liberal Democrats	Margaret H. Phelps	1,000	5.1	-2.5	1,232	6.2	+0.2
BNP					912	4.6	New
UKIP					769	3.9	±0.0
Green					528	2.7	-0.3
Welsh Christian					211	1.1	New
Socialist Labour					200	1.0	-2.1
Communist					89	0.4	+0.3
Socialist					84	0.4	New
Respect					68	0.3	New
CPA					39	0.2	New
Socialist Equality					36	0.2	New
Majority		5,623	28.9	−13.9			
Turnout		19,517	38.4	+1.2			
Labour Co-op hold		Swing	−7.2				

Welsh Assembly Election 2003: Cynon Valley
Party	Candidate	Constituency			Regional		
Party	Candidate	Votes	%	±%	Votes	%	±%
Labour Co-op	Christine Chapman	10,841	65.0	+19.4	9,329	56.1	+14.1
Plaid Cymru	David A. Walters	3,724	22.3	−20.2	3,454	20.8	-23.0
Liberal Democrats	Rob O. Humphreys	1,120	6.7	−0.4	1,238	7.4	+0.3
Conservative	Daniel C.B. Thomas	984	5.9	+1.1	1,001	6.0	+1.4
Socialist Labour					522	3.1	Unknown
Green					392	2.4	Unknown
UKIP					314	1.9	New
Cymru Annibynnol					123	0.7	New
New Millennium Bean Partyn					86	0.5	New
Communist					75	0.5	Unknown
Vote No 2 Stop the War					71	0.4	New
ProLife Alliance					31	0.2	New
Majority		7,117	42.7	+39.6			
Turnout		16,669	37.5	−8.1			
Labour Co-op hold		Swing	+19.8				

2003 Electorate: 44,473
Regional ballots rejected: 345

=== Elections in the 1990s ===
Welsh Assembly Election 1999: Cynon Valley
Party	Candidate	Constituency			Regional		
Party	Candidate	Votes	%	±%	Votes	%	±%
Labour Co-op	Christine Chapman	9,883	45.6	N/A	9,000	42.0	N/A
Plaid Cymru	Phil Richards	9,206	42.5	N/A	9,385	43.8	N/A
Liberal Democrats	Alison L. Willott	1,531	7.1	N/A	1,513	7.1	N/A
Conservative	Edmund R. Hayward	1,046	4.8	N/A	997	4.6	N/A
Others					554	2.6	N/A
Majority		932	3.1	N/A			
Turnout		21,666	45.6	N/A			
Labour Co-op win (new seat)							

1999 Electorate: 47,508
