= Cardiff South and Penarth =

Cardiff South and Penarth may refer to:

- Cardiff South and Penarth (UK Parliament constituency)
- Cardiff South and Penarth (Senedd constituency)
