= Rhondda (Senedd constituency) =

Senedd constituency (1999–2026)

Coordinates: 51.644°N 3.427°W

- Former Senedd county constituency for the Senedd

- Rhondda shown within the South Wales Central electoral region and the region shown within Wales

Former Senedd county constituency
- Created: 1999
- Abolished: 2026
- Party: Welsh Labour
- MS: Buffy Williams
- Preserved county: Mid Glamorgan; South Glamorgan

Rhondda was a constituency of the Senedd. It elected one Member of the Senedd by the first past the post method of election. Also, it was one of eight constituencies in the South Wales Central electoral region, which elected four additional members, in addition to eight constituency members, to produce a degree of proportional representation for the region as a whole.

== Boundaries ==
Map of 1999–2026 boundaries

The constituency was created for the first election to the Assembly, in 1999, with the name and boundaries of the Rhondda Westminster constituency. It was entirely within the preserved county of Mid Glamorgan.

The other seven constituencies of the region were Cardiff Central, Cardiff North, Cardiff South and Penarth, Cardiff West, Cynon Valley, Pontypridd and Vale of Glamorgan.

== Voting ==
In general elections for the Senedd, each voter had two votes. The first vote was used to vote for a candidate to become the Member of the Senedd for the voter's constituency, elected by the first past the post system. The second vote was used to vote for a regional closed party list of candidates. Additional member seats were allocated from the lists by the d'Hondt method, with constituency results being taken into account in the allocation.

== Assembly Members and Members of the Senedd ==
Election	Member	Party	Portrait
1999	Geraint Davies	Plaid Cymru	
2003	Leighton Andrews	Labour	
2016	Leanne Wood	Plaid Cymru	
2021	Buffy Williams	Labour	

== Elections ==
=== Elections in the 2020s ===
2021 Senedd election: Rhondda
Party	Candidate	Constituency			Regional		
Party	Candidate	Votes	%	±%	Votes	%	±%
Labour	Elizabeth Williams	12,832	54.7	+18.8	11,949	51.1	+18.7
Plaid Cymru	Leanne Wood (Note: Incumbent member for this constituency)	7,335	31.3	-19.3	6,495	27.8	-20.4
Conservative	Tom Parkhill	1,490	6.4	+4.2	2,058	8.8	+6.3
Propel	Jeff Gregory	525	2.2	New	288	1.2	New
Abolish	Ian McLean	430	1.8	New	648	2.8	+0.3
Reform	Steve Bayliss	355	1.5	New	306	1.3	New
Freedom Alliance	Steven Phillips	291	1.2	New			
Liberal Democrats	Jackie Charlton	200	0.9	+0.2	206	0.9	-0.3
Green					575	2.5	+1.0
UKIP					343	1.5	-8.4
No More Lockdowns					159	0.7	New
Gwlad					136	0.6	New
Communist					74	0.3	±0.0
TUSC					57	0.2	-0.1
Workers Party					49	0.2	New
Independent	Alan Coulthard				45	0.2	New
Majority		5,497	23.4	N/A			
Turnout		23,458					
Labour gain from Plaid Cymru		Swing	+19.1				

=== Elections in the 2010s ===
Welsh Assembly Election 2016: Rhondda
Party	Candidate	Constituency			Regional		
Party	Candidate	Votes	%	±%	Votes	%	±%
Plaid Cymru	Leanne Wood	11,891	50.6	+21.1	11,354	48.2	+23.7
Labour	Leighton Andrews	8,432	35.9	-27.3	7,623	32.4	-22.2
UKIP	Stephen Clee	2,203	9.4	New	2,337	9.9	+6.6
Conservative	Maria Hill	528	2.2	-2.6	582	2.5	-1.8
Green	Pat Matthews	259	1.1	New	346	1.5	-1.0
Liberal Democrats	Rhys Taylor	173	0.7	-1.8	278	1.2	-1.0
Abolish					591	2.5	New
Women's Equality					105	0.4	New
Monster Raving Loony					114	0.5	±0.0
Independent (Jonathan Bishop)					45	0.2	New
TUSC					82	0.3	-0.3
Communist					62	0.3	±0.0
Freedom to Choose / Vapers in Power					40	0.2	New
Majority		3,459	14.7	N/A			
Turnout		23,486	47.2	+9.2			
Plaid Cymru gain from Labour		Swing					

Welsh Assembly Election 2011: Rhondda
Party	Candidate	Constituency			Regional		
Party	Candidate	Votes	%	±%	Votes	%	±%
Labour	Leighton Andrews	12,650	63.2	+5.0	10,919	54.6	+1.7
Plaid Cymru	Sera Evans-Fear	5,911	29.5	-0.5	4,906	24.5	-1.0
Conservative	James Jeffreys	969	4.8	-0.3	861	4.3	-0.3
Liberal Democrats	George Summers	497	2.5	-4.0	436	2.2	-2.2
Socialist Labour					746	3.7	+2.3
UKIP					667	3.3	+0.7
Green					502	2.5	+0.4
BNP					476	2.4	-1.8
Welsh Christian					200	1.0	+0.1
TUSC					112	0.6	New
Monster Raving Loony					105	0.5	New
Communist					66	0.3	-0.5
Majority		6,739	33.7	+5.6			
Turnout		20,027	38.0	−4.1			
Labour hold		Swing	+2.8				

Regional ballots rejected at the count: 112

=== Elections in the 2000s ===
Welsh Assembly Election 2007: Rhondda
Party	Candidate	Constituency			Regional		
Party	Candidate	Votes	%	±%	Votes	%	±%
Labour	Leighton Andrews	12,875	58.2	-3.4	11,692	52.9	-7.1
Plaid Cymru	Jill Evans	6,660	30.1	+3.1	5,576	25.5	+2.8
Liberal Democrats	Karen Roberts	1,441	6.5	+3.5	964	4.4	-0.1
Conservative	Howard Parsons	1,131	5.1	+2.9	1,006	4.6	+1.0
BNP					922	4.2	New
UKIP					584	2.6	+0.1
Green					473	2.1	+0.3
Socialist Labour					307	1.4	-1.7
Welsh Christian					190	0.9	New
Communist					167	0.8	+0.4
Socialist					77	0.3	New
CPA					76	0.3	New
Respect					59	0.3	New
Socialist Equality					11	±0.0	New
Majority		6,215	28.1	−6.5			
Turnout		22,107	42.1	−3.5			
Labour hold		Swing	-3.3				

Welsh Assembly Election 2003: Rhondda
Party	Candidate	Constituency			Regional		
Party	Candidate	Votes	%	±%	Votes	%	±%
Labour	Leighton Andrews	14,170	61.6	+21.1	13,746	60.0	+19.8
Plaid Cymru	Geraint Rhys Davies	6,216	27.0	-21.7	5,204	22.7	-17.5
Independent	Jeffrey Gregory	909	4.0	New			
Liberal Democrats	Veronica Watkins	680	3.0	-1.7	1,023	4.5	-1.4
UKIP	Kunnathur T. Rajan	524	2.3	New	568	2.5	New
Conservative	Paul James Williams	504	2.2	-0.6	813	3.6	+0.7
Socialist Labour					710	3.1	Unknown
Green					407	1.8	Unknown
Cymru Annibynnol					164	0.7	New
Vote No 2 Stop the War					65	0.3	New
New Millennium Bean Partyn					88	0.4	New
Communist					91	0.4	Unknown
ProLife Alliance					19	0.1	New
Majority		7,954	34.6	N/A			
Turnout		23,003	45.6	−4.6			
Labour gain from Plaid Cymru		Swing	+21.4				

2003 Electorate: 50,463
Regional ballots rejected: 394

=== Elections in the 1990s ===
Welsh Assembly Election 1999: Rhondda
Party	Candidate	Constituency			List		
Party	Candidate	Votes	%	±%	Votes	%	±%
Plaid Cymru	Geraint Rhys Davies	13,558	48.7	N/A	12,908	46.1	N/A
Labour	Wayne David	11,273	40.5	N/A	11,256	40.2	N/A
Liberal Democrats	Meurig Williams	1,303	4.7	N/A	1,659	5.9	N/A
Independent	Glyndwr Summers	913	3.3				
Conservative	Peter Hobbins	774	2.8	N/A	801	2.9	N/A
Other list parties					1,395	5.0	N/A
Majority		2,285	8.2				
Turnout		27,821	50.2				
Plaid Cymru win (new seat)							

1999 Electorate: 55,266
