= Cardiff Central (Senedd constituency) =

Senedd constituency (1999–2026)

Coordinates: 51.504°N 3.150°W

Cardiff Central Canol Caerdydd
- Former Senedd borough constituency for the Senedd

- Cardiff Central shown within the South Wales Central electoral region and the region shown within Wales

Former Senedd borough constituency
- Created: 1999
- Abolished: 2026
- Party: Labour
- MS: Jenny Rathbone
- Preserved county: South Glamorgan

Cardiff Central (Welsh: Canol Caerdydd) was a constituency of the Senedd. It elected one Member of the Senedd by the first past the post method of election. It was one of eight constituencies in the South Wales Central electoral region, which elected four additional members (in addition to the eight constituency members) to produce a degree of proportional representation for the region as a whole.

== History ==
From 1999, Cardiff Central was a safe seat for the Liberal Democrats. However the seat was lost to Labour in 2011 with a huge 14.7% swing. In 2016 this was the Liberal Democrats target seat with their candidate Eluned Parrott a current regional AM for South Wales Central. The result actually saw a very slight increase in Labour's majority in a very disappointing night for the Liberal Democrats. The seat remained one of the most marginal in the Assembly until the 2021 Senedd election, where Labour increased their majority substantially.

In 2016 two former Big Brother participants were the candidates for Plaid Cymru and the Conservatives.

== Boundaries ==
Map of 1999–2026 boundaries

The constituency was created for the first election to the Assembly, in 1999, with the name and boundaries of the Cardiff Central Westminster constituency prior to the 2023 review of Westminster constituencies. It was entirely within the preserved county of South Glamorgan.

The other seven constituencies of the region were Cardiff North, Cardiff South and Penarth, Cardiff West, Cynon Valley, Pontypridd, Rhondda and Vale of Glamorgan.

== Voting ==
In general elections for the Senedd, each voter had two votes. The first vote was used to vote for a candidate to become the Member of the Senedd for the voter's constituency, elected by the first past the post system. The second vote was used to vote for a regional closed party list of candidates. Additional member seats were allocated from the lists by the d'Hondt method, with constituency results being taken into account in the allocation.

== Assembly members and Members of the Senedd ==
Election	Member	Portrait	Party
1999	Jenny Randerson		Liberal Democrat
2011	Jenny Rathbone		Labour

== Elections ==
=== Elections in the 2020s ===
2021 Senedd election: Cardiff Central
Party	Candidate	Constituency			Regional		
Party	Candidate	Votes	%	±%	Votes	%	±%
Labour	Jenny Rathbone	13,100	45.9	+7.5	11,272	39.5	+6.4
Liberal Democrats	Rodney Berman	5,460	19.1	-16.2	4,522	15.9	-12.3
Conservative	Calum Davies	3,788	13.3	+4.4	4,047	14.2	+4.0
Plaid Cymru	Wiliam Rees	3,470	12.2	+4.7	4,633	16.3	+5.4
Green	Ceri Davies	1,552	5.4	+1.0	2,258	7.9	+2.0
Abolish	Munawar Mughal	440	1.5	New	643	2.3	-0.6
Propel	Dilan Nazari	268	0.9	New	296	1.0	New
Freedom Alliance	Thomas Franklin	156	0.5	New			
Reform	Julian Bosley	151	0.5	New	173	0.6	New
Socialist (GB)	Brian Johnson	82	0.3	New			
Gwlad	Alford Thomas	65	0.2	New	80	0.3	New
UKIP					200	0.7	-5.2
No More Lockdowns					135	0.5	New
TUSC					97	0.3	-0.1
Communist					87	0.3	+0.1
Workers Party					33	0.1	New
Independent	Alan Coulthard				32	0.1	New
Majority		7,640	26.8	+23.7			
Turnout		28,532	44.5	-1.1			
Labour hold		Swing					

=== Elections in the 2010s ===
Welsh Assembly Election 2016: Cardiff Central
Party	Candidate	Constituency			Regional		
Party	Candidate	Votes	%	±%	Votes	%	±%
Labour	Jenny Rathbone	10,016	38.4	+0.5	8,595	33.1	+0.3
Liberal Democrats	Eluned Parrott	9,199	35.3	-2.4	7,337	28.2	+2.3
Conservative	Joel Williams	2,317	8.9	-6.2	2,642	10.2	-5.9
Plaid Cymru	Glyn Wise	1,951	7.5	+0.3	2,831	10.9	+3.6
UKIP	Mohammed Islam	1,223	4.7	New	1,526	5.9	+2.6
Green	Amelia Womack	1,150	4.4	New	1,536	5.9	-3.2
Independent	Jane Croad	212	0.8	New			
Abolish					750	2.9	New
Women's Equality					437	1.7	New
Monster Raving Loony					118	0.5	-0.3
TUSC					107	0.4	-0.1
Freedom to Choose / Vapers in Power					42	0.2	New
Communist					40	0.2	-0.2
Independent (Jonathan Bishop)					24	0.1	New
Majority		817	3.1	+2.9			
Turnout		26,068	45.6	+7.6			
Labour hold		Swing	+1.7				

Welsh Assembly Election 2011: Cardiff Central
Party	Candidate	Constituency			Regional		
Party	Candidate	Votes	%	±%	Votes	%	±%
Labour	Jenny Rathbone	8,954	37.9	+16.0	7,778	32.8	+11.2
Liberal Democrats	Nigel Howells	8,916	37.7	-13.5	6,130	25.9	-11.1
Conservative	Matt Smith	3,559	15.1	+1.1	3,820	16.1	+0.6
Plaid Cymru	Chris Williams	1,690	7.2	-1.1	1,738	7.3	-1.9
Independent	Mathab Khan	509	2.2	New			
Green					2,163	9.1	+3.6
UKIP					789	3.3	-0.1
Socialist Labour					337	1.4	+0.6
BNP					330	1.4	-1.5
Welsh Christian					236	1.0	-0.1
Monster Raving Loony					178	0.8	New
TUSC					125	0.5	New
Communist					83	0.4	-0.1
Majority		38	0.2	N/A			
Turnout		23,628	38.0	+2.0			
Labour gain from Liberal Democrats		Swing	+14.7				

Regional ballots rejected at the count: 208

=== Elections in the 2000s ===
Welsh Assembly Election 2007: Cardiff Central
Party	Candidate	Constituency			Regional		
Party	Candidate	Votes	%	±%	Votes	%	±%
Liberal Democrats	Jenny Randerson	11,462	51.2	-3.4	8,281	37.0	-4.0
Labour	Sue Lent	4,897	21.9	+2.0	4,845	21.6	-2.1
Conservative	Andrew Murphy	3,137	14.0	+2.5	3,476	15.5	+2.6
Plaid Cymru	Thomas Whitfield	1,855	8.3	-0.3	2,051	9.2	-1.0
UKIP	Frank Hughes	1,046	4.7	New	769	3.4	±0.0
Green					1,238	5.5	+0.9
BNP					651	2.9	New
Welsh Christian					246	1.1	New
Respect					198	0.9	New
Socialist Labour					169	0.8	-0.6
Communist					110	0.5	+0.3
CPA					154	0.7	New
Socialist Alternative (UK)					123	0.5	New
Socialist Equality					74	0.3	New
Majority		6,565	29.3	−5.4			
Turnout		22,397	36.0	+2.3			
Liberal Democrats hold		Swing					

Welsh Assembly Election 2003: Cardiff Central
Party	Candidate	Constituency			Regional		
Party	Candidate	Votes	%	±%	Votes	%	±%
Liberal Democrats	Jenny Randerson	11,256	54.6	+12.3	8,434	41.0	+5.8
Labour	Geoff M. Mungham	4,100	19.9	-10.1	4,866	23.7	-4.6
Conservative	Craig S. Piper	2,378	11.5	-0.2	2,656	12.9	±0.0
Plaid Cymru	Owen John Thomas	1,795	8.6	-6.1	2,099	10.2	-6.4
Independent	Raja G. Raiz	541	2.6	New			
Independent	Captain Beany	212	0.8	New			
Independent	Madeleine E. Jeremy	239	1.2	New			
Green					940	4.6	+1.1
UKIP					694	3.4	New
Socialist Labour					279	1.4	Unknown
Vote No 2 Stop the War					226	1.1	New
ProLife Alliance					198	0.5	New
New Millennium Bean Party					168	0.8	New
Cymru Annibynnol					56	0.3	New
Communist					45	0.2	Unknown
Majority		7,156	34.7	+22.4			
Turnout		21,052	33.7	−11.1			
Liberal Democrats hold		Swing					

2003 Electorate: 62,470
Regional ballots rejected: 285

=== Elections in the 1990s ===
Welsh Assembly Election 1999: Cardiff Central
Party	Candidate	Constituency			Regional		
Party	Candidate	Votes	%	±%	Votes	%	±%
Liberal Democrats	Jenny Randerson	10,937	42.3	N/A	9,116	35.2	N/A
Labour	Mark Drakeford	7,769	30.0	N/A	7,343	28.3	N/A
Plaid Cymru	Owen John Thomas	3,795	14.7	N/A	4,307	16.6	N/A
Conservative	Stephen Jones	3,034	11.7	N/A	3,348	12.9	N/A
Socialist Alliance	Julian Goss	338	1.3				
Green					911	3.5	
Independent (Alun Mathias)					331	1.3	
Other List Parties					554	2.1	
Majority		3,168	12.3				
Turnout		25,873	44.8				
Liberal Democrats win (new seat)							

1999 Electorate: 57,700
