= Pontypridd (Senedd constituency) =

Senedd constituency (1999–2026)

Coordinates: 51.601°N 3.350°W

- Former Senedd county constituency for the Senedd

- Pontypridd shown within the South Wales Central electoral region and the region shown within Wales

Former Senedd county constituency
- Created: 1999
- Abolished: 2026
- Party: Labour
- MS: Mick Antoniw
- Preserved county: Mid Glamorgan; South Glamorgan

Pontypridd was a constituency of the Senedd. It elected one Member of the Senedd by the first past the post method of election. It was also one of eight constituencies in the South Wales Central electoral region that elected four additional members (along with eight constituency members), to produce a degree of proportional representation for the region as a whole.

== Boundaries ==
Map of 1999–2026 boundaries

The constituency was created for the first election to the Assembly, in 1999, with the name and boundaries of the Pontypridd Westminster constituency. It was within the preserved county of Mid Glamorgan.

The other seven constituencies of the region were Cardiff Central, Cardiff North, Cardiff South and Penarth, Cardiff West, Cynon Valley, Rhondda and Vale of Glamorgan.

== Voting ==
In general elections for the Senedd, each voter had two votes. The first vote was used to vote for a candidate to become the Member of the Senedd for the voter's constituency, elected by the first past the post system. The second vote was used to vote for a regional closed party list of candidates. Additional member seats were allocated from the lists by the d'Hondt method, with constituency results being taken into account in the allocation.

== Assembly Members and Members of the Senedd ==
Election	Member	Party	Portrait
1999	Jane Davidson	Labour	
2011	Mick Antoniw	Labour	

== Elections ==
=== Elections in the 2020s ===
2021 Senedd election: Pontypridd
Party	Candidate	Constituency			Regional		
Party	Candidate	Votes	%	±%	Votes	%	±%
Labour	Mick Antoniw (Note: Incumbent member for this constituency)	11,511	41.8	+2.4	10,629	38.5	+3.0
Plaid Cymru	Heledd Fychan	6,183	22.4	+4.0	6,572	23.8	+1.6
Conservative	Joel James	5,658	20.5	+5.2	5,800	21.0	+7.2
Independent	Wayne Owen	1,678	6.1	New			
Abolish	Michael Hughes	785	2.8	New	1,093	4.0	-0.4
Green	Ken Barker	655	2.4	+0.4	1,102	4.0	+1.4
Liberal Democrats	Steven Rajam	628	2.3	-9.5	793	2.9	-2.4
Reform	Jamie Jenkins	458	1.7	New	348	1.3	New
UKIP					393	1.4	-12.2
Propel					241	0.9	New
Gwlad					201	0.7	New
No More Lockdowns					135	0.5	New
Independent Alan Coulthard					131	0.5	New
Communist					83	0.3	±0.0
Workers Party					42	0.2	New
TUSC					40	0.1	-0.2
Majority		5,328	19.4	−1.6			
Turnout		27,556					
Labour hold		Swing					

=== Elections in the 2010s ===
Welsh Assembly Election 2016: Pontypridd
Party	Candidate	Constituency			Regional		
Party	Candidate	Votes	%	±%	Votes	%	±%
Labour	Mick Antoniw	9,986	39.4	-11.4	8,973	35.5	-9.7
Plaid Cymru	Chad Richards	4,659	18.4	+4.9	5,609	22.2	+8.5
Conservative	Joel James	3,884	15.3	-0.4	3,488	13.8	-0.4
UKIP	Edwin Allen	3,322	13.1	New	3,437	13.6	+8.6
Liberal Democrats	Mike Powell	2,979	11.8	-6.1	1,335	5.3	-5.1
Green	Ken Barker	508	2.0	New	650	2.6	-1.5
Abolish					1,116	4.4	New
Women's Equality					226	0.9	New
Monster Raving Loony					162	0.6	-0.1
Independent (Jonathan Bishop)					119	0.5	New
TUSC					76	0.3	-0.1
Communist					64	0.3	±0.0
Freedom to Choose / Vapers in Power					36	0.0	New
Majority		5,328	21.0	−11.9			
Turnout		25,328					
Labour hold		Swing					

Welsh Assembly Election 2011: Pontypridd
Party	Candidate	Constituency			List		
Party	Candidate	Votes	%	±%	Votes	%	±%
Labour	Mick Antoniw	11,864	50.8	+8.9	10,561	45.2	+7.2
Liberal Democrats	Mike Powell	4,170	17.9	-9.5	2,435	10.4	-6.7
Conservative	Joel James	3,659	15.7	+2.8	3,313	14.2	+1.7
Plaid Cymru	Ioan Bellin	3,139	13.5	-4.3	3,196	13.7	-4.6
Independent	Ken Owen	501	2.1	New			
UKIP					1,163	5.0	+1.7
Green					951	4.1	+0.5
Socialist Labour					637	2.7	+1.7
BNP					498	2.1	-1.7
Welsh Christian					249	1.1	±0.0
Monster Raving Loony					167	0.7	New
TUSC					101	0.4	New
Communist					73	0.3	-0.1
Majority		7,694	32.9	+18.4			
Turnout		34,431	51.9	+11.0			
Labour hold		Swing	+9.8				

Regional ballots rejected at the count: 147

=== Elections in the 2000s ===
Welsh Assembly Election 2007: Pontypridd
Party	Candidate	Constituency			Regional		
Party	Candidate	Votes	%	±%	Votes	%	±%
Labour	Jane Davidson	9,836	41.9	-8.1	8,847	38.0	-8.3
Liberal Democrats	Michael Powell	6,449	27.4	+13.3	3,985	17.1	+5.4
Plaid Cymru	Richard Grigg	4,181	17.8	-3.9	4,259	18.3	-1.3
Conservative	Janice Charles	3,035	12.9	+2.9	2,920	12.5	+1.5
BNP					878	3.8	New
Green					839	3.6	+0.2
UKIP					768	3.3	-0.8
Welsh Christian					263	1.1	New
Socialist Labour					223	1.0	-1.1
Socialist					123	0.5	New
CPA					107	0.5	New
Communist					104	0.4	±0.0
Respect					100	0.4	New
Socialist Equality					30	0.1	New
Majority		3,347	14.5	−14.2			
Turnout		23,501	40.9	+2.3			
Labour hold		Swing					

Welsh Assembly Election 2003: Pontypridd
Party	Candidate	Constituency			Regional		
Party	Candidate	Votes	%	±%	Votes	%	±%
Labour	Jane Davidson	12,206	50.0	+11.4	11,306	46.3	+8.7
Plaid Cymru	Delme Bowen	5,286	21.7	−10.6	4,783	19.6	-13.1
Liberal Democrats	Mike Powell	3,443	14.1	−3.1	2,862	11.7	-3.6
Conservative	Jayne Cowan	2,438	10.0	+1.5	2,692	11.0	+2.0
UKIP	Peter Gracia	1,025	4.2	New	999	4.1	New
Green					824	3.4	+1.4
Socialist Labour					538	2.2	+0.8
Cymru Annibynnol					138	0.6	New
Communist					100	0.4	±0.0
Vote No 2 Stop the War					70	0.3	New
New Millennium Bean Partyn					52	0.2	New
ProLife Alliance					47	0.2	New
Majority		6,920	28.3	+23.0			
Turnout		24,398	38.6	−6.8			
Labour hold		Swing	+11.0				

2003 Electorate: 63,204
Regional ballots rejected: Not reported

=== Elections in the 1990s ===
Welsh Assembly Election 1999: Pontypridd
Party	Candidate	Constituency			Regional		
Party	Candidate	Votes	%	±%	Votes	%	±%
Labour	Jane Davidson	11,330	38.6	N/A	11,093	37.6	N/A
Plaid Cymru	Bleddyn W. Hancock	9,755	33.3	N/A	9,664	32.7	N/A
Liberal Democrats	Gianni Orsi	5,040	17.2	N/A	4,523	15.3	N/A
Conservative	Susan Ingerfield	2,485	8.5	N/A	2,669	9.0	N/A
Independent	Paul Phillips	436	1.5	N/A			
Communist	Robert Griffiths	280	1.0	N/A	121	0.4	N/A
Green					600	2.0	
Socialist Labour					405	1.4	
Others					464	1.6	
Majority		1,575	5.3	N/A			
Turnout		29,326	45.4	N/A			
Labour win (new seat)							
