= 2003 National Assembly for Wales election =

- 1 May 2003

All 60 seats to the National Assembly for Wales 31 seats needed for a majority
- Turnout: 38.2% ▼7.8%
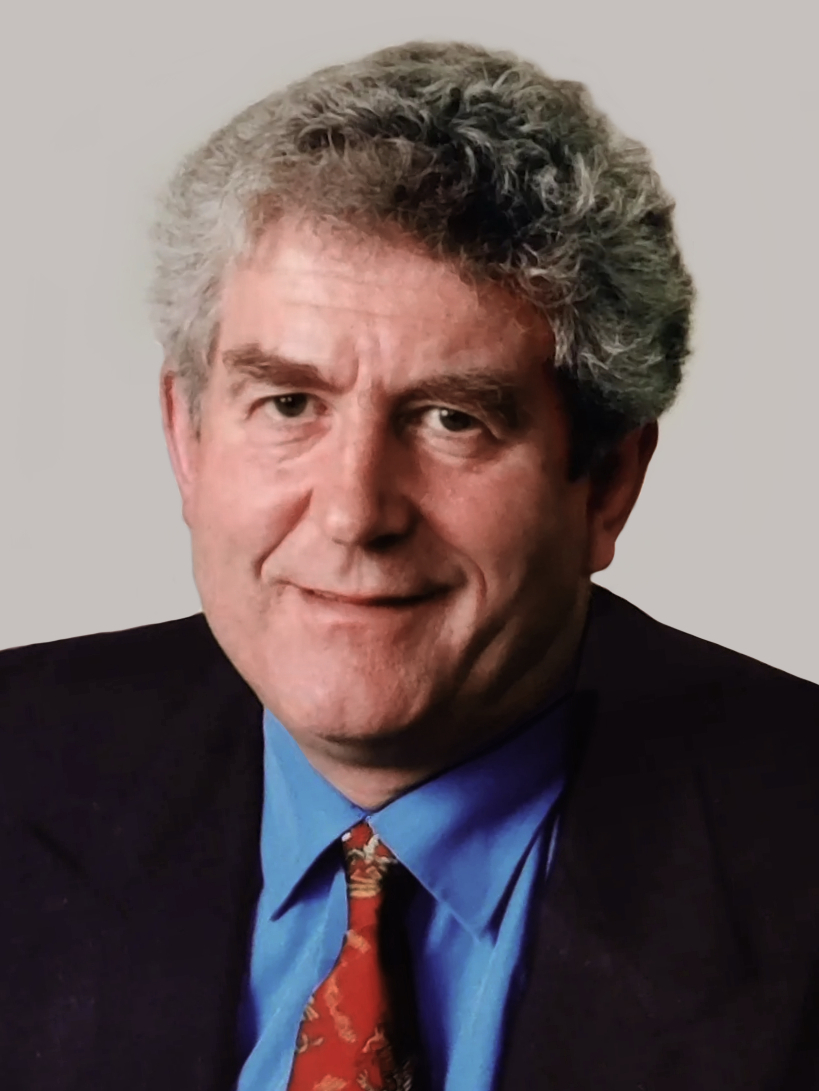

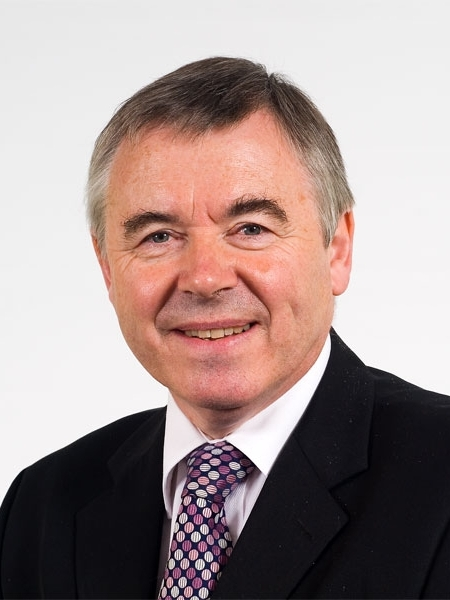

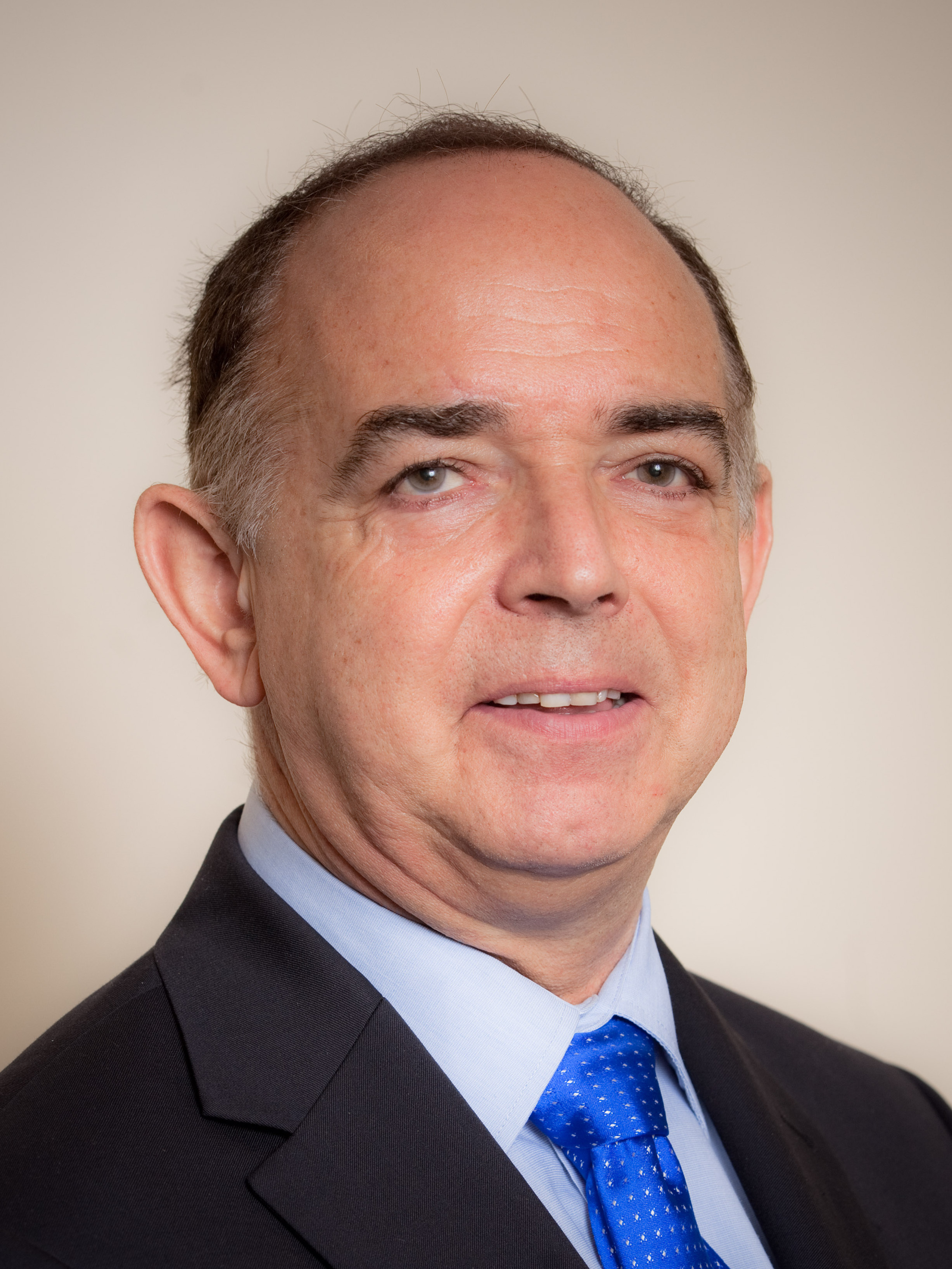

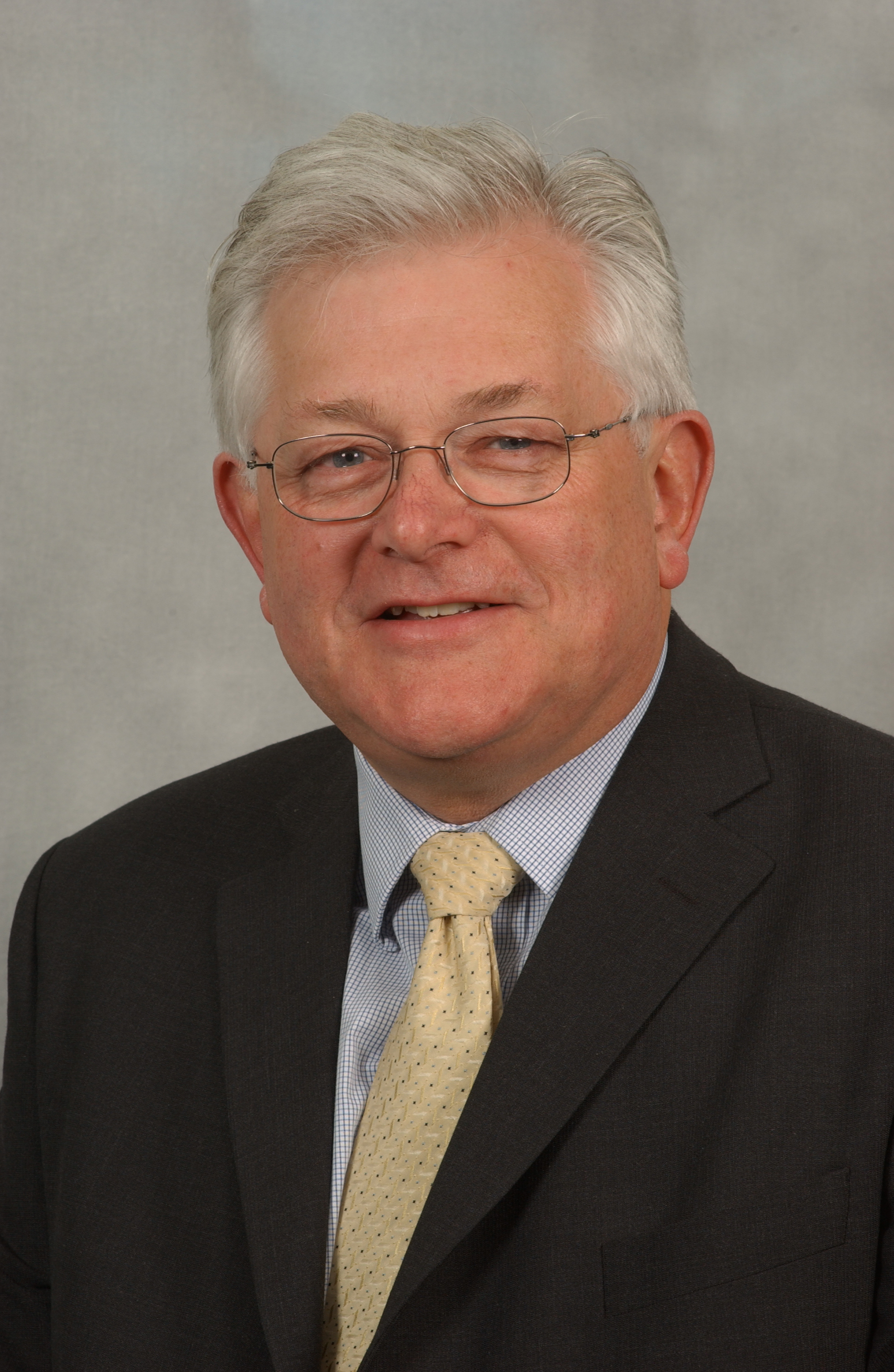

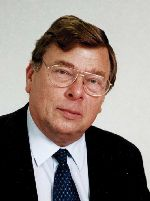
	First party	Second party	Third party
Leader	Rhodri Morgan	Ieuan Wyn Jones	Nick Bourne
Party	Labour	Plaid Cymru	Conservative
Leader since	11 February 2000	3 August 2000	18 August 1999
Leader's seat	Cardiff West	Ynys Môn	Mid and West Wales
Last election	28 (Note: Includes 8 AMs sponsored by the Co-operative Party, who are designated Labour and Co-operative.) seats	17 seats	9 seats
Seats won	30 (Note: Includes 5 AMs sponsored by the Co-operative Party, who are designated Labour and Co-operative.)	12	11
Seat change	▲2	▼5	▲2
Constituency Vote	340,515	180,185	169,832
% and swing	40.0% ▲2.4%	21.2% ▼7.2%	19.9% ▲4.1%
Regional Vote	310,658	167,653	162,725
% and swing	36.6% ▲1.2%	19.7% ▼10.8%	19.2% ▲2.7%
	Fourth party	Fifth party
Leader	Michael German (Note: German was National Assembly group leader. The Welsh Liberal Democrat party leader during this election was Montgomeryshire MP Lembit Öpik, who would remain as leader until 2007.)	John Marek
Party	Liberal Democrats	JMIP
Leader since	20 November 1998	31 March 2003
Leader's seat	South Wales East	Wrexham
Last election	6 seats	Did not contest
Seats won	6	1
Seat change	Steady	▲1
Constituency Vote	120,250	8,749
% and swing	14.1% ▲0.6%	1.0% (New)
Regional Vote	108,013	11,008
% and swing	12.7% ▲0.2%	1.3% (New)
First Minister before election
Rhodri Morgan
Labour
First Minister after election
Rhodri Morgan
Labour

An election for the National Assembly for Wales was held on 1 May 2003 and was the second general election to the National Assembly for Wales. The election was characterised by a resurgence for the Labour Party, whilst Plaid Cymru saw a reduction in support and the number of Assembly Members they returned. Having won thirty seats, one short of a majority, Labour chose to govern in minority without a coalition partner.

This election also saw the return of John Marek as an independent member of the Assembly. Of the 60 members elected, 30 were male and 30 were female.

It was held on the same day as the 2003 Scottish Parliament election and 2003 United Kingdom local elections.

== Party leaders in 2003 ==
- Welsh Labour – Rhodri Morgan
- Plaid Cymru – Ieuan Wyn Jones
- Welsh Conservatives – Nicholas Bourne
- Welsh Liberal Democrats – Michael James German
- UK Independence Party (UKIP) – Roger Knapman

== National vote ==
- Overall turnout – 38.2%

Welsh Assembly election, 2003
Parties	Additional member system										Total seats		
Parties	Constituency					Region					Total seats		
Parties	Votes	%	+/−	Seats	+/−	Votes	%	+/−	Seats	+/−	Total	+/−	%
Labour	340,515	40.0	+2.4	30	+3	310,658	36.6	+1.2	0	−1	30 (Note: Includes 5 AMs sponsored by the Co-operative Party, who are designated Labour and Co-operative.)	+2	50.0
Plaid Cymru	180,185	21.2	−7.2	5	−4	167,653	19.7	−10.8	7	−1	12	−5	20.0
Conservative	169,832	19.9	+4.1	1	0	162,725	19.2	+2.7	10	+2	11	+2	18.3
Liberal Democrats	120,250	14.1	+0.6	3	0	108,013	12.7	+0.2	3	0	6	0	10.0
Green	—	—	—	—	—	30,028	3.5	+1.0	0	0	0	0	—
UKIP	19,795	2.3	N/A	0	0	29,427	3.5	N/A	0	0	0	0	—
John Marek Independent Party	8,749	1.0	N/A	1	+1	11,008	1.3	N/A	0	0	1	+1	1.7
Socialist Labour	410	0.0	N/A	0	0	10,358	1.2	+0.2	0	0	0	0	—
Cymru Annibynnol	—	—	—	—	—	6,466	0.8	N/A	0	0	0	0	—
Mid and West Wales Pensioners Party	—	—	—	—	—	3,968	0.5	N/A	0	0	0	0	—
BNP	—	—	—	—	—	3,210	0.4	N/A	0	0	0	0	—
ProLife Alliance	239	0.0	N/A	0	0	2,183	0.3	N/A	0	0	0	0	—
Vote 2 Stop the War Party	—	—	—	—	—	1,729	0.2	N/A	0	0	0	0	—
Communist	—	—	—	—	—	1,099	0.1	0.0	0	0	0	0	—
New Millennium Bean Party	289	0.0	N/A	0	0	1,027	0.1	N/A	0	0	0	0	—
Independent	5,215	0.6	-2.4	0	0	—	—	—	—	—	0	0	—
Tinker Against the Assembly Party	2,201	0.3	N/A	0	0	—	—	—	—	—	0	0	—
Socialist Alliance	1,554	0.2	N/A	0	0	—	—	—	—	—	0	0	—
Socialist	1,193	0.1	N/A	0	0	—	—	—	—	—	0	0	—
Caerphilly Constituency Independents	930	0.1	N/A	0	0	—	—	—	—	—	0	0	—
Total	851,357			40		849,552			20		60		

=== Votes summary ===
Regional vote
Labour	36.6%
Plaid Cymru	19.7%
Conservative	19.2%
Liberal Democrats	12.7%
Green	3.5%
UKIP	3.5%
JMIP	1.3%
Others	3.5%

Parliament seats
Labour	50.0%
Plaid Cymru	20.0%
Conservative	18.3%
Liberal Democrats	10.0%
JMIP	1.7%

== Constituency and regional summary ==
=== Mid and West Wales ===
National Assembly for Wales election, 2003: Mid and West Wales
Constituency	Elected member	Result
Carmarthen East and Dinefwr	Rhodri Glyn Thomas	Plaid Cymru hold
Carmarthen West and South Pembrokeshire	Christine Gwyther	Labour hold
Ceredigion	Elin Jones	Plaid Cymru hold
Llanelli	Catherine Thomas	Labour win
Meirionnydd Nant Conwy	Dafydd Elis-Thomas	Plaid Cymru hold
Montgomeryshire	Mick Bates	Liberal Democrats hold
Preseli Pembrokeshire	Tamsin Dunwoody	Labour hold
Brecon and Radnorshire	Kirsty Williams	Liberal Democrats hold

	Conservative Party	Cymru Annibynnol	Green Party of England and Wales	Labour Party	Liberal Democrats	Mid & West Wales Pensioners	Plaid Cymru	ProLife Alliance	UKIP	Vote No 2 Stop the War
1.	Nick Bourne	Mick Grail	Dorienne Robinson	Cherry Short	Kirsty Williams	Vera Jenner	Helen Mary Jones	Sara Jeremy	Mrs. Elizabeth F. Phillips	Adrienne Morgan
2.	Glyn Davies	Debra Tester	Molly Scott-Cato	Tamsin Dunwoody	Mick Bates	Andrew Jacob	Delyth Richards	Ruth Davies	Iain Sheldon	Nina Minnigan
3.	Lisa Francis		Timothy Foster	Christine Gwyther	Steffan John		David Senior	Dominica Roberts	Clive Easton	Robin Benson
4.	O.J. Williams		Reg Taylor	Catherine Thomas	John Davies		Siôn Jobbins	Thomas Robberts	David Rowlands	Jennifer Keal
5.	Paul Davies		Christopher Cato	Anthony Cooper	Ken Harris		Paul Sambrook			David Bellamy
6.	Harri Lloyd Davies			David Rees	Mary Megarry		Siân Thomas			
7.	David Thomas			Rhianon Passmore						
8.	Gareth Jones			Rina Clarke						
9.				Eddie Woodward						

=== North Wales ===
National Assembly for Wales election, 2003: North Wales
Constituency	Elected member	Result
Alyn and Deeside	Carl Sargeant	Labour hold
Caernarfon	Alun Ffred Jones	Plaid Cymru hold
Clwyd South	Karen Sinclair	Labour hold
Clwyd West	Alun Pugh	Labour hold
Conwy	Denise Idris Jones	Labour win
Delyn	Sandy Mewies	Labour hold
Vale of Clwyd	Ann Jones	Labour hold
Wrexham	John Marek	JMIP win
Ynys Môn	Ieuan Wyn Jones	Plaid Cymru hold

	Communist Party of Britain	Conservative Party	Cymru Annibynnol	Green Party of England and Wales	John Marek Independent Party	Labour Party	Liberal Democrats	Plaid Cymru	UKIP
1.	Glyn Davies	Brynle Williams	Owain Williams	Klaus Armstrong-Braun	John Marek	Lesley Griffiths	Eleanor Burnham	Janet Ryder	Elwyn Williams
2.	David Morgan	Mark Isherwood	Dafydd Ifan	John Walker	Marc Jones	Carl Seargeant	Nick Bennett	Liz Saville	Edwina Theunissen
3.	Mike Green	Janet Finch-Saunders		Jeremy Hart	Colin Jones	Sandy Mewies	Bobby Feeley	Dyfed Edwards	John Walker
4.		Albie Fox		Wilfred Hastings		Karen Sinclair	Graham Rees	Eilian Williams	Francis Wykes
5.		Darren Miller		Gilly Boyd		Wycliffe Barrett	Carole O'Toole	Paul Rowlinson	
6.		Guto Bebb		Jim Killock		Ann Jones	Thomas Rippeth	Richard Coombs	
7.		Peter Rogers				Alun Pugh			
8.		Matt Wright				Denise Idris Jones			
9.		Goronwy Edwards				Gerwyn Jones			
10.						Martin Eaglestone			

=== South Wales Central ===
National Assembly for Wales election, 2003: South Wales Central
Constituency	Elected member	Result
Cardiff South and Penarth	Lorraine Barrett	Labour Co-op hold
Cardiff West	Rhodri Morgan	Labour hold
Cynon Valley	Christine Chapman	Labour Co-op hold
Pontypridd	Jane Davidson	Labour hold
Rhondda	Leighton Andrews	Labour win
Vale of Glamorgan	Jane Hutt	Labour hold
Cardiff Central	Jenny Randerson	Liberal Democrats hold
Cardiff North	Sue Essex	Labour hold

	Communist Party of Britain	Conservative Party	Cymru Annibynnol	Green Party of England and Wales	Labour Party	Liberal Democrats	New Millennium Bean Party	Plaid Cymru	ProLife Alliance	Socialist Labour Party	UKIP	Vote No 2 Stop the War
1.	Robert David Griffiths	Jonathan Morgan	Rev. Christopher Davies	John Matthews	Rhodri Morgan	Jenny Randerson	Captain Beany	Leanne Wood	Anne Savoury	Cerian Screen	Peter Gracia	Sura Altikriti
2.	Fran Rawlings	David Melding	Sophia Flouter	Lynn Farr	Lorraine Barrett	Rob Humphreys		Owen John Thomas	Madeleine Jeremy	Morfudd Marsden	Don Hulston	John Cox
3.	Dominic MacAskill	Dianne Rees	William Cross	Jan Tucker	Sikiru Fahm	Rodney Berman		Chris Franks	Josephine Quintaville	Kenneth Evans	Frank Hughes	John Palmer
4.	Gwen Griffiths	Jayne Cowan	Raymond Lloyd	Sylvia Latham	Sue Essex	John Dixon		Carole Willis	Anna Wilkins	Helen Walker	David Brown	Alastair Couper
5.		Daniel Thomas		Paul Beswick	Jane Davidson	Jacqui Gasson		Eluned Bush		Susan Deare		Phillip Kingston
6.		Craig Piper			Christine Chapman	Nilmini De Silva		Delme Bowen				George Crabbe
7.		Paul Williams			Jane Hutt							
8.		Heather Douglas			Leighton Andrews							
9.					Geoff Mungham							

=== South Wales East ===
National Assembly for Wales election, 2003: South Wales East
Constituency	Elected member	Result
Islwyn	Irene James	Labour win
Merthyr Tydfil and Rhymney	Huw Lewis	Labour Co-op hold
Monmouth	David Thomas Charles Davies	Conservative hold
Blaeuau Gwent	Peter Law	Labour Co-op hold
Newport East	John Griffiths	Labour Co-op hold
Newport West	Rosemary Butler	Labour hold
Torfaen	Lynne Neagle	Labour Co-op hold
Caerphilly	Jeffrey Cuthbert	Labour hold

	British National Party	Conservative Party	Cymru Annibynnol	Green Party of England and Wales	Labour Party	Liberal Democrats	Plaid Cymru	ProLife Alliance	Socialist Labour Party	UKIP
1.	Pauline Gregory	David Thomas Charles Davies	Catherine Lloyd	Peter Varley	Peter Law	Michael James German	Jocelyn Davies	Joseph Anthony Biddulph	Arthur Scargill	David J Rowlands
2.		William Graham	Gareth Roberts	Anne Were	Neil McEvoy	Ed Townsend	Lindsay Whittle	Norman Plaisted	Paul Adam	Neal Reynolds
3.		Laura Anne Jones	Susan Price	Owen Clarke	John Griffiths	Alison Willott	Mohammed Asghar	Fiona Pinto	Hayley O'Rourke	Roger Thomas
4.		Nick Ramsay	Andrew Broad	Ernest Hamer	Lynne Neagle	Philip Hobson	Gill Jones	Thomas Flynn	Robert Morris	Hugh Moelwyn Hughes
5.		John Prosser		Geraldine Layton	Rosemary Butler	Rob Roffe	Joanne Daniels		Mary Millington	
6.		Barrie O'Keefe		Teresa Telfer	Huw Lewis	Huw Price	Aneurin Preece		Reehana Sayeed	
7.		Terri-Anne Matthews		Matt Wootton	Jeff Cuthbert					
8.		Matthew Evans			Siân James					

=== South Wales West ===
National Assembly for Wales election, 2003: South Wales West
Constituency	Elected member	Result
Aberavon	Brian Gibbons	Labour hold
Gower	Edwina Hart	Labour hold
Neath	Gwenda Thomas	Labour hold
Ogmore	Janice Gregory	Labour hold
Swansea East	Val Lloyd	Labour hold
Swansea West	Andrew Davies	Labour hold
Bridgend	Carwyn Jones	Labour hold

	Conservative Party	Cymru Annibynnol	Green Party of England and Wales	Labour Party	Liberal Democrats	Plaid Cymru	ProLife Alliance	Socialist Labour Party	UKIP
1.	Alun Cairns	Rev. Christopher Davies	Martyn Shrewsbury	Brian Gibbons	Peter Black	Janet Davies	Gerardo Brienza	Christopher Herriott	Richard Lewis
2.	Gerald Rowbottom	Gwendolen MacKay	Jan Cliff	Janice Gregory	Cheryl Green	Dai Lloyd	Sean Haran	Liz Screen	Alan Robinson
3.	Chris Smart	Pedr Lewis	Rhodri Griffiths	Val Lloyd	Mike Day	Alun Llewelyn	Gillian Duval	Peter Greenslade	Tim Jenkins
4.	Myr Boult	Stephen Curry	Steve Clegg	Parvaiz Ali	Nick Tregoning	Siân Caiach	Karolina Stolarska	Gary Davies	David Evans
5.	Peter Morris		Deborah James	Carwyn Jones	Jackie Radford	Richard Williams			
6.	Richard Hill		Tony Young	Edwina Hart		Eirian Arwyn			
7.	Stephen James			Gwenda Thomas					
8.				Andrew Thomas					

== See also ==
- 2003 Scottish Parliament election
- 2003 United Kingdom local elections
