= Vale of Glamorgan (disambiguation) =

Places named Vale of Glamorgan include:

- Vale of Glamorgan — a borough and (from 1996) county borough in south Wales
- Vale of Glamorgan (UK Parliament constituency) — a constituency of the House of Commons of the Parliament of the United Kingdom
- Vale of Glamorgan (Senedd constituency) — a constituency of the Senedd
