= Eluned Parrott =

Welsh politician

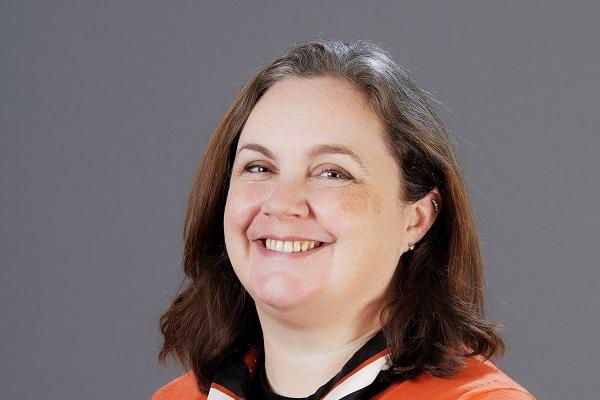

Member of the Welsh Assembly for South Wales Central
- In office 6 July 2011 – 6 April 2016
- Preceded by: Chris Franks
- Succeeded by: Gareth Bennett

Personal details
- Born: Abergavenny, Wales
- Party: Welsh Liberal Democrats

Eluned Parrott is a Welsh Liberal Democrat politician. She was an Assembly Member (AM) of the National Assembly for Wales between 2011 and 2016. She is a Commissioner of the National Infrastructure Commission for Wales.

== Background ==
Eluned was born in Abergavenny. She studied at St Peter's Collegiate School, in Wolverhampton. Parrott gained a degree in music from Cardiff University, and has a postgraduate diploma in marketing from the Chartered Institute of Marketing.

Before becoming an A.M., she worked as a community engagement manager for Cardiff University, leading a team that organises educational outreach and community events for the public. She has lived in the South Wales Central region since 1993; ten years in Cardiff Central and Cardiff West constituencies, and then eight years in the Vale of Glamorgan.

Parrott lives with her husband and two children in Rhoose, in the Vale of Glamorgan.

== Political career ==
Parrott contested the Vale of Glamorgan seat at the 2010 general election. She polled 15.2 per cent of the vote, the highest Welsh Liberal Democrat vote share in the seat for decades.

=== National Assembly for Wales ===
She became the first Welsh Liberal Democrat to be elected to the South Wales Central Assembly region in 2011 after the first candidate, John Dixon, failed to be reinstated following his suspension. He had been suspended on the grounds of being a member of the Care Council for Wales. In July 2011 she was given the Enterprise, Transport, Europe and Business portfolios by the Welsh leader Kirsty Williams. As a result, in the Welsh Assembly she sat on the Enterprise and Business Committee and Constitutional and Legislative Affairs Committee.

In November 2014, Parrott was announced as the Liberal Democrat candidate for Cardiff Central, in preparation for the 2016 Assembly election. In the election, she came second to Labour's Jenny Rathbone, taking 9,199 votes (35.3%). On the regional list, headed by Parrott, the Liberal Democrats' share of the vote dropped by 1.5% to 14,875 votes (6.4%), with Parrott losing her seat as a result.

=== Post-Assembly career ===
Parrott is a Commissioner of the National Infrastructure Commission for Wales.
