= Cardiff South and Penarth (Senedd constituency) =

Senedd constituency (1999–2026)

Coordinates: 51.469°N 3.127°W

Cardiff South and Penarth De Caerdydd a Phenarth
- Former Senedd borough constituency for the Senedd

- Cardiff South and Penarth shown within the South Wales Central electoral region and the region shown within Wales

Former Senedd borough constituency
- Created: 1999
- Abolished: 2026
- Party: Labour
- MS: Vaughan Gething
- Preserved county: South Glamorgan
- Replaced by: Caerdydd Penarth

Cardiff South and Penarth (Welsh: De Caerdydd a Phenarth) was a constituency of the Senedd. It elected one Member of the Senedd by the first past the post electoral system. It was typically a safe Labour seat.

== Constituency profile and voting ==
Map of 2007–2026 boundaries

The constituency was created for the first election to the Assembly, in 1999, with the name and boundaries of the Cardiff South and Penarth Westminster constituency prior to the 2023 review of Westminster constituencies. It was entirely within the preserved county of South Glamorgan. The only major boundary changes that have occurred in recent years is the inclusion of the ward of Sully into the constituency for the 2007 National Assembly for Wales election.

Cardiff South and Penarth was part of the South Wales Central electoral region. As one of the eight constituencies in South Wales Central, it, along with the other constituencies in the region, elected four additional members. The other seven constituencies of the region were Cardiff Central, Cardiff North, Cardiff West, Cynon Valley, Pontypridd, Rhondda and Vale of Glamorgan.

The use of the Additional Member System means that each voter had two votes. The first vote was for a candidate to become the Member of the Senedd for the voter's constituency, elected under the first past the post system. The second vote was used to vote for a regional closed party list of candidates. Additional member's seats were allocated from the lists by the d'Hondt method, to create a more proportional outcome in both the region and the Senedd.

== Assembly members and Members of the Senedd ==
Election	Member	Party	Portrait
1999	Lorraine Barrett	Labour Co-operative	
2011	Vaughan Gething	Labour	

== Elections ==
=== Elections in the 2020s ===
2021 Senedd election: Cardiff South and Penarth
Party	Candidate	Constituency			List		
Party	Candidate	Votes	%	±%	Votes	%	±%
Labour	Vaughan Gething	18,153	49.9	+6.1	15,036	41.5	+7.4
Conservative	Leighton Rowlands	7,547	20.7	-0.3	7,938	21.9	+3.3
Plaid Cymru	Nasir Adam	4,957	13.6	-0.7	5,983	16.5	+0.4
Green	Helen Westhead	1,643	4.5	+0.3	2,480	6.8	+1.5
Liberal Democrats	Alex Wilson	1,402	3.9	-0.5	1,555	4.3	-0.7
Abolish	Lisa Peregrine	732	2.0	New	1,040	2.9	-1.3
UKIP	Paul Campbell	576	1.6	-10.7	514	1.4	-11.7
Propel	Matt Friend	552	1.5	New	691	1.9	New
Reform	Alan Pick	295	0.8	New	308	0.8	New
Freedom Alliance	Alan Golding	273	0.8	New			
Independent	David Craig Rolfe	135	0.4	New			
Gwlad	Angus Hawkins	121	0.3	New	141	0.4	New
No More Lockdowns					239	0.7	New
TUSC					84	0.2	-0.2
Communist					111	0.3	±0.0
Workers Party					56	0.2	New
Independent	Alan Coulthard				69	0.2	New
Majority		10,606	29.2	+6.4			
Turnout		36,386	44.24	+4.4			
Labour hold		Swing					

=== Elections in the 2010s ===
Welsh Assembly Election 2016: Cardiff South and Penarth
Party	Candidate	Constituency			List		
Party	Candidate	Votes	%	±%	Votes	%	±%
Labour	Vaughan Gething	13,274	43.8	-6.5	9,521	34.1	-7.2
Conservative	Ben Gray	6,353	21.0	-6.5	5,205	18.6	-4.7
Plaid Cymru	Dafydd Trystan Davies	4,320	14.3	+2.2	4,505	16.1	+5.4
UKIP	Hugh Hughes	3,716	12.3	New	3,671	13.1	+8.4
Liberal Democrats	Nigel Howells	1,345	4.4	-5.7	1,396	5.0	-2.3
Green	Anthony Slaughter	1,268	4.2	New	1,491	5.3	-0.6
Abolish					1,164	4.2	New
Women's Equality					511	1.8	New
Monster Raving Loony					141	0.5	-0.2
TUSC					108	0.4	±0.0
Freedom to Choose / Vapers in Power					96	0.4	New
Communist					80	0.3	±0.0
Independent (Jonathan Bishop)					66	0.2	±0.0
Majority		6,921	22.8	±0.0			
Turnout		30,276	39.8	+2.5			
Labour hold		Swing					

Welsh Assembly Election 2011: Cardiff South and Penarth
Party	Candidate	Constituency			Regional		
Party	Candidate	Votes	%	±%	Votes	%	±%
Labour	Vaughan Gething	13,814	50.3	+12.5	11,452	41.3	+10.2
Conservative	Ben Gray	7,555	27.5	±0.0	6,467	23.3	-0.2
Plaid Cymru	Liz Musa	3,324	12.1	−2.2	2,973	10.7	-1.2
Liberal Democrats	Sian Cliff	2,786	10.1	−10.3	2,033	7.3	-9.0
Green					1,632	5.9	+2.0
UKIP					1,302	4.7	+0.3
BNP					600	2.2	-2.5
Socialist Labour					593	2.1	New
Welsh Christian					273	1.0	±0.0
Monster Raving Loony					190	0.7	New
TUSC					118	0.4	New
Communist					83	0.3	±0.0
Majority		6,259	22.8	+12.5			
Turnout		27,479	37.3	−0.2			
Labour hold		Swing	+6.2				

Regional ballots rejected at the count: 176

=== Elections in the 2000s ===
Welsh Assembly Election 2007: Cardiff South and Penarth
Party	Candidate	Constituency			Regional		
Party	Candidate	Votes	%	±%	Votes	%	±%
Labour Co-op	Lorraine Barrett	10,106	37.8	-6.8	8,333	31.1	-7.4
Conservative	Karen Robson	7,352	27.5	+3.3	6,290	23.5	+1.4
Liberal Democrats	Dominic Hannigan	5,445	20.4	+4.7	4,362	16.3	+2.7
Plaid Cymru	Jason Toby	3,825	14.3	+1.7	3,190	11.9	-0.4
BNP					1,251	4.7	New
UKIP					1,166	4.4	+0.1
Green					1,054	3.9	+0.1
Welsh Christian					261	1.0	New
Socialist Labour					244	0.9	-1.3
Respect					219	0.8	New
Socialist					150	0.6	New
CPA					107	0.4	New
Communist					89	0.3	-0.1
Socialist Equality					50	0.2	New
Majority		2,754	10.3	−10.1			
Turnout		26,728	37.5	+6.8			
Labour hold		Swing	-4.2				

Welsh Assembly Election 2003: Cardiff South and Penarth
Party	Candidate	Constituency			Regional		
Party	Candidate	Votes	%	±%	Votes	%	±%
Labour Co-op	Lorraine Barrett	8,978	44.6	-3.4	7,754	38.6	-6.1
Conservative	Dianne E. Rees	4,864	24.2	+5.7	4,437	22.1	+4.2
Liberal Democrats	Rodney Berman	3,154	15.7	+3.2	2,726	13.6	+1.4
Plaid Cymru	Richard R. Grigg	2,538	12.6	-4.5	2,485	12.4	+6.1
Socialist	David C. Bartlett	585	2.9	+1.4			
UKIP					867	4.3	New
Green					766	3.8	Unknown
Socialist Labour					389	1.9	Unknown
New Millennium Bean Party					199	1.0	New
Vote No 2 Stop the War					176	0.9	New
Cymru Annibynnol					139	0.7	New
ProLife Alliance					93	0.5	New
Communist					76	0.4	Unknown
Majority		4,114	20.4	−9.1			
Turnout		20,119	30.7	−7.1			
Labour hold		Swing	-2.7				

2003 Electorate: 65,505
Regional ballots rejected: 423

=== Elections in the 1990s ===
Welsh Assembly Election 1999: Cardiff South and Penarth
Party	Candidate	Constituency			Regional		
Party	Candidate	Votes	%	±%	Votes	%	±%
Labour Co-op	Lorraine Barrett	11,057	48.0	N/A	10,292	44.7	N/A
Conservative	Mary R. Davies	4,254	18.5	N/A	4,127	17.9	N/A
Plaid Cymru	John Rowlands	3,931	17.1	N/A	4,252	18.5	N/A
Liberal Democrats	Jane Maw-Cornish	2,890	12.5	N/A	2,819	12.2	N/A
Socialist Alliance	David C. Bartlett	355	1.5				
Independent Labour	John Foreman	339	1.5				
Celtic Alliance	Tom Davies	210	0.9				
United Socialist					147	0.6	N/A
Others					1,387	6.0	N/A
Majority		6,803	29.5				
Turnout		23,036	37.8				
Labour Co-op win (new seat)							

1999 Electorate: 60,996

Senedd
Preceded by Cardiff West	Constituency represented by the First Minister; 2024-present	Incumbent
