= Rhys ab Owen =

Welsh politician

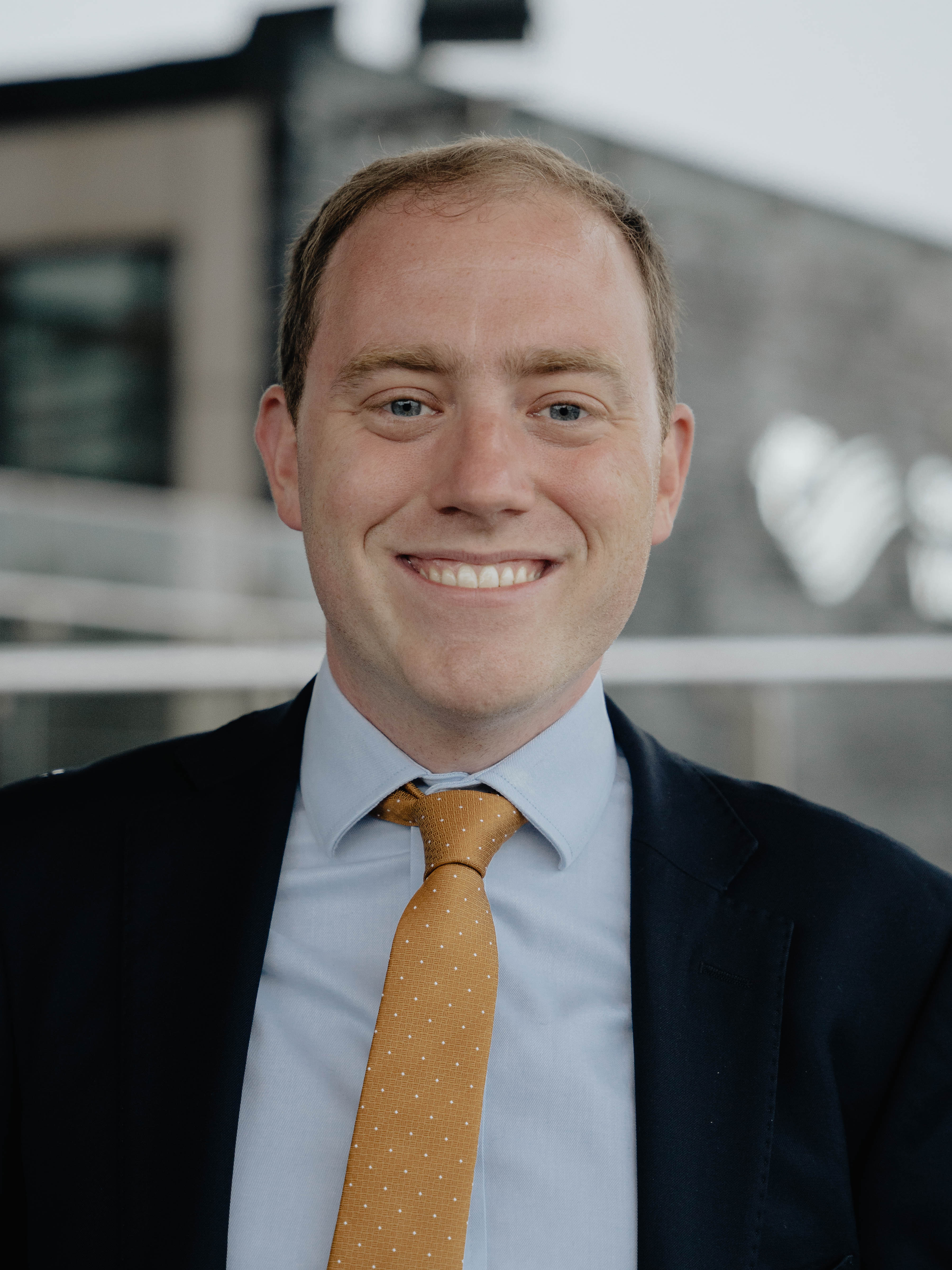
- ab Owen in 2021

Member of the Senedd for South Wales Central
- In office 8 May 2021 – 8 April 2026

Personal details
- Born: 12 January 1987 (age 39) Cardiff, Wales
- Party: Independent (since 2024)
- Other political affiliations: Plaid Cymru (until 2024)
- Parent: Owen John Thomas (father)
- Education: Oxford University
- Profession: Barrister

Rhys ab Owen (born 12 January 1987), also sometimes referred to as Rhys ab Owen Thomas is a Welsh politician who represented the South Wales Central constituency from 2021 to 2026. He was suspended from the Senedd for 42 days - the longest suspension of any Senedd Member, after he was found to have "inappropriately touched" a woman on a night out. A former member of Plaid Cymru, ab Owen was suspended in 2022, and formally expelled from the party in July 2024. His father, Owen John Thomas, represented the same region for the same party.

== Background ==
Rhys ab Owen was born and raised in Cardiff. He is the son of Sian Wyn Thomas, a former headteacher of Ysgol Glan Morfa, Splott, and Owen John Thomas, a former Plaid Cymru politician who represented the South Wales Central region in the National Assembly for Wales from 1999 to 2007. Rhys attended Ysgol Gyfun Gymraeg Glantaf in Llandaff North, before reading law at the University of Oxford. Ab Owen then undertook the Barrister Training Course at Cardiff University, and has practiced as a barrister since 2010.

== Political career ==
Ab Owen stood for Plaid Cymru in the 2017 Cardiff Council election in the Canton ward, where he increased the Plaid Cymru vote from 910 to 2,105, narrowly losing to the winning Labour candidates.

Later, ab Owen stood in the 2021 Senedd election as a Plaid Cymru candidate for Cardiff West, competing against the incumbent MS and First Minister Mark Drakeford (Welsh Labour). Drakeford retained his seat in Cardiff West, with ab Owen finishing third behind Drakeford and the Conservative candidate, Sean Driscoll. However, ab Owen was elected as a Member of the Senedd for South Wales Central, alongside fellow regional Plaid Cymru candidate Heledd Fychan, by virtue of topping the regional list of Plaid Cymru candidates in the region.

Upon reaching the Senedd, ab Owen became Plaid Cymru's constitution and justice spokesperson.

Ab Owen previously served as a member of the Senedd petitions committee. He was also a member of cross-party groups on beer and pubs, dementia, digital rights and democracy, faith, lung health, policing, Public and Commercial Services Union (the Senedd's relationship with it) and rented housing and leasehold properties.

=== Inappropriate conduct and suspension ===
On 8 November 2022, ab Owen was suspended from Plaid Cymru, pending an investigation by the Senedd's standards watchdog over an alleged breach of the code of conduct. On 6 March 2024, the Senedd's Standards of Conduct Committee recommended that ab Owen be suspended from the Senedd for 42 sitting days after finding that he had "inappropriately touched" a woman on a night out and twice called her a "bitch". On 13 March 2024, the Senedd agreed to suspended the member according to the Standards of Conduct Committee's recommendation. He was allowed to return to the Senedd on the 15 May 2024, after his suspension concluded. His case prompted calls for a recall system to be implemented for the Senedd. In July 2024, he was expelled from Plaid Cymru, with the party stating he would not be able to re-apply for two years. Although he stood as an independent for the 2026 Senedd election in the Caerdydd Penarth constituency he was not re-elected, receiving 0.5% of the vote.

== Personal life ==
In 2019, ab Owen married Manon Eluned George; the couple have two daughters. He lists his recreations as "Welsh history, choir, family, chapel" and is a member of the Ifor Bach club in Cardiff.
