= Cardiff West (Senedd constituency) =

Senedd constituency (1999–2026)

Coordinates: 51.486°N 3.214°W

Cardiff West Gorllewin Caerdydd
- Former Senedd borough constituency for the Senedd

- Cardiff West shown within the South Wales Central electoral region and the region shown within Wales

Former Senedd borough constituency
- Created: 1999
- Abolished: 2026
- Party: Welsh Labour
- Member of the Senedd: Mark Drakeford
- Preserved county: South Glamorgan

Cardiff West (Welsh: Gorllewin Caerdydd) was a constituency of the Senedd. It elected one Member of the Senedd by the first past the post method of election. Also, however, it was one of eight constituencies in the South Wales Central electoral region, which elected four additional members, in addition to eight constituency members, to produce a degree of proportional representation for the region as a whole. The constituency has twice provided the First Minister of Wales, Rhodri Morgan from 2000-2009 and Mark Drakeford from 2018–2024.

== Boundaries ==
Map of 1999–2026 boundaries

The constituency was created for the first election to the Assembly, in 1999, with the name and boundaries of the Cardiff West Westminster constituency prior to the 2023 review of Westminster constituencies. It was entirely within the preserved county of South Glamorgan.

The other seven constituencies of the region were Cardiff Central, Cardiff North, Cardiff South and Penarth, Cynon Valley, Pontypridd, Rhondda and Vale of Glamorgan.

== Voting ==
In general elections for the Senedd, each voter had two votes. The first vote was used to vote for a candidate to become the Member of the Senedd for the voter's constituency, elected by the first past the post system. The second vote was used to vote for a regional closed party list of candidates. Additional member seats were allocated from the lists by the d'Hondt method, with constituency results being taken into account in the allocation.

Election	Member	Party	Portrait	Notes
1999	Rhodri Morgan	Labour		Secretary for Economic Development and European Affairs (1999–2000) Leader of Welsh Labour & First Minister of Wales (2000–2009)
2011	Mark Drakeford	Labour		Minister for Health and Social Services (2013–2016 and 2024) Minister for Finance (2016–2018 and 2024 – present); Leader of Welsh Labour and First Minister of Wales (2018–2024)

== Elections ==
=== Elections in the 2020s ===
2021 Senedd election: Cardiff West
Party	Candidate	Constituency			Regional		
Party	Candidate	Votes	%	±%	Votes	%	±%
Labour	Mark Drakeford (Note: Incumbent member for this constituency)	17,665	48.4	+12.8	13,421	37.0	+7.0
Conservative	Sean Driscoll	6,454	17.7	+0.2	6,553	18.0	+1.6
Plaid Cymru	Rhys ab Owen	5,897	16.1	-15.8	7,858	21.6	-9.1
Propel	Neil McEvoy (Note: Incumbent member on the party list, or for another constituency)	3,473	9.5	N/A	2,796	7.7	N/A
Green	David Griffin	1,287	3.5	+0.3	2,479	6.8	+2.5
Liberal Democrats	Heath John Marshall	803	2.2	-0.5	1,155	3.2	-0.6
Abolish	Lee Canning	682	1.9	New	988	2.7	-0.9
Reform UK	Nick Mullins	175	0.5	New	215	0.6	New
Independent	Captain Beany	95	0.3	New			
UKIP					354	1.0	-7.5
No More Lockdowns					157	0.4	New
Gwlad					104	0.3	New
TUSC					76	0.2	-0.1
Communist					73	0.2	±0.0
Independent	Alan Coulthard				40	0.2	New
Workers Party					39	0.1	New
Majority		11,211	30.7	+27.0			
Turnout		36,531	50.55	+2.1			
Labour hold		Swing					

=== Elections in the 2010s ===
Welsh Assembly Election 2016: Cardiff West
Party	Candidate	Constituency			Regional		
Party	Candidate	Votes	%	±%	Votes	%	±%
Labour Co-op	Mark Drakeford	11,381	35.6	-11.5	9,521	30.0	-7.5
Plaid Cymru	Neil McEvoy	10,205	31.9	+11.9	9,741	30.7	+14.2
Conservative	Sean Driscoll	5,617	17.5	-8.3	5,205	16.4	-5.9
UKIP	Gareth Bennett	2,629	8.2	New	2,698	8.5	+4.4
Green	Hannah Pudner	1,032	3.2	New	1,375	4.3	-4.3
Liberal Democrats	Cadan ap Tomos	868	2.7	-4.3	1,222	3.8	-1.7
Independent	Eliot Freedman	132	0.4	New			
Vapers in Power / Freedom to Choose	Lee Woolls	96	0.3	New	47	0.1	New
Abolish					1,136	3.6	New
Women's Equality					448	1.4	New
Monster Raving Loony					113	0.3	-0.3
TUSC					98	0.3	0.0
Independent (Jonathan Bishop)					75	0.2	New
Communist					73	0.2	0.0
Majority		1,176	3.7	−17.6			
Turnout		31,960	48.4	−4.6			
Labour Co-op hold		Swing	-11.7				

Welsh Assembly Election 2011: Cardiff West
Party	Candidate	Constituency			Regional		
Party	Candidate	Votes	%	±%	Votes	%	±%
Labour Co-op	Mark Drakeford	13,067	47.1	+8.5	10,413	37.5	+4.8
Conservative	Craig Williams	7,166	25.8	+1.1	6,187	22.3	+0.1
Plaid Cymru	Neil McEvoy	5,551	20.0	-1.3	4,581	16.5	-2.4
Liberal Democrats	David Paul Morgan	1,942	7.0	-8.2	1,523	5.5	-6.2
Green					2,379	8.6	+3.2
UKIP					1,146	4.1	+2.0
BNP					514	1.9	-1.8
Socialist Labour					494	1.8	+1.1
Welsh Christian					224	0.8	±0.0
Monster Raving Loony					153	0.6	New
TUSC					96	0.3	New
Communist					56	0.2	-0.1
Majority		1,782	21.3	+7.6			
Turnout		27,726	53.0	+11.4			
Labour Co-op hold		Swing					

Regional ballots rejected at the count: 205

=== Elections in the 2000s ===
Welsh Assembly Election 2007: Cardiff West
Party	Candidate	Constituency			Regional		
Party	Candidate	Votes	%	±%	Votes	%	±%
Labour	Rhodri Morgan	10,390	38.6	-10.4	8,528	32.7	-8.4
Conservative	Craig Williams	6,692	24.9	+7.1	5,782	22.2	+3.2
Plaid Cymru	Neil McEvoy	5,719	21.3	+5.8	4,920	18.9	+4.3
Liberal Democrats	Alison R. Goldsworthy	4,088	15.2	+1.6	3,056	11.7	-0.8
Green					1,410	5.4	+0.6
BNP					970	3.7	New
UKIP					553	2.1	-2.5
Welsh Christian					206	0.8	New
Socialist Labour					183	0.7	-0.5
Respect					178	0.7	New
Socialist					92	0.3	New
Communist					78	0.3	±0.0
CPA					76	0.1	New
Socialist Equality					27	0.1	New
Majority		3,698	13.7	−19.3			
Turnout		26,889	41.6	−6.2			
Labour hold		Swing	-8.8				

Welsh Assembly Election 2003: Cardiff West
Party	Candidate	Constituency			Regional		
Party	Candidate	Votes	%	±%	Votes	%	±%
Labour	Rhodri Morgan	10,420	50.3	-11.3	8,568	41.2	-2.0
Conservative	Heather Douglas	3,583	17.3	+2.5	3,947	19.0	+1.7
Liberal Democrats	Jacqui Gasson	2,914	14.1	+5.2	2,604	12.5	+0.2
Plaid Cymru	Eluned M. Bush	2,859	13.8	-0.9	3,041	14.6	-6.3
UKIP	Frank Hughes	929	4.5	New	952	4.6	New
Green					991	4.8	+1.7
Socialist Labour					255	1.2	-0.2
Vote No 2 Stop the War					151	0.7	New
New Millennium Bean Party					146	0.7	New
ProLife Alliance					41	0.2	New
Cymru Annibynnol					56	0.3	New
Communist					68	0.3	±0.0
Majority		6,837	33.0	−13.8			
Turnout		20,705	34.2	−6.0			
Labour hold		Swing	-6.9				

2003 Electorate: 60,523
Regional ballots rejected: 274

=== Elections in the 1990s ===
Welsh Assembly Election 1999: Cardiff West
Party	Candidate	Constituency			Regional		
Party	Candidate	Votes	%	±%	Votes	%	±%
Labour	Rhodri Morgan	14,305	61.6	N/A	9,997	43.2	N/A
Conservative	Myr Boult	3,446	14.8	N/A	4,000	17.3	N/A
Plaid Cymru	Eluned Bush	3,402	14.7	N/A	4,838	20.9	N/A
Liberal Democrats	Dewi H Garrow-Smith	2,063	8.9	N/A	2,850	12.3	N/A
Green					726	3.1	N/A
Socialist Labour					335	1.4	N/A
Independent (Alun Mathias)					153	0.7	N/A
Socialist Alliance					92	0.4	N/A
Natural Law					72	0.3	N/A
Communist					69	0.3	N/A
Independent (Paul Phillips)					14	0.1	N/A
Majority		10,859	46.8				
Turnout		23,216	40.2				
Labour win (new seat)							

1999 Electorate: 57,582

Senedd
Preceded by Mid and West Wales	Constituency represented by the First Minister; 2000–2009	Succeeded by Bridgend
Preceded by Bridgend	Constituency represented by the First Minister; 2018–2024	Succeeded by Cardiff South and Penarth
