= Vale of Glamorgan (Senedd constituency) =

Senedd constituency (1999–2026)

Coordinates: 51.429°N 3.351°W

Vale of Glamorgan Bro Morgannwg
- Former Senedd borough constituency for the Senedd

- Vale of Glamorgan shown within the South Wales Central electoral region and the region shown within Wales

Former Senedd borough constituency
- Created: 1999
- Abolished: 2026
- Party: Welsh Labour
- MS: Jane Hutt
- Preserved county: Mid Glamorgan; South Glamorgan

Vale of Glamorgan (Welsh: Bro Morgannwg) was a constituency of the Senedd. It elected one Member of the Senedd by the first past the post method of election. Together with seven outher constituencies, it also made up the South Wales Central electoral region, which elected four additional members, in addition to the eight constituency members, to produce a degree of proportional representation for the region as a whole.

During the 2026 review of Senedd constituencies, the Vale of Glamorgan constituency was abolished, and the area was subsumed into the six-memeber constituency of Pen-y-bont Bro Morgannwg, beginning with the 2026 Senedd election.

== Boundaries ==
Map of 1999–2026 boundaries

The constituency was created for the first election to the Assembly, in 1999, with the name and boundaries of the Vale of Glamorgan Westminster constituency. It was partly within the preserved county of Mid Glamorgan and partly within the preserved county of Glamorgan.

The other seven constituencies of the region were Cardiff Central, Cardiff North, Cardiff South and Penarth, Cardiff West, Cynon Valley, Pontypridd and Rhondda.

== Voting ==
In general elections for the Senedd, each voter had two votes. The first vote was used to vote for a candidate to become the Member of the Senedd for the voter's constituency, elected by the first past the post system. The second vote was used to vote for a regional closed party list of candidates. Additional member seats were allocated from the lists by the d'Hondt method, with constituency results being taken into account in the allocation.

== Members of the Senedd ==
Election	Member	Party	Portrait
1999	Jane Hutt	Welsh Labour	

== Elections ==
=== Elections in the 2020s ===
2021 Senedd election: Vale of Glamorgan
Party	Candidate	Constituency			Regional		
Party	Candidate	Votes	%	±%	Votes	%	±%
Labour	Jane Hutt	18,667	43.5	+4.7	15,150	35.4	+5.3
Conservative	Matt Smith	15,397	35.9	-0.8	15,232	35.6	+2.8
Plaid Cymru	Richard Grigg	3,699	8.6	-1.6	5,291	12.4	-0.9
Abolish	Stuart Field	1,394	3.3	New	1,875	4.4	-1.0
Green	Anthony Slaughter	1,262	2.9	+0.8	1,936	4.5	+1.9
Liberal Democrats	Sally Stephenson	994	2.3	-0.2	1,196	2.8	±0.0
Propel	Janet Brocklehurst	426	1.0	New	474	1.1	New
Reform	Michael Hancock	416	1.0	New	370	0.9	New
Independent	Alan Coulthard	237	0.6	New	142	0.3	New
Freedom Alliance (UK)	Neill Vasudeo Shah	226	0.5	New	189	0.4	New
Gwlad	Karl-James Langford	174	0.4	New	185	0.4	New
UKIP					562	1.3	-9.2
Workers Party					87	0.2	New
Communist					67	0.2	±0.0
TUSC					60	0.1	-0.2
Majority		3,270	7.6	+5.5			
Turnout		41,413					
Labour hold		Swing					

=== Elections in the 2010s ===
2016 National Assembly for Wales election: Vale of Glamorgan
Party	Candidate	Constituency			Regional		
Party	Candidate	Votes	%	±%	Votes	%	±%
Labour	Jane Hutt	14,655	38.8	-8.6	11,341	30.1	-5.3
Conservative	Ross England	13,878	36.7	+0.7	12,338	32.8	-1.1
Plaid Cymru	Ian Johnson	3,871	10.2	-1.9	5,002	13.3	+0.9
UKIP	Lawrence Andrews	3,662	9.7	New	3,933	10.5	+5.1
Liberal Democrats	Denis Campbell	938	2.5	2.0	1,070	2.8	-1.4
Green	Alison Haden	794	2.1	New	969	2.6	-1.2
Abolish					2,024	5.4	New
Women's Equality					430	1.1	New
Monster Raving Loony					179	0.5	-0.1
TUSC					106	0.3	±0.0
Independent (John Bishop)					100	0.3	New
Freedom to Choose					75	0.2	New
Communist					67	0.2	+0.1
Majority		777	2.1	−9.3			
Turnout		41,413					
Labour hold		Swing					

2011 National Assembly for Wales election: Vale of Glamorgan
Party	Candidate	Constituency			Regional		
Party	Candidate	Votes	%	±%	Votes	%	±%
Labour	Jane Hutt	15,746	47.4	+13.2	11,746	35.4	+7.0
Conservative	Angela-Jones Evans	11,971	36.0	+2.1	11,254	33.9	+0.1
Plaid Cymru	Ian Johnson	4,024	12.1	1.8	4,122	12.4	-2.6
Liberal Democrats	Damian Chick	1,531	4.5	-6.7	1,390	4.2	-3.2
UKIP					1,777	5.4	-0.5
Green					1,253	3.8	+0.4
Socialist Labour					608	1.8	+1.2
BNP					507	1.5	-2.4
Welsh Christian					213	0.6	±0.0
Monster Raving Loony					183	0.6	New
TUSC					90	0.3	New
Communist					44	0.1	-0.1
Majority		3,775	11.4	+11.1			
Turnout		33,254	46.7	−2.2			
Labour hold		Swing					
Notes

Regional ballots rejected at the count: 233

=== Elections in the 2000s ===
Welsh Assembly Election 2007: Vale of Glamorgan
Party	Candidate	Constituency			Regional		
Party	Candidate	Votes	%	±%	Votes	%	±%
Labour	Jane Hutt	11,515	34.2	-9.8	9,378	28.4	-0.9
Conservative	Gordon C Kemp	11,432	33.9	-0.6	11,150	33.8	+0.2
Plaid Cymru	Barry I Shaw	4,671	13.9	-0.2	4,941	15.0	+0.8
Liberal Democrats	Mark J. Hooper	3,758	11.2	+3.8	2,435	7.4	-0.7
UKIP	Kevin P Mahoney	2,310	6.9	New	1,938	5.9	+1.7
BNP					1,295	3.9	New
Green					1,108	3.4	+0.6
Socialist Labour					204	0.6	-0.4
Welsh Christian					200	0.6	New
Respect					118	0.4	New
Socialist					92	0.3	New
Communist					81	0.2	±0.0
CPA					62	0.2	New
Socialist Equality					28	0.1	New
Majority		83	0.3	−9.2			
Turnout		33,668	48.9	+8.2			
Labour hold		Swing	-4.56				

Welsh Assembly Election 2003: Vale of Glamorgan
Party	Candidate	Constituency			Regional		
Party	Candidate	Votes	%	±%	Votes	%	±%
Labour	Jane Hutt	12,267	44.0	+9.1	10,068	36.3	+4.3
Conservative	David Melding	9,614	34.5	+2.4	8,676	31.3	+0.7
Plaid Cymru	Chris Franks	3,921	14.1	-9.9	3,948	14.2	-8.5
Liberal Democrats	Nilmini P. De Silva	2,049	7.4	-1.6	2,243	8.1	-2.0
UKIP					1,165	4.2	New
Green					777	2.8	Unknown
Socialist Labour					291	1.0	Unknown
New Millennium Bean Partyn					179	0.6	New
Cymru Annibynnol					178	0.6	New
Vote No 2 Stop the War					106	0.4	New
Communist					55	0.2	Unknown
ProLife Alliance					37	0.1	New
Majority		2,653	9.5	+6.7			
Turnout		27,851	40.7	−7.8			
Labour hold		Swing	+4.56				

2003 Electorate: 68,947
Regional ballots rejected: 172

=== Elections in the 1990s ===
Welsh Assembly Election 1999: Vale of Glamorgan
Party	Candidate	Constituency			Regional		
Party	Candidate	Votes	%	±%	Votes	%	±%
Labour	Jane Hutt	11,448	34.9	N/A	10,419	32.0	N/A
Conservative	David Melding	10,522	32.1	N/A	9,961	30.6	N/A
Plaid Cymru	Chris Franks	7,848	24.0	N/A	7,383	22.7	N/A
Liberal Democrats	Frank Little	2,938	9.0	N/A	3,298	10.1	N/A
Other list parties					1,487	4.6	
Majority		926	2.8	N/A			
Turnout		32,756	48.5	N/A			
Labour win (new seat)							

1999 Electorate: 67,577
