= Owen John Thomas =

Welsh politician (1939–2024)

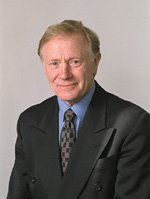
- Thomas in 1999

Member of the Welsh Assembly for South Wales Central
- In office 6 May 1999 – 3 May 2007
- Preceded by: New Assembly
- Succeeded by: Chris Franks

Personal details
- Born: 3 October 1939 Cardiff, Wales
- Died: 14 May 2024 (aged 84) Cardiff, Wales
- Party: Plaid Cymru
- Spouse: Siân Wyn Evans (m. 1985)
- Children: 6
- Education: Cardiff University

Owen John Thomas (3 October 1939 – 14 May 2024) was a Welsh Plaid Cymru politician who was a Member of the Welsh Assembly (AM) for the South Wales Central region from 1999 to 2007.

== Early life and education ==
Owen John Thomas was born in Albany Road, Cardiff, where his father, John Owen Thomas, had a pharmacy. John Owen Thomas was from Treorchy and the brother of the Alderman Reverend Degwel Thomas, the Chairman of Glamorgan County Council for 19 years. On his paternal side both his grandparents spoke Welsh and came from a prominent family of Welsh Baptists in North Pembrokeshire, including the poet-preacher Myfyr Emlyn. Thomas's mother, Evelyn Jane Thomas, came from Marros in Carmarthenshire, and her father was Welsh-speaking. Despite having Welsh-speaking grandparents Thomas's parents did not speak Welsh as adults, and therefore he and his two sisters were raised in an English-speaking home.

Thomas was a pupil at Marlborough Road School, Cardiff, and at Howardian Grammar School. He left school at sixteen to work in Cardiff Docks, and had various other jobs including as an analytical chemist. Thomas later attended the Glamorgan College of Education and the University of Wales, Cardiff, where he completed an MA in the history of the Welsh language. This formed part of his chapter in the book Iaith Carreg fy Aelwyd, published in 1998, and its English-language version.

Thomas was deputy head teacher of Gladstone Primary School before being elected to the National Assembly for Wales. He was chairman of the Cardiff region of the UCAC trade union. Thomas had been active in Plaid Cymru since his teens, filling a variety of posts from branch secretary to vice president. At the 1979 general election he stood as the Plaid Cymru candidate in Cardiff North. At the 1981 Plaid Cymru conference, he succeeded in having "socialism" included amongst the party's main aims. He was a longstanding champion of the campaign for leasehold reform and a founder member of Clwb Ifor Bach (Cardiff's Welsh-language night club), whose president he was from 1983 to 1989. He learned Welsh in his late twenties and played a key role in promoting Welsh-medium education in the city, naming several of the schools with historic Cardiff Welsh names.

== Political career ==
From 1999 to 2007 Thomas was a member of the National Assembly for Wales, representing the South Wales Central region for Plaid Cymru. He was Shadow Minister for Culture at the National Assembly for Wales. Thomas was a firm supporter of Dafydd Wigley's leadership and resisted the challenges against Wigley. Despite his strong convictions that Plaid Cymru had made a mistake in losing Wigley as party leader, Thomas remained loyal to the party whip and its new leader Ieuan Wyn Jones. Thomas faced a strong challenge for the 2003 regional seat selection, but comfortably won the membership vote.

A strong supporter of the Welsh language and the teaching of Welsh history, he wrote in the Western Mail that "The language is a national asset and its revitalisation can play a central part in the larger process of nation building and economic and social regeneration". He also complained that Welsh children are taught "the history of England, not the history of Britain".

His achievements as an AM included an unsuccessful campaign to have Saint David's Day recognised as a bank holiday, his role in the creation of the Wales Millennium Centre, and his campaigns for the Allied Steel and Wire pension fund and to bring brachytherapy, a cancer treatment, to Wales.

Thomas was the Plaid Cymru candidate for the Cathays ward in the May 2008 Cardiff local elections, increasing the vote and receiving the highest vote that Plaid Cymru has achieved in that ward. He also ran for that ward in the 1983 local election.

== Later life ==
Following retirement at the age of 67, Thomas remained active within Plaid Cymru, serving as the party's chair in Cardiff Central and in Cardiff. He was the longest-serving trustee of Tŷ'r Cymry, a house given to the Welsh speakers of Cardiff in 1936.

In November 2020 his book The Welsh Language in Cardiff: A History of Survival was published by Y Lolfa. The book is an attack on the myth that Cardiff has been an English-speaking town since the Anglo-Norman conquest of Cardiff in 1100, emphasising instead that a very significant element of its population have been Welsh-speaking throughout history.

== Personal life ==
Thomas was married to Siân Wyn Evans, a former headteacher of Ysgol Glan Morfa, Splott, from 1985. The couple had twin sons. Thomas had three sons and a daughter from a previous marriage.He has 12 grandchildren Owen,Bethan,Rhys,Megan,Daniel,Dylan, Mari,Teifion,Esther,Greta,Steffan and Elin. His youngest son Rhys ab Owen was elected on the South Wales Central regional list in the 2021 Senedd election, the same seat Thomas had represented fourteen years earlier.

In 2020, it was reported that Owen John Thomas was a resident in a care home for people living with dementia. He had lived there from 2019, having first been diagnosed with the illness in 2013.

Thomas died in Cardiff on 14 May 2024, at the age of 84.

== Offices held ==
Senedd
Preceded by (new post)	Assembly Member for South Wales Central; 1999–2007	Succeeded by Chris Franks
