= Gwlad =

Nationalist political party in Wales

- Leader: Gwyn Wigley Evans
- Founded: August 2018; 8 years ago
- Headquarters: Dalton House; 35 Chester Street; Wrexham; LL13 9AH
- Ideology: Welsh nationalism; Welsh independence
- Political position: Centre-right
- House of Commons: 0 / 32 (Welsh seats)
- Senedd: 0 / 96
- Councillors in Wales: 1 / 1,234

Website
- www.gwlad.org

Gwlad ([ɡwlaːd]; lit. 'country' or 'nation' in Welsh) is a centre-right Welsh nationalist and pro-independence political party. Its current leader is Gwyn Wigley Evans.

== Background ==
In late 2017, a preliminary meeting was held by Royston Jones in Aberystwyth over the formation of a new pro-Welsh independence party. In August 2018, Ein Gwlad (English: Our Nation) was founded in Llanelli, with Gwyn Wigley Evans as its leader. Evans said he wanted to dismantle the established and archaic UK political system that has "shackled and exploited the people of Wales for so long", whilst party member Siân Caiach claimed that "A lot of people in all parties, not just in Plaid Cymru, really would like Wales to be a better place, have a better government and have more autonomy and even independence."

In February 2019, Ein Gwlad changed its name to Gwlad Gwlad (English: Nation Nation). For the 2019 United Kingdom general election, the party announced its intention to stand candidates in the four Welsh seats where Plaid Cymru had stood down in favour of other parties taking an anti-Brexit position as part of the "Unite to Remain" pact: Brecon and Radnorshire, Cardiff Central, Montgomeryshire and the Vale of Glamorgan. Evans said: "The 'Remain Alliance' has been cooked up in London between the Lib Dems, the Greens and Plaid, without local consultation of any sort. By standing in the four constituencies, we want to give an opportunity for people to cast a vote for real Welsh independence. A large number of people asked us to step into the breach, and this is what we have done." Ultimately, the party only stood in Cardiff Central (280 votes, 0.7%), Montgomeryshire (727 votes, 2.1%) and the Vale of Glamorgan (508 votes, 0.9%).

On 24 March 2020, Gwlad Gwlad changed its name to just Gwlad.

The party stood candidates in 14 of the 40 parliamentary constituencies in the 2021 Senedd election and a full slate of four candidates in each of the five Senedd regional lists. It averaged 0.6% in the regional lists, coming tenth with no candidates elected. The same day, Gwlad also stood in the 2021 election for a Police and Crime Commissioner for the Gwent Police area. Its candidate was Clayton Jones, who is a councillor on Ynysybwl and Coed-y-cwm Community Council. He came last with 2,615 votes, representing 1.4% of the total.

On 21 September 2021, Gwlad was fined £200 by the Electoral Commission for late delivery of weekly donations and transactions reports for the 2019 UK general election, as well as the late delivery of its campaign spending return.

== Membership figures ==
	Members	Source
2023	297	
2024	471	
2025	645	

== Policies ==
Gwlad, which describes itself as "the first syncretic party in Wales", is committed to achieving full independence for Wales, including the creation of a separate currency called the Hywel. It also stated its intention to accept the result of the Brexit referendum in 2016, in which Wales voted 52% to Leave. The party wants to move the Senedd to Llandudno Junction.

Despite being labelled "a Welsh UKIP" by some critics, Gwlad claims to be neither right-wing nor left-wing, but describes itself as being committed to enterprise and free markets. Evans said that Wales "really need[s] to move away from the Westminster circus" and that his party was "working hard to promote the cause for independence by attracting the 90 per cent of Welsh electorate who do not vote for Plaid Cymru."

== Electoral performance ==
=== General elections ===
House of Commons of the United Kingdom
Year	Votes	Votes %	Seats	Change
2019	1,515 votes	0.0%	0 / 40	New party

=== Senedd elections ===
Election	Constituency			Regional			Votes	%	Total seats	+/–	Government
Election	Votes	%	Seats	Votes	%	Seats	Votes	%	Total seats	+/–	Government
2021	2,829	0.25%	0 / 20	6,776	0.61%	0 / 40			0 / 60		Extraparliamentary
2026 (Note: Starting with the 2026 election, the Senedd was increased to 96 members who are all elected through closed list proportional representation (using the D'Hondt method) in sixteen six-member constituencies)							2,479	0.20	0 / 96	Steady	Extraparliamentary

=== Local elections ===
Prior to the 2022 Welsh local elections, the party had one community councillor who was originally elected as an independent member for the Hengoed ward of the Llanelli Rural Community Council, and another community councillor, Clayton Jones, who was elected in 2017 as a Plaid Cymru member for the Lower Ward of the Ynysybwl and Coed-y-cwm Community Council in Rhondda Cynon Taf. Gwlad won a county councillor in the 2022 Welsh local elections, with Gwyn Wigley Evans being elected for the Llanrhystyd ward in the Ceredigion County Council. Evans took the seat with 39.8% of the vote, and a majority of 13.2% over the Welsh Liberal Democrats who had previously held the seat. The party also elected two members to the Ynysybwl and Coed-y-cwm Community Council: a councillor who was elected following a poll in the Lower Ward and Clayton Jones, who was elected unopposed in the Upper Ward.
