= Abolish the Welsh Assembly Party =

Welsh political party

Abolish the Welsh Assembly Party Plaid Diddymu Cynulliad Cymru (Welsh)
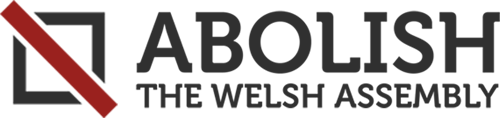
- Leader: Richard Suchorzewski
- Founded: July 2015; 11 years ago
- Headquarters: Pen-Y-Lan; Tregoyd; LD3 0SS
- Ideology: Welsh Parliament abolition; Anti-devolution; Welsh unionism
- Colours: Dark red; Red
- Local government in Wales: 0 / 1,253

Website
- abolishthewelshassemblyparty.co.uk

The Abolish the Welsh Assembly Party (Welsh: Plaid Diddymu Cynulliad Cymru), or in Wales, simply Abolish, is a registered single issue political party in Wales. It stands in opposition to devolution and campaigns for the abolition of the Senedd (Welsh Parliament; Welsh: Senedd Cymru), formerly known as the "National Assembly for Wales", the devolved legislature of Wales. Abolish advocates for devolved powers to be returned to the Secretary of State for Wales in the UK government and to the UK parliament at Westminster.

Abolish was first registered with the Electoral Commission in July 2015. It was de-registered in November 2020 because former leader David Bevan failed to renew its registration, but was then re-registered two months later. The party has not had a candidate elected to the Senedd, but it gained two members in 2019 and 2020 through defections from the UK Independence Party (UKIP), along with one council member in Powys. It lost both of its Senedd seats in the 2021 Senedd election.

== History ==
The Abolish the Welsh Assembly Party was formally registered with the Electoral Commission in July 2015 and was publicly launched in November 2015. Its sole stated aim is the abolition of the Senedd, formerly known as the National Assembly for Wales. The party nominated candidates for each of the regional lists in the 2016 Assembly elections, winning 4.4% of the regional vote and returned no seats. It did not contest any constituency seats.

Former UKIP leadership candidate Richard Suchorzewski stood in the 2019 Newport West by-election, the first time the party had nominated a candidate for a Westminster seat. Suchorzewski stated that his main aim was to raise awareness of the party's message. He campaigned on the single issue of the Welsh Assembly, claiming it was "a waste of money" and "an unnecessary tier of politics". He finished in 8th place out of 11 candidates, with 0.9% of the vote. Suchorzewski had previously stood for the Conservative Party and then for UKIP, standing for leadership of UKIP in 2006 and losing to Nigel Farage.

=== Defections to Abolish ===
The deputy chair of the Welsh Conservatives, Lee Canning, defected to the party in November 2019, claiming that his former party were not doing enough to maintain the unity of the UK. The party said it hoped Canning would stand "in a key target seat" in the 2021 Senedd election. In May 2020, Powys councillor Claire Mills quit the Welsh Conservatives and joined the party for similar reasons, becoming the party's first representative in Welsh local government.

Richard Suchorzewski became the new leader of the party in June 2020. Later in the same month Gareth Bennett, the former leader of the UKIP Senedd group and Independent MS, joined the party along with former Brexit Party parliamentary candidates Cameron Edwards and Richard Taylor.

In October 2020, a second member of the Senedd, Mark Reckless, joined the party. Reckless, who was previously the leader of the Brexit Party in Wales (and prior to that a member of UKIP, and before that a Conservative MP), stated, "we surveyed all the [Brexit] party's registered supporters to ask what they wanted for the future. Two thirds of them wanted Abolish and an end to devolution. So, I am joining the Abolish The Assembly Party to help give those opposed to devolution a proper voice in Welsh politics".

=== De-registration and re-registration ===
In November 2020, the Electoral Commission removed the party from the register of political parties. The party's former leader, David Bevan, had fallen out with the party and did not renew the party's registration. Instead, he submitted a rival Abolish the Welsh Assembly Party for registration with himself as the leader, claiming this party would be fielding candidates in the next Senedd election. A spokesman for the original party was quoted opposing the registration, warning Bevan against "stealing the party like a thief in the night". This was resolved when the Electoral Commission, in January 2021, rejected the registration of the second party saying, "We have rejected the second application on the basis that when a party is deregistered, its name is protected for a period of time by law. This means that during this time only the previously registered party can apply to use that name."

In January 2021, Abolish was reinstated on the Electoral Register by the Electoral Commission. Suchorzewski said he "[looked] forward to naming candidates to stand for Abolish in the Welsh Assembly/Senedd elections due on 6th May – or later if it's postponed due to the other parties running scared and delaying the election as far into the future as possible. We believe there are safe election solutions, however whenever the election is called we shall be ready."

=== 2021 Senedd election campaign ===
On 7 March 2021, Abolish announced that it would be running candidates in all constituencies for the 2021 Senedd election. It also said that it would run candidates on the regional list.

On 6 April, one month before election day, it was announced that 10 of the party's candidates had dropped out of the election. This included one of its two MSs, Gareth Bennett, who left to stand as an independent; the reasons for this decision were unspecified. Richard Suchorzewski was asked during the 24 April 2021 edition of BBC Politics Wales on whether 'Wales was a country'. Appearing to struggle to answer the question, he stated, "I don't understand the premise behind that question.... quite frankly" but confirmed that Wales was a country. The interviewer, BBC journalist James Williams, then asked what other countries there are that don't have a parliament. Suchorzewski paused then explained that he didn't understand the point of the question. He went on to explain that Wales voted for an Assembly, not a Parliament.

At the election, Abolish received 18,149 constituency votes and 41,399 regional votes (3.7% of the vote), a drop from its performance in 2016, and failed to win any seats.

Dr Richard Wyn Jones, Professor of Welsh Politics at Cardiff University, commented on S4C election coverage that the party's failure to win seats "earmarked something important that it not only noted in the confidence of the Labour Party but also a vote of confidence in devolution....the people of Wales have declared their faith in devolution. There was a believable option to vote for abolishing the whole thing, that has died on its arse. That has left us. That will change the nature of the discussions. A few weeks ago, there was a real possibility that the Abolish the Assembly was going to do well. The Conservatives would then react by being more in favour in abolish. There was reasons for that. I think that this election and the results on who has won and who has been destroyed should be noted as an important moment in Welsh politics".

=== 2022 local elections ===
At the 2022 Welsh local elections, only one candidate stood for Abolish, Stuart Field in the Rhoose Ward of Vale of Glamorgan. He received 430 votes but was not elected.

Abolish lost its only councillor. Claire Mills, who had joined Abolish, was re-elected as an independent in the 2022 Powys County Council election.

=== 2024 United Kingdom general election ===
In the 2024 United Kingdom general election, the party stood three candidates. Stuart Field in the Vale of Glamorgan received 669 votes (1.5% of the vote). Paul Ashton in Wrexham received 480 votes (1.2% of the vote). Jonathan Harrington contested the Brecon, Radnor, and Cwm Tawe constituency, securing 372 votes (0.8% of the vote). All of them lost their deposit.

=== 2026 Senedd election campaign ===
In March 2026 the party announced in a statement that it would not be putting forward any candidates in the 2026 Senedd election, citing changes to the electoral system and the risk of splitting the anti-devolution vote, stating that the decision followed a "careful assessment" of the new closed-list D’Hondt electoral system and the wider political landscape in Wales.

== Policies ==
The party published its manifesto for the 2021 Senedd election in April 2021. The key points were:

- Abolish the devolved Welsh government, including the position of First Minister of Wales, handing over executive powers to the relevant departments within the UK government in London
- Abolish the devolved Senedd (Welsh parliament; Welsh: Senedd Cymru) and hand over legislative powers to the UK parliament, in which 40 of the 650 MPs represent constituencies in Wales
- Integrate the NHS in Wales into the NHS in England
- Re-introduce prescription charges, currently £9.35 per item, for people in Wales aged between 17 and 64 as is the case in England
- Remove the requirement for public services in Wales to be offered bilingually in the Welsh language and scrap Welsh language revival policies and targets
- Stop compulsory Welsh language education, abolish the National Curriculum for Wales and require Welsh schools to teach the National Curriculum for England instead
- Allow schools in Wales to convert to academy status and allow the creation for free schools in Wales
- Repeal alcohol pricing laws
- Privatise Cardiff Airport
- Build an M4 relief road
- Abolish Welsh rates of income tax and restore stamp duty land tax as is the case in England
- Abolish Natural Resources Wales, reduce environmental standards for nitrate pollution and scale back rewilding projects

== Election results ==
=== General elections ===
Election	Wales		Seats	+/–	Government
Election	Votes	%	Seats	+/–	Government
2024	1,521	0.1	0 / 32	Steady	Not in Government

=== Senedd elections ===
Election	Constituency			Regional			Total seats	+/–	Government
Election	Votes	%	Seats	Votes	%	Seats	Total seats	+/–	Government
2016	Did not contest	Did not contest	0 / 40	44,286	4.4	0 / 20	0 / 60	Steady	Not in Assembly
2021	18,149	1.6	0 / 40	41,399	3.7	0 / 20	0 / 60	Steady	Not in Senedd

== See also ==
- Abolish the Scottish Parliament Party
- Devolution in Wales
