= 4th National Assembly for Wales =

4th Assembly
←	3rd Assembly	5th Assembly	→
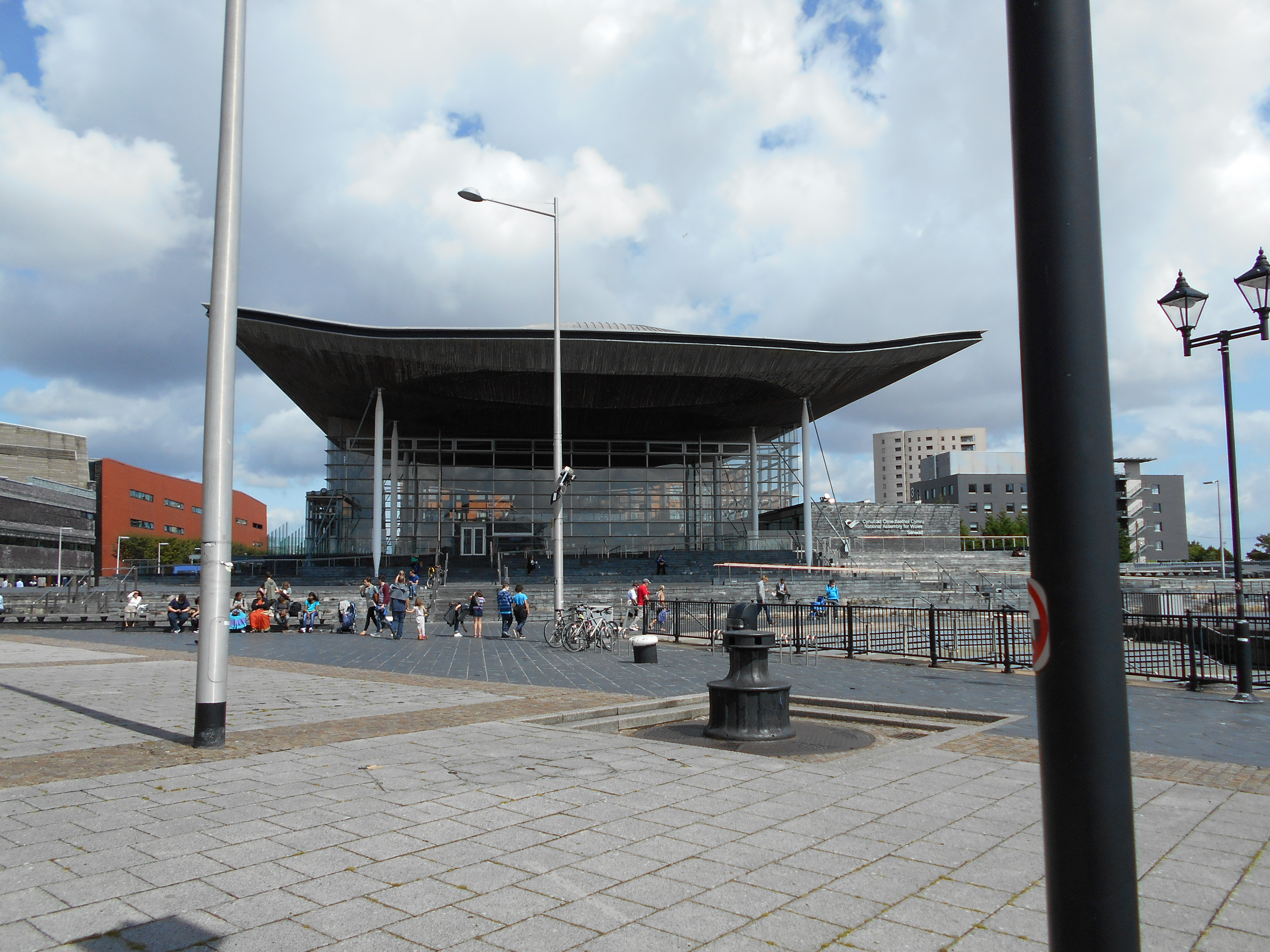
- The Welsh Assembly Building (Senedd) in 2014

Overview
- Legislative body: National Assembly for Wales
- Jurisdiction: Wales, United Kingdom
- Meeting place: Senedd building, Cardiff
- Term: 5 May 2011 – 5 May 2016
- Election: 2011 National Assembly for Wales election
- Government: Second Jones government
- Opposition: First Shadow Cabinet of Andrew R. T. Davies (2011–16)
- Members: 60
- Presiding Officer: Dafydd Elis-Thomas (2011); Rosemary Butler (2011–16)
- First Minister: Carwyn Jones

This is a list of Assembly Members (AMs; Welsh: Aelodau'r Cynulliad, ACau) elected to the fourth National Assembly for Wales at the 2011 election. There are a total of 60 members elected, 40 were elected from first past the post constituencies with a further 20 members being returned from five regions, each electing four AMs through mixed-member proportional representation. 20 AMs were elected for the first time.

== Current composition ==
Party		2011 election	Prior to 2016 election
•	Labour	30 (Note: Includes 10 MSs sponsored by the Co-operative Party, who are designated Labour and Co-operative.)	30 (Note: Includes 10 MSs sponsored by the Co-operative Party, who are designated Labour and Co-operative.)
	Conservative	14	14
	Plaid Cymru	11	11
	Liberal Democrats	5	5
	Other	0	0

Government parties denoted with bullets (•)

=== Constituency AMs ===
Seat	Member	Party	First elected	Notes
Aberavon	David Rees	Labour	2011	
Aberconwy	Janet Finch-Saunders	Conservative	2011	
Alyn and Deeside	Carl Sargeant	Labour	2007	
Arfon	Alun Ffred Jones	Plaid Cymru	2003	
Blaenau Gwent	Alun Davies	Labour Co-op	2007	
Brecon and Radnorshire	Kirsty Williams	Liberal Democrats	1999	
Bridgend	Carwyn Jones	Labour	1999	
Caerphilly	Jeffrey Cuthbert	Labour	2003	
Cardiff Central	Jenny Rathbone	Labour	2011	
Cardiff North	Julie Morgan	Labour	2011	
Cardiff South and Penarth	Vaughan Gething	Labour Co-op	2011	
Cardiff West	Mark Drakeford	Labour	2011	
Carmarthen East and Dinefwr	Rhodri Glyn Thomas	Plaid Cymru	1999	
Carmarthen West and South Pembrokeshire	Angela Burns	Conservative	2007	
Ceredigion	Elin Jones	Plaid Cymru	1999	
Clwyd South	Ken Skates	Labour	2011	
Clwyd West	Darren Millar	Conservative	2007	
Cynon Valley	Christine Chapman	Labour Co-op	1999	
Delyn	Sandy Mewies	Labour	2003	
Dwyfor Meirionnydd	Dafydd Elis-Thomas	Plaid Cymru	1999	
Gower	Edwina Hart	Labour	1999	
Islwyn	Gwyn R Price	Labour	2011	
Llanelli	Keith Davies	Labour Co-op	2011	
Merthyr Tydfil and Rhymney	Huw Lewis	Labour Co-op	1999	
Monmouth	Nick Ramsay	Conservative	2007	
Montgomeryshire	Russell George	Conservative	2011	
Neath	Gwenda Thomas	Labour	1999	
Newport East	John Griffiths	Labour Co-op	1999	
Newport West	Rosemary Butler	Labour	1999	Served as Presiding Officer 2011–2016
Ogmore	Janice Gregory	Labour	1999	
Pontypridd	Mick Antoniw	Labour Co-op	2011	
Preseli Pembrokeshire	Paul Davies	Conservative	2007	
Rhondda	Leighton Andrews	Labour	2003	
Swansea East	Mike Hedges	Labour	2011	
Swansea West	Julie James	Labour	2011	
Torfaen	Lynne Neagle	Labour Co-op	1999	
Vale of Clwyd	Ann Jones	Labour Co-op	1999	
Vale of Glamorgan	Jane Hutt	Labour	1999	
Wrexham	Lesley Griffiths	Labour	2007	
Ynys Môn	Ieuan Wyn Jones	Plaid Cymru	1999	Resigned 20 June 2013

=== Regional AMs ===
Seat	Members	Party	First elected	Notes
North Wales
North Wales	Antoinette Sandbach	Conservative	2011	Resigned 8 May 2015
North Wales	Aled Roberts	Liberal Democrats	2016	Suspended 17 May 2011 reinstated 6 July 2011
North Wales	Llyr Huws Gruffydd	Plaid Cymru	2011	
North Wales	Mark Isherwood	Conservative	2003	

Seat	Members	Party	First elected
Mid and West Wales
Mid and West Wales	William Powell	Liberal Democrats	2011
Mid and West Wales	Rebecca Evans	Labour Co-op	2011
Mid and West Wales	Simon Thomas	Plaid Cymru	2011
Mid and West Wales	Joyce Watson	Labour	2007

Seat	Members	Party	First elected	Notes
South Wales West	Suzy Davies	Conservative	2011	
South Wales West	Bethan Jenkins	Plaid Cymru	2007	Suspended and sat as an independent 15 October 2012 until Spring 2013
South Wales West	Byron Davies	Conservative	2011	Resigned 8 May 2015
South Wales West	Peter Black	Liberal Democrats	1999	

Seat	Members	Party	First elected	Notes
South Wales Central	Andrew RT Davies	Conservative	2007	
South Wales Central	David Melding	Conservative	1999	
South Wales Central	Leanne Wood	Plaid Cymru	2003	
South Wales Central	Eluned Parrott	Liberal Democrats	2011	Replaced John Dixon

Seat	Members	Party	First elected
South Wales East	Mohammad Asghar	Conservative	2007
South Wales East	William Graham	Conservative	1999
South Wales East	Jocelyn Davies	Plaid Cymru	1999
South Wales East	Lindsay Whittle	Plaid Cymru	2011

== See also ==
- 1999 National Assembly for Wales election and Members of the 1st National Assembly for Wales
- 2003 National Assembly for Wales election and Members of the 2nd National Assembly for Wales
- 2007 National Assembly for Wales election and Members of the 3rd National Assembly for Wales
- 2011 National Assembly for Wales election and Members of the 4th National Assembly for Wales
- 2016 National Assembly for Wales election and Members of the 5th National Assembly for Wales
- List of Welsh Assembly by-elections
- National Assembly for Wales constituencies and electoral regions
