= 2nd National Assembly for Wales =

2nd Assembly
←	1st Assembly	3rd Assembly	→
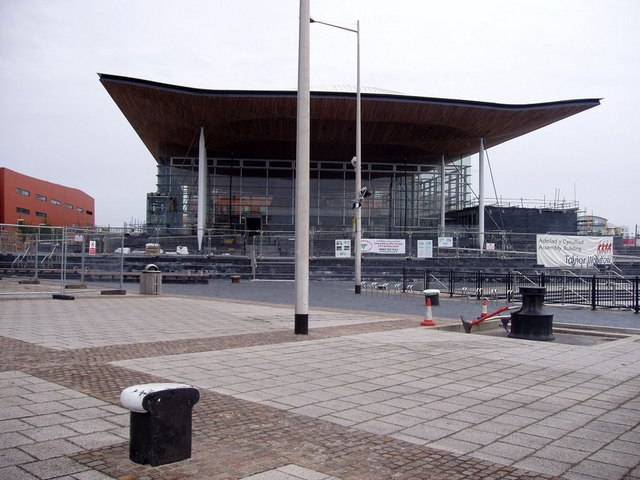
- The Welsh Assembly Building (Senedd) under construction in 2005

Overview
- Legislative body: National Assembly for Wales
- Jurisdiction: Wales, United Kingdom
- Meeting place: Senedd building, Cardiff
- Term: 1 May 2003 – 3 May 2007
- Election: 2003 National Assembly for Wales election
- Government: Second Morgan government (2003–07)
- Opposition: Shadow Cabinet of Ieuan Wyn Jones (2003–07)
- Members: 60
- Presiding Officer: Dafydd Elis-Thomas (2003–07)
- First Minister: Rhodri Morgan (2003–07)

This is a list of Assembly Members (AMs; Welsh: Aelodau'r Cynulliad, ACau) elected to the second National Assembly for Wales at the 2003 election, the second such contest since Devolution. There are a total of 60 members elected, 40 were elected from first past the post constituencies with a further 20 members being returned from five regions, each electing four AMs through mixed-member proportional representation.

== Composition of the Assembly ==
Party		2003 election	Prior to 2007 election
•	Labour	30 (Note: Includes 5 MSs sponsored by the Co-operative Party, who are designated Labour and Co-operative.)	29
	Plaid Cymru	12	12
	Conservative	11	11
	Liberal Democrats	6	6
	Independent	0	1
Total		60	60

Government parties denoted with bullets (•)

== AMs by party ==
This is a list of AMs elected in 2003.

Party	Name	Constituency or region
Labour (29)	Leighton Andrews	Rhondda
Labour (29)	Lorraine Barrett	Cardiff South and Penarth
Labour (29)	Rosemary Butler	Newport West
Labour (29)	Christine Chapman	Cynon Valley
Labour (29)	Jeffrey Cuthbert	Caerphilly
Labour (29)	Jane Davidson	Pontypridd
Labour (29)	Andrew Davies	Swansea West
Labour (29)	Tamsin Dunwoody	Preseli Pembrokeshire
Labour (29)	Sue Essex	Cardiff North
Labour (29)	Brian Gibbons	Aberavon
Labour (29)	Janice Gregory	Ogmore
Labour (29)	John Griffiths	Newport East
Labour (29)	Christine Gwyther	Carmarthen West and South Pembrokeshire
Labour (29)	Edwina Hart	Gower
Labour (29)	Jane Hutt	Vale of Glamorgan
Labour (29)	Irene James	Islwyn
Labour (29)	Ann Jones	Vale of Clwyd
Labour (29)	Carwyn Jones	Bridgend
Labour (29)	Peter Law	Blaenau Gwent
Labour (29)	Huw Lewis	Merthyr Tydfil and Rhymney
Labour (29)	Val Lloyd	Swansea East
Labour (29)	Sandy Mewies	Delyn
Labour (29)	Rhodri Morgan	Cardiff West
Labour (29)	Lynne Neagle	Torfaen
Labour (29)	Alun Pugh	Clwyd West
Labour (29)	Carl Sargeant	Alyn and Deeside
Labour (29)	Karen Sinclair	Clwyd South
Labour (29)	Catherine Thomas	Llanelli
Labour (29)	Gwenda Thomas	Neath
Plaid Cymru (12)		
Plaid Cymru (12)	Janet Davies	South Wales West
Plaid Cymru (12)	Jocelyn Davies	South Wales East
Plaid Cymru (12)	Alun Ffred Jones	Caernarfon
Plaid Cymru (12)	Denise Idris Jones	Conwy
Plaid Cymru (12)	Elin Jones	Ceredigion
Plaid Cymru (12)	Helen Mary Jones	Mid and West Wales
Plaid Cymru (12)	Ieuan Wyn Jones	Ynys Môn
Plaid Cymru (12)	David Lloyd	South Wales West
Plaid Cymru (12)	Janet Ryder	North Wales
Plaid Cymru (12)	Owen John Thomas	South Wales Central
Plaid Cymru (12)	Rhodri Glyn Thomas	Carmarthen East and Dinefwr
Plaid Cymru (12)	Leanne Wood	South Wales Central
Conservative (11)		
Conservative (11)	Nick Bourne	Mid and West Wales
Conservative (11)	Alun Cairns	South Wales West
Conservative (11)	David Davies	Monmouth
Conservative (11)	Glyn Davies	Mid and West Wales
Conservative (11)	Lisa Francis	Mid and West Wales
Conservative (11)	William Graham	South Wales East
Conservative (11)	Mark Isherwood	North Wales
Conservative (11)	Laura Anne Jones	South Wales East
Conservative (11)	David Melding	South Wales Central
Conservative (11)	Jonathan Morgan	South Wales Central
Conservative (11)	Brynle Williams	North Wales
Liberal Democrats (6)		
Liberal Democrats (6)	Mick Bates	Montgomeryshire
Liberal Democrats (6)	Peter Black	South Wales West
Liberal Democrats (6)	Mike German	South Wales East
Liberal Democrats (6)	Christine Humphreys	North Wales
Liberal Democrats (6)	Jenny Randerson	Cardiff Central
Liberal Democrats (6)	Kirsty Williams	Brecon and Radnorshire
JMIP (1)	John Marek	Wrexham
Presiding Officer (1)	Dafydd Elis-Thomas	Meirionnydd Nant Conwy

== Members by constituency and region ==
=== Constituency members ===
Assembly member
Constituency	Name	Party
Aberavon	Brian Gibbons	Labour
Alyn and Deeside	Carl Sargeant	Labour
Blaenau Gwent	Peter Law	Labour
Brecon and Radnorshire	Kirsty Williams	Liberal Democrats
Bridgend	Carwyn Jones	Labour
Caernarfon	Alun Ffred Jones	Plaid Cymru
Caerphilly	Jeffrey Cuthbert	Labour
Cardiff Central	Jenny Randerson	Liberal Democrats
Cardiff North	Sue Essex	Labour
Cardiff South and Penarth	Lorraine Barrett	Labour Co-op
Cardiff West	Rhodri Morgan	Labour
Carmarthen East and Dinefwr	Rhodri Glyn Thomas	Plaid Cymru
Carmarthen West and South Pembrokeshire	Christine Gwyther	Labour
Ceredigion	Elin Jones	Plaid Cymru
Clwyd South	Karen Sinclair	Labour
Clwyd West	Alun Pugh	Labour
Conwy	Denise Idris Jones	Labour
Cynon Valley	Christine Chapman	Labour Co-op
Delyn	Sandy Mewies	Labour
Gower	Edwina Hart	Labour
Islwyn	Irene James	Labour
Llanelli	Catherine Thomas	Labour
Meirionnydd Nant Conwy	Dafydd Elis-Thomas (Presiding Officer)	Plaid Cymru
Merthyr Tydfil and Rhymney	Huw Lewis	Labour Co-op
Monmouth	David Davies	Conservative
Montgomeryshire	Mick Bates	Liberal Democrats
Neath	Gwenda Thomas	Labour
Newport East	John Griffiths	Labour Co-op
Newport West	Rosemary Butler	Labour
Ogmore	Janice Gregory	Labour
Pontypridd	Jane Davidson	Labour
Preseli Pembrokeshire	Tamsin Dunwoody	Labour
Rhondda	Leighton Andrews	Labour
Swansea East	Val Lloyd	Labour
Swansea West	Andrew Davies	Labour
Torfaen	Lynne Neagle	Labour Co-op
Vale of Clwyd	Ann Jones	Labour
Vale of Glamorgan	Jane Hutt	Labour
Wrexham	John Marek	JMIP
Ynys Môn	Ieuan Wyn Jones	Plaid Cymru

=== Regional members ===
Assembly member
Region	Name	Party
North Wales
North Wales	Eleanor Burnham	Liberal Democrats
North Wales	Mark Isherwood	Conservative
North Wales	Janet Ryder	Plaid Cymru
North Wales	Brynle Williams	Conservative
Mid and West Wales
Mid and West Wales	Nick Bourne	Conservative
Mid and West Wales	Cynog Dafis	Plaid Cymru
Mid and West Wales	Glyn Davies	Conservative
Mid and West Wales	Lisa Francis	Conservative
South Wales West
South Wales West	Peter Black	Liberal Democrats
South Wales West	Alun Cairns	Conservative
South Wales West	Janet Davies	Plaid Cymru
South Wales West	David Lloyd	Plaid Cymru
South Wales Central
South Wales Central	David Melding	Conservative
South Wales Central	Jonathan Morgan	Conservative
South Wales Central	Owen John Thomas	Plaid Cymru
South Wales Central	Leanne Wood	Plaid Cymru
South Wales East
South Wales East	Jocelyn Davies	Plaid Cymru
South Wales East	Michael German	Liberal Democrats
South Wales East	William Graham	Conservative
South Wales East	Laura Anne Jones	Conservative

== See also ==
- Government of the 2nd National Assembly for Wales
- 2003 National Assembly for Wales election
