= South Wales East (Senedd electoral region) =

Senedd electoral region (1999–2026)

- Dwyrain De Cymru (Welsh)
- Former Multi-member electoral region for the Senedd
- Map of South Wales East, with constituencies numbered alphabetically. Inset within Wales shown to the top-left with the four regional seats.
Interactive map
Interactive map of the constituency.
- Preserved counties: Gwent; Mid Glamorgan (part)

Former Multi-member electoral region
- Created: 1999
- Abolished: 2026
- Number of members: 12; 8 constituency; 4 regional
- MSs (last elected in 2021): Labour (7); Conservative (2); Plaid Cymru (2); Reform UK (1)
- Constituencies: 1. Blaenau Gwent; 2. Caerphilly; 3. Islwyn; 4. Merthyr Tydfil and Rhymney; 5. Monmouth; 6. Newport East; 7. Newport West; 8. Torfaen

South Wales East (Welsh: Dwyrain De Cymru) was an electoral region of the Senedd, consisting of eight constituencies. The region elected 12 members, eight directly elected constituency members and four additional members. The electoral region was first used in 1999, when the National Assembly for Wales was created.

Each constituency elected one Member of the Senedd by the first past the post electoral system, and the region as a whole elected four additional or top-up Members of the Senedd, to create a degree of proportional representation. The additional member seats were allocated from closed lists by the D'Hondt method, with constituency results being taken into account in the allocation.

== County boundaries ==
Map of the boundaries prior to abolition

The region covered the whole of the preserved county of Gwent and part of the preserved county of Mid Glamorgan. The rest of Mid Glamorgan was mostly within the South Wales Central electoral region and partly within the South Wales West region.

== Electoral region profile ==
The region was one of contrasts; it included the city of Newport, along with the town of Caerphilly. It also took in the working-class former iron town of Merthyr Tydfil, one of the most deprived towns in the UK, but also rural Monmouthshire, one of the most affluent parts of Wales.

== Constituencies ==
The eight constituencies had the names and boundaries of constituencies of the House of Commons of the Parliament of the United Kingdom (Westminster):

| Constituency | 2021 result | Preserved counties |
|---|---|---|
| Blaenau Gwent | Alun Davies; Labour | Entirely within Gwent |
| Caerphilly | Hefin David; Labour | Entirely within Gwent |
| Islwyn | Rhianon Passmore; Labour | Entirely within Gwent |
| Merthyr Tydfil and Rhymney | Dawn Bowden; Labour | Partly Gwent partly Mid Glamorgan |
| Monmouth | Peter Fox; Conservative | Entirely within Gwent |
| Newport East | John Griffiths; Labour & Co-operative | Entirely within Gwent |
| Newport West | Jayne Bryant; Labour | Entirely within Gwent |
| Torfaen | Lynne Neagle; Labour | Entirely within Gwent |

== Assembly members and Members of the Senedd ==
=== Constituency AMs and MSs ===
| Term | Election | Blaenau Gwent | Caerphilly | Islwyn | Merthyr Tydfil and Rhymney | Monmouth | Newport East | Newport West | Torfaen |
|---|---|---|---|---|---|---|---|---|---|
| 1st | 1999 | Peter Law (Lab) (later Ind) | Ron Davies (Lab) | Brian Hancock (PC) | Huw Lewis (Lab) | David TC Davies (Con) | John Griffiths (Lab) | Rosemary Butler (Lab) | Lynne Neagle (Lab) |
| 2nd | 2003 | Peter Law (Lab) (later Ind) | Jeffrey Cuthbert (Lab) | Irene James (Lab) | Huw Lewis (Lab) | David TC Davies (Con) | John Griffiths (Lab) | Rosemary Butler (Lab) | Lynne Neagle (Lab) |
| 2nd | 2005 (Note: In 2005 Peter Law left the Labour Party in a row over candidate selection in Blaenau Gwent for that year's UK general election.) | Peter Law (Lab) (later Ind) | Jeffrey Cuthbert (Lab) | Irene James (Lab) | Huw Lewis (Lab) | David TC Davies (Con) | John Griffiths (Lab) | Rosemary Butler (Lab) | Lynne Neagle (Lab) |
| 2nd | 2006 | Trish Law (PV) | Jeffrey Cuthbert (Lab) | Irene James (Lab) | Huw Lewis (Lab) | David TC Davies (Con) | John Griffiths (Lab) | Rosemary Butler (Lab) | Lynne Neagle (Lab) |
| 3rd | 2007 | Trish Law (PV) | Jeffrey Cuthbert (Lab) | Irene James (Lab) | Huw Lewis (Lab) | Nick Ramsay (Con) | John Griffiths (Lab) | Rosemary Butler (Lab) | Lynne Neagle (Lab) |
| 4th | 2011 | Alun Davies (Lab) | Jeffrey Cuthbert (Lab) | Gwyn Price (Lab) | Huw Lewis (Lab) | Nick Ramsay (Con) | John Griffiths (Lab) | Rosemary Butler (Lab) | Lynne Neagle (Lab) |
| 5th | 2016 | Alun Davies (Lab) | Hefin David (Lab) | Rhianon Passmore (Lab) | Dawn Bowden (Lab) | Nick Ramsay (Con) | John Griffiths (Lab) | Jayne Bryant (Lab) | Lynne Neagle (Lab) |
| 6th | 2021 | Alun Davies (Lab) | Hefin David (Lab) | Rhianon Passmore (Lab) | Dawn Bowden (Lab) | Peter Fox (Con) | John Griffiths (Lab) | Jayne Bryant (Lab) | Lynne Neagle (Lab) |

=== Regional list AMs and MSs ===
N.B. This table is for presentation purposes only

| Term | Election | AM / MS | AM / MS | AM / MS | AM / MS |
|---|---|---|---|---|---|
| 1st | 1999 | Phil Williams (PC) | William Graham (Con) | Jocelyn Davies (PC) | Mike German (LD) |
| 2nd | 2003 | Laura Anne Jones (Con) | William Graham (Con) | Jocelyn Davies (PC) | Mike German (LD) |
| 3rd | 2007 | Mohammad Asghar (PC) (later Con) (Note: Mohammad Asghar defected from Plaid Cymru to the Welsh Conservatives on 8 December 2009) | William Graham (Con) | Jocelyn Davies (PC) | Mike German (LD) |
| 3rd | 2009 | Mohammad Asghar (PC) (later Con) | William Graham (Con) | Jocelyn Davies (PC) | Mike German (LD) |
| 3rd | 2010 | Mohammad Asghar (PC) (later Con) | William Graham (Con) | Jocelyn Davies (PC) | Veronica German (LD) |
| 4th | 2011 | Mohammad Asghar (PC) (later Con) | William Graham (Con) | Jocelyn Davies (PC) | Lindsay Whittle (PC) |
| 5th | 2016 | Mohammad Asghar (PC) (later Con) | Mark Reckless (UKIP) (later Con, Ind, BREX then Abolish) (Note: In 2017, Mark Reckless left UKIP and was admitted to the Conservative group in the Welsh Assembly, though not to the Conservative Party itself. For purposes of Assembly business, he was treated as a Conservative AM. In 2019, Reckless left the Conservative Group to sit as an independent assemblymember.) | David Rowlands (UKIP) (later BREX, then Ind.) (Note: David Rowlands is still a member of the Brexit Party, but part of the Senedd Group 'Independent Group for Reform') | Steffan Lewis (PC) |
| 5th | 2017 | Mohammad Asghar (PC) (later Con) | Mark Reckless (UKIP) (later Con, Ind, BREX then Abolish) | David Rowlands (UKIP) (later BREX, then Ind.) | Steffan Lewis (PC) |
| 5th | 2019 | Mohammad Asghar (PC) (later Con) | Mark Reckless (UKIP) (later Con, Ind, BREX then Abolish) | David Rowlands (UKIP) (later BREX, then Ind.) | Delyth Jewell (PC) (Note: Steffan Lewis died on 11 January 2019 and was replaced five days later by Delyth Jewell, the next Plaid Cymru candidate on the list.) |
| 5th | 2020 | Laura Anne Jones (Con) (later Reform) (Note: On 2 July 2020, Laura Anne Jones was confirmed as the new MS for South Wales East after the death of Mohammad Asghar. On 22 July 2025, Jones announced at the Royal Welsh Show that she had left the Welsh Conservative Party and joined Reform UK.) | Mark Reckless (UKIP) (later Con, Ind, BREX then Abolish) | David Rowlands (UKIP) (later BREX, then Ind.) | Delyth Jewell (PC) |
| 6th | 2021 | Laura Anne Jones (Con) (later Reform) | Natasha Asghar (Con) | Peredur Owen Griffiths (PC) | Delyth Jewell (PC) |
| 6th | 2025 | Laura Anne Jones (Con) (later Reform) | Natasha Asghar (Con) | Peredur Owen Griffiths (PC) | Delyth Jewell (PC) |

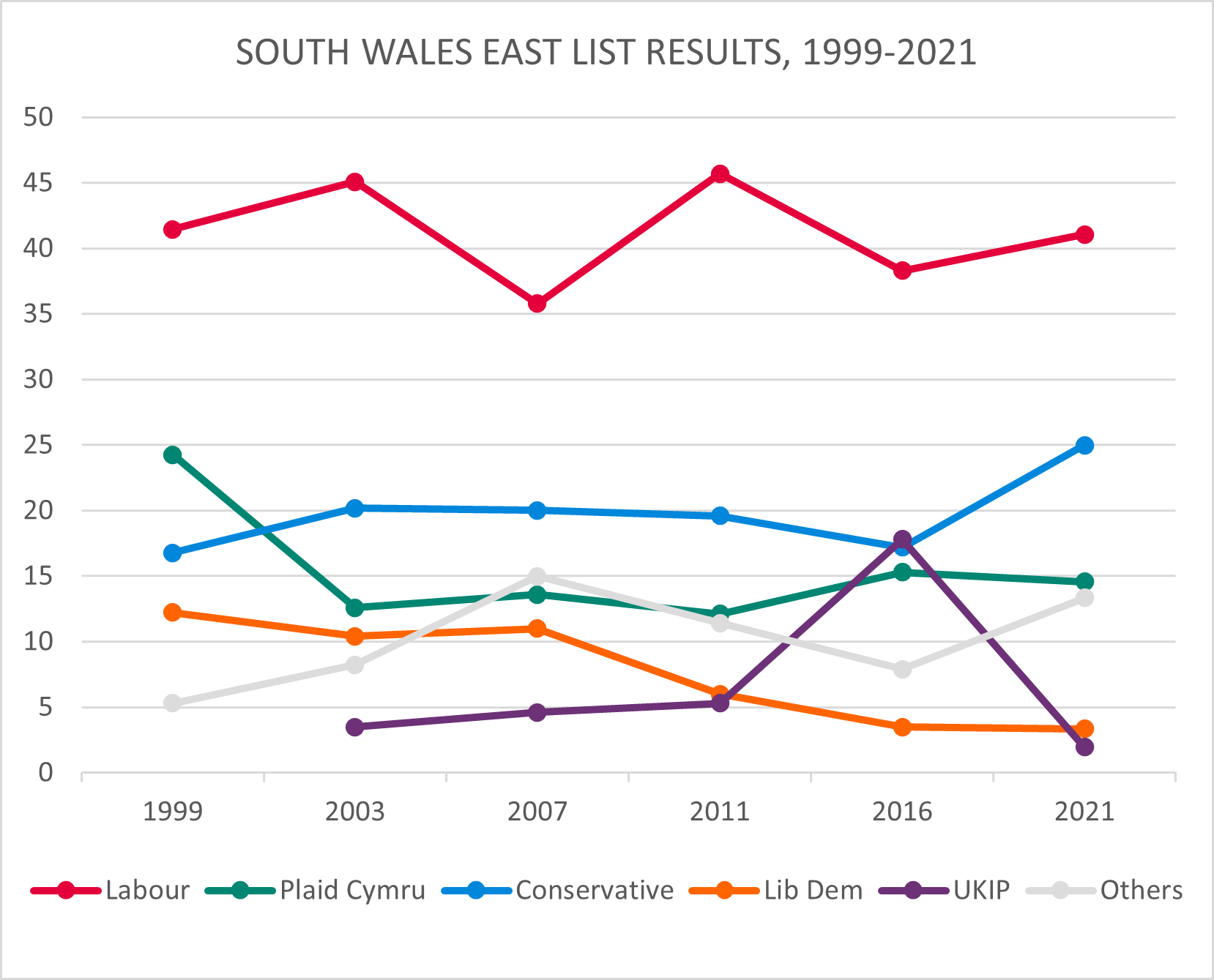
Election results since 1999 (parties who never got >5% counted as others)

== 2021 Senedd election ==
2021 Senedd election: South Wales East
| List | Candidates | Votes | Of total (%) | ± from prev. |
|---|---|---|---|---|
| Labour | Helen Cunningham, Peter Jones, Mary Brocklesby, Majid Rahman | 85,988 | 41.4 | ▲3.1 |
| Conservative | Laura Anne Jones, Natasha Asghar, Matthew Evans, Nick Evans, Gavin Chambers, Edward Dawson, Donna Gavin, Gareth Hughes | 52,323 | 25.2 | ▲8.0 |
| Plaid Cymru | Delyth Jewell, Peredur Owen Griffiths, Lindsay Whittle, Rhys Mills, Jonathan Clark, Ian Gwynne, Daniel Llewelyn | 30,530 | 14.7 | ▼0.6 |
| Abolish | Mark Reckless, Richard Taylor, Stephen Jones, Michael Ford, Robert Steed, Hugh Hughes | 9,995 | 4.8 | ▲0.7 |
| Green | Amelia Womack, Ian Chandler, Lauren James, Stephen Priestnall | 9,950 | 4.8 | ▲2.3 |
| Liberal Democrats | Jo Watkins, Veronica German, Oliver Townsend, Jeremy Becker | 7,045 | 3.4 | ▼0.1 |
| UKIP | Neil Hamilton, Benjamin Walker, Thomas Harrison, Robert James | 4,101 | 2.0 | ▼15.8 |
| Reform | James Wells, Kirsty Walmsley, David Rowlands, Colin Jones, Robert Beavis | 2,756 | 1.3 | ▲1.3 |
| Gwlad | Calen Jones, Laurence Williams, Ryan Williams, Terry Beverton | 1,841 | 0.9 | ▲0.9 |
| No More Lockdowns | Gruff Meredith, Mattie Ginsburg | 1,496 | 0.7 | ▲0.7 |
| Propel | Kieran Gething, Anthony Nash, Celia Jones, Kristopher Ashley | 924 | 0.4 | ▲0.4 |
| Communist | Robert Griffiths, Bob Davenport, Glenn Eynon, Irene Green | 606 | 0.3 | 0.0 |
| TUSC | Mariam Kamish, Cammilla Mngaza, Melanie Benedict, Dave Reid | 362 | 0.2 | ▼0.1 |

== 2021 Senedd election additional members ==
| Party | Constituency seats | List votes (vote %) | D'Hondt entitlement | Additional members elected | Total members elected | Deviation from D'Hondt entitlement |
|---|---|---|---|---|---|---|
| Labour | 7 | 85,988 (41.05%) | 6 | 0 | 7 | +1 |
| Conservative | 1 | 52,323 (24.98%) | 4 | 2 | 3 | -1 |
| Plaid Cymru | 0 | 30,530 (14.57%) | 2 | 2 | 2 | 0 |
| Abolish | 0 | 9,995 (4.77%) | 0 | 0 | 0 | 0 |
| Green | 0 | 9,950 (4.75%) | 0 | 0 | 0 | 0 |
| Liberal Democrats | 0 | 7,045 (3.36%) | 0 | 0 | 0 | 0 |
| UKIP | 0 | 4,101 (1.96%) | 0 | 0 | 0 | 0 |
| Reform | 0 | 2,756 (1.32%) | 0 | 0 | 0 | 0 |
| Gwlad | 0 | 1,841 (0.88%) | 0 | 0 | 0 | 0 |
| No More Lockdowns | 0 | 1,496 (0.71%) | 0 | 0 | 0 | 0 |
| Propel | 0 | 924 (0.44%) | 0 | 0 | 0 | 0 |
| Communist | 0 | 606 (0.29%) | 0 | 0 | 0 | 0 |
| TUSC | 0 | 362 (0.17%) | 0 | 0 | 0 | 0 |

=== Regional MSs elected 2021 ===
| Party | Name |
|---|---|
| Plaid Cymru | Delyth Jewell |
| Conservative | Laura Anne Jones |
| Conservative | Natasha Asghar |
| Plaid Cymru | Peredur Owen Griffiths |

== 2016 Welsh Assembly election additional members ==
| Party | Constituency seats | List votes (vote %) | D'Hondt entitlement | Additional members elected | Total members elected | Deviation from D'Hondt entitlement |
|---|---|---|---|---|---|---|
| Labour | 7 | 74,424 (38.3%) | 6 | 0 | 7 | +1 |
| UKIP | 0 | 34,524 (17.8%) | 2 | 2 | 2 | 0 |
| Conservative | 1 | 33,318 (17.2%) | 2 | 1 | 2 | 0 |
| Plaid Cymru | 0 | 29,626 (15.3%) | 2 | 1 | 1 | -1 |
| Abolish | 0 | 7,870 (4.1%) | 0 | 0 | 0 | 0 |
| Liberal Democrats | 0 | 6,784 (3.5%) | 0 | 0 | 0 | 0 |
| Green | 0 | 4,831 (2.5%) | 0 | 0 | 0 | 0 |
| Monster Raving Loony | 0 | 1,115 (0.6%) | 0 | 0 | 0 | 0 |
| TUSC | 0 | 618 (0.3%) | 0 | 0 | 0 | 0 |
| Communist | 0 | 492 (0.2%) | 0 | 0 | 0 | 0 |
| National Front | 0 | 429 (0.2%) | 0 | 0 | 0 | 0 |

=== Regional AMs elected 2016 ===
| Party | Name |
|---|---|
| UKIP | Mark Reckless |
| UKIP | David Rowlands |
| Conservative | Mohammad Asghar |
| Plaid Cymru | Steffan Lewis |

== 2011 Welsh Assembly election additional members ==
| Party | Constituency seats | List votes (vote %) | D'Hondt entitlement | Additional members elected | Total members elected | Deviation from D'Hondt entitlement |
|---|---|---|---|---|---|---|
| Labour | 7 | 82,699 (45.7%) | 7 | 0 | 7 | 0 |
| Conservative | 1 | 35,459 (19.6%) | 3 | 2 | 3 | 0 |
| Plaid Cymru | 0 | 21,851 (12.1%) | 2 | 2 | 2 | 0 |
| Liberal Democrats | 0 | 10,798 (6.0%) | 0 | 0 | 0 | 0 |
| UKIP | 0 | 9,526 (5.3%) | 0 | 0 | 0 | 0 |
| BNP | 0 | 6,485 (3.6%) | 0 | 0 | 0 | 0 |
| Green | 0 | 4,857 (2.7%) | 0 | 0 | 0 | 0 |
| Socialist Labour | 0 | 4,427 (2.4%) | 0 | 0 | 0 | 0 |
| Welsh Christian | 0 | 2,441 (1.3%) | 0 | 0 | 0 | 0 |
| English Democrat | 0 | 1,904 (1.1%) | 0 | 0 | 0 | 0 |
| Communist | 0 | 578 (0.3%) | 0 | 0 | 0 | 0 |

=== Regional AMs elected 2011 ===
| Party | Name |
|---|---|
| Conservative | Mohammad Asghar |
| Conservative | William Graham |
| Plaid Cymru | Jocelyn Davies |
| Plaid Cymru | Lindsay Whittle |

== 2007 Welsh Assembly election additional members ==
| Party | Constituency seats | List votes (vote %) | D'Hondt entitlement | Additional members elected | Total members elected | Deviation from D'Hondt entitlement |
|---|---|---|---|---|---|---|
| Labour | 6 | 67,998 (35.8%) | 6 | 0 | 6 | 0 |
| Conservative | 1 | 37,935 (20.0%) | 3 | 1 | 2 | −1 |
| Plaid Cymru | 0 | 25,915 (13.6%) | 2 | 2 | 2 | 0 |
| Liberal Democrats | 0 | 20,947 (11.0%) | 1 | 1 | 1 | 0 |
| BNP | 0 | 8,940 (4.7%) | 0 | 0 | 0 | 0 |
| UKIP | 0 | 8,725 (4.6%) | 0 | 0 | 0 | 0 |
| Green | 0 | 5,414 (2.8%) | 0 | 0 | 0 | 0 |
| Independent | 1 | 4,876 (2.6%) | 0 | 0 | 1 | +1 |
| Socialist Labour | 0 | 3,694 (1.9%) | 0 | 0 | 0 | 0 |
| Welsh Christian | 0 | 2,498 (1.3%) | 0 | 0 | 0 | 0 |
| English Democrat | 0 | 1,655 (0.9%) | 0 | 0 | 0 | 0 |
| Communist | 0 | 979 (0.5%) | 0 | 0 | 0 | 0 |
| CPA | 0 | 489 (0.3%) | 0 | 0 | 0 | 0 |

On 8 December 2009, Mohammad Asghar, Plaid Cymru's list member for South Wales East, defected to the Conservative Party. This gave Plaid one AM, and the Conservatives two.

== 2003 Welsh Assembly additional members ==
| Party | Constituency seats | List votes (vote %) | D'Hondt entitlement | Additional members elected | Total members elected | Deviation from D'Hondt entitlement |
|---|---|---|---|---|---|---|
| Labour | 7 | 76,522 (45.08%) | 7 | 0 | 7 | 0 |
| Conservative | 1 | 34,231 (20.17%) | 3 | 2 | 3 | 0 |
| Plaid Cymru | 0 | 21,384 (12.60%) | 1 | 1 | 1 | 0 |
| Liberal Democrats | 0 | 17,661 (10.41%) | 1 | 1 | 1 | 0 |
| UKIP | 0 | 5,949 (3.50%) | 0 | 0 | 0 | 0 |
| Green | 0 | 5,291 (3.12%) | 0 | 0 | 0 | 0 |
| Socialist Labour | 0 | 3,695 (2.18%) | 0 | 0 | 0 | 0 |
| BNP | 0 | 3,210 (1.89%) | 0 | 0 | 0 | 0 |
| Cymru Annibynnol | 0 | 1,226 (0.72%) | 0 | 0 | 0 | 0 |
| ProLife Alliance | 0 | 562 (0.33%) | 0 | 0 | 0 | 0 |

== 1999 Welsh Assembly additional members ==
| Party | Constituency seats | List votes (vote %) | D'Hondt entitlement | Additional members elected | Total members elected | Deviation from D'Hondt entitlement |
|---|---|---|---|---|---|---|
| Labour | 6 | 83,953 (41.45%) | 6 | 0 | 6 | 0 |
| Plaid Cymru | 1 | 49,139 (24.26%) | 3 | 2 | 3 | 0 |
| Conservative | 1 | 33,947 (16.76%) | 2 | 1 | 2 | 0 |
| Liberal Democrats | 0 | 24,757 (12.22%) | 1 | 1 | 1 | 0 |
| Socialist Labour | 0 | 4,879 (2.41%) | 0 | 0 | 0 | 0 |
| Green | 0 | 4,055 (2.00%) | 0 | 0 | 0 | 0 |
| Socialist Alliance | 0 | 903 (0.45%) | 0 | 0 | 0 | 0 |
| Natural Law | 0 | 898 (0.44%) | 0 | 0 | 0 | 0 |
