= Llywydd of the Senedd =

Speaker of the Senedd (Welsh Parliament)

- Llywydd Senedd Cymru
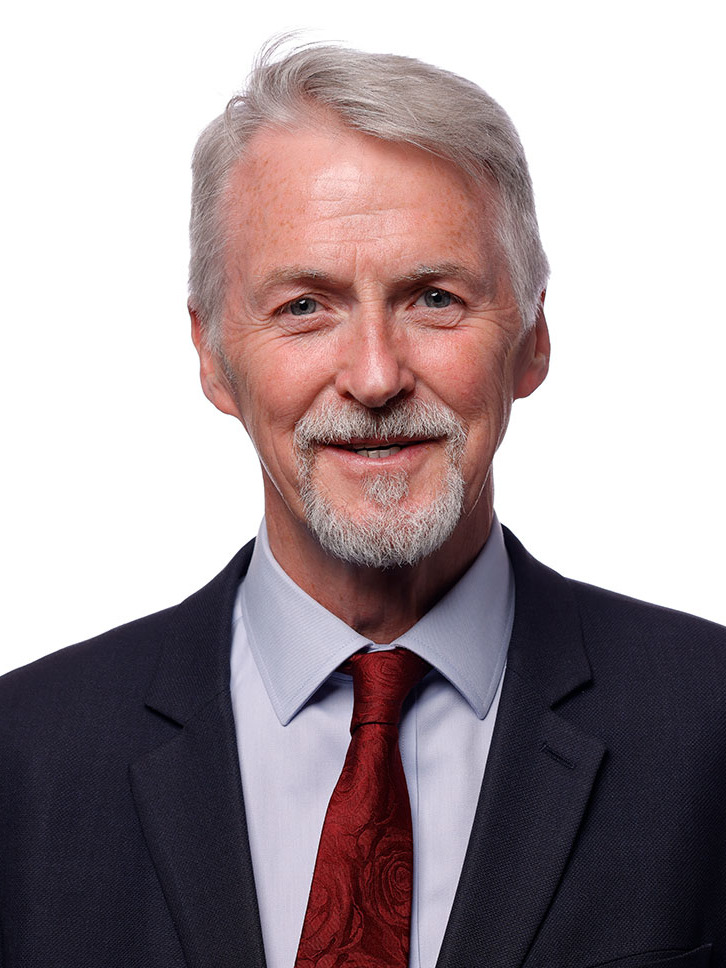
- Incumbent; Huw Irranca-Davies since 12 May 2026
- Senedd
- Style: Llywydd (within Parliament); The Right Honourable (formal)
- Appointer: Senedd (elected by)
- Term length: No limits imposed
- Inaugural holder: Dafydd Elis-Thomas; 12 May 1999
- Formation: 1999
- Unofficial names: Presiding Officer of the Senedd; Llywydd / Presiding Officer of the Welsh Parliament
- Deputy: Kerry Ferguson
- Website: https://senedd.wales/senedd-business/llywydd/

The Llywydd (Welsh: [ˈɬəu̯.ɪð]), or Presiding Officer in English, is the speaker of the Senedd in Wales, elected by members of the Senedd to chair their meetings (plenary sessions); to maintain order; and to protect the rights of Members.

The Llywydd also heads the Corporate Body (known as the Senedd Commission) and as such is viewed as a figurehead for the entire organisation. At least one Deputy Presiding Officer (Welsh: Dirprwy Lywydd; also known as a Deputy Llywydd), and up to two, are also elected to help fulfil the role. The office of the Llywydd is based in Tŷ Hywel and is also responsible for the Pierhead Building in Cardiff Bay. In their roles, neither the Llywydd nor the Deputy Presiding Officer(s) are allowed to participate in Senedd votes, except where legislation requires those votes to be passed by two-thirds of all Members.

== Role of the Llywydd ==
The main function is to chair plenary sessions of the Senedd, to maintain order and to protect the rights of Members. They are responsible for ensuring that business is handled on the basis of equality and impartiality.

The Llywydd, as Chair of the Business Committee, is also responsible for recommending changes to Standing Orders and is the final authority on their interpretation. The Llywydd also acts as Chair of the Senedd Commission, and has special responsibility for promoting democratic engagement, leadership, developing the Senedd's future legislative powers and external relations.

The Llywydd also normally facilitates the Chairs' Forum, where cross-cutting issues relating to subject committees are discussed. In addition to this, the Llywydd acts as the ambassador for the Senedd, attending speakers' conferences and other events in order to publicise and raise the profile of the Senedd.

== Llywydd's Committee ==
The statutory role of the Llywydd's Committee is to scrutinise the financial estimates of the Electoral Commission, as relates to devolved elections and referendums. During the Sixth Senedd, it was chaired by the Deputy Presiding Officer, David Rees.

== List of Llywyddion and Deputy Presiding Officers ==
=== Current Llywydd and Deputy Presiding Officer ===
Position	Current holder	Term started	Political party	Constituency
Llywydd (Presiding Officer)	Huw Irranca-Davies MS	12 May 2026	Labour	Afan Ogwr Rhondda
Deputy Presiding Officer	Kerry Ferguson MS	12 May 2026	Plaid Cymru	Ceredigion Penfro

=== List of Llywyddion (Presiding Officers) ===
Name	Picture	Entered office	Left office	Political party
Dafydd Elis-Thomas, Lord Elis-Thomas AM		12 May 1999	11 May 2011	Plaid Cymru
Rosemary Butler AM		11 May 2011	11 May 2016	Labour
Elin Jones MS		11 May 2016	12 May 2026	Plaid Cymru
Huw Irranca-Davies MS		12 May 2026	Incumbent	Labour

=== List of Deputy Presiding Officers ===
Name	Picture	Entered office	Left office	Political party
Jane Davidson AM		12 May 1999	17 October 2000	Labour
John Marek AM		19 October 2000	7 May 2003	Labour
John Marek AM		7 May 2003	9 May 2007	Forward Wales
Rosemary Butler AM		9 May 2007	11 May 2011	Labour
David Melding AM		11 May 2011	11 May 2016	Conservative
Ann Jones MS		11 May 2016	12 May 2021	Labour
David Rees MS		12 May 2021	12 May 2026	Labour
Kerry Ferguson MS		12 May 2026	Incumbent	Plaid Cymru

== List of Llywydd elections ==
Llywydd elections
Senedd term	Date	Candidates	Votes received
1st Assembly	12 May 1999	Dafydd Elis-Thomas	Unopposed
2nd Assembly	7 May 2003	Dafydd Elis-Thomas	Unopposed
3rd Assembly	9 May 2007	Dafydd Elis-Thomas	Unopposed
4th Assembly	11 May 2011	Rosemary Butler	Unopposed
5th Assembly	11 May 2016	Elin Jones	34
5th Assembly	11 May 2016	Dafydd Elis-Thomas	25
6th Senedd	12 May 2021	Elin Jones	35
6th Senedd	12 May 2021	Russell George	25
7th Senedd	12 May 2026	Huw Irranca-Davies	85
7th Senedd	12 May 2026	Paul Davies	(did not receive a seconder)

== List of Deputy Presiding Officer elections ==
Deputy Presiding Officer elections			Votes received
Senedd term	Date	Candidates	Votes received
1st Assembly	12 May 1999	Jane Davidson	Unopposed
1st Assembly	19 October 2000	John Marek	28
1st Assembly	19 October 2000	Rosemary Butler	27
2nd Assembly	7 May 2003	John Marek	30
2nd Assembly	7 May 2003	Peter Law	29
3rd Assembly	9 May 2007	Rosemary Butler	Unopposed
4th Assembly	11 May 2011	David Melding	46
4th Assembly	11 May 2011	William Graham	12
5th Assembly	11 May 2016	Ann Jones	30
5th Assembly	11 May 2016	John Griffiths	29
6th Senedd	12 May 2021	David Rees	35
6th Senedd	12 May 2021	Hefin David	24
7th Senedd	12 May 2026	Kerry Ferguson	Unopposed

== See also ==
- Presiding Officer of the Scottish Parliament
- Speaker of the Northern Ireland Assembly
- Speaker of the House of Commons (United Kingdom)
- Lord Speaker
