= Torfaen (disambiguation) =

Torfaen is a county borough, in Wales.

Torfaen may also refer to:

- Torfaen (Senedd constituency)
- Torfaen (UK Parliament constituency)
