= Rosemary Butler =

Rosemary Butler may refer to:

- Rosemary Butler (politician) (born 1943), British politician
- Rosemary Butler (singer) (born 1947), American singer
