= Merthyr Tydfil and Rhymney =

Merthyr Tydfil and Rhymney may refer to:

- Merthyr Tydfil and Rhymney (UK Parliament constituency)
- Merthyr Tydfil and Rhymney (Senedd constituency)
