= Kerry Ferguson =

Welsh politician

Kerry Ferguson MS
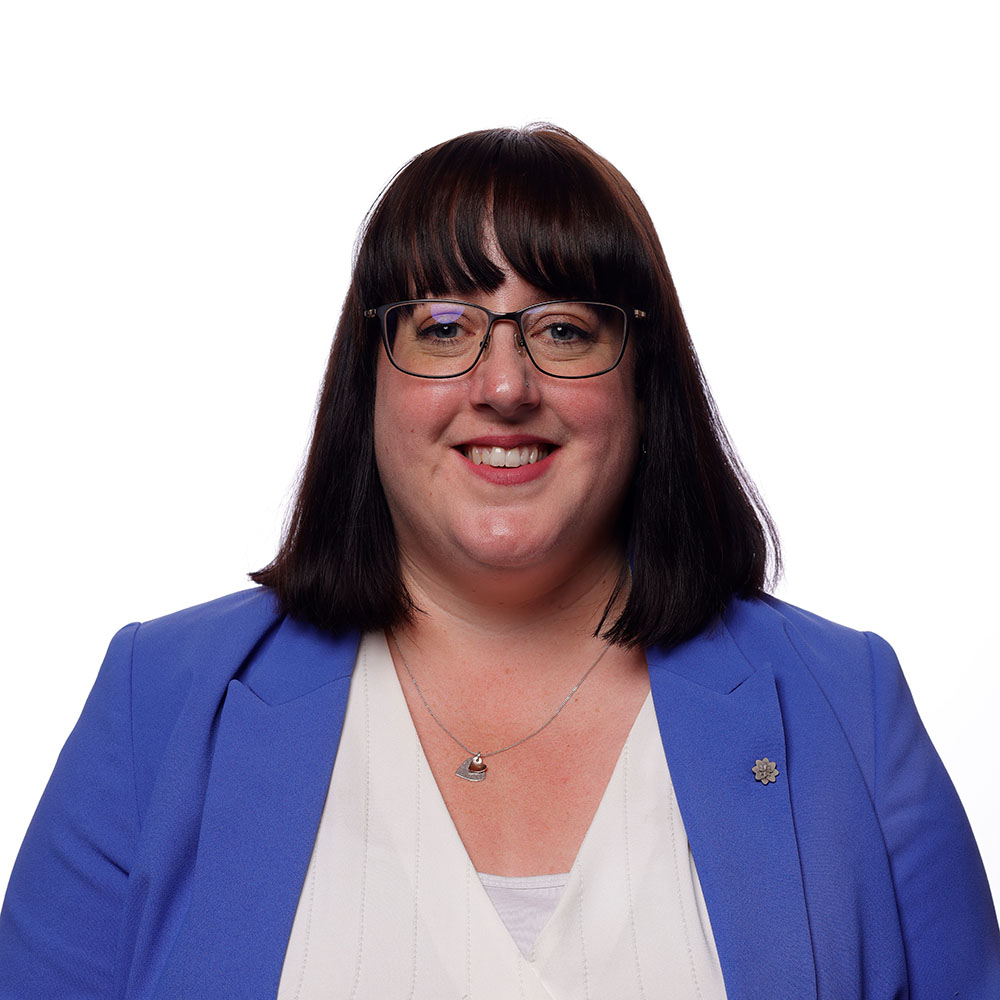

Dirprwy Lywydd of the Senedd
- Incumbent
- Assumed office 12 May 2026
- Llywydd: Huw Irranca-Davies
- Preceded by: David Rees

Member of the Senedd
- Incumbent
- Assumed office 8 May 2026
- Constituency: Ceredigion Penfro

Personal details
- Party: Plaid Cymru

Kerry Elizabeth Ferguson is a Welsh politician from Plaid Cymru who has served as a Member of the Senedd (MS) for Ceredigion Penfro and as Dirprwy Lywydd of the Senedd since 2026.

== Biography ==
Ferguson was Mayor of Aberystwyth. she lives in Aberystwyth. In the 2022 Ceredigion County Council election, she was a candidate in Ystwyth ward. In the 2026 Senedd election, Ferguson stood as the second candidate in Ceredigion Penfro behind Elin Jones. She was elected as a Senedd Member in 2026.
