= Steffan Lewis =

Welsh politician (1984–2019)

Steffan Lewis AM
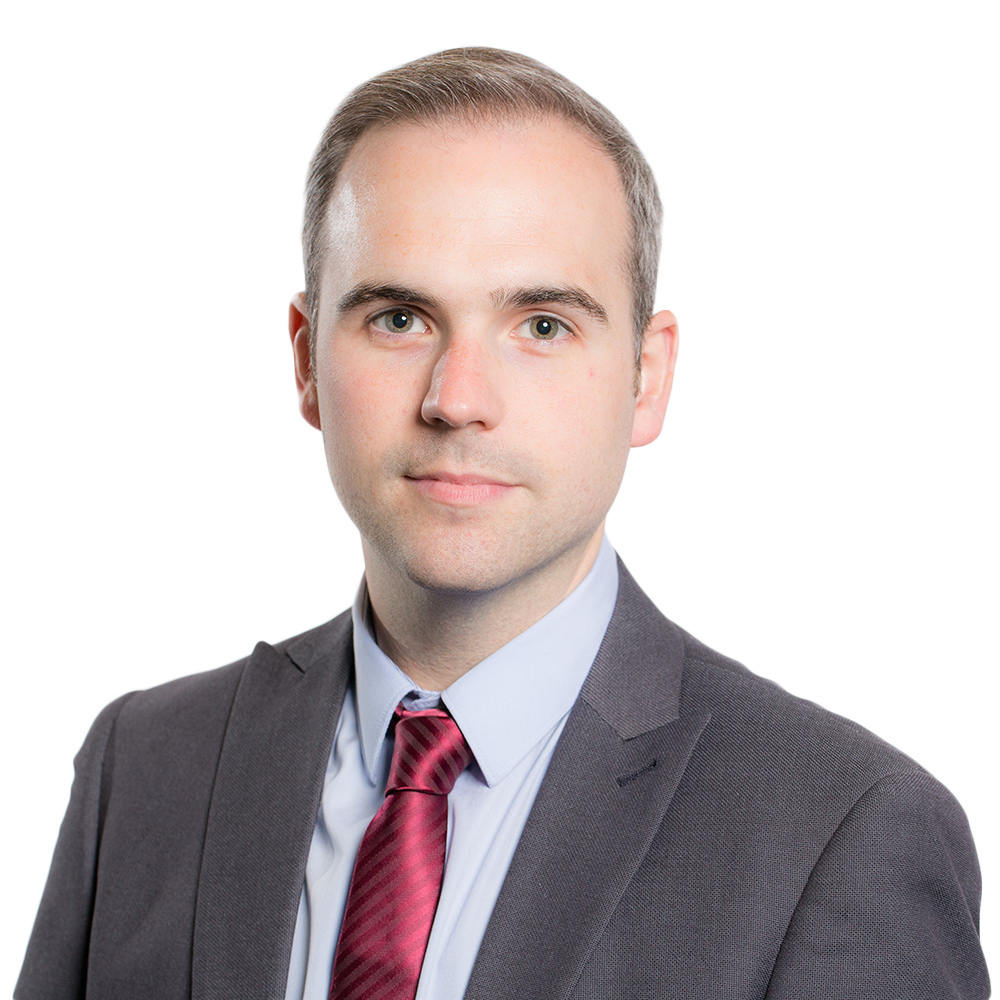
- Steffan Lewis in 2016

Member of the Welsh Assembly for South Wales East
- In office 6 May 2016 – 11 January 2019
- Preceded by: Jocelyn Davies
- Succeeded by: Delyth Jewell

Personal details
- Born: 30 May 1984 Ystrad Mynach, Caerphilly, Wales
- Died: 11 January 2019 (aged 34) Ystrad Mynach, Caerphilly, Wales
- Party: Plaid Cymru
- Spouse: Shona
- Children: 1

Steffan Lewis (30 May 1984 – 11 January 2019) was a Welsh politician, who was elected to the National Assembly for Wales in the 2016 election. He represented the electoral region of South Wales East, as a member of Plaid Cymru.

In December 2017, Lewis was diagnosed with terminal bowel cancer. He died on 11 January 2019, aged 34.

== Early life ==
Steffan Lewis was brought up in a bilingual household in Crosskeys and Tredegar. He first attended Swffryd Primary School in Blaenau Gwent before moving to the Welsh-medium primary school Ysgol Gymraeg Cwm Gwyddon in Abercarn and later Ysgol Gyfun Gwynllyw in Pontypool.

He first became interested in politics with the 1995 Islwyn by-election, and became an active Plaid Cymru campaigner at the 1999 Welsh assembly election. He then worked at a call centre before briefly studying Religious Studies and Ethics at Cardiff University.

== Political career ==
Lewis was a town councillor in Blackwood and was the Plaid candidate for the 2006 Blaenau Gwent by-election to the House of Commons, coming third with 6.5% of the vote. He then worked with the party in the National Assembly for Wales, and wrote speeches for Leanne Wood during her leadership of the party. He stood for election in Blaenau Gwent again in 2015 and came fourth of six candidates with 9% of the vote.

In 2015, he was chosen as the top candidate for Plaid Cymru in the South East Wales region and was elected to the National Assembly for Wales in the 2016 election as its youngest-ever member. He succeeded Jocelyn Davies, for whom he had previously worked as a communications officer. He was made the party's Secretary for External Affairs and led the response to Brexit.

== Illness and death ==
Just one year after having taken his seat in the National Assembly, Lewis was diagnosed with bowel cancer in December 2017. It was found that the disease had already spread to other parts of his body, and he was not expected to recover. He spoke openly about fighting the illness and how he was coping.

He died at Ystrad Fawr Hospital in Ystrad Mynach on 11 January 2019. Tributes were paid to him from all parties in the Assembly.

Adam Price, leader of Plaid Cymru said:

"Steffan was beloved by his friends in Plaid Cymru and we are in a state of shock and grief at losing our very brightest star..."

He was succeeded by Delyth Jewell, who had been second on Plaid's list in the region at the 2016 election.

His funeral was scheduled for 25 January at St Luke's Church, Abercarn, followed by burial at the local cemetery.

== Personal life ==
Lewis married Shona, who is from Inverness, in 2009. They lived in Blackwood and had a son, Celyn, aged three years at the time of his father's death. He was a noted fan of Celtic Football Club.

== Offices held ==
Senedd
Preceded by Jocelyn Davies	Assembly Member for South Wales East; 2016 – 2019	Succeeded by Delyth Jewell
Political offices
Preceded by Bethan Jenkins	Baby of the House; 2016-2018	Succeeded by Jack Sargeant
Political offices
Preceded by N/A	Shadow Minister for External Affairs, Non-Devolved Matters, Police, the Criminal Justice System and Social Protection; 2016 – 2019	Succeeded by Delyth Jewell
