= Newport West (Senedd constituency) =

Senedd constituency (1999–2026)

Coordinates: 51.589°N 3.062°W

Newport West Gorllewin Casnewydd
- Former Senedd county constituency for the Senedd
- Newport West shown as one of the 40; Senedd constituencies

Former Senedd county constituency
- Created: 1999
- Abolished: 2026
- Party: Labour
- MS: Jayne Bryant
- Electoral region: South Wales East

Newport West (Welsh: Gorllewin Casnewydd) was a constituency of the Senedd. It elected one Member of the Senedd by the first past the post method of election. Also, however, it was one of eight constituencies in the South Wales East electoral region, which elected four additional members, in addition to eight constituency members, to produce a degree of proportional representation for the region as a whole. It was last represented by Jayne Bryant for Labour.

== Boundaries ==
Map of 1999–2026 boundaries

The constituency was created for the first election to the Assembly, in 1999, with the same boundaries of the Newport West (UK Parliament constituency).

The other seven constituencies of the South Wales East electoral region were Blaenau Gwent, Caerphilly, Islwyn, Merthyr Tydfil and Rhymney, Monmouth, Newport East and Torfaen.

== Voting ==
In general elections for the Senedd, each voter had two votes. The first vote was used to vote for a candidate to become the Member of the Senedd for the voter's constituency, elected by the first past the post system. The second vote was used to vote for a regional closed party list of candidates. Additional member seats were allocated from the lists by the d'Hondt method, with constituency results being taken into account in the allocation.

== Assembly Members and Members of the Senedd ==
Election	Member	Party
1999	Rosemary Butler	Labour
2016	Jayne Bryant	Labour

== Results ==
=== Elections in the 2020s ===
2021 Senedd election: Newport West
Party	Candidate	Constituency			Regional		
Party	Candidate	Votes	%	±%	Votes	%	±%
Labour	Jayne Bryant (Note: Incumbent member for this constituency)	14,259	48.2	+4.4	11,965	40.4	-1.1
Conservative	Michael Enea	10,353	35.0	+6.0	9,732	32.8	+6.7
Plaid Cymru	Jonathan Clark	2,076	7.0	+1.1	2,699	9.1	+3.1
Green	Amelia Womack	1,314	4.4	+1.5	1,763	6.0	+3.2
Liberal Democrats	John Miller	882	3.0	-0.2	919	3.1	-0.5
Reform UK	Kevin Anthony Boucher	486	1.6	New	301	1.0	New
Freedom Alliance (UK)	Steve Marsh	228	0.8	New	159	0.5	New
Abolish					1,292	4.4	+0.3
UKIP					416	1.4	-13.4
Gwlad					144	0.5	New
Propel					116	0.4	New
Communist					82	0.3	+0.1
TUSC					40	0.1	-0.2
Majority		3,906	13.2	−1.6			
Turnout		29,112					
Labour hold		Swing					
Notes

Regional Ballot void votes: 242. Want of an Official Mark (0), Voting for more than ONE party or individual candidate (93), Writing or mark by which the Voter could be identified (0), Unmarked or Void for uncertainty (149)

=== Elections in the 2010s ===
Welsh Assembly Election 2016: Newport West
Party	Candidate	Constituency			Regional		
Party	Candidate	Votes	%	±%	Votes	%	±%
Labour	Jayne Bryant	12,157	43.8	-8.4	11,493	41.5	-0.5
Conservative	Matthew Evans	8,042	29.0	-4.9	7,228	26.1	-3.0
UKIP	Mike Ford	3,842	13.8	New	4,092	14.8	+8.9
Plaid Cymru	Simon Coopey	1,645	5.9	-1.2	1,669	6.0	-0.7
Liberal Democrats	Elizabeth Newton	880	3.2	-3.7	985	3.6	-2.0
Green	Pippa Bartolotti	814	2.9	New	788	2.8	-0.2
Independent	Bill Fearnley-Whittingstall	333	1.2	New			
Cymru Sovereign	Gruff Meredith	38	0.1	New			
Abolish					1,123	4.1	New
Monster Raving Loony					137	0.5	New
TUSC					74	0.3	New
Communist					66	0.2	-0.1
National Front					40	0.1	New
Majority		4,115	14.8	−3.5			
Turnout		27,751	44.7	+7.9			
Labour hold		Swing					

Welsh Assembly Election 2011: Newport West
Party	Candidate	Constituency			Regional		
Party	Candidate	Votes	%	±%	Votes	%	±%
Labour	Rosemary Butler	12,011	52.2	+11.7	9,759	42.0	+9.0
Conservative	David Williams	7,791	33.9	-0.7	6,751	29.1	-1.6
Plaid Cymru	Lyndon Binding	1,626	7.1	-3.3	1,546	6.7	-1.6
Liberal Democrats	Elizabeth Newton	1,586	6.9	-5.0	1,303	5.6	-5.1
UKIP					1,367	5.9	+2.4
BNP					723	3.1	-2.3
Green					695	3.0	+0.1
Socialist Labour					414	1.8	-0.2
Welsh Christian					348	1.5	+0.5
English Democrat					256	1.1	New
Communist					62	0.3	0.0
Majority		4,220	18.3	+12.4			
Turnout		23,014	36.8	−3.3			
Labour hold		Swing	+6.2				

Regional ballots rejected at the count: 202

=== Elections in the 2000s ===
Welsh Assembly Election 2007: Newport West
Party	Candidate	Constituency			Regional		
Party	Candidate	Votes	%	±%	Votes	%	±%
Labour	Rosemary Butler	9,582	40.5	-6.4	7,825	33.0	-5.1
Conservative	Matthew R.H. Evans	8,181	34.6	+5.2	7,286	30.7	+1.1
Liberal Democrats	Nigel R. Flanagan	2,813	11.9	+2.1	2,526	10.7	-0.4
Plaid Cymru	Brian Hancock	2,449	10.4	+2.6	1,923	8.1	-0.3
English Democrat	Andrew Constantine	634	2.7	New	353	1.5	New
BNP					1,269	5.4	+2.6
UKIP					835	3.5	-1.2
Green					698	2.9	-0.4
Socialist Labour					480	2.0	+0.6
Welsh Christian Party					246	1.0	New
Independent - Colin Hobbs					159	0.7	New
Communist					61	0.3	New
CPA					56	0.2	New
Majority		1,401	5.9	−11.6			
Turnout		23,659	40.1	+5.5			
Labour hold		Swing	-5.8				

Welsh Assembly Election 2003: Newport West
Party	Candidate	Constituency			Regional		
Party	Candidate	Votes	%	±%	Votes	%	±%
Labour	Rosemary Butler	10,053	46.9	-0.7	8,149	38.1	-3.0
Conservative	William Graham	6,301	29.4	+1.2	6,332	29.6	+3.7
Liberal Democrats	Phylip A.D. Hobson	2,094	9.8	-1.8	2,381	11.1	-0.8
Plaid Cymru	Anthony M. Salkeld	1,678	7.8	-4.8	1,809	8.4	-3.3
UKIP	Hugh Hughes	1,102	5.1	New	1,007	4.7	New
Socialist Alliance	Richard Morse	198	0.9	New			
Green					715	3.3	Unknown
BNP					603	2.8	New
Socialist Labour					304	1.4	Unknown
Cymru Annibynnol					69	0.3	New
ProLife Alliance					47	0.2	New
Majority		3,752	17.5	−1.9			
Turnout		21,426	34.6	−7.7			
Labour hold		Swing	-1.0				

2003 Electorate: 61,238
Regional ballots rejected: 453

=== Elections in the 1990s ===
Welsh Assembly Election 1999: Newport West
Party	Candidate	Constituency			Regional		
Party	Candidate	Votes	%	±%	Votes	%	±%
Labour	Rosemary Butler	11,538	47.6	N/A	9,721	40.1	N/A
Conservative	William Graham	6,828	28.2	N/A	6,872	28.4	N/A
Plaid Cymru	Bob Vickery	3,053	12.6	N/A	3,331	13.7	N/A
Liberal Democrats	Veronica Watkins	2,820	11.6	N/A	3,068	12.7	N/A
United Socialist					Unknown	Unknown	N/A
Others					1,234	5.1	N/A
Majority		4,710	19.4	N/A			
Turnout		24,239	42.3	N/A			
Labour win (new seat)							

== See also ==
- Newport East (Senedd constituency)
