= Newport East (Senedd constituency) =

Senedd constituency (1999–2026)

Coordinates: 51.593°N 2.920°W

Newport East Dwyrain Casnewydd
- Former Senedd county constituency for the Senedd
- Newport East shown as one of the 40; Senedd constituencies

Former Senedd county constituency
- Created: 1999
- Abolished: 2026
- Party: Welsh Labour
- MS: John Griffiths
- Electoral region: South Wales East

Newport East (Welsh: Dwyrain Casnewydd) was a constituency of the Senedd. It elected one Member of the Senedd by the first past the post method of election. Also, however, it was one of eight constituencies in the South Wales East electoral region, which elected four additional members, in addition to eight constituency members, to produce a degree of proportional representation for the region as a whole.

== Boundaries ==
Map of 1999–2026 boundaries

The constituency was created for the first election to the Assembly, in 1999, with the same boundaries as the Newport East (UK Parliament constituency).

The other seven constituencies of the South Wales East electoral region were Blaenau Gwent, Caerphilly, Islwyn, Merthyr Tydfil and Rhymney, Monmouth, Newport West and Torfaen.

== Voting ==
In general elections for the Senedd, each voter had two votes. The first vote was used to vote for a candidate to become the Member of the Senedd for the voter's constituency, elected by the first past the post system. The second vote was used to vote for a regional closed party list of candidates. Additional member seats were allocated from the lists by the d'Hondt method, with constituency results being taken into account in the allocation.

== Members of the Senedd ==
Election	Member	Party	Portrait
1999	John Griffiths	Labour	

== Elections ==
=== Elections in the 2020s ===
2021 Senedd election: Newport East
Party	Candidate	Constituency			Regional		
Party	Candidate	Votes	%	±%	Votes	%	±%
Labour	John Griffiths (Note: Incumbent member for this constituency)	10,899	47.4	+2.8	9,687	41.7	+1.1
Conservative	Gareth Hughes	7,315	31.8	+13.6	7,071	30.4	+11.4
Plaid Cymru	Daniel Llewelyn	1,844	8.0	+1.3	2,042	8.8	+1.1
Liberal Democrats	Mike Hamilton	1,574	6.6	-0.6	1,257	5.4	-0.5
Abolish	Robert Steed	660	2.9	New	899	3.9	+0.1
UKIP	Benjamin Walker	368	1.6	-19.3	441	1.9	-17.8
Reform UK	David Rowlands (Note: Incumbent member on the party list, or for another constituency)	328	1.4	New	298	1.3	New
Green					1,059	4.6	+2.4
No More Lockdowns					168	0.7	New
Gwlad					134	0.6	New
Propel					92	0.4	New
Communist					45	0.2	±0.0
TUSC					37	0.2	-0.1
Majority		3,584	15.6	−8.1			
Turnout		22,988					
Labour hold		Swing					
Notes

Regional Ballot void votes: 175. Want of an Official Mark (0), Voting for more than ONE party or individual candidate (70), Writing or mark by which the Voter could be identified (0), Unmarked or Void for uncertainty (105)

=== Elections in the 2010s ===
Welsh Assembly Election 2016: Newport East
Party	Candidate	Constituency			Regional		
Party	Candidate	Votes	%	±%	Votes	%	±%
Labour	John Griffiths	9,229	44.6	-6.2	8,392	40.6	-3.8
UKIP	James Peterson	4,333	20.9	New	4,081	19.7	+13.8
Conservative	Munawar Mughal	3,768	18.2	-4.9	3,919	19.0	-2.6
Liberal Democrats	Paul Halliday	1,481	7.2	-11.8	1,213	5.9	-6.3
Plaid Cymru	Anthony Salkeld	1,386	6.7	-0.3	1,589	7.7	+1.5
Green	Peter Varley	491	2.4	New	451	2.2	+0.3
Abolish					783	3.8	New
Monster Raving Loony					109	0.5	New
TUSC					53	0.3	New
Communist					45	0.2	0.0
National Front					44	0.2	New
Majority		4,896	23.7	−4.0			
Turnout		20,688	37.2	+1.7			
Labour hold		Swing	-13.6				

Welsh Assembly Election 2011: Newport East
Party	Candidate	Constituency			Regional		
Party	Candidate	Votes	%	±%	Votes	%	±%
Labour Co-op	John Griffiths	9,888	50.8	+18.7	8,691	44.4	+13.7
Conservative	Nick Webb	4,500	23.1	+0.4	4,226	21.6	-0.1
Liberal Democrats	Ed Townsend	3,703	19.0	-8.7	2,398	12.2	-10.6
Plaid Cymru	Chris Paul	1,369	7.0	-1.5	1,209	6.2	-2.4
UKIP					1,155	5.9	+2.4
BNP					604	3.1	-0.3
Socialist Labour					398	2.0	+0.6
Green					367	1.9	-0.3
English Democrat					291	1.5	New
Welsh Christian					209	1.1	+0.2
Communist					48	0.2	-2.1
Majority		5,388	27.7	+23.3			
Turnout		19,460	35.5	−2.0			
Labour Co-op hold		Swing					

Regional ballots rejected at the count: 157

=== Elections in the 2000s ===
Welsh Assembly Election 2007: Newport East
Party	Candidate	Constituency			Regional		
Party	Candidate	Votes	%	±%	Votes	%	±%
Labour Co-op	John Griffiths	6,395	32.1	-12.6	6,085	30.7	-9.4
Liberal Democrats	Ed Townsend	5,520	27.7	+11.5	4,527	22.8	+7.5
Conservative	Peter Fox	4,512	22.7	-1.6	4,299	21.7	-0.7
Plaid Cymru	Trefor Puw	1,696	8.5	-0.6	1,707	8.6	+0.1
Independent	James Harris	1,354	6.8	New			
English Democrat	Michael Blundell	429	2.2	New	258	1.3	New
UKIP					696	3.5	-0.5
BNP					676	3.4	+0.2
Communist					455	2.3	New
Green					435	2.2	-1.1
Socialist Labour					278	1.4	-0.9
Independent - Colin Hobbs					178	0.9	New
Welsh Christian Party					173	0.9	New
CPA					59	0.3	New
Majority		875	4.4	−16.0			
Turnout		19,906	37.5	+7.1			
Labour Co-op hold		Swing					

Welsh Assembly Election 2003: Newport East
Party	Candidate	Constituency			Regional		
Party	Candidate	Votes	%	±%	Votes	%	±%
Labour Co-op	John Griffiths	7,621	44.7	-4.7	6,969	40.1	-3.4
Conservative	Matthew Evans	4,157	24.3	+1.5	3,894	22.4	+0.1
Liberal Democrats	Ed Townsend	2,768	16.2	+2.2	2,650	15.3	+0.6
Plaid Cymru	Mohammad Asghar	1,555	9.1	-4.7	1,470	8.5	-5.9
UKIP	Neal J. Reynolds	987	5.8	New	686	4.0	New
Green					567	3.3	Unknown
BNP					563	3.2	New
Socialist Labour					404	2.3	Unknown
Cymru Annibynnol					80	0.5	New
ProLife Alliance					76	0.4	New
Majority		3,484	20.4	−6.2			
Turnout		17,212	30.4	−5.0			
Labour Co-op hold		Swing	-3.2				

2003 Electorate: 56,563
Regional ballots rejected: 239

=== Elections in the 1990s ===
Welsh Assembly Election 1999: Newport East
Party	Candidate	Constituency			Regional		
Party	Candidate	Votes	%	±%	Votes	%	±%
Labour Co-op	John Griffiths	9,497	49.4	N/A	8,319	43.5	N/A
Conservative	Mark A. Major	4,368	22.8	N/A	4,278	22.3	N/A
Liberal Democrats	Alistair Cameron	2,684	14.0	N/A	2,815	14.7	N/A
Plaid Cymru	Christopher K. Holland	2,647	13.8	N/A	2,750	14.4	N/A
United Socialist					Unknown	Unknown	N/A
Others					983	5.1	N/A
Majority		5,129	26.6	N/A			
Turnout		19,214	35.4	N/A			
Labour Co-op win (new seat)							

== See also ==
- Newport West (Senedd constituency)
