= Lynne Neagle =

Welsh politician (born 1968)

Lynne Neagle MS
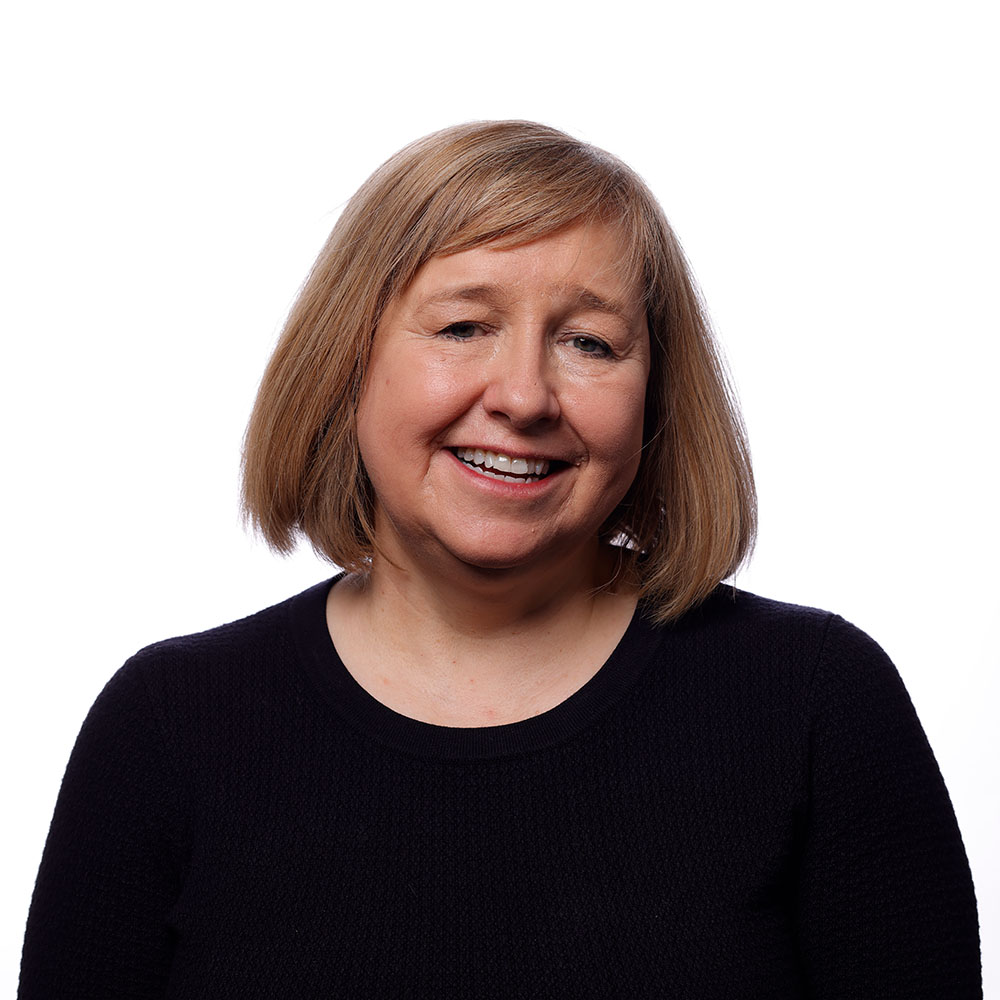
- Official portrait, 2026

Member of the Senedd for Sir Fynwy Torfaen Torfaen (1999–2026)
- Incumbent
- Assumed office 6 May 1999
- Preceded by: Office created

Cabinet Secretary for Education
- In office 21 March 2024 – 12 May 2026
- First Minister: Vaughan Gething; Eluned Morgan
- Preceded by: Jeremy Miles
- Succeeded by: Anna Brychan

Deputy Minister for Mental Health and Wellbeing
- In office 13 May 2021 – 21 March 2024
- First Minister: Mark Drakeford
- Preceded by: The Baroness Morgan of Ely
- Succeeded by: Jayne Bryant

Personal details
- Born: 18 January 1968 (age 58) Merthyr Tydfil, Wales
- Party: Welsh Labour Co-operative
- Spouse: Huw Lewis
- Children: 2
- Education: University of Reading
- Occupation: Political adviser
- Website: Welsh Labour

Lynne Neagle (born 18 January 1968) is a Welsh Labour & Co-operative politician who has served as a Member of the Senedd (MS) since its creation in 1999. She is currently a Member of the Senedd (MS) for Sir Fynwy Torfaen, and previously represented the constituency of Torfaen from 1999 until its abolition in 2026. Neagle served in the Gething government and Morgan governments as Cabinet Secretary for Education.

== Background ==
Neagle was born in Merthyr Tydfil, Glamorgan, Wales. She was educated at Cyfarthfa High School, Merthyr Tydfil, and the University of Reading, where she read French and Italian.

She is a former Voluntary Sector Carer and Careers Development Officer. Neagle was also a research assistant to Glenys Kinnock MEP from 1994 to 1997.

== Political career ==
=== First and Second Senedd (1999–2007) ===
Neagle was elected to the Senedd in 1999 as a Labour candidate to represent Torfaen. Neagle was an ally of Alun Michael during his leadership of the Welsh Labour party.

Later in the first term, she was appointed to the role of Chair of the Welsh Labour group in the Senedd. She initially opposed coalition with the Welsh Liberal Democrats, and supported a motion that would have required any coalition from the 2003 Assembly election onward to go to a vote of Welsh Labour members. However, she later said that the "alternative was worse" and supported the formation of a coalition.

She was occasionally critical of policy of the Morgan government, including the party's health policy, around a lack of targets and around funding, and the elimination of school league tables.

She was re-elected in 2003 with a majority of 6,964 votes. She was a member of the Standards committee during the Second Assembly.

=== Third Senedd (2007–2011) ===
Neagle was critical of the creation of the 2007 coalition with Plaid Cymru, known as "One Wales". In emails leaked to the Western Mail at the time, she stated she wanted "no stone left unturned" in terms of avoiding a Labour-Plaid coalition, by re-engaging the Welsh Liberal Democrats in talks. She wrote to criticise the coalition in the Western Mail, saying "The facts as I see them in the One Wales document points to a fundamental and detrimental change in direction for Welsh politics. They are not facts I can ignore."

Neagle was appointed a member of the Finance committee in the Third Assembly. She was also appointed as one of four Labour AMs to sit on the steering group of the 2007 All Wales Convention, on Wales' constitutional future, chaired by Sir Emyr Jones Parry.

In 2009 Neagle proposed to make the MMR vaccine compulsory, amid an outbreak of Measles in Wales.

She supported her husband, Huw Lewis's effort to become leader of the Welsh Labour Party in the 2009 leadership contest. He was not successful, with Carwyn Jones being selected to lead the party.

Ahead of the 2011 elections she was adopted as a Labour & Co-operative candidate.

=== Fourth and Fifth Senedd (2011–2021) ===
Neagle was re-elected at the 2011 Assembly elections, with a majority of 6,088 votes. She was appointed to the children and young people and health and social care committees for the fourth assembly.

At the 2016 Senedd election she was again re-elected, with a majority of 4,498 votes. She was appointed to chair the children, young people and education committee.

Neagle was one of a number of AMs to back a statement calling for the UK to remain within the European Economic Area.

She supported Vaughan Gething in the 2018 Welsh Labour leadership election.

=== Sixth and Seventh Senedd (2021–present) ===
Neagle was re-elected at the 2021 Senedd election, with a majority of 5,321 votes. Neagle was appointed as Deputy Minister for Mental Health and Wellbeing by First Minister Mark Drakeford shortly after.

Neagle supported Vaughan Gething in the February–March 2024 Welsh Labour leadership election. After Gething won the leadership election, Neagle was appointed as Cabinet Secretary for Education in the Gething government.

Neagle was elected as MS for the Sir Fynwy Torfaen Senedd constituency at the 2026 Senedd election. Her old constituency of Torfaen was abolished at the 2026 election amid wider reform of the Senedd.

== Personal life ==
Neagle is married to Huw Lewis, the former Senedd Member for Merthyr Tydfil and Rhymney. They currently live in Penarth with their two children, James and Sam.

== Offices held ==
Senedd
| Preceded by (new post) | Member of the Senedd for Torfaen; 1999–2026 | Succeeded by Seat abolished |
| Preceded by (new seat) | Member of the Senedd for Sir Fynwy Torfaen; 2026–present | Incumbent |
