= Monmouth (Senedd constituency) =

Senedd constituency (1999–2026)

Coordinates: 51.814°N 2.713°W

Monmouth Mynwy
- Former Senedd constituency for the Senedd

- Monmouth shown within the South Wales East electoral region and the region shown within Wales

Former Senedd constituency
- Created: 1999
- Abolished: 2026
- Party: Conservative
- MS: Peter Fox
- Preserved county: Monmouthshire

Monmouth (Welsh: Mynwy) was a constituency of the Senedd. It elected one Member of the Senedd by the first past the post method of election. It was also one of eight constituencies in the South Wales East electoral region, which elected four additional members (in addition to the eight constituency members) to produce a degree of proportional representation for the region as a whole.

== Boundaries ==
Map of 1999–2026 boundaries

The constituency was created for the first election to the Assembly, in 1999, with the name and boundaries of the Monmouth UK Parliament constituency.

The other seven constituencies of the South Wales East electoral region were Blaenau Gwent, Caerphilly, Islwyn, Merthyr Tydfil and Rhymney, Newport East, Newport West and Torfaen.

== Voting ==
In general elections for the Senedd, each voter had two votes. The first vote was used to vote for a candidate to become the Member of the Senedd for the voter's constituency, elected by the first past the post system. The second vote was used to vote for a regional closed party list of candidates. Additional member seats were allocated from the lists by the d'Hondt method, with constituency results being taken into account in the allocation.

== Assembly Members and Members of the Senedd ==
Election	Member	Party
1999	David Davies	Conservative
2007	Nick Ramsay	Conservative
March 2021	Nick Ramsay	Independent
2021	Peter Fox	Conservative

== Results ==
=== Elections in the 2020s ===
2021 Senedd election: Monmouth
Party	Candidate	Constituency			Regional		
Party	Candidate	Votes	%	±%	Votes	%	±%
Conservative	Peter Fox	15,332	42.7	-0.6	13,643	38.2	+1.0
Labour	Catrin Maby	11,487	32.0	+5.1	10,562	29.6	+4.0
Plaid Cymru	Hugh Kocan	2,085	5.8	±0.0	3,003	8.4	-0.1
Green	Ian Chandler	2,000	5.6	+2.7	2,938	8.2	+4.3
Liberal Democrats	Jo Watkins	1,892	5.3	+0.6	2,043	5.7	-0.3
Independent	Nick Ramsay (Note: Incumbent member for this constituency)	1,293	3.6	N/A			
Abolish	Mark Reckless (Note: Incumbent member on the party list, or for another constituency)	1,174	3.3	New	2,065	5.8	-0.1
Reform UK	Susan Boucher	349	1.0	New	334	0.9	New
Freedom Alliance (UK)	Elspeth Hill	181	0.5	New	186	0.5	New
Gwlad	Laurence Williams	90	0.3	New	169	0.5	New
UKIP					549	1.5	-10.3
Propel					103	0.3	New
Communist					76	0.2	±0.0
TUSC					25	0.1	-0.1
Majority		3,845	10.7	−5.7			
Turnout		35,883					
Conservative hold		Swing					
Notes

Regional Ballot void votes: 265. Want of an Official Mark (0), Voting for more than ONE party or individual candidate (49), Writing or mark by which the Voter could be identified (0), Unmarked or Void for uncertainty (216)

=== Elections in the 2010s ===
Welsh Assembly Election 2016: Monmouth
Party	Candidate	Constituency			Regional		
Party	Candidate	Votes	%	±%	Votes	%	±%
Conservative	Nick Ramsay	13,585	43.3	−7.0	11,604	37.2	-5.1
Labour	Catherine Fookes	8,438	26.9	−3.0	7,998	25.6	-1.6
UKIP	Tim Price	3,092	9.8	New	3,668	11.8	+6.8
Independent	Debby Blakebrough	1,932	6.2	New			
Plaid Cymru	Jonathan Clark	1,824	5.8	−1.7	2,646	8.5	+2.2
Liberal Democrats	Veronica German	1,474	4.7	−5.1	1,872	6.0	-1.8
Green	Chris Were	910	2.9	New	1,202	3.9	-0.4
English Democrat	Stephen Morris	146	0.5	−2.0			
Abolish					1,853	5.9	New
Monster Raving Loony					172	0.6	New
TUSC					76	0.2	New
Communist					67	0.2	0.0
National Front					44	0.1	New
Majority		5,147	16.4	−4.0			
Turnout		31,401	48.9	+2.8			
Conservative hold		Swing					

Welsh Assembly Election 2011: Monmouth
Party	Candidate	Constituency			Regional		
Party	Candidate	Votes	%	±%	Votes	%	±%
Conservative	Nick Ramsay	15,087	50.3	−1.7	12,717	42.3	-3.9
Labour	Mark Whitcutt	8,970	29.9	+6.5	8,173	27.2	+6.6
Liberal Democrats	Janet Ellard	2,937	9.8	−4.9	2,361	7.8	-3.5
Plaid Cymru	Fiona Cross	2,263	7.5	+0.4	1,891	6.3	+0.4
English Democrat	Steve Uncles	744	2.5	−0.2	935	3.1	+1.0
UKIP					1,560	5.2	+1.5
Green					1,293	4.3	+0.1
BNP					499	1.7	-1.3
Socialist Labour					331	1.1	-0.3
Welsh Christian					252	0.8	+0.1
Communist					75	0.2	+0.2
Majority		6,117	20.4	−8.2			
Turnout		30,001	46.1	−0.8			
Conservative hold		Swing	−4.2				

Regional ballots rejected at the count: 226

=== Elections in the 2000s ===
Welsh Assembly Election 2007: Monmouth
Party	Candidate	Constituency			Regional		
Party	Candidate	Votes	%	±%	Votes	%	±%
Conservative	Nick Ramsay	15,389	52.0	−5.5	13,692	46.2	-0.6
Labour	Richard Clark	6,920	23.4	−3.5	6,104	20.6	-4.3
Liberal Democrats	Jacqui A. Sullivan	4,359	14.7	+4.0	3,357	11.3	+0.5
Plaid Cymru	Jonathan Clark	2,093	7.1	+2.2	1,761	5.9	+0.1
English Democrat	Robert Abrams	804	2.7	New	633	2.1	New
Green					1,236	4.2	-0.2
UKIP					1,099	3.7	+0.2
BNP					874	3.0	+1.2
Socialist Labour					402	1.4	-0.1
Welsh Christian Party					216	0.7	New
Independent – Colin Hobbs					186	0.6	New
CPA					45	0.2	New
Communist					2	0.0	New
Majority		8,469	28.6	−2.0			
Turnout		29,565	46.9	+2.7			
Conservative hold		Swing	−1.0				

Welsh Assembly Election 2003: Monmouth
Party	Candidate	Constituency			Regional		
Party	Candidate	Votes	%	±%	Votes	%	±%
Conservative	David Thomas Charles Davies	15,989	57.5	+16.6	12,969	46.8	+6.4
Labour	Siân James	7,479	26.9	−5.4	6,901	24.9	-5.1
Liberal Democrats	Alison Willott	2,973	10.7	−3.9	2,988	10.8	-3.1
Plaid Cymru	Stephen V. Thomas	1,355	4.9	−1.3	1,599	5.8	-5.4
Green					1,206	4.4	Unknown
UKIP					964	3.5	Unknown
BNP					491	1.8	New
Socialist Labour					408	1.5	Unknown
Cymru Annibynnol					111	0.4	New
ProLife Alliance					82	0.3	New
Majority		8,510	30.6	+22.0			
Turnout		27,796	44.2	−6.9			
Conservative hold		Swing	+11.0				

2003 Electorate: 62,451
Regional ballots rejected: 294

=== Elections in the 1990s ===
Welsh Assembly Election 1999: Monmouth
Party	Candidate	Constituency			Regional		
Party	Candidate	Votes	%	±%	Votes	%	±%
Conservative	David Thomas Charles Davies	12,950	40.9	N/A	12,771	40.4	N/A
Labour	Cherry R.P. Short	10,238	32.3	N/A	9,498	30.0	N/A
Liberal Democrats	Chris P. Lines	4,639	14.6	N/A	4,399	13.9	N/A
Plaid Cymru	Marc Hubbard	1,964	6.2	N/A	3,528	11.2	N/A
Tourism and Farmers Party of Wales	Anthony Carrington	1,911	6.0	N/A			
United Socialist					Unknown	Unknown	N/A
Others					1,431	4.5	N/A
Majority		2,712	8.6	N/A			
Turnout		31,702	51.1	N/A			
Conservative win (new seat)							
