= Jocelyn Davies =

British politician (born 1959)

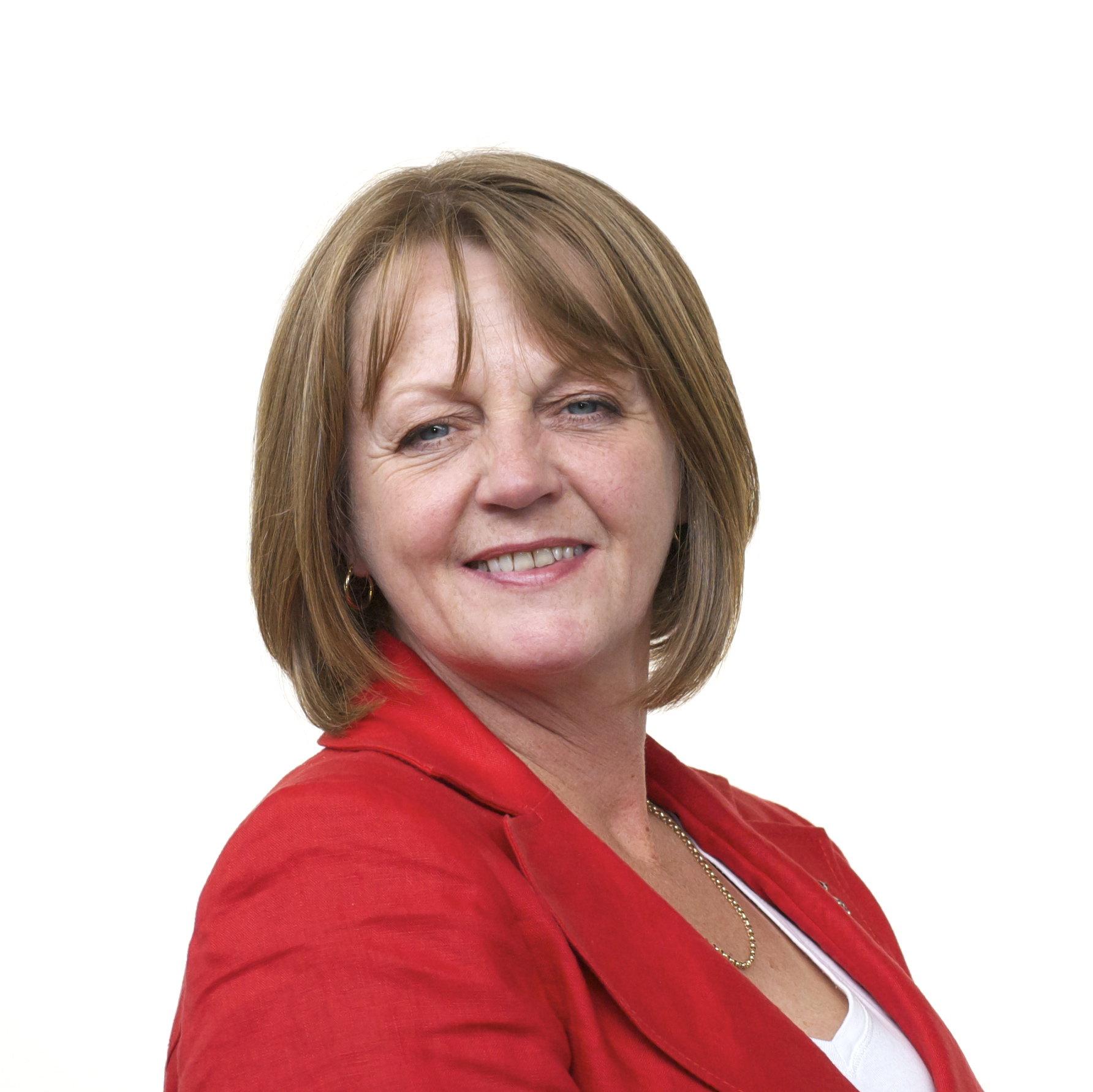

Member of the Welsh Assembly for South Wales East
- In office 6 May 1999 – 4 April 2016
- Preceded by: New Assembly
- Succeeded by: Steffan Lewis

Personal details
- Born: 18 June 1959 (age 67) Usk, Monmouthshire, Wales
- Party: Plaid Cymru
- Spouse: Mike Davies
- Education: Harris Manchester College, Oxford

Jocelyn Davies (born 18 June 1959) is a Plaid Cymru politician who was a member of the Welsh Assembly (AM), for the South Wales East region from 1999 until 2016. She was Deputy Minister for Housing and Regeneration in the Labour/Plaid coalition government from 2007 until 2011.

== Background ==
After attending Newbridge Grammar School, she read law at Harris Manchester College, Oxford. One of the first lay-inspectors of schools in 1993. Davies is married to Newbridge councillor Mike Davies. In 2004, she discovered tissue samples from their daughter, stillborn 16 years previously, were still being held in a Newport hospital.

Davies has three children.

== Political career ==
Davies was a councillor on Islwyn Borough Council between 1987 and 1991, and contested the 1995 Islwyn by-election.

Davies served as a member of the National Assembly for Wales, as a list member for South Wales East, from 1999 to 2026 and has served as Plaid Cymru Party Business Manager from 2000 to 2007.

In the Second Assembly, she was Chair on both the Committee on the Inquiry into the E.coli outbreak in Wales and the South Wales East Regional Committee.

In the Third Assembly, she was appointed Deputy Minister for Housing in the Labour and Plaid Cymru coalition government on 19 July, serving until 2011.

She retired from the Assembly at the 2016 election.

== Post Assembly ==
Davies currently sits on the Audit Risk and Assurance Committee for the Future Generations Commissioner for Wales.

== Offices held ==
Senedd
New constituency	Assembly Member for South Wales East; 1999–2016	Succeeded by Steffan Lewis
Political offices
Preceded by Leighton Andrews	Deputy Minister for Housing; 2007-2011	Post abolished
