= Torfaen (Senedd constituency) =

Senedd constituency (1999–2026)

Coordinates: 51.696°N 3.063°W

- Former Senedd county constituency for the Senedd
- Torfaen shown as one of the 40; Welsh Assembly constituencies

Former Senedd county constituency
- Created: 1999
- Abolished: 2026
- Party: Labour
- MS: Lynne Neagle
- Electoral region: South Wales East

Torfaen was a constituency of the Senedd. It elected one Member of the Senedd by the first past the post method of election. It was also one of eight constituencies in the South Wales East electoral region, which elected four additional members, in addition to eight constituency members, to produce a degree of proportional representation for the region as a whole.

== Boundaries ==
Map of 1999–2026 boundaries

The constituency was created for the first election to the Assembly, in 1999, with the name and boundaries of the Torfaen Westminster constituency.

The other seven constituencies of the South Wales East electoral region were Blaenau Gwent, Caerphilly, Islwyn, Merthyr Tydfil and Rhymney, Monmouth, Newport East and Newport West.

== Voting ==
In general elections for the Senedd, each voter had two votes. The first vote was used to vote for a candidate to become the Assembly Member for the voter's constituency, elected by the first past the post system. The second vote was used to vote for a regional closed party list of candidates. Additional member seats were allocated from the lists by the d'Hondt method, with constituency results being taken into account in the allocation.

== Members of the Senedd ==
Election	Member	Party
1999	Lynne Neagle	Labour

== Elections ==
=== Elections in the 2020s ===
2021 Senedd election: Torfaen
Party	Candidate	Constituency			Regional		
Party	Candidate	Votes	%	±%	Votes	%	±%
Labour	Lynne Neagle	11,572	48.3	+5.9	10,535	43.7	+3.5
Conservative	Gruff Parry	6,251	26.1	+9.0	6,084	25.2	+10.1
Plaid Cymru	Lyn Ackerman	2,564	10.7	-1.7	2,801	11.6	-1.0
Liberal Democrats	Veronica German	1,180	4.9	+2.2	765	3.2	+0.4
UKIP	Thomas Harrison	895	3.7	-18.9	645	2.7	-18.3
Reform	Ian Williams	730	3.0	New	474	2.0	New
Freedom Alliance (UK)	Mathew Ross-Francombe	522	2.2	New	241	1.0	New
Gwlad	Ryan Williams	239	1.0	New	240	1.0	New
Abolish					1,092	4.5	+0.2
Green					966	4.0	+1.7
Propel					144	0.6	New
Communist					68	0.3	±0.0
TUSC					46	0.2	-0.1
Majority		5,321	24.8	+5.0			
Turnout		23,935					
Labour hold		Swing					
Notes

Regional Ballot void votes: 128. Want of an Official Mark (0), Voting for more than ONE party or individual candidate (46), Writing or mark by which the Voter could be identified (0), Unmarked or Void for uncertainty (82)

=== Elections in the 2010s ===
Welsh Assembly Election 2016: Torfaen
Party	Candidate	Constituency			Regional		
Party	Candidate	Votes	%	±%	Votes	%	±%
Labour	Lynne Neagle	9,688	42.4	-3.8	9,264	40.2	-7.7
UKIP	Susan Boucher	5,190	22.6	New	4,842	21.0	+14.3
Conservative	Graham Smith	3,931	17.1	+2.3	3,488	15.1	-1.2
Plaid Cymru	Matthew Woolfall-Jones	2,860	12.4	+0.2	2,914	12.6	+0.9
Green	Steven Jenkins	681	3.0	New	542	2.3	-0.5
Liberal Democrats	Alison Willott	628	2.7	-1.1	656	2.8	-2.3
Abolish					1,000	4.3	New
Monster Raving Loony					168	0.7	New
TUSC					69	0.3	New
National Front					68	0.3	New
Communist					58	0.3	-0.1
Majority		4,498	19.8	−7.5			
Turnout		22,978	38.1	+1.9			
Labour hold		Swing					

Welsh Assembly Election 2011: Torfaen
Party	Candidate	Constituency			Regional		
Party	Candidate	Votes	%	±%	Votes	%	±%
Labour	Lynne Neagle	10,318	46.2	+3.5	10,675	47.9	+7.5
Independent	Elizabeth Haynes	4,230	18.9	New			
Conservative	Natasha Asghar	3,306	14.8	-4.7	3,630	16.3	-1.1
Plaid Cymru	Jeff Rees	2,716	12.2	+0.3	2,615	11.7	+0.6
BNP	Susan Harwood	906	4.1	New	967	4.3	-1.3
Liberal Democrats	Will Griffiths	852	3.8	-7.6	1,147	5.1	-6.0
UKIP					1,491	6.7	+2.3
Green					622	2.8	-0.1
Socialist Labour					577	2.6	-0.1
Welsh Christian					326	1.5	+0.3
English Democrat					156	0.7	New
Communist					83	0.4	±0.0
Majority		6,088	27.3	+4.1			
Turnout		22,328	36.2	−0.9			
Labour hold		Swing					

Regional ballots rejected at the count: 164

=== Elections in the 2000s ===
Welsh Assembly Election 2007: Torfaen
Party	Candidate	Constituency			Regional		
Party	Candidate	Votes	%	±%	Votes	%	±%
Labour	Lynne Neagle	9,921	42.7	-9.2	9,362	40.4	-7.9
Conservative	Graham Smith	4,525	19.5	+3.2	4,031	17.4	+1.6
Blaenau Gwent PV	Ian Williams	3,348	14.4	New	{{{list_votes}}}		
Plaid Cymru	Rhys ab Ellis	2,762	11.9	+1.2	2,579	11.1	+1.2
Liberal Democrats	Patrick Legg	2,659	11.4	-2.6	2,575	11.1	-1.9
BNP					1,293	5.6	+3.9
UKIP					1,020	4.4	-0.4
Green					679	2.9	-0.3
Socialist Labour					617	2.7	+0.4
Independent - Colin Hobbs					463	2.0	New
Welsh Christian Party					276	1.2	New
English Democrat					139	0.6	New
Communist					89	0.4	New
CPA					56	0.2	New
Majority		5,396	23.2	−12.4			
Turnout		23,215	37.1	+5.4			
Labour hold		Swing	−6.2				

Welsh Assembly Election 2003: Torfaen
Party	Candidate	Constituency			Regional		
Party	Candidate	Votes	%	±%	Votes	%	±%
Labour	Lynne Neagle (Note: Incumbent member for this constituency)	10,152	51.9	+13.9	9,353	48.3	-3.0
Conservative	Nick Ramsay	3,188	16.3	+7.3	3,070	15.8	+3.7
Liberal Democrats	Mike German	2,746	14.0	+3.1	2,512	13.0	-0.8
Plaid Cymru	Aneurin J.M. Preece	2,092	10.7	-0.2	1,913	9.9	-3.3
UKIP	David Rowlands	1,377	7.0	New	934	4.8	New
Green					618	3.2	Unknown
Socialist Labour					438	2.3	Unknown
BNP					336	1.7	New
Cymru Annibynnol					129	0.7	New
ProLife Alliance					73	0.4	New
Majority		6,964	35.6	+14.5			
Turnout		19,555	31.7	−7.5			
Labour hold		Swing					

2003 Electorate: 61,264
Regional ballots rejected: 335

=== Elections in the 1990s ===
Welsh Assembly Election 1999: Torfaen
Party	Candidate	Constituency			Regional		
Party	Candidate	Votes	%	±%	Votes	%	±%
Labour	Lynne Neagle	9,080	38.0	N/A	12,300	51.3	N/A
Independent Labour	Michael B. Gough	3,795	15.9	N/A			
Independent	Ingrid A. Nut	2,828	11.8	N/A			
Plaid Cymru	Noel G. Turner	2,614	10.9	N/A	3,978	16.6	N/A
Liberal Democrats	Jean E. Gray	2,614	10.9	N/A	3,303	13.8	N/A
Conservative	Kay P. Thomas	2,152	9.0	N/A	2,899	12.1	N/A
Local Socialist	Stephen P. Smith	839	3.5	N/A			
United Socialist					Unknown	Unknown	N/A
Others					1,511	6.3	N/A
Majority		5,285	22.1	N/A			
Turnout		23,922	39.2	N/A			
Labour win (new seat)							
