= William Graham (Welsh politician) =

Welsh politician

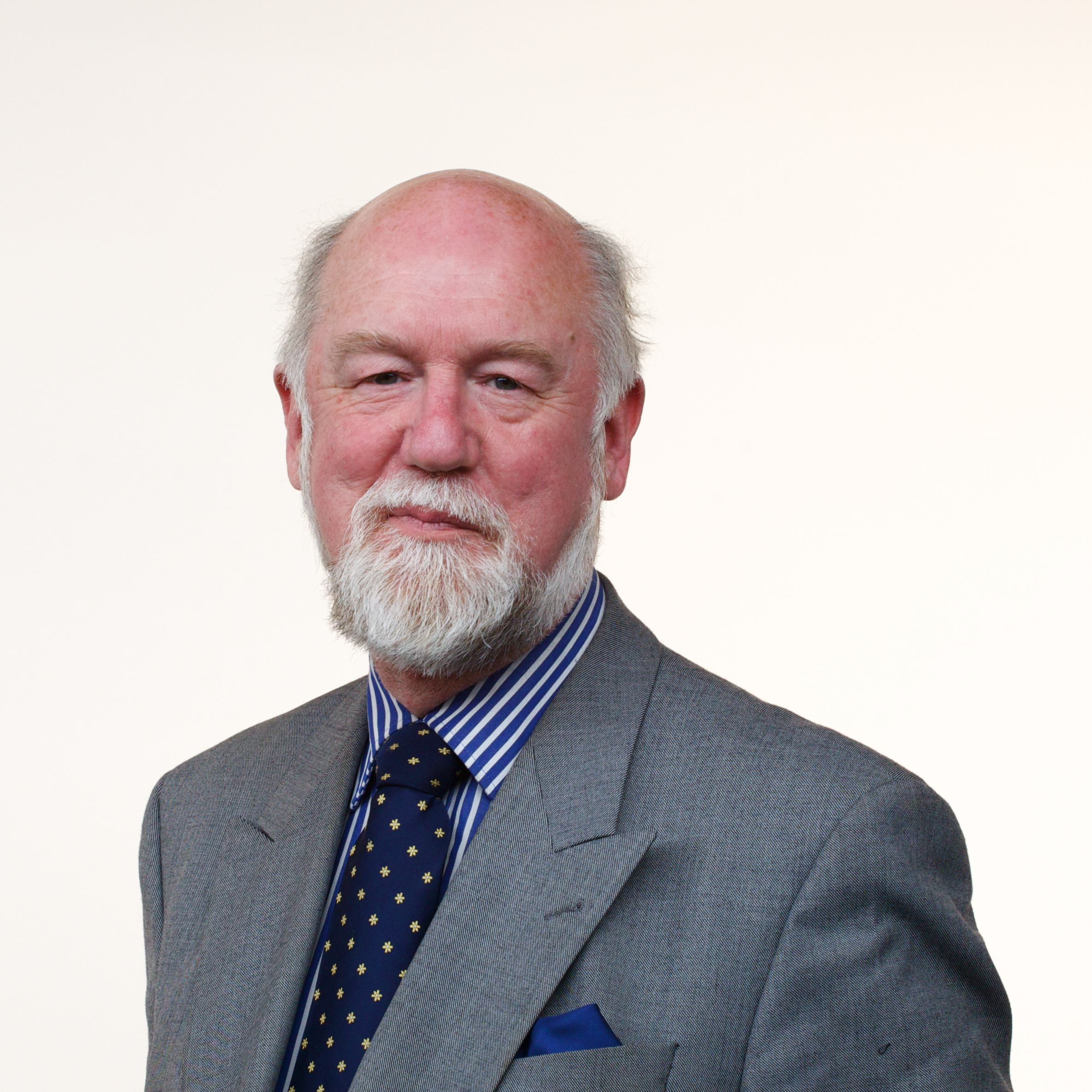

Shadow Leader of the House
- In office 11 July 2007 – 6 April 2016
- Leader: Andrew RT Davies
- Preceded by: (new post)

Shadow Chief Whip
- In office 11 July 2007 – 6 April 2016
- Leader: Nick Bourne; Paul Davies (interim); Andrew RT Davies
- Preceded by: Jocelyn Davies
- Succeeded by: Paul Davies (Note: In 2017)

Member of the Welsh Assembly for South Wales East
- In office 6 May 1999 – 6 April 2016
- Preceded by: New Assembly
- Succeeded by: Mark Reckless

Personal details
- Born: 18 November 1949 (age 76) Newport, Monmouthshire, Wales
- Party: Conservative
- Website: http://www.williamgrahamam.com

William Graham (born 18 November 1949 in Newport, Monmouthshire) is a Welsh Conservative politician, former Shadow Leader of the House in the National Assembly for Wales, Opposition Chief Whip and Shadow Minister for Social Services.

== Early and personal life ==
William Graham was born to the late William Douglas Graham and Eleanor Mary Scott (née Searle). Educated at Blackfriars School, and the College of Estate Management, he is the sixth generation principal of a family firm of surveyors in Newport established in 1844. Graham is a fellow of the Royal Institution of Chartered Surveyors, and has been Chairman of Newport Harbour Commission and Rougemont School Trust, Newport. He is also a member of the Listed Building Advisory Committee, the Rent Assessment Committee for Wales. He was appointed Justice of the Peace in 1979, and is a member of the Carlton Club.

Graham married his wife in 1981; the couple have three children.

== Political career ==
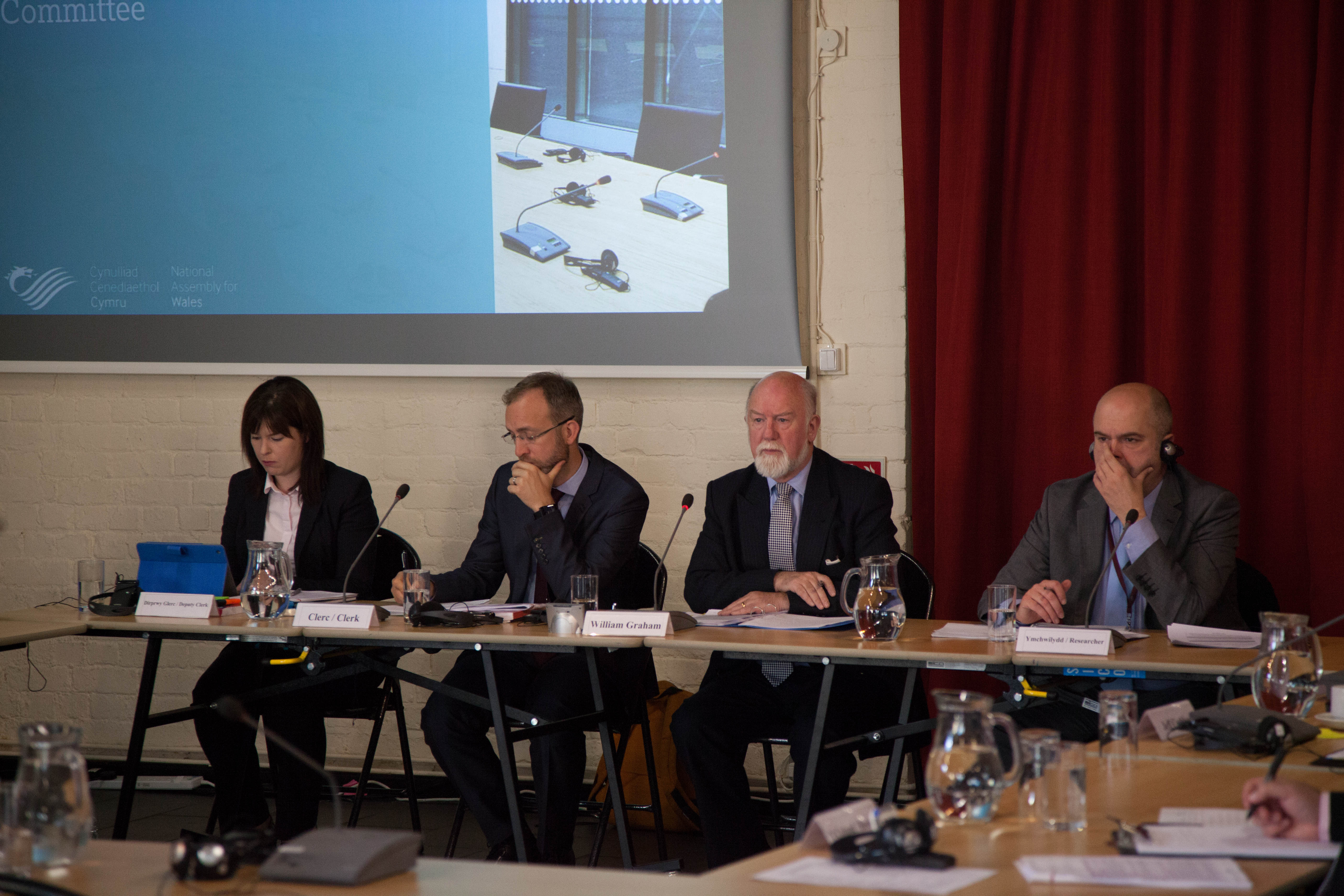
Graham in 2015; 3rd from left

Graham has been an active Conservative politician from the 1980s, when he was elected to Gwent County Council. He was then a Newport councillor, and Leader of the Conservative Group on the City Council until standing down in 2004.

Graham was a member of the National Assembly for Wales, representing South Wales East, from the first Assembly elections in May 1999 until 2016. He contested the Newport West Constituency in the 1999 and 2003 Assembly elections. As a result of changes to the election rules in the Government of Wales Act 2006, he was selected as leading Conservative List Candidate for South Wales East for the May 2007 and 2011 Assembly elections.

In the First Assembly was appointed as Committee Chair of the Pre 16 Education, Schools and Early Learning Committee. In the Second Assembly he was Chair of the Committee on School Funding and of the House Committee from 9 Nov 2006; Member of the Assembly Shadow Commission, set up to prepare the way for the Third Assembly; and Conservative education spokesman in the National Assembly, Chairman of the Conservative Group and Chief Whip.

In the Third Assembly he was appointed European Affairs spokesman for the Official Opposition and Conservative group chairman and Chief Whip. He was also appointed as the Conservative representative on the Assembly Commission. He was an Assembly Commissioner between 2007 and 2011. On 11 July 2007 he was appointed Shadow Leader of the House and Shadow Chief Whip. Graham served as the Shadow Minister for Social Services, in addition to being Business Manager and Chief Whip of the Welsh Conservative Group in the National Assembly from 2011.

== Offices held ==
Senedd
Preceded by (new post)	Assembly Member for South Wales East; 1999–2016	Succeeded by Mark Reckless
Preceded by (new post)	Assembly Commission; 2007–2016	Succeeded by TBA
Political offices
Preceded by (new post)	Chair of the Welsh Conservative group in the National Assembly; 1999–2016	Succeeded by TBA
Preceded by Jocelyn Davies	Shadow Chief Whip; 2007–2016	Succeeded by TBA
Preceded by (new post)	Shadow Leader of the House; 2007–2016	Succeeded by TBA
