= John Griffiths (Welsh politician) =

Welsh Labour politician and Member of the Senedd for Newport East

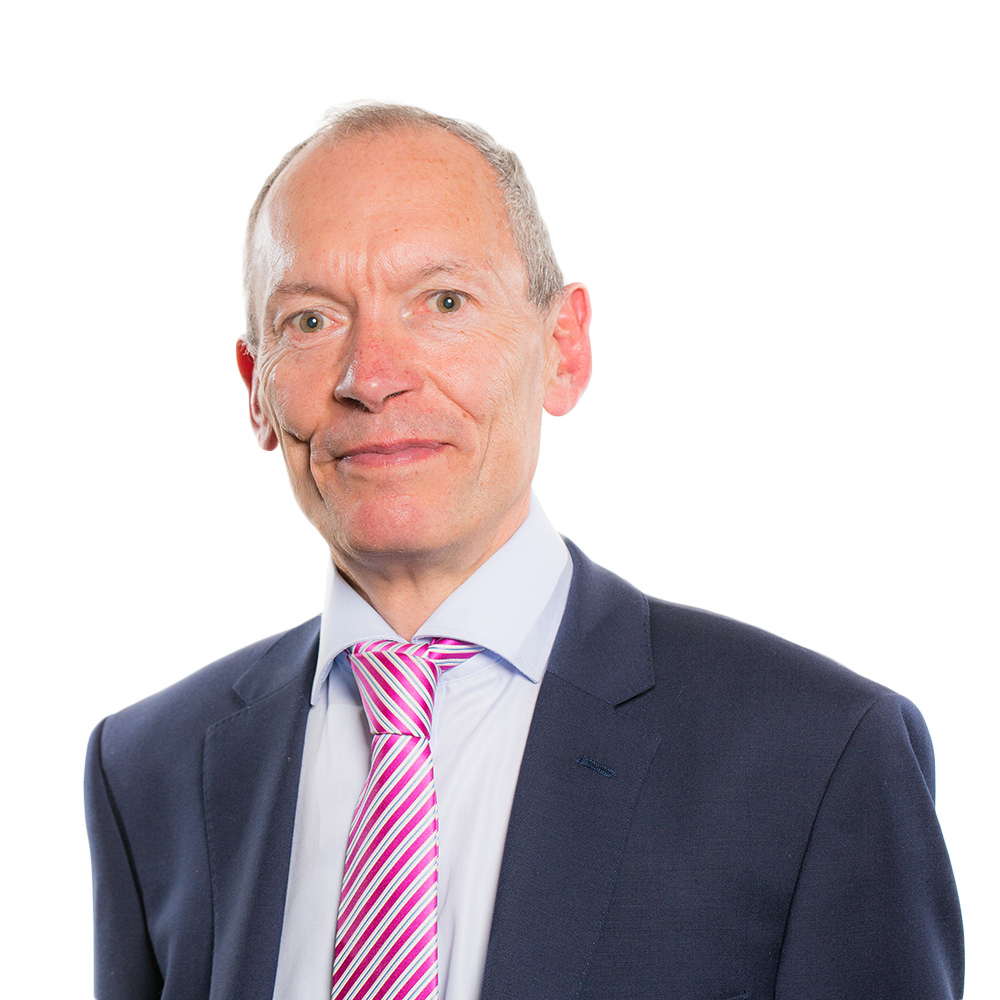
- Griffiths in 2016

Minister for Environment and Sustainable Development
- In office 13 May 2011 – 14 March 2013
- First Minister: Carwyn Jones
- Preceded by: Jane Davidson
- Succeeded by: Carl Sargeant^{[a]}

Counsel General for Wales
- In office 9 December 2009 – 13 May 2011
- First Minister: Carwyn Jones
- Preceded by: Carwyn Jones
- Succeeded by: Theodore Huckle

Member of the Senedd for Newport East
- In office 6 May 1999 – 7 April 2026
- Preceded by: Office established
- Succeeded by: Seat abolished
- Majority: 3,584 (15.5%)

Personal details
- Born: 19 December 1956 (age 69) Newport, Monmouthshire, Wales
- Party: Labour and Co-operative
- Education: University of Wales
- Profession: Politician; Barrister
- a. As Minister for Natural Resources.

John Griffiths (born 19 December 1956) is a Welsh Labour and Co-operative politician who previously served as Minister for Environment and Sustainable Development from 2011 to 2013. Griffiths represented the constituency of Newport East in the Senedd from 1999 until 2026.

== Education ==
Griffiths studied law as a mature student at the University of Wales.

== Professional career ==
Before his election to the Senedd, he was a practising solicitor (criminal law, personal injury and general civil litigation).

== Political career ==
He is a former councillor on Gwent County Council and Newport CBC. He is a member of Labour's National Policy Forum, the Co-operative Party, Workers' Educational Association and Full Employment Forum. He is a committed republican, and a member of the ISTC trade union. Griffiths has been a Member of the Senedd for Newport East since 1999. His political interests include economic development, social inclusion, education and Europe.

In the Senedd he was appointed Deputy Minister for Health and Social Care (Older People) from May 2003 until May 2007. In the Third Assembly was appointed Deputy Minister for Education, Culture and the Welsh Language (31 May 2007) and retained that position when the coalition government of Plaid Cymru and Labour was announced on 19 July. John supported Carwyn Jones in the Welsh Labour leadership contest in 2009, and went on to support Mark Drakeford in 2018. He was appointed Counsel General and Leader of the Legislative Programme in the Welsh Assembly in December 2009, a job previously done by First Minister Carwyn Jones.

Griffiths stood down at the 2026 Senedd election.

Senedd
New constituency	Member of the Senedd for Newport East; 1999–2026	Succeeded by Constituency abolished
Political offices
New post	Deputy Minister for Health and Social Services (Older People and Public Health); 2005–2007	post re-organised
Preceded by Brian Gibbons	Deputy Minister for Health and Social Care; 2007 (31 May to 19 July)	Succeeded by Gwenda Thomas
New post	Deputy Minister for Education, Culture and Welsh Language; 2007 (July – October)	post re-organised
New post	Deputy Minister for Skills; 2007–2009	post re-organised
Preceded by Jane Davidson	Minister for Environment and Sustainable Development; 2011–2013	post re-organised
Legal offices
Preceded by Carwyn Jones	Counsel General for Wales; 2009–2011	Succeeded by Theodore Huckle QC
