= Rosemary Butler (politician) =

British politician

The Right Honourable Dame Rosemary Butler DBE
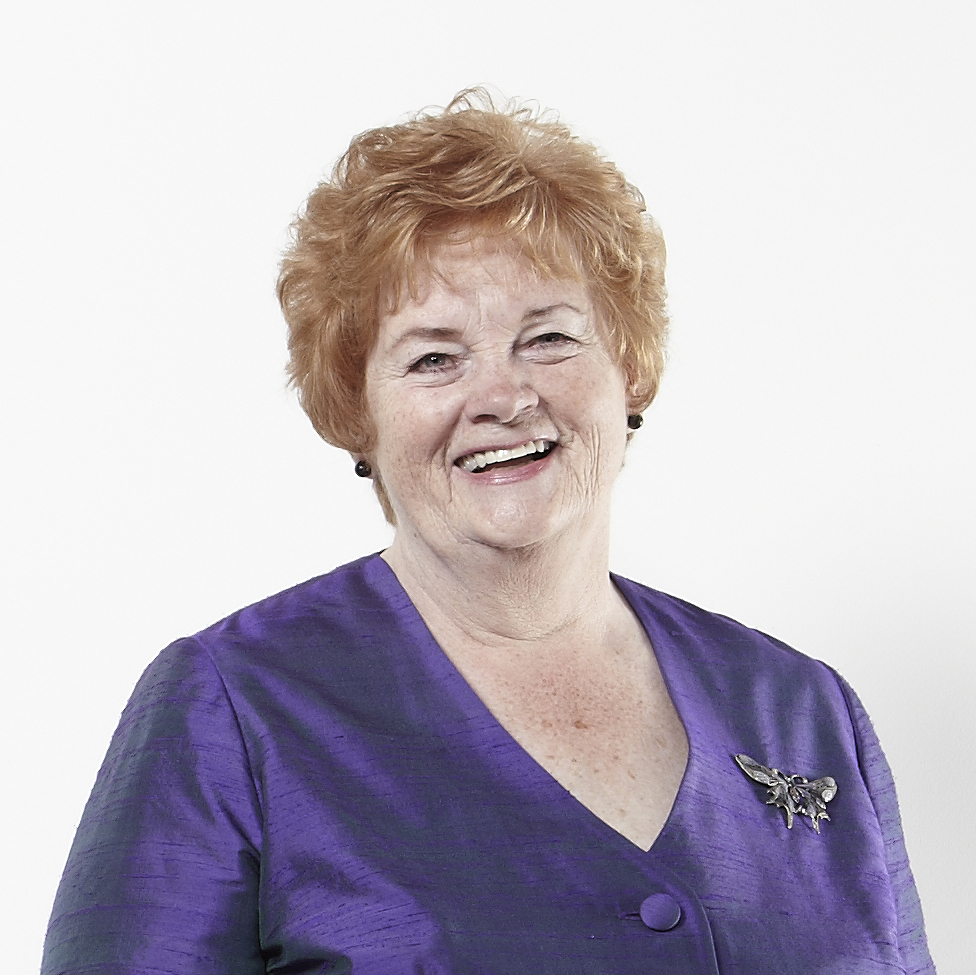

Presiding Officer of the National Assembly for Wales
- In office 11 May 2011 – 11 May 2016
- Monarch: Elizabeth II
- First Minister: Carwyn Jones
- Deputy: David Melding
- Preceded by: Dafydd Elis-Thomas
- Succeeded by: Elin Jones

Deputy Presiding Officer
- In office 9 May 2007 – 11 May 2011
- Preceded by: John Marek
- Succeeded by: David Melding

Minister for Education
- In office 25 May 1999 – 18 October 2000
- First Secretary: Alun Michael; Rhodri Morgan
- Preceded by: Office Created
- Succeeded by: Jane Davidson

Assembly Member for Newport West
- In office 6 May 1999 – 6 April 2016
- Preceded by: Office Created
- Succeeded by: Jayne Bryant

Personal details
- Born: Rosemary Janet Mair McGrath; 21 January 1943 (age 83) Much Wenlock, Shropshire, England, UK
- Party: Welsh Labour Party
- Spouse: Derek Butler (1966–present)
- Children: 2

Dame Rosemary Janet Mair Butler DBE (née McGrath; born 21 January 1943) is a British politician who served as Presiding Officer of the National Assembly for Wales (now Llywydd of the Senedd) from 2011 to 2016. A member of Welsh Labour, Butler was the Assembly Member (AM; now Member of the Senedd) for Newport West from 1999 to 2016.

Serving briefly as Secretary for Education in the first two years of the Welsh Government, she was elected Deputy Presiding Officer in May 2007. In May 2011, Butler was elected as the Presiding Officer. She did not stand for election to the Assembly in the 2016 elections.

== Local politics ==
In 1971 Butler joined the Labour Party. She was elected to Newport Borough Council from Caerleon ward in 1973, and played an important part in Labour administrations on the council as Deputy Leader and Mayor of Newport in 1989–90. She was Chair of the Leisure Services Committee for 12 years.

== National Assembly ==
At the first Assembly election in 1999, Butler was selected as Labour candidate for Newport West which she won. She was appointed Secretary for Education: Minister for Children and Young People (up to 16) by Alun Michael but held office only for a year, leaving in October 2000 when the new First Secretary (First Minister), Rhodri Morgan, formed a coalition government. She was Chair of the Assembly's Culture, Welsh Language and Sport Committee and served on the Panel of Chairs. She led the British Council activities in the Senedd (housing the Assembly) and also represents the Senedd on the European Committee of the Regions (CoR) where she is a member of the Bureau (executive) of the committee.

== Presiding Officer and Deputy Presiding Officer ==
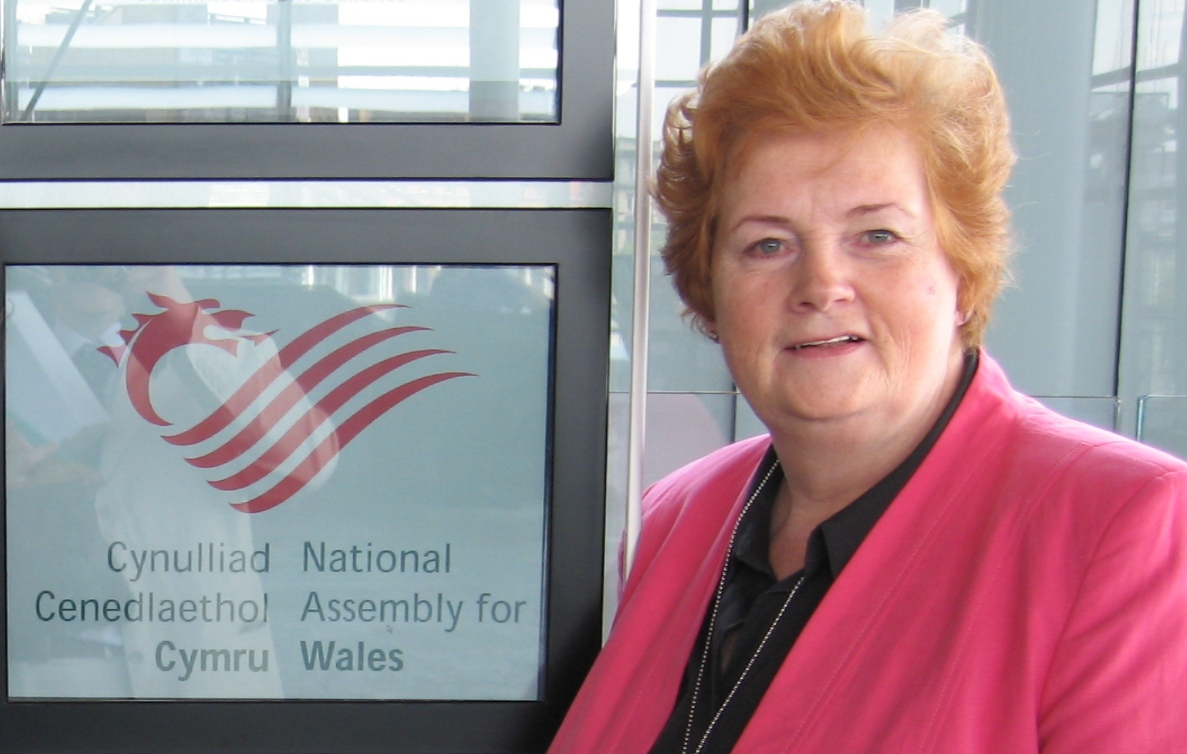
Rosemary Butler at the Senedd

On 9 May 2007, Butler was picked as the Labour group's nominee for Deputy Presiding Officer, a position vacant by the defeat of the previous holder and which had to be held by a member from a different party to the Presiding Officer. Her election by the whole of the Assembly was not opposed. Butler was appointed the second Presiding Officer of the National Assembly for Wales on 11 May 2011, following Dafydd Elis-Thomas.

Butler was appointed Dame Commander of the Order of the British Empire (DBE) in the 2014 New Year Honours for political and public services, particularly to women.

== Personal interests ==
- Honorary Fellow of the University of Wales, Newport
- Co-founder and Chair of the Newport International Competition for Young Pianists
- An Honorary Citizen of Newport's twin town Kutaisi (Republic of Georgia), and founding member of the Newport-Kutaisi Twinning Association
- President of the Friends of Newport Transporter Bridge
- President of the Wales Home Safety Council
- President of Newport Harriers Athletic Club
- Honorary Life Member of Newport Sports Council
- Life Member of Newport Cricket Club
- Founder member of the Friends of Tredegar House
- Ambassador for Girl Guiding
- Founder member of Newport Women's Aid
- Member of Women's International League of Peace and Freedom
- Patron of Caerleon Arts Festival
- Chairwoman, Newport Women's Forum
- Chairwoman, Live Music Now Wales

== Offices held ==
Senedd
Preceded by (new post)	Assembly Member for Newport West; 1999–2016	Succeeded by Jayne Bryant
Preceded by Dafydd Elis-Thomas	Presiding Officer of the National Assembly for Wales; 2011–2016	Succeeded by Elin Jones
Preceded by John Marek	Deputy Presiding Officer of the National Assembly for Wales; 2007–2011	Succeeded by David Melding
Political offices
Preceded by (new post)	Minister for Education; 1999–2000	Succeeded by Jane Davidson
Preceded by TBC	Member of the EU Committee of the Regions; 2002–2007	Succeeded by Christine Chapman
