= Merthyr Tydfil and Rhymney (Senedd constituency) =

Senedd constituency (1999–2026)

Coordinates: 51.751°N 3.311°W

Merthyr Tydfil and Rhymney Merthyr Tudful a Rhymni
- Former Senedd county constituency for the Senedd
- Merthyr Tydfil and Rhymney as one of the 40; Senedd constituencies

Former Senedd county constituency
- Created: 1999
- Abolished: 2026
- Party: Welsh Labour
- MS: Dawn Bowden
- Electoral region: South Wales East

Merthyr Tydfil and Rhymney (Welsh: Merthyr Tudful a Rhymni) was a constituency of the Senedd. It elected one Member of the Senedd by the first past the post method of election. Also, however, it was one of eight constituencies in the South Wales East electoral region, which elected four additional members, in addition to eight constituency members, to produce a degree of proportional representation for the region as a whole.

== Boundaries ==
Map of 1999–2026 boundaries

The constituency was created for the first election to the Assembly, in 1999, with the name and boundaries of the Merthyr Tydfil and Rhymney Westminster constituency.

The other seven constituencies of the South Wales East electoral region were Blaenau Gwent, Caerphilly, Islwyn, Monmouth, Newport East, Newport West and Torfaen.

== Voting ==
In general elections for the Senedd, each voter had two votes. The first vote was used to vote for a candidate to become the Member of the Senedd for the voter's constituency, elected by the first past the post system. The second vote was used to vote for a regional closed party list of candidates. Additional member seats were allocated from the lists by the d'Hondt method, with constituency results being taken into account in the allocation.

== Assembly Members and Members of the Senedd ==
| Election | Member | Party | Portrait |
|---|---|---|---|
| 1999 | Huw Lewis | Labour Co-op | |
| 2016 | Dawn Bowden | Labour Co-op | |

== Elections ==
=== Elections in the 2020s ===
2021 Senedd election: Merthyr Tydfil and Rhymney
| Party | Candidate | Constituency | | | Regional | | |
| Party | Candidate | Votes | % | ±% | Votes | % | ±% |
|---|---|---|---|---|---|---|---|
| Labour | Dawn Bowden (Note: Incumbent member for this constituency) | 13,009 | 61.5 | +14.3 | 11,181 | 52.9 | +6.0 |
| Plaid Cymru | Ian Gwynne | 3,698 | 17.5 | -0.5 | 3,787 | 17.9 | +1.4 |
| Conservative | Donna Gavin | 2,665 | 12.6 | +6.2 | 2,879 | 13.6 | +7.2 |
| Abolish | Hugh Moelwyn Hughes | 656 | 3.1 | New | 866 | 4.1 | +1.1 |
| Liberal Democrats | Jez Becker | 420 | 2.0 | -3.4 | 426 | 2.0 | -1.3 |
| UKIP | George Alexandrov Pykov | 382 | 1.8 | -18.9 | 444 | 2.1 | -18.4 |
| Reform | Colin Jones | 324 | 1.5 | New | 278 | 1.3 | New |
| Green | | | | | 580 | 2.7 | +0.7 |
| Gwlad | | | | | 230 | 1.1 | New |
| No More Lockdowns | | | | | 193 | 0.9 | New |
| Propel | | | | | 123 | 0.6 | New |
| Communist | | | | | 87 | 0.4 | ±0.0 |
| TUSC | | | | | 44 | 0.2 | -0.2 |
| Majority | | 9,311 | 44.0 | +14.5 | | | |
| Turnout | | 21,154 | 34.8 | −3.7 | | | |
| Labour hold | | Swing | | | | | |
Notes

Regional Ballot void votes: 162. Want of an Official Mark (0), Voting for more than ONE party or individual candidate (58), Writing or mark by which the Voter could be identified (0), Unmarked or Void for uncertainty (104)

=== Elections in the 2010s ===
Welsh Assembly Election 2016: Merthyr Tydfil and Rhymney
| Party | Candidate | Constituency | | | Regional | | |
| Party | Candidate | Votes | % | ±% | Votes | % | ±% |
|---|---|---|---|---|---|---|---|
| Labour | Dawn Bowden | 9,763 | 47.2 | -7.1 | 9,666 | 46.9 | -9.0 |
| UKIP | David Rowlands | 4,277 | 20.7 | New | 4,230 | 20.5 | +16.0 |
| Plaid Cymru | Brian Thomas | 3,721 | 18.0 | +9.2 | 3,399 | 16.5 | +4.3 |
| Conservative | Elizabeth Simon | 1,331 | 6.4 | +0.1 | 1,340 | 6.4 | -1.7 |
| Liberal Democrats | Bob Griffin | 1,122 | 5.4 | -7.4 | 692 | 3.3 | -3.8 |
| Green | Julie Colbran | 469 | 2.3 | New | 404 | 2.0 | -0.3 |
| Abolish | | | | | 617 | 3.0 | New |
| Monster Raving Loony | | | | | 122 | 0.6 | New |
| TUSC | | | | | 76 | 0.4 | New |
| Communist | | | | | 85 | 0.4 | -0.2 |
| National Front | | | | | 68 | 0.3 | New |
| Majority | | 5,486 | 25.5 | −11.0 | | | |
| Turnout | | 20,683 | 38.5 | +3.2 | | | |
| Labour hold | | Swing | -13.9 | | | | |

Welsh Assembly Election 2011: Merthyr Tydfil and Rhymney
| Party | Candidate | Constituency | | | Regional | | |
| Party | Candidate | Votes | % | ±% | Votes | % | ±% |
|---|---|---|---|---|---|---|---|
| Labour Co-op | Huw Lewis | 10,483 | 54.3 | +17.3 | 10,779 | 55.9 | +13.8 |
| Independent | Tony Rogers | 3,432 | 17.8 | New | | | |
| Liberal Democrats | Amy Kitcher | 2,480 | 12.8 | −2.4 | 1,374 | 7.1 | -6.9 |
| Plaid Cymru | Noel Turner | 1,701 | 8.8 | −3.2 | 2,363 | 12.2 | -4.6 |
| Conservative | Chris O'Brien | 1,224 | 6.3 | +0.8 | 1,554 | 8.1 | +0.4 |
| UKIP | | | | | 859 | 4.5 | -1.2 |
| BNP | | | | | 726 | 3.8 | -0.6 |
| Socialist Labour | | | | | 711 | 3.7 | +1.7 |
| Green | | | | | 445 | 2.3 | ±0.0 |
| Welsh Christian | | | | | 324 | 1.7 | +0.4 |
| Communist | | | | | 112 | 0.6 | ±0.0 |
| English Democrat | | | | | 52 | 0.3 | +0.1 |
| Majority | | 7,051 | 36.5 | +14.7 | | | |
| Turnout | | 19,320 | 35.3 | −3.6 | | | |
| Labour Co-op hold | | Swing | | | | | |

Regional ballots rejected at the count: 138

=== Elections in the 2000s ===
Welsh Assembly Election 2007: Merthyr Tydfil and Rhymney
| Party | Candidate | Constituency | | | Regional | | |
| Party | Candidate | Votes | % | ±% | Votes | % | ±% |
|---|---|---|---|---|---|---|---|
| Labour Co-op | Huw Lewis | 7,776 | 37.0 | −23.5 | 8,849 | 42.1 | -14.1 |
| Liberal Democrats | Amy Kitcher | 3,195 | 15.2 | +8.0 | 2,946 | 14.0 | +5.7 |
| Independent | Clive Tovey | 2,622 | 12.5 | New | | | |
| Plaid Cymru | Glyndwr Jones | 2,519 | 12.0 | −4.2 | 3,529 | 16.8 | +0.7 |
| Independent | Jeff Edwards | 1,915 | 9.1 | New | | | |
| Conservative | Giles Howard | 1,151 | 5.5 | −2.9 | 1,612 | 7.7 | -0.5 |
| Independent | Jock Greer | 844 | 4.0 | New | | | |
| Independent | Vivienne Elliott-Hadley | 809 | 3.8 | New | | | |
| Independent | Richard D.M. Williams | 162 | 0.8 | New | | | |
| UKIP | | | | | 1,191 | 5.7 | +2.9 |
| BNP | | | | | 922 | 4.4 | +3.4 |
| Independent - Colin Hobbs | | | | | 537 | 2.6 | New |
| Green | | | | | 475 | 2.3 | -0.1 |
| Socialist Labour | | | | | 424 | 2.0 | -1.3 |
| Welsh Christian Party | | | | | 275 | 1.3 | New |
| Communist | | | | | 130 | 0.6 | New |
| CPA | | | | | 77 | 0.4 | New |
| English Democrat | | | | | 33 | 0.2 | New |
| Majority | | 4,518 | 21.8 | −22.5 | | | |
| Turnout | | 20,993 | 38.9 | +6.1 | | | |
| Labour Co-op hold | | Swing | −15.8 | | | | |

Welsh Assembly Election 2003: Merthyr Tydfil and Rhymney
| Party | Candidate | Constituency | | | Regional | | |
| Party | Candidate | Votes | % | ±% | Votes | % | ±% |
|---|---|---|---|---|---|---|---|
| Labour Co-op | Huw Lewis (Note: Incumbent member for this constituency) | 11,148 | 60.5 | +16.6 | 10,317 | 56.2 | +11.9 |
| Plaid Cymru | Alun G. Cox | 2,988 | 16.2 | −10.9 | 2,965 | 16.1 | -18.4 |
| Conservative | John L. Prosser | 1,539 | 8.4 | +3.4 | 1,515 | 8.2 | +2.3 |
| Independent | Neil Greer | 1,423 | 7.7 | New | | | |
| Liberal Democrats | John A. Ault | 1,324 | 7.2 | +0.5 | 1,529 | 8.3 | -1.5 |
| Socialist Labour | | | | | 599 | 3.3 | +0.9 |
| UKIP | | | | | 507 | 2.8 | New |
| Green | | | | | 436 | 2.4 | +0.4 |
| Cymru Annibynnol | | | | | 252 | 1.4 | New |
| BNP | | | | | 175 | 1.0 | New |
| ProLife Alliance | | | | | 77 | 0.4 | New |
| Majority | | 8,160 | 44.3 | +27.5 | | | |
| Turnout | | 18,422 | 32.8 | −12.1 | | | |
| Labour Co-op hold | | Swing | +13.8 | | | | |

2003 Electorate: 55,768
Regional ballots rejected: 228

=== Elections in the 1990s ===
Welsh Assembly Election 1999: Merthyr Tydfil and Rhymney
| Party | Candidate | Constituency | | | Regional | | |
| Party | Candidate | Votes | % | ±% | Votes | % | ±% |
|---|---|---|---|---|---|---|---|
| Labour Co-op | Huw Lewis | 11,024 | 43.9 | N/A | 11,076 | 44.3 | N/A |
| Plaid Cymru | Alun Cox | 6,810 | 27.1 | N/A | 8,546 | 34.2 | N/A |
| Independent | Tony Rogers | 3,746 | 14.9 | N/A | | | |
| Liberal Democrats | Elwyn Jones | 1,682 | 6.7 | N/A | 2,446 | 9.8 | N/A |
| Conservative | Carole M. Hyde | 1,246 | 5.0 | N/A | 1,470 | 5.9 | N/A |
| Socialist Alliance | Michael Jenkins | 580 | 2.3 | N/A | | | |
| Socialist Labour | | | | | 588 | 2.4 | N/A |
| Green | | | | | 512 | 2.0 | N/A |
| United Socialist | | | | | 207 | 0.8 | N/A |
| Others | | | | | 114 | 0.6 | N/A |
| Majority | | 4,214 | 16.8 | N/A | | | |
| Turnout | | 25,088 | 44.9 | N/A | | | |
| Labour Co-op win (new seat) | | | | | | | |

1999 Electorate: 55,676

== See also ==
- Merthyr Tydfil and Rhymney (UK Parliament constituency)
- Pontypridd Cynon Merthyr
