= 2021 Senedd election =

General election held in Wales on 6 May 2021

- 6 May 2021

All 60 seats to the Senedd 31 seats needed for a majority
- Opinion polls
- Registered: 2,389,879
- Turnout: 46.6% ▲1.2%
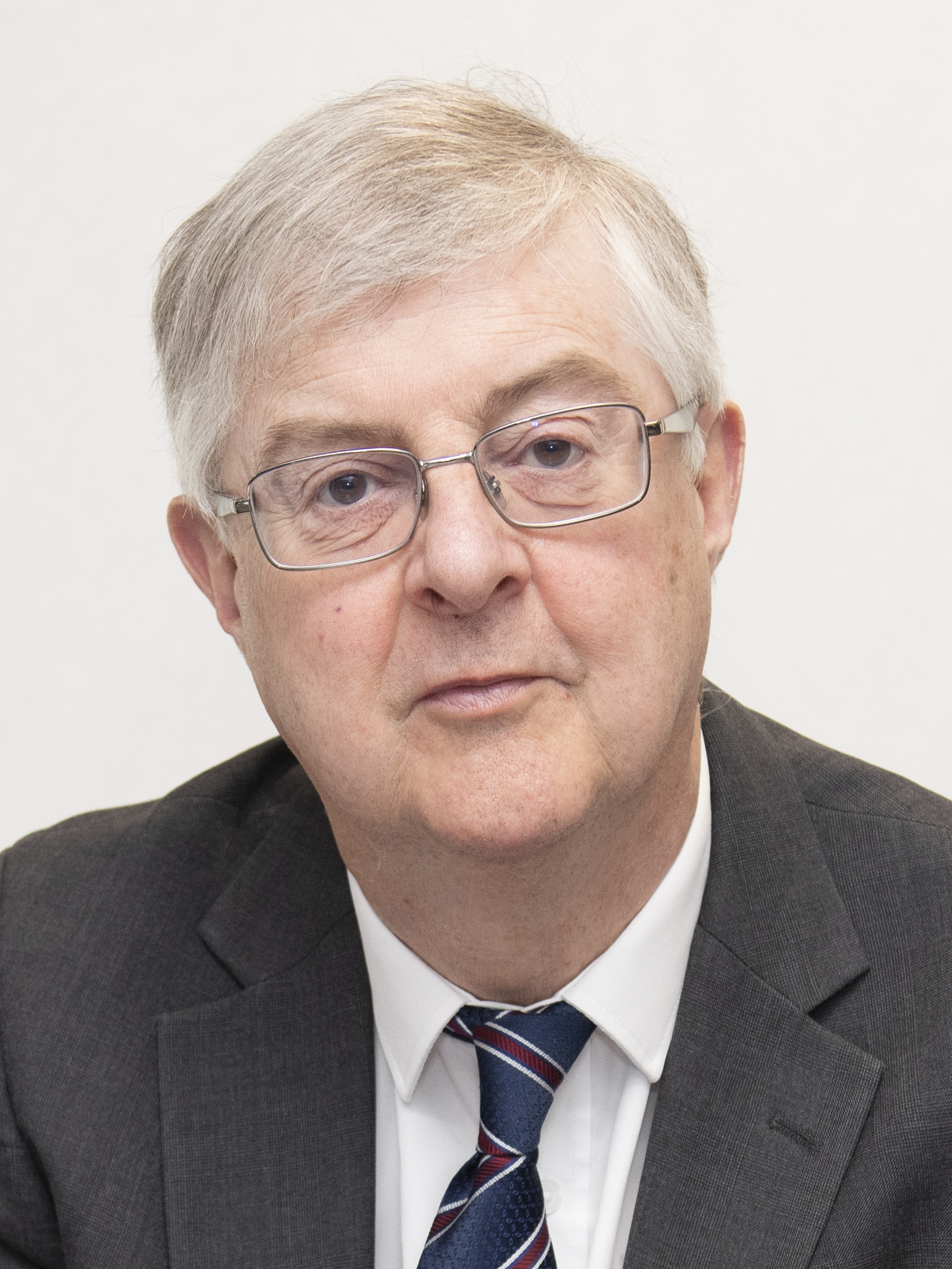

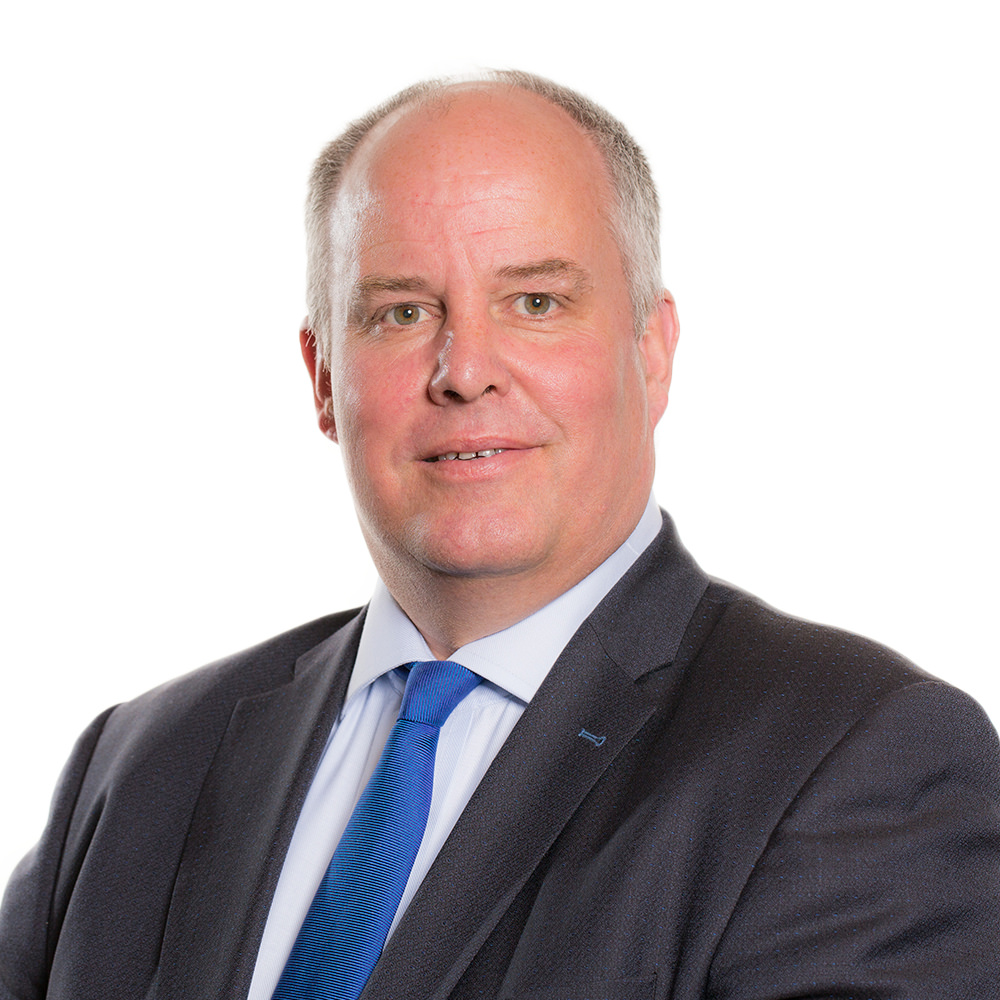

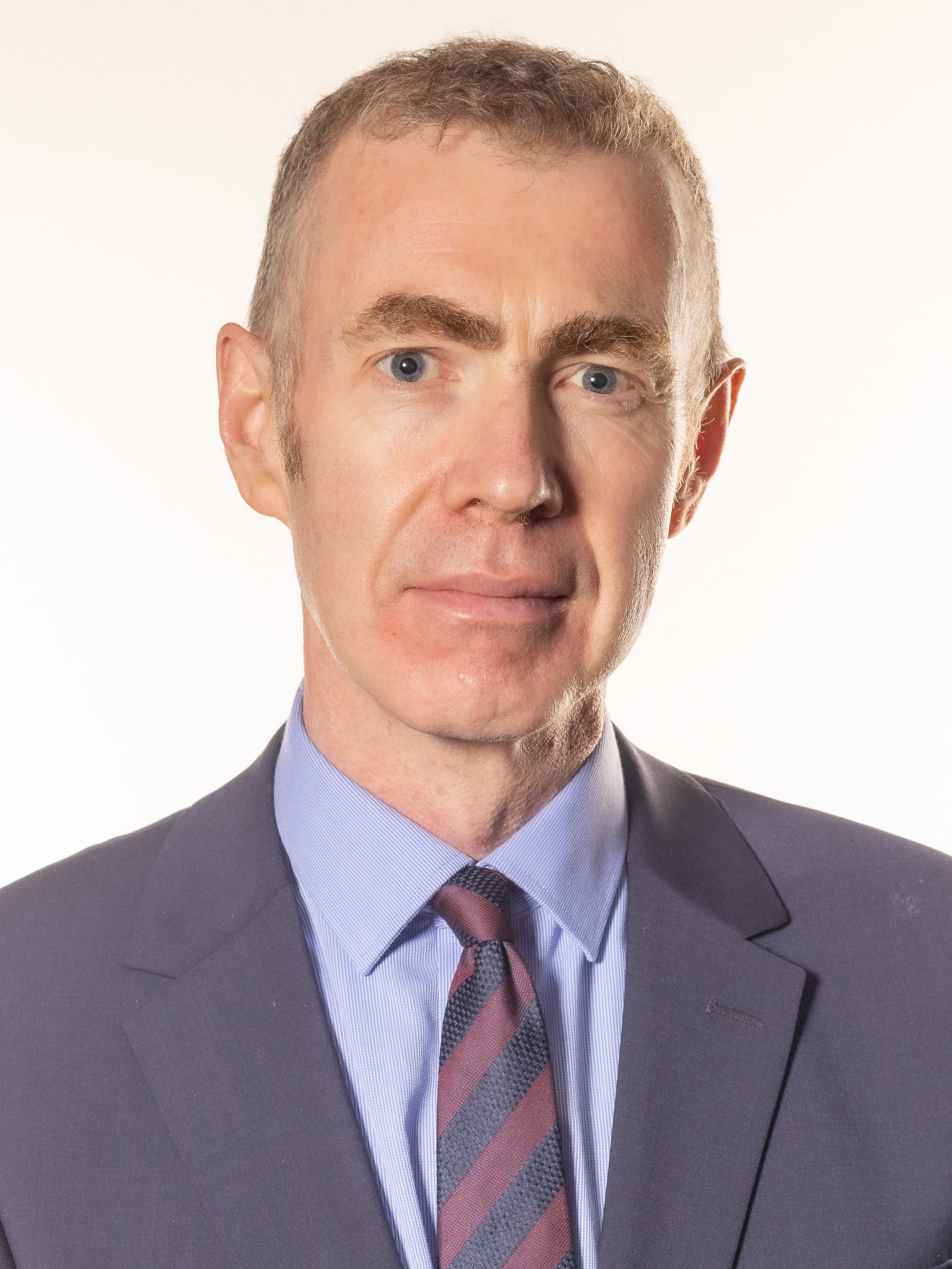

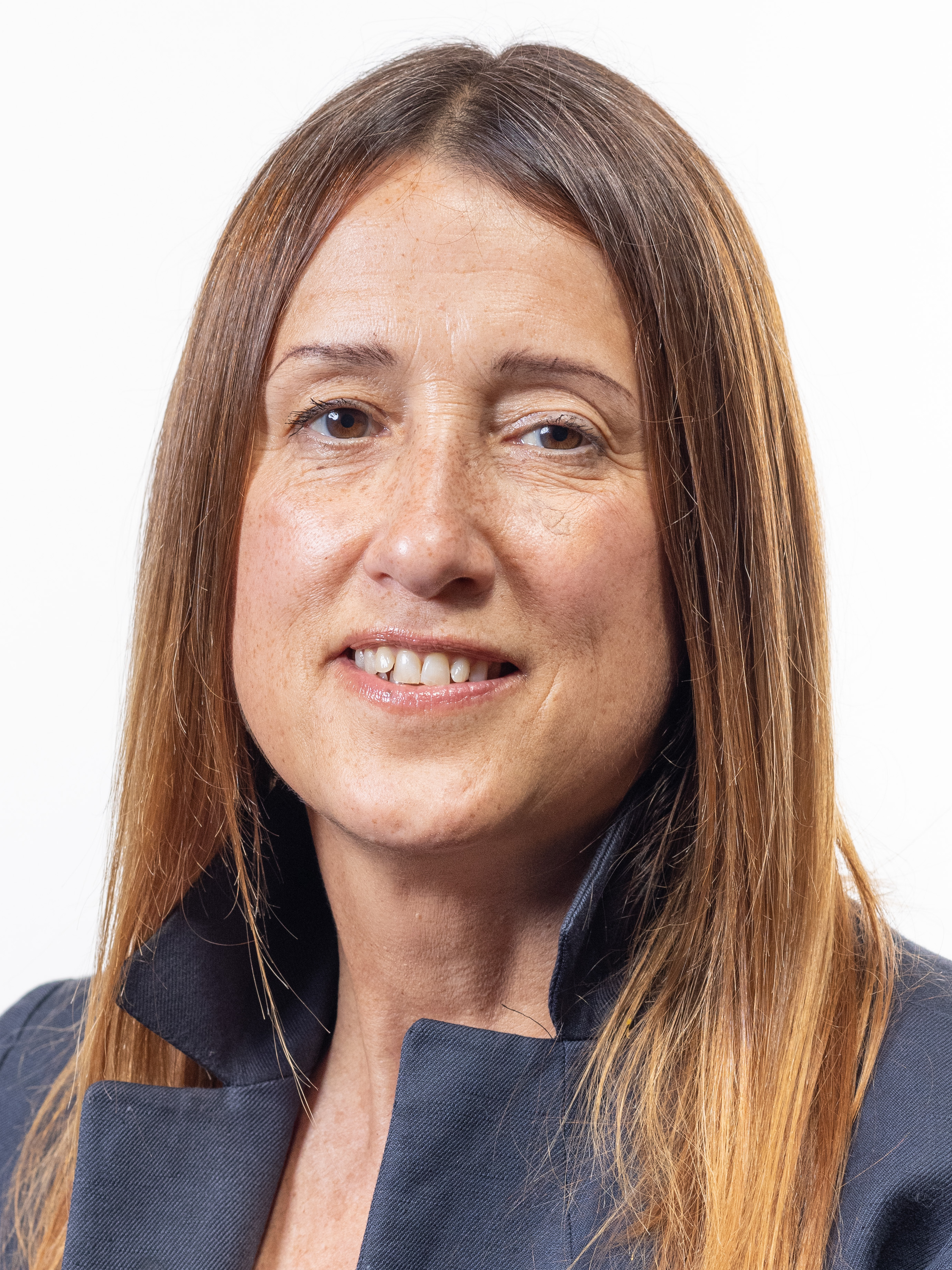
	First party	Second party
Leader	Mark Drakeford	Andrew RT Davies
Party	Labour	Conservative
Leader since	6 December 2018	24 January 2021
Leader's seat	Cardiff West	South Wales Central
Last election	29 seats	11 seats
Seats before	29 (Note: Includes 13 MSs sponsored by the Co-operative Party, who are designated Labour and Co-operative.)	10
Seats won	30 (Note: Includes 16 MSs sponsored by the Co-operative Party, who are designated Labour and Co-operative.)	16
Seat change	▲1	▲5
Constituency vote	443,047	289,802
% and swing	39.9% ▲5.2 pp	26.1% ▲5.0 pp
Regional vote	401,770	278,560
% and swing	36.2% ▲4.7 pp	25.1% ▲6.3 pp
	Third party	Fourth party
Leader	Adam Price	Jane Dodds
Party	Plaid Cymru	Liberal Democrats
Leader since	28 September 2018	3 November 2017
Leader's seat	Carmarthen East and Dinefwr	Ran in Mid and West Wales (won)
Last election	12 seats	1 seat
Seats before	10	1
Seats won	13	1
Seat change	▲1	Steady
Constituency vote	225,376	54,202
% and swing	20.3% ▼0.2 pp	4.9% ▼2.8 pp
Regional vote	230,161	48,217
% and swing	20.7% ▼0.1 pp	4.3% ▼2.2 pp
First Minister before election
Mark Drakeford
Labour
First Minister after election
Mark Drakeford
Labour

An election for the Senedd (Welsh Parliament; Welsh: Senedd Cymru) took place on Thursday 6 May 2021 to elect 60 members to the Senedd. It was the sixth devolved general election since the Senedd (formerly the National Assembly for Wales) was established in 1999. The election was held alongside the Scottish Parliament election, English local elections, London Assembly and mayoral election and the Hartlepool by-election.

It was the first election in which 16- and 17-year-olds and legally resident foreign nationals were allowed to vote in Wales, the largest extension of the franchise in Wales since 1969. Both changes were a result of the Senedd and Elections (Wales) Act 2020. It was also the first election for the legislature under its new name – 'Senedd Cymru' or 'the Welsh Parliament' – and thus this election may be called the "2021 Welsh Parliament election", or "2021 Senedd Cymru election", in preference over the shorter name.

Five parties had Members of the Senedd (MSs, formerly Assembly Members – AMs) elected at the previous election: Welsh Labour, the Welsh Conservatives, Plaid Cymru, the UK Independence Party (UKIP), and the Welsh Liberal Democrats. Seven political parties were represented in the Senedd prior to the election. These are the five aforementioned parties and two parties that gained MSs who were elected for – and moved from – other political parties. The Abolish the Welsh Assembly Party gained two MSs who were elected for UKIP in 2016, and Propel (previously the Welsh Nation Party) gained an MS elected for Plaid Cymru in 2016.

The governing Labour Party's share of the constituency vote increased by over 5%, and the regional vote by over 4%, with thirty Labour MSs elected accounting for exactly half of the sixty seats, one more than in 2016 but one short of an overall majority and remaining as the largest party. The Conservatives became the Senedd's second-largest party and the official opposition to the Welsh Government with sixteen MSs elected, five more than their 2016 result. This result is the best that the Conservatives managed to achieve since the Senedd was established. Plaid Cymru slipped down to third place with thirteen MSs elected, one more than in 2016. Coalition partner, the Liberal Democrats lost their single constituency seat from 2016, but gained a regional list seat, keeping their total of one seat, the same as in 2016. UKIP received no seats, down from their seven in the 2016 election. This included seats later transferred to Abolish the Welsh Assembly, who also received no seats.

Voter turnout was 46.6%, a record for a Senedd election at the time.

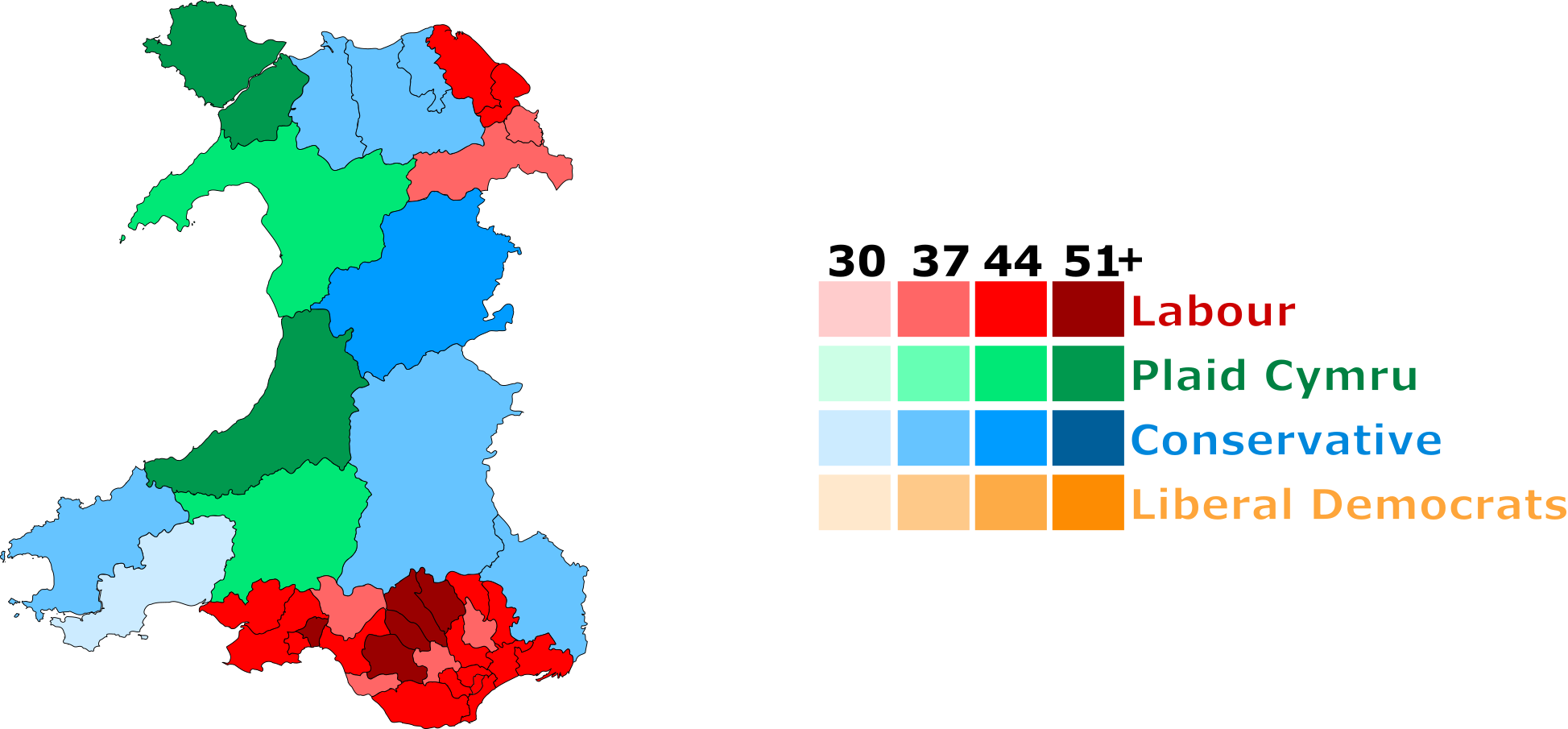
Percentage vote share of the 2021 Senedd election by constituency

== Electoral system ==
In elections for the Senedd, using the additional member system, each voter has two votes. The first vote is for a member for the voter's constituency, elected by the first past the post system. The second vote is for a regional closed party list of candidates. Additional member seats are allocated from the lists by the D'Hondt method, with constituency results being taken into account in the allocation. In this election the system achieved a broadly proportional result in the North Wales and Mid and West Wales electoral regions. However, as in previous elections, the large number of constituency seats won by the Labour Party in the South Wales West, South Wales Central and South Wales East electoral regions, when set against the small proportion of available additional regional seats, means that the Labour Party is over-represented by a margin of four seats, when considered on a proportional basis.

Under the Wales Act 2014, a candidate is allowed to stand in both a constituency and a regional list. However, holding a dual mandate with the House of Commons is illegal, meaning a Member of the Senedd cannot also be an MP.

This was the first election where 16- and 17-year olds could vote, following the enactment of Senedd and Elections (Wales) Act in January 2020.

The registration deadline for voters in this election was 11:59 pm, 19 April 2021.

== Background ==
The 2019 European Parliament election in the United Kingdom was the last of its kind. The newly formed Brexit Party came out on top in Wales. Plaid Cymru, who support full Welsh independence, came second, marking the first time it had beaten Labour in a Wales-wide election. The Brexit Party also formed a parliamentary group in the Assembly made up of the four ex-UK Independence Party (UKIP) members, led by Mark Reckless. A snap general election in the United Kingdom was held on 12 December 2019. Welsh Labour suffered an 8% drop in their vote, losing all their seats in North Wales, except for Alyn and Deeside. Labour ended up losing six parliamentary seats to the Welsh Conservatives in Boris Johnson's landslide victory. These seats included Bridgend, which has been represented on the assembly level by former First Minister of Wales Carwyn Jones since the 1999 election. The Conservatives also picked up Brecon and Radnorshire from the Welsh Liberal Democrats.

On 31 January 2020, the United Kingdom left the European Union. This followed a referendum on the matter in which Wales narrowly voted to leave the EU. South Wales has been highlighted by many as evidence that Brexit cut across traditional party allegiances, as the area typically votes overwhelmingly for Labour. The band of eight local authorities covering the Valleys area from Swansea in the west to Torfaen in the east, plus the coastal city of Newport, all voted in favour of Brexit, and all are represented in the House of Commons by Labour MPs, all of whom wished to remain in the EU.

Plaid Cymru campaigned for a Remain vote in the 2016 referendum on the UK's membership of the EU. Plaid Cymru later supported, during the final stages of Brexit process, a second referendum on the matter. Plaid argued that there should be a referendum on Welsh independence after Brexit, so that Wales could apply for EU membership. A June 2020 YouGov/ITV Cymru poll concluded that 25% were in favour of independence and 54% opposed. The same poll found that 22% of respondents wanted no devolution in Wales, and that 25% were for abolition of the Senedd, with 48% opposed to abolition. A follow-up YouGov poll in August 2020 concluded that support for Welsh independence had risen to 32%.

On 17 May 2020, Health Minister Vaughan Gething told ITV Wales it was "possible" that the election might not be allowed to happen, because of the uncertainty of the COVID-19 pandemic. The First Minister Mark Drakeford announced on 29 June 2020 that a group with representatives from all of the main parties would look at the arrangements that might have to be in place for the election if COVID-19 restrictions are still required. It would look at campaigning and voting, gathering "views over the summer so that by September, any changes the group feels would be beneficial can be considered and taken forward". There was no consensus to agree if a delay was needed, but all parties agreed on measures to encourage vulnerable voters and others to consider applying for a postal vote and early applications, greater flexibility around the nomination of candidates, postal and proxy voting, and measures to ensure the safe operation of polling stations and count venues. The Wales Electoral Coordination Board said on 5 January 2021 that counting of Senedd election votes cannot be done overnight because of COVID restrictions. The board said that the count "will require more staff and take longer to perform."

The Welsh Government introduced a bill under emergency legislation, Welsh Elections (Coronavirus) Bill, in January 2021. It gives the Llywydd (presiding officer) the power to delay the election (with the recommendation of date by the First Minister and consent of two-thirds of the Senedd) by up to six months if the Coronavirus pandemic would make the elections unsafe. The bill was passed on the 10 February 2021 with powers also to introduce early voting and more flexibility with proxy voting.

On 9 March 2021 in a joint British Governments statement ministers said that there will be safety measures in place for May's elections. They encouraged voters to take their own pens or pencils and reconfirmed their aim for elections being conducted on the 6 May 2021. In the three-week review on the 12 March 2021 the First Minister said that the threshold for postponing the election hasn't currently been met. Drakeford also said that leafleting (not door knocking) will be able to start from 15 March.

During the pandemic, the Welsh government messaging and laws have been distinct from the UK government's actions in England; this has made the Welsh public more conscious about devolution. The Welsh government only allowed businesses access to the Economic Resilience Fund devolved to them by Westminster if they officially recognised a trade union which could recruit in their workplaces. The Welsh government announced a two-week lockdown to reduce the prevalence of the virus – called a "firebreak" – in line with the other devolved administrations and distinct from the UK government's lockdown in England.

On 11 December 2020, Plaid Cymru announced that they would hold a referendum on Welsh independence within five years if they won a majority. Some observers also believed they would have requested a Welsh independence referendum in exchange for supporting a minority government. Despite being a unionist party, Labour selected three candidates who supported independence.

On 3 February 2021, UKIP leader Neil Hamilton stated that the party would pledge to deliver a referendum on the devolved administrations in Wales, Scotland and Northern Ireland. He later told BBC Radio Wales: "UKIP had its founding principle in getting out of the European Union and now we've done that we can concentrate on reintegrating the United Kingdom... Our slogan in this election is 'scrap the Senedd'."

On 7 March 2021, the Abolish the Welsh Assembly Party announced that it would be running candidates in all constituencies in the election, and also said that it would run candidates on the regional list. On 6 April, BBC News reported that Gareth Bennett would not stand for Abolish, with Bennett coming to a mutual agreement with the party to stand as an independent in Cynon Valley whilst still remaining supportive of the party, a decision which left Mark Reckless as the party's only MS. The same day, it was reported that ten prospective candidates for Abolish had also "dropped out" with leader Richard Suchorzewski claiming it was due to, "Welsh Nationalist abuse and fear of reprisals."

On 16 April, it was reported that of the 70,000 16 and 17-year-olds eligible to vote, less than 9,000 were currently registered in six counties, according to figures collected by the Election Reform Society (ERS). The deadline to register to vote was Monday 19 April 2021. Figures later compiled by the BBC suggested around 46% of eligible people in this age group were registered to vote by the deadline.

== Retiring members ==
The following MSs did not run for re-election:

MS	Constituency/region	First elected	Party	Date announced
Carwyn Jones	Bridgend	1999	Labour	11 May 2018
David Melding	South Wales Central	1999	Conservatives	28 February 2020
Dafydd Elis-Thomas	Dwyfor Meirionnydd	1999	Independent (elected as Plaid Cymru)	12 April 2020
Angela Burns	Carmarthen West and South Pembrokeshire	2007	Conservatives	16 July 2020
Bethan Sayed	South Wales West	2007	Plaid Cymru	28 August 2020
Kirsty Williams	Brecon and Radnorshire	1999	Liberal Democrats	27 October 2020
Suzy Davies	South Wales West	2011	Conservatives	29 January 2021
Ann Jones	Vale of Clwyd	1999	Labour Co-op	29 January 2021

== Parties ==
=== Contesting constituency and regional ballots ===
Labour, Plaid Cymru, Conservatives, Liberal Democrats and Reform UK stood in all 40 constituencies and all five regional ballots. Five other parties contested all five regions and at least one constituency: Abolish the Welsh Assembly (23 constituencies), UKIP (14 constituencies), Gwlad (14 constituencies), Welsh Green Party (13 constituencies) and Propel (11 constituencies). Llais Gwynedd and Socialist Party of Great Britain stood in Dwyfor Meirionnydd and Cardiff Central respectively. Neither party stood in any regional races. Two parties contested some of the regions and at least one constituency: Freedom Alliance (3 regions and 13 constituencies) and No More Lockdowns (two regions and one constituency).

==== Parties with representation in the Senedd prior to the election ====
Name	Leader(s)	2016 result			Seats at dissolution
Name	Leader(s)	Votes (%)		Seats	Seats at dissolution
Name	Leader(s)	Regional	Constituency	Seats	Seats at dissolution
Labour (Note: Includes 13 MSs sponsored by the Co-operative Party, who are designated Labour and Co-operative.)	Mark Drakeford; MS for Cardiff West	31.5%	34.7%	29 / 60	29 / 60
Plaid Cymru	Adam Price; MS for Carmarthen East and Dinefwr	20.8%	20.5%	12 / 60	10 / 60
Conservatives	Andrew RT Davies; MS for South Wales Central	18.8%	21.1%	11 / 60	10 / 60
UKIP Wales	Neil Hamilton; MS for Mid and West Wales (until 6 May 2021)	13.0%	12.5%	7 / 60	1 / 60
Liberal Democrats	Jane Dodds; MS for Mid and West Wales (after 6 May 2021)	6.5%	7.7%	1 / 60	1 / 60
Abolish the Welsh Assembly	Richard Suchorzewski; Not an MS	4.4%	–	0 / 60	1 / 60
Propel	Neil McEvoy; MS for South Wales Central (until 6 May 2021)	–	–	0 / 60	1 / 60

The five remaining seats were occupied by those independent of political parties.

==== Other parties contesting all or some regions and all or some constituencies ====
Name	Leader(s)	2016 result			Outgoing seats
Name	Leader(s)	Votes (%)		Seats	Outgoing seats
Name	Leader(s)	Regional	Constituency	Seats	Outgoing seats
Green	Anthony Slaughter; Not an MS	3.0	2.5	0 / 60	0 / 60
Gwlad	Gwyn Wigley Evans; Not an MS	–	–	Did not exist	0 / 60
Reform UK Wales	Nathan Gill; Not an MS	–	–	Did not exist	0 / 60
Freedom Alliance	Carol Dobson; Not an MS	–	–	Did not exist	0 / 60

=== Contesting regional ballot only ===
Some parties opted to only contest the regional lists. Two parties – Communist Party of Great Britain and TUSC – contested all five electoral regions. The Welsh Christian Party and the Workers Party of Britain both stood in only one region.

Name	Leader(s)	2016 result			Outgoing seats
Name	Leader(s)	Votes (%)		Seats	Outgoing seats
Name	Leader(s)	Regional	Constituency	Seats	Outgoing seats
Welsh Communist Party	Robert David Griffiths; Not an MS	0.2	–	0 / 60	0 / 60
TUSC Wales	Dave Nellist; Not an MS	0.2	–	0 / 60	0 / 60
Welsh Christian	Jeff Green; Not an MS	0.1	–	0 / 60	0 / 60

== Campaign ==
In the midst of the COVID-19 pandemic, campaigning took into account health issues. Restrictions were placed on the ability of campaigners to carry out door-to-door campaigning. Campaign rallies were not possible, which affected the impact of candidates who normally do well at these events.

Mark Drakeford was criticised for publishing a leaflet in the English language, without a bilingual one. Joel Williams, Conservative candidate for Cardiff North, got the name of his own constituency wrong on a campaign leaflet. Dwyfor Meirionydd Conservative candidate, Charlie Evans, had to apologise for a tweet praising Llyn Tryweryn, the lake which was created to provide water for Liverpool, immortalised with the slogan Cofiwch Dryweryn.

After the death of Prince Philip on 9 April 2021, all of the main political parties suspended campaigning as a mark of respect. Labour and Plaid Cymru restarted their campaigns three days later.

=== Election debates ===
2021 Senedd election debates
Date scheduled	Organisers	Moderator(s)	P Present (Note: Denotes a main invitee attending the event.) S Surrogate (Note: Denotes a main invitee not attending the event, sending a surrogate in their place.) NI Not invited A Absent invitee									
Date scheduled	Organisers	Moderator(s)	Labour	Plaid Cymru	Conservatives	Lib Dems	Abolish	Green	UKIP	Reform UK	Audience	Ref.
18 April	ITV	Adrian Masters	P Drakeford	P Price	P Davies	NI	NI	NI	NI	NI	Virtual	
29 April	BBC	Bethan Rhys Roberts	P Drakeford	P Price	P Davies	P Dodds	P Suchorzewski				Virtual	
29 April	BBC	Nick Servini						P Womack	P Hamilton	S Jenkins	Virtual	
3 May	S4C - Pawb a'i Farn	Betsan Powys	S Morgan	P Price	S Dafydd Davies	NI	NI	NI	NI	NI	Virtual	
4 May	Walesonline	Ruth Mosalski	P Drakeford	P Price	P Davies	NI	NI	NI	NI	NI	Virtual	

== Constituency nominations ==
NB: MSs in office (i.e. incumbents) before the election are bolded. Winners are highlighted with party colours.

Constituency	Labour	Plaid Cymru	Conservatives	Liberal Democrats	Abolish	Green	UKIP	Reform UK	Others and independents
Aberavon	**David Rees**	Victoria Griffiths	Liz Hill O'Shea	Helen Clarke	Sarah Allen		Tim Jenkins	Dennis May	Ceri Golding (Gwlad); Scott Jones (IND)
Aberconwy	Dawn McGuinness	Aaron Wynne	**Janet Finch-Saunders**	Rhys Jones				Rachel Bagshaw	Sharon Smith (No More Lockdowns)
Alyn and Deeside	**Jack Sargeant**	Jack Morris	Abigail Mainon	Chris Twells			Felix Aubel	Richard Purviss	Lien Davies (Freedom Alliance)
Arfon	Iwan Wyn Jones	**Siân Gwenllian**	Tony Thomas	Calum Davies				Andrew Haigh	Martin Bristow
Blaenau Gwent	**Alun Davies**	Peredur Owen Griffiths	Edward Dawson	Paula Yates	Richard Taylor			Robert Beavis	Mandy Moore (IND)
Brecon and Radnorshire	Gethin Jones	Grenville Ham	James Evans	William Powell	Claire Mills	Emily Durrant		John Muir	Sam Holwill (Gwlad) Karen Laurie-Parry (IND)
Bridgend	Sarah Murphy	Leanne Lewis	Rachel Nugent-Finn	Harvey Jones				Christine Roach	Steven Bletsoe (IND); **Caroline Jones** (IND); Geraint Jones (Gwlad)
Caerphilly	**Hefin David**	**Delyth Jewell** (Note: Incumbent for the list seat)	Steven Mayfield	Steve Aicheler	Steve Jones			Tim Price	
Cardiff Central	**Jenny Rathbone**	Wiliam Rees	Calum Davies	Rodney Berman	Munawar Mughal	Ceri Davies		Julian Bosley	Clem Thomas (Gwlad) Brian Johnson (Socialist Party of Great Britain) Thomas Franklin (Freedom Alliance)
Cardiff North	**Julie Morgan**	Fflur Elin	Joel Williams	Rhys Taylor	Lawrence Gwynn	Debra Cooper		Haydn Rushworth	Akil Kata (Propel); Virginia Kemp (Freedom Alliance)
Cardiff South and Penarth	**Vaughan Gething**	Nasir Adam	Leighton Rowlands	Alex Wilson	Lisa Peregrine	Helen Westhead	Paul Campbell	Alan Pick	Angus Hawkins (Gwlad) Alan Golding (Freedom Alliance) Matt Friend (Propel) David Rolfe (IND)
Cardiff West	**Mark Drakeford**	Rhys ab Owen	Sean Driscoll	Heath Marshall	Lee Canning	David Griffin		Nick Mullins	**Neil McEvoy** (Propel); Captain Beany (IND)
Carmarthen East and Dinefwr	Rob James	**Adam Price**	Havard Hughes	Monica M French				Karl Pollard	
Carmarthen West and South Pembrokeshire	Riaz Hassan	Cefin Campbell	Samuel Kurtz	Alistair Cameron			Paul Dowson	Peter Prosser	Jon Harvey (IND)
Ceredigion	Dylan Lewis-Rowlands	**Elin Jones**	Amanda Jenner	Cadan ap Tomos		Harry Hayfield		Gethin James	Stephanie Evans (Freedom Alliance)
Clwyd South	**Ken Skates**	**Llyr Gruffydd**	Barbara Hughes	Leena Farhat	Jonathon Harrington		Jeanette Barton	**Mandy Jones**	
Clwyd West	Joshua Hurst	Elin Walker Jones	**Darren Millar**	David Wilkins	Euan Mcgivern		Jeanie Barton	Clare Eno	Rhydian Hughes (Gwlad)
Cynon Valley	**Vikki Howells**	Geraint Benney	Mia Rees	Gerald Francis	Martyn Ford			Peter Hopkins	**Gareth Bennett** (IND); Vicky Jenkins (Propel)
Delyn	**Hannah Blythyn**	Paul Rowlinson	**Mark Isherwood**	Andrew Parkhurst			Mary Davies	Aiden Down	Anthony Williams (Gwlad)
Dwyfor Meirionnydd	Cian Ireland	Mabon ap Gwynfor	Charlie Evans	Stephen Churchman				Louise Hughes	Glyn Daniels (Llais Gwynedd); Michelle Murray (Freedom Alliance); Peter Read (Propel)
Gower	**Rebecca Evans**	John Davies	Myles Langstone	Michael Sheehan		Anna Pigott		Byron John	David Erasmus (Gwlad)
Islwyn	**Rhianon Passmore**	Rhys Mills	Gavin Chambers	Oliver Townsend	Mike Ford		**Neil Hamilton**	James Wells	Kevin Etheridge (IND)
Llanelli	**Lee Waters**	**Helen Mary Jones**	Stefan Ryszewski	Jon Burree			Howard Lillyman	Gareth Beer	Sian Caiach (Gwlad) Shahana Najmi (IND)
Merthyr Tydfil and Rhymney	**Dawn Bowden**	Ian Gwynne	Donna Gavin	Jez Becker	Hugh Moelwyn Hughes		George Pykov	Colin Jones	
Monmouth	Catrin Maby	Hugh Kocan	Peter Fox	Jo Watkins	**Mark Reckless**	Ian Chandler		Susan Boucher	Laurence Williams (Gwlad); **Nick Ramsay** (IND); Elspeth Hill (Freedom Alliance)
Montgomeryshire	Kait Duerden	Elwyn Vaughan	**Russell George**	Alison Alexander				Oliver Lewis	Gwyn Evans (Gwlad)
Neath	**Jeremy Miles**	Sioned Williams	Mathew Williams	Iain Clamp	Simon Rees	Megan Poppy Lloyd		Andrew Pryer	James Henton (Propel)
Newport East	**John Griffiths**	Daniel Llewellyn	Gareth Rhys Hughes	Mike Hamilton	Rob Steed		Ben Walker	**David Rowlands**	Sonya Cary (Freedom Alliance)
Newport West	**Jayne Bryant**	Jonathan Clark	Michael Enea	John Miller		Amelia Womack		Kevin Boucher	Steve Marsh (Freedom Alliance)
Ogmore	**Huw Irranca-Davies**	Luke Fletcher	Nathan Adams	Cameron Shippam	Robin Hunter-Clarke			Glenda Davies	Tim Thomas (Propel)
Pontypridd	**Mick Antoniw**	Heledd Fychan	Joel James	Steven Rajam	Mike Hughes	Ken Barker		Jamie Jenkins	Wanye Owen (IND)
Preseli Pembrokeshire	Jackie Jones	Cris Tomos	**Paul Davies**	Tina Roberts				William Dennison	
Rhondda	Buffy Williams	**Leanne Wood**	Thomas Parkhilll	Jackie Charlton	Ian McLean			Steve Bayliss	Jeff Gregory (Propel); Stephen Phillips (Freedom Alliance)
Swansea East	**Mike Hedges**	Rhiannon Barrar	Cameron Brennan	Sam Bennett	Cameron Edwards		Dan Morgan	Darren Rees	
Swansea West	**Julie James**	**Dai Lloyd**	Samantha Chohan	Chloe Hutchinson	James Cole	Chris Evans		Bernard Holton	Michelle Valerio (Freedom Alliance) Katon Bouzalakos (Propel)
Torfaen	**Lynne Neagle**	Lyn Ackerman	Gruff Parry	Veronica German			Tom Harrison	Ian Williams	Ryan Williams (Gwlad) Matthew Ross-Francome (Freedom Alliance)
Vale of Clwyd	Jason McLellan	Glenn Swingler	Gareth Davies	Lisa Davies				Peter Dain	David Thomas (IND)
Vale of Glamorgan	**Jane Hutt**	Richard Grigg	Matt Smith	Sally Stephenson	Stuart Field	Anthony Slaughter		Michael Hancock	Karl-James Langford (Gwlad) Alan Coulthard (IND) Neill Shah (Freedom Alliance) Janet Brocklehurst (Propel)
Wrexham	**Lesley Griffiths**	Carrie Harper	Jeremy Kent	Tim Sly	Paul Ashton		Sebastian Ross	Charles Dodman	Aaron Norton (Gwlad)
Ynys Môn	Samantha Egelstaff	**Rhun ap Iorwerth**	Lyn Hudson	Chris Jones				Emmett Jenner	

== Regional nominations ==
NB: MSs in office (i.e. incumbents) before the election are bolded.

According to the National Assembly for Wales (Representation of the People) Order 1999, "party lists" may include from one to twelve candidates. They are elected "in the order that they are included on that list (starting with the highest)".

The list below only shows the first ranks. Elected candidates are highlighted with party colours.

Region	Order	Labour	Plaid Cymru	Conservatives	Abolish	UKIP	Reform UK Wales	Liberal Democrats	Green	Others and independents
Mid and West Wales	1	**Eluned Morgan**	Cefin Campbell	Tomos Davies	Claire Mills	Jonathon Riley	Gethin James	Jane Dodds	Emily Durrant	Siân Mair Caiach (Gwlad)
Mid and West Wales	2	**Joyce Watson**	**Helen Mary Jones**	Amanda Jenner	Ray Wood	Howard Lilyman	Roger Lewis	William Powell	Tomos Barlow	Gwyn Wigley Evans (Gwlad)
Mid and West Wales	3	Helen Taylor	Elwyn Vaughan	Liz Lesnianski	Jeremy Pugh	Paul Dowson	Louise Hughes	Alistair Cameron	Harry Hayfield	Dennis Morris (Gwlad)
Mid and West Wales	4	Ben Gwalchmai	Cris Tomos	Aled Davies	Benjamin Pugh	Ken Rees	Peter Prosser	Stephen Churchman	Marc Pearton-Scale	Samuel Holwill (Gwlad)
North Wales	1	Carolyn Thomas	**Llyr Gruffydd**	**Mark Isherwood**	Richard Suchorzewski	Dr Felix Aubel	Nathan Gill	Chris Twells	Iolo Jones	**Michelle Brown** (IND) Phil Roberts (Gwlad)
North Wales	2	Andy Short	Carrie Harper	Sam Rowlands	Jonathon Harrington	Jeanie Barton	Peter Dain	David Wilkins	Duncan Rees	Aled Gwyn Job (Gwlad)
North Wales	3	Diane Green	Elin Walker Jones	Barbara Hughes	William Ashton	Mary Davies	Clare Eno	Tim Sly	Adam Turner	Rhydian Hughes (Gwlad)
North Wales	4	Ryan O’Gorman	Paul Rowlinson	Gareth Davies	Craig Search	Jeanette Bassford-Barton	Charles Dodman	Calum Davies	Linda Rogers	Aaron Norton (Gwlad)
North Wales	5		Catrin Wagner	Abigail Mainon	Euan McGivern	Sebastian Ross	Emmett Jenner	Andrew Parkhurst		Anthony Williams (Gwlad)
South Wales Central	1	Ruba Sivagnanam	Rhys ab Owen	**Andrew RT Davies**	Lee Canning	Paul Campbell	Jamie Jenkins	Rodney Berman	Anthony Slaughter	Karl-James Langford (Gwlad)
South Wales Central	2	Dan De'Ath	Heledd Fychan	Joel James	Martyn Ford	Benjamin Dale	Peter Hopkins	Rhys Taylor	Helen Westhead	Clem Thomas (Gwlad)
South Wales Central	3	Maliika Kaaba	Fflur Elin	Calum Davies	Munawar Ahmed Mughal	Clive Easton	Steve Bayliss	Sally Stephenson	David Griffin	Angus Hawkins (Gwlad)
South Wales Central	4	Owain Williams	Sahar Al-Faifi	Adrian Robson	Lisa Peregrine	Paul Williams	Mike Hancock	Steven Rajam	Debra Cooper	Rosamund Ellis-Evans (Gwlad)
South Wales East	1	Helen Cunningham	**Delyth Jewell**	**Laura Anne Jones**	**Mark Reckless**	**Neil Hamilton**	James Wells	Jo Watkins	Amelia Womack	Rob Griffiths (Communist Party) Calen Jones (Gwlad)
South Wales East	2	Peter Jones	Peredur Owen Griffiths	Natasha Asghar	Richard Taylor	Ben Walker	Kirsty Walmsley	Veronica German	Ian Chandler	Bob Davenport (Communist Party) Laurence Williams (Gwlad)
South Wales East	3	Mary Ann Brocklesby	Lindsay Whittle	Matthew Evans	Steve Jones	Tom Harrison	**David Rowlands**	Oliver Townsend	Lauren James	Glenn Stephen Eynon (Communist Party) Ryan Thomas Williams (Gwlad)
South Wales East	4	Majid Rahman	Rhys Mills	Nick Evans	Mike Ford	Rob James	Colin Jones	Jez Becker	Stephen Priestnall	Irene Green (Communist Party) Terry Beverton (Gwlad)
South Wales West	1	Sian James	Sioned Williams	Tom Giffard	Simon Rees	Tim Jenkins	Christine Roach	Chloe Hutchinson	Megan Poppy Lloyd	Geraint David Jones (Gwlad)
South Wales West	2	Kevin Pascoe	Luke Fletcher	Altaf Hussain	Cameron Edwards	Dan Morgan	Glenda Davies	Sam Bennett	Chris Evans	Wayne Erasmus (Gwlad)
South Wales West	3	Neelo Farr	John Davies	Samantha Chohan	Robin Hunter-Clarke	Stan Robinson	Byron John	Harvey Jones	Alex Harris	David Smith (Gwlad)
South Wales West	4	Mahaboob Basha	Jamie Evans	Liz Hill O'Shea	Sarah Allen	Gillian Mason	Sean Prior	Helen Ceri Clarke	Tom Muller	John Young (Gwlad)

== Opinion polling ==
The constituency vote is shown in lighter lines, while the regional vote is shown in darker lines.

Graph of the evolution of the opinion polls for the 2021 Welsh Parliament election (the right border represents the last possible day for the election to be held). Lines represent local regressions (LOESS) with a span of 0.5.

== Target seats ==
Below are listed all the constituencies which require a swing of less than 10% from the 2016 result to change hands.

=== Labour targets ===
Rank	Constituency	Winning party 2016	Majority 2016	Swing to gain (%)	Labour's place 2016	Labour's place 2021	Result
1	Aberconwy	Conservative	1,607	3.35	3rd	3rd	Conservative hold
2	Carmarthen West and South Pembrokeshire	Conservative	3,373	5.75	2nd	2nd	Conservative hold
3	Preseli Pembrokeshire	Conservative	3,930	6.8	2nd	2nd	Conservative hold
4	Rhondda	Plaid Cymru	3,459	7.35	2nd	1st	Labour gain
5	Monmouth	Conservative	5,147	8.2	2nd	2nd	Conservative hold

=== Plaid Cymru targets ===
Rank	Constituency	Winning party 2016	Majority 2016	Swing to gain (%)	Plaid Cymru's place 2016	Plaid Cymru's place 2021	Result
1	Llanelli	Labour	382	0.65	2nd	2nd	Labour hold
2	Blaenau Gwent	Labour	650	1.55	2nd	2nd	Labour hold
3	Aberconwy	Conservative	754	1.7	2nd	2nd	Conservative hold
4	Cardiff West	Labour	1,176	1.85	2nd	3rd	Labour hold
5	Caerphilly	Labour	1,575	2.9	2nd	2nd	Labour hold
6	Neath	Labour	2,923	5.75	2nd	2nd	Labour hold

=== Conservative targets ===
Rank	Constituency	Winning party 2016	Majority 2016	Swing to gain (%)	Conservatives' place 2016	Conservatives' place 2021	Result
1	Vale of Glamorgan	Labour	777	1.05	2nd	2nd	Labour hold
2	Vale of Clwyd	Labour	768	1.55	2nd	1st	Conservative gain
3	Gower	Labour	1,829	3.05	2nd	2nd	Labour hold
4	Wrexham	Labour	1,325	3.25	2nd	2nd	Labour hold
5	Cardiff North	Labour	3,667	4.9	2nd	2nd	Labour hold
6	Clwyd South	Labour	3,016	6.8	2nd	2nd	Labour hold
7	Delyn	Labour	3,582	7.7	2nd	2nd	Labour hold

=== Liberal Democrat targets ===
Rank	Constituency	Winning party 2016	Majority 2016	Swing to gain (%)	Lib Dems' place 2016	Lib Dems' place 2021	Result
1	Cardiff Central	Labour	817	1.55	2nd	2nd	Labour hold
2	Ceredigion	Plaid Cymru	2,408	4.1	2nd	4th	Plaid Cymru hold
3	Montgomeryshire	Conservative	3,339	7.05	2nd	3rd	Conservative hold

== Results ==
=== Overall ===
Party	Constituency			Regional			Total seats	+/–
Party	Votes	%	Seats	Votes	%	Seats	Total seats	+/–
Labour (Note: Includes 16 MSs sponsored by the Co-operative Party, who are designated Labour and Co-operative.)	443,047	39.85	27	401,770	36.17	3	30	+1
Conservative	289,802	26.07	8	278,560	25.08	8	16	+5
Plaid Cymru	225,376	20.27	5	230,161	20.72	8	13	+1
Liberal Democrats	54,202	4.88	0	48,217	4.34	1	1	0
Abolish the Welsh Assembly	18,149	1.63	0	41,399	3.73	0	0	0
Green	17,817	1.60	0	48,714	4.39	0	0	0
Reform UK	17,405	1.57	0	11,730	1.06	0	0	New
UKIP	8,586	0.77	0	17,341	1.56	0	0	–7
Propel	8,864	0.80	0	9,825	0.88	0	0	New
Gwlad	2,829	0.25	0	6,776	0.61	0	0	New
Freedom Alliance	3,148	0.28	0	3,638	0.33	0	0	New
Communist Party of Britain				2,837	0.26	0	0	0
No More Lockdowns	223	0.02	0	2,794	0.25	0	0	New
TUSC				1,647	0.15	0	0	0
Christian				1,366	0.12	0	0	0
Workers Party of Britain				411	0.04	0	0	New
Llais Gwynedd	1,136	0.10	0				0	0
Socialist Party of Great Britain	82	0.01	0				0	0
Independents	21,064	1.89	0	3,709	0.33	0	0	0
Total	1,111,730	100.00	40	1,110,895	100.00	20	60	0
Valid votes	1,111,730	99.43		1,110,895	99.33			
Invalid/blank votes	6,354	0.57		7,493	0.67			
Total votes	1,118,084	100.00		1,118,388	100.00			
Registered voters/turnout	2,389,879	46.78		2,388,860	46.82			
Source: Senedd Cymru, South Wales West, Swansea West

=== Constituency and regional summary ===
==== Mid and West Wales ====
2021 Senedd election: Mid and West Wales regional list
Party	Elected candidates	Seats	+/−	Votes	%	+/−%
Plaid Cymru	Cefin Campbell	1	Steady	65,450	27.5	▲1.2
Labour	Eluned Morgan; Joyce Watson	2	Steady	61,733	25.9	▲6.5
Liberal Democrats	Jane Dodds	1	▲1	16,181	6.8	▼4.1

2021 Senedd election: Mid and West Wales constituencies
Constituency	Elected member	Result
Brecon and Radnorshire	James Evans	Conservative gain from Liberal Democrat
Carmarthen East and Dinefwr	Adam Price	Plaid Cymru hold
Carmarthen West and South Pembrokeshire	Samuel Kurtz	Conservative hold
Ceredigion	Elin Jones	Plaid Cymru hold
Dwyfor Meirionnydd	Mabon ap Gwynfor	Plaid Cymru hold
Llanelli	Lee Waters	Labour Co-op hold
Montgomeryshire	Russell George	Conservative hold
Preseli Pembrokeshire	Paul Davies	Conservative hold

==== North Wales ====
2021 Senedd election: North Wales regional list
Party	Elected candidates	Seats	+/−	Votes	%	+/−%
Labour	Carolyn Thomas	1	▲1	73,120	32.3	▲4.2
Conservative	Mark Isherwood; Sam Rowlands	2	▲1	67,544	29.9	▲7.7
Plaid Cymru	Llyr Gruffydd	1	1	53,950	23.9	▲0.6

2021 Senedd election: North Wales constituencies
Constituency	Elected member	Result
Aberconwy	Janet Finch-Saunders	Conservative hold
Alyn and Deeside	Jack Sargeant	Labour hold
Arfon	Siân Gwenllian	Plaid Cymru hold
Clwyd South	Ken Skates	Labour hold
Clwyd West	Darren Millar	Conservative hold
Delyn	Hannah Blythyn	Labour Co-op hold
Vale of Clwyd	Gareth Davies	Conservative gain from Labour
Wrexham	Lesley Griffiths	Labour hold
Ynys Môn	Rhun ap Iorwerth	Plaid Cymru hold

==== South Wales Central ====
2021 Senedd election: South Wales Central regional list
Party	Elected candidates	Seats	+/−	Votes	%	+/−%
Conservative	Andrew RT Davies; Joel James	2	Steady	56,662	22.1	▲3.8
Plaid Cymru	Rhys ab Owen; Heledd Fychan	2	▲2	46,478	18.2	▼2.7

2021 Senedd election: South Wales Central constituencies
Constituency	Elected member	Result
Cardiff Central	Jenny Rathbone	Labour hold
Cardiff North	Julie Morgan	Labour hold
Cardiff South and Penarth	Vaughan Gething	Labour Co-op hold
Cardiff West	Mark Drakeford	Labour hold
Cynon Valley	Vikki Howells	Labour Co-op hold
Pontypridd	Mick Antoniw	Labour Co-op hold
Rhondda	Buffy Williams	Labour gain from Plaid Cymru
Vale of Glamorgan	Jane Hutt	Labour hold

==== South Wales East ====
2021 Senedd election: South Wales East regional list
Party	Elected candidates	Seats	+/−	Votes	%	+/−%
Conservative	Laura Anne Jones; Natasha Asghar	2	▲1	52,323	25.2	▲8.0
Plaid Cymru	Peredur Owen Griffiths; Delyth Jewell	2	▲1	30,530	14.7	▼0.6

2021 Senedd election: South Wales East constituencies
Constituency	Elected member	Result
Blaenau Gwent	Alun Davies	Labour Co-op hold
Caerphilly	Hefin David	Labour hold
Islwyn	Rhianon Passmore	Labour Co-op hold
Merthyr Tydfil and Rhymney	Dawn Bowden	Labour hold
Monmouth	Peter Fox	Conservative hold
Newport East	John Griffiths	Labour Co-op hold
Newport West	Jayne Bryant	Labour hold
Torfaen	Lynne Neagle	Labour Co-op hold

==== South Wales West ====
2021 Senedd election: South Wales West regional list
Party	Elected candidates	Seats	+/−	Votes	%	+/−%
Conservative	Tom Giffard; Altaf Hussain	2	▲1	38,244	20.9	▲5.9
Plaid Cymru	Sioned Williams; Luke Fletcher	2	Steady	33,753	18.5	▲1.3

2021 Senedd election: South Wales West constituencies
Constituency	Elected member	Result
Aberavon	David Rees	Labour hold
Bridgend	Sarah Murphy	Labour Co-op hold
Gower	Rebecca Evans	Labour Co-op hold
Neath	Jeremy Miles	Labour Co-op hold
Ogmore	Huw Irranca-Davies	Labour Co-op hold
Swansea East	Mike Hedges	Labour Co-op hold
Swansea West	Julie James	Labour hold

== Turnout ==
This election saw the second highest turnout for a Senedd election, with 46.6% of eligible Welsh voters casting their ballot. The previous high was 46.3% in 1999. There were, however, also noticeable differences in turnout in certain constituencies, with 52% of registered voters voting in Dwyfor Meirionnydd and just 35% doing so in Merthyr Tydfil and Rhymney.

Dr Jac Larner, a politics lecturer at Cardiff University and an investigator for the Welsh election survey, said that the two largest factors in determining voter turnout between constituencies were their socio-economic make-up and the competitiveness of the seat. "Basically, people with higher levels of formal education, people who own houses, people with more wealth essentially, are more likely to turn up to vote," he told BBC News. "Straight away, as you compare Cardiff North to Merthyr Tydfil, you see big differences there. However, we also know there's a pretty strong relationship between how competitive a constituency is and turnout. That's not just in Wales, that's a general rule almost everywhere in the world - and Merthyr Tydfil, as we've seen in this election, is not competitive in any sense."

Writing in Tribune magazine, Labour MS Mick Antoniw said that Welsh Labour's victory was "linked to the successful way in which Mark Drakeford and his government have handled the Covid pandemic and the way he has stood up to the more bizarre and reckless decisions of Boris Johnson, always putting the safety of the Welsh people and Welsh interests first."

== Donations ==
Party	Donations
Conservative	£549,132
Labour	£500,566
Plaid Cymru	£302,201
Liberal Democrats	£184,434
Reform	£79,631
Green	£58,554
UKIP	£54,276
Abolish	£24,495
Propel	£20,382
Communist	£9,073
Freedom Alliance	£8,426
Gwlad	£5,298

== See also ==
Other elections in the UK which were held on the same day:

- 2021 London Assembly election
- 2021 London mayoral election
- 2021 Scottish Parliament election
- 2021 United Kingdom local elections
