= Carmarthen West and South Pembrokeshire =

Carmarthen West and South Pembrokeshire may refer to:

- Carmarthen West and South Pembrokeshire (UK Parliament constituency)
- Carmarthen West and South Pembrokeshire (Senedd constituency)
