= Mid and West Wales (Senedd electoral region) =

Senedd electoral region (1999–2026)

- Canolbarth a Gorllewin Cymru (Welsh)
- Former Multi-member electoral region for the Senedd
- Map of Mid and West Wales, with constituencies numbered alphabetically. Inset within Wales shown to the left with the four regional seats.
Interactive map
Interactive map of the constituency
- Preserved counties: Dyfed; Gwynedd (part); Powys

Former Multi-member electoral region
- Created: 1999 (amended in 2007)
- Abolished: 2026
- Number of members: 12; 8 constituency; 4 regional
- MSs (last elected in 2021): Plaid Cymru (4); Conservative (4); Labour (3); Liberal Democrats (1)
- Constituencies: 1. Brecon and Radnorshire; 2. Carmarthen East and Dinefwr; 3. Carmarthen West and South Pembrokeshire; 4. Ceredigion; 5. Dwyfor Meirionnydd (since 2007); 6. Llanelli; 7. Montgomeryshire; 8. Preseli Pembrokeshire
- Former constituencies (1999–2007): Meirionnydd Nant Conwy

Mid and West Wales (Welsh: Canolbarth a Gorllewin Cymru) was an electoral region of the Senedd, consisting of eight constituencies. The region elected twelve members, eight directly elected constituency members and four additional members. The electoral region was first used in the 1999 Welsh Assembly election, when the National Assembly for Wales was created.

Each constituency elected one Member of the Senedd by the first past the post electoral system, and the region as a whole elected four additional or top-up Members of the Senedd, to create a degree of proportional representation. The additional member seats were allocated from closed lists by the D'Hondt method, with constituency results being taken into account in the allocation.

== County and Westminster boundaries ==
Map of the boundaries prior to abolition

As created in 1999, the region covered the whole of the preserved county of Dyfed, most of the preserved county of Powys and parts of the preserved counties of Clwyd and Gwynedd. Other parts of Powys, Clwyd and Gwynedd were within the North Wales electoral region.

However, boundaries changed for the 2007 Welsh Assembly election and the region later covered all of the preserved county of Dyfed, all of the preserved county of Powys and part of the preserved county of Gwynedd. The rest of Gwynedd was in the North Wales region.

The constituencies had the names and boundaries of constituencies of the House of Commons of the Parliament of the United Kingdom (Westminster). For Westminster election purposes, however, there are no electoral regions, and constituency boundary changes became effective for the 2010 United Kingdom general election.

== Electoral region profile ==
The region was geographically the largest of the five electoral regions in Wales, being larger in area than the other four regions combined. It consisted almost entirely of sparsely populated rural areas, with the exception of the tinplate- and steel-producing town of Llanelli in the south. The Welsh language was widely spoken across its area.

== Constituencies ==
Constituency	2021 result	Preserved county
Brecon and Radnorshire	James Evans; Conservative	Entirely within Powys
Carmarthen East and Dinefwr	Adam Price; Plaid Cymru	Entirely within Dyfed
Carmarthen West and South Pembrokeshire	Samuel Kurtz; Conservative	Entirely within Dyfed
Ceredigion	Elin Jones; Plaid Cymru	Entirely within Dyfed
Dwyfor Meirionnydd	Mabon ap Gwynfor; Plaid Cymru	Entirely within Gwynedd
Llanelli	Lee Waters; Labour	Entirely within Dyfed
Montgomeryshire	Russell George; Conservative	Entirely within Powys
Preseli Pembrokeshire	Paul Davies; Conservative	Entirely within Dyfed

== Former constituencies ==
=== 1999 to 2007 ===
Map of former boundaries 1999-2007

Constituency	Preserved counties
1. Brecon and Radnorshire	Entirely within Powys
2. Carmarthen East and Dinefwr	Entirely within Dyfed
3. Carmarthen West and South Pembrokeshire	Entirely within Dyfed
4. Ceredigion	Entirely within Dyfed
5. Llanelli	Entirely within Dyfed
6. Meirionnydd Nant Conwy	Partly Clwyd, partly Gwynedd
7. Montgomeryshire	Entirely within Powys
8. Preseli Pembrokeshire	Entirely within Dyfed

== Assembly members and Members of the Senedd ==
=== Constituency MSs ===
Term	Election	Brecon and Radnorshire	Carmarthen East and Dinefwr	Carmarthen West and South Pembrokeshire	Ceredigion	Meirionnydd Nant Conwy	Llanelli	Montgomeryshire	Preseli Pembrokeshire
1st	1999	Kirsty Williams (LD)	Rhodri Glyn Thomas (PC)	Christine Gwyther (Lab)	Elin Jones (PC)	Dafydd Elis-Thomas (PC)	Helen Mary Jones (PC)	Mick Bates (LD)	Richard Edwards (Lab)
2nd	2003	Kirsty Williams (LD)	Rhodri Glyn Thomas (PC)	Christine Gwyther (Lab)	Elin Jones (PC)	Dafydd Elis-Thomas (PC)	Catherine Thomas (Lab)	Mick Bates (LD)	Tamsin Dunwoody (Lab)
Term	Election	Brecon and Radnorshire	Carmarthen East and Dinefwr	Carmarthen West and South Pembrokeshire	Ceredigion	Dwyfor Meirionnydd	Llanelli	Montgomeryshire	Preseli Pembrokeshire
3rd	2007	Kirsty Williams (LD)	Rhodri Glyn Thomas (PC)	Angela Burns (Con)	Elin Jones (PC)	Dafydd Elis-Thomas (PC) (later Independent)	Helen Mary Jones (PC)	Mick Bates (LD)	Paul Davies (Con)
4th	2011	Kirsty Williams (LD)	Rhodri Glyn Thomas (PC)	Angela Burns (Con)	Elin Jones (PC)	Dafydd Elis-Thomas (PC) (later Independent)	Keith Davies (Lab)	Russell George (Con)	Paul Davies (Con)
5th	2016	Kirsty Williams (LD)	Adam Price (PC)	Angela Burns (Con)	Elin Jones (PC)	Dafydd Elis-Thomas (PC) (later Independent)	Lee Waters (Lab)	Russell George (Con)	Paul Davies (Con)
5th	2016	Kirsty Williams (LD)	Adam Price (PC)	Angela Burns (Con)	Elin Jones (PC)	Dafydd Elis-Thomas (PC) (later Independent)	Lee Waters (Lab)	Russell George (Con)	Paul Davies (Con)
6th	2021	James Evans (Con)	Adam Price (PC)	Samuel Kurtz (Con)	Elin Jones (PC)	Mabon ap Gwynfor (PC)	Lee Waters (Lab)	Russell George (Con)	Paul Davies (Con)

=== Regional list MSs ===
N.B. This table is for presentation purposes only

Term	Election	AM	AM	AM	AM
1st	1999	Nick Bourne (Con)	Glyn Davies (Con)	Alun Michael (Lab)	Cynog Dafis (PC)
1st	2000	Nick Bourne (Con)	Glyn Davies (Con)	Delyth Evans (Lab)	Cynog Dafis (PC)
2nd	2003	Nick Bourne (Con)	Glyn Davies (Con)	Lisa Francis (Con)	Helen Mary Jones (PC)
3rd	2007	Nick Bourne (Con)	Alun Davies (Lab)	Joyce Watson (Lab)	Nerys Evans (PC)
4th	2011	William Powell (LD)	Rebecca Evans (Lab)	Joyce Watson (Lab)	Simon Thomas (PC)
5th	2016	Neil Hamilton (UKIP)	Eluned Morgan (Lab)	Joyce Watson (Lab)	Simon Thomas (PC)
5th	2018	Neil Hamilton (UKIP)	Eluned Morgan (Lab)	Joyce Watson (Lab)	Helen Mary Jones (PC)
6th	2021	Jane Dodds (LD)	Eluned Morgan (Lab)	Joyce Watson (Lab)	Cefin Campbell (PC)

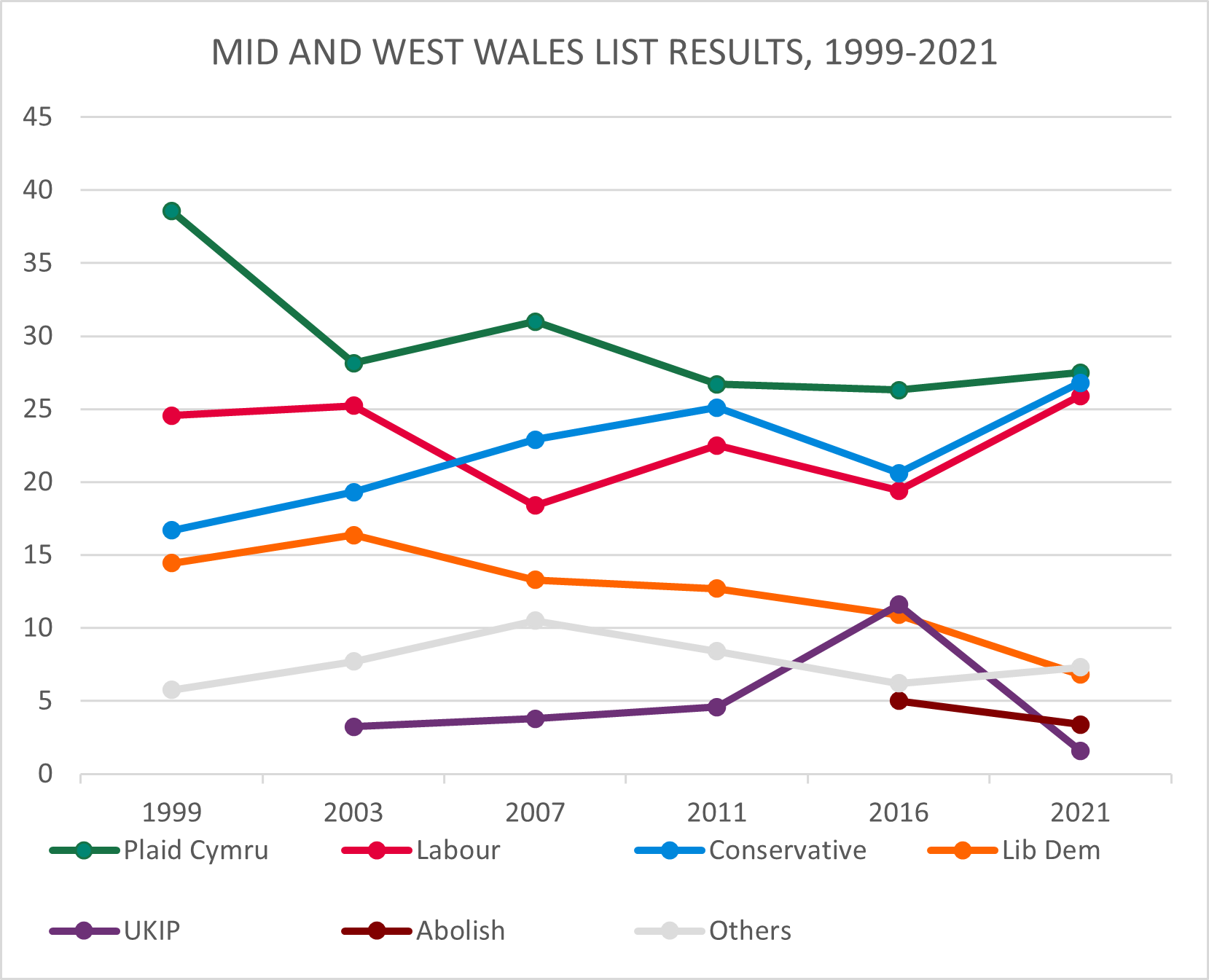
Election results since 1999 (parties who never got >5% counted as others)

== 2021 Senedd election ==
2021 Senedd election: Mid and West Wales
List	Candidates	Votes	Of total (%)	± from prev.
Plaid Cymru	Cefin Campbell, Helen Mary Jones, Elwyn Vaughan, Cris Tomos, Grenville Ham, Elin Tracy Jones, Angharad Shaw, Mabon ap Gwynfor, Elin Jones, Adam Price	65,460	27.5	▲1.2
Conservative	Tomos Davies, Amanda Jenner, Elizabeth Lesnianski, Aled Davies, Charles Evans, Rachel Buckler, Brian Murphy	63,827	26.8	▲6.2
Labour	Eluned Morgan, Joyce Watson, Helen Taylor, Ben Gwalchmai	61,733	25.9	▲6.5
Liberal Democrats	Jane Dodds, William Powell, Alistair Cameron, Stephen Churchman, Cadan ap Tomos, Alison Alexander	16,181	6.8	▼4.1
Green	Emily Durrant, Tomos Barlow, Peter (Harry) Hayfield, Marc Pearton-Scale	10,545	4.4	▲0.6
Abolish	Claire Mills, Ray Wood, Jeremy Pugh, Benjamin Pugh, Bryan Craven, Sara Canning	8,073	3.4	▼1.6
UKIP	Jonathon Riley, Howard Lillyman, Paul Dowson, Kenneth Rees	3,731	1.6	▼10.0
Reform	Gethin James, Roger Lewis, Louise Hughes, Peter Prosser, Gareth Beer	2,582	1.1	▲1.1
Propel	Dylan Bullard, Gretta Marshall, Peter Read, Sara Thomas	1,428	0.6	▲0.6
Christian	Jeffrey Green, Barbara Hill, Louise Wynne Jones, Sue Green	1,366	0.6	▲0.1
Gwlad	Siân Caiach, Gwyn Wigley Evans, Dennis Morris, Samuel Holwill	1,303	0.5	▲0.5
Freedom Alliance	Michelle Murray, Jason Smith, Darryl Bickler	1,181	0.5	▲0.5
Communist	Claudia Cannon, Catrin Ashton, Graham Morgan, David Wood	589	0.2	0.0
TUSC	Carys Phillips	257	0.1	▲0.1

=== 2021 Senedd election additional members ===
Party	Constituency seats	List votes (vote %)	D'Hondt entitlement	Additional Members elected	Total Members elected	Deviation from D'Hondt entitlement
Plaid Cymru	3	65,460 (27.5%)	4	1	4	0
Conservative	4	63,827 (26.8%)	4	0	4	0
Labour	1	61,733 (25.9%)	3	2	3	0
Liberal Democrats	0	16,181 (6.8%)	1	1	1	0
Green	0	10,545 (4.4%)	0	0	0	0
Abolish	0	8,073 (3.4%)	0	0	0	0
UKIP	0	3,731 (1.6%)	0	0	0	0
Reform	0	2,582 (0.5%)	0	0	0	0
Propel	0	1,428 (0.5%)	0	0	0	0
Welsh Christian	0	1,366 (0.6%)	0	0	0	0
Gwlad	0	1,303 (0.5%)	0	0	0	0
Freedom Alliance	0	1,181 (0.5%)	0	0	0	0
Communist	0	589 (0.2%)	0	0	0	0
TUSC	0	257 (0.1%)	0	0	0	0

=== Regional MSs elected 2021 ===
Party	Name
Labour	Eluned Morgan
Labour	Joyce Watson
Plaid Cymru	Cefin Campbell
Liberal Democrats	Jane Dodds

=== D'Hondt count ===
Seat #	Party	Votes					Member
Seat #	Party	Count 1	Count 2	Count 3	Count 4	Count 5	Member
–	Plaid Cymru	65460					Constituency seat 1
–	Conservative	63827					Constituency seat 1
–	Labour	61733					Constituency seat 1
–	Plaid Cymru		32730				Constituency seat 2
–	Conservative		31914				Constituency seat 2
1	Labour		30866				Eluned Morgan
–	Plaid Cymru			21820			Constituency seat 3
–	Conservative			21276			Constituency seat 3
2	Labour			20578			Joyce Watson
3	Plaid Cymru				16365		Cefin Campbell
4	Liberal Democrats	16181					Jane Dodds
–	Conservative				15957		Constituency seat 4
5	Labour				15433		Helen Taylor
6	Plaid Cymru					13092	Helen Mary Jones
7	Conservative					12765	Tomos Davies
8	Labour					12347	Ben Gwalchmai

== 2016 Welsh Assembly election additional members ==
Party	Constituency seats	List votes (vote %)	D'Hondt entitlement	Additional Members elected	Total Members elected	Deviation from D'Hondt entitlement
Plaid Cymru	3	56,754 (26.3%)	4	1	4	0
Conservative	3	44,461 (20.6%)	3	0	3	0
Labour	1	41,975 (19.4%)	3	2	3	0
UKIP	0	25,042 (11.6%)	1	1	1	0
Liberal Democrats	1	23,554 (10.9%)	1	0	1	0
Abolish	0	10,707 (5.0%)	0	0	0	0
Green	0	8,222 (3.8%)	0	0	0	0
People First	0	1,496 (0.7%)	0	0	0	0
Welsh Christian	0	1,103 (0.5%)	0	0	0	0
Monster Raving Loony	0	1,071 (0.5%)	0	0	0	0
Independent	0	1,032 (0.5%)	0	0	0	0
Welsh Communist Party	0	423 (0.2%)	0	0	0	0

=== Regional AMs elected 2016 ===
Party	Name
UKIP	Neil Hamilton
Labour	Joyce Watson
Plaid Cymru	Simon Thomas
Labour	Eluned Morgan

== 2011 Welsh Assembly election additional members ==
Party	Constituency seats	List votes (vote %)	D'Hondt entitlement	Additional Members elected	Total Members elected	Deviation from D'Hondt entitlement
Plaid Cymru	3	56,384 (26.7%)	4	1	4	0
Conservative	3	52,905 (25.1%)	3	0	3	0
Labour	1	47,348 (22.5%)	3	2	3	0
Liberal Democrats	1	26,847 (12.7%)	2	1	2	0
UKIP	0	9,711 (4.6%)	0	0	0	0
Green	0	8,660 (4.1%)	0	0	0	0
Socialist Labour	0	3,951 (1.9%)	0	0	0	0
BNP	0	2,821 (1.3%)	0	0	0	0
Welsh Christian	0	1,630 (0.8%)	0	0	0	0
Communist	0	595 (0.3%)	0	0	0	0

=== Regional AMs elected 2011 ===
Party	Name
Labour	Rebecca Evans
Labour	Joyce Watson
Liberal Democrats	William Powell
Plaid Cymru	Simon Thomas

== 2007 Welsh Assembly election additional members ==
Party	Constituency seats	List votes (vote %)	D'Hondt entitlement	Additional Members elected	Total Members elected	Deviation from D'Hondt entitlement
Plaid Cymru	4	67,258 (31.0%)	5	1	5	0
Conservative	2	49,606 (22.9%)	3	1	3	0
Labour	0	39,979 (18.4%)	2	2	2	0
Liberal Democrats	2	28,790 (13.3%)	2	0	2	0
Green	0	8,768 (4.0%)	0	0	0	0
UKIP	0	8,191 (3.8%)	0	0	0	0
BNP	0	6,389 (2.9%)	0	0	0	0
Socialist Labour	0	2,196 (1.0%)	0	0	0	0
Independent (Gwynoro Jones)	0	1,598 (0.7%)	0	0	0	0
Welsh Christian	0	1,493 (0.7%)	0	0	0	0
Independent (Caroline Evans)	0	1,108 (0.5%)	0	0	0	0
Communist	0	666 (0.3%)	0	0	0	0
Veritas	0	502 (0.2%)	0	0	0	0
CPA	0	413 (0.2%)	0	0	0	0

=== Regional AMs elected 2007 ===
Party	Name
Conservative	Nick Bourne
Labour	Alun Davies
Plaid Cymru	Nerys Evans
Labour	Joyce Watson

== 2003 Welsh Assembly election additional members ==
Party	Constituency seats	List votes (vote %)	D'Hondt entitlement	Additional Members elected	Total Members elected	Deviation from D'Hondt entitlement
Plaid Cymru	3	51,874 (28.16%)	4	1	4	0
Labour	3	46,451 (25.22%)	3	0	3	0
Conservative	0	35,566 (19.31%)	3	3	3	0
Liberal Democrats	2	30,177 (16.38%)	2	0	2	0
Green	0	7,794 (4.23%)	0	0	0	0
UKIP	0	5,945 (3.23%)	0	0	0	0
Mid & West Wales Pensioners	0	3,968 (2.15%)	0	0	0	0
Cymru Annibynnol	0	1,324 (0.72%)	0	0	0	0
Vote No 2 Stop the War	0	716 (0.39%)	0	0	0	0
ProLife Alliance	0	383 (0.21%)	0	0	0	0

=== Regional AMs elected 2003 ===
Party	Name
Conservative	Nick Bourne
Conservative	Glyn Davies
Plaid Cymru	Helen Mary Jones
Conservative	Lisa Francis

== 1999 Welsh Assembly election additional members ==
Party	Constituency seats	List votes (vote %)	D'Hondt entitlement	Additional Members elected	Total Members elected	Deviation from D'Hondt entitlement
Plaid Cymru	4	84,554 (38.55%)	5	1	5	0
Labour	2	53,842 (24.55%)	3	1	3	0
Conservative	0	36,622 (16.70%)	2	2	2	0
Liberal Democrats	2	31,683 (14.44%)	2	0	2	0
Green	0	7,718 (3.52%)	0	0	0	0
Socialist Labour	0	3,019 (1.38%)	0	0	0	0
Independent	0	1,214 (0.55%)	0	0	0	0
Natural Law	0	705 (0.32%)	0	0	0	0

=== Regional AMs elected 1999 ===
Party	Name
Conservative	Nick Bourne
Labour	Alun Michael (Michael resigned in May of 2000 and was replaced by Delyth Evans.)
Plaid Cymru	Cynog Dafis
Conservative	Glyn Davies
