= Brecon and Radnorshire =

Brecon and Radnorshire may refer to:

- Brecon and Radnorshire (UK Parliament constituency)
- Brecon and Radnorshire (Senedd constituency)
