= William Powell (Liberal Democrat politician) =

Welsh politician (born 1965)

Cllr William Powell
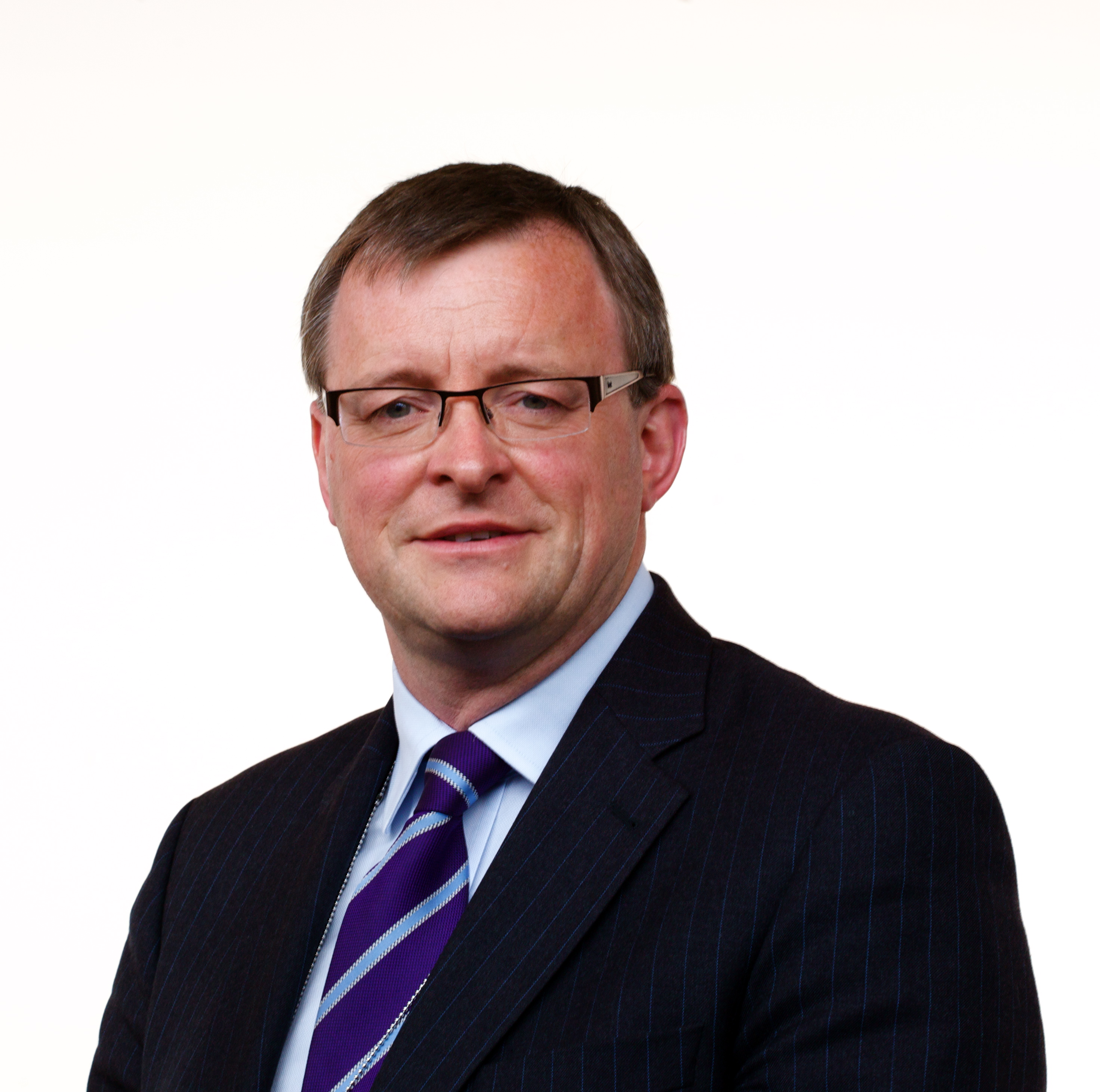
- Official portrait, 2011

Member of the Welsh Assembly for Mid and West Wales
- In office May 2011 – May 2016
- Preceded by: Nick Bourne (Conservative)
- Succeeded by: Neil Hamilton (UKIP)

Personal details
- Born: May 1965 (age 61) Talgarth, Powys, Wales
- Party: Welsh Liberal Democrats (since 1999)
- Other political affiliations: Pro Euro Conservative Party (1999); Welsh Conservatives (till 1999)
- Education: Pembroke College, Oxford

William Denston Powell (born May 1965) is a Welsh Liberal Democrat politician. He was the Member of the Welsh Assembly (AM) for the Mid and West Wales Region from 2011 to 2016.

== Background ==
Powell attended Talgarth Community Primary School and Gwernyfed High School, gaining a scholarship to read Modern Languages (French and German) at Pembroke College, Oxford. He is a qualified teacher and has taught French and German at a number of schools in Wales and the Marches. Latterly, William was Head of German at Hereford Sixth Form College, where he was also the European Officer.

In 1998 he was awarded County Winner of the Royal Welsh Agricultural Society Agri-Environment Award.

Powell has consistently attended the annual Cilmeri commemoration to mark the last battle of Prince Llywelyn.

== Political career ==
Powell represents the Talgarth ward on Powys County Council and is active in rural regeneration projects, including the restoration of Talgarth Mill, of which he is a founder Director. He is also a Member of the FUW, a Governor of Talgarth CP School and Gwernyfed High School. He is also a member of the Lloyd George Society, where he serves on the Committee. He is a former member of the Brecon Beacons National Park Authority.

For many years Powell has been one of the central figures in the European Movement in Wales. He was a founding Board Member of Wales in Europe and is an active Member of Wales Council European Movement, which he chaired for over a decade. In addition, he is a Council Member of the European Liberal Democrats (ALDE) which includes Liberal sister-parties from across Europe. In 1999 he stood for the Pro-Euro Conservative Party in the European election in Wales but joined the Liberal Democrats shortly afterwards.

=== Member of the Welsh Assembly ===
He was elected as the first Welsh Liberal Democrat Assembly Member for the Mid and West Wales region in the elections in May 2011. Following the election he was Welsh Liberal Democrat Spokesperson for Environment, Sustainable Development and Rural Affairs.

Within the Assembly, Powell was Chair of the Petitions Committee throughout the 4th Assembly and a member for the Environment and Sustainability Committee. He represented the Welsh Liberal Democrats in the National Assembly on both the Commonwealth Parliamentary Association (CPA) and the British-Irish Parliamentary Assembly (BIPA). He was also Chair of the Cross Party Group on Europe.

As Chair of the Assembly's Petitions Committee, he was central to a number of successful petitions, including one on term-time school holidays, one calling for the construction of a second Dyfi bridge and a further one which successfully resulted in the reinstatement of the Diabetes Reference Group for Powys.

In January 2014, the BBC and Western Mail reported that Powell had been given a formal warning by the Liberal Democrats for inappropriate behaviour towards a young female party activist.

In July 2014, Powell hit out at Alun Davies AM for seeking to gain personal information on him and four other Assembly Members, Andrew RT Davies, Llyr Huws Gruffydd, Kirsty Williams and Antoinette Sandbach, regarding EU farming subsidies received by their respective family businesses. Alun Davies believed this caused a conflict of interest, however the Minister's actions led directly to his sacking by First Minister Carwyn Jones and Alun Davies subsequently issued a personal apology to all AMs involved regarding EU farming subsidies received by their respective family businesses.

In 2015 Powell was shortlisted for the Wales Green Energy Awards in recognition for his support for renewable energy throughout his time as an Assembly Member. He spoke about the topic during Plenary sessions, and worked with energy companies to try and advance their case, whilst at the same time ensuring that the communities and businesses he represents have their voices heard.

For the 2016 Welsh Assembly election, Powell ran in Carmarthen East and Dinefwr, coming sixth with 837 votes (3%). No Liberal Democrat AMs were returned in any of the regions, with Powell having unsuccessfully headed the party list in Mid and West Wales.

=== Subsequent activity ===
He was re-elected as a County Councillor for Talgarth in Powys in 2022.

Ahead of the 2021 Senedd election, Kirsty Williams, Minister for Education and the member for Brecon and Radnorshire, announced that she would not be seeking re-election. Powell was selected as the Liberal Democrats' candidate for the constituency in December 2020. At the time, this was the party's only seat in the Senedd. He was unsuccessful in defending the constituency, which saw the Conservatives take the seat with a majority of nearly 4,000 votes. Powell finished a distant second, receiving 8,291 votes (27.8%). As a consequence of losing the constituency seat, the Liberal Democrats gained representation on the regional list, with Jane Dodds being elected. Powell, himself, was placed second on the list. Powell has been a consant campaigner for an improvement in the NHS in Powys, even before the Senedd election campaign, particularly on the issues of cross border health care between England and Wales.

In preparation for the 2024 general election, Powell was selected to be his party's candidate for Monmouthshire. He came fifth, taking 2,279 votes (4.5%). In 2025 Powell became Chair of Powys Council Council.

While initially announced as a candidate in Brycheiniog Tawe Nedd constituency for the 2026 Senedd election, he was not on the final list of candidates.

== Personal life ==
Powell lives with his family on their farm in the Black Mountains near Talgarth, Powys, where his ancestors have farmed since the 18th century.

On 26 March 2020, he was admitted to Nevill Hall Hospital in Abergavenny with COVID-19 symptoms. He spent two and a half weeks of his three-week stay in an induced coma on a ventilator.

Senedd
Preceded by Nick Bourne	Assembly Member for Mid and West Wales; 2011–2016	Succeeded by Neil Hamilton
