= Montgomeryshire (Senedd constituency) =

Senedd constituency (1999–2026)

Coordinates: 52°37′50″N 3°26′37″W

Montgomeryshire Sir Drefaldwyn
- Former Senedd county constituency for the Senedd

- Montgomeryshire shown within the Mid and West Wales electoral region and the region shown within Wales

Former Senedd county constituency
- Created: 1999
- Abolished: 2026
- Party: Conservative
- MS: Russell George
- Preserved county: Powys

Montgomeryshire (Welsh: Sir Drefaldwyn) was a constituency of the Senedd. It elected one Member of the Senedd by the first past the post method of election. Also, however, it was one of eight constituencies in the Mid and West Wales electoral region, which elected four additional members, in addition to eight constituency members, to produce a degree of proportional representation for the region as a whole.

== Boundaries ==
Map of 2007–2026 boundaries

=== 1999 to 2007 ===
The constituency was created for the first election to the Assembly, in 1999, with the name and boundaries of the Montgomeryshire Westminster constituency. It was entirely within the preserved county of Powys, and one of three Powys constituencies. Also, it was one of eight constituencies in the Mid and West Wales electoral region.

The other Powys constituencies were Brecon and Radnorshire and Clwyd South. Brecon and Radnorshire was also entirely within the preserved county of Powys, and within the Mid and West Wales region. Clwyd South was mostly a Clwyd constituency, and within the North Wales electoral region.

The region consisted of the eight constituencies of Brecon and Radnorshire, Carmarthen East and Dinefwr, Carmarthen West and South Pembrokeshire, Ceredigion, Llanelli, Meirionnydd Nant Conwy, Montgomeryshire and Preseli Pembrokeshire.

=== From 2007 ===
Constituency and regional boundaries changed for the 2007 Assembly election. Montgomeryshire remained a Powys constituency, however, and one of eight constituencies in the Mid and West Wales electoral region.

Montgomeryshire was one of two constituencies covering Powys, both entirely within the preserved county, and both within the Mid and West Wales region. The other Powys constituency was Brecon and Radnorshire.

The Mid and West Wales region consisted of the constituencies of Brecon and Radnorshire, Carmarthen East and Dinefwr, Carmarthen West and South Pembrokeshire, Ceredigion, Dwyfor Meirionnydd, Llanelli, Montgomeryshire and Preseli Pembrokeshire.

For Westminster purposes, the same new constituency boundaries became effective for the 2010 United Kingdom general election.

== Voting ==
In general elections for the Senedd, each voter had two votes. The first vote was used to vote for a candidate to become the Member of the Senedd for the voter's constituency, elected by the first past the post system. The second vote was used to vote for a regional closed party list of candidates. Additional member seats were allocated from the lists by the d'Hondt method, with constituency results being taken into account in the allocation.

== Assembly members and Members of the Senedd ==
Election	Member	Party	Portrait
1999	Mick Bates	Liberal Democrat	
2010	Mick Bates	Independent	
2011	Russell George	Conservative	
2025	Russell George	Independent	

== Elections ==
=== Elections in the 2020s ===
2021 Senedd election: Montgomeryshire
Party	Candidate	Constituency			Regional		
Party	Candidate	Votes	%	±%	Votes	%	±%
Conservative	Russell George (Note: Incumbent member for this constituency)	12,013	48.1	+6.3	9,344	37.6	+5.6
Plaid Cymru	Elwyn Vaughan	4,485	17.9	+7.7	4,112	16.5	+4.3
Liberal Democrats	Alison Alexander	4,207	16.8	-10.9	3,398	13.7	-6.5
Labour	Kait Duerden	3,576	14.3	+8.4	4,305	17.3	+8.4
Reform	Oliver Lewis	549	2.2	New	254	1.02	New
Gwlad	Gwyn Evans	157	0.6	New	93	0.37	New
Green					1,155	4.6	-0.5
Abolish					1,379	5.6	-2.6
UKIP					456	1.8	-9.8
Christian					134	0.5	New
Freedom Alliance (UK)					118	0.47	New
Propel					50	0.2	New
Communist					40	0.2	0.0
TUSC					26	0.11	New
Majority		7,528	30.2	+16.1			
Turnout		24,987					
Conservative hold		Swing					

=== Elections in the 2010s ===
Welsh Assembly Election 2016: Montgomeryshire
Party	Candidate	Constituency			Regional		
Party	Candidate	Votes	%	±%	Votes	%	±%
Conservative	Russell George	9,875	41.8	-1.9	7,483	32.0	-5.0
Liberal Democrats	Jane Dodds	6,536	27.7	-5.9	4,742	20.2	-3.8
UKIP	Des Parkinson	2,458	10.4	New	2,718	11.6	+4.6
Plaid Cymru	Aled Morgan Hughes	2,410	10.2	-1.1	2,856	12.2	-0.3
Labour	Martyn Singelton	1,389	5.9	-5.5	2,080	8.9	-2.0
Green	Richard Chaloner	932	3.9	New	1,185	5.1	+0.6
Abolish					1,915	8.2	New
Monster Raving Loony					110	0.5	New
Welsh Christian					108	0.5	-0.2
Association of Welsh Independents					91	0.4	New
People First (Wales)					86	0.4	New
Communist					45	0.2	-0.1
Majority		3,339	14.1	+4.0			
Turnout		23,600	48.5	+1.3			
Conservative hold		Swing					

Welsh Assembly Election 2011: Montgomeryshire
Party	Candidate	Constituency			Regional		
Party	Candidate	Votes	%	±%	Votes	%	±%
Conservative	Russell George	10,026	43.7	+13.5	8,478	37.0	+4.6
Liberal Democrats	Wyn Williams	7,702	33.6	−5.4	5,501	24.0	+1.0
Labour	Nick Colbourne	2,609	11.4	+4.5	2,489	10.9	+2.8
Plaid Cymru	David Senior	2,596	11.3	−2.5	2,865	12.5	-3.6
UKIP					1,600	7.0	-1.3
Green					1,033	4.5	-0.4
Socialist Labour					344	1.5	+0.9
BNP					367	1.6	-2.9
Welsh Christian					161	0.7	0.0
Communist					67	0.3	-0.1
Majority		2,324	10.1	N/A			
Turnout		22,933	47.2	+1.1			
Conservative gain from Liberal Democrats		Swing	+9.5				

Regional ballots rejected: 270

=== Elections in the 2000s ===
Welsh Assembly Election 2007: Montgomeryshire
Party	Candidate	Constituency			Regional		
Party	Candidate	Votes	%	±%	Votes	%	±%
Liberal Democrats	Mick Bates	8,704	39.0	−0.7	5,111	23.0	-9.1
Conservative	Dan Munford	6,725	30.2	+1.6	7,191	32.4	+4.8
Plaid Cymru	David Thomas	3,076	13.8	+2.5	3,519	15.9	+2.6
UKIP	Charles Lawson	2,251	10.1	+7.7	1,842	8.3	+2.3
Labour	Rachel Maycock	1,544	6.9	−4.1	1,790	8.1	-4.8
Green					1,083	4.9	+0.6
BNP					1,080	4.5	New
Welsh Christian					164	0.7	New
Socialist Labour					123	0.6	New
Gwynoro Jones - Independent					91	0.4	New
Caroline Evans - Independent					92	0.4	New
Communist					86	0.4	New
Veritas					54	0.2	New
CPA					46	0.2	New
Majority		1,979	8.8	−5.4			
Turnout		22,300	46.1	+3.5			
Liberal Democrats hold		Swing	−1.3				

Welsh Assembly Election 2003: Montgomeryshire
Party	Candidate	Constituency			Regional		
Party	Candidate	Votes	%	±%	Votes	%	±%
Liberal Democrats	Mick Bates	7,869	40.4	−8.0	6,211	32.1	-2.9
Conservative	Glyn Davies	5,572	28.6	+5.9	5,344	27.6	+5.1
Labour	Rina J. Clarke	2,039	10.5	−1.8	2,497	12.9	-1.7
Plaid Cymru	David H. Senior	1,918	9.8	−6.8	2,574	13.3	-10.0
UKIP	David W.L. Rowlands	1,107	5.7	New	1,164	6.0	New
Green					835	4.3	+0.4
Mid and West Wales Pensioners					470	2.4	New
Cymru Annibynnol					164	0.8	New
Vote 2 Stop the War					81	0.4	New
ProLife Alliance					32	0.1	New
Majority		2,297	11.8	−12.9			
Turnout		19,490	42.7	−6.7			
Liberal Democrats hold		Swing	−7.0				

2003 Electorate: 45,598
Regional ballots rejected: 250

=== Elections in the 1990s ===
Welsh Assembly Election 1999: Montgomeryshire
Party	Candidate	Constituency			Regional		
Party	Candidate	Votes	%	±%	Votes	%	±%
Liberal Democrats	Mick Bates	10,374	48.4	N/A	7,486	35.0	N/A
Conservative	Glyn Davies	4,870	22.7	N/A	4,813	22.5	N/A
Plaid Cymru	David H. Senior	3,554	16.6	N/A	4,770	22.3	N/A
Labour	Chris S. Hewitt	2,638	12.3	N/A	3,182	14.6	N/A
Green					827	3.9	N/A
Socialist Labour					209	1.0	N/A
Other list parties					145	0.7	
Majority		5,504	25.7	N/A			
Turnout		21,436	49.4	N/A			
Liberal Democrats win (new seat)							
