= Tom Giffard =

Welsh politician (born 1991)

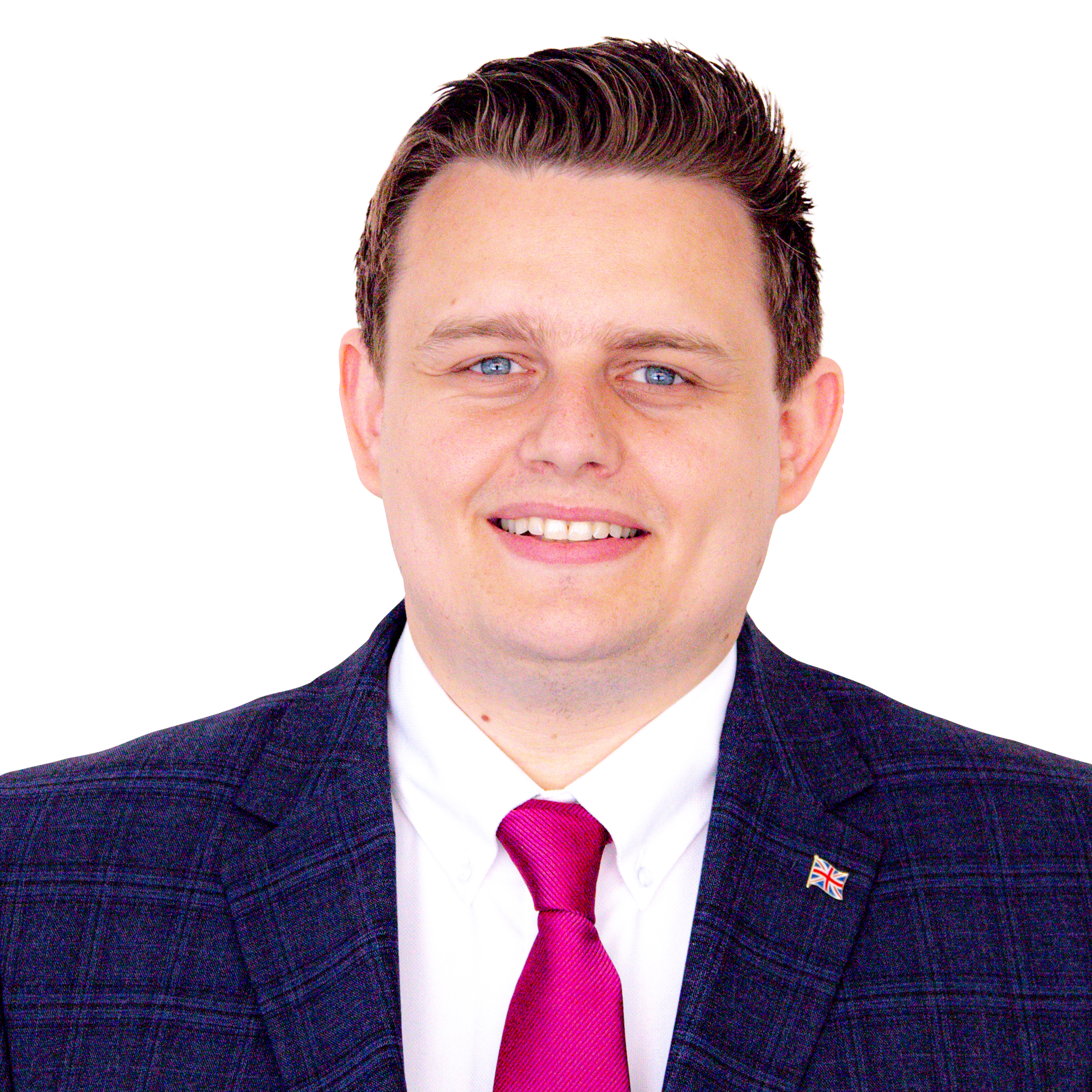

Shadow Minister for Education and Welsh Language
- In office 18 April 2024 – 12 December 2024
- Leader: Andrew RT Davies
- Preceded by: Laura Anne Jones Education; Sam Kurtz Welsh Language
- Succeeded by: Natasha Asghar Education; Sam Kurtz Welsh Language

Shadow Minister for Culture, Tourism and Sport
- In office 27 May 2021 – 18 April 2024
- Leader: Andrew RT Davies
- Preceded by: David Melding
- Succeeded by: Laura Anne Jones

Member of the Senedd for South Wales West
- In office 7 May 2021 – 7 April 2026
- Preceded by: Multi-member constituency
- Succeeded by: Constituency abolished

Personal details
- Born: 1 April 1991 (age 35) Swansea, Wales
- Party: Welsh Conservative
- Children: 1
- Education: Swansea University

Tom Giffard (born 1 April 1991) is a Welsh Conservative politician who served as Member of the Senedd (MS) for the region of South Wales West from 2021 to 2026.

== Background ==
Giffard is a second language Welsh speaker. He firstly became a Learning Support Assistant in a Welsh Language primary school. He then went on to complete his studies at Swansea University, receiving a BA in History and Politics.

== Political career ==
Upon his graduation, he then went on to work as a Community Liaison Officer within his region of South Wales West before organising campaigns and working with volunteers in both Swansea and Bridgend. Prior to his election as a Member of the Senedd for South Wales West, Tom held the position of Office Manager for Bridgend MP, Jamie Wallis, Britain's first transgender member of Parliament.

Giffard was a councillor for Brackla on Bridgend County Borough Council from 2017 to 2022. He worked as the leader of the Conservative group on the council until his election to the Senedd in 2021.

He replaced Suzy Davies at the top of the Conservatives' party list for the South Wales West electoral region, as she was not re-selected for the list. He was elected as a Conservative Member of the Senedd for South Wales West in 2021. Shortly after being elected he was appointed as Shadow Minister for Culture, Tourism and Sport. He was reshuffled to be Shadow Minister for Education and the Welsh Language in April 2024.

In June 2023, Giffard read a speech generated with ChatGPT in the Senedd, celebrating Wales' win in the World Cup of Darts that year. He said to the BBC that he used it "to show just how advanced the technology is becoming". In July of the same year he was criticised by then First Minister Mark Drakeford for a 'colonial mentality' when he said that Wales is "given £1.20 for every £1 spent in England" on the health service.

In the 2026 Senedd election, he was an unsuccessful candidate in the Gŵyr Abertawe constituency.
