= Meirionnydd Nant Conwy (Assembly constituency) =

Welsh Assembly constituency (1999–2007)

Coordinates: 52.956°N 3.569°W

Meirionnydd Nant Conwy
Welsh Assembly county constituency
Meirionnydd Nant Conwy shown as one of the 40 Welsh Assembly constituencies
| Created: | 1999 |
| Electoral region: | Mid and West Wales |
| AM 1999–2007: | Dafydd Elis-Thomas |
| Party: | Plaid Cymru (presiding officer) |
| Preserved counties: | Clwyd and Gwynedd |
| Replaced by: | Dwyfor Meirionnydd |

Meirionnydd Nant Conwy was a constituency of the National Assembly for Wales between 1999 and 2007. It elected one Assembly Member by the first past the post method of election. Also, however, it was one of eight constituencies in the Mid and West Wales electoral region, which elected four additional members, in addition to eight constituency members, to produce a degree of proportional representation for the region as a whole.

== Boundaries ==
The constituency was created for the first election to the Assembly, in 1999, with the name and boundaries of the Meirionnydd Nant Conwy Westminster constituency. It was partly within the preserved county of Clwyd and partly within the preserved county of Gwynedd. The constituency was abolished following boundary changes for the 2007 Assembly elections.

The other seven constituencies of the region were Brecon and Radnorshire, Carmarthen East and Dinefwr, Carmarthen West and South Pembrokeshire, Ceredigion, Llanelli, Montgomeryshire and Preseli Pembrokeshire.

== Voting ==
In elections for the National Assembly for Wales, each voter has two votes. The first vote may be used to vote for a candidate to become the Assembly Member for the voter's constituency, elected by the first past the post system. The second vote may be used to vote for a regional closed party list of candidates. Additional member seats are allocated from the lists by the d'Hondt method, with constituency results being taken into account in the allocation.

== Assembly members ==
| Period | Member | Party | Portrait |
|---|---|---|---|
| 1999 | Dafydd Elis-Thomas | Plaid Cymru | |
| 2007 | constituency abolished | | |

== Elections ==
=== 2003 ===
Welsh Assembly Election 2003: Meirionnydd Nant Conwy
| Party | Candidate | Constituency | | | Regional | | |
| Party | Candidate | Votes | % | ±% | Votes | % | ±% |
|---|---|---|---|---|---|---|---|
| Plaid Cymru | Dafydd Elis-Thomas | 8,717 | 57.4 | ▼6.4 | 7,241 | 47.7 | |
| Labour | Edwin Woodward | 2,891 | 19.0 | ▲1.6 | 2,964 | 19.5 | |
| Conservative | Lisa Francis | 2,485 | 16.4 | ▲4.9 | 2,416 | 15.9 | |
| Liberal Democrats | Kenneth Harris | 1,100 | 7.2 | ▼0.1 | 1,321 | 8.7 | |
| Green | | | | | 685 | 4.5 | |
| UKIP | | | | | 193 | 1.3 | |
| Mid and West Wales Pensioners | | | | | 185 | 1.2 | |
| Cymru Annibynnol | | | | | 91 | 0.6 | |
| Vote 2 Stop the War | | | | | 48 | 0.3 | |
| ProLife Alliance | | | | | 37 | 0.2 | |
| Majority | | 5,826 | 38.4 | ▼8.0 | | | |
| Turnout | | 15,193 | 45.0 | ▼17.3 | | | |
| Plaid Cymru hold | | Swing | ▼4.0 | | | | |

=== 1999 ===
Welsh Assembly Election 1999: Meirionnydd Nant Conwy
| Party | Candidate | Constituency | | | Regional | | |
| Party | Candidate | Votes | % | ±% | Votes | % | ±% |
|---|---|---|---|---|---|---|---|
| Plaid Cymru | Dafydd Elis-Thomas | 12,034 | 63.8 | N/A | 10,241 | 54.1 | N/A |
| Labour | Denise Idris Jones | 3,292 | 17.4 | N/A | 3,738 | 19.8 | N/A |
| Conservative | Owen J Williams | 2,170 | 11.5 | N/A | 2,597 | 13.7 | N/A |
| Liberal Democrats | Graham Worley | 1,378 | 7.3 | N/A | 1,357 | 7.2 | N/A |
| All other list parties | | | | | 987 | 5.2 | N/A |
| Majority | | 8,742 | 46.4 | N/A | | | |
| Turnout | | 18,874 | 57.3 | N/A | | | |
| Plaid Cymru win (new seat) | | | | | | | |
