= Cefin Campbell =

Welsh politician (born 1958)

Cefin Campbell MS
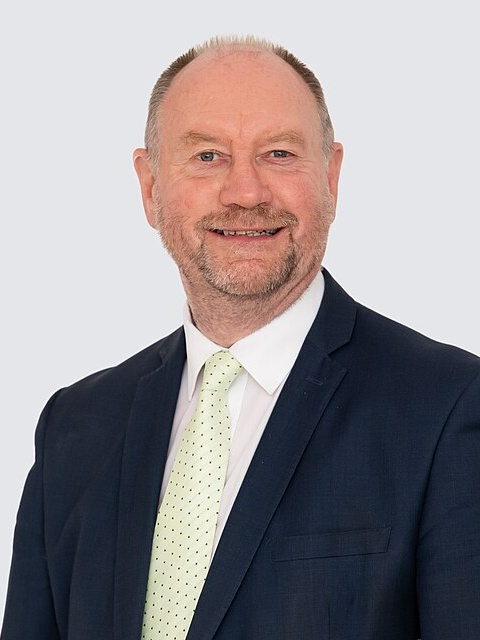
- Official portrait, 2026

Deputy Minister for Skills and Tertiary Education
- Incumbent
- Assumed office 13 May 2026
- First Minister: Rhun ap Iorwerth
- Preceded by: Jack Sargeant

Member of the Senedd
- Incumbent
- Assumed office 7 May 2021
- Preceded by: Helen Mary Jones
- Constituency: Mid and West Wales (2021–2026); Sir Gaerfyrddin (2026-present)

Personal details
- Born: Cefin Arthur Campbell; June 1958 (age 68) Glanaman, Wales
- Party: Plaid Cymru
- Children: 3

Cefin Arthur Campbell (born June 1958) is a Welsh Plaid Cymru politician who has been Member of the Senedd (MS) for Sir Gaerfyrddin since 2026, previously representing Mid and West Wales from 2021.

== Academic career ==
Campbell is a former Lecturer working at Swansea University teaching Welsh for adults and Cardiff University teaching Welsh Language and Literature and Welsh History.

He was appointed to lead the first Menter Iaith (Community Language Initiative) in Wales in 1991. Campbell was a member of the S4C Authority, and also as a language advisor to Bòrd na Gàidhlig in Scotland. He also worked as a school inspector with Estyn.

In 2008 Campbell started Sbectrwm consulting firm specializing in research, strategic planning, project management and training. He was the director until his election to the Senedd.

== Political career ==
He was elected as a Carmarthenshire county Councillor for Llanfihangel Aberbythych in 2012, and again in 2017 when he became Executive Board member for Communities and Rural Affairs. As an Executive Board member he chaired a cross-party group that developed a comprehensive strategy to promote the Welsh language within the Council, a strategy to regenerate rural Carmarthenshire, an innovative plan to tackle poverty, an action plan to ensure that Carmarthenshire reaches net zero carbon by 2035 and produced a report to tackle racism and discrimination.

In the 2021 Senedd election, Campbell stood in the Carmarthen West and South Pembrokeshire constituency and came third with 6,615 votes. He also stood at the top of the Mid and West regional list for Plaid Cymru and was elected.

Upon election to the Senedd he was appointed Plaid Cymru shadow spokesperson for Rural Affairs and Agriculture, and also has an interest in supporting legislation to tackle the second homes crisis, tackling poverty and creating one million Welsh speakers.

In January 2022, Cefin Campbell was announced as one of Plaid Cymru's Designated Members as part of the party's Co-operation Agreement with the Welsh Government.

In the 2026 Senedd election, Campbell was re-elected as MS, representing the new Sir Gaerfyrddin Senedd constituency.

== Personal life ==
Campbell is married with three daughters and lives in Gelli Aur, Carmarthenshire. His family on his father’s side were miners and on his mother’s side were farmers.

Campbell has a brother, Darrel, who is a semi-retired teacher. Darrel was injured whilst protecting students during a mass stabbing at Ysgol Dyffryn Aman in 2024.

Senedd
Preceded by Helen Mary Jones	Member of the Senedd for Mid and West Wales; 2021 – present	Succeeded by Seat abolished
