= Lisa Francis =

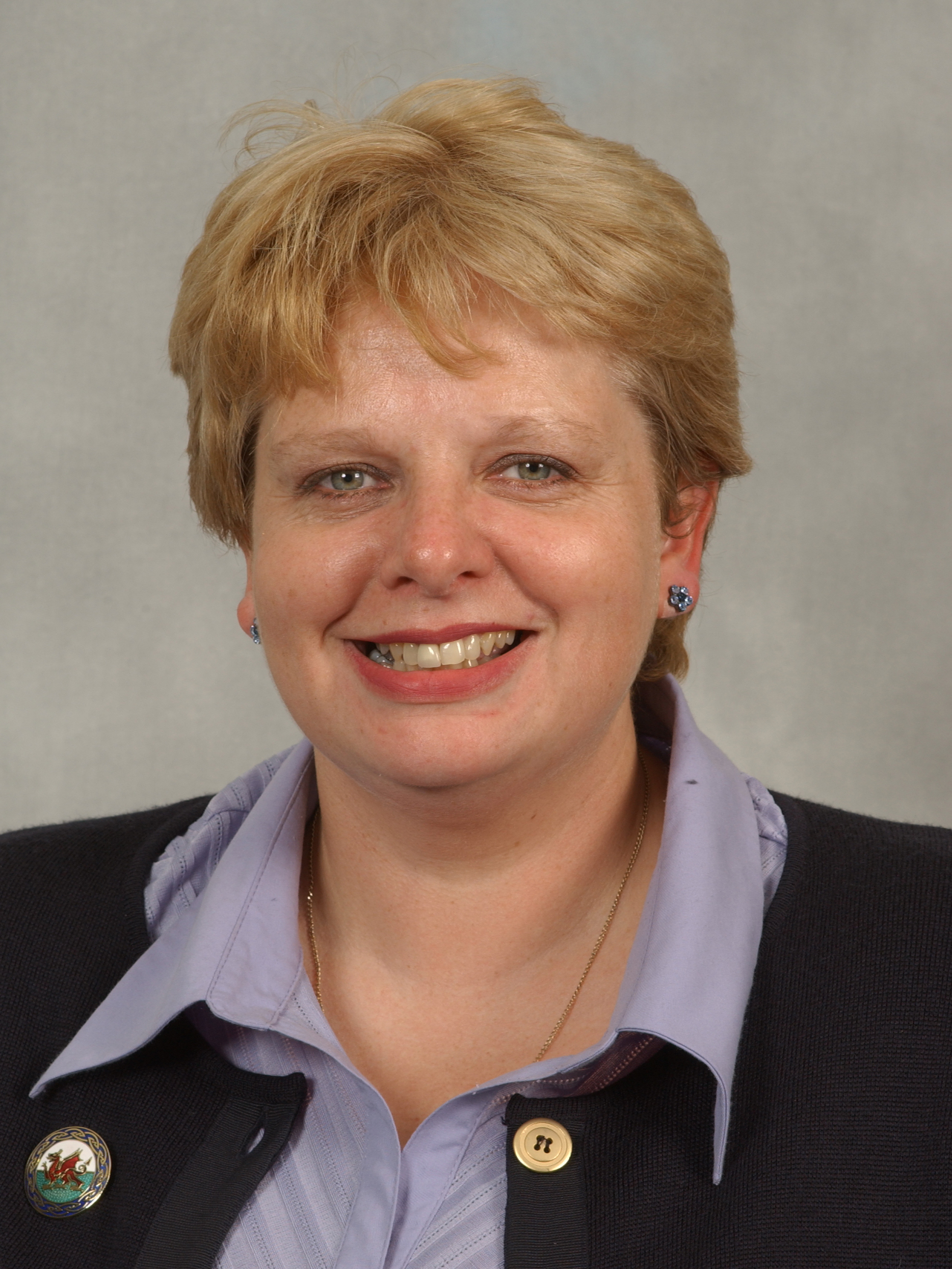
- Official portrait, 2003

Member of the Welsh Assembly for Mid and West Wales
- In office 1 May 2003 – 3 May 2007
- Preceded by: Delyth Evans
- Succeeded by: Joyce Watson

Personal details
- Born: 1960 (age 65–66)
- Party: Independent
- Other political affiliations: Welsh Conservative (Until 2012)

Elizabeth Ann Francis (born 1960), known as Lisa Francis, is a former Welsh Conservative politician who was a Member of the Welsh Assembly (AM) for the Mid and West Wales region from 2003 to 2007.

== Career ==
Francis was the Conservative candidate in Meirionnydd Nant Conwy in the 2001 general election, coming third in the seat. At the 2003 National Assembly for Wales election she contested the Meirionnydd Nant Conwy constituency and was placed third on the Conservatives' list for the Mid and West Wales region. She was elected as the regional list member for Mid and West Wales, while coming third in Meirionnydd Nant Conwy, receiving 16.4% of the vote.

After being elected, she was appointed as Welsh Conservative spokeswoman for Culture and the Welsh Language. She was not re-elected at the 2007 National Assembly for Wales election. After losing her seat, she studied for a degree in Tourism Management at Aberystwyth University. She returned to contest the Mid and West Wales list at 2011 National Assembly for Wales election, but again was not elected.

In 2007 Francis also served on Aberystwyth's Town Council. She was also Deputy Chair of Mid & West Wales Area Conservative Council, but subsequently left the Conservatives.

In addition to her political activities, Francis is a Director of the Mid Wales Tourism Company and is the Trade Representative for Ceredigion. She also serves on Ceredigion Hospital's Working Committee and on the Aberystwyth Citizens Advice Bureau – Management Board.

In 2007 Francis won the Dods Assembly Woman of the Year Award. .

She supported Mark Williams of the Liberal Democrats at the 2019 United Kingdom general election.

She is supporting the Welsh Conservatives at the 2026 Senedd election.

== Offices held ==
Senedd
Preceded by Delyth Evans	Assembly Member for Mid and West Wales; 2003 – 2007	Succeeded by Joyce Watson
