= Brecon and Radnorshire (Senedd constituency) =

Senedd constituency (1999–2026)

Coordinates: 52.094°N 3.382°W

Brecon and Radnorshire Brycheiniog a Sir Faesyfed
- Former Senedd county constituency for the Senedd

- Brecon and Radnorshire shown within the Mid and West Wales electoral region and the region shown within Wales

Former Senedd county constituency
- Created: 1999
- Abolished: 2026
- Party: Reform UK
- MS: James Evans
- Preserved county: Powys

Brecon and Radnorshire (Welsh: Brycheiniog a Sir Faesyfed) was a constituency of the Senedd. It elected one Member of the Senedd by the first past the post method of election. Also, however, it was one of eight constituencies in the Mid and West Wales electoral region, which elected four additional members, in addition to eight constituency members, to produce a degree of proportional representation for the region as a whole. It has been represented since May 2021 by James Evans, who elected as a Conservative, but had the whip removed in January 2026 before joining Reform UK in February 2026.

== Boundaries ==
Map of 1999–2026 boundaries

=== 1999 to 2007 ===
The constituency was created for the first election to the Assembly, in 1999, with the name and boundaries of the Brecon and Radnorshire Westminster constituency. It was entirely within the preserved county of Powys, and one of three Powys constituencies. Also, it was one of eight constituencies in the Mid and West Wales electoral region.

The other Powys constituencies were Montgomeryshire and Clwyd South. Montgomeryshire was also entirely within the preserved county of Powys, and within the Mid and West Wales region. Clwyd South was partly, and mostly, a Clwyd constituency, and within the North Wales electoral region.

The region consisted of the eight constituencies of Brecon and Radnorshire, Carmarthen East and Dinefwr, Carmarthen West and South Pembrokeshire, Ceredigion, Llanelli, Meirionnydd Nant Conwy, Montgomeryshire and Preseli Pembrokeshire.

=== From 2007 ===
Constituency boundaries changed from the 2007 Assembly election, as did regional boundaries. Brecon and Radnorshire remained a Powys constituency, however, and one of eight constituencies in the Mid and West Wales electoral region.

Brecon and Radnorshire was one of two constituencies covering Powys, both entirely within the preserved county, and both within the Mid and West Wales region. The other Powys constituency was Montgomeryshire.

The Mid and West Wales region consisted of the constituencies of Brecon and Radnorshire, Carmarthen East and Dinefwr, Carmarthen West and South Pembrokeshire, Ceredigion, Dwyfor Meirionnydd, Llanelli, Montgomeryshire and Preseli Pembrokeshire.

For Westminster purposes, the same new constituency boundaries became effective for the 2010 United Kingdom general election and ceased to be used following the 2023 review of Westminster constituencies.

== Members of the Senedd ==
Election	Member	Party
1999	Kirsty Williams	Liberal Democrat
2021	James Evans	Conservative

== Voting ==
In general elections for the Senedd, each voter had two votes. The first vote was used to vote for a candidate to become the Member of the Senedd for the voter's constituency, elected by the first past the post system. The second vote was used to vote for a regional closed party list of candidates. Additional member seats were allocated from the lists by the d'Hondt method, with constituency results being taken into account in the allocation.

== Elections ==
=== Elections in the 2020s ===
2021 Senedd election: Brecon and Radnorshire
Party	Candidate	Constituency			Regional		
Party	Candidate	Votes	%	±%	Votes	%	±%
Conservative	James Evans	12,741	39.7	+14.3	11,572	36.6	+11.2
Liberal Democrats	William Powell	8,921	27.8	–24.6	6,723	21.3	-8.9
Labour	Gethin Jones	4,980	15.5	+6.6	6,217	19.7	+4.9
Plaid Cymru	Grenville Ham	2,075	6.5	+2.6	2,754	8.7	+1.4
Green	Emily Durrant	1,556	4.8	+2.5	1,807	5.7	+1.9
Abolish	Claire Mills	1,209	3.8	New	1,786	5.6	-2.4
Independent	Karen Laurie-Parry	345	1.1	New			
Reform UK	John Muir	213	0.7	New	202	0.64	New
Gwlad	Sam Holwill	75	0.2	New	89	0.28	New
Christian					141	0.44	New
Freedom Alliance (UK)					139	0.4	New
Communist					85	0.27	New
Propel					57	0.18	New
TUSC					34	0.11	New
Majority		3,820	11.9	N/A			
Turnout		32,115	57.5	+1.0			
Conservative gain from Liberal Democrats		Swing	+19.5				

=== Elections in the 2010s ===
Welsh Assembly Election 2016: Brecon and Radnorshire
Party	Candidate	Constituency			Regional		
Party	Candidate	Votes	%	±%	Votes	%	±%
Liberal Democrats	Kirsty Williams	15,898	52.4	+9.4	9,069	30.2	+0.9
Conservative	Gary Price	7,728	25.4	−7.9	7,625	25.4	-7.1
Labour	Alex Thomas	2,703	8.9	−8.0	4,446	14.8	-3.2
UKIP	Thomas Turton	2,161	7.1	New	2,655	8.8	+3.9
Plaid Cymru	Freddy Greaves	1,180	3.9	−2.8	2,181	7.3	0.0
Green	Grenville Ham	697	2.3	New	1,145	3.8	-0.6
Abolish					2,388	8.0	New
Monster Raving Loony					180	0.6	New
Welsh Christian					163	0.5	-0.2
People First (Wales)					74	0.2	New
Association of Welsh Independents					63	0.2	New
Communist					41	0.1	-0.2
Majority		8,170	27.0	+17.3			
Turnout		30,367	56.5	+3.6			
Liberal Democrats hold		Swing	+8.6				

Welsh Assembly Election 2011: Brecon and Radnorshire
Party	Candidate	Constituency			Regional		
Party	Candidate	Votes	%	±%	Votes	%	±%
Liberal Democrats	Kirsty Williams	12,201	43.0	−9.2	8,271	29.3	-2.1
Conservative	Christopher Davies	9,444	33.3	−0.3	9,181	32.5	-0.5
Labour	Chris Lloyd	4,797	16.9	+8.2	5,091	18.0	+5.2
Plaid Cymru	Gary Price	1,906	6.7	+1.2	2,071	7.3	-0.7
UKIP					1,371	4.9	+0.4
Green					1,251	4.4	0.0
Socialist Labour					471	1.7	+0.8
BNP					291	1.0	-1.7
Welsh Christian					193	0.7	0.0
Communist					75	0.3	0.0
Majority		2,757	9.7	−8.9			
Turnout		28,348	52.9	+1.0			
Liberal Democrats hold		Swing	−4.5				

Regional ballots rejected: 311

=== Elections in the 2000s ===
Welsh Assembly Election 2007: Brecon and Radnorshire
Party	Candidate	Constituency			Regional		
Party	Candidate	Votes	%	±%	Votes	%	±%
Liberal Democrats	Kirsty Williams	15,006	52.2	+2.6	9,014	31.4	-2.3
Conservative	Suzy Davies	9,652	33.6	+3.7	9,454	33.0	+1.3
Labour	Neil Stone	2,514	8.7	−3.0	3,658	12.8	-3.6
Plaid Cymru	Arwel Lloyd	1,576	5.5	+0.5	2,282	8.0	+1.4
UKIP					1,296	4.5	+0.4
Green					1,252	4.4	+0.3
BNP					782	2.7	New
Socialist Labour					270	0.9	New
Welsh Christian					215	0.7	New
Gwynoro Jones -Independent					136	0.5	New
Caroline Evans - Independent					126	0.4	New
Communist					88	0.3	New
CPA					54	0.2	New
Veritas					51	0.2	New
Majority		5,354	18.6	−1.1			
Turnout		28,748	51.9	−1.0			
Liberal Democrats hold		Swing	−0.6				

Welsh Assembly Election 2003: Brecon and Radnorsihire
Party	Candidate	Constituency			Regional		
Party	Candidate	Votes	%	±%	Votes	%	±%
Liberal Democrats	Kirsty Williams	13,325	49.6	+5.0	8,999	33.7	+1.6
Conservative	Nick Bourne	8,017	29.9	+5.4	8,453	31.7	+5.8
Labour	David Rees	3,130	11.7	−6.0	4,385	16.4	-3.1
Plaid Cymru	Brynach Parry	1,329	5.0	−3.1	1,761	6.6	-10.3
Green					1,107	4.1	Unknown
UKIP					1,156	4.3	New
Mid and West Wales Pensioners					509	1.9	New
Cymru Annibynnol					151	0.6	New
Vote 2 Stop the War					113	0.4	New
ProLife Alliance					49	0.2	New
Majority		5,308	19.7	−0.4			
Turnout		28,348	52.9	−4.4			
Liberal Democrats hold		Swing	+0.3				

2003 Electorate: 53,739
Regional ballots rejected: 282

=== Elections in the 1990s ===
Welsh Assembly Election 1999: Brecon and Radnorshire
Party	Candidate	Constituency			Regional		
Party	Candidate	Votes	%	±%	Votes	%	±%
Liberal Democrats	Kirsty Williams	13,022	44.6	N/A	9,309	32.1	N/A
Conservative	Nick Bourne	7,170	24.5	N/A	7,498	25.9	N/A
Labour	Ian Janes	5,165	17.7	N/A	5,667	19.5	N/A
Plaid Cymru	David Petersen	2,356	8.1	N/A	4,891	16.9	N/A
Independent	Michael Shaw	1,502	5.1				
Other list parties					1,636	5.6	N/A
Majority		5,852	20.1				
Turnout		29,215	57.3				
Liberal Democrats win (new seat)							

== See also ==
- Brecon and Radnorshire (UK Parliament constituency)
