= Joyce Watson =

Welsh Senedd Member

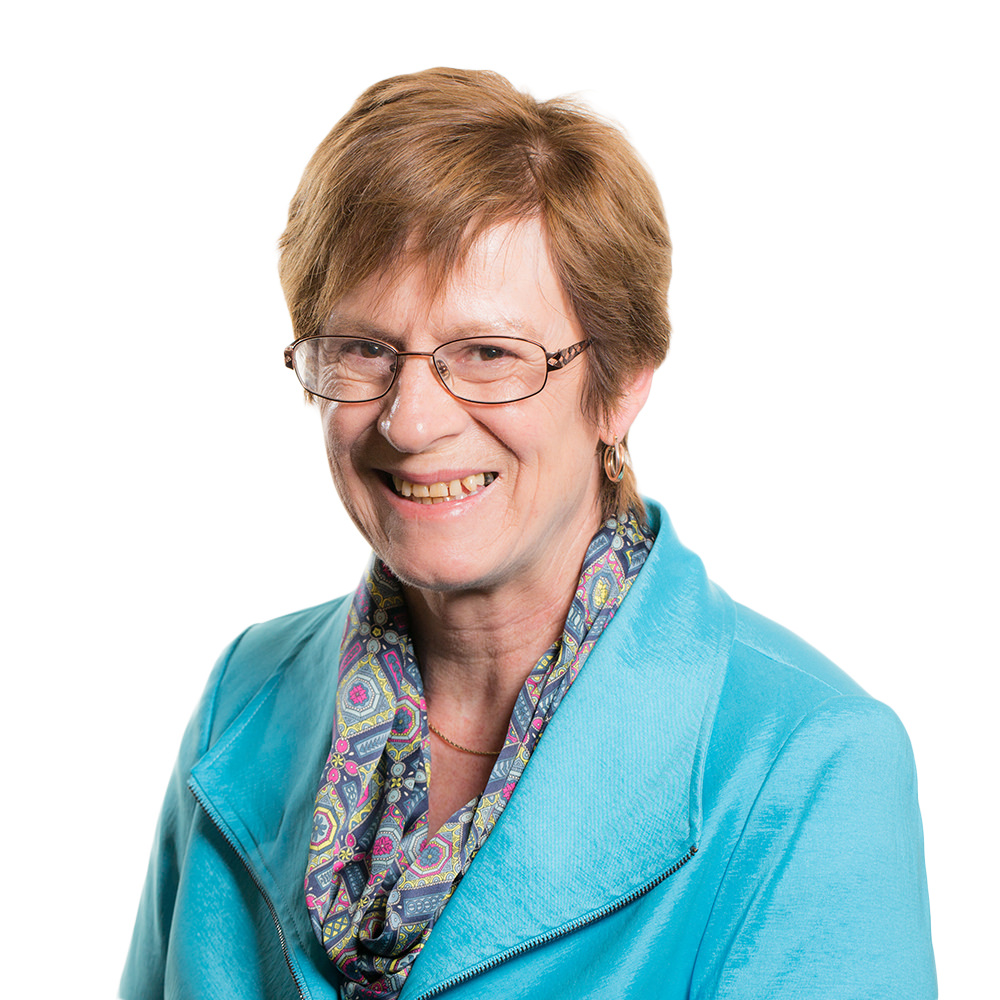
- Watson in 2016

Member of the Senedd for Mid and West Wales
- In office 3 May 2007 – 7 April 2026
- Preceded by: Lisa Francis
- Succeeded by: Seat abolished

Personal details
- Born: 1955 (age 70–71)
- Party: Welsh Labour
- Spouse: Colin Watson
- Children: 3
- Education: Swansea University

Elizabeth Joyce Watson (born 1955) is a Welsh Labour politician who was a Member of the Senedd (MS) for Mid and West Wales from 2007 to 2026.

== Career ==
Watson was educated at Manorbier School, Cosheston School and Cardigan Comprehensive before going on to Pembrokeshire College in 1990. In 1993, she studied politics at Swansea University, later gaining an honours degree at the same time as running Labour's successful parliamentary campaign for Preseli Pembrokeshire.

An active Labour Party member, Watson was elected to Pembrokeshire County Council at the inaugural elections in 1995, capturing a seat in Haverfordwest from the Independents. She retained her seat in 1999 and 2004. She was leader of the Labour group on Pembrokeshire Council for six years.

Watson was elected as an Assembly Member for Mid and West Wales in May 2007. and re-elected in 2011, 2016 and 2021. Watson has sat as a Labour Co-operative member since 2021.

She is currently a member of the Senedd Commission, the corporate body for the Senedd, with responsibility for equalities and Senedd staff. She sits on the Senedd’s Equality, Local Government & Communities committee and chairs the Cross-Party Groups on Construction and Human Trafficking.

In 2016 she was elected chair of the Commonwealth Women Parliamentarians (CWP) British Islands & Mediterranean region, having previously chaired the Wales branch of the Commonwealth Parliamentary Association (CPA). She has represented Wales on the British-Irish Parliamentary Assembly (BIPA) and the Council of Europe's Congress of Local & Regional Authorities.

She is involved in a number of high-profile campaigns. She champions the White Ribbon cause, enlisting support to End Violence against Women. In 2010 she wrote Bordering on Concern, a report on Human Trafficking in Wales. Following its publication, the Welsh Government appointed the UK's first anti-Trafficking commissioner. In 2009 she launched the Women in Construction network; she continues to work with employers and trade bodies to get more young people and women into the construction industry.

She stood down as an MS at the 2026 Senedd election.

== Personal life ==
She is married to Colin and has three children, Heather, Fiona and William. and has run several businesses – public houses, restaurants and retail outlets in Ceredigion, Carmarthenshire and Pembrokeshire.

Watson's father was a prisoner of war during the Second World War, and upon his return to the UK he was suspected of being a German spy. This was because he spoke Welsh as a first language and very little English but had learnt some German while overseas. Following his ordeal he brought up his children only speaking English. Watson is now learning Welsh, and her children were all educated in Welsh medium schools.

Senedd
Preceded by Lisa Francis	Member of the Senedd for Mid and West Wales; 2007 – 2026	Succeeded by seat abolished
