= Carmarthen West and South Pembrokeshire (Senedd constituency) =

Senedd constituency (1999–2026)

Coordinates: 51°47′17″N 4°41′50″W

Carmarthen West and South Pembrokeshire Gorllewin Caerfyrddin a De Sir Benfro
- Former Senedd county constituency for the Senedd

- Carmarthen West and South Pembrokeshire shown within the Mid and West Wales electoral region and the region shown within Wales

Former Senedd county constituency
- Created: 1999
- Abolished: 2026
- Party: Conservative Party
- MS: Samuel Kurtz
- Preserved county: Dyfed

Carmarthen West and South Pembrokeshire (Welsh: Gorllewin Caerfyrddin a De Sir Benfro) was a constituency of the Senedd. It elected one Member of the Senedd by the first past the post method of election. In addition, it was one of eight constituencies in the Mid and West Wales electoral region, which elected four additional members, in addition to eight constituency members, to produce a degree of proportional representation for the region as a whole.

== Boundaries ==
Map of 2007–2026 boundaries

=== 1999 to 2007 ===
The constituency was created for the first election to the Assembly, in 1999, with the name and boundaries of the Carmarthen West and South Pembrokeshire Westminster constituency. It was a Dyfed constituency, one of five constituencies covering, and entirely within, the preserved county of Dyfed.

The other four Dyfed constituencies were Carmarthen East and Dinefwr, Ceredigion, Llanelli and Preseli Pembrokeshire. They were all within the Mid and West Wales electoral region.

The region consisted of the eight constituencies of Brecon and Radnorshire, Carmarthen East and Dinefwr, Carmarthen West and South Pembrokeshire, Ceredigion, Llanelli, Meirionnydd Nant Conwy, Montgomeryshire and Preseli Pembrokeshire.

=== Since 2007 ===
The constituency included the whole of 22 Carmarthenshire communities (Abernant; Bronwydd; Carmarthen; Cilymaenllwyd; Cynwyl Elfed; Eglwyscummin; Henllanfallteg; Laugharne Township; Llanboidy; Llanddowror; Llangain; Llangynin; Llangynog; Llanpumsaint; Llansteffan; Llanwinio; Meidrim; Newchurch and Merthyr; Pendine; St Clears; Trelech; Whitland), the whole of 24 Pembrokeshire communities (Amroth; Angle; Carew; Cosheston; East Williamston; Hundleton; Jeffreyston; Kilgetty/Begelly; Lampeter Velfrey; Lamphey; Llanddewi Velfrey; Llawhaden; Manorbier; Martletwy; Narberth; Pembroke; Pembroke Dock; Penally; St Florence; St Mary Out Liberty; Saundersfoot; Stackpole and Castlemartin; Templeton; and Tenby), also the eastern part of the Pembrokeshire community of Uzmaston, Boulston and Slebech.

Boundaries changed for the 2007 Assembly election. Carmarthen West and South Pembrokeshire remained one of five Dyfed constituencies and one of eight constituencies in the Mid and West Wales region. However, boundaries within Dyfed changed, to realign them with local government ward boundaries and to reduce disparities in the sizes of constituency electorates, and the boundaries of the region changed, to align them with the boundaries of preserved counties.

The other four Dyfed constituencies were, again, Carmarthen East and Dinefwr, Ceredigion, Llanelli and Preseli Pembrokeshire, all within the Mid and West Wales electoral region.

The region consisted of the constituencies of Brecon and Radnorshire, Carmarthen East and Dinefwr, Carmarthen West and South Pembrokeshire, Ceredigion, Dwyfor Meirionnydd, Llanelli, Montgomeryshire and Preseli Pembrokeshire.

For Westminster purposes, the same new constituency boundaries became effective for the 2010 United Kingdom general election.

== Voting ==
In general elections for the Senedd, each voter had two votes. The first vote was used to vote for a candidate to become the Member of the Senedd for the voter's constituency, elected by the first past the post system. The second vote was used to vote for a regional closed party list of candidates. Additional member seats were allocated from the lists by the d'Hondt method, with constituency results being taken into account in the allocation.

== Assembly members and Members of the Senedd ==
Election	Member	Party	Image
1999	Christine Gwyther	Labour	
2007	Angela Burns	Conservative	
2021	Samuel Kurtz	Conservative	

== Elections ==
=== Elections in the 2020s ===
2021 Senedd election: Carmarthen West and South Pembrokeshire
Party	Candidate	Constituency			Regional		
Party	Candidate	Votes	%	±%	Votes	%	±%
Conservative	Samuel Kurtz	11,240	35.5	+0.1	10,463	33.1	+4.6
Labour	Riaz Hassan	10,304	32.6	+8.7	10,190	32.2	+8.0
Plaid Cymru	Cefin Campbell	6,615	20.9	+2.2	6,362	20.1	-0.9
Liberal Democrats	Alistair Cameron	1,224	3.9	+1.5	726	2.3	-0.6
UKIP	Paul Dowson	982	3.1	-8.2	678	2.1	-10.9
Independent	Jon Harvey	866	2.7	New	N/A	N/A	N/A
Reform	Peter Prosser	424	1.3	New	289	0.9	New
Green					1,245	3.9	+0.9
Abolish					1,044	3.3	-1.8
Christian					207	0.7	New
Gwlad					124	0.4	New
Freedom Alliance (UK)					111	0.4	New
Propel					91	0.3	New
Communist					77	0.2	0.0
TUSC					26	0.1	New
Majority		936	2.9	−8.6			
Turnout		31,655	56.35	+5.1			
Conservative hold		Swing					

=== Elections in the 2010s ===
Welsh Assembly Election 2016: Carmarthen West and South Pembrokeshire
Party	Candidate	Constituency			Regional		
Party	Candidate	Votes	%	±%	Votes	%	±%
Conservative	Angela Burns	10,355	35.4	−0.5	8,035	28.5	-3.9
Labour	Marc Tierney	6,982	23.9	−6.6	6,805	24.2	-3.4
Plaid Cymru	Simon Thomas	5,459	18.7	−11.0	5,902	21.0	-3.8
UKIP	Allan Brookes	3,300	11.3	New	3,657	13.0	+8.9
Independent	Chris Overton	1,638	5.6	New			
Green	Valerie Bradley	804	2.7	New	837	3.0	-0.1
Liberal Democrats	Alistair Cameron	699	2.4	−1.5	808	2.9	-0.9
Abolish					1,439	5.1	New
People First (Wales)					120	0.4	New
Association of Welsh Independents					194	0.7	New
Welsh Christian					191	0.7	-0.2
Monster Raving Loony					126	0.4	New
Communist					52	0.2	0.0
Majority		3,373	11.5	+6.1			
Turnout		29,217	51.2	+3.1			
Conservative hold		Swing	+3.1				

Welsh Assembly Election 2011: Carmarthen West and South Pembrokeshire
Party	Candidate	Constituency			Regional		
Party	Candidate	Votes	%	±%	Votes	%	±%
Conservative	Angela Burns	10,095	35.9	+5.8	9,113	32.4	+3.9
Labour	Christine Gwyther	8,591	30.5	+0.8	7,769	27.6	+2.4
Plaid Cymru	Nerys Evans	8,373	29.7	+0.5	6,975	24.8	-1.6
Liberal Democrats	Selwyn Runnett	1,097	3.9	−2.4	1,076	3.8	-1.9
UKIP					1,161	4.1	+0.4
Green					874	3.1	-0.6
Socialist Labour					540	1.9	+0.8
BNP					355	1.3	-1.6
Welsh Christian					257	0.9	+0.3
Communist					45	0.2	-0.1
Majority		1,504	5.4	+5.0			
Turnout		28,156	48.1	−1.6			
Conservative hold		Swing	+2.5				

Regional ballots rejected: 192

=== Elections in the 2000s ===
Welsh Assembly Election 2007: Carmarthen West and South Pembrokeshire
Party	Candidate	Constituency			Regional		
Party	Candidate	Votes	%	±%	Votes	%	±%
Conservative	Angela Burns	8,590	30.1	+9.8	8,135	28.5	+7.2
Labour	Christine Gwyther	8,492	29.7	−5.1	7,182	25.2	-6.0
Plaid Cymru	John Dixon	8,340	29.2	−4.0	7,538	26.4	-0.3
Liberal Democrats	John Gossage	1,806	6.3	−2.9	1,638	5.7	-3.7
Independent	Malcolm Carver	1,340	4.7	New			
Green					1,061	3.7	-0.3
UKIP					1,053	3.7	+0.8
BNP					824	2.9	New
Socialist Labour					308	1.1	New
Gwynoro Jones - Independent politician					245	0.9	New
Welsh Christian					183	0.6	New
Caroline Evans - Independent politician					154	0.5	New
Communist					79	0.3	New
Veritas					67	0.2	New
CPA					63	0.2	New
Majority		98	0.4	N/A			
Turnout		28,568	49.7	+7.0			
Conservative gain from Labour		Swing					

Welsh Assembly Election 2003: Carmarthen West and South Pembrokeshire
Party	Candidate	Constituency			Regional		
Party	Candidate	Votes	%	±%	Votes	%	±%
Labour	Christine Gwyther	8,384	35.0	−0.1	7,451	31.2	+0.8
Plaid Cymru	Llyr Huws Gruffydd	7,869	32.8	+3.0	6,427	26.9	-6.0
Conservative	David N. Thomas	4,917	20.5	+2.5	5,094	21.3	-0.2
Liberal Democrats	Mary K. Megarry	2,222	9.3	+2.6	2,240	9.4	+0.5
Independent	Arthur R. Williams	580	2.4	New			
Green					957	4.0	Unknown
UKIP					691	2.9	New
Mid and West Wales Pensioners					675	2.8	New
Cymru Annibynnol					205	0.9	New
Vote 2 Stop the War					101	0.4	New
Prolife Alliance					42	0.2	New
Majority		515	2.1	−3.2			
Turnout		24,253	43.0	−7.7			
Labour hold		Swing	−1.6				

2003 Electorate: 56,403
Regional ballots rejected: 292

=== Elections in the 1990s ===
Welsh Assembly Election 1999: Carmarthen West and South Pembrokeshire
Party	Candidate	Constituency			Regional		
Party	Candidate	Votes	%	±%	Votes	%	±%
Labour	Christine Gwyther	9,891	35.1	N/A	8,536	30.4	N/A
Plaid Cymru	Roy Llewelyn	8,399	29.8	N/A	9,234	32.9	N/A
Conservative	David G. Edwards	5,079	18.0	N/A	6,032	21.5	N/A
Independent	William E.H.V. Davies	2,090	7.4	N/A			
Liberal Democrats	Roger H. Williams	1,875	6.7	N/A	2,510	8.9	N/A
Independent	Graham T.R. Fry	815	2.9	N/A			
Other list parties					1,791	6.4	N/A
Majority		1,492	5.3	N/A			
Turnout		28,149	50.7	N/A			
Labour win (new seat)							
