= Samuel Kurtz =

Welsh Conservative politician

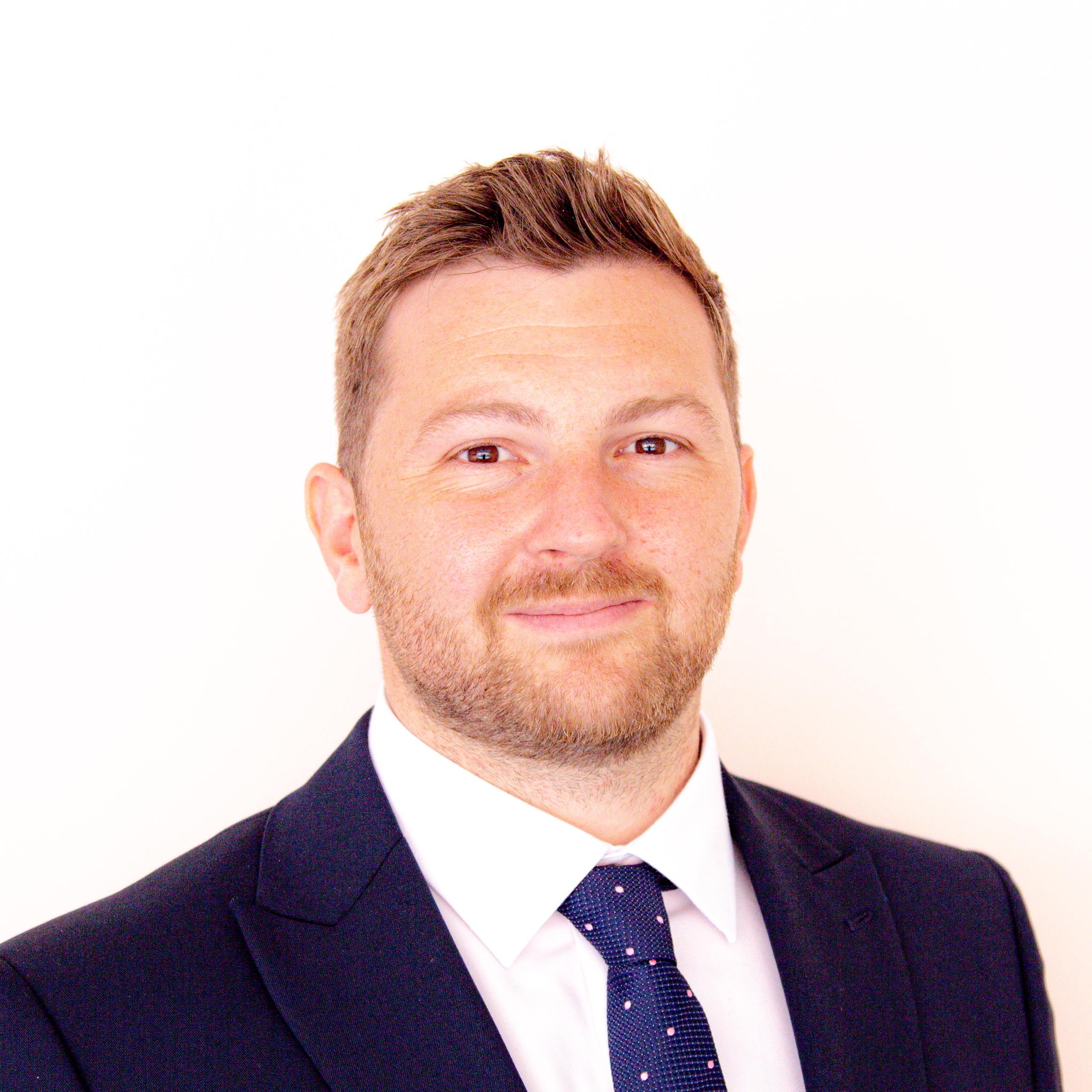
- Kurtz in 2021

Shadow Cabinet Secretary for Economy, Energy and the Welsh Language (Note: As Shadow Minister for Energy and Economy April - December 2024)
- In office 18 April 2024 – 20 January 2026
- Leader: Andrew RT Davies; Darren Millar
- Preceded by: Role Re-organised

Shadow Minister for Rural Affairs and the Welsh Language
- In office 7 May 2021 – 18 April 2024
- Leader: Andrew RT Davies
- Preceded by: Janet Finch-Saunders (Note: as Shadow Minister for Environment, Energy and Rural Affairs)
- Succeeded by: James Evans

Member of the Senedd for Carmarthen West and South Pembrokeshire
- In office 7 May 2021 – 7 April 2026
- Preceded by: Angela Burns
- Succeeded by: Constituency abolished

Pembrokeshire County Councillor for Scleddau Ward
- In office 5 May 2017 – 5 May 2022
- Preceded by: Owen Watkin James
- Succeeded by: Ward Abolished

Personal details
- Born: 1991 or 1992 (age 33–34)
- Party: Welsh Conservatives
- Education: University of the West of England
- Website: www.samuelkurtz.wales

Samuel Kurtz (usually known as Sam Kurtz) is a Welsh Conservative politician who was Member of the Senedd (MS) for Carmarthen West and South Pembrokeshire from 2021 to 2026. He also previously served as a Pembrokeshire County Councillor from 2017 to 2022, representing Scleddau ward.

While a Member of the Senedd, Kurtz held a number of Shadow Cabinet positions, holding the portfolio for Rural Affairs from 2021 to 2024 and Economy and Energy from 2024 to 2026. He retained the portfolio for the Welsh Language for the entirety of his term, except for between April and December 2024.

== Personal life and education ==
Kurtz studied for a BA in Politics at the University of the West of England. He grew up on a beef farm.

Prior to his political career, Kurtz worked for the Pembrokeshire Herald and the Western Telegraph.

== Political career ==
Kurtz was elected to Pembrokeshire County Council in 2017. He represented Scleddau ward until the 2022 elections. The ward was abolished at this election, and split across the Llanrhian and Bro Gwaun wards. He was a press officer for Stephen Crabb in 2020.

Kurtz was selected to replace the outgoing Angela Burns as Welsh Conservative candidate for Carmarthen West and South Pembrokeshire in 2020. Shortly after this, 3 tweets from when he was a student surfaced, in which he described an individual as a "gay boy", said someone "sounds a little gay" and described someone as “bisexual, and looks like shit off of a shoe”. Kurtz apologised for the comments. He was elected as MS for the constituency at the 2021 Senedd elections, with a majority of 936.

From his election until 2024 he was the Welsh Conservatives' Shadow Rural Affairs and Welsh language Minister in the Senedd. Kurtz has been the Conservatives' Shadow Minister for Economy and Energy since April 2024. In December 2024, the Welsh Language was re-added to his portfolio. He is also a member of two Senedd Committees: the Economy, Trade, and Rural Affairs Committee and the Legislation, Justice and Constitution Committee. He is also a member of cross-party groups on armed forces and cadets, beer and pubs, diabetes, digital rights and democracy, fisheries and aquaculture, further education and skills, horseracing, small shops, tourism and welsh wool. He also chairs cross party groupings on rural growth and shooting and conservation.

Kurtz contested the Ceredigion Penfro constituency in the 2026 Senedd election but was not elected.

== Political views ==
=== Wales and The Constitution ===
Kurtz has backed the increase in size of the Senedd, against his party's policy, although he said this should not happen during a cost of living crisis. He further said that "we need to have a look at how the UK is set up" and described the existing constitutional settlement as "a mish mash".

=== Agriculture ===
Kurtz opposes the "Family Farms Tax".

== Notes ==
Senedd
Preceded by Angela Burns	Member of the Senedd for Carmarthen West and South Pembrokeshire; 2021 – 2026	Succeeded by Constituency abolished
