= 2011 National Assembly for Wales election =

- 5 May 2011

All 60 seats to the National Assembly for Wales 31 seats needed for a majority
- Opinion polls
- Turnout: 42.2% ▼1.5%
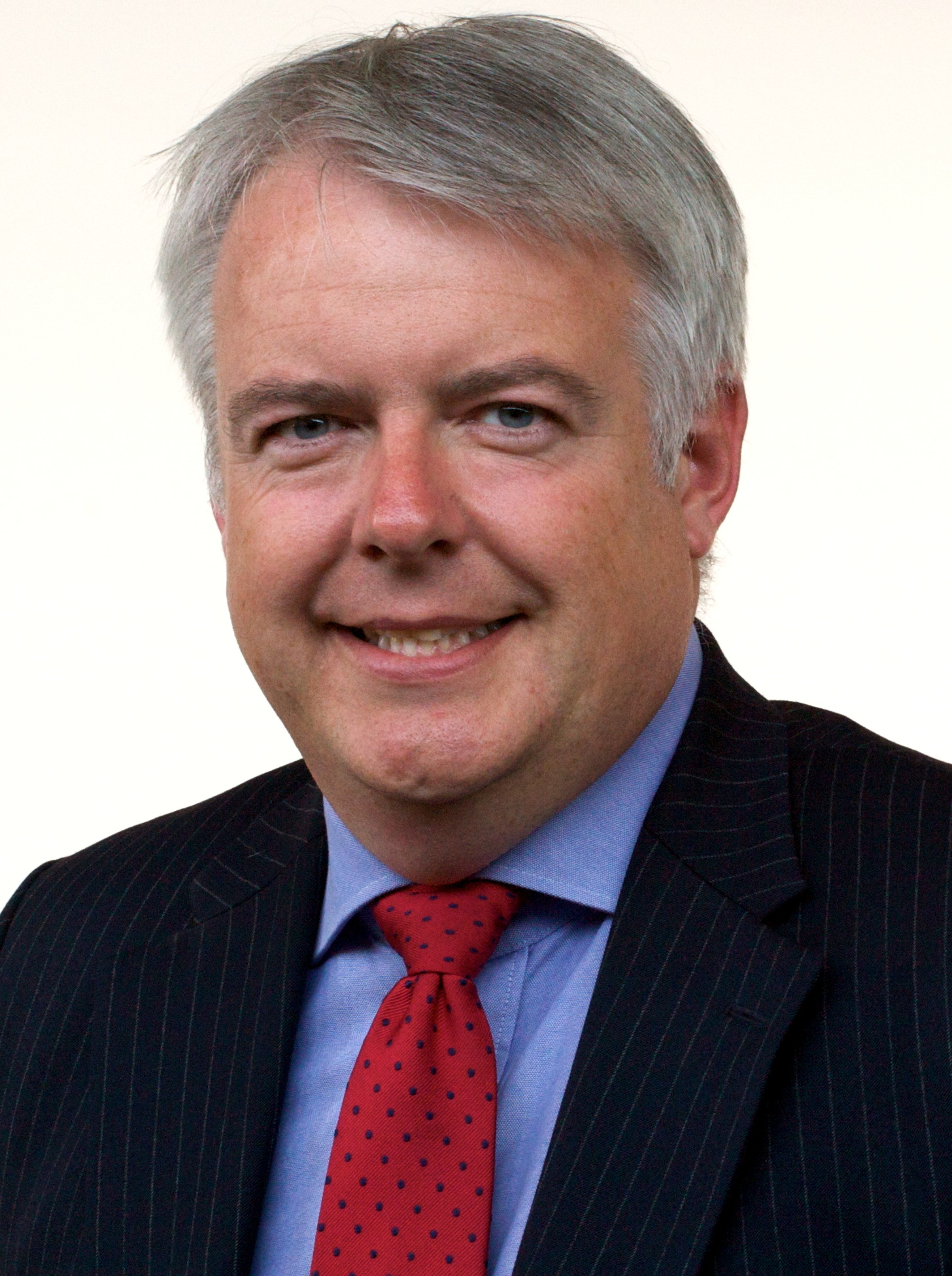

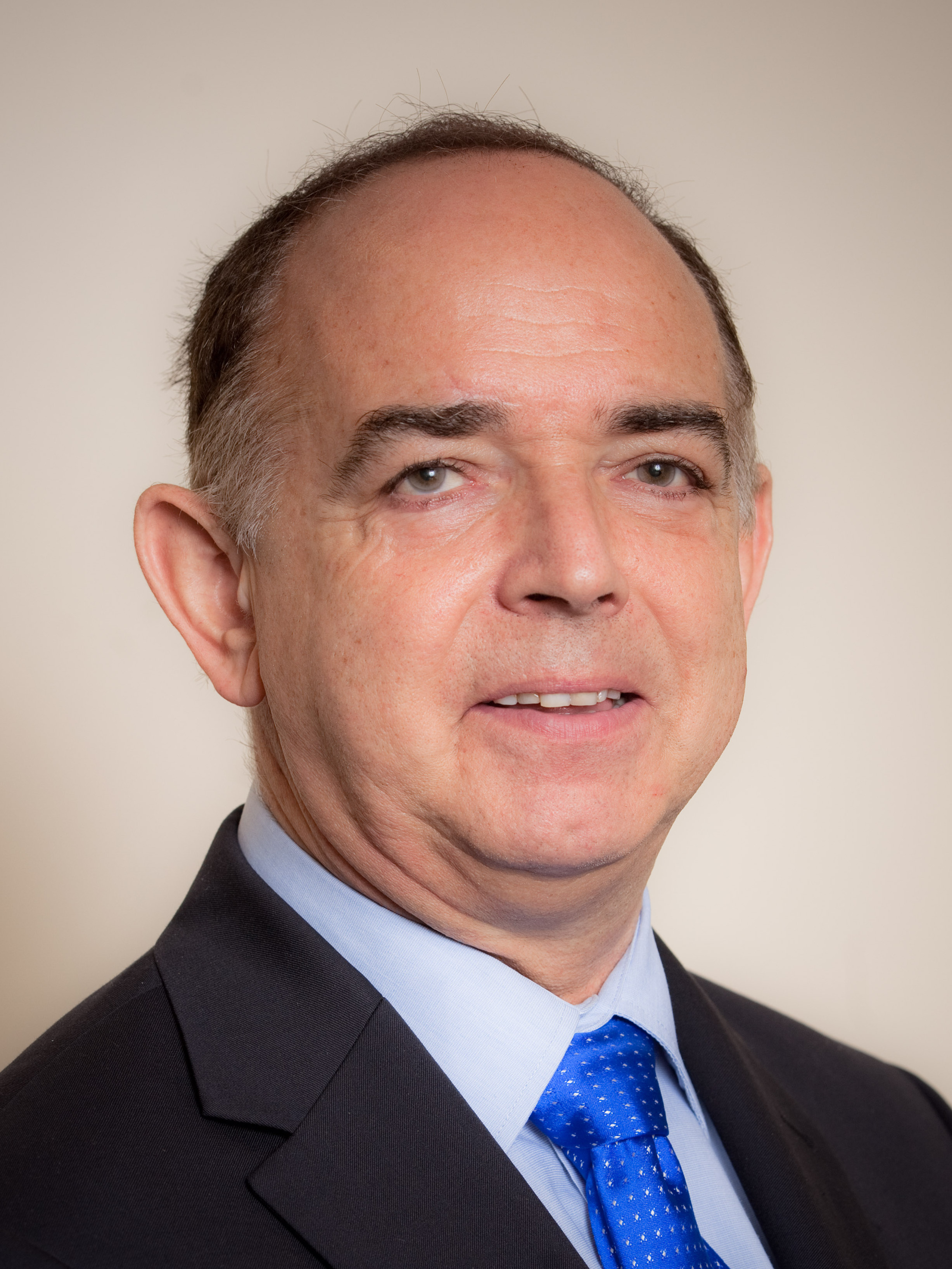

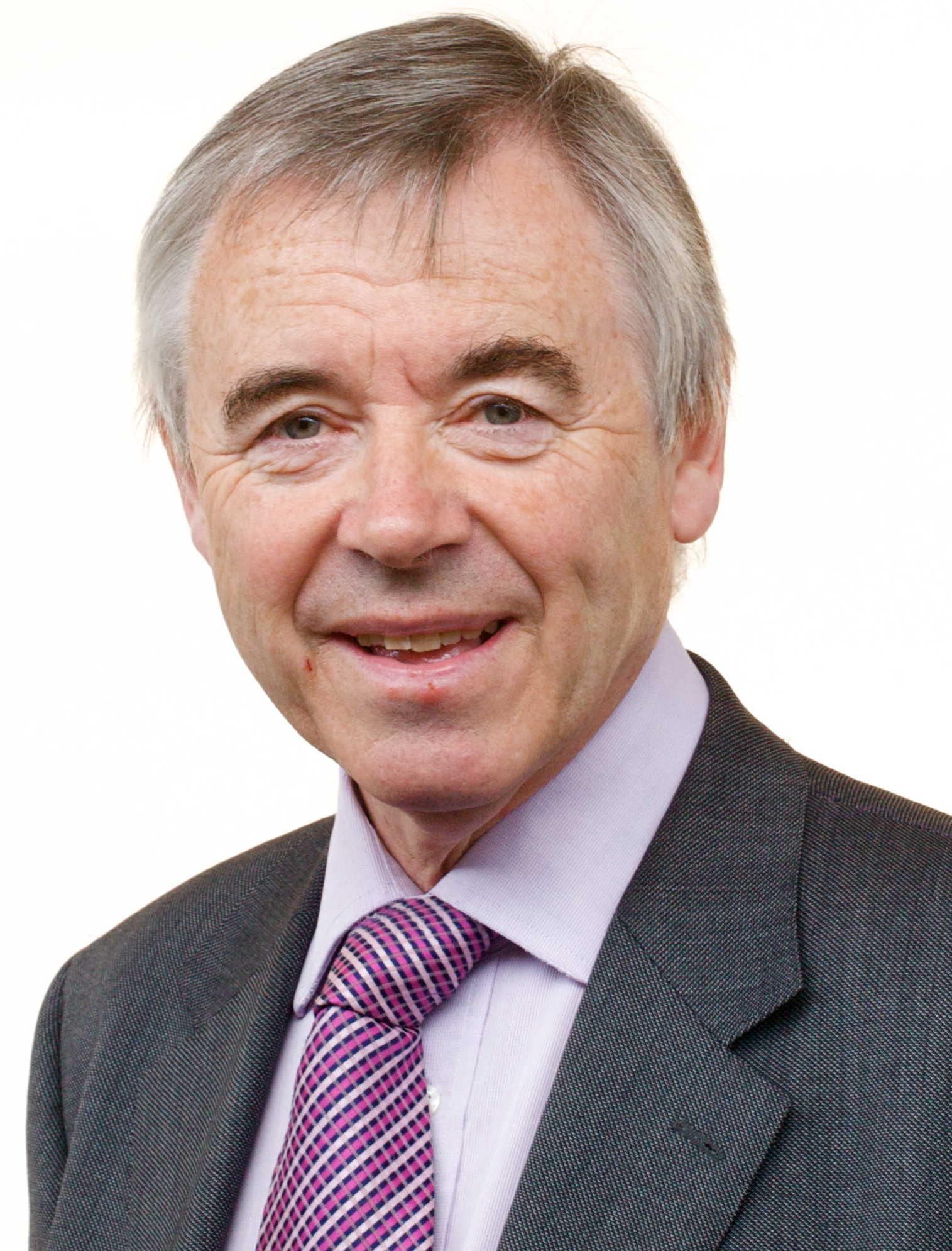

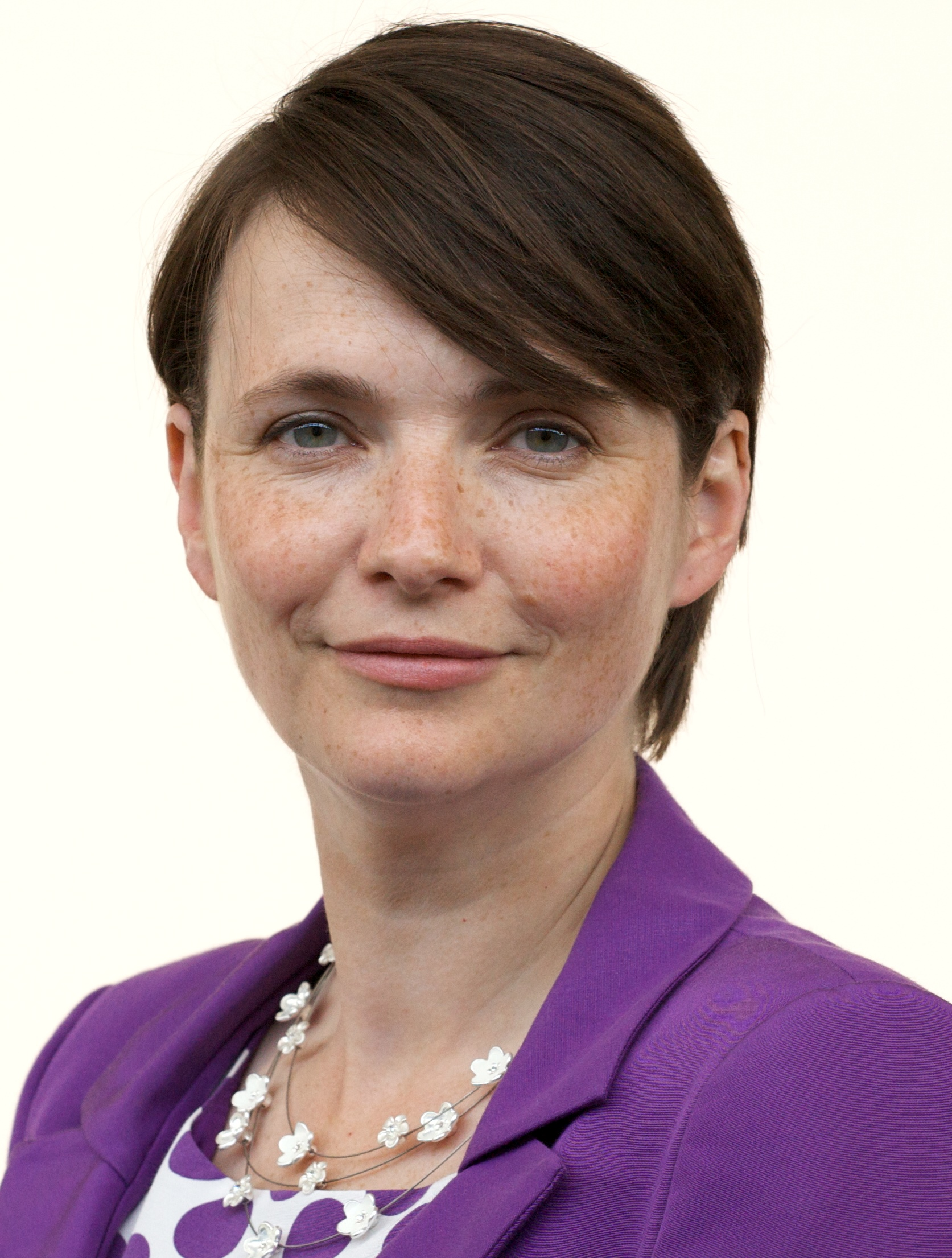
| | First party | Second party |
|---|---|---|
| Leader | Carwyn Jones | Nick Bourne |
| Party | Labour | Conservative |
| Leader since | 1 December 2009 | 18 August 1999 |
| Leader's seat | Bridgend | Mid and West Wales (defeated) (Note: A Conservative gain at the constituency level in Mid and West Wales correspondingly cost the party its entitlement to a seat on the regional list, such that Bourne himself failed to win re-election.) |
| Last election | 26 (Note: Includes 6 AMs sponsored by the Co-operative Party, who are designated Labour and Co-operative.) seats | 12 seats |
| Seats before | 26 | 13 |
| Seats won | 30 (Note: Includes 10 AMs sponsored by the Co-operative Party, who are designated Labour and Co-operative.) | 14 |
| Seat change | ▲4 | ▲2 |
| Constituency Vote | 401,677 | 237,388 |
| % and swing | 42.3% ▲10.1% | 25.0% ▲2.6% |
| Regional Vote | 349,935 | 213,773 |
| % and swing | 36.9% ▲7.3% | 22.5% ▲1.0% |
| | Third party | Fourth party |
| Leader | Ieuan Wyn Jones | Kirsty Williams |
| Party | Plaid Cymru | Liberal Democrats |
| Leader since | 4 August 2000 | 8 December 2008 |
| Leader's seat | Ynys Môn | Brecon and Radnorshire |
| Last election | 15 seats | 6 seats |
| Seats before | 14 | 6 |
| Seats won | 11 | 5 |
| Seat change | ▼4 | ▼1 |
| Constituency Vote | 182,907 | 100,259 |
| % and swing | 19.3% ▼3.1% | 10.6% ▼4.2% |
| Regional Vote | 169,799 | 76,349 |
| % and swing | 17.9% ▼3.1% | 8.0% ▼3.7% |
First Minister before election
Carwyn Jones
Labour
First Minister after election
Carwyn Jones
Labour

An election for the National Assembly for Wales was held on 5 May 2011 and to elect the Assembly Members (AMs). It was the fourth election for seats in the National Assembly for Wales (previous elections having been held in 1999, 2003 and 2007), and the second election taken under the rules of the Government of Wales Act 2006.

The election resulted in gains for the incumbent Welsh Labour, which gained four seats compared to the previous election and now had 30 seats, exactly half of the assembly. The party also secured a swing in its favour of over 10 percentage points. The Welsh Conservatives emerged as the largest opposition party with 14 seats, a net gain of two, but party leader Nick Bourne lost his seat. The junior party in the government coalition, the nationalist Plaid Cymru, suffered a drop in its vote and lost 4 seats. The Welsh Liberal Democrats lost significantly in the popular vote and returned five AMs, a loss of one.

British, Irish, Commonwealth and European Union citizens living in Wales aged eighteen or over on election day were entitled to vote. The deadline to register to vote in the election was midnight on 14 April 2011, though anyone who qualified as an anonymous elector had until midnight on 26 April 2011 to register.

It was held on the same day as elections for Northern Ireland's 26 local councils, the Scottish Parliament and Northern Ireland Assembly elections, a number of local elections in England, and the United Kingdom Alternative Vote referendum.

== Electoral method ==
In general elections for the National Assembly for Wales, each voter has two votes in the so called additional member system for mixed-member proportional representation. The first vote is used to vote for a candidate to become the Assembly Member for the voter's constituency, elected by the 'first past the post' system. The second vote is used to vote for a regional closed party list of candidates. Additional member seats are allocated from the lists by the d'Hondt method, with constituency results being taken into account in the allocation of the regional seats. The overall result is approximately proportional.

== Results ==
- Overall turnout: 42.2%

Welsh Assembly election, 2011
| Parties | Additional member system | | | | | | | | | | Total seats | | |
| Parties | Constituency | | | | | Region | | | | | Total seats | | |
| Parties | Votes | % | +/− | Seats | +/− | Votes | % | +/− | Seats | +/− | Total | +/− | % |
|---|---|---|---|---|---|---|---|---|---|---|---|---|---|
| Labour | 401,677 | 42.3 | +10.1 | 28 | +4 | 349,935 | 36.9 | +7.3 | 2 | ±0 | 30 (Note: Includes 10 AMs sponsored by the Co-operative Party, who are designated Labour and Co-operative.) | +4 | 50.0 |
| Conservative | 237,388 | 25.0 | +2.6 | 6 | +1 | 213,773 | 22.5 | +1.0 | 8 | +1 | 14 | +2 | 23.3 |
| Plaid Cymru | 182,907 | 19.3 | –3.1 | 5 | –2 | 169,799 | 17.9 | –3.1 | 6 | –2 | 11 | –4 | 18.3 |
| Liberal Democrats | 100,259 | 10.6 | –4.2 | 1 | –2 | 76,349 | 8.0 | −3.7 | 4 | +1 | 5 | –1 | 8.3 |
| UKIP | N/A | N/A | N/A | 0 | 0 | 43,256 | 4.6 | +0.7 | 0 | 0 | 0 | 0 | 0.0 |
| Green | 1,514 | 0.2 | N/A | 0 | 0 | 32,649 | 3.4 | -0.1 | 0 | 0 | 0 | 0 | 0.0 |
| Socialist Labour | N/A | N/A | N/A | 0 | 0 | 23,020 | 2.4 | +1.1 | 0 | 0 | 0 | 0 | 0.0 |
| BNP | 7,056 | 0.7 | N/A | 0 | 0 | 22,610 | 2.4 | –1.9 | 0 | 0 | 0 | 0 | 0.0 |
| Welsh Christian | N/A | N/A | N/A | 0 | 0 | 8,947 | 0.9 | ±0.0 | 0 | 0 | 0 | 0 | 0.0 |
| Communist | N/A | N/A | N/A | 0 | 0 | 2,676 | 0.3 | -0.1 | 0 | 0 | 0 | 0 | 0.0 |
| English Democrat | 744 | 0.1 | –0.1 | 0 | 0 | 1,904 | 0.2 | ±0.0 | 0 | 0 | 0 | 0 | 0.0 |
| TUSC | N/A | N/A | N/A | 0 | 0 | 1,639 | 0.2 | N/A | 0 | 0 | 0 | 0 | 0.0 |
| Monster Raving Loony | N/A | N/A | N/A | 0 | 0 | 1,237 | 0.1 | N/A | 0 | 0 | 0 | 0 | 0.0 |
| Independent | 12,478 | 1.3 | –1.1 | 0 | –1 | 1,094 | 0.1 | –0.9 | 0 | 0 | 0 | –1 | 0.0 |
| Llais Gwynedd | 3,225 | 0.3 | N/A | 0 | 0 | N/A | N/A | N/A | 0 | 0 | 0 | 0 | 0.0 |
| Putting Llanelli First | 2,004 | 0.2 | N/A | 0 | 0 | N/A | N/A | N/A | 0 | 0 | 0 | 0 | 0.0 |
| Total | 949,252 | | | 40 | | 949,388 | | | 20 | | 60 | | |

(source:)

=== Votes summary ===
Popular vote
| Labour | 36.90% |
| Conservative | 22.50% |
| Plaid Cymru | 17.90% |
| Liberal Democrats | 8.00% |
| UKIP | 4.60% |
| Green | 3.40% |
| Socialist Labour | 2.40% |
| BNP | 2.40% |
| Other | 1.90% |

Parliament seats
| Labour | 50.00% |
| Conservative | 23.33% |
| Plaid Cymru | 18.33% |
| Liberal Democrats | 8.33% |

== Opinion polls ==
=== Constituency vote (FPTP) ===
| Date(s) conducted | Polling organisation/client | Lab | Cons | Plaid | Lib Dem | Others | Lead |
|---|---|---|---|---|---|---|---|
| 5 May 2011 | Welsh Assembly election results, 2011 | 42.3% | 25.0% | 19.3% | 10.6% | 2.8% | 17.3% |
| 4 May 2011 | YouGov/ITV Wales | 47% | 20% | 18% | 9% | 6% | 27% |
| 2 May 2011 | YouGov/ITV Wales | 45% | 21% | 18% | 8% | 7% | 24% |
| 14 April 2011 | YouGov/ITV Wales | 49% | 20% | 17% | 8% | 6% | 29% |
| 7 April 2011 | rmg:Clarity/Western Mail | 51% | 20% | 17% | 8% | 5% | 31% |
| 30 March 2011 | YouGov/ITV Wales | 47% | 21% | 17% | 8% | 6% | 26% |
| 8 March 2011 | YouGov/ITV Wales | 48% | 20% | 19% | 7% | 7% | 28% |
| 26 January 2011 | YouGov/ITV Wales | 45% | 21% | 21% | 7% | 6% | 24% |
| 22 December 2010 | YouGov/ITV Wales | 44% | 23% | 21% | 6% | 6% | 21% |
| 24 November 2010 | YouGov/ITV Wales | 44% | 21% | 21% | 9% | 6% | 23% |
| 27 November 2010 | YouGov/ITV Wales | 44% | 19% | 21% | 9% | 8% | 23% |
| 3 May 2007 | 2007 National Assembly for Wales election | 32.2% | 22.4% | 22.4% | 14.8% | 8.2% | 9.8% |

=== Regional vote (AMS) ===
| Date(s) conducted | Polling organisation/client | Lab | Cons | Plaid | Lib Dem | UKIP | Green | Others | Lead |
|---|---|---|---|---|---|---|---|---|---|
| 5 May 2011 | Welsh Assembly election results, 2011 (regional) | 36.9% | 22.5% | 17.9% | 8.0% | 4.6% | 3.4% | 6.7% | 14.4% |
| 14 April 2011 | YouGov/ITV Wales | 44% | 20% | 18% | 8% | 4% | 2% | 4% | 24% |
| 30 March 2011 | YouGov/ITV Wales | 45% | 20% | 16% | 8% | 6% | 2% | 2% | 25% |
| 8 March 2011 | YouGov/ITV Wales | 45% | 20% | 18% | 5% | 5% | 4% | 2% | 25% |
| 26 January 2011 | YouGov/ITV Wales | 41% | 20% | 21% | 8% | 4% | 2% | 4% | 20% |
| 22 December 2010 | YouGov/ITV Wales | 42% | 22% | 21% | 5% | 5% | 3% | 2% | 20% |
| 24 November 2010 | YouGov/ITV Wales | 41% | 20% | 20% | 9% | 4% | 3% | 4% | 21% |
| 27 October 2010 | YouGov/ITV Wales | 40% | 18% | 23% | 9% | 6% | 2% | 3% | 17% |
| 27 October 2010 | YouGov/ITV Wales | 40% | 18% | 23% | 9% | 6% | 2% | 3% | 17% |
| 3 May 2007 | National Assembly for Wales election, 2007 (regional) | 29.6% | 21.4% | 21.0% | 11.7% | 4.0% | 3.5% | 8.8% | 8.2% |

== Constituency and regional summary ==
=== Constituency nominations ===
NB: candidates in bold text were the incumbent assembly members. Non-incumbents are represented in italics. Members elected in 2011 are highlighted with party colours.

| Constituency | Conservative | Labour | Liberal Democrats | Plaid Cymru | Others | Result |
|---|---|---|---|---|---|---|
| Aberavon | TJ Morgan | David Rees | Helen Ceri Clarke | Paul Nicholls Jones | | Labour hold |
| Aberconwy | Janet Finch-Saunders | Eifion Wyn Williams | Mike Priestley | Iwan Huws | | **Conservative gain** |
| Alyn and Deeside | John Bell | **Carl Sargeant** | Peter Williams | Shane Brennan | Mike Whitby (British National Party) | Labour hold |
| Arfon | Aled Davies | Christina Rees | Rhys Jones | **Alun Ffred Jones** | | Plaid Cymru hold |
| Blaenau Gwent | Bob Haywood | Alun Davies | Martin Blakebrough | Darren Jones | Jayne Sullivan (Independent); Brian Urch (British National Party) | **Labour gain** |
| Brecon and Radnorshire | Chris Davies | Chris Lloyd | **Kirsty Williams** | Gary Price | | LD hold |
| Bridgend | Alex Williams | **Carwyn Jones** | Briony Davies | Tim Thomas | | Labour hold |
| Caerphilly | Owen Meredith | **Jeff Cuthbert** | Kay David | Ron Davies | Anthony King (British National Party) | Labour hold |
| Cardiff Central | Matt Smith | Jenny Rathbone | Nigel Howells | Chris Williams | Mathab Khan (Independent) | **Labour gain** |
| Cardiff North | **Jonathan Morgan** | Julie Morgan | Matt Smith | Ben Foday | | **Labour gain** |
| Cardiff South and Penarth | Ben Gray | Vaughan Gething | Sian Anne Cliff | Liz Musa | | Labour hold |
| Cardiff West | Craig Williams | Mark Drakeford | David Morgan | Neil McEvoy | | Labour hold |
| Carmarthen East and Dinefwr | Henrietta Hensher | Antony Jones | Will Griffiths | **Rhodri Glyn Thomas** | | Plaid Cymru hold |
| Carmarthen West and South Pembrokeshire | **Angela Burns** | Christine Gwyther | Selwyn Runnett | Nerys Evans | | Conservative hold |
| Ceredigion | Luke Evetts | Richard Boudier | Elizabeth Evans | **Elin Jones** | Chris Simpson (Welsh Green Party) | Plaid Cymru hold |
| Clwyd South | Paul Rogers | Ken Skates | Bruce Roberts | Mabon ap Gwynfor | | Labour hold |
| Clwyd West | **Darren Millar** | Crispin Jones | Brian Cossey | Eifion Lloyd Jones | | Conservative hold |
| Cynon Valley | Daniel Saxton | **Christine Chapman** | Ian Walton | Dafydd Trystan Davies | | Labour hold |
| Delyn | Matthew Wright | **Sandy Mewies** | Michele Jones | Carrie Harper | | Labour hold |
| Dwyfor Meirionnydd | Simon Baynes | Martyn Singleton | Steve Churchman | **Lord Elis-Thomas** | Louise Hughes (Llais Gwynedd) | Plaid Cymru hold |
| Gower | Caroline Jones | **Edwina Hart** | Peter May | Darren Price | | Labour hold |
| Islwyn | David Chipp | Gwyn Price | Tom Sullivan | Steffan Lewis | Peter Whalley (British National Party) | Labour hold |
| Llanelli | Andrew Morgan | Keith Davies | Cheryl Philpott | **Helen Mary Jones** | Sian Caiach (Putting Llanelli First) | **Labour gain** |
| Merthyr Tydfil and Rhymney | Chris O'Brien | **Huw Lewis** | Amy Kitcher | Noel Turner | Tony Rogers (Independent) | Labour hold |
| Monmouth | **Nick Ramsay** | Mark Whitcutt | Janet Ellard | Fiona Cross | Steve Uncles (English Democrats) | Conservative hold |
| Montgomeryshire | Russell George | Nick Colbourne | Wyn Williams | David Senior | | **Conservative gain** |
| Neath | Alex Powell | **Gwenda Thomas** | Matthew McCarthy | Alun Llewellyn | Mike Green (British National Party) | Labour hold |
| Newport East | Nick Webb | **John Griffiths** | Ed Townsend | Chris Paul | | Labour hold |
| Newport West | David Williams | **Rosemary Butler** | Elizabeth Newton | Lyndon Binding | | Labour hold |
| Ogmore | Martyn Hughes | **Janice Gregory** | Gerald Francis | Danny Clark | | Labour hold |
| Pontypridd | Joel James | Mick Antoniw | Mike Powell | Ioan Bellin | Ken Owen (Independent) | Labour hold |
| Preseli Pembrokeshire | **Paul Davies** | Terry Mills | Bob Kilmister | Rhys Sinnett | | Conservative hold |
| Rhondda | James Eric Jefferys | **Leighton Andrews** | George Summers | Sera Evans-Fear | | Labour hold |
| Swansea East | Dan Boucher | Michael Hedges | Sam Samuel | Dic Jones | Joanne Shannon (British National Party) | Labour hold |
| Swansea West | Stephen Jenkins | Julie James | Rob Speht | Carl Harris | | Labour hold |
| Torfaen | Natasha Asghar | **Lynne Neagle** | Will Griffiths | Jeff Rees | Susan Harwood (British National Party); Elizabeth Haynes (Independent) | Labour hold |
| Vale of Clwyd | Ian Gunning | **Ann Jones** | Heather Prydderch | Alun Lloyd Jones | | Labour hold |
| Vale of Glamorgan | Angela Jones-Evans | **Jane Hutt** | Damian Chick | Ian Johnson | | Labour hold |
| Wrexham | John Marek | **Lesley Griffiths** | Bill Brereton | Marc Jones | | Labour hold |
| Ynys Môn | Paul Williams | Joe Lock | Rhys Taylor | **Ieuan Wyn Jones** | | Plaid Cymru hold |

=== Regional lists ===
==== Mid and West Wales ====
National Assembly election 2011: Mid and West Wales
| List | Candidates | Votes | Of total (%) | ± from prev. |
|---|---|---|---|---|
| Plaid Cymru | **Simon Thomas** Rhys Davies, Llywelyn Rees, Ellen ap Gwynn | 56,384 | 26.7 | −4.3 |
| Conservative | Nick Bourne, Lisa Francis, Ian Harrison, Gareth Ratcliffe, Keith Evans, Stephen Kaye, Dan Munford, Evan Price | 52,905 | 25.1 | +2.2 |
| Labour | **Joyce Watson** Rebecca Evans Matthew Dorrance, Iqbal Malik | 47,348 | 22.5 | +4.0 |
| Liberal Democrats | **William Powell** Mark Cole, Edward Wilson, Steffan John, Gemma Bowker | 26,847 | 12.7 | −0.5 |
| UKIP | Christine Williams, Clive Easton, David Rowlands, Nick Powell | 9,711 | 4.6 | +0.8 |
| Green | Leila Kiersch, Marilyn Elson, Pat McCarthy, Neil Lewis, Ken Simpkin, Rachael Sweeting | 8,660 | 4.1 | +0.1 |
| Socialist Labour | Liz Screen, Adam Kelsey, Barry Goldings, Robert Board | 3,951 | 1.9 | +0.9 |
| BNP | Kay Thomas, Watcyn Richards, Roger Phillips, Gary Tumulty | 2,821 | 1.3 | −1.6 |
| Welsh Christian | Jeff Green, Adam Bridgman, Martin Wiltshire, Sue Green | 1,630 | 0.8 | +0.1 |
| Communist | Catrin Ashton, Rick Newnham, Barbara Thomas, Clive Eliassen | 595 | 0.3 | N/A |
| Turnout | | 210,852 | | −1.4 |

==== North Wales ====
National Assembly election 2011: North Wales
| List | Candidates | Votes | Of total (%) | ± from prev. |
|---|---|---|---|---|
| Labour | Gwyneth Thomas, David Phillips, Diane Green, Colin Hughes | 62,677 | 32.2 | +5.8 |
| Conservative | **Mark Isherwood, Antoinette Sandbach** Janet Haworth, Julian Thompson-Hall, Ranil Jayawardena, Samantha Cotton, Martin Peet, Sam Rowlands, John Broughton | 52,201 | 26.8 | +1.2 |
| Plaid Cymru | **Llyr Huws Griffiths** Heledd Fychan, Dyfed Edwards, Liz Saville Roberts | 41,701 | 21.4 | −4.3 |
| Liberal Democrats | **Aled Roberts** Eleanor Burnham, Mark Young, Anne Williams, Victor Babu | 11,507 | 5.9 | −1.9 |
| UKIP | Nathan Gill, Warwick Nicholson, Andrew Haigh, Elwyn Williams | 9,608 | 4.9 | +0.9 |
| Socialist Labour | Katherine Jones, David Jones, Robert English, John Mcleod | 4,895 | 2.5 | +1.4 |
| BNP | John Walker, Richard Barnes, Ian Si'Ree, Clive Jefferson | 4,785 | 2.5 | −2.6 |
| Green | Dorienne Robinson, Timothy Foster, Peter Haig, Ann Were | 4,406 | 2.3 | −0.6 |
| Welsh Christian | Ralph Kinch, Louise Wynne-Jones, Lindsay Griffiths, Neil Bastow | 1,401 | 0.7 | +0.1 |
| Independent | Jason Weyman | 1,094 | 0.6 | N/A |
| Communist | Glyn Davies, Trevor Jones, Rhia Cartwright, Graham Morgan | 523 | 0.3 | −0.1 |
| Turnout | | 194,798 | | −0.3 |

==== South Wales Central ====
National Assembly election 2011: South Wales Central
| List | Candidates | Votes | Of total (%) | ± from prev. |
|---|---|---|---|---|
| Labour | Jane Brencher, Craig Jones, Alex Thomas, John David Drysdale | 85,445 | 41.0 | +7.0 |
| Conservative | **Andrew R.T. Davies, David Melding** Lyn Hudson, Richard Hopkins, Christopher Williams, Kyle Smith, Axel Kaehne, Helen Hancock | 47,751 | 22 | +0.3 |
| Plaid Cymru | **Leanne Wood** Chris Franks, Delme Bowen, Richard Grigg | 28,606 | 13.7 | −1.7 |
| Liberal Democrats | **John Dixon** Eluned Parrott, Rachael Hitchinson, Elgan Morgan, Andrew Sherwood | 16,514 | 7.9 | −6.1 |
| Green | Jake Griffiths, Sam Coates, John Matthews, Matt Townsend, Teleri Clark | 10,774 | 5.2 | +1.4 |
| UKIP | Kevin Mahoney, Simon Zeigler, Lawrence Gwynn, Anthony Jenkins | 8,292 | 4.0 | +0.3 |
| Socialist Labour | Andrew Jordan, Adrian Dumphy, Diana Whitley-Jones, Harry Parfitt | 4,690 | 2.3 | +1.4 |
| BNP | Gareth Connors, Mary John, Keith Fairhurst, Edward O'Sullivan | 3,805 | 1.8 | −2.0 |
| Welsh Christian | John Harrold, Clive Bate, Donald Watson, Derek Thomson | 1,873 | 0.9 | −0.1 |
| Monster Raving Loony | Mark Beech, Pinkandorevil Gem | 1,237 | 0.6 | N/A |
| TUSC | Ross Saunders, Sarah Mayo, Brian Lewis, Helen Jones, Andrew Price, Filipa Machado, Leanne Francis, Rae Lewis-Ayling, Nagina Kabul, Glyn Matthews, Keiron Hopkins, Rowena Mason | 830 | 0.4 | N/A |
| Communist | Mark Beech, Pinkandorevil Gem | 516 | 0.2 | −0.1 |
| Turnout | | 208,333 | | |

==== South Wales East ====
National Assembly election 2011: South Wales East
| List | Candidates | Votes | Of total (%) | ± from prev. |
|---|---|---|---|---|
| Labour | Debbie Wilcox, Anthony Hunt, Karen Wilkie, Hefin David | 82,699 | 45.7 | +9.9 |
| Conservative | **William Graham, Mohammad Asghar** Caroline Oag, Benjamin Smith, Paul Pavia, Susannah Beatson-Hird, Paul Williams, Paul Stafford | 35,459 | 19.6 | −0.4 |
| Plaid Cymru | **Jocelyn Davies, Lindsay Whittle** Bleddyn Hancock, Jonathan Clark | 21,850 | 12.1 | −1.6 |
| Liberal Democrats | Veronica German, Phil Hobson, Bob Griffin, Alison Willott, Brendan D'Cruz | 10,798 | 6.0 | −5.1 |
| UKIP | David Rowlands, Neil (Jock) Greer, Peter Osbourne, Gareth Dunn | 9,526 | 5.3 | +0.7 |
| BNP | Laurence Reid, Jennie Noble, John Voisey, Jennifer Matthys | 6,485 | 3.6 | −1.1 |
| Green | Christopher Were, Pippa Bartolotti, Owen Clarke, Alan Williams | 4,857 | 2.7 | −0.2 |
| Socialist Labour | Alyson O'Connell, Susan Deare, Alan Cowdell, Joyce Giblin | 4,427 | 2.4 | +0.5 |
| Welsh Christian | Dave Owen, Steve McCreery, Raphael Martin, Tracey Martin | 2,411 | 1.3 | +0.0 |
| English Democrat | Laurence Williams, Kim Burellli, Robin Tilbrook, Teresa Canon, Mike Tibby | 1,904 | 1.1 | +0.2 |
| Communist | Tommy Roberts, Roy Evans, Julian Jones, Angharad Khan-Raja | 578 | 0.3 | −0.2 |
| Turnout | | 181,024 | | |

==== South Wales West ====
National Assembly election 2011: South Wales West
| List | Candidates | Votes | Of total (%) | ± from prev. |
|---|---|---|---|---|
| Labour | Alana Davies, Geraint Hopkins, Marie John, Edward Jones | 71,766 | 46.5 | +10.7 |
| Conservative | Suzy Davies, Byron Davies, Altaf Hussain, Helen Baker, Matthew Voisey, Steve Gallagher, Dayne Powell, Gareth Williams | 27,457 | 17.8 | +1.7 |
| Plaid Cymru | **Bethan Jenkins** David Lloyd, Myfanwy Davies, Linet Purcell | 21,258 | 13.8 | −3.9 |
| Liberal Democrats | **Peter Black** Stuart Rice, Cheryl Green, Wayne Morgan, Frank Little | 10,683 | 6.9 | −5.5 |
| UKIP | David Bevan, John Atkinson, Tim Jenkins, David Rodgers | 6,619 | 4.3 | +0.7 |
| Socialist Labour | David Davies, Derek Isaacs, Shangara Bhatoe, Ranjit Bhatoe | 5,057 | 3.3 | +1.8 |
| BNP | Laurence Reid, Jennie Noble, John Voisey, Jennifer Matthys | 4,714 | 3.1 | −2.5 |
| Green | Keith Ross, Huw Evans, Delyth Miller, Andrew Chyba | 3,952 | 2.6 | −1.2 |
| Welsh Christian | David Griffiths, Dick Van Steenis, Maggie Harrold, Ray Bridgman | 1,602 | 1.0 | +0.0 |
| TUSC | Ronnie Job, Owen Herbert, Mark Evans, Les Woodward, Claire Job, Alec Thraves, Caroline Butchers, Dave Phillips, Helen Shaw, Martin White, Rob Williams, Rob Owen | 809 | 0.5 | +0.0 |
| Communist | John Morrisey, Laura Picard, David Brown, Dan Cole | 464 | 0.3 | −00 |
| Turnout | | 154,381 | | −2.2 |

== Target seats for the main parties ==
Below are listed all the constituencies which required a swing of less than 7.5% from the 2007 result to change hands.

=== Labour targets ===
| Rank | Constituency | Winning party 2007 | Swing to gain | Labour's place 2007 | Result |
|---|---|---|---|---|---|
| 1 | Carmarthen West & South Pembrokeshire | Conservative | 0.17 | 2nd | Conservative hold |
| 2 | Clwyd West | Conservative | 3.05 | 2nd | Conservative hold |
| 3 | Preseli Pembrokeshire | Conservative | 5.58 | 2nd | Conservative hold |
| 4 | Llanelli | Plaid Cymru | 7.04 | 2nd | Labour gain |
| 5 | Cardiff North | Conservative | 7.19 | 2nd | Labour gain |

=== Plaid Cymru targets ===
| Rank | Constituency | Winning party 2007 | Swing to gain | PC's place 2007 | Result |
|---|---|---|---|---|---|
| 1 | Carmarthen West & South Pembrokeshire | Conservative | 0.44 | 3rd | Conservative hold |
| 2 | Clwyd West | Conservative | 3.33 | 3rd | Conservative hold |
| 3 | Neath | Labour | 3.36 | 2nd | Labour hold |
| 4 | Caerphilly | Labour | 4.38 | 2nd | Labour hold |
| 5 | Preseli Pembrokeshire | Conservative | 6.92 | 3rd | Conservative hold |

=== Conservative targets ===
| Rank | Constituency | Winning party 2007 | Swing to gain | Con's place 2007 | Result |
|---|---|---|---|---|---|
| 1 | Vale of Glamorgan | Labour | 0.13 | 2nd | Labour hold |
| 2 | Vale of Clwyd | Labour | 0.21 | 2nd | Labour hold |
| 3 | Delyn | Labour | 1.18 | 2nd | Labour hold |
| 4 | Gower | Labour | 2.17 | 2nd | Labour hold |
| 5 | Clwyd South | Labour | 2.87 | 2nd | Labour hold |
| 6 | Newport West | Labour | 2.96 | 2nd | Labour hold |
| 7 | Aberconwy | Plaid Cymru | 4.09 | 2nd | Conservative gain |
| 8 | Montgomeryshire | Liberal Democrats | 4.44 | 2nd | Conservative gain |
| 9 | Newport East | Labour | 4.73 | 3rd | Labour hold |
| 10 | Cardiff South & Penarth | Labour | 5.15 | 2nd | Labour hold |
| 11 | Bridgend | Labour | 5.21 | 2nd | Labour hold |
| 12 | Wrexham | Labour | 5.78 | 3rd | Labour hold |
| 13 | Swansea West | Labour | 6.58 | 3rd | Labour hold |
| 14 | Cardiff West | Labour | 6.88 | 2nd | Labour hold |

=== Liberal Democrat targets ===
| Rank | Constituency | Winning party 2007 | Swing to gain | LD's place 2007 | Result |
|---|---|---|---|---|---|
| 1 | Newport East | Labour | 2.20 | 2nd | Labour hold |
| 2 | Swansea West | Labour | 3.30 | 2nd | Labour hold |
| 3 | Wrexham | Labour | 6.05 | 4th | Labour hold |
| 4 | Ceredigion | Plaid Cymru | 6.57 | 2nd | Plaid Cymru hold |
| 5 | Pontypridd | Labour | 7.11 | 2nd | Labour hold |

== New members ==
23 of the members elected to the assembly in the election were not members of the previous Assembly.

- Mick Antoniw, Labour Co-op, Pontypridd
- Byron Davies, Conservative, South Wales West electoral region
- Keith Davies, Labour Co-op, Llanelli
- Suzy Davies, Conservative, South Wales West electoral region
- Mark Drakeford, Labour, Cardiff West
- Rebecca Evans, Labour Co-op, Mid and West Wales electoral region
- Janet Finch-Saunders, Conservative, Aberconwy
- Russell George, Conservative, Montgomeryshire
- Vaughan Gething, Labour Co-op, Cardiff South and Penarth
- Llyr Huws Gruffydd, Plaid Cymru, North Wales electoral region
- Michael Hedges, Labour, Swansea East
- Julie James, Labour, Swansea West
- Julie Morgan, Labour, Cardiff North
- Eluned Parrott, Liberal Democrat, South Wales Central electoral region
- William Powell, Liberal Democrat, Mid and West Wales electoral region
- Gwyn Price, Labour, Islwyn
- Jenny Rathbone, Labour, Cardiff Central
- David Rees, Labour, Aberavon
- Aled Roberts, Liberal Democrat, North Wales electoral region (see below)
- Antoinette Sandbach, Conservative, North Wales electoral region
- Ken Skates, Labour, Clwyd South
- Simon Thomas, Plaid Cymru, Mid and West Wales electoral region
- Lindsay Whittle, Plaid Cymru, South Wales East electoral region

On 17 May it was discovered that two of the newly elected AMs, John Dixon and Aled Roberts, held posts which disqualified them from election to the assembly. Although they had formally taken their seats at the first meeting on 11 May, they were then removed from membership of the Assembly. Both resigned the posts which had given rise to the disqualification. After taking legal advice, the Presiding Officer Rosemary Butler was told that she must formally declare their seats vacant on Friday 27 May, which would mean the candidates placed second on the list being elected unless motions were tabled to reinstate the two. Motions to reinstate Dixon and Roberts were subsequently tabled, and the Assembly Commission issued a press statement explaining the legal situation as they saw it.

The Liberal Democrats withdrew the motion to reinstate John Dixon on 5 July 2011, after the assembly standards commissioner Gerard Elias QC made clear that he had failed to take notice of the relevant rules. On 6 July, Eluned Parrott was sworn in as an AM in his place, and the Assembly voted to readmit Aled Roberts, as evidence showed that he had been directed to out-of-date information in Welsh.

== Defeated members ==
Eight incumbent AMs were defeated at the polls.

- Eleanor Burnham, Liberal Democrat, North Wales electoral region
- Nick Bourne, Conservative, Mid and West Wales electoral region
- Nerys Evans, Plaid Cymru, Mid and West Wales electoral region
- Chris Franks, Plaid Cymru, South Wales Central electoral region
- Veronica German, Liberal Democrat, South Wales East electoral region
- Helen Mary Jones, Plaid Cymru, Llanelli
- Dai Lloyd, Plaid Cymru, South Wales West electoral region
- Jonathan Morgan, Conservative, Cardiff North

== Retiring members ==
The following incumbent AMs did not offer themselves for re-election:

- Lorraine Barrett, Labour Co-op, Cardiff South and Penarth
- Mick Bates, Independent (elected Liberal Democrat), Montgomeryshire
- Alun Cairns, Conservative, South Wales West electoral region
- Jane Davidson, Labour, Pontypridd
- Andrew Davies, Labour, Swansea West
- Brian Gibbons, Labour, Aberavon
- Irene James, Labour, Islwyn
- Gareth Jones, Plaid Cymru, Aberconwy
- Trish Law, Independent, Blaenau Gwent
- Val Lloyd, Labour, Swansea East
- Rhodri Morgan, Labour, Cardiff West
- Jenny Randerson, Liberal Democrat, Cardiff Central
- Janet Ryder, Plaid Cymru, North Wales electoral region
- Karen Sinclair, Labour, Clwyd South
- Brynle Williams, Conservative, North Wales electoral region (died 1 April 2011).

== See also ==
- 2011 Scottish Parliament election
- 2011 Northern Ireland Assembly election
