= 2007 National Assembly for Wales election =

- 3 May 2007

All 60 seats to the National Assembly for Wales 31 seats needed for a majority
- Turnout: 43.7% ▲5.5%
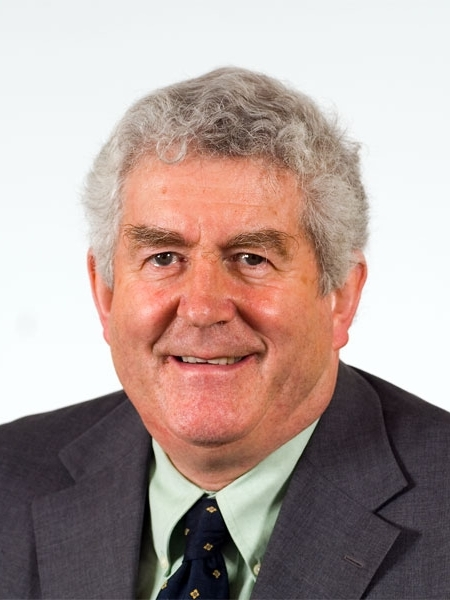

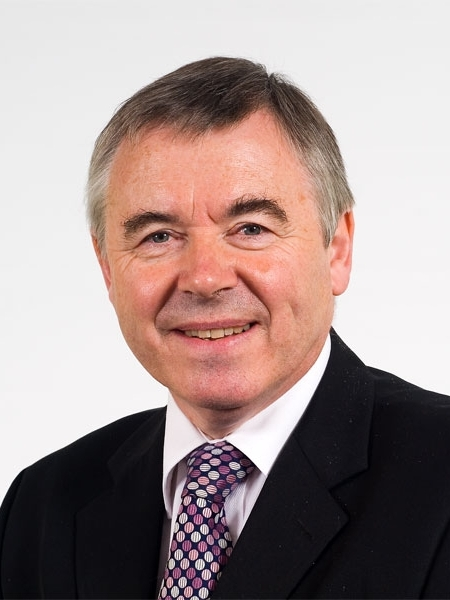

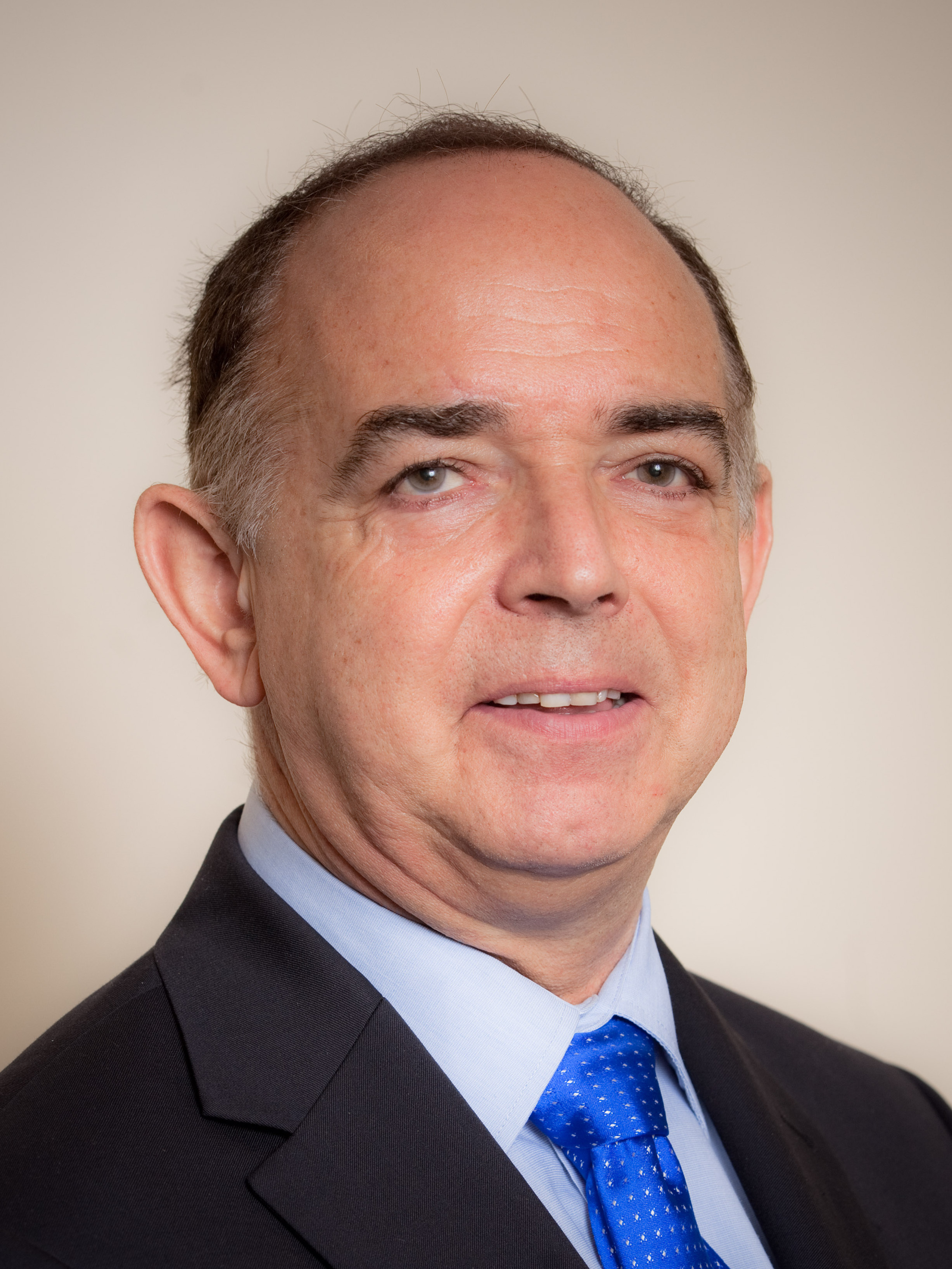

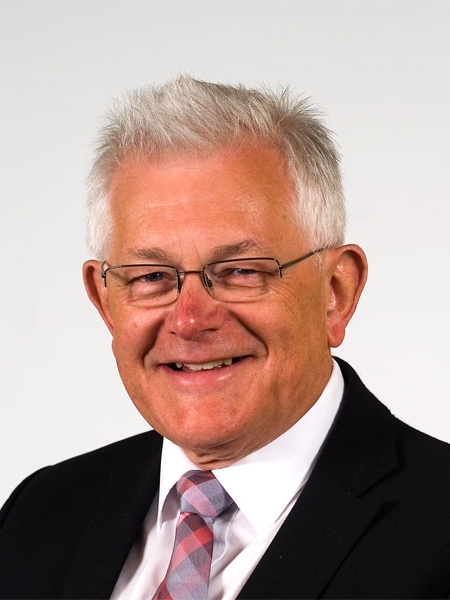
	First party	Second party
Leader	Rhodri Morgan	Ieuan Wyn Jones
Party	Labour	Plaid Cymru
Leader since	11 February 2000	3 August 2000
Leader's seat	Cardiff West	Ynys Môn
Last election	30 (Note: Includes 5 AMs sponsored by the Co-operative Party, who are designated Labour and Co-operative.) seats	12 seats
Seats before	29	12
Seats won	26 (Note: Includes 6 AMs sponsored by the Co-operative Party, who are designated Labour and Co-operative.)	15
Seat change	▼4	▲3
Constituency Vote	314,925	219,121
% and swing	32.2% ▼7.8%	22.4% ▲1.2%
Regional Vote	288,954	204,757
% and swing	29.6% ▼7.0%	21.0% ▲1.3%
	Third party	Fourth party
Leader	Nick Bourne	Michael German (Note: German was National Assembly group leader. The Welsh Liberal Democrat party leader during this election was Montgomeryshire MP Lembit Öpik, who would remain as leader until 2007.)
Party	Conservative	Liberal Democrats
Leader since	18 August 1999	20 November 1998
Leader's seat	Mid and West Wales	South Wales East
Last election	11 seats	6 seats
Seats before	11	6
Seats won	12	6
Seat change	▲1	Steady
Constituency Vote	218,730	144,450
% and swing	22.4% ▲2.5%	14.8% ▲0.7%
Regional Vote	209,153	114,500
% and swing	21.4% ▲2.3%	11.7% ▼1.0%
First Minister before election
Rhodri Morgan
Labour
First Minister after election
Rhodri Morgan
Labour

An election for the National Assembly for Wales was held on Thursday 3 May 2007 to elect members to the National Assembly for Wales. It was the third general election. On the same day local elections in England and Scotland, as well as the Scottish Parliament election took place. This election was preceded by the previous Assembly election in 2003.

The election saw Plaid Cymru make gains at the expense of Labour, although Labour remain the largest party in the Assembly, as they have since it began. Plaid stated they would make a referendum on devolving further powers to the National Assembly a condition for a coalition. Wales reported that senior civil servants before the election were preparing for three possible coalition administrations: Labour/Liberal Democrat, Labour/Plaid Cymru or Plaid Cymru/Liberal Democrat/Conservative.

Discussions between Plaid Cymru, the Conservatives and the Liberal Democrats to form a "Rainbow" Coalition broke down, and a coalition was eventually agreed upon between Labour and Plaid Cymru.

== Major parties ==
The Welsh Labour Party before the election had 29 seats, Plaid Cymru had 12, the Welsh Conservatives 11, the Welsh Liberal Democrats 6, Forward Wales 1, with 1 independent, Trish Law. Law had won her seat at a 2006 by-election. The one Forward Wales Assembly Member was elected as an independent before forming the party. The standings were otherwise identical to the 2003 results.

== Electoral method ==
In general elections for the National Assembly for Wales, each voter has two votes in a mixed member system. The first vote may be used to vote for a candidate to become the Assembly Member for the voter's constituency, elected by the first past the post system. The second vote may be used to vote for a regional closed party list of candidates. Additional member seats are allocated from the lists by the d'Hondt method, with constituency results being taken into account in the allocation. The overall result is approximately proportional.

== Pre-election forecasts ==
Predictions for the seat distribution were made by a number of polls before the election:

Forecast by	Dates	Lab	Plaid	Con	LD	other
Institute of Welsh Affairs	2007-01-13	25	13	13	7	2
NOP/ITV	2007-04-06	25	12	14	7	2
Western Mail	2007-04-27	25	15	10	8	2

== Electoral results ==
- Overall turnout – 43.7%

Welsh Assembly election, 2007
Parties	Additional-member system										Total seats		
Parties	Constituency					Region					Total seats		
Parties	Votes	%	+/−	Seats	+/−	Votes	%	+/−	Seats	+/−	Total	+/−	%
Labour	314,925	32.2	−7.8	24	−6	288,954	29.6	−7.0	2	+2	26 (Note: Includes 6 AMs sponsored by the Co-operative Party, who are designated Labour and Co-operative.)	−4	43.3
Plaid Cymru	219,121	22.4	+1.2	7	+2	204,757	21.0	+1.3	8	+1	15	+3	25.0
Conservative	218,730	22.4	+2.5	5	+4	209,153	21.5	+2.3	7	−3	12	+1	20.0
Liberal Democrats	144,450	14.8	+0.7	3	0	114,500	11.7	−1.0	3	0	6	0	10.0
BNP	—	—	—	—	—	42,197	4.3	+3.9	0	0	0	0	—
UKIP	18,047	1.8	−0.5	0	0	38,490	3.9	+0.4	0	0	0	0	—
Green	—	—	—	—	—	33,803	3.5	0.0	0	0	0	0	—
Socialist Labour	—	—	—	—	—	12,209	1.3	+0.1	0	0	0	0	—
Independent	29,699	3.0	+2.4	1	0	9,350	1.0	N/A	0	0	1	0	1.7
Welsh Christian	—	—	—	—	—	8,963	0.9	N/A	0	0	0	0	—
Communist	—	—	—	—	—	3,708	0.4	+0.3	0	0	0	0	—
CPA	—	—	—	—	—	2,694	0.3	N/A	0	0	0	0	—
Socialist	—	—	—	—	—	1,865	0.2	N/A	0	0	0	0	—
Respect	—	—	—	—	—	1,792	0.2	N/A	0	0	0	0	—
English Democrat	1,867	0.2	N/A	0	0	1,655	0.2	N/A	0	0	0	0	—
Veritas	—	—	—	—	—	505	0.1	N/A	0	0	0	0	—
Socialist Equality	—	—	—	—	—	292	0.0	N/A	0	0	0	0	—
Blaenau Gwent PV	3,348	0.3	N/A	0	0	—	—	—	—	—	0	0	—
Total	978,132			40		974,884			20		60		

(source:)

=== Votes summary ===
Popular vote
Labour	29.6%
Conservative	21.5%
Plaid Cymru	21.0%
Liberal Democrats	11.7%
BNP	4.3%
UKIP	3.9%
Green	3.5%
Socialist Labour	1.2%
Other	3.2%

Parliament seats
Labour	43.3%
Plaid Cymru	25.0%
Conservative	20.0%
Liberal Democrats	10.0%
Independent	1.7%

== Constituency nominations ==
NB: candidates in BOLD text were incumbent assembly members before the election

Constituency	Conservative	Labour	Liberal Democrats	Plaid Cymru	Others
Aberavon	Daisy Meyland-Smith	**Brian Gibbons**	Claire Waller	Linett Purcell	
Aberconwy	Dylan Jones-Evans	**Denise Idris Jones**	Euron Hughes	Gareth Jones	
Alyn and Deeside	Will Gallagher	**Carl Sargeant**	Paul Brighton	Dafydd Passe	William Crawford (UKIP)
Arfon	Gerry Frobisher	Martin Eaglestone	Mel Ab Owain	**Alun Ffred Jones**	Elwyn Williams (UKIP)
Blaenau Gwent	Bob Hayward	Keren Bender	Gareth Lewis	Natasha Asghar	**Trish Law** (Independent)
Brecon and Radnorshire	Suzy Davies	Neil Stone	**Kirsty Williams**	Arwel Lloyd	
Bridgend	Emma Greenow	**Carwyn Jones**	Paul Warren	Nick Thomas	
Caerphilly	Richard Foley	**Jeff Cuthbert**	Huw Price	Lindsay Whittle	Ron Davies (Independent)
Cardiff Central	Andrew Murphy	Sue Lent	**Jenny Randerson**	Thomas Whitfield	Frank Hughes (UKIP)
Cardiff North	Jonathan Morgan	Sophie Howe	Ed Bridges	Wyn Jones	Dai Llewellyn (UKIP)
Cardiff South and Penarth	Karen Robson	**Lorraine Barrett**	Dominic Hannigan	Jason Toby	
Cardiff West	Alun Craig Williams	**Rhodri Morgan**	Alison Goldworthy	Neil McEvoy	
Carmarthen East and Dinefwr	Henrietta Hensher	Kevin Madge	Ian Walton	**Rhodri Glyn Thomas**	
Carmarthen West and South Pembrokeshire	Angela Burns	**Christine Gwyther**	John Gossage	John Dixon	
Ceredigion	Trefor Jones	Linda Grace	John Davies	**Elin Jones**	Dafydd Morgan (Independent)
Clwyd South	John Bell	**Karen Sinclair**	Frank Biggs	Nia Davies	David Rowlands (UKIP)
Clwyd West	Darren Millar	**Alun Pugh**	Simon Croft	Phil Edwards	Warwick Nicholson (UKIP)
Cynon Valley	Neil John	**Christine Chapman**	Margaret Phelps	Liz Walters	
Delyn	Antoinette Sandbach	**Sandy Mewies**	Ian Matthews	Meg Elis	Derek Bigg (UKIP)
Dwyfor Meirionnydd	Mike Wood	David Phillips	Steve Churchman	**Dafydd Elis-Thomas**	
Gower	Byron Davies	**Edwina Hart**	Nick Tregoning	Darren Price	Alex Lewis (UKIP)
Islwyn	Paul Williams	**Irene James**	Mark J Maguire	Alan Pritchard	Kevin Etheridge (Independent)
Llanelli	Andrew Morgan	**Catherine Thomas**	Jeremy Townsend	Helen Mary Jones	
Merthyr Tydfil and Rhymney	Giles Howard	**Huw Lewis**	Amy Kitcher	Glyndwr Cennydd Jones	Clive Tovay (Independent), Jeff Edwards
Monmouth	Nick Ramsay	Richard Clark	Jacqui Sullivan	Jonathan T Clark	Ed Abrams (English Democrats)
Montgomeryshire	Dan Munford	Rachel Maycock	**Mick Bates**	David Thomas	Bruce Lawson (UKIP)
Neath	Andrew Silvertsen	**Gwenda Thomas**	Sheila Waye	Alun Llewelyn	
Newport East	Peter Fox	**John Griffiths**	Ed Townsend	Trefor Puw	Andrew Constantine (English Democrats)
Newport West	Matthew Evans	**Rosemary Butler**	Nigel Flanagan	Brian Hancock	Mike Blundell (English Democrats) & James Harris (Independent)
Ogmore	Norma Lloyd Nesling	**Janice Gregory**	Martin Plant	Sian Caiach	
Pontypridd	Janice Charles	**Jane Davidson**	Mike Powell	Richard Rhys Grigg	
Preseli Pembrokeshire	Paul Davies	**Tamsin Dunwoody**	Hywel Davies	John Osmond	
Rhondda	Howard Parsons	**Leighton Andrews**	Karen Roberts	Jill Evans	
Swansea East	Bob Dowdle	**Valerie Lloyd**	Helen Ceri Clarke	Danny Bowles	
Swansea West	Harri Lloyd Davies	**Andrew Davies**	Peter May	Ian Titherington	Richard Lewis (UKIP)
Torfaen	Graham Smith	**Lynne Neagle**	Patrick Legge	Rhys ab Elis	Ian Williams (People's Voice)
Vale of Clwyd	Matt Wright	**Ann Jones**	Mark Young	Mark Jones	
Vale of Glamorgan	Gordon Kemp	**Jane Hutt**	Mark Hooper	Barry Shaw	Kevin Mahoney (UKIP)
Wrexham	Felicity Elphick	Lesley Griffiths	Bruce Roberts	Siôn Aled Owen	**John Marek** (Independent), Peter Lewis (UKIP)
Ynys Môn	James Roach	Jonathan Austin	Mandi Abrahams	**Ieuan Wyn Jones**	Francis Wykes (UKIP), Peter Rogers (Independent)

- Trish Law had defended the seat she won in the 2006 by-election. Then and now, she was standing as an independent, but was affiliated with the Blaenau Gwent People's Voice Group.
- Ron Davies and John Marek stood as independents, but were members of and continued to play an active role in Forward Wales. Marek was the party's leader, while Davies was their policy director. Neither was elected on 3 May.

== Regional lists ==
=== Mid and West Wales ===
National Assembly for Wales election, 2007: Mid and West Wales
Constituency	Elected member	Result
Carmarthen East and Dinefwr	Rhodri Glyn Thomas	Plaid Cymru hold
Carmarthen West and South Pembrokeshire	Angela Burns	Conservative win
Ceredigion	Elin Jones	Plaid Cymru hold
Dwyfor Meirionnydd	Dafydd Elis-Thomas	Plaid Cymru hold
Llanelli	Helen Mary Jones	Plaid Cymru win
Montgomeryshire	Mick Bates	Liberal Democrats hold
Preseli Pembrokeshire	Paul Davies (politician)	Conservative win
Brecon and Radnorshire	Kirsty Williams	Liberal Democrats hold

	British National Party	Christian Peoples Alliance	Communist Party of Britain	Conservative Party	Green Party of England and Wales	Independent	Independent	Labour Party	Liberal Democrats	Plaid Cymru	Socialist Labour Party	UKIP	Veritas	Welsh Christian Party
1.	Ian Si'ree	Joseph Antony Biddulph	Rick Newnham	Nick Bourne	Leila Kiersch	Caroline Evans	Gwynoro Jones	Alun Davies	Cllr. Bill Powell	Nerys Evans	Alun Davies	Clive Easton	Iain Sheldon	Adam Bridgman
2.	Chris Edwards-Harrill		Elaine Blake	Glyn Davies	Timothy John Foster			Joyce Watson	Julianna Hughes	David Senior	Luke Hume	Nick Powell		M. Williams
3.	Lloyd Thomas Morgan		Graham Morgan	Lisa Francis	Marilyn Elson			Alun Wyn Richards	Cllr. Ken Harris	Delyth Richards	Patricia Ann Bowen	Dennis Taylor		J. Morgan
4.	Marie Murray		Clive Eliassen	O. J. Williams	John Jennings			Rhiannon Stone	Selwyn Runnett	Mrs. Liz Saville-Roberts	Maggie Davies	Virginia Whinnyates		M. Davies
5.				Richard Minshull	Chris Simpson			Dr. Parvaiz Ali	Cllr. David Peter					Martin Wiltshire
6.				M.J.H. Jefferies					Emma Hayes					
7.									Alexander Viol					

- RESULT: Labour – 2 seats; Plaid Cymru – 1 seat; Conservative – 1

=== North Wales ===
	British National Party	Christian Peoples Alliance	Communist Party of Britain	Conservative Party	Green Party of England and Wales	Labour Party	Liberal Democrats	Plaid Cymru	Socialist Labour Party	UKIP	Welsh Christian Party
1.	Ennys Hughes	Brian Churchill	Glyn Davies	Brynle Williams	Jim Killock	Ken Skates	Eleanor Burnham	Janet Ryder	Bob English	John Bufton	Lindsay Griffiths
2.	Dallus Weaver		Rhian Cartwright	Mark Isherwood	Joe Blakesley	Donna Hutton	Cllr. Tudor Jones	Dafydd Wigley	Dave Roberts	Nathan Gill	Rev. Heather Butler
3.	Simon Darby		Trevor Jones	Cllr. Janet Finch-Saunders	Maredudd ap Rheinallt	Cllr. Ronnie Hughes	Bobby Feeley	Dyfed Edwards	Judith Sambrook	Elaine Gill	Mark MacLeod
4.	Mike Howard		Mike Green	Paul Rogers	Cllr. Wilf Hastings	Wenna Williams	Cllr. Douglas Madge	Cllr. Abdul Khan	Paul Liversuch	Ken Khambatta	Justin Davies
5.				James Davies		Cllr. Chris Hughes	Cllr. Michael Edwards				
6.				John Broughton			Anne Williams				

- RESULT: Conservative – 2 seats; Plaid Cymru – 1 seat; LibDem – 1 seat

=== South Wales Central ===
	British National Party	Christian Peoples Alliance	Communist Party of Britain	Conservative Party	Green Party of England and Wales	Labour Party	Liberal Democrats	Plaid Cymru	RESPECT The Unity Coalition	Socialist Alternative	Socialist Equality Party	Socialist Labour Party	UKIP	Welsh Christian Party
1.	John Walker	Anthony Jeremy	Robert Griffiths	David Melding	John Matthews	Iftakhar Khan	Cllr. John Dixon	Leanne Wood	Karen Tyre	Dave Reid	Chris Talbot	Liz Screen	John Pratt	W. Johannsen
2.	Laurence Reid		Gwen Griffiths	Andrew R. T. Davies	Richard Payne	Cerys Furlong	Cllr. Gavin Cox	Chris Franks		Rowena Mason	David O'Sullivan	Harry Parfitt	David Bevan	D. Thomson
3.	Tim Windsor		Fran Rawlings	Victoria Green	Nigel Baker	Anthony Hunt	Alexandra Macmillan	Gwenllian Lansdown		Andrew Price	Stuart Nolan	Ina Marsden	Dr K. T. Rajan	D. Williams
4.	Mark Deacon		Clive Griffiths	Richard John	Richard Clarke	Jayne Brencher	Cllr. Asghar Ali	Mohammed Sarul Islam		Jane Jackson	Poopalasingham Thillaivarothayan	Rob Hawkins	William Potter	J. Storey
5.				Mike Jones-Pritchard	Anthony Matthews	Matt Greenough	Cllr. Margaret Jones			Alex Gounelas				
6.				Jon Burns	Elizabeth Ale		Andrew Sherwood			Joe Fathallah				

- RESULT: Conservative – 2 seats; Plaid Cymru – 2 seats

=== South Wales East ===
	British National Party	Christian Peoples Alliance	Communist Party of Britain	Conservative Party	English Democrats	Green Party of England and Wales	Independent	Labour Party	Liberal Democrats	Plaid Cymru	Socialist Labour Party	UKIP	Welsh Christian Party
1.	Robert James Trueman	Madeleine Jeremy	Roy Evans	William Graham	Steve Gash	Ann Were	Colin Hobbs	Cllr. Mark Whitcutt	Michael German	Jocelyn Davies	John Cox	David J Rowlands	Jeff Green
2.	Peter Greenhalgh	Sara Jeremy	Angharad Halpin	Laura Anne Jones	Alan England	Alasdair McGowen		Tunji Fahm	Cllr. Veronica Watkins	Mohammad Asghar	Sue Deare	Keith Morgan	Geoff Waggett
3.	Marlene Jordan		Dan Cole	David Chipp	Fred Bishop	Gerry Layton		Julie Helen Robinson	Cllr. Phylip Hobson	Colin Mann	Glenn Eynon	Roger Thomas	Peter Watkins
4.	Christopher Robinson		Dave Rawlings	Andrew Roberts	David Lane	Owen Clarke		John Wright Turner	Alison Willott	Glyn Erasmus	Cerian Screen	Hugh Moelwyn Hughes	Richard Patching
5.					Steven Uncles			Rhianon Passmore	Cllr. David Hando		Joyce Giblin		
6.					Michael Russell				Jean Gray				

- RESULT: Plaid Cymru – 2 seats; Conservative – 1 seat; LibDem – 1 seat
- Mohammad Asghar was the first ethnic minority member of the Assembly for Plaid Cymru but on 8 December 2009, he switched to the Conservatives.
- Veronica German succeeded Mike German as the Liberal Democrat AM following his appointment to the House of Lords.

=== South Wales West ===
	British National Party	Christian Peoples Alliance	Communist Party of Britain	Conservative Party	Green Party of England and Wales	Independent Conservative	Independent	Labour Party	Liberal Democrats	Plaid Cymru	RESPECT The Unity Coalition	Socialist Alternative	Socialist Labour Party	UKIP	Welsh Christian Party
1.	Clive Bennett	Anne Savoury	David Brown	Alun Cairns	Rhodri Griffiths	John Jenkins	Keith James	Howard Davies	Peter Black	Bethan Jenkins	Paul Lynch	Ross Saunders	Jacob Bowen	Tim Jenkins	David Griffiths
2.	Nick Griffin		Mick Carty	Chris Smart	Brig Oubridge			Cllr. Alana Davies	Cllr. Jackie Radford	David Lloyd	Ahmed Al-Jeffery	Alec Thraves	Martha Page-Harries	Mike Squires	Anthony Kelly
3.	John Cooper		Sian O'Brien	Gerald Rowbottom	Jane Richmond			Cllr. Leighton Veale	Frank Little	Lisa Turnbull		Ron Job	Miriam Scale	Denise Robinson	Katherine Bridgman
4.	Jennifer King		Rob Uprichard	Kenneth Watts	Jonathan Spink			Cllr. Erika Kirchner	Cllr. Mike Day	Carolyn Edwards		Lianne Francis	Howard Rees	Josie MacDonald	Tim Price
5.				Bob Smith				David Rees	Cllr. Peter Foley			Bernard Roome			Theresa Jenkins
6.									Cllr. Norah Clarke			Mark Evans			
7.									Rachael Hitchinson						
8.									Marilyn Harris						

In South Wales West, there were also party lists from the Communist Party of Britain, Christian Peoples Alliance, Respect Party, Socialist Labour Party, Welsh Christian Party in addition to two independents, Keith James and John Hudson Jenkins.

== New members ==
Thirteen of the members elected to the Assembly in the election were not members of the previous Assembly, including Gareth Jones, who sat in the Assembly from 1999 to 2003 and lost his seat in that year's election.

- Mohammad Asghar, Plaid Cymru, South Wales East
- Angela Burns, Welsh Conservatives, Carmarthen West and South Pembrokeshire
- Alun Davies, Labour Co-op, Mid and West Wales
- Andrew R. T. Davies, Welsh Conservative, South Wales Central
- Paul Davies, Welsh Conservatives, Preseli Pembrokeshire
- Nerys Evans, Plaid Cymru, Mid and West Wales
- Chris Franks, Plaid Cymru, South Wales Central
- Lesley Griffiths, Welsh Labour, Wrexham
- Bethan Jenkins, Plaid Cymru, South Wales West
- Gareth Jones, Plaid Cymru, Aberconwy (previously represented Conwy, 1999–2003)
- Darren Millar, Welsh Conservatives, Clwyd West
- Nick Ramsay, Welsh Conservatives, Monmouth
- Joyce Watson, Welsh Labour, Mid and West Wales

== Defeated members ==
Nine sitting AMs were defeated at the polls.

- Glyn Davies, Welsh Conservative, Mid and West Wales
- Tamsin Dunwoody, Welsh Labour, Preseli Pembrokeshire
- Lisa Francis, Welsh Conservatives, Mid and West Wales
- Christine Gwyther, Welsh Labour, Carmarthen West and South Pembrokeshire
- Denise Idris Jones, Welsh Labour, Conwy (defeated in Aberconwy)
- Laura Anne Jones, Welsh Conservatives, South Wales East
- John Marek, Independent, Wrexham
- Alun Pugh, Welsh Labour, Clwyd West
- Catherine Thomas, Welsh Labour, Llanelli

== Retiring members ==
Four sitting AMs did not offer themselves for re-election.

- David Davies, Welsh Conservatives, Monmouth
- Janet Davies, Plaid Cymru, South Wales West
- Sue Essex, Welsh Labour, Cardiff North
- Owen John Thomas, Plaid Cymru, South Wales Central

== National election, 2003 ==
Due to boundary changes, the composition of the outgoing Assembly did not reflect the Assembly that was elected in May 2003 (see National Assembly for Wales constituencies and electoral regions). The main changes were in northwestern Wales, where the constituencies of Conwy, Caernarfon, and Meirionydd nant Conwy were replaced by Aberconwy, Arfon and Dwyfor Meirionnydd.

== See also ==
- 2007 Scottish Parliament election and 2007 United Kingdom local elections the same day
- One Wales, the resultant coalition agreement.
