= Huws =

Huws is a surname. Notable people with the surname include:

- Bethan Huws (born 1961), Welsh artist
- Emily Huws (born 1942), Welsh writer
- Emyr Huws (born 1993), Welsh footballer
- Iwan Huws, Welsh politician
- Martin Huws, Welsh journalist, novelist and poet
- Meri Huws, Welsh Language Commissioner
