= Clwyd West (Senedd constituency) =

Senedd constituency (1999–2026)

Coordinates: 53°08′43″N 3°26′49″W

Clwyd West Gorllewin Clwyd
- Former Senedd county constituency for the Senedd

- Clwyd West shown within the North Wales electoral region and the region shown within Wales

Former Senedd county constituency
- Created: 1999
- Abolished: 2026
- Party: Conservative
- MS: Darren Millar
- Preserved county: Clwyd

Clwyd West (Welsh: Gorllewin Clwyd) was a constituency of the Senedd. It elected one Member of the Senedd by the first past the post method of election. Also, however, it was one of nine constituencies in the North Wales electoral region, which elected four additional members, in addition to nine constituency members, to produce a degree of proportional representation for the region as a whole.

== Boundaries ==
Map of 2007–2026 boundaries

The constituency was created for the first election to the Assembly, in 1999, with the name and boundaries of the Clwyd West Westminster constituency. It is entirely within the preserved county of Clwyd. For the 2007 Assembly election part of Clwyd West was transferred to the Vale of Clwyd constituency, and Clwyd West included an area currently within the Clwyd South constituency. For Westminster purposes, the same boundary changes became effective for the 2010 United Kingdom general election.

As created in 1999, the North Wales region included the constituencies of Alyn and Deeside, Caernarfon, Clwyd West, Clwyd South, Conwy, Delyn, Vale of Clwyd, Wrexham and Ynys Môn. After the 2007 Assembly election the region included Aberconwy, Alyn and Deeside, Arfon, Clwyd South, Clwyd West, Delyn, Vale of Clwyd, Wrexham and Ynys Môn.

== Voting ==
In elections for the Senedd, each voter had two votes. The first vote was used to vote for a candidate to become the Member of the Senedd for the voter's constituency, elected by the first past the post system. The second vote was used to vote for a regional closed party list of candidates. Additional member seats are allocated from the lists by the d'Hondt method, with constituency results being taken into account in the allocation.

== Assembly members and Members of the Senedd ==
Election	Member	Party	Portrait
1999	Alun Pugh	Labour	
2007	Darren Millar	Conservative	

== Elections ==
=== Elections in the 2020s ===
2021 Senedd election: Clwyd West
Party	Candidate	Constituency			Regional		
Party	Candidate	Votes	%	±%	Votes	%	±%
Conservative	Darren Millar (Note: Incumbent member for this constituency)	11,839	41.7	+0.4	10,278	35.2	+3.0
Labour	Joshua Hurst	8,154	28.7	+8.7	8,753	29.9	+6.8
Plaid Cymru	Elin Walker-Jones	5,609	19.8	-2.2	6,129	21.0	+1.1
Liberal Democrats	David Wilkins	1,158	4.1	+0.9	1,027	3.5	-0.2
UKIP	Jeanie Barton	520	1.8	-9.6	420	1.4	-11.0
Abolish	Euan McGivern	502	1.8	New	996	3.4	-0.8
Reform UK	N. Clare Eno	304	1.1	New	286	1.0	New
Gwlad	Rhydian Hughes	277	1.0	New	157	0.5	New
Green					870	3.0	+0.8
Freedom Alliance (UK)					142	0.5	New
Communist					60	0.2	±0.0
Independent	Michelle Brown				51	0.2	New
Propel					41	0.1	New
TUSC					21	0.1	New
Majority		3,685	13.0	−6.3			
Turnout		28,363	48.34	+2.8			
Conservative hold		Swing					

=== Elections in the 2010s ===
Welsh Assembly Election 2016: Clwyd West
Party	Candidate	Constituency			Regional		
Party	Candidate	Votes	%	±%	Votes	%	±%
Conservative	Darren Millar	10,831	41.3	−2.0	8,422	32.2	-4.3
Plaid Cymru	Llyr Gruffydd	5,768	22.0	−1.0	5,213	19.9	-2.9
Labour	Jo Thomas	5,246	20.0	−6.4	6,048	23.1	±0.0
UKIP	David Edwards	2,985	11.4	New	3,232	12.4	+7.7
Liberal Democrats	Victor Babu	831	3.2	−4.1	969	3.7	-1.7
Green	Julian Mahy	565	2.2	New	579	2.2	+0.3
Abolish					1,090	4.2	New
Association of Welsh Independents					320	1.2	New
Monster Raving Loony					128	0.5	New
Mark Young - Independent					98	0.4	New
Communist					49	0.2	-0.1
Majority		5,063	19.3	+2.4			
Turnout		26,226	45.5	+2.3			
Conservative hold		Swing					

Welsh Assembly Election 2011: Clwyd West
Party	Candidate	Constituency			Regional		
Party	Candidate	Votes	%	±%	Votes	%	±%
Conservative	Darren Millar (Note: Incumbent member for this constituency)	10,890	43.3	+9.3	9,194	36.5	+2.9
Labour	Crispin Jones	6,642	26.4	−1.5	5,827	23.1	+0.8
Plaid Cymru	Eifion Lloyd Jones	5,775	23.0	−4.3	5,732	22.8	-4.3
Liberal Democrats	Brian Cossey	1,846	7.3	+0.8	1,365	5.4	-0.9
UKIP					1,191	4.7	+1.3
Socialist Labour					554	2.2	+1.1
BNP					493	2.0	-1.5
Green					477	1.9	+0.5
Welsh Christian					169	0.7	+0.2
Weyman - Independent					122	0.5	New
Communist					63	0.3	±0.0
Majority		4,248	16.9	+10.8			
Turnout		25,153	43.2	−2.5			
Conservative hold		Swing	+3.9				

Regional ballots rejected: 159

=== Elections in the 2000s ===
Welsh Assembly Election 2007: Clwyd West
Party	Candidate	Constituency			Regional		
Party	Candidate	Votes	%	±%	Votes	%	±%
Conservative	Darren Millar	8,905	34.0	+1.3	8,765	33.6	+2.4
Labour	Alun Pugh	7,309	27.9	−6.9	5,817	22.3	-7.3
Plaid Cymru	Philip Edwards	7,162	27.3	+5.9	7,073	27.1	+4.5
Liberal Democrats	Simon Croft	1,705	6.5	−1.4	1,646	6.3	-3.1
UKIP	Warwick Nicholson	1,124	4.3	+3.0	888	3.4	+0.4
BNP					925	3.5	New
Green					376	1.4	-0.4
Socialist Labour					277	1.1	New
Welsh Christian					138	0.5	New
CPA					134	0.5	New
Communist					70	0.3	New
Majority		1,596	6.1	N/A			
Turnout		26,205	45.7	+5.4			
Conservative gain from Labour		Swing	+4.1				

Welsh Assembly Election 2003: Clwyd West
Party	Candidate	Constituency			Regional		
Party	Candidate	Votes	%	±%	Votes	%	±%
Labour	Alun Pugh	7,693	34.8	+3.8	6,510	29.6	
Conservative	Brynle Williams	7,257	32.8	+4.8	6,869	31.2	
Plaid Cymru	Janet Ryder	4,715	21.3	−6.0	4,987	22.6	
Liberal Democrats	Eleanor Burnham	1,743	7.9	−5.8	2,065	9.4	
UKIP					669	3.0	
Green					387	1.8	
John Marek Independent Party					358	1.6	
Cymru Annibynnol					102	0.5	
Communist					43	0.2	
ProLife Alliance					34	0.2	
Majority		436	2.0	−1.0			
Turnout		22,123	40.6	−6.3			
Labour hold		Swing	−0.5				

2003 Electorate: 54,463
Regional ballots rejected: 344

=== Elections in the 1990s ===
Welsh Assembly Election 1999: Clwyd West
Party	Candidate	Constituency			Regional		
Party	Candidate	Votes	%	±%	Votes	%	±%
Labour	Alun Pugh	7,824	31.0	N/A	6,894	27.8	N/A
Conservative	Rod Richards	7,064	28.0	N/A	6,317	25.5	N/A
Plaid Cymru	Eilian S. Williams	6,886	27.3	N/A	7,876	31.7	N/A
Liberal Democrats	Robina L. Feeley	3,462	13.7	N/A	2,823	11.4	N/A
Green					Unknown	Unknown	N/A
Rhuddlan Debt Protest Campaign					Unknown	Unknown	N/A
United Socialist					Unknown	Unknown	N/A
Communist					Unknown	Unknown	N/A
Natural Law					Unknown	Unknown	N/A
Majority		760	3.0	N/A			
Turnout		25,236	46.9	N/A			
Labour win (new seat)							
