= Aberconwy (Senedd constituency) =

Senedd constituency (2007–2026)

Coordinates: 53.302°N 3.805°W

- Former Senedd county constituency for the Senedd

- Aberconwy shown within the North Wales electoral region of Bangor Conwy Môn and the region shown within Wales

Former Senedd county constituency
- Created: 2007
- Abolished: 2026
- Party: Conservative
- Member of the Senedd: Janet Finch-Saunders
- Preserved county: Clwyd
- Created from: Conwy and Meirionnydd Nant Conwy

Aberconwy was a constituency of the Senedd. First created for the former Assembly's 2007 election. It elected one Member of the Senedd by the first past the post method of election. It was one of nine constituencies in the North Wales electoral region, which elected four additional members, in addition to nine constituency members, to produce a degree of proportional representation for the region as a whole.

== History ==
Since its creation, this seat had been a three-way marginal constituency between the Conservatives, Labour and Plaid Cymru. Plaid won this seat in the 2007 election but afterwards the Conservatives have narrowly held the constituency.

== Boundaries ==
Map of 2007–2026 boundaries

The constituency had the same boundary as the Aberconwy Westminster constituency prior to the 2023 review of Westminster constituencies, which came into use for the 2010 United Kingdom general election. It was created in 2007 and merges into one constituency areas formerly within the Conwy and Meirionnydd Nant Conwy constituencies. Conwy was a constituency within the North Wales electoral region, straddling the boundary between the preserved county of Clwyd and the preserved county of Gwynedd. Meirionnydd Nant Conwy also straddled this boundary, but was within the Mid and West Wales region.

Aberconwy constituency was entirely within the preserved county of Clwyd.

It was composed of the Conwy electoral divisions: Betws-y-Coed, Bryn, Caerhun, Capelulo, Conwy, Craig-y-Don, Crwst, Deganwy, Egwysbach, Gogarth, Gower, Llansanffraid, Marl, Mostyn, Pandy, Penmaenan, Penrhyn, Pensarn, Trefriw, Tudno and Uwch Conwy.

The North Wales region was created for the first Assembly election, in 1999. For the 2007 election, however, it had new boundaries. It included the constituencies of Aberconwy, Alyn and Deeside, Arfon, Clwyd South, Clwyd West, Delyn, Vale of Clwyd, Wrexham and Ynys Môn.

== Voting ==
In general elections for the Senedd, each voter had two votes. The first vote was used to vote for a candidate to become the Member of the Senedd for the voter's constituency, elected by the first past the post system. The second vote was used to vote for a regional closed party list of candidates. Additional member seats were allocated from the lists by the d'Hondt method, with constituency results being taken into account in the allocation.

== Members of the Senedd ==
| Election | Member | Portrait | Party |
|---|---|---|---|
| 2007 | Gareth Jones | | Plaid Cymru |
| 2011 | Janet Finch-Saunders | | Conservative |

== Elections ==
=== Elections in the 2020s ===
2021 Senedd election: Aberconwy
| Party | Candidate | Constituency | | | Regional | | |
| Party | Candidate | Votes | % | ±% | Votes | % | ±% |
|---|---|---|---|---|---|---|---|
| Conservative | Janet Finch-Saunders (Note: Incumbent member for this constituency) | 9,815 | 41.7 | +7.0 | 7,925 | 33.8 | +10.2 |
| Plaid Cymru | Aaron Wynne | 6,479 | 27.5 | -3.8 | 5,932 | 25.3 | -1.9 |
| Labour | Dawn McGuinness | 5,971 | 25.4 | -2.0 | 6,446 | 27.5 | +5.0 |
| Liberal Democrats | Rhys Jones | 735 | 3.1 | -0.4 | 680 | 2.9 | -0.9 |
| Reform | Rachel Bagshaw | 320 | 1.4 | New | 237 | 1.0 | New |
| No More Lockdowns | Sharon Smith | 223 | 0.9 | New | | | |
| Abolish | | | | | 787 | 3.4 | -1.2 |
| Green | | | | | 744 | 3.2 | +0.7 |
| UKIP | | | | | 287 | 1.2 | -9.4 |
| Freedom Alliance (UK) | | | | | 161 | 0.7 | New |
| Gwlad | | | | | 120 | 0.5 | New |
| Communist | | | | | 54 | 0.2 | ±0.0 |
| Independent | Michelle Brown | | | | 35 | 0.1 | New |
| Propel | | | | | 28 | 0.1 | New |
| TUSC | | | | | 11 | 0.0 | New |
| Majority | | 3,336 | 14.2 | +10.8 | | | |
| Turnout | | 23,543 | 51.82 | +2.8 | | | |
| Conservative hold | | Swing | +5.4 | | | | |

=== Elections in the 2010s ===
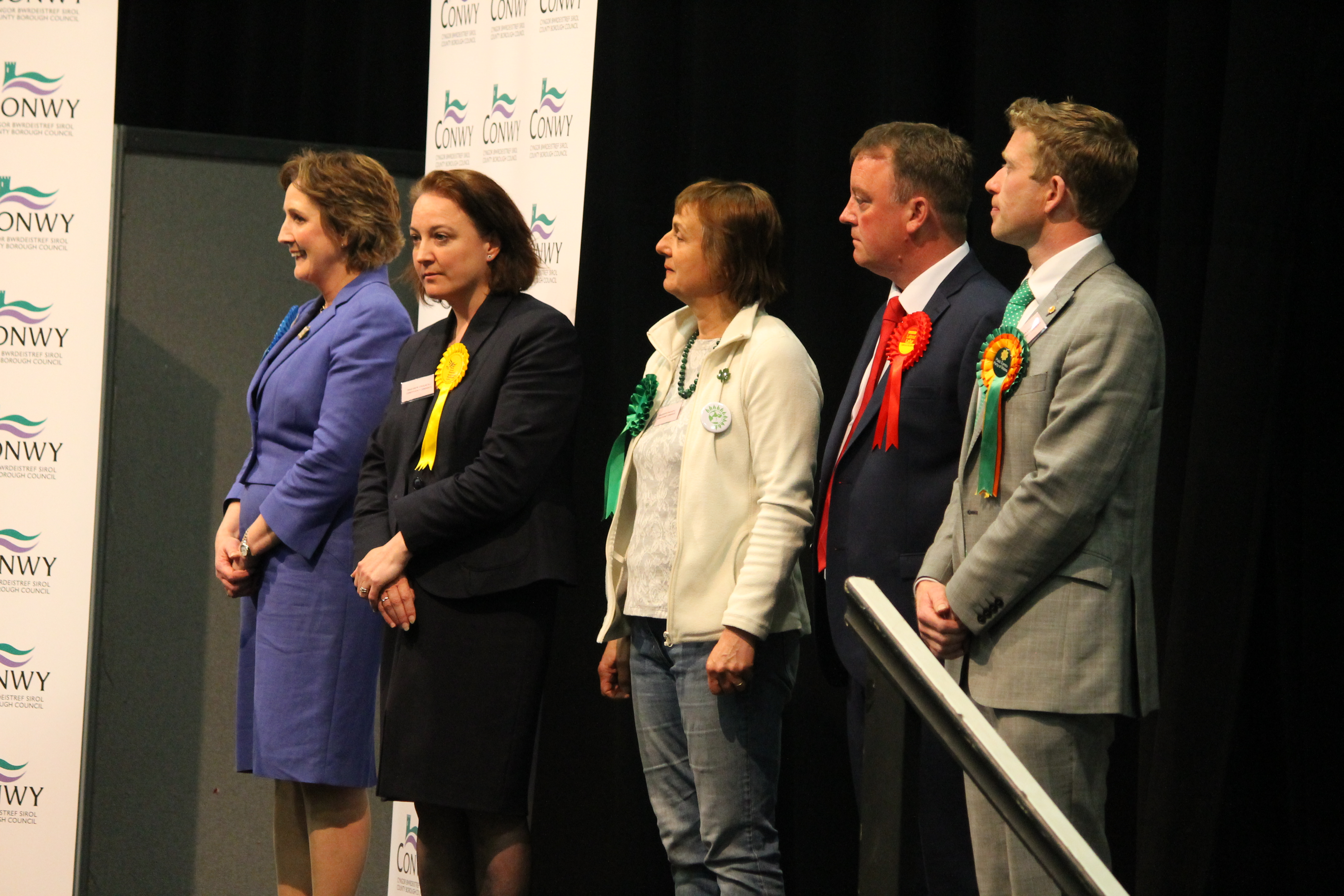
Aberconwy vote count at the 2016 Assembly election (L-R: Janet Finch Saunders, Sarah Lesiter-Burgess, Petra Haig, Mike Priestley, Trystan Lewis)

Welsh Assembly Election 2016: Aberconwy
| Party | Candidate | Constituency | | | Regional | | |
| Party | Candidate | Votes | % | ±% | Votes | % | ±% |
|---|---|---|---|---|---|---|---|
| Conservative | Janet Finch-Saunders | 7,646 | 34.7 | +0.7 | 5,808 | 23.6 | -6.7 |
| Plaid Cymru | Trystan Lewis | 6,892 | 31.3 | +5.1 | 5,994 | 27.2 | +2.8 |
| Labour | Mike Priestley | 6,039 | 27.4 | +1.7 | 4,961 | 22.5 | -1.7 |
| Liberal Democrats | Sarah Lesiter-Burgess | 871 | 3.5 | -10.7 | 847 | 3.8 | -4.3 |
| Green | Petra Haig | 680 | 3.1 | New | 547 | 2.5 | +0.1 |
| UKIP | | | | | 2,343 | 10.6 | +5.9 |
| Abolish | | | | | 1,026 | 4.6 | New |
| Association of Welsh Independents | | | | | 310 | 1.4 | New |
| Monster Raving Loony | | | | | 133 | 0.6 | New |
| Communist | | | | | 54 | 0.2 | ±0.0 |
| Mark Young - Independent | | | | | 44 | 0.2 | New |
| Majority | | 754 | 3.4 | −4.4 | | | |
| Turnout | | 22,038 | 49.0 | +3.9 | | | |
| Conservative hold | | Swing | -2.2 | | | | |

Welsh Assembly Election 2011: Aberconwy
| Party | Candidate | Constituency | | | Regional | | |
| Party | Candidate | Votes | % | ±% | Votes | % | ±% |
|---|---|---|---|---|---|---|---|
| Conservative | Janet Finch-Saunders | 6,888 | 34.0 | +3.6 | 6,153 | 30.3 | +1.4 |
| Plaid Cymru | Iwan Huws | 5,321 | 26.2 | -12.4 | 4,948 | 24.4 | -8.2 |
| Labour | Eifion Williams | 5,206 | 25.7 | +3.9 | 4,905 | 24.2 | -4.3 |
| Liberal Democrats | Mike Priestley | 2,873 | 14.2 | +4.9 | 1,653 | 8.1 | +0.9 |
| UKIP | | | | | 959 | 4.7 | +1.5 |
| Green | | | | | 477 | 2.4 | -0.4 |
| BNP | | | | | 362 | 1.8 | -1.4 |
| Socialist Labour | | | | | 337 | 1.7 | +0.9 |
| Weyman - Independent | | | | | 318 | 1.6 | New |
| Welsh Christian | | | | | 129 | 0.6 | -0.1 |
| Communist | | | | | 43 | 0.2 | ±0.0 |
| Majority | | 1,567 | 7.8 | N/A | | | |
| Turnout | | 20,288 | 45.1 | −1.8 | | | |
| Conservative gain from Plaid Cymru | | Swing | +8.0 | | | | |

Regional ballots rejected: 162

=== Elections in the 2000s ===
Welsh Assembly Election 2007: Aberconwy
| Party | Candidate | Constituency | | | Regional | | |
| Party | Candidate | Votes | % | ±% | Votes | % | ±% |
|---|---|---|---|---|---|---|---|
| Plaid Cymru | Gareth Jones | 7,983 | 38.6 | N/A | 6,712 | 32.6 | N/A |
| Conservative | Dylan Jones-Evans | 6,290 | 30.4 | N/A | 5,954 | 28.9 | N/A |
| Labour | Denise Idris Jones | 4,508 | 21.8 | N/A | 4,108 | 19.9 | N/A |
| Liberal Democrats | Euron Hughes | 1,918 | 9.3 | N/A | 1,477 | 7.2 | N/A |
| BNP | | | | | 667 | 3.2 | N/A |
| UKIP | | | | | 655 | 3.2 | N/A |
| Green | | | | | 567 | 2.8 | N/A |
| Socialist Labour | | | | | 175 | 0.8 | N/A |
| Welsh Christian | | | | | 141 | 0.7 | N/A |
| CPA | | | | | 105 | 0.5 | N/A |
| Communist | | | | | 50 | 0.2 | N/A |
| Majority | | 1,693 | 8.2 | N/A | | | |
| Turnout | | 20,699 | 46.9 | N/A | | | |
| Plaid Cymru win (new seat) | | | | | | | |
