= Denise Idris Jones =

Welsh politician (1950–2020)

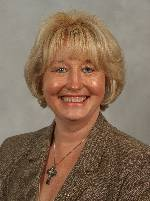

Member of the Welsh Assembly for Conwy
- In office 1 May 2003 – 3 May 2007
- Preceded by: Gareth Jones
- Succeeded by: Constituency abolished Gareth Jones (Aberconwy); Alun Ffred Jones (Arfon)

Personal details
- Born: 7 December 1950
- Died: 24 July 2020 (aged 69)

Denise Idris Jones (7 December 1950 – 24 July 2020; née Woodrow) was a Welsh politician and teacher. A member of the Labour Party, she served as the National Assembly for Wales Member for the Conwy constituency from 2003 to 2007.

== Early life and education ==
Jones was born in Rhos, Wrexham County Borough, to James and Rhona Woodrow. As a student in Liverpool, she worked on Harold Wilson's campaign.

== Teaching career ==
Jones taught both English and French at Ysgol Grango, Rhosllannerchrugog, for around three decades. She spoke Welsh, English and French.

== Political career ==
Jones contested the Meirionnydd Nant Conwy constituency in the 1999 National Assembly for Wales election, losing to Dafydd Elis-Thomas.

At the 2003 Assembly elections she contested the Conwy constituency, defeating Plaid Cymru incumbent Gareth Jones by 72 votes.

In 2003, shortly after being elected, she left the Assembly chamber during a vote to post a letter. The then Welsh government subsequently lost a motion after the vote tied 29–29, with the Presiding Officer required by standing orders to cast the deciding vote against. Jones apologised for missing the division, stating, "I am sorry that I missed the vote because I have found as a new member that I haven't been made aware of certain things. I took a letter up to the office and there was no division bell which I expected and when I got back I had missed the vote. I'll never do that again."

=== Committee work and policy interests ===
During the Second Assembly, Jones sat on the Culture, Welsh Language and Sport Committee, the Education and Lifelong Learning Committee, the Audit Committee, and the North Wales Regional Committee. In committee she questioned how to target "areas whose populations have the most inactive lifestyles" and did so bilingually, interjecting in Welsh that "Nid oes achos cael 50 pêl droed" ("there is no need to have 50 footballs"). She also pressed officials on school funding consistency and the implementation of 14–19 Learning Pathways in evidence sessions of the Committee on School Funding. On the North Wales Regional Committee she raised coastal-access issues, asking whether "coastal access could be given the same treatment as countryside access".

=== Later election ===
For the 2007 Assembly elections, the Conwy constituency was split into the new Aberconwy and Arfon constituencies. Jones contested Aberconwy and came third, losing to Gareth Jones.

== Other roles ==
Jones declared an interest as a Member of the Council of the University of Wales, Bangor, during Audit Committee proceedings in December 2004.

== Personal life ==
Jones married John Idris Jones in 1984 and had two sons. She was a grandmother to six grandchildren: Millie, Billy, Poppy, Connie, Libby and Dilys. She died peacefully at home in Ruthin on 24 July 2020.

== Legacy ==
Following her death, Elin Jones, Llywydd of the Senedd, paid tribute, stating: "Denise was a valued Member of the second Senedd. Condolences to the family and the many communities across north Wales to whom she was so committed."
