= Conwy (Assembly constituency) =

Welsh Assembly constituency (1999–2007)

Coordinates: 53.191°N 3.688°W

Conwy
Former Welsh Assembly county constituency
Conwy shown as one of the 40 Welsh Assembly constituencies from 1999 to 2007
Created:	1999
Abolished:	2007
Electoral region:	North Wales
Preserved counties:	Clwyd and Gwynedd

Conwy was a constituency of the National Assembly for Wales from 1999 to 2007. It elected one Assembly Member by the first past the post method of election. It was also one of nine constituencies in the North Wales electoral region, which elected four additional members, in addition to nine constituency members, to produce a degree of proportional representation for the region as a whole.

== Boundaries ==
The constituency was created for the first election to the Assembly, in 1999, with the name and boundaries of the Conwy Westminster constituency. It was partly within the preserved county of Clwyd and partly within the preserved county of Gwynedd.

The other eight constituencies of the region were Alyn and Deeside, Caernarfon, Clwyd South, Clwyd West, Delyn, Vale of Clwyd, Wrexham and Ynys Môn.

The Conwy constituency was replaced for the 2007 Assembly election. Its area became partly within the Arfon constituency, and partly within the Aberconwy constituency. Arfon is entirely within the preserved county of Gwynedd and Aberconwy is entirely within the preserved county of Clwyd. Both of these constituencies are in the North Wales electoral region. For Westminster purposes, the new constituency boundaries became effective from the 2010 United Kingdom general election.

== Voting ==
In general elections for the National Assembly for Wales, each voter has two votes. The first vote may be used to vote for a candidate to become the Assembly Member for the voter's constituency, elected by the first past the post system. The second vote may be used to vote for a regional closed party list of candidates. Additional member seats are allocated from the lists by the d'Hondt method, with constituency results being taken into account in the allocation.

== Members of the National Assembly for Wales ==
Election	Member	Party	Photo
1999	Gareth Jones	Plaid Cymru	
2003	Denise Idris Jones	Labour	
2007	constituency abolished; see Arfon and Aberconwy		

== Election results ==
Welsh Assembly Election 2003: Conwy
Party	Candidate	Constituency			Regional		
Party	Candidate	Votes	%	±%	Votes	%	±%
Labour	Denise Idris Jones	6,467	30.9	+0.8	6,462	30.9	+0.2
Plaid Cymru	Gareth Jones	6,395	30.6	0.0	5,283	25.3	-5.1
Conservative	Guto Bebb	5,152	24.6	+6.1	4,671	22.3	+3.4
Liberal Democrats	Graham Rees	2,914	13.9	−2.6	2,575	12.3	-3.1
Green					725	3.5	+0.9
UKIP					549	2.6	New
John Marek Independent Party					408	2.0	New
Cymru Annibynnol					130	0.6	New
Communist					79	0.4	+0.2
ProLife Alliance					30	0.1	New
Majority		72	0.3	N/A			
Turnout		20,928	38.4	−10.8			
Labour gain from Plaid Cymru		Swing	+0.4				

2003 Electorate: 55,291
Regional ballots rejected: 273

Welsh Assembly Election 1999: Conwy
Party	Candidate	Constituency			Regional		
Party	Candidate	Votes	%	±%	Votes	%	±%
Plaid Cymru	Gareth Jones	8,285	30.6	N/A	8,306	30.4	
Labour	Cath Sherrington	8,171	30.1	N/A	8,383	30.7	
Conservative	David Jones	5,006	18.5	N/A	5,171	18.9	
Liberal Democrats	Christine Humphreys	4,480	16.5	N/A	4,189	15.4	
Independent	Goronwy Edwards	1,160	4.3	N/A			
Green					715	2.6	
Natural Law					312	1.1	
Socialist Alliance					118	0.4	
Communist					68	0.2	
Rhuddlan Debt Protest Campaign					26	0.1	
Majority		114	0.5	N/A			
Turnout		27,102	49.2	N/A			
Plaid Cymru win (new seat)							

== See also ==
- North Wales (National Assembly for Wales electoral region)
- National Assembly for Wales constituencies and electoral regions
