= Gareth Jones (politician) =

Welsh politician

Gareth Jones OBE
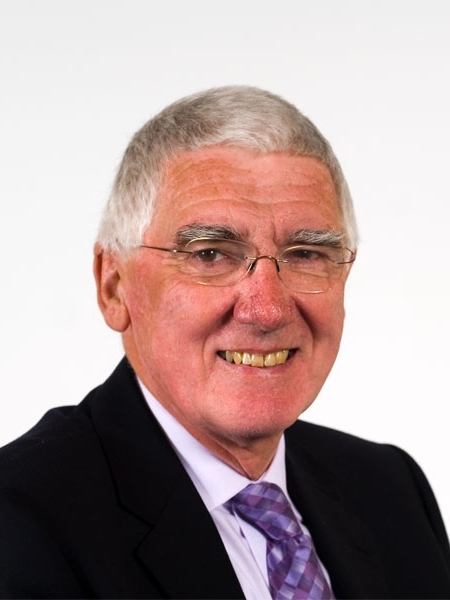
- Official portrait, 2007

Member of the Welsh Assembly for Aberconwy
- In office 3 May 2007 – 30 March 2011
- Preceded by: New Constituency
- Succeeded by: Janet Finch-Saunders
- Majority: 1,693 (8.2%)

Member of the Welsh Assembly for Conwy
- In office 6 May 1999 – 1 May 2003
- Preceded by: New Assembly
- Succeeded by: Denise Idris Jones

Personal details
- Born: 14 May 1939 (age 87) Blaenau Ffestiniog, Wales
- Party: Plaid Cymru (until 2018) Independent (since 2018)
- Education: Swansea University
- Occupation: Politician

Gareth Jones OBE (born 14 May 1939) is a Welsh politician. He was a member of the National Assembly for Wales for Conwy from 1999 until 2003 when he lost by 72 votes. He sought a successful re-election to the newly created Aberconwy constituency in 2007 before retiring in 2011. He was also Leader of Conwy County Borough Council, from 2017 to 2019, and a Llandudno town councillor representing the Craig-y-Don ward. He was formerly a member of Plaid Cymru, but left in 2017 after attempting to form a council administration in Conwy containing Welsh Conservatives, which the national party would not allow. He ran an independent administration of the council until 2019, when the Conservatives took control of the council.

In July 2007 he was elected Chair of the Assembly's new Enterprise and Learning Committee.

Prior to winning the Aberconwy constituency he was the cabinet member for finance and resources and the leader of the Plaid Cymru party group on Conwy County Borough Council.

== Personal ==
Gareth Jones was born in Blaenau Ffestiniog but now lives in Craig-y-Don, a suburb of Llandudno. A former headmaster of Ysgol John Bright, Llandudno's secondary school, he graduated with a BA from the University of Wales, Swansea. Gareth Jones' political interests include social justice, the Welsh language and education. His hobbies include reading and walking. His wife formerly owned a local bookshop.

== Political career ==
Between 1999 and 2003, Jones was a member of the National Assembly for Wales for the then constituency of Conwy and was Shadow Minister for Education and later chairman of the Education Committee. In the 2003 Assembly election, he lost his seat by the narrow margin of 72 votes to Labour's Denise Idris Jones amid allegations of electoral fraud by Royal Mail (after they failed to deliver some 11,000 of his electoral leaflets to parts of Llandudno and surrounding areas).

In 2007, in the new constituency of Aberconwy that was created following boundary changes, Jones defeated the Conservative candidate, Dylan Jones-Evans by a margin of 1,700 votes, as well as Denise Idris Jones who came in third place. Jones mainly campaigned in the run up to the election against potential downgrading of services at Ysbyty Llandudno hospital (as well as against the proposed Gwynt-y-Môr off-shore windfarm and for affordable housing). He stood with the ballot paper description Plaid Cymru - Save Llandudno Hospital. Following Jones's victory, the local Labour Party spokesperson described this as dishonest "scaremongering", claiming that the hospital was not under threat of closure under the incumbent Labour Welsh Assembly Government. Prior to winning the Aberconwy constituency he was the cabinet member for finance and resources and the leader of the Plaid Cymru party group on Conwy County Borough Council.

He has also held several posts within his political party, Plaid Cymru – the Party of Wales, including being a member of the National Executive Committee.

Prior to his re-election he was an active member of the Llandudno Hospital Action Group, and a Trustee of Llandudno's St David's Hospice. He remains a board member of Aberconwy Women's Aid and of the National Welsh Language and Heritage Centre at Nant Gwrtheyrn, Chair of Deganwy Chapel, and Patron of Tyddyn Bach, a respite centre for HIV patients and families in Penmaenmawr.

On 26 September 2010 Gareth Jones announced that he would not be standing for election in the 2011 National Assembly for Wales elections.

Jones was re-elected to Conwy County Borough Council in 2012, representing Craig-y-Don ward. In 2017, Jones was appointed Leader of Conwy County Borough Council, after the previous leader resigned, allegedly over failures to pay council tax. The 2017 Conwy County Borough Council elections were held shortly after, and no party was granted an overall majority on the council. Jones attempted to form an administration comprising all parties, due to the highly divided nature of the vote. Labour refused to participate, and Plaid Cymru's national party also refused the idea of the party working in co-operation with the Welsh Conservatives. Jones therefore left Plaid Cymru, and ran a minority administration of independents and Welsh Conservative councillors, with informal confidence and supply from the local Liberal Democrats. This lasted until 2019, when Jones was removed in a vote of no-confidence, and replaced by then councillor and later MS Sam Rowlands. Jones had sacked Rowlands from the council administration, for holding talks with other councillors and members of the administration about taking over the leadership of the council. Jones did not contest the 2022 Conwy County Borough Council elections.

== Offices held ==
Senedd
Preceded by (new post)	Assembly Member for Conwy; 1999 – 2003	Succeeded by Denise Idris Jones
Preceded by (new constituency)	Assembly Member for Aberconwy; 2007 – 2011	Succeeded by Janet Finch-Saunders
