= Iwan Huws =

Welsh environmental executive and politician

- Constituency: Aberconwy Candidate

Personal details
- Party: Plaid Cymru

Iwan Huws is a former executive of environmental governing bodies and political candidate.

Huws, from Y Felinheli, previously served as a chief executive of the Snowdonia National Park and as the Welsh director of the National Trust. In November 2010, Huws was selected as the Aberconwy constituency candidate for Plaid Cymru for the Welsh Assembly elections in May 2011. He was selected after the incumbent Plaid AM for Aberconwy, Gareth Jones, announced he would be standing down from the Assembly.

Huws was defeated by the Conservative candidate Janet Finch-Saunders, who gained the seat from Plaid Cymru with a majority of 1,567 votes. He finished in second place with 5,321 votes.
