= Eleanor Burnham =

Welsh Liberal Democrat politician

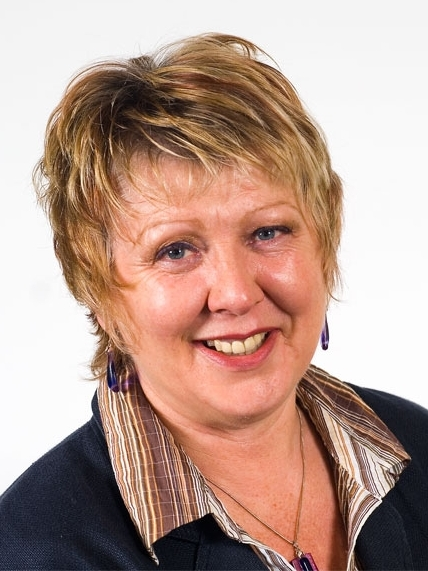
- Official portrait, 2007

Member of the Welsh Assembly for North Wales
- In office 22 March 2001 – 5 May 2011
- Preceded by: Christine Humphreys
- Succeeded by: Aled Roberts

Personal details
- Born: Wrexham, Wales
- Party: Welsh Liberal Democrats
- Spouse: Derek Burnham (div)

Eleanor Burnham is a Welsh Liberal Democrat politician who was a Member of the Welsh Assembly (AM) for North Wales from 2001 until 2011.

== Background ==
Burnham was born in Wrexham and brought up in Gwnodl Fawr, Cynwyd. Her early career was in social services management. She was previously a Wrexham Magistrate and a member of Denbigh Hospital Mental Health Tribunal. She has worked as a fundraiser for St. Kentigern Hospice, St. Asaph. A fluent Welsh speaker, Burnham is a qualified aromatherapist and her hobbies include gardening, cycling and swimming.

Burnham is an amateur singer who won a prize in the Soprano category at the Llangollen International Eisteddfod and is a former member of Mid Wales Opera. After leaving the Senedd, she competed in the "Voice of Wales" competition.

== Politics ==
Burnham succeeded as Liberal Democrat AM for North Wales on 22 March 2001 after Christine Humphreys had resigned because of ill-health. Burnham was the Welsh Liberal Democrat Assembly spokesperson on Culture, Welsh Language and Sport. Her political interests lie in full devolution for Wales, social inclusion and lifelong-learning. In this role she repeatedly challenged the Culture Minister, Alun Pugh, "to prove whether or not he can be the champion for the Welsh language".

After losing her seat in 2011, Burnham received a "resettlement grant" of £32,000, but commented that she did not think it was "morally correct" for AMs to receive the grants if they had other jobs to go to. She retrained as a teacher.

== Offices held ==
Senedd
Preceded by Christine Humphreys	Assembly Member for North Wales; 2001 – 2011	Succeeded by Aled Roberts
