= Arfon (Senedd constituency) =

Senedd constituency (2007–2026)

Coordinates: 53.083°N 4.042°W

- Former Senedd county constituency for the Senedd

- Arfon shown within the North Wales electoral region and the region shown within Wales

Former Senedd county constituency
- Created: 2007
- Abolished: 2026
- Party: Plaid Cymru
- MS: Siân Gwenllian
- Preserved county: Gwynedd
- Created from: Caernarfon and Conwy
- Replaced by: Bangor Conwy Môn

Arfon was a constituency of the Senedd. It was created for the former Assembly's 2007 election. It elected one Member of the Senedd by the first past the post method of election. Also, however, it was one of nine constituencies in the North Wales electoral region, which elects four additional members, in addition to nine constituency members, to produce a degree of proportional representation for the region as a whole.

== Boundaries ==
Map of 2007–2026 boundaries

The constituency had the boundaries of the Arfon Westminster constituency prior to the 2023 review of Westminster constituencies, entirely within the preserved county of Gwynedd. The new constituency merged areas currently within the Caernarfon constituency and the Conwy constituency. The Caernarfon constituency was entirely within the preserved county of Gwynedd. The Conwy constituency was partly a Gwynedd constituency and partly within the preserved county of Clwyd.

The North Wales region was created for the first Assembly election, in 1999. For the 2007 election, however, it had new boundaries. It included the constituencies of Aberconwy, Alyn and Deeside, Arfon, Clwyd South, Clwyd West, Delyn, Vale of Clwyd, Wrexham and Ynys Môn.

== Voting ==
In general elections for the Senedd, each voter had two votes. The first vote was used to vote for a candidate to become the Member of the Senedd for the voter's constituency, elected by the first past the post system. The second vote was used to vote for a regional closed party list of candidates. Additional member seats were allocated from the lists by the d'Hondt method, with constituency results being taken into account in the allocation.

== Assembly Members and Members of the Senedd ==
Election	Member	Party	Portrait
2007	constituency created; see Caernarfon and Conwy		
2007	Alun Ffred Jones	Plaid Cymru	
2016	Siân Gwenllian	Plaid Cymru	

== Elections ==
=== Elections in the 2020s ===
2021 Senedd election: Arfon
Party	Candidate	Constituency			Regional		
Party	Candidate	Votes	%	±%	Votes	%	±%
Plaid Cymru	Siân Gwenllian (Note: Incumbent member for this constituency)	13,760	63.3	+8.5	11,955	55.7	+5.4
Labour	Iwan Wyn Jones	5,108	23.5	-10.5	5,254	24.5	+0.3
Conservative	Tony Thomas	1,806	8.3	±0.0	1,925	9.0	+2.1
Liberal Democrats	Calum Davies	642	3.0	+0.1	448	2.1	-0.8
Reform UK	Andrew Haigh	350	1.6	New	188	0.9	New
Independent	Martin Bristow	82	0.4	New			
Green					865	4.0	+0.5
Abolish					403	1.9	-1.6
Gwlad					227	1.1	New
Freedom Alliance (UK)					72	0.3	New
Communist					63	0.3	±0.0
Propel					42	0.2	New
Independent	Michelle Brown				14	0.1	New
TUSC					13	0.1	New
Majority		8,652	39.8	+19.0			
Turnout		21,478	50.92	0.0			
Plaid Cymru hold		Swing					

=== Elections in the 2010s ===
Welsh Assembly Election 2016: Arfon
Party	Candidate	Constituency			Regional		
Party	Candidate	Votes	%	±%	Votes	%	±%
Plaid Cymru	Siân Gwenllian	10,962	54.8	-1.9	10,028	50.3	+2.8
Labour	Sion Jones	6,800	34.0	+7.8	4,831	24.2	-0.3
Conservative	Martin Peet	1,655	8.3	-4.2	1,369	6.9	-4.4
Liberal Democrats	Sara Lloyd Williams	577	2.9	-1.6	582	2.9	-0.8
UKIP					1,376	6.9	+4.0
Green					706	3.5	-0.9
Abolish					696	3.5	New
Monster Raving Loony					160	0.8	New
Association of Welsh Independents					94	0.5	New
Communist					61	0.3	-0.2
Mark Young - Independent					45	0.2	New
Majority		4,162	20.8	−9.7			
Turnout		19,994	50.9	+7.5			
Plaid Cymru hold		Swing	-4.9				

Welsh Assembly Election 2011: Arfon
Party	Candidate	Constituency			Regional		
Party	Candidate	Votes	%	±%	Votes	%	±%
Plaid Cymru	Alun Ffred Jones	10,024	56.7	+4.3	8,402	47.5	-6.6
Labour	Christina Rees	4,630	26.2	-0.6	4,327	24.5	+1.2
Conservative	Aled Davies	2,209	12.5	+3.0	1,994	11.3	+1.6
Liberal Democrats	Rhys Jones	801	4.5	-2.8	653	3.7	-1.7
Green					787	4.4	+0.3
UKIP					516	2.9	+0.6
Socialist Labour					480	2.7	+2.2
BNP					283	1.6	-0.8
Welsh Christian					103	0.6	-+0.2
Communist					85	0.5	±0.0
Weyman - Independent					59	0.3	New
Majority		5,394	30.5	+4.9			
Turnout		17,664	43.4	−5.7			
Plaid Cymru hold		Swing	+2.4				

Regional ballots rejected: 139

=== Elections in the 2000s ===
Welsh Assembly Election 2007: Arfon
Party	Candidate	Constituency			Regional		
Party	Candidate	Votes	%	±%	Votes	%	±%
Plaid Cymru	Alun Ffred Jones	10,260	52.4	N/A	10,042	54.1	N/A
Labour	Martin Eaglestone	5,242	26.8	N/A	4,547	23.3	N/A
Conservative	Gerry Frobisher	1,858	9.5	N/A	1,899	9.7	N/A
Liberal Democrats	Mel ab Owain	1,424	7.3	N/A	1,054	5.4	N/A
UKIP	Elwyn Williams	789	4.0	N/A	451	2.3	N/A
Green					791	4.1	N/A
BNP					460	2.4	New
Socialist Labour					93	0.5	N/A
Communist					88	0.5	N/A
Welsh Christian					86	0.4	N/A
CPA					11	0.1	N/A
Majority		5,018	25.6	N/A			
Turnout		19,573	49.1	N/A			
Plaid Cymru win (new seat)							
