= Aled Roberts =

Welsh politician (1962–2022)

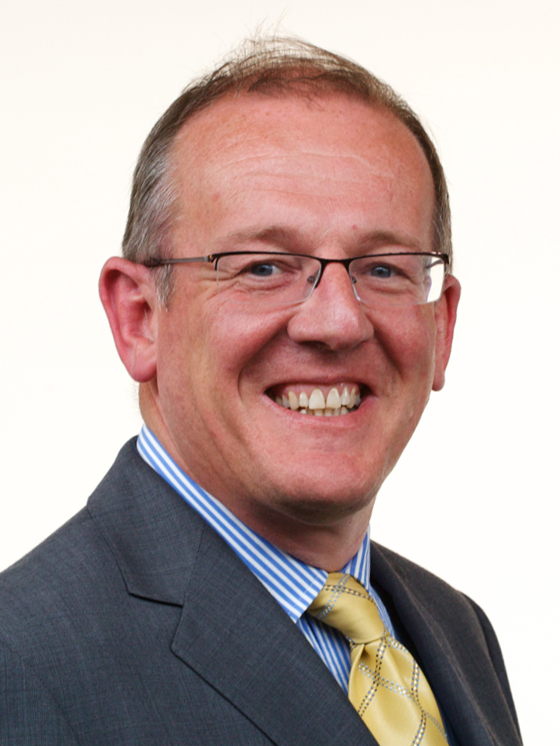
- Official portrait, 2011

Welsh Language Commissioner
- In office 1 April 2019 – 13 February 2022
- Preceded by: Meri Huws

Member of the Welsh Assembly for North Wales
- In office 5 May 2011 – 5 May 2016

Leader of Wrexham County Borough Council
- In office 2005–2011
- Preceded by: Neil Rogers
- Succeeded by: Ron Davies

Personal details
- Born: 17 May 1962 Rhosllanerchrugog, Wales
- Died: 13 February 2022 (aged 59)
- Party: Welsh Liberal Democrats
- Education: Aberystwyth University

Aled Rhys Roberts (17 May 1962 – 13 February 2022) was a Welsh Liberal Democrat politician from Rhosllanerchrugog, Wrexham. Roberts was a Member of the Welsh Assembly (AM) for the North Wales Region from 2011 to 2016. Before his election to the assembly, he was a councillor and the leader of Wrexham County Borough Council. He served as the Welsh Language Commissioner from 2019 until his death in 2022.

== Early life and career ==
Aled Rhys Roberts was born on 17 May 1962 to Gladwyn and Gwynhefin Roberts in Rhosllannerchrugog, Wrexham, Wales, which was where he was raised. A native speaker of Welsh, he was educated at Ysgol y Ponciau, Ysgol y Grango and Ysgol Rhiwabon and studied law at the University of Wales, Aberystwyth, where he graduated with a law degree in 1983. Following his studies, Roberts went on to practise as a solicitor in the areas of Mold, Wrexham and Ruthin before his entry to politics in 1991. During this period, he was a partner at Wrexham law firm Geoffrey Morris and Ashton.

== Political career ==
Roberts was first elected to Wrexham County Borough Council in 1991 for the Rhos and Ponciau ward. In 2003–2004 he served as Mayor of Wrexham. The council was under no overall control at the time, and in March 2005 he took over as leader of the council following the resignation of the Labour leader of the council. In the 2011 National Assembly for Wales election, Roberts was elected as an Assembly Member for North Wales. Upon his election to the Welsh Assembly, he resigned as leader of Wrexham Borough Council as he felt he could not devote time to both bodies, and he did not contest the council election for his former seat in 2012.

Video of Aled Roberts answering a question from a local school: "What was your first job?"

Shortly after Roberts' election as an AM, it was discovered that he was a member of the Valuation Tribunal for Wales, which was a proscribed body of which AMs were not allowed to be a member, because of a perceived conflict of interest. As a result, Roberts was disqualified from the Welsh Assembly. Roberts stated that he was following a Welsh language guidance document from the Electoral Commission. This document later emerged to have been incorrect, as while the English regulations had been updated in 2010, the Welsh document still gave information based on 2006 regulations. In July 2011, Roberts' disqualification was overturned by the Assembly on a 30–20 vote.

Roberts later went on to become the Welsh Liberal Democrats' Education spokesman.

For the 2016 National Assembly for Wales election, Roberts announced that he would be standing in the Clwyd South constituency. He came a distant fifth to Welsh Labour's Ken Skates, receiving 2,289 votes (10.3%). Roberts also sought re-election as the lead Liberal Democrat candidate on the regional list, but lost his seat to the UK Independence Party (UKIP).

In 2019, he was appointed by the Welsh Government as the Welsh Language Commissioner to promote the use of the Welsh language. In 2022, he considered opening an investigation into Monmouthshire County Council for adopting a policy of only printing signs in English, omitting Welsh.

== Death ==
Roberts died in office on 13 February 2022, at the age of 59. He was married and had two sons.
