= Global Entrepreneurship Monitor =

Assessment of entrepreneurial activity

The Global Entrepreneurship Monitor (GEM) is an ongoing research project that provides an annual assessment of the national level of entrepreneurial activity in multiple, diverse countries. It was started in 1999 by Babson College and the London Business School. The study counts the participation of 115 countries and with longitudinal data going back to 1999.

The GEM data has been a useful tool to influence national economic policies and a resource trusted by international organizations such as the United Nations, the World Economic Forum, the World Bank and the Organization for Economic Co-operation and Development (OECD).

== Data ==
All GEM data collection is centrally coordinated to ensure quality and reliability. The Adult Population Survey (APS) surveys at least 2000 adults for each country and explores the role of the individual in the lifecycle of the entrepreneurial process. The core of the APS has remained consistent over the years, providing a longitudinal perspective. The National Expert Survey (NES) is administered to a group of at least 36 business and academic experts in each country with the purpose of assessing how the local conditions enhance or hinder entrepreneurial activities.

Each year, the GEM releases an annual report that is downloadable from the official website and also a range of national and special topic reports that differ every year (e.g. women, social, family, senior, youth, high-growth, ethnic and immigrant).

== Model ==
The APS offers a number of different indicators, such as perceived opportunities rate, fear of failure rate, entrepreneurial intentions rate, motivational index, and more. GEM's most well-known index is called TEA (Total Early-Stage Entrepreneurial Activity), which assesses the percentage of 18-64 population both about to start an entrepreneurial activity (i.e. nascent entrepreneurs), or that have already started one with a lifespan of a maximum of 3 and a half years.

The GEM data from the NES uses nine factors that form the Entrepreneurial Framework Conditions (EFC) and include entrepreneurial aspirations, technical progress, GDP growth, and other macro economics variables.

The original GEM model was revised in 2008 to reflect the different stages of economic development that exist across nations and that arguably influence entrepreneurial activities. This new addition was based on Porter's typology of factor-driven economies, efficiency-driven economies and innovation-driven economies.
