= Dylan Jones-Evans =

British academic

Dylan Jones-Evans OBE FRSA
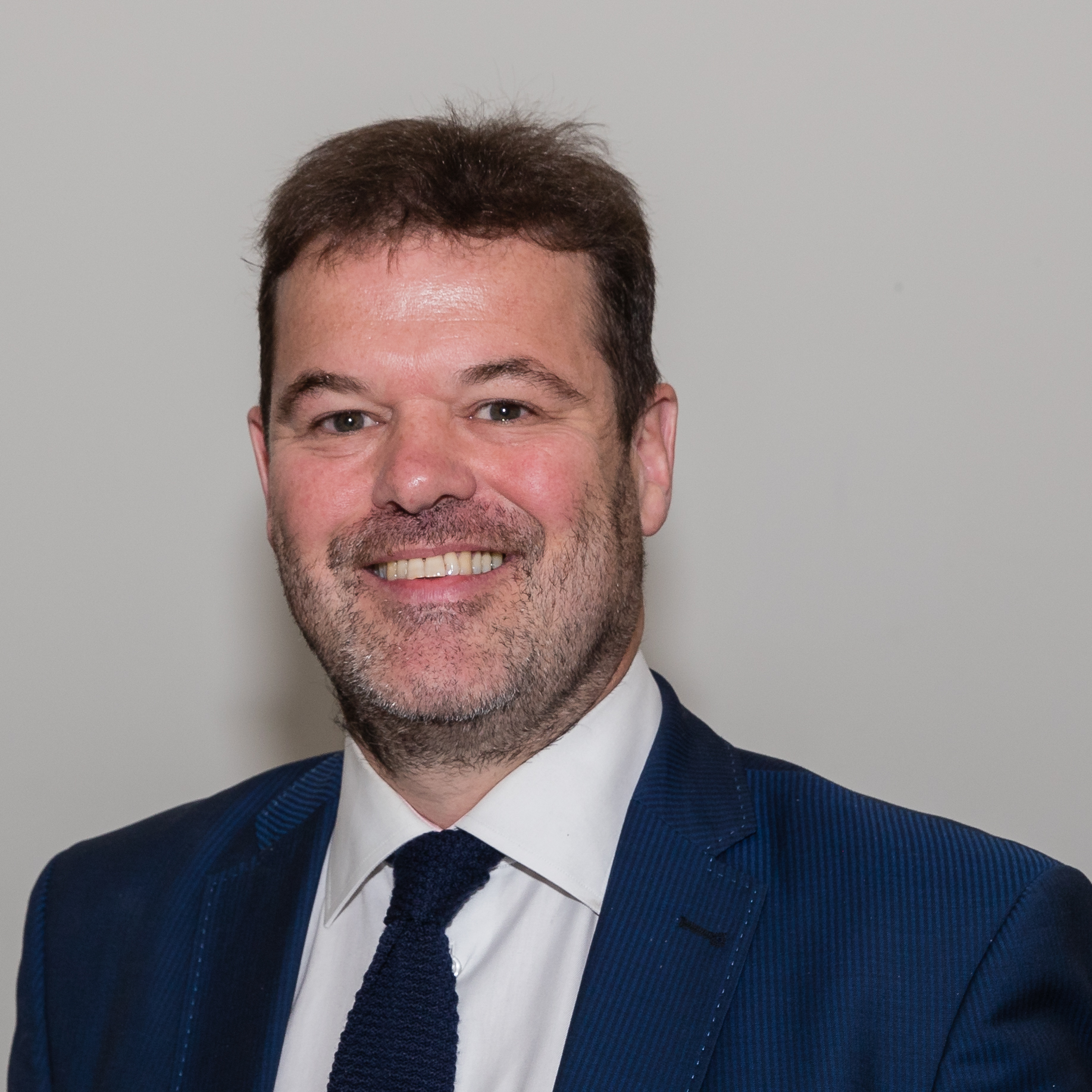
- Born: 16 May 1966 (age 60); Bangor, Gwynedd
- Education: University of Manchester; Aston University
- Occupations: Professor, newspaper columnist
- Employer: University of South Wales
- Board member of: Finance Wales; Institute of Small Business and Enterprise; Institute of Welsh Affairs; ICE; Wales Management Council; Institute of Directors Wales; Prime Cymru
- Website: bethespark.wales/meet-the-team/prof-dylan-jones-evans

Dylan Jones-Evans (born 16 May 1966) was born in Bangor, Gwynedd and brought up in Pwllheli on the Llyn Peninsula. He is currently Assistant Pro-Vice-Chancellor (Enterprise) and the chair in entrepreneurship at the University of South Wales. He is visiting professor of entrepreneurship at the University of Turku in Finland, newspaper columnist and the creator of the Wales Fast Growth 50, an annual barometer of entrepreneurial firms in Wales.

== Career ==
Following a BSc (Hons) in Physics, an MSc in Technical Change and Industrial Strategy from Manchester University, and a PhD in technology entrepreneurship from Aston University, Jones-Evans held postdoctoral posts at Durham University Business School and University College Dublin (as an EU Marie Curie Postdoctoral Fellow).

At the age of 29, he was appointed chair of entrepreneurship and small business management at the University of Glamorgan in 1996, where he set up the Welsh Enterprise Institute.

He has subsequently held academic chairs at the University of Wales Bangor and NEWI in Wrexham. He was Director of the National Entrepreneurship Observatory at Cardiff University for the period 2005–2008, Director of Enterprise and Innovation at the University of Wales 2008–2013 and Professor of Entrepreneurship and Strategy, Bristol Business School 2013–17. He has been chair of the Irish Research Council's postgraduate scholarship programmes, and was formerly a member of the Research, Innovation and Engagement Committee for the Higher Education Funding Council for Wales.

Jones-Evans has published over 100 articles within edited books, academic conference proceedings and refereed journals, including the Journal of Economic Geography, R&D Management, Entrepreneurship Theory and Practice, Small Business Economics, International Small Business Journal, Technovation and Regional Studies. Along with Professor Sara Carter, he is the co-author of the textbook Enterprise and Small Business.

He has initiated over £40 million of development projects, and has attracted research grants from the ESRC, the European Commission, the Leverhulme Trust and the Nuffield Foundation. One project was the first European transnational research study of the role of universities in technology transfer and spin-off activities in Europe.

He has worked as a consultant for the OECD, the European Union and other economic development bodies, and was the lead author of the Entrepreneurship Action Plan for Wales, the first regional enterprise strategy in the world. He led the Global Entrepreneurship Monitor (GEM) project in Wales for eight years and is currently a member of the "Be The Spark" panel, which has worked with the Massachusetts Institute of Technology to develop an entrepreneurship strategy for Wales on behalf of the Welsh Government. He also served as a member of the Business Advisory Panel for the Secretary of State for Wales between 2010 and 2014 and led a major review of business finance for the Welsh Government.

He was the first chairman of Outlook Expeditions Ltd, and has been a member of the boards of Finance Wales, the Institute of Small Business and Enterprise, the Institute of Welsh Affairs, ICE, the Wales Management Council, the Institute of Directors in Wales, Prime Cymru (one of the Prince of Wales' charities) and was Vice-President (UK) for the European Council of Small Business.

He is currently chairman of Town Square, which is developing facilities for entrepreneurs in the UK, and a trustee of Fabric, a social enterprise in Swansea helping homeless young people.

Jones-Evans has created number of events to promote and celebrate entrepreneurship in Wales including the Wales Fast Growth 50, the Cardiff Business Awards, Wales Start-Up Awards, and the Wales Legal Awards. He is a weekly columnist since 2004 in the Western Mail - where he compiles the annual lists of the Top 300 firms in Wales and the Wales Fast Growth 50 list of the fastest growing Welsh businesses - and the Daily Post, and is now a contributor to the online news site Business News Wales.

== Recent journal publications ==
- Klofsten, Magnus; Jones-Evans, Dylan; Pereira, Luciana (April 2021). "Teaching science and technology PhD students in entrepreneurship-potential learning opportunities and outcomes". The Journal of Technology Transfer. 46 (2): 319–334. doi:10.1007/s10961-020-09784-8.
- Pugh, Rhiannon; MacKenzie, Niall G.; Jones-Evans, Dylan (3 July 2018). "From 'Techniums' to 'emptiums': the failure of a flagship innovation policy in Wales" (PDF). Regional Studies. 52 (7): 1009–1020. Bibcode:2018RegSt..52.1009P. doi:10.1080/00343404.2018.1444272.
- Zhao, Tianshu; Jones-Evans, Dylan (18 October 2016). "SMEs, banks and the spatial differentiation of access to finance". Journal of Economic Geography lbw029. doi:10.1093/jeg/lbw029.
- Rhisiart, Martin; Jones-Evans, Dylan (January 2016). "The impact of foresight on entrepreneurship: The Wales 2010 case study". Technological Forecasting and Social Change. 102: 112–119. doi:10.1016/j.techfore.2015.03.010.
- Zhang, Qiantao; MacKenzie, Niall G.; Jones-Evans, Dylan; Huggins, Robert (October 2016). "Leveraging knowledge as a competitive asset? The intensity, performance and structure of universities' entrepreneurial knowledge exchange activities at a regional level". Small Business Economics. 47 (3): 657–675. doi:10.1007/s11187-016-9759-0.
- Jones-Evans, Dylan (2 January 2015). "Access to finance to SMEs at a regional level – the case of Finance Wales". Venture Capital. 17 (1–2): 27–41. doi:10.1080/13691066.2015.1052624.

== Development Bank of Wales ==
In 2013, he was asked by the Welsh Government to undertake a detailed review examining Access to Finance for small and medium-sized enterprises (SMEs) in Wales. The two reports produced by the review criticised the Welsh Government's former investment fund Finance Wales as being unfit for purpose, mainly because of the high interest rates charged to businesses and the unwillingness to consider using state aid rules to make finance affordable to Welsh firms. He recommended the creation of a new Development Bank to support funding for Welsh SMEs. He was subsequently appointed chair of the Development Bank of Wales' Task and Finish Group, which drew up a plan for the creation of this body by the Welsh Government. In May 2015, the National Assembly for Wales voted to call "on the Welsh Government to establish a Welsh Development Bank, as recognised in the report published by Professor Dylan Jones-Evans". The DBW was established in 2017.

== Richard Burton ==
Jones-Evans was responsible for starting a campaign in 2011 to raise funding to secure a star for Richard Burton on the Hollywood Walk of Fame. This was unveiled in Los Angeles on St David's Day, 1 March 2013.

== Honours ==
Jones-Evans was appointed Officer of the Order of the British Empire (OBE) in the 2013 Birthday Honours.
