= Janet Finch-Saunders =

Welsh Conservative politician

Janet Finch-Saunders MS
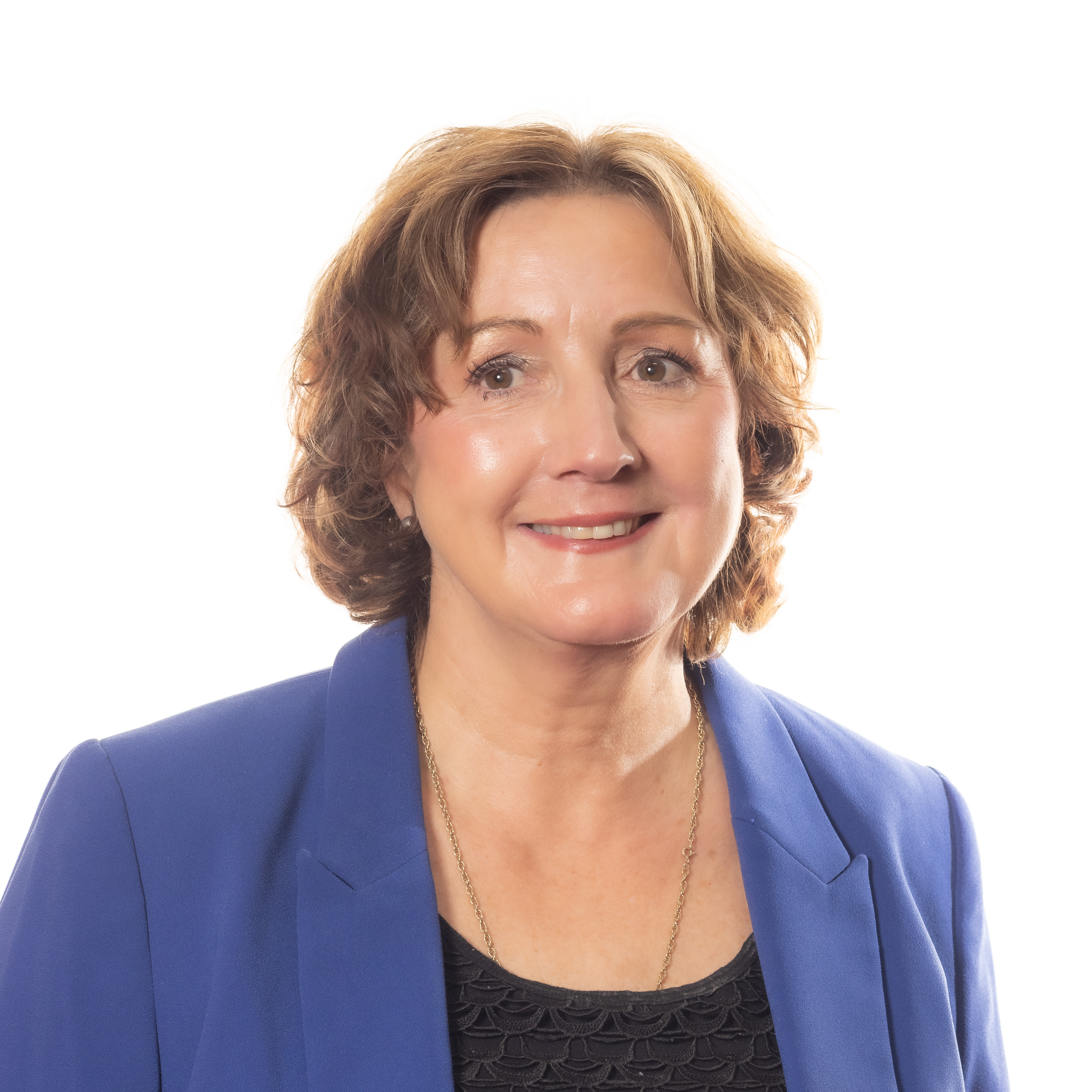
- Finch-Saunders in 2021

Member of the Senedd
- Incumbent
- Assumed office 6 May 2011
- Preceded by: Gareth Jones
- Constituency: Aberconwy (2011–2026); Bangor Conwy Môn (2026–)

Personal details
- Born: 28 April 1958 (age 68)
- Party: Conservative
- Spouse: Gareth D T Saunders
- Education: Llandrillo College
- Portfolio: Shadow Minister for Climate Change
- Website: http://janetfinchsaunders.org.uk/

Janet Elizabeth Finch-Saunders (born 1958) is a Welsh Conservative Party politician. She is Member of the Senedd (MS) for Bangor Conwy Môn, having previously served as MS for the Aberconwy constituency.

== Political career ==
Finch-Saunders previously represented the Craig-Y-Don ward on Llandudno Town Council, and Conwy County Borough Council. Elected in 2004, she was appointed to the Cabinet with overall responsibility for Community Safety and Public Protection matters. During her time as a Councillor, Finch-Saunders was Chair of the Principal Scrutiny Committee and Leader of the Welsh Conservative Group. In 2004, Finch-Saunders was elected as the Mayor of Llandudno, following in the footsteps of her parents.

In the 2003 Senedd election, Finch-Saunders stood unsuccessfully as the Conservative candidate for Wrexham and was third on the regional party list. In July 2010, following the first open primary selection to be held in the target seat of Aberconwy, Janet was selected as the Conservative Senedd candidate. In January 2011, she was appointed Policy Adviser by leader of the Welsh Conservatives. In this role she advised Nick Bourne AM on policy involving local government. She was subsequently elected as the Assembly Member for Aberconwy in the 2011 National Assembly for Wales election.

Finch-Saunders initiated the Cross-Party Group on Small Shops during the Fourth Assembly.

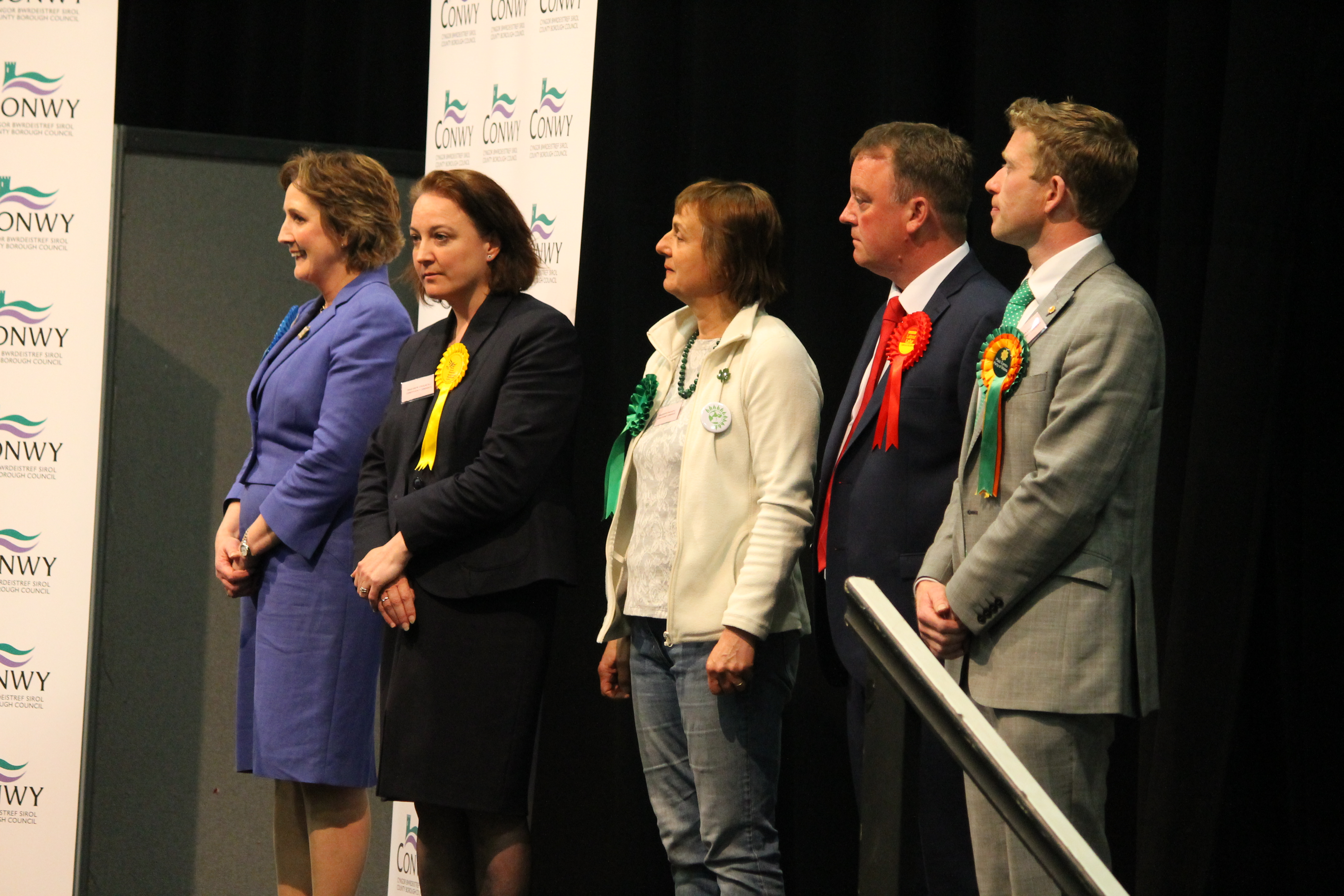
Aberconwy vote count at the 2016 Assembly election (L-R: Finch Saunders, Sarah Lesiter-Burgess, Petra Haig, Mike Priestley, Trystan Lewis)

In the 2016 Senedd election, Finch-Saunders retained her seat, becoming the first person to be re-elected consecutively since the constituency's inception. Finch-Saunders served as Shadow Cabinet Secretary for Local Government from 2011 to 2018, before becoming the party's Shadow Minister for Social Care, Children, Young People, and Older People.

During the fifth Senedd, she was the Chair of the Welsh Conservative Group in the Senedd. From July 2018 until January 2019, Finch-Saunders employed her husband as office manager. In 2019, Janet was elected Chair of the Petitions Committee. In 2020, Finch-Saunders was made the Shadow Minister for Environment, Energy and Rural Affairs.

In the 2021 Senedd election, Finch-Saunders held the seat with an increased majority of 3,336 and securing 41.69% of the vote. In May 2021, she was appointed as the Shadow Minister for Climate Change.

In the Sixth Senedd, she has been a member of the Climate Change, Environment and Infrastructure Committee, the Llywydd's Committee and the Senedd Commission. She is also a member of cross party groups on the Active Travel Act, Biodiversity, Clean Air, Fuel Poverty and Energy Efficiency, Hospice and Palliative Care, North Wales, Older People and Aging, Renewable and Low Carbon Energy, and Small Shops.

In the 2026 Senedd election, she was elected for the Bangor Conwy Môn constituency.

=== Allegations of Staff Mistreatment ===
In 2022, reports emerged that she had allegedly been mistreating her office staff, who were described as being "left in tears" and she is alleged to have phoned them if she felt they had taken too long while they were on the toilet. Finch Saunders has the highest turnover of staff of any elected member of the Senedd. As a consequence, WalesOnline journalist, Will Hayward, now keeps a running tally of when Janet begins hiring again on the Senedd website on his X (formerly Twitter) account.

== Personal life ==
Finch-Sanders lives in Llandudno and has two children with her husband, Gareth. An entrepreneur, Janet has founded a number of local businesses. A keen sailor, she is also passionate about animals and marine conservation.

Finch-Saunders owns 7 residential and 4 retail properties and is a trustee of a further two residential properties in Llandudno.

== Offices held ==
Senedd
Preceded by Gareth Jones	Member of the Senedd for Aberconwy; 2011–present	Incumbent
Political offices
Preceded by TBC	Shadow Minister for Local Government; 2011–2016	Succeeded by Siân Gwenllian
