= Jones shadow cabinet =

Shadow cabinet of Wales (2000–2007)

Jones Shadow Cabinet
- Shadow Cabinet of Wales
- 2000–2007
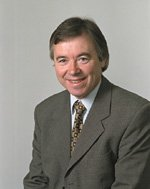
- Jones's official portrait, c. 2002
- Date formed: 9 August 2000
- Date dissolved: 19 July 2007

People and organisations
- Monarch: Elizabeth II
- Leader of the Opposition and Shadow First Minister (Note: Known as Shadow First Secretary before October 2000.): Ieuan Wyn Jones
- Deputy Leader of the Opposition: Rhodri Glyn Thomas (2003–2007)
- Member party: Plaid Cymru
- Status in legislature: Official Opposition

History
- Elections: 2003 assembly election 2007 assembly election
- Legislature terms: 1st National Assembly for Wales; 2nd National Assembly for Wales; 3rd National Assembly for Wales
- Predecessor: Shadow Cabinet of Dafydd Wigley
- Successor: Shadow Cabinet of Nick Bourne (shadow cabinet); Frontbench Team of Ieuan Wyn Jones (Plaid Cymru opposition frontbench; 2011)

Ieuan Wyn Jones became Leader of the Opposition in Wales after being elected as President of Plaid Cymru, the Official Opposition in the National Assembly for Wales, on 3 August 2000. Jones had previously served in these roles in an acting capacity on the behalf of his predecessor Dafydd Wigley from December 1999 to February 2000. He formed his shadow cabinet on 9 August and, like his predecessor, appointed himself Shadow First Secretary of Wales and Shadow Assembly Secretary for Finance. Members of his shadow cabinet were initially known as shadow assembly secretaries until October 2000. From that month, members were known as shadow ministers, with Jones's titles also changing to Shadow First Minister of Wales and Shadow Minister for Finance, after a similar change was made to the names of ministerial posts in Rhodri Morgan's coalition government between Labour and the Liberal Democrats. Jones's shadow cabinet was dissolved after the formation of a coalition government between Plaid Cymru and Morgan's Labour Party on 19 July 2007.

Jones introduced several new positions to the Shadow Cabinet, and in 2003 he appointed Rhodri Glyn Thomas as the first deputy leader of the opposition and Plaid Cymru. Jones's predecessor Dafydd Wigley was appointed to succeed Jones as Shadow Minister for Finance in 2001, serving in this role until 2003. After Plaid Cymru lost seats in the 2003 assembly election, Jones reshuffled his shadow cabinet and announced his intention to resign as party leader later in the year, though most shadow ministers stayed in the same posts. In September 2003, he resigned as President of Plaid Cymru but won another leadership election for the position of Leader of the Plaid Cymru Group in the National Assembly. He therefore remained Leader of the Opposition despite resigning from the overall party leadership. Jones reshuffled his shadow cabinet again in November 2003, making several changes to its composition. He made a "mini-reshuffle" in November 2005 because of structural changes to the committee system of the National Assembly, making minor changes to the Shadow Cabinet's composition.

In 2006, Plaid Cymru's leadership was restructured and Jones was elected to serve again as the overall leader of the party. After the 2007 assembly election, he entered into negotiations with Nick Bourne's Conservatives and Mike German's Liberal Democrats to form a coalition government. After these negotiations fell through, Jones negotiated an alternative coalition deal with Rhodri Morgan's Labour Party, forming a coalition government in July 2007 and becoming Deputy First Minister of Wales. Plaid Cymru became a party of government, leaving Bourne's Conservative Party to form the Official Opposition as the second largest non-governing party. Bourne became Leader of the Opposition and formed a new shadow cabinet; Plaid Cymru left government after the 2011 assembly election but did not become the Official Opposition again until after the 2016 assembly election, when it superseded the Conservative Party as the second largest party in the assembly.

== Background ==
Plaid Cymru politician Ieuan Wyn Jones was elected Assembly Member (AM) for Ynys Môn in the 1999 National Assembly for Wales election, the first election to the devolved legislature since a referendum enabled its creation in 1997. In May 1999, Plaid Cymru AMs elected Jones to the Shadow Cabinet of Dafydd Wigley as Opposition Chief Whip and Shadow Trefnydd/Business Manager. In December 1999, Wigley took a leave of absence due to ill health and delegated his shadow ministerial responsibilities to Jones, who served as the acting leader of the opposition and the Plaid Cymru Group in the National Assembly during his absence.

In February 2000, Wigley resumed his duties in the Shadow Cabinet. However, in May he announced his decision to permanently resign as leader for health reasons. Jones stood in the leadership election to succeed him as President of Plaid Cymru and was elected president on 3 August 2000. As the new assembly group leader of Plaid Cymru, the Official Opposition in the National Assembly for Wales, Jones succeeded Wigley as Leader of the Opposition. As Leader of the Opposition, he was expected to form a new shadow cabinet to scrutinise First Secretary Rhodri Morgan and his devolved Labour government.

== History ==
=== First National Assembly ===
Jones formed his new shadow cabinet on 9 August, following his election to the Plaid Cymru leadership. Jones personally appointed its members, unlike in the previous shadow cabinet where members were elected to their positions by Plaid Cymru's 17 AMs. Jones retained Wigley's portfolios as Leader of the Opposition, including the posts of Shadow Assembly Secretary for Finance and Shadow First Secretary. Jocelyn Davies joined the Shadow Cabinet as Shadow Trefnydd/Business Manager, the post held by Jones in the previous shadow cabinet. Elin Jones became the Opposition Chief Whip and Shadow Assembly Secretary for Agriculture and Rural Development, replacing the previous shadow agriculture secretary Rhodri Glyn Thomas, who left the Shadow Cabinet. Jones's leadership opponent Helen Mary Jones became Shadow Assembly Secretary for the Environment, Transport, Planning and Equal Opportunities. Dai Lloyd, Gareth Jones, Phil Williams and Cynog Dafis retained their roles as Shadow Assembly Secretary for Health and Social Services, Shadow Assembly Secretary for Education and Childcare, Shadow Assembly Secretary for Economic Development and Plaid Cymru Policy Co-ordinator in the Welsh Assembly respectively, with Dafis also possibly becoming Shadow Assembly Secretary for Education and Training. (Note: Cynog Dafis's appointment as Shadow Assembly Secretary for Education and Training is disputed; BBC News claims that Dafis was appointed as Shadow Assembly Secretary for Education and Training to the Shadow Cabinet in August 2000 while the Institute of Welsh Affairs claims that Jones did not appoint anyone to the role in anticipation of its merger with the education and childcare portfolio in the first government of Rhodri Morgan. The 2001 edition of Dod's Parliamentary Companion does not list Dafis as holding the role; he is only listed as Plaid Cymru Policy Co-ordinator in the Welsh Assembly.) Janet Ryder became Shadow Assembly Secretary for Local Government, Housing and Social Inclusion. Jones also introduced the new roles of Opposition Deputy Whip and Shadow Assembly Secretary for Small Businesses, which were given to Brian Hancock, Shadow Assembly Secretary for Culture, the Welsh Language and Sport, which was given to Owen John Thomas, and Shadow Assembly Secretary for the Valleys, which was given to Geraint Davies. Jones also offered his predecessor Wigley a place in the Shadow Cabinet, but he refused so he could continue to focus on his recovering health.

Following the formation of Rhodri Morgan's coalition government with Mike German's Liberal Democrats in October 2000, Jones renamed the roles in his shadow cabinet by replacing the term shadow assembly secretary with shadow minister; the coalition had decided to rename ministerial roles in the Cabinet by replacing the term assembly secretary with minister. (Note: Members of the Shadow Cabinet were also known as spokespeople both before and after this change occurred.) Jones's role as Shadow First Secretary was also renamed Shadow First Minister. The education portfolio in the Shadow Cabinet was also combined as Shadow Minister for Education and Lifelong Learning and given to Helen Mary Jones. In October 2001, Jones relinquished his role as Shadow Minister for Finance and appointed his predecessor Dafydd Wigley to succeed him in the role. Wigley dismissed the notion of challenging Jones for the Plaid Cymru leadership, explaining that becoming leader for a third time would be detrimental to his health. No other changes were made to the Shadow Cabinet.

=== Second National Assembly ===
Jones reshuffled his Shadow Cabinet in the aftermath of the 2003 assembly election, which returned 12 seats for Plaid Cymru, a net loss of five seats for the party. He had pledged to resign as party leader after a leadership election later in the year, leading to the expectation that this was likely his last reshuffle. He appointed Rhodri Glyn Thomas as his deputy, making him the first deputy leader of Plaid Cymru and the opposition. Most shadow portfolios were retained by their previous holders, (Note: Dafydd Wigley, the previous Shadow Minister for Finance, Phil Williams, the previous Shadow Minister for Economic Development, Geraint Davies, the previous Shadow Minister for the Valleys, Brian Hancock, the previous Opposition Deputy Whip and Shadow Minister for Small Businesses, and Cynog Dafis, the previous Plaid Cymru Policy Co-ordinator in the Welsh Assembly, stood down from the assembly at the 2003 election.) with new appointments including Elin Jones as Shadow Minister for Economic Development, Alun Ffred Jones as Shadow Minister for Finance and Leanne Wood as Shadow Minister for Social Justice and Regeneration.

While resigning from the overall party leadership of Plaid Cymru, Jones still stood as a candidate for the leadership of the party group in the National Assembly, winning against challenger Helen Mary Jones in a leadership contest held in September. Jones remained Leader of the Opposition as Leader of the Plaid Cymru Group in the National Assembly and reshuffled his shadow cabinet again in November 2003. Helen Mary Jones became Shadow Minister for the Environment, Planning and Countryside while Dai Lloyd, another alleged plotter for the leadership, became Shadow Minister for Finance, Local Government and Public Services, a role which Ieuan Wyn Jones publicised as "effectively Shadow Chancellor" of Wales. He also became Chair of the Plaid Cymru Group in the National Assembly while Helen Mary Jones became the assembly spokesperson for Plaid Cymru's Parliament for Wales campaign. Alun Ffred Jones moved from the finance portfolio to a party role as Leader of the Local Government Election Campaign, the campaign manager for Plaid's 2004 local election campaign; he remained in this position after the elections were held. Janet Ryder succeeded Helen Mary Jones as Shadow Minister for Education and Lifelong Learning while deputy leader Rhodri Glyn Thomas became Shadow Minister for Health and Social Services. Janet Davies became Opposition Chief Whip and Shadow Minister for Transport. Elin Jones, Owen John Thomas and Leanne Wood retained their previous shadow ministerial roles in the Shadow Cabinet.

Jones made a "mini-reshuffle" to his shadow cabinet in November 2005 because of structural changes to the committee system of the National Assembly. Rhodri Glyn Thomas remained deputy leader, but lost his health portfolio to Helen Mary Jones. Alun Ffred Jones became Shadow Minister for Economic Development, succeeding Elin Jones who became Shadow Minister for the Environment, Planning and Countryside. Leanne Wood retained her previous portfolio and also became Shadow Minister for Equal Opportunities. Ieuan Wyn Jones said he put these changes forward to the Plaid Cymru assembly group, who gave them unanimous approval. In February 2006, the leadership of Plaid Cymru was restructured, with Ieuan Wyn Jones elected overall leader of the party. Shadow ministers Owen John Thomas and Janet Davies retired from the National Assembly at the 2007 assembly election.

=== Dissolution ===
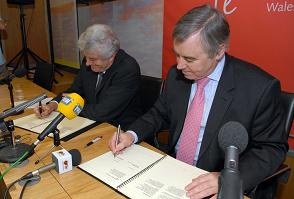
Jones and Rhodri Morgan (left) sign the One Wales coalition agreement between Plaid Cymru and Welsh Labour in 2007

After Plaid Cymru won 15 seats at the 2007 assembly election, Jones began negotiations with Nick Bourne of the Conservative Party and Mike German of the Liberal Democrats to form a coalition government and topple Rhodri Morgan's Labour government. An agreement was negotiated where Jones would become First Minister of Wales and lead a cabinet with nine members, including four Plaid Cymru AMs, three Conservative AMs and two Liberal Democrat AMs. The Conservatives and Liberal Democrats would each appoint a deputy first minister who would serve on an equal footing with one another. Plaid Cymru had also negotiated an alternative confidence and supply agreement with Labour but suspended negotiations after the Plaid assembly group approved the agreement with the Conservatives and the Liberal Democrats. The Conservatives also backed the coalition. A meeting of the Welsh Liberal Democrat executive on 22 May failed to approve the agreement with a tied vote, leading to a last-minute collapse of the agreement. Plaid resumed negotiations with Labour and on 19 July they formed the One Wales coalition government with Jones as Morgan's Deputy First Minister in a cabinet made up of three Plaid Cymru AMs and seven Labour AMs. Plaid Cymru became a party of government for the first time in its history, leaving opposition.

After the formation of the coalition government between Plaid Cymru and Labour, the Conservative Party led by Nick Bourne became the second largest party in the National Assembly not in government and therefore formed the new official opposition. Bourne formed a new shadow cabinet and became Leader of the Opposition. Although Plaid Cymru left government following the 2011 assembly election, it did not regain its status as the official opposition as the Conservatives superseded it as the second largest party, having won more seats at the election. The Conservatives remained the official opposition until 2016, when Plaid Cymru superseded it as the second largest party after the 2016 assembly election and formed a new shadow cabinet under leader Leanne Wood.

== Members ==
=== August–October 2000 ===
Portfolio	Shadow Minister	Constituency	Term
Leader of the Opposition; Leader of Plaid Cymru (Note: As President of Plaid Cymru from 2000 to 2003, Leader of the Plaid Cymru Group in the National Assembly for Wales from 2003 to 2006, and Leader of Plaid Cymru from 2006.); Shadow First Secretary	Ieuan Wyn Jones AM	Ynys Môn	August 2000–July 2007
Shadow Assembly Secretary for Finance	Ieuan Wyn Jones AM	Ynys Môn	August 2000–October 2001
Shadow Trefnydd/Business Manager	Jocelyn Davies AM	South Wales East	August 2000–May 2003
Shadow Assembly Secretary for the Environment, Transport, Planning and Equal Opportunities	Helen Mary Jones AM	Llanelli	August 2000–May 2003
Plaid Cymru Policy Co-ordinator in the Welsh Assembly	Cynog Dafis AM	Mid and West Wales	May 1999–May 2003 (Note: This shadow minister also served in this position in the Shadow Cabinet of Dafydd Wigley.)
Shadow Assembly Secretary for Education and Training (disputed)	Cynog Dafis AM	Mid and West Wales	August–October 2000
Shadow Assembly Secretary for Economic Development	Phil Williams AM	South Wales East	May 1999–May 2003
Shadow Assembly Secretary for Education and Childcare	Gareth Jones AM	Conwy	May 1999–October 2000
Shadow Assembly Secretary for Agriculture and Rural Development; Opposition Chief Whip	Elin Jones AM	Ceredigion	August 2000–May 2003
Shadow Assembly Secretary for Local Government, Housing and Social Inclusion	Janet Ryder AM	North Wales	August 2000–May 2003
Shadow Assembly Secretary for Health and Social Services	Dai Lloyd AM	South Wales West	May 1999–May 2003
Opposition Deputy Whip; Shadow Assembly Secretary for Small Businesses	Brian Hancock AM	Islwyn	August 2000–May 2003
Shadow Assembly Secretary for Culture, the Welsh Language and Sport	Owen John Thomas AM	South Wales Central	August 2000–May 2003
Shadow Assembly Secretary for the Valleys	Geraint Davies AM	Rhondda	August 2000–May 2007

=== October 2000–May 2003 ===
Portfolio	Shadow Minister	Constituency	Term
Leader of the Opposition; Leader of Plaid Cymru; Shadow First Minister	Ieuan Wyn Jones AM	Ynys Môn	August 2000–July 2007
Shadow Minister for Finance	Ieuan Wyn Jones AM	Ynys Môn	August 2000–October 2001
Shadow Minister for Finance	Dafydd Wigley AM	Caernarfon	October 2001–May 2003
Shadow Trefnydd/Business Manager	Jocelyn Davies AM	South Wales East	August 2000–May 2003
Shadow Minister for the Environment, Transport, Planning and Equal Opportunities	Helen Mary Jones AM	Llanelli	August 2000–May 2003
Shadow Minister for Education and Lifelong Learning	Helen Mary Jones AM	Llanelli	October 2000–May 2003
Plaid Cymru Policy Co-ordinator in the Welsh Assembly	Cynog Dafis AM	Mid and West Wales	May 1999–May 2003
Shadow Minister for Economic Development	Phil Williams AM	South Wales East	May 1999–May 2003
Shadow Minister for Agriculture and Rural Development; Opposition Chief Whip	Elin Jones AM	Ceredigion	August 2000–May 2003
Shadow Minister for Local Government, Housing and Social Inclusion	Janet Ryder AM	North Wales	August 2000–May 2003
Shadow Minister for Health and Social Services	Dai Lloyd AM	South Wales West	May 1999–May 2003
Opposition Deputy Whip; Shadow Minister for Small Businesses	Brian Hancock AM	Islwyn	August 2000–May 2003
Shadow Minister for Culture, the Welsh Language and Sport	Owen John Thomas AM	South Wales Central	August 2000–May 2007
Shadow Minister for the Valleys	Geraint Davies AM	Rhondda	August 2000–May 2003

==== Changes ====
- In October 2001, Ieuan Wyn Jones appointed his predecessor Dafydd Wigley to the Shadow Cabinet, giving him his portfolio as Shadow Minister for Finance.

=== May–November 2003 ===
Portfolio	Shadow Minister	Constituency	Term
Leader of the Opposition; Leader of Plaid Cymru; Shadow First Minister	Ieuan Wyn Jones AM	Ynys Môn	August 2000–July 2007
Deputy Leader of the Opposition; Deputy Leader of Plaid Cymru	Rhodri Glyn Thomas AM	Carmarthen East and Dinefwr	May 2003–July 2007
Shadow Minister for Finance	Alun Ffred Jones AM	Caernarfon	May 2003–November 2003
Shadow Trefnydd/Business Manager	Jocelyn Davies AM	South Wales East	August 2000–July 2007
Shadow Minister for the Environment, Transport, Planning and Equal Opportunities	Helen Mary Jones AM	Llanelli	August 2000–November 2003
Shadow Minister for Education and Lifelong Learning	Helen Mary Jones AM	Llanelli	October 2000–November 2003
Shadow Minister for Agriculture and Rural Development	Elin Jones AM	Ceredigion	August 2000–July 2007
Opposition Chief Whip	Elin Jones AM	Ceredigion	August 2000–November 2003
Shadow Minister for Economic Development	Elin Jones AM	Ceredigion	May 2003–November 2005
Shadow Minister for Local Government, Housing and Social Inclusion	Janet Ryder AM	North Wales	August 2000–November 2003
Shadow Minister for Health and Social Services	Dai Lloyd AM	South Wales West	May 1999–November 2003
Shadow Minister for Social Justice and Regeneration	Leanne Wood AM	South Wales Central	May 2003–July 2007
Shadow Minister for Culture, the Welsh Language and Sport	Owen John Thomas AM	South Wales Central	August 2000–May 2007

==== Changes ====
In September 2003, Ieuan Wyn Jones resigned as President of Plaid Cymru but was elected in a leadership election to continue serving as Leader of the Plaid Cymru Group in the National Assembly for Wales, so he remained Leader of the Opposition.

=== November 2003–November 2005 ===
Portfolio	Shadow Minister	Constituency	Term
Leader of the Opposition; Leader of Plaid Cymru; Shadow First Minister	Ieuan Wyn Jones AM	Ynys Môn	August 2000–July 2007
Deputy Leader of the Opposition; Deputy Leader of Plaid Cymru	Rhodri Glyn Thomas AM	Carmarthen East and Dinefwr	May 2003–July 2007
Shadow Minister for Health and Social Services	Rhodri Glyn Thomas AM	Carmarthen East and Dinefwr	November 2003–November 2005
Chair of the Plaid Cymru Group in the National Assembly; Shadow Minister for Finance, Local Government and Public Services	Dai Lloyd AM	South Wales West	November 2003–July 2007
Shadow Trefnydd/Business Manager	Jocelyn Davies AM	South Wales East	August 2000–July 2007
Plaid Cymru Assembly Spokesperson for the Parliament for Wales Campaign	Helen Mary Jones AM	Llanelli	November 2003–July 2007
Shadow Minister for the Environment, Planning and Countryside	Helen Mary Jones AM	Llanelli	November 2003–November 2005
Shadow Minister for Education and Lifelong Learning	Janet Ryder AM	North Wales	November 2003–July 2007
Shadow Minister for Agriculture and Rural Development	Elin Jones AM	Ceredigion	August 2000–July 2007
Shadow Minister for Economic Development	Elin Jones AM	Ceredigion	May 2003–November 2005
Shadow Minister for Transport; Opposition Chief Whip	Janet Davies AM	South Wales West	November 2003–May 2007
Leader of the Local Government Election Campaign	Alun Ffred Jones AM	Caernarfon	November 2003–November 2005
Shadow Minister for Social Justice and Regeneration	Leanne Wood AM	South Wales Central	May 2003–July 2007
Shadow Minister for Culture, the Welsh Language and Sport	Owen John Thomas AM	South Wales Central	August 2000–May 2007

=== November 2005–July 2007 ===
Portfolio	Shadow Minister	Constituency	Term
Leader of the Opposition; Leader of Plaid Cymru; Shadow First Minister	Ieuan Wyn Jones AM	Ynys Môn	August 2000–July 2007
Deputy Leader of the Opposition; Deputy Leader of Plaid Cymru	Rhodri Glyn Thomas AM	Carmarthen East and Dinefwr	May 2003–July 2007
Chair of the Plaid Cymru Group in the National Assembly; Shadow Minister for Finance, Local Government and Public Services	Dai Lloyd AM	South Wales West	November 2003–July 2007
Shadow Trefnydd/Business Manager	Jocelyn Davies AM	South Wales East	August 2000–July 2007
Plaid Cymru Assembly Spokesperson for the Parliament for Wales Campaign	Helen Mary Jones AM	Llanelli	November 2003–July 2007
Shadow Minister for Health and Social Services	Helen Mary Jones AM	Llanelli	November 2005–July 2007
Shadow Minister for Education and Lifelong Learning	Janet Ryder AM	North Wales	November 2003–July 2007
Shadow Minister for Agriculture and Rural Development	Elin Jones AM	Ceredigion	August 2000–July 2007
Shadow Minister for the Environment, Planning and Countryside	Elin Jones AM	Ceredigion	November 2005–July 2007
Shadow Minister for Transport; Opposition Chief Whip	Janet Davies AM	South Wales West	November 2003–May 2007
Shadow Minister for Economic Development	Alun Ffred Jones AM	Caernarfon (2005–2007); Arfon (2007)	November 2005–July 2007
Shadow Minister for Social Justice and Regeneration	Leanne Wood AM	South Wales Central	May 2003–July 2007
Shadow Minister for Equal Opportunities	Leanne Wood AM	South Wales Central	November 2005–July 2007
Shadow Minister for Culture, the Welsh Language and Sport	Owen John Thomas AM	South Wales Central	August 2000–May 2007

==== Changes ====
- In February 2006, Ieuan Wyn Jones was elected as the overall leader of Plaid Cymru.
- Janet Davies and Owen John Thomas retired from the National Assembly at the 2007 assembly election in May 2007.

== See also ==
- Interim Morgan administration
- First Morgan government
- Second Morgan government
- Second Frontbench Team of Mike German
