= Wigley shadow cabinet =

Shadow cabinet of Wales (1999–2000)

Wigley Shadow Cabinet
- Shadow Cabinet of Wales
- 1999–2000
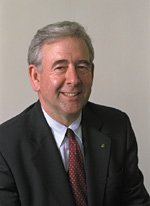
- Date formed: 18 May 1999
- Date dissolved: 4 August 2000

People and organisations
- Monarch: Elizabeth II
- Leader of the Opposition and Shadow First Secretary: Dafydd Wigley (Note: Wigley delegated his responsibilities to Ieuan Wyn Jones from December 1999 to February 2000 due to ill health.)
- Member party: Plaid Cymru
- Status in legislature: Official Opposition

History
- Legislature term: 1st National Assembly for Wales
- Predecessor: Assembly established
- Successor: Shadow Cabinet of Ieuan Wyn Jones

Dafydd Wigley became Leader of the Opposition and Shadow First Secretary of Wales after the creation of the National Assembly for Wales on 12 May 1999, following the first assembly election held on 6 May. Members of his shadow cabinet were elected by Plaid Cymru's assembly members and announced on 18 May.

In December 1999, Wigley temporarily delegated his responsibilities to Ieuan Wyn Jones due to ill health, who became acting leader of the opposition and Plaid Cymru. He resumed his responsibilities in February 2000 but later announced his resignation in May 2000 to focus on his health. In August 2000, Jones was elected to succeed him as Plaid Cymru's leader, becoming the new Leader of the Opposition and forming a new shadow cabinet.

== Background ==
Dafydd Wigley was elected unopposed as President of Plaid Cymru in the 1991 Plaid Cymru presidential election, having previously served as the president of the party from 1981 to 1984. Plaid Cymru, a party traditionally supportive of Welsh independence, campaigned for the establishment of a devolved Welsh legislature in the 1990s with the Labour Party and the Liberal Democrats. After UK Labour formed a government following the 1997 UK general election, it held a referendum in Wales on establishing a devolved Welsh assembly, which returned a narrow majority in favour of establishing an assembly. The first election to the National Assembly for Wales was held on 6 May 1999, and it met for the first time on 12 May 1999.

At the election in May 1999, Plaid Cymru made gains against Labour, which had traditionally dominated Welsh politics, winning 17 seats and causing Labour to unexpectedly fall short of an overall majority. Labour became the largest party in the assembly with 28 assembly members (AMs) and formed a minority administration with its leader Alun Michael elected as the inaugural First Secretary of Wales at the first plenary session of the National Assembly on 12 May. Michael announced his cabinet at the same session, appointing nine Labour AMs to serve as ministers, officially known as assembly secretaries, in the devolved government of Wales.

As the second largest party in the assembly with 17 AMs, Plaid Cymru formed the official opposition to the Labour administration, enabling it to act as a government-in-waiting in accordance with the Westminster system of government traditionally practiced across the United Kingdom. Wigley was elected as AM for Caernarfon and became the first Leader of the Opposition of Wales as the leader of Plaid Cymru in the assembly. As the official opposition in the assembly, Plaid Cymru was expected to scrutinise the policies and governance of the devolved administration, propose alternative policies and lead assembly debates. To fulfill these duties, Wigley was expected to form and lead a shadow cabinet made up of shadow ministers who would mirror the roles of devolved ministers in the Welsh Cabinet and lead the party in scrutinising the Labour administration and its ministers. The two other opposition parties, the Conservatives and Liberal Democrats, announced their frontbench teams on 13 May 1999. Wigley said he would announce his shadow cabinet on 18 May, at the second plenary session of the National Assembly. He did not personally appoint the members of the shadow cabinet like other party leaders; members were instead elected to their positions by Plaid Cymru's seventeen AMs.

== History ==
On 18 May, the members of the Shadow Cabinet were announced. Wigley was elected as Shadow First Secretary and Shadow Assembly Secretary for Finance. Other elections to the Shadow Cabinet included Ynys Môn AM Ieuan Wyn Jones as Shadow Trefnydd/Business Manager and Opposition Chief Whip, Llanelli AM Helen Mary Jones as Shadow Assembly Secretary for Social Inclusion and Equal Opportunity, Mid and West Wales AM Cynog Dafis as Plaid Cymru Policy Co-ordinator in the Welsh Assembly, South Wales East AM Phil Williams as Shadow Assembly Secretary for Economic Development, Conwy AM Gareth Jones as Shadow Assembly Secretary for Education and Childcare, Ceredigion AM Elin Jones as Shadow Assembly Secretary for Education and Training, Carmarthen East and Dinefwr AM Rhodri Glyn Thomas as Shadow Assembly Secretary for Agriculture and Rural Development, North Wales AM Janet Ryder as Shadow Assembly Secretary for the Environment, Local Government and Planning, and South Wales West AM Dai Lloyd as Shadow Assembly Secretary for Health and Social Services. Unlike the nine-member Labour cabinet led by First Secretary Alun Michael, the Shadow Cabinet had ten members; Helen Mary Jones took on a shadow portfolio for social inclusion and equal opportunity, which did not have an equivalent in Michael's administration.

In December 1999, Wigley had to undergo a minor heart surgery operation due to a heart condition and ill health. In response, he introduced a new deputy leadership role, although an officeholder was never appointed to actually fill the position. He temporarily resigned from his duties while he recovered, delegating his responsibilities to Ieuan Wyn Jones, who was elected unopposed by the Plaid Cymru assembly group to serve as the acting leader of the party during his absence. Wigley returned to his duties in February 2000 after being granted permission to return to work from his doctors, leading his party into the premiership of Labour's Rhodri Morgan. In May 2000, Wigley announced his decision to resign as President of Plaid Cymru after recovering slower than he had expected and being told to reduce his workload by medical advisers. Jones was elected to succeed him in a leadership election held in August, becoming the new Leader of the Opposition and forming a new shadow cabinet. Jones offered Wigley a place in the new shadow cabinet, but Wigley refused so he could continue to focus on his recovering health.

== Members ==
Portfolio	Shadow Minister	Constituency	Term
Leader of the Opposition; President of Plaid Cymru; Shadow First Secretary; Shadow Assembly Secretary for Finance	Dafydd Wigley AM	Caernarfon	May 1999–August 2000
Shadow Trefnydd/Business Manager; Opposition Chief Whip	Ieuan Wyn Jones AM (Note: Jones also temporarily served in Wigley's portfolios from December 1999 to February 2000 in an acting capacity while Wigley withdrew from his duties due to ill health.)	Ynys Môn	May 1999–August 2000
Shadow Assembly Secretary for Social Inclusion and Equal Opportunity	Helen Mary Jones AM	Llanelli	May 1999–August 2000
Plaid Cymru Policy Co-ordinator in the Welsh Assembly	Cynog Dafis AM	Mid and West Wales	May 1999–August 2000
Shadow Assembly Secretary for Economic Development	Phil Williams AM	South Wales East	May 1999–August 2000
Shadow Assembly Secretary for Education and Childcare	Gareth Jones AM	Conwy	May 1999–August 2000
Shadow Assembly Secretary for Education and Training	Elin Jones AM	Ceredigion	May 1999–August 2000
Shadow Assembly Secretary for Agriculture and Rural Development	Rhodri Glyn Thomas AM	Carmarthen East and Dinefwr	May 1999–August 2000
Shadow Assembly Secretary for the Environment, Local Government and Planning	Janet Ryder AM	North Wales	May 1999–August 2000
Shadow Assembly Secretary for Health and Social Services	Dai Lloyd AM	South Wales West	May 1999–August 2000

== See also ==
- Michael administration
- Interim Morgan administration
