= Frontbench Team of Ieuan Wyn Jones =

Plaid Cymru frontbench team in the National Assembly for Wales (2011–2012)

- Frontbench Team of the National Assembly for Wales
- May 2011–March 2012
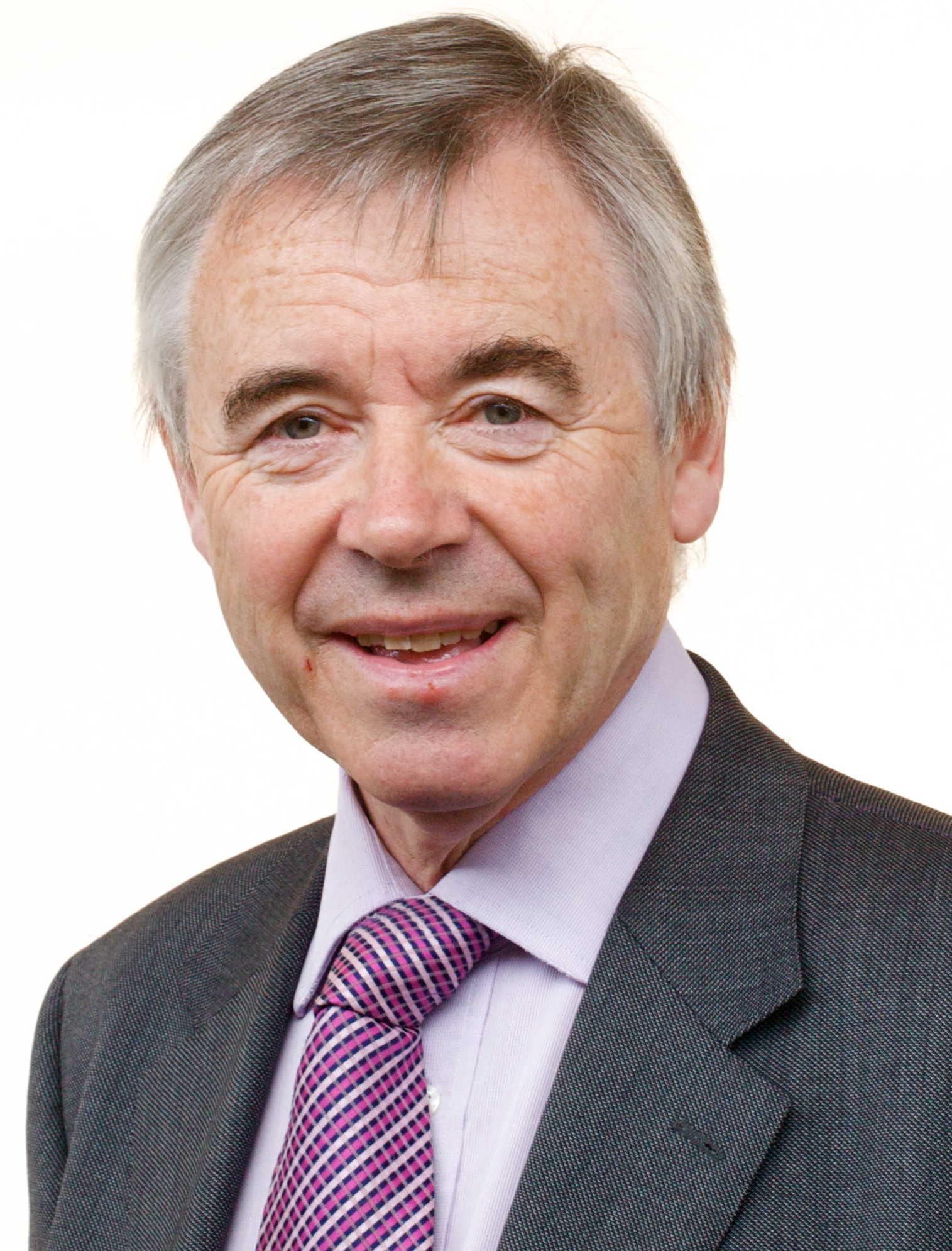
- Jones' official portrait, 2011
- Date formed: 25 May 2011
- Date dissolved: 15 March 2012

People and organisations
- Leader: Ieuan Wyn Jones
- Member party: Plaid Cymru
- Status in legislature: Opposition party

History
- Legislature term: 4th National Assembly for Wales
- Predecessor: Shadow Cabinet of Ieuan Wyn; Jones (2007) (Note: From July 2007 to May 2011, Plaid Cymru participated in a coalition government with Welsh Labour. Prior to this, it had been the official opposition in the National Assembly for Wales.)
- Successor: Frontbench Team of Leanne Wood

Ieuan Wyn Jones, the leader of Plaid Cymru, formed his frontbench team (Note: Although Plaid Cymru was not the Official Opposition and so did not form the Shadow Cabinet of Wales at the time, Ieuan Wyn Jones' frontbench team was officially known within the party as the "shadow cabinet".) of party spokespeople in the National Assembly for Wales on 25 May 2011 after the dissolution of his party's coalition government with Rhodri Morgan and Carwyn Jones' Welsh Labour following the 2011 National Assembly for Wales election. Jones had previously led a shadow cabinet before entering coalition from 2000 to 2007, when his party had served as the Official Opposition since the 1999 National Assembly for Wales election.

At the 2011 assembly election, Plaid Cymru's share of seats in the assembly fell from 15 to 11 seats to make it the third-largest party in the assembly. The Welsh Conservatives, which had served as the official opposition for the duration of the coalition government, won enough seats to supersede Plaid as the second-largest party with 14 seats and remained the official opposition after the end of the coalition. Jones announced that he would resign as Plaid leader in the first half of the assembly term and on 15 March 2012 Leanne Wood won a leadership election to succeed him as leader before forming a new frontbench team.

== Background ==
Ieuan Wyn Jones was elected president of Plaid Cymru in 2000 following the resignation of the previous president Dafydd Wigley on grounds of ill health. At the time, Plaid Cymru was the Official Opposition in the National Assembly for Wales, so Jones formed a shadow cabinet. After the 2007 National Assembly for Wales election, Jones engaged in coalition talks with the Welsh Liberal Democrats and the Welsh Conservatives to end Rhodri Morgan's Welsh Labour minority government. After these talks broke drown, Jones entered talks with Labour and in July Plaid Cymru formed a coalition government, with Jones becoming Morgan's deputy first minister. Plaid continued to serve in coalition with Labour after Morgan resigned and was succeeded by Carwyn Jones in 2009, with Ieuan Wyn Jones remaining as deputy first minister.

At the 2011 National Assembly for Wales election, Plaid Cymru share of seats fell from 15 to 11 seats and it lost its place as the second-largest party to the Welsh Conservatives, which won 14 seats and remained the Official Opposition, having gained that status after Plaid joined the government in 2007. After the election, Labour did not renew its coalition with Plaid Cymru and instead formed a minority government. As it was not the Official Opposition, Plaid Cymru did not form the new Welsh Shadow Cabinet, though it could appoint a frontbench team of party spokespeople like other minor opposition parties in the assembly.

== History ==
Jones formed his frontbench team of party spokespeople on 25 May 2011. Jones appointed himself as the spokesperson for finance and the constitution. Jocelyn Davies became the Plaid Cymru Group business manager and also its chief whip and the spokesperson for planning. The other appointments included Elin Jones as spokesperson for health, Simon Thomas as spokesperson for spokesperson for education, higher education and skills, Alun Ffred Jones as spokesperson for business, enterprise, technology and science, Leanne Wood as spokesperson for housing and regeneration, Rhodri Glyn Thomas as spokesperson for Europe, local government, communities and transport, Dafydd Elis-Thomas as spokesperson for environment and energy, Bethan Jenkins as spokesperson for heritage, Welsh language and sport, Lindsay Whittle as spokesperson for social services, children and equal opportunities, and Llyr Gruffydd as spokesperson for rural affairs (inc. agriculture, animal health and welfare).

On 13 May 2011, Jones announced that he would resign as the leader of Plaid Cymru sometime in the first half of the 4th assembly term which would end in 2016 following its disappointing performance at the 2011 assembly election. In October 2011, Jones announced that a leadership election would be held on 15 March 2012 to elect his successor. By December 2011, Dafydd Elis-Thomas, Elin Jones, Leanne Wood and Simon Thomas had all declared their intention to stand for the leadership. Thomas withdrew from the race in February 2012 and on 15 March 2012 Wood defeated Jones and Elis-Thomas and was elected the new leader of Plaid Cymru. She formed a new frontbench team on 21 March 2012.

== Members ==
Portfolio	Spokesperson	Constituency	Term
Leader of Plaid Cymru	Ieuan Wyn Jones AM	Ynys Môn	August 2000–March 2012
Spokesperson for Finance and the Constitution	Ieuan Wyn Jones AM	Ynys Môn	May 2011–March 2012
Plaid Cymru Group Business Manager; Plaid Cymru Group Chief Whip; Spokesperson for Planning	Jocelyn Davies AM	South Wales East	May 2011–March 2012
Spokesperson for Health	Elin Jones AM	Ceredigion	May 2011–March 2012
Spokesperson for Education, Higher Education and Skills	Simon Thomas AM	Mid and West Wales	May 2011–March 2012
Spokesperson for Business, Enterprise, Technology and Science	Alun Ffred Jones AM	Arfon	May 2011–March 2012
Spokesperson for Housing and Regeneration	Leanne Wood AM	North Wales	May 2011–March 2012
Spokesperson for Europe, Local Government, Communities and Transport	Rhodri Glyn Thomas AM	Carmarthen East and Dinefwr	May 2011–March 2012
Spokesperson for Environment and Energy	Dafydd Elis-Thomas AM	Dwyfor Meirionnydd	May 2011–March 2012
Spokesperson for Heritage, Welsh Language and Sport	Bethan Jenkins AM	South Wales West	May 2011–March 2012
Spokesperson for Social Services, Children and Equal Opportunities	Lindsay Whittle AM	South Wales East	May 2011–March 2012
Spokesperson for Rural Affairs (inc. Agriculture, Animal Health and Welfare)	Llyr Gruffydd AM	North Wales	May 2011–March 2012

== See also ==
- Frontbench Team of Kirsty Williams
- Second Jones government
