= Plaid Cymru leadership election =

Plaid Cymru leadership election may refer to:

- 1981 Plaid Cymru presidential election
- 1984 Plaid Cymru presidential election
- 1991 Plaid Cymru presidential election
- 2000 Plaid Cymru leadership election
- 2003 Plaid Cymru leadership election
- 2012 Plaid Cymru leadership election
- 2018 Plaid Cymru leadership election
