= Eirian Llwyd =

Welsh artist (1951–2014)

- Born: 1951; Denbigh, Wales
- Died: 29 January 2014 (aged 62–63); Bangor, Wales
- Known for: Printmaker
- Spouse: Ieuan Wyn Jones (m. 1974)

Eirian Llwyd (1951 – 29 January 2014) was a Welsh artist and wife of former Plaid Cymru leader Ieuan Wyn Jones.

== Biography ==
Llwyd was born at Prion near Denbigh, Wales. After nursing in Liverpool between 1969 and 1973 she worked as a midwife at St Asaph Hospital. In 1974 she married Ieuan and was supportive of his political career in Parliament, Assembly Member, Leader of Plaid Cymru and Deputy First Minister in the One Wales Government.

Llwyd was a proud nationalist and campaigned alongside Cymdeithas yr Iaith in protest for the Welsh language between the 1960s and 1970s. She also promoted women's positions in politics and helped reconfigure Plaid's constitution in the 1980s to secure women in Plaid's major committees. Along with her charity work, Llwyd established the Rhyl branch of Women's Aid in the 1970s and 1980s.

In 2001, Llwyd focused on art and graduated at Cardiff Institute specializing in the field of print. Thereafter she was regularly exhibited in Wales and abroad. Her success helped co-establish a gallery called The Original Print Place, to bring promote a number of other Welsh artists.

At the age of 63, Llwyd died at Ysbyty Gwynedd in Bangor after a short battle with cancer. In January 2015 it was announced a Memorial Fund would be set up in her name to provide grants for new Welsh artists that specialize in printmaking.
