= Bourne shadow cabinet =

Shadow cabinet of Wales (2007–2011)

Bourne Shadow Cabinet
- Shadow Cabinet of Wales
- 2007-2011
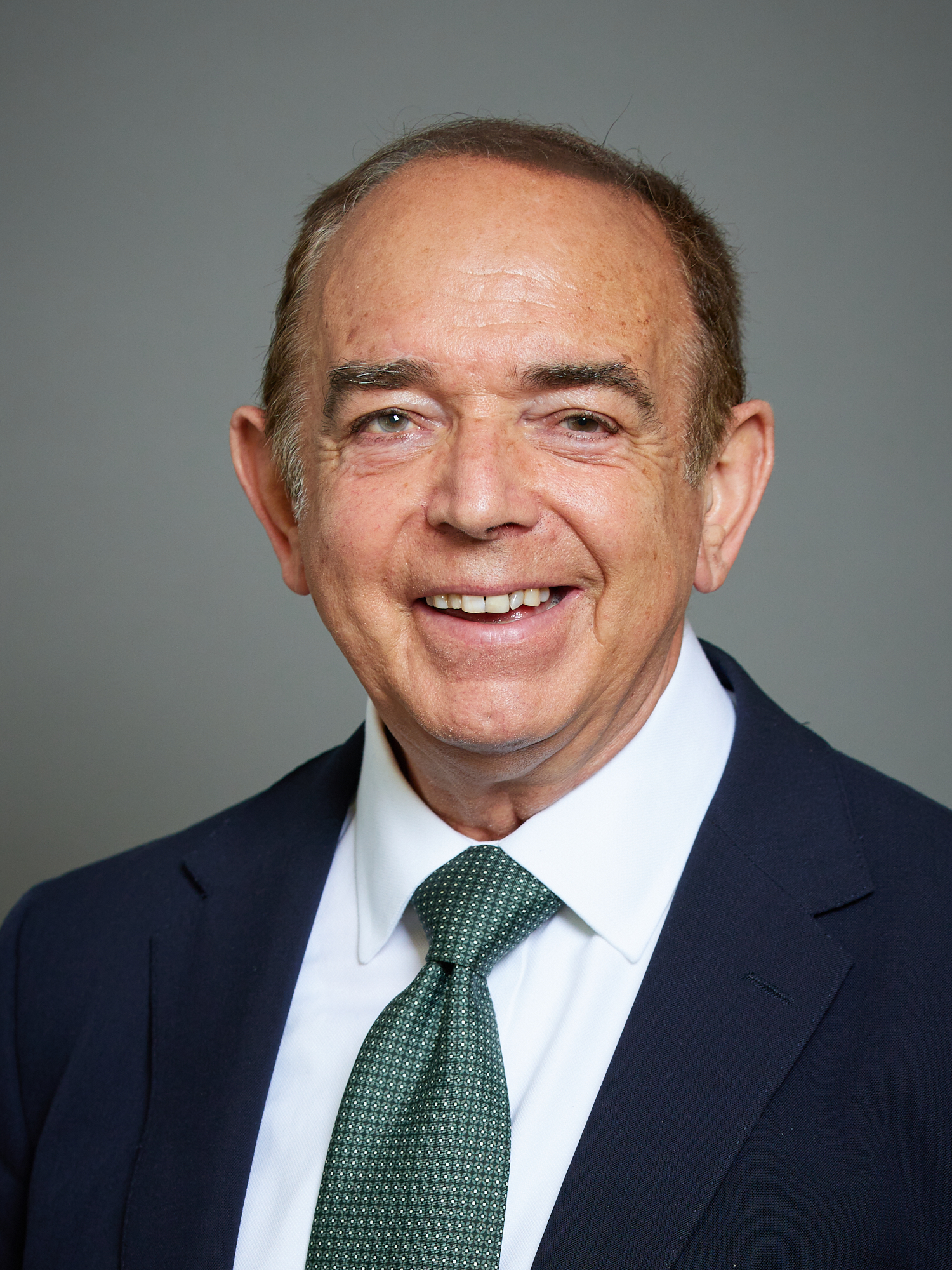
- Bourne's later official House of Lords portrait, c. 2022

People and organisations
- Monarch: Elizabeth II
- Leader of the Opposition and Shadow First Minister: Nick Bourne
- Member party: Welsh Conservative
- Status in legislature: Official Opposition

History
- Elections: 2007 assembly election 2011 assembly election
- Legislature term: 4th National Assembly for Wales
- Predecessor: Shadow Cabinet of Ieuan Wyn Jones
- Successor: Interim Shadow Cabinet of Paul Davies; First Shadow Cabinet of Andrew RT Davies

Nick Bourne became Leader of the Opposition in Wales after the Welsh Conservatives became the largest party that was not a part of the government in the National Assembly for Wales after the 2007 Assembly Elections. This was because the second largest overall party, Plaid Cymru, had entered into government as part of the One Wales coalition with Welsh Labour.

Bourne's Conservatives also participated in negotiations to enter a 'rainbow coalition' with Plaid Cymru and the Welsh Liberal Democrats. These negotiations fell through after the Welsh Liberal Democrats failed to approve the agreement, with an internal vote resulting in a tie.

Bourne's Shadow Cabinet lasted one term, as Bourne lost his seat on the Mid and West Wales list at the 2011 National Assembly for Wales election.

== History ==
=== Initial Shadow Cabinet ===
Bourne appointed a frontbench team of Welsh Conservative spokespeople on 5 July 2007, several weeks prior to the formation of the One Wales government on 27 July 2007. This frontbench team was carried over to become his Shadow Cabinet. This therefore meant that Angela Burns became Shadow Minister for Finance, Jonathan Morgan became Shadow Minister for Health, Alun Cairns became Shadow Minister for Education, David Melding became Shadow Minister for Economic Development, Andrew RT Davies became Shadow Minister for Transport, Nick Ramsay became Shadow Minister for Local Government, Darren Millar became Shadow Minister for Environment and Planning, Paul Davies became Shadow Minister for Culture, Sport and the Welsh Language, Brynle Williams became Shadow Minister for Rural Affairs, Mark Isherwood became Shadow Minister for Social Justice, Equality and Housing, and William Graham was appointed as Shadow Chief Whip, Business Manager, and Chair of the Welsh Conservative Group in the Assembly.

=== Reshuffles ===
In June 2008, the group was reshuffled to remove Alun Cairns from the Shadow Cabinet, after he described Italians as "greasy wops" on BBC Radio Cymru. Cairn's role as Shadow Minister for Education was assigned to Andrew RT Davies. Cairns was also removed from the role as Chair of the National Assembly's finance committee. Angela Burns was swapped from being Shadow Finance Minister to take this role. Nick Bourne took over the role of Shadow Minister for Finance directly, alongside his role as Leader of the Opposition. The role of David Melding was expanded to include RT Davies' prior transport brief, making him Shadow Minister for the Economy and Transport.

In February 2009, Bourne embarked upon a substantial reshuffle of his Shadow Cabinet. Notably, Jonathan Morgan and William Graham both rejected the roles that were offered to them. Morgan is understood to have turned down the role of Shadow Minister for Education, while it is not public which roles Graham rejected. Morgan was instead appointed as Chair of the Assembly's Audit Committee. Alun Cairns was appointed Chief Whip, Business Manager and Shadow Heritage Minister, whilst collaborating on the Shadow Economy Ministry with David Melding, Andrew RT Davies was made Shadow Health Minister and Paul Davies was made Shadow Minister for Education and the Welsh Language. Angela Burns was made Shadow Minister for Environment, Nick Ramsay was appointed Shadow Minister for Finance, Darren Millar was appointed Shadow Minister for Local Government, Brynle Williams retained the Rural Affairs brief, and Mark Isherwood retained the Social Justice brief.

In December 2009, Mohammad Asghar, formerly of Plaid Cymru, crossed the floor and joined the Welsh Conservatives. His daughter Natasha Asghar, later also a Senedd Member, also joined the Welsh Conservatives at the same time. Mohammad Asghar declared he had switched his affiliation because he believed Wales was better off within the union, and believed in retaining the royal family. He was made Shadow Equalities Minister shortly after.

In November 2010, the Shadow Cabinet was again reshuffled, with Jonathan Morgan and William Graham returning to the Shadow Cabinet as Shadow Local Government Minister and Shadow Regeneration Minister respectively. Darren Millar, who previously held the Local Government role, became Shadow Minister for Economy and Transport. David Melding stood back from the Shadow Cabinet, with a focus on devising the Welsh Conservatives' Manifesto for 2011. Mohammad Ashgar also took the role of Shadow Heritage minister, while retaining the Equalities portfolio.

A few days later, Jonathan Morgan was also appointed Chair of the Health Committee. Shortly after, Andrew RT Davies stood down as Shadow Minister for Health, and was replaced by Nick Ramsay.

=== Dissolution ===
Bourne's Shadow Cabinet lasted one term, as, at the 2011 assembly election, Bourne lost his seat on the Mid and West Wales list, due to successes for the Welsh Conservatives on constituency seats in the region. The Welsh Conservatives continued to be the largest party not in government, with Paul Davies taking over the leadership of the Welsh Conservatives in an interim capacity. Andrew RT Davies would later become the leader of the Welsh Conservatives after a leadership contest, and form his own Shadow Cabinet.

== Members ==
=== July 2007 - June 2008 ===
Portfolio	Shadow Minister	Constituency	Term
Leader of the Opposition; Leader of the Welsh Conservatives	Nick Bourne AM	Mid and West Wales	July 2007 - May 2011
Shadow Minister for Finance	Angela Burns AM	Carmarthen West and South Pembrokeshire	July 2007 - June 2008
Shadow Minister for Health	Jonathan Morgan AM	Cardiff North	July 2007 - February 2009
Shadow Minister for Education	Alun Cairns AM	South Wales West	July 2007 - June 2008
Chief Whip, Business Manager, Chair of the Welsh Conservative Assembly Group	William Graham AM	South Wales East	July 2007 - February 2009
Shadow Minister for Economic Development	David Melding AM	South Wales Central	July 2007 - June 2008
Shadow Minister for Transport	Andrew RT Davies AM	South Wales Central	July 2007 - June 2008
Shadow Minister for Local Government	Nick Ramsay AM	Monmouth	July 2007 - February 2009
Shadow Minister for Environment and Planning	Darren Millar AM	Clwyd West	July 2007 - February 2009
Shadow Minister for Culture, Sport and the Welsh Language	Paul Davies AM	Preseli Pembrokeshire	July 2007 - February 2009
Shadow Minister for Rural Affairs	Brynle Williams AM	North Wales	July 2007 - May 2011
Shadow Minister for Social Justice, Equality and Housing	Mark Isherwood AM	North Wales	July 2007 - February 2009

=== June 2008 - February 2009 ===
Portfolio	Shadow Minister	Constituency	Term
Leader of the Opposition; Leader of the Welsh Conservatives	Nick Bourne AM	Mid and West Wales	July 2007 - May 2011
Shadow Minister for Finance	Nick Bourne AM	Mid and West Wales	June 2008 - February 2009
Shadow Minister for Health	Jonathan Morgan AM	Cardiff North	July 2007 - February 2009
Chief Whip, Business Manager, Chair of the Welsh Conservative Assembly Group	William Graham AM	South Wales East	July 2007 - February 2009
Shadow Minister for Economy and Transport	David Melding AM	South Wales Central	June 2008 - February 2009
Shadow Minister for Education	Andrew RT Davies AM	South Wales Central	June 2008 - February 2009
Shadow Minister for Local Government	Nick Ramsay AM	Monmouth	July 2007 - February 2009
Shadow Minister for Environment and Planning	Darren Millar AM	Clwyd West	July 2007 - February 2009
Shadow Minister for Culture, Sport and the Welsh Language	Paul Davies AM	Preseli Pembrokeshire	July 2007 - February 2009
Shadow Minister for Rural Affairs	Brynle Williams AM	North Wales	July 2007 - May 2011
Shadow Minister for Social Justice, Equality and Housing	Mark Isherwood AM	North Wales	July 2007 - February 2009

=== February 2009 - November 2010 ===
Portfolio	Shadow Minister	Constituency	Term
Leader of the Opposition; Leader of the Welsh Conservatives	Nick Bourne AM	Mid and West Wales	July 2007 - May 2011
Chief Whip, Business Manager, Shadow Heritage Minister	Alun Cairns AM	South Wales West	February 2009 - November 2010
Shadow Minister for Economy	Alun Cairns AM	South Wales West	February 2009 - November 2010
Shadow Minister for Economy	David Melding AM	South Wales Central	February 2009 - November 2010
Shadow Minister for Finance	Nick Ramsay AM	Monmouth	February 2009 - November 2010
Shadow Minister for Health	Andrew RT Davies AM	South Wales Central	February 2009 - November 2010
Shadow Minister for Education and the Welsh Language	Paul Davies AM	Preseli Pembrokeshire	February 2009 - May 2011
Shadow Minister for Local Government	Darren Millar AM	Clwyd West	February 2009 - November 2010
Shadow Minister for Environment	Angela Burns AM	Carmarthen West and South Pembrokeshire	February 2009 - May 2011
Shadow Minister for Rural Affairs	Brynle Williams AM	North Wales	July 2007 - May 2011
Shadow Minister for Social Justice	Mark Isherwood AM	North Wales	February 2009 - May 2011
Shadow Minister for Equalities	Mohammad Asghar AM	South Wales East	December 2009 - November 2010

=== November 2010 - May 2011 ===
Portfolio	Shadow Minister	Constituency	Term
Leader of the Opposition; Leader of the Welsh Conservatives	Nick Bourne AM	Mid and West Wales	July 2007 - May 2011
Chief Whip and Business Manager	Alun Cairns AM	South Wales West	November 2010 - May 2011
Shadow Minister for Economy and Transport	Darren Millar AM	Clwyd West	November 2010 - May 2011
Shadow Minister for Health	Nick Ramsay AM	Monmouth	November 2010 - May 2011
Shadow Minister for Education and the Welsh Language	Paul Davies AM	Preseli Pembrokeshire	February 2009 - May 2011
Shadow Minister for Environment	Angela Burns AM	Carmarthen West and South Pembrokeshire	February 2009 - May 2011
Shadow Minister for Rural Affairs	Brynle Williams AM	North Wales	July 2007 - May 2011
Shadow Minister for Local Government	Jonathan Morgan AM	Cardiff North	November 2010 - May 2011
Shadow Minister for Regeneration	William Graham AM	South Wales East	November 2010 - May 2011
Shadow Minister for Social Justice	Mark Isherwood AM	North Wales	February 2009 - May 2011
Shadow Minister for Equalities and Heritage	Mohammad Asghar AM	South Wales East	November 2010 - May 2011
