= 2003 Plaid Cymru leadership election =

Plaid Cymru leadership election

- 8 May 2003 – 15 September 2003
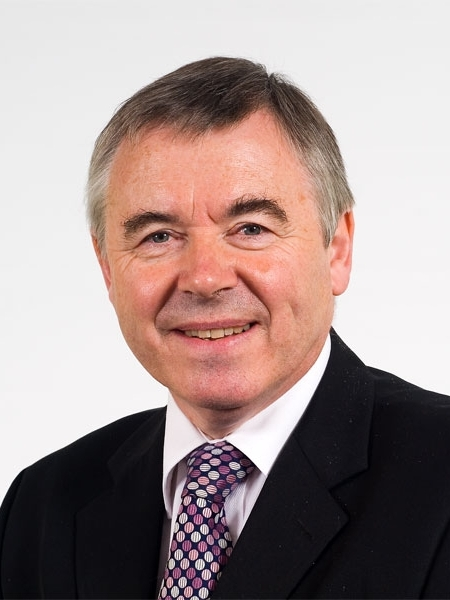

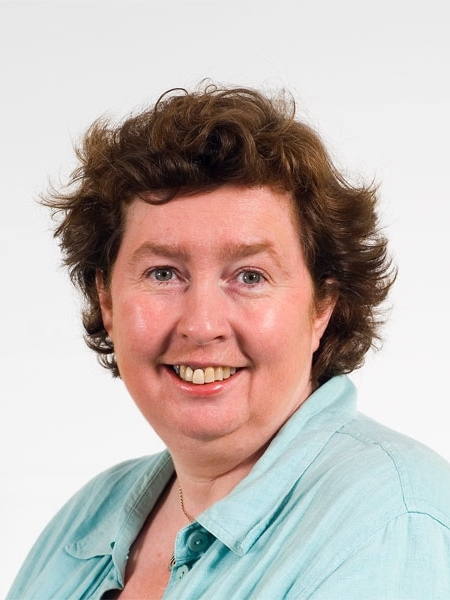

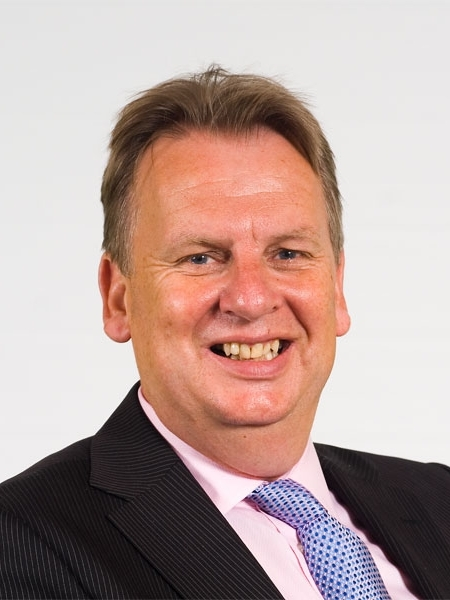
Candidate	Ieuan Wyn Jones	Helen Mary Jones	Rhodri Glyn Thomas
First round	2,078	2,089	1,014
Percentage	40.1%	40.3%	19.6%
Final round	2,603	2,532	—
Percentage	50.7%	49.3%	—
Leader before election
Ieuan Wyn Jones
Elected Leader
Ieuan Wyn Jones

The 2003 Plaid Cymru leadership election was held following the resignation of Ieuan Wyn Jones after a disappointing showing in the 2003 Assembly elections where the party fell from 17 to 12 seats.

Ieuan Wyn Jones had led the party since 2000. Ieuan Wyn Jones initially resigned but then decided to contest the leadership election, he was challenged by Helen Mary Jones whom he had defeated three years previously, as well as Rhodri Glyn Thomas.

Voting closed in 15 September, with the results announced at Cardiff's St David's Hall on 18 September.

The contest was narrowly won by Ieuan Wyn Jones in the final round with 2,603 votes, against Helen Mary Jones' 2,532.

== Candidates and Endorsements ==
=== Ieuan Wyn Jones ===
Supporters included:

- Dafydd Elis Thomas, former Plaid Cymru President and AM for Meirionnydd Nant Conwy
- Elfyn Llwyd, MP for Meirionnydd Nant Conwy

=== Helen Mary Jones ===
Supporters included:

- Dafydd Wigley, former Plaid Cymru President
- Hywel Williams, MP for Caernarfon
- Dafydd Iwan
- Cllr Lindsay Whittle, Caerphilly Council Leader

=== Rhodri Glyn Thomas ===
Supporters included:

== Results ==
Candidate	First round		Second round		
Candidate	Votes	%	Transfers	Votes	%
Ieuan Wyn Jones	2,078	40.1	▲525	2,603	50.7
Helen Mary Jones	2,089	40.3	▲443	2,532	49.3
Rhodri Glyn Thomas	1,014	19.6			
Total	5,181	100	968	5,135	100

Turnout was around 61% of Plaid's estimated 8,500 members.
