= 1984 Plaid Cymru presidential election =

Plaid Cymru leadership election

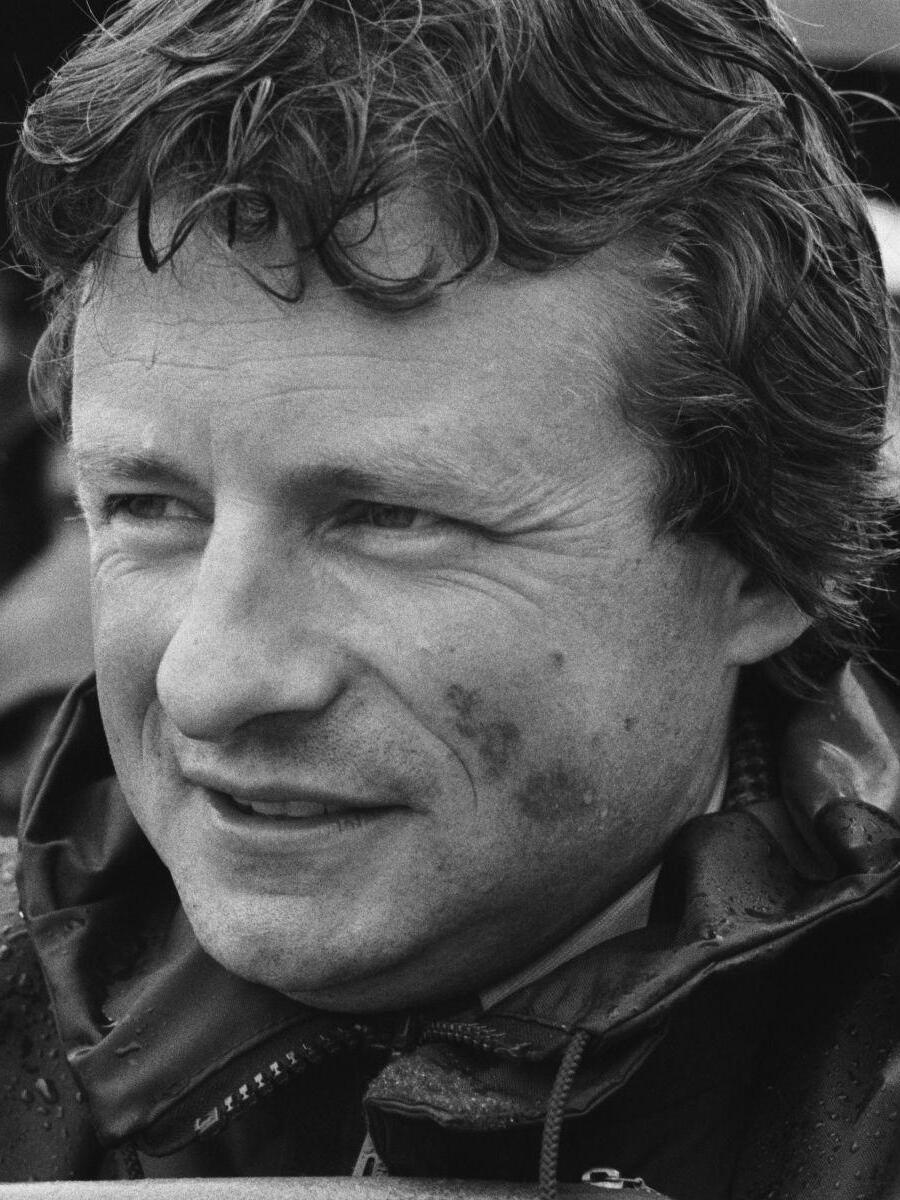

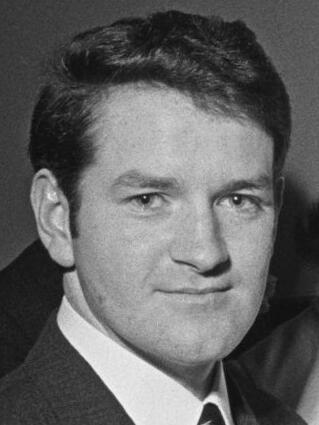
Candidate	Dafydd Elis Thomas	Dafydd Iwan
First round	1,570	1,382
Percentage	53.18	46.81
President before election
Dafydd Wigley
Elected President
Dafydd Elis Thomas

The 1984 Plaid Cymru presidential election (Note: The Party leader was referred to as the president until March 2000 when the separate role of Leader was created) was held following the resignation of Dafydd Wigley, who had led the party since 1981, on the grounds of his caring commitments linked to his children's health conditions.

The contest was between Meirionnydd Nant Conwy MP Dafydd Elis Thomas and Gwynedd-based politician Dafydd Iwan.

The contest was won by Dafydd Elis Thomas with the result being announced at Plaid Cymru's conference in Lampeter on Saturday 27 October 1984, Thomas went on to serve until he stood down in October 1991.
