= Alun Ffred Jones =

Welsh politician (born 1949)

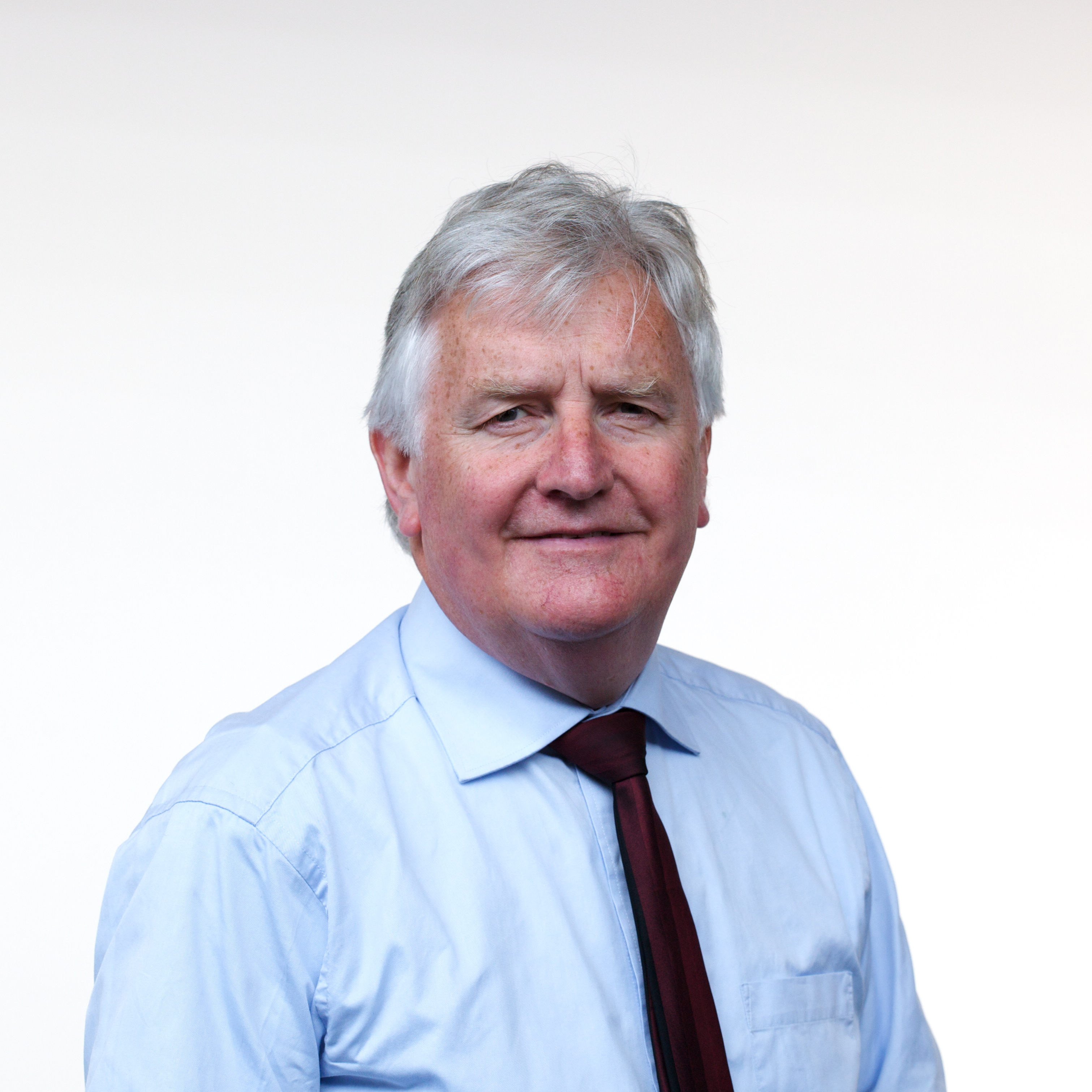

Chairman of Plaid Cymru
- In office 19 October 2019 – 18 July 2022
- Leader: Adam Price
- Preceded by: Dafydd Trystan Davies

Minister for Heritage
- In office 28 July 2008 – 13 May 2011
- First Minister: Rhodri Morgan; Carwyn Jones
- Preceded by: Rhodri Glyn Thomas
- Succeeded by: Huw Lewis (post reorganised)

Deputy Leader of Plaid Cymru
- In office 2007–2008
- Leader: Ieuan Wyn Jones
- Preceded by: Rhodri Glyn Thomas
- Succeeded by: Helen Mary Jones

Assembly Member for Arfon Caernarfon (2003–2007)
- In office 1 May 2003 – 4 April 2016
- Preceded by: Dafydd Wigley
- Succeeded by: Siân Gwenllian

Personal details
- Born: 29 October 1949 (age 76) Brynamman, Carmarthenshire, Wales
- Party: Plaid Cymru
- Education: Bangor University

Alun Ffred Jones (born 29 October 1949) is a Welsh politician and member of Plaid Cymru and former television producer, writer and director. Jones was the National Assembly for Wales Member for Caernarfon 2003–07 and for the newly created Arfon constituency from 2007 until he stood down in 2016. He served as Minister for Heritage between 2008 and 2011 as part of the One Wales Government. In 2008 he made history by being the first UK representative to speak in the Welsh language at a meeting of the European Union. He was Chairman of Plaid Cymru from October 2019 until he resigned in July 2022.

== Background ==
Jones was born in Brynamman and is the brother of former Plaid Cymru President and folk singer Dafydd Iwan. He is also the brother of the actor, the late Huw Ceredig. He was educated at the University of Wales, Bangor. Before his election, he was a television director and producer for Ffilmiau'r Nant and a BAFTA Cymru winner as co-writer of the S4C Welsh language comedy series, C’mon Midffild!. Before that he was a Welsh teacher and Head of Department and then a journalist with HTV. Jones speaks Welsh, English and French.

== Political career ==
Jones is the former Leader of Gwynedd County Council and is the chair of Nantlle Vale Football Club. His main political interests are in broadcasting, community development and the economy. On 22 July 2008 he was appointed Minister for Heritage in the Welsh Labour/Plaid Cymru coalition Welsh Assembly Government, and in this role he was active in obtaining approval for the Welsh Language (Wales) Measure 2011.

On 20 November 2008, Jones became the first person to use the Welsh language as a representative of the UK government at a European Union meeting in Brussels.

Jones resigned as Plaid chairman in July 2022 over the party's handling of Jonathan Edwards' readmission to the party after a two-year suspension.

== Offices held ==
Senedd
Preceded by Dafydd Wigley	Assembly Member for Caernarfon; 2003–2007	Constituency abolished
New constituency	Assembly Member for Arfon; 2007–2016	Succeeded by Siân Gwenllian
Political offices
Preceded by Elin Jones	Shadow Economic Development Minister; 2006–2007	Succeeded by David Melding
Preceded by Rhodri Glyn Thomas	Minister for Heritage; 22 July 2008 – 2011	job restructured
