= 1991 Plaid Cymru presidential election =

Plaid Cymru leadership election

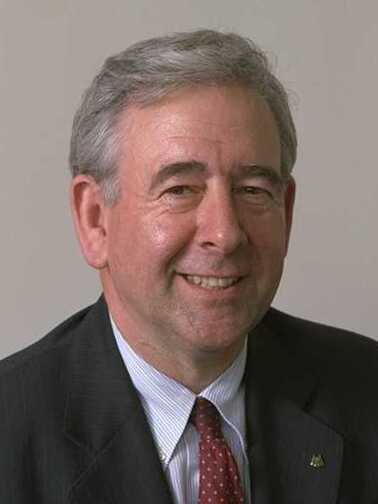
Candidate	Dafydd Wigley
Popular vote	Unopposed
President before election
Dafydd Elis Thomas
Elected President
Dafydd Wigley

The 1991 Plaid Cymru presidential election (Note: The Party leader was referred to as the president until March 2000 when the separate role of Leader was created) was held following the resignation of Dafydd Elis Thomas, who had led the party since 1984 after his announcement that he would stand down as an MP at the 1992 general election.

On 18 September 1991 it was reported that Dafydd Wigley was to stand for the post of President of Plaid Cymru, nominations closed a week later on 24 September with Dafydd Wigley being the only candidate.

Wigley formally took over as leader at Plaid Cymru's conference which was held over the weekend of 26/27 October 1991.

Wigley would go onto lead Plaid until his resignation in 2000 by which point the party had increased its number of MPs from three to four, gained their first two MEPs and won 17 out of the 60 available seats in the inaugural election to The National Assembly for Wales.
