= 1981 Plaid Cymru presidential election =

Plaid Cymru leadership election

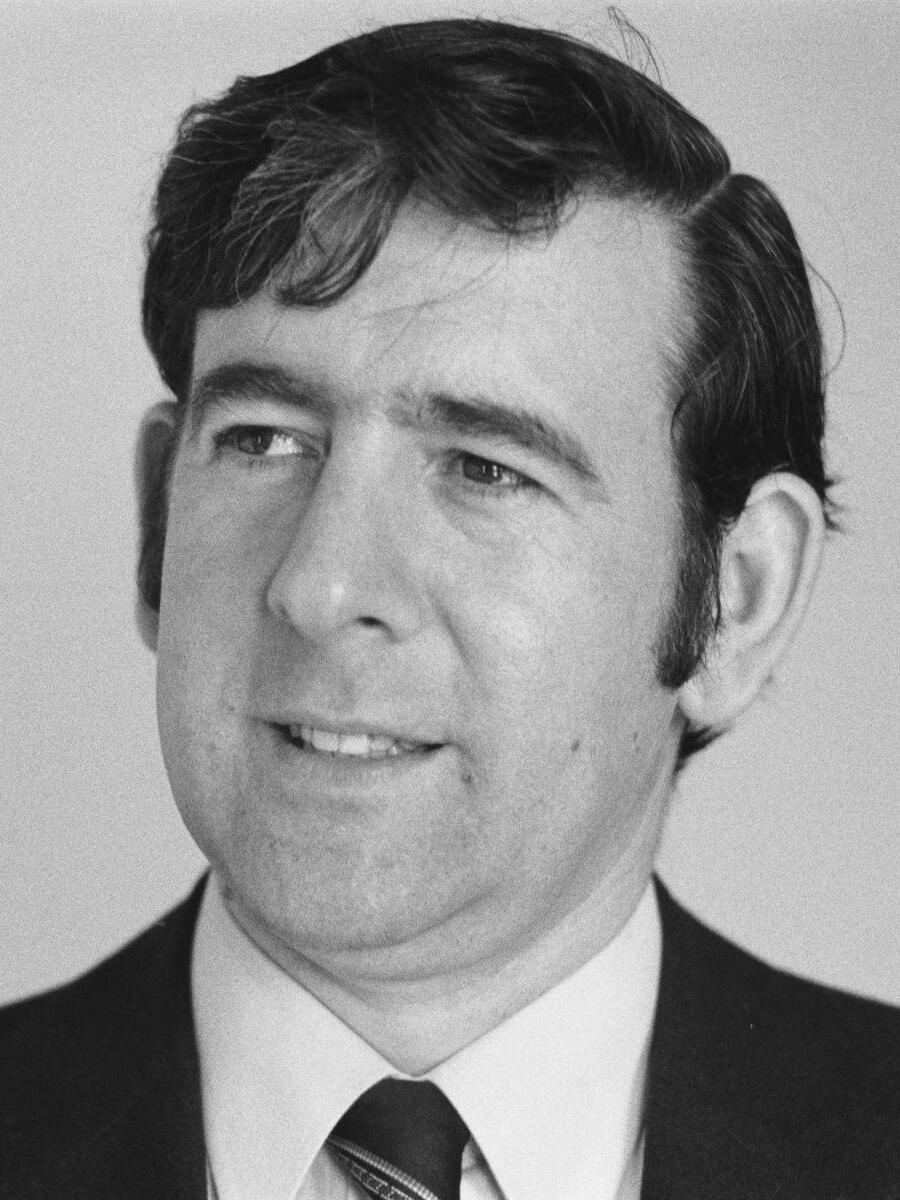

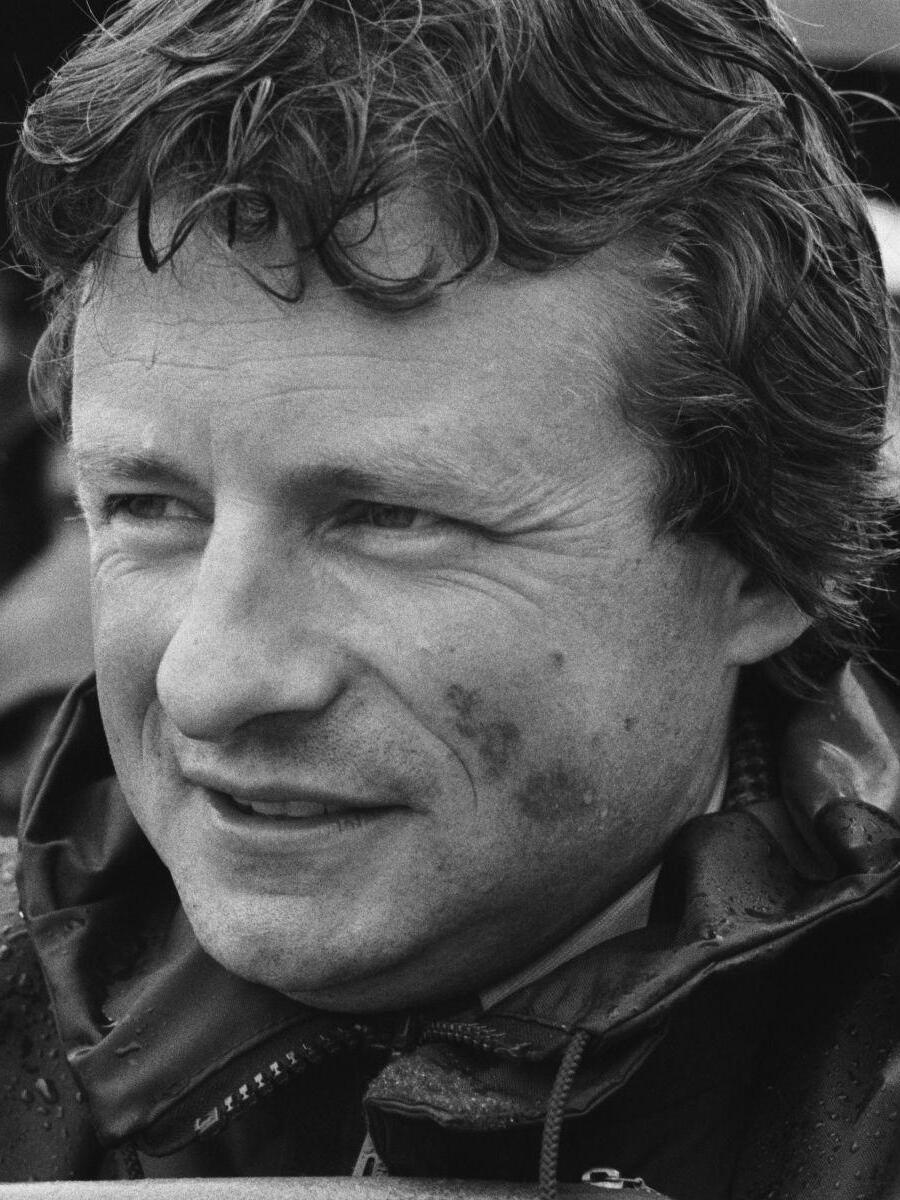
Candidate	Dafydd Wigley	Dafydd Elis Thomas
First round	273	212
Percentage	56.28%	43.71%
President before election
Gwynfor Evans
Elected President
Dafydd Wigley

The 1981 Plaid Cymru presidential election (Note: The Party leader was referred to as the president until March 2000 when the separate role of Leader was created) was held following the resignation of Gwynfor Evans, who had led the party since 1945. The election followed both the defeat at the 1979 general election of Evans in Carmarthen and the defeat earlier that year of the Yes side in 1979 devolution referendum.

The contest was between Caernarfon MP Dafydd Wigley and Meirionnydd Nant Conwy MP Dafydd Elis Thomas, both of whom had entered the House of Commons in February 1974.

The contest was won by Dafydd Wigley, who went on to serve until 1984.
