= Elin Jones =

Welsh politician (born 1966)

The Right Honourable Elin Jones MS
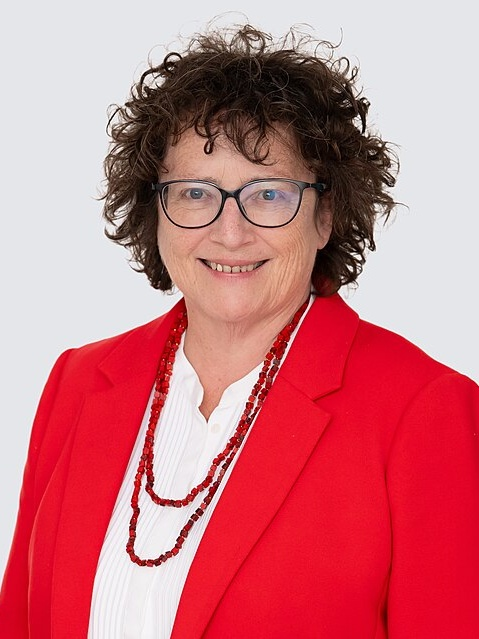
- Official portrait, 2026

Cabinet Minister for Finance
- Incumbent
- Assumed office 13 May 2026
- First Minister: Rhun ap Iorwerth
- Preceded by: Mark Drakeford

Llywydd of the Senedd
- In office 11 May 2016 – 12 May 2026
- Monarchs: Elizabeth II; Charles III
- First Minister: Carwyn Jones; Mark Drakeford; Vaughan Gething; Eluned Morgan
- Deputy: Ann Jones; David Rees
- Preceded by: Rosemary Butler
- Succeeded by: Huw Irranca-Davies

Deputy Leader of Plaid Cymru
- In office 17 July 2012 – 11 May 2016
- Leader: Leanne Wood
- Preceded by: Helen Mary Jones
- Succeeded by: Siân Gwenllian; Rhun ap Iorwerth

Minister for Rural Affairs
- In office 19 July 2007 – 11 May 2011
- First Minister: Rhodri Morgan; Carwyn Jones
- Preceded by: Carwyn Jones
- Succeeded by: Lesley Griffiths

Member of the Senedd
- Incumbent
- Assumed office 6 May 1999
- Preceded by: Position established
- Constituency: Ceredigion (1999–2026); Ceredigion Penfro (2026–present)

Personal details
- Born: 1 September 1966 (age 60) Lampeter, Wales
- Party: Plaid Cymru
- Education: Cardiff University (BSc); Aberystwyth University (MSc)

Elin Jones (born 1 September 1966) is a Welsh politician who has served as the Cabinet Minister for Finance since 2026. A member of Plaid Cymru, Jones was the Llywydd of the Senedd from 2016 to 2026 and has been a Member of the Senedd (MS) since its establishment in 1999, representing Ceredigion until 2026, and Ceredigion Penfro since May 2026. Along with Lynne Neagle, Jones is the joint longest serving member of the Senedd, serving since 1999.

== Background ==
Jones attended Llanwnnen Primary School and Lampeter Comprehensive. Her uncle, J.B. Evans, was one of the founders and the first General Secretary of the Farmers’ Union of Wales. She graduated from University of Wales, Cardiff with a BSc in Economics and took a post-graduate MSc in Agricultural Economics at the University of Wales, Aberystwyth in 1989. Previously she was employed as an Economic Development officer for the Development Board for Rural Wales. She is a former Shadow Environment, Planning and Countryside Minister.

Jones speaks Welsh and English. She is also a former director of Radio Ceredigion and of Wes Glei Cyf, a television production company.

== Political career ==
Elin Jones served on Aberystwyth Town Council from 1992 to 1999 and was the youngest-ever Mayor of Aberystwyth from 1997 to 1998. She was the National Chair of Plaid Cymru between 2000 and 2002.

=== National Assembly for Wales ===
In the first Assembly elections in 1999 Elin Jones was elected as Assembly Member for Ceredigion and served as Shadow Economic Development Minister during the Assembly's first term. Following the Assembly election in 2003, she retained this portfolio until 2006 when she became Shadow Minister for Environment, Planning & Countryside. On 9 July 2007 the One Wales government was formed and Elin Jones was made Minister for Rural Affairs. Elin Jones continued in this position until Plaid Cymru left Government at the 2011 elections. Her record was criticized by George Monbiot in his 2013 book Feral.

In the fourth Assembly she became Plaid's health spokesperson and unsuccessfully contested the leadership election following the resignation of Ieuan Wyn Jones.

=== Llywydd ===
In the fifth Assembly she beat fellow Plaid Cymru AM Dafydd Elis-Thomas to become Presiding Officer of the National Assembly for Wales by 34 votes to his 25. She is also Llywydd of the Welsh Youth Parliament

In June 2021, Jones attempted to ban Members of the Senedd from displaying flags in their offices during video calls.

In the 2026 Senedd election, following reforms of the Senedd electoral system, Jones was elected as candidate in the newly established Ceredigion Penfro constituency.

Following the election, she stepped down as Llywydd and was appointed Cabinet Minister for Finance in the new ap Iorwerth government.

== Offices held ==
Senedd
Preceded by (new post)	Member of the Senedd for Ceredigion; 1999–2026	Succeeded by Seat abolished
Preceded by (new seat)	Member of the Senedd for Ceredigion Penfro; 2026–present	Incumbent
Preceded by Rosemary Butler	Llywydd of the Senedd; 2016–present	Incumbent
Political offices
Preceded by (new post)	Shadow Economic Development Minister; 1999–2006	Succeeded by Alun Ffred Jones
Preceded by TBC	Shadow Minister for Environment, Planning & Countryside; 2006–2007	Succeeded by (post reorganised)
Preceded by (post re-organised)	Minister for Rural Affairs; 2007–2011	Succeeded by (post reorganised)
Party political offices
Preceded by Marc Phillips	Chair of Plaid Cymru; 2000–2002	Succeeded by John Dixon
