= Janet Ryder =

British politician (born 1955)

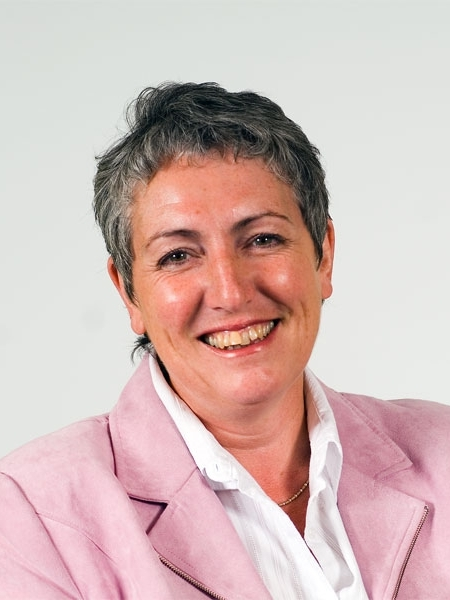
- Official portrait, 2007

Member of the Welsh Assembly for North Wales
- In office 6 May 1999 – 6 May 2011
- Preceded by: New Assembly

Personal details
- Born: 21 June 1955 (age 70) Sunderland, England
- Party: Plaid Cymru

Janet Ryder (born 21 June 1955) is a Welsh politician. She was a Plaid Cymru member of the National Assembly for Wales for North Wales from 1999 to 2011. She moved with her family to Wales in 1990 and has since learnt Welsh.

== Professional career ==
Ryder was born in Sunderland. A former teacher and youth worker, she was involved with voluntary and community work in her home town of Ruthin.

In 2010 she became a member of the executive board of the Wales Rugby League and has been one of its patrons since 2006.

She was formerly the Chair of Canolfan Awelon Management Committee and was also a former director on the board of Denbighshire Voluntary Services Council.

== Political career ==
Ryder has served as Mayor of Ruthin, on the Denbighshire County Council from 1995 to 1999, and on the Plaid Cymru National Executive, where she was formerly Shadow Minister for Education and Lifelong Learning.

During the First Assembly (1999–2003), she was the Shadow Minister for Local Government and Communities and in 2002 she was given additional responsibility for Finance. She was re-elected in May 2003 to serve in the Second Assembly (2003–2007) and was one of twelve members of the Plaid Cymru – The Party of Wales group. Following a Shadow Cabinet reshuffle in November 2003 she became the Shadow Minister for Education and Lifelong Learning. In April 2006, in line with changes made by the Assembly Government this portfolio changed to Education, Lifelong Learning and Skills. Her portfolio included responsibilities for schools, further education and skills development, higher education, the youth service and the careers service.

During the Third Assembly (2007–2011) she resigned that post (June 2008) and became chair of the Subordinate Legislation Committee which subsequently was renamed the Constitutional Affairs Committee. Since 2007 she has also been chair of the Wales branch of the Commonwealth Parliamentary Association. At the same time she became chair of the Cross Party Group on Autism.

In March 2008, Ryder launched a campaign calling on the UK Government to allow national flags such as the Welsh dragon to be displayed on car number plates. "I'm launching a petition to put pressure on Gordon Brown to listen to the people on this matter," she said. "Thousands have already voted with their feet on this and are proudly flying the flag but many more would no doubt join them if they knew they would not be breaking the law."

She contested Clwyd South in the 2010 general election, finishing fourth.

She did not stand to be re-elected in the 2011 National Assembly for Wales election.

Senedd
Preceded by (new post)	Assembly Member for North Wales; 1999 – 2011	Succeeded by Llyr Gruffydd
