= Ceredigion (Senedd constituency) =

Constituency in Wales, 1999–2026

Coordinates: 52.381°N 3.922°W

- Former Senedd county constituency for the Senedd

- Ceredigion shown within the Mid and West Wales electoral region and the region shown within Wales

Former Senedd county constituency
- Created: 1999
- Abolished: 2026
- Party: Plaid Cymru
- MS: Elin Jones
- Preserved county: Dyfed

Ceredigion was a constituency of the Senedd. It elected one Member of the Senedd by the first past the post method of election. It was also one of eight constituencies in the Mid and West Wales electoral region, which elected four additional members, in addition to eight constituency members, to produce a degree of proportional representation for the region as a whole.

It was represented by Plaid Cymru's Elin Jones from its creation in 1999 to its abolition in 2026, who had also been the Llywydd (Presiding Officer) of the Senedd from 2016 to 2026.

== Boundaries ==
Map of 2007–2026 boundaries

The area of the constituency was similar to that of the county of Ceredigion.

=== 1999 to 2007 ===
The constituency was created for the first election to the Assembly, in 1999, with the name and boundaries of the Ceredigion Westminster constituency. It was a Dyfed constituency, one of five constituencies that covered, and entirely within, the preserved county of Dyfed.

The other four Dyfed constituencies were Carmarthen East and Dinefwr, Carmarthen West and South Pembrokeshire, Llanelli and Preseli Pembrokeshire. They are all within the Mid and West Wales electoral region.

The region consisted of the eight constituencies of Brecon and Radnorshire, Carmarthen East and Dinefwr, Carmarthen West and South Pembrokeshire, Ceredigion, Llanelli, Meirionnydd Nant Conwy, Montgomeryshire and Preseli Pembrokeshire.

=== From 2007 ===
Boundaries changed for the 2007 Assembly election. Ceredigion remained one of five Dyfed constituencies and one of eight constituencies in the Mid and West Wales region. However, boundaries within Dyfed changed, to realign them with local government ward boundaries and to reduce disparities in the sizes of constituency electorates, and the boundaries of the region changed, to align them with the boundaries of preserved counties.

The other four Dyfed constituencies were, again, Carmarthen West and South Pembrokeshire, Carmarthen East and Dinefwr, Llanelli and Preseli Pembrokeshire. They were all within the Mid and West Wales electoral region.

The region consisted of the constituencies of Brecon and Radnorshire, Carmarthen East and Dinefwr, Carmarthen West and South Pembrokeshire, Ceredigion, Dwyfor Meirionnydd, Llanelli, Montgomeryshire and Preseli Pembrokeshire.

For Westminster purposes, the same new constituency boundaries became effective for the 2010 United Kingdom general election.

== Voting ==
In general elections for the Senedd, each voter had two votes. The first vote was used to vote for a candidate to become the Member of the Senedd for the voter's constituency, elected by the first past the post system. The second vote was used to vote for a regional closed party list of candidates. Additional member seats were allocated from the lists by the d'Hondt method, with constituency results being taken into account in the allocation.

== Members of the Senedd ==
Election	Member	Party	Portrait
1999	Elin Jones	Plaid Cymru	

== Elections ==
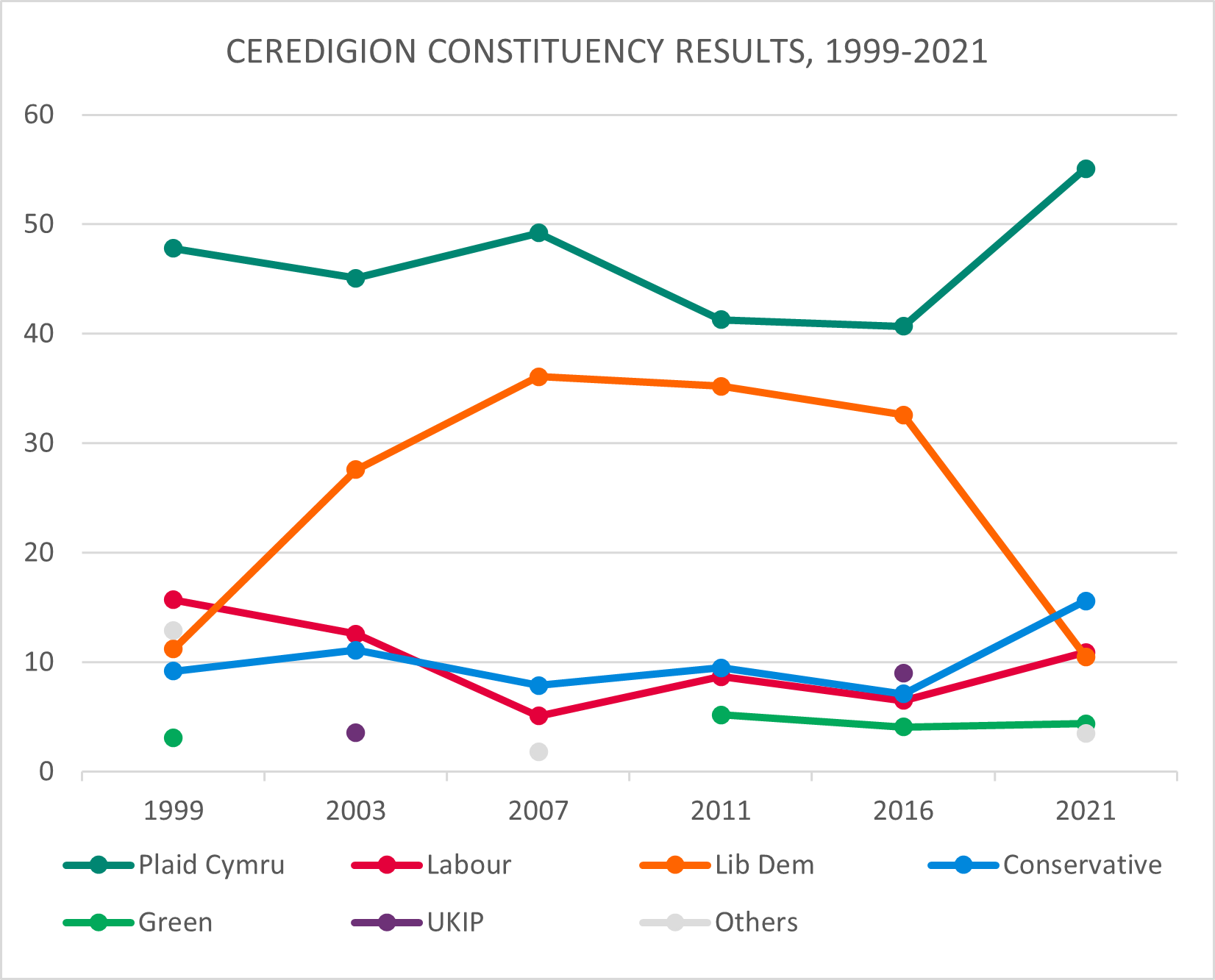
Election results since 1999 (parties who never got >5% counted as others)

=== Elections in the 2020s ===
2021 Senedd election: Ceredigion
Party	Candidate	Constituency			Regional		
Party	Candidate	Votes	%	±%	Votes	%	±%
Plaid Cymru	Elin Jones (Note: Incumbent member for this constituency)	16,946	55.1	+14.4	14,201	45.9	+8.7
Conservative	Amanda Jenner	4,801	15.6	+8.5	5,137	16.6	+6.7
Labour	Dylan Lewis-Rowlands	3,345	10.9	+4.4	4,888	15.8	+5.6
Liberal Democrats	Cadan ap Tomos	3,227	10.5	-22.1	2,650	8.6	-11.8
Green	Harry Hayfield	1,356	4.4	+0.3	1,795	5.8	-0.4
Reform	Gethin James	775	2.5	New	392	1.3	New
Freedom Alliance (UK)	Stephanie Evans	305	1.0	New	208	0.7	New
Abolish					684	2.2	-1.8
UKIP					390	1.3	-9.0
Christian					176		
Gwlad					131	0.4	New
Propel					120	0.4	New
Communist					95	0.3	+0.1
TUSC					41	0.1	New
Majority		12,145	39.5	+31.4			
Turnout		30,755	55.74	−0.4			
Plaid Cymru hold		Swing					

=== Elections in the 2010s ===
Welsh Assembly Election 2016: Ceredigion
Party	Candidate	Constituency			Regional		
Party	Candidate	Votes	%	±%	Votes	%	±%
Plaid Cymru	Elin Jones (Note: Incumbent member for this constituency)	12,014	40.7	-0.6	10,692	37.2	+0.7
Liberal Democrats	Elizabeth Evans	9,606	32.6	-2.6	5,858	20.4	-6.4
UKIP	Gethin James	2,665	9.0	New	2,973	10.3	+6.6
Conservative	Felix Aubel	2,075	7.1	-2.4	2,834	9.9	-2.9
Labour	Iwan Wyn Jones	1,902	6.5	-2.2	2,916	10.2	-0.3
Green	Brian Williams	1,223	4.1	-1.1	1,793	6.2	-0.1
Abolish					1,146	4.0	New
Monster Raving Loony					169	0.6	New
Welsh Christian					108	0.4	-0.3
Association of Welsh Independents					91	0.3	New
People First (Wales)					89	0.3	New
Communist					58	0.2	-0.2
Majority		2,408	8.1	+2.0			
Turnout		29,485	56.1	+4.2			
Plaid Cymru hold		Swing					

Welsh Assembly Election 2011: Ceredigion
Party	Candidate	Constituency			Regional		
Party	Candidate	Votes	%	±%	Votes	%	±%
Plaid Cymru	Elin Jones	12,020	41.3	-7.9	10,596	36.5	-5.1
Liberal Democrats	Elizabeth Evans	10,243	35.2	0.9	7,789	26.8	+0.9
Conservative	Luke Evetts	2,755	9.5	+1.6	3,718	12.8	+0.3
Labour	Richard Boudier	2,544	8.7	+3.6	3,049	10.5	+2.7
Green	Chris Simpson	1,514	5.2	New	1,821	6.3	+1.7
UKIP					1,066	3.7	+1.5
Socialist Labour					376	1.3	+0.6
BNP					309	1.1	-0.7
Welsh Christian					206	0.7	-0.3
Communist					121	0.4	+0.1
Majority		1,777	6.1	−7.0			
Turnout		29,076	51.9	−3.8			
Plaid Cymru hold		Swing					

Regional ballots rejected: 187

=== Elections in the 2000s ===
Welsh Assembly Election 2007: Ceredigion
Party	Candidate	Constituency			Regional		
Party	Candidate	Votes	%	±%	Votes	%	±%
Plaid Cymru	Elin Jones	14,818	49.2	+4.1	12,488	41.6	+2.2
Liberal Democrats	John Davies	10,863	36.1	+8.5	7,769	25.9	+5.2
Conservative	Trefor Jones	2,369	7.9	-3.2	3,753	12.5	-1.2
Labour	Linda Grace	1,530	5.1	-7.5	2,348	7.8	-6.7
Independent	(Dafydd) Emyr Morgan	528	1.8	New			
Green					1,394	4.6	-0.8
UKIP					663	2.2	-1.2
BNP					550	1.8	New
Welsh Christian					286	1.0	New
Socialist Labour					210	0.7	New
Gwynoro Jones - Independent					202	0.7	New
Caroline Evans - Independent					128	0.4	New
Communist					93	0.3	New
Veritas					79	0.3	New
CPA					58	0.2	New
Majority		3,955	13.1	−4.4			
Turnout		30,108	55.7	+5.7			
Plaid Cymru hold		Swing	-2.3				
Notes

Welsh Assembly Election 2003: Ceredigion
Party	Candidate	Constituency			Regional		
Party	Candidate	Votes	%	±%	Votes	%	±%
Plaid Cymru	Elin Jones (Note: Incumbent member for this constituency)	11,883	45.1	-2.7	10,358	39.4	-14.2
Liberal Democrats	John Davies	7,265	27.6	+16.4	5,437	20.7	+5.1
Labour	Rhianon Passmore	3,308	12.6	-3.1	3,802	14.5	-1.1
Conservative	Owen J Williams	2,923	11.1	+1.9	3,589	13.7	+1.5
UKIP	Ian Sheldon	940	3.6	New	888	3.4	New
Green					1,417	5.4	+1.0
Mid and West Wales Pensioners					404	1.5	New
Cymru Annibynnol					208	0.8	New
Vote 2 Stop the War					101	0.4	New
Prolife Alliance					70	0.3	New
Majority		4,618	17.5	−14.6			
Turnout		26,470	50.0	−7.8			
Plaid Cymru hold		Swing	-9.4				
Notes

2003 Electorate: 52,940
Regional ballots rejected: 189

=== Elections in the 1990s ===
Welsh Assembly Election 1999: Ceredigion
Party	Candidate	Constituency			Regional		
Party	Candidate	Votes	%	±%	Votes	%	±%
Plaid Cymru	Elin Jones	15,258	47.8	N/A	17,131	53.6	N/A
Labour	Maria Battle	5,009	15.7	N/A	4,978	15.6	N/A
Independent	David Lloyd Evans	4,114	12.9	N/A			
Liberal Democrats	Doiran D. Evans	3,571	11.2	N/A	3,836	12.0	N/A
Conservative	Henri Lloyd Davies	2,944	9.2	N/A	3,881	12.2	N/A
Green	Dave Bradney	1,002	3.1	N/A	1,406	4.4	N/A
Socialist Labour					358	1.1	N/A
Other list parties					344	1.1	
Majority		10,249	32.1	N/A			
Turnout		31,898	57.8	N/A			
Plaid Cymru win (new seat)							
