= Ieuan Wyn Jones =

Welsh politician

- Official portrait, 2007

Deputy First Minister of Wales
- In office 11 July 2007 – 13 May 2011
- First Minister: Rhodri Morgan; Carwyn Jones
- Preceded by: Michael German
- Succeeded by: Huw Irranca-Davies

Leader of the Opposition in Wales
- In office 16 March 2000 – 11 July 2007
- First Minister: Rhodri Morgan
- Preceded by: Dafydd Wigley
- Succeeded by: Nick Bourne

Leader of Plaid Cymru
- In office 4 August 2000 – 16 March 2012
- Deputy: Rhodri Glyn Thomas (2003–2007); Alun Ffred Jones (2007–2008); Helen Mary Jones (2008–2012)
- Preceded by: Dafydd Wigley
- Succeeded by: Leanne Wood

Minister for the Economy and Transport
- In office 19 July 2007 – 11 May 2011
- First Minister: Rhodri Morgan; Carwyn Jones
- Preceded by: Brian Gibbons
- Succeeded by: Edwina Hart
Shadow cabinet positions
Shadow Trefnydd
In office 18 May 1999 – 4 August 2000
Leader	Dafydd Wigley
Preceded by	Shadow cabinet established
Succeeded by	Jocelyn Davies
Shadow Chief Whip
In office 18 May 1999 – 4 August 2000
Leader	Dafydd Wigley
Preceded by	Shadow cabinet established
Succeeded by	Elin Jones

Member of the National Assembly for Wales for Ynys Môn
- In office 6 May 1999 – 20 June 2013
- Preceded by: Constituency established
- Succeeded by: Rhun ap Iorwerth

Member of Parliament for Ynys Môn
- In office 11 June 1987 – 14 May 2001
- Preceded by: Keith Best
- Succeeded by: Albert Owen

Personal details
- Born: Ieuan Wyn Jones; 22 May 1949 (age 77) Denbigh, Denbighshire, Wales, UK
- Party: Plaid Cymru
- Spouse: Eirian Llwyd (m. 1974; died 2014)
- Children: 3
- Education: Liverpool Polytechnic
- Profession: Solicitor
- Website: Official website

Ieuan Wyn Jones (born 22 May 1949) is a Welsh former politician who served as Deputy First Minister of Wales from 2007 to 2011 and as Leader of the Opposition in Wales from 2000 to 2007. He was Leader of Plaid Cymru from 2000 to 2012. Jones was Member of Parliament (MP) for Ynys Môn from 1987 to 2001 and Assembly Member (AM) for Ynys Môn from 1999 to 2013.

Born in Denbigh, Jones studied law at Liverpool Polytechnic and began his career as a solicitor. He stood as a Plaid Cymru candidate in the October 1974 and 1979 general elections before being elected as the MP for Ynys Môn in 1987. In the 1999 National Assembly election, Jones was elected as the AM for Ynys Mon and served in the Wigley shadow cabinet as Shadow Trefnydd and Shadow Chief Whip from 1999 to 2000.

Jones became Leader of the Opposition and Leader of Plaid Cymru in 2000 following the resignation of Dafydd Wigley, and was re-elected as an AM in the 2003 election. After the 2007 election, Jones signed the One Wales coalition agreement with Welsh Labour, and was appointed into the fourth Rhodri Morgan government as Deputy First Minister of Wales and Minister for the Economy and Transport. He left government after Plaid became the third largest party at the 2011 election, and resigned as Plaid leader and AM in 2013.

== Early life and career ==
Ieuan Wyn Jones was born in Denbigh, Wales, and is a Welsh speaker. He has lived in both north and south Wales. Jones's early education was at Pontardawe Grammar School and at Ysgol y Berwyn in Bala, Gwynedd. Jones's brother Rhisiart said "The time we spent living in Garnswllt (between Ammanford, in Carmarthenshire, and Pontarddulais, in Swansea) was a very happy time for us as a family," adding "Many people think that Ieuan is just a 'gog' but parts of south Wales are very close to his heart."

In England Jones studied law at Liverpool Polytechnic where he secured an external London University law degree. He qualified as a solicitor in 1973 with second class honours in his solicitors' finals. Rhisiart Jones said his brother loves to travel and that after college Ieuan "organised a 'rite of passage' trip across Europe in his Hillman Imp." Before entering public service in 1987, Jones was a practising solicitor.

== Political career ==
Jones's main political interest is health and education policy. Jones has held a number of positions both in Plaid Cymru and as a UK Member of Parliament and Welsh Assembly Member. He was Plaid Cymru party chairman between 1980–1982 and 1990–1992.

=== Member of Parliament (1987–2001) ===
Jones campaigned for public office for the first time in Denbigh at the October 1974 general election, and stood again in 1979. At the 1987 general election, he won the Ynys Môn (Anglesey) seat. He continued to represent Ynys Môn until the 2001 general election, when he stood down to concentrate on the Welsh Assembly. While a Member of Parliament, he piloted a private member's bill to assist the hard of hearing in 1989 and was a member of the Welsh Affairs and Agriculture Select Committees. He was the joint chairman of the All-Party Older Persons Group and was appointed as a trustee of the Industry and Parliament Trust, a body promoting better understanding between parliamentarians and industrialists. He won an award as Politician of the Year from the Federation of Small Businesses.

Jones has been a governor of the Westminster Foundation for Democracy, a body that assists in the development of democratic institutions in many parts of the world.

Jones stood down at the 2001 election to spend more time in the Assembly.

=== First National Assembly (1999–2003) ===
Official portrait of Jones as an assembly member, 1999

Jones was the Plaid Cymru campaign director during the first elections to the Welsh Assembly in 1999. The elections were seen as a breakthrough by the party, which gained seats in solid Labour areas such as in the Rhondda, Islwyn and Llanelli and achieved by far their highest share of the vote in any Wales-wide election, winning 17 of 60 seats in the Assembly. Plaid Cymru saw themselves as the natural beneficiary of devolution.

In 1999, Jones became the Assembly's first Agriculture and Rural Affairs Committee chairman, a post he retained until February 2000.

=== Leader of Plaid Cymru (2000–2012) ===
He was elected President (Leader) of Plaid Cymru on 4 August 2000 with 77% of the vote over Helen Mary Jones and Jill Evans.

Jones reshuffled the party leadership with Jocelyn Davies as Business Manager; Elin Jones as Chief Whip and Agriculture & Rural Development spokeswoman; Phil Williams as Economic Development spokesman; and Helen Mary Jones as Environment, Transport and Planning and Equal Opportunities spokeswoman. Jones described his cabinet as "strong... capable of taking on Labour in the Assembly as well as making a vital contribution in promoting a positive policy agenda."

==== Language controversy ====
Controversy erupted in mid-winter 2001 when Gwynedd councillor Seimon Glyn voiced concern over "English immigrants" moving into traditionally Welsh-speaking communities. Though some Plaid Cymru colleagues said he had been taken out of context, Jones issued "strict instructions to Plaid Cymru party members that if they chose to speak on the same emotive issue in future, they should take care that their words were not misconstrued." Plaid Cymru refocused the argument back to one of locals being priced out of the housing market: nearly a third of all properties in Gwynedd are bought by people from out of that county. Jones's centrist policies may have been helped further by the formation of Welsh language pressure group Cymuned and the Independent Wales Party.

==== Llandudno party conference ====
At the Plaid Cymru party conference of 2002 in Llandudno, Jones called for greater Assembly authority "[on-parity] with Scotland's parliament", and "opposed any military conflict in Iraq, saying it would destabilise the Middle East." Jones also criticized health and public services policies and would end the "endless revamping of structures and administration".

"[Plaid Cymru] has been doing its homework", wrote BBC Wales political reporter Simon Morris, and is "determined to produce a credible programme of public service reform".

=== Second National Assembly (2003–2007) ===
However, in the Assembly election of May 2003, Plaid Cymru lost five seats, and within a week there were accusations of a plot headed by Assembly Member Helen Mary Jones and four other Plaid Cymru Assembly Members manoeuvring for Jones's removal. But Helen Mary Jones denied involvement. However, Jones resigned as both party president and leader of the assembly group. He admits this was a particularly difficult period.

But within three months he stood again for the position of assembly leader, having received support from both grassroots "all over Wales" and senior party members. The party was undergoing a reorganization and dividing its Cardiff Bay and Westminster responsibilities. This party constitutional change prompted new party elections. Jones was re-elected as Assembly group leader (he had been the party's Business Manager in the Assembly since May). In addition, when leader of the opposition he was also a member of the Assembly's European and External Affairs Committee and North Wales Regional Committee. Of early 2003 Jones said "it has been a remarkable journey for me personally and something that I have great pride in, in a sense, that I have been able to lead the party through a very difficult period.

In 2006, he was awarded an Honorary Fellowship by the University of Wales, Bangor. That summer Jones hiked through Wales on a "Wales Wide" tour from Ynys Môn to Swansea, where he attended the National Eisteddfod. Jones said his conversations with the people he met along the way helped create a manifesto better geared to the real needs of people.

In February 2006, Plaid Cymru undertook changes to its party structure, including designating the leader of the party in the Assembly as its overall leader, with Jones taking the post once more. Additionally, the party unveiled a radical change of image, opting to use "Plaid" as the party's name, although "Plaid Cymru – The Party of Wales" would remain the official title. The party's colours were changed to yellow from the traditional green and red, while the party logo was changed from the triban (three peaks) used since 1933 to a yellow Welsh poppy (Meconopsis cambrica).

=== Third National Assembly (2007–2011) ===
Jones led Plaid Cymru through the Welsh Assembly election of 3 May 2007. Plaid Cymru increased its share of the vote to 22% and its number of seats from 12 to 15, regaining Llanelli, gaining one additional list seat and winning the newly created constituency of Aberconwy The 2007 election also saw Plaid Cymru's Mohammad Asghar become the first ethnic minority candidate elected to the Welsh Assembly, though on 9 December 2009 he left and joined the Conservatives.

==== Government formation ====
Jones's initial attempts to form a three-party coalition with the Conservative and Liberal Democrat parties failed when the Liberal Democrat leadership backed out of coalition talks. This "Rainbow Coalition" would have formed the first ever PC-led government. With the reappointment of Welsh Labour's Rhodri Morgan as First Minister, the Liberal Democrat general party membership demanded that their leadership restart negotiations with Plaid and the Conservatives. However, by now Jones had entered into coalition talks with Labour in an attempt to form a stable government with Plaid's AMs approving a deal with the Labour Party on 27 June 2007. Labour's special party conference on 6 July 2007 approved the coalition; Plaid Cymru's conference the next day sealed the arrangement.

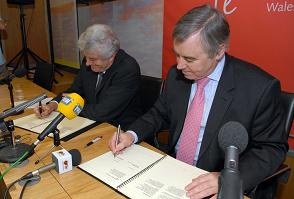
Jones and First Minister of Wales Rhodri Morgan signing the One Wales coalition agreement on 8 July 2007

During the coalition negotiations, Jones pressed for full law-making powers for the Assembly, similar to the Scottish Parliament. A referendum on the issue was promised "as soon as practicable, at or before the end of the assembly term (in 2011)", with Welsh Labour committed to campaign for a "yes" vote. Other points Jones fought for included a first-time buyer's credit, a reconfiguration of the Welsh National Health Care service, and a 3% annual reduction in carbon emissions by 2011 in areas of devolved competence. The result of the negotiations was the One Wales agreement.

Of Plaid Cymru's entering into government for the first time, Jones said, "The party's role so far has been one of the opposition party which put pressure on the other parties to move things forward for the benefit of Wales," and "From today we will be sharing the responsibility of directly operating on behalf of the people of Wales. I am looking forward to the challenge."

==== Deputy First Minister of Wales (2007–2011) ====
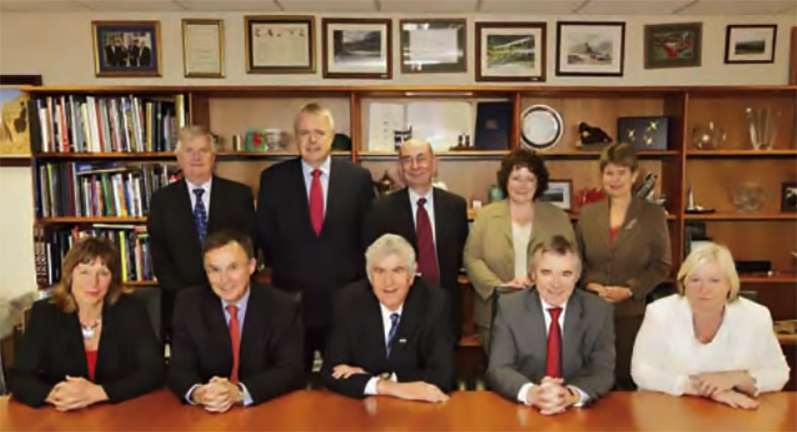
Jones (foreground, second from right) among the Fourth Rhodri Morgan government in May 2009

Ieuan Wyn Jones became Deputy First Minister of Wales on 11 July 2007. First Minister and Labour leader Rhodri Morgan was hospitalized days after the parties entered into coalition. Lord Elis-Thomas said of the situation, "I think [Jones] will be a very stable influence around the cabinet table in the difficult situation both parties are in now with the first minister's illness." The next day, Ieuan Wyn Jones, with the Queen, represented Wales in Belgium at the 90th anniversary ceremony of the Third Battle of Ypres at Passchendaele (World War I). During the battle, celebrated Welsh poet Hedd Wyn died along with thousands of other Welshmen.

Jones also represented Wales at the British-Irish Council held in Stormont on 16 July, where he said holding the council in the Stormont Parliament for the first time was "a historic occasion", and "The restoration of devolution was achieved as a result of the coming together, in a spirit of service to all the people of Northern Ireland, of two very distinct political traditions."

On 19 July 2007 it was announced that Jones would also be Minister for the Economy and Transport.

=== Fourth National Assembly (2011–2013) ===
Official portrait of Jones as an assembly member, 2011

Jones led Plaid into the Welsh Assembly election of 5 May 2011. Plaid Cymru lost 4 seats and, with 11 seats, became the third largest party in the Assembly; behind Labour (30 seats) and the Conservatives (14). Jones announced on 13 May 2011, the day he ceased being Deputy First Minister, that he would resign as leader of Plaid Cymru within the first half of the Assembly term. Jones remained as an Assembly Member until his resignation on 20 June 2013, in order to take a post leading the new Menai Science Park.

=== 2017 general election ===
In the 2017 United Kingdom general election, Jones contested the seat of Ynys Môn when he was unsuccessful.

== Personal life ==
Jones was married to Eirian Llwyd until her death in 2014. They had three children together. Jones's hobbies include studying local history, walking, and sports. Jones, a minister's son, is an elder in his local chapel and occasionally preaches. Jones became a Member of the Eisteddfod's Gorsedd in 2001. He is also a member of the International Film And Television Research Center, and the International Film And Television Club Of Asian Academy of Film & Television.

Ieuan Wyn Jones is known as a keen negotiator and a "man of integrity, one who is reliable and 'a good listener'". According to Lord Elis-Thomas, Jones assiduously "talks to each (Plaid Cymru assembly) group member individually" and "will ensure the [One Wales] government achieves what it says it will."

Jones is generally seen as a pragmatist, steering a middle course between his party's (predominantly southern) socialists and the language-inspired activists of the party's Anglesey and Gwynedd heartland. He was awarded a Doctor of Law (LLD) in 2023 by Bangor University for his contribution to Welsh Culture, Language, Music, and the Arts.

== Bibliography ==
Jones has published three books, Europe: the Challenge for Wales (1996); Y Llinyn Arian (1998), a biography of the Welsh nineteenth century publisher, Thomas Gee, and Jones's own autobiography O'r Cyrion i'r Canol (2021).

Parliament of the United Kingdom
Preceded by Keith Best	Member of Parliament for Ynys Môn; 1987–2001	Succeeded by Albert Owen
Senedd
New assembly	Member of the Senedd for Ynys Môn; 1999–2013	Succeeded by Rhun ap Iorwerth
Party political offices
Preceded by Eurfyl ap Gwilym	Chair of Plaid Cymru; 1980–1982	Succeeded by Dafydd Iwan
Preceded by Syd Morgan	Chair of Plaid Cymru; 1990–1992	Succeeded by John Dixon
Preceded by Dafydd Wigley	President of Plaid Cymru; 2000–2003	Succeeded by Dafydd Iwan
Preceded by Dafydd Wigley	Leader of Plaid Cymru in the Senedd; 2000–2012	Succeeded by Leanne Wood
Preceded by Dafydd Wigley	Leader of the Opposition; 2000–2007	Succeeded by Nick Bourne
Vacant Title last held by Michael German	Deputy First Minister for Wales; 2007–2011	Vacant Title next held by Huw Irranca-Davies
Preceded by Brian Gibbons	Minister for Economy and Transport; 2007–2011	Succeeded by Edwina Hart (Minister for Business, Enterprise & Technology)
