= Rhodri Glyn Thomas =

Welsh politician

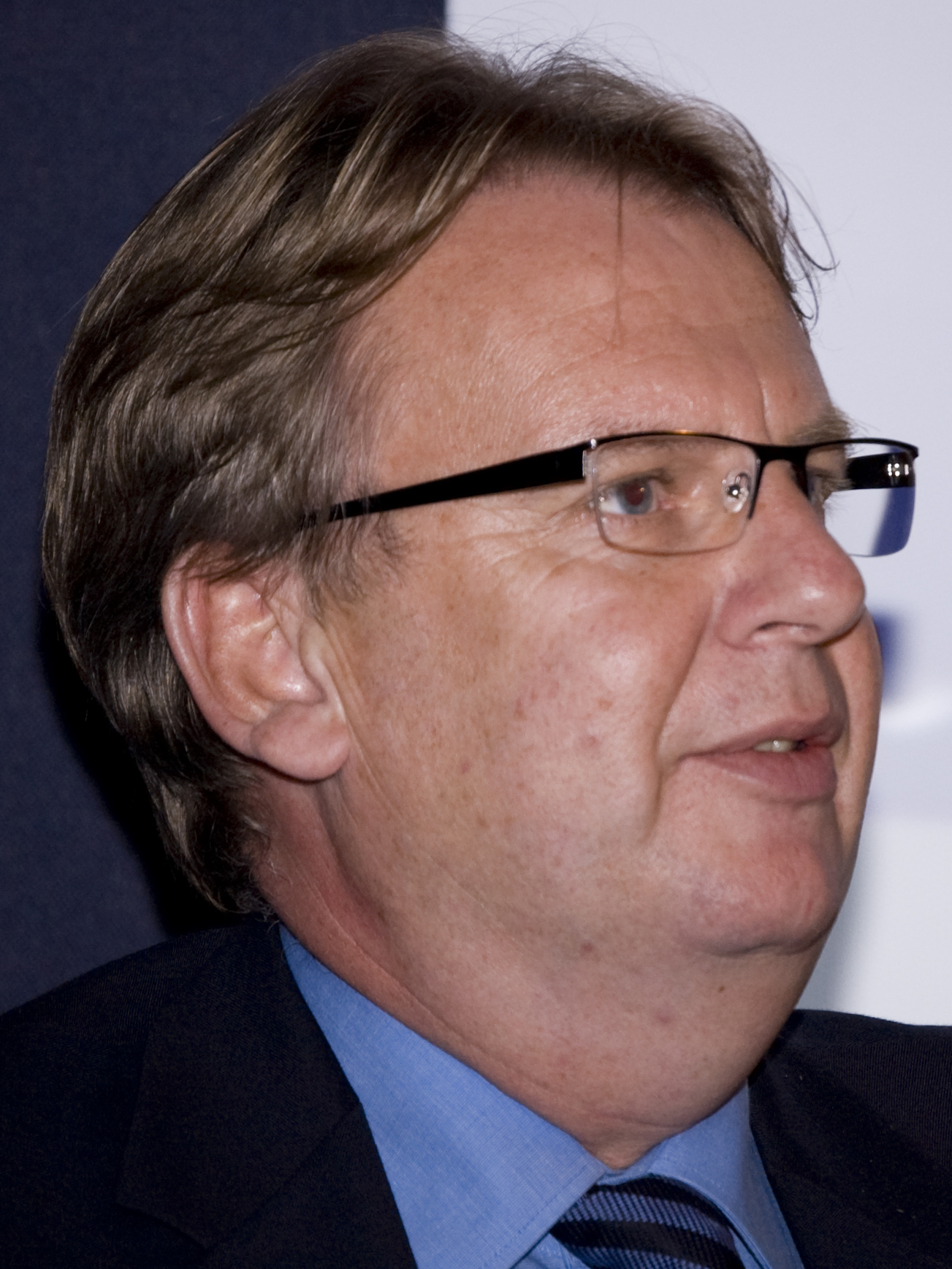
- Rhodri Glyn Thomas at the S4C25 conference in 2007.

Minister for Heritage
- In office 11 July 2007 – 18 July 2008
- First Minister: Rhodri Morgan
- Preceded by: New office
- Succeeded by: Alun Ffred Jones

Deputy Leader of Plaid Cymru
- In office 2003–2007
- Leader: Ieuan Wyn Jones
- Preceded by: New office
- Succeeded by: Alun Ffred Jones

Member of the Welsh Assembly for Carmarthen East and Dinefwr
- In office 6 May 1999 – 4 April 2016
- Preceded by: New Assembly
- Succeeded by: Adam Price
- Majority: 8,469 (28.9%)

Personal details
- Born: 11 April 1953 (age 73) Wrexham, Wales
- Party: Plaid Cymru
- Education: University of Wales, Lampeter, Bangor University, Aberystwyth University

Rhodri Glyn Thomas (born 11 April 1953) is a Welsh politician. He was the Plaid Cymru National Assembly for Wales Member for Carmarthen East and Dinefwr from 1999 to 2016, when he did not re-stand for election. Following his retirement from the Assembly he was appointed President of the National Library of Wales.

== Education ==
Thomas was born in Wrexham, Denbighshire. He attended Ysgol Bodhyfryd, Wrexham, and then Ysgol Morgan Llwyd, Wrexham, before leaving for the University of Wales, Aberystwyth in 1975 to study for a BA degree in Welsh and Education in 1975. After graduating, he studied for a BD degree in Theology at the University of Wales, Bangor and Bala-Bangor Theological Seminary under R. Tudur Jones. In 1991 he studied for a MTh degree at the University of Wales, Lampeter, reading American Theology although the final thesis he submitted was on the Union of Welsh Independents (Undeb yr Annibynwyr Cymraeg) role in the struggle to revive the Welsh Language in the 20th century.

== Professional career ==
Thomas is a Minister of Religion, the director of a language consultancy, a former Chair of CND Cymru and Welsh spokesperson for the Forum of Private Business.

== Political career ==
In 1992, Thomas fought the old Carmarthen constituency in the General Election for Plaid Cymru - Party of Wales. In the 1997 General Election he stood for Plaid Cymru in Carmarthen East & Dinefwr. In 1999 he fought the same constituency in the National Assembly Elections, winning by 6,980 votes. He was reelected in 2007 with an increased majority of over 8,000 making it the Assembly's second safest seat. Plaid Cymru entered into a coalition government with Welsh Labour in July 2007, and Rhodri Glyn Thomas was appointed as Minister for Heritage (19 July 2007). He resigned from this role in July 2008 after walking into a Cardiff pub with a lit cigar, thus breaking the law.

In November 2008, having travelled to the Gaza Strip alongside other European politicians, Thomas called for the international community to talk to the Palestinian group Hamas. "I can see no chance of peace in the Middle East until a dialogue is opened with Hamas," he said. "Since the election, Israel has imprisoned around 30 Hamas MPs. Whatever you think about their stance, the fact is they were democratically elected in an election which had a very high turnout and whose results were validated by international observers. The Israeli position is that Hamas are terrorists, but it isn’t that long ago that Nelson Mandela was described as a terrorist by Margaret Thatcher."

In December 2016 Thomas announced that he would stand as a candidate for election to Carmarthenshire County Council, contesting the St Clears ward. However, he was heavily defeated at the election by the sitting Independent councillor.

== Wales Book of the Year error ==
At the Academi 2008 Wales Book of the Year ceremony, Thomas incorrectly announced that Tom Bullough was the winner. The prize was, in fact, awarded to Dannie Abse, Thomas having read the card wrongly.

== Offices held ==
Senedd
Preceded by (new post)	Assembly Member for Carmarthen East and Dinefwr; 1999–2016	Succeeded by Adam Price
Political offices
Preceded by (new post)	Minister for Heritage; 2007-2008 11 July 2007 to 18 July 2008	Succeeded by Alun Ffred Jones
