= 2000 Plaid Cymru leadership election =

Plaid Cymru leadership election

- 31 May 2000 – 3 August 2000
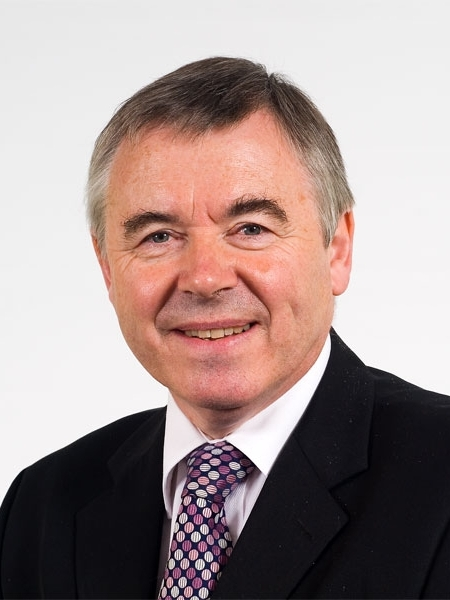

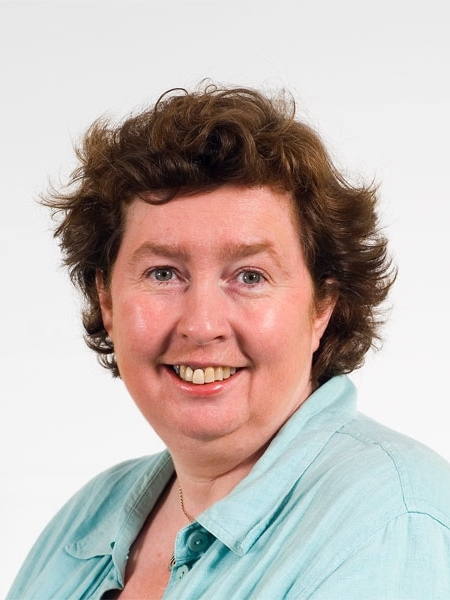

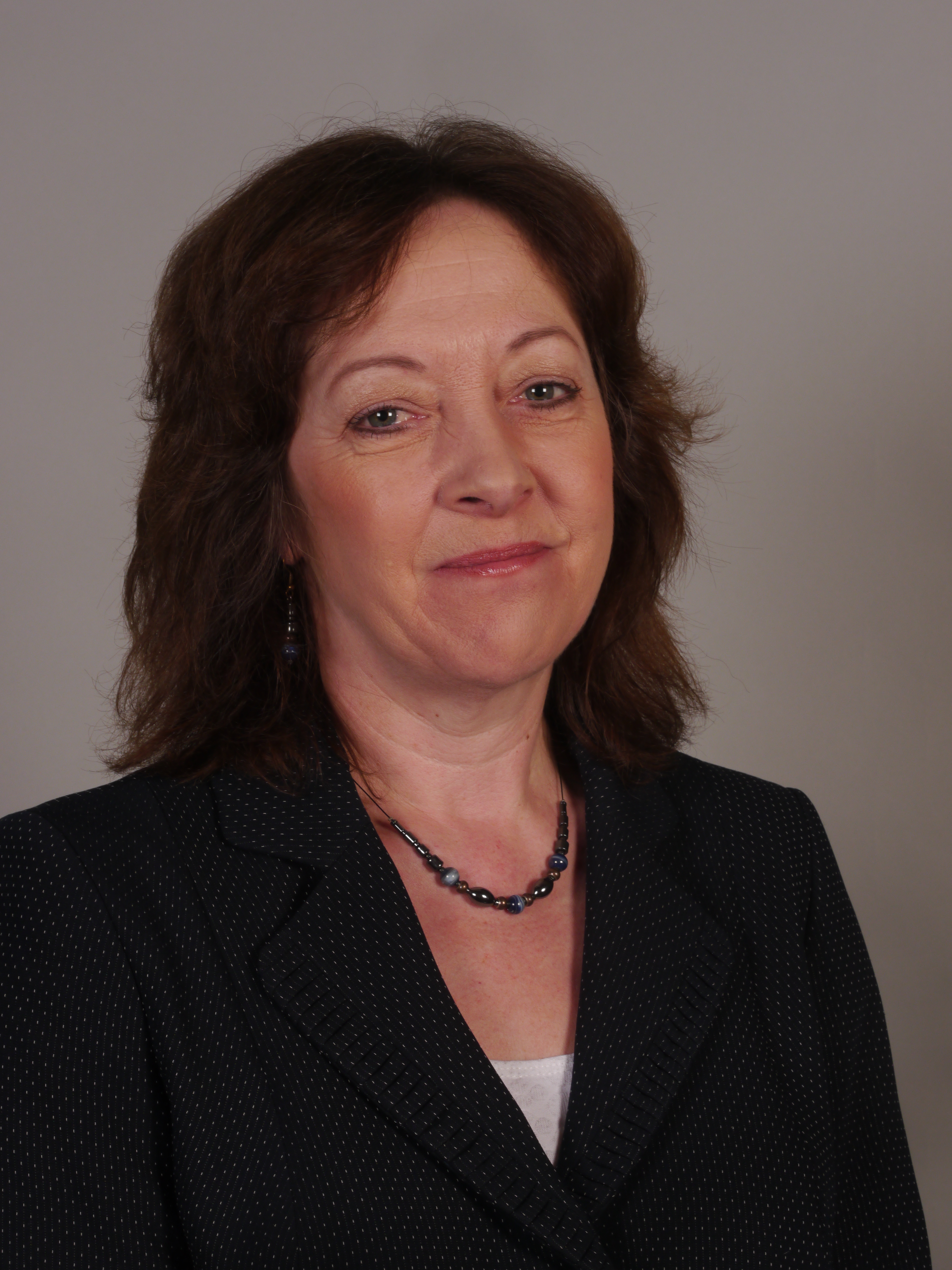
Candidate	Ieuan Wyn Jones	Helen Mary Jones	Jill Evans
First round	4,834	798	598
Percentage	77.6%	12.8%	9.6%
Leader before election
Dafydd Wigley
Elected Leader
Ieuan Wyn Jones

The 2000 Plaid Cymru leadership election was held following the resignation on health grounds of Dafydd Wigley.

Wigley had led the party since 1991 and saw them make a surprise breakthrough in the 1999 Assembly elections winning 17 seats and almost a third of the popular vote.

The role of leader, at this point, was combined with the role of Party President.

Three candidates stood. MEP for Wales Jill Evans, Ynys Mon AM and MP Ieuan Wyn Jones and Llanelli AM Helen Mary Jones

The contest was won by Ieuan Wyn Jones with 77.6% of the vote in the first round.

== Results ==
Candidate	Votes	%
Ieuan Wyn Jones	4,834	77.6
Helen Mary Jones	798	12.8
Jill Evans	598	9.6
Total	6,230	100
