= One Wales =

2007 Welsh government coalition

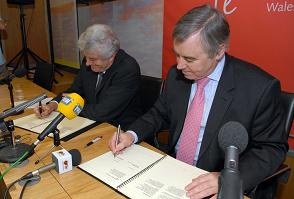
Rhodri Morgan (left) and Ieuan Wyn Jones (right) sign the One Wales coalition agreement

One Wales (Welsh: Cymru'n Un [ˈkəmrɨn ˈɨn]) was the coalition agreement for the National Assembly for Wales between Labour and Plaid Cymru agreed to by Rhodri Morgan, First Minister of Wales and leader of Welsh Labour, and Ieuan Wyn Jones, leader of Plaid Cymru, on 27 June 2007. It was negotiated in the wake of the preceding National Assembly election which resulted in a large Labour plurality, but no majority. Labour and Plaid Cymru approved the document in separate votes on 6 and 7 July, respectively.

== History ==
On 3 May 2007, Labour won 26 of 60 seats in the 2007 National Assembly for Wales election, four short of an effective majority of 30 (see Speaker Denison's rule for an explanation of why this is so). Originally, commentators had predicted a Labour-Welsh Liberal Democrats coalition, after a previous coalition which had lasted from 2000 until 2003. Liberal Democrat leader Mike German, who had served as Deputy First Minister of Wales in the previous coalition, favoured the deal, which would have given the Government a majority of four. However, concerns within his party about propping up a weakened Labour party prevented such an agreement. An alternative option, the so-called "rainbow coalition" of Plaid Cymru, the Liberal Democrats and the Conservatives, was negotiated between the leaders of those parties in mid-May, but was rejected at a Liberal Democrat special conference vote on 23 May. The new Assembly formally opened two days later with no clear majority, and Rhodri Morgan was elected First Minister unopposed at the head of a minority government.

After one month of minority government, talks between Ieuan Wyn Jones and Rhodri Morgan resulted in the One Wales agreement between Labour and Plaid Cymru, giving the Government a majority of 22. The agreement was criticised by some Labour members as too conciliatory towards Plaid Cymru's nationalist leanings, especially in that it included a provision requiring a referendum on full law-making powers for the National Assembly for Wales, in line with the Scottish Parliament. However, the Labour party agreed to the plan by a wide margin on 6 July. Plaid Cymru's membership approved the plan on 7 July. Negotiations on cabinet posts in the new government were scheduled to take place starting 9 July, but Morgan fell ill the night before. The next day, he had surgery to insert stents into on two partially blocked arteries. He was released from the hospital a few days later, and negotiations concluded on 19 July. Three Plaid Cymru AMs would serve as full ministers alongside six Labour members, with four deputy ministers from Labour and one from Plaid Cymru. The only Labour member to be struck from the government as a result of the deal was Deputy Economy and Transport Minister Huw Lewis, who had previously opposed the One Wales deal.

In March 2010 Labour and Plaid Cymru AMs refused to cross the PCS union picket line. The First Minister Carwyn Jones stated that it was in the Welsh Labour party's political thinking not to cross a picket line. The Welsh Conservative Party and the Welsh Liberal Democrats condemned the One Wales government for not attending Assembly business.

== Content ==
Promotional logo for the One Wales coalition agreement

The first page of the agreement states that it "delivers a progressive, stable and ambitious programme for government over this Assembly term." Under its terms, Ieuan Wyn Jones became Deputy First Minister and Rhodri Morgan remained First Minister. Other posts were divided up among members of the two parties by Morgan in consultation with Jones.

The key policy proposals of the deal focused on increasing the amount of affordable housing in Wales through various incentives and schemes; investing in a comprehensive rail programme to link North Wales and South Wales more effectively; instituting a moratorium on community hospital reforms and promising to "agree and implement a new approach to health service reconfiguration" when "there is a local agreement on the way forward"; a new commission to tackle climate change problems and alternative energy questions; and, most controversially, an agreement to hold a referendum on new law-making powers for the National Assembly in the vein of those previously granted to the Scottish Parliament. The text also stated that Plaid Cymru and Labour had agreed "in good faith to campaign for a successful outcome to such a referendum."

This last section was criticised by Welsh Labour MPs Paul Murphy, Don Touhig, and Kim Howells, Minister of State at the Foreign and Commonwealth Office, who claimed it would lead "nationalists to the gates of independence."

The referendum was held on 3 March 2011. The outcome was 'yes', with 63.49% of the participants for and 36.51% against; 35.2% of the electorate participated.

== Analysis ==
The agreement was seen variously as a first step towards independence, a sell-out on Plaid's part that propped up a Labour government, and part of a wider shift towards nationalism in the British Isles. According to polling by the BBC in January 2007, only 20% of Welsh voters favoured independence, but 22.4% of Welsh voters supported Plaid Cymru — just one of a number of nationalist parties and candidates in the 2007 Assembly election. This was put down to more general dissatisfaction with Labour's Tony Blair in the media, suggesting that any growth in nationalist sentiment might have been less important to the electorate's shift away from Labour than Westminster political scandals.

== One Wales Delivery Plan 2007–2011 ==
The Welsh Government published the One Wales Delivery Plan 2007-2011, setting out 228 specific commitments in One Wales to be delivered by April 2011. Each section of the plan included a vision statement and success criteria.

== See also ==
- Politics of the United Kingdom
- Nick Bourne, Leader of the Welsh Conservatives and Leader of the Opposition designate in the Assembly at the time of the One Wales agreement
- 2007 Scottish Parliament election on the same day as the Welsh one, resulting in a Scottish National Party minority government.
- 2021 Welsh Labour–Plaid Cymru agreement (a non-coalition agreement after the 2021 Senedd election)
