= Dafydd Wigley =

Welsh politician (born 1943)

The Right Honourable The Lord Wigley PC
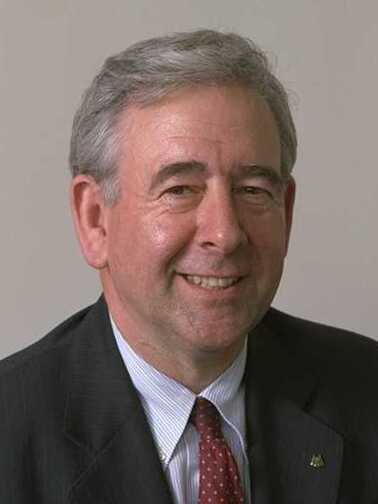
- Official portrait, 1999

Leader of Plaid Cymru (Note: The Party leader was referred to as the president until March 2000 when the separate role of Leader was created)
- In office 24 September 1991 – 3 August 2000
- Preceded by: Dafydd Elis-Thomas
- Succeeded by: Ieuan Wyn Jones
- In office 1 November 1981 – 27 October 1984
- Preceded by: Gwynfor Evans
- Succeeded by: Dafydd Elis-Thomas

Member of the Welsh Assembly for Caernarfon
- In office 6 May 1999 – 1 May 2003
- Preceded by: Office Created
- Succeeded by: Alun Ffred Jones

Member of Parliament for Caernarfon
- In office 28 February 1974 – 14 May 2001
- Preceded by: Goronwy Roberts
- Succeeded by: Hywel Williams

Member of the House of Lords
- Lord Temporal
- Life peerage 19 January 2011

Personal details
- Born: David Wigley; 1 April 1943 (age 83) Derby, England
- Party: Plaid Cymru
- Spouse: Elinor Bennett
- Education: Rydal School
- Alma mater: Victoria University of Manchester

Dafydd Wynne Wigley, Baron Wigley, PC (born David Wigley; 1 April 1943) is a Welsh politician who served as the leader of Plaid Cymru from 1981 to 1984 and again from 1991 to 2000. He served as the Member of Parliament (MP) for Caernarfon from 1974 to 2001 and as the Member of the Welsh Assembly for Caernarfon from 1999 to 2003. In 2010, Wigley was granted life peerage, taking his seat in the House of Lords in 2011, making him one of the party's only two members of that chamber (alongside Carmen Smith, Baroness Smith of Llanfaes).

== Early life ==
Wigley was born in Derby, England, the only child of Welsh parents Elfyn Edward Wigley and Myfanwy Batterbee. He attended Caernarfon grammar school and Rydal School before going on to the Victoria University of Manchester.

Before becoming a Plaid Cymru MP for Caernarfon, Wigley worked for Ford Motor Company, Mars and Hoover.

== Political career ==
In May 1972 Wigley became a councillor on the pre-1974 Merthyr Tydfil County Borough Council, winning in the Park, Merthyr Tydfil ward, with the sitting Labour councillor in third place.

=== UK Parliament ===
Wigley was elected as a Plaid Cymru councillor for Merthyr Tydfil in 1972 and was then the MP for Caernarfon from 1974 until 2001, first elected at the February 1974 general election.

The election for president was seen as instrumental in deciding the future direction of Plaid Cymru. Wigley represented a moderate, pragmatic social democracy, in sharp contrast with rival candidate Dafydd Elis-Thomas's socialism. In 1981 Wigley won the presidency, but Elis Thomas had greater influence over the party's ideology throughout the 1980s. In 1984 Wigley resigned from the presidency because of his children's health, but he returned in 1991 for a second term after the resignation of Elis Thomas. Wigley led Plaid until 2000. He stood down as a Member of Parliament at the 2001 General Election to concentrate on his role in the Assembly. Having served 27 years as an MP, Wigley is the longest-ever serving post-war MP from a nationalist party.

=== National Assembly for Wales ===
Wigley was the Assembly member for Caernarfon from 1999 to 2003.

=== House of Lords ===
He secured a Plaid Cymru nomination for a peerage alongside Eurfyl ap Gwilym and Janet Davies. He initially withdrew his candidature after complaining about how long the process was taking.

On 19 November 2010 it was announced that he had been granted a life peerage by the Queen, and he took his seat in the House of Lords as Baron Wigley, of Caernarfon in the County of Gwynedd on 24 January 2011, supported by fellow Plaid peer Lord Elis-Thomas and by Lord Faulkner of Worcester. He made his maiden speech on 27 January during a debate on tourism. Having been one of the first MPs to take the House of Commons oath of allegiance in the Welsh language in 1974, he took the oath of allegiance in Welsh on entering the Lords.

In 2015, Wigley was accused of Holocaust trivialization for comparing the Trident base in Scotland to Auschwitz concentration camp. He later apologised for his remarks.

In 2024, Wigley criticised the Senedd Reform Bill due to the introduction of a closed list PR system for elections to the Senedd.

== Personal life ==
He married the Welsh harpist Elinor Bennett. The couple had four children, son Hywel Wigley and daughter Eluned Wigley as well as two sons, Alun and Geraint, who died of a genetic illness. His sons' condition influenced the direction of his career, and he took a strong interest in the affairs of disabled people, being vice-chairman of the Parliamentary all-party disablement group, vice-president of Disability Wales, vice-president of Mencap (Wales), former president of the Spastics' Society of Wales and sponsor of the Disabled Persons Act in 1981. In 2003 Wigley became Pro-Chancellor of the University of Wales.

Wigley is the third cousin of the American gangster Murray Humphreys.

== Awards ==
In 2008, Wigley was awarded an Honorary Chair in Business at Bangor University.

He was awarded an Doctor of Letters (DLitt) degree for his contribution to Welsh Culture, Language and Heritage in 2023 by Bangor University.

== Notes ==
Parliament of the United Kingdom
Preceded by Goronwy Roberts	Member of Parliament for Caernarfon; Feb. 1974 – 2001	Succeeded by Hywel Williams
Senedd
New office	Assembly Member for Caernarfon; 1999 – 2003	Succeeded by Alun Ffred Jones
Political offices
Preceded by Gwynfor Evans	President of Plaid Cymru; 1981–1984	Succeeded by Dafydd Elis-Thomas
Preceded by Dafydd Elis-Thomas	President of Plaid Cymru; 1991–2000	Succeeded by Ieuan Wyn Jones
New office	Leader of Plaid Cymru in the National Assembly for Wales; 1999–2000	Succeeded by Ieuan Wyn Jones
New office	Leader of the Opposition; 1999–2000	Succeeded by Ieuan Wyn Jones
Preceded by Gwynfor Evans	Honorary President of Plaid Cymru; 2005–	Incumbent
Academic offices
Preceded by Gareth Williams	Pro-Chancellor of the University of Wales; 2003–2006	Succeeded by Barry Morgan
Orders of precedence in the United Kingdom
Preceded by The Lord Dannatt	Gentlemen; Baron Wigley	Followed by The Lord Collins of Highbury
