= 1987 Carmarthen District Council election =

Welsh local election

An election to Carmarthen District Council was held on 7 May 1987. It was preceded by the 1983 election and followed by the 1991 election. On the same day there were elections to the other district local authorities and community councils in Wales.

== Boundary changes ==
A limited number of boundary changes had taken place since the previous election. Some wards were also renamed.

== Results ==
=== Abergwili (one seat) ===
The ward used to be known as Abergwili and Llanllawddog. The winning candidate had represented the SDP-Liberal Alliance at the 1983 election.

Abergwili and Llanllawddog 1987
Party	Candidate	Votes	%	±%
Independent	Pamela Ann Palmer	336		
Independent	Simon John Howells	294		
Independent	Trevor Hugh Davies	157		
Independent	Ronald Hugh Richards	152		
Labour	T. Greenfield	82		
Majority		42		
Turnout			73.0	
Independent hold		Swing		

=== Carmarthen Town North (four seats) ===
The ward used to be known as Carmarthen Town Ward One. Two of the sitting Labour candidates were de-selected by the party, but stood successfully as independents.

Carmarthen Town North 1987
Party	Candidate	Votes	%	±%
Independent	David Howell Merriman*	1,273		
Labour	John Russell Davies*	1,111		
Independent	John Elfed Williams*	1,080		
Independent	T.H. Gwynne Davies*	997		
Plaid Cymru	Peter Hughes Griffiths	924		
Labour	Kenneth Wigley Lloyd	885		
Labour	Richard John Williams	646		
Independent hold		Swing		
Labour hold		Swing		
Independent gain from Labour		Swing		
Independent gain from Labour		Swing		

=== Carmarthen Town South (two seats) ===
The ward used to be known as Carmarthen Town Ward Two.

Carmarthen Town South 1987
Party	Candidate	Votes	%	±%
Independent	June Williams	704		
Independent	John Elfed Thomas*	653		
Alliance (Liberal)	Richard John Goodridge	533		
Labour	Richard John Edwards	431		
Plaid Cymru	Geraint Thomas	427		
Independent hold		Swing		
Independent hold		Swing		

=== Carmarthen Town West (three seats) ===
The ward used to be known as Carmarthen Town Ward Three. David Crane had been elected at a by-election following the resignation of previous Liberal councillor David Nam.

Carmarthen Town West 1987
Party	Candidate	Votes	%	±%
Alliance	David Llewhelin Crane*	1,268		
Independent	Helen Margaret Thomas*	1,047		
Plaid Cymru	Malcolm Morgan Jones	990		
Labour	Sarah Mary Lorraine Maynard	748		
Alliance hold		Swing		
Independent hold		Swing		
Plaid Cymru gain from Independent		Swing		

=== Cenarth (one seat) ===
The ward used to be known as Newcastle Emlyn.

Cenarth 1987
Party	Candidate	Votes	%	±%
Independent	David Lloyd Davies*	Unopposed		
Independent hold				

=== Clynderwen (one seat) ===
The ward used to be known as Cilymaenllwyd.

Clynderwen 1987
Party	Candidate	Votes	%	±%
Independent	Daniel Clodwyn Thomas*	Unopposed		
Independent hold				

=== Cynwyl Elfed (one seat) ===
The ward used to be known as Cynwyl Elfed and Llanpumsaint.

Cynwyl Elfed 1987
Party	Candidate	Votes	%	±%
Independent	William Dorrien Thomas	304		
Independent	Thomas Owen Morgan	215		
Independent	William Malcolm Howells	177		
Independent	Lyn Luke ap Trin Davies	142		
Independent	James Kinneil Fraser	66		
Independent	John Henry Dyer	30		
Majority		89		
Independent hold		Swing		

=== Gorslas (two seats) ===
The previous three-member Llanarthney and Llanddarog ward was split into a two-member ward (Gorslas) and a single-member ward (Llanddarog).

Gorslas 1987
Party	Candidate	Votes	%	±%
Ratepayers	Dewi Wyn Edwards*	1,240		
Labour	Ryan Jones	1,102		
Independent	Jane Ann Jones	649		
Ratepayers hold		Swing		
Labour hold		Swing		

=== Laugharne Township (one seat) ===
The previous two-member Laugharne Township ward was split into a two single-member wards (Laugharne Township and Llanddowror). The sitting member had been elected at a by-election following the death of Elwyn John.

Laugharne Township 1987
Party	Candidate	Votes	%	±%
Independent	Sidney William David Evans*	356		
Independent	David Cecil Davies	331		
Majority		25		
Independent hold		Swing		

=== Llanboidy (one seat) ===
The ward used to be known as Henllanfallteg.

Llanboidy 1987
Party	Candidate	Votes	%	±%
Independent	John Gibbin*	Unopposed		
Independent hold				

=== Llanddarog (one seat) ===
The previous three-member Llanarthney and Llanddarog ward was split into a two-member ward (Gorslas) and a single-member ward (Llanddarog).

Llanddarog 1987
Party	Candidate	Votes	%	±%
Ratepayers	Huw Voyle Williams*	Unopposed		
Ratepayers hold		Swing		

=== Llanddowror (one seat) ===
The previous two-member Laugharne Township ward was split into a two single-member wards (Laugharne Township and Llanddowror).

Llanddowror 1987
Party	Candidate	Votes	%	±%
Independent	Cyril William Roberts*	479		
Independent	Dafydd Meredith Price	294		
Majority		185		
Independent hold		Swing		

=== Llandyfaelog (one seat) ===
The previous two-member Llandyfaelog ward was split into a two single-member wards (Llandyfaelog and St Ishmaels).

Llandyfaelog 1987
Party	Candidate	Votes	%	±%
Independent	Sidney Daniel John*	Unopposed		
Independent win (new seat)				

=== Llanfihangel-ar-Arth (one seat) ===
The seat had been won by Plaid Cymru at a by-election.

Llanfihangel-ar-Arth 1987
Party	Candidate	Votes	%	±%
Plaid Cymru	Thomas John Griffiths*	Unopposed		
Plaid Cymru hold				

=== Llangeler (two seats) ===
Llangeler 1987
Party	Candidate	Votes	%	±%
Independent	Thomas Keith Davies*	Unopposed		
Independent	Thomas Wilfred Davies*	Unopposed		
Independent hold				
Independent hold				

=== Llangynnwr (two seats) ===
Boundary change: the previous ward was divided to create an additional Newchurch ward.

Llangynnwr 1987
Party	Candidate	Votes	%	±%
Independent	Robin Owen Griffiths	839		
Independent	Hywel Lloyd Williams*	650		
Independent	John David James Morgan*	499		
Independent	Jean Stuart Arnold	333		
Independent hold		Swing		
Independent hold		Swing		

=== Llangyndeyrn (two seats) ===
Llangyndeyrn 1987
Party	Candidate	Votes	%	±%
Labour	John David Greville Williams	727		
Labour	Cydwel David Thomas Evans	674		
Plaid Cymru	Handel Michael Ayres Williams	646		
Alliance	Emlyn Jones	471		
Alliance	Robert Michael Beynon	435		
Labour hold		Swing		
Labour hold		Swing		

=== Llanllwni (one seat) ===
The ward used to be known as Llanfihangel Rhos-y-Corn.

Llanllwni 1987
Party	Candidate	Votes	%	±%
Independent	Evan Eirwyn Jones*	365		
Alliance	Roger Nook	133		
Independent	Leonard William Davies	79		
Independent	Roger Joynson	49		
Majority		232		
Independent hold		Swing		

=== Llansteffan (one seat) ===
The ward used to be known as Llangain.

Llansteffan 1987
Party	Candidate	Votes	%	±%
Independent	Griffith Trevor Rees*	446		
Independent	William Thomas	356		
Alliance	John Dickson Bain	282		
Majority		90		
Independent hold		Swing		

=== Llanybydder (one seat) ===
The previous two-member Llanllwni ward was split into a two single-member wards (Llanybydder and Pencarreg).

Llanybydder 1987
Party	Candidate	Votes	%	±%
Independent	John Emrys Oriel Jones*	Unopposed		
Independent win (new seat)				

=== Newchurch (one seat) ===
This additional ward was created following the division of the Llangynnwr ward, which retained two seats.

Newchurch 1987
Party	Candidate	Votes	%	±%
Independent	Mary Anne Griffiths	324		
Independent	Evan James Thomas	240		
Independent	Lyn Lewis Thomas	164		
Majority		84		
Independent win (new seat)				

=== Pencarreg (one seats) ===
The previous two-member Llanllwni ward was split into a two single-member wards (Llanybydder and Pencarreg).

Pencarreg 1987
Party	Candidate	Votes	%	±%
Independent	Oliver Williams*	Unopposed		
Independent win (new seat)				

=== St Clears (two seats) ===
St Clears 1987
Party	Candidate	Votes	%	±%
Independent	Victor Lawrence James*	Unopposed		
Independent	Benjamin Delwyn Royden Thomas*	Unopposed		
Independent hold				
Independent hold				

=== St Ishmael (one seat) ===
The previous two-member Llandyfaelog ward was split into a two single-member wards (Llandyfaelog and St Ishmaels).

St Ishmaels 1987
Party	Candidate	Votes	%	±%
Independent	David Charles Phillips*	593		
Labour	Christopher George Henry	124		
Majority				
Independent hold		Swing		

=== Trelech (one seat) ===
The ward used to be known as Abernant.

Trelech 1987
Party	Candidate	Votes	%	±%
Independent	William David Thomas*	Unopposed		
Independent hold				

=== Whitland (one seat) ===
Whitland 1983
Party	Candidate	Votes	%	±%
Independent	Rosemary Jean Jenkins	469		
Plaid Cymru	Ithel Parri-Roberts	358		
Majority		111		
Independent gain from Alliance		Swing		
