= Preseli Pembrokeshire (disambiguation) =

Preseli Pembrokeshire may refer to:

- Preseli Pembrokeshire, a district in Wales, 1974-1996
- Preseli Pembrokeshire (UK Parliament constituency), a constituency of the House of Commons of the Parliament of the United Kingdom
- Preseli Pembrokeshire (Senedd constituency), a constituency of the Senedd
