= Mary Macpherson =

Mary Amelia Macpherson was a British socialist activist.

Born as Mary Amelia Foster, she studied at the Bedford Ladies College, London. In 1896, she married Fenton Macpherson, who later became Foreign Editor of the Daily Mail. She lived for a time in Paris, where she became a socialist and trade unionist, but later returned to London. There, she joined the Independent Labour Party and took a prominent role in campaigning in the 1897 Barnsley by-election. She was also part of the Clarion movement, and organised the Clarion Van tour of the West of England in 1897.

Macpherson retained links with the French socialist movement, as the English correspondent of Le Mouvement Socialiste. She also became the London representative of the Labour Leader, and contributed to the Railway Review under the pseudonym "Margery Daw".

In 1898, Macpherson joined the Fabian Society, and she served on its executive for a year in 1900/01. That year, she organised a conference of wives of members of the Amalgamated Society of Railway Servants, which formed the Railway Women's Guild. Under her guidance, this guild became supportive of the Labour Representation Committee, and passed a motion calling on it to form a women's committee. Macpherson wrote to Ramsay Macdonald, proposing this, and after initial resistance, it was founded as the Women's Labour League. Macpherson served on its early executives.

Party political offices
Preceded by New position	Secretary of the Women's Labour League; 1906–1907	Succeeded by Mary Middleton
