= 1991 Carmarthen District Council election =

Welsh local election

An election to Carmarthen District Council was held on 2 May 1991. It was preceded by the 1987 election and followed, after local government reorganization, by the first election to Carmarthenshire County Council in 1995. On the same day there were elections to the other district local authorities and community councils in Wales.

== Overview ==
There were some limited changes as a result of the election, including the capture of three seats by the Labour Party in Carmarthen Town.

== Results ==
=== Abergwili (one seat) ===
Abergwili 1991
Party	Candidate	Votes	%	±%
Independent	Pamela Ann Palmer*	unopposed		
Independent hold		Swing		

=== Carmarthen Town North (four seats) ===
Carmarthen Town North 1991
Party	Candidate	Votes	%	±%
Independent	David Howell Merriman*	1,215		
Labour	John Russell Davies*	1,079		
Labour	Sarah Mary Lorraine Maynard	1,056		
Independent	John Elfed Williams*	1,019		
Plaid Cymru	Peter Hughes Griffiths	984		
Labour	Nia Rhiannon Griffith	731		
Labour	Richard John Williams	638		
Independent hold		Swing		
Labour hold		Swing		
Labour gain from Independent		Swing		
Independent hold		Swing		

=== Carmarthen Town South (two seats) ===
Carmarthen Town South 1991
Party	Candidate	Votes	%	±%
Liberal Democrats	Dr Margaret Elizabeth Evans	1,113		
Independent	June Williams*	719		
Independent	John Elfed Thomas*	532		
Plaid Cymru	Geraint Thomas	313		
Labour	Judy Marged Morgan Stenger	201		
Labour	Thomas Julian Messsere	182		
Liberal Democrats gain from Independent		Swing		
Independent hold		Swing		

=== Carmarthen Town West (three seats) ===
An Independent candidate had won a seat at a by-election following the resignation of Plaid Cymru councilor Malcolm Jones.

Carmarthen Town West 1991
Party	Candidate	Votes	%	±%
Independent	William Gwynoro Jones	905		
Labour	Sioned Mair Richards	839		
Labour	Maxine Baine Ashley	673		
Independent	Stephen Paul Dunn	558		
Independent hold		Swing		
Labour gain from Independent		Swing		
Labour gain from Independent		Swing		

=== Cenarth (one seat) ===
Cenarth 1991
Party	Candidate	Votes	%	±%
Independent	David Lloyd Davies*			
Independent hold		Swing		

=== Clynderwen (one seat) ===
Clynderwen 1987
Party	Candidate	Votes	%	±%
Independent	Daniel Clodwyn Thomas*	unopposed		
Independent hold		Swing		

=== Cynwyl Elfed (one seat) ===
Cynwyl Elfed 1991
Party	Candidate	Votes	%	±%
Independent	William Dorrien Thomas	unopposed		
Independent hold		Swing		

=== Gorslas (two seats) ===
Gorslas 1991
Party	Candidate	Votes	%	±%
Ratepayers	Dewi Wyn Edwards*	1,187		
Labour	Ryan Jones*	1,092		
Labour	William Peter Thomas Griffiths	849		
Ratepayers hold		Swing		
Labour hold		Swing		

=== Laugharne Township (one seat) ===
Laugharne Township 1991
Party	Candidate	Votes	%	±%
Independent	Sidney William David Evans*	415		
Independent	David Cecil Davies	290		
Independent	John Jenkins	50		
Majority		125		
Independent hold		Swing		

=== Llanboidy (one seat) ===
Llanboidy 1991
Party	Candidate	Votes	%	±%
Independent	John Gibbin*	unopposed		
Independent hold		Swing		

=== Llanddarog (one seat) ===
Llanddarog 1991
Party	Candidate	Votes	%	±%
Ratepayers	Huw Voyle Williams*	unopposed		
Ratepayers hold		Swing		

=== Llanddowror (one seat) ===
Llanddowror 1991
Party	Candidate	Votes	%	±%
Independent	Cyril William Roberts*	unopposed		
Independent hold		Swing		

=== Llandyfaelog (one seat) ===
Llandyfaelog 1991
Party	Candidate	Votes	%	±%
Independent	Sidney Daniel John*	374		
Independent	Lydia Mair Stephens	301		
Majority		73		
Independent hold		Swing		

=== Llanfihangel-ar-Arth (one seat) ===
Llanfihangel-ar-Arth 1991
Party	Candidate	Votes	%	±%
Plaid Cymru	Thomas John Griffiths*	unopposed		
Plaid Cymru hold		Swing		

=== Llangeler (two seats) ===
Llangeler 1991
Party	Candidate	Votes	%	±%
Independent	Thomas Keith Davies*	unopposed		
Independent	Thomas Wilfred Davies*	unopposed		
Independent hold		Swing		
Independent hold		Swing		

=== Llangynnwr (two seats) ===
Llangynnwr 1991
Party	Candidate	Votes	%	±%
Independent	Robin Owen Griffiths*	998		
Independent	Hywel Lloyd Williams*	517		
Labour	June Angela Jenkins	429		
Independent hold		Swing		
Independent hold		Swing		

=== Llangyndeyrn (two seats) ===
Llangyndeyrn 1991
Party	Candidate	Votes	%	±%
Labour	John David Greville Williams*	742		
Independent	Robert Michael Beynon	688		
Labour	Cydwel David Thomas Evans*	660		
Labour hold		Swing		
Independent gain from Labour		Swing		

=== Llanllwni (one seat) ===
Llanllwni 1991
Party	Candidate	Votes	%	±%
Independent	Evan Eirwyn Jones*	unopposed		
Independent hold		Swing		

=== Llansteffan (one seat) ===
Llansteffan 1991
Party	Candidate	Votes	%	±%
Independent	Una Burnett Davies	490		
Independent	Thomas John Jones	376		
Independent	Margaret Edith Jenkins	149		
Independent	Terence Davies Hesford	134		
Majority		114		
Independent hold		Swing		

=== Llanybydder (one seat) ===
Llanybydder 1991
Party	Candidate	Votes	%	±%
Independent	John Emrys Oriel Jones*	774		
Labour	Patricia Anne Stevens-Bevan	114		
Majority		660		
Independent hold		Swing		

=== Newchurch (one seat) ===
Newchurch 1991
Party	Candidate	Votes	%	±%
Independent	Henry Irfon Jones*	unopposed		
Independent hold		Swing		

=== Pencarreg (one seat) ===
Pencarreg 1991
Party	Candidate	Votes	%	±%
Independent	Ambrose Goring Lloyd	370		
Independent	James Eirwyn Williams	327		
Majority		43		
Independent hold		Swing		

=== St Clears (two seats) ===
St Clears 1991
Party	Candidate	Votes	%	±%
Independent	Arwyn Ungoed Owen			
Independent	David Price Phillips			
Independent hold		Swing		
Independent hold		Swing		

=== St Ishmael (one seat) ===
St Ishmaels 1991
Party	Candidate	Votes	%	±%
Independent	David Charles Phillips*	unopposed		
Independent hold		Swing		

=== Trelech (one seat) ===
Trelech 1991
Party	Candidate	Votes	%	±%
Independent	William David Thomas*	unopposed		
Independent hold		Swing		

=== Whitland (one seat) ===
Whitland 1991
Party	Candidate	Votes	%	±%
Plaid Cymru	Ithel Parri-Roberts	581		
Independent	Rosemary Jean Jenkins*	248		
Majority				
Plaid Cymru gain from Independent		Swing		
