= 1973 Preseli District Council election =

UK local government election

The first election to Preseli District Council was held in April 1973. It was followed by the 1976 election. On the same day there were elections to the other District local authorities and community councils in Wales.

== Results ==
=== Ambleston (one seat) ===
Ambleston 1973
Party	Candidate	Votes	%	±%
Independent	J. Griffiths	241		
Independent	W. Ridge	96		
Majority				
Independent win (new seat)				

=== Burton (one seat) ===
Burton 1973
Party	Candidate	Votes	%	±%
Independent	W. Goodridge	418		
Independent	G. Rees	324		
Independent	W.R. Jenkins	161		
Independent	G. Wells	49		
Majority				
Independent win (new seat)				

=== Boulston (one seat) ===
Boulston 1973
Party	Candidate	Votes	%	±%
Independent	J. Griffiths	241		
Independent	W. Ridge	96		
Majority				
Independent win (new seat)				

=== Camrose (one seat) ===
Camrose 1973
Party	Candidate	Votes	%	±%
Independent	G. Absalom	Unopposed		
Independent win (new seat)				

=== Clydey and Llanfyrnach (one seat) ===
Clydey and Llanfyrnach 1973
Party	Candidate	Votes	%	±%
Independent	W.S. Rees	Unopposed		
Independent win (new seat)				

=== Eglwyswrw (one seat) ===
Eglwyswrw 1973
Party	Candidate	Votes	%	±%
Independent	Edward Glyndwr Vaughan	Unopposed		
Independent win (new seat)				

=== Fishguard (three seats) ===
Fishguard 1973
Party	Candidate	Votes	%	±%
Independent	Dilys Davies Evans	1,184		
Independent	M.P. Sparkes	972		
Independent	D. James	697		
Independent	A. O'Brien	425		
Independent win (new seat)				
Independent win (new seat)				
Independent win (new seat)				

=== Freystrop and Llangwm (one seat) ===
Freystrop and Llangwm 1973
Party	Candidate	Votes	%	±%
Independent	J. Evans	420		
Independent	E. Harries	395		
Independent	W. Allen	114		
Majority				
Independent win (new seat)				

=== Goodwick (one seat) ===
Goodwick 1983
Party	Candidate	Votes	%	±%
Independent	William Lloyd Evans*	565		
Independent	Mrs M. Jackman	182		
Majority				
Independent win (new seat)				

=== Haverfordwest Ward One (three seats) ===
Haverfordwest Ward One 1973
Party	Candidate	Votes	%	±%
Independent	Mrs C.M. Cole	768		
Independent	V. Noott	617		
Independent	G. Jones	514		
Independent	G. Morgan	414		
Independent	R. Davies	251		
Independent	A. Kersey	205		
Independent win (new seat)				
Independent win (new seat)				
Independent win (new seat)				

=== Haverfordwest Ward Two (three seats) ===
Haverfordwest Ward Two 1973
Party	Candidate	Votes	%	±%
Independent	T. Arran	861		
Independent	G. Green	656		
Independent	A. Norman	656		
Independent	D. Evans	374		
Independent win (new seat)				
Independent win (new seat)				
Independent win (new seat)				

=== Henry's Moat (one seat) ===
Henry's Moat 1973
Party	Candidate	Votes	%	±%
Independent	B. Griffiths	Unopposed		
Independent win (new seat)				

=== Johnston (one seat) ===
Johnston 1983
Party	Candidate	Votes	%	±%
Independent	George Charles Grey*	317		
Labour	J.A.D. Mackeen	273		
Independent	R.J.C. Tibbs	122		
Majority				
Independent win (new seat)				

=== Kilgerran and Manordeifi (one seat) ===
Kilgerran and Manordeifi 1983
Party	Candidate	Votes	%	±%
Independent	J.M. Davies*	unopposed		
Independent win (new seat)				

=== Llanwnda (one seat) ===
Llanwnda 1973
Party	Candidate	Votes	%	±%
Independent	B. Lewis	238		
Independent	Alwyn Cadwallader Luke	162		
Independent	M. Harries	127		
Independent	J. Morgan	49		
Majority				
Independent win (new seat)				

=== Mathry (one seat) ===
Mathry 1973
Party	Candidate	Votes	%	±%
Independent	William Leslie Raymond	Unopposed		
Independent win (new seat)				

=== Milford Haven, Central and East (three seats) ===
Milford Haven, Central and East 1973
Party	Candidate	Votes	%	±%
Independent	E. Jones	1,177		
Independent	E. Grove	1,031		
Independent	J. Germaine	823		
Independent	G. Adams	628		
Independent win (new seat)				
Independent win (new seat)				
Independent win (new seat)				

=== Milford Haven, Hakin and Hubberston (three seats) ===
Milford Haven, Hakin and Hubberston 1973
Party	Candidate	Votes	%	±%
Independent	V. Lewis	2,100		
Independent	F. Smedley	1,607		
Independent	Mrs J. Edwards	1,186		
Independent	J. King	1,109		
Independent win (new seat)				
Independent win (new seat)				
Independent win (new seat)				

=== Milford Haven, North and West (three seats) ===
Milford Haven, North and West 1973
Party	Candidate	Votes	%	±%
Independent	S. Jones	1,421		
Independent	E. Gough	1,087		
Independent	Barrie Thomas Woolmer	1,062		
Independent	F.D.G. Jones	816		
Independent	T.W.H. Byard	407		
Independent win (new seat)				
Independent win (new seat)				
Independent win (new seat)				

=== Nevern (one seat) ===
Nevern 1983
Party	Candidate	Votes	%	±%
Independent	E.G. Vaughan	unopposed		
Independent win (new seat)				

=== Newport (one seat) ===
Newport 1983
Party	Candidate	Votes	%	±%
Independent	C. Davies	407		
Independent	A.G. Rees	325		
Independent	S.H.H. Davies	199		
Majority				
Independent win (new seat)				

=== Neyland (two seats) ===
Neyland 1983
Party	Candidate	Votes	%	±%
Independent	D.N. Doyne*	510		
Labour	P.J. Murphy	496		
Independent	Mrs I.L. Charles*	384		
Independent win (new seat)				
Independent win (new seat)				

=== St David's (one seat) ===
St David's 1973
Party	Candidate	Votes	%	±%
Independent	D. Morgan	432		
Independent	J. Morris	377		
Majority				
Independent win (new seat)				

=== St Dogmaels (one seat) ===
St Dogmaels 1983
Party	Candidate	Votes	%	±%
Independent	Halket Jones*	unopposed		
Independent win (new seat)				

=== St Ishmaels (one seat) ===
St Ishmaels 1983
Party	Candidate	Votes	%	±%
Independent	Mrs Y.C. Evans	unopposed		
Independent win (new seat)				

=== St Thomas and Haroldson St Issels (one seat) ===
St Thomas and Haroldson St Issels 1973
Party	Candidate	Votes	%	±%
Independent	A.J. Webb	Unopposed		
Independent win (new seat)				

=== Steynton (one seat) ===
Steynton 1983
Party	Candidate	Votes	%	±%
Independent	J.W.H. Jarman	unopposed		
Independent win (new seat)				

=== Walwyns Castle (one seat) ===
Walwyns Castle 1983
Party	Candidate	Votes	%	±%
Independent	K.W.J. Rogers	unopposed		
Independent win (new seat)				

=== Whitchurch (one seat) ===
Whitchurch 1973
Party	Candidate	Votes	%	±%
Independent	John Gordon Cawood	540		
Independent	E. Davies	386		
Majority				
Independent win (new seat)				

=== Wiston (one seat) ===
Wiston 1973
Party	Candidate	Votes	%	±%
Independent	W. Evans	518		
Independent	C. Watts	208		
Majority				
Independent win (new seat)				
