= 1987 Preseli Pembrokeshire District Council election =

Local election in Wales

An election to Preseli Pembrokeshire District Council was held in May 1987. It was preceded by the 1983 election and followed by the 1991 election. On the same day there were elections to the other district local authorities and community councils in Wales.

== Boundary Changes ==
There was a slight reduction in the number of seats. Those abolished included Nevern, Steynton, and one of the three seats in both Fishguard and Milford North and West. Other wards were realigned or renamed.

Previous ward	New ward
Ambleston	Letterston
Boulston	Rudbaxton
Clydey and Llanfyrnach	Clydey
Eglwyswrw	Crymych
Freystrop and Llangwm	Llangwm
Haverfordwest Ward One	Haverfordwest Garth
Haverfordwest Ward One	Haverfordwest Castle, Prendergast, Priory (three seats)
Henry's Moat	Dinas Cross
Kilgerran and Manordeifi	Cilgerran
Llanwnda	Scleddau
Mathry	Brawdy
St Thomas and Haroldson St Issels	Merlin's Bridge
Walwyn's Castle	The Havens
Whitchaurch	Solva

== Results ==
=== Brawdy (one seat) ===
Brawdy 1987
Party	Candidate	Votes	%	±%
Independent	William Leslie Raymond*	unopposed		
Independent hold		Swing		

=== Burton (one seat) ===
Burton 1987
Party	Candidate	Votes	%	±%
Independent	J.R. Lewis*	unopposed		
Independent hold		Swing		

=== Camrose (one seat) ===
Camrose 1987
Party	Candidate	Votes	%	±%
Independent	James Desmond Edward Codd*	unopposed		
Independent hold		Swing		

=== Cilgerran (one seat) ===
Cilgerran 1987
Party	Candidate	Votes	%	±%
Independent	Mrs M.C.A. Sullivan*	unopposed		
Independent hold		Swing		

=== Clydey (one seat) ===
Clydey 1987
Party	Candidate	Votes	%	±%
Independent	W.S. Rees*	unopposed		
Independent hold		Swing		

=== Crymych (one seat) ===
Crymych 1987
Party	Candidate	Votes	%	±%
Independent	John Lynn Davies	554		
Independent	E.G. Vaughan*	511		
Independent hold		Swing		

=== Dinas Cross (one seat) ===
Dinas Cross 1987
Party	Candidate	Votes	%	±%
Independent	Alun John Bringley Griffiths	466		
Independent	C. Davies*	362		
Independent hold		Swing		

=== Fishguard (two seats) ===
Fishguard 1987
Party	Candidate	Votes	%	±%
Independent	D. Davies*	941		
Independent	Dilys Davies Evans*	862		
Independent	M.P. Sparkes	635		
Independent hold		Swing		
Independent hold		Swing		

=== Goodwick (one seat) ===
Goodwick 1987
Party	Candidate	Votes	%	±%
Independent	William Lloyd Evans*	unopposed		
Independent hold		Swing		

=== Haverfordwest Castle (one seat) ===
Haverfordwest Castle 1987
Party	Candidate	Votes	%	±%
Independent	W.W. Ladd*	unopposed		
Independent hold		Swing		

=== Haverfordwest Garth (three seats) ===
Haverfordwest Garth 1987
Party	Candidate	Votes	%	±%
Independent	Peter Alan Stock*	1,285		
Independent	Thomas Peter Lewis*	908		
Independent	Mrs C.M. Cole*	794		
Independent	D.J. James	549		
Independent hold		Swing		
Independent hold		Swing		
Independent hold		Swing		

=== Haverfordwest Prendergast (one seat) ===
Haverfordwest Prendergast 1987
Party	Candidate	Votes	%	±%
Independent	W.E.L. Jenkins*	316		
Independent	T.E.G. Thomas*	305		
Independent hold		Swing		

=== Haverfordwest Priory (one seat) ===
Haverfordwest Priory 1987
Party	Candidate	Votes	%	±%
Independent	B.S. Hearne	416		
Independent	A.R.R. Smith	381		
Independent hold		Swing		

=== Johnston (one seat) ===
Johnston 1987
Party	Candidate	Votes	%	±%
Independent	George Charles Grey*	unopposed		
Independent hold		Swing		

=== Letterston (one seat) ===
Letterston 1987
Party	Candidate	Votes	%	±%
Independent	Frank L. Sandall*	unopposed		
Independent hold		Swing		

=== Llangwm (one seat) ===
Llangwm 1987
Party	Candidate	Votes	%	±%
Independent	William Henry Hitchings*	unopposed		
Independent hold		Swing		

=== Maenclochog (one seat) ===
Maenclochog 1987
Party	Candidate	Votes	%	±%
Independent	Mrs N. Drew*	unopposed		
Independent hold		Swing		

=== Merlin's Bridge (one seat) ===
Merlin's Bridge 1987
Party	Candidate	Votes	%	±%
Independent	A.J. Webb*	unopposed		
Independent hold		Swing		

=== Milford Haven, Central and East (three seats) ===
Stan Hudson stood as a Conservative, having not been affiliated to any party at the 1983 election.

Milford Haven, Central and East 1987
Party	Candidate	Votes	%	±%
Alliance	Thomas Hutton Sinclair	1,032		
Conservative	Stanley Thomas Hudson*	772		
Independent	J. Mayne*	651		
Labour	W.J. Morgan	631		
Labour	D.H. Fletcher	568		
Independent	W.J. Owston	491		
Alliance gain from Labour		Swing		
Conservative gain from Independent		Swing		
Independent hold		Swing		

=== Milford Haven, Hakin and Hubberston (three seats) ===
Labour had held one of the three seats in 1983 but it had been subsequently lost at a by-election. Basil Woodruff, the sitting county councillor, won a seat at the expense of another Independent.

Milford Haven, Hakin and Hubberston 1987
Party	Candidate	Votes	%	±%
Independent	Eric Ronald Harries*	1,790		
Labour	Alun E. Byrne	922		
Independent	Basil Ralph Woodruff	920		
Independent	William John Kenneth Williams*	882		
Independent	George Noel William Max*	786		
Labour	V.H. Buckley	628		
Independent hold		Swing		
Labour gain from Independent		Swing		
Independent hold		Swing		

=== Milford Haven, North and West (two seats) ===
The number of seats was reduced from three to two.

Milford Haven, North and West 1987
Party	Candidate	Votes	%	±%
Independent	Edward George Setterfield*	932		
Alliance	Mrs J. Edwards	576		
Independent	Barrie Thomas Woolmer*	514		
Independent	Irwin Edwards*	401		
Labour	Mrs J.T. Ellis	368		
Independent win (new seat)				
Alliance win (new seat)				

=== Newport (one seat) ===
Newport 1987
Party	Candidate	Votes	%	±%
Independent	Elwyn George John	295		
Independent	A.G. Rees	175		
Independent	S.H.H. Davies	99		
Independent	W.E. Jones	94		
Majority				
Independent hold		Swing		

=== Neyland West (one seat) ===
Neyland West 1987
Party	Candidate	Votes	%	±%
		unopposed		
		Swing		

=== Neyland East (one seat) ===
Neyland East 1987
Party	Candidate	Votes	%	±%
Independent	N.D. Hardaker	unopposed		
Independent hold		Swing		

=== Rudbaxton (one seat) ===
Rudbaxton 1987
Party	Candidate	Votes	%	±%
Independent	David Edwin Pritchard*	unopposed		
Independent hold		Swing		

=== St David's (one seat) ===
St David's 1987
Party	Candidate	Votes	%	±%
Independent	W.J. Wilcox*	unopposed		
Independent hold		Swing		

=== St Dogmaels (one seat) ===
St Dogmaels 1987
Party	Candidate	Votes	%	±%
Independent	Halket Jones*	unopposed		
Independent hold		Swing		

=== St Ishmaels (one seat) ===
St Ishmaels 1987
Party	Candidate	Votes	%	±%
Independent	Mrs Y.C. Evans*	535		
Independent	R.S. Owens	256		
Independent hold		Swing		

=== Scleddau (one seat) ===
Scleddau 1987
Party	Candidate	Votes	%	±%
Independent	Alwyn Cadwallader Luke*	unopposed		
Independent hold		Swing		

=== Solva (one seat) ===
Solva 1987
Party	Candidate	Votes	%	±%
Independent	John Gordon Cawood*	unopposed		
Independent hold		Swing		

=== The Havens (one seat) ===
The Havens 1987
Party	Candidate	Votes	%	±%
Independent	K.W.J. Rogers*	unopposed		
Independent hold		Swing		

=== Wiston (one seat) ===
Wiston 1987
Party	Candidate	Votes	%	±%
Independent	T.I. Rowlands*	424		
Independent	A. Vaughan	221		
Independent	Christopher Arthur Odling	108		
Independent hold		Swing		
