= 1991 Preseli Pembrokeshire District Council election =

Local election in Wales

An election to Preseli Pembrokeshire District Council was held in May 1991. The Independent councilors retained the vast majority of seats. It was preceded by the 1987 election and followed, after local government re-organization, by the 1995 Pembrokeshire County Council election. On the same day there were elections to the other district local authorities and community councils in Wales.

== Boundary changes ==
There were no boundary changes at this election.

== Ward results ==
=== Brawdy (one seat) ===
Brawdy 1991
Party	Candidate	Votes	%	±%
Independent	William Leslie Raymond*	unopposed		
Independent hold		Swing		

=== Burton (one seat) ===
No election was held as the sitting member, Jack Lewis, was unopposed; however, he died before polling day.

=== Camrose (one seat) ===
Camrose 1991
Party	Candidate	Votes	%	±%
Independent	James Desmond Edward Codd*	unopposed		
Independent hold		Swing		

=== Castle (one seat) ===
Castle 1991
Party	Candidate	Votes	%	±%
Independent	Beryl Mary Thomas-Cleaver	unopposed		
Independent hold		Swing		

=== Cilgerran (one seat) ===
Cilgerran 1991
Party	Candidate	Votes	%	±%
Independent	Mrs M.C.A. Sullivan*	515	73.3	
Labour	M.F. McNamara	188	26.7	
Independent hold		Swing		

=== Clydau (one seat) ===
Clydau 1991
Party	Candidate	Votes	%	±%
Independent	W.S. Rees*	unopposed		
Independent hold		Swing		

=== Crymych (one seat) ===
Crymych 1991
Party	Candidate	Votes	%	±%
Independent	John Lynn Davies*	unopposed		
Independent hold		Swing		

=== Dinas Cross (one seat) ===
Dinas Cross 1991
Party	Candidate	Votes	%	±%
Independent	Alun John Bringley Griffiths*'	unopposed		
Independent hold		Swing		

=== Fishguard (two seats) ===
Fishguard 1991
Party	Candidate	Votes	%	±%
Labour	Alexander Frederick Allison	unopposed		
Independent	Delwyn Davies*	unopposed		
Labour gain from Independent		Swing		
Independent hold		Swing		

=== Garth (three seats) ===
Garth 1991
Party	Candidate	Votes	%	±%
Independent	Thomas Peter Lewis*	unopposed		
Independent	Peter Alan Stock*	unopposed		
Independent	Donald Richard Twigg	unopposed		
Independent hold		Swing		
Independent hold		Swing		
Independent hold		Swing		

=== Goodwick (one seat) ===
Goodwick 1991
Party	Candidate	Votes	%	±%
Independent	William Lloyd Evans*	unopposed		
Independent hold		Swing		

=== Hakin (three seats) ===
Hakin 1991
Party	Candidate	Votes	%	±%
Independent	Eric Ronald Harries*	1,414		
Independent	Arthur George Edwards	794		
Independent	Basil Ralph Woodruff*	774		
Labour	Alun Emanuel Byrne*	767		
Independent	J. Lee	694		
Independent	G.N.W. Max	688		
Independent	E. Russell	682		
Independent				
Independent hold		Swing		
Independent gain from Labour		Swing		
Independent hold		Swing		

=== Haverfordwest Prendergast (one seat) ===
Haverfordwest Prendergast 1991
Party	Candidate	Votes	%	±%
Independent	J.G. Nicholas	358		
Independent	M. Davies	346		
Independent hold		Swing		

=== Haverfordwest Priory (one seat) ===
Haverfordwest Priory 1991
Party	Candidate	Votes	%	±%
Independent	B.S. Hearne*	unopposed		
Independent hold		Swing		

=== Johnston (one seat) ===
Johnston 1991
Party	Candidate	Votes	%	±%
Independent	George Charles Grey*	490		
Independent	B. Green	203		
Independent hold		Swing		

=== Letterston (one seat) ===
Letterston 1991
Party	Candidate	Votes	%	±%
Independent	Frank L. Sandall*	591		
Liberal Democrats	Michael Ian Warden	212		
Independent hold		Swing		

=== Llangwm (one seat) ===
Llangwm 1991
Party	Candidate	Votes	%	±%
Independent	William Henry Hitchings*	652		
Independent	G.R. Stone	110		
Independent hold		Swing		

=== Maenclochog (one seat) ===
Maenclochog 1991
Party	Candidate	Votes	%	±%
Independent	Mrs N.B. Drew*	unopposed		
Independent hold		Swing		

=== Merlin's Bridge (one seat) ===
Affie Webb lost his seat after the drawing of lots.

Merlin's Bridge 1991
Party	Candidate	Votes	%	±%
Independent	Cyril George Maurice Hughes	399		
Independent	A.J. Webb*	399		
Independent hold		Swing		

=== Milford Haven, Central and East (three seats) ===
Milford Haven, Central and East 1991
Party	Candidate	Votes	%	±%
Liberal Democrats	Thomas Hutton Sinclair*	942		
Conservative	Stanley Thomas Hudson*	638		
Labour	W.J. Morgan	522		
Independent	W.J. Owston	514		
Independent	W.J.K. Williams	499		
Independent	K. Watkins	471		
Independent	Irwin Edwards	273		
Liberal Democrats hold		Swing		
Conservative hold		Swing		
Labour gain from Independent		Swing		

=== Milford Haven, North and West (two seats) ===
An Independent had gained a seat from the Liberal Democrats at a by-election.

Milford Haven, North and West 1991
Party	Candidate	Votes	%	±%
Independent	Mike Stoddart	838		
Independent	Edward George Setterfield*	655		
Independent	Mrs T.E. Howlin	514		
Independent	David John Adams	508		
Independent	M. Williams	263		
Independent hold		Swing		
Independent hold		Swing		

=== Newport (one seat) ===
Newport 1991
Party	Candidate	Votes	%	±%
Independent	Elwyn George John	299		
Independent	A.G. Rees	255		
Majority				
Independent hold		Swing		

=== Neyland East (one seat) ===
Neyland East 1991
Party	Candidate	Votes	%	±%
Labour	P.J. Murphy	unopposed		
Labour gain from Independent		Swing		

=== Neyland West (one seat) ===
Neyland West 1991
Party	Candidate	Votes	%	±%
Independent	Patricia Ann Gilbert	304		
Independent	J.L.Garrett*	287		
Independent hold		Swing		

=== Rudbaxton (one seat) ===
Rudbaxton 1991
Party	Candidate	Votes	%	±%
Independent	David Edwin Pritchard*	unopposed		
Independent hold		Swing		

=== St David's (one seat) ===
St David's 1991
Party	Candidate	Votes	%	±%
Independent	J.J. Richards	555		
Independent	D. Phillips	471		
Independent hold		Swing		

=== St Dogmaels (one seat) ===
No election was held as no nominations were submitted.

=== St Ishmaels (one seat) ===
St Ishmaels 1991
Party	Candidate	Votes	%	±%
Independent	Mrs Y.C. Evans*	unopposed		
Independent hold		Swing		

=== Scleddau (one seat) ===
Scleddau 1991
Party	Candidate	Votes	%	±%
Independent	Alwyn Cadwallader Luke*	388		
Liberal Democrats	R.J. Grosvenor	125		
Independent hold		Swing		

=== Solva (one seat) ===
Solva 1991
Party	Candidate	Votes	%	±%
Independent	John Gordon Cawood*	775		
Independent	W.W. Bartlett	84		
Independent hold		Swing		

=== The Havens (one seat) ===
The Havens 1991
Party	Candidate	Votes	%	±%
Independent	K.W.J. Rogers*	unopposed		
Independent hold		Swing		

=== Wiston (one seat) ===
Wiston 1991
Party	Candidate	Votes	%	±%
Independent	Peter Edmund Masterson	319		
Independent	P.E. Lewis	284		
Independent	A. Vaughan	170		
Independent hold		Swing		

== By-elections 1991-1995 ==
=== Burton by-election 1991 ===
A by-election was held in the Burton ward following the death of the sitting member shortly before the 1991 election.

Burton by-election 1991
Party	Candidate	Votes	%	±%
Independent	Lewis James Lloyd	347	75.8	
Independent	N. Hardacre	71	15.5	
Independent	J. Stone	40	8.7	
Independent hold		Swing		

=== St Dogmaels by-election 1991 ===
A by-election was held in the St Dogmaels ward after no nominations were received for the regular election.

St Dogmaels by-election 1991
Party	Candidate	Votes	%	±%
Independent	Rev Emyr Huw Jones	unopposed		
Independent hold		Swing		
