= 1983 Carmarthen District Council election =

Welsh local election

Elections to Carmarthen District Council were held in May 1983. It was preceded by the 1979 election and followed by the 1987 election. On the same day there were elections to the other district local authorities and community councils in Wales.

== Results ==
=== Abergwili and Llanllawddog (one seat) ===
Abergwili and Llanllawddog 1983
Party	Candidate	Votes	%	±%
Independent	Samuel Scurlock Bowen*	482		
Alliance (SDP)	Pamela Ann Palmer	393		
Majority		89		
Independent hold		Swing		

=== Abernant (one seat) ===
Abernant 1983
Party	Candidate	Votes	%	±%
Independent	William David Thomas*	Unopposed		
Independent hold				

=== Carmarthen Town Ward One (four seats) ===
Carmarthen Town Ward One 1983
Party	Candidate	Votes	%	±%
Independent	David Howell Merriman*	1,276		
Labour	John Russell Davies*	985		
Labour	John Elfed Williams	797		
Labour	T.H. Gwynne Davies*	789		
Independent	Dewi Evans*	746		
Labour	Kenneth Bryan Maynard	729		
Independent	Gwynne Morris Williams	671		
Independent hold		Swing		
Labour hold		Swing		
Labour gain from Independent		Swing		
Labour hold		Swing		

=== Carmarthen Town Ward Two (two seats) ===
Carmarthen Town Ward Two 1983
Party	Candidate	Votes	%	±%
Independent	John Elvet Thomas*	654		
Independent	Thomas Llewellyn Davies*	514		
Independent	June Williams	457		
Labour	Peter Short	353		
Independent hold		Swing		
Independent hold		Swing		

=== Carmarthen Town Ward Three (three seats) ===
Carmarthen Town Ward Three 1983
Party	Candidate	Votes	%	±%
Alliance (Liberal)	David Nam*	1,322		
Independent	David Percy Jones*	983		
Independent	Helen Margaret Thomas	899		
Independent	P. Hurley	428		
Labour	Richard John Williams	422		
Alliance hold		Swing		
Independent hold		Swing		
Independent hold		Swing		

=== Cilymaenllwyd (one seat) ===
Cilymaenllwyd 1983
Party	Candidate	Votes	%	±%
Independent	Daniel Clodwyn Thomas*	645		
Plaid Cymru	D.J. Gwynne	105		
Majority		540		
Independent hold		Swing		

=== Cynwyl Elfed and Llanpumsaint (one seat) ===
Cynwyl Elfed and Llanpumsaint 1983
Party	Candidate	Votes	%	±%
Independent	David Jones*	446		
Independent	Lyn Luke ap Trin Davies	399		
Majority		47		
Independent hold		Swing		

=== Henllanfallteg (one seat) ===
Henllanfallteg 1983
Party	Candidate	Votes	%	±%
Independent	John Gibbin*	Unopposed		
Independent hold				

=== Laugharne Township (two seats) ===
Laugharne Township 1983
Party	Candidate	Votes	%	±%
Independent	Frank Elwyn John*	Unopposed		
Independent	Cyril William Roberts*	Unopposed		
Independent hold				
Independent hold				

=== Llanarthney and Llanddarog (three seats) ===
Llanarthney and Llanddarog 1983
Party	Candidate	Votes	%	±%
Ratepayers	Huw Voyle Williams*	2,048		
Ratepayers	Dewi Wyn Edwards*	1,784		
Labour	Thomas Henry Richards*	1,472		
Ratepayers	Peter Edward Rees	1,043		
Ratepayers hold		Swing		
Ratepayers hold		Swing		
Labour hold		Swing		

=== Llandyfaelog (two seats) ===
Llandyfaelog 1983
Party	Candidate	Votes	%	±%
Independent	Sidney Daniel John*	1,050		
Independent	David Charles Phillips*	1,005		
Plaid Cymru	Malcolm W.E. Rees	337		
Independent hold		Swing		
Independent hold		Swing		

=== Llangeler (two seats) ===
Llangeler 1983
Party	Candidate	Votes	%	±%
Independent	Thomas Wilfred Davies*	1,168		
Independent	Thomas Keith Davies	557		
Independent	W. Ainsleigh Verdun Harris	549		
Independent	William Michael Davies	548		
Independent hold		Swing		
Independent gain from Plaid Cymru		Swing		

=== Llanfihangel-ar-Arth (one seat) ===
Llanfihangel-ar-Arth 1983
Party	Candidate	Votes	%	±%
Independent	David John Lewis*	539		
Independent	David George Lewis	428		
Majority		111		
Independent hold		Swing		

=== Llanfihangel Rhos-y-Corn (one seat) ===
Llanfihangel Rhos-y-Corn 1983
Party	Candidate	Votes	%	±%
Independent	Evan Eirwyn Jones*	375		
Independent	K.D. Rees	79		
Majority		296		
Independent hold		Swing		

=== Llangain (one seat) ===
Llangain 1983
Party	Candidate	Votes	%	±%
Independent	Griffith Trevor Rees*	Unopposed		
Independent hold				

=== Newchurch (two seats) ===
Newchurch 1983
Party	Candidate	Votes	%	±%
Independent	Hywel Lloyd Williams*	823		
Independent	John David James Morgan	742		
Independent	Evan James Thomas*	737		
Independent	G. Walsh	536		
Independent	John B. Lewis	186		
Independent hold		Swing		
Independent hold		Swing		

=== Llangyndeyrn (two seats) ===
Llangyndeyrn 1983
Party	Candidate	Votes	%	±%
Labour	William D. Evans*	1,029		
Labour	Ivor Haydn Edmunds	727		
Plaid Cymru	E.J. Lewis	550		
Independent	Robert Michael Beynon	386		
Labour hold		Swing		
Labour gain from Plaid Cymru		Swing		

=== Llanllwni (two seats) ===
Llanllwni 1983
Party	Candidate	Votes	%	±%
Independent	John Emrys Oriel Jones*	Unopposed		
Independent	Oliver Williams*	Unopposed		
Independent hold				
Independent hold				

=== Newcastle Emlyn (one seat) ===
Newcastle Emlyn 1983
Party	Candidate	Votes	%	±%
Independent	G. Davies*	Unopposed		
Independent hold				

=== St Clears (two seats) ===
St Clears 1983
Party	Candidate	Votes	%	±%
Independent	Victor Lawrence James*	1,301		
Independent	Benjamin Delwyn Royden Thomas*	1,107		
Independent	E.T. Pope	161		
Independent hold		Swing		
Independent hold		Swing		

=== Whitland (one seat) ===
Whitland 1983
Party	Candidate	Votes	%	±%
Alliance (SDP)	A.P. Vedeniapin	559		
Plaid Cymru	Ithel Parri-Roberts	321		
Majority		238		
Alliance gain from Independent		Swing		
