= 1976 Preseli District Council election =

Local election in Wales

An election to Preseli District Council was held in May 1976. It was preceded by the 1973 election and followed by the 1979 election. On the same day there were elections to the other district local authorities and community councils in Wales.

== Results ==
=== Ambleston (one seat) ===
Ambleston 1976
Party	Candidate	Votes	%	±%
Independent	Frank L. Sandall*	Unopposed		
Independent hold		Swing		

=== Burton (one seat) ===
Burton 1976
Party	Candidate	Votes	%	±%
Independent	J.R. Lewis	390		
Independent	W.R. Jenkins	294		
Majority				
Independent hold		Swing		

=== Boulston (one seat) ===
Boulston 1983
Party	Candidate	Votes	%	±%
Independent	C. Cook	unopposed		
Independent hold		Swing		

=== Camrose (one seat) ===
Camrose 1976
Party	Candidate	Votes	%	±%
Independent	G. Absalom*	Unopposed		
Independent hold		Swing		

=== Clydey and Llanfyrnach (one seat) ===
Clydey and Llanfyrnach 1976
Party	Candidate	Votes	%	±%
Independent	W.S. Rees*	Unopposed		
Independent hold		Swing		

=== Eglwyswrw (one seat) ===
Eglwyswrw 1976
Party	Candidate	Votes	%	±%
Independent	Edward Glyndwr Vaughan*	Unopposed		
Independent hold		Swing		

=== Fishguard (three seats) ===
Fishguard 1976
Party	Candidate	Votes	%	±%
Independent	Dilys Davies Evans*	1,125		
Independent	M.P. Sparkes*	951		
Independent	D. James*	534		
Independent	E. Evans	490		
Independent	F. Thomas	221		
Independent hold		Swing		
Independent hold		Swing		
Independent hold		Swing		

=== Freystrop and Llangwm (one seat) ===
Freystrop and Llangwm 1976
Party	Candidate	Votes	%	±%
Independent	J. Evans*	629		
Independent	W. Brockway	179		
Independent	W. Adams	61		
Majority				
Independent hold		Swing		

=== Goodwick (one seat) ===
Goodwick 1976
Party	Candidate	Votes	%	±%
Independent	William Lloyd Evans*	Unopposed		
Independent hold		Swing		

=== Haverfordwest Ward One (three seats) ===
Haverfordwest Ward One 1976
Party	Candidate	Votes	%	±%
Independent	Mrs C.M. Cole*	909		
Independent	D. Haydn	830		
Independent	G. Jones*	603		
Labour	R. Davies	376		
Independent	R. Davies	251		
Independent	A. Kersey	205		
Independent hold		Swing		
Independent hold		Swing		
Independent hold		Swing		

=== Haverfordwest Ward Two (three seats) ===
Haverfordwest Ward Two 1976
Party	Candidate	Votes	%	±%
Independent	T. Arran*	739		
Independent	W.E.L. Jenkins	714		
Independent	G. Green*	527		
Labour	T. Kersey	336		
Independent hold		Swing		
Independent hold		Swing		
Independent hold		Swing		

=== Henry's Moat (one seat) ===
Henry's Moat 1976
Party	Candidate	Votes	%	±%
Independent	B. Griffiths*	Unopposed		
Independent hold		Swing		

=== Johnston (one seat) ===
Johnston 1976
Party	Candidate	Votes	%	±%
Independent	George Charles Grey	314		
Independent	R.J.C. Tibbs	269		
Majority				
Independent hold		Swing		

=== Kilgerran and Manordeifi (one seat) ===
Kilgerran and Manordeifi 1983
Party	Candidate	Votes	%	±%
Independent	J.M. Davies*	unopposed		
Independent hold		Swing		

=== Llanwnda (one seat) ===
Llanwnda 1976
Party	Candidate	Votes	%	±%
Independent	Alwyn Cadwallader Luke	Unopposed		
Independent hold		Swing		

=== Maenclochog (one seat) ===
Maenclochog 1983
Party	Candidate	Votes	%	±%
Independent	Mrs N. Drew*	unopposed		
Independent hold		Swing		

=== Mathry (one seat) ===
Mathry 1976
Party	Candidate	Votes	%	±%
Independent	William Leslie Raymond*	Unopposed		
Independent hold		Swing		

=== Milford Haven, Central and East (three seats) ===
Milford Haven, Central and East 1976
Party	Candidate	Votes	%	±%
Independent	E. Jones*	1,097		
Independent	Stanley Thomas Hudson	720		
Independent	J. Germaine*	474		
Independent	T.W.H. Byard	462		
Independent	R. Rackley	413		
Independent hold		Swing		
Independent hold		Swing		
Independent hold		Swing		

=== Milford Haven, Hakin and Hubberston (three seats) ===
Milford Haven, Hakin and Hubberston 1976
Party	Candidate	Votes	%	±%
Independent	Mrs J. Edwards	Unopposed		
Independent	Eric Ronald Harries	Unopposed		
Independent	V. Lewis	Unopposed		
Independent hold		Swing		
Independent hold		Swing		
Independent hold		Swing		

=== Milford Haven, North and West (three seats) ===
Milford Haven, North and West 1976
Party	Candidate	Votes	%	±%
Independent	F.D.G. Jones	Unopposed		
Independent	S. Jones*	Unopposed		
Independent	Barrie Thomas Woolmer*	Unopposed		
Independent hold		Swing		
Independent hold		Swing		
Independent hold		Swing		

=== Nevern (one seat) ===
Nevern 1983
Party	Candidate	Votes	%	±%
Independent	E.G. Vaughan	unopposed		
Independent hold		Swing		

=== Newport (one seat) ===
Newport 1983
Party	Candidate	Votes	%	±%
Independent	C. Davies	407		
Independent	A.G. Rees	325		
Independent	S.H.H. Davies	199		
Majority				
Independent hold		Swing		

=== Neyland (two seats) ===
Neyland 1976
Party	Candidate	Votes	%	±%
Independent	J. John	597		
Labour	K. Walters	571		
Independent	E. Pugh	233		
Independent hold		Swing		
Labour gain from Independent		Swing		

=== St David's (one seat) ===
St David's 1976
Party	Candidate	Votes	%	±%
Independent	D. Morgan*	Unopposed		
Independent hold		Swing		

=== St Dogmaels (one seat) ===
St Dogmaels 1983
Party	Candidate	Votes	%	±%
Independent	Halket Jones*	unopposed		
Independent hold		Swing		

=== St Ishmaels (one seat) ===
St Ishmaels 1983
Party	Candidate	Votes	%	±%
Independent	Mrs Y.C. Evans	unopposed		
Independent hold		Swing		

=== St Thomas and Haroldson St Issels (one seat) ===
St Thomas and Haroldson St Issels 1976
Party	Candidate	Votes	%	±%
Independent	A.J. Webb*	Unopposed		
Independent hold		Swing		

=== Steynton (one seat) ===
Steynton 1983
Party	Candidate	Votes	%	±%
Independent	J.W.H. Jarman	unopposed		
Independent hold		Swing		

=== Walwyns Castle (one seat) ===
Walwyns Castle 1983
Party	Candidate	Votes	%	±%
Independent	K.W.J. Rogers	unopposed		
Independent hold		Swing		

=== Whitchurch (one seat) ===
Whitchurch 1976
Party	Candidate	Votes	%	±%
Independent	John Gordon Cawood*	Unopposed		
Independent hold		Swing		

=== Wiston (one seat) ===
Wiston 1976
Party	Candidate	Votes	%	±%
Independent	W. Evans*	Unopposed		
Independent hold		Swing		
