= 1976 Carmarthen District Council election =

Welsh local election

An election to Carmarthen District Council was held in May 1976. It was preceded by the 1973 election and followed by the 1979 election. On the same day there were elections to the other District local authorities and community councils in Wales.

The overwhelming majority of seats were held by Independent candidates. Several Labour candidates were returned but all five Plaid Cymru candidates were defeated. The vice chairman of the authority, Glyn Howell, was defeated by another Independent at Newcastle Emlyn.

== Results ==
=== Abergwili and Llanllawddog (one seat) ===
Abergwili and Llanllawddog 1976
Party	Candidate	Votes	%	±%
Independent	Samuel Scurlock Bowen*	Unopposed		
Independent hold		Swing		

=== Abernant (one seat) ===
Abernant 1976
Party	Candidate	Votes	%	±%
Independent	William David Thomas*	640	70.0	
Independent	Dewi Carwyn Phillips	195	21.3	
Independent	William Harcour Griffiths	79	8.6	
Majority			48.7	
Turnout			82.4	
Independent hold		Swing		

=== Carmarthen Town Ward One (four seats) ===
Carmarthen Town Ward One 1976
Party	Candidate	Votes	%	±%
Independent	H. Dewi Evans	899		
Independent	David Howell Merriman	888		
Labour	T.H. Gwynne Davies	847		
Labour	Cliff Dean*	811		
Labour	Kenneth Bryan Maynard	769		
Labour	William Job Rogers*	736		
Plaid Cymru	John Gareth Matthews	704		
Turnout				
Independent hold		Swing		
Independent gain from Labour		Swing		
Labour hold		Swing		
Labour hold		Swing		

=== Carmarthen Town Ward Two (two seats) ===
Carmarthen Town Ward Two 1976
Party	Candidate	Votes	%	±%
Independent	Thomas Llewellyn Davies*	684		
Independent	Ronald Byles Evans*	538		
Independent	John Michael Jones	408		
Turnout				
Independent hold		Swing		
Independent hold		Swing		

=== Carmarthen Town Ward Three (three seats) ===
Carmarthen Town Ward Three 1976
Party	Candidate	Votes	%	±%
Liberal	David Nam	904		
Independent	Thomas James Hurley*	768		
Independent	Emrys Rees*	702		
Plaid Cymru	Gwilym James	641		
Independent	David Aneurin Waters*	543		
Liberal	Arthur Jones	513		
Turnout				
Liberal gain from Independent		Swing		
Independent hold		Swing		
Independent hold		Swing		

=== Cilymaenllwyd (one seat) ===
Cilymaenllwyd 1976
Party	Candidate	Votes	%	±%
Independent	Daniel Clodwyn Thomas*	Unopposed		
Independent hold		Swing		

=== Cynwyl Elfed and Llanpumsaint (one seat) ===
Cynwyl Elfed and Llanpumsaint 1976
Party	Candidate	Votes	%	±%
Independent	David Jones*	Unopposed		
Independent hold		Swing		

=== Henllanfallteg (one seat) ===
Henllanfallteg 1976
Party	Candidate	Votes	%	±%
Independent	John Gibbin*	Unopposed		
Independent hold		Swing		

=== Laugharne Township (two seats) ===
Laugharne Township 1976
Party	Candidate	Votes	%	±%
Independent	Frank Elwyn John*	946		
Independent	John Rees*	712		
Independent	G. Machin	264		
Turnout				
Independent hold		Swing		
Independent hold		Swing		

=== Llanarthney and Llanddarog (three seats) ===
Llanarthney and Llanddarog 1976
Party	Candidate	Votes	%	±%
Independent	Huw Voyle Williams*	1,605		
Labour	Thomas Henry Richards*	1,300		
Labour	Evan Rhys Griffiths	1,196		
Labour	Percy W. Lewis*	1,061		
Independent	Jane Ann Jones	1,044		
Independent	William Rees	708		
Turnout				
Independent hold		Swing		
Labour hold		Swing		
Labour hold		Swing		

=== Llandyfaelog (two seats) ===
Llandyfaelog 1976
Party	Candidate	Votes	%	±%
Independent	Derrick William H. Stephens*	817		
Independent	Sidney Daniel John	804		
Plaid Cymru	William R. Rees	704		
Turnout				
Independent hold		Swing		
Independent hold		Swing		

=== Llangeler (two seats) ===
Llangeler 1976
Party	Candidate	Votes	%	±%
Independent	Thomas Wilfred Davies*	880		
Independent	Margaret Brynmor Williams*	833		
Plaid Cymru	David Howell Jones	678		
Independent	J. Griffiths	344		
Turnout				
Independent hold		Swing		
Independent hold		Swing		

=== Llanfihangel-ar-Arth (one seat) ===
Llanfihangel-ar-Arth 1976
Party	Candidate	Votes	%	±%
Independent	David John Lewis*	666		
Independent	D.R. Jonathon	465		
Majority			17.8	
Turnout			80.7	
Independent hold		Swing		

=== Llanfihangel Rhos-y-Corn (one seat) ===
Llanfihangel Rhos-y-Corn 1976
Party	Candidate	Votes	%	±%
Independent	Evan Eirwyn Jones*	269	55.9	
Independent	David R.M. Daniels	212	44.1	
Majority			11.9	
Turnout			76.5	
Independent hold		Swing		

=== Llangain (one seat) ===
Llangain 1976
Party	Candidate	Votes	%	±%
Independent	Griffith Trevor Rees*	Unopposed		
Independent hold		Swing		

=== Llangynnwr (two seats) ===
Llangynnwr 1976
Party	Candidate	Votes	%	±%
Independent	David Percy Jones*	1,066		
Independent	Evan James Thomas*	900		
Plaid Cymru	Hywel Lloyd Williams	547		
Turnout				
Independent hold		Swing		
Independent hold		Swing		

=== Llangyndeyrn (two seats) ===
Llangyndeyrn 1976
Party	Candidate	Votes	%	±%
Labour	Harold Albert Williams*	918		
Labour	William D. Evans*	906		
Independent	Dynfor Vaughan Owens	424		
Turnout				
Labour hold		Swing		
Labour hold		Swing		

=== Llanllwni (two seats) ===
Llanllwni 1976
Party	Candidate	Votes	%	±%
Independent	John Emrys Oriel Jones*	1,216		
Independent	Oliver Williams	856		
Independent	Evan Llewellyn Evans	540		
Turnout				
Independent hold		Swing		
Independent hold		Swing		

=== Newcastle Emlyn (one seat) ===
Newcastle Emlyn 1976
Party	Candidate	Votes	%	±%
Independent	Glanville Davies	568	51.5	
Independent	Glyn E. Howell*	535	48.5	
Majority		33	3.0	
Turnout			84.9	
Independent hold		Swing		

=== St Clears (two seats) ===
St Clears 1976
Party	Candidate	Votes	%	±%
Independent	Victor Lawrence James	Unopposed		
Independent	Benjamin Delwyn Royden Thomas*	Unopposed		
Turnout				
Independent hold		Swing		
Independent hold		Swing		

=== Whitland (one seat) ===
Whitland 1976
Party	Candidate	Votes	%	±%
Independent	Idris Powell James*	Unopposed		
Independent hold		Swing		
