= 1973 Carmarthen District Council election =

Welsh local election

The first election to Carmarthen District Council following the re-organisation of local government in Wales was held in May 1973. It was followed by the 1976 election. On the same day there were elections to the other District local authorities and community councils in Wales.

== Results ==
=== Abergwili and Llanllawddog (one seat) ===
Abergwili and Llanllawddog 1973
Party	Candidate	Votes	%	±%
Independent	Samuel Scurlock Bowen	436	44.8	
Independent	J. Harries	372	38.2	
Independent	R. Davies	165	17.0	
Majority			6.6	
Turnout			82.8	
Independent win (new seat)				

=== Abernant (one seat) ===
Abernant 1973
Party	Candidate	Votes	%	±%
Independent	William David Thomas	Unopposed		
Independent win (new seat)				

=== Carmarthen Town Ward One (four seats) ===
Carmarthen Town Ward One 1973
Party	Candidate	Votes	%	±%
Labour	L.V. Rice	1,248		
Labour	Cliff Dean	993		
Independent	J. Davies	991		
Labour	W. Rogers	932		
Independent	H. Dewi Evans	794		
Labour	G.B. Evans	782		
Independent	R. Morgan	756		
Plaid Cymru	Peter Hughes Griffiths	720		
Turnout				
Labour win (new seat)				
Labour win (new seat)				
Independent win (new seat)				
Labour win (new seat)				

=== Carmarthen Town Ward Two (two seats) ===
Carmarthen Town Ward Two 1973
Party	Candidate	Votes	%	±%
Independent	Thomas Llewellyn Davies	579		
Independent	R. Evans	461		
Independent	J. Jones	372		
Ratepayer	T. Preece	364		
Turnout				
Independent win (new seat)				
Independent win (new seat)				

=== Carmarthen Town Ward Three (three seats) ===
Carmarthen Town Ward Three 1973
Party	Candidate	Votes	%	±%
Independent	Thomas James Hurley	859		
Independent	Emrys Rees	796		
Independent	D. Waters	774		
Labour	Anthony Earle	615		
Independent	G. Williams	606		
Labour	E. Richards	434		
Turnout				
Independent win (new seat)				
Independent win (new seat)				
Independent win (new seat)				

=== Cilymaenllwyd (one seat) ===
Cilymaenllwyd 1973
Party	Candidate	Votes	%	±%
Independent	Daniel Clodwyn Thomas	Unopposed		
Independent win (new seat)				

=== Cynwyl Elfed and Llanpumsaint (one seat) ===
Cynwyl Elfed and Llanpumsaint 1973
Party	Candidate	Votes	%	±%
Independent	David Jones	454	45.0	
Independent	H. Bowen	430	42.6	
Independent	John Russell Davies	126	12.5	
Majority		24	2.4	
Turnout			85.6	
Independent win (new seat)				

=== Henllanfallteg (one seat) ===
Henllanfallteg 1973
Party	Candidate	Votes	%	±%
Independent	John Gibbin*	405	51.5	
Independent	D. Jones	381	48.5	
Majority		24	3.1	
Turnout				
Independent win (new seat)				

=== Laugharne Township (two seats) ===
Laugharne Township 1973
Party	Candidate	Votes	%	±%
Independent	Frank Elwyn John	Unopposed		
Independent	J. Rees	Unopposed		
Independent win (new seat)				
Independent win (new seat)				

=== Llanarthney and Llanddarog (three seats) ===
Llanarthney and Llanddarog 1973
Party	Candidate	Votes	%	±%
Independent	Huw Voyle Williams	1,463		
Labour	Percy W. Lewis	1,400		
Labour	Thomas Henry Richards	1,292		
Labour	E. Griffiths	1,223		
Independent	B. Edwards	1,094		
Independent Labour	O. Thomas	892		
Turnout				
Independent win (new seat)				
Labour win (new seat)				
Labour win (new seat)				

=== Llandyfaelog (two seats) ===
Llandyfaelog 1973
Party	Candidate	Votes	%	±%
Independent	D. Stephens	838		
Independent	J. Evans	599		
Independent	I. Rees	517		
Plaid Cymru	M. Evans	414		
Turnout				
Independent win (new seat)				
Independent win (new seat)				

=== Llangeler (two seats) ===
Llangeler 1973
Party	Candidate	Votes	%	±%
Independent	Margaret Brynmor Williams	875		
Independent	Thomas Wilfred Davies	734		
Independent	A. Jones	496		
Independent	D. Lloyd	288		
Independent	J. Griffiths	282		
Independent	D. Jones	247		
Turnout				
Independent win (new seat)				
Independent win (new seat)				

=== Llanfihangel-ar-Arth (one seat) ===
Llanfihangel-ar-Arth 1973
Party	Candidate	Votes	%	±%
Independent	David John Lewis	Unopposed		
Independent win (new seat)				

=== Llanfihangel Rhos-y-Corn (one seat) ===
Llanfihangel Rhos-y-Corn 1973
Party	Candidate	Votes	%	±%
Independent	Evan Eirwyn Jones	220	46.1	
Independent	D. Daniels	145	30.4	
Independent	K. James	112	23.5	
Majority			15.7	
Turnout			76.5	
Independent win (new seat)				

=== Llangain (one seat) ===
Llangain 1973
Party	Candidate	Votes	%	±%
Independent	Griffith Trevor Rees	765	72.4	
Independent	I. Williams	291	27.6	
Majority			44.9	
Turnout			82.8	
Independent win (new seat)				

=== Llangynnwr (two seats) ===
Llangynnwr 1973
Party	Candidate	Votes	%	±%
Independent	David Percy Jones	1,090		
Independent	Evan James Thomas	892		
Independent	R.B.J. Gough	491		
Turnout				
Independent win (new seat)				
Independent win (new seat)				

=== Llangyndeyrn (two seats) ===
Llangyndeyrn 1973
Party	Candidate	Votes	%	±%
Labour	Harold Albert Williams	1,054		
Labour	William D. Evans	937		
Independent	W. Williams	845		
Turnout				
Labour win (new seat)				
Labour win (new seat)				

=== Llanllwni (two seats) ===
Llanllwni 1973
Party	Candidate	Votes	%	±%
Independent	John Emrys Oriel Jones	1,216		
Independent	D. Lewis	819		
Independent	J. Jones	525		
Turnout				
Independent win (new seat)				
Independent win (new seat)				

=== Newcastle Emlyn (one seat) ===
Newcastle Emlyn 1973
Party	Candidate	Votes	%	±%
Independent	Glyn E. Howell	489	43.2	
Independent	Glanville Davies	312	27.6	
Independent	A. Evans	212	18.7	
Independent	R. Owen	119	10.5	
Majority			15.6	
Turnout			87.3	
Independent win (new seat)				

=== St Clears (two seats) ===
St Clears 1973
Party	Candidate	Votes	%	±%
Independent	Benjamin Delwyn Royden Thomas	851		
Independent	O.J. Williams	816		
Independent	Victor Lawrence James	717		
Independent	W. Rees	548		
Turnout				
Independent win (new seat)				
Independent win (new seat)				

=== Whitland (one seat) ===
Whitland 1973
Party	Candidate	Votes	%	±%
Independent	I. James	Unopposed		
Independent win (new seat)				
