= Fred Bramley =

British trade unionist

Bramley, shortly before his death

Fred Bramley (27 September 1874 – 10 October 1925) was the second General Secretary of the British Trades Union Congress (TUC).

Born in Pool near Otley in the West Riding of Yorkshire, Bramley completed an apprenticeship as a cabinet-maker, then became active in the Alliance Cabinet Makers' Association and a member of the Independent Labour Party (ILP). During the 1890s, he was involved with the Clarion van movement, and also with the Bradford Trades Council.

Bramley moved to London around the turn of the century, and through his membership of the ILP, was adopted as the candidate of the "Aberdeen Labour Representation Committee" in the 1907 Aberdeen South by-election. In 1912 he became the national organiser of his union, which following a merger was known as the National Amalgamated Furnishing Trades Association. In this role, he supported workers involved in a larger number of lock-outs and strikes. He opposed British involvement in World War I, and from 1916 to 1919 he served as chairman of the London Labour Party.

In 1915, Bramley was elected to the Trades Union Congress' (TUC) Parliamentary Committee, and in 1917 he became its assistant general secretary, in which role he helped reorganize the congress, forming a new general council. He stood again for Labour in Plymouth Devonport at the 1918 and 1922 general elections.

In 1920 he was one of the joint secretaries of the National Council of Action alongside Jim Middleton and H. S. Lindsay. In 1923 became general secretary of the TUC, although he achieved little in the role due to poor health. He joined its delegation to the Soviet Union in 1924 and died, while attending an International Federation of Trade Unions meeting, in Amsterdam in 1925.

Trade union offices
Preceded by New position	Assistant General Secretary of the TUC; 1917–1923	Succeeded by Alec Firth
Preceded by C. W. Bowerman	General Secretary of the TUC; 1923–1925	Succeeded by Walter Citrine
Party political offices
Preceded by John Stokes	Chairman of the London Labour Party; 1916 – 1919	Succeeded by Thomas Naylor
Academic offices
Preceded by William Temple	President of the Workers' Educational Association; 1924 – 1926	Succeeded by Arthur Pugh
