= 1979 Preseli District Council election =

Local election in Wales

An election to Preseli District Council was held in May 1979. It was preceded by the 1976 election and followed by the 1983 election. On the same day there was a UK general election and elections to the other district local authorities and community councils in Wales.

== Results ==
=== Ambleston (one seat) ===
Ambleston 1979
Party	Candidate	Votes	%	±%
Independent	Frank L. Sandall*	741		
Independent	I.G. Williams	615		
Majority				
Independent hold		Swing		

=== Burton (one seat) ===
Burton 1979
Party	Candidate	Votes	%	±%
Independent	J.R. Lewis*	906		
Independent	G. Terry	337		
Majority				
Independent hold		Swing		

=== Boulston (one seat) ===
Boulston 1983
Party	Candidate	Votes	%	±%
Independent	C. Cook	unopposed		
Independent hold		Swing		

=== Camrose (one seat) ===
Camrose 1979
Party	Candidate	Votes	%	±%
Independent	James Desmond Edward Codd	Unopposed		
Independent hold		Swing		

=== Clydey and Llanfyrnach (one seat) ===
Clydey and Llanfyrnach 1979
Party	Candidate	Votes	%	±%
Independent	W.S. Rees*	Unopposed		
Independent hold		Swing		

=== Eglwyswrw (one seat) ===
Eglwyswrw 1979
Party	Candidate	Votes	%	±%
Independent	Edward Glyndwr Vaughan	Unopposed		
Independent hold		Swing		

=== Fishguard (three seats) ===
Fishguard 1979
Party	Candidate	Votes	%	±%
Independent	Dilys Davies Evans*	1,300		
Independent	J.P.A. Maddocks	1,281		
Independent	M.P. Sparkes*	927		
Independent	Henry Davies	737		
Labour	P. Jones	556		
Conservative	F. Llewellyn-Thomas	214		
Independent hold		Swing		
Independent hold		Swing		
Independent hold		Swing		

=== Freystrop and Llangwm (one seat) ===
Freystrop and Llangwm 1979
Party	Candidate	Votes	%	±%
Independent	J. Evans*	503		
Independent	R. Lloyd	328		
Independent	J. Hughes	294		
Majority				
Independent hold		Swing		

=== Goodwick (one seat) ===
Goodwick 1983
Party	Candidate	Votes	%	±%
Independent	William Lloyd Evans*	565		
Independent	Mrs M. Jackman	182		
Majority				
Independent hold		Swing		

=== Haverfordwest Ward One (three seats) ===
Haverfordwest Ward One 1979
Party	Candidate	Votes	%	±%
Independent	Mrs C.M. Cole*	Unopposed		
Independent	G. Jones*	Unopposed		
Independent	T. Kersey	Unopposed		
Independent hold		Swing		
Independent hold		Swing		
Independent hold		Swing		

=== Haverfordwest Ward Two (three seats) ===
Haverfordwest Ward Two 1979
Party	Candidate	Votes	%	±%
Independent	T. Arran*	Unopposed		
Independent	W.E.L. Jenkins*	Unopposed		
Independent	W.W. Ladd	Unopposed		
Independent hold		Swing		
Independent hold		Swing		
Independent hold		Swing		

=== Henry's Moat (one seat) ===
Henry's Moat 1979
Party	Candidate	Votes	%	±%
Independent	B. Griffiths*	Unopposed		
Independent hold		Swing		

=== Johnston (one seat) ===
Johnston 1979
Party	Candidate	Votes	%	±%
Independent	George Charles Grey*	Unopposed		
Majority				
Independent hold		Swing		

=== Kilgerran and Manordeifi (one seat) ===
Kilgerran and Manordeifi 1983
Party	Candidate	Votes	%	±%
Independent	J.M. Davies*	unopposed		
Independent hold		Swing		

=== Llanwnda (one seat) ===
Llanwnda 1979
Party	Candidate	Votes	%	±%
Independent	Alwyn Cadwallader Luke*	Unopposed		
Independent hold		Swing		

=== Maenclochog (one seat) ===
Maenclochog 1983
Party	Candidate	Votes	%	±%
Independent	Mrs N. Drew*	unopposed		
Independent hold		Swing		

=== Mathry (one seat) ===
Mathry 1979
Party	Candidate	Votes	%	±%
Independent	William Leslie Raymond*	Unopposed		
Independent hold		Swing		

=== Milford Haven, Central and East (three seats) ===
Milford Haven, Central and East 1979
Party	Candidate	Votes	%	±%
Independent	Stanley Thomas Hudson*	Unopposed		
Independent	W. Jones*	Unopposed		
Independent	J. Mayne	Unopposed		
Independent hold		Swing		
Independent hold		Swing		
Independent hold		Swing		

=== Milford Haven, Hakin and Hubberston (three seats) ===
Milford Haven, Hakin and Hubberston 1979
Party	Candidate	Votes	%	±%
Independent	Eric Ronald Harries*	2,512		
Independent	William John Kenneth Williams*	1,867		
Independent	D. Phillips	1,659		
Independent	Mrs J. Edwards*	1,503		
Independent hold		Swing		
Independent hold		Swing		
Independent hold		Swing		

=== Milford Haven, North and West (three seats) ===
Milford Haven, North and West 1979
Party	Candidate	Votes	%	±%
Independent	F.D.G. Jones*	Unopposed		
Independent	S. Jones*	Unopposed		
Independent	Barrie Thomas Woolmer*	Unopposed		
Independent hold		Swing		
Independent hold		Swing		
Independent hold		Swing		

=== Nevern (one seat) ===
Nevern 1983
Party	Candidate	Votes	%	±%
Independent	E.G. Vaughan	unopposed		
Independent hold		Swing		

=== Newport (one seat) ===
Newport 1983
Party	Candidate	Votes	%	±%
Independent	C. Davies	407		
Independent	A.G. Rees	325		
Independent	S.H.H. Davies	199		
Majority				
Independent hold		Swing		

=== Neyland (two seats) ===
Neyland 1979
Party	Candidate	Votes	%	±%
Independent	J. John*	Unopposed		
Independent	K. Walters*	Unopposed		
Independent hold		Swing		
Independent hold		Swing		

=== St David's (one seat) ===
St David's 1979
Party	Candidate	Votes	%	±%
Independent	D. Morgan*	721		
Independent	David Gareth Beechey Lloyd	457		
Majority				
Independent hold		Swing		

=== St Dogmaels (one seat) ===
St Dogmaels 1983
Party	Candidate	Votes	%	±%
Independent	Halket Jones*	unopposed		
Independent hold		Swing		

=== St Ishmaels (one seat) ===
St Ishmaels 1983
Party	Candidate	Votes	%	±%
Independent	Mrs Y.C. Evans	unopposed		
Independent hold		Swing		

=== St Thomas and Haroldson St Issels (one seat) ===
St Thomas and Haroldson St Issels 1979
Party	Candidate	Votes	%	±%
Independent	A.J. Webb*	638		
Independent	Cyril George Maurice Hughes	466		
Majority				
Independent hold		Swing		

=== Steynton (one seat) ===
Steynton 1983
Party	Candidate	Votes	%	±%
Independent	J.W.H. Jarman	unopposed		
Independent hold		Swing		

=== Walwyns Castle (one seat) ===
Walwyns Castle 1983
Party	Candidate	Votes	%	±%
Independent	K.W.J. Rogers	unopposed		
Independent hold		Swing		

=== Whitchurch (one seat) ===
Whitchurch 1979
Party	Candidate	Votes	%	±%
Independent	John Gordon Cawood*	Unopposed		
Independent hold		Swing		

=== Wiston (one seat) ===
Wiston 1979
Party	Candidate	Votes	%	±%
Independent	T.I. Rowlands	629		
Independent	P.E. Masterson	518		
Majority				
Independent hold		Swing		
