= 1983 Preseli District Council election =

1983 Welsh local government election

An election to Preseli District Council was held in May 1983. It was preceded by the 1979 election and followed by the 1987 election (the authority having changed its name). On the same day there were elections to the other local authorities and community councils in Wales.

== Results ==
=== Ambleston (one seat) ===
Ambleston 1983
| Party | Candidate | Votes | % | ±% |
|---|---|---|---|---|
| Independent | Frank L. Sandall* | unopposed | | |
| Independent hold | | Swing | | |

=== Burton (one seat) ===
Burton 1983
| Party | Candidate | Votes | % | ±% |
|---|---|---|---|---|
| Independent | J.R. Lewis* | 362 | | |
| Independent | W.R. Jenkins | 324 | | |
| Majority | | 38 | | |
| Independent hold | | Swing | | |

=== Boulston (one seat) ===
Boulston 1983
| Party | Candidate | Votes | % | ±% |
|---|---|---|---|---|
| Independent | C. Cook | unopposed | | |
| Independent hold | | Swing | | |

=== Camrose (one seat) ===
Camrose 1983
| Party | Candidate | Votes | % | ±% |
|---|---|---|---|---|
| Independent | James Desmond Edward Codd* | unopposed | | |
| Independent hold | | Swing | | |

=== Clydey and Llanfyrnach (one seat) ===
Clydey and Llanfyrnach 1983
| Party | Candidate | Votes | % | ±% |
|---|---|---|---|---|
| Independent | W.S. Rees* | unopposed | | |
| Independent hold | | Swing | | |

=== Eglwyswrw (one seat) ===
Eglwyswrw 1983
| Party | Candidate | Votes | % | ±% |
|---|---|---|---|---|
| Independent | S. Davies | 391 | | |
| Independent | B. Llewelyn | 181 | | |
| Majority | | 210 | | |
| Independent hold | | Swing | | |

=== Fishguard (three seats) ===
Fishguard 1983
| Party | Candidate | Votes | % | ±% |
|---|---|---|---|---|
| Independent | Henry Davies* | unopposed | | |
| Independent | Dilys Davies Evans* | unopposed | | |
| Independent | J.P.A. Maddocks* | unopposed | | |
| Independent hold | | Swing | | |
| Independent hold | | Swing | | |
| Independent hold | | Swing | | |

=== Freystrop and Llangwm (one seat) ===
Freystrop and Llangwm 1983
| Party | Candidate | Votes | % | ±% |
|---|---|---|---|---|
| Independent | William Henry Hitchings | 353 | | |
| Independent Bring Back Pembrokeshire | James Lester Brock | 282 | | |
| Independent | Cyril George Maurice Hughes | 268 | | |
| Majority | | | | |
| Independent hold | | Swing | | |

=== Goodwick(one seat) ===
Goodwick 1983
| Party | Candidate | Votes | % | ±% |
|---|---|---|---|---|
| Independent | William Lloyd Evans* | 565 | | |
| Independent | Mrs M. Jackman | 182 | | |
| Majority | | | | |
| Independent hold | | Swing | | |

=== Haverfordwest Ward One (three seats) ===
Haverfordwest Ward One 1983
| Party | Candidate | Votes | % | ±% |
|---|---|---|---|---|
| Independent Bring Back Pembrokeshire | Peter Alan Stock* | 1,208 | | |
| Independent | Thomas Peter Lewis | 694 | | |
| Independent | Mrs C.M. Cole* | 535 | | |
| Independent | A.R.R. Smith | 474 | | |
| Independent | David Edwin Pritchard | 436 | | |
| Independent Ratepayer | R.C. Morris | 430 | | |
| Independent | A.G. Bateman | 273 | | |
| SDP | A.D. Devito | 225 | | |
| Independent hold | | Swing | | |
| Independent hold | | Swing | | |
| Independent hold | | Swing | | |

=== Haverfordwest Ward Two (three seats) ===
Haverfordwest Ward Two 1983
| Party | Candidate | Votes | % | ±% |
|---|---|---|---|---|
| Independent | T.E.G. Thomas* | 684 | | |
| Independent | W.E.L. Jenkins* | 598 | | |
| Independent | W.W. Ladd* | 559 | | |
| Independent | D.J. James | 480 | | |
| Independent | K.J. Davies | 373 | | |
| Independent | V. Arnold | 205 | | |
| Independent hold | | Swing | | |
| Independent hold | | Swing | | |
| Independent hold | | Swing | | |

=== Henry's Moat (one seat) ===
Henry's Moat 1983
| Party | Candidate | Votes | % | ±% |
|---|---|---|---|---|
| Independent | B. Griffiths* | unopposed | | |
| Independent hold | | Swing | | |

=== Johnston (one seat) ===
Johnston 1983
| Party | Candidate | Votes | % | ±% |
|---|---|---|---|---|
| Independent | George Charles Grey* | 317 | | |
| Labour | J.A.D. Mackeen | 273 | | |
| Independent | R.J.C. Tibbs | 122 | | |
| Majority | | | | |
| Independent hold | | Swing | | |

=== Kilgerran and Manordeifi (one seat) ===
Kilgerran and Manordeifi 1983
| Party | Candidate | Votes | % | ±% |
|---|---|---|---|---|
| Independent | J.M. Davies* | unopposed | | |
| Independent hold | | Swing | | |

=== Llanwnda (one seat) ===
Llanwnda 1983
| Party | Candidate | Votes | % | ±% |
|---|---|---|---|---|
| Independent | Alwyn Cadwallader Luke* | 477 | | |
| Independent | M.G. Hawkins | 73 | | |
| Majority | | 404 | | |
| Independent hold | | Swing | | |

=== Maenclochog (one seat) ===
Maenclochog 1983
| Party | Candidate | Votes | % | ±% |
|---|---|---|---|---|
| Independent | Mrs N. Drew* | unopposed | | |
| Independent hold | | Swing | | |

=== Mathry (one seat) ===
Mathry 1983
| Party | Candidate | Votes | % | ±% |
|---|---|---|---|---|
| Independent | William Leslie Raymond* | unopposed | | |
| Independent hold | | Swing | | |

=== Milford Haven, Central and East (three seats) ===
Milford Haven, Central and East 1983
| Party | Candidate | Votes | % | ±% |
|---|---|---|---|---|
| Labour | S.H. Hire* | unopposed | | |
| Independent | Stanley Thomas Hudson* | unopposed | | |
| Independent | J. Mayne* | unopposed | | |
| Labour hold | | Swing | | |
| Independent hold | | Swing | | |
| Independent hold | | Swing | | |

=== Milford Haven, Hakin and Hubberston (three seats) ===
Milford Haven, Hakin and Hubberston 1983
| Party | Candidate | Votes | % | ±% |
|---|---|---|---|---|
| Independent | Eric Ronald Harries* | 1,756 | | |
| Independent | William John Kenneth Williams* | 996 | | |
| Labour | K.M. Adams | 888 | | |
| Independent | B.J. Davies | 795 | | |
| Independent | Mrs J. Edwards | 725 | | |
| Independent hold | | Swing | | |
| Independent hold | | Swing | | |
| Labour gain from Independent | | Swing | | |

=== Milford Haven, North and West (three seats) ===
Milford Haven, North and West 1983
| Party | Candidate | Votes | % | ±% |
|---|---|---|---|---|
| Independent | Barrie Thomas Woolmer* | 801 | | |
| Independent | F.D.G. Jones* | 786 | | |
| Independent | Irwin Edwards* | 685 | | |
| Labour | P.T. Kelly | 589 | | |
| Independent hold | | Swing | | |
| Independent hold | | Swing | | |
| Independent hold | | Swing | | |

=== Nevern (one seat) ===
Nevern 1983
| Party | Candidate | Votes | % | ±% |
|---|---|---|---|---|
| Independent | E.G. Vaughan | unopposed | | |
| Independent hold | | Swing | | |

=== Newport (one seat) ===
Newport 1983
| Party | Candidate | Votes | % | ±% |
|---|---|---|---|---|
| Independent | C. Davies | 407 | | |
| Independent | A.G. Rees | 325 | | |
| Independent | S.H.H. Davies | 199 | | |
| Majority | | | | |
| Independent hold | | Swing | | |

=== Neyland (two seats) ===
Neyland 1983
| Party | Candidate | Votes | % | ±% |
|---|---|---|---|---|
| Independent | D.N. Doyne* | 510 | | |
| Labour | P.J. Murphy | 496 | | |
| Independent | Mrs I.L. Charles* | 384 | | |
| Independent hold | | Swing | | |
| Labour gain from Independent | | Swing | | |

=== St David's (one seat) ===
St David's 1983
| Party | Candidate | Votes | % | ±% |
|---|---|---|---|---|
| Independent | W.J. Wilcox | unopposed | | |
| Independent hold | | Swing | | |

=== St Dogmaels (one seat) ===
St Dogmaels 1983
| Party | Candidate | Votes | % | ±% |
|---|---|---|---|---|
| Independent | Halket Jones* | unopposed | | |
| Independent hold | | Swing | | |

=== St Ishmaels (one seat) ===
St Ishmaels 1983
| Party | Candidate | Votes | % | ±% |
|---|---|---|---|---|
| Independent | Mrs Y.C. Evans | unopposed | | |
| Independent hold | | Swing | | |

=== St Thomas and Haroldson St Issels (one seat) ===
St Thomas and Haroldson St Issels 1983
| Party | Candidate | Votes | % | ±% |
|---|---|---|---|---|
| Independent | A.J. Webb* | 644 | | |
| Independent | H.W. Downes | 128 | | |
| Majority | | | | |
| Independent hold | | Swing | | |

=== Steynton (one seat) ===
Steynton 1983
| Party | Candidate | Votes | % | ±% |
|---|---|---|---|---|
| Independent | J.W.H. Jarman | unopposed | | |
| Independent hold | | Swing | | |

=== Walwyns Castle (one seat) ===
Walwyns Castle 1983
| Party | Candidate | Votes | % | ±% |
|---|---|---|---|---|
| Independent | K.W.J. Rogers | unopposed | | |
| Independent hold | | Swing | | |

=== Whitchurch (one seat) ===
Whitchurch 1983
| Party | Candidate | Votes | % | ±% |
|---|---|---|---|---|
| Independent | John Gordon Cawood* | unopposed | | |
| Independent hold | | Swing | | |

=== Wiston (one seat) ===
Wiston 1983
| Party | Candidate | Votes | % | ±% |
|---|---|---|---|---|
| Independent | T.I. Rowlands* | unopposed | | |
| Independent hold | | Swing | | |
