= 1979 Carmarthen District Council election =

Welsh local election

An election to Carmarthen District Council was held in May 1979. It was preceded by the 1976 election and followed by the 1983 election. On the same day, there was a UK General Election and elections to the other district local authorities in Wales.

There were contests in only seven of the 21 divisions with eighteen Independent councillors returned unopposed. Plaid Cymru gained three seats to gain representation on the authority for the first time.

== Results ==
=== Abergwili and Llanllawddog (one seat) ===
Abergwili and Llanllawddog 1979
Party	Candidate	Votes	%	±%
Independent	Samuel Scurlock Bowen*	Unopposed		
Independent hold		Swing		

=== Abernant (one seat) ===
Abernant 1979
Party	Candidate	Votes	%	±%
Independent	William David Thomas*	Unopposed		
Independent hold		Swing		

=== Carmarthen Town Ward One (four seats) ===
Carmarthen Town Ward One 1979
Party	Candidate	Votes	%	±%
Independent	David Howell Merriman*	1,841		
Labour	John Russell Davies	1,590		
Labour	T.H. Gwynne Davies*	1,379		
Independent	H. Dewi Evans*	1,287		
Liberal	John Brian Lewis	1,150		
Labour	Joe Palmer	1,106		
Labour	Richard John Williams	973		
Turnout				
Independent hold		Swing		
Labour hold		Swing		
Labour hold		Swing		
Independent hold		Swing		

=== Carmarthen Town Ward Two (two seats) ===
Carmarthen Town Ward Two 1979
Party	Candidate	Votes	%	±%
Independent	Thomas Llewellyn Davies*	981		
Independent	John Elvet Thomas	871		
Independent	Ronald Byles Evans*	673		
Turnout				
Independent hold		Swing		
Independent hold		Swing		

=== Carmarthen Town Ward Three (three seats) ===
Percy Jones had previously represented the Llangunnor ward.

Carmarthen Town Ward Three 1979
Party	Candidate	Votes	%	±%
Liberal	David Nam*	2,048		
Independent	David Percy Jones*	1,088		
Independent	Emrys Rees*	1,023		
Independent	Thomas James Hurley*	903		
Independent	A. Jones	743		
Turnout				
Liberal hold		Swing		
Independent hold		Swing		
Independent hold		Swing		

=== Cilymaenllwyd (one seat) ===
Cilymaenllwyd 1979
Party	Candidate	Votes	%	±%
Independent	Daniel Clodwyn Thomas*	Unopposed		
Independent hold		Swing		

=== Cynwyl Elfed and Llanpumsaint (one seat) ===
Cynwyl Elfed and Llanpumsaint 1979
Party	Candidate	Votes	%	±%
Independent	David Jones*	Unopposed		
Independent hold		Swing		

=== Henllanfallteg (one seat) ===
Henllanfallteg 1979
Party	Candidate	Votes	%	±%
Independent	John Gibbin*	Unopposed		
Independent hold		Swing		

=== Laugharne Township (two seats) ===
Laugharne Township 1979
Party	Candidate	Votes	%	±%
Independent	Frank Elwyn John*	Unopposed		
Independent	Cyril William Roberts	Unopposed		
Independent hold		Swing		
Independent hold		Swing		

=== Llanarthney and Llanddarog (three seats) ===
Llanarthney and Llanddarog 1979
Party	Candidate	Votes	%	±%
Independent	Huw Voyle Williams*	2,210		
Labour	Thomas Henry Richards*	1,592		
Labour	E. Griffiths*	1,529		
Ratepayers	J. Jones	1,399		
Labour	A. Jones	994		
Turnout				
Independent hold		Swing		
Labour hold		Swing		
Labour hold		Swing		

=== Llandyfaelog (two seats) ===
Llandyfaelog 1979
Party	Candidate	Votes	%	±%
Independent	Sidney Daniel John*	Unopposed		
Independent	David Charles Phillips	Unopposed		
Independent hold		Swing		
Independent hold		Swing		

=== Llangeler (two seats) ===
Llangeler 1979
Party	Candidate	Votes	%	±%
Independent	Thomas Wilfred Davies*	Unopposed		
Plaid Cymru	D. Howell Jones	Unopposed		
Turnout				
Independent hold		Swing		
Plaid Cymru gain from Independent		Swing		

=== Llanfihangel-ar-Arth (one seat) ===
Llanfihangel-ar-Arth 1979
Party	Candidate	Votes	%	±%
Independent	David John Lewis*	Unopposed		
Independent hold		Swing		

=== Llanfihangel Rhos-y-Corn (one seat) ===
Llanfihangel Rhos-y-Corn 1979
Party	Candidate	Votes	%	±%
Independent	Evan Eirwyn Jones*	307	57.6	
Independent	D. Daniels	226	42.4	
Majority			15.2	
Turnout			85.3	
Independent hold		Swing		

=== Llangain (one seat) ===
Llangain 1979
Party	Candidate	Votes	%	±%
Independent	Griffith Trevor Rees*	Unopposed		
Independent hold		Swing		

=== Llangynnwr (two seats) ===
Llangynnwr 1979
Party	Candidate	Votes	%	±%
Independent	Evan James Thomas*	Unopposed		
Plaid Cymru	Hywel Lloyd Williams	Unopposed		
Independent hold		Swing		
Plaid Cymru gain from Independent		Swing		

=== Llangyndeyrn (two seats) ===
Llangyndeyrn 1979
Party	Candidate	Votes	%	±%
Labour	William D. Evans*	1,186		
Plaid Cymru	Michael Thomas Evans	1,012		
Labour	David V. Jones	942		
Turnout				
Labour hold		Swing		
Plaid Cymru gain from Labour		Swing		

=== Llanllwni (two seats) ===
Llanllwni 1979
Party	Candidate	Votes	%	±%
Independent	John Emrys Oriel Jones*	Unopposed		
Independent	Oliver Williams*	Unopposed		
Independent hold		Swing		
Independent hold		Swing		

=== Newcastle Emlyn (one seat) ===
Newcastle Emlyn 1979
Party	Candidate	Votes	%	±%
Independent	G. Davies*	Unopposed		
Independent hold		Swing		

=== St Clears (two seats) ===
St Clears 1979
Party	Candidate	Votes	%	±%
Independent	Victor Lawrence James*	Unopposed		
Independent	Benjamin Delwyn Royden Thomas*	Unopposed		
Turnout				
Independent hold		Swing		
Independent hold		Swing		

=== Whitland (one seat) ===
Whitland 1979
Party	Candidate	Votes	%	±%
Independent	Idris Powell James*	804	71.6	
Independent	D. Davies	319	28.4	
Majority			43.2	
Turnout			82.7	
Independent hold		Swing		
