= Kneafsey =

Kneafsey is a surname. Notable people with the surname include:

- Honor Kneafsey (born 2004), British actress
- Tamsin Dunwoody-Kneafsey (born 1958), British politician
