= Norah Phillips, Baroness Phillips =

British Labour politician (1910–1992)

Norah Mary Phillips, Baroness Phillips, JP (née Lusher; 12 August 1910 – 14 August 1992) was an English educator, Labour Party politician, magistrate and the founder of consumer and women's groups. She was the first Roman Catholic life peeress and was the first female government whip in the House of Lords.

== Early life ==
Phillips was born on 12 August 1910 in Fulham, London, England. Her mother was a socialist and suffragette from Cumberland and her father William Lusher hailed from Norfolk and served in the Indian Army. She was educated at a convent and was raised as a Roman Catholic.

== Career and activism ==
Phillips trained as a teacher at Hampton Training College. While teaching, she became active in the local Fulham Labour Party branch. She was a long-serving London magistrate and co-founder of the National Association of Women's Clubs (1935).

She was made a life peer on 21 December 1964 as Baroness Phillips, of Fulham in the County of London. She was the first Roman Catholic life peeress and was the first female government whip in the House of Lords, as Baroness-in-Waiting from 1965 to 1970.

Phillips championed consumer issues and in 1965 founded the Housewives Trust to help shoppers obtain better value for money. In 1977, she became director of the Association for the Prevention of Theft in Shops.

Phillips served as Lord Lieutenant of Greater London from 1978 to 1985.

Phillips participated in an oral history interview in 1992, which is held in the National Life Story's: Fawcett Collection at the Women's Library, London School of Economics (LSE).

== Personal life ==
In 1930, Phillips married fellow Labour Party activist Morgan Phillips, a Welsh former miner and later the General Secretary of the Labour Party from 1944 to 1961. They had a son and a daughter, with their daughter, Gwyneth Dunwoody, becoming a long-serving Labour Member of Parliament.

Gwyneth's daughter Tamsin Dunwoody was also a politician, as a Member of the National Assembly for Wales from 2003 to 2007. She unsuccessfully stood to succeed her mother as the Labour candidate in the 2008 Crewe and Nantwich by-election.

== Death ==
Phillips died on 14 August 1992 in London, England.

Political offices
| Preceded by The Lord Beswick | Baroness-in-Waiting; 1965–1970 | Succeeded by New government |
Honorary titles
| Preceded by The Lord Elworthy | Lord Lieutenant of Greater London; 1978–1986 | Succeeded by Edwin Bramall |
