= James Middleton (political organiser) =

British political organizer (1878–1962)

James Smith Middleton (12 March 1878 – 18 November 1962) was a journalist and political organiser best known for serving as the General Secretary of the Labour Party.

== Biography ==
In 1878, Middleton was born in Clarborough, Nottinghamshire. He worked for a printer, then as a journalist on his father's labour movement journal, the Workington Star. He joined the Young People's Society of Christian Endeavour and the Independent Labour Party, then served in prominent roles on Workington Trades Council and the local Labour Representation Committee.

In 1900, while in Workington, Middleton met and married his first wife, the former Mary Muir, who was working locally as a domestic servant.

In 1902, Middleton moved to work on the Harringay Mercury, and became the first Assistant Secretary of the Labour Party. He remained in this role for many years, a close supporter of Ramsay MacDonald.

In 1911, Middleton's first wife Mary died after a lengthy battle with cancer.

Middleton opposed World War I, founding the War Emergency Workers' National Committee, and was initially enthusiastic about the October Revolution.

In 1920, Middleton was one of the joint secretaries of the National Council of Action alongside Fred Bramley and H. S. Lindsay.

In 1931, Middleton remained with the Labour Party when MacDonald left to form the National Labour Organisation, although he stated that he was in awe at MacDonald's heroism over this move.

In 1935, Middleton succeeded Arthur Henderson as General Secretary of the Labour Party. In this role, he opposed proposals to form a Popular Front and worked to sideline all critics of the official party line.

In 1936, Middleton married his second wife, the former Lucy Cox.

In 1944, having been increasingly seen as ineffective, Middleton retired as General Secretary of the Labour Party.

Starting with the 1945 general election, Middleton acted as Lucy's election agent, when she was the successful Labour candidate in Plymouth Sutton. He continued this role until her last contest in the 1955 general election.

== Legacy ==
News of Middleton's retirement brought tributes from various prominent figures in the Labour movement including George Bernard Shaw and Robert Blatchford.

In retirement, Middleton focussed on writing biographical sketches and obituaries of early Labour Party figures.

The Labour History Archive and Study Centre at the People's History Museum in Manchester has the papers of the War Emergency Workers' National Committee in their collection, as well as Middleton's General Secretary papers.

== See also ==
- Labour Party (UK)
- Lucy Middleton
- Mary Middleton

Party political offices
Preceded by Arthur Henderson	Labour Party General Secretary; 1935–1944	Succeeded by Morgan Phillips
