= Maud Ward =

Maud M. A. Ward was a British socialist activist.

The daughter of an Anglican vicar, she studied at the National Training School of Cookery and became a cook. She became interested in socialism and joined the Social Democratic Federation in Tunbridge Wells, teaching a class on Marxist economics.

Ward supported women's suffrage, joining the Adult Suffrage Society, and serving as its secretary from 1908 to 1909. She was also on the Women's Labour League committee and was a close friend of its leader, Margaret Bondfield, who shared a house with her and Ethel Clarke at one time.

In 1911, Ward gave up activism to become the Chief Woman Inspector for the National Insurance Act 1911.
