= Women's Labour League =

British women's suffrage pressure group

The Women's Labour League (WLL) was a pressure organisation, founded in London in 1906, to promote the political representation of women in parliament and local bodies. The idea was first suggested by Mary Macpherson, a linguist and journalist who had connections with the Amalgamated Society of Railway Servants, and was taken up by several notable socialist women, including Margaret MacDonald, Ada Salter, Marion Phillips and Margaret Bondfield. The League's inaugural conference was held in Leicester, with representatives of branches in London, Leicester, Preston and Hull. It was affiliated to the Labour Party. Margaret MacDonald acted as the League's president, while both Margaret Bondfield and Marion Phillips served at times as its organising secretary.

Much of the League's campaigning effort was devoted to the issue of women's suffrage. In 1913 the League decided that its membership of the Women's Social and Political Union (WSPU) was incompatible with socialism, as the WSPU itself withdrew from its origins within the Independent Labour Party and shifted to the right under Christabel Pankhurst's anti-socialist direction.

When the Representation of the People Act 1918 gave a partial women's franchise, the League decided to disband as an independent organisation. It became the women's section of the Labour Party, which had reorganised under a new constitution that year.

The Labour History Archive and Study Centre at the People's History Museum in Manchester holds the records of the Women's Labour League in their collection.

== Members of the Executive ==
The following were members of the executive of the Women's Labour League:

- Bertha Ayles
- Jennie Baker
- Miss Bell
- Miss Bellamy
- Ethel Bentham
- Margaret Bondfield
- Katharine Bruce Glasier
- Marion Curran
- Charlotte Despard
- Louise Donaldson
- Mary Gawthorpe
- Florence Harrison Bell
- Mabel Hope
- F. James
- Edith Kerrison
- Mary Longman
- Eveline Lowe
- Mary Macarthur
- Margaret MacDonald
- Miss McKenzie
- Clarice McNab
- Mary Macpherson
- Edith Macrosty
- Mary Middleton
- Mary Muir
- Minnie Nodin
- Marion Phillips
- Edith Rigby
- Ada Salter
- Grace Scholefield
- Lisbeth Simm
- Margaret Smith
- Maud Ward

== Notable members ==
- Agnes Dollan
- Annie Huggett

== See also ==
- Christian socialism
