= Morgan Phillips =

Welsh politician and trade union activist

Morgan Walter Phillips

General Secretary of the Labour Party
- In office 1944–1961
- Preceded by: James Middleton
- Succeeded by: Leonard Williams

President of the Socialist International
- In office 1951–1957
- Preceded by: Office established
- Succeeded by: Alsing Andersen

Personal details
- Born: 18 June 1902 Aberdare, Glamorgan, Wales
- Died: 15 January 1963 (aged 60) London, England
- Party: Labour
- Spouse: Norah Lusher (m. 1930)
- Children: 2 (including Gwyneth Dunwoody)
- Occupation: Colliery worker, trade union activist, party official

Morgan Walter Phillips (18 June 1902 – 15 January 1963) was a Welsh politician and trade union activist who served as General Secretary of the Labour Party from 1944 to 1961. He was instrumental in the party's electoral successes in 1945 and 1950.

Born in Aberdare and raised in Bargoed, Phillips began work as a colliery surface worker at age twelve. He became active in local Labour politics in the 1920s before moving to London to work for the party organisation. As General Secretary, he professionalised Labour Party organisation and broadened its electoral appeal. He also served as the first chairman of the Socialist International from 1948 to 1957.

In 1957, Phillips was involved in a notable libel case with Aneurin Bevan and Richard Crossman against The Spectator magazine. The case later became controversial when Richard Crossman's diaries revealed that the three had committed perjury. Phillips retired following a stroke in 1961 and died in 1963. His daughter Gwyneth Dunwoody became a Labour MP.

== Early life ==
Phillips was born on 18 June 1902 in Aberdare, Glamorgan, one of six children of William Phillips. He was brought up in Bargoed, Glamorgan. He left school at age twelve and became a colliery surface worker.

== Political career ==
At eighteen, Phillips joined the Caerphilly divisional Labour Party. He served as secretary of the Bargoed branch (1923–1925) and chairman of the Bargoed Steam Coal Lodge (1924–1926).

Phillips attended the Labour College in London, completing a two-year course in economic and social subjects. He became secretary of the Labour Party in West Fulham (1928–1930) and later in Whitechapel (1934–1937). He was a councillor on Fulham borough council (1934–1937).

== General Secretary ==
In 1937, Phillips joined Labour Party headquarters at Transport House as propaganda officer. He became secretary of the party's research department in 1941 and party secretary in 1944. The position was renamed General Secretary in 1960.

Phillips transformed Labour Party organisation by professionalising its structure and broadening its electoral appeal to middle-class voters. He was virtually the architect of the party's success in the 1945 and 1950 general elections, which resulted in six years of Labour government.

Following Labour's defeat in the 1955 general election, Harold Wilson criticised the party's organisation as resembling "a penny farthing in a jet age".

== The Spectator libel case ==
In 1957, Phillips joined Aneurin Bevan and Richard Crossman in suing The Spectator magazine for libel. The case arose from an article titled "Death in Venice" concerning the 23rd National Congress of the Italian Socialist Party. The article alleged that the three men had consumed alcohol heavily during official proceedings at the conference, stating they "puzzled the Italians by their capacity to fill themselves like tanks with whisky".

The three politicians categorically denied the allegations under oath and successfully obtained damages from the magazine. The Spectator defended the action without pleading justification. The case was notable for the plaintiffs' vehement denials and their insistence that the charges were completely untrue.

Years later, the case became a significant scandal when Richard Crossman's posthumously published diaries revealed that the magazine's allegations had been accurate. Crossman admitted that they had indeed been drinking heavily, with at least one of them "blind drunk". This revelation confirmed that the three plaintiffs had committed perjury to secure their legal victory. The case subsequently became cited as an example of the potential for abuse in British libel law.

== 1959 election and later career ==
During the 1959 election campaign, Phillips' daily press conferences were considered one of the outstanding successes despite Labour's defeat. Following the election, he presented analysis and proposals in his paper Labour in the Sixties (1960), which contributed to Labour's return to power in 1964. He also authored East meets West (1954) and various political pamphlets.

== International work and death ==
Phillips presided over conferences of the International Socialist Committee from 1944. He was elected first chairman of the Socialist International in 1948, resigning in 1957.

Phillips suffered a stroke in August 1960 and retired as General Secretary in 1961. He died on 15 January 1963 in London.

== Personal life ==
Phillips married Norah Lusher in 1930. They had two children, a son and a daughter.

Their daughter Gwyneth Dunwoody was a Labour MP from 1964 until her death in 2008. She married John Dunwoody, also a Labour MP. Their daughter Tamsin Dunwoody was a Member of the National Assembly for Wales from 2003 to 2007.

== Legacy ==
Phillips' papers are held at the People's History Museum in Manchester, The National Archives, and the Archives Hub.

Party political offices
Preceded by Arthur Greenwood	Secretary of the Research Department of the Labour Party; 1941–1944	Succeeded by Michael Young
Preceded by James Middleton	General Secretary of the Labour Party; 1944–1961	Succeeded by Leonard Williams
Transnational offices
New office	President of the Socialist International; 1951–1957	Succeeded by Alsing Andersen
