= Mabel Hope =

Mabel Besant Hope (born 1880) was an English socialist, anarchist and feminist activist, trade unionist and journalist. She wrote for the anarchist newspapers Freedom and Voice of Labour.

== Biography ==
Hope was born in 1880 in East Plumstead, Kent.

Hope became a socialist in 1897, and in 1898 began working in the telegraph department of the Post Office. She joined the Postal Telegraph Clerks' Association in 1901, and also became active in the Women's Trade Union League, moving to work for it full-time.

Hope was a supporter of the Labour Party and a founder member of the Women's Labour League. From 1906 until 1908, she served on the executive of the league, and at the 1907 Labour Party conference, she spoke in support of women's suffrage. Also in 1907, at the conference of the National Union of Women Workers she spoke on the disparity of pay between male and female telegraphists.

In 1912, Hope began writing articles for the anarchist monthly newspaper Freedom. In 1913, Hope joined the newly formed Anarchist Educational League, which had been founded by Fred Dunn, with her friend and fellow anarchist Lilian Gertrude Woolf. Other members of the League included young activists Tom Sweetlove, Elizabeth Archer and W. Fanner. Hope introduced the League members to the compositor and editor of Freedom, Tom Keell, who advised them on how to establish their weekly newspaper Voice of Labour.

During World War I, the Voice of Labour took an anti-militarist position, with Dunn, Woolf and Keell all arrested in 1916. Hope took over editorship of the newspaper, but, after a police raid of the newspapers offices in July 1916, she was forced to close it down in August 1916. When Keel was challenged by Peter Kropotkin for his anti-war views and was called "unworthy" of his editorship of Freedom, he was supported by Voice of Labour journalists, including Hope.

Hope became secretary of the London Council of Women Civil Servants in 1916, but in 1920 emigrated to the United States with Archer.
