= Mary Middleton =

Mary Middleton (née Muir; 1870 – 24 April 1911) was a Scottish political activist.

== Biography ==
Middleton was born in Carnwath in Lanarkshire to a mining overman, and the family moved around various mining villages in the area. She performed strongly at school and hoped to become a teacher, but this did not pay enough for her to contribute to her family's upkeep, so she instead became a domestic servant in Workington.

While in Workington, Mary met James Middleton, who was working at his father's paper, the Workington Star. The two soon married, and moved to London, where James found work with the Labour Representation Committee (LRC). By 1905, there had been several suggestions that the group should find a way in which non-working women could assist it and benefit from its political education. In 1906, when the LRC became the Labour Party, Middleton was a leading founder of the Women's Labour League. She served as its first secretary, working closely with the chair, Margaret MacDonald. Middleton also contributed articles to, and worked on the production of, The Woman Worker newspaper, which was the official organ of the National Federation of Women Workers.

The group developed rapidly over the next few years, but Middleton was diagnosed with cancer in 1909, and died early in 1911. MacDonald started the process of founding a baby clinic in Middleton's memory, but also died later in the year. The clinic was ultimately established as a memorial to both women.

Party political offices
Preceded by Mary Macpherson	Secretary of the Women's Labour League; 1907–1911	Succeeded by Margaret Bondfield
