= National Council of Action =

The National Council of Action was an organisation established on 5 August 1920 by the Labour movement in the United Kingdom to forestall the involvement of the British Empire in another war in 1920. Ernest Bevin had heard that the Royal Navy had dispatched ships to Helsinki and the Black Sea equipped for war. Bevin arranged a meeting with Charles Bowerman and Arthur Henderson in order to establish a Council of Action. Fred Bramley, Jim Middleton and H. S. Lindsay were appointed as joint secretaries.
