= District of Carmarthen =

Former district of Dyfed, Wales

Coordinates: 51°50′N 4°10′W

Carmarthen Welsh: Caerfyrddin
- History
  - Created: 1 April 1974
  - Abolished: 31 March 1996
  - Succeeded by: Carmarthenshire
- Status: District
  - HQ: Carmarthen

Carmarthen (Welsh: Caerfyrddin) was one of six local government districts of the county of Dyfed, west Wales, from 1974 to 1996. It was governed by the Carmarthen District Council.

== History ==
The district was formed on 1 April 1974 under the Local Government Act 1972, covering the area of four former districts from the administrative county of Carmarthenshire, which were abolished at the same time:

- Carmarthen Municipal Borough
- Carmarthen Rural District
- Newcastle Emlyn Rural District
- Newcastle Emlyn Urban District

Carmarthen district was abolished 22 years later under the Local Government (Wales) Act 1994, with the area becoming part of the new Carmarthenshire unitary authority on 1 April 1996.

== Political control ==
The first election to the council was held in 1973, initially operating as a shadow authority before coming into its powers on 1 April 1974. A majority of the seats on the council were held by independents throughout the council's existence.as follows:

Party in control	Years
Independent	1974–1996

The most significant political grouping (as distinct from the independents) was the Labour Party who held a number of seats in Carmarthen Town and the former mining wards of the Gwendraeth Valley.

== Elections ==
- Carmarthen District Council election, 1973
- Carmarthen District Council election, 1976
- Carmarthen District Council election, 1979
- Carmarthen District Council election, 1983
- Carmarthen District Council election, 1987
- Carmarthen District Council election, 1991

== Premises ==
Throughout its existence, the council was based at 3 Spilman Street in Carmarthen, which had previously been the offices of Carmarthen Rural District Council, one of its predecessor authorities.
