= Richard Edwards (Welsh politician) =

Welsh politician (born 1956)

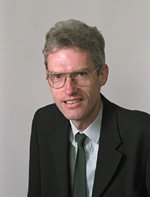
- Edwards in 2000

Member of the Welsh Assembly for Preseli Pembrokeshire
- In office 6 May 1999 – 1 May 2003
- Preceded by: New Assembly
- Succeeded by: Tamsin Dunwoody

Personal details
- Born: 25 August 1956 (age 70) Llanelli, Wales
- Party: Labour
- Education: University of Birmingham

Richard Edwards (born 25 August 1956 in Llanelli) is a former Welsh Labour politician who was a Member of the National Assembly for Wales for Preseli Pembrokeshire from 1999 to 2003. Before politics he worked in local government and was a political researcher.

== Background ==
He was educated at Queen Elizabeth Grammar School, Carmarthen, and gained a BA, MA and a PhD in philosophy from the University of Birmingham. He also attended Swansea University. He is a member of the Institute of Chartered Secretaries and Administrators and a member of the Unison trade union.

He is a cousin of the former BBC Newsreader Huw Edwards.

== Career ==
He worked as a researcher and election agent for Alan Williams MP.

=== Local Government ===
Edwards worked as an Officer at the London Borough of Hounslow from 1979 to 1981 and as a researcher and lecturer at the Institute for Local Government studies from 1981 to 1985.

He was Mayor of Carmarthen in 1997, having first been elected to Carmarthen Town Council in 1991.

=== National Assembly for Wales ===
He was elected as Member of the National Assembly for Wales for Preseli Pembrokeshire at the 1999 Welsh assembly election in a divided election, receiving just over a third of the vote. He was initially selected to chair the assembly Local Government and Environment Committee, before committees were changed in March 2000, from which point on he chaired the Environment, Planning and Transport Committee.

In November 2001, he announced his intention to stand down from the Welsh Assembly at the 2003 Welsh Assembly election, due to an illness he at the time refused to disclose. It was later revealed to have been leukemia, and that he had been suffering from it since shortly after being selected as a candidate in 1999. First Minister Rhodri Morgan described him as "[seeming] to have managed to cheat death on innumerable occasions."

He was named Assembly Politician of the Year by Channel 4 in 2002.

In 2002, Edwards called for the Welsh media to end its 'obsession' with rugby, a sport he described Wales as being 'frankly hopeless' at, saying that they should instead focus on football. He was criticised by Gareth Evans, who stated that he was "just jumping on a bandwagon" and that Wales "have had five minutes of glory in football. [Wales has] enjoyed more success in rugby over the past 100 years."

== Political views ==
=== Defense ===
==== Conflict in the Middle East ====
During his time in the assembly he was notable for his condemnation of the foreign policy of Tony Blair, condemning strikes on Afghanistan in October 2001, and subsequently criticising the Blair government's approach in the lead up to the Iraq War. He called for Blair to be arrested and charged with war crimes if the UK went to war in Iraq without a second UN resolution at Welsh Labour's 2003 conference.

==== Nuclear Disarmament ====
Edwards issued a statement of support for protests against the UK's Trident nuclear program.

=== GMOs ===
Edwards helped to lead opposition to the rollout of GMO crops in Wales, including presenting a petition against their introduction to First Minister Rhodri Morgan, alongside Pembrokeshire colleague Christine Gwyther.

=== Republicanism ===
In 2003, he was reprimanded by Presiding Officer Dafydd Elis-Thomas for describing Queen Elizabeth II as a parasite, while calling for AMs to be able to take an oath of allegiance to Wales, rather than to the Queen.

== Offices held ==
Senedd
Preceded by (new post)	Assembly Member for Preseli Pembrokeshire; 1999 – 2003	Succeeded by Tamsin Dunwoody
