= Tamsin Dunwoody =

British Labour politician (born 1958)

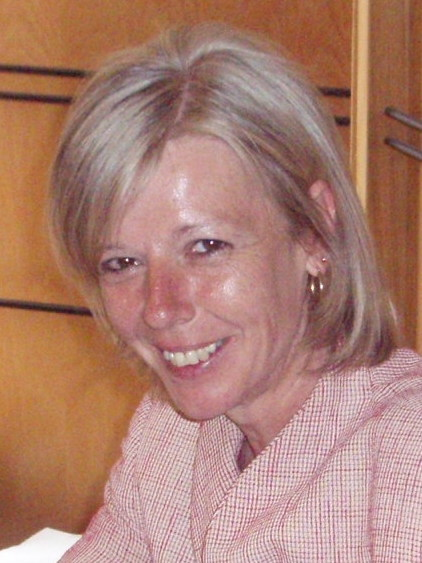

Member of the Welsh Assembly for Preseli Pembrokeshire
- In office 1 May 2003 – 3 May 2007
- Preceded by: Richard Edwards
- Succeeded by: Paul Davies

Personal details
- Born: 3 September 1958 (age 68) Totnes, England
- Party: Labour
- Children: 5
- Parent(s): John Dunwoody; Gwyneth Dunwoody
- Education: University of Kent

Moyra Tamsin Dunwoody (born 3 September 1958), sometimes known as Tamsin Dunwoody-Kneafsey, is a British Labour politician who served as the Member of the National Assembly for Wales for Preseli Pembrokeshire from 2003 to 2007. She served in the Welsh Government from 2005 to 2007 as the Deputy Minister for Environment, Planning and Countryside and Deputy Minister for Economic Development and Transport.

Dunwoody unsuccessfully stood to succeed her mother, Gwyneth Dunwoody, as the Labour candidate in the 2008 Crewe and Nantwich by-election.

== Early life ==
Dunwoody was born in Totnes, Devon, the daughter of the late Labour MPs Gwyneth Dunwoody, and Dr John Dunwoody. Both of her parents lost their parliamentary seats at the 1970 general election, although her mother went on to represent Crewe and its successor, Crewe and Nantwich for 34 years until she died. Through her mother she is the granddaughter of former Labour Party General Secretary Morgan Phillips and Norah Phillips. She was educated at the Grey Coat Hospital Church of England girls' school in Westminster and the University of Kent. She has five children.

== Professional career ==
Dunwoody trained in the National Health Service, and worked in London hospitals for nearly 15 years. She has also been an adviser to small businesses in west Wales and lived in Haverfordwest.

== Political career ==
Dunwoody-Kneafsey in 2003

Dunwoody was elected (under the name Tamsin Dunwoody-Kneafsey) as Assembly Member for Preseli Pembrokeshire from 2003 to 2007. In October 2005 she was appointed Deputy Minister for Environment, Planning and Countryside and Deputy Minister for Economic Development and Transport in the Welsh Assembly Government. She was defeated in the 2007 election by Conservative Party candidate Paul Davies.

She was selected as the Labour candidate at the Crewe and Nantwich by-election, held on 22 May 2008, which was triggered by the death of her mother. She lost to Conservative candidate Edward Timpson, by 7,860 votes marking the first Conservative Party parliamentary by-election victory in a Labour-held constituency since 1978. The last parliamentary by-election in which the Conservatives had gained a seat previously held by another party was in 1982, in Mitcham and Morden.

She unsuccessfully sought the Labour nomination for Islwyn ahead of the 2010 general election.

Senedd
Preceded by Richard Edwards	Assembly Member for Preseli Pembrokeshire; 2003–2007	Succeeded by Paul Davies
Political offices
Preceded by Brian Gibbons	Deputy Minister for Economic Development & Transport; 2005 - 2007	Succeeded by (post reorganised)
Preceded by (new post)	Deputy Minister for Environment, Planning & Countryside; 2005 - 2007	Succeeded by (post reorganised)
