= Preseli Pembrokeshire =

Former district of Dyfed, Wales

Coordinates: 51.941°N 4.961°W

Preseli Pembrokeshire Welsh: Preseli Sir Benfro
- History
  - Created: 1 April 1974
  - Abolished: 31 March 1996
  - Succeeded by: Pembrokeshire
- Status: District
  - HQ: Haverfordwest

Preseli Pembrokeshire (English: /prəˈsɛli/, prə-SEL-ee; Welsh: Preseli Sir Benfro) was one of six local government districts of Dyfed in West Wales from 1974 to 1996. Until 1987 the name of the district was Preseli. The district took its name from the Preseli Hills.

== Creation ==
The district was formed on 1 April 1974 under the Local Government Act 1972, from the following parts of the administrative county of Pembrokeshire:

- Cemaes Rural District
- Fishguard and Goodwick Urban District
- Haverfordwest Municipal Borough
- Haverfordwest Rural District
- Milford Haven Urban District
- Neyland Urban District

In 1981, a further 11 communities were transferred from South Pembrokeshire district.

== Premises ==
The council's main offices were at Cambria House on Salutation Square in Haverfordwest, which had been built in 1965 as the headquarters of one of the council's predecessors, the Haverfordwest Rural District Council.

== Abolition ==
On 1 April 1996 the district was abolished by the Local Government (Wales) Act 1994, merging with its neighbour South Pembrokeshire to become a reconstituted county of Pembrokeshire. Cambria House temporarily served as the headquarters of the new Pembrokeshire County Council. A new County Hall was built adjoining Cambria House in 1999, and Cambria House was demolished the following year.

== Political control ==
The first election to the council was held in 1973, initially operating as a shadow authority before coming into its powers on 1 April 1974. Throughout the council's existence a majority of the seats were held by independent councillors.

| Party in control | Years |
|---|---|
| Independent | 1974–1996 |

== Elections ==
- 1973 Preseli District Council election
- 1976 Preseli District Council election
- 1979 Preseli District Council election
- 1983 Preseli District Council election
- 1987 Preseli Pembrokeshire District Council election
- 1991 Preseli Pembrokeshire District Council election

== See also ==
- Preseli Hills
- Preseli Pembrokeshire (UK Parliament constituency)
- Preseli Pembrokeshire (Senedd constituency)
