= Preseli Pembrokeshire (Senedd constituency) =

Senedd constituency (1999–2026)

Coordinates: 51.941°N 4.961°W

Preseli Pembrokeshire Preseli Sir Benfro
- Former Senedd county constituency for the Senedd

- Preseli Pembrokeshire shown within the Mid and West Wales electoral region and the region shown within Wales

Former Senedd county constituency
- Created: 1999
- Abolished: 2026
- Party: Conservative
- MS: Paul Davies
- Preserved county: Dyfed

Preseli Pembrokeshire (Welsh: Preseli Sir Benfro) was a constituency of the Senedd. It elected one Member of the Senedd by the first past the post method of election. It was also one of eight constituencies in the Mid and West Wales electoral region, which elected four additional members, in addition to eight constituency members, to produce a degree of proportional representation for the region as a whole.

== Boundaries ==
Map of 2007–2026 boundaries

=== 1999 to 2007 ===
The constituency was created for the first election to the Assembly, in 1999, with the name and boundaries of the Preseli Pembrokeshire Westminster constituency. It was a Dyfed constituency, one of five constituencies covering, and entirely within, the preserved county of Dyfed.

The other four Dyfed constituencies were Carmarthen West and South Pembrokeshire, Carmarthen East and Dinefwr, Ceredigion and Llanelli. They were all within the Mid and West Wales electoral region.

The region consisted of the eight constituencies of Brecon and Radnorshire, Carmarthen East and Dinefwr, Carmarthen West and South Pembrokeshire, Ceredigion, Llanelli, Meirionnydd Nant Conwy, Montgomeryshire and Preseli Pembrokeshire.

=== From 2007 ===
Boundaries changed at the 2007 Assembly election. Preseli Pembrokeshire remained one of five Dyfed constituencies and one of eight constituencies in the Mid and West Wales region. However, boundaries within Dyfed have changed to realign them with local government ward boundaries and to reduce disparities in the sizes of constituency electorates, and the boundaries of the region changed, to align them with the boundaries of preserved counties.

The other four Dyfed constituencies remain Carmarthen West and South Pembrokeshire, Carmarthen East and Dinefwr, Ceredigion and Llanelli. They were all within the Mid and West Wales electoral region.

The region consisted of the constituencies of Brecon and Radnorshire, Carmarthen East and Dinefwr, Carmarthen West and South Pembrokeshire, Ceredigion, Dwyfor Meirionnydd, Llanelli, Montgomeryshire and Preseli Pembrokeshire.

For Westminster purposes, the same new constituency boundaries became effective for the National General Election in 2010.

== Voting ==
In general elections for the National Assembly for Wales, each voter had two votes. The first vote was used to vote for a candidate to become the Assembly Member for the voter's constituency, elected by the first past the post system. The second vote was used to vote for a regional closed party list of candidates. Additional member seats were allocated from the lists by the d'Hondt method, with constituency results being taken into account in the allocation.

== Assembly Members and Members of the Senedd ==
Election	Member	Party	Portrait
1999	Richard Edwards	Labour	
2003	Tamsin Dunwoody-Kneafsey	Labour	
2007	Paul Davies	Conservative	

== Elections ==
=== Elections in the 2020s ===
2021 Senedd election: Preseli Pembrokeshire
Party	Candidate	Constituency			Regional		
Party	Candidate	Votes	%	±%	Votes	%	±%
Conservative	Paul Davies (Note: Incumbent member for this constituency)	12,295	39.0	-0.2	10,631	33.8	+2.7
Labour	Jackie Jones	10,895	34.6	+9.3	10,421	33.1	+9.4
Plaid Cymru	Cris Tomos	6,135	19.5	+5.6	5,684	18.1	+1.1
Reform	William Dennison	1,239	3.9	New	426	1.35	New
Liberal Democrats	Tina Roberts	952	3.0	-2.9	763	2.4	-1.7
Green					1,329	4.2	-0.1
Abolish					1,072	3.4	-1.6
UKIP					534	1.7	-10.4
Christian					172	0.6	New
Freedom Alliance (UK)					153	0.5	New
Gwlad					122	0.4	New
Communist					74	0.2	0.0
Propel					71	0.2	New
TUSC					32	0.1	New
Majority		1,400	4.4	−9.5			
Turnout		31,516					
Conservative hold		Swing					

=== Elections in the 2010s ===
Welsh Assembly Election 2016: Preseli Pembrokeshire
Party	Candidate	Constituency			Regional		
Party	Candidate	Votes	%	±%	Votes	%	±%
Conservative	Paul Davies	11,123	39.2	-3.2	8,607	31.1	-4.7
Labour	Dan Lodge	7,193	25.3	-9.1	6,547	23.7	-6.9
Plaid Cymru	John Osmond	3,957	13.9	-1.6	4,701	17.0	+1.5
UKIP	Howard Lillyman	3,286	11.6	New	3,351	12.1	+7.9
Liberal Democrats	Bob Kilmister	1,677	5.9	-1.8	1,131	4.1	-1.3
Green	Frances Bryant	1,161	4.1	New	1,182	4.3	+0.4
Abolish					1,385	5.0	New
People First (Wales)					137	0.5	New
Monster Raving Loony					132	0.5	New
Welsh Christian					135	0.5	-0.1
Association of Welsh Independents					279	1.0	New
Communist					58	0.2	-0.1
Majority		3,930	13.9	+5.9			
Turnout		28,937	50.3	+3.3			
Conservative hold		Swing					

Welsh Assembly Election 2011: Preseli Pembrokeshire
Party	Candidate	Constituency			Regional		
Party	Candidate	Votes	%	±%	Votes	%	±%
Conservative	Paul Davies	11,541	42.4	+3.8	9,773	35.8	+1.3
Labour	Terry Mills	9,366	34.4	+7.0	8,353	30.6	+6.7
Plaid Cymru	Rhys Sinnett	4,226	15.5	−9.2	4,238	15.5	-6.8
Liberal Democrats	Bob Kilmister	2,085	7.7	−1.5	1,462	5.4	-1.2
Green					1,074	3.9	0.0
UKIP					1,142	4.2	+0.6
Socialist Labour					654	2.4	+1.3
BNP					350	1.3	-1.1
Welsh Christian					168	0.6	+0.1
Communist					76	0.3	0.0
Majority		2,175	8.0	−3.2			
Turnout		27,218	47.0	−3.9			
Conservative hold		Swing	−1.6				

Regional ballots rejected: 203

=== Elections in the 2000s ===
Welsh Assembly Election 2007: Preseli Pembrokeshire
Party	Candidate	Constituency			Regional		
Party	Candidate	Votes	%	±%	Votes	%	±%
Conservative	Paul Davies	11,086	38.6	+9.1	9,916	34.5	+10.0
Labour	Tamsin Dunwoody	7,881	27.4	−7.9	6,863	23.9	-10.4
Plaid Cymru	John Osmond	7,101	24.7	+1.8	6,396	22.3	+3.2
Liberal Democrats	Hywel Davies	2,652	9.2	−3.1	1,895	6.6	-4.2
Green					1,113	3.9	-1.0
UKIP					1,024	3.6	0.0
BNP					686	2.4	New
Socialist Labour					310	1.1	New
Welsh Christian					143	0.5	New
Gwynoro Jones - Independent					136	0.5	New
Communist					83	0.3	New
Caroline Evans - Independent					60	0.2	New
CPA					43	0.1	New
Veritas					42	0.1	New
Majority		3,205	11.2	N/A			
Turnout		28,720	50.9	+9.5			
Conservative gain from Labour		Swing	+8.5				

Welsh Assembly Election 2003: Preseli Pembrokeshire
Party	Candidate	Constituency			Regional		
Party	Candidate	Votes	%	±%	Votes	%	±%
Labour	Tamsin Dunwoody	8,067	35.3	+0.9	7,781	34.1	+2.8
Conservative	Paul Windsor Davies	6,741	29.5	+6.9	5,587	24.5	+1.2
Plaid Cymru	Sion T. Jobbins	5,227	22.9	−2.0	4,356	19.1	-9.5
Liberal Democrats	Michael I. Warden	2,799	12.3	+0.8	2,462	10.8	+0.4
Green					1,116	4.9	Unknown
UKIP					813	3.6	New
Mid and West Wales Pensioners					416	1.8	New
Cymru Annibynnol					167	0.7	New
Vote 2 Stop the War					94	0.4	New
Prolife Alliance					42	0.2	New
Majority		1,326	5.8	−3.7			
Turnout		22,834	41.4	−12.2			
Labour hold		Swing	−3.0				

2003 Electorate: 55,195
Regional ballots rejected: 313

=== Elections in the 1990s ===
Welsh Assembly Election 1999: Preseli Pembrokeshire
Party	Candidate	Constituency			Regional		
Party	Candidate	Votes	%	±%	Votes	%	±%
Labour	Richard Edwards	9,997	34.4	N/A	9,057	31.3	N/A
Plaid Cymru	Conrad L. Bryant	7,239	24.9	N/A	8,278	28.6	N/A
Conservative	Felix F.E. Aubel	6,585	22.6	N/A	6,763	23.3	N/A
Liberal Democrats	David G.B. Lloyd	3,338	11.5	N/A	3,014	10.4	N/A
Independent	Alwyn C. Luke	1,944	6.7	N/A			
Other list parties					1,854	6.4	N/A
Majority		2,758	9.5	N/A			
Turnout		29,103	53.6	N/A			
Labour win (new seat)							
