= Clarion (magazine) =

Literary magazine

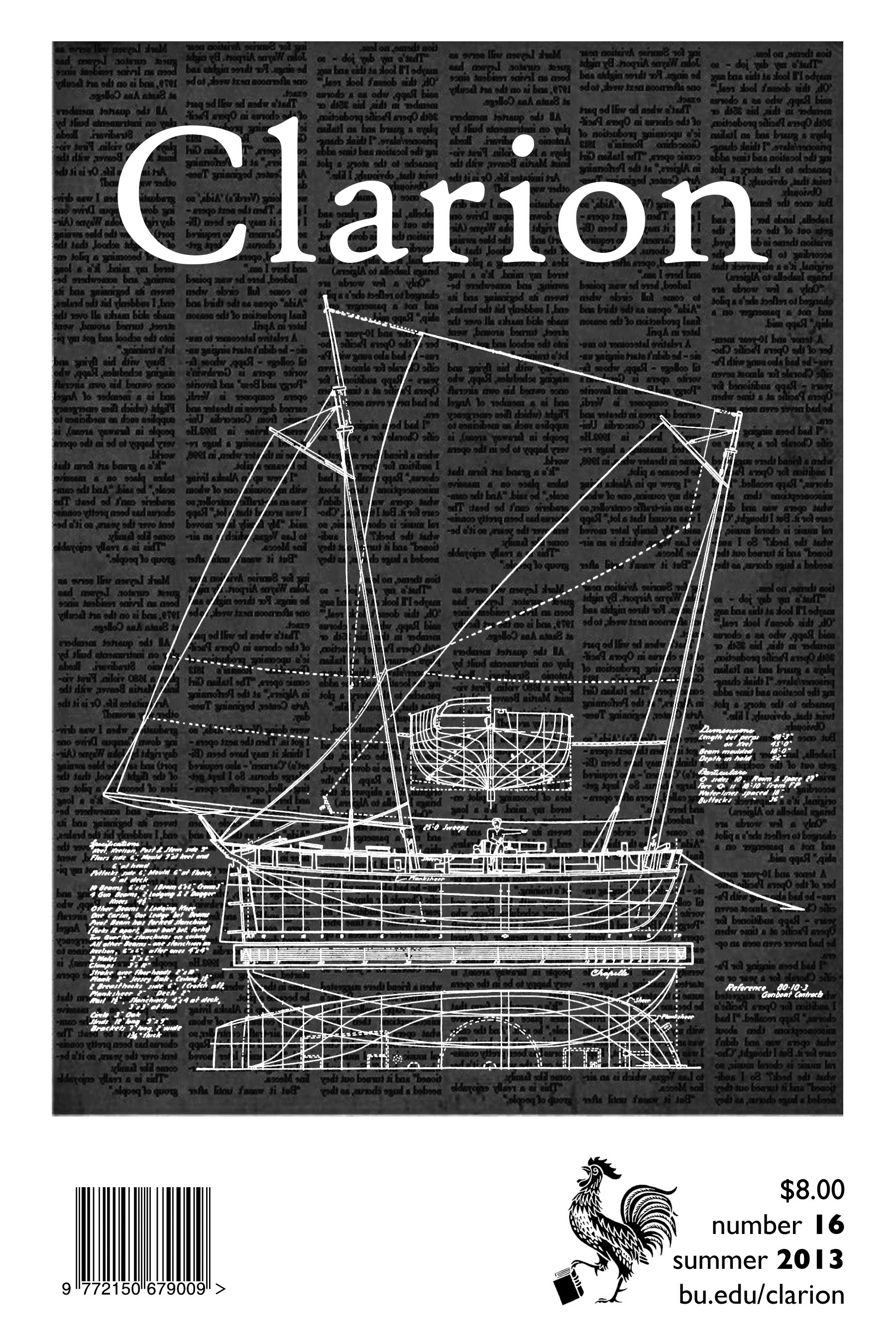
- Clarion #16, Summer 2013
- Editors: Jon Maniscalco & Frances Gossen (2013- )
- Former editors: Jennifer Herron (1997-99); Josette Akresh (1999-2000); Zachary Bos (2001-2); Elizabeth Moss (2002-3); Garrison Gudenas (2004); Nicole Norman (2004-5); Bora Panduku (2005-6); Tom Simmons & Matthew Lemoyne (2006-7); Juliet Johnson (2007-8); Sandy SooHoo (2008-9); Sara Trotta (2009-10); Monica Gribouski (2011-2)
- Categories: Poetry; Prose; Reviews; Interviews
- Frequency: Annually
- Publisher: The Pen & Anvil Press and Boston University
- First issue: Spring 1998
- Country: United States
- Based in: Boston, Massachusetts
- Language: English
- Website: bu.edu/clarion
- ISSN: 2150-6795

Clarion is a literary magazine founded at Boston University in 1998.

== History ==
The first issue, titled ? (stylized as The Staff Issue of ?) was published by an undergraduate student group named the Boston University Literary Society. Subsequent issues were released under the name Clarion.

In the beginning Clarion only published the writing of Boston University students. In 2008, the editors opened submissions to all writers, regardless of their affiliation with the university.

In 2011, The Pen & Anvil Press, a Boston-based imprint operated by the nonprofit Boston Poetry Union, took over responsibility for publishing Clarion, in agreement with BULS and the BU Literary Organizations liaison. Through its cooperation with the BULS, the Creative Writing department, and the BU Creative Writing Club, Clarion continues to employ undergraduate editors on its staff, alongside graduate editors and persons independent of the university.

In 2013, The Review Review included Clarion on its list of notable Boston-based literary magazines.

== Boston University Literary Society ==
The Boston University Literary Society was founded as Boston University Students for Literary Awareness in Fall 1997, under the leadership of Jennifer Herron. The original members intended to publish a magazine titled The View from a Window, though it was then renamed, becoming ? (and then Clarion) and ultimately released in Spring 1998.

In 2009, the Literary Society started Burn, a students-only showcase of edgier experimental writing, and in 2010 offered the editors of formerly independent publications, Back Bay Review (art criticism) and Pusteblume (literary translation) a home under the Boston University Literary Society administration.
