= Camrose, Pembrokeshire (electoral ward) =

Welsh electoral ward

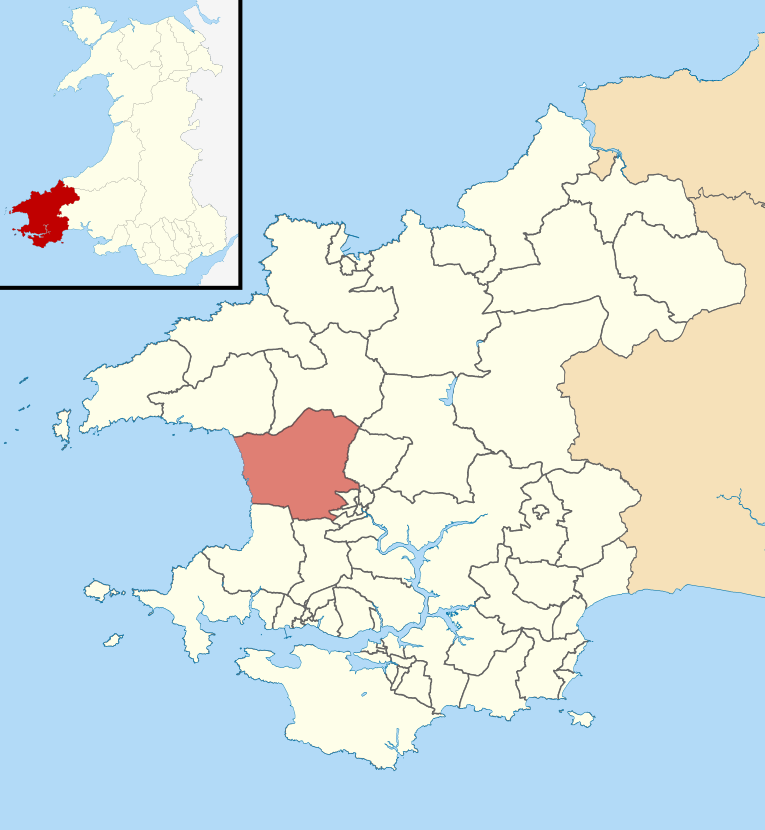
Location of the pre-2022 Camrose ward within Pembrokeshire

Camrose is an electoral ward in Pembrokeshire, Wales. Since May 2022 the ward has been coterminous the community of Camrose. The community of Camrose consists of part of Pembrokeshire Coast National Park

According to the UK 2011 Census the population of the Camrose ward was 2,565 (with 2,148 of these of voting age).

Camrose councillor Jamie Adams was leader of Pembrokeshire County Council from May 2012 until the May 2017 elections.

== History ==
A ward of Pembrokeshire County Council since 1995 Camrose was previously a ward of the former Preseli Pembrokeshire District Council.

Until the 2022 local elections the ward also covered the community of Nolton and Roch. Following the recommendations of a boundary review by the Local Government Boundary Commission for Wales, the ward was reconfigured, with Nolton and Roch being transferred and merged with the neighbouring ward of The Havens.

== County elections ==
At the first election for the new Pembrokeshire County Council in 1995, an Independent, previously a member of Preseli Pembrokeshire District Council was elected.

Camrose 1995
Party	Candidate	Votes	%	±%
Independent	James Desmond Edward Codd*	unopposed		
Independent hold		Swing		

At the second election, in 1999 the Conservative Party fielded candidates in Pembrokeshire for the first time but they were heavily defeated in Camrose.

Camrose 1999
Party	Candidate	Votes	%	±%
Independent	James Desmond Edward Codd*	803	72.9	+72.9
Conservative	David Loosemore	298	27.1	+27.1
Majority		505	45.8	
Independent hold		Swing		

At the third election, in 2004 Desmond Codd stood down and Jamie Adams was elected in a four cornered contest.

Camrose 2004
Party	Candidate	Votes	%	±%
Independent	James Llewellyn Adams	572	46.8	+46.8
Independent	Roger James Mathias	362	29.6	+29.6
Liberal Democrats	Karen Smith	181	14.8	+14.8
Independent	Jean Mary Jones	106	8.7	+8.7
Majority		210	17.2	
Independent hold		Swing		

Adams was returned unopposed in 2008.

Camrose 2008
Party	Candidate	Votes	%	±%
Independent	James Llewellyn Adams*	unopposed		
Independent hold		Swing		

In 2012, Adams was again returned unopposed.

Camrose 2012
Party	Candidate	Votes	%	±%
Independent	James Llewellyn Adams*	unopposed		
Independent hold		Swing		

At the May 2017 elections Adams was elected again after another four cornered contest.

Camrose 2017
Party	Candidate	Votes	%	±%
Independent	Jamie Adams*	448		
Independent	Nicky Watts	358		
Conservative	Jonathan Twigg	275		
Plaid Cymru	Kay Dearing	135		
Independent hold		Swing		

* = sitting councillor prior to the election
