= Abergwili (electoral ward) =

Electoral ward in Carmarthenshire, Wales

Abergwili is an electoral ward, representing the communities of Abergwili and Llanllawddog, Carmarthenshire, Wales.

== Profile ==
In 2014, the Abergwili electoral ward had an electorate of 1,906. The total population was 2,335, of whom 71.6% were born in Wales. 55.7% of the population were able to speak Welsh.

== Current Representation ==
The Abergwili Ward is a single-member ward for the purposes of Carmarthenshire County Council elections. Since 2017 it has been represented by Plaid Cymru councillor Dorian Williams.

== Carmarthenshire County Council ==
The first election to the new unitary Carmarthenshire County Council took place in 1995. Pam Palmer, who had represented the ward on the former Carmarthen District Council was elected with a large majority over the Plaid Cymru candidate.

Abergwili 1995
Party	Candidate	Votes	%	±%
Independent	Pamela Ann Palmer*	671	72.5	
Plaid Cymru	Frances Jane Dixon	254	27.5	
Majority		417	45.0	
Independent hold		Swing		

In 1999, Palmer was returned unopposed.

Abergwili 1999
Party	Candidate	Votes	%	±%
Independent	Pamela Ann Palmer*	unopposed		
Independent hold		Swing		

Palmer faced opposition from Plaid Cymru and the Labour Party in 2004 but comfortably retained the seat.

Abergwili 2004
Party	Candidate	Votes	%	±%
Independent	Pamela Ann Palmer*	677	61.4	+61.4
Plaid Cymru	Henry Jones-Davies	246	22.3	+22.3
Labour	Frances Elizabeth Owens	179	16.2	+16.2
Majority		431	39.1	
Independent hold		Swing		

In 2008, faced only by a Plaid Cymru opponent, Palmer increased her vote significantly.

Abergwili 2008
Party	Candidate	Votes	%	±%
Independent	Pamela Ann Palmer*	742	76.4	+15.0
Plaid Cymru	Carl Harris	229	23.6	+1.3
Majority		513	52.8	+13.7
Independent hold		Swing		

At the 2012 election, Palmer was faced by an experienced Plaid Cymru candidate who had fought the Neath by-election in 1991. She was again returned but with a much-reduced majority.

Abergwili 2012
Party	Candidate	Votes	%	±%
Independent	Pamela Ann Palmer*	600	57.9	−18.5
Plaid Cymru	Dewi Richard Evans	436	42.1	+18.5
Majority		164	15.8	−37.0
Turnout			56.5	
Independent hold		Swing	18.5	

== History ==
=== County Council Elections ===
Abergwili first became an electoral ward in the late nineteenth century with the formation of Carmarthenshire County Council and elected a member to that authority until its abolition in 1974.

With the formation of Dyfed County Council, Abergwili was part of the Carmarthen Rural No.6 Ward. This ward was renamed Abergwili in 1989. This ward was considerably larger than the previous Abergwili ward and included Cynwyl Elfed, Bronwydd and Abernant.

When the current Carmarthenshire County Council was formed in 1995 a ward based on similar boundaries to those in existence between 1889 and 1974 was re-established.

=== District Council Elections ===
From 1973 until 1996, Abergwili formed an electoral ward for the purposes of elections to Carmarthen District Council.
