= Geraint Davies (Plaid Cymru politician) =

Welsh former politician (born 1948)

- Official portrait, 1999

Assembly Member
- In office 6 May 1999 – 1 May 2003
- Preceded by: Assembly established
- Succeeded by: Leighton Andrews
- Constituency: Rhondda
- Majority: 2,285

Member of Rhondda Cynon Taf County Borough Council
- In office 4 May 1995 – 5 May 2022
- Ward: Treherbert
- Preceded by: Council established
- Succeeded by: Scott Emanuel; Will Jones

Personal details
- Born: Geraint Rhys Davies; 1 December 1948 (age 77) Treherbert
- Party: Plaid Cymru
- Children: 4
- Relatives: Horace Williams (father-in-law)
- Education: University of London (BPharm)

Geraint Rhys Davies (born 1 December 1948) is a Welsh former Plaid Cymru politician who served as Assembly Member (AM) for Rhondda from 1999 to 2003. He was the first AM for the constituency. He served as a member of Rhondda Cynon Taf County Borough Council for Treherbert from 1995 to 2022.

== Early life and career ==
Geraint Rhys Davies was born in Treherbert, Rhondda Cynon Taf, Wales, on 1 December 1948. He attended Pentre Grammar School and later studied at the University of London, where he graduated with a Bachelor of Pharmacy (BPharm) at the Chelsea College of Science and Technology.

Following his graduation, Davies undertook training at the Rookwood Hospital in Cardiff from 1971 to 1972. From 1972 to 1975, he worked as a manager at Boots the Chemists (now known as Boots), and in 1975, he became a self-employed community pharmacist in Treherbert. He had also worked as a deacon, school governor, and president of Blaenrhondda A.F.C..

== Political career ==
Davies served as a member of the former Rhondda Borough Council from 1983 to 1996. He unsuccessfully contested for parliament against Allan Rogers.

In the 1995 Rhondda Cynon Taf County Borough Council election, Davies was elected as a councillor and represented the Treherbert ward. He served as leader of the council's Plaid Cymru group for thirteen years. In the 2022 election, Davies did not seek re-election.

=== Assembly Member (1999–2003) ===
In the 1999 National Assembly for Wales election, Davies was elected the assembly member (AM) for Rhondda, defeating Labour candidate Wayne David, MEP for South Wales Central, receiving 13,558 votes (48.73%) and a majority of 2,285. The result was described by BBC News as "one of the most remarkable successes" of the 1999 election, with Rhondda having been considered a red wall seat.

In June 1999, Davies and two other Plaid AMs (leader Dafydd Wigley and Helen Mary Jones) engaged in a walkout from the chamber following criticism by Lynne Neagle on the party's plans for a Welsh embassy in Brussels.

Davies was appointed the Plaid Cymru spokesperson for the Welsh valleys in August 2000. He was a member of the assembly Health and Social Care Committee and the Audit Committee. Davies' political assistant, Leanne Wood, later went on to become an AM and the leader of Plaid Cymru.

In May 2002, Davies was part of a delegation, alongside Plaid MEPs Jill Evans and Eurig Wyn, which met with Yasser Arafat, president of the Palestinian National Authority, in Ramallah, West Bank, Palestine, as part of a peace mission to the Middle East.

In the 2003 National Assembly for Wales election, Davies received 6,216 votes (27%), coming second and losing the Rhondda seat to Labour candidate Leighton Andrews.

== Electoral history ==
Election	Seat	Party	Votes	Percentage (%)	Result	Source
Rhondda Cynon Taf County Borough Council, 1995	Treherbet	Plaid Cymru	1,487	50.3	Elected	
Rhondda Cynon Taf County Borough Council, 1999	Treherbet	Plaid Cymru	1,972	64.8	Elected	
National Assembly for Wales, 1999	Rhondda	Plaid Cymru	13,558	48.73	Elected	
National Assembly for Wales, 2003	Rhondda	Plaid Cymru	6,216	27	Not elected	
Rhondda Cynon Taf County Borough Council, 2004	Treherbet	Plaid Cymru	1,063	49.7	Elected	
Rhondda Cynon Taf County Borough Council, 2008	Treherbert	Plaid Cymru	1,382	58.9	Elected	
Rhondda Cynon Taf County Borough Council, 2012	Treherbet	Plaid Cymru	1,081	29.86	Elected	
Rhondda Cynon Taf County Borough Council, 2017	Treherbet	Plaid Cymru	1,192	29.97	Elected	

== Personal life and honours ==
Davis married his wife Merril, daughter of Horace Williams, on 17 March 1973. They have three sons and a daughter. Davies was honoured as a bard into the Gorsedd Cymru at the 2024 Rhondda Cynon Taf National Eisteddfod.

== See also ==
- 1st National Assembly for Wales
- List of Plaid Cymru MSs
- List of Welsh-speaking politicians

Senedd
Preceded by Assembly established	Assembly Member for Rhondda; 1999 – 2003	Succeeded by Leighton Andrews
