= List of Welsh-speaking politicians =

This is a list of Welsh-speaking politicians.

Name	Party	Notes
William Abraham	Labour	
William Abraham	Liberal-Labour	
Stuart Andrew	Conservative	
Leighton Andrews	Labour	
Rhun ap Iorwerth	Plaid Cymru	
Ambrose Bebb	Plaid Cymru	
Guto Bebb	Conservative	
Eleanor Burnham	Liberal Democrats	
Alun Cairns	Conservative	
Julian Cayo-Evans	FWA	
Ann Clwyd	Labour	
Emyr Currie-Jones	Labour	
Cynog Dafis	Plaid Cymru	
Alun Davies	Plaid Cymru	
Alun Davies	Labour	
Dafydd Trystan Davies	Plaid Cymru	
David TC Davies	Conservative	
Glyn Davies	Conservative	
John Cledwyn Davies	Liberal	
Keith Davies	Labour	
Paul Davies	Conservative	
Ron Davies	Labour	
Suzy Davies	Conservative	
John Dixon	Plaid Cymru	
Jane Dodds	Liberal Democrats	
Mark Drakeford	Labour	
Dafydd Elis-Thomas	Plaid Cymru	
T. E. Ellis	Liberal	
Gwynfor Evans	Plaid Cymru	
Jill Evans	Plaid Cymru	
Nerys Evans	Plaid Cymru	
Paul Flynn	Labour	
Hywel Francis	Labour	
Llyr Gruffydd	Plaid Cymru	
Siân Gwenllian	Plaid Cymru	
Eurfyl ap Gwilym	Plaid Cymru	
Geraint Howells	Liberal Democrats	
Ednyfed Hudson Davies	Labour	
Ednyfed Hudson Davies	Social Democratic Party	
Dafydd Iwan	Plaid Cymru	
Siân James	Labour	
Delyth Jewell	Plaid Cymru	
Alun Ffred Jones	Plaid Cymru	
Arfon Jones	Plaid Cymru	
Carwyn Jones	Labour	
David Jones	Conservative	
David Elwyn Jones	Conservative	
David Elwyn Jones	United Kingdom Independence Party	
Elin Jones	Plaid Cymru	
Gareth Jones	Plaid Cymru	
Gwynoro Jones	Labour	
Helen Mary Jones	Plaid Cymru	
Ieuan Wyn Jones	Plaid Cymru	
Glenys Kinnock	Labour	
Ben Lake	Plaid Cymru	
Gwenllian Lansdown	Plaid Cymru	
Robyn Léwis	Plaid Cymru	
Steffan Lewis	Plaid Cymru	
David Lloyd George	Liberal	
David Lloyd	Plaid Cymru	
Elfyn Llwyd	Plaid Cymru	
Neil McEvoy	Plaid Cymru	
Neil McEvoy	Propel	
Llinos Medi Huws	Plaid Cymru	
Alun Michael	Labour	
Jeremy Miles	Labour	
Edward Millward	Plaid Cymru	
David Eirwyn Morgan	Plaid Cymru	
Eluned Morgan	Labour	
Rhodri Morgan	Labour	
Marc Phillips	Plaid Cymru	
Enoch Powell	Conservative	
Enoch Powell	Ulster Unionist Party	
Alun Pugh	Labour	
Chris Rees	Plaid Cymru	
Rod Richards	Conservative	
Roger Roberts	Liberal Democrats	
Aled Roberts	Liberal Democrats	
Wyn Rogers	Conservative	
Liz Saville Roberts	Plaid Cymru	
Bethan Sayed	Plaid Cymru	
Rhodri Glyn Thomas	Plaid Cymru	
Roger Thomas	Labour	
Simon Thomas	Plaid Cymru	
Lee Waters	Labour	
Lee Waters	Co-operative Party	
Dafydd Wigley	Plaid Cymru	
Betty Williams	Labour	
Brynle Williams	Conservative	
Hywel Williams	Plaid Cymru	
Phil Williams	Plaid Cymru	
W. Llewelyn Williams	Liberal	
Beth Winter	Labour	
Leanne Wood	Plaid Cymru	
Eurig Wyn	Plaid Cymru	
