= Christine Chapman =

British politician (born 1956)

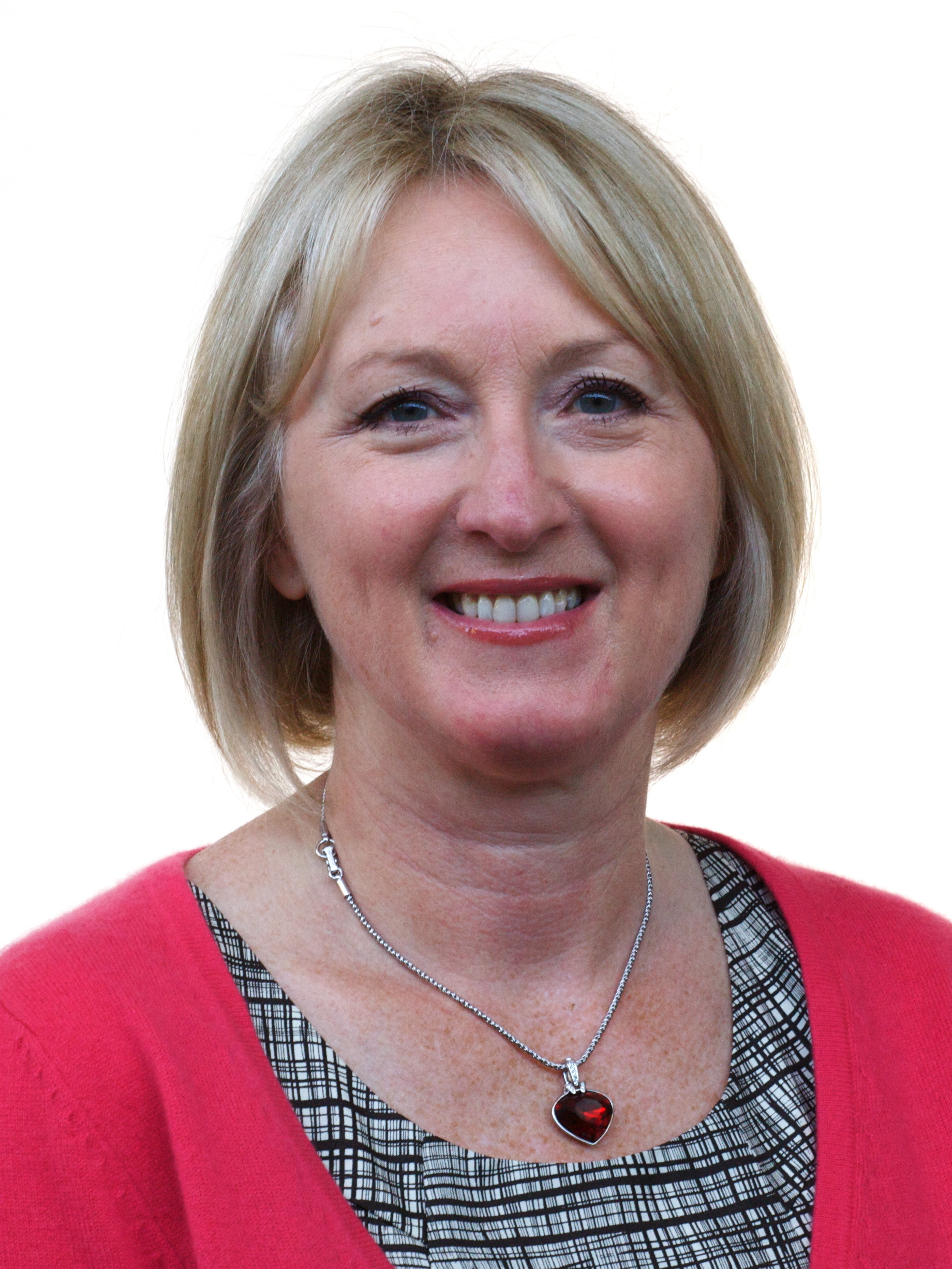
- Official portrait, 2011

Member of the Welsh Assembly for Cynon Valley
- In office 6 May 1999 – 6 April 2016
- Preceded by: New Assembly
- Succeeded by: Vikki Howells
- Majority: 6,515 (34.7%)

Personal details
- Born: Christine Price; 7 April 1956 (age 70) Porth, Rhondda, Wales
- Party: Welsh Labour Co-op
- Spouse: Michael Chapman (m. 1981)
- Children: 2
- Education: Porth County School for Girls
- Alma mater: University of Wales, Aberystwyth (BA Hons); South Bank Polytechnic (Dip.); University of Wales, Cardiff (MSc Econ; University of Wales, Swansea (PGCE)
- Website: Official website

Christine Chapman (born 7 April 1956) is a Welsh Labour Co-operative politician who was a Member of the National Assembly for Wales for Cynon Valley from 1999 to 2016.

Chapman has not held senior government posts and has been described in the Assembly Handbook as "one of the quietest women AMs ... [whose] effectiveness lies in her quiet willingness to discuss".

== Early life and career ==
Christine Price was born on 7 April 1956 in Porth, Rhondda, Wales, the only child of John Price and Edith Jean Price. In an interview from 2014, she described her father as a trade unionist who worked at the British Overseas Airways Corporation and then British Airways, while she said her mother worked in factory offices until she was 70 years old. She was educated at Porth County School for Girls in Rhondda. She then studied at the University of Wales, Aberystwyth, where she graduated with a bachelor of arts in classical studies and history in 1978. She later studied part-time at South Bank Polytechnic, where she obtained a diploma in careers guidance, the University of Wales, Cardiff, where she obtained a master of science in economics, and also the University of Wales, Swansea, where she obtained a postgraduate certificate in education.

Prior to her career in national politics, Chapman (Note: Price married Michael Chapman in 1981.) worked as a teacher, careers adviser and youth worker. From 1979 to 1980, she was a supervisor at the Mid Glamorgan Community Services Agency. From 1980, she worked as a supervisor at the Mid Glamorgan Careers Service, where she remained until 1993. She was seconded to the Mid Glamorgan Education Business Partnership from 1993 to 1994 before working as a consultant and secondary school teacher from 1995 to 1996. From 1996 to 1999, she was a co-ordinator at the Torfaen Education Business Partnership. She was also the chair of governors at Trerobart Primary School and a member of the Institute of Careers Guidance, chairing its branch in South Wales. She also became the director of Mid Glamorgan Careers Ltd following the completion of her postgraduate studies.

== Early political career ==
Why I became a politician was because I felt I wanted to make a difference. I think partly, this is my feminism again, I remember seeing when I worked as a careers advisor, this cocky councillor coming in. He was so arrogant. He was really talking down to me. I said, "Who's that?" And they said, "Don't say anything to him, he's a councillor." I said, "What!" I got so angry that people like him were representing us [...] I said "I'm going to do this. I'm not having him representing me." It was partly anger on my part, so that's why I got involved in politics.

— Chapman explains why she entered politics in an interview from 2014.

Chapman joined the Labour Party in 1979. In an interview from 2014, she attributed her politicisation to her feminist views, an aspiration to "make a difference" and her "anger" at an encounter with an "arrogant" local councillor who spoke down to her during her time as a careers adviser. She later stood for Labour in the 1991 local elections to Taff-Ely District Council, as one of two party candidates for the electoral ward of Trallwng; she won 560 votes but was not elected. From 1992 to 1994, she was the political education officer of the Cynon Valley Labour Party.

In the first election to the new local authority of Rhondda Cynon Taf County Borough Council in 1995, Chapman stood as the Labour candidate for the electoral ward of Ynysybwyl. She stood on a platform of listening to and acting on the concerns of ward residents. Her main opponent was former ward councillor Gernant Jones of Plaid Cymru, who ran on a platform of prioritising the needs of the young and the elderly. Chapman won the ward by one vote after a six-hour count, narrowly defeating Jones with 696 votes to his 695. At the same time, she was also elected to serve on Ynysybwyl Community Council.

In Rhondda Cynon Taf County Borough Council, Chapman served as the vice-chair of the Community Development and Libraries Sub-Committee from 1995 to 1998. She also served as the chair of the Management Committee of the Pupil Referral Unit in 1998. She stood down from the county council at the 1999 council election.

== National Assembly for Wales ==
In January 1999, Chapman was selected by a ballot of local party members as the Labour Party's candidate for the constituency of Cynon Valley in the 1999 National Assembly for Wales election, the first election to the devolved legislature since the passage of a referendum which enabled its creation in 1997. On her selection, she said her priorities if elected to the assembly would be to improve local communities by addressing the causes of deprivation and poverty, which she said had been "fostered" by the 18 years of UK governance under the Conservative Party from 1979 to 1997. She also confirmed that she would stand down from Rhondda Cynon Taf County Borough Council at the 1999 council election, explaining that she wanted to focus her attention on her work in the assembly and her campaign to support Rhodri Morgan in the 1999 Welsh Labour leadership election.

At the assembly election in May 1999, Chapman was elected as the new assembly member (AM) for Cynon Valley with 9,883 votes, a majority of 677 over the second-place candidate, Phil Richards of Plaid Cymru. She was re-elected in the 2003 assembly election with 10,841 votes, on an increased majority of 7,117 over Plaid's candidate David Walters. She was re-elected again in the 2007 assembly election with 11,058 votes, this time on a decreased majority of 5,623 over Plaid Cymru candidate Liz Walters, and again in the 2011 assembly election with 11,626 votes, this time on an increased majority of 6,515 over the Plaid Cymru candidate Dafydd Trystan Davies.

In the National Assembly for Wales, Chapman took an interest in the policy areas of education, training, social exclusion and equal opportunities. She aligned herself with the devolutionist faction of the Labour group in the National Assembly. In its first term, she was a member of the Audit Committee, the Equality of Opportunity Committee, and the Post-16 Education and Training Committee. She served as Deputy Secretary for Education and Economy from February to October 2000. From 2000 to 2004, she chaired the Objective One Programme Monitoring Committee, finding the time to complete an MPhil degree at Cardiff University in June 2001.

She was Chair of the Assembly's Women and Democracy Group and Secretary of the Labour UNISON Group. She supported the "Children Are Unbeatable Alliance" which seeks prohibit all corporal or physical punishment of children.

Chapman stood down in 2016 and was succeeded at the 2016 Welsh Assembly elections by Vikki Howells.

She is a committee member for Women's Archive Wales.

== Personal life ==
Chapman married her husband Michael Chapman, a general practitioner, on 5 September 1981. They have two children, a son named Stephen and a daughter named Rhiannon. The family live in Ynysybwl in Cwm Clydach, Rhondda Cynon Taf, where she has lived with her husband since 1992. Following her election to the National Assembly for Wales in 1999, she planned to attend lessons to learn the Welsh language. In an article from 2020, Chapman revealed that she previously had bulimia nervosa since the age of 15, but that she had undergone successful therapy to treat the disorder since 2016.

== Offices held ==
National Assembly for Wales
| Preceded by (new post) | Assembly Member for Cynon Valley; 1999–2016 | Succeeded by Vikki Howells |
Political offices
| Preceded by (new post) | Deputy Minister for Education & Lifelong Learning; 2005 - 2007 | Succeeded by John Griffiths |
| Preceded by (new post) | Deputy Minister for Finance, Local Government & Public Services; 2005 - 2007 | Succeeded by (post reorganised) |
