= 1995 Rhondda Cynon Taf County Borough Council election =

1995 Welsh local government election

The first election to Rhondda Cynon Taf County Borough Council was held on 4 May 1995. It was followed by the 1999 election. On the same day there were elections to the other 21 local authorities in Wales and community councils in Wales.

== Overview ==
All council seats were up for election. These were the first elections held following local government reorganisation and the abolition of Mid Glamorgan County Council. The ward boundaries for the new authority were based on the previous Cynon Valley Borough Council, Rhondda Borough Council and Taff Ely Borough Council although the number of members elected for individual wards was reduced.

Labour won a majority of the seats.

Rhondda Cynon Taf County Borough Council election result 1995
Party	Seats	Gains	Losses	Net gain/loss	Seats %	Votes %	Votes	+/−
Labour	54							
Conservative	0							
Liberal Democrats	1							
Plaid Cymru	14							
Independent	3							
Green	0							
Independent Labour	1							
Other parties	1							

== Previous members of Mid Glamorgan Council ==
Most sitting members of Mid Glamorgan County council sought election to the new authority. A number were also members of the previous district councils but others contested a ward against a sitting district councillor.

== Results ==
=== Aberaman North (two seats) ===
The boundaries were identical to those of the same ward on the previous Cynon Valley Borough Council.

Aberaman North 1995
Party	Candidate	Votes	%	±%
Labour	B. Fitzgerald*	1,399	38.01%	
Labour	Anthony Christopher*	1,364	37.06%	
Plaid Cymru	C.M. Badham	459	12.47%	
Plaid Cymru	G. Lewis	458	12.44%	
Majority		905	24.59%	
Turnout		3680	49%	
Registered electors		3,975		
Labour hold		Swing		

=== Aberaman South (two seats) ===
The boundaries were identical to those of the same ward on the previous Cynon Valley Borough Council.

Aberaman South 1995
Party	Candidate	Votes	%	±%
Plaid Cymru	A.D. Griffiths*	958	24.56%	
Plaid Cymru	B.J. Walter Codd*	936	24%	
Labour	B.R. Loveridge	731	18.74%	
Labour	J. Rosser	725	18.59%	
Independent Plaid	H.E. Davies*	550	14.10%	
Majority		205	5.26%	
Turnout		3900	55.9%	
Registered electors		3,731		
Plaid Cymru hold		Swing		

=== Abercynon (two seats) ===
The boundaries were identical to those of the same ward on the previous Cynon Valley Borough Council.

Abercynon 1995
Party	Candidate	Votes	%	±%
Labour	Alby .L. Davies*	1,288	29.06%	
Independent Labour	Stuart .G. Gregory*	1,088	24.54%	
Labour	P.C. Brown*	971	21.91%	
Plaid Cymru	B. Hicks	624	14.08%	
Plaid Cymru	D. Surfield	367	8.28%	
Green	John Matthews	94	2.12%	
Majority		117	2.64%	
Turnout		4432	49.1%	
Registered electors		4,846		
Labour hold		Swing		
Independent Labour win (new seat)				

=== Aberdare East (two seats) ===
The boundaries were identical to those of the same ward on the previous Cynon Valley Borough Council.

Aberdare East 1995
Party	Candidate	Votes	%	±%
Labour	Shah .M. Imtiaz*	1,437	34.29%	
Labour	Mike Forey*	1,292	31%	
Plaid Cymru	D.A. Walters	728	17.47%	
Plaid Cymru	S. Thomas	710	17.04%	
Majority		564	13.53%	
Turnout		4167	44%	
Registered electors		5,044		
Labour hold		Swing		

=== Aberdare West, Llwydcoed (three seats) ===
Aberdare West, Llwydcoed 1995
Party	Candidate	Votes	%	±%
Plaid Cymru	W. John Daniel*	1,369	18.14%	
Labour	J.A. Evans*	1,347	17.85%	
Plaid Cymru	E.A. Daniel	1,316	17.44%	
Plaid Cymru	A. Mason*	1,307	17.32%	
Labour	M. James*	1,114	14.76%	
Labour	D.E. Morgan*	1,092	14.47%	
Majority		9	0.12%	
Turnout		7545	42.5%	
Registered electors		6,626		
Plaid Cymru hold		Swing		
Labour hold		Swing		
Plaid Cymru win (new seat)				

=== Beddau (one seat) ===
The boundaries were identical to those of the same ward on the previous Taff Ely Borough Council.

Beddau 1995
Party	Candidate	Votes	%	±%
Labour	Daniel Ifor Williams	830	74.57	
Plaid Cymru	M. Eileen Dobbin*	283	25.43	
Majority		547	49.14	
Turnout		1113	34.2	
Registered electors		2,706		
Labour gain from Plaid Cymru		Swing		

=== Brynna (one seat) ===
Brynna 1995
Party	Candidate	Votes	%	±%
Independent	A.D. Hughes	472	51.47%	
Labour	S.M. Harry*	445	48.53%	
Majority		27	2.94%	
Turnout		917	35.6%	
Registered electors		2,593		
Independent gain from Labour		Swing		

=== Church Village (one seat) ===
The boundaries were identical to those of the same ward on the previous Taff Ely Borough Council.

Church Village 1995
Party	Candidate	Votes	%	±%
Labour	Graham Stacey*	609	59.07%	
Plaid Cymru	R.D. Boundford	422	40.93%	
Majority		187	18.14%	
Turnout		1031	46.7%	
Registered electors		2,256		
Labour hold		Swing		

=== Cilfynydd (one seat) ===
Cilfynydd 1995
Party	Candidate	Votes	%	±%
Labour	Wendy .E. Morgan	496	48.44%	
Independent	Steve Belzak*	393	38.38%	
Plaid Cymru	G.R. Davies	135	13.08%	
Majority		103	10.06%	
Turnout		1024	48.5%	
Registered electors		2,111		
Labour gain from Independent		Swing		

=== Cwmbach (one seat) ===
Cwmbach 1995
Party	Candidate	Votes	%	±%
Labour	M.M. Evans*	922	73.58%	
Plaid Cymru	E.L. Smith	331	26.42%	
Majority		591	47.17%	
Turnout		1253	38.7%	
Registered electors		3,500		
Labour hold		Swing		

=== Cwm Clydach (one seat) ===
Cwm Clydach 1995
Party	Candidate	Votes	%	±%
Labour	E.T. Jones*	796	62.14%	
Plaid Cymru	R.W. Jones	439	34.27%	
Green	S. Davies	46	3.59%	
Majority		357	27.87%	
Turnout		1,281	53%	
Registered electors		2,418		
Labour hold		Swing		

=== Cymmer (two seats) ===
Cymmer 1995
Party	Candidate	Votes	%	±%
Labour	Eurwen Davies*	1,241	33.6%	
Labour	A.M. Ellis*	1,199	32.47%	
Plaid Cymru	I. Griffiths	720	19.5%	
Independent	M.D. Simons	313	8.48%	
Green	R. Gair	220	5.96%	
Majority		479	12.97%	
Turnout		3,693	43.7%	
Registered electors		4,779		
Labour hold		Swing		
Labour hold		Swing		

=== Ferndale (two seats) ===
Ferndale 1995
Party	Candidate	Votes	%	±%
Labour	Annette Davies	1,511	42.88%	
Labour	K. Rees	1,105	31.36%	
Plaid Cymru	V. Thomas	734	20.83%	
Green	K. Franks	174	4.94%	
Majority		371	10.58%	
Turnout		3,524	52.8%	
Registered electors		3,628		
Labour win (new seat)				
Labour win (new seat)				

=== Gilfach Goch (one seat) ===
Gilfach Goch 1995
Party	Candidate	Votes	%	±%
Residents	Aurfron Roberts	878	62.94%	
Labour	C.E. Cowley*	517	37.06%	
Majority		361	25.88%	
Turnout		1,395	54%	
Registered electors		2,601		
Residents gain from Labour				

=== Glyncoch (one seat) ===
Glyncoch 1995
Party	Candidate	Votes	%	±%
Labour	Judith G. Burford*	756	73.04%	
Plaid Cymru	M.A. Wiley	279	26.96%	
Majority		477	46.09%	
Turnout		1,035	48.3%	
Registered electors		2,172		
Labour hold		Swing		

=== Graig (one seat) ===
Graig 1995
Party	Candidate	Votes	%	±%
Labour	Joyce Cass*	708	69.1%	
Liberal Democrats	Robert .G. Fox*	316	30.9%	
Majority		392	38.28%	
Turnout		1,024	53.8%	
Registered electors		1,910		
Labour win (new seat)				

=== Hawthorn (one seat) ===
Hawthorn 1995
Party	Candidate	Votes	%	±%
Independent	A.J. Wells	327	47.88%	
Labour	A.J. Jenkins	288	42.17%	
Plaid Cymru	G.E. Rees*	68	9.96%	
Majority		39	5.71%	
Turnout		683	43.8%	
Registered electors		1,609		
Independent win (new seat)				

=== Hirwaun (one seat) ===
Hirwaun 1995
Party	Candidate	Votes	%	±%
Labour	W.A. Myring*	922	65.81%	
Plaid Cymru	L.M. Lewis	479	34.19%	
Majority		443	31.62%	
Turnout		1401	44.1%	
Registered electors		3,172		
Labour hold		Swing		

=== Llanharan (one seat) ===
Llanharan 1995
Party	Candidate	Votes	%	±%
Labour	G. Waters*	497	61.06%	
Plaid Cymru	J.R. Dilworth	317	38.94%	
Majority		180	22.11%	
Turnout		814	35.2%	
Registered electors		2,311		
Labour hold		Swing		

=== Llanharry (one seat) ===
Janet Davies, leader of the Taff Ely Borough Council since 1991, was defeated by a Labour opponent.

Llanharry 1995
Party	Candidate	Votes	%	±%
Labour	W.R. Thomas	659	63.67%	
Plaid Cymru	Janet Davies*	376	36.33%	
Majority		283	27.34%	
Turnout		1,035	57.3%	
Registered electors		1,810		
Labour gain from Plaid Cymru		Swing		

=== Llantrisant (one seat) ===
Llantrisant 1995
Party	Candidate	Votes	%	±%
Plaid Cymru	Islwyn Wilkins	714	50.57	
Labour	Eddie J. Thomas*	698	49.43	
Majority		16	1.14	N/A
Turnout		1412	46.6	
Registered electors		3,110		
Plaid Cymru gain from Labour		Swing		

=== Llantwit Fardre (two seats) ===
Llantwit Fardre 1995
Party	Candidate	Votes	%	±%
Labour	David .F. Stone*	741	26.86%	
Labour	Mike .W. Kear	729	26.42%	
Plaid Cymru	Dennis .R. Watkins	661	23.96%	
Plaid Cymru	Bernard .P. Channon	628	22.76%	
Majority		68	2.46%	
Turnout		2,759	35%	
Registered electors		4,196		
Labour hold		Swing		
Labour win (new seat)				

=== Llwynypia (one seat) ===
Llwynypia 1995
Party	Candidate	Votes	%	±%
Labour	E. Emanuel*	663	65.3	
Plaid Cymru	C. Coombe	353	34.7	
Majority		310	30.6	
Turnout		1,016	54.0	
Registered electors		1,882		
Labour hold		Swing		

=== Maerdy (one seat) ===
Maerdy 1995
Party	Candidate	Votes	%	±%
Labour	Bryn Jones*	1,057	64.14%	
Plaid Cymru	Gerwyn Evans	591	35.86%	
Majority		466	28.28%	
Turnout		1,648	55.2%	
Registered electors		2,998		
Labour hold		Swing		

=== Mountain Ash East (one seat) ===
Mountain Ash East 1995
Party	Candidate	Votes	%	±%
Plaid Cymru	Pauline Jarman*	764	66.78	
Labour	E. Rose	380	33.22	
Majority		384	33.56	
Turnout		1,144	49.33	
Registered electors		2,319		
Plaid Cymru hold		Swing		

=== Mountain Ash West (two seats) ===
Mountain Ash West 1995
Party	Candidate	Votes	%	±%
Labour	G. Davies	719	27.6%	
Plaid Cymru	C.T. Benney*	709	27.22%	
Plaid Cymru	J.I. Lordac*	670	25.72%	
Labour	I. Jones	507	19.46%	
Turnout		2,605	40.1%	
Registered electors		3,571		
Labour gain from Plaid Cymru		Swing		
Plaid Cymru hold		Swing		

=== Penrhiwceiber (two seats) ===
Penrhiwceiber 1995
Party	Candidate	Votes	%	±%
Labour	T. Dower*	1,114		
Plaid Cymru	P.A.M. Butler*	1,032		
Labour	J. Lewis	999		
Plaid Cymru	D.M. Lewis*	792		
Turnout				
Labour win (new seat)				
Plaid Cymru win (new seat)				

=== Pentre (two seats) ===
Pentre 1995
Party	Candidate	Votes	%	±%
Labour	J. Jenkins	1,177		
Labour	D. Thomas	1,083		
Plaid Cymru	R. Davey	674		
Plaid Cymru	M. Davey	623		
Turnout				
Labour win (new seat)				
Labour win (new seat)				

=== Penygraig (two seats) ===
Penygraig 1995
Party	Candidate	Votes	%	±%
Plaid Cymru	Leanne Wood	1,427		
Labour	B. Rowland*	1,204		
Labour	D.M. Davies*	1,135		
Plaid Cymru	D.J. Davies	1,071		
Turnout				
Plaid Cymru win (new seat)				
Labour win (new seat)				

=== Penywaun (one seat) ===
Penywaun 1995
Party	Candidate	Votes	%	±%
Labour	D. Barnsley*	833		
Plaid Cymru	G.R. Benney	205		
Majority				
Turnout				
Labour win (new seat)				

=== Pontyclun (one seat) ===
Pontyclun 1995
Party	Candidate	Votes	%	±%
Plaid Cymru	Jonathan Huish*	585		
Labour	Mike .A. Hayes	551		
Independent Plaid	Gordon Norman	523		
Majority				
Turnout				
Plaid Cymru win (new seat)				

=== Pontypridd (one seat) ===
Pontypridd 1995
Party	Candidate	Votes	%	±%
Labour	P.G. James	753		
Plaid Cymru	Clayton F. Jones*	530		
Majority				
Turnout				
Labour win (new seat)				

=== Porth (two seats) ===
Porth 1995
Party	Candidate	Votes	%	±%
Labour	N.G. Stonelake*	1,274		
Labour	L.J. Rees	1,232		
Plaid Cymru	M. Jenkins*	749		
Green	C. Jakeway	274		
Turnout				
Labour win (new seat)				
Labour win (new seat)				

=== Rhigos (one seat) ===
Rhigos 1995
Party	Candidate	Votes	%	±%
Plaid Cymru	R. Moses*	612		
Labour	J.B. Price	204		
Majority				
Turnout				
Plaid Cymru win (new seat)				

=== Rhondda (two seats) ===
Rhondda 1995
Party	Candidate	Votes	%	±%
Labour	G.J. Beard	1,035		
Labour	W.J. Williams	943		
Plaid Cymru	R.M. James	535		
Plaid Cymru	C.J. Pritchard	423		
Liberal Democrats	R.M. Deacon	241		
Turnout				
Labour win (new seat)				
Labour win (new seat)				

=== Rhydfelen Central / Ilan (one seat) ===
Rhydfelen Central / Ilan 1995
Party	Candidate	Votes	%	±%
Labour	Henry J. Cox*	697		
Independent	V.J. Thomas	184		
Plaid Cymru	W.J. Daniel	90		
Majority				
Turnout				
Labour win (new seat)				

=== Rhydfelen Lower (one seat) ===
Rhydfelen Lower 1995
Party	Candidate	Votes	%	±%
Labour	W. John Chessman	443		
Independent Labour	I. Thomas	108		
Plaid Cymru	A, Carter*	48		
Majority				
Turnout				
Labour win (new seat)				

=== Taffs Well (one seat) ===
Taffs Well 1995
Party	Candidate	Votes	%	±%
Labour	Jeff .D. Lintern	845		
Plaid Cymru	J.E. Williams	615		
Majority				
Turnout				
Labour win (new seat)				

=== Talbot Green (one seat) ===
Talbot Green 1995
Party	Candidate	Votes	%	±%
Labour	Colin .R. Thorngate	342		
Plaid Cymru	Wayne Owen	255		
Liberal Democrats	M.K. Marchant	244		
Majority				
Turnout				
Labour win (new seat)				

=== Tonteg (two seats) ===
The boundaries were identical to those of the same ward on the previous Taff Ely Borough Council.

Tonteg 1995
Party	Candidate	Votes	%	±%
Labour	W.John David	923	27.84%	
Labour	Mary Lloyd*	901	27.18%	
Plaid Cymru	D.E. Jones	776	23.41%	
Plaid Cymru	D.R. Reilly	715	21.57%	
Majority		125	3.77%	
Turnout		3315	100%	
Labour hold		Swing		
Labour win (new seat)				

=== Tonypandy (one seat) ===
Tonypandy 1995
Party	Candidate	Votes	%	±%
Labour	A. Edwards*	778		
Independent Labour	D. Morgan*	501		
Plaid Cymru	S. Morris	332		
Green	L. Thomas	43		
Majority				
Turnout				
Labour win (new seat)				

=== Tonyrefail East (two seats) ===
Tonyrefail East 1995
Party	Candidate	Votes	%	±%
Labour	Russel Roberts*	1,186		
Labour	R. B. McDonald*	1,038		
Residents	J.R. Hughes	505		
Turnout				
Labour win (new seat)				
Labour win (new seat)				

=== Tonyrefail West (one seat) ===
Tonyrefail West 1995
Party	Candidate	Votes	%	±%
Labour	D.McDonald	932		
Residents	J.R. Hughes	505		
Majority				
Turnout				
Labour win (new seat)				

=== Trallwn (one seat) ===
Trallwn 1995
Party	Candidate	Votes	%	±%
Labour	Allen .W. Bevan	803		
Liberal Democrats	A. Southgate	508		
Majority				
Turnout				
Labour win (new seat)				

=== Trealaw (one seat) ===
Trealaw 1995
Party	Candidate	Votes	%	±%
Labour	W.J. Murphy*	1,075		
Plaid Cymru	D.M. James	280		
Majority				
Turnout				
Labour win (new seat)				

=== Trefforest (one seat) ===
Trefforest 1995
Party	Candidate	Votes	%	±%
Labour	L.S. Whitehead	494		
Plaid Cymru	A.W. Richards	402		
Independent	A.O. Otley*	220		
Majority				
Turnout				
Labour win (new seat)				

=== Treherbert (two seats) ===
Treherbert 1995
Party	Candidate	Votes	%	±%
Plaid Cymru	Geraint Rhys Davies*	1,487		
Labour	R.J. Bundock	1,371		
Plaid Cymru	D.H. Rees*	1,357		
Labour	M.A. Phillips	1,311		
Green	K.G. Morris	101		
Turnout				
Plaid Cymru win (new seat)				
Labour win (new seat)				

=== Treorchy (three seats) ===
Treorchy 1995
Party	Candidate	Votes	%	±%
Labour	K. Winter	2,036		
Labour	D.M. Lewis*	1,704		
Labour	M. Williams*	1,679		
Plaid Cymru	P.J. Jones	1,497		
Plaid Cymru	L. Jones*	1,369		
Plaid Cymru	I.M. Price	1,179		
Green	Kevin Jakeway	160		
Turnout				
Labour win (new seat)				
Labour win (new seat)				
Labour win (new seat)				

=== Tylorstown (two seats) ===
Tylorstown 1995
Party	Candidate	Votes	%	±%
Labour	D.R. Bevan*	1,324		
Labour	J. Scobie*	1,173		
Plaid Cymru	M.G.H. Williams	472		
Independent Labour	I.M. Jenkins*	405		
Green	J.A. Powderhill	80		
Turnout				
Labour win (new seat)				
Labour win (new seat)				

=== Tyn-y-Nant (one seat) ===
The boundaries were identical to those of the same ward on the previous Taff Ely Borough Council.

Tyn-y-Nant 1995
Party	Candidate	Votes	%	±%
Labour	Clayton .J. Willis	1,018	86.05%	
Plaid Cymru	Diana Watkins	165	13.95%	
Majority		853	72.10%	
Turnout		1183	100%	
Labour hold		Swing		

=== Ynyshir (one seat) ===
Ynyshir 1995
Party	Candidate	Votes	%	±%
Labour	R. Davies*	unopposed		
Labour win (new seat)				
Majority				
Turnout				

=== Ynysybwl (one seat) ===
Ynysybwl 1995
Party	Candidate	Votes	%	±%
Labour	Christine Chapman	696		
Plaid Cymru	G.I. Jones*	695		
Independent	D.S. Breeze*	204		
Majority				
Turnout				
Labour win (new seat)				

=== Ystrad (two seats) ===
Ystrad 1995
Party	Candidate	Votes	%	±%
Plaid Cymru	Jill Evans*	1,656		
Plaid Cymru	Syd Morgan*	1,299		
Labour	I. Brace	1,122		
Labour	R. David	940		
Natural Law	G.B. Duguay	48		
Green	R.K. Greenhill	46		
Turnout				
Plaid Cymru win (new seat)				
Plaid Cymru win (new seat)				
