= 2004 Rhondda Cynon Taf County Borough Council election =

2004 Welsh local government election

Results of the 2004 Rhondda Cynin Taf County Borough Council election

The third election to Rhondda Cynon Taf County Borough Council was held in June 2004. It was preceded by the 1999 election and followed by the 2008 election. On the same day there were elections to the other 21 local authorities in Wales and community councils in Wales.

== Boundary Changes ==
There were no boundary changes at this election.

== Overview ==
All 75 council seats were up for election. Labour regained control of the authority from Plaid Cymru.

Rhondda Cynon Taf County Borough Council election result 2004
Party	Seats	Gains	Losses	Net gain/loss	Seats %	Votes %	Votes	+/−
Labour	57			+31				
Plaid Cymru	13			-25				
Liberal Democrats	2			-2				
Independent	2			-4				
Independent Labour	1			0				
Conservative	0							
Green	0							

== Ward results ==
=== Aberaman North (two seats) ===
Aberaman North 2004
Party	Candidate	Votes	%	±%
Labour	Anthony Christopher*	1,104		
Labour	Linda De Vet	940		
Plaid Cymru	I. Bowdich	454		
Turnout			41.6	−6.7
Labour hold		Swing		
Labour hold		Swing		

=== Aberaman South (two seats) ===
Aberaman South 2004
Party	Candidate	Votes	%	±%
Labour	Anita Calvert	781		
Labour	John Oliver	776		
Plaid Cymru	B. John Walter Codd*	571		
Plaid Cymru	Julie P. Williams*	566		
Turnout			45.9	−6.3
Labour gain from Plaid Cymru		Swing		
Labour gain from Plaid Cymru		Swing		

=== Abercynon (two seats) ===
Abercynon 2004
Party	Candidate	Votes	%	±%
Labour	Albert L. Davies*	1,090		
Independent Labour	Stuart G. Gregory*	861		
Labour	G. Taylor	427		
Plaid Cymru	S. Williams	332		
Green	John Matthews	119		
Green	S. Matthews	101		
Liberal Democrats	S. Thorton	84		
Turnout			39.4	−32.2
Labour hold		Swing		
Independent Labour hold		Swing		

=== Aberdare East (two seats) ===
Aberdare East 2004
Party	Candidate	Votes	%	±%
Labour	Shah M. Imtiaz*	1,314		
Labour	Michael Forey*	1,305		
Plaid Cymru	M. Davies	578		
Plaid Cymru	G. Benney	511		
Turnout			42.5	
Labour hold		Swing		
Labour hold		Swing		

=== Aberdare West, Llwydcoed (three seats) ===
Aberdare West, Llwydcoed 2004
Party	Candidate	Votes	%	±%
Labour	Ann Crimmings	1,301		
Labour	P. David	1,191		
Plaid Cymru	W. John Daniel*	1,137		
Plaid Cymru	Elizabeth Walters*	1,060		
Labour	J. Elliott	980		
Plaid Cymru	R. Davies	968		
Turnout			35.3	
Labour gain from Plaid Cymru		Swing		
Labour gain from Plaid Cymru		Swing		
Plaid Cymru hold		Swing		

=== Beddau (one seat) ===
Beddau 2004
Party	Candidate	Votes	%	±%
Labour	Daniel I. Williams*	426	46.8	
Plaid Cymru	S. Assirati	221	24.3	
Independent	L. Channon	174	19.1	
Liberal Democrats	A. Denton	89	9.8	
Majority			22.5	
Turnout			31.5	
Labour hold		Swing		

=== Brynna (one seat) ===
Brynna 2004
Party	Candidate	Votes	%	±%
Independent	Roger Turner	606	58.1	
Labour	J. Bowman	371	35.6	
Plaid Cymru	C. Willis	66	6.3	
Majority			22.5	
Turnout			42.8	
Independent hold		Swing		

=== Church Village (one seat) ===
Church Village 2004
Party	Candidate	Votes	%	±%
Labour	Graham Stacey*	580	60.9	+8.8
Plaid Cymru	D. Lewis	373	39.1	−8.8
Majority			21.8	
Turnout			35.9	−10.8
Labour hold		Swing		

=== Cilfynydd (one seat) ===
Cilfynydd 2004
Party	Candidate	Votes	%	±%
Liberal Democrats	Steve Belzak*	300	36.6	−5.4
Labour	W. Leyshon	215	26.1	−8.1
Independent	B. Morgan	203	24.8	+24.8
Plaid Cymru	G.R. Davies	101	12.3	−11.3
Majority			10.4	
Turnout			42.3	
Liberal Democrats hold		Swing		

=== Cwmbach (one seat) ===
Cwmbach 2004
Party	Candidate	Votes	%	±%
Labour	I. Jones	649	60.4	+5.7
Plaid Cymru	G. Bowen	426	39.6	−5.7
Majority			20.8	
Turnout			37.5	
Labour hold		Swing		

=== Cwm Clydach (one seat) ===
Roberts had been elected as a Plaid Cymru candidate but subsequently joined the Liberal Democrats.

Cwm Clydach 2004
Party	Candidate	Votes	%	±%
Labour	Mark Norris	362	42.0	
Liberal Democrats	Karen Roberts*	221	25.7	
RPP	L. Gregory	152	17.7	
Plaid Cymru	C. Baily	126	14.6	−54.3
Majority			16.4	
Turnout			44.7	
Labour gain from Plaid Cymru		Swing		

=== Cymmer (two seats) ===
Cymmer 2004
Party	Candidate	Votes	%	±%
Labour	Y. Caple*	1,020		
Labour	E. Davies*	778		
Plaid Cymru	B. Evans	422		
Green	K. Jakeway	245		
Turnout			36.6	
Labour hold		Swing		
Labour hold		Swing		

=== Ferndale (two seats) ===
Ferndale 2004
Party	Candidate	Votes	%	±%
Labour	Annette Davies*	1,004		
Labour	Ceri Jones	901		
Plaid Cymru	A. Edwards	397		
Plaid Cymru	V. Thomas*	370		
Turnout			46.3	
Labour hold		Swing		
Labour gain from Plaid Cymru		Swing		

=== Gilfach Goch (one seat) ===
Gilfach Goch 2004
Party	Candidate	Votes	%	±%
Labour	Aurfron Roberts*	752	68.0	+3.6
Independent	G. Jury	296	26.8	−8.8
Plaid Cymru	D. Morris	58	5.2	+5.2
Majority			41.2	
Turnout			49.7	
Labour hold		Swing		

=== Glyncoch (one seat) ===
Glyncoch 2004
Party	Candidate	Votes	%	±%
Labour	J.G. Burford*	428	70.4	
Plaid Cymru	R. Jones	119	19.6	
Liberal Democrats	D. Mason	61	10.0	
Majority			50.8	
Turnout			34.5	
Labour hold		Swing		

=== Graig (one seat) ===
Graig 2004
Party	Candidate	Votes	%	±%
Labour	Joyce Cass*	394	60.1	
Liberal Democrats	L. Dillon	108	16.5	
Independent	R.G. Fox	108	16.5	
Plaid Cymru	A. Cotton	46	7.0	
Majority			43.6	
Turnout			44.7	
Labour hold		Swing		

=== Hawthorn (one seat) ===
Hawthorn 2004
Party	Candidate	Votes	%	±%
Labour	Teressa Bates	473	58.0	
Plaid Cymru	P. Nicholls-Jones	343	42.0	
Majority			16.0	
Turnout			31.8	
Labour hold		Swing		

=== Hirwaun (one seat) ===
Hirwaun 2004
Party	Candidate	Votes	%	±%
Labour	W.A. Myring	624	45.2	+15.0
Plaid Cymru	L.M. Lewis*	412	39.8	−15.0
Majority			20.4	
Turnout			38.5	
Labour gain from Plaid Cymru		Swing		

=== Llanharan (one seat) ===
Llanharan 2004
Party	Candidate	Votes	%	±%
Labour	Geraint Hopkins	458	51.0	+11.2
Independent	D. Davies	256	28.5	+28.5
Plaid Cymru	K. Davies	184	20.5	−22.1
Majority			22.5	
Turnout			38.9	
Labour gain from Plaid Cymru		Swing		

=== Llanharry (one seat) ===
Llanharry 2004
Party	Candidate	Votes	%	±%
Plaid Cymru	V. Williams	477	64.2	−11.5
Labour	C. Hanagan	428	47.3	+11.5
Majority			16.9	
Turnout			40.3	
Plaid Cymru hold		Swing		

=== Llantrisant (one seat) ===
Llantrisant 2004
Party	Candidate	Votes	%	±%
Labour	Glynne Holmes	715	55.3	+21.1
Plaid Cymru	W. Owen	577	44.7	−21.1
Majority			10.6	
Turnout			40.3	
Labour gain from Plaid Cymru		Swing		

=== Llantwit Fardre (two seats) ===
Llantwit Fardre 2004
Party	Candidate	Votes	%	±%
Plaid Cymru	B.P. Channon*	653		
Plaid Cymru	D.R. Watkins*	575		
Labour	J. Bunnage	557		
Independent	L. Gelsei	473		
Labour	D.F. Stone	466		
Turnout			36.3	
Plaid Cymru hold		Swing		
Plaid Cymru hold		Swing		

=== Llwynypia (one seat) ===
Llwynypia 2004
Party	Candidate	Votes	%	±%
Labour	Sylvia Jones	317	47.3	+8.6
Plaid Cymru	P. Lewis*	177	26.4	−34.9
RRP	P. Margery	126	18.8	
Liberal Democrats	S. Jones	50	7.5	
Majority			20.9	
Turnout			44.4	
Labour gain from Plaid Cymru		Swing		

=== Maerdy (one seat) ===
Maerdy 2004
Party	Candidate	Votes	%	±%
Labour	K. Williams	697	64.8	+24.3
Plaid Cymru	Gerwyn Evans	378	35.2	−24.3
Majority			29.6	
Turnout			35.2	
Labour gain from Plaid Cymru		Swing		

=== Mountain Ash East (one seat) ===
Mountain Ash East 2004
Party	Candidate	Votes	%	±%
Plaid Cymru	Pauline Jarman*	504	78.3	−20.4
Labour	S. Evans	350	40.2	+18.5
Communist	N. Maskell	17	2.0	+2.0
Majority			38.1	
Turnout			42.2	
Plaid Cymru hold		Swing		

=== Mountain Ash West (two seats) ===
Mountain Ash West 2004
Party	Candidate	Votes	%	±%
Labour	J. Davies	749		
Labour	Andrew Morgan	724		
Plaid Cymru	C.T. Benney*	472		
Plaid Cymru	A. Davies*	455		
Turnout			43.4	
Labour gain from Plaid Cymru		Swing		
Labour gain from Plaid Cymru		Swing		

=== Penrhiwceiber (two seats) ===
Penrhiwceiber 2004
Party	Candidate	Votes	%	±%
Labour	Jane Ward*	875		
Labour	C. Binding	874		
Plaid Cymru	C. Jones	609		
Turnout			36.2	
Labour hold		Swing		
Labour gain from Plaid Cymru		Swing		

=== Pentre (two seats) ===
Pentre 2004
Party	Candidate	Votes	%	±%
Labour	E. Jenkins*	1,066		
Labour	J. Jenkins	877		
Plaid Cymru	L. Jones*	605		
Plaid Cymru	Maureen Weaver	523		
Turnout			43.7	
Labour hold		Swing		
Labour gain from Plaid Cymru		Swing		

=== Penygraig (two seats) ===
Davies had been elected as a Plaid Cymru candidate in 1999.

Penygraig 2004
Party	Candidate	Votes	%	±%
Labour	K. Privett	835		
Labour	W. Weeks	802		
Plaid Cymru	C. Hughes*	560		
Plaid Cymru	E. Hughes	377		
Independent	D. Davies*	343		
Turnout			42.7	
Labour gain from Plaid Cymru		Swing		
Labour gain from Plaid Cymru		Swing		

=== Penywaun (one seat) ===
Penywaun 2004
Party	Candidate	Votes	%	±%
Labour	D. Barnsley	281	51.1	+2.3
Plaid Cymru	H. James*	269	48.9	−2.3
Majority			2.2	
Turnout			32.8	
Labour gain from Plaid Cymru		Swing		

=== Pontyclun (two seats) ===
Pontyclun 2004
Party	Candidate	Votes	%	±%
Plaid Cymru	Jonathan Huish*	895		
Plaid Cymru	Merfyn Rea	667		
Labour	D. Hayes	611		
Independent	Gordon Norman*	591		
Labour	D. Henderson	565		
Turnout			43.0	
Plaid Cymru hold		Swing		
Plaid Cymru gain from Independent		Swing		

=== Pontypridd (one seat) ===
Pontypridd 2004
Party	Candidate	Votes	%	±%
Labour	Steve Carter	348	32.5	−7.4
Plaid Cymru	D. O'Farrell*	339	31.7	−16.2
Liberal Democrats	S. Farr	219	20.4	+8.2
Independent	A. Carter	165	15.4	+15.4
Majority			0.8	
Turnout			50.6	
Labour gain from Plaid Cymru		Swing		

=== Porth (two seats) ===
Porth 2004
Party	Candidate	Votes	%	±%
Labour	Margaret Davies	900		
Plaid Cymru	Julie Williams*	830		
Labour	Ken Hopkins	781		
Plaid Cymru	T. O'Neill	739		
Turnout			43.9	
Labour gain from Plaid Cymru		Swing		
Plaid Cymru hold		Swing		

=== Rhigos (one seat) ===
The sitting Plaid Cymru member had been returned unopposed in 1999.

Rhigos 2004
Party	Candidate	Votes	%	±%
Labour	G. Thomas	329	51.9	+51.9
Plaid Cymru	R. Moses*	305	48.1	+48.1
Majority		24	3.8	
Turnout			51.4	
Labour gain from Plaid Cymru		Swing		

=== Rhondda (two seats) ===
Rhondda 2004
Party	Candidate	Votes	%	±%
Labour	C. Leyshon*	721		
Labour	R. Smith	632		
Plaid Cymru	W. Daniel	379		
Plaid Cymru	S. Fisher	353		
Liberal Democrats	S. Powell-Agar	214		
Turnout			39.4	
Labour hold		Swing		
Labour gain from Plaid Cymru		Swing		

=== Rhydfelen Central / Ilan (one seat) ===
Rhydfelen Central / Ilan 2004
Party	Candidate	Votes	%	±%
Labour	M. Webber	491	69.8	+27.9
Plaid Cymru	R. Humphreys	212	30.2	+1.0
Majority			39.6	
Turnout			26.1	
Labour hold		Swing		

=== Taffs Well (one seat) ===
Taffs Well 2004
Party	Candidate	Votes	%	±%
Plaid Cymru	A. Hobson*	551	54.6	−7.6
Labour	T. Williams	425	42.1	+3.4
Majority			12.5	−8.1
Turnout			40.2	−6.8
Plaid Cymru hold		Swing		

=== Talbot Green (one seat) ===
Talbot Green 2004
Party	Candidate	Votes	%	±%
Independent	P. Baccara	684	75.5	
Labour	J. Bishop	116	12.8	−3.3
Plaid Cymru	J. Jones	106	11.7	−10.2
Majority			62.7	
Turnout			49.5	
Independent hold		Swing		

=== Tonteg (two seats) ===
Tonteg 2004
Party	Candidate	Votes	%	±%
Labour	R. Butler	831		
Labour	W.J. David*	807		
Plaid Cymru	J. Bunn*	537		
Plaid Cymru	C. Jones	396		
Turnout			42.7	
Labour gain from Plaid Cymru		Swing		
Labour hold		Swing		

=== Tonypandy (one seat) ===
The retiring member had defected from Plaid Cymru to the Liberal Democrats since 1999.

Tonypandy 2004
Party	Candidate	Votes	%	±%
Labour	C. Middle	594	53.2	+17.6
Plaid Cymru	C. Ludlow	228	20.4	−31.9
Liberal Democrats	K. Jones*	188	12.0	+4.8
RRP	K. Dickenson	107	9.6	+9.6
Majority			32.8	
Turnout			46.1	
Labour gain from Plaid Cymru		Swing		

=== Tonyrefail East (two seats) ===
Tonyrefail East 2004
Party	Candidate	Votes	%	±%
Labour	R. B. McDonald*	783		
Labour	R. Roberts*	769		
Plaid Cymru	P. Doyle	548		
Plaid Cymru	Danny Grehan	509		
Turnout			36.3	
Labour hold		Swing		
Labour hold		Swing		

=== Tonyrefail West (one seat) ===
Tonyrefail West 2004
Party	Candidate	Votes	%	±%
Labour	E. Hanagan*	808	74.7	−5.6
Plaid Cymru	D. Watkins	274	25.3	+25.3
Majority			49.4	−11.2
Turnout			28.8	−5.0
Labour hold		Swing		

=== Trallwn (one seat) ===
Trallwn 2004
Party	Candidate	Votes	%	±%
Liberal Democrats	Mike Powell	597	51.4	−1.8
Labour	A.W. Bevan	339	29.2	−1.1
Plaid Cymru	C. Gregory	225	16.5	+2.9
Majority			22.2	−0.7
Turnout			42.1	−9.3
Liberal Democrats hold		Swing		

=== Trealaw (one seat) ===
Trealaw 2004
Party	Candidate	Votes	%	±%
Labour	S. Carnell	636	50.0	+11.3
Plaid Cymru	R. Winter*	414	33.1	−8.0
RRP	J. Gregory	211	16.9	+16.9
Majority			16.9	
Turnout			46.4	+2.1
Labour gain from Plaid Cymru		Swing		

=== Treforest (one seat) ===
Treforest 2004
Party	Candidate	Votes	%	±%
Plaid Cymru	Geraint Day	246	36.6	+7.0
Liberal Democrats	A. Southgate	228	33.9	+10.0
Labour	J. Brookman	198	29.5	−6.0
Majority			2.7	
Turnout			29.2	−6.3
Plaid Cymru gain from Labour		Swing		

=== Treherbert (two seats) ===
Treherbert 2004
Party	Candidate	Votes	%	±%
Labour	K. Morgan	1.074		
Labour	D. Williams	1.065		
Plaid Cymru	Geraint Rhys Davies*	1,063		
Plaid Cymru	L. Jones*	965		
Turnout			54.3	
Labour gain from Plaid Cymru		Swing		
Labour gain from Plaid Cymru		Swing		

=== Treorchy (three seats) ===
Treorchy 2004
Party	Candidate	Votes	%	±%
Plaid Cymru	Cennard Davies*	1,519		
Plaid Cymru	E. Hancock*	1,463		
Labour	T. Haskins	1,335		
Labour	M. Williams	1,290		
Plaid Cymru	R. Knape	1,222		
Labour	D.M. Lewis	1,136		
Turnout			51.5	
Plaid Cymru hold		Swing		
Plaid Cymru hold		Swing		
Labour gain from Plaid Cymru		Swing		

=== Tylorstown (two seats) ===
Tylorstown 2004
Party	Candidate	Votes	%	±%
Labour	D.R. Bevan*	1,038		
Labour	L. Adams	859		
Plaid Cymru	M. Brittain*	380		
Independent	J. Lewis	317		
Turnout			48.6	−5.3
Labour hold		Swing		
Labour gain from Plaid Cymru		Swing		

=== Tyn-y-Nant (one seat) ===
Tyn-y-Nant 2004
Party	Candidate	Votes	%	±%
Labour	C.J. Willis*	675	75.5	−0.2
Plaid Cymru	M. Richards	219	24.5	+0.2
Majority			51.0	−0.5
Turnout			38.5	−5.2
Labour hold		Swing		

=== Ynyshir (one seat) ===
Ynyshir 2004
Party	Candidate	Votes	%	±%
Labour	W. Langford	747	67.0	+4.9
Plaid Cymru	M. Lush	368	33.0	−4.9
Majority			34.0	+9.7
Turnout			48.9	−2.3
Labour hold		Swing		

=== Ynysybwl (one seat) ===
Ynysybwl 2004
Party	Candidate	Votes	%	±%
Plaid Cymru	D. Arnold	508	38.9	−6.8
Labour	G. Crocker	339	26.0	−4.6
Independent	D.S. Breeze	254	19.4	−2.9
Liberal Democrats	D. Smith	205	15.7	+15.7
Majority			12.9	−1.9
Turnout			39.4	−5.2
Plaid Cymru hold		Swing		

=== Ystrad (two seats) ===
Ystrad 2004
Party	Candidate	Votes	%	±%
Labour	P. Cannon	1,140		
Labour	M. Watts	958		
Plaid Cymru	Syd Morgan*	740		
Plaid Cymru	J. Jones*	589		
Independent	R. Davey	257		
Turnout			47.4	−3.9
Labour gain from Plaid Cymru		Swing		
Labour gain from Plaid Cymru		Swing		
