= Aberdare West =

Community in Rhondda Cynon Taf, Wales

Aberdare West: Welsh: Gorllewin Aberdâr
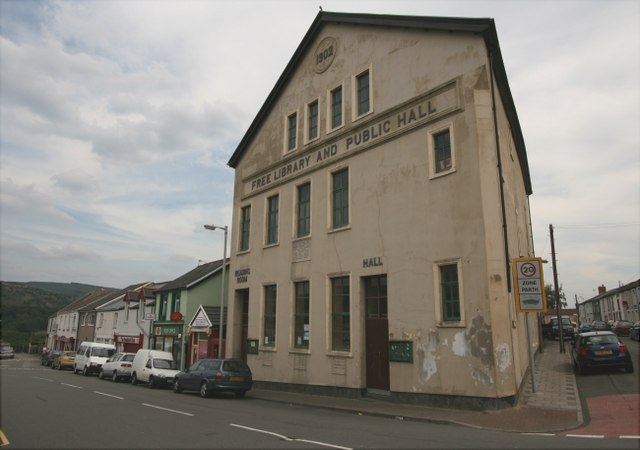
- Trecynon Library and Public Hall
- Population: 7,973
- OS grid reference: SO005025
- Principal area: Rhondda Cynon Taf
- Preserved county: Mid Glamorgan
- Country: Wales
- Sovereign state: United Kingdom
- Post town: ABERDARE
- Postcode district: CF44
- Dialling code: 01685
- Police: South Wales
- Fire: South Wales
- Ambulance: Welsh
- UK Parliament: Cynon Valley
- Senedd Cymru – Welsh Parliament: Cynon Valley
- List of places UK Wales Rhondda Cynon Taf 51°42′45″N 3°28′50″W Map of the community

Aberdare West is a local government community in Rhondda Cynon Taf, Wales. The community was formed in 2016 when the former community of Aberdare was split into two. Neighbouring Aberdare East includes the main town of Aberdare.

== Community ==
The Aberdare West community came into effect on 1 December 2016 following the enactment of The Rhondda Cynon Taf (Communities) Order 2016. The area includes the populated areas of Cwmdare, Trecynon and Robertstown as well as the more rural area surrounding the River Dare, west of Aberdare.

According to the 2021 UK Census Aberdare West had a population of 7,973. 98.3% described their ethnicity as white.

== Governance ==
Aberdare West is included in the electoral ward of Aberdare West/Llwydcoed electing three county councillors to Rhondda Cynon Taf County Borough Council since 1995.
