= Leanne Wood =

Welsh politician (born 1971)

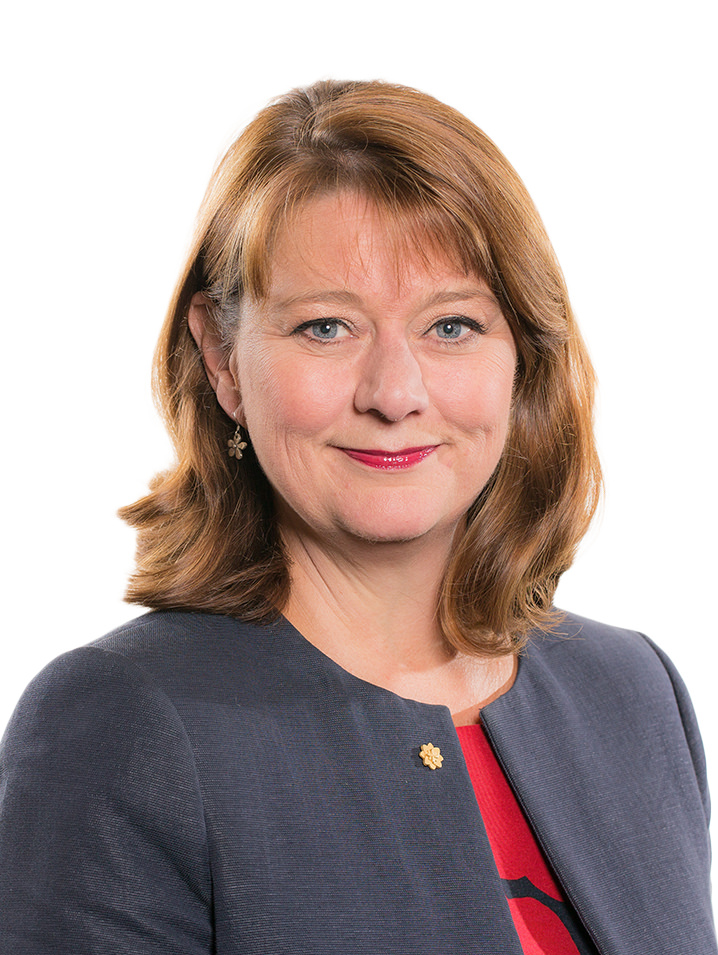
- Official portrait, 2016

Leader of Plaid Cymru
- In office 16 March 2012 – 28 September 2018
- President: The Lord Wigley
- Deputy: Elin Jones (2012–2016)
- Chairman: Helen Mary Jones; Dafydd Trystan Davies; Alun Ffred Jones
- Preceded by: Ieuan Wyn Jones
- Succeeded by: Adam Price

Leader of the Opposition
- In office 6 May 2016 – 14 October 2016
- Monarch: Elizabeth II
- First Minister: Carwyn Jones
- Preceded by: Andrew RT Davies
- Succeeded by: Andrew RT Davies (Note: Vacant: 14 October 2016 – 6 April 2017)

Member of the Senedd (Note: Stylized as "Member of the National Assembly for Wales" from 2003 to 2016)
- In office 6 May 2016 – 6 May 2021
- Preceded by: Leighton Andrews
- Succeeded by: Elizabeth Williams
- Constituency: Rhondda
- In office 1 May 2003 – 6 April 2016
- Preceded by: Pauline Jarman
- Succeeded by: Neil McEvoy
- Constituency: South Wales Central

Personal details
- Born: 13 December 1971 (age 54) Llwynypia, Glamorgan, Wales
- Party: Plaid Cymru
- Other political affiliations: Cymru'n Codi
- Spouse: Ian Brown
- Children: 1
- Education: University of Glamorgan
- Leanne Wood's voice Wood tells Welsh voters to vote for Remain in the 2016 Brexit referendum Recorded 15 June 2016

Leanne Wood (born 13 December 1971) is a Welsh politician who served as the leader of Plaid Cymru from March 2012 to September 2018, and served as a Member of the Senedd (MS) from 2003 to 2021.

Born in the Rhondda, she was elected to the then National Assembly for Wales in 2003, representing South Wales Central until 2016, when she was elected for Rhondda. She lost her seat to Welsh Labour at the 2021 Senedd election.

Ideologically, Wood identifies as a socialist, republican and prominent supporter of Welsh independence. She was the first female leader of Plaid Cymru and the first to learn Welsh as an adult, rather than being brought up speaking Welsh.

== Early life ==
Wood was born in Llwynypia Hospital on 13 December 1971, the daughter of Jeff and Avril (née James) Wood. She was brought up and still lives in the nearby village of Penygraig. She was educated at Tonypandy Comprehensive School (now Tonypandy Community College), and the University of Glamorgan (now the University of South Wales).

== Career ==
From 1997 to 2000, Wood worked with the Mid Glamorgan Probation Service as a probation officer. From 1998 to 2000 she was co-chair of the National Association of Probation Officers. Wood worked as a support worker for Cwm Cynon Women's Aid from 2001 to 2002, where she has been Chair since 2001. Wood lectured in social policy at Cardiff University from 2000, until her election to the National Assembly for Wales in 2003.

== Political career ==
Wood credits her political awakening to reading Marge Piercy's 1976 feminist classic Woman on the Edge of Time, and the 1984–85 UK miners' strike. Her political heroes include Lewis Lewis, one of the leaders of the 1831 Merthyr Rising.

After joining Plaid Cymru in 1991 aged 20, Wood was elected a Councillor for the Penygraig ward on Rhondda Cynon Taf County Borough Council in 1995; she did not recontest the seat in 1999.

She unsuccessfully stood in both the 1997 and 2001 elections to the Parliament of the United Kingdom as a candidate in the Rhondda constituency. After leaving the probation service in 2000, she was Jill Evans MEP's political researcher until 2001. Wood was Chair of Cardiff Stop the War Coalition from 2003 to 2004.

=== Senedd ===
Wood was then elected as a Member of the National Assembly for Wales (AM) in the election of 1 May 2003, representing the South Wales Central region for Plaid. She was the party's Shadow Social Justice Minister between 2003 and 2007.

In December 2004, Wood, a republican, was the first Assembly Member to be ordered out of the chamber, after referring to the Queen as "Mrs Windsor" during a debate. Lord Elis-Thomas, a fellow Plaid Cymru AM and the Presiding Officer, asked Wood to withdraw the remark on the grounds of discourtesy. When Wood refused, she was ordered to leave. She later said: "I don't recognise the Queen ... I don't think I was treated fairly, I don't think it was necessary. I called her that because that's her name."

Wood became Plaid Cymru's sustainability spokesperson from the formation of the One Wales government, a coalition between Labour and Plaid Cymru in July 2007, remaining in the role until the end of Assembly's term in 2011. While in the role, Wood campaigned on green issues, including calling for more land to be made available for growing food.

Wood was arrested on 8 January 2007 for protesting against the UK's Trident nuclear missile programme at Faslane naval base in Scotland.

During the 2011 referendum on extending the National Assembly for Wales's law-making powers, Wood was Plaid Cymru's representative on the all-party Yes for Wales steering group, which campaigned successfully for a 'Yes' vote. She is Chair of the PCS Cross-Party Group in the Welsh Assembly. According to the BBC, Wood's particular areas of interest are: poverty; women's issues; social services; criminal justice; social exclusion; mental health; anti-privatisation; and anti-war. Her Plaid Cymru profile includes her commitment to working "for Wales to become a self-governing decentralist socialist republic".

Upon becoming leader of Plaid in 2012, Wood refused the party leader's allowance to which she was entitled. Upon being re-elected in 2016 and becoming leader of the opposition, she did the same again.

Wood lost her Rhondda seat to Labour's Buffy Williams at the 2021 Senedd election. She described the result as "disappointing", but insisted that Plaid had run a "clean and honest campaign."

=== Scrutiny ===
Between 2009 and 2011, Wood led the exposure of excesses at the Wales Audit Office, while under the control of Jeremy Colman, Auditor General for Wales. Through the Freedom of Information Act, she uncovered a severance package of £750,000, personally authorised by Colman, to the former chief operating officer Anthony Snow. Further scrutiny uncovered more self-authorised expenses, including training costs for Colman and Snow and the £464 cost of hiring a chauffeur-driven Mercedes for Snow to attend a meeting on how to save public money. Colman resigned in February 2010 following an internal investigation, subsequently pleading guilty to possession of child pornography.

Figures obtained by Wood under the Freedom of information Act revealed the level of pay among university vice-chancellors in Wales. Over 270 people were paid over £100,000 per annum by Welsh universities in 2009. It was noted that all Welsh university vice-chancellors received more pay than the £134,723 salary of Carwyn Jones, Wales' First Minister, and some were paid more than the £197,000 entitlement of David Cameron, the prime minister of the United Kingdom.

Information obtained by Wood showed thousands of workers in Wales to have been paid below the Minimum Wage since 2002–03. The underpayments involved over 1000 employers in Wales. The Department for Business, Innovation and Skills subsequently asked HM Revenue and Customs to "press for prosecution where there is clear evidence that the employer has committed an offence", in 2010. No prosecutions had begun by June 2011.

=== Controversies ===
Following her election in 2003 Wood wrote a memo in which she encouraged fellow Plaid AMs to only attend events which will "further the aims" of Plaid Cymru. The same memo encouraged Plaid's regional AMs to base their constituency offices in Plaid target seats and told them that they had the chance to cut back on traditional constituency work and use the cash saved to promote the party.

Following the poisoning of Sergei and Yulia Skripal in March 2018, the British government accused Russia of attempted murder. Wood said, "I don't trust the Tories on anything, so I'm afraid I can't take the Prime Minister's word on this". Wood's statement was criticised by the Welsh Conservative leader Andrew RT Davies as "beyond childish".

After the Equality and Human Rights Commission reported on the UK Labour Party's allegations of antisemitism in October 2020, concluding that the party had in some respects broken equality law, Wood approvingly retweeted two tweets on the subject from Jewish journalist Glenn Greenwald. One of these stated "I've never seen a more flagrant, repellent and cynical exploitation of anti-Semitism in my life than its disgusting use to smear Corbyn because of a lack of alternatives for how to defeat him." Following criticism, Wood later deleted the tweets, whilst a Plaid spokesperson affirmed the party's support for the report.

=== Policy development ===
Wood has produced two major policy documents. In 2008, she published Making Our Communities Safer. Drawing on her four years' previous experience as Plaid Cymru's Social Justice and Regeneration spokesperson and committee member, as well as her previous work as a Probation Officer, it argued for the criminal justice system in Wales to be devolved.

A Greenprint for the Valleys was published in 2011, in which Wood argued for a job creation programme aimed at regenerating the former coalfield areas of the valleys. It contains initiatives including: a Green Construction Skills College; implementing an integrated transport plan for the valleys; creating a land bank for renewable energy and food production; and a programme to renovate heritage buildings. It also suggests providing financial support for home energy efficiency measures and for setting up of green co-operatives.

=== Leader of Plaid Cymru (2012–2018) ===
Wood was elected leader of Plaid Cymru on 15 March 2012, defeating Elin Jones and Dafydd Elis-Thomas. In winning the election she became the first female leader of the party, and the first leader of the party not to speak fluent Welsh although learning the language. Her leadership platform included a call for "real independence — genuinely working to end war, inequality and discrimination", emphasising economic and environmental concerns alongside constitutional reform. Supporters of Wood's leadership campaign included: former Plaid Cymru MP Adam Price; former Plaid Cymru president Dafydd Iwan; and former Cymdeithas yr Iaith chair Menna Machreth.

In June 2012, discussing the 2014 Scottish independence referendum, Wood addressed the concept of 'Britishness'. She explained that feeling British was not dependent on a British state. Wood said she was sure Wales would be an independent sovereign state within a generation, and would exist within a "Neighbourhood of Nations", following the break-up of the United Kingdom.

Wood was one of seven party leaders who took part in a televised debate ahead of the 2015 general election. ICM Research, ComRes and YouGov all took polls immediately afterwards, all three of them putting her in last place. In the second debate on 16 April, Wood challenged Labour leader Ed Miliband to hold an emergency budget if the party won the election, to reverse spending cuts she believes have been particularly harmful in Wales. On 30 April, she took part in Ask Leanne Wood, a 30-minute debate on BBC One Wales in which she answered questions from a live audience, and suggested Plaid Cymru would support a Labour government.

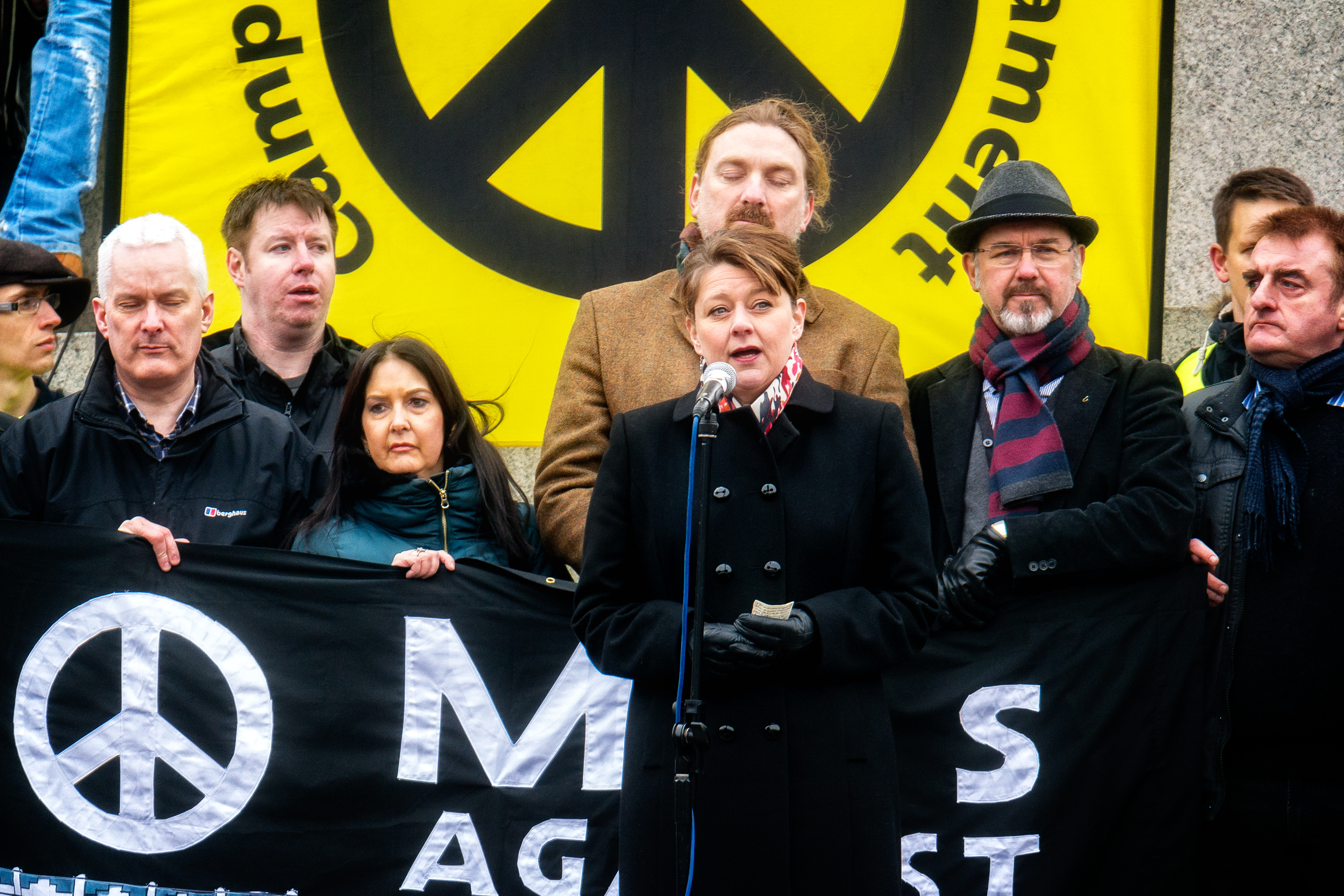
Leanne Wood at the Stop Trident rally in February 2016

In February 2016, Wood was one of the main UK political leaders to take part in an anti-Trident rally in London. In an article Wood co-authored preceding the event alongside two of the rally's other main participants, the Green Party MP, Caroline Lucas, and the Scottish National Party's leader and MSP Nicola Sturgeon, they said they would be marching for "a Britain free from nuclear weapons". The march also included then Labour Party leader Jeremy Corbyn. Wood has criticised Westminster's backing for the replacement of trident, which will cost over £100 billion over its lifetime. She said the money would be far better spent on new and improved public facilities, such as hospitals and schools. During the rally Wood said:

"It is never acceptable, it is never justifiable to unleash weapons of mass destruction on a population. Nuclear weapons belong in the dustbin of history alongside the Cold War."

After the majority of the Welsh – and British – electorate voted to leave the European Union in 2016, Wood proposed that Wales become independent and rejoin the European Union, stating "It is my belief that this independent Wales in a completely different context to last week's referendum would want to be a part of the European Union."

In September 2017, the conservative commentator Iain Dale placed Wood at Number 99 on his list of the '100 most influential people on the Left'.

In July 2018, Adam Price and Rhun ap Iorwerth announced they would challenge Wood's leadership of the party. Following the leadership election in September 2018, Wood lost the election to Price, finishing in third place.

=== Post-leadership ===
She told BBC News that she and Adam Price haven't been friends since he challenged her leadership in 2018. She also said she had opposed his signature policy of a second referendum on EU membership saying: "I really felt very, very strongly that if you ask people a question in a democracy you have to accept the result, no matter how much you don't like it" adding "I spent a lot of time internally within Plaid Cymru trying to persuade people that we needed to accept this result... But it was a debate that people couldn't face I think."

Following the appointment of Prince William as the new Prince of Wales in 2022, Wood voiced opposition to the continued use of the title, tweeting "Wales has no need for a prince".

In 2022, Wood was appointed as a leader of Community Energy Wales.

In April 2025 Wood stated that she would not be a candidate in the 2026 Senedd election, and it was reported in July 2025 that Wood had joined Cymru'n Codi ('Cymru rising') which described itself as an "ecosocialist" group which says it may stand candidates of its own in the 2026 election. Wood clarified that she would be supporting Plaid Cymru and Plaid Cymru candidates in the 2026 election.

== Personal life ==
Wood and her long-term partner, Ian Brown, have a daughter, Cerys Wood. Her former partner, David Ceri Evans, died by suicide in 2002.

Wood is not religious and identifies as a humanist. In 2020, she was appointed a patron of Humanists UK and its Welsh branch, Wales Humanists.

== Elections contested ==
UK Parliament elections

| Date | Constituency | Party | Votes | % | Result |
|---|---|---|---|---|---|
| 1997 | Rhondda | Plaid Cymru | 5,450 | 13.4 | Not elected |
| 2001 | Rhondda | Plaid Cymru | 7,183 | 21.1 | Not elected |

Senedd elections

| Date | Region/Constituency | Party | Votes | % | Results | |
|---|---|---|---|---|---|---|
| 2003 | South Wales Central | Plaid Cymru | 27,956 | 15.44 | Elected | Multi-member party list |
| 2007 | South Wales Central | Plaid Cymru | 32,207 | 15.5 | Elected | Multi-member party list |
| 2011 | South Wales Central | Plaid Cymru | 28,606 | 13.7 | Elected | Multi-member party list |
| 2016 | Rhondda | Plaid Cymru | 11,891 | 50.6 | Elected | Single-member constituency |
| 2021 | Rhondda | Plaid Cymru | 7,335 | 31.3 | Defeated | Single-member constituency |

== Notes ==
Senedd
| Preceded by Leighton Andrews | Member of the Senedd for Rhondda; 2016–2021 | Succeeded by Elizabeth Williams |
| Preceded by Pauline Jarman | Member of the Senedd for South Wales Central; 2003–2016 | Succeeded by Neil McEvoy |
Political offices
| Preceded by Andrew RT Davies | Leader of the Opposition in Wales; 2016–2017 | Succeeded by Andrew RT Davies |
Party political offices
| Preceded by Ieuan Wyn Jones | Leader of Plaid Cymru; 2012–2018 | Succeeded by Adam Price |
