= Leighton Andrews =

Welsh Labour politician (born 1957)

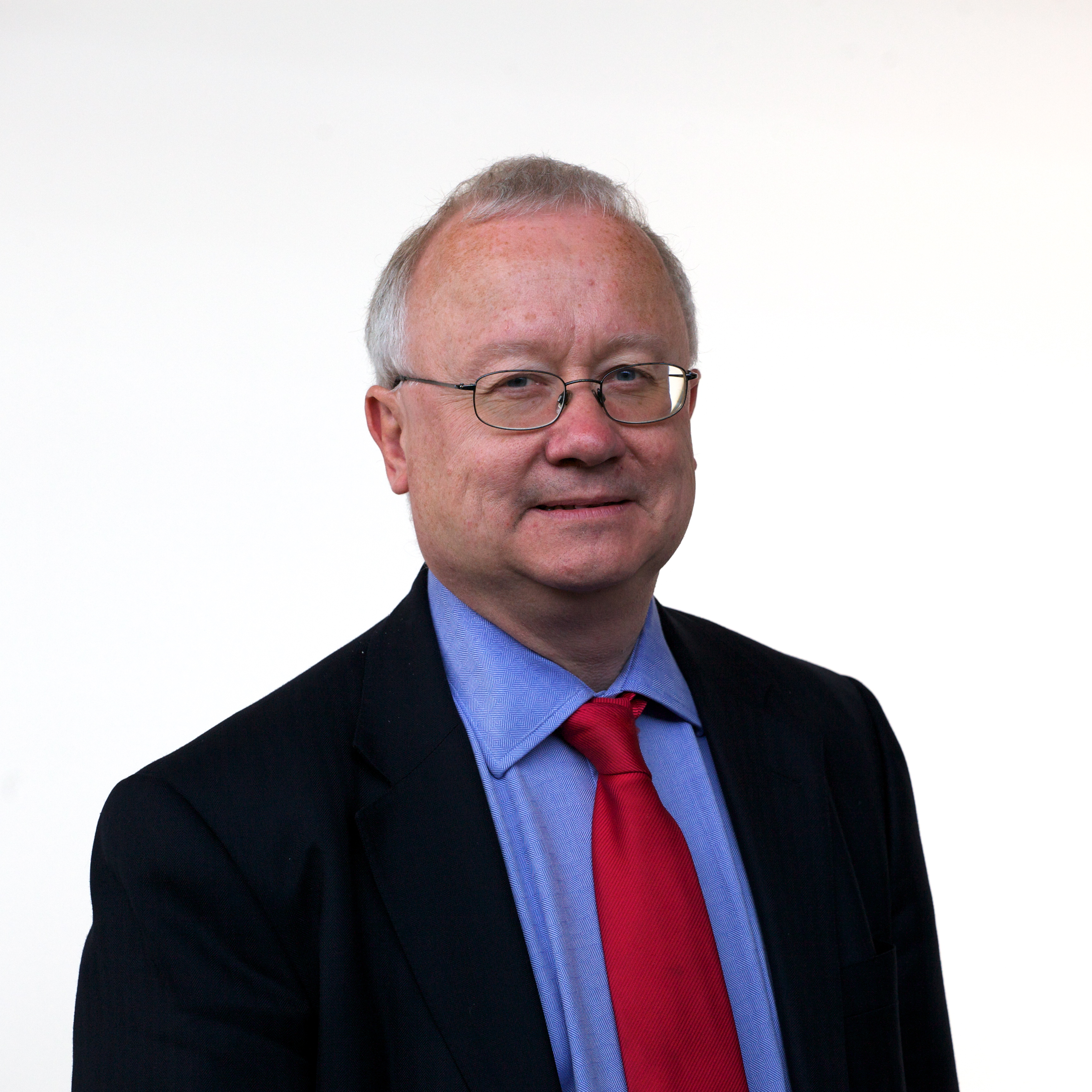

Minister for Public Service
- In office 11 September 2014 – 5 May 2016
- Preceded by: Role Established
- Succeeded by: Role Re-organised

Minister for Education and Skills
- In office 10 December 2009 – 25 June 2013
- First Minister: Carwyn Jones
- Preceded by: Jane Hutt
- Succeeded by: Huw Lewis

Member of the National Assembly for Wales for Rhondda
- In office 1 May 2003 – 5 May 2016
- Preceded by: Geraint Davies
- Succeeded by: Leanne Wood
- Majority: 6,739 (33.6%)

Personal details
- Born: 11 August 1957 (age 69) Cardiff, Wales
- Party: Independent
- Other political affiliations: Labour (former); Liberal (former)
- Spouse: Ann Beynon
- Children: 2
- Education: University of Wales, Bangor, University of Sussex
- Occupation: Professor, Cardiff University.
- Website: www.leightonandrews.live

Leighton Andrews (born 11 August 1957) is a former Welsh Labour politician and academic, who was the National Assembly for Wales member for Rhondda from 2003 to 2016. He was Education Minister from 2009 to 2013, before resigning after an alleged conflict between his own departmental policy and his active campaigning to save a school in his constituency. He was the first Minister to be forced to resign in Wales. In September 2014 he returned to the government as Minister for Public Services, until the 2016 Senedd election, when he lost his seat to Leanne Wood of Plaid Cymru.

He left the Labour Party in 2019, attacking the party's failure to deal with anti-semitism and its attitude to Brexit under Jeremy Corbyn. He sought to rejoin in 2020, but was refused, after openly lending his support to the Green Party of England and Wales at the 2019 European Parliament elections.

== Background and education ==
Andrews was born in Cardiff, and brought up in Barry until the age of 11, when his family moved to Dorset. He holds a BA Honours (English and History) from the University of Wales, Bangor and an MA in History from the University of Sussex. He was a sabbatical officer in the students union at Bangor in 1978. He was a visiting professor at the University of Westminster from 1997 to 2002 and has been an Honorary Professor at Cardiff University since 2004. He was appointed as Professor of Practice in Public Service Leadership and Innovation, Cardiff Business School, in August 2016.

Andrews is married to Ann Beynon, formerly BT Director Wales; the couple have two children.

== Political career ==
Andrews was an active Liberal Party member in the 1970s and 1980s. He was elected as a Union of Liberal Students member of the National Union of Students (NUS) executive in 1979 and stood as the Liberal Alliance candidate for Gillingham in the 1987 General Election at the age of 29. On returning to Wales to live in 1996 he was appointed to the board of Tai Cymru – Housing for Wales by the Conservative Secretary of State for Wales, William Hague.

He was co-founder of the Yes for Wales campaign for the 1997 Welsh devolution referendum. During the referendum campaign he produced a paper with Gareth Hughes, then of the Welsh Federation of Housing Associations (now known as Community Housing Cymru) and now of ITV Wales, arguing that savings could be found to liberate more funding for housing from the Government's proposal to abolish Tai Cymru as part of the devolution settlement.

=== National Assembly for Wales ===
He joined the Labour Party following the successful referendum campaign for a Welsh Assembly. He is the author of Wales Says Yes, a history of that campaign.

In 2002 Andrews was selected to fight Rhondda for Labour, after the party's shock defeat to Plaid Cymru's Geraint Davies at the 1999 Assembly election. Andrews retook the seat, with the highest increase in Labour's vote of any constituency in Wales (+21.1%) and its highest constituency vote.

In his first term as an Assembly Member, he sat on the Economic Development and Transport Committee (later called the Enterprise, Innovation and Networks Committee) (January 2005 – April 2007); Audit Committee (June 2003 – April 2007); Culture, Welsh Language and Sport Committee (June 2003 – November 2005); and Education and Lifelong Learning Committee (June 2003 – January 2005).

Andrews was appointed to the Welsh Assembly Government on 31 May 2007, as a Deputy Minister for Social Justice and Public Service Delivery, with special responsibility for housing. His speech in the Assembly on 27 June set out the broad thrust of the housing agenda which was to form the policy of the new coalition government.

On 19 July 2007 he was appointed as Deputy Minister for Regeneration in the coalition government, where he led the Heads of the Valleys and Mon a Menai programmes, and launched several Strategic Regeneration Areas across Wales. He was also responsible for digital inclusion.

In the autumn of 2009 he was campaign manager for Carwyn Jones' successful campaign to become Welsh Labour Leader. Jones was elected as leader.

Following Carwyn Jones's election as First Minister on 8 December 2009, Andrews was appointed by Jones to the Welsh Assembly Government Cabinet on 10 December as Minister for Children, Education & Lifelong Learning. He became Minister for Education and Skills in the Welsh Government after the 2011 election campaign when Labour won the right to govern alone, with additional responsibility for the Welsh Language. Andrews was forced to resign as Minister in June 2013, when Carwyn Jones told him he had broken the Ministerial Code by campaigning against the closure of Pentre Primary School in his Rhondda constituency.

On the back-benches from July 2013 to September 2014, he sat on the Communities, Equality and Local Government committee and the Health and Social Services committee. After just over a year on the back-benches, he returned to the government on 11 September 2014 as Minister for Public Services, against a background of funding cuts and proposals from the Williams Commission for changes including extensive reform of local government boundaries.

His media and debating skills were recognised in December 2005 when he was named as Best New AM in the ITV Wales Political Awards; and Best Communicator in the BBC Wales AM-PM awards. He was the first politician in Wales to be ITV Wales Politician of the Year on two occasions, in 2011 and 2012, in recognition of his agenda-setting work as Education Minister.

Andrews lost his Assembly seat at the 2016 National Assembly for Wales election when he was defeated by Leanne Wood, the leader of Plaid Cymru. He described his campaign defeat in a post for Labour Uncut. He subsequently made it clear that he would not re-stand for the seat at the next Assembly election in 2021.

==== Burberry campaign ====
On 6 September 2006 Burberry announced the closure of its Treorchy factory. Immediately the GMB union announced a campaign to save the factory, backed by Andrews and local MP Chris Bryant.

The factory closed in March 2007, with the loss of 300 jobs. Though the factory closed, the campaign secured an extended life for its operation, better redundancy terms for the Burberry workers, and a trust fund for the Rhondda worth £150,000 per year over the next ten years. In her review of the year 2007, the Rhondda-born journalist Carolyn Hitt said:

Labour AM Leighton Andrews and MP Chris Bryant fought a passionate campaign to save 300 jobs at the Burberry clothing factory in their Rhondda constituency. But even the added celebrity glitter of Dame Judi Dench, Ioan Gruffudd and Emma Thompson couldn’t persuade the grasping label to stay. The campaign did, however, ensure a better redundancy deal and long-term community fund for the workforce.

BBC Wales named Andrews and Bryant as joint campaigners of the year in the 2007 political awards for their work in the campaign.

=== Minister for Education ===
While Minister for Education, Andrews led a substantial divergence from the Primary and Secondary education policy of his predecessors, instead converging with the policy pursued by the New Labour governments, and his policy is often described as representing a second 'phase' of Welsh education policy.

==== Primary and Secondary Education ====
Andrews' changes in policy were developed as an immediate response to the 2009 PISA results, which showed Welsh schools performing substantially worse in a specific series of Maths, Science and English tests than it had previously. These results have been in decline in Wales, and across the UK, since nation-divided data began in 2006, and this continued under Andrews' tenure.

Andrews was critical of a perceived cultural weakness in the Welsh education system of a lack of self-evaluation and development, to which he attributed Wales poor PISA and educational outcomes. This defined a substantial portion of his approach to policy, including a stronger focus on Assessment outcomes, as well as the use of data to track these outcomes. He re-introduced a number of policies previously scrapped in Wales, including national assessments of pupils ability at various ages, and a form of public-facing school rankings, amid other reforms to school governance and teaching intended to create a sense of 'accountability' within schools. These reforms were explicitly pitched at improving Wales PISA results.

In September 2012, Andrews ordered the remarking of several thousand GCSE English papers in Wales that had been affected by a very late change in the marking scheme. His move was greeted with great relief and enthusiasm by teachers and candidates. However, it drew strong criticism from Michael Gove, who accused Andrews of being 'irresponsible and mistaken'. Andrews subsequently announced that Wales would have an independent exam regulator, Qualifications Wales.

==== Higher education and further education ====
In higher and further education, Andrews pursued a policy of institutional consolidation across both Universities and Colleges. This policy led to the merger of University of Wales Trinity Saint David and Swansea Metropolitan University, and the creation University of South Wales, as a merger of University of Wales, Newport and University of Glamorgan. He had intended that Cardiff Metropolitan University would also join the University of South Wales, but this did not go ahead, after resistance from Cardiff Met. He had further intended for colleges and other post-secondary institutions to be merged in to the University system, forming a new proposed model for post-16 education, but again this was not implemented.

He was a strong proponent of the longstanding policy to merge universities in Wales to establish larger, more stable institutions. This agenda, and his approach to it, proved to be controversial. His campaign opened with a blunt speech to vice-chancellors, whereby he accused them of ignoring the Welsh Assembly Government, and announcing a review into the governance and sustainability of the HE sector. At the time, his statement was met with cautious welcome, particularly from academics. After a scandal involving quality control at the University of Wales, Andrews forced its closure.

In November 2010, Andrews announced that, contrary to the policy of the Conservative/Liberal Democrat coalition in Westminster, Welsh students would not have to pay the uplifted £9000 tuition fees no matter where they studied. This was lated implemented in the 2011-2016 Senedd term.

==== Welsh language strategy ====
A Welsh learner, Andrews published the first Welsh-Medium Education Strategy, legislated to make Welsh Language Education Strategic plans statutory, with a provision for Welsh Ministers to force local authorities to undertake assessments of parental demand for Welsh-medium education, published a new Welsh Language Strategy in 2012, appointed the first Welsh Language Commissioner, created a Welsh language digital technology fund, and set up reviews of the Eisteddfod, Welsh second language education, and Welsh for Adults. In 2013 he was criticised for rejecting many of the recommendations of the commissioner.

==== Resignation ====
Andrews was forced to resign after attending a protest considered by many to be in opposition to his own policy of requiring local authorities to amalgamate schools to reduce surplus places. Andrews later claimed that he was protesting the closure of a primary school in Pentre under this policy because Rhondda Cynon Taf County Borough council had failed to carry out an adequate community impact assessment for the school's closure. After Carwyn Jones refused to support his position, and stated he had broken the Ministerial Code, he resigned on 25 June 2013.

=== Deputy Ministries and Minister for Public Services ===
As Public Services Minister, Andrews took forward the local government reform agenda, building on the Williams Commission proposals, with a White Paper in February 2015, Power to Local People. In June 2015 he published the Welsh Government's preferred option of a map of 8 or 9 local authorities in Wales, and took the first Local Government Bill through the Assembly. In November 2015 he published the draft Local Government Reform and Merger Bill, which was not enacted before the 2016 Assembly elections. Andrews inherited from his predecessor, Lesley Griffiths, a Gender-based violence Bill, and took early steps to rename it to the name under which it was eventually passed into law in 2015.

=== Labour membership ===
In May 2019, Andrews wrote a blog post explaining he had left the Labour Party, amid concerns over leader Jeremy Corbyn's Brexit policy, and his handling of the anti-Semitism crisis in the party, and would be voting for the Green Party of England and Wales in the 2019 European Parliament election in the United Kingdom. He subsequently sought to rejoin the Labour Party to vote for Keir Starmer in the 2020 leadership election. Andrews membership application was rejected on the grounds that he had voted Green in the 2019 European Parliament election, though he claimed this may have actually been linked to his refusal to vote for Rebecca Long-Bailey in the leadership election.

== Professional career ==
- Parliamentary Officer, Age Concern, 1982–84
- UK Campaign Director, UN International Year of Shelter for the Homeless, 1984–87
- Public Affairs Consultant 1988–1993 and 1997–2002
- Head of Public Affairs for the BBC from 1993–96, based in London, responsible for the BBC's relations with the UK Parliament and with the EU institutions
- Lecturer at Cardiff University School of Journalism, Media and Cultural Studies prior to his election to the National Assembly.

Prior to his election to the National Assembly for Wales, Andrews worked in Cardiff University's School of Journalism, Media and Cultural Studies, at which he was an Honorary Professor. After he lost his seat, he returned to Cardiff University, as part of its Business School, as a Professor of Practice in Public Service. He has written frequently on Media and Journalism, particularly broadcasting policy, on Welsh Politics, particularly on the period around the devolution referendums, and on Ministerial power and its use.

== Attitude to devolution ==
Andrews voted 'Yes' in the first referendum on devolution in 1979, his first ever vote. He was one of the founders of the Yes campaign in 1997.

Andrews supported primary law-making powers for the National Assembly for Wales, provided they were approved by the people of Wales in a referendum. He argued at the Welsh Labour Special Conference in September 2004 that this should have been Welsh Labour's response to the Richard Commission, arguing "Are we really going to say that Rhodri Morgan cannot have primary law-making powers when Gerry Adams and the Reverend Ian Paisley can?"

In the autumn of 2010, he was asked by First Minister Carwyn Jones and Deputy First Minister Ieuan Wyn Jones to convene the planning group for the Yes campaign in the successful March 2011 referendum on the Assembly's law-making powers.

== Selected works ==
- Andrews, Leighton (1999). Wales says Yes: the inside story of the Yes for Wales referendum campaign. Seren. ISBN 978-1-85411-253-8.
- Andrews, Leighton (2014). Ministering to Education: A Reformer Reports. Cardigan: Parthian Books. ISBN 978-1909844834.
- Andrews, Leighton (2019). Facebook, the Media and Democracy: Big Tech, Small State?. Abingdon, Oxfordshire: Routledge. ISBN 978-0429881558.
- Andrews, Leighton (2024). Ministerial Leadership: Practice, Performance and Power. Cham, Switzerland: Springer International Publishing AG. ISBN 978-3-031-50007-7.

== Offices held ==
Senedd
Preceded by Geraint Davies	Assembly Member for Rhondda; 2003–2016	Succeeded by Leanne Wood
Political offices
New post	Deputy Minister for Social Justice and Public Service Delivery; 31 May 2007 – 19 July 2007	Succeeded by Jocelyn Davies
Preceded by Huw Lewis	Deputy Minister for Regeneration; 2007 – December 2009	Succeeded by Jocelyn Davies
Preceded by Jane Hutt	Minister for Children, Education and Lifelong Learning; December 2009 – June 2013	Succeeded by Huw Lewis
New post	Minister for Public Services; 2014–2016	post re-organised
