= John Dixon (Welsh politician) =

British politician, born 1951

Andrew John Dixon (born 1951) is a Welsh politician and former member of Plaid Cymru.

He stood in Carmarthen West and South Pembrokeshire at the 2005 General election.

He stood in election for Carmarthen West and South Pembrokeshire constituency in the 2007 National Assembly for Wales election.

John Dixon was born in Cardiff ( Caerdydd ) and now lives in Llanpumsaint in Carmarthenshire. He was educated at Dinas Powys Primary School and Stanwell Comprehensive School in Penarth.

He has spent most of his life working in IT, as a programmer, analyst and manager, for a variety of companies, including working as a freelance Project Manager. He now works as a translator and interpreter from Welsh to English and vice versa.

John Dixon was a councillor for fifteen years, twelve years on the Vale of Glamorgan Borough Council, and fifteen on the Dinas Powys Community Council. Dixon was national treasurer of Plaid Cymru for five years in the 1970s, and held a range of other posts, including "Director of Organisation and National Chair", a post which he held from 1993 to 1994 and again from 2002 to 2010. He stood down from his position as Chair of Plaid Cymru before his term of office had ended, citing the need to "refocus ...on activities for which I get paid" and less on organisational matters. After Dixon failed to be selected as a Plaid Cymru candidate in the 2011 Welsh Assembly elections, he left the party in April 2011.

Party political offices
Preceded by Siân Edwards	Chair of Plaid Cymru; 1992–1994	Succeeded by Jill Evans
Preceded by Elin Jones	Chair of Plaid Cymru; 2002–2010	Succeeded by Gwenllian Lansdown
