= 2008 Rhondda Cynon Taf County Borough Council election =

2008 Welsh local government election

Results of the 2008 Rhondda Cynin Taf County Borough Council election

The fourth election to Rhondda Cynon Taf County Borough Council was held in May 2008. It was preceded by the 2004 election and followed by the 2012 election. On the same day there were elections to the other 21 local authorities in Wales as well as community councils.

== Boundary Changes ==
There were no boundary changes at this election.

== Overview ==
All 75 council seats were up for election. Labour maintained control of the authority.

Rhondda Cynon Taf County Borough Council election result 2004
Party	Seats	Gains	Losses	Net gain/loss	Seats %	Votes %	Votes	+/−
Labour	57			+31				
Plaid Cymru	13			-25				
Liberal Democrats	2			-2				
Independent	2			-4				
Independent Labour	1			0				
Conservative	0				0.0			
Green	0				0.0			

== Ward results ==
=== Aberaman North (two seats) ===
Aberaman North 2008
Party	Candidate	Votes	%	±%
Labour	Anthony Christopher*	1,006		
Labour	Linda De Vet*	940		
Plaid Cymru	Paul Nicholls-Jones	521		
Turnout			41.6	−6.7
Labour hold		Swing		
Labour hold		Swing		

=== Aberaman South (two seats) ===
Aberaman South 2008
Party	Candidate	Votes	%	±%
Plaid Cymru	Howard Davies	819		
Plaid Cymru	H. Williams	775		
Labour	Anita Calvert*	738		
Labour	R. Dalley	724		
Turnout				
Plaid Cymru gain from Labour		Swing		
Plaid Cymru gain from Labour		Swing		

=== Abercynon (two seats) ===
Abercynon 2008
Party	Candidate	Votes	%	±%
Labour	Albert L. Davies*	1,006		
Independent	Stuart G. Gregory*	818		
Labour	T. Luke	487		
Green	John Matthews	371		
Turnout				
Labour hold		Swing		
Independent gain from Independent Labour		Swing		

=== Aberdare East (two seats) ===
Aberdare East 2008
Party	Candidate	Votes	%	±%
Labour	Steve Bradwick*	1,172		
Labour	Michael Forey*	1,152		
Plaid Cymru	David Alun Walters	951		
Turnout				
Labour hold		Swing		
Labour hold		Swing		

=== Aberdare West, Llwydcoed (three seats) ===
Aberdare West, Llwydcoed 2008
Party	Candidate	Votes	%	±%
Plaid Cymru	W. John Daniel*	1,319		
Labour	Ann Crimmings*	1,276		
Plaid Cymru	Elizabeth Walters	1,270		
Labour	P. David*	1,121		
Plaid Cymru	M. Lloyd	1,114		
Labour	J. Davies	1,002		
Turnout			36.9	+1.6
Plaid Cymru hold		Swing		
Labour hold		Swing		
Plaid Cymru gain from Labour		Swing		

=== Beddau (one seat) ===
Beddau 2008
Party	Candidate	Votes	%	±%
Independent	S. Assirati	437	50.2	
Labour	Richard Yeo	433	49.8	
Majority		4	0.4	
Turnout				
Independent gain from Labour		Swing		

=== Brynna (one seat) ===
Brynna 2008
Party	Candidate	Votes	%	±%
Independent	Roger Turner*	Unopposed		
Independent hold		Swing		

=== Church Village (one seat) ===
Church Village 2008
Party	Candidate	Votes	%	±%
Labour	Graham Stacey*	600	58.6	
Plaid Cymru	R. Watkins	424	42.4	
Majority				
Turnout				
Labour hold		Swing		

=== Cilfynydd (one seat) ===
Cilfynydd 2008
Party	Candidate	Votes	%	±%
Liberal Democrats	S. Logan	438		
Labour	Barrie Morgan	318		
Plaid Cymru	R. Davies	71		
Majority				
Turnout				
Liberal Democrats hold		Swing		

=== Cwmbach (one seat) ===
Cwmbach 2004
Party	Candidate	Votes	%	±%
Labour	Jeffrey Alan Elliott	757		
Plaid Cymru	A. Jarman	436		
Majority				
Turnout				
Labour hold		Swing		

=== Cwm Clydach (one seat) ===
Cwm Clydach 2008
Party	Candidate	Votes	%	±%
Labour	Mark Norris*	339	42.0	
Liberal Democrats	Karen Roberts	285		
Plaid Cymru	Heidi Whitter	219		
Majority				
Turnout				
Labour hold		Swing		

=== Cymmer (two seats) ===
Cymmer 2008
Party	Candidate	Votes	%	±%
Labour	E. Davies*	721		
Labour	Margaret Tegg	658		
Plaid Cymru	H. Fisher	652		
Plaid Cymru	T. Richards	622		
Turnout				
Labour hold		Swing		
Labour hold		Swing		

=== Ferndale (two seats) ===
Ferndale 2008
Party	Candidate	Votes	%	±%
Labour	Annette Davies*	895		
Labour	Ceri Jones*	794		
Plaid Cymru	V. Thomas	493		
Turnout			40.7	
Labour hold		Swing		
Labour hold		Swing		

=== Gilfach Goch (one seat) ===
Gilfach Goch 2008
Party	Candidate	Votes	%	±%
Labour	Aurfron Roberts*	Unopposed		
Labour hold		Swing		

=== Glyncoch (one seat) ===
Glyncoch 2008
Party	Candidate	Votes	%	±%
Labour	Doug Williams	Unopposed		
Labour hold		Swing		

=== Graig (one seat) ===
Graig 2008
Party	Candidate	Votes	%	±%
Labour	Joyce Cass*	339	59.2	
Independent	R.G. Fox	140	24.4	
Plaid Cymru	J. Hughes	65	11.3	
Liberal Democrats	G. Summers	21	3.7	
TUSC	Glyn Matthews	8	1.4	
Majority				
Turnout			33,1	
Labour hold		Swing		

=== Hawthorn (one seat) ===
Hawthorn 2008
Party	Candidate	Votes	%	±%
Labour	Teressa Bates*	434	46.6	
Liberal Democrats	A. Denton	263	28,2	
Plaid Cymru	S. Fisher	234	25.1	
Majority				
Turnout			34.1	
Labour hold		Swing		

=== Hirwaun (one seat) ===
Hirwaun 2008
Party	Candidate	Votes	%	±%
Plaid Cymru	Karen Roberts	804	62.6	
Labour	W.A. Myring*	441	34.3	+15.0
Communist	C. Griffiths	40	3.1	41.7
Majority				
Turnout			41.7	
Plaid Cymru gain from Labour		Swing		

=== Llanharan (one seat) ===
Llanharan 2008
Party	Candidate	Votes	%	±%
Labour	Geraint Hopkins*	389	39.0	−12.0
Independent	D. Davies	377	37.8	+9.3
Plaid Cymru	J. Dilworth	232	23.2	
Majority				
Turnout			34.2	
Labour hold		Swing		

=== Llanharry (one seat) ===
Llanharry 2008
Party	Candidate	Votes	%	±%
Plaid Cymru	V. Williams	474	53.1	
Labour	N. Evans	419	46.9	
Majority				
Turnout			34.1	
Plaid Cymru hold		Swing		

=== Llantrisant (one seat) ===
Llantrisant 2004
Party	Candidate	Votes	%	±%
Labour	Glynne Holmes	823	60.1	
Plaid Cymru	C. Willis	547	39.9	
Majority				
Turnout				
Labour hold		Swing		

=== Llantwit Fardre (two seats) ===
One of the councillors elected for Plaid in 2004 had defected to Labour.

Llantwit Fardre 2008
Party	Candidate	Votes	%	±%
Conservative	Joel James	539		
Independent	Margaret Burtonwood	500		
Plaid Cymru	J. Jones	491		
Plaid Cymru	D.R. Watkins*	466		
Labour	B.P. Channon*	440		
Labour	D.F. Stone	404		
Turnout			35.3	−1.0
Conservative gain from Plaid Cymru		Swing		
Independent gain from Plaid Cymru		Swing		

=== Llwynypia (one seat) ===
Llwynypia 2008
Party	Candidate	Votes	%	±%
Labour	Sylvia Jones*	312		
Plaid Cymru	T. Coombe	146		
Independent	J. Gregory	142		
Independent	J. Davies	100		
Majority				
Turnout				
Labour hold		Swing		

=== Maerdy (one seat) ===
Maerdy 2008
Party	Candidate	Votes	%	±%
Plaid Cymru	Gerwyn Evans	545		
Labour	K. Williams*	517		
Majority				
Turnout				
Plaid Cymru gain from Labour		Swing		

=== Mountain Ash East (one seat) ===
Mountain Ash East 2008
Party	Candidate	Votes	%	±%
Plaid Cymru	Pauline Jarman*	745		
Labour	J. Eliot	263		
Majority				
Turnout				
Plaid Cymru hold		Swing		

=== Mountain Ash West (two seats) ===
Mountain Ash West 2008
Party	Candidate	Votes	%	±%
Labour	Andrew Morgan*	882		
Labour	Simon Lloyd	723		
Plaid Cymru	M. Davies	466		
Turnout				
Labour hold		Swing		
Labour hold		Swing		

=== Penrhiwceiber (two seats) ===
Penrhiwceiber 2008
Party	Candidate	Votes	%	±%
Labour	Adam Fox	971		
Labour	Jane Ward*	870		
Plaid Cymru	L. Warner	642		
Turnout				
Labour hold		Swing		
Labour hold		Swing		

=== Pentre (two seats) ===
Pentre 2008
Party	Candidate	Votes	%	±%
Labour	E. Jenkins*	1,001		
Labour	J. Jenkins*	809		
Plaid Cymru	Maureen Weaver	770		
Turnout			40.0	
Labour hold		Swing		
Labour hold		Swing		

=== Penygraig (two seats) ===
Penygraig 2008
Party	Candidate	Votes	%	±%
Labour	Ken Privett*	763		
Labour	Dennis Weeks*	757		
Plaid Cymru	Alison Jones	693		
Turnout			33.5	
Labour hold		Swing		
Labour hold		Swing		

=== Penywaun (one seat) ===
Penywaun 2008
Party	Candidate	Votes	%	±%
Labour	G. Roberts	409		
Plaid Cymru	Paul James*	331		
Majority				
Turnout				
Labour hold		Swing		

=== Pontyclun (two seats) ===
Pontyclun 2008
Party	Candidate	Votes	%	±%
Plaid Cymru	Jonathan Huish*	1,013		
Plaid Cymru	Merfyn Rea*	841		
Independent	Gordon Norman	665		
Labour	M. Hayes	515		
UKIP	David Bevan	354		
Labour	C. Williams	303		
Turnout				
Plaid Cymru hold		Swing		
Plaid Cymru hold		Swing		

=== Pontypridd (one seat) ===
Pontypridd 2008
Party	Candidate	Votes	%	±%
Liberal Democrats	S. Farr	397		
Plaid Cymru	D. O'Farrell	379		.2
Labour	Steve Carter*	353		
Majority				
Turnout				
Liberal Democrats gain from Labour		Swing		

=== Porth (two seats) ===
Porth 2008
Party	Candidate	Votes	%	±%
Labour	Margaret Davies*	838		
Plaid Cymru	Julie Williams*	819		
Labour	G. Abbott	796		
Plaid Cymru	Alun Cox	793		
Turnout				
Labour hold		Swing		
Plaid Cymru hold		Swing		
