= 1999 Rhondda Cynon Taf County Borough Council election =

1999 Welsh local government election

The second election to Rhondda Cynon Taf County Borough Council was held on 6 May 1999. It was preceded by the 1995 election and followed by the 2004 election. On the same day there were elections to the other 21 local authorities in Wales and community councils in Wales and the first elections to the National Assembly for Wales were held.

== Boundary Changes ==
An additional seat was created in the Pontyclun ward while the Rhydfelen Lower ward was abolished.

== Overview ==
All 75 council seats were up for election. Plaid Cymru won control of the authority from Labour.

Rhondda Cynon Taf County Borough Council election result 1999
Party	Seats	Gains	Losses	Net gain/loss	Seats %	Votes %	Votes	+/−
Labour	26							
Conservative	0							
Liberal Democrats	4							
Plaid Cymru	38							
Independent	0							
Green	0							
Independent Labour								
Other parties	7							

== Ward results ==
=== Aberaman North (two seats) ===
Aberaman North 1999
Party	Candidate	Votes	%	±%
Labour	Anthony Christopher*	1,106		
Labour	Bryan Fitzgerald*	926		
Plaid Cymru	Graham Lewis	651		
Plaid Cymru	Clive M. Badham	619		
Green	Ian Headford	112		
Turnout			48.3	
Labour hold		Swing		
Labour hold		Swing		

=== Aberaman South (two seats) ===
Aberaman South 1999
Party	Candidate	Votes	%	±%
Plaid Cymru	Julie P. Williams	1,135		
Plaid Cymru	B. John Walter Codd*	1,120		
Labour	Elaine O'Sullivan	770		
Labour	John Rosser	724		
Turnout			52.2	
Plaid Cymru hold		Swing		
Plaid Cymru hold		Swing		

=== Abercynon (two seats) ===
Abercynon 1999
Party	Candidate	Votes	%	±%
Independent Labour	Stuart G. Gregory*	1,722		
Labour	Albert L. Davies*	1,007		
Labour	Philip C. Brown	651		
Plaid Cymru	John Horsman	503		
Green	John Matthews	195		
Turnout			71.6	
Independent Labour hold		Swing		
Labour hold		Swing		

=== Aberdare East (two seats) ===
Aberdare East 1999
Party	Candidate	Votes	%	±%
Labour	Shah M. Imtiaz*	1,104		
Labour	Michael Forey*	1,027		
Plaid Cymru	Raymond Davies	710		
Plaid Cymru	David A. Walters	839		
Liberal Democrats	Colin D. Evans	397		
Liberal Democrats	David M. Gee	240		
Turnout				
Labour hold		Swing		
Labour hold		Swing		

=== Aberdare West, Llwydcoed (three seats) ===
Aberdare West, Llwydcoed 1999
Party	Candidate	Votes	%	±%
Plaid Cymru	Elizabeth Walters	1,728		
Plaid Cymru	Nuzhat Imtiaz	1,348		
Plaid Cymru	W. John Daniel*	1,283		
Labour	Christine Griffiths	1,245		
Labour	Kenneth J. Hawkins	1,026		
Labour	Felicity A. Williams	961		
Turnout				
Plaid Cymru hold		Swing		
Plaid Cymru gain from Labour		Swing		
Plaid Cymru hold		Swing		

=== Beddau (one seat) ===
Beddau 1999
Party	Candidate	Votes	%	±%
Labour	Daniel I. Williams*	533		
Plaid Cymru	Diana Watkins	410		
Liberal Democrats	Verity Belzak	220		
Majority				
Turnout				
Labour hold		Swing		

=== Brynna (one seat) ===
Brynna 1999
Party	Candidate	Votes	%	±%
Independent	Anthony D. Hughes*	785		
Labour	Teresa Bates	322		
Majority				
Turnout				
Independent hold		Swing		

=== Church Village (one seat) ===
Church Village 1999
Party	Candidate	Votes	%	±%
Labour	Graham Stacey*	562	52.1	
Plaid Cymru	John Edwards	517	47.9	
Majority				
Turnout			46.7	
Labour hold		Swing		

=== Cilfynydd (one seat) ===
Cilfynydd 1999
Party	Candidate	Votes	%	±%
Liberal Democrats	Steve Belzak	433	42.0	
Labour	W.E. Morgan*	354	34.4	
Plaid Cymru	G.R. Davies	243	23.6	
Majority				
Turnout				
Liberal Democrats gain from Labour		Swing		

=== Cwmbach (one seat) ===
Cwmbach 1999
Party	Candidate	Votes	%	±%
Labour	I. Jones	728	54.7	
Plaid Cymru	E.L. Smith	604	45.3	
Majority				
Turnout				
Labour hold		Swing		

=== Cwm Clydach (one seat) ===
Cwm Clydach 1999
Party	Candidate	Votes	%	±%
Plaid Cymru	K. Roberts	798	68.9	
Labour	E.T. Jones*	326	28.1	
Green	K. Jakeway	35	3.0	
Majority				
Turnout				
Plaid Cymru gain from Labour		Swing		

=== Cymmer (two seats) ===
Cymmer 1999
Party	Candidate	Votes	%	±%
Labour	Y. Caple	1,135		
Labour	E. Davies*	913		
Plaid Cymru	S. Inkpen	803		
Liberal Democrats	A. Skates	432		
Green	S. Pritchard	221		
Turnout				
Labour hold		Swing		
Labour hold		Swing		

=== Ferndale (two seats) ===
Ferndale 1999
Party	Candidate	Votes	%	±%
Labour	A. Davies*	1,213		
Plaid Cymru	V. Thomas	955		
Labour	K. Rees*	539		
Liberal Democrats	C. Evans	335		
Turnout				
Labour hold		Swing		
Plaid Cymru gain from Labour		Swing		

=== Gilfach Goch (one seat) ===
Roberts had been elected as a Residents' candidate in 1995

Gilfach Goch 1999
Party	Candidate	Votes	%	±%
Labour	Aurfron Roberts*	930	64.4	
Independent	G. Jury	514	35.6	
Majority				
Turnout				
Labour gain from Independent		Swing		

=== Glyncoch (one seat) ===
Glyncoch 1999
Party	Candidate	Votes	%	±%
Labour	J.G. Burford*	564		
Plaid Cymru	A. Cotton	198		
Liberal Democrats	S. Thornton	56		
Majority				
Turnout				
Labour hold		Swing		

=== Graig (one seat) ===
Graig 1999
Party	Candidate	Votes	%	±%
Labour	J. Cass*	366		
Independent	R.G. Fox	284		
Plaid Cymru	Geraint Day	178		
Majority				
Turnout				
Labour hold		Swing		

=== Hawthorn (one seat) ===
Hawthorn 1999
Party	Candidate	Votes	%	±%
Labour	B. Gooch	384		
Liberal Democrats	R. Hillard	327		
Plaid Cymru	E. Francis	250		
Independent	A.J. Wells*	219		
Majority				
Turnout				
Labour gain from Independent		Swing		

=== Hirwaun (one seat) ===
Hirwaun 1999
Party	Candidate	Votes	%	±%
Plaid Cymru	L.M. Lewis	780	54.8	
Labour	W.A. Myring*	643	45.2	
Majority				
Turnout				
Plaid Cymru gain from Labour		Swing		

=== Llanharan (one seat) ===
Llanharan 1999
Party	Candidate	Votes	%	±%
Plaid Cymru	G. Powell	405	42.6	
Labour	T. Morgan	378	39.8	
Liberal Democrats	R. Wewell	167	17.6	
Majority				
Turnout				
Plaid Cymru gain from Labour		Swing		

=== Llanharry (one seat) ===
Llanharry 1999
Party	Candidate	Votes	%	±%
Plaid Cymru	V. Williams	577	64.2	
Labour	J. Beecher	322	35.8	
Majority				
Turnout				
Plaid Cymru gain from Labour		Swing		

=== Llantrisant (one seat) ===
Llantrisant 1999
Party	Candidate	Votes	%	±%
Plaid Cymru	I. Wilkins*	1,106	65.8	
Labour	G. Holmes	575	34.2	
Majority				
Turnout				
Plaid Cymru hold		Swing		

=== Llantwit Fardre (two seats) ===
Llantwit Fardre 1999
Party	Candidate	Votes	%	±%
Plaid Cymru	B.P. Channon	802		
Plaid Cymru	D.R. Watkins	775		
Liberal Democrats	G. Orsi	649		
Labour	M.W. Kear*	502		
Liberal Democrats	L. Orsi	485		
Labour	D.F. Stone*	436		
Turnout				
Plaid Cymru gain from Labour		Swing		
Plaid Cymru gain from Labour		Swing		

=== Llwynypia (one seat) ===
Llwynypia 1999
Party	Candidate	Votes	%	±%
Plaid Cymru	P. Lewis	556	61.3	
Labour	S. Jones	351	38.7	
Majority				
Turnout				
Plaid Cymru gain from Labour		Swing		

=== Maerdy (one seat) ===
Maerdy 1999
Party	Candidate	Votes	%	±%
Plaid Cymru	Gerwyn Evans	763	59.5	
Labour	Bryn Jones*	519	40.5	
Majority				
Turnout				
Plaid Cymru gain from Labour		Swing		

=== Mountain Ash East (one seat) ===
Mountain Ash East 1999
Party	Candidate	Votes	%	±%
Plaid Cymru	Pauline Jarman*	880	78.3	
Labour	P. Dower	244	21.7	
Majority				
Turnout				
Plaid Cymru hold		Swing		

=== Mountain Ash West (two seats) ===
Mountain Ash West 1999
Party	Candidate	Votes	%	±%
Plaid Cymru	C.T. Benney*	879		
Plaid Cymru	A. Davies	777		
Labour	K. Morgan	598		
Turnout				
Plaid Cymru hold		Swing		
Plaid Cymru gain from Labour		Swing		

=== Penrhiwceiber (two seats) ===
Penrhiwceiber 1999
Party	Candidate	Votes	%	±%
Plaid Cymru	K. Evans	925		
Labour	J. Ward	914		
Labour	T. Dower*	849		
Independent	N. Thomas	758		
Turnout				
Plaid Cymru hold		Swing		
Labour hold		Swing		

=== Pentre (two seats) ===
Pentre 1995
Party	Candidate	Votes	%	±%
Plaid Cymru	L. Jones	1,271		
Labour	E. Jenkins	859		
Labour	J. Jenkins*	723		
Independent	A. Thomas	604		
Green	J. Williams	213		
Turnout				
Plaid Cymru gain from Labour		Swing		
Labour hold		Swing		

=== Penygraig (two seats) ===
Penygraig 1999
Party	Candidate	Votes	%	±%
Plaid Cymru	D. Davies	1,129		
Plaid Cymru	C. Hughes	1,066		
Labour	W. Weeks	938		
Labour	K. Privett	933		
Turnout				
Plaid Cymru hold		Swing		
Plaid Cymru gain from Labour		Swing		

=== Penywaun (one seat) ===
Penywaun 1995
Party	Candidate	Votes	%	±%
Plaid Cymru	H. James	435	51.2	
Labour	D. Barnsley*	415	48.8	
Majority				
Turnout				
Plaid Cymru gain from Labour		Swing		

=== Pontyclun (two seats) ===
An additional seat was created in this ward.

Pontyclun 1999
Party	Candidate	Votes	%	±%
Plaid Cymru	Jonathan Huish*	1,031		
Independent	Gordon Norman	766		
Plaid Cymru	Merfyn Rea	658		
Independent	J. Dilworth	520		
Labour	C. Thomas	360		
Labour	C. Morgan	340		
Turnout				
Plaid Cymru hold		Swing		
Independent win (new seat)				

=== Pontypridd (one seat) ===
Pontypridd 1999
Party	Candidate	Votes	%	±%
Plaid Cymru	D. O'Farrell	645	47.9	
Labour	P.G. James*	538	39.9	
Liberal Democrats	S. Howell	164	12.2	
Majority				
Turnout				
Plaid Cymru gain from Labour		Swing		

=== Porth (two seats) ===
Porth 1999
Party	Candidate	Votes	%	±%
Plaid Cymru	D. Rogers	1,136		
Plaid Cymru	Julie Williams	987		
Labour	G. Abbott	831		
Labour	N.G. Stonelake*	775		
Green	K. Pritchard	183		
Turnout				
Plaid Cymru gain from Labour		Swing		
Plaid Cymru gain from Labour		Swing		

=== Rhigos (one seat) ===
Rhigos 1999
Party	Candidate	Votes	%	±%
Plaid Cymru	R. Moses*	unopposed		
Plaid Cymru hold		Swing		

=== Rhondda (two seats) ===
Rhondda 1999
Party	Candidate	Votes	%	±%
Plaid Cymru	C. Beard	865		
Labour	C. Leyshon	699		
Labour	W. Leyshon	661		
Plaid Cymru	D. Summers	653		
Liberal Democrats	T. Hoppery	370		
Liberal Democrats	G. Williams	299		
Green	H O'Callaghan	81		
Turnout		3,628		
Plaid Cymru gain from Labour		Swing		
Labour hold		Swing		

=== Rhydfelen Central / Ilan (one seat) ===
Rhydfelen Central / Ilan 1999
Party	Candidate	Votes	%	±%
Labour	H.J. Cox*	453	41.9	
Plaid Cymru	C. Salisbury	315	29.2	
Independent	R. Baldwin	237	21.9	
Liberal Democrats	G. Williams	75	6.9	
Majority				
Turnout				
Labour hold		Swing		

=== Taffs Well (one seat) ===
Taffs Well 1999
Party	Candidate	Votes	%	±%
Plaid Cymru	A. Hobson	802	62.2	
Labour	J.D. Lintern*	487	37.8	
Majority			24.4	
Turnout			47.0	
Plaid Cymru gain from Labour		Swing		

=== Talbot Green (one seat) ===
Thorngate had been elected as a Labour candidate in 1995.

Talbot Green 1999
Party	Candidate	Votes	%	±%
Independent	C.R. Thorngate*	533	54.8	
Plaid Cymru	W. Owen	213	21.9	
Labour	K. Bates	147	15.1	
Liberal Democrats	S. Ruddick	80	8.2	
Majority				
Turnout				
Independent gain from Labour		Swing		

=== Tonteg (two seats) ===
Tonteg 1999
Party	Candidate	Votes	%	±%
Plaid Cymru	J. Bunn	913		
Labour	W.J. David*	789		
Plaid Cymru	C. Jones	741		
Labour	M. Lloyd*	710		
Liberal Democrats	A. Denton	542		
Turnout				
Plaid Cymru gain from Labour		Swing		
Labour hold		Swing		

=== Tonypandy (one seat) ===
Tonypandy 1999
Party	Candidate	Votes	%	±%
Plaid Cymru	K. Jones	748	52.3	
Labour	A. Edwards*	509	35.6	
Liberal Democrats	W. Allsop	172	12.0	
Majority				
Turnout				
Plaid Cymru gain from Labour		Swing		

=== Tonyrefail East (two seats) ===
Tonyrefail East 1999
Party	Candidate	Votes	%	±%
Labour	R. Roberts*	891		
Labour	R. B. McDonald*	861		
Plaid Cymru	Helen Prosser	763		
Liberal Democrats	M. Southgate	421		
Turnout				
Labour hold		Swing		
Labour hold		Swing		

=== Tonyrefail West (one seat) ===
Tonyrefail West 1999
Party	Candidate	Votes	%	±%
Labour	E. Hanagan	943	80.3	
Liberal Democrats	H. Bruton	231	19.7	
Majority			60.6	
Turnout			33.8	
Labour hold		Swing		

=== Trallwn (one seat) ===
Trallwn 1999
Party	Candidate	Votes	%	±%
Liberal Democrats	Mike Powell	823	53.2	
Labour	A.W. Bevan*	468	30.3	
Plaid Cymru	C. Gregory	256	16.5	
Majority			22.9	
Turnout			51.4	
Liberal Democrats gain from Labour		Swing		

=== Trealaw (one seat) ===
Trealaw 1995
Party	Candidate	Votes	%	±%
Plaid Cymru	R. Winter	574	41.1	
Labour	S. Carnell	541	38.7	
Independent	A. Tree	283	20.2	
Majority			2.4	
Turnout			44.3	
Plaid Cymru gain from Labour		Swing		

=== Treforest (one seat) ===
Treforest 1999
Party	Candidate	Votes	%	±%
Labour	M. Webber	392	35.5	
Plaid Cymru	A.W. Richards	327	29.6	
Liberal Democrats	A. Southgate	264	23.9	
Independent	A.O. Otley	121	11.0	
Majority			5.9	
Turnout			35.5	
Labour hold		Swing		

=== Treherbert (two seats) ===
Treherbert 1999
Party	Candidate	Votes	%	±%
Plaid Cymru	Geraint Rhys Davies*	1,972		
Plaid Cymru	L. Jones	1,591		
Labour	R.J. Bundock*	777		
Labour	M.A. Phillips	620		
Independent	M. Lewis	220		
Green	C. Jakeway	72		
Green	S. Latham	47		
Turnout				
Plaid Cymru hold		Swing		
Plaid Cymru gain from Labour		Swing		

=== Treorchy (three seats) ===
Treorchy 1999
Party	Candidate	Votes	%	±%
Plaid Cymru	Cennard Davies	1,963		
Plaid Cymru	E. Hancock	1,765		
Plaid Cymru	R. Ashton	1,761		
Labour	R. Davies	1,426		
Labour	M. Williams*	1,224		
Labour	D.M. Lewis*	1,080		
Green	N. Phillips	226		
Green	C. Headford	193		
Turnout				
Plaid Cymru gain from Labour		Swing		
Plaid Cymru gain from Labour		Swing		
Plaid Cymru gain from Labour		Swing		

=== Tylorstown (two seats) ===
Tylorstown 1999
Party	Candidate	Votes	%	±%
Labour	D.R. Bevan*	1,014		
Plaid Cymru	M. Brittain	977		
Labour	L. Adams	908		
Turnout			53.9	
Labour hold		Swing		
Plaid Cymru gain from Labour		Swing		

=== Tyn-y-Nant (one seat) ===
Tyn-y-Nant 1999
Party	Candidate	Votes	%	±%
Labour	C.J. Willis*	890	75.7	
Plaid Cymru	R. Humphreys	285	24.3	
Majority			51.5	
Turnout			43.7	
Labour hold		Swing		

=== Ynyshir (one seat) ===
Ynyshir 1999
Party	Candidate	Votes	%	±%
Labour	W. Langford	870	62.1	
Plaid Cymru	D. James	530	37.9	
Majority			24.3	
Turnout			51.2	
Labour hold		Swing		

=== Ynysybwl (one seat) ===
Ynysybwl 1999
Party	Candidate	Votes	%	±%
Plaid Cymru	D. Arnold	745	45.7	
Labour	G. Crocker	504	30.9	
Independent	D.S. Breeze	380	22.3	
Majority			14.8	
Turnout			44.6	
Plaid Cymru gain from Labour		Swing		

=== Ystrad (two seats) ===
Ystrad 1999
Party	Candidate	Votes	%	±%
Plaid Cymru	Syd Morgan*	1,775		
Plaid Cymru	J. Jones	1,687		
Labour	Chris Evans	694		
Labour	J. Scobie	500		
Turnout			51.3	
Plaid Cymru hold		Swing		
Plaid Cymru hold		Swing		
