= Rhondda Cynon Taf County Borough Council =

Local government of Rhondda Cynon Taf, Wales

Rhondda Cynon Taf County Borough Council Cyngor Bwrdeistref Sirol Rhondda Cynon Taf (Welsh)

Type
- Type: Principal council of Rhondda Cynon Taf

History
- Founded: 1 April 1996
- Preceded by: Mid Glamorgan County Council; Cynon Valley Borough Council; Rhondda Borough Council; Taff-Ely Borough Council

Leadership
- Mayor: Emma Watts, Labour since 29 April 2026
- Leader: Ann Crimmings, Labour since 29 April 2026
- Chief Executive: Paul Mee since 1 December 2022

Structure
- Seats: 75 councillors
- Graph of the party split among 75 seats.
- Political groups: Administration (57) Labour (57) Other parties (18) Plaid Cymru (8) Conservative (2) Green (1) Independent (7)
- Length of term: 5 years

Elections
- Voting system: First past the post
- First election: 4 May 1995
- Last election: 5 May 2022
- Next election: 6 May 2027

Meeting place
- 2 Llys Cadwyn, Taff Street, Pontypridd, CF37 4TH

Website
- www.rctcbc.gov.uk

Rhondda Cynon Taf County Borough Council (Welsh: Cyngor Bwrdeistref Sirol Rhondda Cynon Taf) is the local authority for the county borough of Rhondda Cynon Taf, one of the principal areas of Wales. The council headquarters are at the Llys Cadwyn development in Pontypridd.

== History ==
The council was established on 1 April 1996 under the Local Government (Wales) Act 1994, covering the area of the three former districts of Rhondda, Cynon Valley, and Taff-Ely (except Pentyrch, which went to Cardiff). As well as taking over the functions of the abolished district councils, the new authority also took over the functions of the abolished Mid Glamorgan County Council in the area. The new county borough was described in the 1994 Act with different spellings in English and Welsh: Rhondda Cynon Taff (English) / Rhondda Cynon Taf (Welsh). In 1999, the council adopted the spelling Rhondda Cynon Taf for use in both languages.

== Political control ==
The council has been under Labour majority control since 2004.

The first election to the council was held in 1995, initially operating as a shadow authority before coming into its powers on 1 April 1996. Political control of the council since 1996 has been as follows:

Party in control	Years
Labour	1996–1999
Plaid Cymru	1999–2004
Labour	2004–present

=== Leadership ===
The role of Mayor of Rhondda is largely ceremonial. Political leadership is provided by the leader of the council. The first leader, Bill Murphy, was the last leader of the old Rhondda Borough Council. The leaders since 1996 have been:

Councillor	Party	From	To
Bill Murphy	Labour	1 Apr 1996	May 1998
Russell Roberts	Labour	May 1998	1999
Pauline Jarman	Plaid Cymru	1999	2004
Russell Roberts	Labour	2004	May 2012
Anthony Christopher	Labour	23 May 2012	15 May 2014
Andrew Morgan	Labour	28 May 2014	29 Apr 2026
Ann Crimmings	Labour	29 Apr 2026	

=== Composition ===
Following the 2022 election and subsequent by-elections and changes of allegiance up to October 2026, the composition of the council was:

Party	Seats
Labour	57
Plaid Cymru	8
Conservative	2
Green	1
Independent	7
Total	75

The Green councillor and two of the independent councillors sit together as the 'RCT Independent Group'. Another three independents form the 'Independent Group', and the other two independents are not aligned to a group. The next election is due in 2027.

== Elections ==
Since 2012, elections take place every five years.

Year	Seats	Labour	Plaid Cymru	Liberal Democrats	Conservative	Others	Notes
1995	74	**54**	14	1	0	5	Labour majority control
1999	75	26	**38**	4	0	7	Plaid Cymru majority control
2004	75	**57**	13	1	0	4	Labour majority control
2008	75	**44**	20	4	1	6	Labour majority control
2012	75	**60**	9	1	1	4	Labour majority control
2017	75	**47**	18	1	4	5	Labour majority control
2022	75	**59**	8	0	2	6	Labour majority control

Party with the most elected councillors in bold. Coalition agreements in notes column.

== Premises ==
The council is based at the Llys Cadwyn development on Taff Street in the centre of Pontypridd. The complex was built in 2020, comprising a library, council customer contact point, café, leisure facilities and offices. The offices were initially marketed for rent, with some being taken up, notably by Transport for Wales. In 2023 the council decided to move its council chamber and principal offices into some of the remaining vacant office space at 2 Llys Cadwyn, moving into the building in early 2024.

The council was previously based at The Pavilions, a group of 1990s office buildings at the Cambrian Industrial Park in the community of Cwm Clydach on the outskirts of Tonypandy in the Rhondda, which is the largest urban area in the borough. When the council was created it inherited the offices of the three former district councils, being Rock Grounds on High Street in Aberdare from Cynon Valley, the Municipal Offices on Llewellyn Street in Pentre from Rhondda, and the Municipal Buildings on Gelliwastad Road in Pontypridd from Taff-Ely. In the period leading up to the creation of the new authority there was some debate about where the new council should be based, with Plaid Cymru leading a campaign for Pontypridd to be the headquarters, but Labour preferring a location in the Rhondda. The recently built site at The Pavilions was secured for the new council in 1995. The older offices at Aberdare and Pontypridd continue to be used by the council as secondary offices, whilst the Pentre building has been sold. The Pavilions is earmarked to become a new special school for the area.

== Mayors of Rhondda Cynon Taf ==
Past mayors of the council are:

- 1996–1997: Russell Roberts
- 1997–1998: K Rees
- 1998–1999: J David
- 1999–2000: G Beard (Note: Served as Chairman, not Mayor)
- 2000–2001: R Moses (Note: Served as Chairwoman, not Mayor)
- 2001–2002: L Jones
- 2002–2003: I Wilkins
- 2003–2004: D E B Arnold
- 2004–2005: A L Davies
- 2005–2006: E Jenkins
- 2006–2007: J Cass
- 2007–2008: Jane Ward
- 2008–2009: Margaret Davies
- 2009–2010: Robert Smith
- 2010–2011: Simon Lloyd
- 2011–2012: Sylvia J Jones
- 2012–2013: Doug H Williams
- 2013–2014: Ann Crimmings
- 2014–2015: John Watts
- 2015–2016: Barry Stephens
- 2016–2017: Rhys Lewis
- 2017–2018: Margaret Tegg
- 2018–2019: Steve Powderhill
- 2019–2020: Linda De Vet
- 2020–2021: Susan Morgans
- 2021–2022: Jill Bonetto
- 2022–2023: Wendy Treeby
- 2023–2024: Wendy Lewis
- 2024–2025: Dan Owen-Jones
- 2025–2026: Sheryl Evans
- 2026–: Emma Watts

== Electoral wards ==
Pre-2022 electoral wards in Rhondda Cynon Taf

Since the 2022 elections, the Rhondda Cynon Taf county borough has been divided into 46 electoral wards returning 75 councillors. Some of these electoral wards are coterminous with communities (parishes) of the same name. Some communities have their own elected council. The following table lists council electoral wards, communities and associated geographical areas:

Electoral wards	Councillors	Communities (civil parishes)	Other geographic areas
Aberaman	3	Aberaman North; Aberaman South	Abercwmboi, Cwmaman, Glynhafod, Godreaman
Abercynon ^{c}	2	Abercynon	Carnetown, Pontcynon, Tyntetown, Ynysboeth
Aberdare East ^{c}	2	Aberdare East	Abernant, Foundry Town, Tŷ Fry
Aberdare West and Llwydcoed	3	Aberdare West; Llwydcoed	Bwllfa Dare, Cwmdare, Robertstown, Trecynon,
Beddau and Tyn-y-nant	2	Llantrisant * (Beddau and Tyn-y-nant wards)	Beddau, Brynteg
Brynna and Llanharan	3	Llanharan *	Bryncae, Brynna, Dolau, Llanharan
Church Village	2	Llantwit Fardre * (Church Village ward)	Upper Church Village
Cilfynydd	1	Pontypridd Town * (Cilfynydd ward)	
Cwm Clydach ^{c}	1	Cwm Clydach	Clydach Vale
Cwmbach ^{c}	2	Cwmbach	
Cymer	2	Cymmer; Trehafod	Cymmer, Glynfach, Trebanog, Trehafod
Ferndale and Maerdy	2	Ferndale; Maerdy	Blaenllechau
Gilfach Goch ^{c}	1	Gilfach Goch *	Garden City, Hendreforgan Estate
Glyn-coch	1	Pontypridd Town * (Glyncoch ward)	
Graig and Pontypridd West	2	Pontypridd Town * (Graig and Rhondda wards)	Maesycoed, Pantygraigwen, Pen-y-coedcae, Hopkinstown, Pwllgwaun
Hawthorn and Lower Rhydfelen	1	Pontypridd Town * (Hawthorn and Rhydfelen Lower wards)	Upper Boat
Hirwaun, Penderyn and Rhigos	2	Hirwaun * Rhigos *	Cwm Hwnt, Cefn Rhigos, Hirwaun, Penderyn
Llanharry	1	Llanharry * (Llanharry ward)	
Llantrisant and Talbot Green	2	Llantrisant * (Llantrisant Town and Talbot Green wards)	Cross Inn, Llantrisant, Rhiwsaeson, Talbot Green, Ynysmaerdy
Llantwit Fardre	2	Llantwit Fardre * (Efail Isaf and Llantwit Fardre wards)	Efail Isaf
Llwyn-y-pia ^{c}	1	Llwynypia	
Mountain Ash	2	Mountain Ash East; Mountain Ash West	Cefnpennar, Cwmpennar, Fernhill, Glenboi, Newtown
Penrhiw-ceiber ^{c}	2	Penrhiwceiber	Miskin, Perthcelyn
Pentre ^{c}	2	Pentre	Ton Pentre
Pen-y-graig ^{c}	2	Pen-y-graig	Dinas, Edmondstown, Penpisgah, Williamstown
Pen-y-waun ^{c}	1	Pen-y-waun	Trenant
Pontyclun Central	1	Pontyclun * (Central ward)	Miskin, Rhondda Cynon Taff, Pontyclun
Pontyclun East	1	Pontyclun * (East ward)	Groes-faen, Mwyndy
Pontyclun West	1	Pont-y-clun * (West ward); Llanharry * (Tylagarw ward)	Brynsadler, Pontyclun, Tyla Garw
Pontypridd Town	1	Pontypridd Town * (Town ward)	Penygraigwen
Porth	2	Porth	Birchgrove, Llwyncelyn, Mount Pleasant
Rhydfelen Central	1	Pontypridd Town * (Rhydfelen Central ward)	Rhydyfelin
Taffs Well ^{c}	1	Taffs Well *	Glan-y-llyn, Nantgarw, Taff's Well, Tŷ Rhiw
Ton-teg	1	Llantwit Fardre * (Tonteg ward)	
Tonypandy ^{c}	1	Tonypandy	
Tonyrefail East	2	Tonyrefail * (Coedely, Collena and Tylcha wards)	Coedely
Tonyrefail West	2	Tonyrefail * (Penrhiw-fer, Thomastown and Tynybryn wards)	
Trallwn	1	Pontypridd Town * (Trallwng ward)	
Trealaw ^{c}	1	Trealaw	
Treforest	1	Pontypridd Town * (Treforest ward)	Glyntaff
Treherbert ^{c}	2	Treherbert	Blaencwm, Blaenrhondda, Tynewydd,
Treorchy ^{c}	2	Treorchy	Cwmparc, Ynyswen
Tylorstown and Ynyshir	2	Tylorstown; Ynyshir	Penrhys, Pontygwaith, Stanleytown, Wattstown
Upper Rhydfelen and Glyn-Taf	1	Pontypridd Town * (Upper Rhydfelen and Glyn-taf ward)	Rhydyfelin
Ynysybwl	2	Ynysybwl and Coed-y-Cwm *	Roberttown, Buarth-y-capel
Ystrad ^{c}	2	Ystrad	Gelli

* = Communities which elect a community council
^{c} = Ward coterminous with community of the same name

== See also ==
- Environment Agency v Clark
