= Syd Morgan =

Welsh nationalist politician

Syd Morgan is a Welsh nationalist politician.

Morgan studied at the University College Swansea and became active in Plaid Cymru. He was a founder member of the National Left group within the party in 1980.

By 1984, Morgan was a Plaid Cymru member of the Rhymney Valley District Council, and was also the party's Senior Vice-Chairman, while working as a housing officer in Cardiff. At the 1984 European election, Morgan stood in South Wales East, taking fourth place with 8.7% of the votes cast. Later in the year, he was elected as party chairman, serving until 1990 when he became its treasurer. Morgan stood for the UK Parliament at the 1989 Pontypridd by-election, in which he took second place with more than a quarter of the vote.

In 1992, Morgan married Jill Evans, a prominent Plaid politician. Following the redistricting of local government in Wales, he became a councillor in Rhondda Cynon Taf for many years, losing his seat in 2004 and last standing in 2008. He works as a lecturer at Swansea University, was until 2011 a member of the bureau of the Centre Maurits Coppieters, and was a founder of the Welsh Nationalism Foundation.

Party political offices
Preceded by Dafydd Iwan	Chair of Plaid Cymru; 1984–1990	Succeeded by Ieuan Wyn Jones
