= Jill Evans =

British politician and MEP

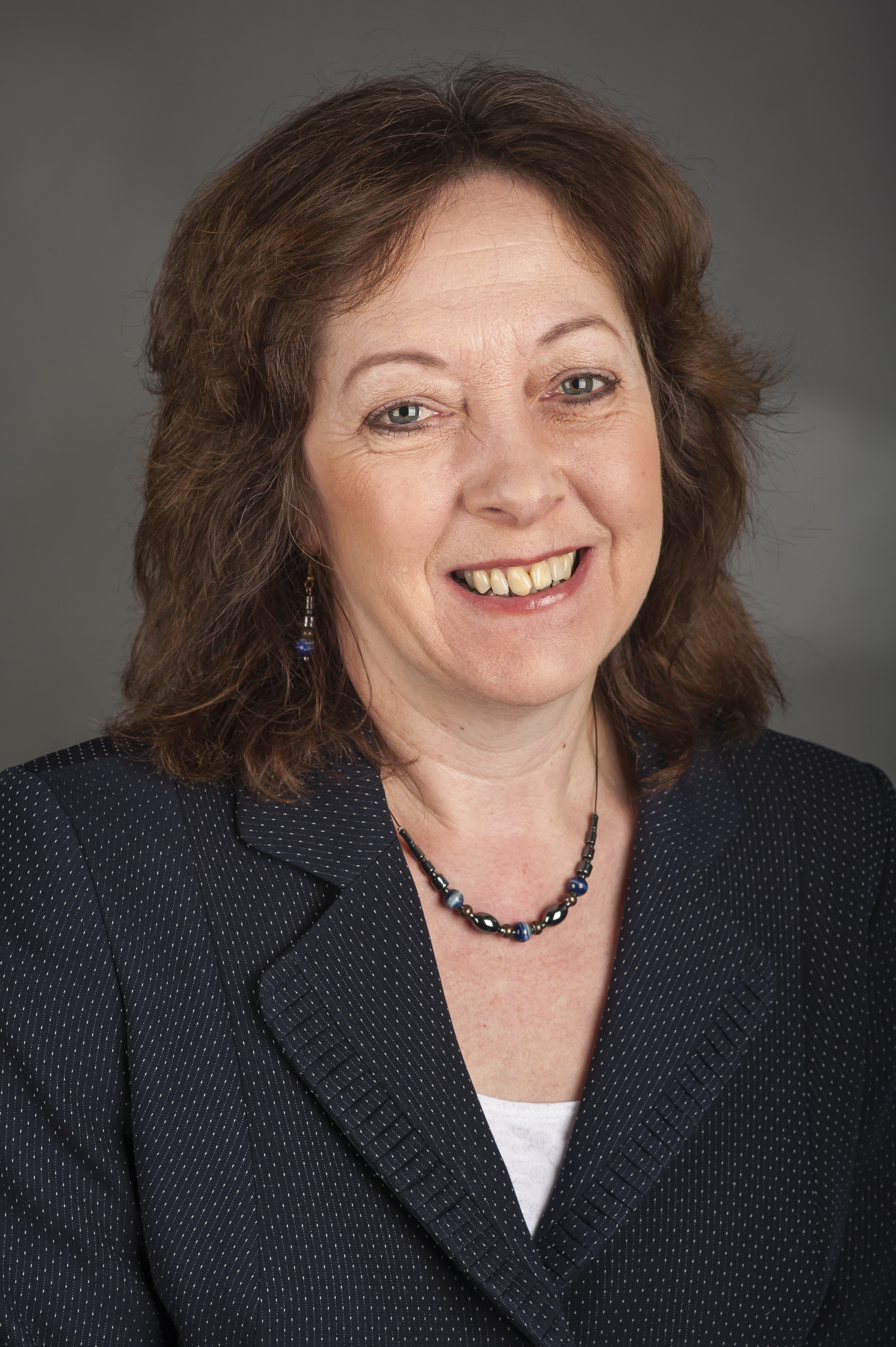
- Evans in 2014

Member of the European Parliament for Wales
- In office 10 June 1999 – 31 January 2020
- Preceded by: Constituency established
- Succeeded by: Constituency abolished

Personal details
- Born: 8 May 1959 (age 67) Ystrad, Rhondda, Wales
- Party: Welsh; Plaid Cymru; EU; European Free Alliance
- Spouse: Syd Morgan
- Education: University of Wales, Aberystwyth; Glamorgan University (now the University of South Wales)
- Occupation: Member of the European Parliament

Video Introduction (English) / (Welsh)

Jill Evans (born 8 May 1959) is a Plaid Cymru politician who served as a Member of the European Parliament (MEP) for Wales from 1999 to 2020. She was the first person to use the Welsh language in debate at the European Parliament.

In June 1999, Evans was elected as one of the first Plaid Cymru MEPs, and was re-elected every five years until the last occasion in 2019. From 2009 until 2014, she was the Vice-President of the Greens/European Free Alliance Group, and is a member of the Committee on Culture and Education.

She also deputised on the Transport and Tourism Committee and was a member of the Delegation for relations with Switzerland and Norway and to the EU-Iceland Joint Parliamentary Committee and the European Economic Area (EEA) Joint Parliamentary Committee.

== Background ==
Evans was born in Ystrad, Rhondda. She was educated at Tonypandy Grammar School before attending the Polytechnic of Wales, Trefforest (now the University of South Wales) where she earned an M.Phil.

== Professional career ==
Evans worked as a research assistant at the former Polytechnic of Wales. She later worked as public affairs officer for the National Federation of Women's Institutes in Wales for six years. Following her first election to public office, she took up the post of Wales Organiser for CHILD - the infertility support network.

== Political career ==
Evans was a political activist before being elected to public office, and participated in the Greenham Common campaign. She first stood in Torfaen in the general election of 1987. She was later elected to Rhondda Borough Council in 1992, Mid Glamorgan County Council in 1993, and, following the abolition of these, to the Rhondda Cynon Taf Council in 1995, from which she stood down in 1999.

During her time as a councillor, she was elected as Plaid Cymru's Alternate Member of the Committee of the Regions in 1993 and served for four years, and was also the party's representative on the European Free Alliance, working with Plaid Cymru's sister parties throughout the continent. In 2004 she became the first member of the European Parliament to use the Welsh language in debate, following a change in the rules, permitting the use of a non-official EU language, though without the benefit of translation. After making most of her speech in English, she reiterated the key points in Welsh, saying that it was a step forward towards a Europe of the peoples and a Europe that celebrates its diversity.

Evans was Chair of Plaid Cymru between 1994 and 1996. In June 1999 she was elected as a Member of the European Parliament for Wales, becoming one of the Party's first MEPs. She was re-elected in 2004, 2009, 2014 and 2019.

During the 2009 – 2014 Parliament, Evans was a member of the Green / European Free Alliance (EFA) Group - the fourth largest group in the Parliament. She was the President of EFA, and the first Vice-President of the Greens/EFA Group in the European Parliament. She also deputised on the Delegation for Relations with the Palestine Legislative Council.

She was a member of the Committee on the Environment, Public Health and Food Safety and the Delegation for relations with Iraq. She deputised on the Agriculture Committee.

In the parliament (2014–2019), Evans was the Vice-President of the EFA Group, and a member of the Committee on Culture and Education. She deputised on the Transport and Tourism Committee. She was also a member of the Delegation for relations with Switzerland and Norway and to the EU-Iceland Joint Parliamentary Committee, and the European Economic Area (EEA) Joint Parliamentary Committee.

Evans is a former President of Plaid Cymru, and was the Chair of CND Cymru from 2001 to 2011.

Party political offices
Preceded by John Dixon	Chair of Plaid Cymru; 1994–1996	Succeeded by Marc Phillips
Preceded by Dafydd Iwan	Vice President of Plaid Cymru; 2004–2010	Succeeded by Chris Franks
Preceded by Dafydd Iwan	President of Plaid Cymru; 2010–2013	Position abolished
European Parliament
New constituency	Member of European Parliament for Wales; 1999–2020	Constituency abolished
