= Creigiau railway station =

Former railway station in Wales

Creigiau

General information
- Location: Creigiau, Cardiff; Wales
- Coordinates: 51.5252°N 3.3231°W
- Grid reference: ST083815
- Platforms: 2

Other information
- Status: Disused

History
- Original company: Barry Railway
- Pre-grouping: Barry Railway
- Post-grouping: Great Western Railway

Key dates
- 16 March 1896: Station opened
- 10 September 1962: Station closed
Location

Creigiau railway station was a railway station in Creigiau in south Wales. It was on the Barry Railway between Efail Isaf and Wenvoe, which ran broadly north–south through Creigiau. To the east of the station, a second former line headed north-west towards Llantrisant, and south-east towards Cardiff. There was no connection between these lines; the Barry Railway line passed over the former Llantrisant and Taff Vale Junction Railway's and later Taff Vale Railway's Waterhall branch to the north of the station. During the Second World War, the station was used to transfer American military to the nearby hospital at Rhydlafar. The Railway closed in 1962.

Both platforms remain, albeit rather overgrown. The site of the station buildings and yard is now used by a coach operator.

Preceding station	Disused railways	Following station
Efail Isaf; Line and station closed	Barry Railway; Trehafod/Treforest-Cadoxton	St-y-Nyll Platform; Line and station closed
Efail Isaf; Line and station closed	Barry Railway; Trehafod/Treforest-Cardiff	St Fagans; Line and station closed

== Future ==
A £135,000 study was announced in 2019 to inform a strategic outline business case for bringing the disused rail route from Llantrisant to Cardiff via Creigiau back into use as part of the South Wales Metro. Any new service would operate tram-trains, which could run in battery mode.
