= Church village =

Church Village is a village in Wales, UK.

Church Village or Church village may also refer to:

- Church Village, Barbados
- Church Village, Iowa
- Upper Church Village, a ward of Church Village, Wales
- Kirchdorf
- Kyrkstad
