= Efail Isaf railway station =

Former railway station in Wales

Efail Isaf
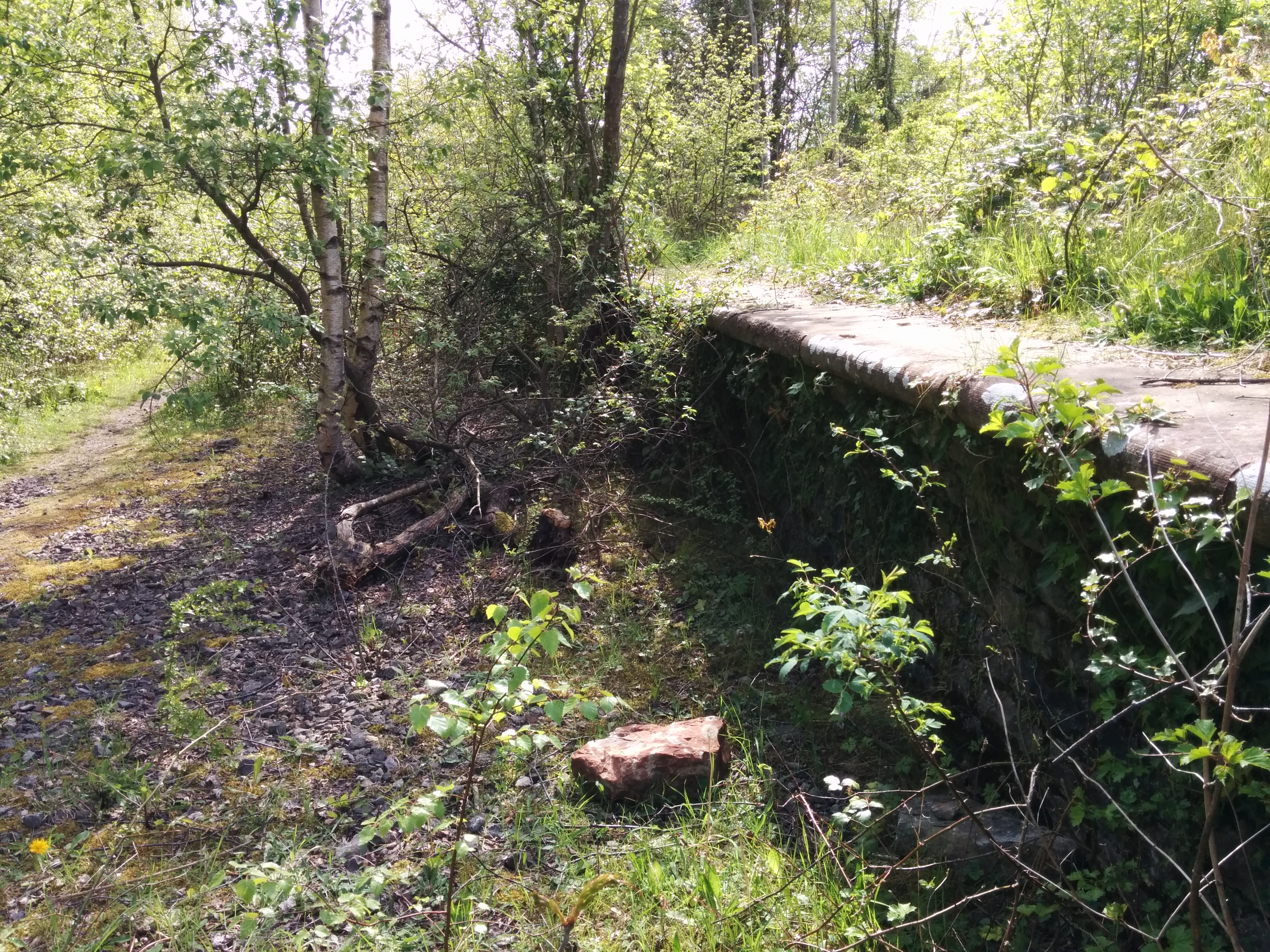
- Abandoned platform of Efail Isaf station, facing west

General information
- Location: Efail Isaf, Rhondda Cynon Taf; Wales
- Coordinates: 51.5569°N 3.3162°W
- Grid reference: ST088850
- Platforms: 2

Other information
- Status: Disused

History
- Original company: Barry Railway
- Pre-grouping: Barry Railway
- Post-grouping: Great Western Railway

Key dates
- 16 March 1896: Station opened
- 10 September 1962: Station closed
Location

Efail Isaf railway station was a former railway station in Efail Isaf in south Wales. It was on the Barry Railway between Tonteg and Wenvoe, which ran broadly north–south through Creigiau.

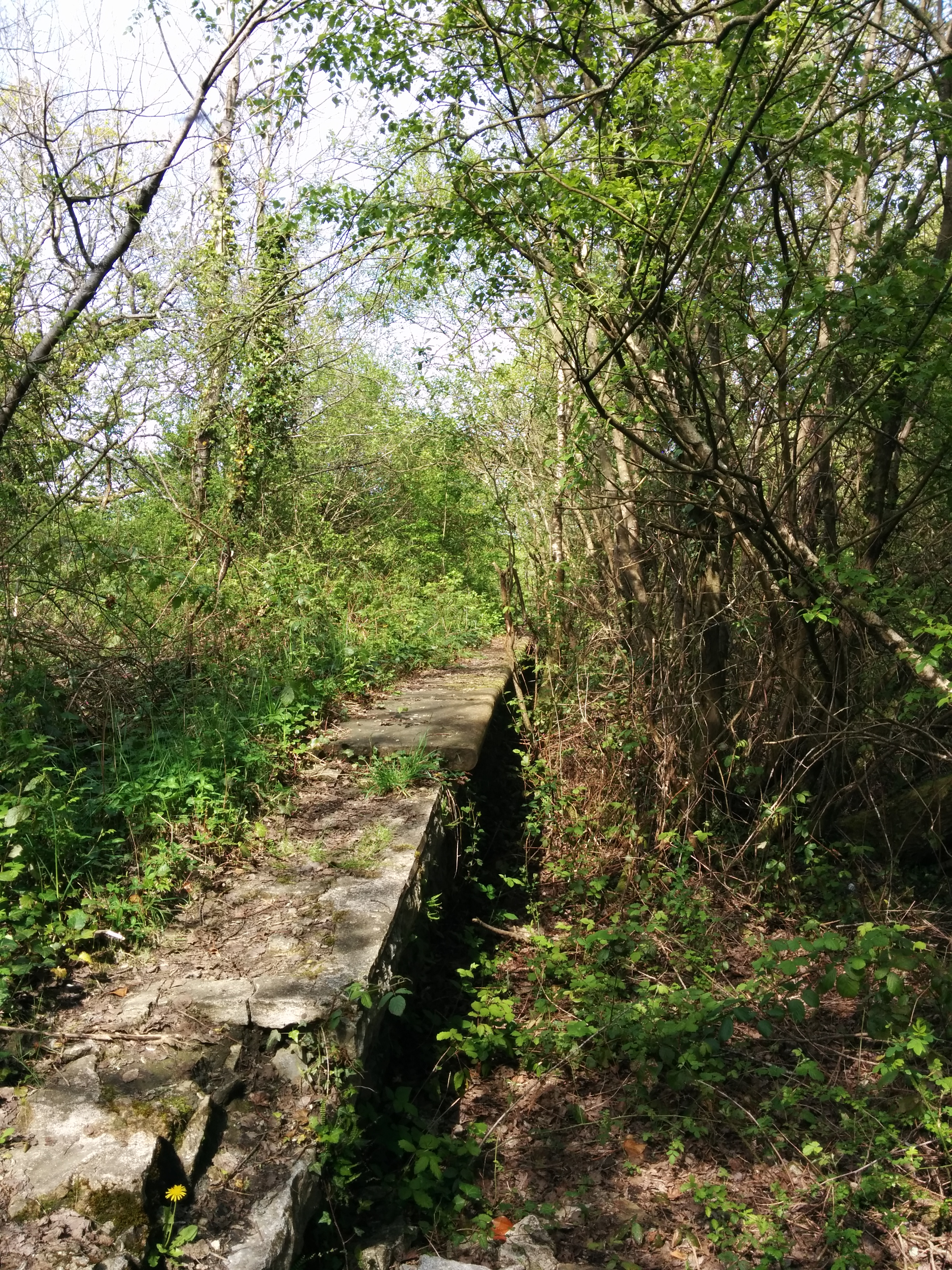
Abandoned platform of Efail Isaf Railway Station, facing east.

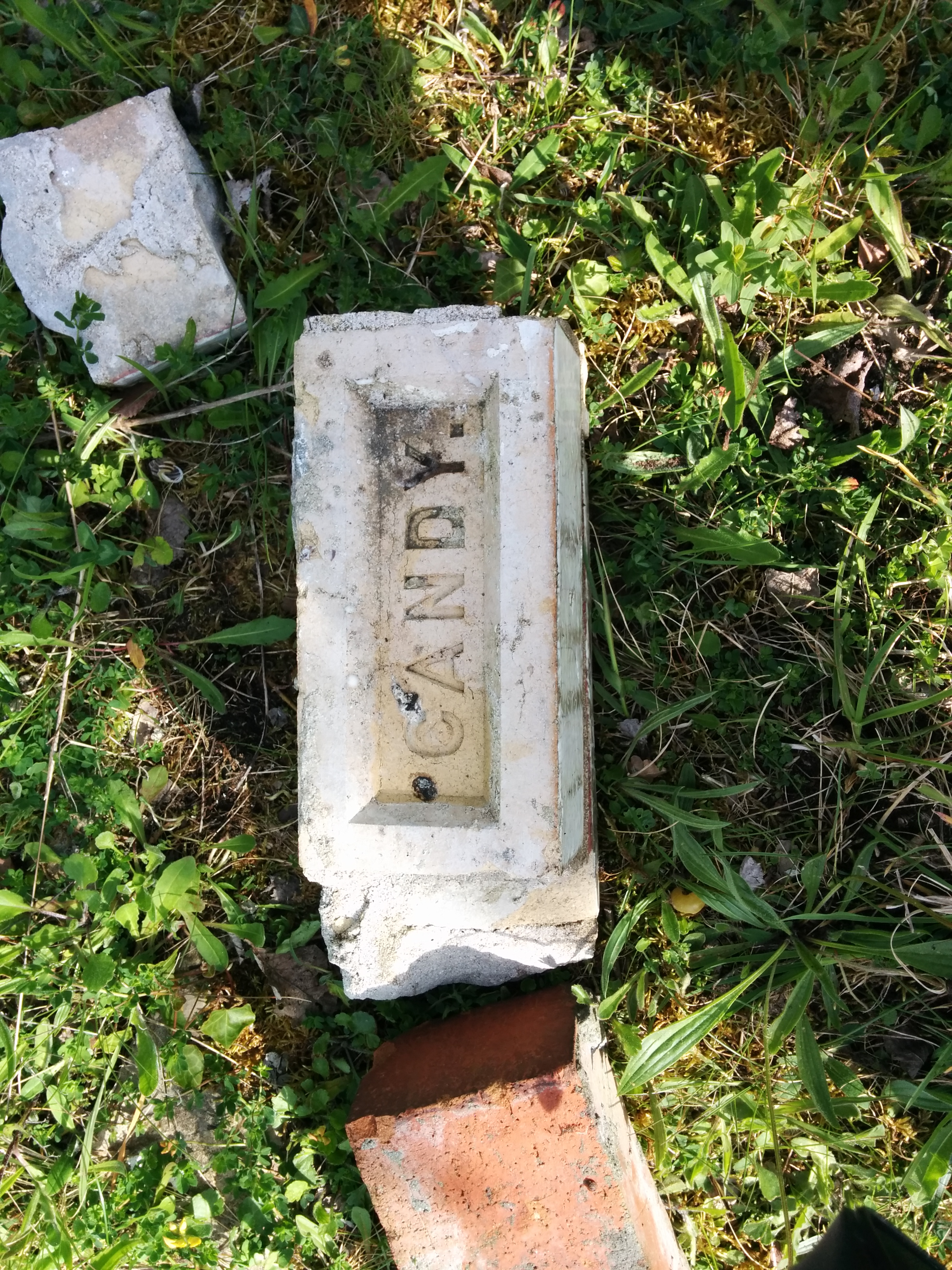
Brick from abandoned Efail Isaf Railway Station.

== History ==
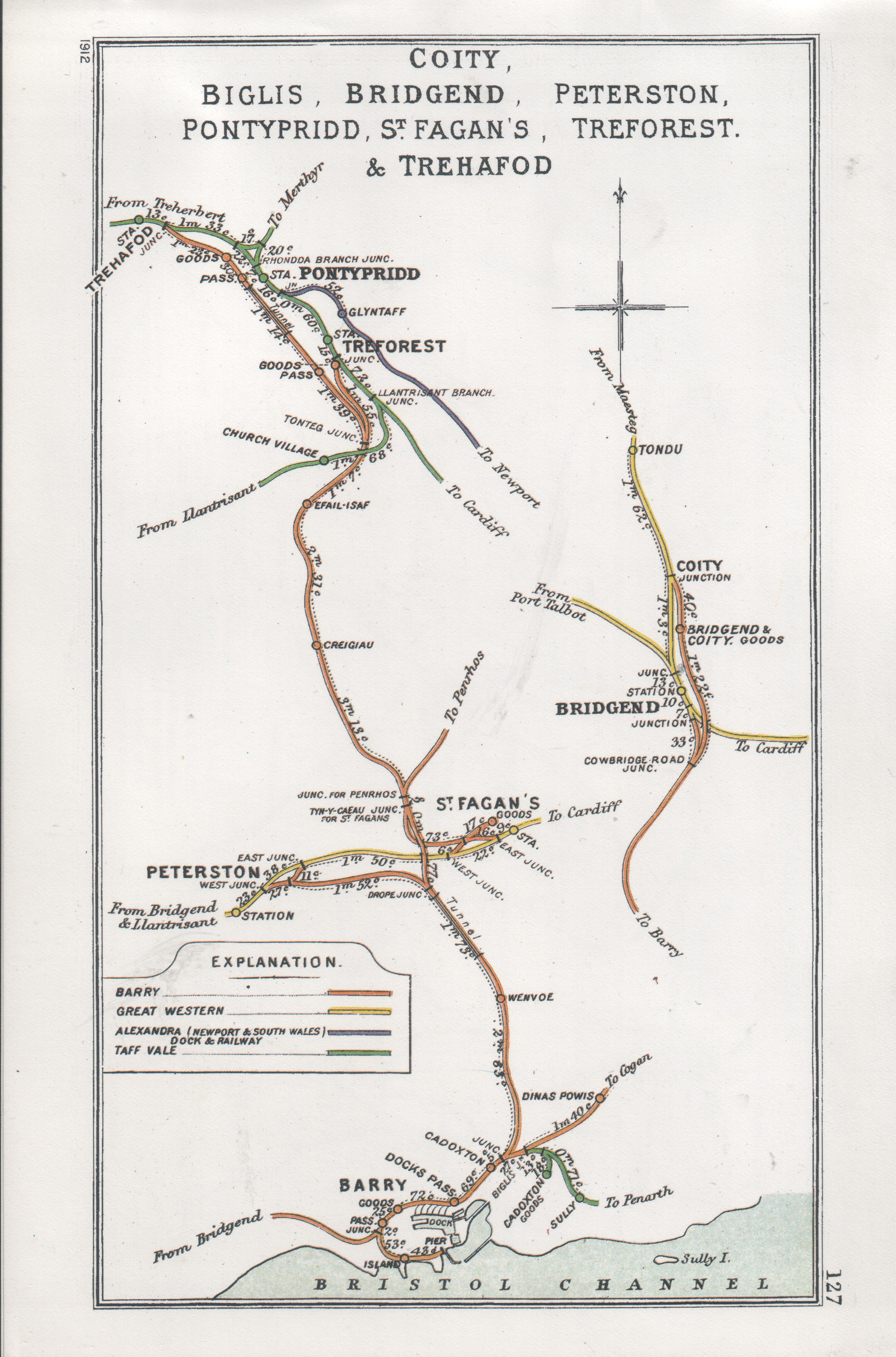
A 1912 Railway Clearing House Junction Diagram showing railways in the vicinity of Efail Isaf (upper centre left)

The Barry Railway line between Barry and Trehafod had opened for goods trains on 18 July 1889, but initially there was no passenger service. A passenger service over the route, which ran through to Porth, was inaugurated on 16 March 1896, and Efail Isaf was one of the stations opened that day.

The line and station closed to passengers on 10 September 1962.

The layout was of four lines, two through lines and two platforms on the outer lines only; a short siding existed additionally. The platforms remain and a public footpath now runs between them, the platforms mainly intact and the foundations of the buildings still evident with original floor tiles showing in places.

| Preceding station | Disused railways | Following station |
|---|---|---|
| Tonteg Halt; Line and station closed | Barry Railway; Porth-Barry | Creigiau; Line and station closed |
