= Devonia =

Devonia may refer to:

- Devonia was one of the GWR 3031 Class locomotives that were built for and run on the Great Western Railway between 1891 and 1915
- Devonia (steamer), a passenger ferry, formerly named the Scillonian before 2004
- PS Devonia, a British paddle steamer in service 1905 to 1940.
- Devonia, Tennessee, a town in the USA
