= Rhydlafar =

Village in Cardiff, Wales

Coordinates: 51.5131°N 3.2808°W

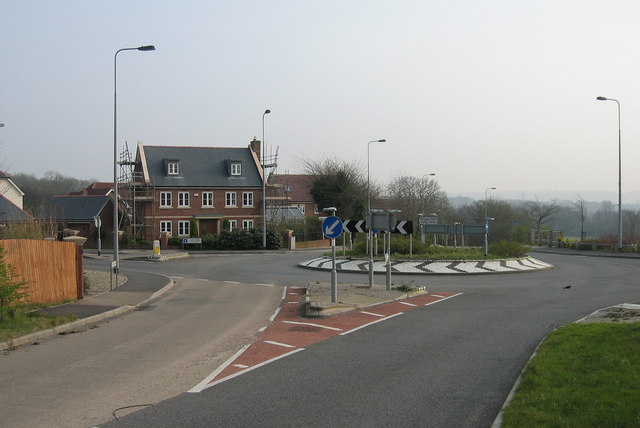

- Location within Cardiff
- Principal area: Cardiff
- Preserved county: South Glamorgan
- Country: Wales
- Sovereign state: United Kingdom
- Post town: CARDIFF
- Dialling code: 029
- Police: South Wales
- Fire: South Wales
- Ambulance: Welsh
- UK Parliament: Cardiff West
- Senedd Cymru – Welsh Parliament: Cardiff West

Rhydlafar is a small settlement in Wales located on the outskirts of Cardiff, around 5 miles west of the city centre and 5 miles south-east of Llantrisant. The village falls within the community and ward of Creigiau & St Fagans. It was formerly the site of the specialist Prince of Wales Orthopaedic Hospital, and the settlement essentially comprises a recent housing estate development built over the former hospital.

== Location ==
The A4119 road lies just to the south, the dismantled railway of the Penrhos branch of the Barry Railway is immediately east, and the M4 bounds the settlement to the north.

== Etymology ==
The name probably originates from the Welsh language word rhyd ('ford': see also 'Rhydaman' or 'Ammanford', etc.) and the stream 'Llafar' ('spoken', 'voiced') which flows nearby; thus the meaning could be rendered 'Ford on the (river) Llafar' with Llafar being a common name for streams roughly equivalent to "babbling" in English (e.g. "a babbling brook"). Incidentally, 'llafar' is Welsh for 'speech' or 'chat'.

== Hospital ==
The Prince of Wales Orthopaedic Hospital was a specialist health facility which closed in 1998. The site previously occupied by the hospital is now a housing development on a landscaped site.
