= Llantwit =

Llantwit may refer to:

- Llantwit - suburb of Neath, Neath Port Talbot, Wales
- Llantwit Major - coastal village in the Vale of Glamorgan, Wales
- Llantwit Fardre - village between Pontypridd and Bridgend, Rhondda Cynon Taf, Wales
