= Church Village =

Village in Rhonda Cynon Taf, Wales

Coordinates: 51.569920°N 3.321605°W

Church Village: Welsh: Pentre'r Eglwys
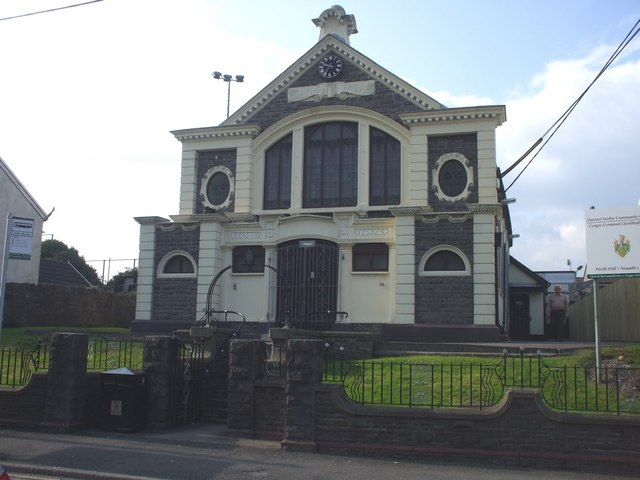
- Old Carnegie Library, Church Village

- Location within Rhondda Cynon Taf
- Population: 5,021 (2011 Ward)
- Community: Llantwit Fardre
- Principal area: Rhondda Cynon Taf
- Preserved county: Mid Glamorgan
- Country: Wales
- Sovereign state: United Kingdom
- Post town: PONTYPRIDD
- Postcode district: CF38
- Dialling code: 01443
- Police: South Wales
- Fire: South Wales
- Ambulance: Welsh
- UK Parliament: Pontypridd
- Senedd Cymru – Welsh Parliament: Pontypridd, South Wales Central Electoral Region

Church Village (Welsh: Pentre'r Eglwys) is a large village in the historic parish and community of Llantwit Fardre, located within the Taff Ely district of the County Borough of Rhondda Cynon Taf in Wales. The village is centrally located being around 4 miles (6.4 km) from the local principal towns of Llantrisant to the southwest and Pontypridd to the north and is situated approximately 8 miles northwest of Cardiff city centre.

== History ==
Historically the village was known as Cross Inn and fell within the traditional county of Glamorgan.

Church Village itself does not share the extent of industrial mining heritage of much of the rest of the county and largely comprises new and recent build housing. It is a rapidly growing urban area, today almost a town rather than a village, being much sought after to live in due to its proximity to Cardiff and Pontyclun, being rated one of Wales' least deprived areas with the best access to services in the country.

Church Village is also commonly used to refer to the whole CF38 postcode area of Pontypridd, comprising the adjoining principal settlements of – Beddau, Efail Isaf, Llantwit Fardre, Ton-Teg, Tyn-y-Nant and Upper Church Village.

Church village was served by Church Village railway station on the Llantrisant and Taff Vale Junction Railway until 1964. This line provided services between Pontypridd, Pontyclun and Cowbridge. At the boundary of Church Village and Efail Isaf, the station of the latter place on the Barry Railway provided services between Pontypridd, Creigiau, Wenvoe and Barry, and also Cardiff via St. Fagans. This line, of regional importance for freight and passengers, closed in 1963. The two lines joined at Tonteg Junction. Both lines have been lost to growing population, housing and road developments. The platforms are still visible at the former Efail Isaf and Tonteg stations.

Costain, under contract from Rhondda Cynon Taf County Borough Council constructed a bypass to reduce traffic congestion on the A473, Pontypridd to Bridgend (Welsh: Penybont) road, from Cross Inn, near Llantrisant, to Tonteg via Efail Isaf. The Church Village bypass, which is built as a single carriageway, with crawler and overtaking lanes around roundabouts opened in September 2010.

The village is home to Clare E. Potter, a Welsh poet who directed The Wall and the Mirror, an episode of New Voices from Wales.

== Education ==
Church Village is the site of one of the newest school sites in Wales, which is called Gartholwg Community Campus. This initiative houses a 3–19 school newly renamed Ysgol Garth Olwg comprising the former primary school – Ysgol Gynradd Gymraeg Garth Olwg and secondary school – Ysgol Gyfun Garth Olwg. There is also a pre-school nursery, a community library, Lifelong Learning Centre and a Youth Centre on site.

== Health ==
Church Village was the site of the East Glamorgan General Hospital, an ageing World War II hospital replaced in 2000 by the Royal Glamorgan Hospital in nearby Ynysmaerdy. It was later demolished.

== Religion ==
There are three Christian churches in the area, St. Illtud's, the Parish church, Capel Y Bedyddwyr Cymraeg Salem (Salem Welsh Baptist Chapel, with English and Welsh services) and Bethel Baptist Chapel. All three churches have a strong and healthy relationship between them which is constantly developing. The Parish church of St. Illtyd's has been serving the community for hundreds of years, but Salem and Bethel have developed in the last 100 years. Bethel was formed owing to schism, wishing for English services compared to the, then complete, Welsh Salem which was already established in the area. However, in the last 50 years Salem adopted an evening English service and is enjoying a morning family service under the current Pastor. Salem Chapel is widely known as the chapel (and resting place) of former Deacon and Arweinydd y gan, John Hughes, who wrote the famous hymn tune Cwm Rhondda (Guide Me, O Thou Great Jehovah).

== Governance ==
Church Village is also the name of an electoral ward to Rhondda Cynon Taf County Borough Council. It forms the immediate area around Church Village and Upper Church Village. The ward elects one county councillor. A 2018 review of electoral arrangements would see an increase in the number of councillors to two (and a realignment of the east boundary), effective from the 2022 council elections.

Church Village is also a community ward for Llantwit Fardre Community Council, electing four of the twelve community councillors.

== Climate ==
Area is characterised by equable climates with few extremes of temperature and ample precipitation in all months. The Köppen Climate Classification subtype for this climate is "Cfb". (Marine West Coast Climate).

Climate data for Church Village
Month	Jan	Feb	Mar	Apr	May	Jun	Jul	Aug	Sep	Oct	Nov	Dec	Year
Mean daily maximum °C (°F)	7 (45)	7 (45)	9 (48)	11 (52)	16 (61)	18 (64)	20 (68)	20 (68)	16 (61)	13 (55)	9 (48)	6 (43)	13 (55)
Mean daily minimum °C (°F)	3 (37)	2 (36)	4 (39)	4 (39)	8 (46)	10 (50)	13 (55)	12 (54)	9 (48)	7 (45)	5 (41)	3 (37)	7 (45)
Average precipitation days	21	17	19	17	11	14	14	14	16	16	19	18	196
Source: Weatherbase

== Notable people ==
See Category:People from Church Village
