= Upper Church Village =

District of Church Village in Southern Wales

Coordinates: 51.5717°N 3.3262°W

Upper Church Village is a district of the larger village and electoral ward of Church Village, within the community of Llantwit Fardre in Rhondda Cynon Taf, South Wales. It is located to the north and west of the villages of Llantwit Fardre, Church Village and Tonteg.
