= Treforest High Level railway station =

Former railway station in Wales

Treforest High Level

General information
- Location: Treforest, Rhondda Cynon Taf; Wales
- Coordinates: 51.5856°N 3.3257°W
- Grid reference: ST082882
- Platforms: 2

Other information
- Status: Disused

History
- Original company: Barry Railway
- Pre-grouping: Barry Railway
- Post-grouping: Great Western Railway

Key dates
- 16 March 1896: Station opened as Treforest
- 1 July 1924: Renamed Treforest High Level
- 5 May 1930: Station closed
Location

Treforest High Level railway station was located north of Llantwit Road in Treforest. The station consisted of two platforms with four lines – two central running lines while the platforms were on loops at this point.

== History ==
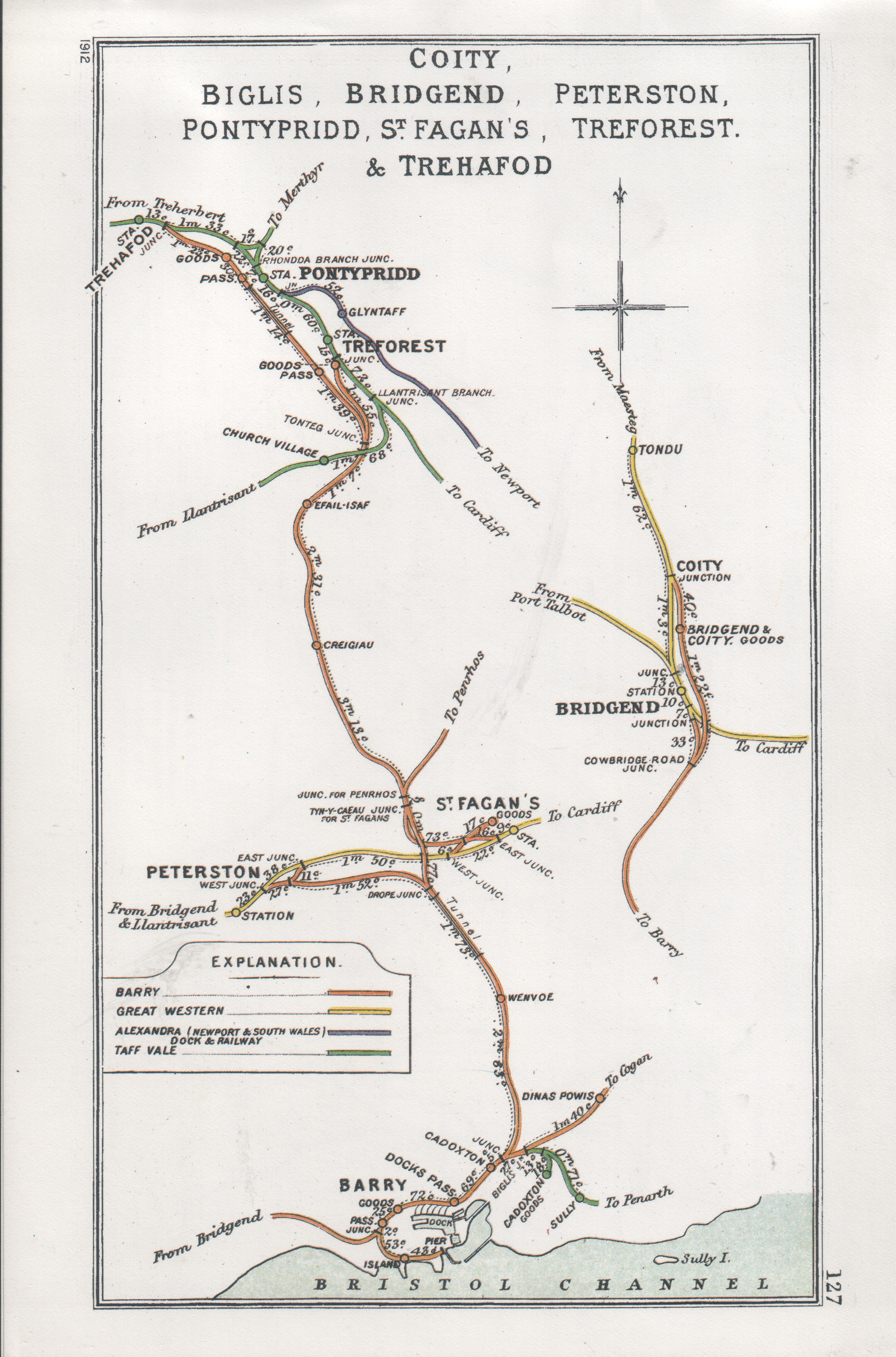
A 1912 Railway Clearing House Junction Diagram showing railways in the vicinity of Treforest (upper left). Barry Railway in orange; Taff Vale Railway in green.

The station was opened by the Barry Railway on 16 March 1896.

The Barry Railway was amalgamated with the Great Western Railway on 1 January 1922, along with the Taff Vale Railway (TVR) and several others; and the station was renamed Treforest High Level on 1 July 1924, to avoid confusion with the former TVR station, which had also been named Treforest, and which was renamed Treforest Low Level at the same time.

The station consisted of two platforms on the outer of the four tracks running through it. The location of the former station was 13miles-66chains from Cadoxton South Junction (east of Barry) and just 31 chains (682 yards) further on to the north-west, is the south-east portal of the now bricked up 1323-yard Graig (or Pwllgwaun) tunnel. Part of the former double line trackbed leading to the tunnel is now a car park associated with the University campus at Treforest.

Passenger services along the former Barry line north of Tonteg Junction were diverted via Pontypridd Central (also on the former TVR) and Treforest Low Level from 5 May 1930, and Treforest High Level station was closed.

A signal box existed here and that was closed on 15 March 1934. The line from Trehafod (Hafod Junction) to Tonteg Junction was closed in June 1951 and taken out of use on 9 February 1958. The remainder of the former Barry Railway branch between Treforest Junction, Tonteg Junction and Cadoxton South Junction, remained in use until closure of the through route in September 1963.

The up line between here and Tonteg Junction was closed temporarily for the storage of American S-160 steam locomotives between October 1943 and September 1944.

== Modern day ==
Nothing remains of this station and the site is occupied by a police vehicle maintenance depot. The main entrance was however situated approximately at the end of Hilda Street, Trefforest - some steps still remain.

Preceding station	Disused railways	Following station
Pontypridd Graig; Line and station closed	Barry Railway; Porth-Barry	Tonteg Halt; Line and station closed
