= Tonteg Halt railway station =

Former railway station in Wales

Tonteg Halt
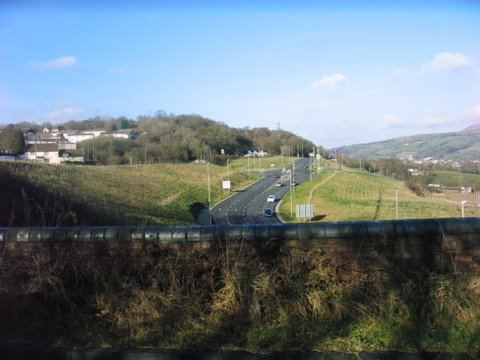
- Tonteg Halt looking towards Tonteg from former station/road bridge

General information
- Location: Tonteg, Rhondda Cynon Taf; Wales
- Coordinates: 51.5688°N 3.3050°W
- Grid reference: ST096863
- Platforms: (1st sta) 1; (2nd sta) 3

Other information
- Status: Disused

History
- Original company: Taff Vale Railway
- Pre-grouping: Taff Vale Railway
- Post-grouping: Great Western Railway

Key dates
- 1 May 1905: First station opened as Tonteg Platform
- 1 October 1923: Renamed Tonteg Halt
- 5 May 1930: Station resited
- 31 March 1952: Platform on ex-TVR line closed
- 10 September 1962: Station closed
Location

Tonteg Halt refers to two railway stations serving the township of Tonteg in Rhondda Cynon Taf, Wales. They were located on the Llantrisant and Taff Vale Junction Railway and latterly on the Barry Railway under the Great Western Railway.

== Tonteg Halt (TVR) 1905-1930 ==
The station on the Taff Vale/Llantrisant and Taff Vale Junction Railway was opened on 1 May 1905, originally being named Tonteg Platform; and extended in length on 7 October 1910. The station consisted of a single platform accessed via a still existing footpath from the road. Immediately to the east of the station was a small stone bridge over said road. On 1 October 1923, it was renamed Tonteg Halt. This station existed until 5 May 1930 when it was closed along with the line from Tonteg Viaduct to Llantrisant Junction because of the construction of a chord from Tonteg Viaduct to Tonteg Junction to connect with the Barry Railway. This new chord was brought into use on 5 May 1930, at the same time the chord to Llantrisant Junction closed.

Nothing remains of this halt after the construction of the Church Village bypass. According to photographs, the site was recognisable as a station, though barely around 1950.

== Tonteg Halt (Barry Railway) 1905 ==
A station called Tonteg Halt existed at Tonteg Junction on the Barry Railway for the month of May in 1905 (1.5.1905-31.5.1905). The station consisted of two platforms. A signal box existed here for Tonteg Junction.

== Tonteg Halt 1930-1962 ==
This new station opened on 5 May 1930 at Tonteg Junction after the short branch to Llantrisant Junction on the Taff Vale Railway was closed and the route realigned through Tonteg Junction. The station consisted at this time of three platforms, one the Pontypridd-Llantrisant branch and two offset platforms on the Barry Railway. Small shelters were provided and access was from the road bridge crossing the station at this point.

There were sidings both on the Barry line to the south-west and also at the junction area to the east, these latter sidings were closed on 20 April 1958.

Trains coming from Llantrisant had no direct access across the rail junction to the Trehafod line.

The Trehafod line closed in 1951 and was taken out of use in 1958. Two dates are given for the closure of Tonteg Halt, the first being 31 March 1952 which refers to the Pontypridd-Llantrisant platform (though according to timetables, trains still stopped here on this line), and final closure of the lines and whole station occurred on 10 September 1962.

The Barry Railway route through the station officially closed on 2 December 1963 and the Llantrisant branch on 28 September 1964.

== Services ==
The GWR 1949 timetable shows services over both the Llantrisant and Taff Vale and Barry lines. A typical week day saw 8 services to Llantrisant, 3 services to Barry Island, 1 to Barry, 1 to Cardiff General, 3 to Cardiff Clarence Road and a total of 17 services returning to Pontypridd.

== Modern day ==
The immediate area of the station still exists but the original site of Tonteg Junction and sidings have been removed for the construction of the Church Village bypass. The original station area and road bridge can be seen from Tonteg now that clearance of land, landscaping and the construction of the Church Village by-pass has been completed, though the rail junction area has been extensively landscaped (comparisons with photographs in the external links section can be made).

The original TVR halt can be accessed using a gate onto a footpath at Pount Farm Lane. The area is extensively overgrown and little discernable trace is left. No trace of the bridge over Pound Farm Lane exists anymore. The bridge abutments were still extant until the construction of the bypass.

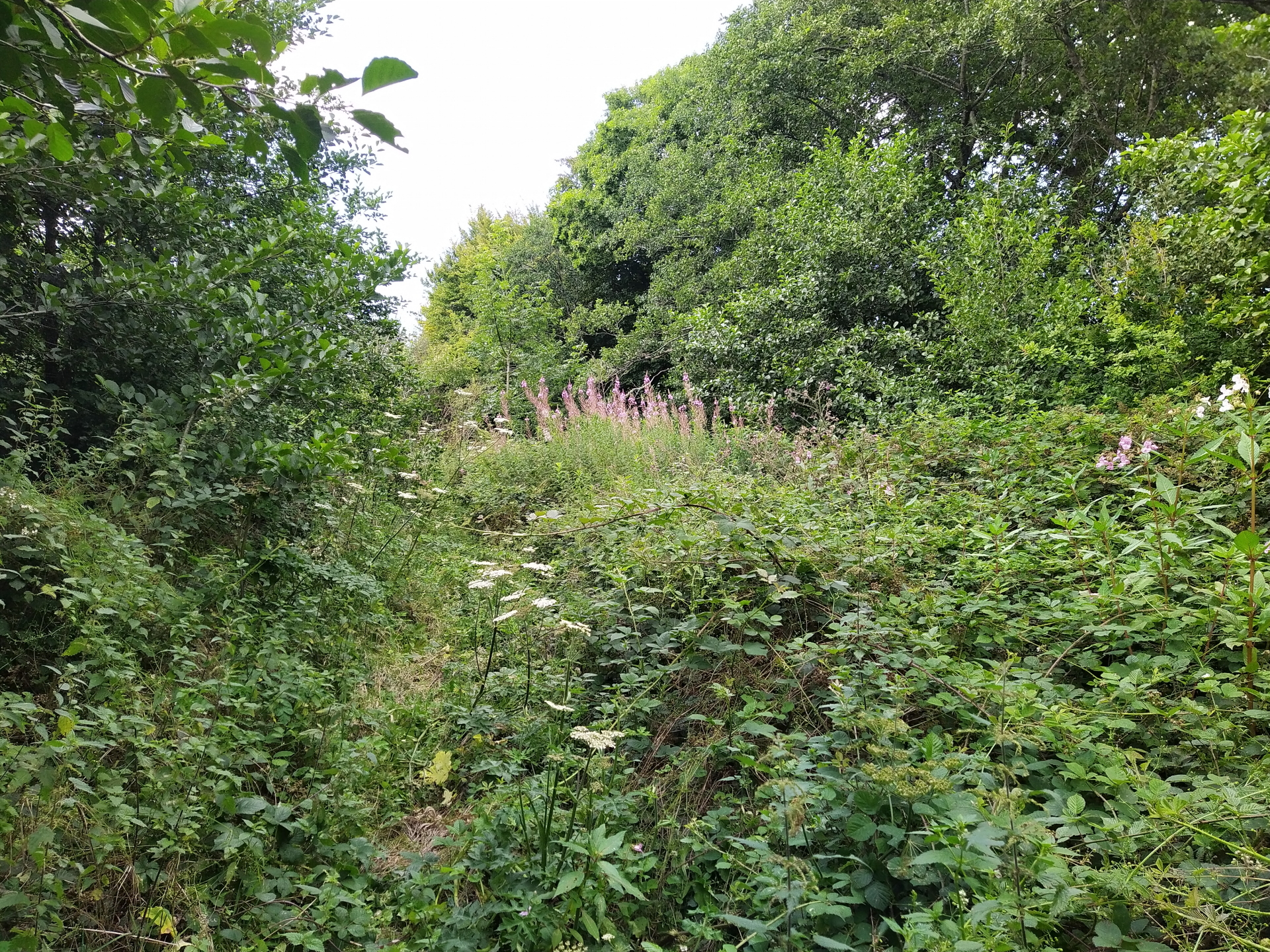
Tonteg Halt (TVR) 1905–1930 in 2020

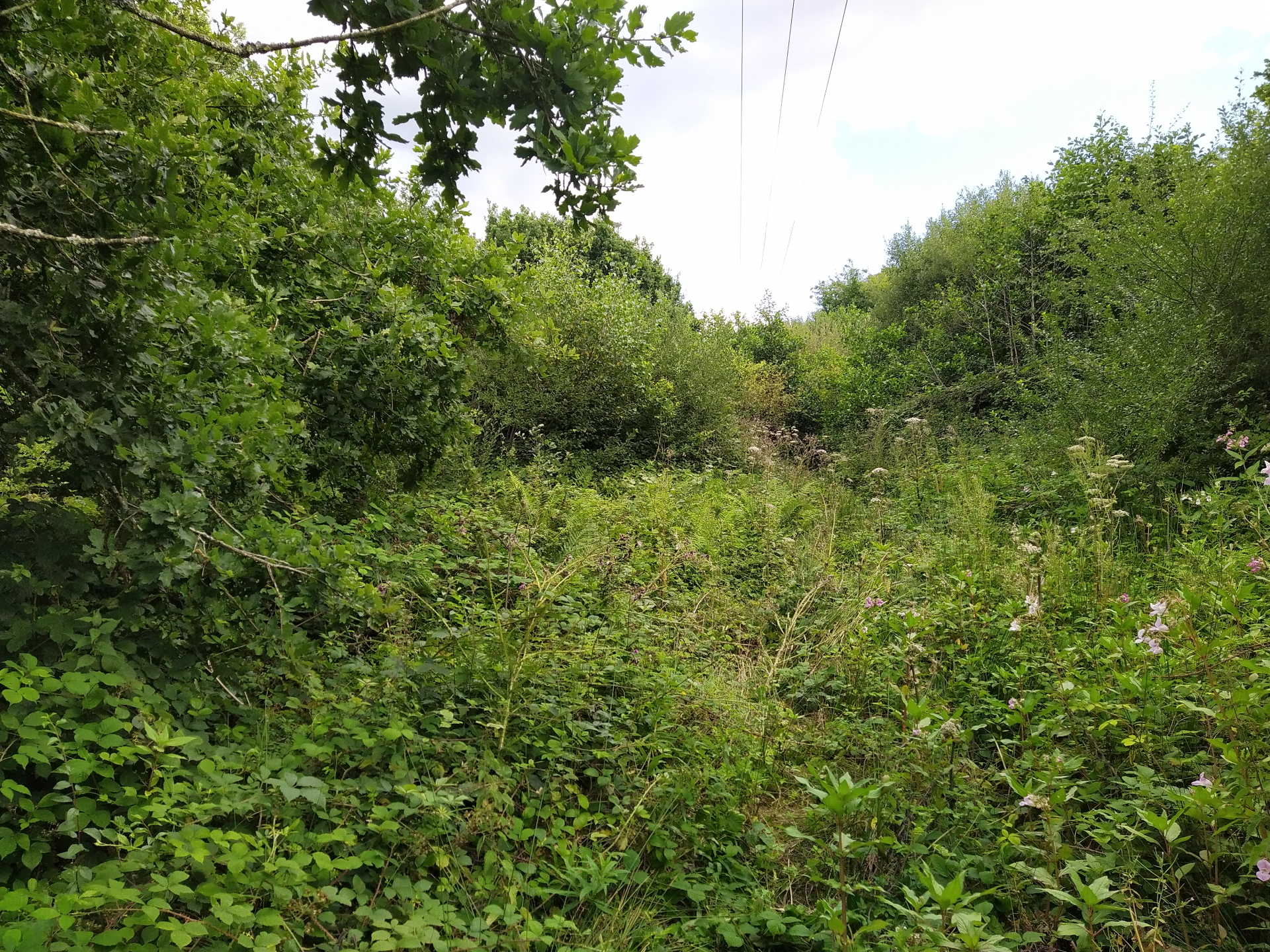
Tonteg Halt (TVR) 1905–1930 in 2020

Preceding station	Disused railways	Following station
Treforest; Line closed, station open	Llantrisant and Taff Vale Junction Railway; Pontypridd-Llantrisant	Church Village; Line and station closed
Treforest; Line closed, station open	Great Western Railway; Porth-Barry	Efail Isaf; Line and station closed
Treforest High Level; Line and station closed	Barry Railway; Porth-Barry	Efail Isaf; Line and station closed
