= Wenvoe railway station =

Former railway station in Wales

Wenvoe
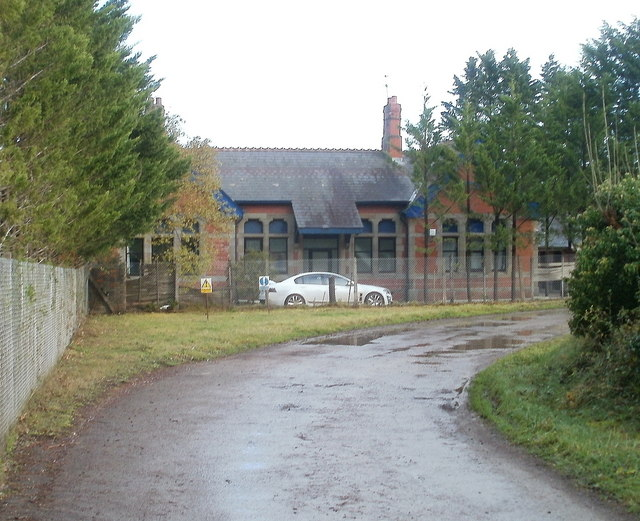

General information
- Location: Wenvoe, Vale of Glamorgan; Wales
- Coordinates: 51.4516°N 3.2564°W
- Grid reference: ST128732
- Platforms: 2

Other information
- Status: Disused

History
- Original company: Barry Railway
- Pre-grouping: Barry Railway
- Post-grouping: Great Western Railway

Key dates
- 16 March 1896: Station opened
- 10 September 1962: Station closed
Location

Wenvoe railway station is a former railway station in Wenvoe in south Wales. It was on the Barry Railway between Creigiau and Cadoxton, which ran broadly north–south through Wenvoe. It had two platforms with passing loops to the south on both the up and down lines for goods and mineral trains to allow passenger trains to pass. To the north of the station was Wenvoe Tunnel, 1 mile and 108 yards long emerging just before Drope Junction. The northern portal is located slightly to the west of the A4232 by-pass.

The station closed in 1962 and the line was abandoned six months later. The site of the station buildings and yard is now a private residence and is not accessible to the public.

Preceding station	Disused railways	Following station
St-y-Nyll Platform; Line and station closed	Barry Railway; Trehafod-Cadoxton	Cadoxton line and station open

External images
- Photo of former railway station building, Wenvoe from Geograph Britain and Ireland
- Photo of The Old Station, Wenvoe from Geograph Britain and Ireland
- Photo of Wenvoe station when in use from Flickr
