= HMS Snaefell =

Clyde-built paddle steamer (1907 - 1941)

History
- Name: PS Barry (1907–1917); HMS Barryfield (1917–1918); PS Barry (1918–1926); PS Waverley (1926–1939); HMS Snaefell (1939–1941)
- Owner: Barry Railway Company (1907–1907); Bristol Channel Passenger Boats (1907–1911); P & A Campbell (1911–1941)
- Operator: Royal Navy (1917–1918); Royal Navy (1939–1941)
- Builder: John Brown & Company, Clydebank
- Launched: 4 May 1907
- Fate: Bombed and sunk, 5 July 1941

General characteristics
- Type: Paddle steamer
- Tonnage: 466

HMS Snaefell was a paddle steamer, built at John Brown & Company's Clydebank shipyard for the Barry Railway Company and launched in 1907 as the PS Barry. Built to serve as a pleasure steamer carrying passengers on the Bristol Channel, she was quickly transferred to the ownership of Bristol Channel Passenger Boats which in 1911 became part of P & A Campbell.

She was requisitioned by the Royal Navy during World War I and renamed HMS Barryfield serving during the Gallipoli Campaign where she was the last British ship to leave Suvla Bay evacuating British soldiers. After the war she returned to passenger service in November 1919 under the name Barry, was refitted in 1920 and renamed PS Waverley in 1925.

Requisitioned by the Royal Navy at the outbreak of World War II she was renamed again in 1939, this time to HMS Snaefell to avoid confusion with another paddle steamer Waverley which had already been requisitioned from London and North Eastern Railway, and assigned to the 8th Minesweeping Flotilla. She was one of the flotilla of ships at the Dunkirk evacuation making two trips across the channel, credited with rescuing 981 soldiers and freeing another ship which had run aground, the Glen Gower. Sunk by a German Luftwaffe bomber on 5 July 1941 with three fatalities but her other nine crew rescued, her wreck was located off the coast of Sunderland in 2010.
