= St-y-Nyll Platform railway station =

Short-lived railway station in St Brides-super-Ely, Vale of Glamorgan

St-y-Nyll

General information
- Location: St. Brides-super-Ely, Vale of Glamorgan; Wales
- Coordinates: 51.4953°N 3.2741°W
- Grid reference: ST116781

Other information
- Status: Disused

History
- Original company: Barry Railway
- Pre-grouping: Barry Railway

Key dates
- 1 May 1905: Opened
- 20 November 1905: Closed
Location

St-y-Nyll railway station, also known as St-y-Nyll Platform railway station or St-y-Nyll Halt railway station, served the village of St. Brides-super-Ely, Vale of Glamorgan, Wales, in 1905 on the Barry Docks Railway.

== History ==
The station was opened on 1 May 1905 by the Barry Railway. It was a very short-lived station, being open for six months before closing on 20 November 1905.

Preceding station	Disused railways	Following station
Wenvoe; Line and station closed	Great Western Railway; Barry Railway	Creigiau; Line and station closed
