= Church Village Halt railway station =

Former railway station in Wales

Church Village Halt
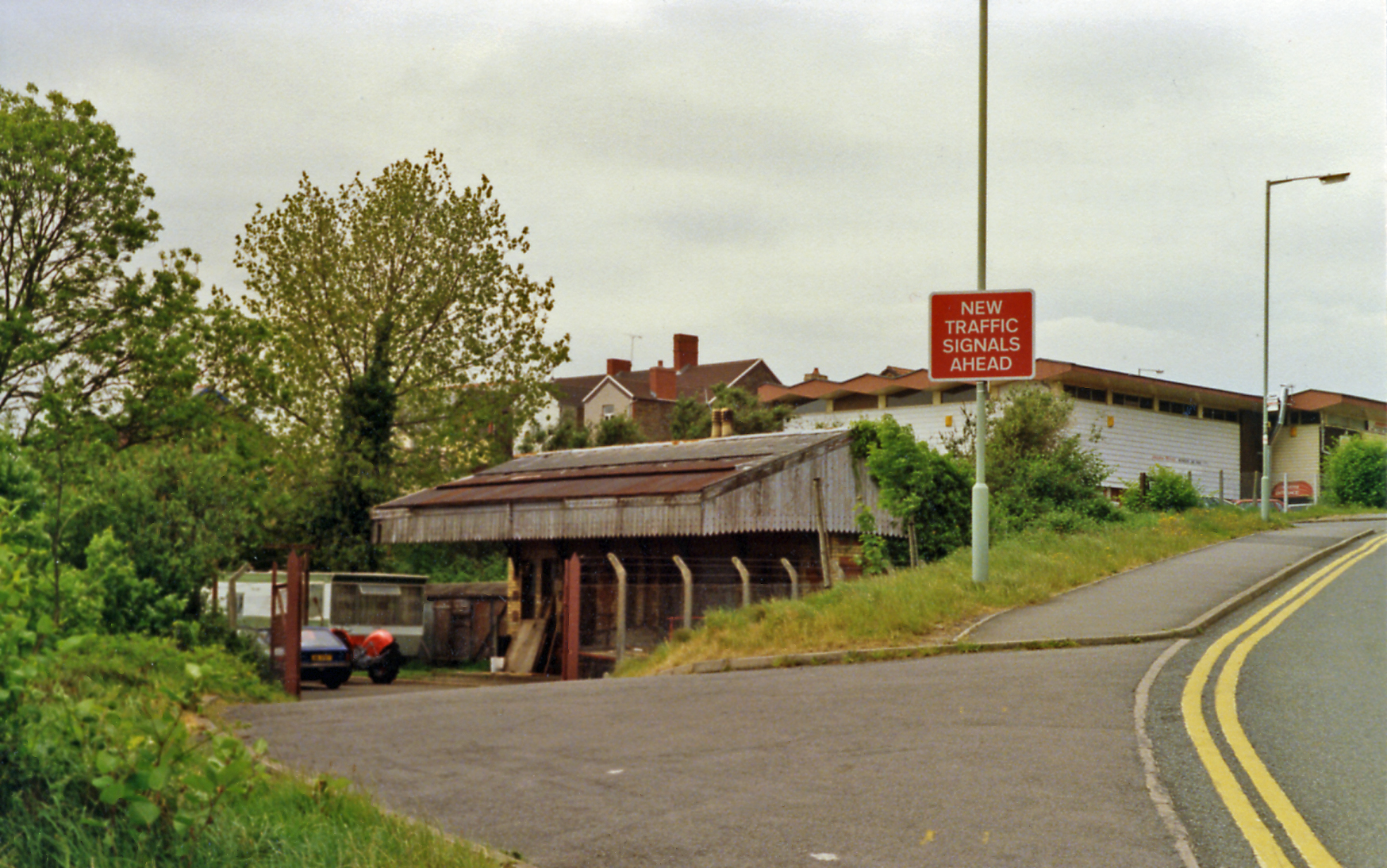
- Site of the station in 1990

General information
- Location: Church Village, Rhondda Cynon Taf; Wales
- Coordinates: 51.5641°N 3.3193°W
- Grid reference: ST086858
- Platforms: 1

Other information
- Status: Disused

History
- Original company: Llantrisant and Taff Vale Junction Railway
- Pre-grouping: Taff Vale Railway
- Post-grouping: Great Western Railway

Key dates
- 1 October 1887: Station opened as Church Village
- 14 March 1932: Renamed Church Village Halt
- 31 March 1952: Station closed
Location

Church Village Halt railway station was a small halt on the Llantrisant and Taff Vale Junction Railway. The station was just south of the crossroads in the village on the road to Efail Isaf.

The station consisted of a single platform and station buildings to the immediate west of Station Road, which crossed the railway on a small bridge. To the immediate east of the bridge were sidings and a tramway to Taff Llantwit colliery. A signal box operated the sidings at the site.

== Modern day ==
The site of the station is now covered with housing development. The area of the sidings to the east of the station is open ground used for keeping animals. No trace remains of the tramway and colliery being built over in 2006–2007 with modern housing, though even before this little trace existed.

Preceding station	Disused railways	Following station
Tonteg Halt; Line and station closed	Llantrisant and Taff Vale Junction Railway; Pontypridd-Llantrisant	Llantwit Fardre; Line and station closed
