= PS Devonia =

Steam Ferry

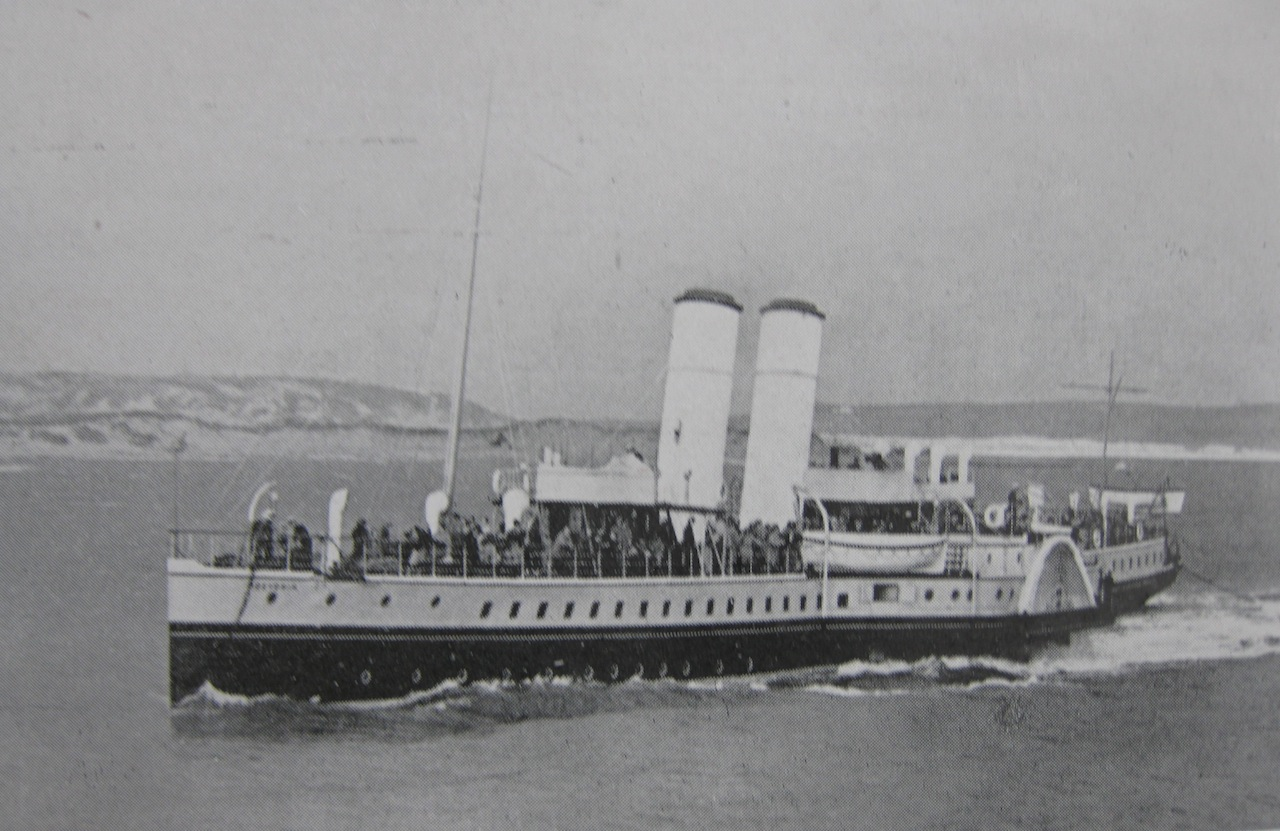
- Devonia underway in Bristol Channel

History

Great Britain
- Name: PS Devonia; HMS Devonia
- Owner: Barry Railway Company; P and A Campbell
- Route: Bristol Channel
- Builder: John Brown Shipyard, Clydebank
- Yard number: 369
- Launched: 22 March 1905
- Fate: Damaged by aircraft and abandoned

General characteristics
- Type: Paddle steamer
- Tonnage: 641 GRT
- Length: 245' (75 m)
- Beam: 29' (8.8 m)
- Draft: 9'8" (2.9 m)
- Installed power: 208 or 325 hp
- Speed: 16 knots (18 mph)

PS Devonia was a paddle steamer. She was launched in 1905, sailing in the Bristol Channel and English Channel, being a minesweeper in both world wars, until she was damaged by aircraft while evacuating soldiers from Dunkirk, forced to beach, and was abandoned.

== Career ==
Devonia started under the Barry Railway Co., though legally she could only sail from Barry, so she was registered in company executives' names, and then through the related Red Funnel Line, and she was used for excursion travel in the Bristol Channel. She was sold briefly to Bristol Channel Boats, and then sold on to P. and A. Campbell in 1911, after P. & A. Campbell had driven the Barry Railway out of business.

In World War I she served as a minesweeper on the east coast of the UK, and returned to P and A Campbell after the war. She was in Royal Navy service from September 1914 to June 1919, along with her sister ship Gwalia, later renamed to Brighton Queen. Worked south of England from 1923 until 1932, on routes from Brighton, Eastbourne and Hastings to Boulogne and Calais, and thence (from 1932) in the Bristol Channel until she was laid up in 1939.

She was requisitioned in World War II in October 1939 and made a minesweeper in the Royal Navy, where she worked east of Scotland. She went to Dunkirk to help the evacuation of the British Expeditionary Forces, and was attacked by aircraft on 30 May 1940 and abandoned.

== Loss ==
She was near the Dunkirk beach on 30 May when Luftwaffe aircraft attacked her, and by explosion, caused damage to her stern, forcing her to beach. Her captain was ordered to beach her high on the shore so that she might serve as a pier to embark soldiers to other ships.

Her sister Gwalia (renamed Brighton Queen) was sunk near Dunkirk the next day.

== Design ==
Devonia was an excursion ship, and had no sleeping arrangements for passengers, who had to doss down in the saloon if they wished to sleep on overnight trips.

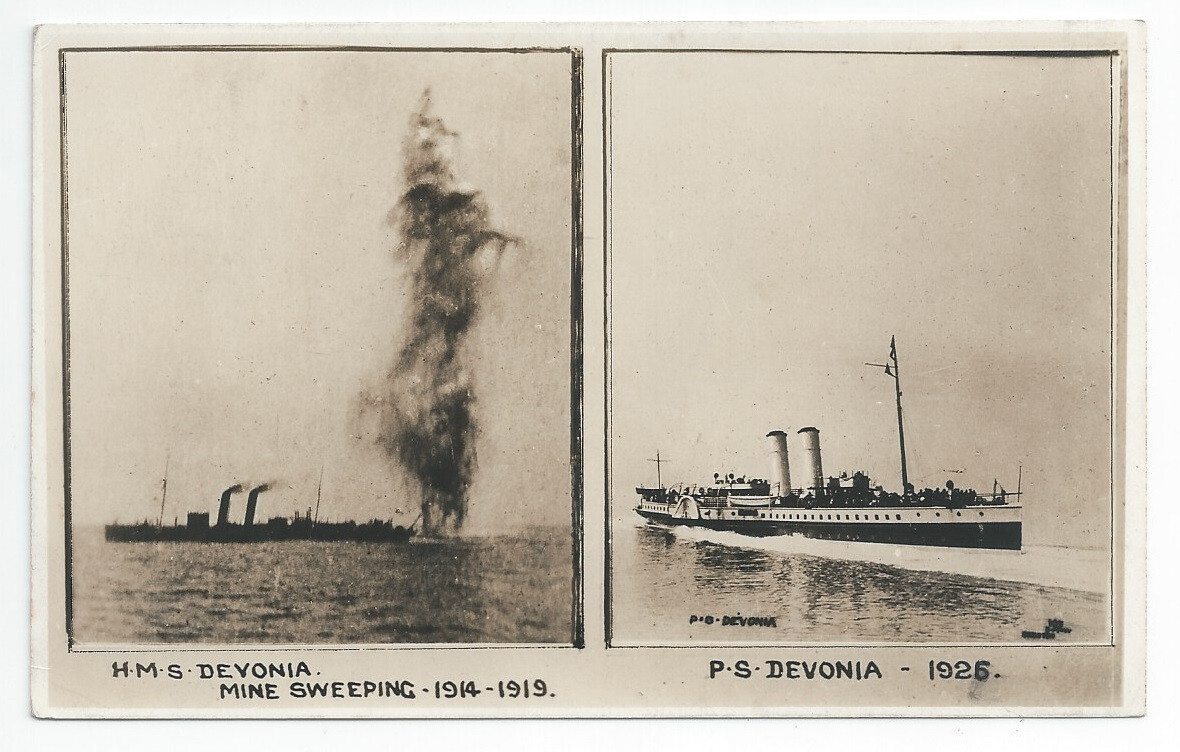
PS Devonia Minesweeping during WWI
