= Tonteg =

Coordinates: 51.5679°N 3.3080°W

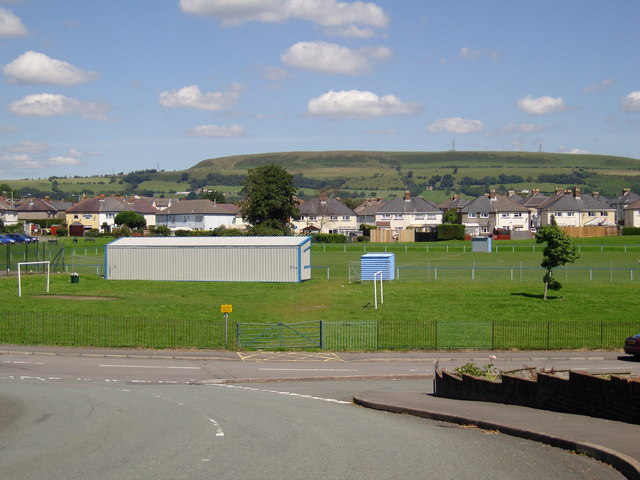

- Location within Rhondda Cynon Taf
- Population: 4,098 (2011 ward)
- Community: Llantwit Fardre
- Principal area: Rhondda Cynon Taf
- Preserved county: Mid Glamorgan
- Country: Wales
- Sovereign state: United Kingdom
- Post town: Pontypridd
- Postcode district: CF38
- Police: South Wales
- Fire: South Wales
- Ambulance: Welsh
- UK Parliament: Pontypridd
- Senedd Cymru – Welsh Parliament: Pontypridd

Tonteg is a village in Rhondda Cynon Taf in South Wales. It is 4 miles (6.4 km) from Pontypridd, 9 miles (14.5 km) north west of Cardiff and 4 miles (6.44 km) north east of Llantrisant. The village is within the community of Llantwit Fardre. Tonteg is to the north west of the Garth Mountain, on the west side of the River Taff valley, at the top of a hill known locally as Powerstation Hill. The hill gets its name from the Upper Boat power station which was situated at the bottom of the hill until it was demolished in 1972. Tonteg is next to Church Village and the boundaries between the two villages are blurred. A significant part of the Treforest Industrial Estate falls within the Willowford area of Tonteg.

== Toponymy ==
The name of the village occurs in a number of forms: Tonteg, Ton teg, Ton-teg and on some older maps as Ton-têg or Twyn-teg. Tonteg is now seen on the village sign, however some other signs say Ton-Teg. The name means "Beautiful hill" when translated from Welsh, deriving not from the Welsh for "wave" (ton) as might be thought, but rather from the word "twyn". Indeed, a farm on the Black Road above the nearby Church Village is named Dan-y-twyn ("Beneath the hill"). It could also be related to the toponym ton as seen in Tonna.

== Castle/Motte ==
The village has a fairly well preserved 12th-century motte castle with an intact moat called Tomen-Y-Clawdd or Coed-Y-Twr. To locals this fort situated in Ffordd Gerdinan is commonly known as the Monkey Tump

== Hospital ==
Tonteg Hospital is situated north of the village, now surrounded by housing estates. It was originally an isolation hospital treating contagious diseases. Nowadays it provides mental health care and other services. No emergency services are provided.

The Priory Hospital Church Village is an adult female hospital specialising in learning disabilities and mental healthcare.

== Schools ==
Gwauncelyn Primary School serves the local community.

== Shopping ==
Two main areas of local businesses exist along Main Road through the village and in the centre of one of the housing estates (Cardigan Close area).

== Transport ==
There are bus services to Beddau, Cardiff, Pontypridd, Talbot Green and Royal Glamorgan Hospital.

Tonteg used to have at differing times two stations – both called Tonteg Halt railway station – on two former railway lines that ran nearby; Barry Railway and the Llantrisant and Taff Vale Junction Railway. After 1930 the original Tonteg Halt was moved to Tonteg Junction after track rationalisation; the name Tonteg Halt was used for this station.

The existence of the railways in the area around Power Station Hill has been obliterated by the Church Village bypass (described below), though some remnants exist between Tonteg and Treforest and to the south of the village towards Church Village.

There existed plans for a new station to be built on the remaining Pontypridd-Cardiff line between Treforest and Treforest Estate to serve the village, although its location would have been at the bottom of Power Station Hill and access to the village difficult.

== Bypass ==
Rhondda Cynon Taf, the local authority, has constructed a bypass to reduce traffic congestion on the A473, Pontypridd to Bridgend (Welsh: Penybont ar Ogwr) road, at Tonteg, Church Village (Welsh: Pentre'r Eglwys) and Llantwit Fardre (Welsh: Llanilltud Faerdref). The Church Village bypass, as it is known, is built as a single carriageway, with crawler and overtaking lanes around roundabouts and was completed in Autumn 2010.

== Governance ==
Tonteg is represented on Rhondda Cynon Taf County Borough Council by two county councillors from the electoral ward of Tonteg. The ward comprises the eastern strip of the Llantwit Fardre community, including the Tonteg village, Treforest Industrial Estate in the north and Gedrys Farm in the south. A 2018 review of electoral arrangements, if accepted, would see a decrease in the number of councillors to one, effective from the 2022 council elections.

Tonteg is also the name of a community ward for Llantwit Fardre Community Council, electing three of the thirteen community councillors.
