= Prince of Wales Orthopaedic Hospital, Rhydlafar =

Former hospital in Cardiff, Wales

Prince of Wales Orthopaedic Hospital
- Shown in Cardiff

Geography
- Location: Cardiff, Wales, United Kingdom
- Coordinates: 51.5131°N 3.2808°W

Organisation
- Care system: Public NHS
- Type: Specialist

Services
- Emergency department: No Accident & Emergency
- Speciality: Orthopaedic

History
- Founded: 1914
- Closed: 1998

Links
- Lists: Hospitals in Wales

The Prince of Wales Orthopaedic Hospital (Welsh: Ysbyty Orthopedig Tywysog Cymru) was a specialist orthopaedic hospital in Rhydlafar, Cardiff, Wales.

== History ==
The hospital was established in 1917 by Sir John Lynn-Thomas, in James Howell House, formerly a domestic house and lodging house in The Walk, Cardiff. It was originally named the Wales and Monmouthshire Hospital for Limbless Sailors and Soldiers. To mark the opening, a cromlech was erected in the front garden by Lynn-Thomas. The gardens were further landscaped, with artificial hills being made so patients with new limbs could practice walking up and down various inclines. In 1918 Lynn-Thomas began considering widening access to the hospital to civilians after a census found that 1 in every 810 civilians in Wales lived without one limb.

The Prince of Wales visited the hospital in 1918, officially opening it and leading it to be renamed to the Prince of Wales Hospital. During his visit, over £24,000 was raised by attendees with the goal of opening the hospital to civilians when war demands reduced. In 1921, the hospital began accepting both adult and children civilian patients. During this time the hospital became known as the Prince of Wales Hospital for the Limbless and Crippled. The hospital opened a school for the younger patients in 1927.

In 1930 the hospital took over a large mansion in the Crossways Estate, Llanblethian. The Crossway's site had 72 beds, but demand during Second World War soon outstripped the amount of available beds. In 1953 the hospital moved to the partially derelict site of a former American military hospital in Rhydlafar. In time, the hospital became a centre of excellence in the treatment of orthopaedic patients, and the National Blood Transfusion Service (Wales) relocated to the site in 1956. During this time there were 14 wards, accommodating around 300 patients. Each ward had its own patio area, allowing for the patients to be wheeled outside for fresh air. In later years, students were sent to the hospital for their orthopaedic training. However, the hospital was threatened with closure on a number of occasions and, after services had been transferred to other hospitals in the area, it finally closed in 1998.

The site previously occupied by the hospital is now a housing development on a landscaped site with a children's playground.
