= Efail Isaf =

Coordinates: 51.551°N 3.320°W

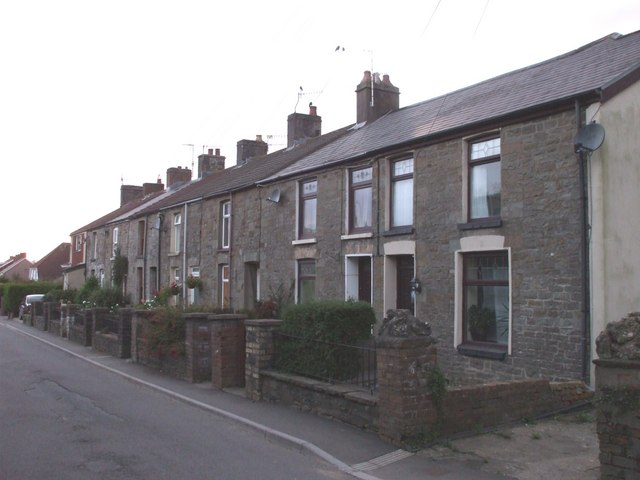

- Location within Rhondda Cynon Taf
- Principal area: Rhondda Cynon Taf
- Preserved county: Mid Glamorgan
- Country: Wales
- Sovereign state: United Kingdom
- Post town: PONTYPRIDD
- Postcode district: CF38
- Dialling code: 01443
- Police: South Wales
- Fire: South Wales
- Ambulance: Welsh
- UK Parliament: Pontypridd

Efail Isaf is a village located to the south of Llantwit Fardre in south Wales. It is located in the County Borough of Rhondda Cynon Taf. The former Barry Railway ran nearby. Efail Isaf has a village hall

== Toponymy ==
Efail Isaf derives from the Welsh efail, meaning forge and isaf, meaning lower.

== Religion ==
Capel y Tabernacl - Tabernacl Chapel is the only place of worship in the village. The congregation started meeting in the back room of the Carpenters Arms in the 1840s, and by 1870 had built the chapel on its current site. By 1970, its membership had dwindled to very small numbers and the members were considering the closure of the chapel - exactly a century after its opening. However, from 1970 the chapel experienced growing congregations and its members now take active roles in the wide range of local organisations and charities. There are two welcoming congregations - one that meets in Welsh and the other in English. The Welsh language congregation, of around 200 members, and has an active Sunday School and youth work. The English language congregation, of around 20 members, is very welcoming and also holds regular activities in the village. Over recent years, the chapel has become a focal point for a significant amount of fund raising for charities - providing support for local and global projects.

The members' covenant of Tabernacl Efail Isaf is: We are a community of people who have come together voluntarily to seek to grow in our shared understanding and our ability to exercise the teachings and spirit of Jesus.

In 2008, the members of the chapel decided to renovate the old vestry, built at the end of the 1890s to turn it into a community facility. The project was completed in summer 2010, at a cost of around £450,000. The chapel itself was then renovated and provides an excellent place for concerts and lectures in addition to its function as a place for chapel services, weddings and funerals.

== In the media ==
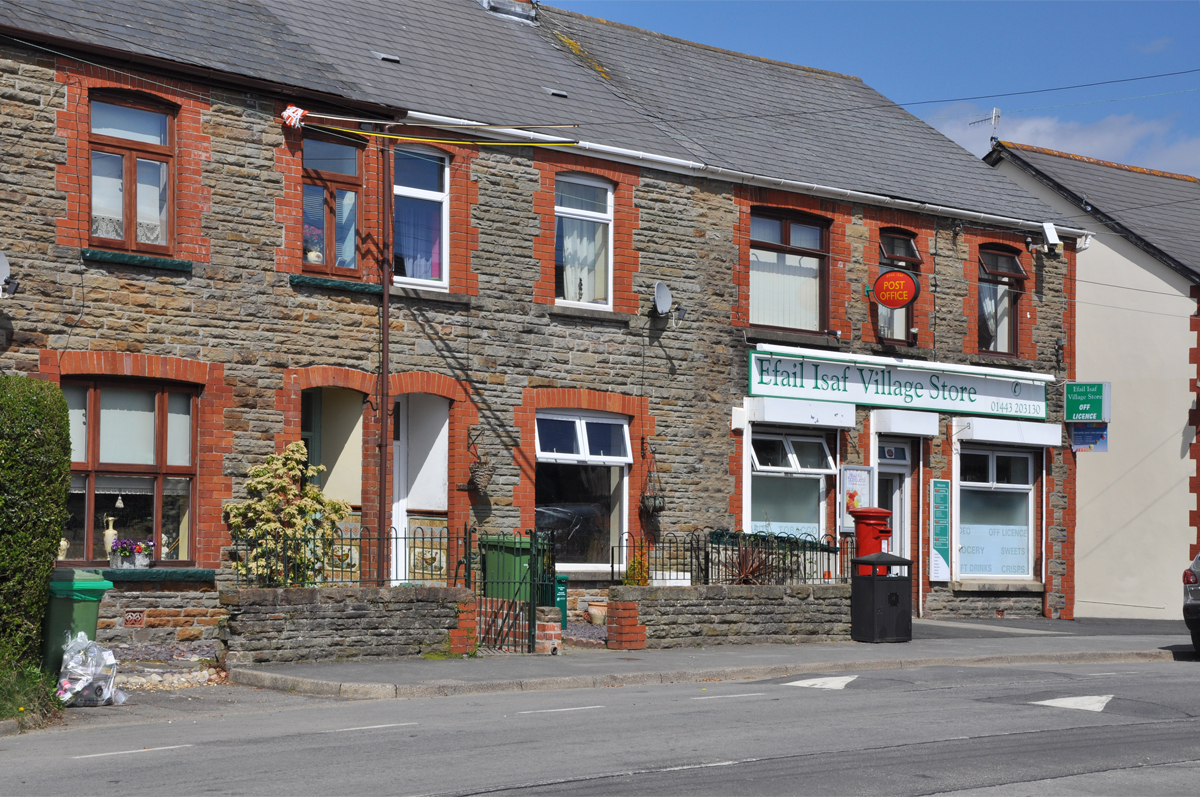
Efail Isaf Village Shop.

The local village shop, was operating at a loss as of January 2019 and the owners considering closure. Villagers made a pledge to purchase five items per week to keep the shop open.

== Parks and Playgrounds ==
Efail Isaf has several parks and playgrounds. This includes Park Nant Celyn, Celyn Paddocks and Efail Isaf Village Green behind the village hall.

== Walks ==
Efail Isaf has new footpaths since the installation of the Church Village By-Pass, which changed many existing routes. A popular route is to cross the bridge between Station Road and Heol-y-Parc, through Celyn Paddocks before visiting the Efail Isaf Village Green on the way to the Woodland Walk area to rejoin the By-Pass footpath.
