= Llantwit Fardre =

Llantwit Fardre: Welsh: Llanilltud Faerdref
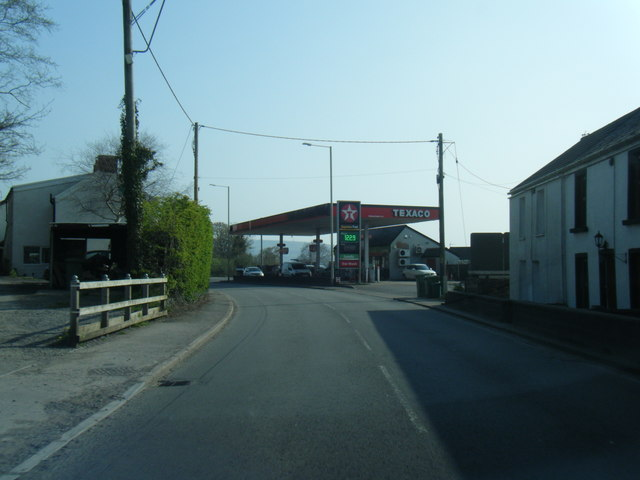
- Llantrisant Road, Llantwid Fardre

- Location within Rhondda Cynon Taf
- Population: 6,099 (2011 Ward)
- OS grid reference: ST076851
- Principal area: Rhondda Cynon Taf
- Preserved county: Mid Glamorgan
- Country: Wales
- Sovereign state: United Kingdom
- Post town: PONTYPRIDD
- Postcode district: CF38
- Dialling code: 01443
- Police: South Wales
- Fire: South Wales
- Ambulance: Welsh
- UK Parliament: Pontypridd
- Senedd Cymru – Welsh Parliament: Pontypridd
- List of places UK Wales Rhondda Cynon Taf 51.5578°N 3.3341°W Community map: Map of the community

Llantwit Fardre (Welsh: Llanilltud Faerdref) is a large village and community (and electoral ward) situated on the A473, Pontypridd to Bridgend, road near the Welsh towns of Pontypridd and Llantrisant. Llantwit Fardre is also the name of the old parish and the community area that takes in the villages of Llantwit Fardre, Tonteg and Church Village. It is in the county of Rhondda Cynon Taf.

The Welsh Government has constructed a bypass to reduce traffic congestion on the A473 road at Tonteg, Church Village and Llantwit Fardre. The Church Village bypass, as it is known, has been built as a single carriageway, with crawler and overtaking lanes around roundabouts, and was opened for traffic in September 2010.

== Etymology ==
It is believed the name Llantwit Fardre is derived from an old Welsh Language name meaning The Church of St Illtud (Llantwit), on the Home Farm of the Prince (Faerdref) and relates to the land surrendered to the prince of the District by his subject to provide him with an income. Saint Illtud was a 5th-century Celtic priest who built his second church roughly in the area where the present church stands. He was later famed as the Saint of the Five Keys of youth, learning, chivalry, priesthood and knighthood.

== History and amenities ==
The parish has a fairly well preserved 12th century motte castle with an intact moat, called Tomen-y-clawdd, which is located in the parish village of Tonteg. Coach company Edwards Coaches is based in the town, and was established in 1925.

A station called Llantwit Fardre (and formerly Llantwit Dyffryn Red Ash Colliery) served the village on the Llantrisant and Taff Vale Junction Railway.

== Employment ==
Industrialisation began in Llantwit Fardre in the late 17th century with the introduction of stone quarrying and coal mining. With the decline of coal mining the local populace tend to commute to work.

Between 1959 and 1973 Gilbern cars were manufactured in the village.

== Sport ==
Llantwit Fardre has rugby union, association football, cricket and netball clubs. Llantwit Fardre RFC are a rugby union team who play in the WRU Division 1 East Central; Llantwit Fardre AFC are a local football club that have a team playing in the South Wales Premier Football League.

== Local government ==
Llantwit Fardre is the name of a community ward for Llantwit Fardre Community Council, electing four of the twelve community councillors. Llantwit Fardre Parish Council was originally formed under the Local Government Act 1894, with the first meeting held on 1 January 1895. It became a community council in 1974, after local government re-organisation, when Welsh parish councils were re-titled. The council have the motto, "Goreu arf arf ddysg" ("The best tools are the tools for learning"), carved over the entrance to the Carnegie Hall.

Llantwit Fardre is also the name of a county ward to Rhondda Cynon Taf County Borough Council, with boundaries matching the community ward, covering Llantwit Fardre village and Efail Isaf. The ward elects two county councillors. On 2 May 2008, Joel James, a British Conservative Party politician became the first Tory councillor to be elected to the county council for the Llantwit Fardre seat.
