= Barry Railway Company =

Former railway and docks company in South Wales

Barry Railway

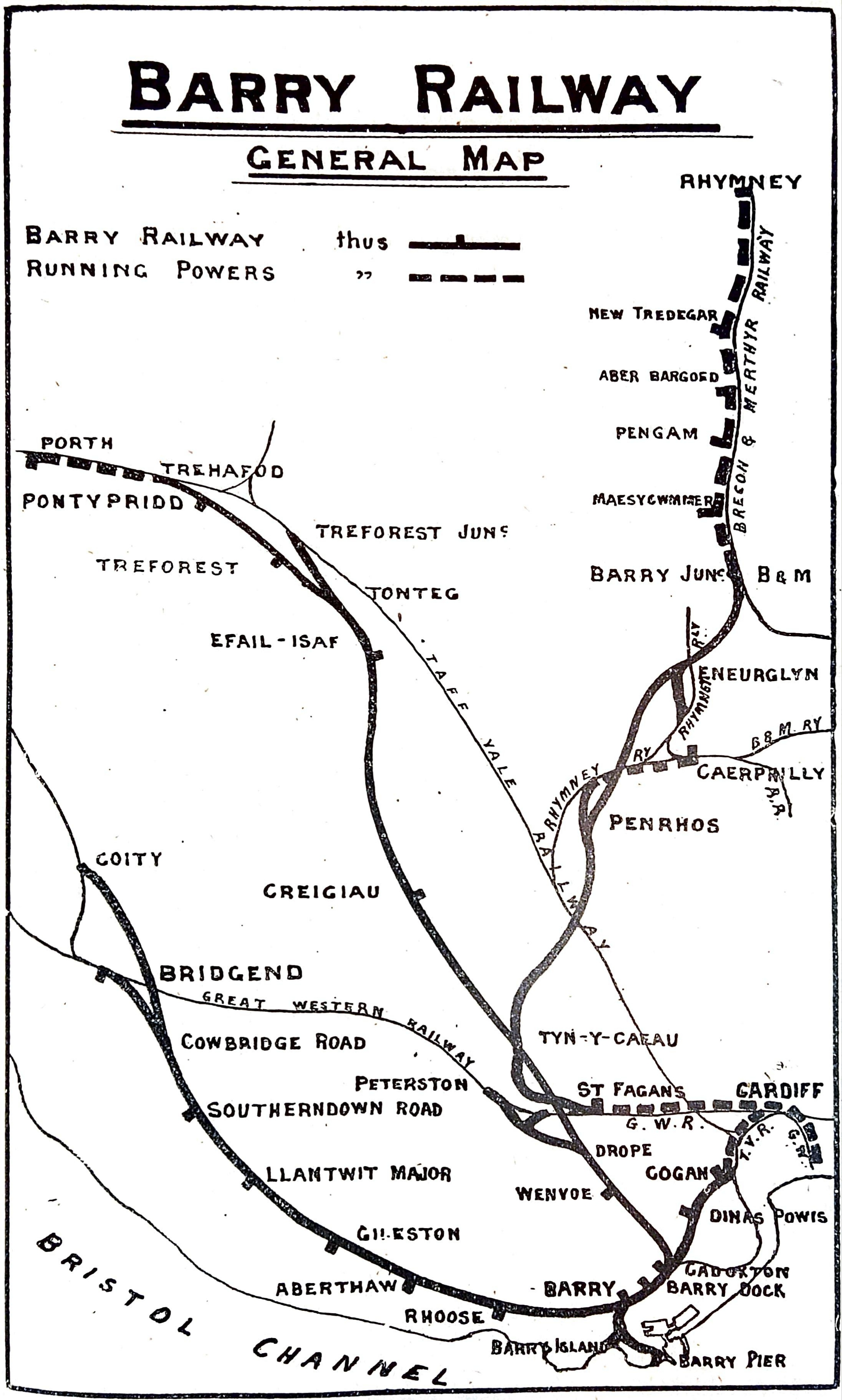
- 1920 map of the railway

Technical
- Track gauge: 4 ft 8 1/2 in (1,435 mm)
- Length: 67 miles 69 chains (109.2 km) (1919)
- Track length: 309 miles 57 chains (498.4 km) (1919)

The Barry Railway Company was a railway and docks company in South Wales, first incorporated as the Barry Dock and Railway Company in 1884. It arose out of frustration among Rhondda coal owners at congestion and high charges at Cardiff Docks as well the monopoly held by the Taff Vale Railway in transporting coal from the Rhondda. In addition, the Taff Vale did not have the required capacity for the mineral traffic using the route, leading to lengthy delays in getting to Cardiff.

The Barry Railway opened its main line from Trehafod in the Rhondda to Barry in 1889 and its first dock was opened in the same year, with modern loading equipment. It was immediately successful and principally carried coal, the tonnage increased year on year, so that by 1910 it had overtaken Cardiff as the largest export point of South Wales coal and in 1913, a world record of shipment of 11.09 million long tons (11.27 million tonnes) of coal were exported. Later it built costly branches to connect to the Rhymney and Brecon & Merthyr Railways.

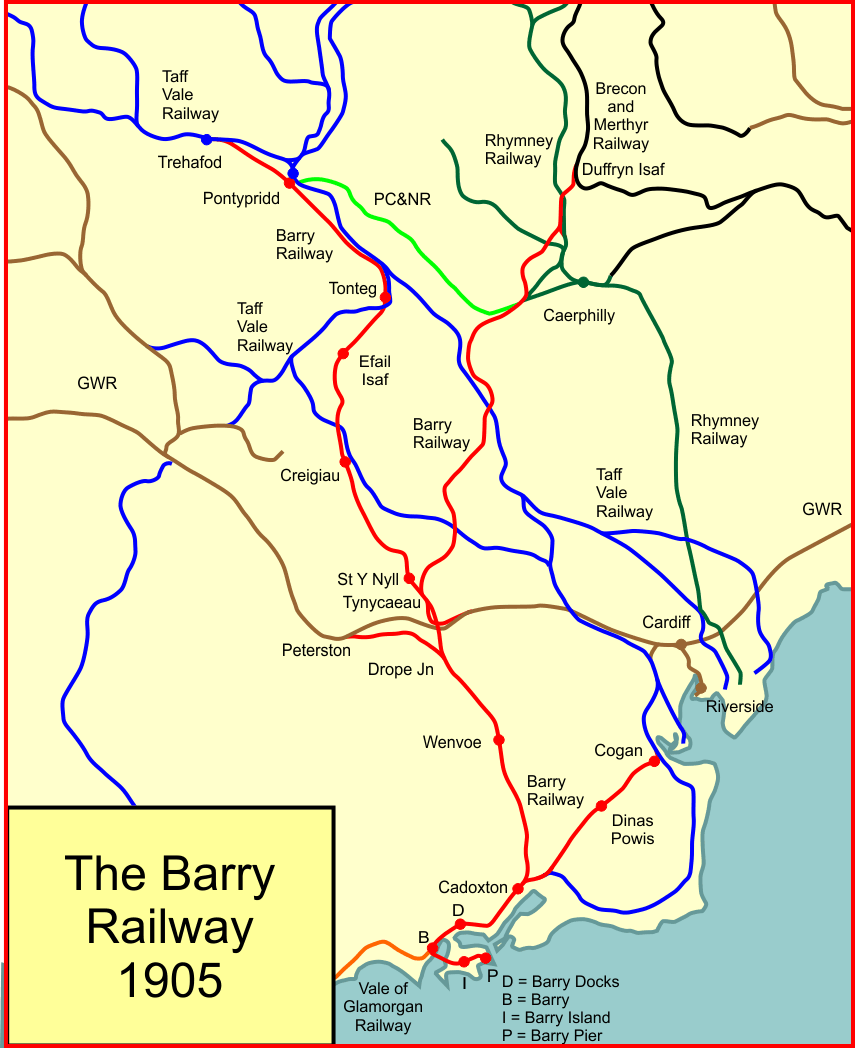
System map of the Barry Railway

Although chiefly a mineral railway, it ran a suburban passenger service from Barry to Cardiff. After 1918 the South Wales coal industry declined and the Barry Railway suffered accordingly. After the grouping of the railways in 1922 the Great Western Railway sought rationalisation, and the main line of the Barry Railway, which duplicated the ex-Taff Vale main line between Treforest and Trehafod, was 'run down', the passenger service via Tonteg Junction to Trehafod and Porth being terminated between Tonteg Junction and Hafod Junction in 1930 but freight traffic continued until June 1951, the line from Tonteg Junction via the Graig tunnel and station having been singled in its twilight years. Thus from June 1951, all traffic from the south ran to Pontypridd and beyond via the Tonteg Junction-Treforest Junction section from Barry or Llantrisant. Track was thus lifted later between Tonteg Junction and Trehafod (Hafod Junction). The line from Barry to Cogan, near Penarth, is in use at the present day carrying a busy passenger service to Cardiff and valleys.

== Congestion at Cardiff ==
In the early years of the nineteenth century, it was becoming increasingly pressing to find an efficient and cheap method of bringing coal and iron from the heads of the South Wales Valleys to the ports and wharves of the Bristol Channel. The construction of the Glamorganshire Canal, and further east the Monmouthshire Canal responded to the need, but it was the Taff Vale Railway that brought railway technology (as opposed to plateways) to the fore.

The Taff Vale Railway working with the Cardiff Docks, and later the Rhymney Railway, also to Cardiff Docks, proved immensely successful. However, volumes of traffic, most especially coal for export, increased hugely as more collieries, and more efficient methods of winning coal, were operative. Cardiff Docks were seen as a near-monopoly, and as such were thought to be unresponsive to customers' wishes. Coal ships intending to load at Cardiff were often obliged to stand off for days waiting for a berth, and loaded coal trains heading for the docks frequently were obliged to wait in loops and on goods lines on the approach, waiting for clearance to enter.

In fact extensions to the docks took place, and in 1865 a new harbour at Penarth was opened together with a new access railway from what is now Radyr.

== First attempts ==
Barry Railway Act 1865 (Note: Section 1.)
- Act of Parliament
- Parliament of the United Kingdom
- Long title: An Act to incorporate a Company for making and maintaining a Railway from the Peterston Station of the South Wales Railway to Cadoxton-juxta-Barry, with a Branch to Sully, all in the County of Glamorgan; and for other Purposes.
- Citation: 28 & 29 Vict. c. ccxxxiv
- Territorial extent: United Kingdom

Dates
- Royal assent: 5 July 1865
- Commencement: 5 July 1865 (Note: The Acts of Parliament (Commencement) Act 1793.)
- Repealed: 31 January 2013
Other legislation
Repealed by	Statute Law (Repeals) Act 2013

Status: Repealed

Text of statute as originally enacted

In 1865 a Barry Railway was incorporated by act of Parliament, the Barry Railway Act 1865 (28 & 29 Vict. c. ccxxxiv). It was to make a branch railway from Peterston on the broad-gauge South Wales Railway to Barry, with powers to lay a third rail for mixed-gauge operation on the SWR main line between Llantrisant and Newport. The Barry Harbour Act 1866 (29 & 30 Vict. c. liii) was obtained to make a harbour at Barry. Both of these proposals foundered, chiefly because the Taff Vale Railway practically monopolised the transport of coal from the Taff and Rhondda Valleys to Cardiff, and was hostile to diversion of that traffic from its new harbour at Penarth. In addition, the financial crisis following the failure of the banking firm of Overend, Gurney and Company meant that for a while finance was impossible to get.

== The Barry Dock and Railway ==
Dissatisfaction with the available railway and dock facilities was however unabated, and there was a considerable desire for an alternative to break the monopoly. In 1882 promoters allied to the Taff Vale Railway and the Bute Trustees (who controlled the Cardiff Docks) proposed new docks at Roath, east of the city, and a new approach railway from the Taff Vale line. It was made public that mineral haulage rates would be increased by one penny per ton to pay for this line, both on traffic to Roath and to the existing Bute Docks. This deepened the hostility and further inflamed the feelings of the coal owners.

David Davies had been active as a railway contractor, and in later life a politician and industrialist, and with other like-minded business people, he formed a group intent on building an alternative dock and railway system, and a bill was prepared and submitted for the 1883 session of Parliament. In fact the strength of opposition from the Taff Vale Railway, the Bute Trustees, and other established companies was such that the bill failed in that session.

Barry Dock and Railways Act 1884
- Act of Parliament
- Parliament of the United Kingdom
- Long title: An Act to authorise the Construction of a Dock at Barry Island and Railways and Works in Glamorganshire connected therewith and for other purposes.
- Citation: 47 & 48 Vict. c. cclvii
- Territorial extent: United Kingdom

Dates
- Royal assent: 14 August 1884
- Commencement: 14 August 1884
- Repealed: 31 July 1978
Other legislation
Repealed by	Vale of Glamorgan (Barry Harbour) Act 1978

Status: Repealed

Text of statute as originally enacted

It was resubmitted in the 1884 session, and this time it was passed, and the Barry Dock and Railways Act 1884 (47 & 48 Vict. c. cclvii) gained royal assent on 14 August 1884. The promoters' costs for the two bills had been about £70,000, a huge sum at that time.

Authorised share capital was £1,050,000, (Note: Barrie (1983), p. 159; but on page 162 he says that the cost of construction was estimated to be £2 million.) to build from Barry northward to a junction with the Taff Vale Railway at Trehafod, in the Rhondda; there was to be a south-to-west junction with the GWR main line (former South Wales Railway main line) at Peterston and an east to north connection nearby, and a spur to join the Taff Vale main line at Treforest. The dock was to be 73 acres (30 ha) in extent, the largest enclosed dock area in the country; in fact the area between Barry Island and the mainland was to be made non-tidal, an area extending to 200 acres (81 ha).

== Taff Vale counter-attack ==
The Taff Vale Railway, and to some extent the Rhymney Railway, felt keenly the effect of the Barry developments. They did not control the Cardiff Docks and were largely subject to the wishes of the owner, the Bute Trustees, who could set rates and choose whether to install plant independently of the railway companies. Conversely the integrated nature of the Barry Dock and Railway's plans would give it considerable commercial advantage.

The Taff Vale set about obtaining parliamentary authorisation in 1885 to acquire the Bute Docks, but this was refused by the Lords committee when the Taff Vale would not agree to running powers requested by the Barry Railway northward from the Trehafod and Treforest connections. The Taff Vale also supported a nominally independent Cardiff, Penarth and Barry Junction Railway which would be a spoiler to the Barry company's development plans at Barry itself, but this was refused, the Barry being granted a corresponding railway from Barry to a junction at Cogan with the Taff Vale's Penarth lines, by the Taff Vale Railway Act 1885 (48 & 49 Vict. c. clvii) of 31 July 1885. The Taff Vale was granted a circuitous coastal route from Penarth to Cadoxton.

Although this was a victory for the Barry company, it left open the possibility that the Taff Vale Railway would bring Rhondda coal to Barry via Cardiff and this coastal line, rather than hand it over to the Barry Railway at Trehafod. In 1888 the Barry once again applied to Parliament for running powers north of Trehafod; this was refused but a complex non-discrimination requirement was imposed, giving some protection.

== First openings ==
On 20 December 1888 the line between Barry Dock and Cogan was opened to traffic, although this was only a light local passenger service. On the same day the Taff Vale opened its coastal service of passenger trains (only, at first) from Cardiff to Cadoxton which was extended back to Barry station from 8 February 1889.

The Barry Railway main line required more effort in construction, but on 22 November 1888 an inspection trip had traversed the full length of the main line. From 13 May 1889 the line from Barry to the junctions with the GWR at Peterston were opened to goods and mineral traffic; the Cogan line started to carry such trains on the same day.

The dock too, was beginning to be ready, and water was admitted to it on 29 June 1889, followed by a formal and ceremonial opening on 18 July 1889. On that day the main line railway from Trehafod and Treforest was also opened to mineral trains.

== Commercial success ==
The inauguration was an instant success, and considerable volumes of coal and other merchandise were passed over the railway and through the dock system. Much of this was abstracted from the Taff Vale Railway, which lost volume and income, and the Bute Trustees too suffered. They reduced their rates in an effort to remain competitive, and this started a rate war.

Railway mineral rates were heavily regulated, and the non-discrimination requirements in the Barry's authorising legislation became very important. The Taff Vale nevertheless attempted a series of legal challenges, which mostly failed to gain support.

== Change of company name ==
Barry Dock and Railways Act 1891
- Act of Parliament
- Parliament of the United Kingdom
- Long title: An Act to enable the Barry Dock and Railways Company to construct new Railways and for other purposes.
- Citation: 54 & 55 Vict. c. clxxxiv
- Territorial extent: United Kingdom

Dates
- Royal assent: 5 August 1891
- Commencement: 5 August 1891
- Repealed: 31 July 1978
Other legislation
Repealed by	Vale of Glamorgan (Barry Harbour) Act 1978

Status: Repealed

Text of statute as originally enacted

The company had been incorporated under the name of Barry Dock and Railway Company. It transpired that the precedence of the word "dock" placed the shares in a different category that was disadvantageous, and it was decided to change the company name to The Barry Railway Company. This was approved by section 38 of the Barry Dock and Railways Act 1891 (54 & 55 Vict. c. clxxxiv) of 5 August 1891.

== Extending the network ==
At an early date the Barry directors were considering a further extension to their network, to capture traffic in the Rhymney Valley. A proposal reached the 1888 session of Parliament to build from near St Fagans to Llanishen on the Rhymney Railway, but was turned down in the Lords Committee. A second attempt was made in 1889 for an independent line from near Cogan to Cardiff, and also a junction with the Rhymney Railway north of Caerphilly. This too was withdrawn by the Barry Railway, but significant concessions were obtained.

These were that the Taff Vale Railway would agree running powers (except for passenger trains) between Cogan and Walnut Tree Junction over the Penarth and Radyr lines. At Walnut Tree the Rhymney Railway had a junction with the Taff Vale Railway, in fact giving access to the Rhymney's original main line there. Moreover, running powers would be granted for all classes of train from Cogan to Penarth Curve South Junction, where connection was made with the Great Western Railway main line. From this point the GWR had its Riverside Branch, opened in 1884, running down the east side of the River Taff into an important industrial area; both the Barry and the Taff Vale were given running powers over this line, which was to be made suitable by the GWR for passenger operation.

This was duly done, and the Barry Railway was able to operate a passenger service between Barry and Cardiff Riverside GWR station, close to the GWR main station (now Cardiff Central) from 14 August 1893. The Taff Vale had already conceded through ticketing, as its former practice of insisting on rebooking of passengers at Cogan was demonstrably unreasonable and had attracted public criticism. The Barry therefore had a viable residential passenger operation.

The passenger service was extended down the bank of the River Taff to Cardiff Clarence Road from 2 April 1894, with seventeen trains each way on weekdays.

== Extensions at Barry ==
It was apparent from the outset that Barry Docks would need to be enlarged, and already the Barry Railway Act 1893 (56 & 57 Vict. c. ccvi) for a No. 2 Dock, of 34 acres (14 ha), was obtained. The massive trade at the docks placed on the company the obligations of a dock authority, and since 1889 the company had been responsible for pilotage and the control of alcohol and other public order issues within the docks, as well as the more obvious conservancy issues.

The Barry Railway Act 1893 also paved the way for an extension railway to Barry Island, as Barry was increasingly becoming a seaside leisure destination. At first this was to be a 3 ft 6 in (1,067 mm) gauge tramway on reserved tracks, horse or steam powered, but not electrically powered. The tramway concept was abandoned in the following year, when a conventional railway branch was substituted. At 3/4 mile (1.2 km) long, it was quickly built, and opened on 3 August 1896.

== Extensions at the north end ==
The Barry Company made further attempts to get access to the Rhymney Railway network in the years 1893 – 1895, but these were refused.

In addition, running powers west of Trehafod on the Taff Vale Rhondda lines were sought and refused, but during the 1894 session it was suggested that the Barry Railway be allowed to operate passenger trains over the Taff Vale from Porth to Barry. Seeing this as a small concession to make, the Taff Vale agreed and from 16 March 1896 the Barry Railway operated such a service. Of course its own main line had not previously operated passenger trains, so new stations were required; in most cases these were made with platform loops to avoid conflict with the heavy mineral trains service.

In the 20 miles (32 km) from Cadoxton, the first stations were at Wenvoe, Creigiau, Efail Isaf, Treforest and Pontypridd. The Pontypridd station became known as Pontypridd (Graig) from 1924.

Barry was not a prime travel destination for the residents of the Taff and Rhondda except on holiday days, and the Barry Railway went about providing a train service to Cardiff, over the GWR main line from St.Fagans. Such a service was not covered by the Taff Vale's running power concession, so the trains only ran southwards from the Barry station (Graig) at Pontypridd. It started operating on 7 June 1897.

There was growing congestion between Cogan Junction and Penarth Curve South Junction, which was carrying all the Taff Vale traffic to Penarth Docks as well as The Taff Vale's own passenger traffic and the Barry traffic to Cardiff. The Taff Vale agreed to quadruple the line to ease the matter.

== Vale of Glamorgan ==
Coal owners in the Llynvi, Garw and Ogmore Valleys were agitating for better access to dock facilities in the 1880s. They were using Porthcawl, which had very limited shipping capacity. They promoted a railway from Coity Junction, just north of Bridgend, to Barry along a route near the coast, joining the Barry Railway west of the Barry Dock. The result was the Vale of Glamorgan Railway Act 1889 (52 & 53 Vict. c. clxxxviii) of 26 August 1889. Nominally independent, it was supported in Parliament by the Barry Railway, and when constructed it was equipped and operated by the Barry Railway.

The company was unable to raise the necessary subscriptions, and the Barry Railway was obliged to guarantee a 4% return to VoGR shareholders, authorised by the Barry Railway Act 1893. This effectively put the VoGR under the control of the Barry Railway.

The line opened on 1 December 1897. A viaduct experienced subsidence and the line was closed again between Barry and Rhoose on 10 January 1898. A temporary diversion line was laid round the viaduct and it opened on 25 April 1898 enabling reopening of the through route. The viaduct was secured and the original route reopened on 8 January 1900 for goods, and 9 April 1900 for passenger trains.

== A new line from Swansea to London ==
Dissatisfaction with the Great Western Railway continued to be a factor. The Severn Tunnel had been opened in 1886, but the GWR route to London was still via Bristol and Bath. A South Wales Direct Line had been proposed for some years, but the GWR was reluctant to build it.

Promoters, chiefly coal owners and those associated with the Vale of Glamorgan Railway and the Barry Railway, put together a scheme for a London and South Wales Railway in November 1895. At 163 miles (262 km) in length, it was to run from Cogan via Cardiff and skirting Newport on the north side, crossing the River Severn at Beachley by a new 3,300-yard (3,000 m) bridge, then via Thornbury, Malmesbury and Lechlade, to make a junction with the Metropolitan Railway near Great Missenden. Junctions would be made with every railway intersected, except the Great Western; the scheme was costed at £5,688,252. At the same time, the Vale of Glamorgan Railway promoted a bill for a new line westward from Ewenny via Porthcawl and Port Talbot to join the Rhondda and Swansea Bay Railway at Aberavon.

Barrie says:

"Beyond all reasonable doubt, the real object of the London & South Wales promoters was to force the Great Western Railway to carry out its South Wales Direct Line, and to make certain concessions to the South Wales coal trade. In this they succeeded, and the London & South Wales scheme was withdrawn in 1896."

The Great Western Railway agreed to build its own South Wales Direct Line, from Wootton Bassett to Patchway via Badminton, and it was opened by the GWR in 1903.

== Barry Pier and pleasure steamers ==
In an interview in 1906, the General Manager of the Barry Railway said,

A passenger pontoon was constructed within the breakwaters, at which passenger steamers land or take in passengers. The pontoon is served by railway lines made from Barry through Barry Island, and it is now possible for passengers from Cardiff, and the districts containing the teeming population of South Wales, to travel by train to the pontoon, and embark for the various watering-places and towns in the Bristol Channel.

Barry Railway Act 1896
- Act of Parliament
- Parliament of the United Kingdom
- Long title: An Act to enable the Barry Railway Company to construct new Railways and to exercise certain running powers and for other purposes.
- Citation: 59 & 60 Vict. c. cxciii
- Territorial extent: United Kingdom

Dates
- Royal assent: 7 August 1896
- Commencement: 7 August 1896
- Repealed: 31 July 1978
Other legislation
Repealed by	Vale of Glamorgan (Barry Harbour) Act 1978

Status: Repealed

Text of statute as originally enacted

The Barry Island branch was extended to Barry Pier. The extension was authorised by the Barry Railway Act 1896 (59 & 60 Vict. c. cxciii), and it opened on 27 June 1899. The line descended to Barry Pier through a tunnel at 1 in 80. The Pier station never had an ordinary train service, but was limited to trains connecting with pleasure steamers, generally in the summer. The steamer service was provided by the firm of P & A Campbell from July 1899. They were the principal steamer operator on the Bristol Channel at the time, but the commercial relationship between them and the Barry Railway was strained.

Barry Railway (Steam Vessels) Act 1904
- Act of Parliament
- Parliament of the United Kingdom
- Long title: An Act to authorise the Barry Railway Company to provide and work Steam Vessels to raise Additional Capital and for other purposes.
- Citation: 4 Edw. 7. c. ccxxvii
- Territorial extent: United Kingdom

Dates
- Royal assent: 15 August 1904
- Commencement: 15 August 1904

Status: Current legislation

Text of statute as originally enacted

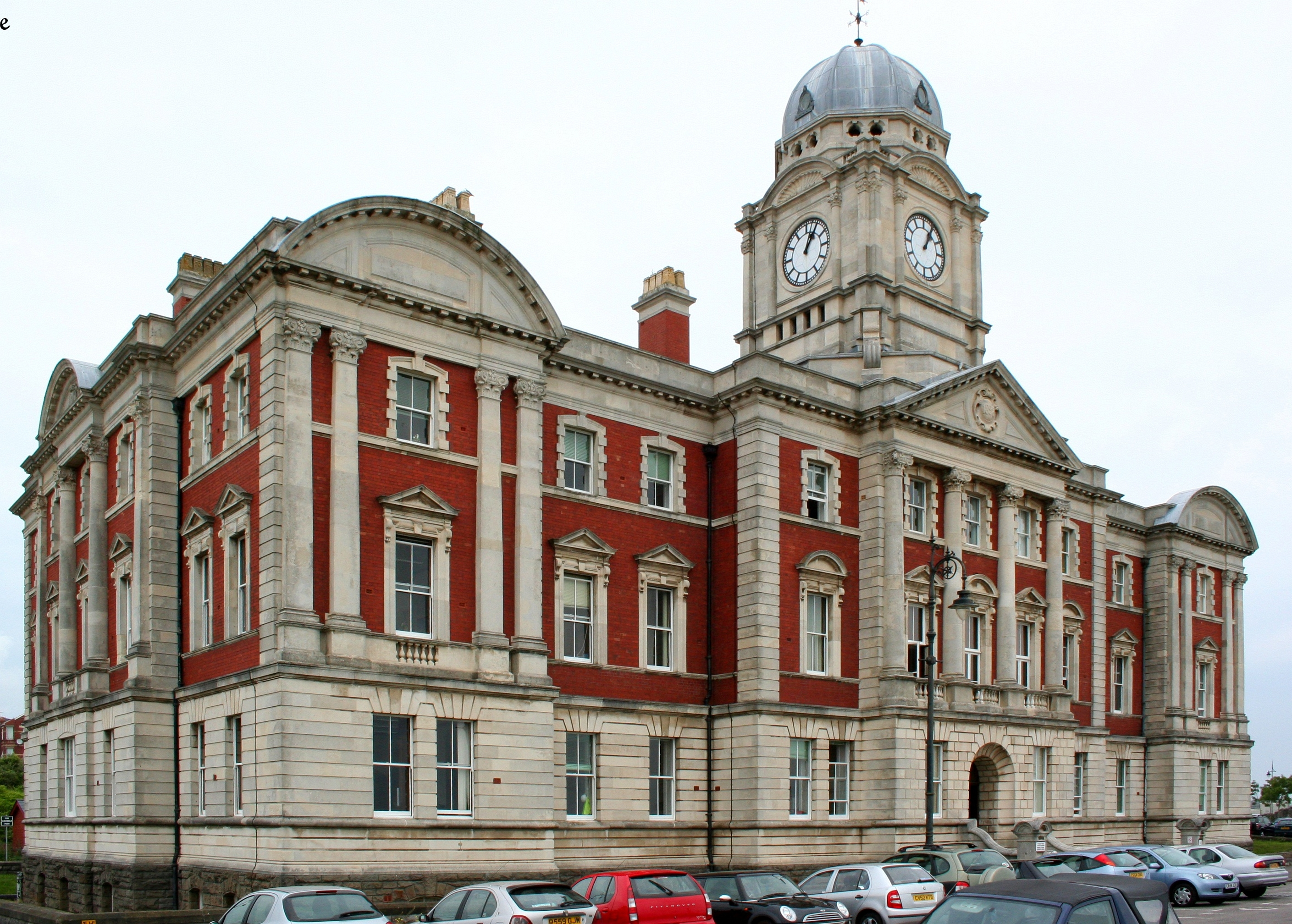
Barry Dock Offices – June 2007

The Barry Railway acquired statutory powers—the Barry Railway (Steam Vessels) Act 1904 (4 Edw. 7. c. ccxxvii) of 15 August 1904—to operate its own steamer fleet, but these powers were considerably restricted, limiting the routes that might be operated. In 1905 the Barry Railway started its own steamer operation with two newly constructed vessels, Gwalia and Devonia and an 1899 steamer Westonia. In 1907 the paddle steamer Barry was added. 191,000 passengers made steamer journeys via Barry in that year.

The operation was carried out for some time by a subsidiary company, the Barry & Bristol Channel Steamship Company trading as The Red Funnel Line. In the following years the Barry Railway made commercial arrangements with the owners of the piers at Burnham-on-Sea, Weston-super-Mare, Minehead and Ilfracombe.

In the summer of 1906 the Barry Railway ran the Ilfracombe Boat Express, which operated from Cardiff Riverside and non-stop from Cardiff General GWR station to Barry.

Notwithstanding the considerable volume of passengers carried, the steamer operation proved of doubtful profitability, and by August 1910 the four vessels had all been disposed of. PS Gwalia was sold to the Furness Railway on 7 May 1910, and five days later the other three steamers were sold to Bristol Channel Passenger Boats Ltd. The Barry Railway had spent £104,470 to acquire the four vessels, and they sold them at a loss of £36,000. Bristol Channel Passenger Boats struggled to make the business pay and after two seasons, sold out to P & A Campbell.

== Dock facilities ==
The Barry Docks were constructed on a lavish scale with the most modern equipment, designed to enable rapid loading and discharge of vessels. Hydraulic power was provided for the operation of cranes and other plant, and the lock gates, and electric lighting was installed, as 24-hour working was in force.

After 1898, the Barry Docks consisted of a 7-acre (2.8 ha) basin and two docks of 73 and 31 acres (30 and 13 ha) respectively. In 1901 the company stated that there were 21 high-level and nine low-level coal hoists with a further eight movable (using traversers) two of which were placed on No. 1 dock. Nos. 1 to 11 on No. 1 dock and 22 to 31 on No. 2 dock, were served by high-level rail tiers and short viaducts and with generally two lines for the laden wagons to a single line weighbridge and two lines from the single line empties weighbridge returns. Low-level hoists on No. 1 dock were numbered 12, then 13 to 18 on the Mole and thence 19 on the Barry Island side of No. 1 dock. Following 1915, the Barry Railway Company established low-level fixed hoists Nos. 32, 33, 34 and Nos. 4 and 5 movable, on the Barry Island side of No. 1 dock. Two earlier low-level hoists, Nos. 20 and 21 were fed from Graving Dock Junction and Caisson sidings area. In 1893 these were numbered 2 and 3 but were removed prior to 1927 and one early map shows No. 18 on the Mole, renumbered 20, 18 being substituted for one on the Barry Island side of No. 1 dock quay where three low-level hoists, Nos. 1, 2 and 3 movable (with traversers) existed either side of No. 19. Most of the 1st-generation high-level coal hoists on both docks were replaced by Armstrong–Whitworth structures capable of more rapid discharge of coal wagons. There had been three high-level movable hoists at the north end of No. 2 dock and close to Nos. 30 and 31 hoists and on one docks plan, these too were referenced "No. 3 Movable" and "No. 4 Movable." Besides other dedicated plots, that area had been used by the US Army towards the end of World War II. None of the hoists remain, and only pictorial records of their format survive.

The Barry Railway General Manager, Edward Lake, told The Railway Magazine:

Other provisions for dealing with merchandise traffic have not been lost sight of. Along the south side of dock No. 2 has been erected a commodious transit shed with cellarage and ground and upper floors, and bonded stores, of 500 ft. long and 156 ft. wide. In connection therewith, cranes and other appliances have been provided to enable traffic to be received into the sheds either from ships or trucks or to be loaded from the warehouse into trucks or vessels with the utmost despatch.

Close to this building a huge flour mill has erected by Messrs. Joseph Rank, Ltd. Every provision has been made thereat fur dealing with an extensive trade in the most complete manner, and no doubt this will add considerably to 'the future prosperity of the Barry Railway. A modern dock like Barry would not be complete without a cold store. and one has been constructed adjacent to the dock quays, in which frozen meat and other goods requiring cold storage are stored, and the arrangements are such that the Traffic may be discharged direct from the ship’s hold into trucks and despatched to the consuming centres or stored in the cold store with the least possible despatch and exposure. At present the store is capable of accommodating 80,000 carcasses of sheep and other goods, and is capable of being largely extended.

== Connecting to the Rhymney Railway ==
The Barry Railway had been able to access the Rhymney Railway since 1891, using the running powers on the Taff Vale Railway from Cogan to Taffs Well. As volumes of traffic increased, crossing the busy Taff Vale main line at Walnut Tree Junction became increasingly difficult and subject to delays. If the Barry Railway could make a more direct connection, it could also connect with the Sirhowy Valley line of the London and North Western Railway, and a huge new route would be opened up, enabling a general merchandise traffic between Cardiff and the West Midlands and North West of England as well as bringing down the mineral resources of the upper valleys.

The Barry Railway deposited proposals for the 1896 parliamentary session to build a new line from Tynycaeau Junction (near St Fagans) to join the Rhymney Railway near Caerphilly (at Penrhos Junction), and to get running powers on that railway's system north from the new junction. The Taff Bargoed line, joint between the Rhymney and the Great Western Railway, led to the important mineral centre of Dowlais, and running powers were sought on that line too.

The Barry Railway Act 1896 was passed on 7 August 1896 for the line, 7 miles (11 km) in length, but the running powers were refused. Descending from Penrhos Junction, the existing Rhymney Railway line to Walnut Tree Junction dropped down into the valley by a long and steep gradient at 1 in 48 but the Barry Railway's new line, parallel in this area, remained at a higher level and crossed the railways, river and canal in the Nantgarw gap by the Walnut Tree viaduct of 517 yards (473 m). The engineering complexity of the route was such that it was not until 1 August 1901 that it opened, for goods and mineral traffic only. It had cost £270,000.

== Cadoxton improvements ==
The mineral operation on the Barry Railway was of course focused on the sidings at Barry and Cadoxton, where considerable sorting activities took place and dock storage was necessary waiting for specific ships to become available for loading. About 100 miles (160 km) of sidings were at the location, and access to the sidings by arriving trains resulted in serious congestion. In 1898-1899 a burrowing junction was constructed at Cadoxton from the sidings and goods lines on the north side of the line to No. 1 dock.

R. A. Cooke's GWR track layout diagrams show the new docks access lines as "ready by 1898". The facility comprised two pairs of tracks descending at 1 in 121 from Cadoxton Low Level Junction to Graving dock Junction, one pair feeding No. 2 dock and the other No. 1 dock and goods yard, all at quay level, although there was a double-line junction to access No. 1 dock from the No. 2 dock lines near Graving Dock Junction. The section between the two block posts (Cadoxton Low level Junction and Graving Dock Junction) had always been controlled permissively (i.e. more than one train could be permitted to enter the section at a time).

The 'burrowing' was provided by two reverse curve alignments with the 'bores' separated by a dividing wall with refuge manways, besides those provided in the main support walls. Although generally referred to as the "Graving Dock Tunnels", technically the facility was in fact a long skew rail underbridge over which some 14 sidings passed between Cadoxton Low Level Junction and Barry Docks signal box. The structure was radically altered to provide the new Barry docks area southerly town bypass road and now named Ffordd y Mileniwm, one half of the 'bore' being backfilled and the other, capped by a skew road overbridge which now provides a direct road link from Cadoxton to Barry Island. Just one freight railtrack survives here and links the Barry-Cardiff main line with No. 2 dock.

== On to the Brecon and Merthyr Railway ==
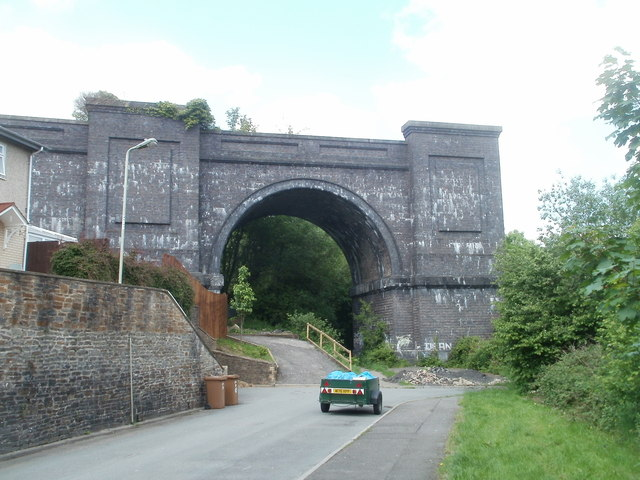
The remaining section of the Llanbradach or Pwll-y-pant viaduct

Frustrated by the refusal of running powers on the Rhymney network, the Barry Railway now decided to extend the new line further north-east to join the Brecon and Merthyr Railway, crossing the Rhymney Valley to do so.

Barry Railway Act 1898
- Act of Parliament
- Parliament of the United Kingdom
- Long title: An Act to enable the Barry Railway Company to construct new railways and works and for other purposes.
- Citation: 61 & 62 Vict. c. cxlii
- Territorial extent: United Kingdom

Dates
- Royal assent: 25 July 1898
- Commencement: 25 July 1898

Status: Current legislation

Text of statute as originally enacted

The Barry Railway Act 1898 (61 & 62 Vict. c. cxlii) permitted the extension to cross the Senghenydd branch of the Rhymney Railway and then cross the Rhymney Valley itself, joining the Brecon and Merthyr line near Duffryn Isaf; the new line was 3 3/4 miles (6.0 km) in length and included even more prodigious engineering challenges, in particular the Llanbradach or Pwll-y-Pant viaduct. This alone cost about half of the £500,000 expense of building the line. The viaduct was 2,400 feet (730 m) long with eleven spans 125 feet (38 m) above the valley floor. The Brecon and Merthyr Railway received financial help to enable it to double-track parts of its system.

The new route opened for goods and mineral traffic only on 2 January 1905. (Passenger excursion trains to Barry did run over the line.)

In fact the Brecon and Merthyr Railway did not extend to Dowlais; by a compromise arrangement when the line from Bargoed to Dowlais was authorised, the line was divided lengthways, and the Rhymney Railway owned the northern 3 miles (4.8 km) to Dowlais; for that reason Barry Railway running powers over the B&MR were not enough to get to Dowlais.

Barry Railway Act 1907
- Act of Parliament
- Parliament of the United Kingdom
- Long title: An Act to enable the Barry Railway Company to construct new railways, and for other purposes.
- Citation: 7 Edw. 7. c. clxxiii
- Territorial extent: United Kingdom

Dates
- Royal assent: 28 August 1907
- Commencement: 28 August 1907

Status: Current legislation

Between 1904 and 1907 the Barry Railway planned an extension railway to by-pass the Rhymney Railway section, and to reach Newport over the B&M Railway, and this was authorised by the Barry Railway Act 1907 (7 Edw. 7. c. clxxiii) of 28 August 1907. However, there were considerable limitations, particularly on rate competition, and the Barry Railway saw that this expensive line would not be profitable, and it delayed construction, hoping to negotiate better terms with its competitors. The delay continued right up until 1914, when the outbreak of World War I prevented the realisation of major new schemes.

== Financial results ==
From the outset the Barry Railway had been remarkably successful in financial terms. Volumes of traffic carried, numbers of ships berthed at Barry, quantity of coal exported, all resulted in superlatives. Shareholders had become accustomed to excellent dividends and these were consistently distributed, although there were periods when the expense of new works, and of the Parliamentary costs associated with them, diverted profit away from shareholders, leading to dissatisfaction.

Nevertheless, the dividend was 10% in 1890, and every year from 1894 to 1897 and in 1912, and was never less than 9.5% in any subsequent year.

== Passenger services ==
Although the mineral traffic was massively dominant, the Barry Railway ran a respectable passenger operation. Between Barry and Cardiff, the company ran 33 trains each way every weekday. Barry to Porth was less intensive, typically six return trips and about the same frequency on the Barry to Bridgend section.

In 1898 there were ten trains daily between Cardiff Riverside and Pontypridd of which four were non-stop. Railcars were briefly used on the service from 1905. The service on the route declined in later years, in favour of the Taff Vale route which gave better connectivity.

Many railway companies adopted railmotors, or "motor cars" as they were described, in the early 1900s. These were single coaches with a small steam engine integrated. They were generally used with very basic stopping places with minimal facilities, and the aim was to enable the cheap establishment of passenger calls at locations where demand was low. The motor car stopping places were very short platforms, and suitable only because a single entrance and exit door in the vehicle could be controlled by the guard.

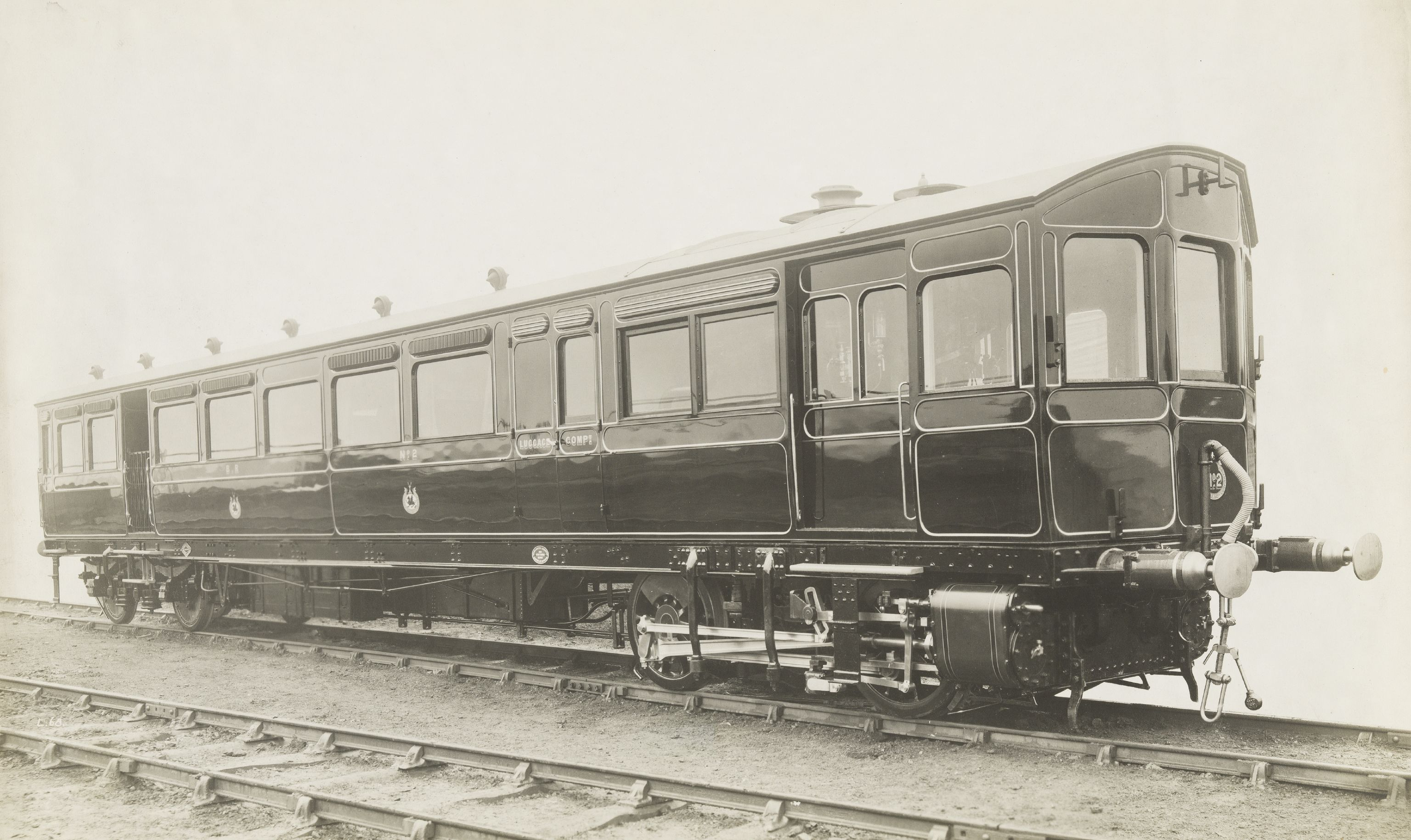
Railmotor No. 2

The Great Western Railway and the Taff Vale Railway made great use of the system, and in 1905 the Barry Railway experimented with it also, opening new stops at St-y-Nyll near the village of St. Brides-super-Ely, a short distance north of Tynycaeau Junctions, and Tonteg, between Efail Isaf and Pontypridd. The Barry Railway purchased two steam rail motors from the North British Locomotive Co; they were very similar to contemporary GWR railmotors. It ran the motor cars between Pontypridd and Cardiff via Tynycaeau Junction and St.Fagans. The service started on 1 May 1905, with the steam railmotors intermingled with conventional trains. It appears that the Tonteg platform was indeed very short, so that conventional trains were not allowed to stop, but St-y-Nyll seems to have been long enough for ordinary trains to use it.

The railmotors had great difficulty in surmounting the climb from St.Fagans to Tynycaeau Junction. Moreover, there were complaints about timekeeping, longer journey times and inadequate accommodation. Richard Evans, the general manager, reported four weeks later on the inadequacies of the motor cars and stated that he was discontinuing the service on the line from 1 June 1905, reinstating the former timetable. Tonteg Platform was closed from that date, but ordinary trains called at St-y-Nyll as a request stop. Passengers for St-y-Nyll were to travel in the carriage next to the rear guard's van.

The two steam railmotors were redeployed on the Vale of Glamorgan line and also as reliefs between conventional trains on the line to Barry Island. Stabled at a special shed at Barry motive power depôt out of use most of the time, they were later de-engined and converted to gangwayed coaches with corridor connection and locally referred to as the 'vestibule train'. (Other records show that they were withdrawn in 1913). However St-y-Nyll Platform was closed from 20 November 1905.

== Working to Rogerstone ==
During World War I the exceptional coal traffic placed heavy demands on all the railways of South Wales. To assist with a difficult motive power situation, Barry Railway locomotives started working through to Rogerstone Yard, on the Newport Western Valley line, via Ebbw Junction; the practice was continued until the Grouping.

== From 1922 ==
World War I considerably altered the Barry Railway's commercial position. As well as the human and material demands of the war, the world trade in coal had changed as oil firing of ships became commonplace. Moreover, it was obvious that the government intended a restructuring of the railways.

This emerged in the Railways Act 1921, which was to establish four new large railway companies, the "groups", and most of the railways of Great Britain would be compulsorily restructured into them, in a process known as the "grouping". There would be a new Great Western Railway; the old GWR was naturally the largest constituent of it, but the Barry Railway too was a constituent company, the fifth largest in capitalisation, larger only than the Rhymney Railway. The change was effective from 1 January 1922; £100 of Barry Railway ordinary stock was converted into £220 of Great Western Railway 5% stock.

The Barry Railway's resources were summarised at the time. Capital issued was £4.82 million, (Note: Semmens, page 32; Barrie had £6,419,000; this may be actual capital expenditure as opposed to share capital issued.) Net income in 1921 was £359,137 on gross income of £1,733,000. The dividend on ordinary stock in 1921 was 10%.

The aggregate route length was 47 1/4 miles (76.0 km). The company had 148 locomotives, 178 passenger carriages and 2,136 freight wagons; there were 2,136 employees.

The Great Western Railway had owned small dock systems but now found itself the owner of one of the two largest dock groups in the country. At first the GWR was uncertain of the possibility of a positive future for this sector, but using the skill and experience of the existing managers of the dock systems it achieved commercial success.

The new Great Western Railway was able to make some simplifying changes. Most of the pits and other terminal locations were on the older railways, with the Barry Railway providing an alternative route. The GWR started to arrange for locomotives to work through from the pits to Barry without engine change at Trehafod; this was particularly efficient with the new GWR 2-8-0T classes, and Trehafod engine shed was closed in 1926.

Powers were taken by the Great Western Railway Act 1926 (16 & 17 Geo. 5. c. lxxxviii) of 4 August 1926 to abandon the connecting line between Penrhos Junction and Duffryn Isaf (Barry Junction) on the B&M route, as traffic could be handled on the Rhymney line.

In 1929 a major remodelling was undertaken at Barry Island, with the addition of two platforms to accommodate summer excursion traffic and part-singling of the double-track Barry Island tunnel to Barry Pier. This was commissioned on 5 May 1929.

In 1929 the government passed the Development (Loan Guarantees and Grants) Act 1929 (20 & 21 Geo. 5. c. 7), which enabled cash grants to be paid to the railway companies to fund improvements beneficial to the public and which might relieve unemployment.

The GWR used the arrangement to improve the facilities at Barry Dock. It was encouraging the adoption of 20-ton mineral wagons at the time and the opportunity was taken to adapt the equipment at Barry accordingly. Sixteen new coaling hoists were constructed at Barry. These were massive structures: about 850 long tons (860 tonnes) of concrete were employed at each hoist foundation. Track and structure improvements were necessary and wagon turntables had to be enlarged for the new wagons.

Near Treforest, the Barry line and the former Llantrisant and Taff Vale Junction line ran close beside one another as they both diverged from the Taff Vale main line southwards. In 1930 a major redesign of the layout took place; the Barry route through Pontypridd to Trehafod was downgraded, and a new junction was created at Treforest, climbing to Tonteg where the Llantrisant and the Barry routes diverged. This was implemented on 10 July 1930, when the Barry passenger station (Graig) at Pontypridd was closed.

The up line from Tonteg to Pwllgwaun, about two thirds of the way to Trehafod, and which included the 1,323-yard (1.210 km) Graig tunnel, was closed as a running line and used as a wagon storage siding from 1943. In the period 11 October 1943 to 7 September 1944 a total of 119 American locomotives were stored on this section in connection with the preparations for the Normandy landings and their aftermath. The line was closed entirely as a through route in June 1951.

== Demolition of Pen-yr-Heol and Pwll-y-Pant viaducts ==
In 1937 the Pen-yr-Heol viaduct of the Barry Railway was demolished; it had crossed the Sengenydd branch of the original Rhymney Railway. The main girders were 101 feet (31 m) long, 11 ft 2 in (3.40 m) deep, and weighed some 35 tons each. The demolition process was to tip them off the tops of the piers, to fall into the valley fifty feet below. They were cut up there and the scrap was transported away.

Next the larger Pwll-y-Pant viaduct, built in 1904, was demolished in 1937. It consisted of 11 piers, sixteen spans, eleven of 162 feet (49 m) and five approach arches. The main girders weighed about 90 tons each, and the total weight of steel in the structure was about 3,150 tons. The method of demolition adopted was to burn off first as much of the steel decking as possible, allowing the material to fall to the ground below; the girders were then tilted outwards by jacks on top of the brick piers until they overbalanced and fell to the ground. They were then cut up where they lay. Demolition of the 11 piers was accomplished in 1938, explosives being used to fell them and they lay in unsightly heaps until well after the 1950s.

== Under British Railways ==
From nationalisation in 1948, the Barry Railway network was under state ownership, in British Railways. In 1962 the British Transport Docks Board was established and took over all the major docks installations within the British Transport Commission.

Local passenger services between Barry and Pontypridd and between Cardiff and Pontypridd via St.Fagans were withdrawn on 10 September 1962.

The link at Drope Junction to Peterston was closed on 1 March 1963, and the Tynycaeau link to St.Fagans closed on 30 March 1963, followed on 17 June 1963 by closure of the main line between Cadoxton and Tonteg Junction.

The Vale of Glamorgan line was closed to local passenger trains on 15 June 1964, and the Bridgend avoiding line between Cowbridge Road Junction and Coity Junction was closed on the same day. However, due consideration to reopening the line to passengers was given and after a 41-year gap, it was reopened as from 10 June 2005 with new station platforms constructed for Llantwit Major and Rhoose, Rhoose being also labelled 'Rhoose Cardiff International Airport'. With the new 2016 Transport for Wales (TfW) body being established, new stations may be reintroduced for other Vale of Glamorgan villages in conjunction with the proposed Metro system.

There was a "dolomite siding" at Walnut Tree and access to it was retained from Penrhos Junction over the viaduct until 14 December 1967. The Barry Island to Barry Pier section was probably not used after October 1971 but it was officially closed on 5 July 1976.

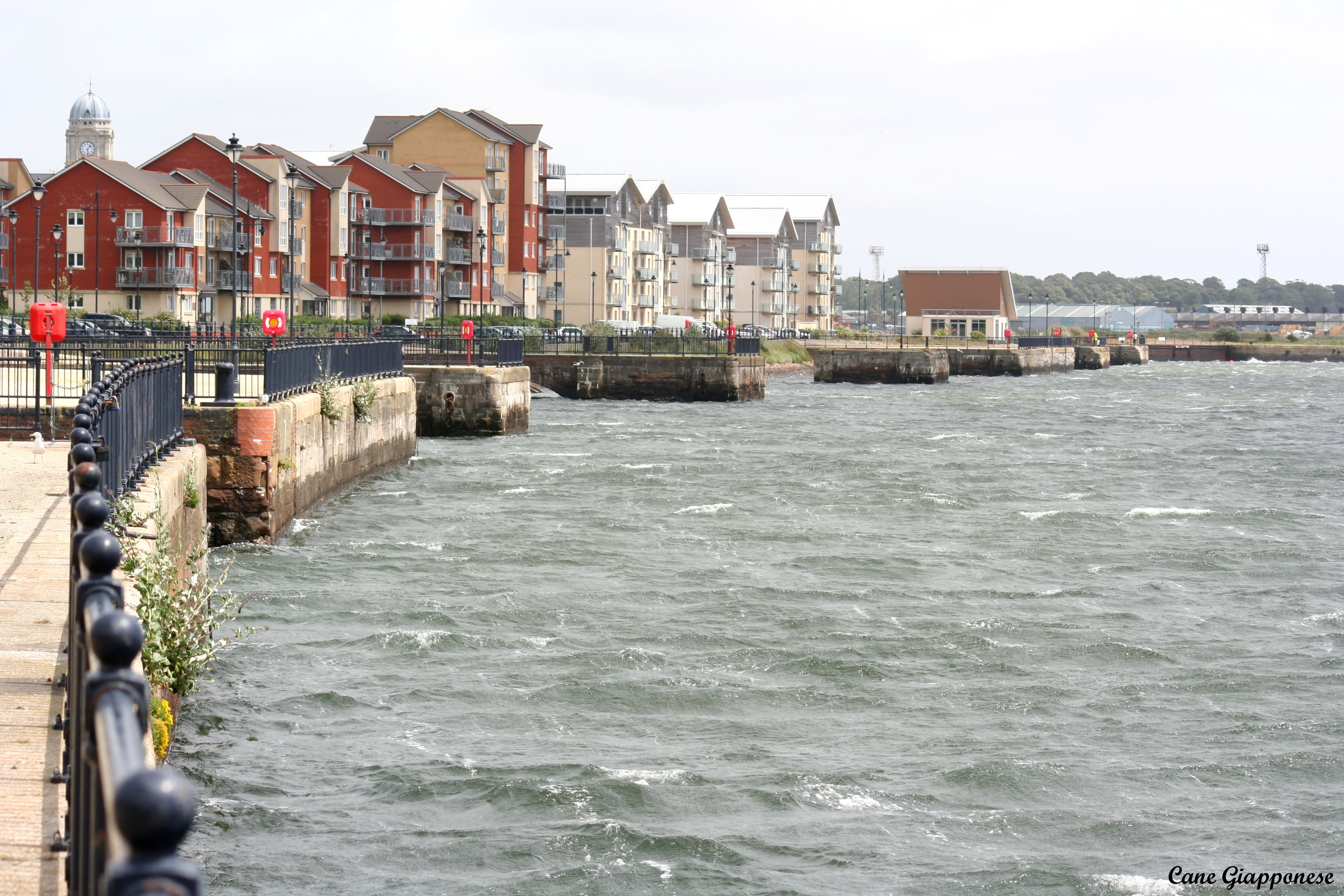
Barry Waterfront, Vale of Glamorgan- July 2007

== The present day ==
The Barry Dock continues, as of 2017, in use under Associated British Ports.

The fine office building which was the Barry Docks & Railway Co. headquarters is still extant. It is an impressive building in brick with Portland stone dressings, a massive pediment, a domed clock tower and classical decoration. It is the only surviving example of Barry Railway infrastructure and is listed Grade II*.

Following the disastrous signal box fire at Tynycaeau Junction on 30 March 1963, the Treforest Junction–Tynycaeau–Cadoxton South Junction and Penrhos Junction–Tynycaeau Junction–Cadoxton South Junction traffic ceased and the lines were lifted by 1965 but part of the Penrhos Junction-Walnut Tree West section of the Penrhos Branch survived until 1968. Those parts of the former Barry Railway network in use as at 2021, comprise the line between Cogan and Barry Island, which has a busy suburban passenger service and some freight traffic, and the Vale of Glamorgan Branch (Barry–Bridgend) for freight and passengers. The line forms an essential link when diversions between Cardiff and Bridgend main line via St.Fagans are in force.

== Topography ==
=== Main line ===
- Hafod Junction; with Taff Vale Railway; opened July 1889; closed June 1951
- Pontypridd; opened 16 March 1896; renamed Pontypridd Graig 1924; closed 7 July 1930;
- Pwllgwaun Tunnel; 1,323 yards or 1,373 yards;
- Treforest; opened 1 April 1898; renamed Treforest High Level 1 July 1924; closed 5 May 1930;
- Tonteg Halt; opened July 1905; closed November 1905;
- Efail Isaf; opened 16 March 1896; closed 10 September 1962;
- Creigiau; opened 16 March 1896; closed 10 September 1962;
- St-y-Nyll Platform; opened July 1905; closed November 1905;
- Tynycaeau Junctions;
- Drope Junction;
- Wenvoe Tunnel; 1,867 yards;
- Wenvoe; opened 16 March 1896; closed 10 September 1962;
- Cadoxton; opened 20 December 1888; still open;
- Barry Dock[s]; opened 20 December 1888; still open;
- Barry; opened 8 February 1889; still open;
- Barry Island; opened 3 August 1896; still open;
- Barry Pier Tunnel; 280 yards
- Barry Pier; opened 27 June 1899; last train 11 October 1971 connecting with MV Balmoral. Station used only occasionally afterwards for enthusiasts special DMU trains. Station officially closed in 1976. Track lifted in that year.

=== Cardiff branch ===
- Cogan Junction;
- Cogan; opened 20 December 1888; still open;
- Cogan Tunnel; 220 yards
- Eastbrook; opened 24 November 1986; still open;
- Dinas Powis; opened 20 December 1888; relocated 30 September 1985; still open;
- Biglis Junction;
- Cadoxton; above.

=== Brecon and Merthyr Railway connection ===
- Duffryn Isaf; formerly Barry Junction;
- Pwll-y-Pant Viaduct; 397 yards (363 m); (informally known as Llanbradach Viaduct)
- Energlyn North Junction;
- Pen-yr-Heol Viaduct; 385 yards (352 m);
- Penrhos Lower Junction;
- Walnut Tree Viaduct; 517 yards (473 m);
- Tynycaeau Junctions; above.

=== Vale of Glamorgan Railway ===
- Barry Junction;
- Barry Sidings;
- Porthkerry Tunnel No. 1; 543 yards
- Porthkerry Viaduct; 375 yards
- Porthkerry Tunnel No. 2; 73 yards
- Rhoose; opened 1 December 1897; closed 15 June 1964; reopened as Rhoose Cardiff International Airport on 12 June 2005 on the same site; still open;
- Aberthaw; opened 1 December 1897; renamed Aberthaw High Level 1 July 1924; closed 15 June 1964;
- Gileston; opened 1 December 1897; closed 15 June 1964;
- Llantwit Major; opened 1 December 1897; closed 15 June 1964; reopened 12 June 2005 on same site; still open;
- Llandow Halt; opened 1 May 1915; closed 15 June 1964;
- Southerndown Road; opened 1 December 1897; closed 23 October 1961;

=== Tunnels ===
The 1,867-yard (1.061 mi; 1.707 km) Wenvoe tunnel is one of the longest railway tunnels in South Wales. Traffic ceased through the tunnel on 31 March 1963 due to a fire at Tynycaeau Junction signal box.

== Locomotives ==
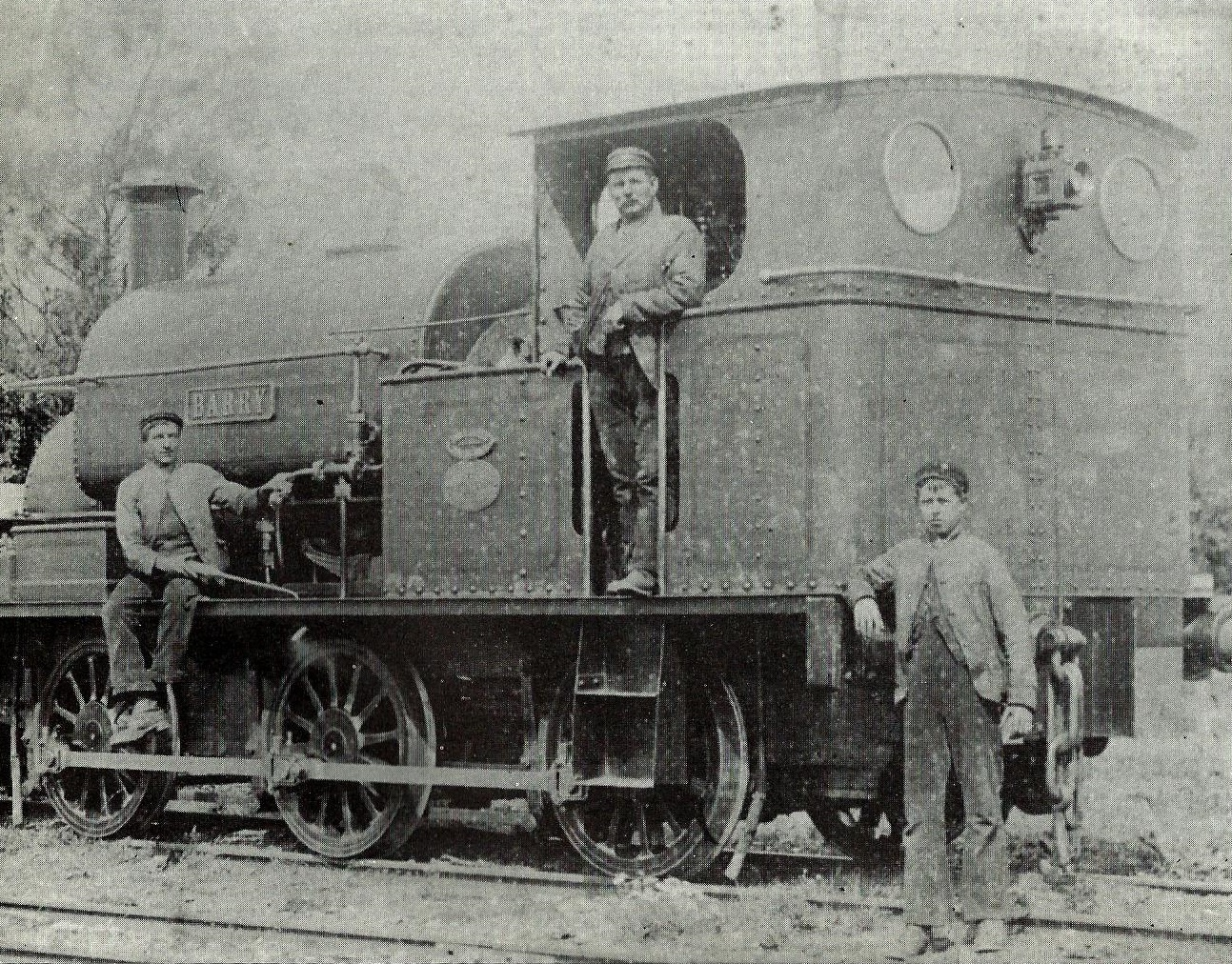
Saddle tank 0-6-0 locomotive Barry (1898)

Being quite a small concern, the Barry Railway used private locomotive works to supply its motive power, particularly Sharp, Stewart and Company and in common with many similar railways in South Wales, preferred locos with six- or eight-coupled (i.e. driving) wheels.

Its complement of locomotives totalled 148 by 1914; on the Grouping, all were renumbered in to the Great Western Railway number series. Not a single Barry locomotive was scrapped during the company's lifetime. In September 1947, under nationalisation, only 84 engines were noted as located at Barry, just a few of the original Barry Railway GW rebuilds still being operational. Barry motive power depot was coded 88C under British Railways.

Only four locomotives were fitted with steam heating apparatus for passenger coaches; these were in connection with the Ports-to-ports service run in conjunction with the GWR, Great Central and North Eastern Railway to Newcastle upon Tyne.

== Rolling stock ==
Coaching stock was painted in an overall Dark Lake (a dark red colour) with 'straw' lining. The carriage lettering was in gold shaded to the right and below in red, and to the lower left in dark grey, to imitate the reflection of the paint work on an embossed letter.

Wagons were painted in red oxide, generally identified by 24-inch (610 mm) high letters BR in white. Wagon numbers were shown on the lower left of the vehicles, while load and tare details were on the lower right.

== Storage of British Railways steam locomotives ==
The modernisation scheme adopted by British Railways in the 1960s resulted in the withdrawal of a considerable number of steam locomotives in a short space of time. Many of these were acquired by Woodham Brothers, who laid them aside in the dock sidings at Barry. Due to scrap metal price fluctuations they did not immediately dismantle them, and in fact they remained there for many years. The location became famous as a last repository of the engines. In some cases the locomotives were later acquired by preservation societies and restored to operation.

== Associated British Ports ==
When the main line railways of Great Britain were nationalised in 1948, in most cases the railway-owned docks transferred into British Railways too.

In 1962, the British Transport Docks Board was formed as a government-owned body to manage various ports formerly owned by the rail industry, including Barry. The Transport Act 1981 was passed with the intention of transferring ownership to the private sector, and in 1983 the organisation became a public limited company known as Associated British Ports. ABP still owns and operates the docks infrastructure today (2017).

== Steamers owned by the Barry Railway ==
Ship	Launched	Tonnage (GRT)	Notes
Barry	1907	497	To Bristol Channel Passenger Boats Ltd in 1910, then P & A Campbell in 1911. Requisitioned during the First World War. Returned to P & A Campbell in 1920. Renamed Waverley in 1936. Requisitioned by the Royal Navy in the Second World War as HMS Snaefell. Bombed on 5 July 1941 off Sunderland.
Devonia	1905	520	To Bristol Channel Passenger Boats Ltd in 1910, then P & A Campbell in 1911. Requisitioned during the First World War and used as a minesweeper. Returned to Campbell's in 1923. Laid up in 1939 then converted to a minesweeper. Abandoned on 31 May 1940 at Dunkirk, France.
Gwalia	1905	562	Sold in 1910 to the Furness Railway for £22,750 and renamed Lady Moyra. Requisitioned during the First World War and subsequently returned to the FR. Sold in 1933 to P & A Campbell and renamed Brighton Queen. Bombed on 1 June 1940 and sunk at Dunkirk.
Westonia	1889	393	Built for Galloway Saloon Steam Packet Co as Tantallon Castle. Renamed Sussex Belle in 1901. To Sussex Steam Packet Co in 1902, then Colwyn Bay & Liverpool Steamship Co later that year, renamed Rhos Colwyn. Bought by BR in 1905 and renamed Westonia. To Bristol Channel Passenger Boats Ltd in 1910, then P & A Campbell in 1911. Rebuilt and renamed Tintern. Sold in 1912 to Portugal, renamed Alentejo. Scrapped in 1924.

== Surviving rolling stock ==
A selection of original Barry Railway coaches survive today. Coach No. 15 (later numbered 163) was under restoration at the Severn Valley Railway for over 30 years before moving to the Gwili Railway in 2024. No. 45 is in storage with the National Museum of Wales. No. 71 resides in Blakemere. No. 97, No. 211 and an unidentified full third coach, all survive as private residences. Another unidentified full third coach, originally thought belonging to the Taff Vale Railway also exists in a private location.

Only two Barry Railway wagons, two iron mink goods vans, are known to still exist today. No. 1151 resides at the Kent and East Sussex Railway. No. 1388 is at the Gloucestershire Warwickshire Railway.
