= List of electoral wards in Rhondda Cynon Taf =

This list of electoral wards in Rhondda Cynon Taf includes council wards, which elect councillors to Rhondda Cynon Taf County Borough Council and community wards, which elect councillors to community councils.

== Current wards ==
=== County borough wards ===
Since the 2022 local elections the county borough has been divided into 46 electoral divisions, electing 75 councillors. A small number of communities elect community (or town) councils (indicated below with a *). The following table lists council divisions, communities, and associated geographical areas:

Electoral wards	Councillors	Communities (civil parishes)	Other geographical areas
Aberaman	3	Aberaman North; Aberaman South	Abercwmboi, Cwmaman, Glynhafod, Godreaman
Abercynon ^{c}	2	Abercynon	Carnetown, Pontcynon, Tyntetown, Ynysboeth
Aberdare East ^{c}	2	Aberdare East	Abernant, Foundry Town, Tŷ Fry
Aberdare West and Llwydcoed	3	Aberdare West; Llwydcoed	Bwllfa Dare, Cwmdare, Robertstown, Trecynon,
Beddau and Tyn-y-nant	2	Llantrisant * (Beddau and Tyn-y-nant wards)	Beddau, Brynteg
Brynna and Llanharan	3	Llanharan *	Bryncae, Brynna, Dolau, Llanharan
Church Village	2	Llantwit Fardre * (Church Village ward)	Upper Church Village
Cilfynydd	1	Pontypridd Town * (Cilfynydd ward)	
Cwm Clydach ^{c}	1	Cwm Clydach	Clydach Vale
Cwmbach ^{c}	2	Cwmbach	
Cymer	2	Cymmer; Trehafod	Cymmer, Glynfach, Trebanog, Trehafod
Ferndale and Maerdy	2	Ferndale; Maerdy	Blaenllechau
Gilfach Goch ^{c}	1	Gilfach Goch *	Garden City, Hendreforgan Estate
Glyn-coch	1	Pontypridd Town * (Glyncoch ward)	
Graig and Pontypridd West	2	Pontypridd Town * (Graig and Rhondda wards)	Maesycoed, Pantygraigwen, Pen-y-coedcae, Hopkinstown, Pwllgwaun
Hawthorn and Lower Rhydfelen	1	Pontypridd Town * (Hawthorn and Rhydfelen Lower wards)	Upper Boat
Hirwaun, Penderyn and Rhigos	2	Hirwaun * Rhigos *	Cwm Hwnt, Cefn Rhigos, Hirwaun, Penderyn
Llanharry	1	Llanharry * (Llanharry ward)	
Llantrisant and Talbot Green	2	Llantrisant * (Llantrisant Town and Talbot Green wards)	Cross Inn, Llantrisant, Rhiwsaeson, Talbot Green, Ynysmaerdy
Llantwit Fardre	2	Llantwit Fardre * (Efail Isaf and Llantwit Fardre wards)	Efail Isaf
Llwyn-y-pia ^{c}	1	Llwynypia	
Mountain Ash	2	Mountain Ash East; Mountain Ash West	Cefnpennar, Cwmpennar, Fernhill, Glenboi, Newtown
Penrhiw-ceibr ^{c}	2	Penrhiwceiber	Miskin, Perthcelyn
Pentre ^{c}	2	Pentre	Ton Pentre
Pen-y-graig ^{c}	2	Pen-y-graig	Dinas, Edmondstown, Penpisgah, Williamstown
Pen-y-waun ^{c}	1	Pen-y-waun	Trenant
Pontyclun Central	1	Pontyclun * (Central ward)	Miskin, Rhondda Cynon Taff, Pontyclun
Pontyclun East	1	Pontyclun * (East ward)	Groes-faen, Mwyndy
Pontyclun West	1	Pont-y-clun * (West ward); Llanharry * (Tylagarw ward)	Brynsadler, Pontyclun, Tyla Garw
Pontypridd Town	1	Pontypridd Town * (Town ward)	Penygraigwen
Porth	2	Porth	Birchgrove, Llwyncelyn, Mount Pleasant
Rhydfelen Central	1	Pontypridd Town * (Rhydfelen Central ward)	Rhydyfelin
Taffs Well ^{c}	1	Taffs Well *	Glan-y-llyn, Nantgarw, Taff's Well, Tŷ Rhiw
Ton-teg	1	Llantwit Fardre * (Tonteg ward)	
Tonypandy ^{c}	1	Tonypandy	
Tonyrefail East	2	Tonyrefail * (Coedely, Collena and Tylcha wards)	Coedely
Tonyrefail West	2	Tonyrefail * (Penrhiw-fer, Thomastown and Tynybryn wards)	
Trallwn	1	Pontypridd Town * (Trallwng ward)	
Trealaw ^{c}	1	Trealaw	
Treforest	1	Pontypridd Town * (Treforest ward)	Glyntaff
Treherbert ^{c}	2	Treherbert	Blaencwm, Blaenrhondda, Tynewydd,
Treorchy ^{c}	2	Treorchy	Cwmparc, Ynyswen
Tylorstown and Ynyshir	2	Tylorstown; Ynyshir	Penrhys, Pontygwaith, Stanleytown, Wattstown
Upper Rhydfelen and Glyn-Taf	1	Pontypridd Town * (Upper Rhydfelen and Glyn-taf ward)	Rhydyfelin
Ynysybwl	2	Ynysybwl and Coed-y-Cwm *	Roberttown, Buarth-y-capel
Ystrad ^{c}	2	Ystrad	Gelli

=== Community wards ===
Communities	Community council	Community wards	Community councillors	Other geographical areas
Hirwaun	Hirwaun & Penderyn; Community Council	Hirwaun	10	
Hirwaun	Hirwaun & Penderyn; Community Council	Penderyn	4	
Gilfach Goch	Gilfach Goch Community; Council	Garden Village	3	
Gilfach Goch	Gilfach Goch Community; Council	Gilfach Goch	2	
Gilfach Goch	Gilfach Goch Community; Council	Hendreforgan	2	
Llanharan	Llanharan Community; Council	Brynna		
Llanharan	Llanharan Community; Council	Llanharan		
Llanharan	Llanharan Community; Council	Llanillid		
Llanharry	Llanharry Community; Council	Llanharry	8	
Llanharry	Llanharry Community; Council	Tylagarw	1	
Llantrisant	Llantrisant Community; Council	Beddau	4	
Llantrisant	Llantrisant Community; Council	Llantrisant Town	3	
Llantrisant	Llantrisant Community; Council	Talbot Green	2	
Llantrisant	Llantrisant Community; Council	Tynant	3	
Llantwit Fardre	Llantwit Fardre; Community Council	Church Village	5	
Llantwit Fardre	Llantwit Fardre; Community Council	Efail Isaf	1	
Llantwit Fardre	Llantwit Fardre; Community Council	Llantwit Fardre	4	
Llantwit Fardre	Llantwit Fardre; Community Council	Tonteg	3	
Pontyclun	Pontyclun Community; Council	Pontyclun Central		
Pontyclun	Pontyclun Community; Council	Pontyclun East		Groes-faen, Mwyndy
Pontyclun	Pontyclun Community; Council	Pontyclun West		Brynsadler
Pontypridd	Pontypridd Town Council	Cilfynydd	2	
Pontypridd	Pontypridd Town Council	Glyncoch	2	
Pontypridd	Pontypridd Town Council	Graig	2	
Pontypridd	Pontypridd Town Council	Hawthorn / Lower Rhydyfelin	2	
Pontypridd	Pontypridd Town Council	Rhondda	3	
Pontypridd	Pontypridd Town Council	Rhydyfelin Central	2	
Pontypridd	Pontypridd Town Council	Upper Rhydyfelin and Glyntaf	2	
Pontypridd	Pontypridd Town Council	Treforest	3	
Pontypridd	Pontypridd Town Council	Town	2	
Pontypridd	Pontypridd Town Council	Trallwn	3	
Tonyrefail	Tonyrefail & District; Community Council	Coedely	1	
Tonyrefail	Tonyrefail & District; Community Council	Collenna	3	
Tonyrefail	Tonyrefail & District; Community Council	Penrhiwfer	2	
Tonyrefail	Tonyrefail & District; Community Council	Thomastown	1	
Tonyrefail	Tonyrefail & District; Community Council	Tylcha	3	
Tonyrefail	Tonyrefail & District; Community Council	Tyn-y-bryn	2	
Ynysybwl and Coed-y-Cwm	Ynysybwl & Coed-y-Cwm; Community Council	Lower	5	
Ynysybwl and Coed-y-Cwm	Ynysybwl & Coed-y-Cwm; Community Council	Upper	7	

== 2022 county borough ward changes ==
A review of electoral arrangements by the Local Democracy and Boundary Commission for Wales resulted in a reduction in the number of county borough wards from 52 to 46, though retaining the same number of councillors. Twenty wards remained the same: Abercynon, Aberdare East, Aberdare West/Llwydcoed, Cilfynydd, Cwm Clydach, Gilfach Goch, Glyncoch, Llantwit Fardre, Penrhiwceiber, Pentre, Pen-y-Graig, Pen-y-Waun, Pontypridd Town, Porth, Taffs Well, Treforest, Tonypandy, Tonyrefail East, Trallwng, Treherbert. The proposals would take effect from the 2022 council elections.

== Pre-2022 county borough wards ==
Pre-2022 electoral wards in Rhondda Cynon Taf

Until May 2022 the Rhondda Cynon Taf county borough was divided into 52 electoral wards returning 75 councillors. Some of these electoral wards were coterminous with communities (parishes) of the same name. The following table lists council electoral wards, communities and associated geographical areas:

Electoral wards	Councillors	Communities (Parishes)	Other geographic areas
Aberaman North ^{c}	2	Aberaman North	
Aberaman South ^{c}	2	Aberaman South	Abercwmboi, Cwmaman, Glynhafod, Godreaman,
Abercynon ^{c}	2	Abercynon	Carnetown, Pontcynon, Tyntetown, Ynysboeth
Aberdare East ^{c}	2	Aberdare East	Abernant, Foundry Town, Tŷ Fry
Aberdare West/Llwydcoed	3	Aberdare West; Llwydcoed	Bwllfa Dare, Cwmdare, Robertstown, Trecynon,
Beddau	1	Llantrisant * (Beddau ward)	Brynteg
Brynna	1	Llanharan * (Brynna and Llanilid wards)	Bryncae
Church Village	1	Llantwit Fardre * (Church Village ward)	Upper Church Village
Cilfynydd	1	Pontypridd Town * (Cilfynydd ward)	
Cwm Clydach ^{c}	1	Cwm Clydach	Clydach Vale
Cwmbach ^{c}	1	Cwmbach	
Cymmer	2	Cymmer; Trehafod	Glynfach, Trebanog, Trehafod
Ferndale	2	Ferndale	Blaenllechau
Gilfach Goch ^{c}	1	Gilfach Goch *	Garden City, Hendreforgan Estate
Glyncoch	1	Pontypridd Town * (Glyncoch ward)	
Graig	1	Pontypridd Town * (Graig ward)	Pen-y-coedcae
Hawthorn	1	Pontypridd Town * (Hawthorn and Rhydfelen Lower wards)	Upper Boat
Hirwaun	1	Hirwaun (part) * (Hirwaun ward)	
Llanharan	1	Llanharan * (Llanharan ward)	Dolau
Llanharry ^{c}	1	Llanharry *	
Llantrisant Town	1	Llantrisant * (Llantrisant Town ward)	Cross Inn, Rhiwsaeson
Llantwit Fardre	2	Llantwit Fardre * (Efail Isaf and Llantwit Fardre wards)	Efail Isaf
Llwynypia ^{c}	1	Llwynypia	
Maerdy ^{c}	1	Maerdy	
Mountain Ash East ^{c}	1	Mountain Ash East	Cefnpennar, Cwmpennar, Newtown
Mountain Ash West ^{c}	2	Mountain Ash West	Fernhill, Glenboi
Penrhiwceiber ^{c}	2	Penrhiwceiber	Miskin, Perthcelyn
Pentre ^{c}	2	Pentre	Ton Pentre
Pen-y-graig ^{c}	2	Pen-y-graig	Dinas, Edmondstown, Penpisgah, Williamstown
Pen-y-waun ^{c}	1	Pen-y-waun	Trenant
Pont-y-clun ^{c}	2	Pont-y-clun *	Brynsadler, Groes-faen, Miskin, Pontyclun, Tyla Garw
Pontypridd Town	1	Pontypridd Town * (Town ward)	Penygraigwen
Porth	2	Porth	Llwyncelyn
Rhigos	1	Rhigos * Hirwaun * (Penderyn ward)	Cwm Hwnt, Cefn Rhigos, Penderyn
Rhondda	2	Pontypridd Town * (Rhondda ward)	Hopkinstown, Maesycoed, Pantygraigwen, Pwllgwaun
Rhydfelen Central/Ilan	1	Pontypridd Town * (Ilan and Rhydfelen Central wards)	Rhydyfelin
Taffs Well ^{c}	1	Taffs Well *	Glan-y-llyn, Nantgarw, Tŷ Rhiw
Talbot Green	1	Llantrisant * (Talbot Green ward)	Ynysmaerdy
Tonteg	2	Llantwit Fardre * (Tonteg ward)	
Tonypandy ^{c}	1	Tonypandy	
Tonyrefail East	2	Tonyrefail * (Coedely, Collena and Tylcha wards)	Coedely
Tonyrefail West	1	Tonyrefail * (Penrhiw-fer, Thomastown and Tynybryn wards)	
Trallwn	1	Pontypridd Town * (Trallwng ward)	
Trealaw ^{c}	1	Trealaw	
Treforest	1	Pontypridd Town * (Treforest ward)	Glyntaff
Treherbert ^{c}	2	Treherbert	Blaencwm, Blaenrhondda, Tynewydd,
Treorchy ^{c}	3	Treorchy	Cwmparc, Ynyswen
Tylorstown ^{c}	2	Tylorstown	Penrhys, Pontygwaith, Stanleytown
Tyn-y-nant	1	Llantrisant * (Tyn-y-nant ward)	
Ynyshir ^{c}	1	Ynyshir	Wattstown
Ynysybwl	1	Ynysybwl and Coed-y-Cwm *	Roberttown, Buarth-y-capel
Ystrad ^{c}	2	Ystrad	Gelli

* = Communities which elect a community council
^{c} = Ward coterminous with community of the same name

== See also ==
- List of places in Rhondda Cynon Taf (categorised)
- List of electoral wards in Wales
