= Mountain Ash East (electoral ward) =

Former electoral ward in Rhondda Cynon Taf

Mountain Ash East was the name of an electoral ward in the Cynon Valley, Rhondda Cynon Taf, Wales. It elected councillors to Cynon Valley Borough Council and later Rhondda Cynon Taf County Borough Council. It merged with Mountain Ash West to form the Mountain Ash ward in 2022.

Its boundaries were coterminous with the community of Mountain Ash East, which covers the area of the village of Mountain Ash east of the River Cynon, including the areas of Caegarw, Cwmpennar and Newtown. According to the 2011 UK Census, the population of Mountain Ash East was 2,909. In 2012 the registered electorate was 2,208.

== Background ==
The ward elected two councillors to Cynon Valley Borough Council between 1983 and 1996. Since the creation of Rhondda Cynon Taf County Borough Council, Mountain Ash East has elected one county borough councillor. Since the creation of the ward in 1983, the ward was represented by Plaid Cymru councillor Pauline Jarman.

Following a local government boundary review, Mountain Ash East and Mountain Ash West wards were merged to become Mountain Ash, effective from the 2022 Rhondda Cynon Taf County Borough Council election. Pauline Jarman lost her seat at this election, after 46 years as a councillor for the area.

== Election results ==
Incumbent councillors are marked below with an asterisk (*)

=== 2017 ===
Rhondda Cynon Taff Council election, 4 May 2017
Party	Candidate	Votes	%	±%
Plaid Cymru	Pauline Jarman*	488		
Cynon Valley	Steve Carter	263		
Labour	Jackie Fox	240		
Plaid Cymru hold		Swing		

== See also ==
- List of places in Rhondda Cynon Taf (categorised)
- List of electoral wards in Rhondda Cynon Taf
