= 2017 Rhondda Cynon Taf County Borough Council election =

2017 Welsh local government election

Results of the 2017 Rhondda Cynin Taf County Borough Council election

The 2017 Rhondda Cynon Taf County Borough Council election took place on Thursday 4 May 2017 to elect members of Rhondda Cynon Taf County Borough Council in Wales. This was the same day as other 2017 United Kingdom local elections. The previous full council election took place on 3 May 2012 and the next full election took place in 2022.

== Election result ==
Seventy four council seats across fifty two electoral wards were up for election. Labour remained in control of the council, though lost thirteen seats overall, while Plaid Cymru doubled their numbers to eighteen. Labour council leader Andrew Morgan described the result as "a reasonably good outcome considering the circumstances we have been facing", while Plaid Cymru group leader Pauline Jarman said she was "slightly disappointed". A "shock" result was the election of a councillor from new party, The Cynon Valley Party, to the Penrhiwceiber ward.

Rhondda Cynon Taf County Borough Council Election 2017
Party	Seats	Gains	Losses	Net gain/loss	Seats %	Votes %	Votes	+/−
Labour	46^{[a]}			-13	62.2	46.0	46,266^{[a]}	-8.6
Plaid Cymru	18			+9	24.3	28.6	28,788	+0.7
Independent	4			0	5.4	8.3	8,335	-1.0
Conservative	4			+3	5.4	9.3	9,364	+6.7
Cynon Valley	1			+1	1.4	4.8	4,855	New
Liberal Democrats	1			0	1.4	1.3	1,344	-2.3
UKIP	0			0	0.0	0.6	647	+0.3
Green	0			0	0.0	0.1	134	-0.6
TUSC	0			0	0.0	0.1	63	-0.4
Socialist Labour	0			0	0.0	N/A	0	-0.5

^{[a]} - includes one councillor and 888 votes for the Labour and Co-operative parties

== Ward results ==
=== Aberaman North (2 seats) ===
Aberaman North 2017
Party	Candidate	Votes	%	±%
Labour	Linda De Vet*	671		
Labour	Sheryl Evans	646		
Cynon Valley	Andrew Chainey	512		
Plaid Cymru	Laura Owen	357		
Turnout				
Labour hold		Swing		
Labour hold		Swing		

=== Aberaman South (2 seats) ===
Aberaman South 2017
Party	Candidate	Votes	%	±%
Labour	Tina Williams*	759		
Labour	Anita Calvert*	727		
Plaid Cymru	Julie Williams	315		
Cynon Valley	Steven David Hughes	300		
Plaid Cymru	Diane Summerhays	246		
UKIP	Lea Dempsey	118		
UKIP	Craig Resoli	80		
Turnout				
Labour hold		Swing		
Labour hold		Swing		

=== Abercynon (2 seats) ===
Abercynon 2017
Party	Candidate	Votes	%	±%
Labour	Rhys Lewis*	850		
Labour	Elaine George	775		
Cynon Valley	Phil Williams	295		
Plaid Cymru	Clayton Francis Jones	178		
Conservative	Christine Ceaton	159		
UKIP	Ian Andrew McLean	143		
Green	John Matthews	134		
UKIP	Paul Simon Browne	98		
Conservative	Thomas Pinder	84		
Turnout				
Labour hold		Swing		
Labour hold		Swing		

=== Aberdare East (2 seats) ===
Aberdare East 2017
Party	Candidate	Votes	%	±%
Labour	Steve Bradwick*	1,158		
Labour	Mike Forey*	917		
Cynon Valley	Ray Dally	627		
Cynon Valley	Graham Marsh	586		
Plaid Cymru	David Alun Walters	363		
Turnout				
Labour hold		Swing		
Labour hold		Swing		

=== Aberdare West / Llwydcoed (3 seats) ===
Aberdare West 2017
Party	Candidate	Votes	%	±%
Labour	Ann Crimmings*	1,300		
Labour	Gareth Jones	981		
Labour	Sharon Rees*	957		
Cynon Valley	Andrew Thomas	819		
Plaid Cymru	John Daniel	738		
Plaid Cymru	Liz Walters	692		
Plaid Cymru	Spencer Jones	634		
Conservative	Steve Williams	628		
Conservative	Sian Heart	483		
Turnout				
Labour hold		Swing		
Labour hold		Swing		
Labour hold		Swing		

=== Beddau (1 seat) ===
Beddau 2017
Party	Candidate	Votes	%	±%
Labour	Richard Yeo*	516		
Conservative	Sam Trask	409		
Turnout				
Labour hold		Swing		

=== Brynna (1 seat) ===
Brynna 2017
Party	Candidate	Votes	%	±%
Labour	Roger Kenneth Turner	686		
Plaid Cymru	David John Evans	654		
Turnout				
Labour hold		Swing		

=== Church Village (1 seat) ===
Church Village 2017
Party	Candidate	Votes	%	±%
Labour	Graham Stacey*	722		
Conservative	Nick Tizard-Lee	468		
Plaid Cymru	Ioan Rhys Bellin	312		
Turnout				
Labour hold		Swing		

=== Cilfynydd (1 seat) ===
Cilfynydd 2017
Party	Candidate	Votes	%	±%
Independent	Stephen Belzak	392		
Labour	Barrie Morgan*	293		
Independent	Stephen Powell	65		
Plaid Cymru	Jason Mark Johnson	57		
Turnout				
Independent gain from Labour		Swing		

=== Cwm Clydach (1 seat) ===
Cwm Clydach 2017
Party	Candidate	Votes	%	±%
Labour	Mark Alan Norris*	358		
Plaid Cymru	Heidi Whitter	243		
Liberal Democrats	Karen Roberts	109		
UKIP	Edwin John Allen	45		
Turnout				
Labour hold		Swing		

=== Cwmbach (1 seat) ===
Cwmbach 2017
Party	Candidate	Votes	%	±%
Labour	Jeffrey Alan Elliott*	564		
Cynon Valley	Gordon Brian Sullivan	403		
Plaid Cymru	Ann Jenkins	389		
Turnout				
Labour hold		Swing		

=== Cymmer (2 seats) ===
Cymmer 2017
Party	Candidate	Votes	%	±%
Labour	Gareth Caple	879		
Labour	Margaret Tegg*	725		
Plaid Cymru	Nicole Griffiths	512		
Plaid Cymru	Mark Stevenson	379		
Turnout				
Labour hold		Swing		
Labour hold		Swing		

=== Ferndale (2 seats) ===
Ferndale 2017
Party	Candidate	Votes	%	±%
Labour	Susan Morgans	817		
Independent	Phil Howe*	583		
Plaid Cymru	Andrea Jean Jones	513		
Labour	Annette Davies*	498		
Plaid Cymru	Anna Jones	497		
Turnout				
Labour hold		Swing		
Independent hold		Swing		

=== Gilfach Goch (1 seat) ===
Gilfach Goch 2017
Party	Candidate	Votes	%	±%
Labour	Aurfron Roberts*	711		
Conservative	Emyr Wilkinson	82		
Liberal Democrats	Gerald Leslie Francis	69		
Turnout				
Labour hold		Swing		

=== Glyncoch (1 seat) ===
Glyncoch 2017
Party	Candidate	Votes	%	±%
Labour	Doug Williams*	340		
Plaid Cymru	Amanda Jane Ellis	169		
Turnout				
Labour hold		Swing		

=== Graig (1 seat) ===
Graig 2017
Party	Candidate	Votes	%	±%
Labour	Jayne Brencher	319		
Independent	Bob Fox	244		
Plaid Cymru	Richard Lindsay Martin	66		
Liberal Democrats	Amanda Jane Jones	31		
Turnout				
Labour hold		Swing		

=== Hawthorn (1 seat) ===
Hawthorn 2017
Party	Candidate	Votes	%	±%
Labour	Martin Fidler Jones	654		
Independent	Cathy Lisles	421		
Conservative	Donald Rees	87		
Plaid Cymru	Bob Humphreys	81		
Turnout				
Labour hold		Swing		

=== Hirwaun (1 seat) ===
Hirwaun 2017
Party	Candidate	Votes	%	±%
Plaid Cymru	Karen Morgan	723		
Labour	Richard Jones	347		
UKIP	Andrew Abraham	128		
Turnout				
Plaid Cymru hold		Swing		

=== Llanharan (1 seat) ===
Llanharan 2017
Party	Candidate	Votes	%	±%
Labour	Geraint Edward Hopkins*	608		
Plaid Cymru	Kathryn Elizabeth Germain	280		
Turnout				
Labour hold		Swing		

=== Llanharry (1 seat) ===
Llanharry 2017
Party	Candidate	Votes	%	±%
Independent	Wayne Owen	914		
Labour	Barry Stephens*	452		
Turnout				
Independent gain from Labour		Swing		

=== Llantrisant Town (1 seat) ===
Llantrisant Town 2017
Party	Candidate	Votes	%	±%
Labour	Glynne Holmes*	625		
Conservative	Adam Robinson	526		
Plaid Cymru	Gwen Eluned	262		
Turnout				
Labour hold		Swing		

=== Llantwit Fardre (2 seats) ===
Llantwit Fardre 2017
Party	Candidate	Votes	%	±%
Conservative	Joel James*	1,311		
Conservative	Mike Diamond	1,022		
Labour	Jacqui Bunnage*	421		
Labour	Bern Channon	330		
Independent	Jools Jones	249		
Plaid Cymru	Steven Thomas Owen	223		
Plaid Cymru	Gwion Eirian Rea	221		
Independent	Jonathan Bishop	100		
Turnout				
Conservative hold		Swing		
Conservative gain from Labour		Swing		

=== Llwyn-y-pia (1 seat) ===
Llwyn-y-pia 2017
Party	Candidate	Votes	%	±%
Labour	Wendy Lewis	261		
Independent	Jeffrey Gregory	221		
Plaid Cymru	Geoff Glyndwr Rees	181		
Turnout				
Labour hold		Swing		

=== Maerdy (1 seats) ===
Maerdy 2017
Party	Candidate	Votes	%	±%
Labour	Jack Harries	576		
Plaid Cymru	Hayley Harries	337		
UKIP	Janet Kenrick	35		
Turnout				
Labour hold		Swing		

=== Mountain Ash East (1 seat) ===
Mountain Ash East 2017
Party	Candidate	Votes	%	±%
Plaid Cymru	Pauline Jarman*	488		
Cynon Valley	Steve Carter	263		
Labour	Jackie Fox	240		
Turnout				
Plaid Cymru hold		Swing		

=== Mountain Ash West (2 seats) ===
Mountain Ash West 2017
Party	Candidate	Votes	%	±%
Labour	Andrew Morgan*	781		
Labour	Wendy Treeby	589		
Cynon Valley	Kelvyn Bevan	299		
Plaid Cymru	Nicola Benney	276		
Plaid Cymru	Danny Allen	251		
TUSC	Mia Hollsing	63		
Turnout				
Labour hold		Swing		
Labour hold		Swing		

=== Penrhiwceiber (2 seats) ===
Penrhiwceiber 2017
Party	Candidate	Votes	%	±%
Labour	Adam Fox*	792		
Cynon Valley	Gavin Williams	751		
Labour	Jane Ward*	648		
Plaid Cymru	Ieuan Benney	371		
Turnout				
Labour hold		Swing		
Cynon Valley gain from Labour		Swing		

=== Pentre (2 seats) ===
Pentre 2017
Party	Candidate	Votes	%	±%
Plaid Cymru	Shelley Rebecca Rees-Owen*	1,150		
Plaid Cymru	Maureen Owen Weaver*	963		
Labour	Ian David Jenkins	744		
Labour	Buffy Williams	690		
Turnout				
Plaid Cymru hold		Swing		
Plaid Cymru hold		Swing		

=== Pen-Y-Graig (2 seats) ===
Pen-Y-Graig 2017
Party	Candidate	Votes	%	±%
Plaid Cymru	Joshua Rhys Davies	555		
Plaid Cymru	John Lewis Cullwick	549		
Labour	Ken Privett*	474		
Labour	Christina Sian Slade	367		
Independent	Shawn Anthony Stevens	214		
Independent	Philip Jones	144		
Independent	Anita Lewis	133		
Turnout				
Plaid Cymru gain from Labour		Swing		
Plaid Cymru gain from Labour		Swing		

=== Pen-Y-Waun (1 seat) ===
Pen-Y-Waun 2017
Party	Candidate	Votes	%	±%
Labour	Helen Boggis*	269		
Plaid Cymru	Paul James	212		
Independent	Ted Edwards	178		
Turnout				
Labour hold		Swing		

=== Pont-Y-Clun (2 seats) ===
Pont-Y-Clun 2017
Party	Candidate	Votes	%	±%
Conservative	Kate Libby Jones	1,413		
Labour	Margaret Griffiths*	1,236		
Labour	Paul Griffiths*	1226		
Plaid Cymru	Carole Ann Willis	733		
Turnout				
Conservative gain from Labour		Swing		
Labour hold		Swing		

=== Pontypridd Town (1 seat) ===
Pontypridd Town 2017
Party	Candidate	Votes	%	±%
Plaid Cymru	Heledd Fychan	505		
Labour	Steve Carter*	324		
Conservative	Cheryl Angela Lavington	145		
Liberal Democrats	David Richard Payne	87		
Turnout				
Plaid Cymru gain from Labour		Swing		

=== Porth (2 seats) ===
Porth 2017
Party	Candidate	Votes	%	±%
Plaid Cymru	Julie Williams	899		
Plaid Cymru	Alun Cox	851		
Labour	Margaret Davies*	656		
Labour	Graham Smith*	574		
Conservative	Ken Williams	216		
Turnout				
Plaid Cymru gain from Labour		Swing		
Plaid Cymru gain from Labour		Swing		

=== Rhigos (1 seat) ===
Rhigos 2017
Party	Candidate	Votes	%	±%
Labour	Graham Thomas	442		
Plaid Cymru	Ashley James Wakeling	125		
Turnout				
Labour hold		Swing		

=== Rhondda (2 seats) ===
Rhondda 2017
Party	Candidate	Votes	%	±%
Labour	Tina Leyshon	558		
Labour	Rob Smith	554		
Plaid Cymru	Geraint Huw Day	333		
Plaid Cymru	Daniel Fraser Thomas	266		
Liberal Democrats	Steve Alan Duggan	221		
Conservative	Brian James	193		
Conservative	Gareth Fairclough	164		
Turnout				
Labour hold		Swing		
Labour hold		Swing		

=== Rhydfelen Central / Ilan (1 seat) ===
Rhydfelen Central / Ilan 2017
Party	Candidate	Votes	%	±%
Labour	Maureen Webber	627		
Conservative	Rachhpal Randhawa	128		
Plaid Cymru	Chad Anthony Rickard	124		
Turnout				
Labour hold		Swing		

=== Taffs Well (1 seat) ===
Taffs Well 2017
Party	Candidate	Votes	%	±%
Labour	Jill Bonetto	593		
Plaid Cymru	Christopher Edwards	362		
Conservative	Sep Bristo	240		
Turnout				
Labour hold		Swing		

=== Talbot Green (1 seat) ===
Talbot Green 2017
Party	Candidate	Votes	%	±%
Labour	Stephen Mark Powell	361		
Independent	Paul Baccara	323		
Conservative	Paul Thomas	128		
Plaid Cymru	David Rhys Roberts	75		
Turnout				
Labour gain from Independent		Swing		

=== Ton-Teg (2 seats) ===
Ton-Teg 2017
Party	Candidate	Votes	%	±%
Independent	Lyndon Walker	1,030		
Conservative	Lewis Hooper	611		
Independent	Clive Johnson	527		
Labour	Ray Butler	415		
Labour	Jean Hutchinson	394		
Plaid Cymru	Tony Hallett	226		
Turnout				
Independent hold		Swing		
Conservative gain from Labour		Swing		

=== Tonypandy (1 seat) ===
Tonypandy 2017
Party	Candidate	Votes	%	±%
Labour	Gareth Wyn Hughes	420		
Plaid Cymru	Wendy Allsop	301		
Independent	Philip Stephen Rowlands	224		
Independent	David Roberts	150		
Turnout				
Labour hold		Swing		

=== Tonyrefail East (2 seats) ===
Tonyrefail East 2017
Party	Candidate	Votes	%	±%
Labour	Dan Owen-Jones	818		
Plaid Cymru	Danny Grehan	755		
Independent	Paul Wasley	596		
Labour	Eudine Hanagan	572		
Conservative	Sheila Khalil	104		
Conservative	Victor Lloyd-Nesling	82		
Turnout				
Labour hold		Swing		
Plaid Cymru gain from Independent		Swing		

=== Tonyrefail West (1 seat) ===
Tonyrefail West 2017
Party	Candidate	Votes	%	±%
Labour	Alexandra Davies-Jones	759		
Plaid Cymru	Gregory Morgan Powell	368		
Conservative	Andrew Williams-Jones	188		
Independent	Karen Webb	148		
Independent	Stephen John Clee	99		
Turnout				
Labour hold		Swing		

=== Trallwng (1 seat) ===
Trallwng 2017
Party	Candidate	Votes	%	±%
Liberal Democrats	Mike Powell	719	60.8	
Labour	Allen William Bevan	369	31.2	
Conservative	Philip Sullivan	93	7.8	
Turnout		1,181		
Liberal Democrats hold		Swing		

=== Trealaw (1 seat) ===
Trealaw 2017
Party	Candidate	Votes	%	±%
Labour	Joy Rosser	657		
Plaid Cymru	Barbara Evans	445		
Turnout				
Labour hold		Swing		

=== Treforest (1 seat) ===
Treforest 2017
Party	Candidate	Votes	%	±%
Labour	Steve Powderhill	413		
Plaid Cymru	Danny White	86		
Conservative	Ann-Marie Mason	75		
Turnout				
Labour hold		Swing		

=== Treherbert (2 seats) ===
Treherbert 2017
Party	Candidate	Votes	%	±%
Plaid Cymru	Will Jones	1,212		
Plaid Cymru	Geraint Rhys Davies	1,192		
Labour	Scott Emanuel	890		
Labour	Anne Louise Morris	683		
Turnout				
Plaid Cymru hold		Swing		
Plaid Cymru hold		Swing		

=== Treorchy (3 seats) ===
Treorchy 2017
Party	Candidate	Votes	%	±%
Plaid Cymru	Alison Chapman	1,399		
Plaid Cymru	Sera Evans-Fear	1,365		
Plaid Cymru	Emyr John Webster	1,286		
Independent	Bob Harris	1,012		
Labour	Margaret Evans	726		
Labour	Gwilym Lewis	653		
Labour	David Morris	638		
Turnout				
Plaid Cymru hold		Swing		
Plaid Cymru hold		Swing		
Plaid Cymru hold		Swing		

=== Tylorstown (2 seats) ===
Tylorstown 2017
Party	Candidate	Votes	%	±%
Labour	Robert Bevan	856		
Labour	Mark Adams	703		
Plaid Cymru	Christine Betteney	244		
Plaid Cymru	Lee Cole	174		
Independent	Stephen Wilshire	433		
Turnout				
Labour hold		Swing		
Labour hold		Swing		

=== Tyn-Y-Nant (1 seat) ===
Tyn-Y-Nant 2017
Party	Candidate	Votes	%	±%
Labour	Clayton Willis	557		
Conservative	Craig Ford	215		
Turnout				
Labour hold		Swing		

=== Ynyshir (1 seat) ===
Ynyshir 2017
Party	Candidate	Votes	%	±%
Labour	Ryan Evans	414		
Plaid Cymru	Darren Macey	692		
Turnout				
Plaid Cymru gain from Labour		Swing		

=== Ynysybwl (1 seat) ===
Ynysybwl 2017
Party	Candidate	Votes	%	±%
Labour	Sue Pickering	719		
Plaid Cymru	Daniel Anthony Baish	510		
Conservative	Rhys Lewis	110		
Turnout				
Labour hold		Swing		

=== Ystrad (2 seats) ===
Ystrad 2017
Party	Candidate	Votes	%	±%
Plaid Cymru	Larraine Jones	945		
Plaid Cymru	Elyn Stephens	667		
Labour	Malcolm John Watts	660		
Labour	Dilys Jouvenat	650		
Turnout				
Plaid Cymru gain from Labour		Swing		
Plaid Cymru gain from Labour		Swing		

== By-elections between 2017 and 2022 ==
=== Rhondda (2019) ===
A by-election took place on 4 July 2019 after the death of Labour councillor, Robert Smith. The turnout was 28%.

Rhondda 2019
Party	Candidate	Votes	%	±%
Plaid Cymru	Eleri Griffiths	404		
Labour	Loretta Tomkinson	266		
Conservative	Alexander Davies	145		
Liberal Democrats	Karen Roberts	127		
Communist	Adrian Dumphy	18		

=== Ynyshir (2019) ===
A by-election took place on 5 December 2019 after Plaid Cymru councillor, Darren Macey, resigned his seat because of a conflict of interest with his new job for RCT Sporting Heroes. The seat was won by Labour.

Ynyshir 2019
Party	Candidate	Votes	%	±%
Labour	Julie Edwards	407		
Plaid Cymru	Adrian Parry	331		

=== Llantwit Fardre (2021) ===
A by-election took place on 6 May 2021 after a Conservative councillor, Mike Diamond, resigned his seat for personal reasons.

Llantwit Fardre 2021
Party	Candidate	Votes	%	±%
Conservative	Sam Trask	1,011		
Labour	Graham Colk	656		
Plaid Cymru	Ioan Bellin	464		
Independent	James Huw Williams	162		
Independent	Nick Tizzard-Lee	80		
Liberal Democrats	David Payne	73		

=== Penrhiwceiber (2021) ===
A by-election took place on 6 May 2021 to fill a vacancy after Cynon Valley Party councillor, Gavin Williams, was removed from his position after being absent from council meetings for more than six months. Williams stood as an independent at the by-election.

Penrhiwceiber 2021
Party	Candidate	Votes	%	±%
Labour	Ross Williams	954		
Independent	Gavin Williams*	384		
Plaid Cymru	Daniel Allen	194		

=== Tyn-y-nant (2021) ===
A by-election took place on 22 July 2021 following the death of long-standing Labour councillor, Clayton Willis.

Tyn-y-nant 2021
Party	Candidate	Votes	%	±%
Labour	Julie Barton	411		
Conservative	Rob Green	62		
Plaid Cymru	Ioan Bellin	35		
