= Tonyrefail East =

Electoral division in Rhondda Cynon Taf, Wales

Tonyrefail East is the name of an electoral ward covering the eastern two-thirds of the community of Tonyrefail in Rhondda Cynon Taf, Wales. It elects two councillors to Rhondda Cynon Taf County Borough Council.

== Description ==
The Tonyrefail East ward is divided from Tonyrefail West by a line that approximately follows the A4119 road which in turn runs close to the route of the River Ely. The ward includes the main village of Tonyrefail, as well as the villages of Thomastown and Coedely

According to the 2011 UK Census, the population of the Tonyrefail East ward was 5,927. In 2012 the registered electorate was 4,431.

== Background ==
The Tonyrefail East ward elected two district councillors to Taff-Ely Borough Council between 1983 and 1996.

In 1988 Tonyrefail East also became a county ward, electing one county councillor to Mid Glamorgan County Council in 1989 and 1993.

Since the creation of Rhondda Cynon Taf County Borough Council, Tonyrefail East has elected one county borough councillor at each election since 1995.

== Election results ==
Incumbent councillors are marked below with an asterisk (*)

=== 2012 ===
Labour councillor Russell Roberts had represented Tonyrefail East since 1995 and had been Leader of Rhondda Cynon Taf Council since 2004. In the lead up to the 2012 local elections, Independent candidate Paul Wasley complained to the police that his election posters were being improperly removed by council staff. The council responded they were dealing with it as flyposting. Roberts lost his seat at the election.

Rhondda Cynon Taf Council election, 3 May 2012
Party	Candidate	Votes	%	±%
Independent	Paul Wasley	629	34.1	
Labour	Bob McDonald*	610	33.0	
Labour	Russell Roberts*	576		
Independent	Phil Doyle	549		
Plaid Cymru	Greg Powell	430	23.3	
Liberal Democrats	Hendrik Haye	178	9.6	
Turnout			38.4	
Independent gain from Labour		Swing		
Labour hold		Swing		

=== 2017 ===
Bob McDonald stood down at this election. Eudine Hanagan, Labour councillor for Tonyrefail West for 18 years, chose to stand in Tonyrefail East (the ward she lived in) though she failed to win a seat.

Rhondda Cynon Taf Council election, 4 May 2017
Party	Candidate	Votes	%	±%
Labour	Dan Owen-Jones	818	36.0	
Plaid Cymru	Danny Grehan	755	33.2	
Independent	Paul Wasley*	596	26.2	
Labour	Eudine Hanagan	572		
Conservative	Sheila Khalil	104	4.6	
Conservative	Victor Lloyd-Nesling	82		
Turnout				
Labour hold		Swing		
Plaid Cymru gain from Independent		Swing		

== See also ==
- List of places in Rhondda Cynon Taf (categorised)
- List of electoral wards in Rhondda Cynon Taf
