= Mountain Ash East =

Mountain Ash East: Welsh: Dwyrain Aberpennar
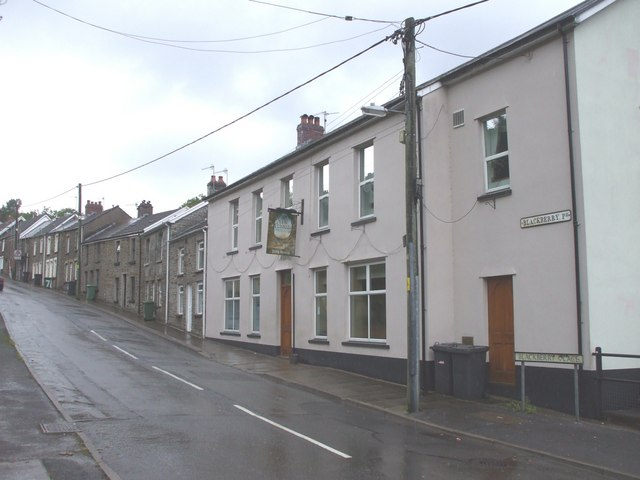
- Blackberry Place, Cefnpennar
- Population: 2,909 (2011)
- OS grid reference: ST025915
- Principal area: Rhondda Cynon Taf
- Preserved county: Mid Glamorgan
- Country: Wales
- Sovereign state: United Kingdom
- Post town: MOUNTAIN ASH
- Postcode district: CF45
- Dialling code: 01443
- Police: South Wales
- Fire: South Wales
- Ambulance: Welsh
- UK Parliament: Cynon Valley
- Senedd Cymru – Welsh Parliament: Cynon Valley
- List of places UK Wales Rhondda Cynon Taf 51.683°N 3.372°W Map of the community

Mountain Ash East is a community (and former electoral ward) in Rhondda Cynon Taf, Wales. It primarily includes the part of the town of Mountain Ash east of the River Cynon. The community was formed in 2016 when the larger community of Mountain Ash was divided into East and West to match the ward boundaries.

== History and description ==
The Mountain Ash East community came into effect on 1 December 2016 following the enactment of The Rhondda Cynon Taf (Communities) Order 2016. It includes the village of Mountain Ash to the east of the River Cynon and also the villages of Newtown, Caegarw, Cwmpennar and Cefnpennar.

According to the 2011 UK Census Mountain Ash East had a population of 2,909.

Mountain Ash East includes the village's Grade II listed St Margaret's Church, designed by John Pollard Seddon.

== Electoral ward ==
An electoral ward of Mountain Ash East pre-existed the community. The ward elected one county councillor to Rhondda Cynon Taf County Borough Council.

Since 1995 the ward had been represented on the council by Plaid Cymru councillor, Pauline Jarman, who was previously a councillor on Cynon Valley Borough Council. She first stood for election in 1976.

Cllr Jarman had been leader of the Plaid Cymru group on Rhondda Cynon Taff Council since 1996. The Plaid Cymru numbers doubled to 18 after the May 2017 election and were the official opposition on the council.

Following a local government boundary review, the wards of Mountain Ash East and Mountain Ash West were merged to create a new single ward of Mountain Ash, electing two councillors. Pauline Jarman stood for election in the new ward at the 2022 Rhondda Cynon Taf County Borough Council election, though failed to win a seat.
