= Aberdare East =

Aberdare East: Welsh: Dwyrain Aberdâr
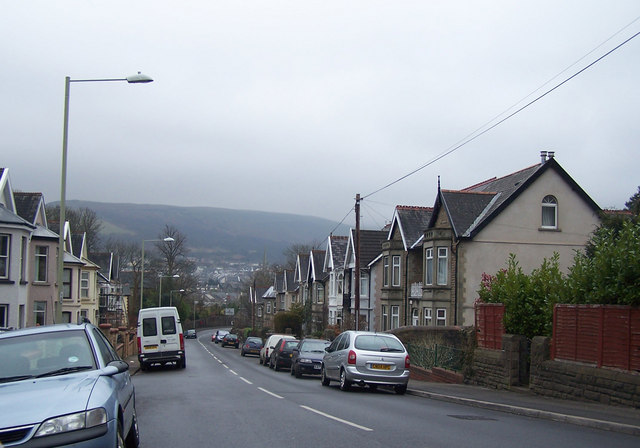
- Abernant Road, Abernant, looking towards Aberdare
- Population: 6,561
- OS grid reference: SO005025
- Principal area: Rhondda Cynon Taf
- Preserved county: Mid Glamorgan
- Country: Wales
- Sovereign state: United Kingdom
- Post town: ABERDARE
- Postcode district: CF44
- Dialling code: 01685
- Police: South Wales
- Fire: South Wales
- Ambulance: Welsh
- UK Parliament: Cynon Valley
- Senedd Cymru – Welsh Parliament: Cynon Valley
- List of places UK Wales Rhondda Cynon Taf 51°43′13″N 3°25′58″W Map of the community

Aberdare East is a local government community and electoral ward in Rhondda Cynon Taf, Wales. The community was formed in 2016, when the former community of Aberdare was split into two. Aberdare East includes the main town of Aberdare.

== Community ==
The Aberdare East community came into effect on 1 December 2016, following the enactment of The Rhondda Cynon Taf (Communities) Order 2016. The area includes the town centre of Aberdare, as well as Robertstown and the nearby village of Abernant

According to the 2011 UK Census, Aberdare East had a population of 6,561.

== Electoral ward ==
An electoral ward of Aberdare East exists, electing two county councillors to Rhondda Cynon Taf County Borough Council since 1995.

Since 1995, the ward has consistently elected Welsh Labour councillors. Cllr Mike Forey has represented the ward on the new county council since 1995, while fellow councillor Steve Bradwick has represented the ward since 2008.

Rhondda Cynon Taff Council election, 4 May 2017
Party	Candidate	Votes	%	±%
Labour	Steve BRADWICK	1158		
Labour	Mike FOREY	917		
Cynon Valley	Ray DALLY	627		
Cynon Valley	Graham MARSH	586		
Plaid Cymru	David Alun WALTERS	363		

Cllr Bradwick took over at the 2008 election from Dr Shah Imtiaz, who had represented the ward for the Labour Party on Cynon Valley Borough Council and Rhondda Cynon Taf Council since 1973.

== See also ==
- Aberdare West
