= 2012 Rhondda Cynon Taf County Borough Council election =

Council election

Results of the 2012 Rhondda Cynin Taf County Borough Council election

The 2012 Rhondda Cynon Taf Council election took place on Thursday 3 May 2012 to elect members of Rhondda Cynon Taf County Borough Council in Wales. This was the same day as other United Kingdom local elections. It was preceded by the 2008 election and the next full council election took place on 4 May 2017.

== Election result ==
Labour remained in firm control of the council, after gaining an additional 16 seats. However, the leader of the council, Labour councillor Russell Roberts, lost his seat to an independent candidate (in the Tonyrefail East ward) by 34 votes.

Rhondda Cynon Taf Borough Council Election 2012
Party	Seats	Gains	Losses	Net gain/loss	Seats %	Votes %	Votes	+/−
Labour	60			+16	80.0	54.6	35,568	+6.4
Plaid Cymru	9			-12	12.0	27.9	18,162	-9.7
Independent	4			-1	5.3	9.3	6,085	+2.4
Liberal Democrats	1			-3	1.3	3.6	2,350	-1.7
Conservative	1			0	1.3	2.6	1,700	+1.8
Green	0			0	0.0	0.7	460	+0.1
TUSC	0			0	0.0	0.5	298	New
Socialist Labour	0			0	0.0	0.5	275	New
UKIP	0			0	0.0	0.3	217	-0.2
Communist	-	-	-	-	-	-	-	-0.1

== Ward results ==
=== Aberaman North (2 seats) ===
Aberaman North 2012
Party	Candidate	Votes	%	±%
Labour	Anthony Christopher*	900	69.4	
Labour	Linda De Vet*	781		
Plaid Cymru	Wayne Lloyd	396	30.6	
Turnout			32.9	
Labour hold		Swing		
Labour hold		Swing		

=== Aberaman South (2 seats) ===
Aberaman South 2012
Party	Candidate	Votes	%	±%
Labour	Anita Calvert	890	64.0	
Labour	Tina Williams	861		
Plaid Cymru	Howard Davies*	501	36.0	
Plaid Cymru	Lea Dempsey	350		
Turnout			39.6	
Labour gain from Plaid Cymru		Swing		
Labour gain from Plaid Cymru		Swing		

=== Abercynon (2 seats) ===
Abercynon 2012
Party	Candidate	Votes	%	±%
Labour	Alby Davies*	903	45.6	
Labour	Rhys Lewis	681		
Independent	Stuart Gregory*	519	26.2	
Plaid Cymru	Rhodri Owen	334	16.9	
Green	John Matthews	161	8.1	
Liberal Democrats	Sean Hackett	65	3.3	
Turnout				
Labour hold		Swing		
Labour gain from Independent		Swing		

=== Aberdare East (2 seats) ===
Aberdare East 2012
Party	Candidate	Votes	%	±%
Labour	Steve Bradwick*	1,414	71.0	
Labour	Mike Forey*	1,269		
Plaid Cymru	David Alun Walters	578	29.0	
Turnout			36.3	
Labour hold		Swing		
Labour hold		Swing		

=== Aberdare West / Llwydcoed (3 seats) ===
Aberdare West 2012
Party	Candidate	Votes	%	±%
Labour	Ann Crimmings*	1,306	55.5	
Labour	John Davies	1,118		
Labour	Sharon Rees	1,095		
Plaid Cymru	John Daniel*	1049	44.5	
Plaid Cymru	Liz Walters*	934		
Plaid Cymru	Wayne Richards	899		
Turnout			32.7	
Labour hold		Swing		
Labour gain from Plaid Cymru		Swing		
Labour gain from Plaid Cymru		Swing		

=== Beddau (1 seat) ===
Beddau 2012
Party	Candidate	Votes	%	±%
Labour	Richard Yeo	661	69.5	
Independent	Mike Sinclair-Thomson	174	18.3	
Plaid Cymru	James Radcliffe	116	12.2	
Turnout			29.5	
Labour gain from Independent		Swing		

=== Brynna (1 seat) ===
Roger Turner, elected as an independent in 2004 and 2008 stood as a Labour candidate.

Brynna 2012
Party	Candidate	Votes	%	±%
Labour	Roger Turner*	771	78.4	
Plaid Cymru	Mick Tems	213	21.6	
Turnout			32.7	
Labour gain from Independent		Swing		

=== Church Village (1 seat) ===
Church Village 2012
Party	Candidate	Votes	%	±%
Labour	Graham Stacey*	657	18.6	
Plaid Cymru	Rhys Watkins	189	64.7	
Conservative	Christopher Norton	169	16.7	
Turnout			29.0	
Labour hold		Swing		

=== Cilfynydd (1 seat) ===
Cilfynydd 2012
Party	Candidate	Votes	%	±%
Labour	Barrie Morgan	354	48.4	
Independent	Stephen Belzak	189	25.8	
Liberal Democrats	James Hackett	132	18.0	
Plaid Cymru	Stuart Fisher	57	7.8	
Turnout			35.0	
Labour gain from Liberal Democrats		Swing		

=== Cwm Clydach (1 seat) ===
Cwm Clydach 2012
Party	Candidate	Votes	%	±%
Labour	Mark Norris*	508	69.8	
Plaid Cymru	Heidi Whitter	220	30.2	
Turnout			33.6	
Labour hold		Swing		

=== Cwmbach (1 seat) ===
Cwmbach 2012
Party	Candidate	Votes	%	±%
Labour	Jeffrey Elliot*	757	63.5	
Plaid Cymru	Adrian Jarman	436	36.5	
Turnout			35.8	
Labour hold		Swing		

=== Cymmer (2 seats) ===
Cymmer 2012
Party	Candidate	Votes	%	±%
Labour	Chris Williams	989	69.7	
Labour	Margaret Tegg*	972		
Plaid Cymru	Nicole Griffiths	430	30.3	
Plaid Cymru	Edwyn Parry	331		
Turnout			34.4	
Labour hold		Swing		
Labour hold		Swing		

=== Ferndale (2 seats) ===
Ferndale 2012
Party	Candidate	Votes	%	±%
Independent	Philip Howe	952	49.0	
Labour	Annette Davies*	604	31.1	
Labour	Ceri Jones*	463		
Plaid Cymru	Norma Williams	385	19.8	
Independent	Martin Rees	323		
Turnout			46.8	
Labour hold		Swing		
Independent gain from Labour		Swing		

=== Gilfach Goch (1 seat) ===
Gilfach Goch 2012
Party	Candidate	Votes	%	±%
Labour	Aufron Roberts	826	77.3	
Liberal Democrats	Gerald Francis	213	19.9	
Conservative	Emyr Wilkinson	30	2.8	
Turnout			46.8	
Labour hold		Swing		

=== Glyncoch (1 seat) ===
Glyncoch 2012
Party	Candidate	Votes	%	±%
Labour	Doug Williams*	Unopposed		
Labour hold		Swing		

=== Graig (1 seat) ===
Graig 2012
Party	Candidate	Votes	%	±%
Labour	Joyce Cass*	339	59.2	
Independent	Bob Fox	140	24.4	
Plaid Cymru	Jennifer Hughes	65	11.3	
Liberal Democrats	George Summers	21	3.7	
TUSC	Glyn Matthews	8	1.4	
Turnout			33.1	
Labour hold		Swing		

=== Hawthorn (1 seat) ===
Hawthorn 2012
Party	Candidate	Votes	%	±%
Labour	Teressa Bates*	482	52.6	
Plaid Cymru	Iago ap Steffan	352	38.4	
Liberal Democrats	Jeanette Jones	83	9.1	
Turnout			32.7	
Labour hold		Swing		

=== Hirwaun (1 seat) ===
Hirwaun 2012
Party	Candidate	Votes	%	±%
Plaid Cymru	Karen Morgan*	712	61.2	
Labour	Jennifer Hartwell	452	38.8	
Turnout			36.6	
Plaid Cymru hold		Swing		

=== Llanharan (1 seat) ===
Llanharan 2012
Party	Candidate	Votes	%	±%
Labour	Geraint Hopkins*	510	66.1	
Plaid Cymru	J. Dilworth	262	33.9	
Turnout			31.0	
Labour hold		Swing		

=== Llanharry (1 seat) ===
Llanharry 2012
Party	Candidate	Votes	%	±%
Labour	Barry Stephens	600	70.8	
Plaid Cymru	Julie Dilworth	247	29.2	
Turnout			31.6	
Labour gain from Plaid Cymru		Swing		

=== Llantrisant Town (1 seat) ===
Llantrisant Town 2012
Party	Candidate	Votes	%	±%
Labour	Glynne Holmes*	940	69.6	
Plaid Cymru	Steven Harry	248	18.4	
Conservative	Ann-Marie Mason	162	12.0	
Turnout			35.9	
Labour hold		Swing		

=== Llantwit Fardre (2 seats) ===
Llantwit Fardre 2012
Party	Candidate	Votes	%	±%
Conservative	Joel James*	630	37.4	
Labour	Jacqui Bunnage	535	31.8	
Labour	Bev Channon	481		
Conservative	Alex Coombs	421		
Independent	Jools Jones	275	16.3	
Independent	Margaret Burtonwood*	260		
Plaid Cymru	Steven Owen	243		
Plaid Cymru	Steven Thomas	175		
Turnout			35.0	
Conservative hold		Swing		
Labour gain from Independent		Swing		

=== Llwyn-y-pia (1 seat) ===
Llwyn-Y-Pia 2012
Party	Candidate	Votes	%	±%
Labour	Sylvia Jones*	357	63.2	
Plaid Cymru	Naethan Jones	208	36.8	
Turnout			33.1	
Labour hold		Swing		

=== Maerdy (1 seats) ===
Maerdy 2012
Party	Candidate	Votes	%	±%
Labour	Keiron Montague	832	79.3	
Plaid Cymru	Gerwyn Evans*	217	20.7	
Turnout			44.3	
Labour gain from Plaid Cymru		Swing		

=== Mountain Ash East (1 seat) ===
Mountain Ash East 2012
Party	Candidate	Votes	%	±%
Plaid Cymru	Pauline Jarman*	544	60.4	
Labour	Wendy Treeby	356	39.6	
Turnout			40.9	
Plaid Cymru hold		Swing		

=== Mountain Ash West (2 seats) ===
Mountain Ash West 2012
Party	Candidate	Votes	%	±%
Labour	Andrew Morgan*	885	75.5	
Labour	Simon Lloyd*	770		
Plaid Cymru	Danny Allen	287	24.5	
Plaid Cymru	Nicola Benney	287		
Turnout				
Labour hold		Swing		
Labour hold		Swing		

=== Penrhiwceiber (2 seats) ===
Penrhiwceiber 2012
Party	Candidate	Votes	%	±%
Labour	Adam Fox*	1,104	64.5	
Labour	Jane Ward*	947	64.5	
Plaid Cymru	Lyn Warner	473	27.6	
TUSC	Mia Hollsing	135	7.9	
Turnout			33.9	
Labour hold		Swing		
Labour hold		Swing		

=== Pentre (2 seats) ===
Pentre 2012
Party	Candidate	Votes	%	±%
Plaid Cymru	Shelley Rees-Owen	867	51.2	
Plaid Cymru	Maureen Weaver	789		
Labour	Eilane Barnett	741	43.7	
Labour	Kris Evans	724		
Green	Leigh Evans	87	5.1	
Green	Linda Evans	82		
Turnout			43.6	
Plaid Cymru gain from Labour		Swing		
Plaid Cymru gain from Labour		Swing		

=== Pen-Y-Graig (2 seats) ===
Pen-Y-Graig 2012
Party	Candidate	Votes	%	±%
Labour	Ken Privett*	755	60.2	
Labour	Dennis Weeks*	754	60.2	
Plaid Cymru	Alison Jones	513	39.8	
Plaid Cymru	Mark Lewis	421		
Turnout			32.5	
Labour hold		Swing		
Labour hold		Swing		

=== Pen-Y-Waun (1 seat) ===
Pen-Y-Waun 2012
Party	Candidate	Votes	%	±%
Labour	Helen Boggis	378	48.8	
Independent	Anthony Edwards	228	29.4	
Plaid Cymru	Paul James	169	21.8	
Turnout			36.5	
Labour hold		Swing		

=== Pont-Y-Clun (2 seats) ===
Pont-Y-Clun 2012
Party	Candidate	Votes	%	±%
Labour	Paul Griffiths	651	27.3	
Labour	Margaret Griffiths	642		
Independent	Brendan O'Reilly	567	23.8	
Plaid Cymru	Jonathan Huish*	527	22.1	
Plaid Cymru	Merfyn Rea*	487		
Conservative	Dan Saxton	422	17.7	
Independent	Ken Forsdyke	334		
Independent	Gordon Norman	332		
UKIP	David Bevan	217	9.1	
Turnout			37.0	
Labour gain from Plaid Cymru		Swing		
Labour gain from Plaid Cymru		Swing		

=== Pontypridd Town (1 seat) ===
Pontypridd Town 2012
Party	Candidate	Votes	%	±%
Labour	Steve Carter	372	41.4	
Independent	Joe Payne	312	34.7	
Plaid Cymru	Richard Martin	123	13.7	
Liberal Democrats	Dewi Gray	92	10.2	
Turnout			40.9	
Labour gain from Liberal Democrats		Swing		

=== Porth (2 seats) ===
Porth 2012
Party	Candidate	Votes	%	±%
Labour	Margaret Davies*	941	53.5	
Labour	Graham Smith	809		
Plaid Cymru	Julie Williams*	662	37.7	
Plaid Cymru	Alun Cox	582		
TUSC	Cliff Jones	155	8.8	
Turnout			38.2	
Labour hold		Swing		
Labour gain from Plaid Cymru		Swing		

=== Rhigos (1 seat) ===
Rhigos 2012
Party	Candidate	Votes	%	±%
Labour	Graham Thomas	341	56.6	
Plaid Cymru	Beverley Hall	187	31.0	
Independent	Colin Woodley	75	12.4	
Turnout			42.6	
Labour gain from Plaid Cymru		Swing		

=== Rhondda (2 seats) ===
Rhondda 2012
Party	Candidate	Votes	%	±%
Labour	Tina Leyshon	623	44.4	
Labour	Rob Smith	531		
Independent	Graeme Beard	434	31.0	
Independent	Philip Price	303		
Green	Richard Reast	176	12.6	
Plaid Cymru	Hannah Fisher	169	12.1	
Independent	Ken Owen	155		
Turnout			36.8	
Labour hold		Swing		
Labour hold		Swing		

=== Rhydfelen Central / Ilan (1 seat) ===
Rhydfelen Central / Ilan 2012
Party	Candidate	Votes	%	±%
Labour	Maureen Webber	714	79.2	
Plaid Cymru	Bob Humphries	128	14.2	
Liberal Democrats	Lee Thacker	59	6.5	
Turnout			28.3	
Labour hold		Swing		

=== Taffs Well (1 seat) ===
Taffs Well 2012
Party	Candidate	Votes	%	±%
Labour	Jill Bonetto	589	62.1	
Plaid Cymru	Adrian Hobson	359	37.9	
Turnout			33.3	
Labour gain from Plaid Cymru		Swing		

=== Talbot Green (1 seat) ===
Talbot Green 2012
Party	Candidate	Votes	%	±%
Independent	Paul Baccara	400	44.9	
Labour	Jeff Woodington	375	42.1	
Plaid Cymru	Emyr Williams	66	7.4	
Conservative	Gregory Zuckerman	49	5.5	
Turnout			44.8	
Independent hold		Swing		

=== Ton-Teg (2 seats) ===
Ton-Teg 2012
Party	Candidate	Votes	%	±%
Independent	Lyndon Walker	645	34.6	
Labour	John David	593	31.8	
Labour	Ray Butler	536		
Liberal Democrats	Karen Roberts	282	15.1	
Conservative	Anna Rees	183	9.8	
Conservative	Ian Rees	175		
Plaid Cymru	Geraint Day	161	8.6	
Turnout			44.3	
Independent gain from Plaid Cymru		Swing		
Labour hold		Swing		

=== Tonypandy (1 seat) ===
Tonypandy 2012
Party	Candidate	Votes	%	±%
Labour	Craig Middle	651	65.4	
Plaid Cymru	Tina Davies	344	34.6	
Turnout			36.6	
Labour hold		Swing		

=== Tonyrefail East (2 seats) ===
Tonyrefail East 2012
Party	Candidate	Votes	%	±%
Independent	Paul Wasley	629	34.1	
Labour	Bob McDonald	610	33.0	
Labour	Russell Roberts	576		
Independent	Phil Doyle	549		
Plaid Cymru	Greg Powell	430	23.3	
Liberal Democrats	Hendrik Haye	178	9.6	
Turnout			38.4	
Independent gain from Labour		Swing		
Labour hold		Swing		

=== Tonyrefail West (1 seat) ===
Tonyrefail West 2012
Party	Candidate	Votes	%	±%
Labour	Eudine Hanagan	792	53.4	
Plaid Cymru	Danny Greham	360	24.3	
Independent	Shawn Stevens	331	22.3	
Turnout			32.1	
Labour hold		Swing		

=== Trallwng (1 seat) ===
Trallwng 2012
Party	Candidate	Votes	%	±%
Liberal Democrats	Mike Powell	537	46.4	
Labour	Allen Bevan	417	36.0	
Independent	Adrian Dumphy	120	10.4	
Plaid Cymru	Tony Richards	84	7.3	
Turnout			40.4	
Liberal Democrats hold		Swing		

=== Trealaw (1 seat) ===
Trealaw 2012
Party	Candidate	Votes	%	±%
Plaid Cymru	Rebecca Winter	244	22.4	
Labour	Joy Rosser	749	68.8	
Independent	Tina Ludlow	95	8.7	
Turnout			37.0	
Labour gain from Plaid Cymru		Swing		

=== Treforest (1 seat) ===
Treforest 2012
Party	Candidate	Votes	%	±%
Labour	Steve Powderhill	424	62.9	
Liberal Democrats	Royston O'Reilly	153	22.7	
Plaid Cymru	Ceri Carter	61	9.1	
Green	Paul Carter	36	5.3	
Turnout			17.6	
Labour gain from Liberal Democrats		Swing		

=== Treherbert (2 seats) ===
Treherbert 2012
Party	Candidate	Votes	%	±%
Plaid Cymru	Geraint Rhys Davies	1081	56.4	
Plaid Cymru	Irene Pearce	978		
Labour	Luke Bouchard	835	43.6	
Labour	Paul Russell	726		
Turnout			43.2	
Plaid Cymru hold		Swing		
Plaid Cymru hold		Swing		

=== Treorchy (3 seats) ===
Treorchy 2012
Party	Candidate	Votes	%	±%
Plaid Cymru	Cennard Davies	1252	53.3	
Plaid Cymru	Sera Evans-Fear	1247		
Plaid Cymru	Emyr Webster	1140		
Labour	Graham Thomas	1099	46.7	
Labour	Ron Jones	1096		
Labour	Hardev Singh	1012		
Turnout			41.3	
Plaid Cymru hold		Swing		
Plaid Cymru hold		Swing		
Plaid Cymru hold		Swing		

=== Tylorstown (2 seats) ===
Tylorstown 2012
Party	Candidate	Votes	%	±%
Labour	Robert Bevan	1003	67.0	
Labour	Mark Adams	910		
Socialist Labour	Craig Jones	275	18.4	
Plaid Cymru	Gareth Taylor	218	14.6	
Turnout			38.4	
Labour hold		Swing		
Labour hold		Swing		

=== Tyn-Y-Nant (1 seat) ===
Tyn-Y-Nant 2012
Party	Candidate	Votes	%	±%
Plaid Cymru	Carole Willis	116	12.8	
Labour	Clayton Willis	791	87.2	
Turnout			35.2	
Labour hold		Swing		

=== Ynyshir (1 seat) ===
Ynyshir 2012
Party	Candidate	Votes	%	±%
Labour	Lionel Langford	606	62.0	
Plaid Cymru	Christian Reed	372	38.0	
Turnout			39.5	
Labour hold		Swing		

=== Ynysybwl (1 seat) ===
Ynysybwl 2012
Party	Candidate	Votes	%	±%
Labour	Sue Pickering	587	42.8	
Liberal Democrats	Richard Isaac	414	30.2	
Plaid Cymru	Elaine Williams	316	23.0	
Conservative	Andrew Williams-Jones	55	4.0	
Turnout			38.8	
Labour hold		Swing		

=== Ystrad (2 seats) ===
Ystrad 2012
Party	Candidate	Votes	%	±%
Labour	Paul Cannon	979	57.9	
Labour	Malcolm Watts	804		
Plaid Cymru	Larraine Jones	591	34.9	
Plaid Cymru	Esther Nagle	536		
Liberal Democrats	Angharad Jones	121	7.2	
Turnout			37.3	
Labour hold		Swing		
Labour hold		Swing		
