= Rhondda (Pontypridd electoral ward) =

Former electoral ward of Rhondda Cynon Taf, Wales

Rhondda is an electoral ward in Rhondda Cynon Taf, Wales. The ward covers the northwest part of the Pontypridd community, including Hopkinstown, Maesycoed, Pantygraig Wen and Pwllgwaun.

== Town council ==
Rhondda is a community ward for Pontypridd Town Council, electing four town councillors.

== County Borough Council ==
The county borough ward elected two county councillors to Rhondda Cynon Taf County Borough Council. At the May 2017 elections Tina Leyshon and Rob Smith were re-elected for the Welsh Labour Party. Leyshon had represented the ward since 1999 and Smith since 2004.

Following a local government boundary review, effective from the May 2022 local elections, the ward was combined with the neighbouring Graig ward to become a new ward named 'Graig and Pontypridd West'. The new ward elects two county borough councillors.
