= Glyncoch =

Coordinates: 51.622°N 3.34°W

Glyncoch: Welsh: Glyn-coch

- Location within Rhondda Cynon Taf
- Population: 2,589 (2011 Ward)
- Principal area: Rhondda Cynon Taf
- Preserved county: Mid Glamorgan
- Country: Wales
- Sovereign state: United Kingdom
- Post town: PONTYPRIDD
- Postcode district: CF37
- Dialling code: 01443
- Police: South Wales
- Fire: South Wales
- Ambulance: Welsh
- UK Parliament: Cynon Valley

Glyncoch is a village to the north of Pontypridd in Rhondda Cynon Taf, Wales. It is also the name of an electoral ward.

== History ==
The name Glyncoch is Welsh language for 'Red glen' (glyn "glen, small valley" + coch "red"). How the name originated is unknown, but in 1900 a local journalist wrote a creative Victorian-era history of the location, suggesting that it was the site of a battle between the native Celts and the Romans. More likely is that it was named after an aspect of local nature, either a local outcrop of red sandstone or a large crop of berry-bearing gorse bushes.

The earliest noted settlement dates to Roman coins found in the area in the 1990s, when five coins ranging from the reigns of Empress Trajan through to Emperor Hadrian were discovered. Glyncoch lies halfway between known Roman forts built at Pen-y-coedcae and above Llanwynno, and so could have been located on a pathway between the two.

The area is mentioned in text related to Celtic priest Gwynno, who traversed the whole area and the founder of Glamorgan, and died in AD570. The area is also mentioned in the church book Liber Landavensis (Circa AD1750), now held at Llandaff Cathedral, which diarises the churches management of its lands and associated income, with fine fields and a brewery located between here and Daerwynno. During the Middle Ages, pilgrims travelled up the valley to the shrine of the Virgin Mary at Penrhys, with many taking refreshment or staying at an inn, believed by historians to be located close to the current Berwerdy Cottages.

By the 19th century, during the industrial development of the South Wales valleys, the land was owned by the Griffiths family. Instead of selling their land, they leased it and the mineral rights, and resultantly became very wealthy. On the death of their son, the Cardiff-based doctor Richard Griffiths, he was carried in procession from Pontypridd, through Glyncoch and Ynysybwl, to the church at Llanwynno where he is buried.

== Present ==
Glyncoch is a mainly social housing community between Pontypridd and Ynysybwl lying on the mountain opposite Coed-y-Cwm Within the community there are three grocery shops, Post Office, Pharmacy, Chinese Takeaway, Community Centre and two schools.

Bus services to and from the community are frequent with services to Pontypridd, Ynysybwl and Aberdare. Bus routes are operated by New Adventure Travel.

Glyncoch also forms an electoral ward, sending a county councillor to sit on Rhondda Cynon Taf County Borough Council. It is also a ward for Pontypridd Town Council, electing two town councillors.
