= Hirwaun, Penderyn and Rhigos =

Electoral division in Rhondda Cynon Taf, Wales

Hirwaun, Penderyn and Rhigos (formerly two separate wards Hirwaun and Rhigos) is the northernmost electoral ward in Rhondda Cynon Taf, Wales. It covers the communities of Hirwaun (including the village of Penderyn) and Rhigos. The ward elects two county borough councillors to the Rhondda Cynon Taf County Borough Council. It is the largest ward in Rhondda Cynon Taf.

While being the largest ward in Rhondda Cynon Taf, Rhigos was also one of the least populous. According to the 2011 census the population of the Rhigos ward was 1,700.

== 2022 ward changes ==
The area around the village of Hirwaun was formerly an electoral ward in its own right. Following a local government boundary review, Hirwaun was merged with the much larger Rhigos ward to become 'Hirwaun, Penderyn and Rhigos'. The number of councillors for the ward increased from one to two. This was effective from the May 2022 local elections.

== Local elections ==
Karen Morgan had been councillor for the Hirwaun ward prior to the election.

Hirwaun, Penderyn and Rhigos ward 2022
Party	Candidate	Votes	%	±%
Plaid Cymru	Karen Morgan	1,012		
Plaid Cymru	Adam Owain Rogers	811		
Labour	Rhian Grundy	471		
Labour	Richard Jones	464		
Conservative	Tara Robinson	164		

The Rhigos ward formerly elected one councillor to Rhondda Cynon Taf County Borough Council.

Rhigos ward 2017
Party	Candidate	Votes	%	±%
Labour	Graham Thomas	442	78.0	
Plaid Cymru	Ashley Wakeling	125	22.0	

Rhigos ward 2012
Party	Candidate	Votes	%	±%
Labour	Graham Thomas	341	56.5	
Plaid Cymru	Beverley Hall	187	31.0	
Independent	Colin Woodley	75	12.4	

Rhigos ward 2008
Party	Candidate	Votes	%	±%
Plaid Cymru	Rita Moses	396	58.2	
Labour	Graham Thomas	284	41.7	
