= Aberaman North =

Aberaman North: Welsh: Gogledd Aberaman
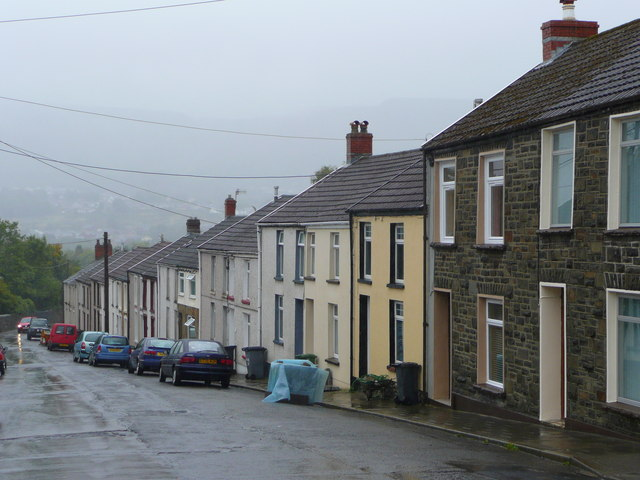
- Gwawr Street, Aberaman
- Population: 5,224 (2011 Census)
- Principal area: Rhondda Cynon Taf
- Preserved county: Mid Glamorgan
- Country: Wales
- Sovereign state: United Kingdom
- Post town: Aberdare
- Postcode district: CF44
- Police: South Wales
- Fire: South Wales
- Ambulance: Welsh
- UK Parliament: Cynon Valley
- List of places UK Wales Rhondda Cynon Taf 51°41′52″N 3°27′09″W Map of the community

Aberaman North is a community (and former electoral ward) in Rhondda Cynon Taf, Wales. It primarily includes the village of Aberaman. The community was formed in 2016 when the larger community of Aberaman was split into North and South.

== History and description ==
The Aberaman North community came into effect on 1 December 2016 following the enactment of The Rhondda Cynon Taf (Communities) Order 2016. It includes the village of Aberaman to the east and follows the valley of the Nant Gwawr to the west including Blaengwawr Quarry, reaching the edge of the St Gwynno Forest.

According to the 2011 UK Census Aberaman North had a population of 5,224.

== Governance ==
An electoral ward of Aberaman North pre-existed the community. The ward elected two county councillors to Rhondda Cynon Taf County Borough Council.

Since 1995 the ward consistently elected Welsh Labour councillors. Cllr Linda De Vet represented the ward since 2004, while fellow councillor Sheryl Evans represented the ward since a by-election in 2014.

The Aberaman North by-election took place on 24 July 2014 following the death of Cllr Anthony Christopher, who had represented the ward on Rhondda Cynon Taf Council since 1995, but died from leukemia in May 2014. Cllr Christopher was leader of the county council until his death.

Following a ward boundary review, Aberaman North was merged with Aberaman South to create a new ward of Aberaman, electing three councillors. This was effective from the 2022 Rhondda Cynon Taf County Borough Council election.
