= Cwm-Hwnt =

Coordinates: 51.7378°N 3.5735°W

Cwm-Hwnt is a tiny hamlet to the west of Rhigos and south of Cefn Rhigos in the Cynon Valley, one of the South Wales Valleys. In English the name means "Valley Beyond".

The post town is Aberdare and Cwm-Hwnt, at a distance of about 8 miles (13 km), is the most distant settlement from the town.

There was previously a through road to the geographically neighbouring villages of Cwmgwrach and Blaengwrach, in the Vale of Neath, which was referred to as the "Parish Road". But this road was closed in the late '90s as a result of the Sellar Opencast mine being dug, and the only routes to these villages are now via Cefn Rhigos and the main roads through Glynneath.

"The Plough" public house is no longer in use.
