= Graig, Pontypridd =

Coordinates: 51.59882°N 3.34439°W

Graig
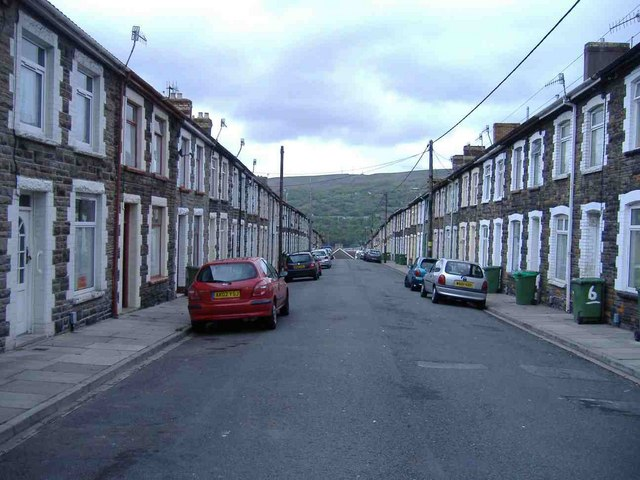

- Location within Rhondda Cynon Taf
- Population: 2,490 (2011 Ward)
- OS grid reference: ST070894
- Principal area: Rhondda Cynon Taf
- Preserved county: Mid Glamorgan
- Country: Wales
- Sovereign state: United Kingdom
- Post town: PONTYPRIDD
- Postcode district: CF37
- Dialling code: 01443
- Police: South Wales
- Fire: South Wales
- Ambulance: Welsh
- UK Parliament: Pontypridd
- Senedd Cymru – Welsh Parliament: Pontypridd

Graig is a historic district of the town of Pontypridd, Rhondda Cynon Taf, South Wales. It is also the name of an electoral ward for the town and county councils.

Graig was historically referred to as 'Rhiw' (hill). The area is closely associated with coal mining and consists largely of terraced housing. Notable collieries within the area include - Gelli-whion (Gelliwion) Colliery, Newbridge Colliery (1844), Pen-y-rhiw (Penrhiw) Colliery (c1870) and Pontypridd Maritime Collieries (1841). Graig today is also home to the Dewi Sant Hospital.

== Electoral ward ==
Graig is a ward for Pontypridd Town Council, electing two town councillors.

Between 1976 and 1996 Graig was an electoral ward to Taff-Ely Borough Council, electing two district councillors.

Graig subsequently became a ward to Rhondda Cynon Taf County Borough Council, electing one county councillor. Following a ward boundary review, it was merged with neighbouring Rhondda to form a new larger ward of 'Graig and Pontypridd West', electing two county borough councillors. The change was effective from the 2022 Rhondda Cynon Taf County Borough Council election.
