= Glynfach =

Coordinates: 51.61060°N 3.40928°W

- Location within Rhondda Cynon Taf
- OS grid reference: ST030908
- Principal area: Rhondda Cynon Taf
- Preserved county: Mid Glamorgan
- Country: Wales
- Sovereign state: United Kingdom
- Post town: PORTH
- Postcode district: CF39
- Dialling code: 01443
- Police: South Wales
- Fire: South Wales
- Ambulance: Welsh
- UK Parliament: Rhondda
- Senedd Cymru – Welsh Parliament: Rhondda

Glynfach (Welsh for 'small valley') is a district of the community and electoral ward of Cymmer, within the town of Porth, Rhondda Cynon Taf. There are no shops in Glynfach, however there is one pub - The Colliers Arms - and one parish church - St. John's Church. Glynfach consists of only a handful of streets, most of which are terraces.

Adjoining Glynfach is the small district of Britannia. Glynfach was also once the location of Glynfach Colliery, sunk in 1851.
