= Brynsadler =

Coordinates: 51.517993°N 3.399350°W

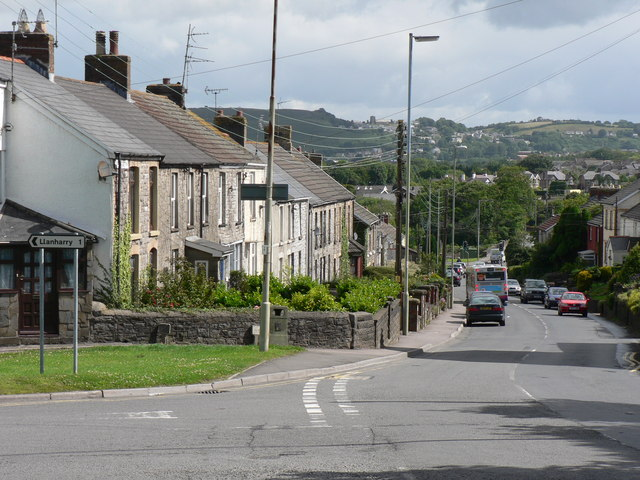
- A4222 through Brynsadler

- Location within Rhondda Cynon Taf
- OS grid reference: ST030807
- Principal area: Rhondda Cynon Taf
- Preserved county: Mid Glamorgan
- Country: Wales
- Sovereign state: United Kingdom
- Post town: PONTYCLUN
- Postcode district: CF72
- Dialling code: 01443
- Police: South Wales
- Fire: South Wales
- Ambulance: Welsh
- UK Parliament: Cynon Valley
- Senedd Cymru – Welsh Parliament: Ogmore

Brynsadler is a small village situated in Rhondda Cynon Taf, Wales, it is part of the community of Pontyclun. Pontyclun FC is based in Brynsadler Pontyclun F.C wiki

== Amenities ==
The A4222 main road to Cowbridge runs through the village; locally it is known tautologically as 'Brynsadler hill'. Brynsadler used to be home to the Crown Buckley brewery housed opposite the village pub, the Ivor Arms. The brewery was bought by S A Brain and eventually relocated to Cardiff. The brewery and brewery houses were demolished and a housing estate called "Clos Brenin" replaced it.

Brynsadler also housed a chapel, called Capel Zion, located opposite the post office. It closed down and was converted into housing accommodation.

Given its position between Llanharry and Pontyclun, Brynsadler is a pit stop for many summer activities such as fun runs.

== Brynsadler mill ==
Nestled along the River Ely, Brynsadler Mill is the oldest building in Pontyclun. Also known as “The Great Mill” or Y Felin Fawr, it has stood for centuries at its current site, where Cowbridge Road crosses the river.

Originally, the mill served as a grist mill, where local farmers brought their grain to be ground into flour. Its history stretches back to at least the 13th century, when it was mentioned in the 1262 will of Richard de Clare under the name Brosley Mill.

For much of its early history, Brynsadler Mill held a special status as the sole facility where tenants of the Lordship of Meisgyn and the Manor of Pentyrch and Clun were required to bring their grain. This obligation was owed to the chief lord, whose demesne included the mill. By the 16th century, however, this manorial duty had lapsed, and the mill was leased to local gentry, who then sublet it to working tenants.

Records show that by 1540, the mill was held by John Thomas Bassett of Pencoed in Capel Llanilltern, and by 1570 it had passed to his widow, Dame Elizabeth Walwyn. Soon after, it came into the hands of George Mathew, reputedly the illegitimate son of William Mathew of Radyr, owner of the Bryn Rhydd estate (now Lanelay Fach in Talbot Green).

In 1638, the mill was leased to Thomas Mathewe of Castell Mynach, and by 1671 it remained in his family, with his grandson Thomas Mathew holding the lease. By the late 18th century, Christopher Bassett of Lanelay held the lease for an annual rent of 18 shillings. It was during this period that the Bassett family undertook significant reconstruction of the mill. Over the following decades, the mill passed through numerous owners.

By 1935, Brynsadler Mill had fallen out of use, though its wooden water wheel remained intact until the mid-1960s. Today, the mill race—the channel that once carried water to power the mill—can still be traced in the adjacent field, a quiet testament to the industrial heritage that once thrived in this tranquil corner of Pontyclun. Source Pontyclun website

== Pontyclun FC ==
Founded in 1896, Pontyclun Football Club is a prominent amateur Welsh team based at Ivor Park in the village of Brynsadler, where they have played since the land was gifted to them in 1920. For the 2025–26 season, the club is competing in the South Wales Premier League Premier Division following their relegation from the Ardal Southern League. Known by their nickname "The Clun," the team famously provided the national motto "Gorau Chwarae Cyd Chwarae" (Best Play is Team Play) to the Football Association of Wales (FAW), a phrase that still appears on Wales' national playing shirts today. The club maintains a strong local presence through its thriving junior section, the Pontyclun Vikings JFC, and continues to host matches at its 2,000-capacity ground on Cowbridge Road under the management of Glyndŵr Davies.

== Ivor Woods ==
Ivor Woods in Brynsadler is a historic nature reserve dating back to at least the early 1800s, originally forming part of the Talygarn estate. Managed by the Pontyclun Town Council, this 200-year-old woodland is a key stop on the village's local history trails and is recognized for its diverse ecosystem, featuring central ash trees planted in the 1920s and older sycamore, beech, and oak trees along its perimeter. As of January 2026, the woods remain a vital community asset for walking and wildlife spotting, particularly for kingfishers and otters along the adjacent River Ely. It is also integrated into the National Forest for Wales network. Visitors often combine a trip to the woods with a visit to the nearby Ivor Arms, a dog friendly community pub in the heart of Brynsadler.
