= Penrhiw-ceibr =

Electoral ward in Cynon Valley, Wales

Penrhiw-ceibr (formerly Penrhiwceiber) is an electoral ward in the Cynon Valley, Rhondda Cynon Taf, Wales. Its boundaries are coterminous with the village and community of Penrhiwceiber. The ward elects two councillors to Rhondda Cynon Taf County Borough Council.

== Background ==
Penrhiwceiber was created in 1898 as a ward to Mountain Ash Urban District Council.

Penrhiwceiber was a ward to Cynon Valley Borough Council from 1973, electing two district councillors until 1983 when the representation increased to four councillors.

In 1988 a county ward of Penrhiwceiber was created, electing one councillor to Mid Glamorgan County Council at the 1989 and 1993 elections.

Since 1995 the ward has elected two county councillors to Rhondda Cynon Taf County Borough Council. The ward has been represented since 1995 by councillors from both Labour Party and Plaid Cymru, though both councillors were from Labour between 2004 and 2017.

A review of electoral arrangements by the Local Democracy and Boundary Commission for Wales resulted in the ward being officially renamed 'Penrhiw-ceibr', effective from the May 2022 local elections.

== Election results ==
Incumbent councillors are marked below with an asterisk (*)

=== 2017 ===
In a surprise result at the May 2017 council elections, veteran Labour councillor Jane Ward lost her seat to Gavin Williams, of the new Cynon Valley Party. The other seat was retained by Labour's Adam Fox.

Penrhiwceiber 2017
Party	Candidate	Votes	%	±%
Labour	Adam Fox*	792		
Cynon Valley	Gavin Williams	751		
Labour	Jane Ward*	648		
Plaid Cymru	Ieuan Benney	371		

Williams lost his seat in March 2021, due to not attending a council meeting for over 6 months.

=== 2021 by-election ===
A by-election was held on 6 May 2021 to fill the vacancy left by former councillor Gavin Williams' lack of attendance at council meetings. Gavin Williams stood as an independent at this election, but was beaten into second place by the winning Labour candidate, Ross Williams. Ross Williams was born and raised in Penrhiwceiber.

=== 2022 ===
At the May 2022 council elections the two seats were held for the Labour Party by Adam Fox and Ross Williams, who beat the Plaid Cymru candidate into third place.

Penrhiw-ceibr 2022
Party	Candidate	Votes	%	±%
Labour	Ross Williams*	960		
Labour	Adam Fox*	934		
Plaid Cymru	Lea Michael Dempsey	255		

== See also ==
- List of places in Rhondda Cynon Taf (categorised)
- List of electoral wards in Rhondda Cynon Taf
