= Llwyncelyn, Rhondda Cynon Taf =

Coordinates: 51.6132°N 3.3986°W

Llwyncelyn
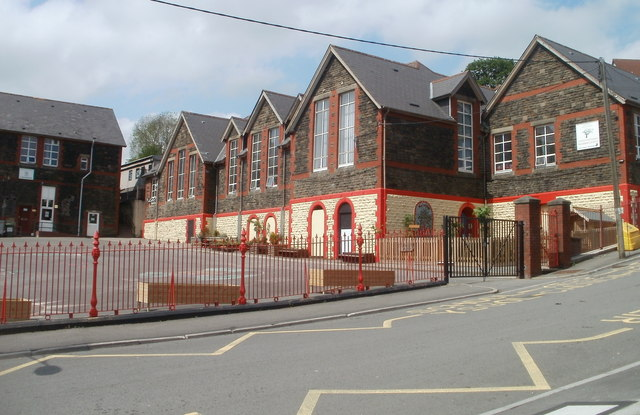
- Primary school

- Location within Rhondda Cynon Taf
- OS grid reference: ST032914
- Principal area: Rhondda Cynon Taf
- Preserved county: Mid Glamorgan
- Country: Wales
- Sovereign state: United Kingdom
- Post town: PORTH
- Postcode district: CF39
- Dialling code: 01443
- Police: South Wales
- Fire: South Wales
- Ambulance: Welsh
- UK Parliament: Rhondda
- Senedd Cymru – Welsh Parliament: Rhondda

Llwyncelyn is a district of Porth, Rhondda Cynon Taf. Consisting of five long terraces and two modern housing developments, Llwyncelyn has one shop and a parish church, St. Luke's Church.

Llwyncelyn is also where Porth Harlequins RFC play their home rugby union matches.

Nearby Nyth-Brân Farm was the home of athlete Guto Nyth Brân.
