= Brynna =

Coordinates: 51.538828°N 3.463203°W

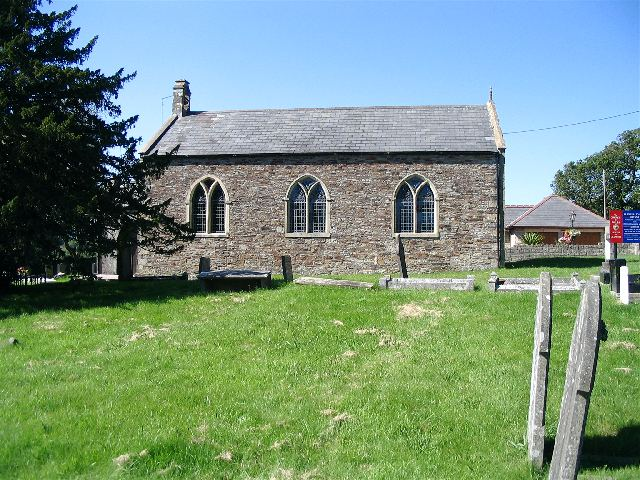

- Location within Rhondda Cynon Taf
- Population: 3,818 (2011)
- Principal area: Rhondda Cynon Taf
- Preserved county: Mid Glamorgan
- Country: Wales
- Sovereign state: United Kingdom
- Post town: Pontyclun
- Postcode district: CF72
- Dialling code: 01443
- Police: South Wales
- Fire: South Wales
- Ambulance: Welsh
- UK Parliament: Pontypridd

Brynna (Welsh: Brynnau) is a small village situated between Pencoed and Llanharan. It is located at the point where the borders of two Welsh county boroughs, Rhondda Cynon Taf and Bridgend, meet.

Due to Brynna's proximity to the M4 motorway as well as both Pencoed and Llanharan railway stations, it offers residents easy access to most of South Wales.

Brynna was originally called Brynna Gwynion but church records show that it was later shortened to Brynna from 1897 onwards.

== Education ==
Brynna is home to one primary school, Brynnau Primary School and is a feeder school for nearby Pencoed Comprehensive School. Welsh language provision is catered by Ysgol Gynradd Dolau in nearby Llanharan.

Opening in 1904, Brynnau Primary School celebrated its centenary year in 2004 with a number of events taking part in the village.

== Governance ==
Since 2022 Brynna has been within the electoral ward of 'Brynna and Llanharan' on Rhondda Cynon Taf County Borough Council. It forms the western half of the Llanharan community (bordered to the west by Bridgend County Borough) and included Brynna village, Bryncae and Llanilid. The ward elects three county councillors.

Brynna is also a community ward for Llanharan Community Council, electing six of the fourteen community councillors.

== Social life ==
Social life in Brynna focuses around The Mountain Hare and Whitehills pubs. A previous pub, the Eagle Inn, is now closed. Brynna FC is the local football (soccer) team and currently has 3 senior teams. The first team play in the South Wales Alliance League, Division 1 West; the second team play in the Bridgend & District First Division and the third team play in the Bridgend & District Second Division.

== Amenities ==
Brynna Woods and Llanharan Marsh were taken over by the Wildlife Trust of South and West Wales in 2010, with work undertaken to improve access for people to enjoy the area's wildlife.
