= Penrhiwfer =

Coordinates: 51.604°N 3.442°W

Penrhiwfer: Welsh: Penrhiw-fer
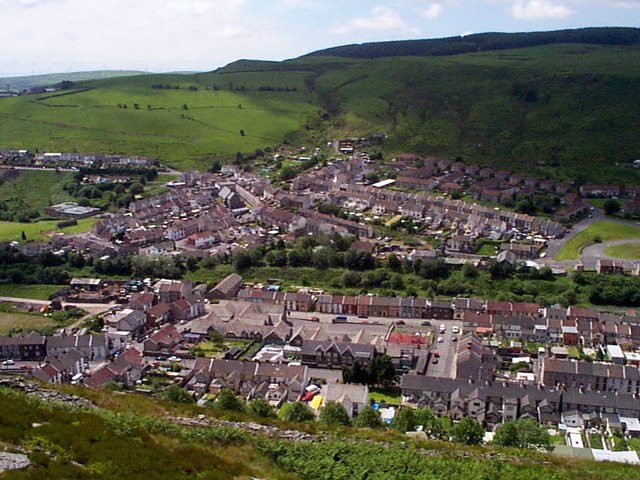

- Location within Rhondda Cynon Taf
- Principal area: Rhondda Cynon Taf
- Preserved county: Mid Glamorgan
- Country: Wales
- Sovereign state: United Kingdom
- Police: South Wales
- Fire: South Wales
- Ambulance: Welsh
- UK Parliament: Rhondda and Ogmore
- Senedd Cymru – Welsh Parliament: Afan Ogwr Rhondda

Penrhiwfer (Welsh for "short hill end") is a village located in the community of Tonyrefail, Rhondda Cynon Taf County Borough, Wales.

There is a church, a park and a school. The Park is adjacent to the new school and the church is located on the main road.

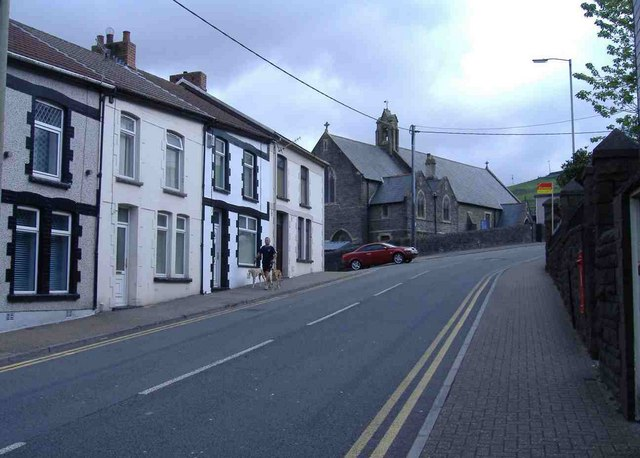
Penrhiwfer Road, Penrhiwfer

== Governance ==
Penrhiwfer lies in the Tonyrefail West ward for elections to Rhondda Cynon Taf County Borough Council. As of 4 May 2017 its County Councillor is Alexandra Davies-Jones.

Penrhiwfer is also a community ward for elections to Tonyrefail & District Community Council. Its Community Councillors are Daniel Owen-Jones, and Andrew Davies-Jones.
