= Tyn-y-nant =

Electoral ward in Llantrisant, Wales

Tyn‑y‑nant is an electoral ward covering the Tynant area of the village of Beddau, within the town and community of Llantrisant, Rhondda Cynon Taf, South Wales. It includes the area of Gwaun Meisgin.

The population of the ward in 2011 was 3,547.

== Electoral ward ==
Before 1996, Tyn‑y‑nant was a ward of Taff‑Ely Borough Council and Mid Glamorgan County Council.

Since 1996, Tyn‑y‑nant has been an electoral ward of Rhondda Cynon Taf County Borough Council, electing one county councillor.

A by‑election took place on 22 July 2021 to fill the position following the death of Clayton Willis, who had represented the ward since 1995/96. The election was won by the Labour candidate, Julie Barton.
