= Cross Inn, Llantrisant =

Coordinates: 51°32′10″N 3°21′48″W

Cross Inn
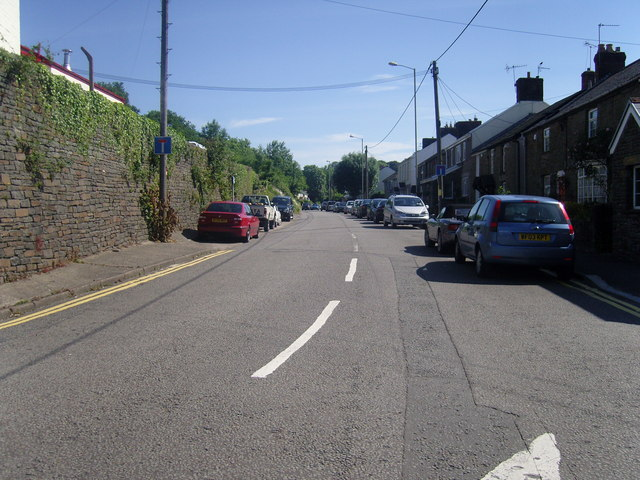

- Location within Rhondda Cynon Taf
- OS grid reference: ST 0554 8281
- Community: Llantrisant
- Principal area: Rhondda Cynon Taf
- Preserved county: Mid Glamorgan
- Country: Wales
- Sovereign state: United Kingdom
- Post town: Pontyclun
- Postcode district: CF72
- Dialling code: 01443
- Police: South Wales
- Fire: South Wales
- Ambulance: Welsh
- UK Parliament: Pontypridd

Cross Inn is a southerly district of the town of Llantrisant within Rhondda Cynon Taf, South Wales. It is bounded by the B4595 to the north, the A4119 to the west, and the A473 to the south, near the Afon Clun.

Cross Inn railway station was open to passengers from 1875 to 1952.
