= Ynysybwl (electoral ward) =

Electoral ward in Rhondda Cynon Taf

Ynysybwl is an electoral ward covering the valley of the Nant Clydach in Rhondda Cynon Taf, Wales. It elects two councillors to Rhondda Cynon Taf County Borough Council.

Its boundaries are coterminous with the community of Ynysybwl and Coed-y-Cwm, which as the name suggests includes the villages of Ynysybwl and Coed-y-Cwm, but stretching northwest to include the whole area of the Nant Clydach valley. According to the 2011 UK Census, the population of Ynysybwl ward was 4,664. In 2012 the registered electorate was 3,557.

== Background ==
The Ynysybwl ward was created in 1898 (128 years ago) for elections to Mountain Ash Urban District Council.

Ynysybwl was a ward to Cynon Valley Borough Council from its inaugural election in 1973, electing two district councillors.

Since the creation of Rhondda Cynon Taf County Borough Council and the 1995 election to the council, Ynysybwl has been a ward for the county borough, electing one county borough councillor. Following a local government boundary review, the number of councillors was increased to two, effective from the 2022 Rhondda Cynon Taf County Borough Council election. The electorate to councillor ratio had been 50% above the recommended average, though with two councillors the ratio was 25% below the recommended average.

== Local elections ==
=== 2022 ===
Former Labour councillor Sue Pickering, who had been elected multiple times for the ward, did not stand for re-election.

Rhondda Cynon Taf Council election, 5 May 2022
Party	Candidate	Votes	%	±%
Plaid Cymru	Amanda Ellis	629		
Plaid Cymru	Tony Burnell	581		
Labour	Richard Flowerdew	392		
Labour	Mark Adams	372		
Gwlad	Clayton Jones	112		
Gwlad	Jessica O’Donovan	92		
Conservative	Andrew Williams-Jones	70		
Turnout				
Plaid Cymru gain from Labour		Swing		
Plaid Cymru win (new seat)				
