= Graigwen =

Village in Mid Glamorgan, Wales

Coordinates: 51.61188°N 3.33658°W

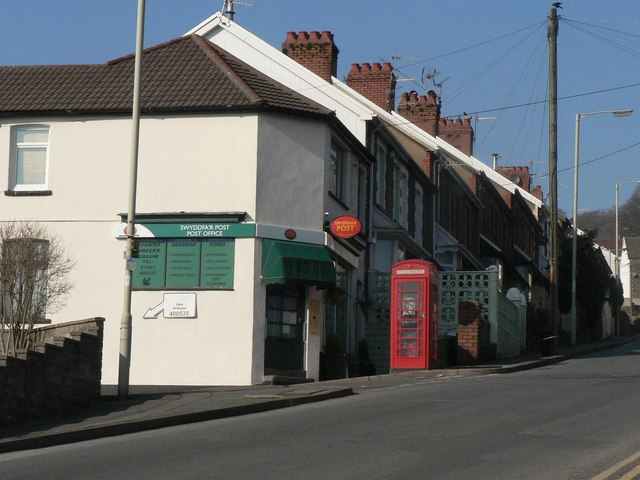

- Location within Rhondda Cynon Taf
- OS grid reference: ST068907
- Principal area: Rhondda Cynon Taf
- Preserved county: Mid Glamorgan
- Country: Wales
- Sovereign state: United Kingdom
- Post town: PONTYPRIDD
- Postcode district: CF37
- Dialling code: 01443
- Police: South Wales
- Fire: South Wales
- Ambulance: Welsh
- UK Parliament: Pontypridd
- Senedd Cymru – Welsh Parliament: Pontypridd

Graigwen (English translation = White-Rock) is the name of the large hill (Graigwen Hill) and the village or district located thereon, sited to the north of Pontypridd town centre and south of Glyncoch and Ynysybwl in the county borough of Rhondda Cynon Taf, Wales, and within the ancient parish of Llanwonno (Llanwynno). It falls within the Rhondda and Pontypridd Town electoral wards, and comprises the sub-districts of Pantygraigwen, Penygraigwen, the Whiterock Estate, and Lanwood. It is also bounded by the districts of Pwllgwaun and Hopkinstown.

Graigwen is characterised by a mixtured of the typical terraced housing to serve the nearby Tŷ-Mawr and Great Western collieries, substantial Victorian housing built originally to house the gentry and whitecollar workers of Pontypridd, modern housing estates, farms/rural land and woodland.

The main steep road running through Graigwen is called Graigwen Road, which continues on to Llanwonno, Ynysybwl and the Rhondda and Cynon Valley beyond. Graigwen was once home to the Daren-Ddu Colliery located in Lan Wood and numerous coal levels and stone quarries were cut into its hillsides. The large adjoining Craig-yr-Hesg quarry in neighbouring Glyncoch historically supplied much of Pontypridd's buildings with their finely dressed stone, and continues to do so today.

Graigwen is served by one pub - the Tŷ Mawr Hotel in Pantygraigwen, (which was used in the BBC Wales soap Belonging), one club - the Pontypridd District Club, a garage and two news agents/grocery stores one of which previously served as Graigwen Post Office. It is also home to the Glamorgan Mission For The Deaf, Coedylan Primary School and until 2005, Coedylan Lower Comprehensive before it eventually moved to the Albion site alongside the Upper campus at nearby Cilfynydd to form Pontypridd High School. Lan Wood, Lan Park Road and Coed-y-Lan are so called because of their proximity to Lan Farm above.

Graigwen was also once home to one of the oldest chapels in the South Wales Valleys known as the Carmel Baptist Chapel built in 1810, however this was demolished some time ago and is today occupied by the Plas Carmel retirement flats. Also in this area once was located the infamous Rhondda Cutting to the Taff Vale Railway which featured in the nearby rail accident at Hopkinstown in 1911.
