= Tyla Garw =

Coordinates: 51.525539°N 3.39885°W

Tyla Garw: Welsh: Tylegarw
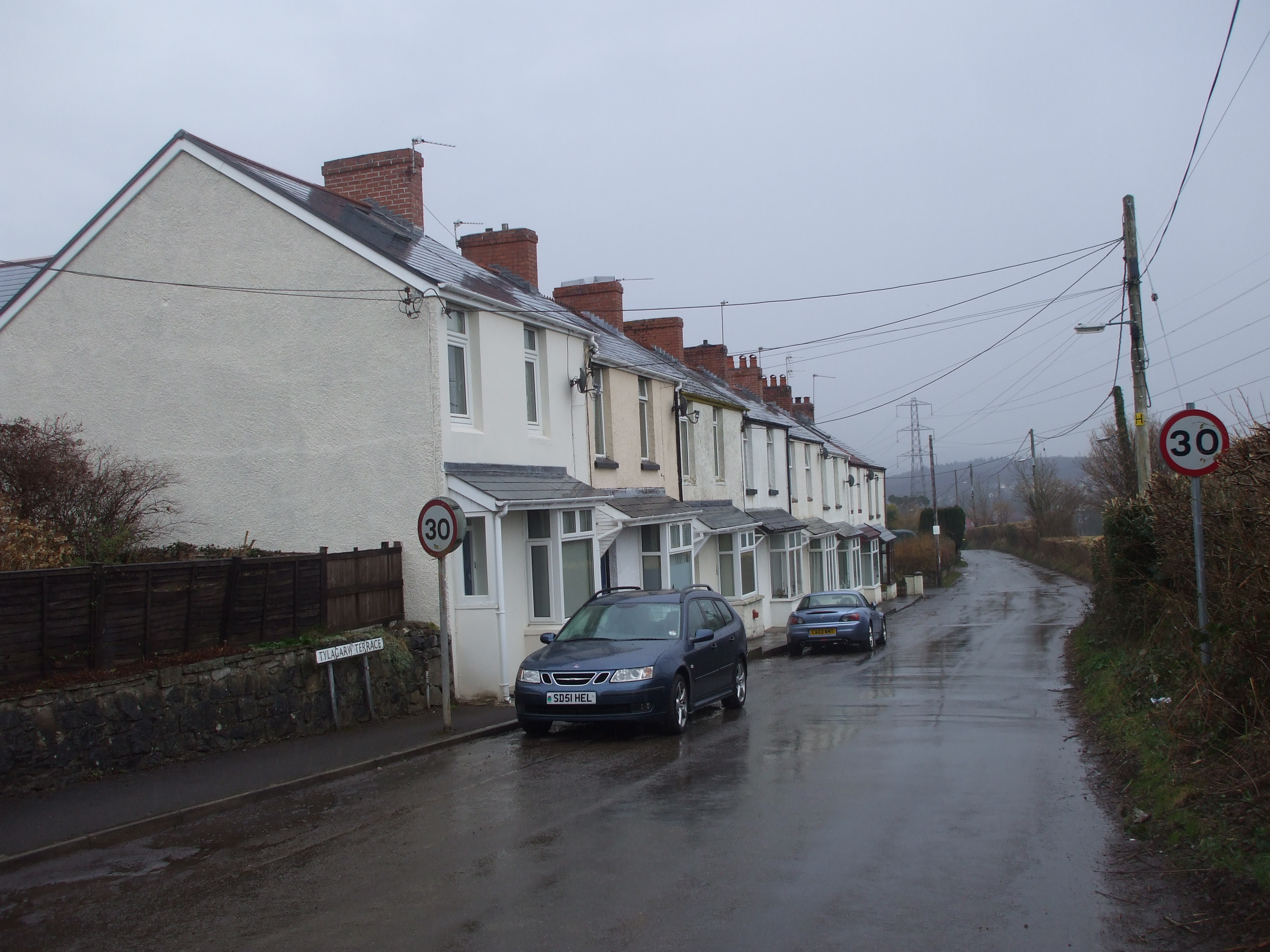

- Location within Rhondda Cynon Taf
- OS grid reference: ST 0305 8166
- Principal area: Rhondda Cynon Taf
- Preserved county: Mid Glamorgan
- Country: Wales
- Sovereign state: United Kingdom
- Post town: PONTYCLUN
- Postcode district: CF72
- Dialling code: 01443
- Police: South Wales
- Fire: South Wales
- Ambulance: Welsh

Tyla Garw (Welsh: Tylegarw) is a hamlet within the community of Llanharry in Rhondda Cynon Taf, South Wales, and is located to the west of the Afon Clun, near Pontyclun.

It is also an electoral ward to Llanharry Community Council, electing one of the nine community councillors.
