= Mountain Ash (electoral ward) =

Electoral ward in Rhondda Cynon Taf, Wales

Mountain Ash is an electoral ward in Rhondda Cynon Taf, electing two councillors to Rhondda Cynon Taf County Borough Council. It was re-created by the merger of Mountain Ash East and Mountain Ash West, following a local government boundary review, effective from 5 May 2022, the date of the 2022 Welsh local elections.

The Mountain Ash ward covers the communities of Mountain Ash East and Mountain Ash West. It is a two-seat ward.

== Background ==
Mountain Ash was created as an electoral ward to Mid Glamorgan County Council in 1988, subsequently electing a Plaid Cymru councillor, Pauline Jarman, at the 1989 and 1993 local elections.

Upon the creation of the new unitary authority of Rhondda Cynon Taf County Borough in 1996, Mountain Ash was divided between Mountain Ash East and Mountain Ash West wards.

== 2022 county borough election ==
At the 2022 Rhondda Cynon Taf County Borough Council election the council leader, Labour's Andrew Morgan, and the former leader (and leader of the Plaid Cymru group on the council) Pauline Jarman, were pitted against one another in the new ward. Morgan was the retiring councillor for Mountain Ash West and Jarman had been the councillor for Mountain Ash East. Morgan and fellow Labour candidate Wendy Treeby (who had also been a Mountain Ash West councillor) won the new seats.

Mountain Ash (2 seats)
Party	Candidate	Votes	%	±%
Labour	Andrew Morgan	1,547		
Labour	Wendy Treeby	1,016		
Plaid Cymru	Pauline Jarman	897		
Conservative	Kurt Thomson	168		
TUSC	Mia Hollsing	107		
Labour win (new seat)				
Labour win (new seat)				

Jarman had been a councillor for 46 years. After the result, she pledged to "wallow in the luxury of my family now" and spend her new free time finishing a book she had been writing.
