= Pen-y-coedcae =

Coordinates: 51.580°N 3.357°W

Pen-y-coedcae is a village within the electoral ward of Graig and Pontypridd West, between the town of Pontypridd and the village of Beddau, and is part of the community of the town of Pontypridd, within Rhondda Cynon Taf, South Wales.
