= Maesycoed =

Settlement in Rhondda Cynon Taf, Wales

Coordinates: 51.599492°N 3.351967°W

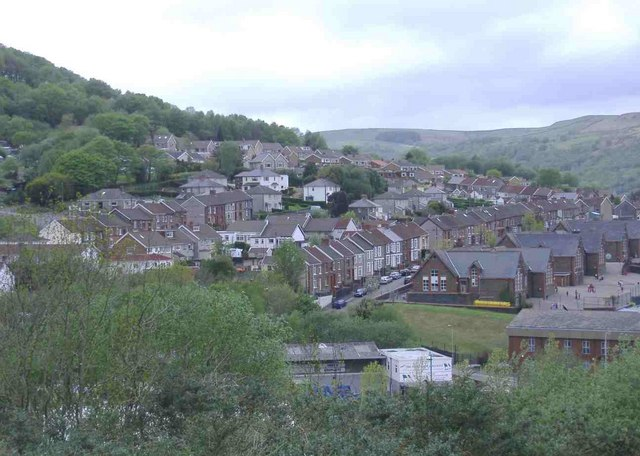

- Location within Rhondda Cynon Taf
- OS grid reference: ST064898
- Principal area: Rhondda Cynon Taf
- Preserved county: Mid Glamorgan
- Country: Wales
- Sovereign state: United Kingdom
- Post town: PONTYPRIDD
- Postcode district: CF37
- Dialling code: 01443
- Police: South Wales
- Fire: South Wales
- Ambulance: Welsh
- UK Parliament: Pontypridd
- Senedd Cymru – Welsh Parliament: Pontypridd

Maesycoed (Welsh for 'wood field') is a settlement to the south and west of Pontypridd town centre in the county borough of Rhondda Cynon Taf, Wales. Maesycoed is a district in the town of Pontypridd within the Rhondda electoral ward and is bounded by Graig to the south, Pwllgwaun to the east and Hopkinstown and Mynydd Gelliwion to the north.

== Description ==
Maesycoed is a predominantly residential district of Pontypridd, Rhondda Cynon Taf, Wales. It is listed in the county borough's adopted Local Development Plan as part of the Southern Strategy Area centred on Pontypridd.

The 2011 census counted 1,331 usual residents in Lower Super Output Area Rhondda Cynon Taf 021C, which covers almost the whole settlement, giving a density of roughly 35 inhabitants per hectare.

Rapid expansion followed the sinking of the Maritime Colliery on Maesycoed common in 1841. A contemporary press report hailed a "great find of coal" when the Four-Feet seam was struck in 1878, and the pit pioneered South Wales's first three-phase electric winding engine in 1908. Employment rose from 466 men (1908) to 956 (1918) and peaked at 1,286 in 1923 before nationalisation and falling reserves led to closure in June 1961. The growth of Maritime and the neighbouring pits saw coal owners lay row upon row of terraced housing in Maesycoed, Pwllgwaun and the Graig to accommodate their work-forces.

Maesycoed today is served by Maes-y-Coed Primary School on Lanwern Road; the English-medium school had 282 pupils on roll at its March 2024 Estyn inspection and was judged 'good' in all five areas.

Current planning strategy emphasises active travel: Policy SSA 21 of the Local Development Plan safeguards a community cycle route from Maesycoed to Porth, intended to link the neighbourhood into National Cycle Network Route 4 and the wider Taff Trail.
