= Coed-Ely =

Coordinates: 51.56267°N 3.416718°W

Coed-Ely: Welsh: Coed-Elái
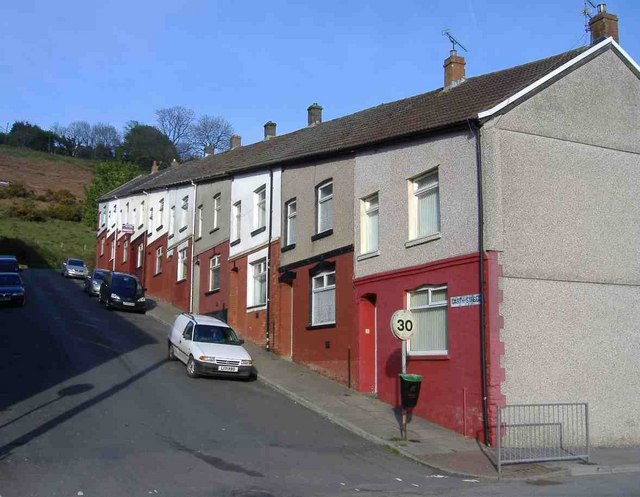
- Garth Street, Coed-Ely

- Location within Rhondda Cynon Taf
- Principal area: Rhondda Cynon Taf
- Preserved county: Mid Glamorgan
- Country: Wales
- Sovereign state: United Kingdom
- Police: South Wales
- Fire: South Wales
- Ambulance: Welsh
- UK Parliament: Pontypridd

Coed-Ely or Coedely is a small village located to the south of Tonyrefail in south Wales and is located in the County Borough of Rhondda Cynon Taf. The name Coed-Ely is a derivative of the Welsh words Coed-Elái which can be loosely translated into English as Ely Woods.

'Coedely' is also a community ward for elections to Tonyrefail Community Council.
