= Pwllgwaun =

Coordinates: 51.60335°N 3.34932°W

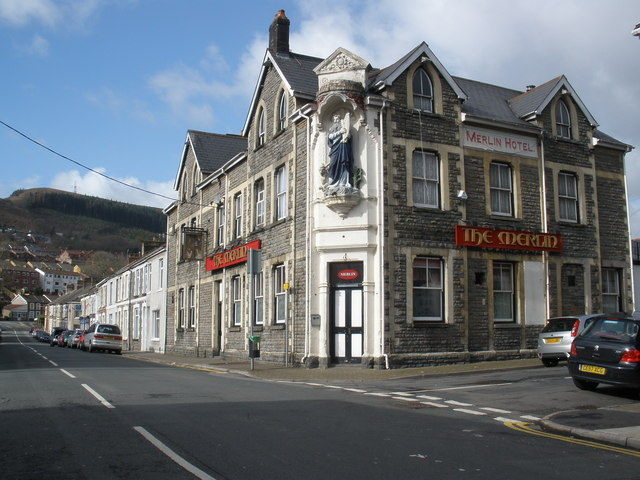

- Location within Rhondda Cynon Taf
- OS grid reference: ST0690
- Principal area: Rhondda Cynon Taf
- Preserved county: Mid Glamorgan
- Country: Wales
- Sovereign state: United Kingdom
- Post town: PONTYPRIDD
- Postcode district: CF37
- Dialling code: 01443
- Police: South Wales
- Fire: South Wales
- Ambulance: Welsh
- UK Parliament: Pontypridd
- Senedd Cymru – Welsh Parliament: Pontypridd

Pwllgwaun (or Pwll-Gwaun) is a village and small suburb of Pontypridd within the 'Rhondda' electoral ward, bordered by Hopkinstown and Graigwen hill to the north and east, the hillsides of Maesycoed above, and is located along the banks of the river River Rhondda. It consists largely of mining terrace type housing.

== Buildings and structures of note ==
Pwllgwaun for such a small area is quite famous, in that it is the home of rugby in Pontypridd with the home ground, Sardis Road (or as it is colloquially named the "House of Pain"). Also the area has a connection with Merlin, in as far as he was said to have been helped across a ford in the river here and blessed the area with good fortune. The impressive structure of the local pub (The Merlin) bears his name.

The local mine working beneath the village, known locally as 'Dan's Muck Hole' (sunk in 1875 and closed in 1948) was one of the most shallow in the area, sunk at a depth of only 45 yards, it was a deep mine in all but name. The legacy of its working were a lot of subsidence in the area and as a result many homes were affected. The entrance to the old pit can still be seen behind the home stand at Sardis Road rugby football ground, and is also commemorated by a nearby coal dram.

The main place of worship in the area is the prominent Bethany Baptist Church sited along the banks of the river. Also further south towards the town centre is Mill Street School (today Ysgol Gynradd Gymraeg Evan James).
