= The Cynon Valley Party =

Minor political party in the Cynon Valley, Wales

The Cynon Valley Party (Welsh: Plaid Cwm Cynon) was a political party formed in 2016 to campaign for people living in the Cynon Valley, including the towns of Aberdare and Mountain Ash, in Rhondda Cynon Taf, South Wales. The party won a council seat on Rhondda Cynon Taf County Borough Council in May 2017.

The Cynon Valley Party was founded in September 2016 by two Aberdare businessmen, Andrew Chainey and Graham Marsh. It was registered with the Electoral Commission on 13 September 2016. The party held its first meeting on 20 September, with membership open to anyone concerned about local issues affecting the Cynon Valley, regardless of their support of the wider policies of national parties. Initial concerns raised included local transport links, such as the proposed Northern Cross Valley Link and Southern Cross Valley Link road to Mountain Ash.

The party de-registered as a political party on 6 November 2020.

== Electoral performance ==
At the Rhondda Cynon Taf County Borough Council elections on 4 May 2017 The Cynon Valley Party fielded nine candidates, winning one of the seats for the Penrhiwceiber ward in a surprise result. New councillor Gavin Williams had ousted one of the veteran Labour councillors, Jane Ward, to take the seat.

Andrew Chainey of The Cynon Valley Party stood in the 2019 United Kingdom general election in the Cynon Valley constituency. He came fifth, with 4.4% of the vote, ahead of the Liberal Democrats.

Gavin Williams lost his seat on RCT County Borough Council in March 2021, due to not attending a council meeting for over 6 months. The council declared his seat vacant and a by-election was arranged to fill the vacancy.

The party did not stand any candidates in the 2022 Rhondda Cynon Taf County Borough Council election.
