= Thomastown, Rhondda Cynon Taf =

Coordinates: 51.575090°N 3.43762°W

Thomastown: Welsh: Tretomas
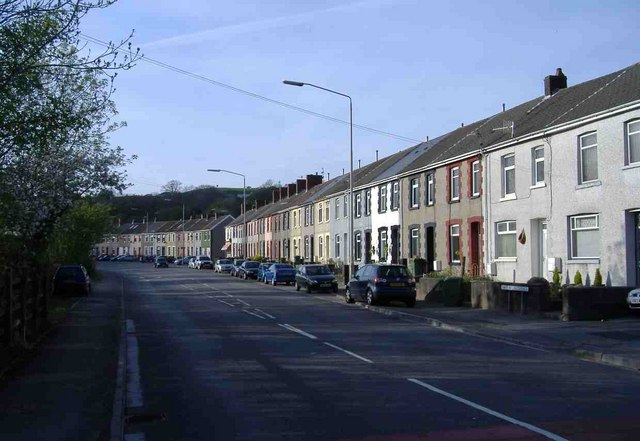

- Location within Rhondda Cynon Taf
- OS grid reference: ST 0047 8723
- Community: Tonyrefail
- Principal area: Rhondda Cynon Taf
- Preserved county: Mid Glamorgan
- Country: Wales
- Sovereign state: United Kingdom
- Post town: Porth
- Postcode district: CF39
- Dialling code: 01443
- Police: South Wales
- Fire: South Wales
- Ambulance: Welsh
- UK Parliament: Pontypridd

Thomastown (Welsh: Tretomas) is a village and district of the large community of Tonyrefail, within Rhondda Cynon Taf, South Wales. It is located to the south of Tonyrefail within the 'Tonyrefail West' electoral ward, and falls within the Ely Valley along the A4119.

Thomastown is also a community ward for elections to Tonyrefail & District Community Council.
