= Cefn Rhigos =

Coordinates: 51.7508°N 3.5728°W

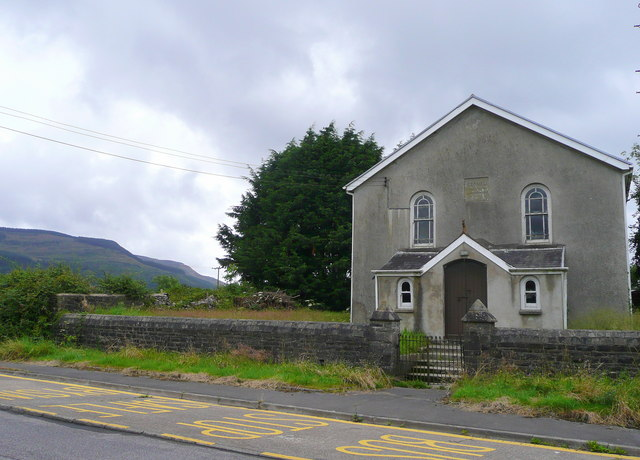
Bethel Chapel, Mount Road

Cefn Rhigos (English: '(the) ridge (at) Rhigos') is a hamlet to the west of the village of Rhigos, Rhondda Cynon Taf, Wales. Despite being 8 miles (13 km) from the town centre, it is within the Aberdare postal district.

It is the most westerly named settlement of the Cynon Valley. The border with the Vale of Neath lies a few hundred yards to the west.

Bethel Methodist chapel dates from 1860. With a plain architectural style, it has semi-circular arch windows and a central porch. It was originally built in 1839. The present structure was extended in 1905.
