= Ynysybwl and Coed-y-Cwm =

- Community
- Principal area: Rhondda Cynon Taf
- Country: Wales
- Sovereign state: United Kingdom
- Police: South Wales
- Fire: South Wales
- Ambulance: Welsh
- List of places UK Wales Rhondda Cynon Taf 51°38′54″N 3°22′50″W Map of the community

Ynysybwl and Coed-y-cwm (Welsh: Ynysbŵl a Choed-y-cwm) is a community in Rhondda Cynon Taf, Wales in the United Kingdom, comprising the villages of Ynysybwl and Coed-y-Cwm.

The community is governed by a community council.
