= Danny Grehan =

Welsh actor and politician

Member of Rhondda Cynon Taf County Borough Council for Tonyrefail East
- Incumbent
- Assumed office 5 May 2017

Personal details
- Born: November 1965 (age 60)
- Party: Plaid Cymru
- Occupation: Actor; politician

Danny Grehan (born November 1965) is a Welsh actor and politician who has served as Member of Rhondda Cynon Taf County Borough Council for Tonyrefail East since May 2017. He has portrayed many characters on Welsh stages and television since the 1980s. He received his education at the Royal Welsh College of Music & Drama.

== Career ==
Grehan has lived in Tonyrefail since the 1980s with his wife Helen Prosser and his family; their son is the noted Welsh-language poet Gwynfor Dafydd. In addition to his work as an actor, Grehan is a political worker for Plaid Cymru, and worked for Leanne Wood in the Rhondda. He is involved with the Welsh Language Society and is Community Engagement Officer for Plaid Cymru MS Heledd Fychan.

Grehan played Tony Morgan in the S4C/BBC soap opera Pobol y Cwm from 1994 to 1996. One of his most notable stage performances was in the first production of Meic Povey's controversial Welsh-language play, Wyneb a Wyneb (Face to Face) in 1993.

Grehan has represented Tonyrefail East on Rhondda Cynon Taf County Borough Council since 5 May 2017. He stood as a Plaid Cymru candidate for Afan Ogwr Rhondda for the 2026 Senedd election.

=== Theatre ===
- Aladdin - Imagine Theatre
- Harri'r VII - Mewn Cymeriad
- A Christmas Carol - Lighthouse Theatre
- The Good, Bad & Welsh - Frapetsus
- Return Journey - Lighthouse Theatre
- I’ll be there Now in a Minute - Frapetsus
- Sleeping Beauty - Imagine Theatre
- Guto Nyth Brân - Arad Goch
- Cinderella - Imagine Theatre
- Tylwyth - Theatr Genedlaethol Cymru
- Llwyth (2011/12) - Theatr Genedlaethol Cymru
- Aladdin - Martyn Geraint
- Llwyth - Sherman Cymru
- Beauty and the Beast - Imagine Theatre
- The Thorn Birds (2013) - Wales Theatre Company
- Romeo and Juliet - Wales Theatre Company
- My Fair Lady - Wales Theatre Company
- The Hired Man - Torch Theatre
- Contender - Wales Theatre Company
- A Child’s Christmas in Wales - Wales Theatre Company
- Amazing Grace - Wales Theatre Company
- Hamlet - Wales Theatre Company
- Calon Ci (1994) - Dalier Sylw
- Wyneb yn Wyneb (1990) - Dalier Sylw
- Hunllef Yng Nghymru Fydd - Dalier Sylw
- Y Gosb Ddi-Ddial - Cwmni Theatr Gwynedd
- Y Gelli Geirios - Cwmni Theatr Gwynedd
- Enoc Huws (1989) - Cwmni Theatr Gwynedd
- Croesi’r Bont - Theatr Powys
- Hualau - Cwmni Theatr Hwyl a Fflag
- Codi Stêm - Cwmni Theatr Hwyl a Fflag

=== Television and film ===
- Rain - Tornado Films
- Cymer dy Siâr - Gaucho
- Yr Alltud - Bryngwyn
- Milwr Bychan - Cine Cymru
- Alys - Apollo
- Pobol y Cwm - BBC
- Teulu - Boomerang
- Y Pris - Fiction Factory
- Casualty - BBC
- Cowbois ac Injans - Opus
- Pentre Bach (2 & 3) - Sianco
- Belonging - BBC
- A470 - ITV
- Jara - HTV
- The Bench - BBC
- Iechyd Da (2,3,4) - Bracan
- Y Meicrosgôp Hud - Elidir
- Perthyn - Bracan
- Wyneb yn Wyneb - Bracan
- Fi Sy’n Magu’r Babi - Bracan
- Pobol Y Cwm - BBC
- Cwlwm Serch - Llifon
- Môrladron - Psycho. News
- Dim Cliw - Telesgôp
- Mae Gen i Achos - Map
- Glan Hafren - HTV
- Mwy na Phapur Newydd - Lluniau Lliw
- Tu Hwnt i’r Lloer - Grasshopper Productions
