= Newtown, Rhondda Cynon Taf =

Coordinates: 51.677325°N 3.3677140°W

Newtown
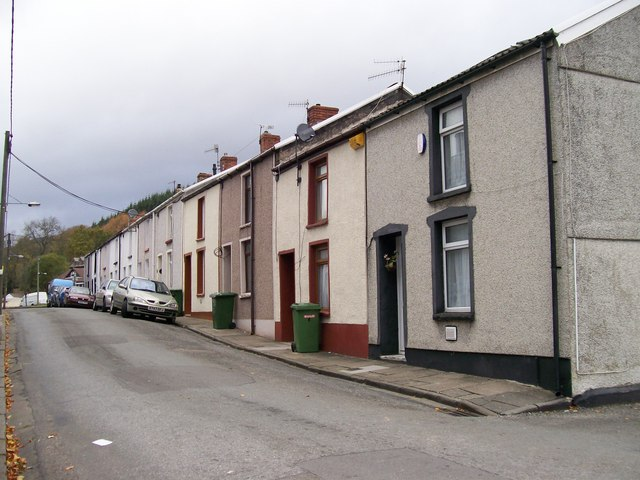

- Location within Rhondda Cynon Taf
- OS grid reference: ST 0553 9850
- Principal area: Rhondda Cynon Taf
- Preserved county: Mid Glamorgan
- Country: Wales
- Sovereign state: United Kingdom
- Post town: MOUNTAIN ASH
- Postcode district: CF45
- Dialling code: 01443
- Police: South Wales
- Fire: South Wales
- Ambulance: Welsh
- UK Parliament: Cynon Valley
- Senedd Cymru – Welsh Parliament: Cynon Valley

Newtown is a village and district of the town of Mountain Ash, within the Cynon Valley in Rhondda Cynon Taf, Wales.

== Geography ==
The village is located to the east of Mountain Ash town centre, bounded by the River Cynon to the west, and the large village of Caegarw to the north.

== Gallery ==
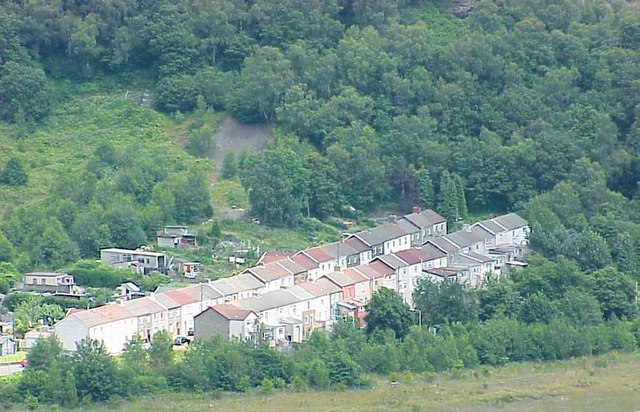

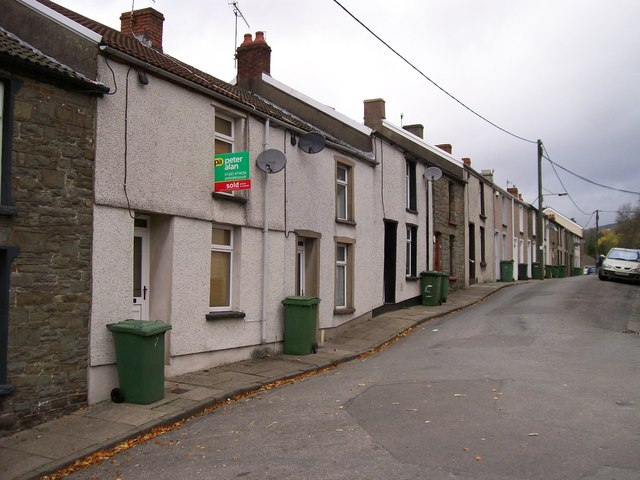
