= Pauline Jarman =

Welsh politician

Member of the Welsh Assembly for South Wales Central
- In office 6 May 1999 – 1 May 2003
- Preceded by: New Assembly
- Succeeded by: Leanne Wood

Leader of Rhondda Cynon Taff Council
- In office 1999–2004
- Succeeded by: Russell Roberts

Personal details
- Born: 15 December 1945 (age 80) Mountain Ash, Wales
- Party: Plaid Cymru

Pauline Jarman (born 15 December 1945) is a Welsh politician. She was the Plaid Cymru National Assembly for Wales Member for South Wales Central from 1999 to 2003 as well as being leader of Rhondda Cynon Taff Council from 1999 to 2004.

Educated at Mountain Ash Grammar School, she is a former Cynon Valley Borough Councillor and Mid Glamorgan County Councillor. Rhondda Cynon Taff Council Opposition Leader until 2022. Jarman is a former Mayor.

Jarman lost her seat on the council in May 2022, as a result of changes to ward boundaries which meant her former ward of Mountain Ash East has been merged. She had been a councillor for 46 years. After the result was announced for the new Mountain Ash ward, Jarman pledged to "wallow in the luxury of my family now" and also finish a book she had been writing.

== Offices held ==
Senedd
Preceded by (new post)	Assembly Member for South Wales Central; 1999 – 2003	Succeeded by Leanne Wood
