= 2022 Rhondda Cynon Taf County Borough Council election =

2022 Welsh local government election

2022 Rhondda Cynon Taf Council election
- 5 May 2022

All 75 seats to Rhondda Cynon Taf County Borough Council 38 seats needed for a majority

	First party	Second party
Party	Labour	Plaid Cymru
Seats won	59	8
Seat change	▲12	▼10
	Third party	Fourth party
Party	Independent	Conservative
Seats won	6	2
Seat change	▲1	▼2

The 2022 Rhondda Cynon Taf County Borough election took place on 5 May 2022 to elect 75 members across 46 wards to Rhondda Cynon Taf County Borough Council. On the same day, elections were held to the other 21 local authorities and to community councils in Wales as part of the 2022 Welsh local elections. The previous Rhondda Cynon Taf all-council election took place in 2017 and future elections will take place every five years.

== Ward results ==
Statements of persons nominated were published on 6 April. Results were announced and votes were counted on 6 May 2022. Incumbent councillors are marked with an asterisk (*).

=== Aberaman ===
Aberaman (3 seats)
Party	Candidate	Votes	%	±%
Labour	Julie Cook	1,518	64.3	
Labour	Tina Williams	1,472	62.3	
Labour	Sheryl Evans	1,447	61.3	
Plaid Cymru	Julie Williams	870	36.8	
Conservative	Andrew Clarke	320	13.5	
Turnout		2,362		

=== Abercynon ===
Abercynon (2 seats)
Party	Candidate	Votes	%	±%
Labour	Rhys Lewis	918	70.6	
Labour	Marcia Rees-Jones	851	65.4	
Plaid Cymru	Matt Skinner	234	18.0	
Propel	Vicky Jenkins	192	14.8	
Conservative	Craig Ford	154	11.8	
Turnout		1,301		

=== Aberdare East ===
Aberdare East (2 seats)
Party	Candidate	Votes	%	±%
Labour	Steve Bradwick	1,147	68.7	
Labour	Victoria Dunn	1,000	59.9	
Plaid Cymru	Geraint Benny	444	26.6	
Conservative	Andrew Abraham	231	13.8	
Turnout		1,669		

=== Aberdare West & Llwydcoed ===
Aberdare West & Llwydcoed (3 seats)
Party	Candidate	Votes	%	±%
Labour	Ann Crimmings	1,667	67.7	
Labour	Gareth Jones	1,435	58.3	
Labour	Sharon Rees	1,413	57.4	
Plaid Cymru	Elaine Owen	690	28.0	
Conservative	Davy Barton	519	21.1	
Turnout		2,463		

=== Beddau & Tyn-y-Nant ===
Beddau & Tyn-y-Nant (2 seats)
Party	Candidate	Votes	%	±%
Labour	Julie Barton	1,168	73.9	
Labour	Ricky Yeo	900	56.9	
Plaid Cymru	Rhys Gronow	277	17.5	
Conservative	Paul Thomas	257	16.3	
Conservative	Stephanie Trask	257	16.3	
Turnout		1,581		

=== Brynna and Llanharan ===
Brynna and Llanharan (3 seats)
Party	Candidate	Votes	%	±%
Independent	David Evans	1,105	49.9	
Labour	Geraint Hopkins	1,011	45.7	
Labour	Janine Turner	965	43.6	
Plaid Cymru	Helen Jane Donnan	616	27.8	
Conservative	Parmindra Pannu	297	13.4	
Liberal Democrats	Lee Nigel Thacker	219	9.9	
Britain First	Carl Burgess	191	8.6	
Turnout		2,213		

=== Church Village ===
Church Village (2 seats)
Party	Candidate	Votes	%	±%
Labour	Graham Stacey	807	46.9	
Labour	Lesley Gaynor Warren	720	41.9	
Plaid Cymru	Emma Thompson	459	26.7	
Plaid Cymru	Ioan Rhys Bellin	396	23.0	
Independent	Sally Gillard	413	24.0	
Conservative	Simon Schofield	345	20.1	
Turnout		1,719		

=== Cilfynydd ===
Cilfynydd (1 seat)
Party	Candidate	Votes	%	±%
Plaid Cymru	Hywel Gronow	354	41.2	
Labour	Barrie Morgan	306	35.6	
Independent	Stephen Belzak	134	15.6	
Independent	Stephen Powell	65	7.6	
Turnout		859		

=== Cwm Clydach ===
Cwm Clydach (1 seat)
Party	Candidate	Votes	%	±%
Labour	Mark Alan Norris	424	67.8	
Plaid Cymru	Kyle William Robert Luckwell	201	32.2	
Turnout		625		

=== Cwmbach ===
Cwmbach (2 seats)
Party	Candidate	Votes	%	±%
Labour	Jeffrey Alan Elliott	663	54.9	
Labour	Mustapha Maohoub	513	42.5	
Plaid Cymru	Dot Jones	375	31.1	
Independent	Kevin Jeremy Waddingham	371	30.7	
Green	John Matthews	177	14.7	
Turnout		1,207		

=== Cymer ===
Cymer (2 seats)
Party	Candidate	Votes	%	±%
Labour	Gareth Caple	995	72.8	
Labour	Ryan Evens	836	61.2	
Plaid Cymru	Nicole Griffiths	385	28.2	
Plaid Cymru	Owen George Cutler	314	23.0	
Turnout		1,366		

=== Ferndale & Maerdy ===
Ferndale & Maerdy (2 seats)
Party	Candidate	Votes	%	±%
Labour	Susan Morgans	1,368	62.4	
Labour	Jayne Smith	878	40.0	
Independent	Phil Howe	820	37.4	
Conservative	Lloyd Griffiths	127	5.8	
Liberal Democrats	Robert Butler	80	3.6	
Turnout		2,193		

=== Gilfach-Goch ===
Gilfach-Goch (1 seat)
Party	Candidate	Votes	%	±%
Labour	Aurfron Roberts	734	92.2	
Conservative	Pauline Price	62	7.8	
Turnout		796		

=== Glyn-Coch ===
Glyn-Coch (1 seat)
Party	Candidate	Votes	%	±%
Labour	Doug Williams	291	67.2	
Plaid Cymru	Daniel Anthony Baish	71	16.4	
Gwlad	Aled Maughan	71	16.4	
Turnout		433		

=== Graig & Pontypridd West ===
Graig & Pontypridd West (2 seats)
Party	Candidate	Votes	%	±%
Labour	Jayne Brencher	921	55.3	
Labour	Tina Leyshon	896	53.8	
Plaid Cymru	Richard Michael Reast	439	26.4	
Plaid Cymru	Alaw Griffiths	354	21.2	
Independent	Ashley Lloyd Evans	207	12.4	
Conservative	Beth Price	176	10.6	
TUSC	Mariam Victoria Kamish	38	2.3	
Turnout		1,666		

=== Hawthorn & Lower Rhydfelen ===
Hawthorn & Lower Rhydfelen (1 seat)
Party	Candidate	Votes	%	±%
Independent	Cathy Lisles	503	63.2	
Labour	Carl Andrew Thomas	293	36.8	
Turnout		796		

=== Hirwaun, Penderyn and Rhigos ===
Hirwaun, Penderyn and Rhigos (2 seats)
Party	Candidate	Votes	%	±%
Plaid Cymru	Karen Morgan	1,012	62.0	
Plaid Cymru	Adam Owain Rogers	811	49.7	
Labour	Rhian Grundy	471	28.9	
Labour	Richard Jones	464	28.4	
Conservative	Tara Robinson	164	10.1	
Turnout		1,631		

=== Llanharry ===
Llanharry (1 seat)
Party	Candidate	Votes	%	±%
Labour	Barry Stephens	401	46.1	
Independent	Sian Assiratti	296	34.0	
Plaid Cymru	Lindsay Hugh Doyle	76	8.7	
Conservative	Chris Oakes	60	6.9	
Independent	Paul Beach	23	2.6	
Independent	Paula Beach	14	1.6	
Turnout		870		

=== Llantrisant & Talbot Green ===
Llantrisant & Talbot Green (2 seats)
Party	Candidate	Votes	%	±%
Labour	Glynne Holmes	927	39.3	
Labour	Sarah Jane Davies	882	37.4	
Independent	Kate Libby Jones	800	33.9	
Conservative	Adam Joseph Leo Robinson	619	26.2	
Independent	Paul Baccara	498	21.1	
Plaid Cymru	Dafydd Rhys Roberts	445	18.8	
Turnout		2,361		

=== Llantwit Fardre ===
Llantwit Fardre (2 seats)
Party	Candidate	Votes	%	±%
Conservative	Sam Trask	966	47.7	
Conservative	Karl Johnson	944	46.6	
Labour	Mal Davies	687	33.9	
Labour	Rob McCracken	658	32.5	
Plaid Cymru	Haydn Owen	321	15.8	
Plaid Cymru	Scott Bevan	314	15.5	
Turnout		2,026		

=== Llwyn-y-Pia ===
Llwyn-y-Pia (1 seat)
Party	Candidate	Votes	%	±%
Labour	Wendy Lewis	534	67.6	
Plaid Cymru	Cerys Walker	152	19.2	
Propel	Jeffrey Gregory	104	13.2	
Turnout		790		

=== Mountain Ash ===
Mountain Ash (2 seats)
Party	Candidate	Votes	%	±%
Labour	Andrew Morgan	1,547	73.6	
Labour	Elizabeth Wendy Treeby	1,016	48.3	
Plaid Cymru	Pauline Jarman	897	42.7	
Conservative	Kurt Thomson	168	8.0	
TUSC	Mia Hollsing	107	5.1	
Turnout		2,102		

Jarman had been a councillor for 46 years, but lost her seat at this electio, partly as a result of the ward boundary changes.

=== Penrhiw-Ceibr ===
Penrhiw-ceibr (2 seats)
Party	Candidate	Votes	%	±%
Labour	Ross Williams*	960	77.6	
Labour	Adam Fox*	934	75.5	
Plaid Cymru	Lea Michael Dempsey	255	20.6	
Turnout		1,237		

=== Pentre ===
Pentre (2 seats)
Party	Candidate	Votes	%	±%
Labour	Georgina Elizabeth Williams	870	55.8	
Labour	Norman Howell Morgan	822	52.8	
Plaid Cymru	Geoff Rees	589	37.8	
Plaid Cymru	Lucy Purrington	509	32.7	
Conservative	Rob Green	113	7.3	
Turnout		1,558		

=== Pen-y-Graig ===
Pen-y-Graig (2 seats)
Party	Candidate	Votes	%	±%
Labour	Lisa Ellis	660	53.8	
Labour	Craig Middle	638	52.0	
Plaid Cymru	Joshua Rhys Davies	357	29.1	
Plaid Cymru	Christine Margaret Karadeniz	258	21.0	
Independent	Shawn Anthony Stevens	109	8.9	
Conservative	Jerry Cobb	79	6.4	
Turnout		1,227		

=== Pen-y-Waun ===
Pen-y-Waun (1 seat)
Party	Candidate	Votes	%	±%
Labour	Louisa Addiscott	391	77.3	
Plaid Cymru	Laura Anne Owen	63	12.5	
Conservative	James Daniel	52	10.3	
Turnout		506		

=== Pontyclun Central ===
Pontyclun Central (1 seat)
Party	Candidate	Votes	%	±%
Labour	Martin Douglas Ashford	346	31.1	
Conservative	Jamie Ethan Daniel	331	29.7	
Independent	Susan Owen	300	27.0	
Plaid Cymru	James Williams	108	9.7	
Liberal Democrats	Jade Smith	28	2.5	
Turnout		1,113		

=== Pontyclun East ===
Pontyclun East (1 seat)
Party	Candidate	Votes	%	±%
Independent	Paul Binning	240	23.8	
Conservative	Lewis Hooper	239	23.7	
Liberal Democrats	Steven Rajam	212	21.0	
Labour	Lewis Matthew	177	17.5	
Plaid Cymru	Ann Carole Willis	141	14.0	
Turnout		1,009		

=== Pontyclun West ===
Pontyclun West (1 seat)
Party	Candidate	Votes	%	±%
Independent	Wayne Owen	727	58.2	
Labour	David Lloyd Francis	299	23.9	
Conservative	Stefania Milani	182	14.6	
Liberal Democrats	David Richard Payne	41	3.3	
Turnout		1,249		

=== Pontypridd Town ===
Pontypridd Town (1 seat)
Party	Candidate	Votes	%	±%
Plaid Cymru	Dawn Susan Wood	565	53.9	
Labour	Steve Carter	380	36.2	
Conservative	Cheryl Lavington	104	9.9	
Turnout		1,049		

=== Porth ===
Porth (2 seats)
Party	Candidate	Votes	%	±%
Labour	Sarah Hickman	835	49.9	
Labour	Ros Davis	791	47.2	
Plaid Cymru	Julie Williams	706	42.1	
Plaid Cymru	Alun Cox	661	39.5	
Green	Rachel Pedley	71	4.2	
Propel	Melanie Hill	49	2.9	
Turnout		1,675		

=== Rhydfelen Central ===
Rhydfelen Central (1 seat)
Party	Candidate	Votes	%	±%
Labour	Maureen Webber	450	76.4	
Plaid Cymru	Brooke Webb	139	23.6	
Turnout		589		

=== Taff’s Well ===
Taff's Well (1 seat)
Party	Candidate	Votes	%	±%
Labour	Jill Bonetto	604	56.5	
Plaid Cymru	Christopher Edwards	329	30.1	
Conservative	Joyce Burbidge	135	12.6	
Turnout		1,068		

=== Ton-Teg ===
Ton-Teg (1 seat)
Party	Candidate	Votes	%	±%
Labour	Cai Preedy	445	39.1	
Independent	Clive Johnson	439	38.6	
Conservative	Lauren Bowen	253	22.3	
Turnout		1,137		

=== Tonypandy ===
Tonypandy (1 seat)
Party	Candidate	Votes	%	±%
Labour	Gareth Hughes	618	64.3	
Plaid Cymru	Wendy Allsop	280	29.1	
Conservative	Dan Jones	37	3.9	
Independent	Kevin Thomas	26	2.7	
Turnout		961		

=== Tonyrefail East ===
Tonyrefail East (2 seats)
Party	Candidate	Votes	%	±%
Plaid Cymru	Danny Grehan	870	53.7	
Labour	Dan Owen-Jones	838	51.7	
Labour	Linda Michel	667	41.1	
Plaid Cymru	Geraint Day	346	21.3	
Conservative	Natalie Bowen	139	8.6	
Turnout		1,621		

=== Tonyrefail West ===
Tonyrefail West (2 seats)
Party	Candidate	Votes	%	±%
Labour	Dawn Parkin	773	50.7	
Labour	Karen Webb	650	42.7	
Independent	Martin Barron	371	24.3	
Plaid Cymru	Richard Grabham	368	24.1	
Plaid Cymru	Matthew Enticott	304	19.9	
Conservative	Emyr Wilkinson	119	7.8	
Liberal Democrats	Gerald Francis	77	5.1	
Turnout		1,524		

=== Trallwng ===
Trallwng (1 seat)
Party	Candidate	Votes	%	±%
Independent	Mike Powell	646	51.2	
Labour	Ann Davies	468	37.1	
Plaid Cymru	Kevin Harry	112	8.9	
Conservative	Adam Porter	36	2.9	
Turnout		1,262		

=== Trealaw ===
Trealaw (1 seat)
Party	Candidate	Votes	%	±%
Labour	Wyn Hughes	805	80.1	
Plaid Cymru	Kevin Harry	200	19.9	
Turnout		1,005		

=== Treforest ===
Treforest (1 seat)
Party	Candidate	Votes	%	±%
Labour	Steve Powderhill	405	67.3	
Plaid Cymru	Richard Martin	95	15.8	
Conservative	Norma Edwards	58	9.6	
Green	Jeffrey Baxter	43	7.1	
Turnout		601		

=== Treherbert ===
Treherbert (2 seats)
Party	Candidate	Votes	%	±%
Independent	Will Jones	1,148	59.5	
Labour	Scott Emanuel	1,029	53.3	
Labour	Celia Villa-Landa	422	21.9	
Plaid Cymru	Percy Jones	405	21.0	
Plaid Cymru	Trish Denning	251	13.0	
Turnout		1,930		

=== Treorchy ===
Treorchy (2 seats)
Party	Candidate	Votes	%	±%
Labour	Bob Harris	1,407	57.6	
Plaid Cymru	Sera Evans*	1,004	41.1	
Plaid Cymru	Emyr Webster*	998	40.9	
Labour	James Watt-Rees	978	40.0	
Conservative	Huw Padgett	139	5.7	
Turnout		2,442		

=== Tylorstown & Ynyshir ===
Tylorstown & Ynyshir (2 seats)
Party	Candidate	Votes	%	±%
Labour	Julie Edwards	1,254	69.9	
Labour	Rob Bevan	1,186	66.1	
Plaid Cymru	Philip Lewis	476	26.5	
Conservative	Merfyn Rea	151	8.4	
Turnout		1,794		

=== Upper Rhydfelen & Glyn-Taf ===
Upper Rhydfelen & Glyn-Taf (1 seat)
Party	Candidate	Votes	%	±%
Labour	Loretta Tomkinson	389	74.6	
Independent	Ellis Thomas	132	25.3	
Turnout		521		

=== Ynysybwl ===
Ynysybwl (2 seats)
Party	Candidate	Votes	%	±%
Plaid Cymru	Amanda Ellis	629	51.2	
Plaid Cymru	Tony Burnell	581	47.3	
Labour	Richard Flowerdew	392	31.9	
Labour	Mark Adams	372	30.3	
Gwlad	Clayton Jones	112	9.1	
Gwlad	Jessica O’Donovan	92	7.5	
Conservative	Andrew Williams-Jones	70	5.7	
Turnout		1,229		

=== Ystrad ===
Ystrad (2 seats)
Party	Candidate	Votes	%	±%
Labour	Emma Dunning	973	61.0	
Labour	Geraint Jones	865	54.2	
Plaid Cymru	Larraine Jones	663	41.5	
Plaid Cymru	Louise Evans	532	33.3	
Turnout		1,596		

== By-elections between 2022 and 2027 ==
=== Pontypridd Town (2025) ===
A by-election took place on 17 July 2025 following the resignation of Plaid Cymru councillor, Dawn Wood, on health grounds. The seat was held by Plaid Cymru.

Pontypridd Town 2025
Party	Candidate	Votes	%	±%
Plaid Cymru	Wiliam Jac Rees	540	51.6	−2.3
Reform	Martin William Roberts	253	24.2	N/A
Labour	Elin Mair Brown	203	19.4	−16.8
Conservative	Cerys Walker	27	2.6	−7.3
Green	Jeffrey Lee Baxter	23	2.2	N/A
Majority		287	27.4	N/A
Turnout		1,046	44.31	

=== Treorchy (2026) ===
A by-election took place on 25 June 2026 for one seat in Treorchy due to Sera Evans being elected to the Senedd. The seat was held by Plaid Cymru.

Treorchy 2026
Party	Candidate	Votes	%	±%
Plaid Cymru	Richard Clarke	1,147	70.8	+26.6
Reform	Craig Ford	260	16.0	N/A
Labour	David Morris	164	10.1	−42.7
Conservative	Cerys Walker	27	1.7	−1.4
Green	Daniel Buck	23	1.4	N/A
Majority		887	54.8	N/A
Turnout		1,620	27.66	

=== Llantwit Fardre (2026) ===
Llantwit Fardre by-election, 3rd September 2026
Party	Candidate	Votes	%	±%
Conservative	Joel James	1,043	57.6	+8.7
Plaid Cymru	Danny Crudge	329	18.2	+1.9
Reform	Lyndon Evans	240	13.3	N/A
Labour	Lloyd Watkins	188	10.4	−24.4
Independent	Jonathan Bishop	10	0.6	N/A
Majority		714	39.4	N/A
Turnout		1810	35.4	−4.2
Conservative hold		Swing		

=== Pentre (2026) ===
Pentre by-election, 15 December 2026
Party	Candidate	Votes	%	±%
Plaid Cymru	Larraine Jones			
Reform	Ioan Mathias			
Conservative	Cerys Walker			
Labour	James Watts-Rees			
Majority				
Turnout				
		Swing		
