= Cardiff Arms Park Male Choir =

Welsh choir

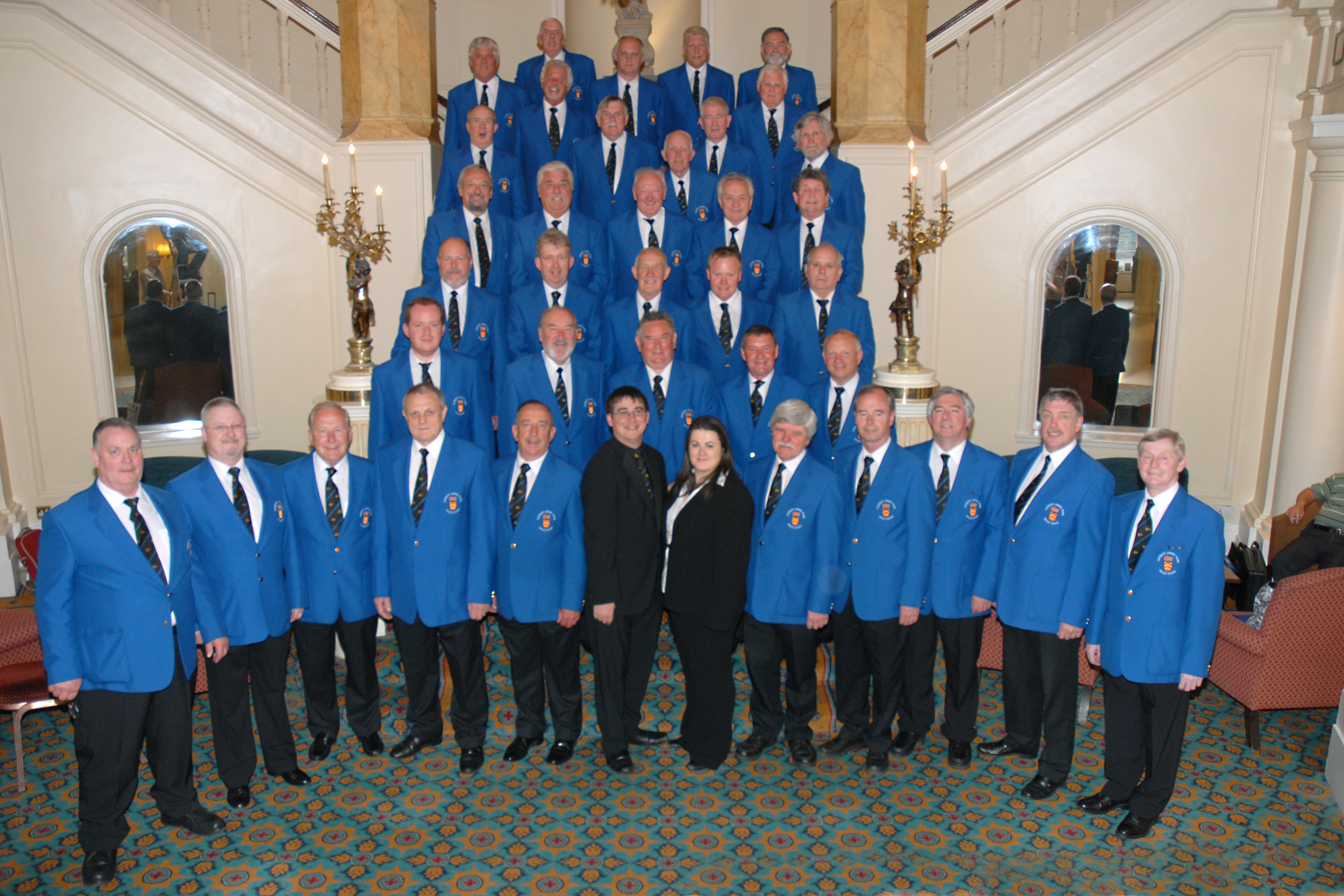
Cardiff Arms Park Male Choir

Cardiff Arms Park Male Choir is a Welsh Male choir based at Cardiff Arms Park in Cardiff, Wales, United Kingdom.

== History ==
On 1 September 1966, following Cardiff RFC's 35–0 defeat of Cardiff & District, a group of supporters came up with idea of forming a choir to improve the standard of after-match singing. The Cardiff Athletic Male Voice Choir first met on the following Monday, 5 September, in the old Skittle Alley at the Rugby Club. There were twenty-five members present for the first meeting. The choir changed its name in 2000 to become the Cardiff Arms Park Male Choir, helping to raise the profile of the choir and perpetuate the name of the Arms Park.

The choir made their first TV appearance within weeks of being formed, welcoming the Australian Rugby Team to Wales, and has since appeared on television on numerous occasions, including appearances on BBC, Sky Sports, ITV, Channel 4, New Zealand and Australian TV and MUTV. The choir sang live on Grandstand in 2002 and recorded an advertisement for the BBC's Six Nations rugby coverage alongside Goldie Lookin Chain in 2006. The choir were also filmed for an in-flight advertisement for Qantas airlines. They appeared on the Rogue Trader section of Watchdog, made a very brief appearance on Strictly Come Dancing and supported Ant & Dec in a link for Britain's Got Talent.

The choir has performed alongside numerous stars, including Hayley Westenra, Charlotte Church, Max Boyce, Peter Karrie, Shân Cothi, Goldie Lookin Chain and Foreigner.

The choir has travelled to Scotland (Blairgowrie in 1993, Perth and Crieff in 2009 and 2011), Ireland (Kilkenny in 1998), the Czech Republic (Prague, Plzeň and Karlštejn in 2004), France (Pleyben in 2004 Chatte in 2006 and [(Strasbourg)] in 2012), Switzerland (Le Brassus in 2006), Italy (Milan in 2006), Germany (Heilbronn, Satteldorf and Stuttgart in 2007), Poland (Kraków in 2009) and Spain (Santander in 2010). Some of the choir joined as guests of Dowlais Male Choir in their performances at the 2008 Festival Interceltique de Lorient.

In the UK, the choir has performed in a variety of venues, including nine appearances at the London Welsh Festivals of Male Choirs in the Royal Albert Hall, singing before Wales v Fiji in 2002 and Wales v South Africa in 2008 at the Millennium Stadium and numerous appearances at Cardiff Arms Park itself. The choir took part in the World Choir at the National Stadium in Cardiff in 1993.

In 2009 the choir sang at the opening of the new Cardiff library. The Manic Street Preachers opened the library, and the choir sang a specially arranged version of their song A Design for Life, which was described by bassist Nicky Wire as "spine-tingling".

The choir sang at the opening of the new John Lewis department store in Cardiff in September 2009 as well as recording their radio advertisement. The choir's involvement was included in a subsequent BBC documentary.

== Massed Choir Festivals ==
The choir celebrated its fortieth anniversary in 2006 with a number of events, including a dinner at the Arms Park and a European tour. The main event was a massed male concert at St David's Hall, Cardiff on 17 June. The concert featured over 400 singers made up of choristers from Canoldir, Dowlais, Gwent, Kenfig Hill, Maesteg, Neath, Penybontfawr and Pontarddulais male choirs alongside the Cardiff choristers. They were accompanied by a 53-strong orchestra, and the guest artists were the Llanishen Fach Primary School choir and Hayley Westenra.

Following on from the success of the massed concert in 2006, the choir joined forces with Canoldir Male Choir (based in Birmingham) to create the AngloWelsh Festival of Male Choirs. The first concerts of the biennial festival took place in April/May 2009 in Symphony Hall, Birmingham and St David's Hall, Cardiff. Participating choirs were Cardiff Arms Park, Canoldir, Dowlais, Kenfig Hill, Kidderminster, Leigh Orpheus, Neath, Shrewsbury, Penybontfawr and Pontypridd male choirs. The guest artists were Les Chansonelles and John Garner in Birmingham, and Llanishen Fach Primary School choir and Shân Cothi in Cardiff.

The second AngloWelsh Festival of Male Choirs took place in St David's Hall, Cardiff on 10 September 2011. The massed choir was made up of Biddulph, Budleigh Salterton, Cardiff Arms Park, Canoldir, Cotswold, Dowlais, Mynyddislwyn, Newtown & District, Pontypridd, Shrewsbury, Tenby and Ynysowen male choirs. Guest artists were the Llanishen Fach Primary School choir and Gary Griffiths.

== Recordings ==
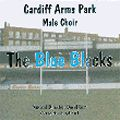
The Blue Blacks

=== The Blue Blacks ===
1. Sloop John B
2. Cwm Rhondda
3. Calon Lân
4. World in Union
5. Comrades in Arms
6. Sanctus
7. The Lord's Prayer
8. Oh Isis And Osiris
9. A Roman War Song
10. An American Trilogy
11. The Rose
12. Bring Him Home
13. Ivor Novello Medley
14. Steal Away
15. Let It Be Me
16. Take Me Home
17. Amen (This Little Light)
18. Sloop John B

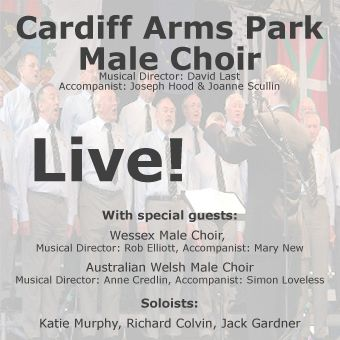
Live!

=== Live! ===
1. With A Voice of Singing
2. Let It Be Me
3. The Rhythm of Life
4. Soldiers' Chorus
5. Heaven Is My Home (with Australian Welsh Male Choir, Katie Murphy and Richard Colvin)
6. Amen (This Little Light)
7. There Is Nothin' Like A Dame (with Jack Gardiner)
8. The Rose
9. Bui Doi (with Richard Colvin)
10. My Lord, What A Morning (with Wessex Male Choir)
11. An American Trilogy (with Wessex Male Choir)
12. Mae Hen Wlad Fy Nhadau (with Australian Welsh Male Choir)

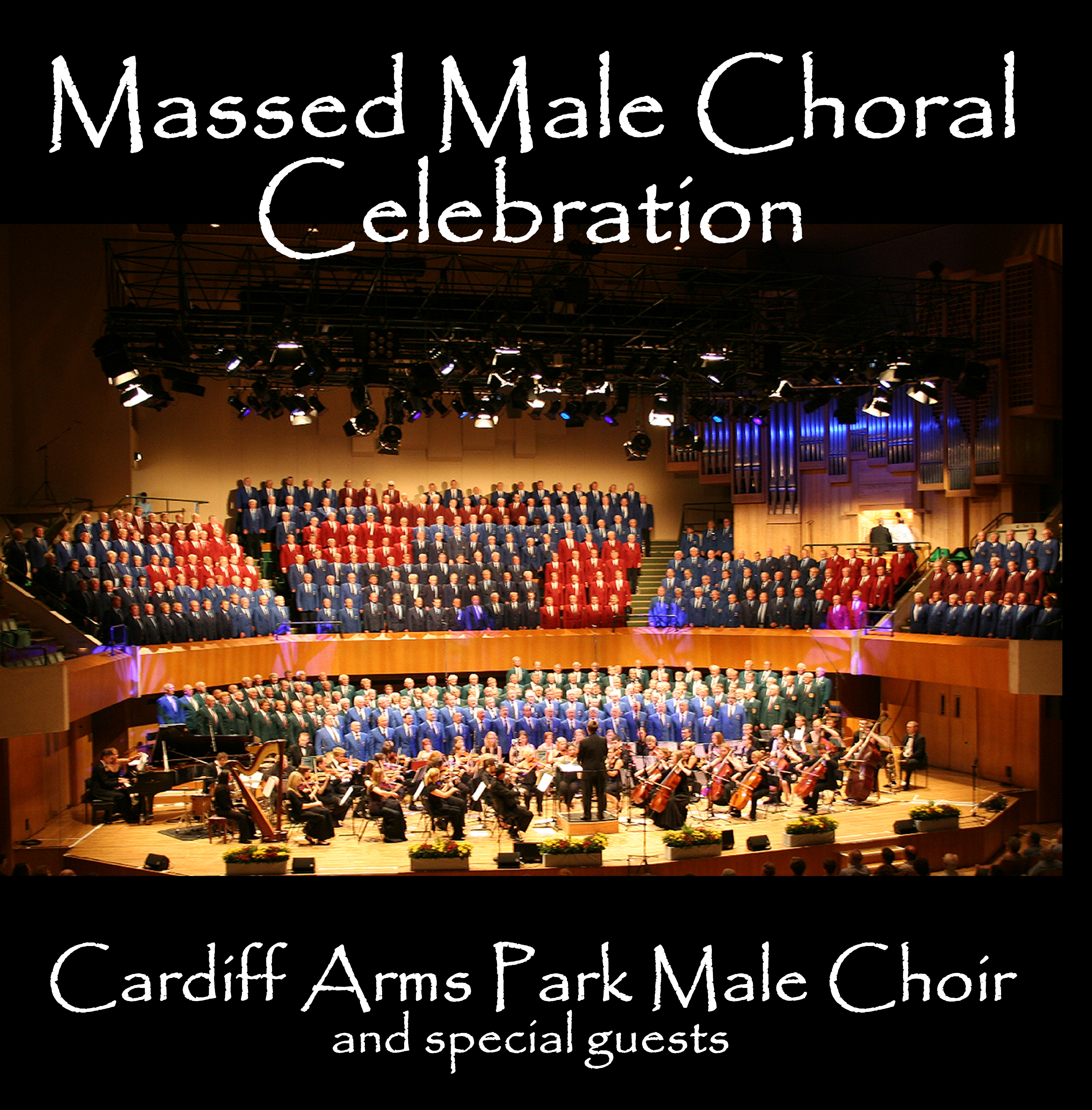
Massed Male Choral Celebration

=== Massed Male Choral Celebration ===
Recorded live at St David's Hall, Cardiff on 17 June 2006, featuring the massed voices of Cardiff Arms Park, Canoldir, Dowlais, Gwent, Kenfig Hill, Maesteg, Neath, Penybontfawr and Pontarddulais male choirs and a 53-strong orchestra.

1. Welsh Prelude [Orchestra]
2. This Is The Moment [Massed Choir]
3. Gwahoddiad [Massed Choir]
4. Men of Harlech [Massed Choir]
5. Consider Yourself [Llanishen Fach Primary School Choir]
6. My Friend [Llanishen Fach Primary School Choir]
7. Chorus of the Hebrew Slaves (Speed Your Journey) [Massed Choir]
8. Soldiers' Chorus [Massed Choir]
9. My Lord, What A Morning [Massed Choir]
10. An American Trilogy [Massed Choir]
11. Love in My Heart [Llanishen Fach Primary School Choir]
12. There's Me [Llanishen Fach Primary School Choir]
13. Finlandia [Massed Choir]
14. Deus Salutis (Llef) [Massed Choir]
15. Llanfair [Massed Choir]
16. Morte Criste [Massed Choir]
17. Whistle Down The Wind [Llanishen Fach Primary School Choir]
18. As One [Llanishen Fach Primary School Choir]
19. Nidaros [Massed Choir]
20. God Save The Queen [Massed Choir]
21. Hen Wlad Fy Nhadau [Massed Choir]

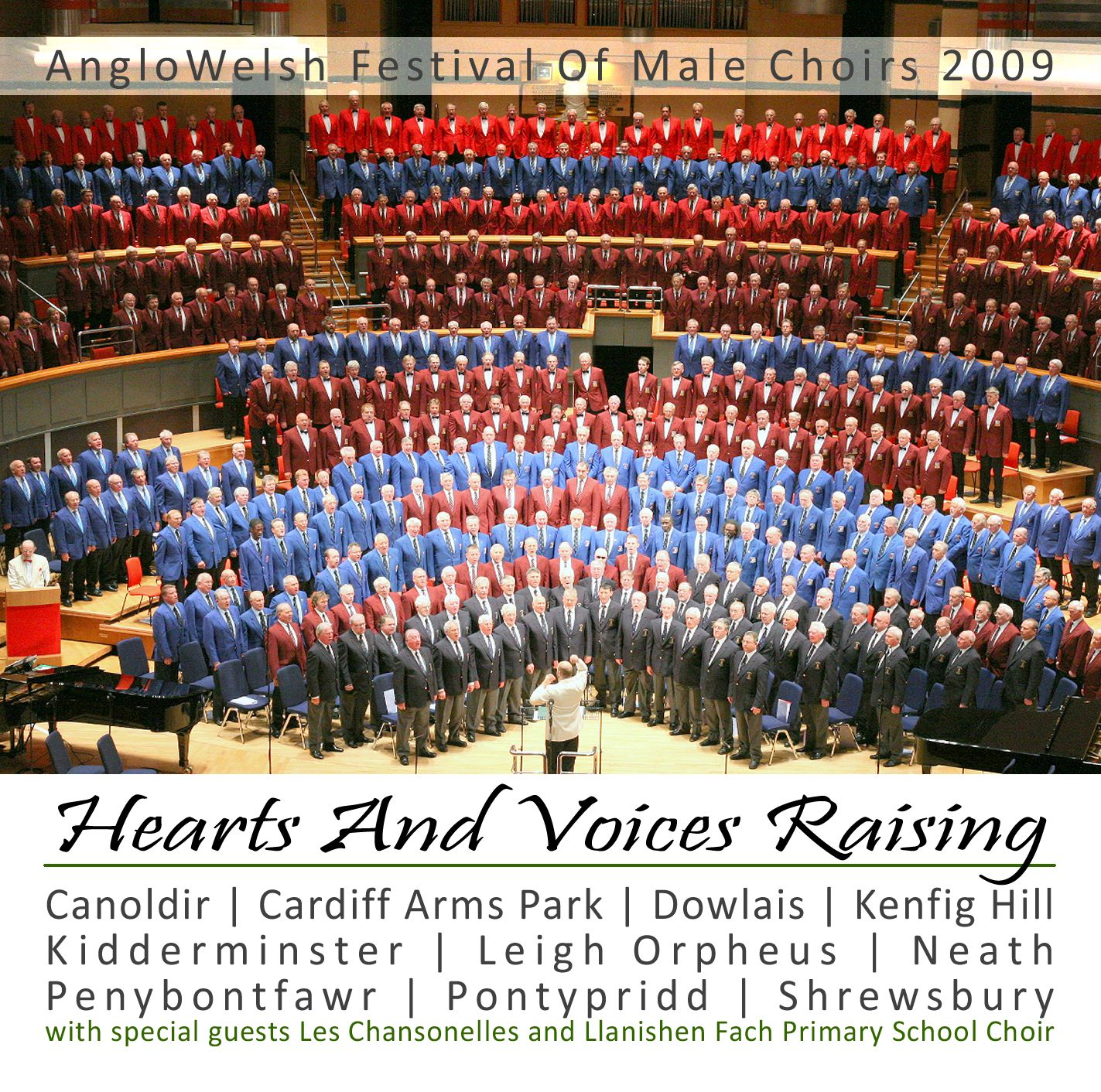
Hearts And Voices Raising

=== Hearts And Voices Raising ===
Recorded live at Symphony Hall, Birmingham and St David's Hall, Cardiff at the inaugural AngloWelsh Festival of Male Choirs, 2009, featuring the massed voices of Cardiff Arms Park, Canoldir, Dowlais, Kenfig Hill, Kidderminster, Leigh Orpheus, Neath, Shrewsbury, Penybontfawr and Pontypridd Male Choirs.

1. Christus Salvator [Massed Choir]
2. A Roman War Song [Massed Choir]
3. Morte Criste [Massed Choir]
4. Love, Shine A Light [Llanishen Fach Primary School Choir]
5. You Are My Brother [Llanishen Fach Primary School Choir]
6. Comrades in Arms [Massed Choir]
7. Hava Nagila [Massed Choir]
8. Dream A Little Dream of Me [Les Chansonelles]
9. The Rose/Hello My Friend [Les Chansonelles]
10. Autumn Leaves [Massed Choir]
11. Give Me That Old Time Religion [Massed Choir]
12. Blaenwern [Massed Choir and Audience]
13. Stand By Me [Llanishen Fach Primary School Choir]
14. I Wanna Sing Scat [Llanishen Fach Primary School Choir]
15. Trust [Llanishen Fach Primary School Choir]
16. Softly As I Leave You [Massed Choir]
17. The Rhythm of Life [Massed Choir]
18. Fields of Gold [Les Chansonelles]
19. Somebody To Love [Les Chansonelles]
20. Myfanwy [Massed Choir]
21. Tydi A Roddaist [Massed Choir]
22. An American Trilogy [Massed Choir and Les Chansonelles]

=== We Raise Our Voices High ===
Provisional title of the recording of the 2011 AngloWelsh Festival of Male Choirs, which took place on 10 September at St David's Hall, Cardiff.

== Musical Staff ==
Ieuan Jones is the current musical director of the choir, and David Last is the accompanist.

=== Musical Directors ===
- 1966–1982: John Davies
- 1982–1987: Bill Cooper
- 1987–1989: David N Jones
- 1989–1994: Mary Lloyd
- 1994–2001: Edgar Taylor
- 2001– 2016: David Last (Vice President)
- 2016–present: Ieuan Jones (Assistant Accompanist 2012-2016)

=== Accompanists ===
- 1966–1983: Justin Beynon
- 1983–1985: Dorothy Lewis
- 1985–1988: Marjorie Collier
- 1988–1989: David Huw Rees
- 1989–2002: Mary Jones
- 2002–2004: Joseph Hood
- 2004–2004: Kirsten Watson
- 2005–2017: Jo Scullin
- 2017–2020: Joseph Cavalli-Price
- 2020–present: David Last
