= Pontypridd (disambiguation) =

Pontypridd is a town in Wales, United Kingdom.

Pontypridd may also refer to:

- Pontypridd (Senedd constituency)
- Pontypridd (UK Parliament constituency)
- Pontypridd railway station
- Pontypridd RFC, a rugby union club based in Pontypridd, Wales

== See also ==
- Pontypridd, Caerphilly and Newport Railway
- Pontypridd Graig railway station
- Côr Meibion Pontypridd, a Welsh choir
