= Pontsionnorton =

Coordinates: 51.61652°N 3.32722°W

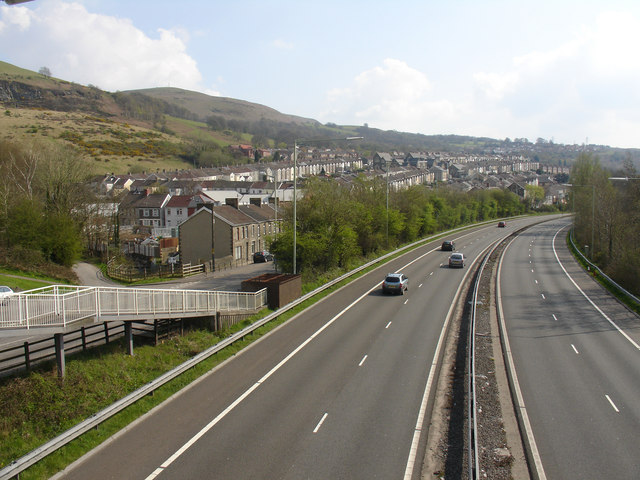

- Location within Rhondda Cynon Taf
- OS grid reference: ST083912
- Principal area: Rhondda Cynon Taf
- Preserved county: Mid Glamorgan
- Country: Wales
- Sovereign state: United Kingdom
- Post town: PONTYPRIDD
- Postcode district: CF37
- Dialling code: 01443
- Police: South Wales
- Fire: South Wales
- Ambulance: Welsh
- UK Parliament: Pontypridd
- Senedd Cymru – Welsh Parliament: Pontypridd

Pontsionnorton (Welsh: Pont Siôn Norton), meaning "Siôn (Shaun/John) Norton's Bridge" in Welsh, is so named because of a small bridge over the Glamorganshire Canal at this point. The village/district falls within the electoral ward of Cilfynydd of the larger town and community of Pontypridd in Rhondda Cynon Taf, South Wales, and overlooks the A470 as it travells towards Abercynon. The village falls within the historic parish of Eglwysilan is bounded by Cilfynydd, Coedpenmaen, Trallwn and Glyncoch, and was once location of Bodwenarth Colliery, located in Bodwenarth Woods close to the main school - Ysgol Gynradd Gymraeg Pont Siôn Norton.
