= Pontypridd Market and Town Hall =

Municipal Building in Pontypridd, Wales

- Marchnad a Neuadd y Dref Ponypridd (Welsh)
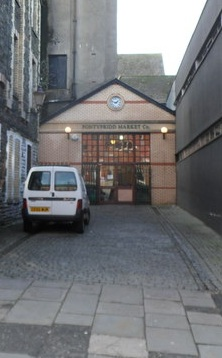
- The Market Street entrance to the complex in January 2012

- Shown in Rhondda Cynon Taf
- 51.6027°N 3.3409°W
- Location: Pontypridd

History
- Built: 1885

Site notes
- Architectural style: Mannerist style

Listed Building – Grade II
- Official name: Old Market Hall
- Designated: 17 July 1990
- Reference no.: 13523

Listed Building – Grade II
- Official name: The Arcade
- Designated: 26 February 2001
- Reference no.: 24896

Pontypridd Market and Town Hall (Welsh: Marchnad a Neuadd y Dref Ponypridd) is a historic building located on Market Street, Pontypridd in Rhondda Cynon Taf in Wales. The structure, which contains a large auditorium which is currently derelict, was built in two parts both of which are Grade II listed buildings.

== History ==
In the 1877, a group of local businessmen decided to form a company, to be known as the "Pontypridd Market and Town Hall Company", to finance and commission an indoor market and town hall for Pontypridd. The authority to proceed with this endeavour was contained in an act of parliament, "The Pontypridd Markets, Fairs and Town Hall Act 1877". The initial building was a narrow structure designed in the Mannerist style, built in rock-faced stone by William Seaton of Pontypridd at a cost of £1,600 and was completed in 1885.

In 1890, the complex was expanded by a new square-shaped building, to the immediate south of the original building, later known as "The Arcade". It was covered by a seven-bay roof. Inside, there was a new market hall on the ground floor and, above it, there was an auditorium which became known as "Pontypridd Town Hall". It provided seating for about 1,700 people. Speakers in the town hall included Winston Churchill, who visited Pontypridd in September 1905.

Fixed stalls were installed in the market in the 1910s, then the ground floor of the new building became its central hall. It was subsequently surrounded by buildings on all sides and so invisible from outside; entrance was by iron bridges. Two further market halls were added after the Second World War, and a salesroom was converted into a further hall in 1987, making it the largest indoor market in Wales. Meanwhile, Sir Harry Secombe and Sir Geraint Evans, supported by the Côr Meibion Pontypridd, performed in the auditorium, by then known as the "Town Hall Theatre", in November 1959. The town hall theatre closed in 1982.

In 2015, a group was formed with plans to restore and divide the theatre, to form two smaller theatres, a cinema, a cafe and a restaurant.

== Architecture ==
The theatre has rendered walls and a slate roof, with a large flytower. The hall is flat and has a balcony and a raised proscenium arch stage. The ceiling has deep coving and an Art Deco cornice.
