= Old Bridge, Pontypridd =

Grade I listed bridge in Pontypridd, UK

Old Bridge
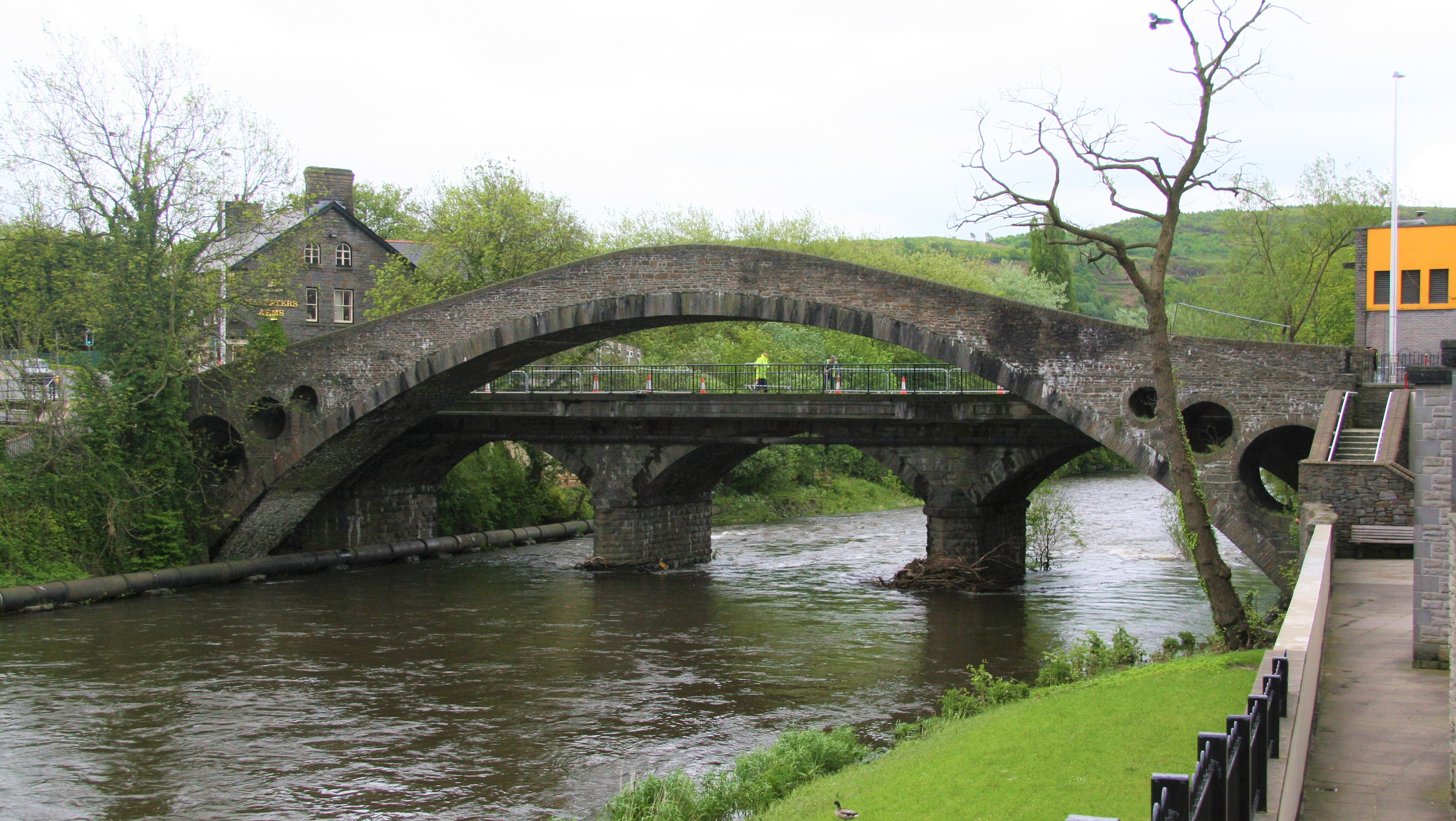
- Old Bridge (foreground); Victoria Bridge (background)
- Coordinates: 51°36′18″N 3°20′18″W
- Carried: foot traffic
- Crossed: River Taff
- Locale: Pontypridd, Wales
- Official name: William Edwards Bridge
- Maintained by: Rhondda Cynon Taf
- Heritage status: Scheduled monument

Characteristics
- Design: Arch bridge
- Width: 11 ft (3 m)
- Longest span: 140 feet (43 m)
- Clearance below: 34 ft (10 m)

History
- Designer: William Edwards
- Construction start: 1746
- Opened: 1756
- Collapsed: 1748

Statistics
- Toll: Free public access

Listed Building – Grade I
- Official name: Pontypridd Bridge
- Designated: 25 May 1962
- Reference no.: 13497

Scheduled monument
- Official name: Pontypridd Bridge
- Reference no.: GM015

Location
- Interactive map of Old Bridge

The Old Bridge (Welsh: Yr Hen Bont), which is now also known as the William Edwards Bridge or Pontypridd Bridge, and which was originally known as the New Bridge or Newbridge, is an arched single-span footbridge that spans the River Taff at Pontypridd in Wales. The bridge was built by William Edwards and was completed in 1756. The bridge now has statutory protection as a scheduled ancient monument and is grade I listed.

== Pontypridd ==
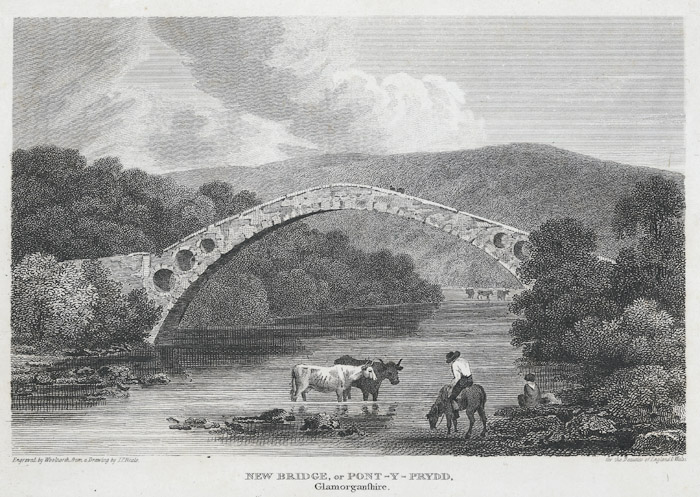
The bridge in 1813 when it was known as New Bridge or Pont-y-Prydd

In the early 18th century Pontypridd, then known as Pont-y-tŷ-pridd ('The bridge of the earthen house'), was a tiny hamlet. Pont-y-tŷ-pridd took its name from the original bridge of the same name. Possibly in 1744 or after the bridge was built, Pont-y-tŷ-pridd it also became known as Newbridge or New Bridge after the William Edwards Bridge. However, the travel-writer Henry Wyndham, who visited the bridge in 1774, calls it "Pont y Prîdd, or the new bridge".

An ancient ford with stepping stones ran alongside the current Old Bridge. It was used only when the river ran low; but little is known about this.

== Construction ==
=== The first bridge ===
In 1746 when William Edwards was just 27 years of age, he was commissioned by the Hundreds of Miskin and Caerphilly to build a three-arch bridge across the River Taff. For this he was paid £500, on condition that he would maintain it for seven years.

The first bridge to be constructed was a three-arch stone bridge, which was built in 1746. It was destroyed by a heavy storm which caused the River Taff to flood about two years later. A large amount of debris came down the river, which then become trapped against the two piers supporting the bridge. The weight and force of the debris ultimately destroyed the bridge, which was then swept away down the river.

=== The second bridge ===
After the destruction of the first bridge over the fast-flowing River Taff, Edwards designed a more radical 140 ft (43 m) single-arch bridge that would eliminate the possibility of debris destroying the bridge due to the flooding of the River Taff. The second bridge was built from 1748, however two reports differ as to what actually happened during this second attempt. Thomas Morgan, a contemporary of Edwards, said that "…when he (Edwards) had almost finished the arch, the centre timber work gave way and all fell to the bottom." However, The National Library of Wales has a contemporary work known as the Plasybrain manuscript which says, "Just after the first single arch was finished and before the centre was struck, a flood came and carried all away." It is not clear which account is accurate, although it is clear that the attempt failed.

=== The third bridge ===
The single-arch bridge was rebuilt and was completed. It stood for about six weeks before it failed again. The weight of the materials in the bridge was not balanced on either side of the keystone, which gradually forced the stone out of position as traffic on the bridge created small vibrations and movement, and the bridge collapsed. In the Theory of Arches and Pontypridd, it states that "the weight of the bridge was either too great on the haunches or too little on the crown." At this stage Edwards was either encouraged or forced to try again with extra money being provided to cover his losses for the earlier attempts.

=== The fourth bridge ===
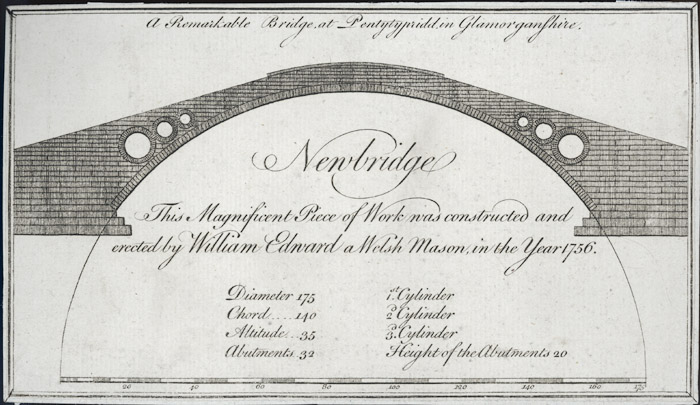
The Old Bridge, when it was known as Newbridge

The final design of the bridge included three cylindrical voids (holes) of 2.7 m (8.9 ft), 1.7 m (5.6 ft) and 1.1 m (3.6 ft) on each side on the bridge. This reduced the weight and pressure on the crown and the bridge is still in operation today, although it is now only used for foot traffic. The Theory of Arches and Pontypridd states that as a bridge for commerce, it was a failure, as it was "only eleven feet wide between the parapets and so steep that wagons had to use a 'chain and drag' to descend from the crown."

The 140 ft Old Bridge surpassed the 130 ft (40 m) Old Walton Bridge as the longest single-span bridge in Great Britain and remained the longest bridge for another 40 years. It was also one of the few bridges in Europe at the time, and indeed worldwide, whose span exceeded the 40 m mark.

The whole project (including the three failed attempts) cost Edwards a total of £1,153 18s. 2d. (approximately £1,153.91), and consequently his loss exceeded £600. It was reported that Edwards' attempts to build the bridge over the River Taff left him in considerable debt; Thomas Morgan reported that "…the mason was considerably in debt and greatly discouraged. But the Lords Talbot and Windsor, who have estates in the neighbourhood, pitied his case, and being willing to encourage such an enterprising genius, most generously promoted a subscription among the gentry in those parts."

== Subsequent history ==
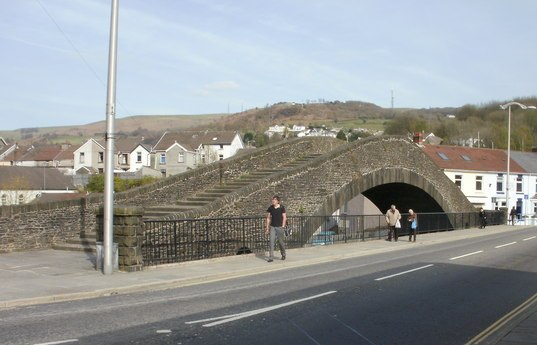
The Old Bridge with steps ascending the bridge

The Old Bridge was so steep that horse carts had difficulty crossing it. By 1857, a new bridge, the Victoria Bridge, was built next to the Old Bridge, which was paid for by the people of Pontypridd. The Victoria Bridge is a three-arch bridge, built by Thomas Jenkins, that did not have a problem with roadway steepness.

Since the bridge was opened in 1756, it has been the subject for many landscape artists, including Richard Wilson and Turner.

The Old Bridge is now a scheduled monument and is also depicted in emblems of local sport teams, including Pontypridd F.C. Pontypridd RFC and Cilfynydd RFC. Artist Lulu Quinn was commissioned by Rhondda Cynon Taf County Borough Council to illuminate the Old Bridge as part of a regeneration programme for Pontypridd called the Monument Illumination Scheme. Initial tests to illuminate the bridge took place on 19 August 2008, and the project was officially launched after successful testing.

== Bridge imagery ==
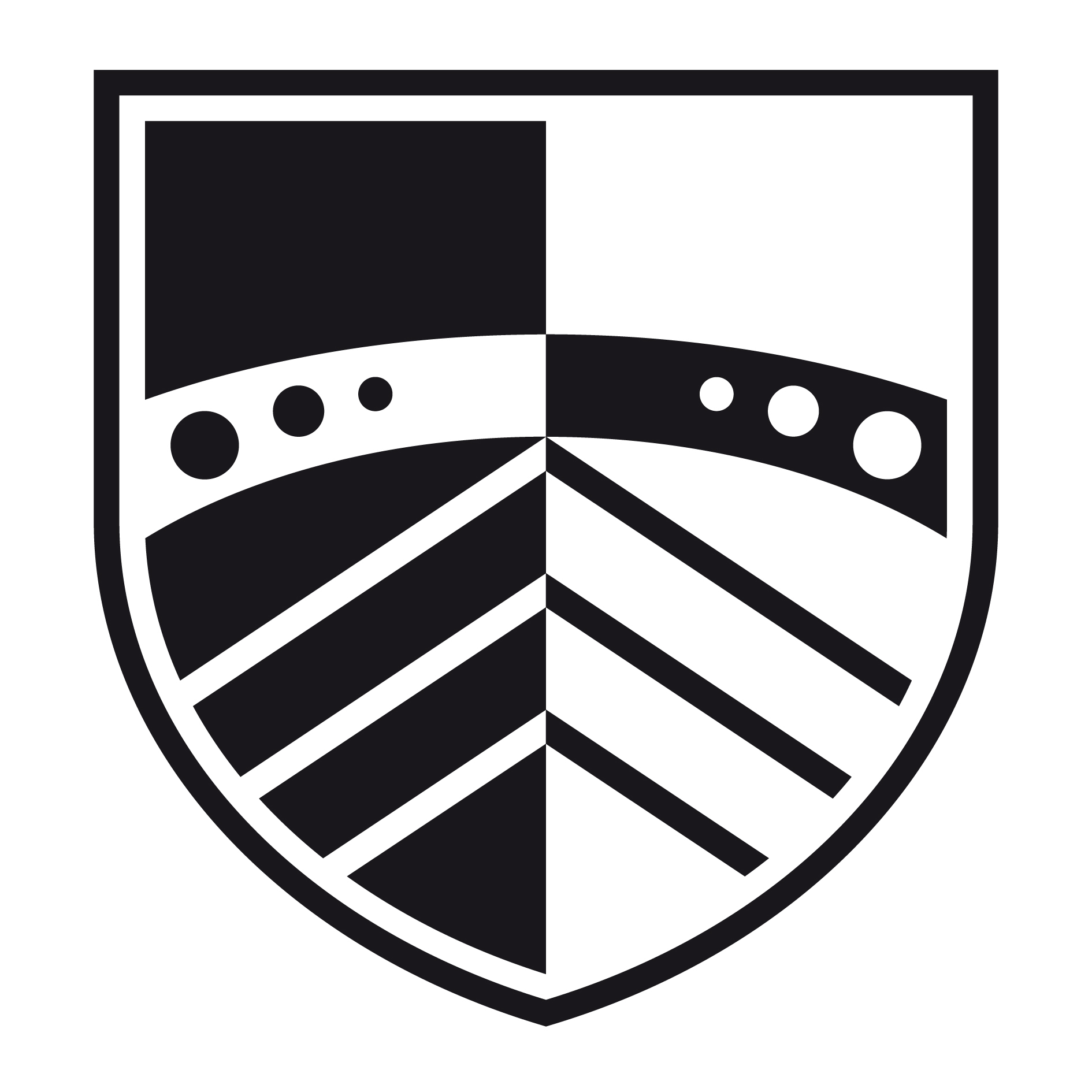
The crest of Pontypridd Rugby Football Club displays an image of the Old Bridge with its cylindrical voids (holes)

Representations of Old Bridge can be seen in local heraldic and civic stationery, including the crest of Pontypridd Rugby Football Club, Pontypridd Football Club and Cilfynydd Rugby Football Club. The community-to-community organisation PONT (Partnerships Overseas Networking Trust), also bases its logo upon the Bridge. Pontypridd High School in Cilfynydd incorporates the bridge design into the school shield, as does Pontypridd Town Council with its logo representing the South Wales Valleys and a section of the Old Bridge in the foreground. Pontypridd Male Voice Choir also incorporates the Old Bridge in the choir logo.

== See also ==
- List of bridges in Wales
- Old Bridge for other bridges with the same name.
