= Coedpenmaen =

Suburb of Pontypridd, in Rhondda Cynon Taf, Wales

Coordinates: 51.61311°N 3.32396°W

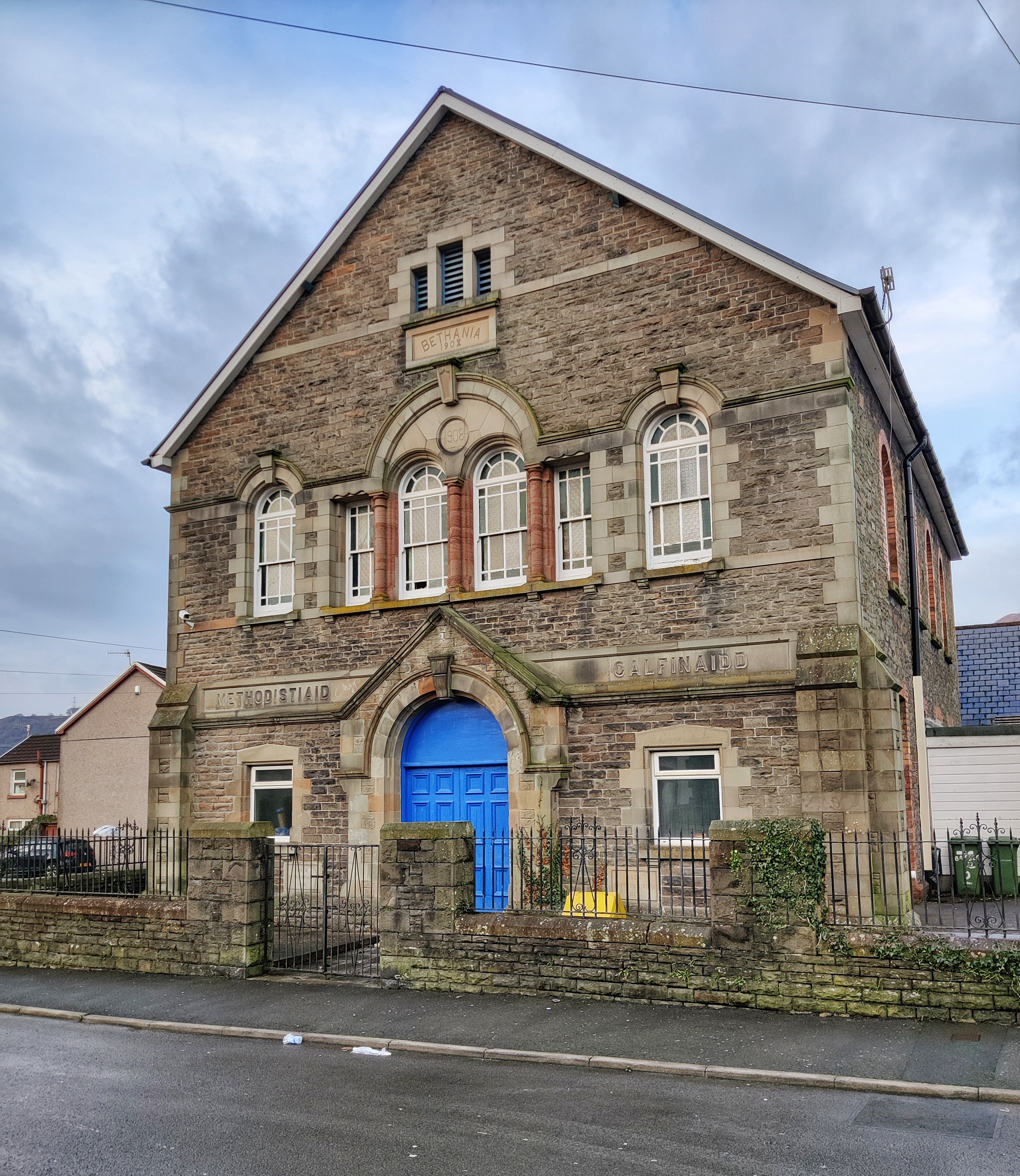
- Bethania Welsh Calvinistic Methodist Chapel

- Location within Rhondda Cynon Taf
- OS grid reference: ST079907
- Principal area: Rhondda Cynon Taf
- Preserved county: Mid Glamorgan
- Country: Wales
- Sovereign state: United Kingdom
- Post town: PONTYPRIDD
- Postcode district: CF37
- Dialling code: 01443
- Police: South Wales
- Fire: South Wales
- Ambulance: Welsh
- UK Parliament: Pontypridd
- Senedd Cymru – Welsh Parliament: Pontypridd

Coedpenmaen (Coed-pen-maen) is a subdistrict of the Pontypridd town district and ward of Trallwng (Trallwn), Rhondda Cynon Taf, South Wales. It also comprises Pontypridd Common or as it is sometimes referred to 'Coedpenmaen Common'. The boundaries between the residential areas of Coedpenmaen and Trallwn themselves are blurred. Just beyond the Common on the way to the adjoining village of Glyntaff is the aptly named small village of Pentrebach (literally Welsh for 'small village').
