= Pontarddulais Male Choir =

- Origin: Pontarddulais, Swansea, Wales
- Genre: Choral
- Years active: 1960–present
- Website: pontarddulaismalechoir.wales

The Pontarddulais Male Choir (Welsh: Côr Meibion Pontarddulais) is a Welsh male voice choir from Pontarddulais near Swansea, Wales. It is the most successful choir in Wales and is internationally renowned having performed in many parts of Europe as well as Canada and the United States.

It has achieved a record seventeen first place wins at the Royal National Eisteddfod, the latest of which was at Cardiff in 2018. The choir also won the Choir of the Festival award in 2004 and 2006.

In 2001 and 2004 the Pontarddulais Male Choir won the Best Male Choir award at the Llangollen International Eisteddfod. Other first places include 10 times at the Cardigan Eisteddfod, 5 times winners at the Miners Eisteddfod in Porthcawl and twice winners at the Pantyfedwen Eisteddfod in Pontrhydfendigaid.

The choir, conducted by Noel Davies, performed choral parts for the soundtrack of the film Pink Floyd – The Wall (1982), including the track "When the Tigers Broke Free", which was released as a single; and recorded with Roger Waters on his second solo studio album Radio K.A.O.S. (1987).

== History ==
Pontardulais Male Choir was established in 1960, under the leadership of the late Noel Davies MBE. It was borne out of the Pontarddulais Youth Choir which had become too old for youth competitions.

Under Noel's leadership the choir won a record 11 firsts at the Royal National Eisteddfod of Wales, and one first at the International Eisteddfod, Llangollen until he handed the role to Clive Phillips in 2001, when he retired after 41 years unbroken service as Musical director.

== Recordings ==
The earliest known recording by the members of the Pontarddulais Male Choir was made in June 1962 in the Brangwyn Hall, Swansea at a Service given by the NFSH. The conductor was T. Hayden Thomas, M.B.E., and the organist was Ivor Owen. The 10" LP contained Rhyd-y-Groes, Calon Lan, Teyrnasoedd-y-Ddaear, Gracious Spirit of Thy Goodness, The Lord's My Shepherd, and "He That Shall Endure to the End" from Elijah. It was recorded by David Kent-Watson of Lawrence Recordings, later to become Cameo Classics.

Hearts and Voices (2017)

Songs from Wales Pontarddulais Male Choir /Iona Jones (Soprano) Pontarddulais Male Choir (2007)

Men Of Harlech, Clawss Madog, Y Blodyn A Holltodd Y Maen (The Flower That Shattered The Stone), Over The Rainbow (Iona Jones & Choir), Y Tangnefeddwyr (The Peace Makers), The Lord's Prayer, Take Me Home, Morte Criste (When I Survey The Wondrous Cross), Christus Salvator, Sweet Georgia Brown, Dashenka (Y Sipsiwn), Mil Harddach Wyt Na'r Rhosyn Gwyn, Tydi A Roddaist (Thou Gavest), Calon Lan, Li'l Liza Jane, Gwahoddiad, Cymru Fach (Iona Jones & Choir) (My Own Little Country), As Long As I Have Music

Great Voices of Wales: Choral Wonders (2006)

Softly As I Leave You, Ride The Chariot, Diolch L'r Lor, Finnish Forest, Windmills Of Your Mind, Thanks Be To God, An Evening's Pastorale, Bryn Myrddin, Christus Redemptor, My Lord What A Mornin', Memory, Lord's Prayer, Bywyd Y Bugail, Mill Harddach Wyt Na'r Rhosyn Gwyn, Comrades In Arms

Sing Songs of England, Scotland, Ireland & Wales (1996)

Down Among The Dead Men, Tom Bowling, Linden Lea, Golden Slumbers, Annie Laurie, Flow Gently Sweet Afton, Ye Banks And Braes, Will Ye No Come Back Again, Oft In The Still Of The Night, Londonderry Air, She Moves Through The Fair, Cockles And Mussels, March Of The Men Of Harlech, All Through The Night, Davis Of The White Rock, Watching The Wheat

Softly As I Leave You (1994)

Softly As I Leave You, Ride The Chariot, Diolch I'r Ior, The Finnish Forest, The Windmills Of Your Mind, Thanks Be To God, An Evening's Pastorale, Bryn Myrddin, Christus Redemptor, My Lord What A Mornin', Memory, The Lord's Prayer, Bywyd Y Bugail, Mil Harddach Wyt Na'r Rhosyn Gwyn, Comrades In Arms,

We'll Keep a Welcome (1993)

Sain Tawelwch (The Sound Of Silence)

Christmas From The Land of Song: The Massed Male Choirs of Morriston Orpheus Treorchy and Pontarddulais with The Band of The Welsh Guards by Various (1995)

Land of my Fathers by Pontarddulais Male voice Choir, Morriston Orpheus Choir, and Caerphilly Male voice Choir

== Patrons ==
- Shân Cothi
- Wyn Davies
- Ieuan Evans MBE
- Gareth Glyn
- Alun Guy
- Rt. Hon. Peter Hain MP
- Edwina Hart MBE, AM
- Brian Hughes
- H.M. Lord Lieutenant D Byron Lewis CStJ, FCA
- Dennis O'Neill
- Garry Owen
- Eirian Owen
- Elin Manahan Thomas
- Huw Tregelles Williams DL
- Haydn James
- John Hartson
