= Trallwn =

District in Rhondda Cynon Taf, Wales

Coordinates: 51.608°N 3.335°W

Trallwng
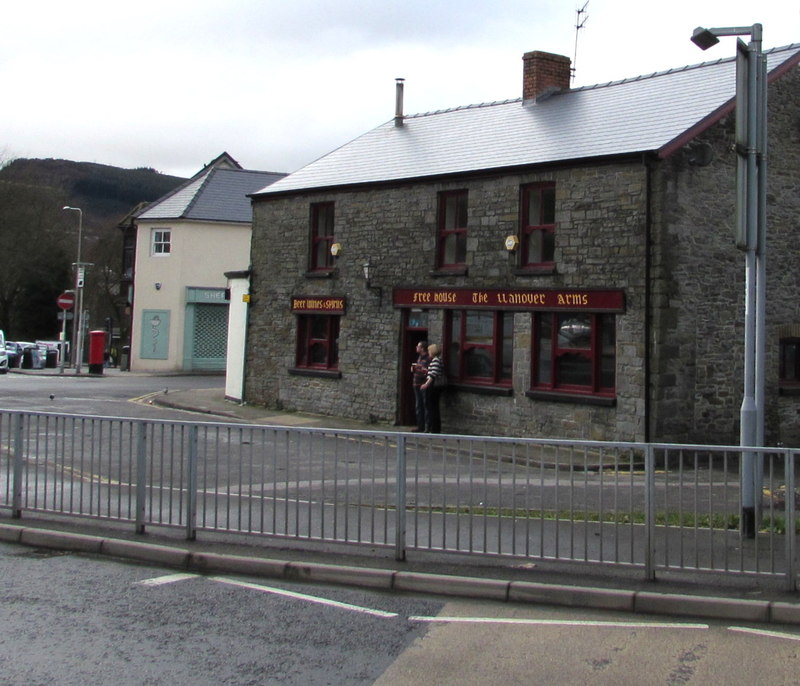

- Location within Rhondda Cynon Taf
- OS grid reference: ST076908
- Principal area: Rhondda Cynon Taf
- Preserved county: Mid Glamorgan
- Country: Wales
- Sovereign state: United Kingdom
- Post town: PONTYPRIDD
- Postcode district: CF37
- Dialling code: 01443
- Police: South Wales
- Fire: South Wales
- Ambulance: Welsh
- UK Parliament: Pontypridd
- Senedd Cymru – Welsh Parliament: Pontypridd

Trallwn is a district, and as Trallwng, an electoral ward, within the town of Pontypridd, Rhondda Cynon Taf, South Wales, sited along the banks of the River Taff (Afon Taf) and falling within the historic parish of Eglwysilan. Trallwn comprises the subdistricts of Coedpenmaen (Coed-Pen-Maen), Ynysangharad and Pontypridd Common. Until recently Trallwn was also home to the famous Brown Lenox (Newbridge) Chain & Anchor Works at Ynysangharad, which was recently demolished. Also at Ynysangharad are some of the last remains of the Glamorganshire Canal which was used to transport coal and iron from the South Wales Valleys to the city of Cardiff. Ynysangharad is also home to Pontypridd's War Memorial Park - Ynysangharad Park (known colloquially as 'Ponty Park').

As with other communities along the route of the former Glamorganshire Canal (including Abercynon, Cilfynydd, Pontsionnorton, Glyntaff, Rhydyfelin, Hawthorn, Upper Boat, and Nantgarw), Trallwn owed at least some of its initial fortunes to the iron industries of Merthyr Tydfil served by the canal, later to be fuelled by the exploitation of coal in the Rhondda and Cynon valleys including the sinking of several nearby collieries (e.g. the Albion Colliery at Cilfynydd) and the need to house the rapidly expanding population of Pontypridd.
