= Pontypridd =

Town in Wales

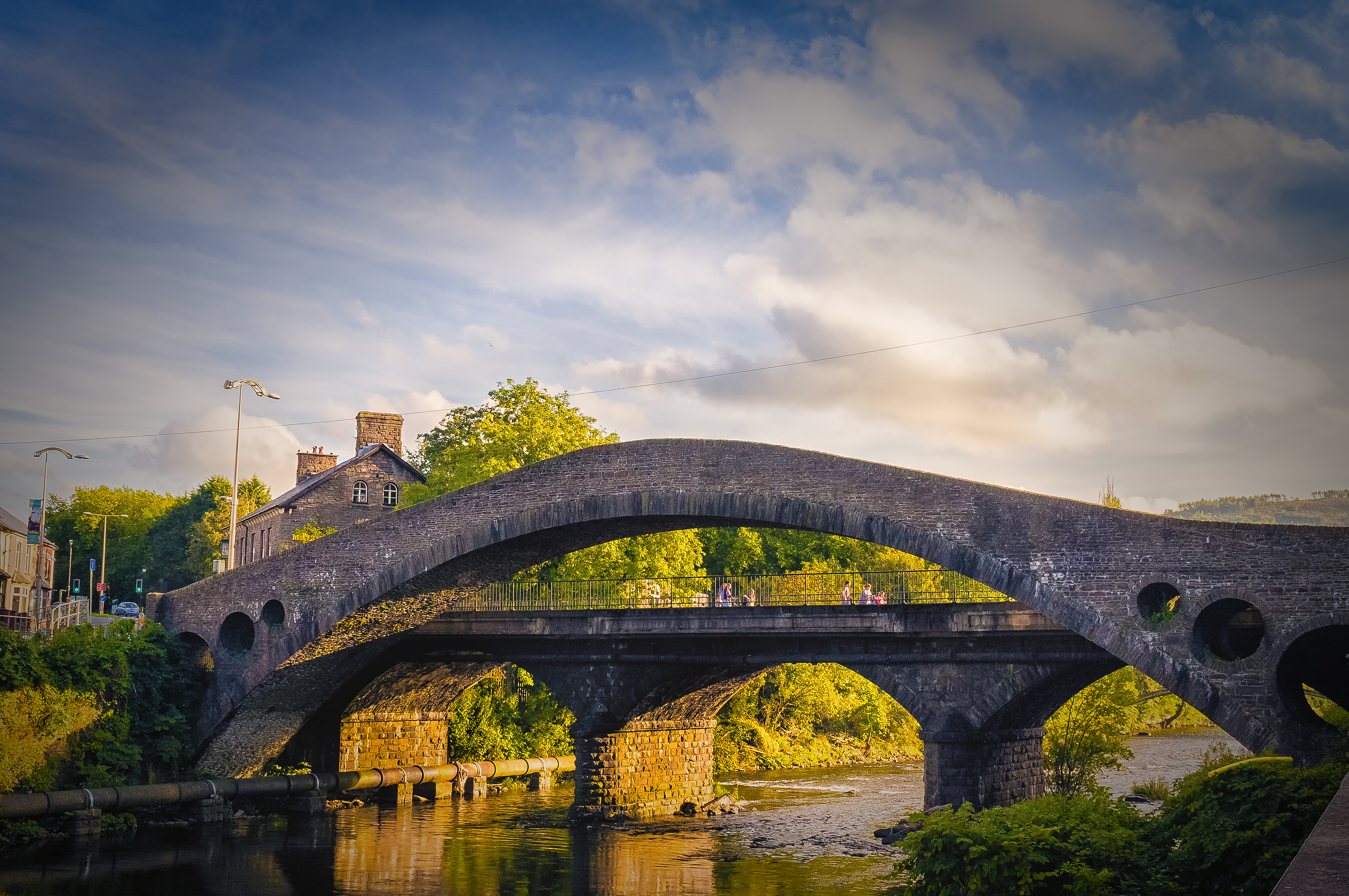
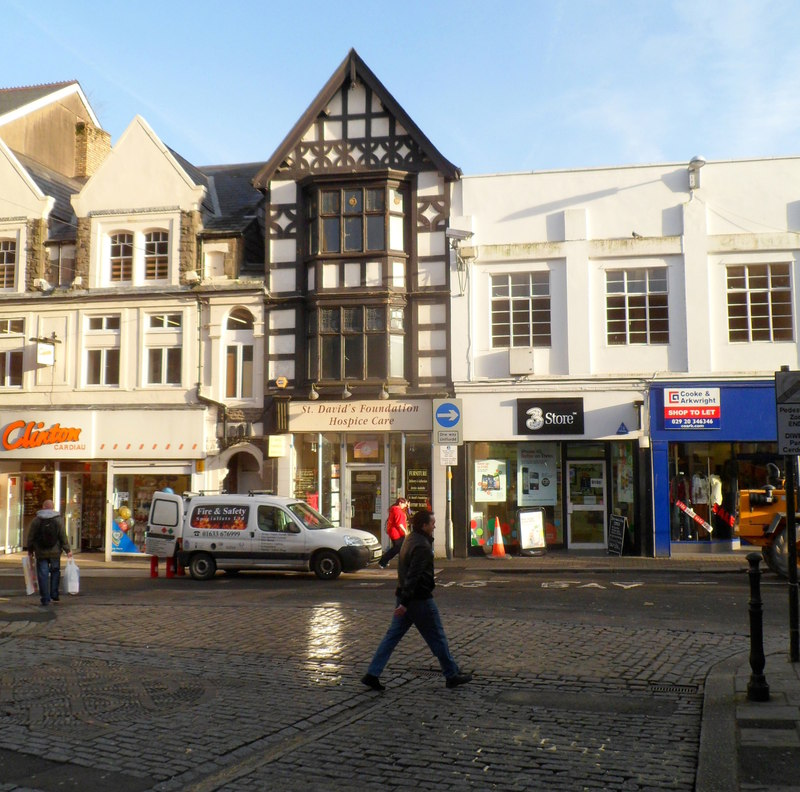
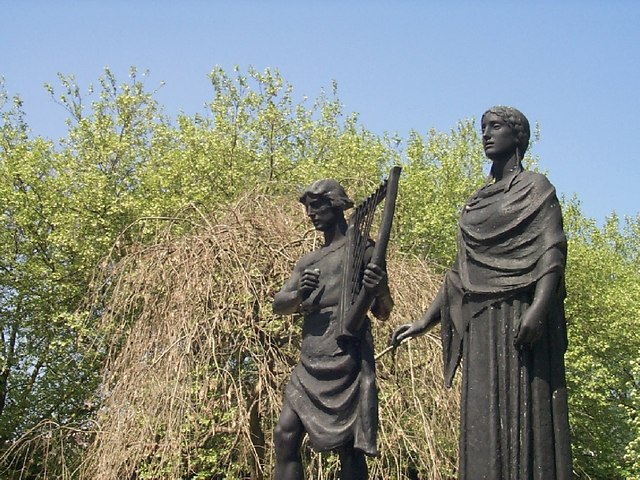
- From the top, The Old Bridge, Town Centre, Monument to Evan James & James James in Ynysangharad Park

- Location within Rhondda Cynon Taf
- Population: 31,206 (2021)
- OS grid reference: ST075895
- Community: Pontypridd Town
- Principal area: Rhondda Cynon Taf
- Preserved county: Mid Glamorgan
- Country: Wales
- Sovereign state: United Kingdom
- Post town: PONTYPRIDD
- Postcode district: CF37
- Dialling code: 01443
- Police: South Wales
- Fire: South Wales
- Ambulance: Welsh
- UK Parliament: Pontypridd
- Senedd Cymru – Welsh Parliament: Pontypridd, South Wales Central Electoral Region
- List of places UK Wales Rhondda Cynon Taf 51.602°N 3.342°W Community map: Map of the community

Pontypridd (/ˌpɒntɪˈpriːð/ PON-tih-PREEDH, Welsh: [ˌpɔntəˈpriːð]; colloquially referred to as Ponty) is a town and a community in Rhondda Cynon Taf, South Wales, approximately 10 miles (16 km) north west of Cardiff city centre.

== Geography ==
Pontypridd comprises the electoral wards of Cilfynydd, Glyncoch, Graig, Hawthorn, Pontypridd Town, 'Rhondda', Rhydyfelin Central/Ilan, Trallwng (Trallwn) and Treforest. The town mainly falls within the Senedd and UK parliamentary constituency by the same name, although the Cilfynydd and Glyncoch wards fall within the Cynon Valley Senedd constituency and the Cynon Valley UK parliamentary constituency. This change was effective for the 2007 Welsh Assembly election, and for the 2010 UK General Election.

The town sits at the junction of the Rhondda and Taff valleys, where the River Rhondda flows into the Taff just south of the town at Ynysangharad War Memorial Park. Pontypridd community recorded a population of about 32,700 in the 2011 census figures. while Pontypridd Town ward itself was recorded as having a population of 2,919 also as of 2011.

The town lies alongside the north–south dual carriageway A470 between Cardiff and Merthyr Tydfil. The A4054, running north and south of the town, was the former main road, and like the A470, follows the Taff Valley. South of the town is the A473 for Llantrisant and Pencoed. To the west is the A4058, which follows the River Rhondda to Porth and the Rhondda Valley beyond.

== History ==
=== Etymology ===
The name Pontypridd derives from the name Pont y tŷ pridd, Welsh for "bridge by the earthen house", referring singly to successive wooden bridges that once spanned the River Taff at this point.

=== Old Bridge ===
Pontypridd is noted for its Old Bridge, a stone construction across the River Taff built in 1756 by William Edwards. This was Edwards's fourth attempt, and at the time of construction, was the longest single-span stone arch bridge in the world. Rising 35 feet (11 m) above the level of the river, the bridge forms a perfect segment of a circle, the chord of which is 140 feet (43 m). Notable features are the three holes of differing diameters through each end of the bridge, the purpose of which is to reduce weight. On completion, questions were soon raised as to the utility of the bridge, with the steepness of the design making it difficult to get horses and carts across. As a result, a new bridge, the Victoria Bridge, paid for by public subscription, was built adjacent to the old one in 1857. Pontypridd was known as Newbridge from shortly after the construction of the Old Bridge until the 1860s.

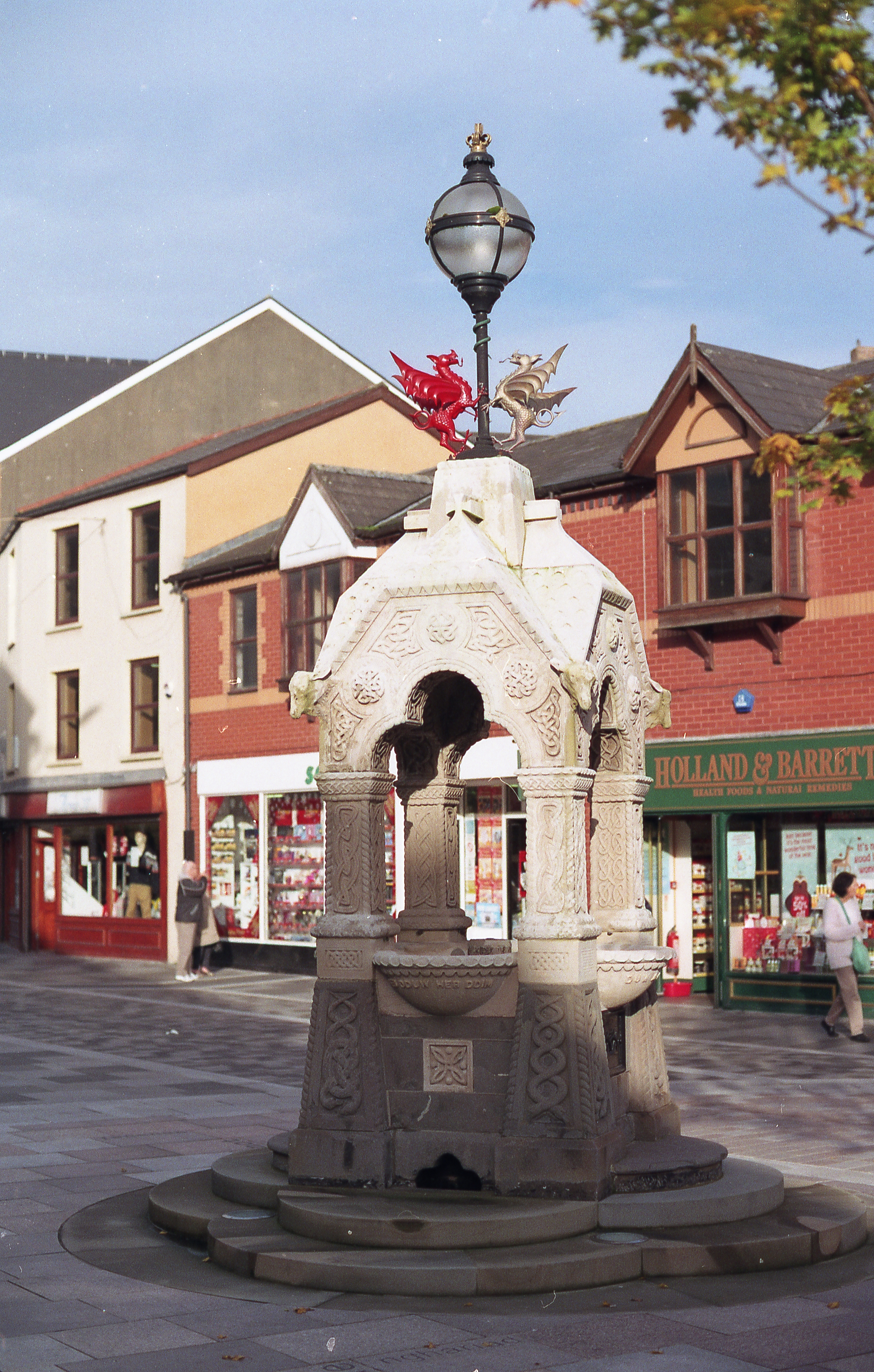
The drinking fountain in Taff St, Pontypridd, donated in 1895 by Sir Alfred Thomas, MP for East Glamorgan

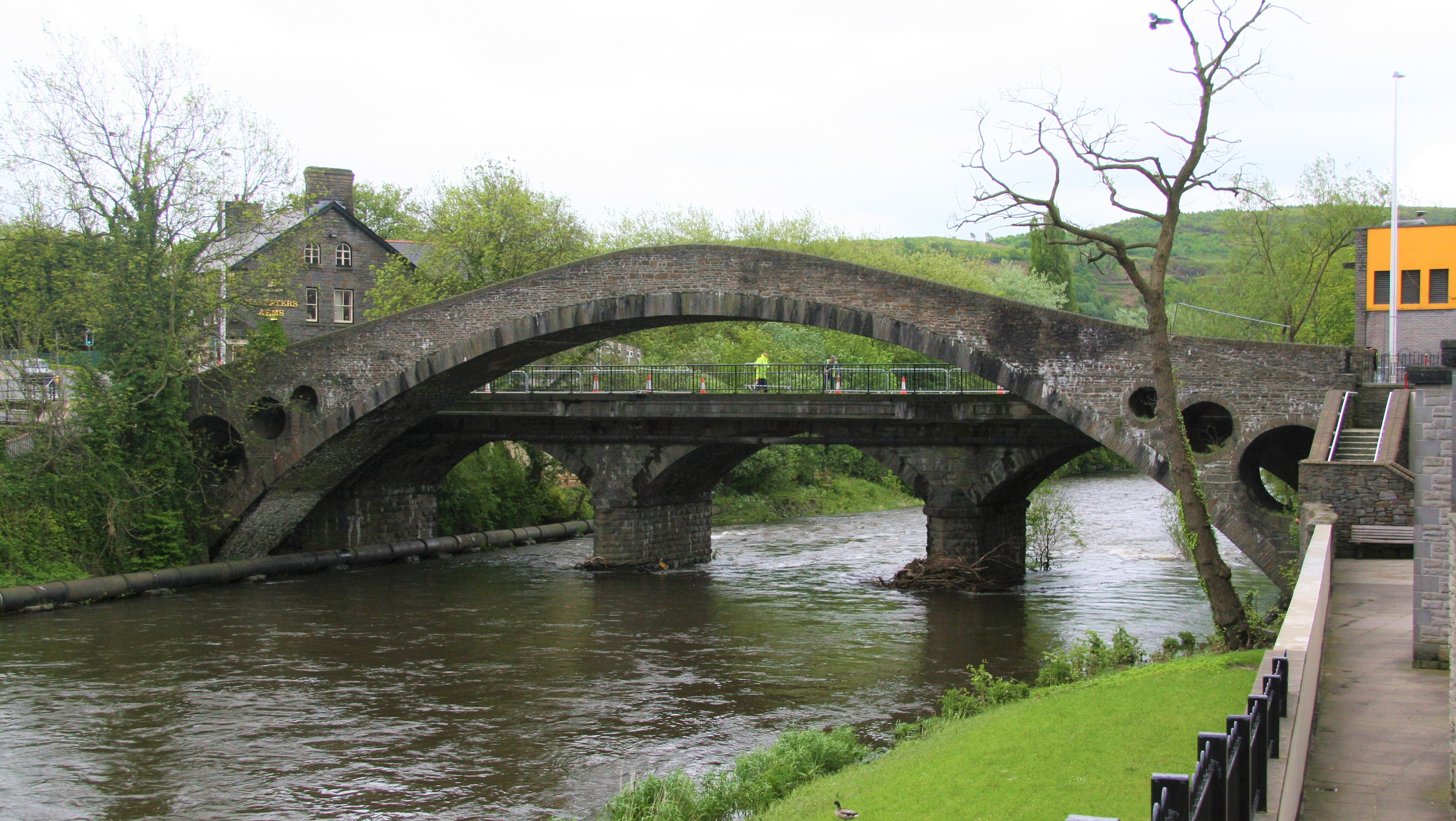
Old Bridge, dating from 1756

=== Coal ===
The history of Pontypridd is tied to the coal and iron industries; before their development Pontypridd was a hamlet of a few farmsteads, with Treforest initially becoming the main urban settlement in the area. Sited at the junction of three valleys, it became an important location for transporting coal from the Rhondda and iron from Merthyr Tydfil, first by the Glamorganshire Canal, and later by the Taff Vale Railway, to the ports at Cardiff, Barry and Newport. Its role in coal transport lengthened its railway platform, which is thought to have once been the longest in the world in its heyday. Pontypridd in the second half of the 19th century was a hive of industry, once nicknamed the "Wild West". There were several collieries within the Pontypridd area itself, including:

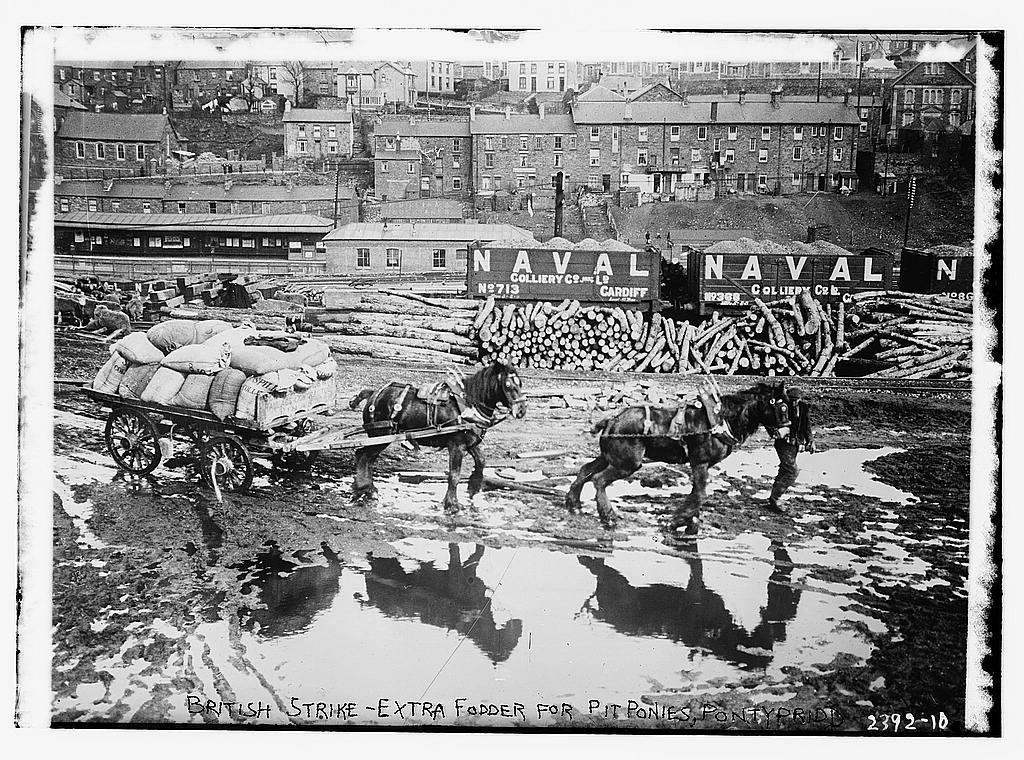
Tonypandy & Trealaw railway station during an early 1910s coal strike

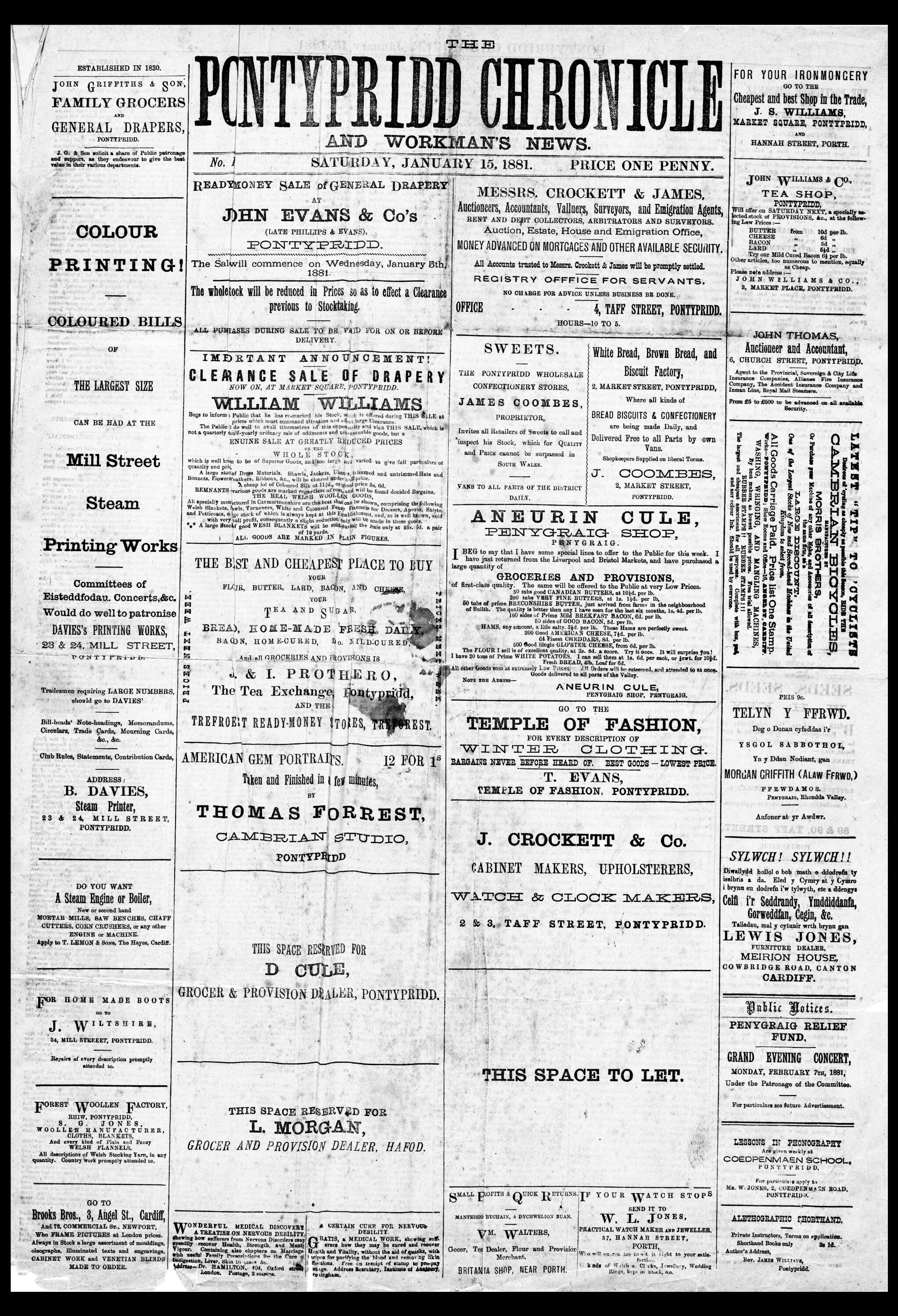
Front page of the earliest surviving copy of the Welsh newspaper The Pontypridd Chronicle; 15 January 1881

- Albion Colliery, Cilfynydd
- Bodwenarth Colliery, Pontsionnorton
- Daren Ddu Colliery, Graigwen & Glyncoch
- Dynea Colliery, Rhydyfelen
- Gelli-whion Colliery, Graig
- Great Western/Gyfeillion Colliery, Hopkinstown
- Lan Colliery, Hopkinstown
- Newbridge Colliery, Graig
- Pen-y-rhiw Colliery, Graig
- Pontypridd/Maritime Collieries, Graig & Maesycoed
- Pwllgwaun Colliery/'Dan's Muck Hole', Pwllgwaun
- Red Ash Colliery, Cilfynydd
- Ty-Mawr Colliery, Hopkinstown & Pantygraigwen
- Typica Colliery, Hopkinstown & Pantygraigwen, and
- Victoria Colliery, Maesycoed

As well as deep-mined collieries, there were many coal levels and trial shafts dug into the hillsides overlooking the town from Cilfynydd, Graig, Graigwen and Hafod. The Albion Colliery in the village of Cilfynydd in 1894 underwent one of the worst explosions in the South Wales coalfield, with the death of 290 colliers (see Keir Hardie).

=== Iron and steel ===
Other instrumental industries in Pontypridd were the Brown Lenox/Newbridge Chain & Anchor Works south-east of the town, and Crawshay's Forest Iron, Steel & Tin Plate Works and the Taff Vale Iron Works, both in Treforest near the now University of South Wales.

=== Buildings ===
The town has a hospital, Dewi Sant Hospital and acts as the headquarters of Transport for Wales Rail at Llys Cadwyn.

== Government ==
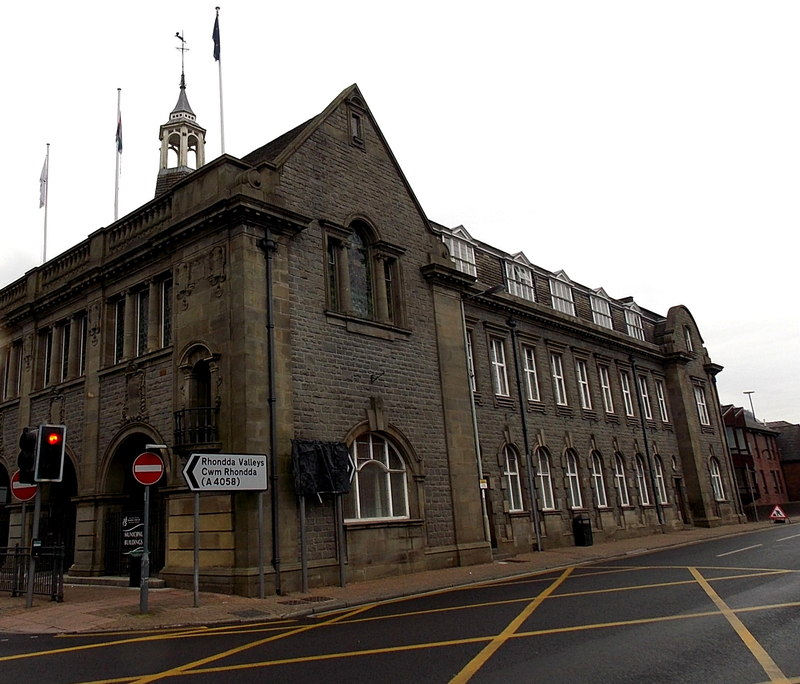
Pontypridd Municipal Buildings

Pontypridd Urban District Council operated from 1894 to 1974, when it was incorporated into Taff Ely Borough Council. That in turn came under the unitary Rhondda Cynon Taf Council in 1996. Pontypridd Town Council functions as a community council. Labour is the dominant political force and has been since the First World War. The community elects 23 town councillors from 11 community wards: Cilfynydd, Glyncoch, Graig, Hawthorn, Ilan, Pontypridd, Rhondda, Rhydfelen Central, Rhydfelen Lower, Trallwng and Treforest. Pontypridd Municipal Buildings was completed in 1904.

== Pontypridd community ==
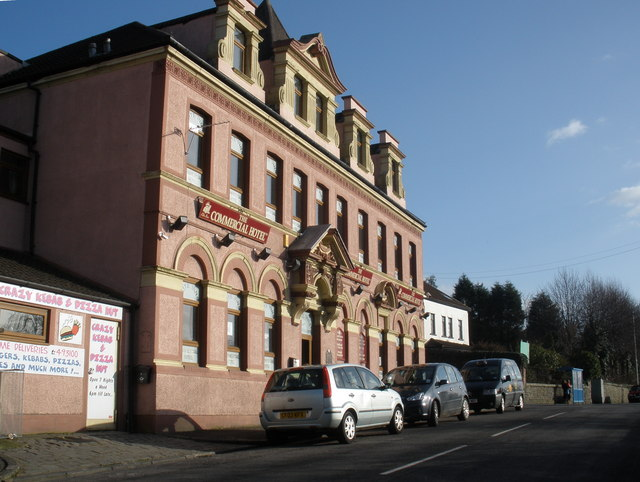
The Cilfynydd Commercial Hotel in Cilfynydd

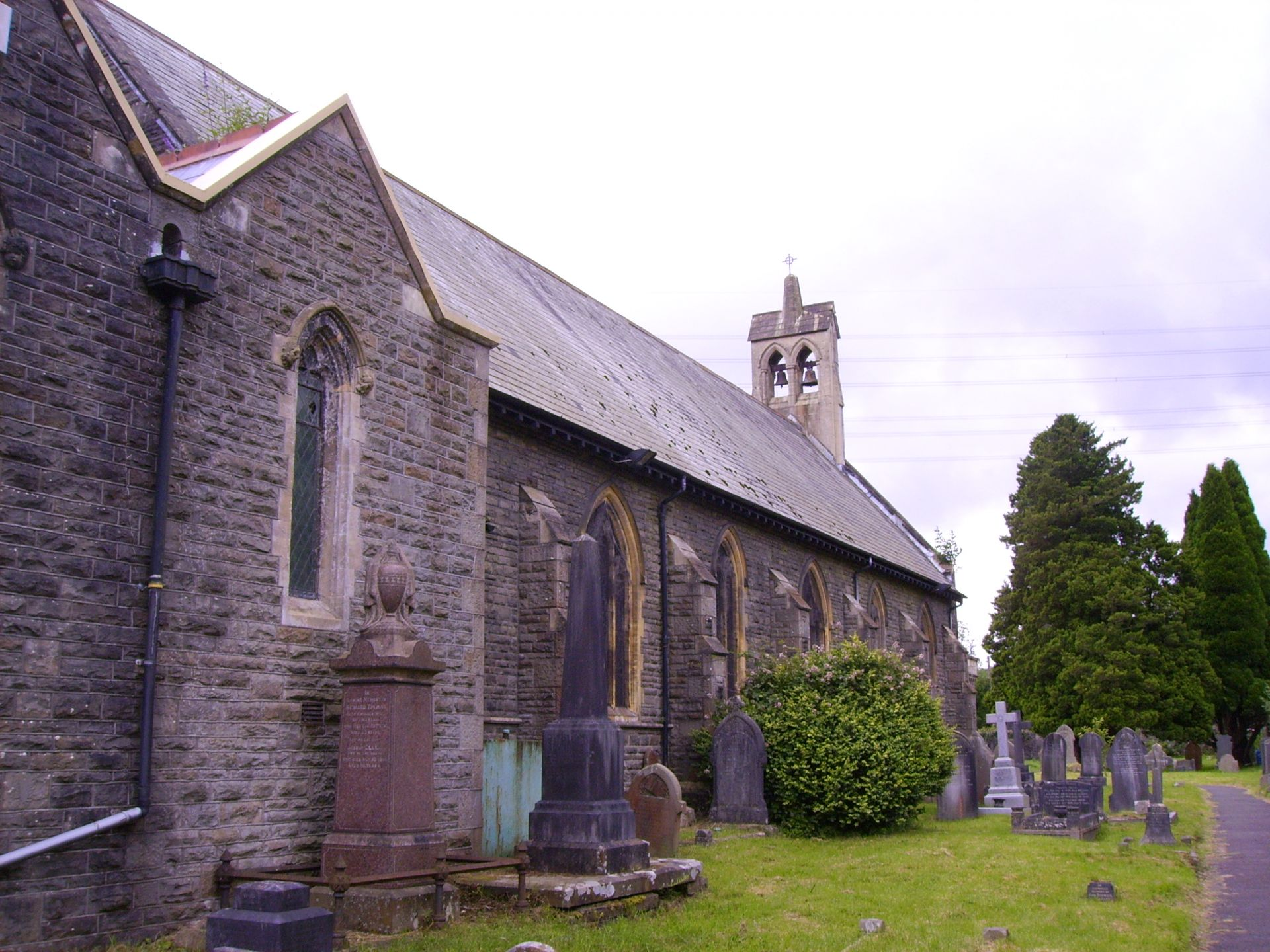
St. David's Church in Hopkinstown (closed Feb 2022)

Pontypridd community comprises the town centre itself, with the following key villages/settlements:

- Cilfynydd
- Coedpenmaen (Coed-Pen-Maen)
- Glyntaff
- Glyncoch
- Graig
- Graigwen & Pantygraigwen
- Hawthorn
- Hopkinstown
- Maesycoed
- Pen-y-coedcae
- Pontsionnorton (Pont Sion Norton)
- Pwllgwaun
- Rhydyfelin
- Trallwn (Trallwng)
- Treforest
- Upper Boat

Pontypridd serves as the postal town for the community of Llantwit Fardre under the CF38 postcode district, although the area is not considered part of Pontypridd.

== Transport links ==
Pontypridd came into being because of transport, as it was on the drovers' route from the south Wales coast and the Bristol Channel, to Merthyr, and onwards into the hills of Brecon. Although initial expansion in the valleys occurred at Treforest due to the slower speed of the River Taff at that point, the establishment of better bridge building meant a natural flow of power to Pontypridd.

=== Railway ===
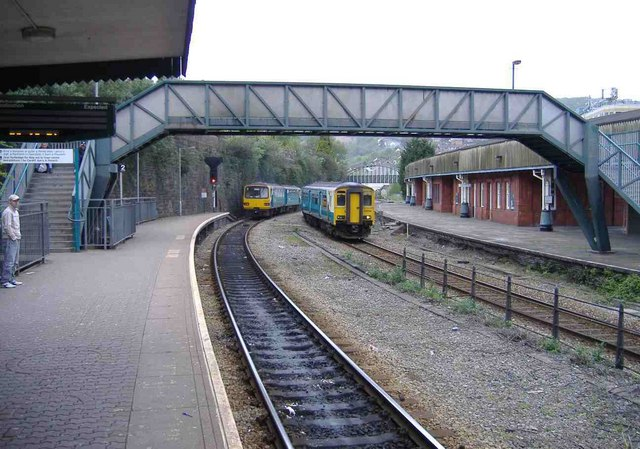
Railway station

The establishment of Pontypridd over Treforest was finally confirmed with the building of the Glamorganshire Canal to serve the coalmines of the Rhondda Valley. However, the volumes of coal extraction soon led to construction of the Taff Vale Railway, which at its peak meant a train passed through Pontypridd railway station (including the freight lines immediately to its west) every two or three minutes. The station was originally built as a long single island, at one point the world's longest platform, a reflection of both the narrow available geography of the steep valley side and the need to accommodate many converging railways lines at what became the 19th-century hub of the valleys.

Due to the restrictive geography, only parcels and mail were handled at Pontypridd. Heavy freight went to Treforest. The station today is operated by Transport for Wales, which is headquartered in the town. It reflects the fewer destinations served since the Beeching and earlier cuts, with one up (valley) platform, one down (through) platform, a down bay platform (opened in December 2014), and one passing loop.

=== Trams, trolleybuses, and buses ===
A tram service began on 6 March 1905 from Cilfynydd through Pontypridd to Treforest. It gave way on 18 September 1930 to trolleybuses, which on 31 January 1957 were replaced by buses following the same route.

== Education ==
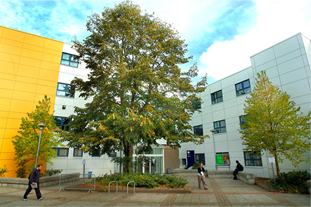
Glamorgan Business School (university)

- Pontypridd County Intermediate and Technical School was built in 1895 as a co-educational school in Tyfica Road, later becoming Pontypridd County Grammar School for Boys. In 1973, it became the Coedylan Comprehensive School, and is now the Pontypridd High School in Cilfynydd on the west side of the A4054.
- Hawthorn High School is near the A4054 in Hawthorn (south-east of the town)
- Pontypridd Grammar School for Girls was on Glyntaff Road in Glyntaff.
- Bryn Celynnog Comprehensive School is on Penycoedcae Road in Beddau.
- Cardinal Newman RC School is on Dynea Road in Rhydyfelin.
- Ysgol Garth Olwg is on the A473 in Church Village (south of the town).
- The University of South Wales is in Treforest (south of the town), next to the A473.

== Entertainment and social history ==
=== Sport and recreation ===
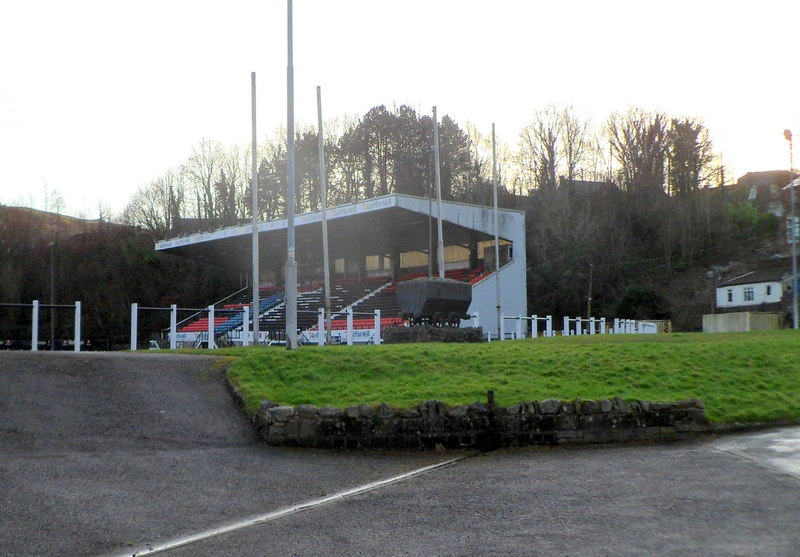
Sardis Road rugby ground

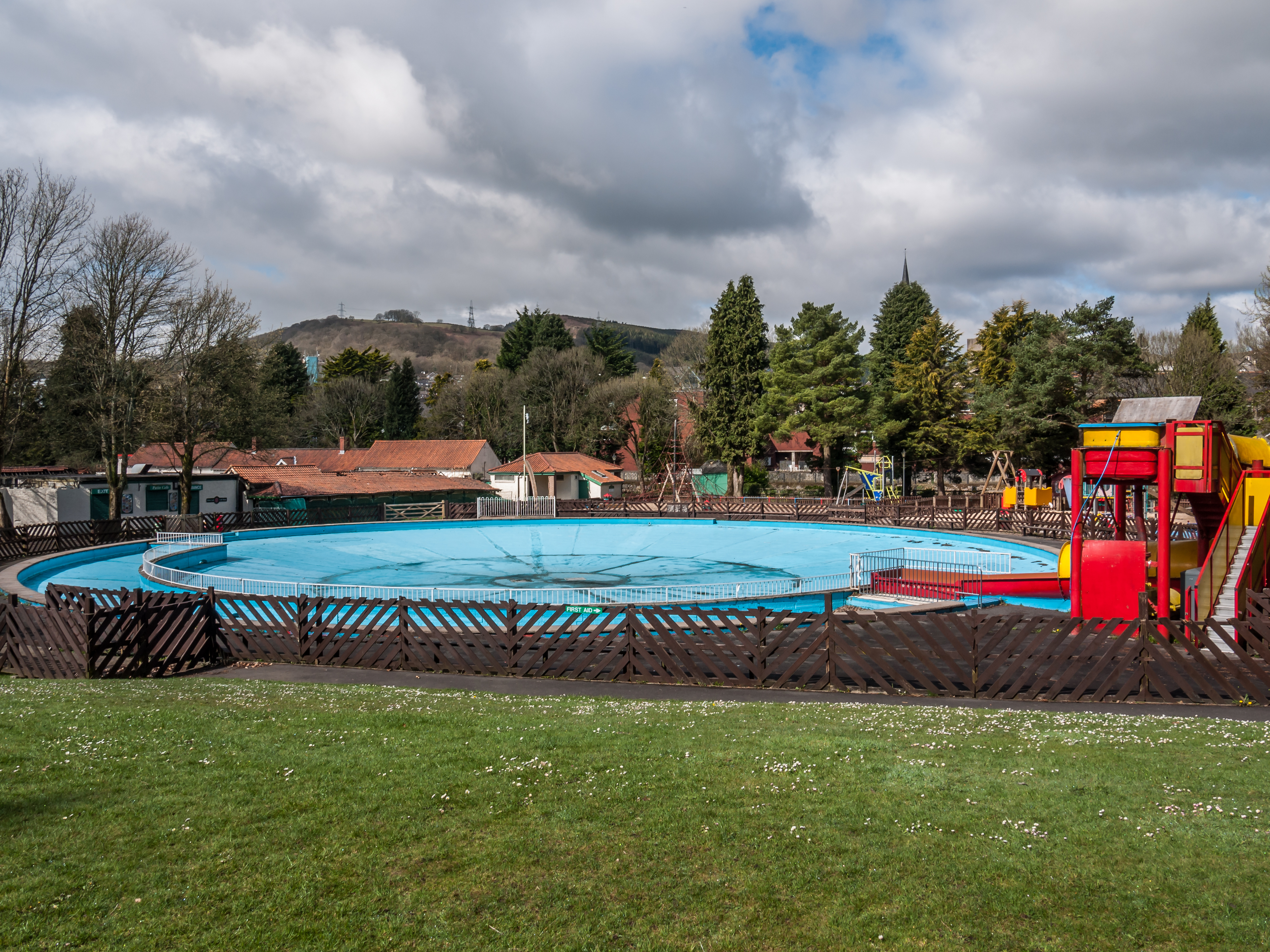
The former paddling pool in Ynysangharad Park, now removed

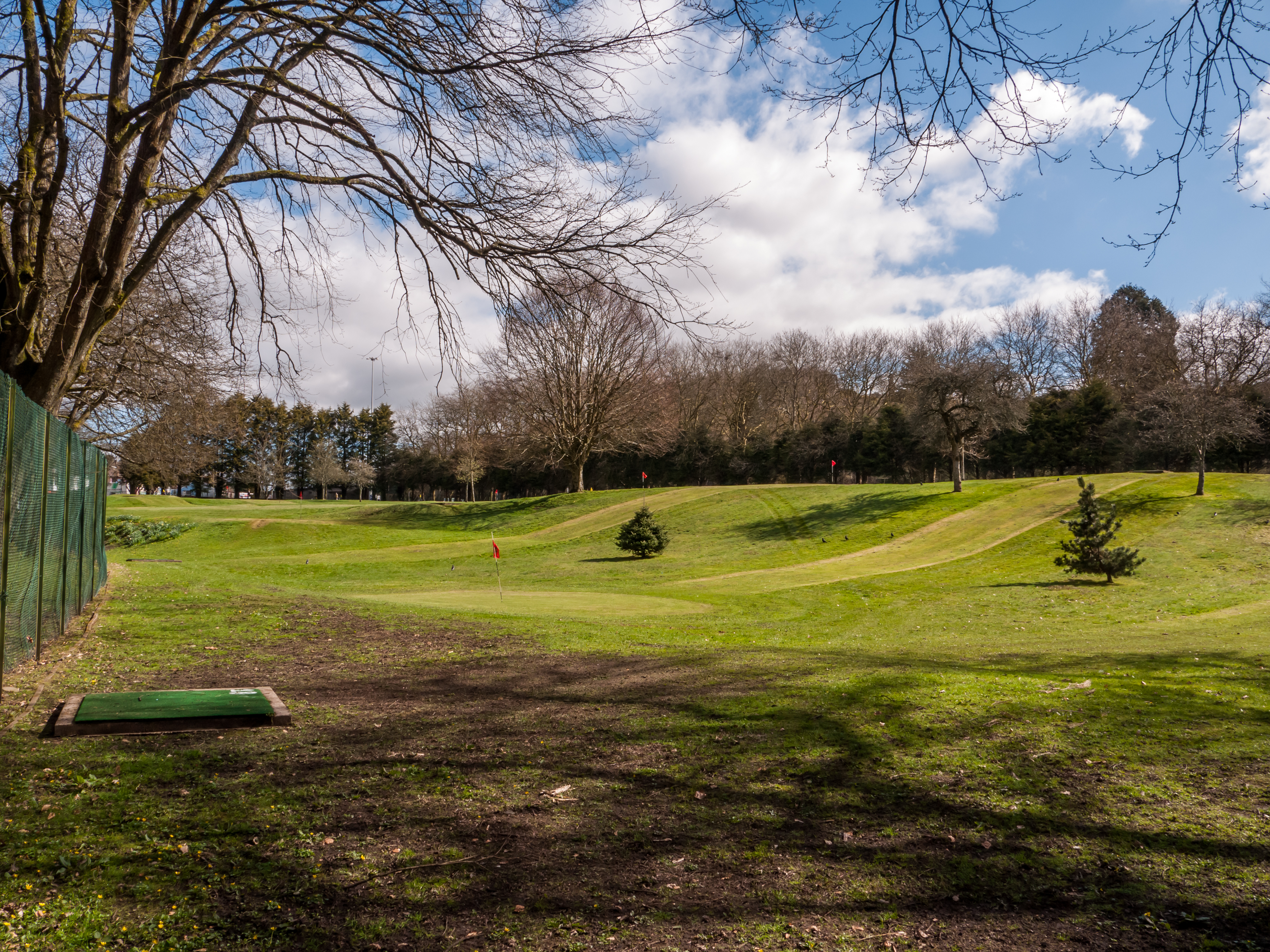
The pitch and putt golf course in Ynysangharad Park, now removed

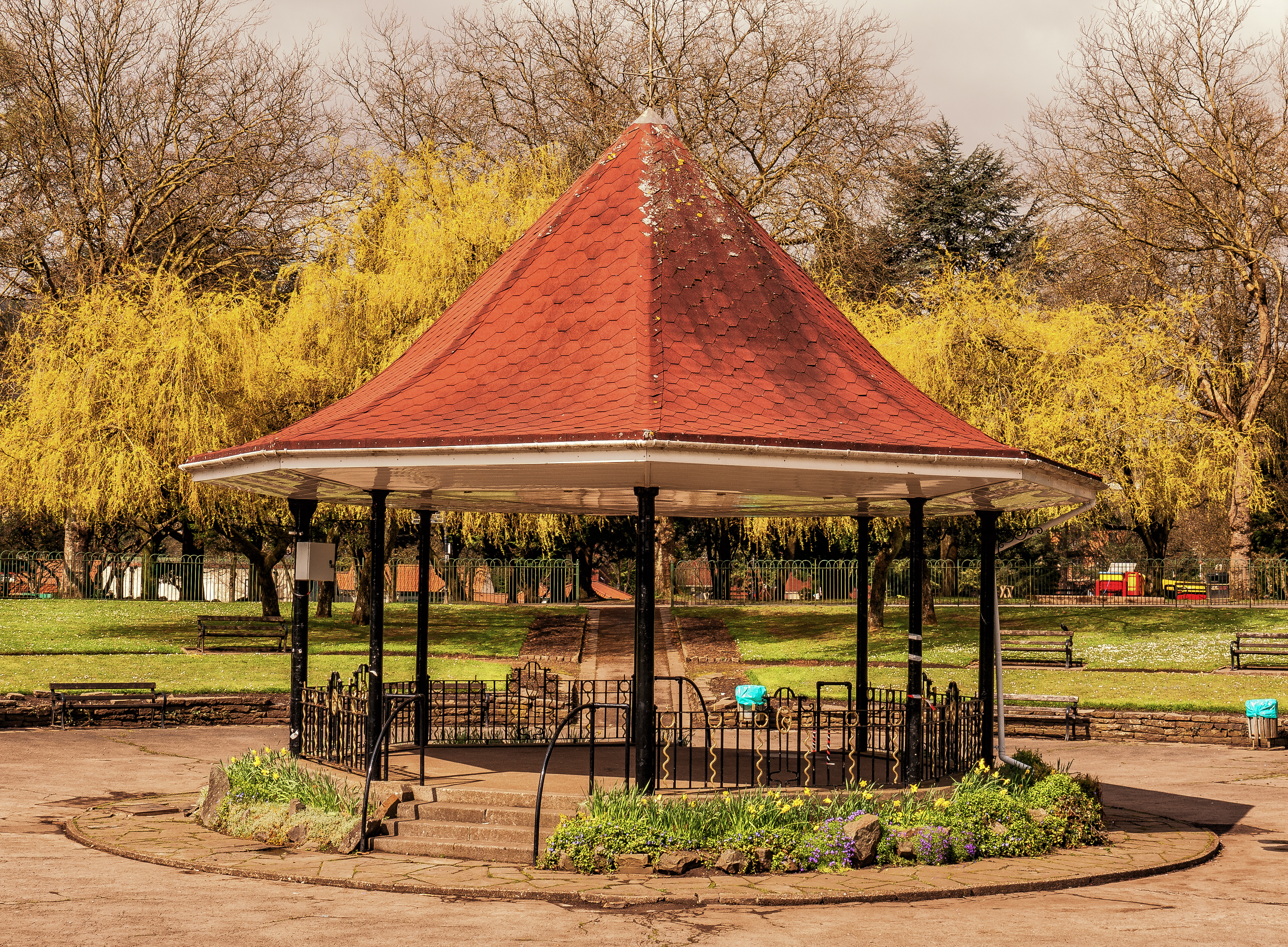
The bandstand in Ynysangharad Park

- Ynysangharad War Memorial Park, opened by Field Marshal Viscount Allenby on 6 August 1923, features a bandstand, basketball courts, a dog exercise area, a lido swimming pool (dubbed the National Lido of Wales), tennis courts, lawn bowls greens, a football pitch, a cricket pitch, and memorials to the war dead of Pontypridd and to the composers of the Welsh national anthem. It has also hosted festivals and music concerts, including the annual Ponty's Big Weekend festival.
- Pontypridd hosts Pontypridd Rugby Football Club, one of Wales's notable rugby union clubs, with a successful junior rugby and age-grade sections. It frequently contribute players to the national team. Formed in 1876, Pontypridd RFC play in the Principality Premiership, SWALEC Cup and the British and Irish Cup. Pontypridd RFC plays home games at Sardis Road, with its junior section playing at Taff Vale Park and Pontypridd High School Fields, Cilfynydd.
- Pontypridd United F.C. is a Welsh football club which currently plays in the Cymru South, the second tier of the Welsh football league system.
- Speedway racing was staged at Taff Vale Park in the town's Broadway area in 1929/1930.
- Pontypridd Bowls Club plays in the top division in the Cynon Valley, Mid Glamorgan and the Cardiff League, having been promoted in all three divisions after the 2009 season. Home games are played at Ynysangharad Park.
- With Pontefract, Pontypool and Pont y Bala, Pontypridd forms a group of parkruns known as “The Full Ponty”, a pun on The Full Monty.

=== Media ===
- GTFM is the local community radio station based in Pontypridd and broadcasts on 107.9FM to the town and the surrounding areas of Rhondda Cynon Taf. Its studios are based in Rhydyfelin, near Cardinal Newman School.
- Pontypridd is also served by several Independent Local Radio stations: Capital South Wales, Heart South Wales and Nation Radio Wales.
- The Pontypridd and Llantrisant Observer is the local weekly newspaper.

=== Culture ===
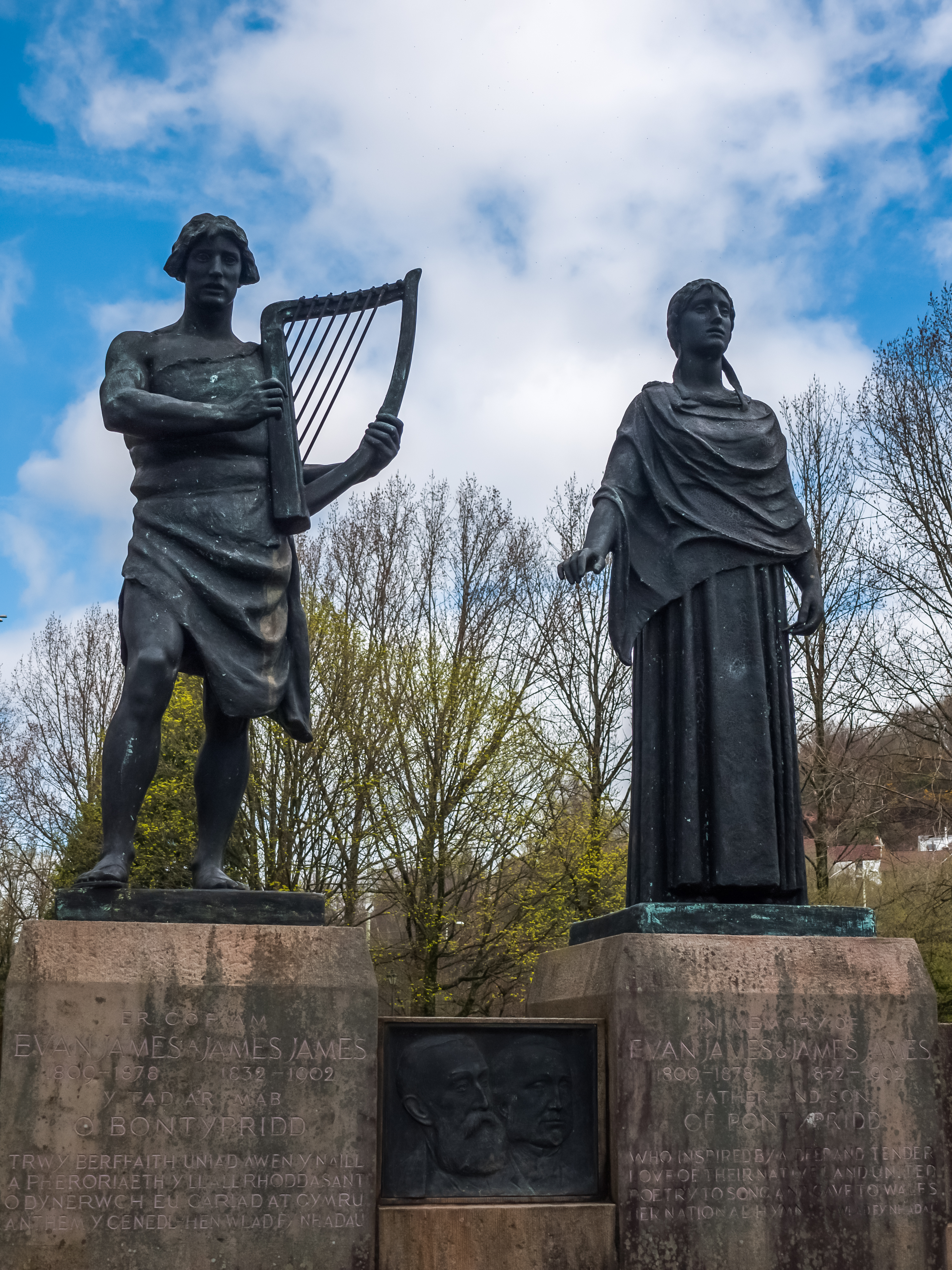
A memorial in Ynysangharad Park to Evan James and James James, composers of the Welsh national anthem

- The Welsh national anthem Hen Wlad Fy Nhadau ('The Land of my Fathers') was composed in Pontypridd by local poets/musicians Evan James and James James.
- Pontypridd hosted the National Eisteddfod in 1893 and also hosted the 2024 National Eisteddfod in Ynysangharad Park.
- Côr Meibion Pontypridd (Pontypridd Male Voice Choir)
- Pontypridd holds the Welsh Poetry Competition, the biggest of its kind in Wales.
- The singer Tom Jones was born in Treforest and often mentions his home town in interviews. He headlined in a 65th birthday concert at the town's Ynysangharad Park.
- The Pontypridd Market and Town Hall contained an auditorium, latterly known as the Town Hall Theatre, which closed in 1982.

=== In popular culture ===
- The name of the fictional Welsh town of Pontypandy, where children's television programme Fireman Sam is set, is a portmanteau of Pontypridd and Tonypandy.
- The Welsh TV show Belonging was shot in Pontypridd.
- The BBC's Doctor Who and Torchwood have been filmed at locations in and around Pontypridd, such as at the Market Tavern, a pub in Market Street, and the Lido in Ynysangharad Park. Other locations include Treforest, Hawthorn, Graigwen, Upper Boat, Trallwng, and Ynysybwl.
- The graphic novel 'The Cosmic Offspring of Pontypridd' (2025) is set in Pontypridd.

=== Twinning ===
Pontypridd is twinned with Nürtingen, Baden-Württemberg, Germany. Initial contact was made between them in 1965, with a visit by Côr Meibion Pontypridd Welsh male voice choir to a choir called Liederkranz ("Coronet of Songs") based in the Oberensingen area of Nürtingen. The visit was returned a year later. Reciprocal choir visits have continued and the partnership prompted Pontypridd Urban District Council to join with Nürtingen in formal twinning relations, under an agreement signed in July 1968 by John Cheesman, Chairman of Pontypridd UDC, and Karl Gonser, Mayor of Nürtingen.

Pontypridd is twinned with Mbale, Uganda, since an official twinning ceremony in 2005, following links by local churches and health-care workers under the charitable Partnerships Overseas Networking Trust.

== Notable people ==
See Category:People from Pontypridd

- Robert Bye (1889–1962), recipient of the Victoria Cross in World War I
- Stuart Burrows (1933–2025), operatic tenor, born in Cilfynydd
- Phil Campbell (1961–2026) of Motörhead
- Doreen Chadwick (1918–2014), theatre organist
- Catrin Collier (born 1948), novelist, had the Tŷ Catrin adult education centre in Pontypridd named in her honour in 2002.
- Joyce Daniel (1890-1985), opened one of the country's first birth control clinics in Pontypridd in 1930.
- Geraint Evans (1922–1992), opera singer, born in Cilfynydd.
- Lee Gaze (born 1975), former lead guitarist for Lostprophets and current lead/rhythm guitarist and backup vocalist for No Devotion.
- Beverley Humphreys (born 1947), operatic and concert singer and broadcaster.
- Evan James (1809–1878) and James James (1832–1902), writers of Hen Wlad Fy Nhadau, the national anthem of Wales
- Alan Wayne Jones (born 1945), forensic toxicologist
- David Lloyd Jones (born 1952), Judge of the High Court (QBD), Lord Justice of Appeal, and first Justice of the Supreme Court of the United Kingdom to come from Wales was educated at Pontypridd Boys' Grammar School.
- Tom Jones (born 1940), singer, was born at 57 Kingsland Terrace in village of Treforest.
- David Kelly (1944–2003), specialist in biological warfare, attended Pontypridd Boys' Grammar School.
- Elaine Morgan (1920–2013), scriptwriter and anthropologist
- Kimberley Nixon (born 1985), actress
- Mike Lewis (born 1977), former Lostprophets and No Devotion rhythm guitarist
- Morfydd Llwyn Owen (1891-1918), composer, pianist and mezzo-soprano
- William Price (1800–1893) carried out the first cremation in the UK in modern times on Llantrisant Common.
- Merlyn Rees (1920-2006), Labour Party politician
- Chris Slade (born 1946), drummer for AC/DC and Asia
- Stephen Volk (born 1954), screenwriter and novelist
- Ian Watkins (1977–2025), disgraced former Lostprophets lead singer and songwriter
- Tasker Watkins (1918–2007), VC, Lord Justice of Appeal, deputy Lord Chief Justice, and President of the Welsh Rugby Union, was educated at Pontypridd Boys' Grammar School
- Naunton Wayne (1901–1970), actor, born in Llanwonno
- Iris Williams (1946-2025), singer, born in Rhydyfelin
- Gareth Wood (1950-2023), composer

=== Sports people ===
- Danny Canning (1926–2014), association footballer
- Keith Cooper (football referee) (born 1948), former Premier League referee
- Steve Cooper (born 1979), professional association football manager
- Glyn Davies (rugby union) (1927-1976), Welsh international rugby player
- Jamie Donaldson (born 1975), professional golfer
- Colin Gale (1932–2008), association footballer
- Harri Greville (born 1990), rugby league footballer
- John Gwilliam (1923–2016) Welsh international rugby player
- Richard Haig (born 1970), association footballer
- Cory Hill (born 1992) Welsh international rugby player
- Ceri Hughes (born 1971), association footballer
- Jenny James (1927–2014), first Welsh person to swim the English Channel (in 1951)
- Neil Jenkins (born 1971) Welsh international rugby player
- Sheila Laxon the first female horse trainer to win the Australian "cups double": the Caulfield Cup and Melbourne Cup
- Ella Lloyd (born 2005) Welsh racing driver
- Pat Mountain (born 1976), association footballer
- Kevin Morgan (born 1977) Welsh international rugby player
- Michael Owen (born 1980) Welsh international rugby player
- Richard Parks (born 1977) Welsh international rugby player
- Jason Price (born 1977), association footballer
- Russell Robins (1932–2019) Welsh international rugby player
- Ceri Sweeney (born 1980) Welsh international rugby player
- Peter Turnbull (born 1989), first-class cricketer
- Owain Warlow (born 1987), association footballer
- Freddie Welsh (1886–1927), world champion boxer
- Martyn Williams (born 1975) Welsh international rugby player
- Gareth Wyatt (born 1977) Welsh international rugby player

== Bibliography ==
- Tobin, Patrick F. (1991). The Bridge and the Song, Some chapters in the story of Pontypridd. Bridgend: Mid Glamorgan County Libraries. ISBN 1-872430-05-8.

== See also ==
- Pontypridd (UK Parliament constituency)
- Pontypridd (Senedd constituency)
