= Llef =

- Genre: Hymn
- Written: 1890
- Meter: 8.8.8.8 (L.M.)
- Melody: Griffith Hugh Jones

Llef (in English "A Cry") is a popular Welsh hymn, written by David Charles (1803–1880) (son of David Charles (1762–1834)). The tune was composed in 1890 by Griffith Hugh Jones (Bardic name Gutyn Arfon) (1849–1919) and was written in memory of his brother Dewi.

The meter is 8-8-8-8, and it is played in the keys of D minor and E minor. English texts also commonly sung to the tune include "Bow Down Thine Ear, O Lord, and Hear", "Glorying in the Cross of Christ" and "The Day of Wrath".

The hymn was included in the soundtrack for the 1941 John Ford drama film How Green Was My Valley.

== Hymn text ==
O! Iesu mawr, rho d'anian bur
I eiddil gwan mewn anial dir,
I'w nerthu drwy'r holl rwystrau sy
Ar ddyrys daith i'r Ganaan fry.

Pob gras sydd yn yr Eglwys fawr,
Fry yn y nef, neu ar y llawr,
Caf feddu'n oll, eu meddu'n un,
Wrth feddu d'anian Di dy Hun.

Mi lyna'n dawel wrth dy draed,
Mi ganaf am rinweddau'r gwaed,
Mi garia'r groes, mi nofia'r don,
Ond cael dy anian dan fy mron.

— Welsh

O Jesus, let Thy spirit bless
This frail one in the wilderness,
To guide him through the snares of life
On Canaan's way to Thee on high.

All grace that through Thy Church doth flow,
In heaven above and here below,
All shall I have, all shall be mine,
If I but have Thy grace divine.

To Thy most holy feet I'll cling,
The virtues of Thy blood I'll sing,
The cross I'll bear, the wave I'll ride,
If Thou but with me now abide.

— An English translation
