= Côr Meibion Pontypridd =

Côr Meibion Pontypridd (Welsh: [ˈkoːr ˈmɛibjɔn ˌpɔntəˈpriːð]; "Pontypridd Male Voice Choir", literally "Choir of the Sons of Pontypridd") is a male voice choir from the Pontypridd area of the Rhondda Cynon Taf, Wales. It was formed in 1949 as a traditional Welsh singing choir and is based in Pwllgwaun, a suburb of Pontypridd.

The choir performs frequently both in Pontypridd and overseas, and has visited Poland, Ireland, the United States and Germany. It has a long-term link with Liederkranz Oberensingen, a male choir from Oberensingen, a northern suburb of Pontypridd's twin town, Nürtingen, in Baden-Württemberg, southwest Germany. It has also performed at the National Eisteddfod of Wales and took part in the HTV male choral competition. The choir is currently broadening and improving its repertoire to provide a wide-ranging concert program.

A member of the National Association of Choirs, the Welsh Association of Male Choirs and the Welsh Amateur Music Federation, it is also a past winner of the HTV Male Choral Competition and at the National Eisteddfod of Wales.

== History ==
=== Foundation and early years ===
Côr Meibion Pontypridd was founded following a meeting of a small group of men at the Educational Settlement of the town's YMCA on 19 November 1949. During its early years the choir was known as the Pontypridd Educational Settlement Male Choir. Gwilym T Jones, who at the time was a conductor and pianist, became its first conductor. He had previously conducted choirs including Cwmparc Male Voice Choir, Royal Welsh Male Choir and Treorchy and District Male Voice choir. In 1926, he began conducting for Pontypridd and District Male Voice Choir. Two years later he also began conducting for Llanharan Male Voice Choir. The choir was formed on 29 November 1949 by a group of 19 choristers under the name of "The Pontypridd Educational Settlement Male Choir". Gwilym T Jones was appointed conductor and Miss Agnes Wilson accompanist. The first concert was performed in June 1950. The following year the choir started entering competitions, and were awarded first prize at the Llanharan "Semi National" Eisteddfod, and were again placed first two weeks later at Glynneath.

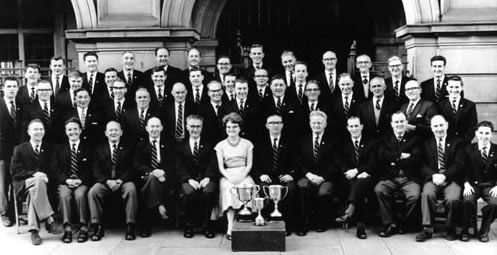
Llanharan "Semi National" Eisteddfod Côr Meibion Pontypridd awarded First place

The choir were involved in celebrations of the centenary of the composition of Hen Wlad Fy Nhadau and the bicentenary of the Old Bridge, Pontypridd.

Stuart Burrows was the guest artiste at a concert in 1959, and in the same year Harry Secombe and Geraint Evans appeared together for the first time, with W.J. Evans (Geraint's father) conducting the choir.

The choir's first concert was a private one for the Cilfynydd Old Age Pensioners in the summer of 1950. In November of that year the choir performed in the Shelley Hall at their first annual concert. A month later the choir gave the first of its 14 consecutive Christmas night concerts at the old Graig Hospital. It became a tradition that the choir was entertained to Christmas cake and tea by the Hospital Administrator. The concerts stopped with the reconstruction of the hospital in 1965. The first competition the choir entered was a semi-national eisteddfod held at Llanharan on 23 June 1951. They were awarded first prize and there was a report about them in the Pontypridd Observer.

By the time of the choir's second annual concert in November 1951, they were known as the Pontypridd and District YMCA Male Voice Choir. They made their first BBC recording in June 1956. It featured in a programme about the centenary of the composition of the music for Hen Wlad Fy Nhadau and the bicentenary of the building of the Old Bridge. A major concert was also held as part of the celebrations in the Town Hall. This was the last concert that Gwilym T Jones conducted. He died on 31 December 1956 and a plaque to his memory was unveiled in the Shelley Hall in September 1957.

Following his death, William J. Evans, father of the opera singer Sir Geraint Evans, was appointed leader of the choir in January 1957. Previously, he had formed the Handel Glee Party in 1932 that won prizes at eisteddfodau. He had also formed the Cilfynydd Philharmonic Choir in 1950. Under his guidance, Pontypridd and District YMCA Male Voice Choir's performances attracted large audiences. The choir performed alongside Sir Harry Secombe and Sir Geraint Evans at the Town Hall Theatre, Pontypridd in November 1959. They won several first prizes at semi-national eisteddfodau. The following year the choir relinquished its connection with the YMCA and its title became the Pontypridd Male Choir. However, by the time William J Evans retired as conductor in January 1964 the choir was known as Côr Meibion Pontypridd.

His successor as musical director in 1964 was Miss Joyce Durston, the choir's accompanist since 1957. Dorothy Ingram (née Davies) was appointed accompanist. Joyce had led the choir during William Evans' illness, and had previously been the conductor of the Christie Singers, a choir of 24 girls. The choir won the semi-national eisteddfod at Cardigan in May 1964, their first eisteddfod appearance under her conductorship. They went to Germany on their first foreign tour in September 1965 and gave a series of concerts in Nürtingen, the twin town of Pontypridd, as guests of the Liederkranz Oberensingen, a male voice choir. The following year, the Liederkranz made a return visit to Pontypridd.

In 1966 the choir came second in the National Eisteddfod of Wales at Newtown.

The choir's tours continued; during their early foreign tours, they received a request in August 1968 from West German Chancellor Kurt Georg Kiesinger to perform at his private palace, Bebenhausen Palace near Stuttgart. The performance was later shown on television.

=== 1970s and 80s ===
1970 was the 21st birthday of the choir and a celebration dinner at the Tabernacl Chapel was arranged in November, with patrons Sir Geraint Evans and Stuart Burrows, together with president P. Raymond Jones and vice presidents and civic dignitaries attending. A telegram of congratulation from Stuart Burrows was read out.

In 1972, Côr Meibion Pontypridd was one of twelve choirs to perform at the 1,000 voices concert at the Royal Albert Hall.

In 1973 the choir took part in the H.T.V. Male Choral Competition. Twelve choirs were in the opening knock-out round and the finalists were Cwmbach and Pontypridd. In the final in the H.T.V. Studios, Pontypridd won.

In June 1973, members of the choir were invited to appear on stage with Marlene Dietrich after she heard them sing outside the New Theatre, Cardiff, where she was appearing. Later that month they competed against twelve other male choirs from Wales, and became the first choir to win a choral competition on television. They were presented with the HTV trophy and a cheque for £250.

1973 was the choir's silver jubilee year.

In 1974 they won the competition for male choirs between 40 and 70 voices at the National Eisteddfod of Wales at Carmarthen, their first victory in this event. It was also the first time in the event's history that a choir led by a woman conductor won.

In 1975 a Polish choir, "Zzk Henjau", visited Pontypridd. Pontypridd choir visited Poland in 1976 as guests of "Zzk Henjau".

Joyce Durston resigned in November 1977, and Dorothy Davies Ingram (accompanyist since 1964) became musical director and Jonathan Gulliford succeeded her as accompanist. Dorothy had previously been a member of the Shelley Singers. She made her debut as the choir's musical director at the Festival of 1,000 Voices at the Afan Lido, Aberavon in December 1977.

The choir won the Knight of St. David Memorial Bowl at the Rhymney Valley Eisteddfod, and retained it the following year.

In 1989 Dorothy became the first woman to conduct the 1,000 voices in the Royal Albert Hall and after 11 years as conductor to Côr Meibion Pontypridd, changed her role to become deputy conductor and accompanist, with Jonathan Gulliford becoming director of music.

1989 was also the choir's 40th anniversary. As part of the celebrations the choir appeared in a gala concert with Liederkranz Obersingen of Nürtingen in July at the Hawthorn Leisure Centre. Also in 1989, Dorothy Davies-Ingram decided to change her role, and became both deputy conductor and accompanist, while Jonathan Gulliford became director of music.

=== Recent times ===
The John Tree Award scheme, contributed to by R.T.J. Tree, choir president, was launched in 1991. The objective of the scheme is to link local schools and the choir. Annual prizes are awarded to musicians/singers at Pontypridd schools, based on talent. Award winners take part in the choir's annual celebrity concert.

More recently, Côr Meibion Pontypridd have participated in tours. They travelled to the United States in the year of their 50th anniversary in 1999 and returned four years later. They hosted a five-day visit by Liederkranz Obersingen in 2005 to celebrate a 40-year history of friendship between the two choirs. In 2008 the choir staged successful concerts in Cyprus, and this year they will again visit Nürtingen.
