= 6th Senedd =

←	5th Assembly	7th Senedd	→
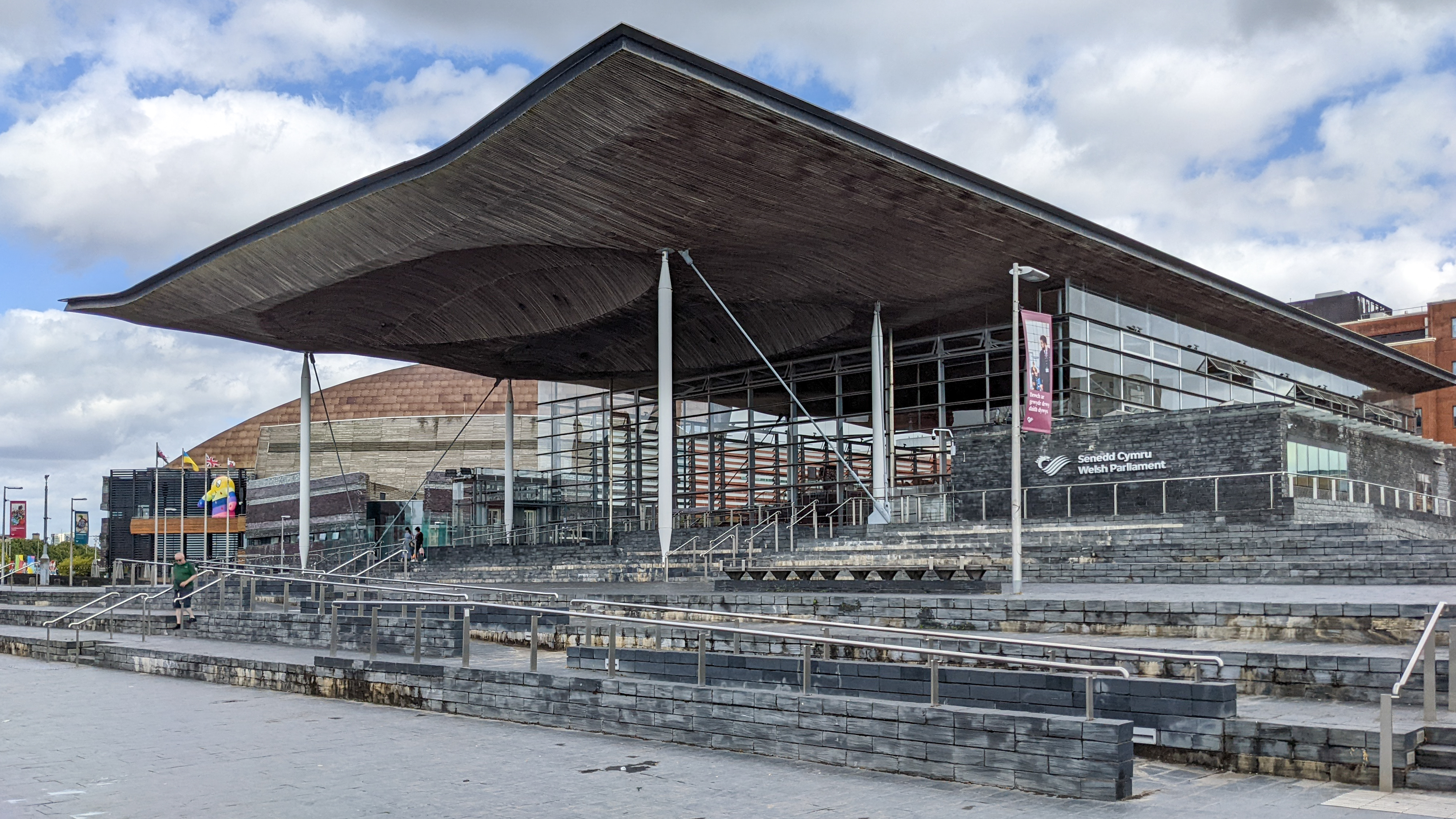
- The Senedd building in 2022

Overview
- Legislative body: Senedd
- Jurisdiction: Wales, United Kingdom
- Meeting place: Senedd building, Cardiff
- Term: 6 May 2021 – 7 May 2026 (Note: dissolved on 8 April 2026)
- Election: 2021 Senedd election
- Government: Second Drakeford government (2021–2024); Gething government (March 2024 – August 2024); Eluned Morgan government (August 2024 – May 2026)
- Opposition: Fourth Shadow Cabinet of Andrew RT Davies (2021–2024); Shadow Cabinet of Darren Millar (2024–2026); Vacant (2026–)
- Members: 60
- Llywydd (presiding officer): Elin Jones (2021–2026)
- First Minister: Mark Drakeford (2021–2024); Vaughan Gething (March 2024 – August 2024); Eluned Morgan (August 2024 – 2026)

This is a list of members of the Senedd elected to the sixth Senedd at the 2021 election. There were a total of 60 members elected, 40 were elected from first past the post constituencies with a further 20 members being returned from five regions, each electing four members through mixed-member proportional representation. In between elections, members of the legislature may not necessarily be of the same party or the same candidate elected in 2021.

== Composition of the Senedd ==
Party		2021 election	Prior to 2026 election
•	Labour	30 (Note: Includes 16 MSs sponsored by the Co-operative Party, who are designated Labour and Co-operative.)	29 (Note: Includes 16 MSs sponsored by the Co-operative Party, who are designated Labour and Co-operative.)
	Conservative	16	13
	Plaid Cymru	13	13
	Liberal Democrats	1	1
	Reform UK	0	2
	Independent	0	2
Total		60	60

Government parties denoted with bullets (•)

== Senedd members by party following 2021 election ==
Siambr diagram following the 2021 election (left) and prior to the 2026 election (right)

== Senedd members by constituency and region following 2021 election ==
Constituency members
Seat	Member	Portrait	Party	First elected
Aberavon	David Rees		Labour	2011
Aberconwy	Janet Finch-Saunders		Conservative	2011
Alyn and Deeside	Jack Sargeant		Labour	2018
Arfon	Siân Gwenllian		Plaid Cymru	2016
Blaenau Gwent	Alun Davies		Labour Co-op	2007
Brecon and Radnorshire	James Evans		Reform UK (originally elected with the Conservative Party)	2021
Bridgend	Sarah Murphy		Labour Co-op	2021
Caerphilly	Lindsay Whittle		Plaid Cymru	2025
Cardiff Central	Jenny Rathbone		Labour	2011
Cardiff North	Julie Morgan		Labour	2011
Cardiff South and Penarth	Vaughan Gething		Labour Co-op	2011
Cardiff West	Mark Drakeford		Labour	2011
Carmarthen East and Dinefwr	Adam Price		Plaid Cymru	2016
Carmarthen West and South Pembrokeshire	Samuel Kurtz		Conservative	2021
Ceredigion	Elin Jones		Plaid Cymru	1999
Clwyd South	Ken Skates		Labour	2011
Clwyd West	Darren Millar		Conservative	2007
Cynon Valley	Vikki Howells		Labour Co-op	2016
Delyn	Hannah Blythyn		Labour Co-op	2016
Dwyfor Meirionnydd	Mabon ap Gwynfor		Plaid Cymru	2021
Gower	Rebecca Evans		Labour Co-op	2011
Islwyn	Rhianon Passmore		Labour Co-op	2016
Llanelli	Lee Waters		Labour Co-op	2016
Merthyr Tydfil and Rhymney	Dawn Bowden		Labour	2016
Monmouth	Peter Fox		Conservative	2021
Montgomeryshire	Russell George		Independent (originally elected with the Conservative Party)	2011
Neath	Jeremy Miles		Labour Co-op	2016
Newport East	John Griffiths		Labour Co-op	1999
Newport West	Jayne Bryant		Labour	2016
Ogmore	Huw Irranca-Davies		Labour Co-op	2016
Pontypridd	Mick Antoniw		Labour Co-op	2011
Preseli Pembrokeshire	Paul Davies		Conservative	2007
Rhondda	Buffy Williams		Labour	2021
Swansea East	Mike Hedges		Labour	2011
Swansea West	Julie James		Labour	2011
Torfaen	Lynne Neagle		Labour Co-op	1999
Vale of Clwyd	Gareth Davies		Conservative	2021
Vale of Glamorgan	Jane Hutt		Labour	1999
Wrexham	Lesley Griffiths		Labour	2007
Ynys Môn	Rhun ap Iorwerth		Plaid Cymru	2013

Regional members
Region	Member	Portrait	Party	First elected
Mid and West Wales	Eluned Morgan		Labour	2016
Mid and West Wales	Cefin Campbell		Plaid Cymru	2021
Mid and West Wales	Jane Dodds		Liberal Democrats	2021
Mid and West Wales	Joyce Watson		Labour	2007
North Wales	Llŷr Gruffydd		Plaid Cymru	2011
North Wales	Mark Isherwood		Conservative	2003
North Wales	Sam Rowlands		Conservative	2021
North Wales	Carolyn Thomas		Labour Co-op	2021
South Wales Central	Andrew R. T. Davies		Conservative	2007
South Wales Central	Heledd Fychan		Plaid Cymru	2021
South Wales Central	Joel James		Conservative	2021
South Wales Central	Rhys ab Owen		Independent (originally elected with Plaid Cymru)	2021
South Wales East	Natasha Asghar		Conservative	2021
South Wales East	Peredur Owen Griffiths		Plaid Cymru	2021
South Wales East	Delyth Jewell		Plaid Cymru	2019
South Wales East	Laura Anne Jones		Reform UK (originally elected with the Conservative Party)	2003
South Wales West	Luke Fletcher		Plaid Cymru	2021
South Wales West	Tom Giffard		Conservative	2021
South Wales West	Altaf Hussain		Conservative	2015
South Wales West	Sioned Williams		Plaid Cymru	2021

== See also ==
- 1999 National Assembly for Wales election and Members of the 1st National Assembly for Wales
- 2003 National Assembly for Wales election and Members of the 2nd National Assembly for Wales
- 2007 National Assembly for Wales election and Members of the 3rd National Assembly for Wales
- 2011 National Assembly for Wales election and Members of the 4th National Assembly for Wales
- 2016 National Assembly for Wales election and Members of the 5th National Assembly for Wales
- 2021 Senedd election
- List of by-elections to the Senedd and List of elections to the Senedd
- Senedd constituencies and electoral regions
