= 5th National Assembly for Wales =

5th Assembly/Senedd
| ← | 4th Assembly | 6th Senedd | → |
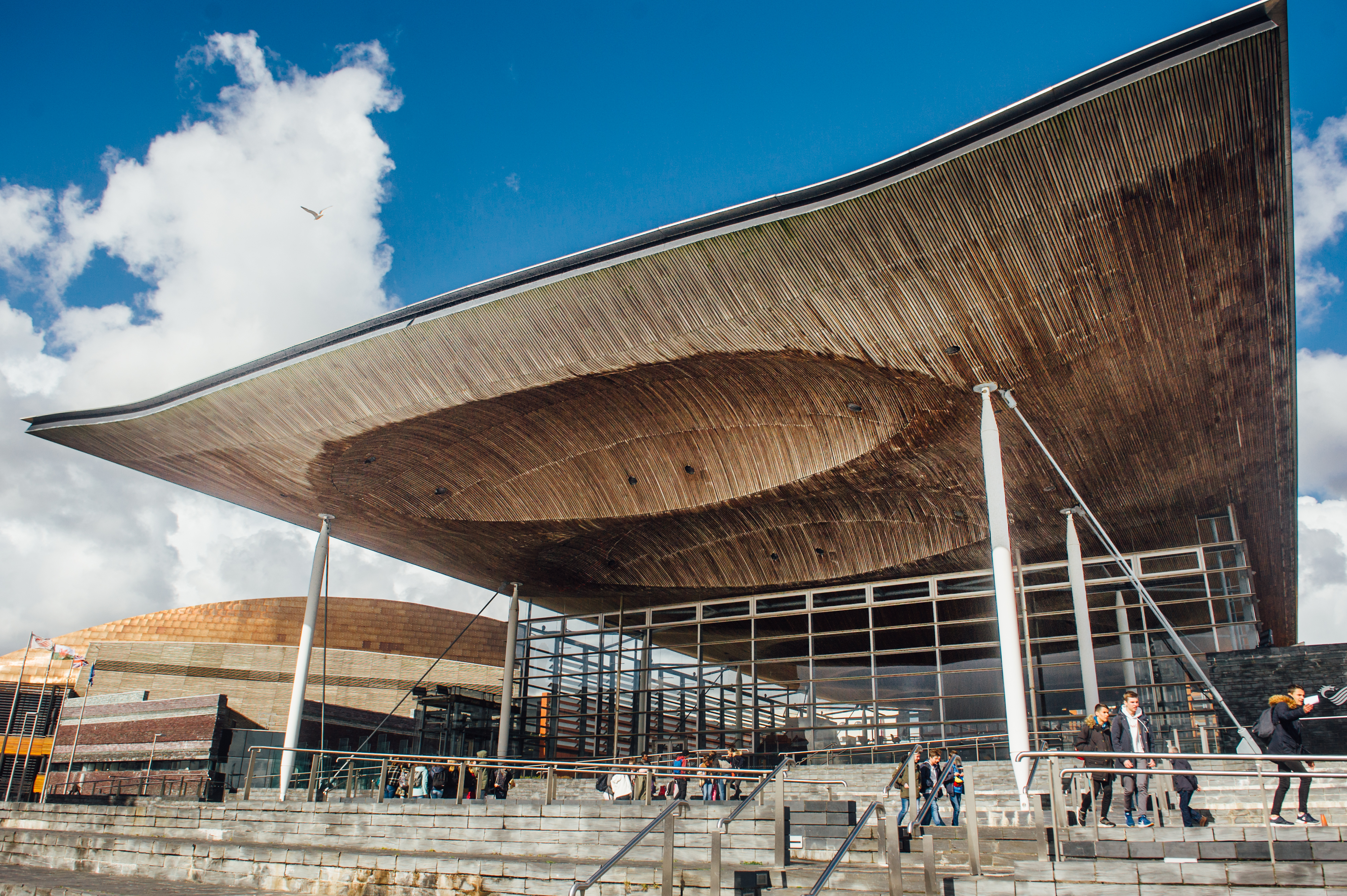
- The Welsh Assembly Building (Senedd) in 2019

Overview
- Legislative body: National Assembly for Wales (Senedd from 2020)
- Jurisdiction: Wales, United Kingdom
- Meeting place: Senedd building, Cardiff
- Term: 5 May 2016 – 6 May 2021
- Election: 2016 National Assembly for Wales election
- Government: Third Jones government (2016–18); First Drakeford government (2018–21)
- Opposition: Shadow Cabinet of Leanne Wood (2016); Vacant (2016–17); Second Shadow Cabinet of Andrew R. T. Davies (2017–18); Shadow Cabinet of Paul Davies (2018–21); Third Shadow Cabinet of Andrew RT Davies (2021)
- Members: 60
- Llywydd (presiding officer): Rosemary Butler (2016); Elin Jones (2016–21)
- First Minister: Carwyn Jones (2016–18); Mark Drakeford (2018–21)

This is a list of Assembly Members (AMs; Welsh: Aelodau'r Cynulliad, ACau) elected to the fifth National Assembly for Wales at the 2016 election. In May 2020, the representatives were renamed to Members of the Senedd (MSs; Welsh: Aelodau o'r Senedd; ASau) in the fifth Senedd, they would be known as the fifth Senedd for the remainder of their term. From the 2021 election members would be elected under this new title of Senedd. There are a total of 60 members elected, 40 were elected from first past the post constituencies with a further 20 members being returned from five regions, each electing four AMs through mixed-member proportional representation. In between elections, members of the legislature may not necessarily be of the same party or the same candidate elected in 2016.

== Composition of the Assembly (Senedd from May 2020) ==
| Party | | 2016 election | Prior to 2021 election |
|---|---|---|---|
| • | Labour | 29 (Note: Includes 13 MSs sponsored by the Co-operative Party, who are designated Labour and Co-operative.) | 29 (Note: Includes 13 MSs sponsored by the Co-operative Party, who are designated Labour and Co-operative.) |
| | Plaid Cymru | 12 | 10 |
| | Conservative | 11 | 10 |
| | Abolish the Welsh Assembly Party | N/A | 2 |
| • | Liberal Democrats | 1 | 1 |
| | UKIP | 7 | 1 |
| | Propel | N/A | 1 |
| | Independent | 0 | 3 |
| | Independent Group for Reform | N/A | 3 |
| Total | | 60 | 60 |

Government parties denoted with bullets (•)

== Assembly members by party following 2016 election (5th Assembly) ==
Siambr diagram following the 2016 election

Members by party
| Party | Assembly leader | Name | Constituency or region |
|---|---|---|---|
| Labour (29) | Carwyn Jones | Mick Antoniw | Pontypridd |
| Labour (29) | Carwyn Jones | Hannah Blythyn | Delyn |
| Labour (29) | Carwyn Jones | Dawn Bowden | Merthyr Tydfil and Rhymney |
| Labour (29) | Carwyn Jones | Jayne Bryant | Newport West |
| Labour (29) | Carwyn Jones | Hefin David | Caerphilly |
| Labour (29) | Carwyn Jones | Alun Davies | Blaenau Gwent |
| Labour (29) | Carwyn Jones | Mark Drakeford | Cardiff West |
| Labour (29) | Carwyn Jones | Rebecca Evans | Gower |
| Labour (29) | Carwyn Jones | Vaughan Gething | Cardiff South and Penarth |
| Labour (29) | Carwyn Jones | John Griffiths | Newport East |
| Labour (29) | Carwyn Jones | Lesley Griffiths | Wrexham |
| Labour (29) | Carwyn Jones | Mike Hedges | Swansea East |
| Labour (29) | Carwyn Jones | Vikki Howells | Cynon Valley |
| Labour (29) | Carwyn Jones | Jane Hutt | Vale of Glamorgan |
| Labour (29) | Carwyn Jones | Huw Irranca-Davies | Ogmore |
| Labour (29) | Carwyn Jones | Julie James | Swansea West |
| Labour (29) | Carwyn Jones | Ann Jones | Vale of Clwyd |
| Labour (29) | Carwyn Jones | Carwyn Jones | Bridgend |
| Labour (29) | Carwyn Jones | Jeremy Miles | Neath |
| Labour (29) | Carwyn Jones | Baroness Eluned Morgan | Mid and West Wales |
| Labour (29) | Carwyn Jones | Julie Morgan | Cardiff North |
| Labour (29) | Carwyn Jones | Lynne Neagle | Torfaen |
| Labour (29) | Carwyn Jones | Rhianon Passmore | Islwyn |
| Labour (29) | Carwyn Jones | Jenny Rathbone | Cardiff Central |
| Labour (29) | Carwyn Jones | David Rees | Aberavon |
| Labour (29) | Carwyn Jones | Carl Sargeant | Alyn and Deeside |
| Labour (29) | Carwyn Jones | Ken Skates | Clwyd South |
| Labour (29) | Carwyn Jones | Lee Waters | Llanelli |
| Labour (29) | Carwyn Jones | Joyce Watson | Mid and West Wales |
| Plaid Cymru (12) | Leanne Wood | Rhun ap Iorwerth | Ynys Môn |
| Plaid Cymru (12) | Leanne Wood | Lord Dafydd Elis-Thomas | Dwyfor Meirionnydd |
| Plaid Cymru (12) | Leanne Wood | Siân Gwenllian | Arfon |
| Plaid Cymru (12) | Leanne Wood | Llyr Huws Gruffydd | North Wales |
| Plaid Cymru (12) | Leanne Wood | Bethan Jenkins | South Wales West |
| Plaid Cymru (12) | Leanne Wood | Elin Jones | Ceredigion |
| Plaid Cymru (12) | Leanne Wood | Steffan Lewis | South Wales East |
| Plaid Cymru (12) | Leanne Wood | Dai Lloyd | South Wales West |
| Plaid Cymru (12) | Leanne Wood | Neil McEvoy | South Wales Central |
| Plaid Cymru (12) | Leanne Wood | Adam Price | Carmarthen East and Dinefwr |
| Plaid Cymru (12) | Leanne Wood | Simon Thomas | Mid and es |
| Plaid Cymru (12) | Leanne Wood | Leanne Wood | Rhondda |
| Conservative Party (11) | Andrew R. T. Davies | Mohammad Asghar | South Wales East |
| Conservative Party (11) | Andrew R. T. Davies | Angela Burns | Carmarthen West and South Pembrokeshire |
| Conservative Party (11) | Andrew R. T. Davies | Andrew R. T. Davies | South Wales Central |
| Conservative Party (11) | Andrew R. T. Davies | Paul Davies | Preseli Pembrokeshire |
| Conservative Party (11) | Andrew R. T. Davies | Suzy Davies | South Wales West |
| Conservative Party (11) | Andrew R. T. Davies | Janet Finch-Saunders | Aberconwy |
| Conservative Party (11) | Andrew R. T. Davies | Russell George | Montgomeryshire |
| Conservative Party (11) | Andrew R. T. Davies | Mark Isherwood | North Wales |
| Conservative Party (11) | Andrew R. T. Davies | David Melding | South Wales Central |
| Conservative Party (11) | Andrew R. T. Davies | Darren Millar | Clwyd West |
| Conservative Party (11) | Andrew R. T. Davies | Nick Ramsay | Monmouth |
| UKIP (7) | Nathan Gill | Gareth Bennett | South Wales Central |
| UKIP (7) | Nathan Gill | Michelle Brown | North Wales |
| UKIP (7) | Nathan Gill | Nathan Gill | North Wales |
| UKIP (7) | Nathan Gill | Neil Hamilton | Mid and West Wales |
| UKIP (7) | Nathan Gill | Caroline Jones | South Wales West |
| UKIP (7) | Nathan Gill | Mark Reckless | South Wales East |
| UKIP (7) | Nathan Gill | David Rowlands | South Wales East |
| Liberal Democrats (1) | Kirsty Williams | Kirsty Williams | Brecon and Radnorshire |

== Assembly members by constituency and region following 2016 election (5th Assembly) ==
Constituency members
| Seat | Member | Portrait | Party | First elected |
|---|---|---|---|---|
| Aberavon | David Rees | | Labour | 2011 |
| Aberconwy | Janet Finch-Saunders | | Conservative | 2011 |
| Alyn and Deeside | Carl Sargeant | | Labour | 2003 |
| Arfon | Siân Gwenllian | | Plaid Cymru | 2016 |
| Blaenau Gwent | Alun Davies | | Labour Co-op | 2007 |
| Brecon and Radnorshire | Kirsty Williams | | Liberal Democrats | 1999 |
| Bridgend | Carwyn Jones | | Labour | 1999 |
| Caerphilly | Hefin David | | Labour | 2016 |
| Cardiff Central | Jenny Rathbone | | Labour | 2011 |
| Cardiff North | Julie Morgan | | Labour | 2011 |
| Cardiff South and Penarth | Vaughan Gething | | Labour Co-op | 2011 |
| Cardiff West | Mark Drakeford | | Labour | 2011 |
| Carmarthen East and Dinefwr | Adam Price | | Plaid Cymru | 2016 |
| Carmarthen West and South Pembrokeshire | Angela Burns | | Conservative | 2007 |
| Ceredigion | Elin Jones | | Plaid Cymru | 1999 |
| Clwyd South | Ken Skates | | Labour | 2011 |
| Clwyd West | Darren Millar | | Conservative | 2007 |
| Cynon Valley | Vikki Howells | | Labour Co-op | 2016 |
| Delyn | Hannah Blythyn | | Labour Co-op | 2016 |
| Dwyfor Meirionnydd | Dafydd Elis-Thomas | | Plaid Cymru | 1999 |
| Gower | Rebecca Evans | | Labour Co-op | 2011 |
| Islwyn | Rhianon Passmore | | Labour Co-op | 2016 |
| Llanelli | Lee Waters | | Labour Co-op | 2016 |
| Merthyr Tydfil and Rhymney | Dawn Bowden | | Labour | 2016 |
| Monmouth | Nick Ramsay | | Conservative | 2007 |
| Montgomeryshire | Russell George | | Conservative | 2011 |
| Neath | Jeremy Miles | | Labour Co-op | 2016 |
| Newport East | John Griffiths | | Labour Co-op | 1999 |
| Newport West | Jayne Bryant | | Labour | 2016 |
| Ogmore | Huw Irranca-Davies | | Labour Co-op | 2016 |
| Pontypridd | Mick Antoniw | | Labour Co-op | 2011 |
| Preseli Pembrokeshire | Paul Davies | | Conservative | 2007 |
| Rhondda | Leanne Wood | | Plaid Cymru | 2003 |
| Swansea East | Mike Hedges | | Labour | 2011 |
| Swansea West | Julie James | | Labour | 2011 |
| Torfaen | Lynne Neagle | | Labour Co-op | 1999 |
| Vale of Clwyd | Ann Jones | | Labour Co-op | 1999 |
| Vale of Glamorgan | Jane Hutt | | Labour | 1999 |
| Wrexham | Lesley Griffiths | | Labour | 2007 |
| Ynys Môn | Rhun ap Iorwerth | | Plaid Cymru | 2013 |

Regional members
| Region | Member | Portrait | Party | First elected |
|---|---|---|---|---|
| Mid and West Wales | Neil Hamilton | | UKIP | 2016 |
| Mid and West Wales | Eluned Morgan | | Labour | 2016 |
| Mid and West Wales | Simon Thomas | | Plaid Cymru | 2011 |
| Mid and West Wales | Joyce Watson | | Labour | 2007 |
| North Wales | Michelle Brown | | UKIP | 2016 |
| North Wales | Nathan Gill | | UKIP | 2016 |
| North Wales | Llŷr Gruffydd | | Plaid Cymru | 2011 |
| North Wales | Mark Isherwood | | Conservative | 2003 |
| South Wales Central | Gareth Bennett | | UKIP | 2016 |
| South Wales Central | Andrew R. T. Davies | | Conservative | 2007 |
| South Wales Central | Neil McEvoy | | Plaid Cymru | 2016 |
| South Wales Central | David Melding | | Conservative | 1999 |
| South Wales East | Mohammad Asghar | | Conservative | 2007 |
| South Wales East | Steffan Lewis | | Plaid Cymru | 2016 |
| South Wales East | Mark Reckless | | UKIP | 2016 |
| South Wales East | David Rowlands | | UKIP | 2016 |
| South Wales West | Suzy Davies | | Conservative | 2011 |
| South Wales West | Bethan Jenkins | | Plaid Cymru | 2007 |
| South Wales West | Caroline Jones | | UKIP | 2016 |
| South Wales West | Dai Lloyd | | Plaid Cymru | 2016 |

== Changes between elections ==
=== Government formation ===
The May 2016 election saw the biggest ever change in the Assembly's composition. Labour dropped from 30 to 29 seats, and Plaid Cymru moved from 11 to 12 seats. The Conservatives lost 3 seats, moving from 14 seats to 11, while the Liberal Democrats dropped from 5 to 1 seat. UKIP, who had not previously had representation, gained seven AMs.

In the initial ballot for First Minister, Plaid Cymru's Leanne Wood and Labour's Carwyn Jones each gained 29 votes; a week of talks were then held. A document was produced after Plaid Cymru–Labour talks entitled "Moving Wales Forward", which detailed policy concessions in exchange for allowing Carwyn Jones to become First Minister. Labour appointed Kirsty Williams as Education Secretary, so that the minority government was a coalition between Welsh Labour and the Welsh Liberal Democrats. Plaid Cymru, the Conservatives and UKIP formed opposition groups.

In 2018, Mark Drakeford was elected to the leadership of the Welsh Labour Party and became first minister, leading a coalition government with the Liberal Democrats and an independent member.

In May 2020, the representatives were renamed to Members of the Senedd in the fifth Senedd, they would be known by this title for the remainder of their term. From the 2021 election members would be elected under this new title.

=== Changes in composition of the Assembly (now Senedd) between elections ===
| Date | Member | Reason for change | Original designation | Constituency/region | New designation | Notes |
|---|---|---|---|---|---|---|
| 17 August 2016 | Nathan Gill | CD | UKIP | North Wales | Independent | Left the Assembly group. He remained a member of the party and its leader in Wales, until Neil Hamilton was made Wales leader in September 2016. |
| 14 October 2016 | Dafydd Elis-Thomas | CD | Plaid Cymru | Dwyfor Meirionnydd | Independent | Quit the Plaid Cymru group on 14 October 2016. As a result of the defection, Leanne Wood lost the title of leader of the opposition. Two months later, he pledged to back the Welsh Labour-led Government, giving the new government an overall majority in the Welsh Assembly. |
| 19 March 2018 | Neil McEvoy | Suspended | Plaid Cymru | South Wales Central | Independent | Was suspended by the Plaid Cymru group after a tribunal found him guilty of bullying in his other role as a councillor for Cardiff. He was later expelled from Plaid Cymru. In February 2020 he announced that he was forming a new political party, the Welsh National Party, and that he had registered the name with the Electoral Commission. The launch of the party was planned for April 2020. |
| 6 April 2017 | Mark Reckless | CD | UKIP | South Wales East | Conservative | Upon leaving, he said, "I leave UKIP positively, having achieved our joint aim, a successful referendum to leave the EU". |
| 3 November 2017 | Carl Sargeant | Suspended | Labour | Alyn and Deeside | Independent | Sargeant was suspended from Welsh Labour following allegations about his personal conduct. |
| 7 November 2017 - 6 February 2018 | Carl Sargeant | Death | Independent | Alyn and Deeside | Labour | On 7 November 2017, Sargeant was found dead. A by-election was held in his former constituency of Alyn and Deeside on 6 February 2018 to choose a successor; this was won by the Labour candidate, his son, Jack. |
| 27 December 2017 | Nathan Gill | Resigned | Independent | North Wales | Independent | On 27 December 2017 it was announced that he had resigned as an AM. As 3rd on UKIP's list for the North Wales region, Mandy Jones was sworn in as a Member on 29 December 2017. On 9 January UKIP Wales announced that she would not be joining the UKIP group in the Assembly, due to employing members of other parties in her office. |
| 25 July 2018 | Simon Thomas | Resigned | Plaid Cymru | Mid and West Wales | Plaid Cymru | Thomas resigned following his arrest for possession of indecent images. Helen Mary Jones replaced Thomas as a Member in August 2018. |
| 12 September 2018 | Caroline Jones | CD | UKIP | South Wales West | Brexit Party | Resigned as a member of UKIP and from UKIP's group on 12 September 2018. |
| 20 November 2018 | Jenny Rathbone | Suspended | Labour | Cardiff Central | Independent | Suspended over remarks about Jewish people. She was later re-admitted. |
| 9 January 2019 | Jenny Rathbone | Re-admitted | Independent | Cardiff Central | Labour | Suspended over remarks about Jewish people. She was later re-admitted. |
| 11 January 2019 | Steffan Lewis | Death | Plaid Cymru | South Wales East | Plaid Cymru | Died of bowel cancer on 11 January 2019 and was replaced by Delyth Jewell. |
| 26 March 2019 | Michelle Brown | CD | UKIP | North Wales | Independent | Left the UKIP group in March 2019, to sit as an independent. |
| 14 April 2019 | Mark Reckless | CD | Conservative | South Wales East | Independent | On 14 April 2019, Reckless left the Conservative Party Group over the party's failure to deliver Brexit. He then sat as an independent member. |
| 15 May 2019 | Mark Reckless | CD | Independent | South Wales East | Brexit Party | Reckless joined the new Brexit Party group in May 2019. |
| 10 November 2019 | Gareth Bennett | CD | UKIP | South Wales Central | Independent | Left the UKIP group in November 2019 to sit as an independent, leaving Neil Hamilton as the party's last remaining member on the Assembly. |
| 2 January 2020 | Nick Ramsay | Suspended | Conservative | Monmouth | Independent | Arrested on 1 January 2020 and suspended from the Conservative group the following day. He was later readmitted. |
| 16 June 2020 | Mohammad Asghar | Death | Conservative | South Wales East | Conservative | Died on 16 June 2020 and was replaced by Laura Ann Jones. |
| 24 June 2020 | Gareth Bennett | CD | Independent | South Wales Central | Abolish | Joined the Abolish the Welsh Assembly Party on 24 June 2020. |
| 15 July 2020 | Nick Ramsay | Re-admitted | Independent | Monmouth | Conservative | Readmitted having been arrested on 1 January 2020 and suspended from the Conservative group the following day. |
| 18 August 2020 | Caroline Jones | CD | Brexit Party | South Wales West | Independent | Left Brexit Party and sits as Independent member from 18 August 2020 due to the newly adopted anti-devolution stance the Party had adopted. |
| 16 October 2020 | Mandy Jones | CD | Brexit Party | North Wales | Independent | Jones and Rowlands started a new independent group in the Senedd, Independent Alliance for Reform with Caroline Jones, focusing on reform rather than abolition. |
| 16 October 2020 | David Rowlands | CD | Brexit Party | South Wales East | Independent | Jones and Rowlands started a new independent group in the Senedd, Independent Alliance for Reform with Caroline Jones, focusing on reform rather than abolition. |
| 19 October 2020 | Mark Reckless | CD | Brexit Party | South Wales East | Abolish | Joined the Abolish the Welsh Assembly Party on 19 October 2020. |
| 19 January 2021 | Alun Davies | Suspended | Labour | Blaenau Gwent | Independent | Suspended pending investigation after allegedly being involved in alcohol drinking on the Senedd estate, that could have broken COVID restrictions. He was later re-admitted. |
| 23 February 2021 | Alun Davies | Re-admitted | Independent | Blaenau Gwent | Labour | Suspended pending investigation after allegedly being involved in alcohol drinking on the Senedd estate, that could have broken COVID restrictions. He was later re-admitted. |
| 29 March 2021 | Nick Ramsay | CD | Conservative | Monmouth | Independent | Resigned to stand as independent ahead of forthcoming election. |

CD=Changed designation

== Senedd members by party prior to 2021 election (5th Senedd) ==
Siambr diagram prior to the 2021 election.

Members by party
| Party | Senedd leader | Name | Constituency or region |
|---|---|---|---|
| Labour (29) | Mark Drakeford | Mick Antoniw | Pontypridd |
| Labour (29) | Mark Drakeford | Hannah Blythyn | Delyn |
| Labour (29) | Mark Drakeford | Dawn Bowden | Merthyr Tydfil and Rhymney |
| Labour (29) | Mark Drakeford | Jayne Bryant | Newport West |
| Labour (29) | Mark Drakeford | Hefin David | Caerphilly |
| Labour (29) | Mark Drakeford | Alun Davies | Blaenau Gwent |
| Labour (29) | Mark Drakeford | Mark Drakeford | Cardiff West |
| Labour (29) | Mark Drakeford | Rebecca Evans | Gower |
| Labour (29) | Mark Drakeford | Vaughan Gething | Cardiff South and Penarth |
| Labour (29) | Mark Drakeford | John Griffiths | Newport East |
| Labour (29) | Mark Drakeford | Lesley Griffiths | Wrexham |
| Labour (29) | Mark Drakeford | Mike Hedges | Swansea East |
| Labour (29) | Mark Drakeford | Vikki Howells | Cynon Valley |
| Labour (29) | Mark Drakeford | Jane Hutt | Vale of Glamorgan |
| Labour (29) | Mark Drakeford | Huw Irranca-Davies | Ogmore |
| Labour (29) | Mark Drakeford | Julie James | Swansea West |
| Labour (29) | Mark Drakeford | Ann Jones | Vale of Clwyd |
| Labour (29) | Mark Drakeford | Carwyn Jones | Bridgend |
| Labour (29) | Mark Drakeford | Jeremy Miles | Neath |
| Labour (29) | Mark Drakeford | Baroness Eluned Morgan | Mid and West Wales |
| Labour (29) | Mark Drakeford | Julie Morgan | Cardiff North |
| Labour (29) | Mark Drakeford | Lynne Neagle | Torfaen |
| Labour (29) | Mark Drakeford | Rhianon Passmore | Islwyn |
| Labour (29) | Mark Drakeford | Jenny Rathbone | Cardiff Central |
| Labour (29) | Mark Drakeford | David Rees | Aberavon |
| Labour (29) | Mark Drakeford | Jack Sargeant | Alyn and Deeside |
| Labour (29) | Mark Drakeford | Ken Skates | Clwyd South |
| Labour (29) | Mark Drakeford | Lee Waters | Llanelli |
| Labour (29) | Mark Drakeford | Joyce Watson | Mid and West Wales |
| Conservative Party (10) | Andrew R. T. Davies | Laura Anne Jones | South Wales East |
| Conservative Party (10) | Andrew R. T. Davies | Angela Burns | Carmarthen West and South Pembrokeshire |
| Conservative Party (10) | Andrew R. T. Davies | Andrew R. T. Davies | South Wales Central |
| Conservative Party (10) | Andrew R. T. Davies | Paul Davies | Preseli Pembrokeshire |
| Conservative Party (10) | Andrew R. T. Davies | Suzy Davies | South Wales West |
| Conservative Party (10) | Andrew R. T. Davies | Janet Finch-Saunders | Aberconwy |
| Conservative Party (10) | Andrew R. T. Davies | Russell George | Montgomeryshire |
| Conservative Party (10) | Andrew R. T. Davies | Mark Isherwood | North Wales |
| Conservative Party (10) | Andrew R. T. Davies | David Melding | South Wales Central |
| Conservative Party (10) | Andrew R. T. Davies | Darren Millar | Clwyd West |
| Plaid Cymru (10) | Adam Price | Rhun ap Iorwerth | Ynys Môn |
| Plaid Cymru (10) | Adam Price | Siân Gwenllian | Arfon |
| Plaid Cymru (10) | Adam Price | Llyr Huws Gruffydd | North Wales |
| Plaid Cymru (10) | Adam Price | Bethan Sayed | South Wales West |
| Plaid Cymru (10) | Adam Price | Elin Jones | Ceredigion |
| Plaid Cymru (10) | Adam Price | Helen Mary Jones | Mid and West Wales |
| Plaid Cymru (10) | Adam Price | Delyth Jewell | South Wales East |
| Plaid Cymru (10) | Adam Price | Dai Lloyd | South Wales West |
| Plaid Cymru (10) | Adam Price | Adam Price | Carmarthen East and Dinefwr |
| Plaid Cymru (10) | Adam Price | Leanne Wood | Rhondda |
| Abolish the Welsh Assembly Party (2) | Richard Suchorzewski | Gareth Bennett | South Wales Central |
| Abolish the Welsh Assembly Party (2) | Richard Suchorzewski | Mark Reckless | South Wales East |
| Liberal Democrats (1) | Kirsty Williams | Kirsty Williams | Brecon and Radnorshire |
| UKIP (1) | Neil Hamilton | Neil Hamilton | Mid and West Wales |
| Propel (1) | Neil McEvoy | Neil McEvoy | South Wales Central |
| Independent (3) | N/A | Michelle Brown | North Wales |
| Independent (3) | N/A | Dafydd Elis-Thomas | Dwyfor Meirionnydd |
| Independent (3) | N/A | Nick Ramsay | Monmouth |
| Group: Independent Alliance for Reform (3) | Caroline Jones | Caroline Jones | South Wales West |
| Group: Independent Alliance for Reform (3) | Caroline Jones | David Rowlands | South Wales East |
| Group: Independent Alliance for Reform (3) | Caroline Jones | Mandy Jones | North Wales |

== Senedd members elected by constituency and region prior to 2021 election (5th Senedd) ==
Constituency members
| Seat | Member | Portrait | Party | First elected |
|---|---|---|---|---|
| Aberavon | David Rees | | Labour | 2011 |
| Aberconwy | Janet Finch-Saunders | | Conservative | 2011 |
| Alyn and Deeside | Jack Sargeant | | Labour | 2018 |
| Arfon | Siân Gwenllian | | Plaid Cymru | 2016 |
| Blaenau Gwent | Alun Davies | | Labour Co-op | 2007 |
| Brecon and Radnorshire | Kirsty Williams | | Liberal Democrats | 1999 |
| Bridgend | Carwyn Jones | | Labour | 1999 |
| Caerphilly | Hefin David | | Labour | 2016 |
| Cardiff Central | Jenny Rathbone | | Labour | 2011 |
| Cardiff North | Julie Morgan | | Labour | 2011 |
| Cardiff South and Penarth | Vaughan Gething | | Labour Co-op | 2011 |
| Cardiff West | Mark Drakeford | | Labour | 2011 |
| Carmarthen East and Dinefwr | Adam Price | | Plaid Cymru | 2016 |
| Carmarthen West and South Pembrokeshire | Angela Burns | | Conservative | 2007 |
| Ceredigion | Elin Jones | | Plaid Cymru | 1999 |
| Clwyd South | Ken Skates | | Labour | 2011 |
| Clwyd West | Darren Millar | | Conservative | 2007 |
| Cynon Valley | Vikki Howells | | Labour Co-op | 2016 |
| Delyn | Hannah Blythyn | | Labour Co-op | 2016 |
| Dwyfor Meirionnydd | Dafydd Elis-Thomas | | Independent | 1999 |
| Gower | Rebecca Evans | | Labour Co-op | 2011 |
| Islwyn | Rhianon Passmore | | Labour Co-op | 2016 |
| Llanelli | Lee Waters | | Labour Co-op | 2016 |
| Merthyr Tydfil and Rhymney | Dawn Bowden | | Labour | 2016 |
| Monmouth | Nick Ramsay | | Independent | 2007 |
| Montgomeryshire | Russell George | | Conservative | 2011 |
| Neath | Jeremy Miles | | Labour Co-op | 2016 |
| Newport East | John Griffiths | | Labour Co-op | 1999 |
| Newport West | Jayne Bryant | | Labour | 2016 |
| Ogmore | Huw Irranca-Davies | | Labour Co-op | 2016 |
| Pontypridd | Mick Antoniw | | Labour Co-op | 2011 |
| Preseli Pembrokeshire | Paul Davies | | Conservative | 2007 |
| Rhondda | Leanne Wood | | Plaid Cymru | 2003 |
| Swansea East | Mike Hedges | | Labour | 2011 |
| Swansea West | Julie James | | Labour | 2011 |
| Torfaen | Lynne Neagle | | Labour Co-op | 1999 |
| Vale of Clwyd | Ann Jones | | Labour Co-op | 1999 |
| Vale of Glamorgan | Jane Hutt | | Labour | 1999 |
| Wrexham | Lesley Griffiths | | Labour | 2007 |
| Ynys Môn | Rhun ap Iorwerth | | Plaid Cymru | 2013 |

Regional members
| Region | Member | Portrait | Party | First elected |
|---|---|---|---|---|
| Mid and West Wales | Neil Hamilton | | UKIP | 2016 |
| Mid and West Wales | Eluned Morgan | | Labour | 2016 |
| Mid and West Wales | Helen Mary Jones | | Plaid Cymru | 2018 |
| Mid and West Wales | Joyce Watson | | Labour | 2007 |
| North Wales | Michelle Brown | | Independent | 2016 |
| North Wales | Mandy Jones | | Independent Alliance for Reform | 2017 |
| North Wales | Llŷr Gruffydd | | Plaid Cymru | 2011 |
| North Wales | Mark Isherwood | | Conservative | 2003 |
| South Wales Central | Gareth Bennett | | Abolish the Welsh Assembly Party | 2016 |
| South Wales Central | Andrew R. T. Davies | | Conservative | 2007 |
| South Wales Central | Neil McEvoy | | Propel | 2016 |
| South Wales Central | David Melding | | Conservative | 1999 |
| South Wales East | Laura Anne Jones | | Conservative | 2003 |
| South Wales East | Delyth Jewell | | Plaid Cymru | 2018 |
| South Wales East | Mark Reckless | | Abolish the Welsh Assembly Party | 2016 |
| South Wales East | David Rowlands | | Independent Alliance for Reform | 2016 |
| South Wales West | Suzy Davies | | Conservative | 2011 |
| South Wales West | Bethan Jenkins | | Plaid Cymru | 2007 |
| South Wales West | Caroline Jones | | Independent Alliance for Reform | 2016 |
| South Wales West | Dai Lloyd | | Plaid Cymru | 2016 |

== See also ==
- Third Jones ministry
- First Drakeford government
- 2016 National Assembly for Wales election
- 1999 National Assembly for Wales election and Members of the 1st National Assembly for Wales
- 2003 National Assembly for Wales election and Members of the 2nd National Assembly for Wales
- 2007 National Assembly for Wales election and Members of the 3rd National Assembly for Wales
- 2011 National Assembly for Wales election and Members of the 4th National Assembly for Wales
- 2016 National Assembly for Wales election and Members of the 5th National Assembly for Wales
- 2021 Senedd election and Members of the 6th Senedd
- List of by-elections to Senedd Cymru and List of elections to the Senedd
- Senedd constituencies and electoral regions
