= List of Welsh AMs/MSs with the shortest service =

This is a list of the shortest serving Members of the Senedd (MSs) (formerly known as Members of the National Assembly for Wales or simply Assembly Members (AMs) until May 2020).

It includes every former member who served less than the original four-year full term.

| Name | Party | Seat | Served from | Served to | Term length | Days | Reason |
|---|---|---|---|---|---|---|---|
| David Jones | Conservative | North Wales | 10 September 2002 | 30 April 2003 | 7 months, 20 days | 232 | Did not contest 2003 election |
| Veronica German | Liberal Democrats | South Wales East | 1 July 2010 | 31 March 2011 | 8 months, 30 days | 273 | Defeated at next election |
| Janet Haworth | Conservative | North Wales | 27 May 2015 | 5 April 2016 | 10 months, 9 days | 314 | Defeated at next election |
| Alun Michael | Labour | Mid and West Wales | 6 May 1999 | 1 May 2000 | 11 months, 25 days | 361 | Resignation to focus on his role as an MP |
| Val Feld | Labour | Swansea East | 6 May 1999 | 17 July 2001 | 1 years, 2 months, 11 days | 438 | Death from cancer |
| Nathan Gill | UKIP^{[nb]} | North Wales | 5 May 2016 | 27 December 2017 | 1 year, 7 months, 22 days | 601 | Resignation to focus on his role as MEP |
| Christine Humphreys | Liberal Democrats | North Wales | 6 May 1999 | 22 March 2001 | 1 year, 10 months, 16 days | 686 | Resignation on health grounds |
| Steffan Lewis | Plaid Cymru | South Wales East | 6 May 2016 | 11 Jan 2019 | 2 years, 8 months, 5 days | 980 | Death from bowel cancer |
| Delyth Evans | Labour | Mid and West Wales | 1 May 2000 | 30 April 2003 | 3 years | 1,095 | Did not contest 2003 election |
| Mandy Jones | Independent^{[nb]} | North Wales | 27 December 2017 | 29 April 2021 | 3 years, 4 months, 2 days | 1,219 | Defeated at next election |
| Rod Richards | Conservative | North Wales | 6 May 1999 | 10 September 2002 | 3 years, 4 months, 4 days | 1,223 | Resignation on health grounds |

Footnotes:

- Elected for UKIP, sat as an independent from 16 August 2016
- Returned on the UKIP list following the resignation of Nathen Gill, sat from the beginning as an independent, later joined the Brexit Party then the Independent Alliance for Reform group

== See also ==
- List of by-elections to the Senedd
- List of United Kingdom MPs with the shortest service
- Regional member changes to the Senedd
