= List of co-options to the Senedd =

This is a list of co-options to the Senedd (Welsh Parliament; Welsh: Senedd Cymru; formerly the National Assembly of Wales before 2020). Until 2026, co-options were used for regional members: per the provisions of the Government of Wales Act, 1998, regional members of the Senedd who resign, die or are otherwise disqualified are replaced by the next available and willing person of their original party's list, and no by-election occurs.

The Senedd electoral regions were abolished prior to the 2026 Senedd election, therefore there are no longer any regional members. From 2026, all Senedd constituencies are multi-member and any member who leaves the Senedd is replaced by co-option rather than by-election.

These are the co-options that have occurred since the first elections in 1999.

Assembly / Senedd term	Region	Date (that new member took the oath)	Incumbent	Party	Replacement	Party	Cause
1999–2003	Mid and West Wales	1 May 2000	Alun Michael	Labour	Delyth Evans	Labour	Resignation to concentrate on his post as Member of Parliament
1999–2003	North Wales	22 March 2001	Christine Humphreys	Liberal Democrats	Eleanor Burnham	Liberal Democrats	Resignation on health grounds
1999–2003	North Wales	10 Sept 2002	Rod Richards	Conservative	David Jones	Conservative	Resignation on health grounds (Alcoholism)
2007–2011	South Wales East	30 June 2010	Mike German	Liberal Democrats	Veronica German	Liberal Democrats	Resignation on appointment to House of Lords
2011–2016	South Wales West	19 May 2015	Byron Davies	Conservative	Altaf Hussain	Conservative	Resignation on 15 May 2015 due to election as MP for Gower
2011–2016	North Wales	27 May 2015	Antoinette Sandbach	Conservative	Janet Haworth	Conservative	Resignation on 8 May 2015 due to election as MP for Eddisbury
2016–2021	North Wales	28 Dec 2017	Nathan Gill	UKIP	Mandy Jones	UKIP	Resignation on 27 December 2017 to concentrate on his post as Member of the European Parliament
2016–2021	Mid and West Wales	2 August 2018	Simon Thomas	Plaid Cymru	Helen Mary Jones	Plaid Cymru	Resignation on 25 July 2018 due to arrest for possession of indecent images
2016–2021	South Wales East	8 February 2019	Steffan Lewis	Plaid Cymru	Delyth Jewell	Plaid Cymru	Death from bowel cancer on 11 January 2019
2016–2021	South Wales East	6 July 2020	Mohammad Asghar	Conservative	Laura Anne Jones	Conservative	Death on 16 June 2020

No co-options occurred during the Second Assembly (2003–2007) and Sixth Senedd (2021-2026)

== See also ==
- List of by-elections to the Senedd
- List of Welsh AMs/MSs with the shortest service
- Regional member changes in the Scottish Parliament
