= Peter Rogers (politician) =

Welsh politician (1940–2025)

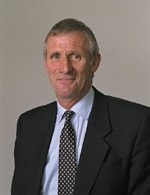
- Rogers in 1999

Isle of Anglesey Councillor for Bro Aberffraw ward
- In office 2 May 2013 – 5 May 2022
- Preceded by: Ward Established
- Succeeded by: Arfon Wyn

Isle of Anglesey Councillor for Rhosyr ward
- In office 10 June 2004 – 2 May 2013
- Succeeded by: Ward Abolished

Member of the Welsh Assembly for North Wales
- In office 6 May 1999 – 1 May 2003
- Preceded by: New Assembly
- Succeeded by: Brynle Williams

Personal details
- Born: 2 January 1940 Wrexham, Wales
- Died: 6 January 2025 (aged 85) Bangor, Gwynedd, Wales
- Party: Independent
- Other political affiliations: Conservative
- Education: Cheshire School of Agriculture

Peter Standing Rogers (2 January 1940 – 6 January 2025) was a Welsh politician, farmer and magistrate who was a Member of the Welsh Assembly (AM) for the North Wales Region from 1999 to 2003, representing the Welsh Conservative Party, and an Isle of Anglesey County Councillor from 2004 to 2022 - as an independent from 2005 onward.

Rogers left the Assembly in 2003, after being placed 7th on the Welsh Conservatives' North Wales regional list. He subsequently sought selection as the candidate for Ynys Môn in the 2005 general election, but left the Welsh Conservatives in 2005 after a protracted and disrupted selection contest. He would go on to seek election to both the UK Parliament and National Assembly for Wales as an independent.

== Background ==
Peter Standing Rogers was born on 2 January 1940 in Wrexham, Wales. He was raised in Birkenhead, England, where he attended Prenton Secondary School. He later studied at the Cheshire School of Agriculture, where he received a credit certificate in agriculture.

Rogers died in Ysbyty Gwynedd, Bangor on 6 January 2025, at the age of 85.

== Political career ==
=== National Assembly for Wales (1999–2003) ===
Rogers was Vice President of the Ynys Môn Conservative Association. He ran in the 1999 National Assembly for Wales election for the Ynys Mon constituency and in third place on the North Wales list. He was elected to represent North Wales in the First Assembly.

He was appointed by Rod Richards to be the Welsh Conservatives' Environment spokesman shortly after he was elected. After Nick Bourne took the lead of the party he was appointed as the Agriculture and Rural Affairs spokesperson in his frontbench team. He held this role until he lost his seat at the 2003 Assembly election.

As Agriculture and Rural Affairs spokesperson, he supported repealing the ban on beef on the bone, and was opposed to bans on fox hunting. In 2000, Rogers called for a debate on an attempted fox hunting ban in Westminster, despite the assembly having no responsibility over the matter at the time, and also called for a ban on French beef. He also led the Welsh Conservative response to the spread of foot-and-mouth disease to Wales in 2001 and tuberculosis in 2002. Three of his own farms were located in the initial foot and mouth exclusion zone in Ynys Môn, and his cattle were eventually culled. He was critical of the communication around the National Assembly's response to the disease.

In October 2001, it was announced he was investigated by standards authorities in the National Assembly for Wales for naming a civil servant, who he accused of failing to adequately handle a constituent's situation. The investigation was passed to the Assembly's Standards of Conduct Committee, which censured him in January 2002. He alleged that the complaint was "being used politically and was an attempt to keep [him] quiet during the foot-and-mouth crisis," but that what he had done was inappropriate.

In the same month, Ieuan Wyn Jones, leader of Plaid Cymru, threatened to sue Rogers, after he claimed that Jones was intending to resign his seat in the Ynys Mon constituency and contest the Caernarfon constituency instead. The threat was withdrawn the next day, although Jones did pursue action within the assembly with presiding officer Dafydd Elis-Thomas. The Presiding Officer chose not to proceed with the complaint.

Rogers was selected to contest the Ynys Mon constituency again at the 2003 National Assembly for Wales election in March 2002. He was also placed seventh on the North Wales regional list for the Conservative Party, after a local association member's vote to select the order. Rogers said he was "shellshocked and wounded" to discover his placement on the list. During the campaign, he was barred from a campaign event, after having to be held back to prevent an altercation between himself and the area Liberal Democrat candidate at a hustings hosted by the Federation of Small Businesses. He was not re-elected to represent North Wales, nor elected to represent Ynys Môn. However, he increased his share of the vote in Ynys Môn by 9.2%, coming second with 38.5% of the vote, 2,255 votes behind Plaid Cymru leader Ieuan Wyn Jones.

=== Deselection and selection controversies ===
There was an attempt to select Rogers for the Ynys Môn constituency for the 2005 United Kingdom general election, but it was unsuccessful, with his application to be on the short list being rejected by the Conservative Party. However, the selection process failed after disruption from supporters of Rogers in December 2003. A second selection process beginning in January 2004 also failed to nominate, with two candidates not attending the eventual selection meeting, and protest from supporters of Rogers. A motion of no confidence in Anglesey Conservative association was passed at the meeting. Members had been threatened with expulsion if the process was disrupted again. Rogers was refused entry to the Welsh Conservative party conference in 2004. In December 2004, James Roach was selected as the Conservative candidate for the seat.

==== Ynys Môn electoral contests as an independent ====
In February 2005, he announced he would run as an independent candidate for Ynys Môn at the 2005 general election, and resigned from the Conservative party. Rogers came third, receiving 14.7% of the vote, and defeating Conservative candidate James Roach. He stood for Ynys Môn at the 2007 Welsh Assembly election, and came second, with 23.3% of the vote. He also stood again at the 2010 United Kingdom general election, dropping to fifth place and receiving 6.5% of the vote. He had been approached to contest the election as a UKIP candidate, but refused.

=== Local government ===
Rogers announced he would contest Rhosyr ward on Ynys Mon council as an independent at elections held in June 2004. He was successfully elected. His re-election in 2008 was uncontested. He served as High Sheriff of Gwynedd from 2008 to 2009 and represented Isle of Anglesey council on North Wales Police Authority. Rhosyr ward was abolished for the 2013 council elections, and Rogers moved to the Bro Aberffraw ward, which he was elected to represent in 2013 and 2017. He was not re-elected in 2022.

==== Suspensions and allegations against the council ====
In 2011, Rogers was cleared of bullying and harassment in 2011, after an April 2010 incident where he accompanied a constituent to the police station, and acted in a manner that was found to have brought Anglesey council and the office of councillor into disrepute.

In December 2014, he refused to attend council meetings, claiming he was deliberately being sent Welsh-only correspondence, which he could not read.

In 2015, Rogers was suspended from the council for 3 months. He had been being investigated over a 2013 incident, in which he made efforts to speed up the sale of land, where he had a "close, personal association" to one of the involved parties, and "misused his position" to gain advantage for the buyer of the land. He was cleared of having a prejudicial interest in the sale of some land by the council, but was regardless suspended for a month for his criticism of the Public Service Ombudsman and the officer responsible for investigating him. He appealed his one-month suspension, and attempted to escalate the matter to Local Government Minister Julie James and First Minister Carwyn Jones. His appeal hearing recommended his suspension be increased to 3 months.

== Death ==
Rogers was admitted to Ysbyty Gwynedd in Bangor on 2 January 2025. He died on 6 January, aged 86.

== Offices held ==
Senedd
Preceded by (new post)	Assembly Member for North Wales; 1999–2003	Succeeded by Brynle Williams
