= Clwyd South =

Clwyd South may refer to:

- Clwyd South (UK Parliament constituency)
- Clwyd South (Senedd constituency)
