= List of Senedd elections =

This is a list of elections to the Senedd (Welsh Parliament; Welsh: Senedd Cymru; formerly the National Assembly for Wales until May 2020), the devolved legislature of Wales. These elections have been held regularly since its establishment in 1999. The elections are held every four years since 2026 following the Senedd Cymru (Members and Elections) Act 2024, and every four years between 1999 and 2016. It was held every five years between 2016 and 2026 following the Wales Act 2014.

== Elections ==
=== Senedd (2020–present) ===
- 2026 Senedd election
- 2021 Senedd election

=== National Assembly for Wales (1999–2020) ===
- 2016 National Assembly for Wales election
- 2011 National Assembly for Wales election
- 2007 National Assembly for Wales election
- 2003 National Assembly for Wales election
- 1999 National Assembly for Wales election

== By-elections and regional member changes ==
- List of by-elections to the Senedd
- Regional member changes to the Senedd
