= North Wales (Senedd electoral region) =

Senedd electoral region (1999–2026)

- Gogledd Cymru (Welsh)
- Former Multi-member electoral region for the Senedd
- Map of North Wales, with constituencies numbered alphabetically. Inset within Wales shown to the top with the four regional seats.
Interactive map
Interactive map of the constituency.
- Preserved counties: Clwyd; Gwynedd (part)

Former Multi-member electoral region
- Created: 1999 (amended in 2007)
- Abolished: 2026
- Number of members: 13; 9 constituency; 4 regional
- MSs (last elected in 2021): Conservative (5); Labour (5); Plaid Cymru (3)
- Constituencies: 1. Aberconwy (since 2007); 2. Alyn and Deeside; 3. Arfon (since 2007); 4. Clwyd South; 5. Clwyd West; 6. Delyn; 7. Vale of Clwyd; 8. Wrexham; 9. Ynys Môn
- Former constituencies (1999–2007): Caernarfon; Conwy

North Wales (Welsh: Gogledd Cymru) was an electoral region of the Senedd, consisting of nine constituencies. The region elected thirteen members, nine directly elected constituency members and four additional members. The electoral region was first used in the 1999 Welsh Assembly election, when the National Assembly for Wales was created.

Each constituency elected one Member of the Senedd by the first past the post electoral system, and the region as a whole elected four additional or top-up Members of the Senedd, to create a degree of proportional representation. The additional member seats were allocated from closed lists by the D'Hondt method, with constituency results being taken into account in the allocation.

== County and Westminster boundaries ==
Map of 2007–2026 boundaries

As created in 1999, the region covered most of the preserved county of Clwyd, part of the preserved county of Gwynedd, and part of the preserved county of Powys. Other parts of these preserved counties were within the Mid and West Wales electoral region. For the 2007 Welsh Assembly election, however, boundaries changed, and the region later covered all of the preserved county of Clwyd and part of the preserved county of Gwynedd. The rest of Gwynedd was in the Mid and West Wales region.

The Senedd constituencies had the names of constituencies of the House of Commons of the Parliament of the United Kingdom (Westminster). For Westminster election purposes, however, there are no electoral regions, and constituency boundary changes became effective for the 2010 United Kingdom general election.

They were abolished ahead of the 2026 Senedd election.

== Electoral region profile ==
The region was a mix of rural and urban areas, with the population higher in the east, where can be found the region's largest settlement, Wrexham, and the working-class conurbations of Deeside. The western areas, including the Isle of Anglesey (Ynys Môn), are largely rural. Although Anglesey and Gwynedd serve as the home to large numbers of Welsh speakers, with the language not being widely spoken in the north-east.

== Constituencies ==
| Constituency | 2021 result | Preserved county |
|---|---|---|
| Aberconwy | Janet Finch-Saunders; Conservative | Entirely within Clwyd |
| Alyn and Deeside | Jack Sargeant; Labour | Entirely within Clwyd |
| Arfon | Siân Gwenllian; Plaid Cymru | Entirely within Gwynedd |
| Clwyd South | Ken Skates; Labour | Entirely within Clwyd |
| Clwyd West | Darren Millar; Conservative | Entirely within Clwyd |
| Delyn | Hannah Blythyn; Labour | Entirely within Clwyd |
| Vale of Clwyd | Gareth Davies; Conservative | Entirely within Clwyd |
| Wrexham | Lesley Griffiths; Labour | Entirely within Clwyd |
| Ynys Môn | Rhun ap Iorwerth; Plaid Cymru | Entirely within Gwynedd |

== Former constituencies ==
=== 1999 to 2007 ===
Map of former boundaries 1999-2007

| Constituency | Preserved counties |
|---|---|
| 1. Alyn and Deeside | Entirely within Clwyd |
| 2. Caernarfon | Entirely within Gwynedd |
| 3. Clwyd South | Partly Clwyd, partly Powys |
| 4. Clwyd West | Entirely within Clwyd |
| 5. Conwy | Partly Clwyd, partly Gwynedd |
| 6. Delyn | Entirely within Clwyd |
| 7. Vale of Clwyd | Entirely within Clwyd |
| 8. Wrexham | Entirely within Clwyd |
| 9. Ynys Môn | Entirely within Gwynedd |

== Assembly members and Members of the Senedd ==
=== Constituency AMs and MSs ===
| Term | Election | Conwy | Alyn and Deeside | Caernarfon | Clwyd South | Clwyd West | Delyn | Vale of Clwyd | Wrexham | Ynys Môn |
|---|---|---|---|---|---|---|---|---|---|---|
| 1st | 1999 | Gareth Jones (PC) | Tom Middlehurst (Lab) | Dafydd Wigley (PC) | Karen Sinclair (Lab) | Alun Pugh (Lab) | Alison Halford (Lab) | Ann Jones (Lab) | John Marek (Lab) (later JMIP then Forward Wales) | Ieuan Wyn Jones (PC) |
| 2nd | 2003 | Denise Idris Jones (Lab) | Carl Sargeant (Lab) | Alun Ffred Jones (PC) | Karen Sinclair (Lab) | Alun Pugh (Lab) | Sandy Mewies (Lab) | Ann Jones (Lab) | John Marek (Lab) (later JMIP then Forward Wales) | Ieuan Wyn Jones (PC) |
| Term | Election | Aberconwy | Alyn and Deeside | Arfon | Clwyd South | Clwyd West | Delyn | Vale of Clwyd | Wrexham | Ynys Môn |
| 3rd | 2007 | Gareth Jones (PC) | Carl Sargeant (Lab) | Alun Ffred Jones (PC) | Karen Sinclair (Lab) | Darren Millar (Con) | Sandy Mewies (Lab) | Ann Jones (Lab) | Lesley Griffiths (Lab) | Ieuan Wyn Jones (PC) |
| 4th | 2011 | Janet Finch-Saunders (Con) | Carl Sargeant (Lab) | Alun Ffred Jones (PC) | Ken Skates (Lab) | Darren Millar (Con) | Sandy Mewies (Lab) | Ann Jones (Lab) | Lesley Griffiths (Lab) | Ieuan Wyn Jones (PC) |
| 4th | 2013 | Janet Finch-Saunders (Con) | Carl Sargeant (Lab) | Alun Ffred Jones (PC) | Ken Skates (Lab) | Darren Millar (Con) | Sandy Mewies (Lab) | Ann Jones (Lab) | Lesley Griffiths (Lab) | Rhun ap Iorwerth (PC) |
| 5th | 2016 | Janet Finch-Saunders (Con) | Carl Sargeant (Lab) | Siân Gwenllian (PC) | Ken Skates (Lab) | Darren Millar (Con) | Hannah Blythyn (Lab) | Ann Jones (Lab) | Lesley Griffiths (Lab) | Rhun ap Iorwerth (PC) |
| 5th | 2018 | Janet Finch-Saunders (Con) | Jack Sargeant (Lab) | Siân Gwenllian (PC) | Ken Skates (Lab) | Darren Millar (Con) | Hannah Blythyn (Lab) | Ann Jones (Lab) | Lesley Griffiths (Lab) | Rhun ap Iorwerth (PC) |
| 6th | 2021 | Janet Finch-Saunders (Con) | Jack Sargeant (Lab) | Siân Gwenllian (PC) | Ken Skates (Lab) | Darren Millar (Con) | Hannah Blythyn (Lab) | Gareth Davies (Con) | Lesley Griffiths (Lab) | Rhun ap Iorwerth (PC) |

=== Regional list AMs and MSs ===
N.B. This table is for presentation purposes only

| Term | Election | MS | MS | MS | MS |
|---|---|---|---|---|---|
| 1st | 1999 | Rod Richards (Con) | Peter Rogers (Con) | Christine Humphreys (LD) | Janet Ryder (PC) |
| 1st | 2001 (Note: Christine Humphreys resigned in March 2001 and was replaced by Eleanor Burnham.) | Rod Richards (Con) | Peter Rogers (Con) | Eleanor Burnham (LD) | Janet Ryder (PC) |
| 1st | 2002 (Note: Rod Richards resigned in September 2002 and was replaced by David Jones.) | David Jones (Con) | Peter Rogers (Con) | Eleanor Burnham (LD) | Janet Ryder (PC) |
| 2nd | 2003 | Mark Isherwood (Con) | Brynle Williams (Con) | Eleanor Burnham (LD) | Janet Ryder (PC) |
| 3rd | 2007 | Mark Isherwood (Con) | Brynle Williams (Con) | Eleanor Burnham (LD) | Janet Ryder (PC) |
| 4th | 2011 | Mark Isherwood (Con) | Antoinette Sandbach (Con) | Aled Roberts (LD) | Llyr Gruffydd (PC) |
| 4th | 2015 (Note: Antoinette Sandbach resigned in May 2015 and was replaced by Janet Haworth.) | Mark Isherwood (Con) | Janet Haworth (Con) | Aled Roberts (LD) | Llyr Gruffydd (PC) |
| 5th | 2016 | Mark Isherwood (Con) | Nathan Gill (UKIP) (later Independent) | Michelle Brown (UKIP), later Independent | Llyr Gruffydd (PC) |
| 5th | 2016 (Note: Nathan Gill left the UKIP Group in the Assembly as a result of infighting. He remained a member of the party but sat as an independent in the Assembly.) | Mark Isherwood (Con) | Nathan Gill (UKIP) (later Independent) | Michelle Brown (UKIP), later Independent | Llyr Gruffydd (PC) |
| 5th | 2017 (Note: Gill resigned from the National Assembly on 27 December 2017. He was replaced by Mandy Jones, the next candidate on the UKIP list.) | Mark Isherwood (Con) | Mandy Jones (Independent) (Note: Although a member of the party and elected in its name, Jones did not join the UKIP group upon her election to the Senedd. The UKIP group said it would be "impossible" as some of Jones' staff had "campaigned actively for other parties".) (later BREX) | Michelle Brown (UKIP), later Independent | Llyr Gruffydd (PC) |
| 5th | 2019 | Mark Isherwood (Con) | Mandy Jones (Independent) (later BREX) | Michelle Brown (UKIP), later Independent | Llyr Gruffydd (PC) |
| 6th | 2021 | Mark Isherwood (Con) | Sam Rowlands (Con) | Carolyn Thomas (Lab) | Llyr Gruffydd (PC) |

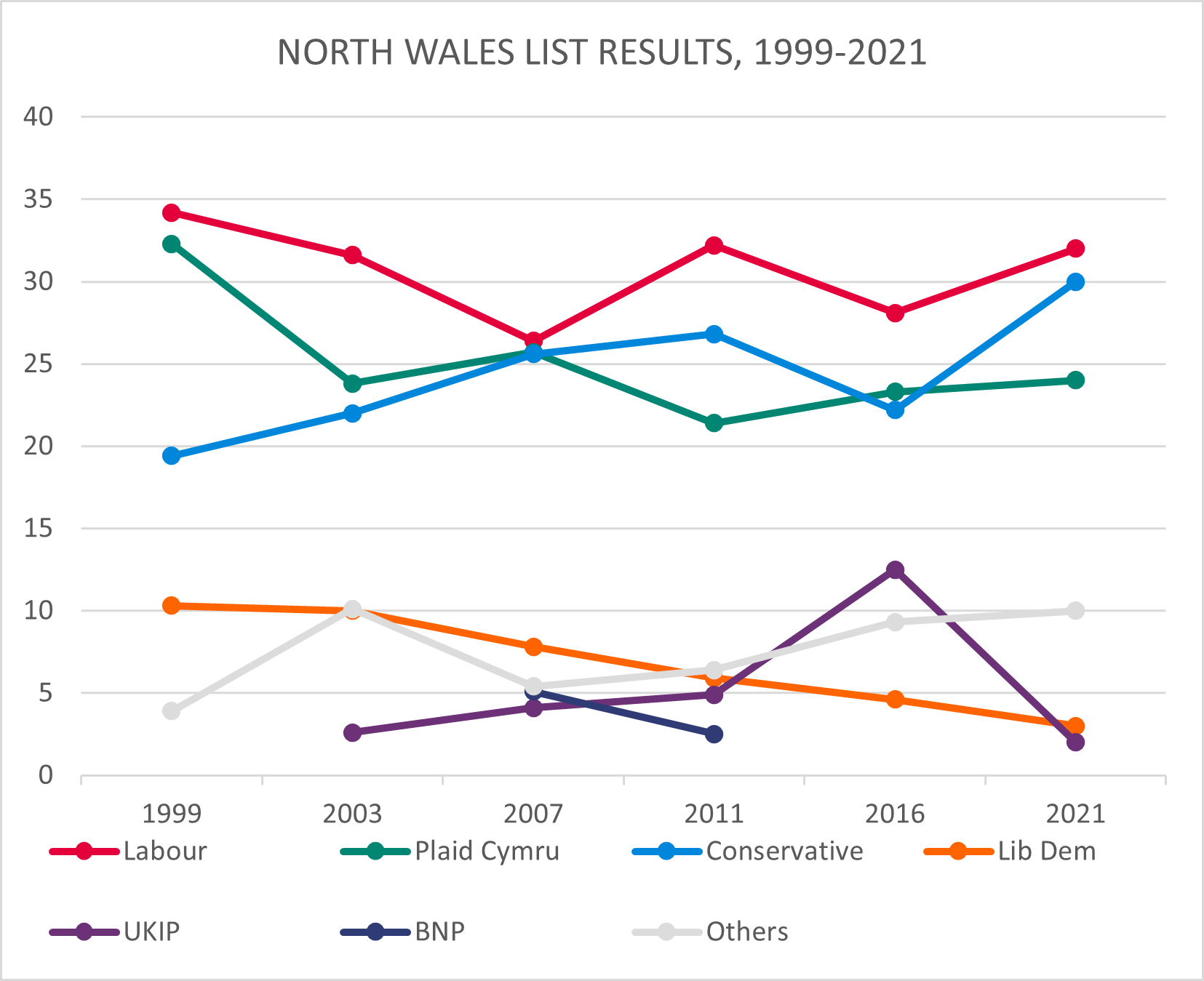
Election results since 1999 (parties who never got >5% counted as others)

=== 2021 Senedd election ===
2021 Senedd election: North Wales
| List | Candidates | Votes | Of total (%) | ± from prev. |
|---|---|---|---|---|
| Labour | Carolyn Thomas, Andrew Short, Diane Green, Ryan O'Gorman | 73,120 | 32.3 | ▲4.2 |
| Conservative | Mark Isherwood, Sam Rowlands, Barbara Hughes, Gareth Davies, Abigail Mainon, Jeremy Kent, Gonul Daniels, Lyn Hudson, Anthony Thomas | 67,544 | 29.9 | ▲7.7 |
| Plaid Cymru | Llyr Gruffydd, Carrie Harper, Elin Jones, Paul Rowlinson, Catrin Wager, Aaron Wynne, Jack Morris, Glenn Swingler, Trystan Lewis | 53,950 | 23.9 | ▲0.6 |
| Abolish | Richard Suchorzewski, Jonathon Harrington, William Ashton, Craig Search, Euan McGivern, Nicholas Williams | 7,960 | 3.5 | ▼1.1 |
| Liberal Democrats | Christopher Twells, David Wilkins, Timothy Sly, Calum Davies, Andrew Parkhurst | 7,160 | 3.2 | ▼1.4 |
| Green | Iolo Jones, Duncan Rees, Adam Turner, Linda Rogers | 6,586 | 2.9 | ▲0.6 |
| UKIP | Felix Aubel, Jeanie Bassford-Barton, Mary Davies, Jeanette Bassford-Barton, Sebastian Ross | 3,573 | 1.6 | ▼10.9 |
| Reform | Nathan Gill, Peter Dain, Nancy Eno, Charles Dodman, Emmett Jenner | 2,374 | 1.0 | ▲1.0 |
| Gwlad | Phil Roberts, Aled Job, Rhydian Hughes, Aaron Norton, Anthony Williams | 1,228 | 0.5 | ▲0.5 |
| Freedom Alliance | Simon Foster, Peter Jones, Miriam Finch, Mark Finchr | 1,186 | 0.5 | ▲0.5 |
| Communist | Trevor Jones, Jayne Evans, David Morgan, Glyn Davies | 557 | 0.2 | ▼0.1 |
| Propel | Jacqui Hurst, Robert Redhead, Nia Marshall Lloyd, Alan Ennis | 415 | 0.2 | ▲0.2 |
| Independent | Michelle Brown | 382 | 0.2 | ▲0.2 |
| TUSC | Michelle Francis | 164 | 0.1 | ▲0.1 |

== 2021 Senedd election additional members ==
| Party | Constituency seats | List votes (vote %) | D'Hondt entitlement | Additional members elected | Total members elected | Deviation from D'Hondt entitlement |
|---|---|---|---|---|---|---|
| Labour | 4 | 73,120 (32%) | 5 | 1 | 5 | 0 |
| Conservative | 3 | 67,544 (30%) | 5 | 2 | 5 | 0 |
| Plaid Cymru | 2 | 53,950 (24%) | 3 | 1 | 3 | 0 |
| Abolish | 0 | 7,960 (4%) | 0 | 0 | 0 | 0 |
| Liberal Democrats | 0 | 7,160 (3%) | 0 | 0 | 0 | 0 |
| Green | 0 | 6,586 (3%) | 0 | 0 | 0 | 0 |
| UKIP | 0 | 3,573 (2%) | 0 | 0 | 0 | 0 |
| Reform | 0 | 2,374 (1%) | 0 | 0 | 0 | 0 |
| Gwlad | 0 | 1,228 (1%) | 0 | 0 | 0 | 0 |
| Freedom Alliance | 0 | 1,186 (1%) | 0 | 0 | 0 | 0 |
| Communist | 0 | 557 (0%) | 0 | 0 | 0 | 0 |
| Propel | 0 | 415 (0%) | 0 | 0 | 0 | 0 |
| Independent – Brown | 0 | 382 (0%) | 0 | 0 | 0 | 0 |
| TUSC | 0 | 164 (0%) | 0 | 0 | 0 | 0 |

(The fourth regional seat was allocated to the Conservatives rather than to Plaid Cymru by a margin of only 21 votes).

=== Regional MSs elected in 2021 ===
| Party | Name |
|---|---|
| Plaid Cymru | Llyr Huws Gruffydd |
| Conservative | Mark Isherwood |
| Labour | Carolyn Thomas |
| Conservative | Sam Rowlands |

== 2016 Welsh Assembly election additional members ==
2016 National Assembly for Wales election: North Wales
| Party | Constituency seats | List votes (vote %) | D'Hondt entitlement | Additional members elected | Total members elected | Deviation from D'Hondt entitlement |
|---|---|---|---|---|---|---|
| Labour | 5 | 57,528 (28.1%) | 4 | 0 | 5 | +1 |
| Plaid Cymru | 2 | 47,701 (23.3%) | 4 | 1 | 3 | -1 |
| Conservative | 2 | 45,468 (22.2%) | 3 | 1 | 3 | 0 |
| UKIP | 0 | 25,518 (12.5%) | 2 | 2 | 2 | 0 |
| Abolish | 0 | 9,409 (4.6%) | 0 | 0 | 0 | 0 |
| Liberal Democrats | 0 | 9,345 (4.6%) | 0 | 0 | 0 | 0 |
| Green | 0 | 4,789 (2.3%) | 0 | 0 | 0 | 0 |
| Association of Welsh Local Independents | 0 | 1,865 (0.9%) | 0 | 0 | 0 | 0 |
| Monster Raving Loony | 0 | 1,355 (0.7%) | 0 | 0 | 0 | 0 |
| Independent - Mark Young | 0 | 926 (0.5%) | 0 | 0 | 0 | 0 |
| Welsh Communist Party | 0 | 586 (0.3%) | 0 | 0 | 0 | 0 |

=== Regional AMs elected in 2016 ===
| Party | Name |
|---|---|
| Conservative | Mark Isherwood |
| UKIP | Michelle Brown |
| UKIP | Nathan Gill |
| Plaid Cymru | Llyr Huws Gruffydd |

== 2011 Welsh Assembly election additional members ==
2011 National Assembly for Wales election: North Wales
| Party | Constituency seats | List votes (vote %) | D'Hondt entitlement | Additional members elected | Total members elected | Deviation from D'Hondt entitlement |
|---|---|---|---|---|---|---|
| Labour | 5 | 62,677 (32.2%) | 5 | 0 | 5 | 0 |
| Conservative | 2 | 52,201 (26.8%) | 4 | 2 | 4 | 0 |
| Plaid Cymru | 2 | 41,701 (21.4%) | 3 | 1 | 3 | 0 |
| Liberal Democrats | 0 | 11,507 (5.9%) | 1 | 1 | 1 | 0 |
| UKIP | 0 | 9,608 (4.9%) | 0 | 0 | 0 | 0 |
| Socialist Labour | 0 | 4,895 (2.5%) | 0 | 0 | 0 | 0 |
| BNP | 0 | 4,785 (2.5%) | 0 | 0 | 0 | 0 |
| Green | 0 | 4,406 (2.3%) | 0 | 0 | 0 | 0 |
| Welsh Christian | 0 | 1,401 (0.7%) | 0 | 0 | 0 | 0 |
| Independent | 0 | 1,094 (0.6%) | 0 | 0 | 0 | 0 |
| Communist | 0 | 523 (0.3%) | 0 | 0 | 0 | 0 |

=== Regional AMs elected 2011 ===
| Party | Name |
|---|---|
| Conservative | Mark Isherwood |
| Conservative | Antoinette Sandbach † |
| Liberal Democrats | Aled Roberts |
| Plaid Cymru | Llyr Huws Gruffydd |

† Resigned as AM following her election to the UK House of Commons on 7 May 2015; replaced by Janet Haworth from 27 May 2015.

== 2007 Welsh Assembly election additional members ==
2007 National Assembly for Wales election: North Wales
| Party | Constituency seats | List votes (vote %) | D'Hondt entitlement | Additional members elected | Total members elected | Deviation from D'Hondt entitlement |
|---|---|---|---|---|---|---|
| Labour | 5 | 51,831 (26.4%) | 4 | 0 | 5 | +1 |
| Plaid Cymru | 3 | 50,558 (25.7%) | 4 | 1 | 4 | 0 |
| Conservative | 1 | 50,266 (25.6%) | 4 | 2 | 3 | −1 |
| Liberal Democrats | 0 | 15,275 (7.8%) | 1 | 1 | 1 | 0 |
| BNP | 0 | 9,986 (5.1%) | 0 | 0 | 0 | 0 |
| UKIP | 0 | 8,015 (4.1%) | 0 | 0 | 0 | 0 |
| Green | 0 | 5,660 (2.9%) | 0 | 0 | 0 | 0 |
| Socialist Labour | 0 | 2,209 (1.1%) | 0 | 0 | 0 | 0 |
| Welsh Christian | 0 | 1,300 (0.7%) | 0 | 0 | 0 | 0 |
| Communist | 0 | 700 (0.4%) | 0 | 0 | 0 | 0 |
| CPA | 0 | 642 (0.3%) | 0 | 0 | 0 | 0 |

== 2003 Welsh Assembly election additional members ==
2003 National Assembly for Wales election: North Wales
| Party | Constituency seats | List votes (vote %) | D'Hondt entitlement | Additional members elected | Total members elected | Deviation from D'Hondt entitlement |
|---|---|---|---|---|---|---|
| Labour | 6 | 55,250 (31.6%) | 5 | 0 | 6 | +1 |
| Plaid Cymru | 2 | 41,640 (23.8%) | 3 | 1 | 3 | 0 |
| Conservative | 0 | 38,543 (22.0%) | 3 | 2 | 2 | -1 |
| Liberal Democrats | 0 | 17,503 (10.0%) | 1 | 1 | 1 | 0 |
| Independent | 1 | 11,008 (6.3%) | 1 | 0 | 1 | 0 |
| UKIP | 0 | 4,500 (2.6%) | 0 | 0 | 0 | 0 |
| Green | 0 | 4,200 (2.4%) | 0 | 0 | 0 | 0 |
| Cymru Annibynnol | 0 | 1,552 (0.9%) | 0 | 0 | 0 | 0 |
| Communist | 0 | 522 (0.3%) | 0 | 0 | 0 | 0 |
| ProLife Alliance | 0 | 310 (0.2%) | 0 | 0 | 0 | 0 |

== 1999 Welsh Assembly election additional members ==
1999 National Assembly for Wales election: North Wales region
| Party | Constituency seats | List votes (vote %) | D'Hondt entitlement | Additional members elected | Total members elected | Deviation from D'Hondt entitlement |
|---|---|---|---|---|---|---|
| Labour | 6 | 73,673 (34.2%) | 5 | 0 | 6 | +1 |
| Plaid Cymru | 3 | 69,518 (32.3%) | 5 | 1 | 4 | -1 |
| Conservative | 0 | 41,700 (19.4%) | 2 | 2 | 2 | 0 |
| Liberal Democrats | 0 | 22,130 (10.3%) | 1 | 1 | 1 | 0 |
| Green | 0 | 4,667 (2.2%) | 0 | 0 | 0 | 0 |
| Rhuddlan Debt Protest Campaign | 0 | 1,353 (0.6%) | 0 | 0 | 0 | 0 |
| Socialist Alliance | 0 | 828 (0.4%) | 0 | 0 | 0 | 0 |
| Natural Law | 0 | 917 (0.4%) | 0 | 0 | 0 | 0 |
| Communist | 0 | 714 (0.3%) | 0 | 0 | 0 | 0 |
