= 2018 Alyn and Deeside by-election =

Welsh Assembly by-election

- 6 February 2018

The Alyn and Deeside seat in the Welsh Assembly. Triggered by the death of the incumbent
- Turnout: 29.1% (▼5.9%)
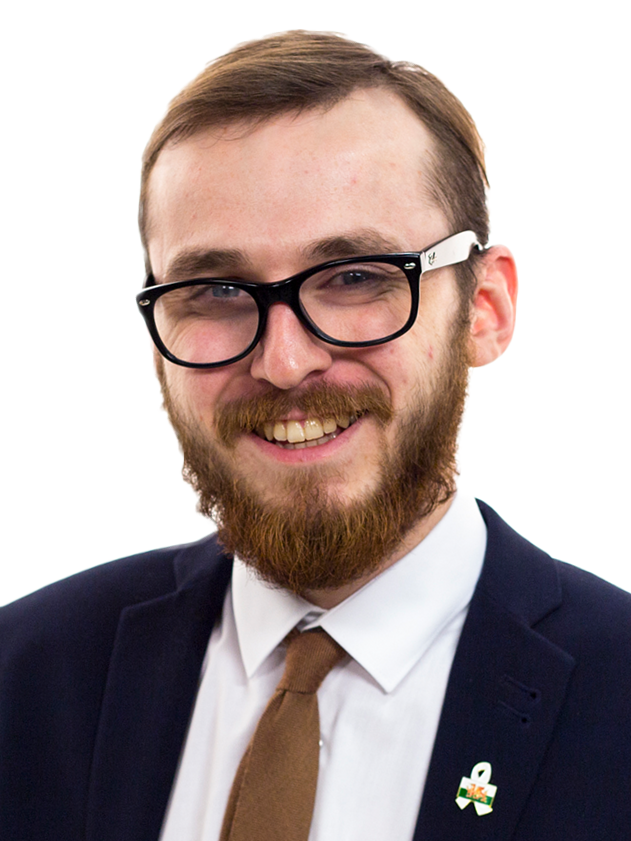

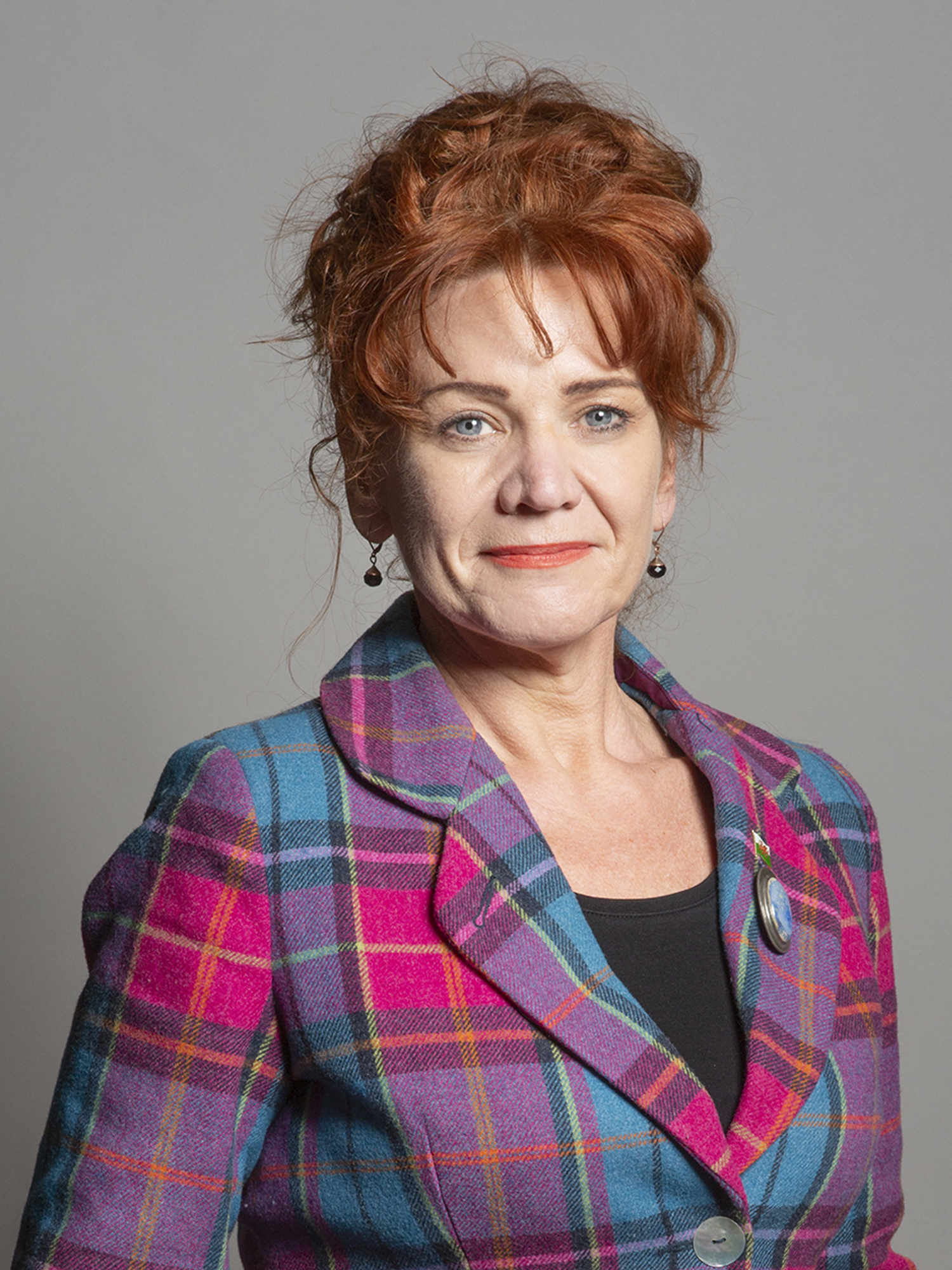

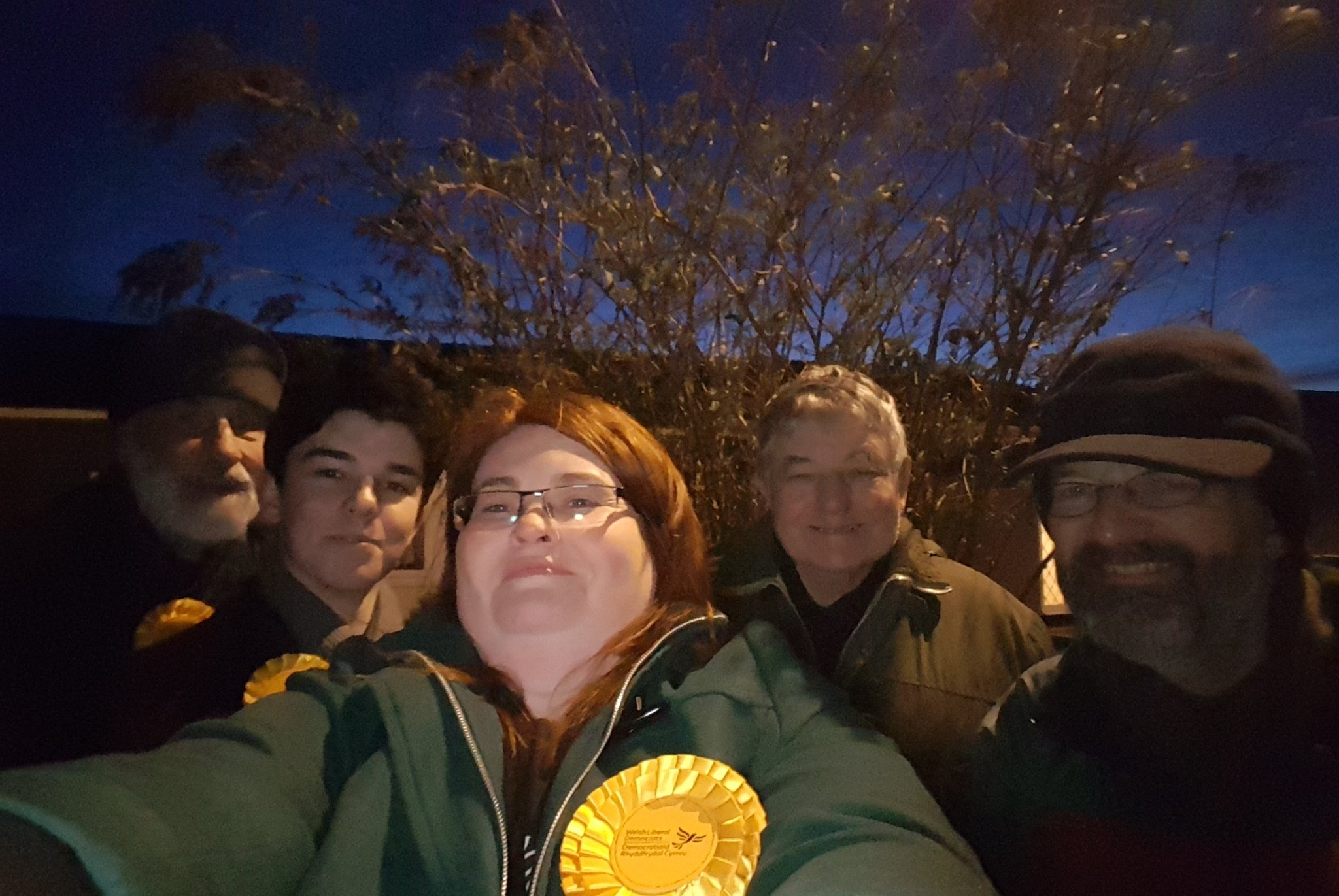

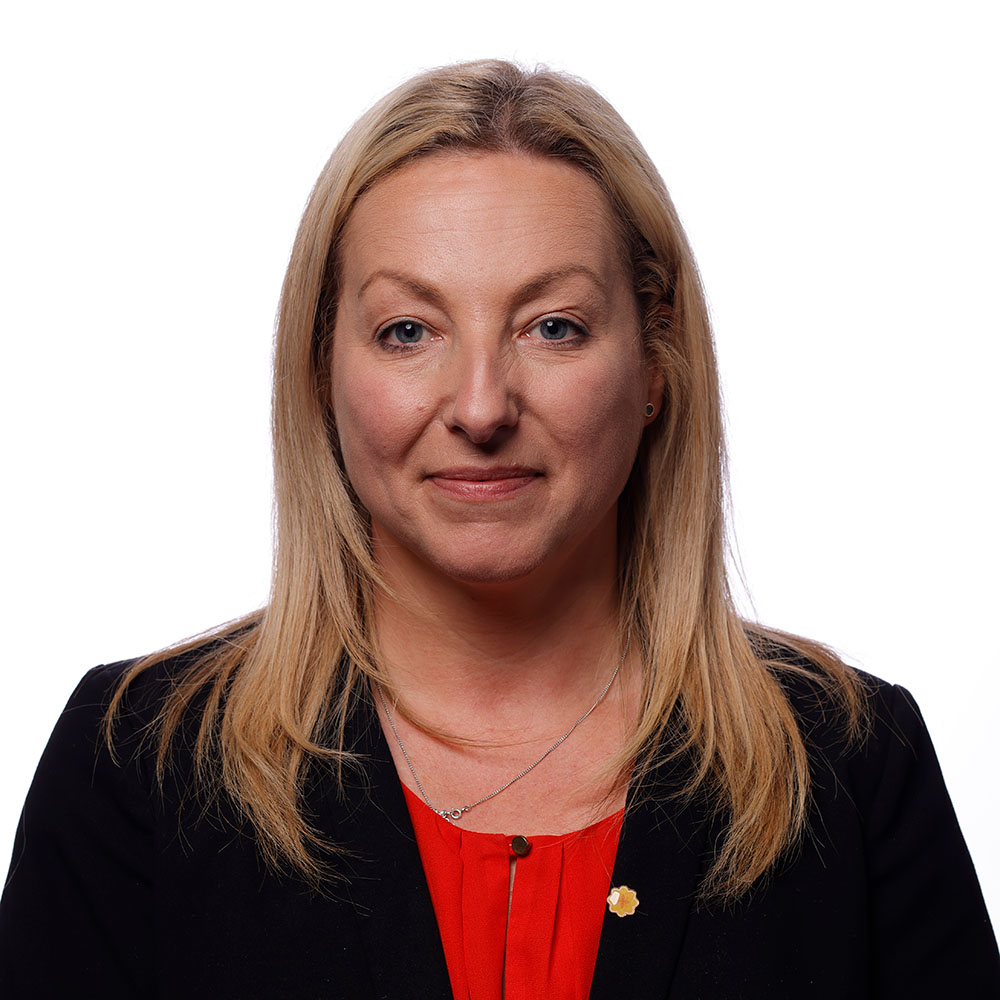
	First party	Second party
Candidate	Jack Sargeant	Sarah Atherton
Party	Labour	Conservative
Popular vote	11,267	4,722
Percentage	60.7%	25.4%
Swing	▲15.0%	▲4.4%
	Third party	Fourth party
Candidate	Donna Lalek	Carrie Harper
Party	Liberal Democrats	Plaid Cymru
Popular vote	1,176	1,059
Percentage	6.3%	5.7%
Swing	▲1.8%	▼3.3%
- Map showing the Alyn and Deeside Assembly constituency within the North Wales electoral region.
AM before election
Carl Sargeant
Labour
Subsequent AM
Jack Sargeant
Labour

The 2018 Alyn and Deeside by-election is a by-election that took place in the National Assembly for Wales constituency of Alyn and Deeside on Tuesday 6 February 2018, following the death of incumbent Labour AM Carl Sargeant on 7 November 2017.

The election was the fourth Assembly by-election to be held since its formation in 1999. The seat is a safe seat for the Labour Party, having been held continuously by the party since the beginning of devolved government. The corresponding seat in the UK Parliament has been held by Labour since its creation in 1983. As a result of the vacancy, the governing coalition of Labour, one Liberal Democrat and one Independent held exactly half of the seats in the Welsh Assembly, meaning that a gain for the opposition would have cost the government its majority.

== Background ==
Carl Sargeant had been the Labour Party AM for the seat since the 2003 Assembly election, and held numerous junior and cabinet-level positions before being appointed the Cabinet Secretary for Communities and Children in May 2016. Amidst the 2017 Westminster sexual scandals he was suspended from the Labour Party and removed from his position on 3 November 2017, following unspecified allegations about his conduct. He was found dead at his home in Connah's Quay four days later. North Wales Police said that they were not treating his death as suspicious. It was reported that Sargeant had taken his own life. At the opening of the inquest on 13 November, the coroner was told that his death was likely to have been due to hanging. The coroner also commented that the death was "an apparent act of self harm".

The by-election was scheduled for the latest date possible – 6 February 2018 – three calendar months following Carl Sargeant's death. This resulted in the unusual situation of polling day falling on a Tuesday, breaking the convention of UK elections taking place on a Thursday. The Presiding Officer of the Welsh Assembly justified the choice of date as being due to the "sensitivities of the circumstances which led to the vacancy arising" as well as the impact of the Christmas break on arrangements.

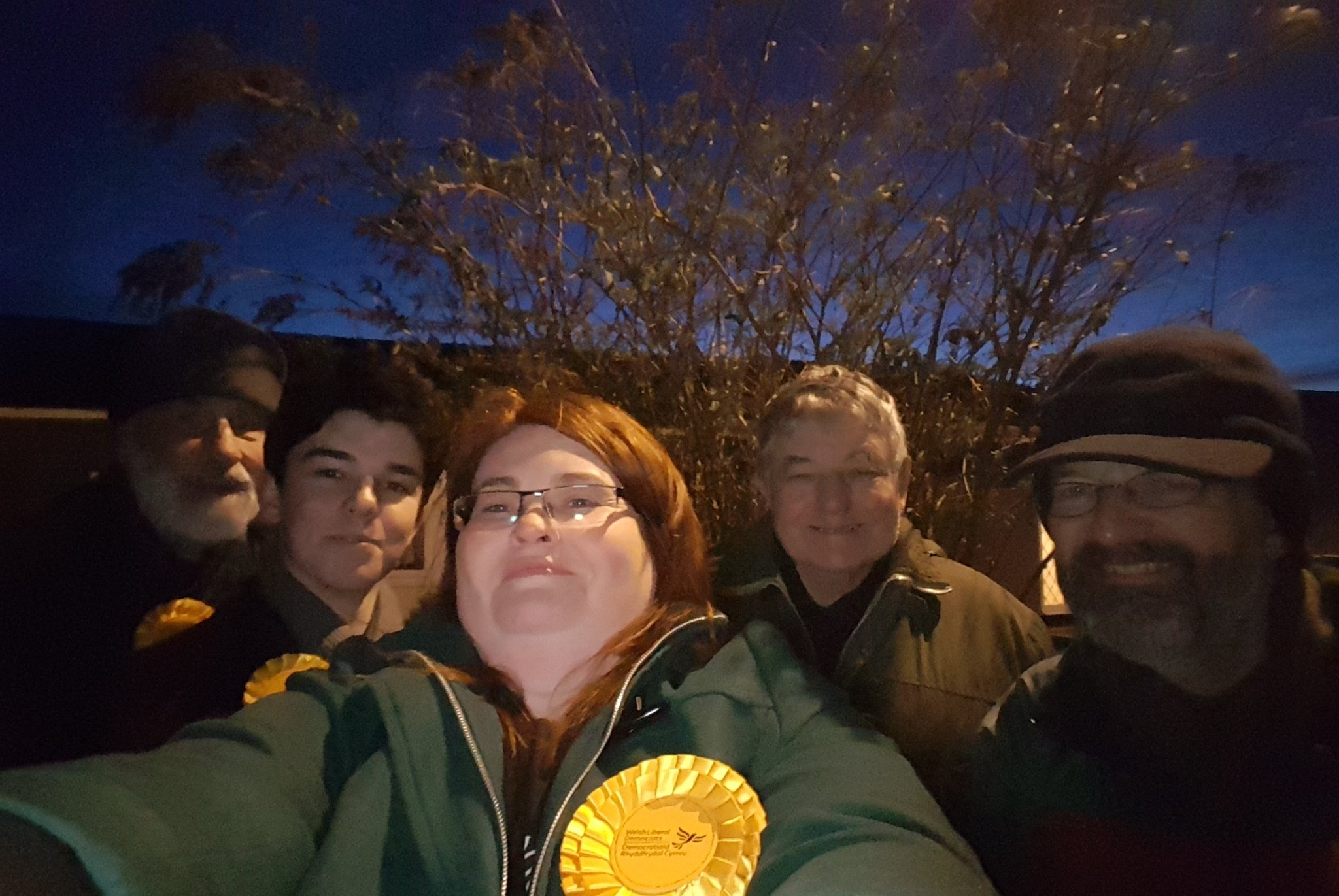
Donna Lalek and the Welsh Liberal Democrats on polling day.

== Candidates ==
Welsh Labour announced that it would be drawing up a shortlist of candidates in advance of a ballot of local members. Jack Sargeant, the son of the former AM Carl Sargeant, announced that he was putting his name forward for selection. He cited a desire to continue his father's work in the constituency. Also on Labour's shortlist were Flintshire County Councillor Carolyn Thomas and Saltney Town Councillor Hannah Jones. Jack Sargeant was selected as the Labour candidate on 3 January 2018, reportedly winning over 50% of the vote.

The Welsh Conservatives announced former district nurse and social worker Sarah Atherton as their candidate on 18 December 2017. At the 2019 General Election, Atherton was elected as MP for the nearby constituency of Wrexham, becoming the first Conservative ever to win the seat.

UKIP stated that they would not field a candidate if Jack Sargeant was chosen as the Labour candidate. The seat had been their top target two years previously. Following Jack Sargeant’s nomination as the Labour candidate on 3 January 2018 UKIP issued no further statement, but as expected no UKIP candidate appeared on the final list of candidates following the closure of nominations on 10 January 2018.

Plaid Cymru announced Wrexham County Borough Councillor Carrie Harper as their candidate on 3 January 2018.

The Welsh Liberal Democrats announced bank worker and local Community Councillor Donna Lalek as their candidate on 21 December 2017.

The Wales Green Party announced Duncan Rees as their candidate on 4 January 2018.

Nominations closed at 4 pm on 10 January 2018. A total of five candidates were nominated for the election.

== Result ==
The Labour Party held the seat with an increased majority.

2018 Alyn and Deeside by-election
Party	Candidate	Votes	%	±%
Labour	Jack Sargeant	11,267	60.7	+15.0
Conservative	Sarah Atherton	4,722	25.4	+4.4
Liberal Democrats	Donna Lalek	1,176	6.3	+1.8
Plaid Cymru	Carrie Harper	1,059	5.7	−3.3
Green	Duncan Rees	353	1.9	−0.5
Majority		6,545	35.3	+10.6
Turnout		18,577	29.1	−5.9
Labour hold		Swing	+5.3	

== Previous result ==
Welsh Assembly Election 2016: Alyn and Deeside
Party	Candidate	Votes	%	±%
Labour	Carl Sargeant	9,922	45.7	−6.9
Conservative	Mike Gibbs	4,558	21.0	−7.1
UKIP	Michelle Brown	3,765	17.4	+17.4
Plaid Cymru	Jacqueline Hurst	1,944	9.0	+1.4
Liberal Democrats	Peter Williams	980	4.5	−3.1
Green	Martin Bennewith	527	2.4	+2.4
Majority		5,364	24.7	+0.2
Turnout		21,696	35.0	−2.0
Labour hold		Swing	+0.1	
