= Caernarfon (Assembly constituency) =

Welsh Assembly constituency (1999–2007)

Coordinates: 52.976°N 4.308°W

- Former county constituency for the Welsh Assembly

- Caernarfon shown within the North Wales electoral region and the region shown within Wales

Former county constituency
- Created: 1999
- Abolished: 2007
- Preserved county: Gwynedd
- Created from: Caernarfon
- Replaced by: Arfon and Dwyfor Meirionnydd

Caernarfon was a constituency of the National Assembly for Wales from 1999 to 2007. It was one of nine constituencies in the North Wales electoral region until the abolition of the seat. The constituency elected one Assembly Member by the first past the post method, while the North Wales region elected four additional members, to produce a degree of proportional representation for the area as a whole.

== Boundaries ==
The constituency was created for the first election to the Assembly, in 1999, with the name and boundaries of the Caernarfon Westminster constituency. It was entirely within the preserved county of Gwynedd.

The other eight constituencies of the region were Alyn and Deeside, Clwyd West, Clwyd South, Conwy, Delyn, Vale of Clwyd, Wrexham and Ynys Môn.

The constituency was abolished at the 2007 election. Part of the constituency then joined the new Arfon constituency, and part the new Dwyfor Meirionnydd constituency, both constituencies entirely within the preserved county of Gwynedd. The Arfon constituency is within the North Wales electoral region. The Dwyfor Meirionnydd constituency is within the Mid and West Wales region.

== Assembly members ==
Election	Member	Party
1999	Dafydd Wigley	Plaid Cymru
2003	Alun Ffred Jones	Plaid Cymru
2007	constituency abolished; see Arfon and Dwyfor Meirionnydd	

== Elections ==
Welsh Assembly Election 2003: Caernarfon
Party	Candidate	Constituency			Regional		
Party	Candidate	Votes	%	±%	Votes	%	±%
Plaid Cymru	Alun Ffred Jones	11,675	55.0	―10.8	10,335	48.6	―10.1
Labour	Martin Eaglestone	5,770	27.2	+4.5	5,127	24.1	+0.7
Conservative	Goronwy Edwards	2,402	11.3	+2.6	2,459	11.6	+1.2
Liberal Democrats	Stephen William Churchman	1,392	6.6	+3.8	1,238	5.8	+1.4
Cymru Annibynnol					760	3.6	New
Green					535	2.5	+0.5
UKIP					433	2.0	New
John Marek Independent Party					299	1.4	New
Communist					54	0.3	±0.0
ProLife Alliance					33	0.2	New
Majority		5,905	27.8	―15.3			
Turnout		21,239	45.0	―15.7			
Plaid Cymru hold		Swing	―7.7				

Welsh Assembly Election 1999: Caernarfon
Party	Candidate	Constituency			List		
Party	Candidate	Votes	%	±%	Votes	%	±%
Plaid Cymru	Dafydd Wigley	18,748	65.8	N/A	16,611	58.7	N/A
Labour	Tom Jones	6,475	22.7	N/A	6,648	23.4	N/A
Conservative	Bronwen Naish	2,464	8.7	N/A	2,958	10.4	N/A
Liberal Democrats	David Shankland	791	2.8	N/A	1,237	4.4	N/A
Green					562	2.0	N/A
Socialist Alliance					108	0.4	N/A
Natural Law					104	0.4	N/A
Communist					87	0.3	N/A
Rhuddlan Debt Protest Campaign					19	0.1	N/A
Majority		12,273	43.1	N/A			
Turnout		28,748	60.5	N/A			
Plaid Cymru win (new seat)							

2003 Electorate: 47,173
Regional ballots rejected: 259

== See also ==
- North Wales (National Assembly for Wales electoral region)
- National Assembly for Wales constituencies and electoral regions
