= Ynys Môn (Senedd constituency) =

Senedd constituency (1999–2026)

Coordinates: 53.284°N 4.361°W

- Former Senedd county constituency for the Senedd

- Ynys Môn shown within the North Wales electoral region and the region shown within Wales

Former Senedd county constituency
- Created: 1999
- Abolished: 2026
- Party: Plaid Cymru
- MS: Rhun ap Iorwerth
- Preserved county: Gwynedd

Ynys Môn was a constituency of the Senedd. It elected one Member of the Senedd by the first past the post method of election. Ynys Môn was also one of nine constituencies in the North Wales electoral region, which elected four additional members, in addition to nine constituency members, to produce a degree of proportional representation for the region as a whole.

It was represented from 1999 by Ieuan Wyn Jones, the former leader of Plaid Cymru. Jones resigned from the Assembly on 20 June 2013, triggering a by-election, which was held on 1 August 2013. Plaid Cymru's candidate Rhun ap Iorwerth comfortably had held the seat for the party with a majority of over 9000 votes.

== Boundaries ==
Map of 1999–2026 boundaries

The constituency was created for the first election to the Assembly, in 1999, with the name and boundaries of the Ynys Môn Westminster constituency. It was made up of the whole of the county of Anglesey which resides entirely within the preserved county of Gwynedd.

As created in 1999, the North Wales region included the constituencies of Alyn and Deeside, Caernarfon, Clwyd West, Clwyd South, Conwy, Delyn, Vale of Clwyd, Wrexham and Ynys Môn. From the 2007 Assembly election the region included Aberconwy, Alyn and Deeside, Arfon, Clwyd South, Clwyd West, Delyn, Vale of Clwyd, Wrexham and Ynys Môn.

== Voting ==
In elections for the Senedd, each voter had two votes. The first vote was used to vote for a candidate to become the Assembly Member for the voter's constituency, elected by the first past the post system. The second vote was used to vote for a regional closed party list of candidates. Additional member seats were allocated from the lists by the d'Hondt method, with constituency results being taken into account in the allocation.

== Assembly Members and Members of the Senedd ==
Election	Member	Party
1999	Ieuan Wyn Jones	Plaid Cymru
2013 by-election	Rhun ap Iorwerth	Plaid Cymru

== Elections ==
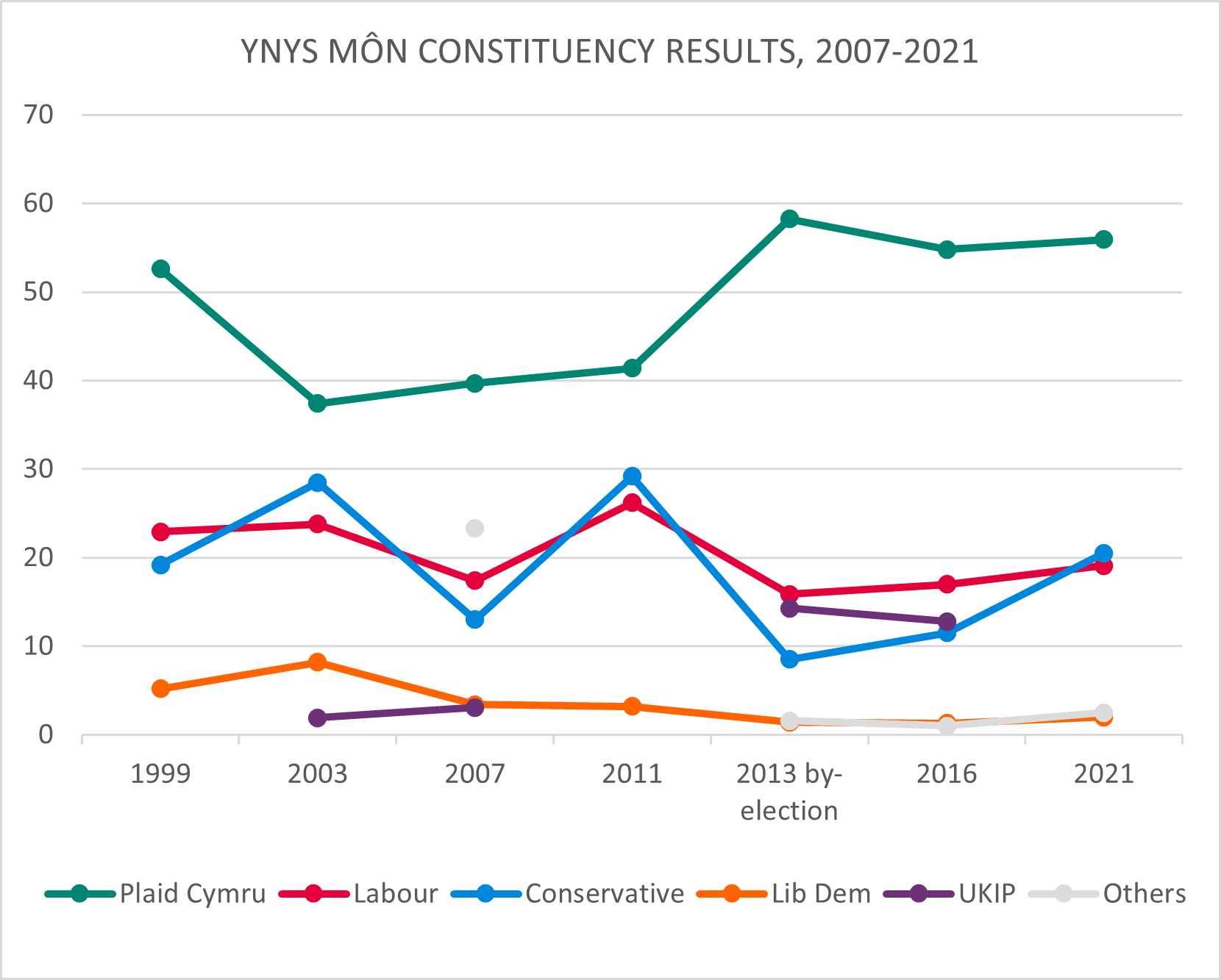
Election results since 1999 (parties who never got >5% counted as others)

=== Elections in the 2020s ===
2021 Senedd election: Ynys Môn
Party	Candidate	Constituency			Regional		
Party	Candidate	Votes	%	±%	Votes	%	±%
Plaid Cymru	Rhun ap Iorwerth (Note: Incumbent member for this constituency)	15,506	55.9	+1.1	11,892	42.7	―1.3
Conservative	Lyn Hudson	5,689	20.5	+9.0	6,199	22.3	+8.6
Labour	Sam Egelstaff	5,300	19.1	+2.1	6,546	23.5	+5.1
Reform	Emmett Jenner	692	2.5	New	352	1.26	New
Liberal Democrats	Christopher Jones	547	2.0	+0.7	478	1.7	―0.6
Abolish					739	2.7	―1.6
Green					734	2.6	+0.3
UKIP					371	1.3	―12.4
Gwlad					202	0.7	New
Freedom Alliance (UK)					122	0.4	New
Communist					77	0.3	±0.0
Propel					50	0.2	New
TUSC					14	0.1	New
Independent	Michelle Brown				13	0.1	New
Majority		10,206	35.4	―2.4			
Turnout		27,734					
Plaid Cymru hold		Swing					

=== Elections in the 2010s ===
Welsh Assembly Election 2016: Ynys Môn
Party	Candidate	Constituency			Regional		
Party	Candidate	Votes	%	±%	Votes	%	±%
Plaid Cymru	Rhun ap Iorwerth	13,788	54.8	+13.4	11,015	44.0	+8.2
Labour	Julia Dobson	4,278	17.0	―9.2	4,598	18.4	―4.7
UKIP	Simon Wall	3,212	12.8	N/A	3,417	13.7	+7.8
Conservative	Clay Theakston	2,904	11.5	―17.7	3,430	13.7	―10.7
Green	Gerry Wolff	389	1.5	New	577	2.3	+0.3
Liberal Democrats	Thomas Crofts	334	1.3	―1.9	578	2.3	±0.0
Independent	Daniel ap Eifion Jones	262	1.0	New			
Abolish					1,066	4.3	New
Monster Raving Loony					146	0.6	New
Association of Welsh Independents					94	0.4	New
Communist					63	0.3	+0.1
Mark Young - Independent					48	0.2	New
Majority		9,510	37.8	+25.6			
Turnout		25,167	50.0	+1.4			
Plaid Cymru hold		Swing					

By-election 2013: Ynys Môn
Party	Candidate	Votes	%	±%
Plaid Cymru	Rhun ap Iorwerth	12,601	58.24	+16.8
Labour	Tal Michael	3,435	15.88	―10.3
UKIP	Nathan Gill	3,099	14.3	New
Conservative	Neil Fairlamb	1,843	8.5	―20.7
Socialist Labour	Kathrine Jones	348	1.6	New
Liberal Democrats	Stephen Churchman	309	1.4	―1.8
Majority		9,166	42.3	+30.1
Turnout		21,635	42.4	―6.2
Plaid Cymru hold		Swing	+13.58	

Welsh Assembly Election 2011: Ynys Môn
Party	Candidate	Constituency			Regional		
Party	Candidate	Votes	%	±%	Votes	%	±%
Plaid Cymru	Ieuan Wyn Jones	9,969	41.4	+1.7	8,620	35.8	―6.2
Conservative	Paul Williams	7,032	29.2	+16.2	5,875	24.4	+3.3
Labour	Joe Lock	6,307	26.2	+8.8	5,552	23.1	+3.5
Liberal Democrats	Rhys Taylor	759	3.2	―0.2	554	2.3	―0.4
UKIP					1,431	5.9	+1.3
Green					481	2.0	―2.6
Socialist Labour					732	3.0	+2.1
BNP					539	2.2	―1.3
Weyman - Independent					105	0.4	New
Welsh Christian					104	0.4	―0.2
Communist					59	0.2	―0.1
Majority		2,937	12.2	―4.2			
Turnout		24,067	48.6	―3.2			
Plaid Cymru hold		Swing	―7.3				

Regional ballots rejected at the count: 144

=== Elections in the 2000s ===
Welsh Assembly Election 2007: Ynys Môn
Party	Candidate	Constituency			Regional		
Party	Candidate	Votes	%	±%	Votes	%	±%
Plaid Cymru	Ieuan Wyn Jones	10,653	39.7	+2.3	11,167	42.0	+7.1
Independent	Peter Rogers	6,261	23.3	New			
Labour	Jonathan Austin	4,681	17.4	―6.4	5,212	19.6	―5.6
Conservative	James Roach	3,480	13.0	―15.5	5,612	21.1	―2.9
Liberal Democrats	Mandi Abrahams	912	3.4	-4.8	723	2.7	―6.8
UKIP	Francis Wykes	833	3.1	+2.2	1,221	4.6	+2.1
Green					1,217	4.6	+2.6
BNP					934	3.5	New
Socialist Labour					234	0.9	New
Welsh Christian					148	0.6	New
Communist					77	0.3	New
CPA					50	0.2	New
Majority		4,392	16.4	+6.5			
Turnout		26,820	51.8	+1.5			
Plaid Cymru hold		Swing					

Welsh Assembly Election 2003: Ynys Môn
Party	Candidate	Constituency			Regional		
Party	Candidate	Votes	%	±%	Votes	%	±%
Plaid Cymru	Ieuan Wyn Jones	9,452	37.4	―15.2	8,765	34.9	―12.1
Conservative	Peter Rogers	7,197	28.5	+9.3	6,025	24.0	+5.0
Labour	William Gerwyn Jones	6,024	23.8	+0.9	6,342	25.2	―0.4
Liberal Democrats	Nicholas Bennett	2,089	8.2	+3.0	2,381	9.5	+3.7
UKIP	Francis Charles Wykes	481	1.9	New	616	2.5	New
Green					509	2.0	Unknown
John Marek Independent Party					219	0.9	New
Cymru Annibynnol					171	0.7	New
Communist					58	0.2	Unknown
ProLife Alliance					33	0.1	New
Majority		2,255	8.9	―20.8			
Turnout		25,243	50.3	―9.3			
Plaid Cymru hold		Swing					

2003 Electorate: 49,998
Regional ballots rejected: 239

=== Elections in the 1990s ===
Welsh Assembly Election 1999: Ynys Môn
Party	Candidate	Constituency			Regional		
Party	Candidate	Votes	%	±%	Votes	%	±%
Plaid Cymru	Ieuan Wyn Jones	16,469	52.6	N/A	14,664	47.0	N/A
Labour	Albert Owen	7,181	22.9	N/A	7,982	25.6	N/A
Conservative	Peter Rogers	6,031	19.2	N/A	5,930	19.0	N/A
Liberal Democrats	James Clarke	1,630	5.2	N/A	1,816	5.8	N/A
Green					Unknown	Unknown	N/A
Rhuddlan Debt Protest Campaign					Unknown	Unknown	N/A
United Socialist					Unknown	Unknown	N/A
Communist					Unknown	Unknown	N/A
Natural Law					Unknown	Unknown	N/A
Above list parties					784	2.5	N/A
Majority		9,288	29.7				
Turnout		31,311	59.6				
Plaid Cymru win (new seat)							

== See also ==
- North Wales (Senedd electoral region)
- Senedd constituencies and electoral regions
