= Janet Haworth =

Welsh Conservative politician

Member of the Welsh Assembly for North Wales
- In office 27 May 2015 – 6 April 2016
- Preceded by: Antoinette Sandbach
- Succeeded by: Michelle Brown

Personal details
- Born: December 1949 (age 76)
- Party: Conservative (2004–present); Liberal Democrats (until 2004)

Janet Elizabeth Haworth (born December 1949) is a Welsh Conservative politician who was a Member of the Welsh Assembly (AM) for the North Wales Region between 2015 and 2016.

== Background ==
Haworth ran a guest house from 2005 with her partner, Dennis Oliver. She worked for Shell in Aberdeenshire until she retired to Llandudno in about 2003, and became a town and county councillor.

== Political career ==
=== Assembly Member ===
At the May 2011 election to the National Assembly for Wales, she was in third place on the Conservative list for the North Wales region. The Conservatives won two seats, which meant that Haworth was not elected. Antoinette Sandbach, who held one of the two Conservative list seats, was elected to the House of Commons at the 2015 general election. Sandbach announced her resignation from the National Assembly on 8 May 2015. As the next available candidate on the party list from 2011, Haworth succeeded her as an assembly member. She resigned as a Councillor in October 2015 after facing criticisms for her lack of attendance in council meetings following her appointment as an Assembly Member.

Haworth was defeated at the 2016 Assembly election.

== See also ==
- List of Welsh AMs/MSs with the shortest service

Senedd
Preceded by Antoinette Sandbach	Assembly Member for North Wales; 2015–2016	Succeeded by Michelle Brown
