= 2013 Ynys Môn by-election =

Welsh Assembly by-election

- 1 August 2013

The Ynys Môn seat in the Welsh Assembly. Triggered by resignation of incumbent
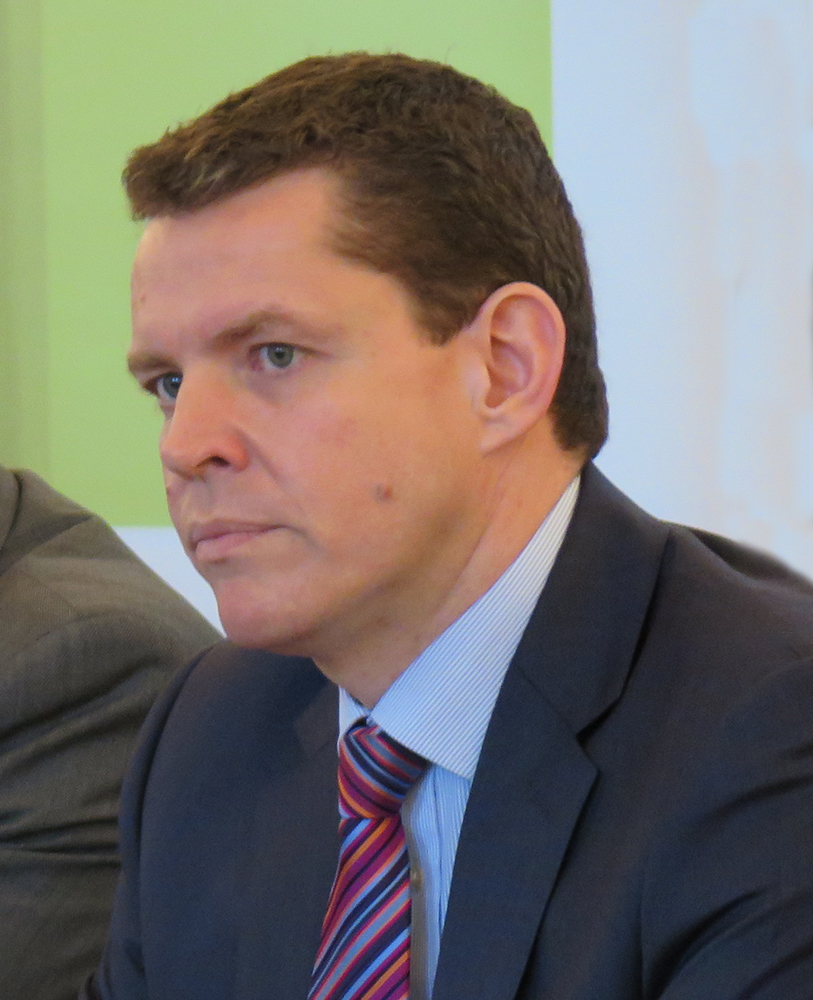

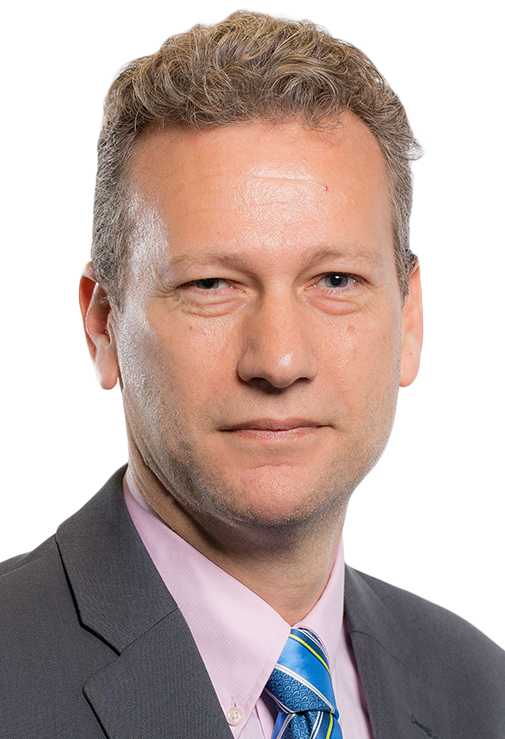
	First party	Second party
		Lab
Candidate	Rhun ap Iorwerth	Tal Michael
Party	Plaid Cymru	Labour
Popular vote	12,601	3,435
Percentage	58.2%	15.9%
Swing	▲16.8%	▼10.3%
	Third party	Fourth party
		Con
Candidate	Nathan Gill	Neil Fairlamb
Party	UKIP	Conservative
Popular vote	3,099	1,843
Percentage	14.3%	8.5%
Swing	New party	▼20.7%
- Map showing the Ynys Môn Assembly constituency within the North Wales electoral region within Wales.
AM before election
Ieuan Wyn Jones
Plaid Cymru
Subsequent AM
Rhun ap Iorwerth
Plaid Cymru

A by-election for the Welsh Assembly constituency of Ynys Môn was held on 1 August 2013, The by-election was triggered following the resignation on 20 June 2013 of its sitting Assembly Member, Ieuan Wyn Jones.

The election was the third Assembly by-election to be held since its formation in 1999, and the first for over seven years (the previous contest being at Blaenau Gwent in June 2006).

Prior to the by-election, the governing Labour Party held exactly half the Assembly seats, meaning a gain for that party (who have held the equivalent seat in the House of Commons since 2001) would have given the Welsh Labour government a two-seat majority.

== Election ==
Six candidates were nominated for the election.

== Result ==
Plaid Cymru held the seat with a greatly increased majority.

2013 Ynys Môn by-election
Party	Candidate	Votes	%	±%
Plaid Cymru	Rhun ap Iorwerth	12,601	58.24	+16.8
Labour	Tal Michael	3,435	15.88	−10.3
UKIP	Nathan Gill	3,099	14.32	New
Conservative	Neil Fairlamb	1,843	8.52	−20.7
Socialist Labour	Kathrine Jones	348	1.61	New
Liberal Democrats	Stephen Churchman	309	1.43	−1.8
Majority		9,166	42.34	+30.1
Turnout		21,635	42.4	−6.2
Plaid Cymru hold		Swing	+13.58	

== Previous result ==
2011 Welsh Assembly election: Ynys Môn
Party	Candidate	Votes	%	±%
Plaid Cymru	Ieuan Wyn Jones	9,969	41.4	+1.7
Conservative	Paul Williams	7,032	29.2	+16.2
Labour	Joe Lock	6,307	26.2	+8.8
Liberal Democrats	Rhys Taylor	759	3.2	−0.2
Majority		2,937	12.2	−4.2
Turnout		24,067	48.6	−3.2
Plaid Cymru hold		Swing	−7.3	
