= Clwyd South (Senedd constituency) =

Senedd constituency (1999–2026)

Coordinates: 52°58′45″N 3°06′20″W

Clwyd South De Clwyd
- Former Senedd county constituency for the Senedd

- Clwyd South shown within the North Wales electoral region and the region shown within Wales

Former Senedd county constituency
- Created: 1999
- Abolished: 2026
- Party: Labour
- MS: Ken Skates
- Preserved county: Clwyd and Powys

Clwyd South (Welsh: De Clwyd) was a constituency of the Senedd. It elected one Member of the Senedd by the first past the post method of election. Also, however, it was one of nine constituencies in the North Wales electoral region, which elected four additional members, in addition to nine constituency members, to produce a degree of proportional representation for the region as a whole.

== Boundaries ==
Map of 2007–2026 boundaries

The constituency was created for the first election to the then Assembly, in 1999, with the name and boundaries of the Clwyd South Westminster constituency. It is mostly within the preserved county of Clwyd and partly within the preserved county of Powys.

For the 2007 Assembly election, however, it became a constituency entirely within Clwyd. Part of its area was transferred to the Montgomeryshire constituency, in Powys. Also, part of its area was transferred to another Clwyd constituency, Clwyd West. For Westminster purposes, the same boundary changes became effective at the 2010 United Kingdom general election.

As created in 1999, the North Wales region included the constituencies of Alyn and Deeside, Caernarfon, Clwyd West, Clwyd South, Conwy, Delyn, Vale of Clwyd, Wrexham and Ynys Môn. From the 2007 election the region included Aberconwy, Alyn and Deeside, Arfon, Clwyd South, Clwyd West, Delyn, Vale of Clwyd, Wrexham and Ynys Môn.

For the period 1999 to 2007, the Clwyd South constituency was described as consisting of electoral divisions as follows:

- Within Denbighshire:
  - Corwen, Llandrillo and Llangollen
- Within Wrexham:
  - Bronington, Brymbo, Bryn Cefn, Cefn, Chirk North, Chirk South, Coedpoeth, Dyffryn Ceiriog/Ceiriog Valley, Esclusham, Gwenfro, Johnstown, Llangollen Rural, Marchwiel, Minera, New Broughton, Overton, Pant, Penycae, Penycae and Ruabon South, Plas Madoc, Ponciau and Ruabon

== Voting ==
In general elections for the Senedd, each voter had two votes. The first vote was used to vote for a candidate to become the Member of the Senedd for the voter's constituency, elected by the first past the post system. The second vote was used to vote for a regional closed party list of candidates. Additional member seats were allocated from the lists by the D'Hondt method, with constituency results being taken into account in the allocation.

== Members of the Senedd ==
Election	Member	Party	Portrait
1999	Karen Sinclair	Labour	
2011	Ken Skates	Labour	

== Constituency election results ==
=== Elections in the 2020s ===
2021 Senedd election: Clwyd South
Party	Candidate	Constituency			Regional		
Party	Candidate	Votes	%	±%	Votes	%	±%
Labour	Ken Skates (Note: Incumbent member for this constituency)	10,488	43.2	+7.7	8,753	36.2	+4.9
Conservative	Barbara Hughes	7,535	31.1	+9.2	7,472	30.9	+10.7
Plaid Cymru	Llyr Gruffydd (Note: Incumbent member on the party list, or for another constituency)	4,094	16.9	-0.5	4,533	18.8	+0.2
Liberal Democrats	Leena Farhat	730	3.0	-7.3	715	3.0	-5.9
Abolish	Jonathon Harrington	599	2.5	New	942	3.9	-0.4
UKIP	Jeanette Bassford-Barton	522	2.2	-10.6	387	1.6	-11.1
Reform UK	Mandy Jones	277	1.1	New	224	0.9	New
Green					730	3.0	+0.9
Freedom Alliance (UK)					119	0.5	New
Gwlad					106	0.4	New
Propel					54	0.2	New
Communist					47	0.2	-0.1
Independent	Michelle Brown				44	0.2	New
TUSC					21	0.1	New
Majority		2,953	11.1	−2.5			
Turnout		24,245	44.43	+3.5			
Labour hold		Swing					

=== Elections in the 2010s ===
Welsh Assembly Election 2016: Clwyd South
Party	Candidate	Constituency			Regional		
Party	Candidate	Votes	%	±%	Votes	%	±%
Labour	Ken Skates	7,862	35.5	-6.9	6,915	31.3	-6.2
Conservative	Simon Baynes	4,846	21.9	-7.3	4,472	20.2	-4.0
Plaid Cymru	Mabon ap Gwynfor	3,861	17.4	-1.2	4,106	18.6	+1.5
UKIP	Mandy Jones	2,827	12.8	New	2,802	12.7	+8.4
Liberal Democrats	Aled Roberts	2,289	10.3	+0.4	1,969	8.9	+0.9
Green	Duncan Rees	474	2.1	New	520	2.4	±0.0
Abolish					951	4.3	New
Monster Raving Loony					132	0.6	New
Association of Welsh Independents					98	0.4	New
Communist					65	0.3	+0.1
Mark Young - Independent					64	0.3	New
Majority		3,016	13.6	+0.4			
Turnout		22,159	40.9	+4.0			
Labour hold		Swing	+0.2				

Welsh Assembly Election 2011: Clwyd South
Party	Candidate	Constituency			Regional		
Party	Candidate	Votes	%	±%	Votes	%	±%
Labour	Ken Skates	8,500	42.4	+7.3	7,525	37.5	+8.1
Conservative	Paul Rogers	5,841	29.2	-0.1	4,853	24.2	-1.9
Plaid Cymru	Mabon ap Gwynfor	3,719	18.6	-1.4	3,435	17.1	-1.4
Liberal Democrats	Bruce Roberts	1,977	9.9	+0.5	1,600	8.0	-0.7
UKIP					867	4.3	-0.1
BNP					535	2.7	-4.4
Green					486	2.4	-0.4
Socialist Labour					454	2.3	+0.7
Welsh Christian					159	0.8	+0.2
Weyman - Independent					96	0.5	New
Communist					50	0.2	-0.1
Majority		2,659	13.2	+7.4			
Turnout		20,037	36.9	−1.0			
Labour hold		Swing	+3.75				

Regional ballots rejected: 172

=== Elections in the 2000s ===
Welsh Assembly Election 2007: Clwyd South
Party	Candidate	Constituency			Regional		
Party	Candidate	Votes	%	±%	Votes	%	±%
Labour	Karen Sinclair	6,838	35.1	-1.4	5,725	29.4	-3.1
Conservative	John Bell	5,719	29.3	+10.3	5,092	26.1	+7.2
Plaid Cymru	Nia Davies	3,894	20.0	-1.0	3,602	18.5	-0.8
Liberal Democrats	Frank Biggs	1,838	9.4	+0.5	1,702	8.7	-0.3
UKIP	David Rowlands	1,209	6.2	+3.5	857	4.4	+2.0
BNP					1,384	7.1	New
Green					546	2.8	+0.7
Socialist Labour					315	1.6	New
Welsh Christian					110	0.6	New
Communist					65	0.3	New
CPA					94	0.5	New
Majority		1,119	5.8	−9.7			
Turnout		19,498	37.9	+3.5			
Labour hold		Swing					

Welsh Assembly Election 2003: Clwyd South
Party	Candidate	Constituency			Regional		
Party	Candidate	Votes	%	±%	Votes	%	±%
Labour	Karen Sinclair	6,814	36.5	-5.7	6,057	32.5	
Plaid Cymru	Dyfed W. Edwards	3,923	21.0	-4.3	3,604	19.3	
Conservative	Albert M.Fox	3,548	19.0	-0.1	3,524	18.9	
Independent	Marc V. Jones	2,210	11.8	New			
Liberal Democrats	Derek W.L. Burnham	1,666	8.9	-2.3	1,571	8.4	
UKIP	Edwina E. Theunissen	501	2.7	New	451	2.4	
John Marek Independent Party					2,850	15.3	
Green					391	2.1	
Cymru Annibynnol					102	0.5	
Communist					52	0.3	
ProLife Alliance					26	0.1	
Majority		2,891	15.5	−1.4			
Turnout		18,662	34.4	−6.1			
Labour hold		Swing	-0.7				

2003 Electorate: 53,452
Regional ballots rejected: 230

=== Elections in the 1990s ===
Welsh Assembly Election 1999: Clwyd South
Party	Candidate	Constituency			Regional		
Party	Candidate	Votes	%	±%	Votes	%	±%
Labour	Karen Sinclair	9,196	42.2	N/A	8,706	40.1	N/A
Plaid Cymru	Hywel Williams	5,511	25.3	N/A	5,866	27.0	N/A
Conservative	David R. Jones	4,167	19.1	N/A	4,010	18.5	N/A
Liberal Democrats	Derek W.L. Burnham	2,432	11.2	N/A	2,155	9.9	N/A
Independent	Maurice Jones	508	2.3	N/A			
United Socialist					166	0.8	N/A
Green					Unknown	Unknown	N/A
Rhuddlan Debt Protest Campaign					Unknown	Unknown	N/A
Communist					Unknown	Unknown	N/A
Natural Law					Unknown	Unknown	N/A
Above list parties					802	3.7	N/A
Majority		3,685	16.9	N/A			
Turnout		21,814	40.5	N/A			
Labour win (new seat)							
