= Carolyn Thomas =

Welsh politician

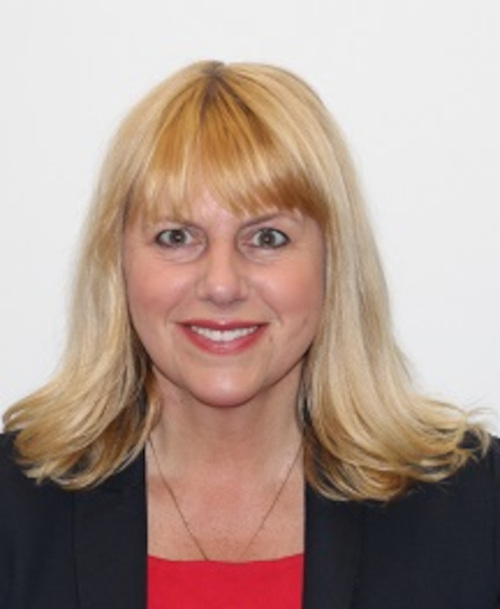
- Thomas in 2021

Member of the Senedd for North Wales
- In office 6 May 2021 – 7 April 2026
- Preceded by: Multi-member constituency
- Succeeded by: Constituency abolished

Personal details
- Born: 3 November 1965 (age 60) Cheshire, England
- Party: Labour and Co-operative (Since 2015)
- Other political affiliations: Independent (2008 - 2015)
- Occupation: Postal worker
- Website: Official website

Carolyn Thomas (born 1965) is a Welsh Labour and Co-operative politician who was a Member of the Senedd (MS) for North Wales from 2021 to 2026.

== Early career and election ==
Before being elected to the Senedd, Thomas worked as a postal worker until 2020 and was a member of the Communication Workers Union (CWU). In 2008, she was elected to Flintshire County Council as an independent representing Treuddyn before joining Labour in 2015. In 2019, Thomas became Deputy Leader of the council.

Whilst Deputy Leader, Thomas delivered a petition to the Senedd, calling for buses to be run 'for people, not profit'. The petition asked the Welsh Government to regulate commercial bus companies and allow local authorities to run their own bus services.

Thomas was selected to lead the North Wales regional list for Labour in the 2021 Senedd election and was elected as Labour's first ever Member of the Senedd for the North Wales region.

== Parliamentary career ==
In February 2022, Thomas was one of three Labour MSs to support introducing rent controls in Wales. Thomas is a supporter of public ownership. In August 2022, she called for energy companies to be nationalised in response to increased bills.

Since being elected, Thomas has spoken of her experience of working as a postal worker in the Royal Mail following its privatisation in 2013. She has called for Royal Mail to be returned to public ownership, saying that privatisation had 'wrecked' the business because of an 'unhinged profit-obsessed mantra'.

Amidst the Gaza war, Thomas supported an opposition motion from Plaid Cymru calling for a ceasefire in Gaza, triggering a debate and vote in the Senedd, which subsequently backed calls for a ceasefire.

Thomas has been an outspoken critic of carbon capture and storage, and opposed plans for an underground carbon capture pipeline being built through North Wales, describing it as an 'exhaust pipe' which will 'serve to entrench fossil fuel reliance'.

In the 2026 Senedd election, she was an unsuccessful candidate in the Clwyd constituency.

== Personal life ==
Thomas is married and has three children.
