= Michelle Brown (politician) =

British politician

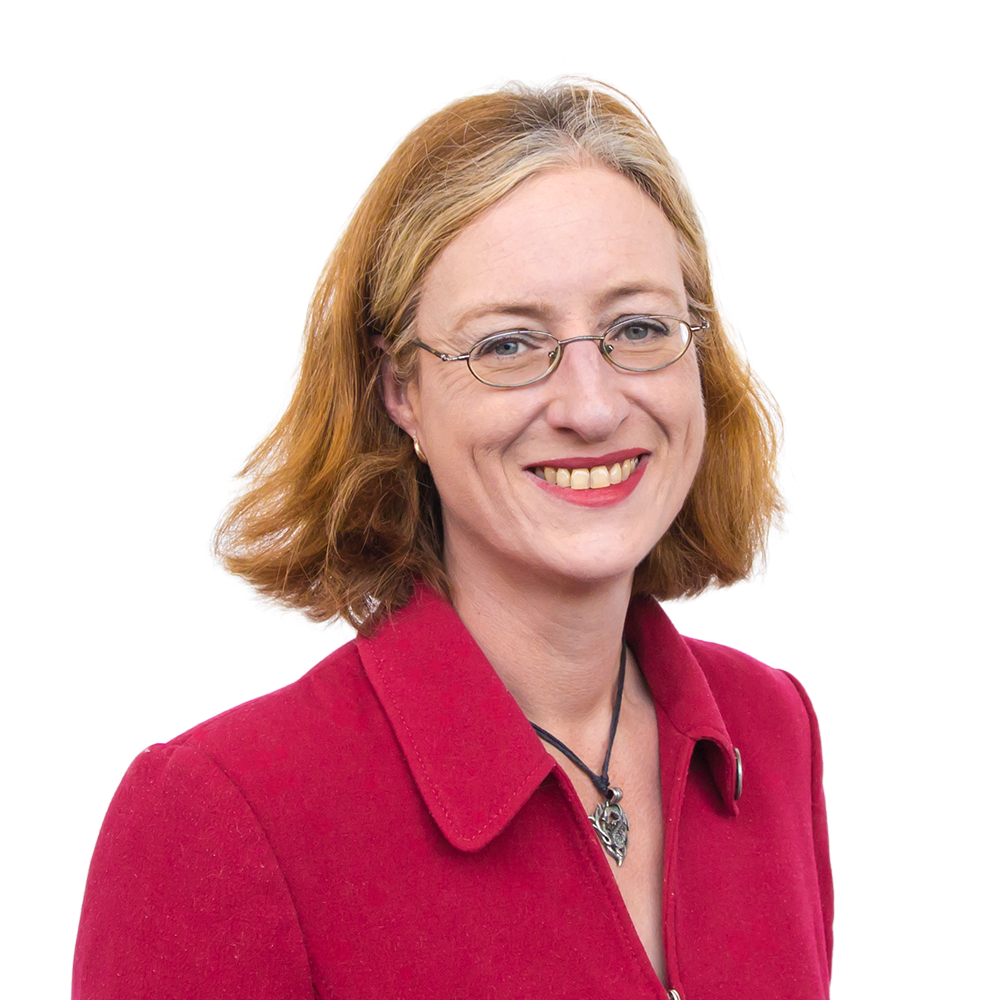

Member of the Senedd for North Wales
- In office 5 May 2016 – 29 April 2021

Personal details
- Born: 30 December 1969 (age 56) Mostyn, Wales
- Party: Independent (2019–present)
- Other political affiliations: UK Independence Party (until 2019)
- Education: University of Staffordshire

Michelle Margaret Freda Brown (born 30 December 1969) is a British lawyer and former politician who was a Member of the Senedd (MS) for North Wales from 2016 to 2021. In March 2019 she resigned from the UK Independence Party (UKIP) to become an independent.

== Background ==
Michelle Brown grew up in Mostyn and was educated at St Richard Gwyn Catholic High School, Flint, and at convents in Holywell and Holyhead. She graduated with a bachelor's and master's degree in Law and a Post Graduate Diploma in Legal Practice from University of Staffordshire.

== Political career ==
=== Member of the Senedd ===
At the 2016 National Assembly for Wales election, Brown stood as the UK Independence Party's candidate for Alyn and Deeside, finishing third with 3,765 votes (17.4%). She was also the second-placed candidate on the party list for the North Wales region, winning a seat alongside UKIP Wales leader Nathan Gill.

Following her election to the Assembly, she voted for Neil Hamilton as leader of the UKIP group in the Welsh Assembly and against Nathan Gill.

==== 2017 Controversies ====
In February 2017 Future Inns, a hotel in Cardiff Bay, accused Brown of smoking "recreational drugs" in her hotel room. The hotel stated the room could not be used for 24 hours and issued a £250 bill to Brown for the cleaning cost.

In July 2017, a recording of a telephone conversation emerged, in which Brown was heard describing the Labour MP for Streatham, Chuka Umunna, as a "fucking coconut". The call, made in May 2016 to her then senior adviser Nigel Williams, was recorded clandestinely. Brown said her language was "inappropriate" and apologised, although also stating that she "was using language that friends and colleagues often do when chatting to each other". However, Brown stated that she stood by her comments that Umunna had "as much understanding of an ordinary black man's experience as I have". Brown was also recorded referring to Tristram Hunt, who was then Labour MP for Stoke-on-Trent Central as a twat. Brown's comments were referred to the assembly's standards commissioner and Labour, Conservative, and Plaid Cymru members called for Brown to be sanctioned. Brown was suspended for a week without pay after an investigation by the assembly's standards committee, a decision which was criticised by Neil Hamilton, leader of the UKIP group in the assembly. It was revealed in July 2017 that the UKIP branch in Delyn which was led by Nigel Williams whom Brown had suspended some weeks earlier for incompetence, had called for her de-selection, accusing her of "abrasive and discourteous" behaviour towards local members who Brown asserted she had never met. UKIP dismissed the letter as written by a "tiny and insignificant group" holding a "long standing grudge" against Ms Brown

==== Other activity ====
In March 2018, she was chosen by the UKIP Assembly group over Hamilton's choice of Gareth Bennett to be their representative on the party National Executive Committee and in May 2018 she backed Caroline Jones to replace Hamilton. Brown expressed regret at Jones leaving the group after Bennett won a ballot of party members intended to settle the group's leadership.

==== Resignation from UKIP ====
In March 2019, Brown resigned from UKIP to become an independent AM, accusing the UKIP group of sexism. According to Wales Online, Brown was told she would not be welcome in the Brexit Party when it formed a Welsh Assembly group in May 2019, an accusation Brown has called "fake news" as she states she never asked to join.

In the 2021 Senedd election, Brown stood for re-election as an independent candidate on the North Wales list, but was unsuccessful, getting only 0.2% of the vote.

Senedd
Preceded by Janet Haworth	Member of the Senedd for North Wales; 2016–2021	Succeeded by Carolyn Thomas
