= List of by-elections to the Senedd =

This is a list of by-elections to the Senedd (Welsh Parliament; Welsh: Senedd Cymru; formerly known as the National Assembly for Wales).

Where seats changed political party at the by-election, the result is highlighted.

| Assembly term | By-election | Date | Incumbent | Party | Winner | Party | Cause | Retained at next election |
|---|---|---|---|---|---|---|---|---|
| 2021–2026 | Caerphilly | 23 October 2025 | Hefin David | Labour | Lindsay Whittle | Plaid Cymru | Death (suicide) | N/A |
| 2016–2021 | Alyn and Deeside | 6 February 2018 | Carl Sargeant | Labour | Jack Sargeant | Labour | Death (suicide) | Yes |
| 2011–2016 | Ynys Môn | 1 August 2013 | Ieuan Wyn Jones | Plaid Cymru | Rhun ap Iorwerth | Plaid Cymru | Resignation to lead the Menai Science Park | Yes |
| 2003–2007 | Blaenau Gwent | 29 June 2006 | Peter Law (Note: Law quit the Labour Party and sat as an independent prior to his death. The by-election was won by his widow, but is classed as an independent gain from Labour.) | Labour | Trish Law | Independent | Death (brain tumour) | Yes |
| 1999–2003 | Swansea East | 27 September 2001 | Val Feld | Labour | Valerie Lloyd | Labour | Death (cancer) | Yes |

== See also ==
- List of by-elections to the Scottish Parliament
- Regional member changes to the Senedd
