= Jack Sargeant (politician) =

Welsh politician and Member of the Senedd

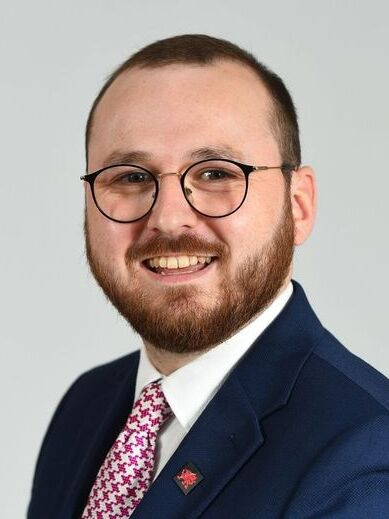
- Official portrait, 2024

Minister for Culture, Skills and Social Partnership (Note: As Minister for Social Partnership from July to September 2024)
- In office 17 July 2024 – 12 May 2026
- First Minister: Vaughan Gething; Eluned Morgan
- Preceded by: Sarah Murphy
- Succeeded by: Cefin Campbell

Member of the Senedd for Alyn and Deeside
- In office 7 February 2018 – 7 April 2026
- Preceded by: Carl Sargeant
- Succeeded by: Constituency abolished

Personal details
- Born: 1994 (age 31–32) Rhuddlan, Flint, Wales
- Party: Welsh Labour
- Relatives: Carl Sargeant (father)
- Website: https://jacksargeant.wales/

Jack Sargeant (born 1994) is a Welsh Labour Party politician who served as Member of the Senedd for Alyn and Deeside from 2018 to 2026. He succeeded his father, following the 2018 Alyn and Deeside by-election. While in the Senedd, he served as Minister for Culture, Skills and Social Partnership from July 2024 until he lost his seat at the 2026 Senedd election.

== Background ==
Sargeant was born in Rhuddlan in 1994 and attended Connah's Quay High School. He studied for an engineering apprenticeship at Deeside College (now Coleg Cambria) before completing a degree at Glyndŵr University in Wrexham in 2016, then working in DRB.

He was elected as MS for Alyn and Deeside at a by-election held on 6 February 2018. He succeeded his father, the previous incumbent Carl Sargeant, who had died in November 2017. At 23 years of age, Jack Sargeant became the youngest ever Assembly Member when he was elected to the National Assembly.

== Campaigns ==
Sargeant is an active campaigner in support of World Suicide Prevention Day, an occasion which is held on 10 September each year. He has launched an initiative called The 84, named after the 84 men who take their own lives each week in the UK.

The initiative is backed by major sports clubs in Wales, including Cardiff City F.C., Swansea City A.F.C., Newport County A.F.C., Wrexham A.F.C. and Connah's Quay Nomads F.C., who all agreed to share suicide prevention messages with the hashtag #ItsOkNotToBeOk to support the campaign. The clubs have also worked to include suicide prevention messages into fixtures, such as including Samaritans in their match day events on the weekend of 14 and 15 September, and holding bucket collections.

Sargeant himself has spoken about the impact of suicide, stating he "sometimes finds it difficult to get up in the morning after losing his father Carl."

He is also a supporter of Parkinson's UK.

== Ministerial career ==
Sargeant was appointed Minister for Social Partnership in July 2024 by First Minister Vaughan Gething, following a cabinet reshuffle as a result of other cabinet resignations and Gething's announcement of resignation. He retained the role under Eluned Morgan, Gething's successor as First Minister, although renamed in September 2024 as Minister for Culture, Skills and Social Partnership, in Morgan's cabinet reshuffle.

Sargeant stood in Fflint Wrecsam in the 2026 Senedd election but was not elected.

== Notes ==
Senedd
Preceded by Carl Sargeant	Member of the Senedd for Alyn and Deeside; 2018 – 2026	Succeeded by seat abolished
Political offices
Preceded by Steffan Lewis	Baby of the House; 2018–2021	Succeeded by Luke Fletcher
