= Fourth Andrew RT Davies shadow cabinet =

Shadow cabinet of Wales (2021–2024)

Andrew RT Davies Shadow Cabinet
- Shadow Cabinet of Wales
- 2021–2024
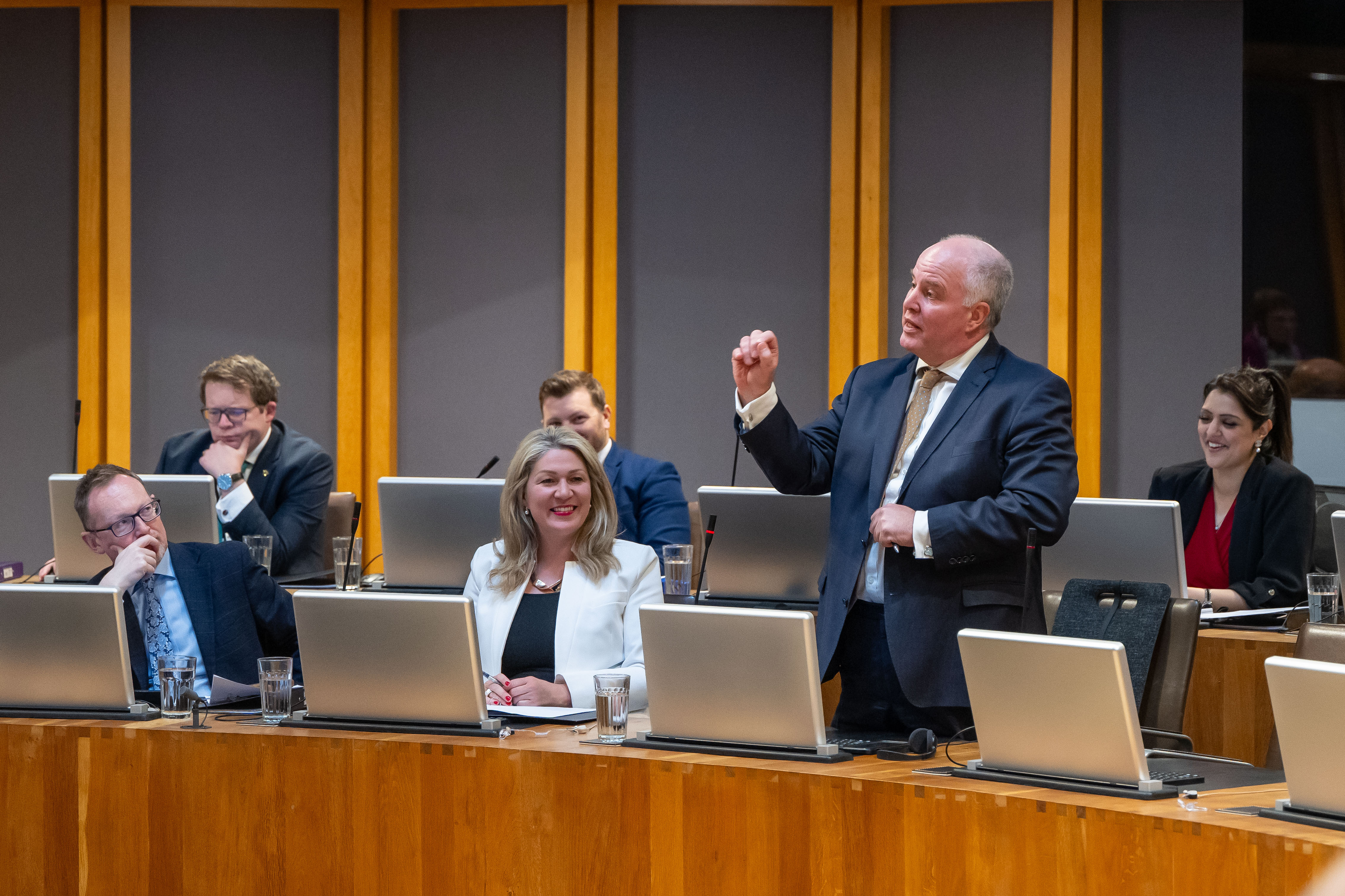
- Davies with members of his shadow cabinet in April 2024
- Date formed: 27 May 2021
- Date dissolved: 5 December 2024

People and organisations
- Monarch: Elizabeth II; Charles III
- Leader of the Opposition: Andrew RT Davies
- Member party: Welsh Conservatives
- Status in legislature: Official Opposition

History
- Incoming formation: 2021 Senedd election
- Outgoing formation: 2024 Welsh Conservatives leadership election
- Legislature term: 6th Senedd
- Predecessor: Third Shadow Cabinet of Andrew RT Davies
- Successor: Shadow Cabinet of Darren Millar

Andrew RT Davies became the Leader of the Opposition in Wales after the 2021 Senedd election, when the Welsh Conservatives became the second largest party in the Senedd, with 16 seats.

RT Davies had previously formed three other Shadow Cabinets, the first from 2011-2016, the second from 2017 to 2018 and the third from January to March 2021.

On 3 December 2024, Davies resigned as leader of the Welsh Conservatives, and was replaced on 5 December by Darren Millar.

== Background ==
RT Davies had become leader of the Welsh Conservatives again, after having served in the post from 2011-2018, after his replacement as leader Paul Davies resigned in January 2021, after having been seen drinking with other politicians on the Senedd estate on 8 and 9 December 2020, at the time believed to be a possible breach of COVID-19 regulations in Wales. RT Davies had formed his third Shadow Cabinet from the 24th, the date he took leadership, but it concluded shortly after, after Nick Ramsay left the Welsh Conservatives to run as an independent, having been deselected by his local Conservative Party. This tied the Welsh Conservatives and Plaid Cymru on 10 seats each, meaning there was no Shadow Cabinet from March until the 2021 Senedd Election.

The Welsh Conservatives won 16 seats in the 2021 Senedd Election a record for the party. Davies said after the election that he would remain in post until the next election in 2026. He later formed his shadow cabinet on the 27 May 2021 with members that left the frontbench after the 'booze gate', Darren Miller and Paul Davies, re-entering the frontbench.

== History ==
On 27 May 2021, RT Davies announced the placements within his new Shadow Cabinet. Paul Davies and Darren Millar, who had both left the Welsh Conservative front bench were re-appointed, with Paul Davies taking the role of Shadow Minister for the Economy, and Millar taking the role of Shadow Minister for the Constitution and North Wales, as well as the role of Chief Whip. Newly elected Peter Fox was appointed as Shadow Minister for Finance, Natasha Asghar was appointed as Shadow Minister for Transport and Technology, Sam Rowlands was appointed as Shadow Minister for Local Government, Laura Anne Jones was appointed as Shadow Minister for Education, Russell George as Shadow Minister for Health, Mark Isherwood as Shadow Minister for Social Justice, Janet Finch-Saunders as Shadow Minister for Climate Change, Altaf Hussain as Shadow Minister for Equalities and as deputy whip, Tom Giffard as Shadow Minister for Culture, Tourism and Sport, James Evans as Shadow Minister for Mental Health, Wellbeing, and mid-Wales, Samuel Kurtz as Shadow Minister for Rural Affairs and the Welsh Language, Joel James as Shadow Minister for Social Partnership and Gareth Davies as Shadow Minister for Social Services.

=== 2024 Reshuffle ===
On 18 April 2024, RT Davies announced a reshuffle to his Shadow Cabinet. Laura Anne Jones was appointed Shadow Minister for Culture, Sport and Tourism, Tom Giffard was appointed as Shadow Minister for Education and the Welsh Language, Sam Kurtz was appointed as Shadow Minister for Economy and Energy, James Evans was appointed as Shadow Minister for Rural Affairs, Gareth Davies was appointed as Shadow Minister for Mental Health and Early Years, Paul Davies was appointed Shadow Minister for West Wales, Russell George was appointed Shadow Minister for Mid Wales and Deputy Whip, Mark Isherwood was appointed as Shadow Counsel General and Shadow Minister for Housing and Planning, Altaf Hussain was made Shadow Minister for Social Care, Peter Fox had responsibility for Local Government added to his role as Shadow Finance Minister and Sam Rowlands was appointed Shadow Minister for Health. Natasha Asghar, Janet Finch-Saunders, Joel James and Darren Millar all remained in their previous posts.

==== Changes ====
- Laura Anne Jones was asked to "stand back" from the Shadow Cabinet by Andrew RT Davies on 14 June 2024, after screenshots were released appearing to show Jones instructing a member of staff to overclaim on her expenses. She had been under investigation by the Senedd's Standards Commissioner and the South Wales police for her expenses claims since May 2024. She was re-instated by Andrew RT Davies shortly after he resigned on 3 December 2024.
- Russell George stood down from the Shadow Cabinet on 25 June 2024, pending investigation from the Gambling Commission into bets he made on the date of the 2024 United Kingdom general election.

=== Dissolution ===
On 28 November 2024, it was reported by Nation.Cymru that Davies had been asked to step down by members of the Welsh Conservative group. Later that same day it was reported that he would face a confidence vote in the Welsh Conservative group meeting on Tuesday 3 December. He survived the confidence vote, reportedly with the support of 9 out of 16 members, including his own. The vote was not held as a secret ballot, instead as a show of hands, after a motion by Davies and seconded by Laura Anne Jones. Shortly after the vote, Davies resigned as leader of the Welsh Conservatives, stating he viewed his position as untenable, after a number of members of the Conservative Shadow Cabinet privately threatened to resign if he remained in post. He formally left the role on 5 December 2024, after his replacement Darren Millar was elected unanimously within the Welsh Conservative group.

== Members ==
=== March 2021 - April 2024 ===
Portfolio	Name	Constituency	Term
Leader of the Opposition Leader of the Welsh Conservatives	Andrew RT Davies MS	South Wales Central	March 2021 – December 2024
Shadow Minister for Finance	Peter Fox MS	Monmouth	March 2021 – December 2024
Shadow Minister for Health	Russell George MS	Montgomeryshire	March 2021 – April 2024
Shadow Minister for the Economy	Paul Davies MS	Preseli Pembrokeshire	March 2021 – April 2024
Shadow Minister for Climate Change	Janet Finch-Saunders MS	Aberconwy	March 2021 – December 2024
Shadow Minister for Education	Laura Anne Jones MS	South Wales East	March 2021 – April 2024
Shadow Minister for Social Justice	Mark Isherwood MS	North Wales	March 2021 – April 2024
Shadow Minister for the Constitution and North Wales, Chief Whip and Business Manager	Darren Millar MS	Clwyd West	March 2021 – December 2024
Shadow Minister for Equalities; Deputy Whip	Altaf Hussain MS	South Wales West	March 2021 – April 2024
Shadow Minister for Rural Affairs and the Welsh Language	Samuel Kurtz MS	Carmarthen West and South Pembrokeshire	March 2021 – April 2024
Shadow Minister for Local Government	Sam Rowlands MS	North Wales	March 2021 – April 2024
Shadow Minister for Mental Health, Wellbeing and mid Wales	James Evans MS	Brecon and Radnorshire	March 2021 – April 2024
Shadow Minister for Transport	Natasha Asghar MS	South Wales East	March 2021 – December 2024
Shadow Minister for Social Services	Gareth Davies MS	Vale of Clwyd	March 2021 – April 2024
Shadow Minister for Culture, Tourism and Sport	Tom Giffard MS	South Wales West	March 2021 – April 2024
Shadow Minister for Social Partnership	Joel James MS	South Wales Central	March 2021 – December 2024

=== April 2024 - Present ===
Portfolio	Name	Constituency	Term
Leader of the Opposition Leader of the Welsh Conservatives	Andrew RT Davies MS	South Wales Central	March 2021 – December 2024
Shadow Minister for Finance and Local Government	Peter Fox MS	Monmouth	March 2021 – December 2024
Shadow Minister for Mid Wales and Deputy Whip	Russell George MS	Montgomeryshire	April 2024 - June 2024
Shadow Minister for West Wales	Paul Davies MS	Preseli Pembrokeshire	April 2024 - December 2024
Shadow Minister for Climate Change	Janet Finch-Saunders MS	Aberconwy	May 2021 – December 2024
Shadow Minister for Culture, Sport and Tourism	Laura Anne Jones MS	South Wales East	April 2024 - June 2024 3 December 2024 - 5 December 2024
Shadow Counsel General Shadow Minister for Housing and Planning	Mark Isherwood MS	North Wales	April 2024 - December 2024
Shadow Minister for the Constitution and North Wales Chief Whip Business Manager	Darren Millar MS	Clwyd West	May 2021 - December 2024
Shadow Minister for Social Care	Altaf Hussain MS	South Wales West	April 2024 - December 2024
Shadow Minister for Economy and Energy	Samuel Kurtz MS	Carmarthen West and South Pembrokeshire	April 2024 - December 2024
Shadow Minister for Health	Sam Rowlands MS	North Wales	April 2024 - December 2024
Shadow Minister for Rural Affairs	James Evans MS	Brecon and Radnorshire	April 2024 - December 2024
Shadow Minister for Transport	Natasha Asghar MS	South Wales East	May 2021 - December 2024
Shadow Minister for Mental Health and Early Years	Gareth Davies MS	Vale of Clwyd	April 2024 - December 2024
Shadow Minister for Education and Welsh Language	Tom Giffard MS	South Wales West	April 2024 - December 2024
Shadow Minister for Social Partnership	Joel James MS	South Wales Central	May 2021 - December 2024

==== Changes ====
- Laura Anne Jones was asked to "stand back" from the Shadow Cabinet by Andrew RT Davies on 14 June 2024, after screenshots were released appearing to show Jones instructing a member of staff to overclaim on her expenses. She was intermittently under investigation by the South Wales police for her expenses claims since May 2024. She was re-admitted the day after being cleared by the South Wales Police, though she continues to be under investigation by the Senedd Standards Commissioner.
- Russell George stood down from the Shadow Cabinet on 25 June 2024, pending investigation from the Gambling Commission into bets he made on the date of the 2024 United Kingdom general election.

== See also ==
- Drakeford government
- Members of the 6th Senedd
