= Results of the 2021 Senedd election =

This is a list of the results of the 2021 Senedd election.

== National results ==
Party	Constituency					Regional					Total seats	±
Party	Votes	%	±%	Seats	±	Votes	%	±%	Seats	±	Total seats	±
Labour	443,047	39.9	▲5.2	27	0	401,770	36.2	▲4.7	3	▲1	30	▲1
Conservative	289,802	26.1	▲5.0	8	▲2	278,560	25.1	▲6.3	8	▲3	16	▲5
Plaid Cymru	225,376	20.3	▲0.2	5	▼1	230,161	20.7	▼0.1	8	▲2	13	▲1
Liberal Democrats	54,202	4.9	▼2.8	0	▼1	48,217	4.3	▼2.2	1	▲1	1	0
Green	17,817	1.6	▼0.7	0	0	48,714	4.4	▲1.4	0	0	0	0
Abolish	18,149	1.6	N/A	0	0	41,399	3.7	▼0.7	0	0	0	0
UKIP	8,586	0.8	▼11.7	0	0	17,341	1.6	▼11.4	0	0	0	▼7
Reform UK	17,405	1.6	New	0	New	11,730	1.1	New	0	New	0	New
Propel	8,864	0.8	New	0	New	9,825	0.9	New	0	New	0	New
Gwlad	2,829	0.3	New	0	New	6,776	0.6	New	0	New	0	New
Freedom Alliance	3,148	0.3	New	0	New	3,638	0.3	New	0	New	0	New
Communist						2,837	0.3	▲0.3	0	0	0	0
No More Lockdowns	223	0.0	New	0	New	2,794	0.3	New	0	New	0	New
TUSC						1,647	0.1	▲0.1	0	0	0	0
Christian						1,366	0.1	▲0.1	0	0	0	0
Workers						411	0.0	New	0	New	0	New
Llais Gwynedd	1,136	0.1	▲0.1	0	0						0	0
Socialist	82	0.0	0	0	0						0	0
Independents	21,064	1.9	▲0.8	0	0	3,709	0.3	▲0.1	0	0	0	0
Total	1,111,730	100.00		40		1,110,895	100.00		20		60	

== Results by region ==
=== Summary ===
Vote share by region
Region	Turnout	Regional vote share (%)									Constituency vote share (%)								
Region	Turnout	Lab	Con	PC	LD	AWA	Grn	Ref	UKIP	Other	Lab	Con	PC	LD	AWA	Grn	Ref	UKIP	Other
Mid and West Wales	52.8%	25.9	26.8	27.5	6.8	3.4	4.4	1.1	1.6	2.5	24.8	29.4	29.9	8.8	3.4	1.2	1.1	0.7	0.7
North Wales	46.4%	32.3	29.9	23.9	3.2	3.5	2.9	1.0	1.6	1.7	35.0	31.8	25.3	3.5	Did not contest			1.4	3.0
South Wales Central	48.1%	40.1	22.1	18.2	4.6	3.3	5.7	0.9	1.2	3.9	47.8	21.8	15.1	4.5	2.4	3.3	0.9	0.2	3.9
South Wales East	41.7%	41.4	25.2	14.7	3.4	4.8	4.8	2.0	1.3	2.4	45.5	25.7	13.5	3.6	2.7	1.6	1.0	1.7	4.3
South Wales West	43.7%	42.9	20.9	18.5	3.3	3.8	3.9	1.0	1.5	4.2	47.8	21.0	16.5	3.4	1.9	1.8	0.5	1.5	5.6
Total	46.6%	36.2	25.1	20.7	4.3	3.7	4.4	1.6	1.1	2.9	39.9	26.1	20.3	4.9	1.6	1.6	1.6	0.8	3.2

Seats by region
Region	Constituency seats				Regional seats				Total seats			
Region	Lab	Con	PC	LD	Lab	Con	PC	LD	Lab	Con	PC	LD
Mid and West Wales	1	4	3	0	2	0	1	1	3	4	4	1
North Wales	4	3	2	0	1	2	1	0	5	5	3	0
South Wales Central	8	0	0	0	0	2	2	0	8	2	2	0
South Wales East	7	1	0	0	0	2	2	0	7	3	2	0
South Wales West	7	0	0	0	0	2	2	0	7	2	2	0
Total	27	8	5	0	3	8	8	1	30	16	13	1

=== Mid and West Wales ===
Results
Party	Constituency					Regional					Total seats	±
Party	Votes	%	±%	Seats	±	Votes	%	±%	Seats	±	Total seats	±
Plaid Cymru	71,262	29.9	+3.0	3	–	65,450	27.5	+1.2	1	–	4	–
Conservative	70,182	29.4	+6.3	4	+1	63,827	26.8	+6.2	0	–	4	+1
Labour	59,180	24.8	+7.2	1	–	61,733	25.9	+6.5	2	–	3	–
Liberal Democrats	21,028	8.8	-7.8	0	-1	16,181	6.8	-4.1	1	+1	1	–
Green	2,912	1.2	-1.9	0	–	10,545	4.4	+0.6	0	–	0	–
UKIP	1,704	0.7	-10.1	0	–	3,731	1.6	-10.0	0	-1	0	-1
Other parties	12,045	5.1	+3.2	0	–	16,681	7.0	-0.3	0	–	0	–
Total	238,313	100		8		238,148	100		4		12	

Elected regional members
Seat	Party	MS
1	Plaid Cymru	Cefin Campbell
2	Labour	Eluned Morgan
3	Labour	Joyce Watson
4	Liberal Democrats	Jane Dodds

=== North Wales ===
Results
Party	Constituency					Regional					Total seats	±
Party	Votes	%	±%	Seats	±	Votes	%	±%	Seats	±	Total seats	±
Labour	79,327	35.0	+2.5	4	-1	73,120	32.3	+4.2	1	+1	5	–
Conservative	71,957	31.8	+5.7	3	+1	67,544	29.9	+7.6	2	+1	5	+2
Plaid Cymru	57,235	25.3	+0.8	2	–	53,950	23.9	+0.5	1	–	3	–
Liberal Democrats	8,027	3.5	-1.0	0	–	7,160	3.2	-1.4	0	–	0	–
Green	Did not contest					6,586	2.9	+0.6	0	–	0	–
UKIP	3,180	1.4	-9.3	0	–	3,573	1.6	-10.9	0	-2	0	-2
Other parties	6,812	3.0	+2.9	0	–	14,266	6.3	-0.6	0	–	0	–
Total	226,538	100		9		226,199	100		4		13	

Elected members
Seat	Party	MS
1	Labour	Carolyn Thomas
2	Conservative	Mark Isherwood
3	Conservative	Sam Rowlands
4	Plaid Cymru	Llyr Gruffydd

=== South Wales Central ===
Results
Party	Constituency					Regional					Total seats	±
Party	Votes	%	±%	Seats	±	Votes	%	±%	Seats	±	Total seats	±
Labour	122,703	47.8	+7.1	8	+1	102,611	40.1	+6.2	0	–	8	+1
Conservative	55,884	21.8	+1.6	0	–	56,662	22.1	+3.8	2	–	2	–
Plaid Cymru	38,778	15.1	-3.5	0	-1	46,478	18.2	-2.7	2	+1	2	–
Green	8,356	3.3	+0.5	0	–	14,478	5.7	+2.3	0	–	0	–
Liberal Democrats	11,643	4.5	-2.9	0	–	11,821	4.6	-1.8	0	–	0	–
Abolish the Welsh Assembly	6,101	2.4	+2.4	0	–	8,396	3.3	-0.7	0	–	0	–
UKIP	576	0.2	-9.6	0	–	3,127	1.2	-9.2	0	-1	0	–
Reform UK	2,406	0.9	+0.9	0	–	2,244	0.9	+0.9	0	–	0	–
Other parties	10,074	3.9		0	–	10,020	3.9		0	–	0	–
Total	256,521	100		8		255,837	100		4		12	

Elected members
Seat	Party	MS
1	Conservative	Andrew RT Davies
2	Plaid Cymru	Rhys ab Owen
3	Conservative	Joel James
4	Plaid Cymru	Heledd Fychan

=== South Wales East ===
Results
Party	Constituency					Regional					Total seats	±
Party	Votes	%	±%	Seats	±	Votes	%	±%	Seats	±	Total seats	±
Labour	94,703	45.5	+5.7	7	–	85,988	40.1	+3.1	0	–	7	–
Conservative	53,434	25.7	+7.1	1	–	52,323	25.2	+8.0	2	+1	3	+1
Plaid Cymru	27,996	13.5	-2.8	0	–	30,530	14.7	-0.6	2	+1	2	+1
Abolish the Welsh Assembly	5,541	2.7	+2.7	0	–	9,995	4.8	+0.7	0	–	0	–
Liberal Democrats	7,544	3.6	+0.1	0	–	7,045	3.4	-0.1	0	–	0	–
Green	3,314	1.6	-0.8	0	–	9,950	4.8	+2.3	0	–	0	–
Reform UK	3,452	1.7	+1.7	0	–	2,756	1.3	+1.3	0	–	0	–
UKIP	2,152	1.0	-17.0	0	–	4,101	2.0	-15.8	0	-2	0	-2
Total	207,949	100		8			100		4		12	

Elected members
Seat	Party	MS
1	Plaid Cymru	Delyth Jewell
2	Conservative	Laura Anne Jones
3	Conservative	Natasha Asghar
4	Plaid Cymru	Peredur Owen Griffiths

=== South Wales West ===
Results
Party	Constituency					Regional					Total seats	±
Party	Votes	%	±%	Seats	±	Votes	%	±%	Seats	±	Total seats	±
Labour	87,134	47.8	+2.4	7	–	78,318	42.9	+3.4	0	–	7	–
Conservative	38,345	21.0	+4.2	0	–	38,244	20.9	+5.9	2	+1	2	+1
Plaid Cymru	30,105	16.5	+1.4	0	–	33,753	18.5	+1.3	2	–	2	–
Liberal Democrats	6,140	3.4	-1.6	0	–	6,010	3.3	-3.2	0	–	0	–
Abolish the Welsh Assembly	3,407	1.9	+1.9	0	–	6,975	3.8	-0.4	0	–	0	—
Green	3,235	1.8	-0.7	0	–	7,155	3.9	+1.3	0	–	0	–
Reform UK	2,767	1.5	+1.5	0	–	1,774	1.0	+1.0	0	–	0	–
UKIP	974	0.5	-13.4	0	–	2,809	1.5	-12.2	0	-1	0	-1
Total	182,409	100		7		182,696	100		4		11	

Elected members
Seat	Party	MS
1	Conservative	Thomas Giffard
2	Plaid Cymru	Sioned Williams
3	Conservative	Altaf Hussain
4	Plaid Cymru	Luke Fletcher

== Results by constituency ==
Turnout percentages were also published by Wales Online.

Constituency	Region	2016	2021 result				Constituency vote share (%)							Regional vote share (%)						
Constituency	Region	Party		MS	Maj.	Turnout	Lab	Con	PC	LD	Grn	AWA	Oth.	Lab	Con	PC	LD	Grn	AWA	Oth.
Aberavon	South West	Lab	Lab	David Rees	5,745	22,688	47.4	13.3	21.5	4.3	–	2.9	10.6	45.38	14.14	22.45	3.02	2.97	3.55	8.49
Aberconwy	North	Con	Con	Janet Finch-Saunders	3,336	23,543	25.4	41.7	27.5	3.1	–	–	2.3	27.5	33.8	25.3	2.9	3.4	3.2	3.9
Alyn and Deeside	North	Lab	Lab	Jack Sargeant	4,378	25,843	48.8	31.9	7.3	6.1	–	–	5.9	41.2	32.0	8.7	5.1	3.0	4.5	5.5
Arfon	North	PC	PC	Siân Gwenllian	8,652	21,478	23.5	8.3	63.3	3.0	–	–	2.0	24.5	9.0	55.7	2.1	4.0	1.9	2.8
Blaenau Gwent	South East	Lab	Lab	Alun Davies	6,638	20,817	49.1	12.5	17.2	1.6	–	6.6	13.0	48.2	18.6	14.0	2.0	3.2	7.0	7.0
Brecon and Radnorshire	Mid and West	LD	Con	James Evans	3,820	32,115	15.5	39.7	6.5	27.8	4.8	3.8	6.7	14.87	36.61	8.71	21.27	5.7	5.65	2.39
Bridgend	South West	Lab	Lab	Sarah Murphy	4,064	29,461	42.0	28.3	10.5	2.7	–	–	16.5							
Caerphilly	South East	Lab	Lab	Hefin David	5,078	28,914	46.0	17.3	28.4	2.7	–	3.9	1.7							
Cardiff Central	South Central	Lab	Lab	Jenny Rathbone	7,640	28,532	45.9	13.3	12.2	19.1	5.4									
Cardiff North	South Central	Lab	Lab	Julie Morgan	6,593	40,655	47.6	31.4	8.1	4.0	4.8									
Cardiff South and Penarth	South Central	Lab	Lab	Vaughan Gething	10,606	36,386	49.9	20.7	13.6	3.9	4.5									
Cardiff West	South Central	Lab	Lab	Mark Drakeford	11,211	36,531	48.4	17.7	16.1	2.2	3.5									
Carmarthen East and Dinefwr	Mid and West	PC	PC	Adam Price	6,813	33,253	25.4	23.3	45.9	2.9	0.0									
Carmarthen West and South Pembrokeshire	Mid and West	Con	Con	Samuel Kurtz	936	31,655	32.6	35.5	20.9	3.9	0.0									
Ceredigion	Mid and West	PC	PC	Elin Jones	12,145	29,485	10.9	15.6	55.1	10.5	4.4									
Clwyd South	North	Lab	Lab	Ken Skates	2,953	24,245	43.2	31.1	16.9	3.0	0.0									
Clwyd West	North	Con	Con	Darren Millar	3,685	28,363	28.7	41.7	19.8	4.1	0.0									
Cynon Valley	South Central	Lab	Lab	Vikki Howells	7,468	20,511	55.7	13.6	19.3	1.6	0.0									
Delyn	North	Lab	Lab	Hannah Blythyn	3,711	26,303	48.6	34.5	7.9	4.1	0.0									
Dwyfor Meirionnydd	Mid and West	PC	PC	Mabon ap Gwynfor	7,096	23,814	15.5	18.5	48.2	3.8	0.0									
Gower	South West	Lab	Lab	Rebecca Evans	4,795	33,164	47.1	32.7	11.9	2.6	3.3									
Islwyn	South East	Lab	Lab	Rhianon Passmore	5,239	24,481	40.7	15.9	16.1	1.9	0.0									
Llanelli	Mid and West	Lab	Lab	Lee Waters	5,675	30,218	46.1	16.4	27.3	2.0	0.0									
Merthyr Tydfil and Rhymney	South East	Lab	Lab	Dawn Bowden	9,311	21,154	61.5	12.6	17.5	2.0	0.0									
Monmouth	South East	Con	Con	Peter Fox	3,845	35,883	32.0	42.7	5.8	5.3	5.6									
Montgomeryshire	Mid and West	Con	Con	Russell George	7,528	24,987	14.3	48.1	17.9	16.8	0.0									
Neath	South East	Lab	Lab	Jeremy Miles	5,221	27,578	42.3	14.9	23.4	1.4	3.8									
Newport East	South East	Lab	Lab	John Griffiths	3,584	22,988	47.1	31.6	8.0	6.8	0.0									
Newport West	South East	Lab	Lab	Jayne Bryant	3,906	29,112	48.2	35.0	7.0	3.0	4.4									
Ogmore	South West	Lab	Lab	Huw Irranca-Davies	8,165	24,494	52.5	18.7	19.2	1.8	0.0									
Pontypridd	South Central	Lab	Lab	Mick Antoniw	5,328	27,556	41.8	20.5	22.4	2.3	2.4									
Preseli Pembrokeshire	Mid and West	Con	Con	Paul Davies	1,400	31,516	34.6	39.0	19.5	3.0	0.0									
Rhondda	South Central	PC	Lab	Buffy Williams	5,497	23,458	54.7	6.4	31.3	0.9	0.0									
Swansea East	South West	Lab	Lab	Mike Hedges	9,700	21,098	60.1	13.7	15.1	4.9	0.0									
Swansea West	South West	Lab	Lab	Julie James	6,521	24,162	46.4	19.2	16.3	6.9	4.6									
Torfaen	South East	Lab	Lab	Lynne Neagle	5,321	23,935	48.3	26.1	10.7	4.9	0.0									
Vale of Clwyd	North	Lab	Con	Gareth Davies	366	26,053	40.0	41.4	11.4	3.0	0.0									
Vale of Glamorgan	South Central	Lab	Lab	Jane Hutt	3,270	41,413	43.5	35.9	8.6	2.3	2.9									
Wrexham	North	Lab	Lab	Lesley Griffiths	1,352	22,606	37.4	31.4	21.4	3.3	0.0									
Ynys Môn	North	PC	PC	Rhun ap Iorwerth	10,206	27,734	19.1	20.5	55.9	2.0	0.0									
Total						1,118,084														

== New members ==
20 of the members elected to the Senedd in the election were not members of the previous Senedd.

=== Constituency ===
- James Evans, Conservatives, Brecon and Radnorshire
- Sarah Murphy, Labour, Bridgend
- Samuel Kurtz, Conservatives, Carmarthen West and South Pembrokeshire
- Mabon ap Gwynfor, Plaid Cymru, Dwyfor Meirionnydd
- Peter Fox, Conservatives, Monmouth
- Buffy Williams, Labour, Rhondda
- Gareth Davies, Conservatives, Vale of Clwyd

=== Regional ===
- Cefin Campbell, Plaid Cymru, Mid and West Wales
- Jane Dodds, Liberal Democrats, Mid and West Wales
- Carolyn Thomas, Labour, North Wales
- Sam Rowlands, Conservatives, North Wales
- Rhys ab Owen, Plaid Cymru, South Wales Central
- Heledd Fychan, Plaid Cymru, South Wales Central
- Joel James, Conservatives, South Wales Central
- Peredur Owen Griffiths, Plaid Cymru, South Wales East
- Natasha Asghar, Conservatives, South Wales East
- Sioned Williams, Plaid Cymru, South Wales West
- Luke Fletcher, Plaid Cymru, South Wales West
- Tom Giffard, Conservatives, South Wales West
- Altaf Hussain, Conservatives, South Wales West

== Incumbents defeated ==
Defeated MLA	Party	Constituency/region	New MLA	Party	Ref.
Leanne Wood	Plaid Cymru	Rhondda	Buffy Williams	Labour	
Nick Ramsay	Independent (Note: Originally elected for the Conservatives)	Monmouth	Peter Fox	Conservative	
Gareth Bennett	Independent (Note: Originally elected for UKIP)	South Wales Central			
Michelle Brown	Independent	North Wales			
Neil Hamilton	UKIP	Mid and West Wales			
Caroline Jones	Independent	South Wales West			
Helen Mary Jones	Plaid Cymru	Mid and West Wales			
Mandy Jones	Reform	North Wales			
Dai Lloyd	Plaid Cymru	South Wales West			
Neil McEvoy	Propel (Note: Originally elected for Plaid Cymru)	South Wales Central			
Mark Reckless	Abolish	South Wales East			
David Rowlands	Reform	South Wales East			
