= 2024 Welsh Conservatives leadership election =

- 3–5 December 2024
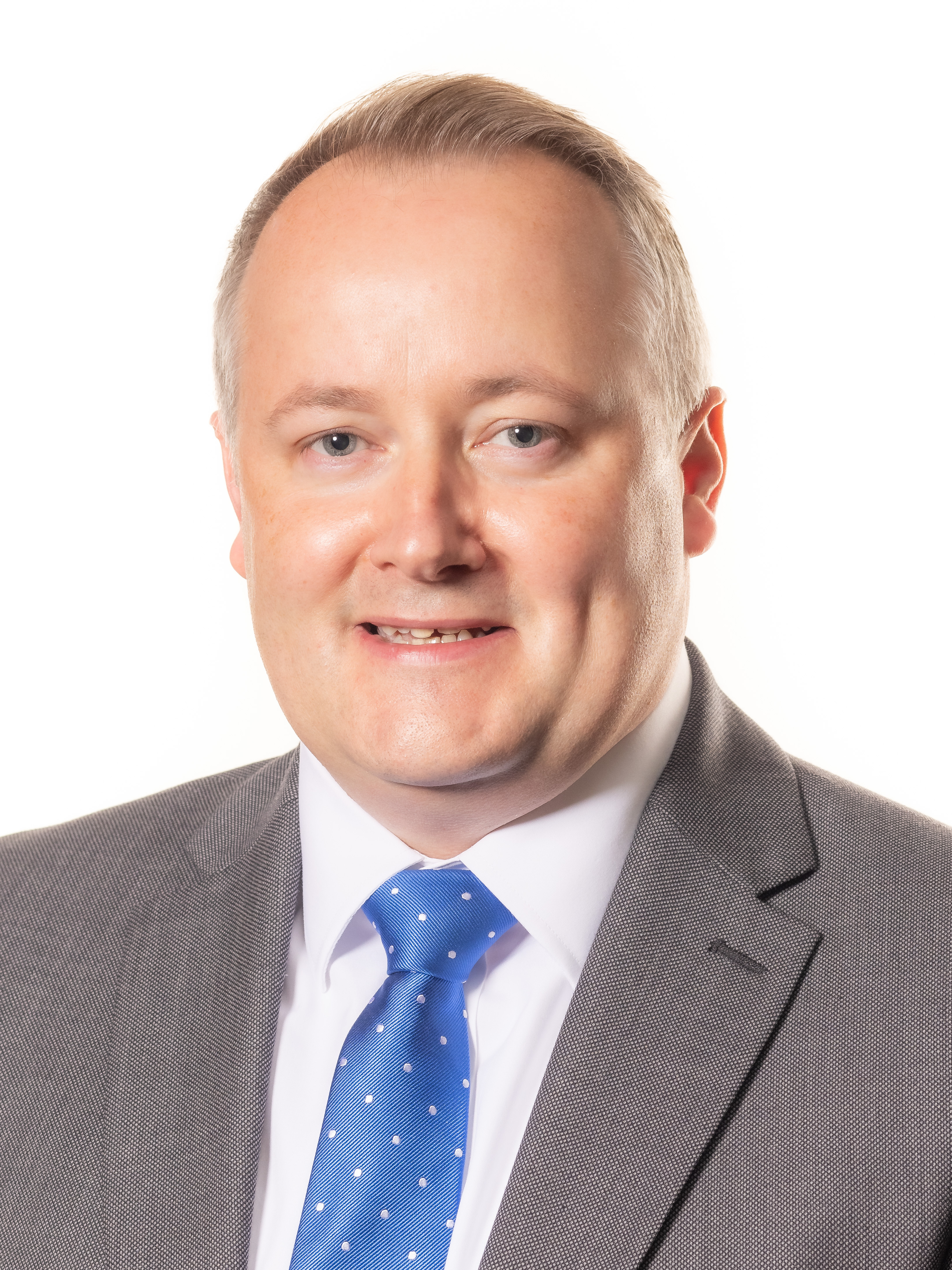
| Candidate | Darren Millar |
| Popular vote | Unopposed |
Leader before election
Andrew RT Davies
Elected Leader
Darren Millar

The 2024 Welsh Conservatives leadership election was triggered by the resignation of Andrew RT Davies on 3 December 2024. Darren Millar was the only candidate who stepped forward for the leadership. As no other candidate was nominated by the deadline for nominations at 17:00 GMT on 5 December, he was elected unopposed as the new leader of the Welsh Conservative Group in the Senedd.

A confidence motion had been held seeking the removal Davies at a meeting of the Conservative Senedd group on 3 December 2024. Although Davies won the motion with 9 votes to 7, he proceeded to resign as leader in the hours following the vote.

Darren Millar was the only candidate to stand in the ensuing leadership election, and was consequently announced as the new Welsh Conservative leader on 5 December.

== Background ==
On 28 November 2024, a group of shadow cabinet ministers approached Davies threatening to resign if he did not vacate his position as Conservative Senedd group leader.

A confidence vote was held at party's weekly group meeting on the following Tuesday, 3 December 2024.

== Confidence vote ==
Despite initial reports that a secret ballot would be held, Nation.Cymru reported that a recorded vote by show of hands was instead conducted.

The confidence motion was narrowly passed, 56.2% to 43.8%.

Supporters
| Confidence (9) | No Confidence (7) |
|---|---|
| Andrew RT Davies | Natasha Asghar |
| Gareth Davies | James Evans |
| Paul Davies | Peter Fox |
| Russell George | Tom Giffard |
| Mark Isherwood | Altaf Hussain |
| Laura Anne Jones | Sam Kurtz |
| Joel James | Sam Rowlands |
| Darren Millar | |
| Janet Finch-Saunders | |

== Aftermath ==
Following the vote, several members of Davies' shadow cabinet threatened to resign their positions.

Thus, despite a narrow majority of the Senedd group backing his continued leadership, Davies published his resignation statement on Twitter shortly before noon on 3 December 2024.

== Election ==
In the subsequent leadership election that followed Davies' resignation, Darren Millar stood as a candidate and was unopposed. Therefore, on 5 December it was announced that Millar would become the new Welsh Conservative leader.
