= Millar shadow cabinet =

Shadow cabinet of Wales (2024–2026)

Darren Millar Shadow Cabinet
- Shadow Cabinet of Wales
- December 2024 – January 2026
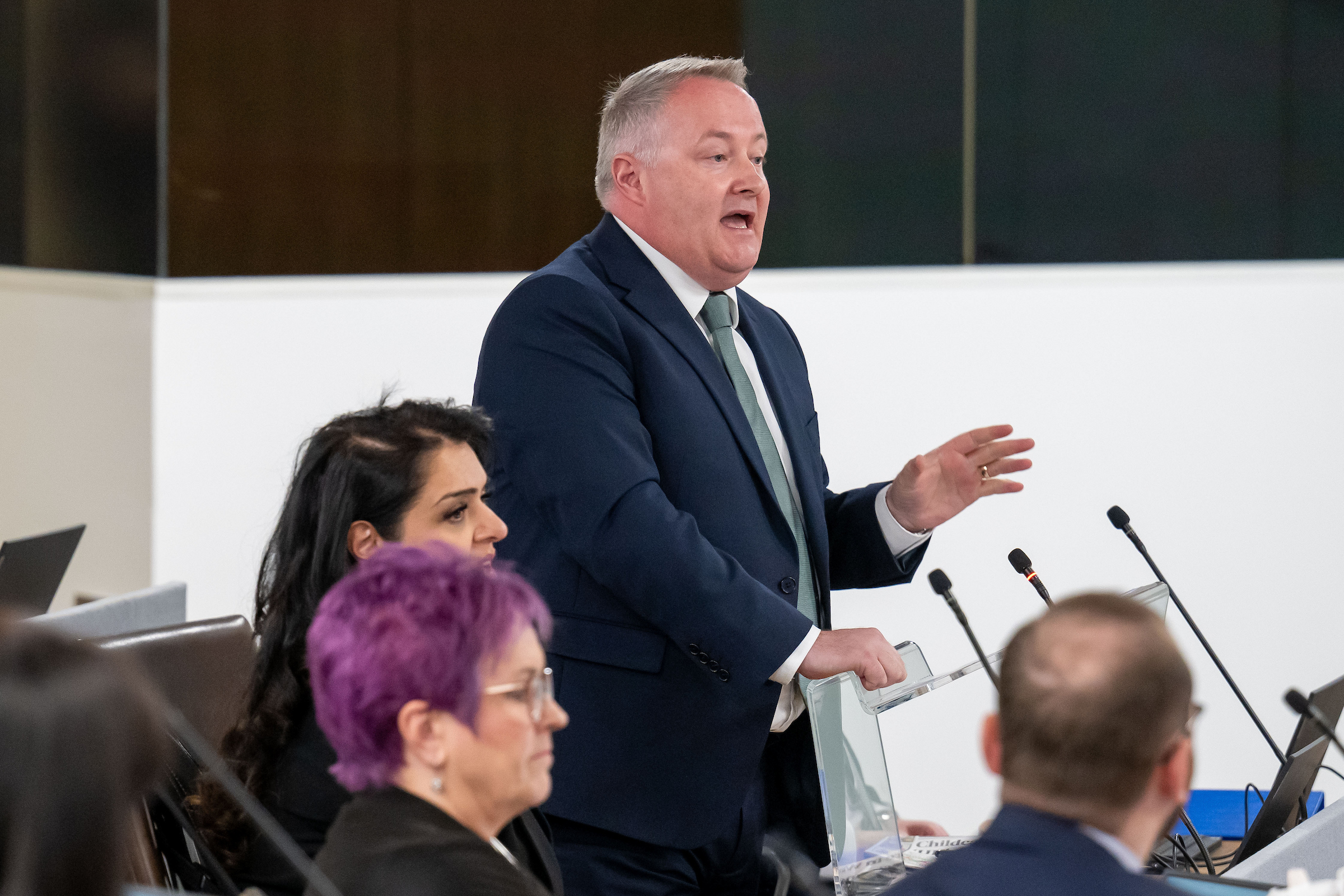
- Millar with members of his cabinet in April 2025
- Date formed: 12 December 2024
- Date dissolved: 20 January 2026

People and organisations
- Monarch: Charles III
- Leader of the Opposition: Darren Millar
- Member party: Welsh Conservatives
- Status in legislature: Official Opposition

History
- Incoming formation: 2024 Welsh Conservatives leadership election
- Outgoing formation: James Evans (Note: Evans was removed by the whip from the Conservative Party. This left the Conservatives tied with Plaid Cymru, thus the Conservatives status as Official Opposition ceased to exist.)
- Legislature term: 6th Senedd
- Predecessor: Fourth Shadow Cabinet of Andrew RT Davies
- Successor: Thomas shadow cabinet

Darren Millar became Leader of the Opposition in Wales on 5 December 2024, after being elected unopposed in the 2024 Welsh Conservative leadership election, following the resignation of Andrew RT Davies. He announced his Shadow Cabinet on 12 December 2024.

== Background ==
On 28 November 2024, it was reported by Nation.Cymru that Andrew RT Davies had been asked to step down by members of the Welsh Conservative group. On Tuesday 3 December 2024, Davies faced a no-confidence vote in the Welsh Conservative group meeting, in which he received 9 votes out of 16 members, including his own. Shortly after the vote, Davies resigned as leader of the Welsh Conservatives, stating he viewed his position as untenable, after a number of members of the Conservative Shadow Cabinet privately threatened to resign if he remained in post.

Following Davies' resignation a leadership election process was triggered. Over the course of 4 and 5 December 2024, Millar received endorsements from all of his Welsh Conservative Senedd colleagues, and was therefore elected unanimously within the Welsh Conservative group.

This represented the formal return of Laura Anne Jones to the Shadow Cabinet, after she had been cleared for the second time by the South Wales Police for breaches of expenses rules.

== Changes ==
On 22 July 2025, Jones left the Welsh Conservatives, and joined Reform UK Wales, leaving the Shadow Cabinet. On 23 July 2025, the Welsh Conservatives announced a reshuffle, with Joel James taking Jones' responsibilities for Local Government and Housing, and James Evans receiving her armed forces responsibilities. The portfolio of Natasha Asghar was expanded to take James' previous responsibilities for Children and Young People.

In January 2026, James Evans had the whip removed from the Conservative Party for allegedly attempting to cross the floor. This tied the seat count of the Welsh Conservatives with Plaid Cymru at 13, meaning the role of official opposition would cease.

== Members ==
=== December 2024 – July 2025 ===
Portfolio	Name	Constituency	Term
Leader of the Opposition Leader of the Welsh Conservatives	Darren Millar MS	Clwyd West	December 2024 – January 2026
Shadow Cabinet Secretary for Constitutional Affairs; Chief Whip	Paul Davies MS	Preseli Pembrokeshire	December 2024 – January 2026
Shadow Cabinet Secretary for Finance	Sam Rowlands MS	North Wales	December 2024 – January 2026
Shadow Cabinet Secretary for Economy, Energy and Welsh Language	Samuel Kurtz MS	Carmarthen West and South Pembrokeshire	December 2024 – January 2026
Shadow Cabinet Secretary for Health and Social Care	James Evans MS	Brecon and Radnorshire	December 2024 – January 2026
Shadow Cabinet Secretary for Education	Natasha Asghar MS	South Wales East	December 2024 – January 2026
Shadow Cabinet Secretary for Transport and Rural Affairs	Peter Fox MS	Monmouth	December 2024 – January 2026
Shadow Cabinet Secretary for Climate Change	Janet Finch-Saunders MS	Aberconwy	March 2021 – January 2026
Shadow Cabinet Secretary for Local Government, Housing and Armed Forces	Laura Anne Jones MS	South Wales East	December 2024 – July 2025
Shadow Cabinet Secretary for Equalities and Social Justice	Altaf Hussain MS	South Wales West	December 2024 – January 2026
Shadow Cabinet Secretary for Culture, Sport and North Wales	Gareth Davies MS	Vale of Clwyd	December 2024 – January 2026
Shadow Cabinet Secretary for Children, Young People, Mental Health and Wellbeing	Joel James MS	South Wales Central	December 2024 – January 2026

=== July 2025 – January 2026 ===
Portfolio	Name	Constituency	Term
Leader of the Opposition Leader of the Welsh Conservatives	Darren Millar MS	Clwyd West	December 2024 – January 2026
Shadow Cabinet Secretary for Constitutional Affairs; Chief Whip	Paul Davies MS	Preseli Pembrokeshire	December 2024 – January 2026
Shadow Cabinet Secretary for Finance	Sam Rowlands MS	North Wales	December 2024 – January 2026
Shadow Cabinet Secretary for Economy, Energy and Welsh Language	Samuel Kurtz MS	Carmarthen West and South Pembrokeshire	December 2024 – January 2026
Shadow Cabinet Secretary for Health and Social Care and the Armed Forces	James Evans MS	Brecon and Radnorshire	December 2024 – January 2026
Shadow Cabinet Secretary for Children, Young People and Education	Natasha Asghar MS	South Wales East	December 2024 – January 2026
Shadow Cabinet Secretary for Transport and Rural Affairs	Peter Fox MS	Monmouth	December 2024 – January 2026
Shadow Cabinet Secretary for Climate Change	Janet Finch-Saunders MS	Aberconwy	March 2021 – January 2026
Shadow Cabinet Secretary for Local Government and Housing	Joel James MS	South Wales Central	July 2025 – January 2026
Shadow Cabinet Secretary for Equalities and Social Justice	Altaf Hussain MS	South Wales West	December 2024 – January 2026
Shadow Cabinet Secretary for Culture, Sport and North Wales	Gareth Davies MS	Vale of Clwyd	December 2024 – January 2026
