= Third Andrew RT Davies shadow cabinet =

Senedd's shadow cabinet in 2021

Andrew RT Davies Shadow Cabinet
- Shadow Cabinet of Wales
- January 2021– May 2021
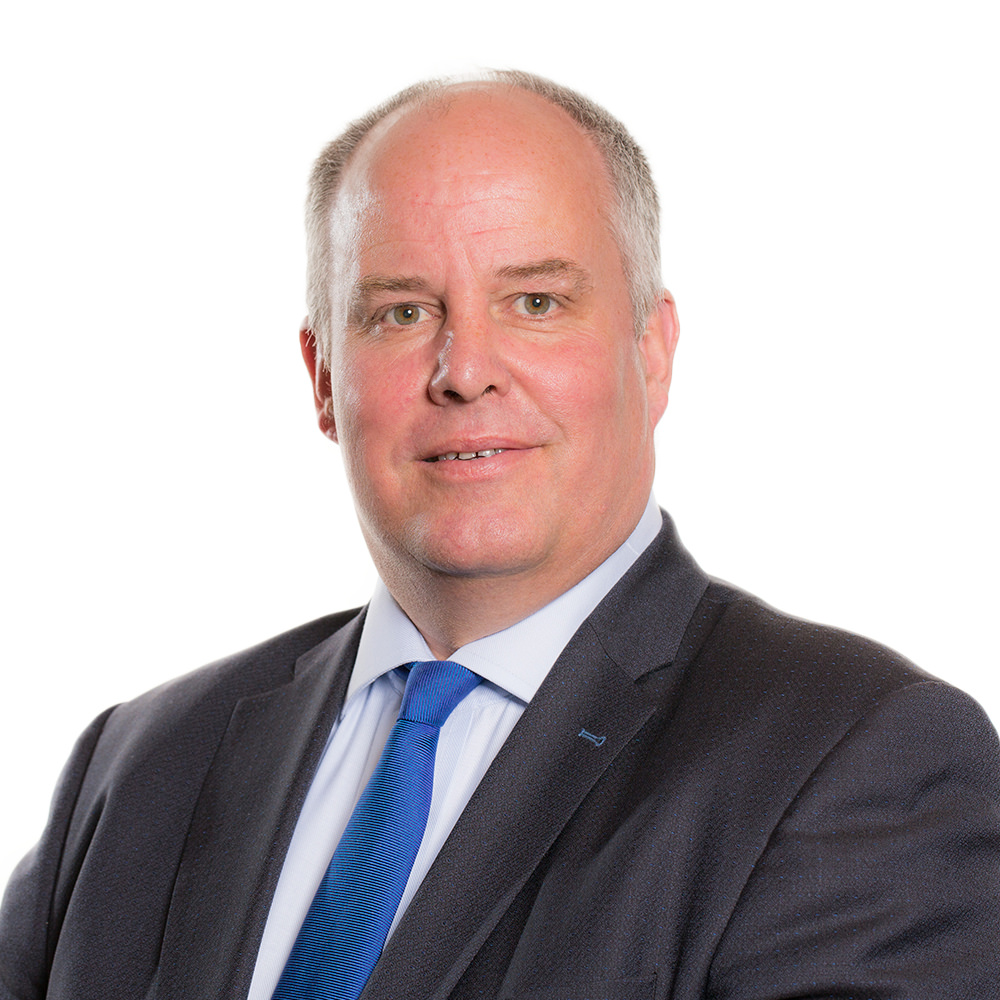
- Date formed: 24 January 2021
- Date dissolved: 29 March 2021

People and organisations
- Monarch: Elizabeth II
- Leader of the Opposition: Andrew RT Davies
- Member party: Welsh Conservatives
- Status in legislature: Official Opposition

History
- Incoming formation: 2021 Welsh Conservatives leadership election
- Outgoing formation: 2021 Senedd election
- Legislature term: 5th Senedd
- Predecessor: Shadow Cabinet of Paul Davies
- Successor: Fourth Shadow Cabinet of Andrew RT Davies

Andrew RT Davies became the Leader of the Opposition in Wales on the 24 January 2021 after the resignation of Paul Davies as leader the following day. On 29 March 2021, Nick Ramsay left the Welsh Conservative group, meaning it was no longer the largest party not in government in the Senedd, and therefore no longer the official opposition.

== Background ==
Paul Davies was seen drinking with other politicians on the Senedd estate on 8 and 9 December 2020 that could have proven contrary to Welsh Government COVID alcohol ban that was brought in four days before. He apologised for his actions on the 19 January 2021 and the Conservative Group in the Senedd gave there unanimous support in a meeting on the 22 January for Paul Davies to stay as leader. The BBC reported that Paul Davies was considering stepping down in that meeting, and a report by the Senedd Commission said that it could be a possible breach of COVID rules. There was much uproar by grassroots supporters and senior members of the Welsh Conservatives of his actions and on 23 January Paul Davies stepped down with immediate effect.

There was a short discussion between Conservative Members of the Senedd the following day where they gave their unanimous support for Andrew R. T. Davies to become leader. He created a cabinet out of members left in the frontbench (Darren Miller, Nick Ramsey and Paul Davies had stepped down) on the same day. David Melding re-joined the cabinet after stepping down in September 2020 following disagreements with the parties Internal Market stance.

On 29 March 2021, Nick Ramsay left the Welsh Conservative group in the Senedd, to run as an independent for his Monmouth seat, having been deselected by his local party. This meant the Conservatives matched Plaid Cymru with 10 MSs, meaning there was no second largest party, and therefore no official opposition. Andrew RT Davies would form the next Shadow Cabinet after the 2021 Senedd Election, his fourth.

== Members ==
Conservative Shadow Cabinet (as of 24 January 2021)
Portfolio	Name	Constituency	Term
Leader of the Opposition Leader of the Welsh Conservatives	Andrew RT Davies MS	South Wales Central	Jan 2021 – March 2021
Shadow Minister for Health and Social Services	Angela Burns MS	Carmarthen West and South Pembrokeshire	Jan 2021 – March 2021
Shadow Minister for Finance, North Wales and Chief Whip	Mark Isherwood MS	North Wales	Jan 2021 – March 2021
Shadow Minister for Economy, Transport and Mid Wales	Russell George MS	Montgomeryshire	Jan 2021 – March 2021
Shadow Minister for Environment, Energy and Rural Affairs	Janet Finch-Saunders MS	Aberconwy	Jan 2021 – March 2021
Shadow Minister for Mental Health, Wellbeing, Culture and Sport	David Melding MS	South Wales Central	Jan 2021 – March 2021
Shadow Minister for Education, Skills and the Welsh Language	Suzy Davies MS	South Wales West	Jan 2021 – March 2021
Shadow Minister for Housing and Local Government, Equalities, Children and Young People	Laura Anne Jones MS	South Wales East	Jan 2021 – March 2021

== See also ==
- Drakeford government
- Members of the 5th Senedd
