= Mohammad Asghar =

British politician (1945–2020)

Mohammad Asghar MS
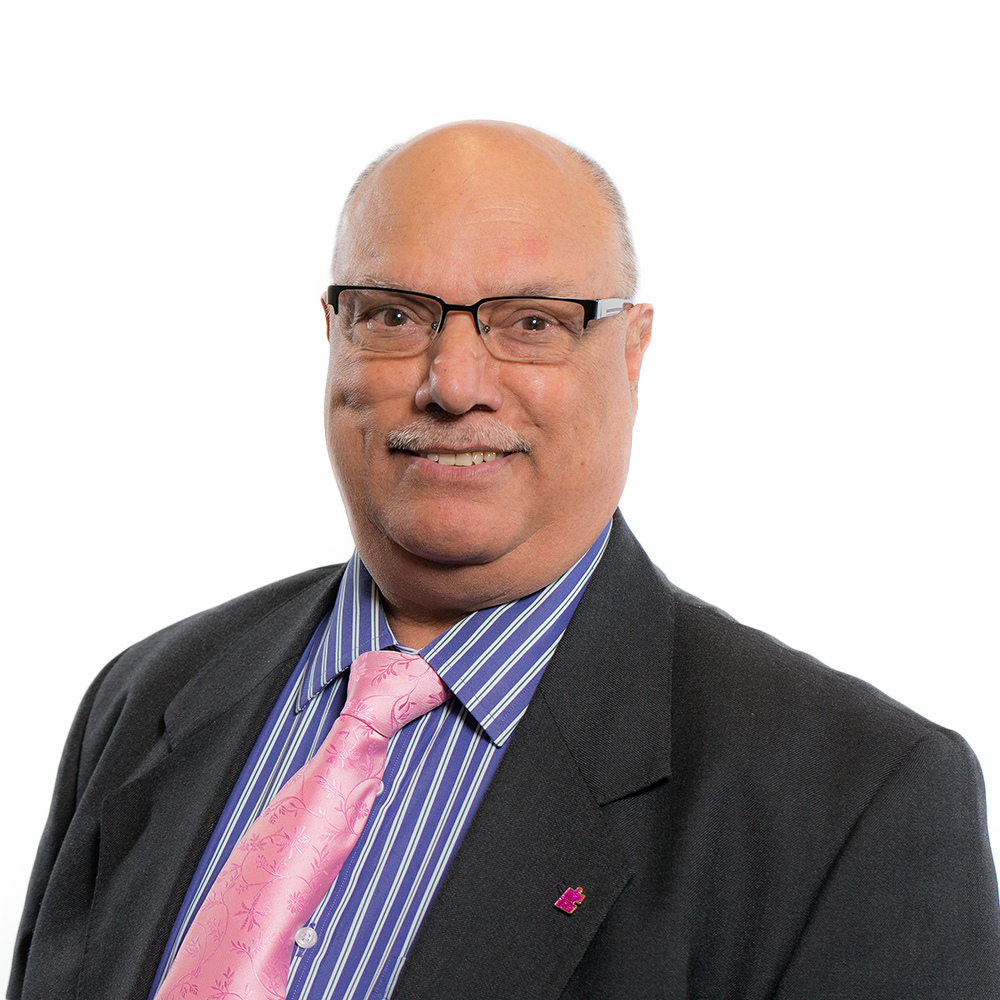
- Official portrait, 2016

Member of the Senedd for South Wales East
- In office 3 May 2007 – 16 June 2020
- Preceded by: Laura Anne Jones
- Succeeded by: Laura Anne Jones

Personal details
- Born: 30 September 1945 Peshawar, North West Frontier Province, British India (now in Khyber-Pakhtunkhwa, Pakistan)
- Died: 16 June 2020 (aged 74) Newport, Wales
- Party: Welsh Conservatives
- Other political affiliations: Plaid Cymru (until 2009); Welsh Labour (mid 1990s)
- Children: Natasha Asghar
- Website: www.mohammadasghar.org.uk

Mohammad Asghar (30 September 1945 – 16 June 2020), known as Oscar, was a Welsh politician who was a Member of the Senedd for South Wales East. He was a member of the Welsh Conservatives, and previously of Welsh Labour, and Plaid Cymru.

He came to prominence after being elected to the Welsh Assembly in 2007 as a member of Plaid Cymru on the list for South Wales East. He was the first ethnic minority and Muslim Member of the Welsh Assembly, as well as the first Assembly Member who was a member of a political party to defect to another party.

== Early life ==
Born in Peshawar (then in British India) to Aslam Khan and Zubaida Aslam, Asghar gained a BA from Peshawar University before moving to Wales to complete a course in accountancy in Newport.

== Political career ==
Asghar initially joined the Conservative Party, remaining a member for some two decades, later joining the Labour Party in the 1990s. He joined Plaid Cymru some time after becoming Wales's first Muslim councillor, representing Victoria ward on Newport City Council. He had stood for Plaid Cymru in general elections. His daughter Natasha Asghar also stood as a Plaid Cymru candidate in the 2007 Elections, and also joined the Conservative party at the same time he did so.

On 8 December 2009, Asghar became the first AM to cross the floor, defecting from Plaid Cymru to the Conservative Party. He claimed that he felt "out of tune" with Plaid policies, described himself as a royalist and unionist, and stated that he felt like "a little parrot in a jungle". Plaid Cymru called on Asghar to resign his seat following his defection.

=== Expenses scandal and corruption ===
Issues were raised regarding two staff members remaining on permanent paid leave until the Welsh assembly was dissolved in 2011. Asghar has gone on record as stating that MEP Jillian Evans's offer to give his daughter work experience was a significant factor in his decision to defect from the Labour party to Plaid Cymru.

=== Controversy over 2011 election candidacy ===
In August 2010, Asghar was selected to stand for the Welsh Conservatives in the 2011 election. In September 2010 David Fouweather, the Chair of the South-East Wales Area Council of the Welsh Conservatives, called for a full investigation into events that preceded the endorsement of Mohammad Asghar as a regional list candidate. In a letter to the Chair of the Welsh Conservatives, Fouweather wrote:

There were numerous telephone calls made to myself by a representative of the party chairman’s office in London. These calls made it quite clear to me that Mohammad Asghar had to be re-adopted at all costs because of the embarrassment that it would create for the party. ... I was told that failure to re-adopt Mr Asghar could lead to my possible suspension from the party whilst an investigation was carried out to see if there were any racial motives for him not being adopted. This I found deeply offensive, resulting in a great deal of pressure being put upon me to deliver the desired outcome for the party hierarchy.

Following his call for an investigation into Asghar's selection, Fouweather was asked by the Conservative Party to stand down as Chair of the South-East Wales Area Council.

=== Newport council election 2011 ===
In December 2011, Asghar emailed fellow Conservatives asking them to support his wife in a vacant Newport City Council seat two days after the incumbent Les Knight had died. The email read:

I am very sad about Coun Les Knight although it seems that things are already moving on in terms of the Allt-yr-yn seat. I would be very grateful if you could consider Firdaus Asghar to stand in the elections from Allt-yr-yn. I am sure you are aware that Firdaus has lived in the ward for more than 20 years and worked closely with Coun Knight on many constituency matters.

One of the Conservative councillors who received the email said:

I was extremely shocked to get this email, which I found in appallingly bad taste. I have known Les and his wife for more than 30 years and am very sad at his death. When I received the email the funeral arrangements hadn't even been made. Sending an email like this was callous and in extremely poor taste. I can’t imagine what was meant by "things are already moving on in terms of the Allt-yr-yn seat".

Asghar later apologised for the email, and confirmed that his wife would not be standing for election in the forthcoming elections.

=== Mosque election dispute ===
In 2011, Asghar was involved in a dispute with members of the Jamia Mosque and Al-Noor Mosque, the two largest Sunni mosques in Newport, during which some members accused him of aggressively opposing the introduction of democratic elections for the mosques' leadership. Asghar was subsequently issued with an ex parte court injunction, forbidding him from attending either mosque. In December 2011, members of the two mosques applied to have the injunction extended. The injunction was instead lifted, when a Cardiff County Court judge instructed the two parties to come to a private agreement.

=== Awards and nominations ===
In January 2014 and 2015, Asghar was nominated for the Politician of the Year award at the British Muslim Awards.

== Personal life ==
He was a qualified pilot and spoke Urdu, Hindi and Punjabi fluently.

Asghar married his wife, Firdaus, in 1983; they had one daughter Natasha Asghar.

He ran with the Olympic torch in 1964 and campaigned for Wales to have its own cricket team.

== Death ==
Asghar died on 16 June 2020 after being rushed to hospital earlier in the day. His funeral took place in Newport Central Mosque on 25 June 2020.

== Offices held ==
Senedd
| Preceded by Laura Anne Jones | Member of the Senedd for South Wales East; 2007–2020 | Succeeded by Laura Anne Jones |
