= Gareth Davies (Welsh politician) =

Welsh politician

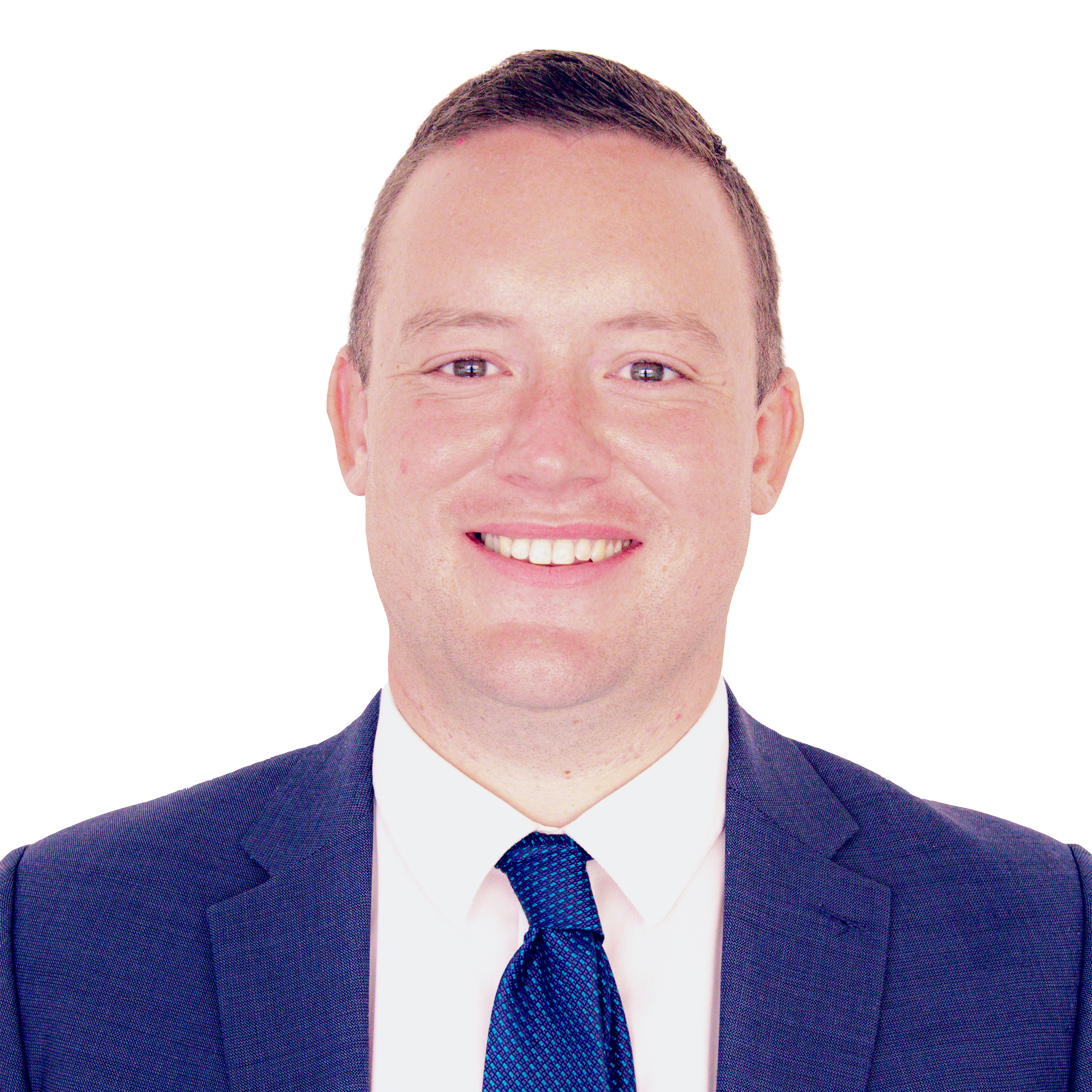
- Official portrait, 2021

Shadow Cabinet Secretary for Culture, Tourism, Sport, and North Wales
- In office 12 December 2024 – 20 January 2026
- Leader: Darren Millar
- Preceded by: Laura Anne Jones
- Succeeded by: Louise Emery (Culture and Tourism); James Evans (Sport)

Shadow Minister for Mental Health and Early Years
- In office 18 April 2024 – 5 December 2024
- Leader: Andrew RT Davies
- Preceded by: James Evans
- Succeeded by: Joel James

Shadow Minister for Social Services
- In office 27 May 2021 – 18 April 2024
- Leader: Andrew RT Davies
- Preceded by: Angela Burns
- Succeeded by: Altaf Hussain

Member of the Senedd for Vale of Clwyd
- In office 7 May 2021 – 8 April 2026
- Preceded by: Ann Jones
- Succeeded by: Constituency abolished

Personal details
- Born: Gareth Lloyd Davies; 17 September 1988 (age 37) St Asaph, Denbighshire, Wales
- Party: Conservative
- Spouse: Catrin Jones
- Children: 1
- Education: Ysgol Bryn Hedydd, Rhyl, Rydal Penrhos 1996–2005; Coleg Llandrillo Cymru; Bangor University
- Occupation: NHS worker (2010–21); Denbighshire County Councillor (2017–22); Member of the Senedd (2021–
- Committees: Welsh Parliament Culture, Communications, Welsh Language, Sport, and International Relations Committee
- Portfolio: Shadow Cabinet Secretary for Culture, Tourism, Sport, and North Wales
- Website: https://www.garethdavies.wales/

Gareth Lloyd Davies (born 17 September 1988) is a Welsh Conservative politician who was Member of the Senedd (MS) for Vale of Clwyd from 2021 to 2026. He was the only Conservative to win this seat since its establishment in 1999.

== Early life and education ==
Born in 1988, Davies is the son of Steven and Susan Davies the couple was married in 1985. He attended Rydal Penrhos Senior School and Coleg Llandrillo Cymru. From 2010 to 2021, Davies worked in learning disability and mental health nursing, and physiotherapy for the NHS in Flintshire, North Wales.

== Political career ==
In 2017, he was elected to Denbighshire County Council, representing the Prestatyn South West ward. He also serves the Prestatyn South West ward on Prestatyn Town Council. He was elected to the Welsh Parliament, known as the Senedd, to represent the Vale of Clwyd constituency on 7 May 2021. He continued to sit as a Denbighshire County Councillor until 2022. In May 2021, he was appointed as the Shadow Minister for Social Services and elected to the Senedd's Health and Social Care Committee. Following a Shadow Cabinet Reshuffle in April 2024, Davies was appointed Shadow Minister for Mental Health and Early years. He maintained this role until Andrew RT Davies stood down as leader of the Welsh Conservatives in December 2024, whereupon his successor Darren Millar appointed him Shadow Cabinet Secretary for Culture, Tourism, Sport, and North Wales. He also now sits on the Senedd's Culture, Communications, Welsh Language, Sport, and International Relations Committee.

On 30 June 2021, Davies delivered the first Members Legislative proposal of the 6th Senedd. He proposed new legislation which would ensure a rights-based approach to services for older people in Wales. His proposal won the backing of Senedd Members, despite opposition from Welsh Government.

In October 2021, there was a vote in the Senedd for the introduction of vaccine passports in Wales. Davies missed the chance to vote in-person as he was at the Conservative Party Conference in Manchester, and so attempted to cast his vote against the measure via Zoom. He was unable to do so, and the motion passed by a single vote, 28 votes to 27.

In March 2023 Davies caused controversy after stating in the Senedd that there are "too many" Gypsy and Traveller sites in North Wales and adding that, "The simple message is that we don't want them". He was asked to "rethink" his comments by Social Justice Minister Jane Hutt. His remarks were also condemned by gypsy and traveller advocates. Davies subsequently apologised for his remarks.

He has openly discussed serving as a politician with bipolar disorder, having been diagnosed a year prior his election to the Senedd in 2021. He is also an ambassador for the charity Bipolar UK and an advocate for ending the stigma surrounding mental illness.

In the 2026 Senedd election, he was second candidate on the Conservative party list in the Clwyd constituency, but was not elected.

== Personal life ==
In 2018, Davies married Catrin Jones; the couple have a son. Outside of politics, he enjoys football, rugby, cricket, running and mountaineering.

== Offices held ==
Town and County Councillor for South West Prestatyn (2017–2022)

Senedd
| Preceded by Ann Jones | Member of the Senedd for Vale of Clwyd; 2021 – present | Incumbent |
