= Joel James (politician) =

Welsh politician

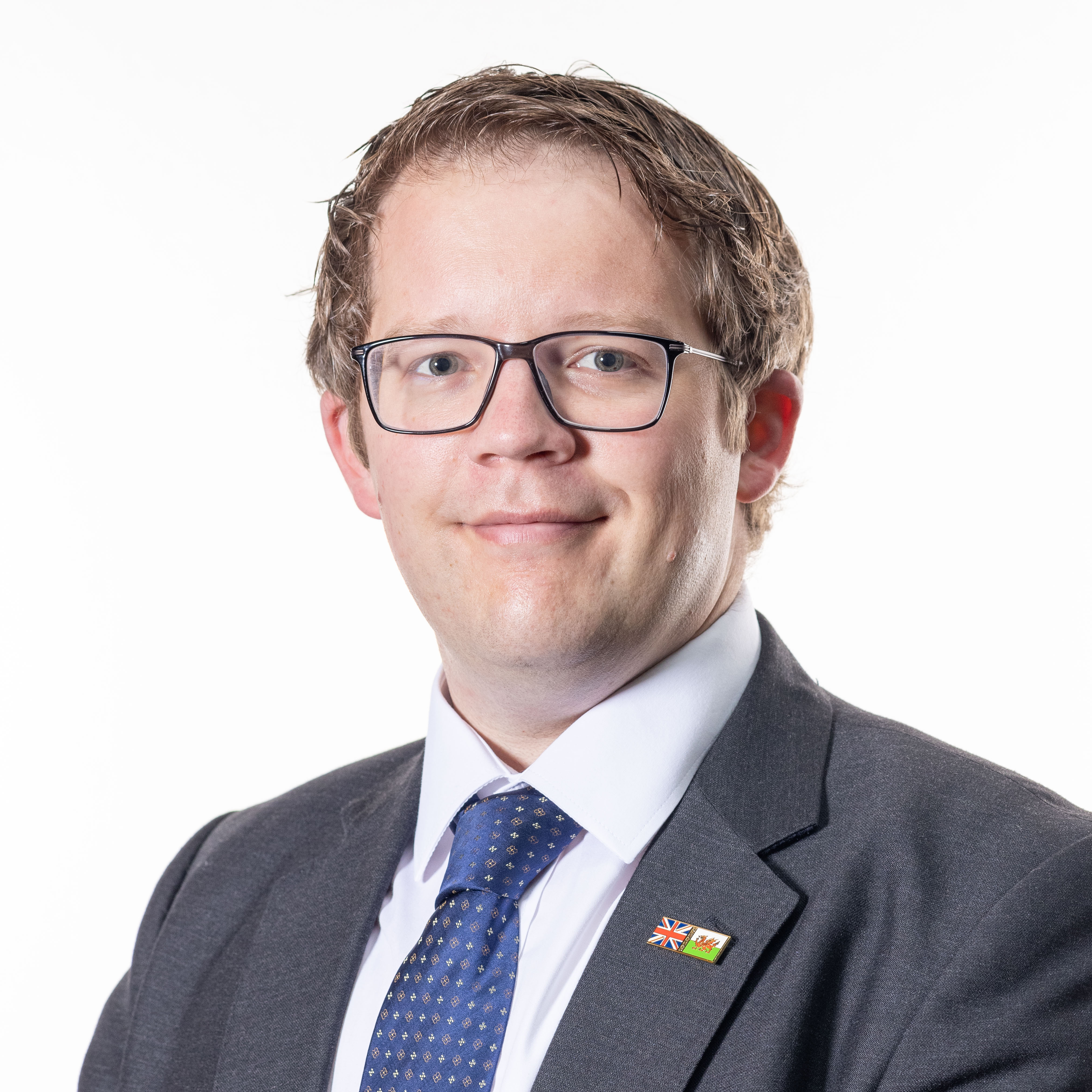
- James in 2021

Shadow Cabinet Secretary for Local Government and Housing
- In office 23 July 2025 – 20 January 2026
- Leader: Darren Millar
- Preceded by: Laura Anne Jones
- Succeeded by: Francesca O'Brien (May 2026)

Shadow Cabinet Secretary for Children, Young People, Mental Health and Wellbeing
- In office 12 December 2024 – 23 July 2025
- Leader: Darren Millar
- Preceded by: Gareth Davies
- Succeeded by: Natasha Asghar

Shadow Minister for Social Partnership
- In office 27 May 2021 – 12 December 2024
- Leader: Andrew RT Davies
- Preceded by: Role Established
- Succeeded by: Role re-organised

Member of the Senedd for South Wales Central
- In office 8 May 2021 – 7 April 2026
- Preceded by: Multi-member constituency
- Succeeded by: Constituency abolished

Member of Rhondda Cynon Taf County Borough Council for Llantwit Fardre
- Incumbent
- Assumed office 3 September 2026
- Preceded by: Sam Trask (Conservative)
- In office 1 May 2008 – 5 May 2022
- Preceded by: B.P. Channon (Plaid Cymru)
- Succeeded by: Karl Johnson (Conservative)

Personal details
- Born: 9 March 1985 (age 41) Church Village, Wales
- Party: Conservative
- Education: University of Bristol and Cardiff University
- Website: https://www.joeljames.wales/

Joel Stephen James (born 9 March 1985) is a Welsh Conservative politician who served as a Member of the Senedd (MS) for the region of South Wales Central from 2021 to 2026.

== Background ==
James was born at East Glamorgan General Hospital in Church Village and attended Bryn Celynnog Comprehensive School in Beddau.

Following his time at Bryn Celynnog, James studied history at the University of Bristol and completed a postgraduate degree in Welsh History at Cardiff University.

Prior to being elected as a Member of the Senedd in 2021, James worked as a librarian at Cardiff Sixth Form College - one of the highest rated schools in the UK.

== Political career ==
James became the first ever Conservative elected to Rhondda Cynon Taf Country Borough Council in 2008.

Prior to his election to the Senedd, James stood for election for the Pontypridd constituency in 2011, 2016 and 2021, a seat long held by Welsh Labour. In 2021 he was also placed second on the South Wales Central regional list, behind leader Andrew RT Davies. They were both elected. Later that month, he was appointed to the Welsh Conservative Shadow Cabinet as Shadow Minister for Social Partnership a portfolio that covers many issues such as; public services (including community fire safety), the Wales and Africa programme, Coal tip policy and the promotion of sustainable development. In December 2024, he was moved to a shadow portfolio covering children, young people, mental health and wellbeing by new Welsh Conservative leader Darren Millar. After the defection of Laura Anne Jones in July 2025, he was moved to the role of Shadow Cabinet Secretary for Local Government and Housing, replacing Jones.

James still represents the ward of Efail Isaf on Llantwit Fardre Community Council, but left Rhondda Cynon Taf Council, after not contesting the 2022 local elections.

As Member of the Senedd, James also sits on the Equality and Social Justice committee. He previously sat on the petitions committee and the Local Government and Housing Committee. He is also involved in a number of different Cross-Party Groups, and is the chair of the Liver Disease and Liver Cancer Cross-Party Group in the Senedd.

James contested Caerdydd Ffynnon Taf in the 2026 Senedd election but was not elected.

== Political views ==
=== Devolution ===
James supports the abolition of the Senedd. During his campaign for Senedd in 2021, a document written by James intended for Welsh Conservative members voting in his selection race was leaked to the BBC, which demonstrated these views. James responded to the BBC reporting by saying "As Welsh Conservatives, is it not our duty to say that after 20 years of devolution, it has failed, and that enough is enough?"

In 2024 he was criticised by fellow Conservative MS on Twitter, after supporting party leader Andrew RT Davies on an informal poll on abolishing the Senedd held at the Vale of Glamorgan Show.

=== Assisted suicide ===
James voted against a Senedd motion supporting the principle of medically assisted suicide.
