= Vale of Clwyd (Senedd constituency) =

Senedd constituency (1999–2026)

Coordinates: 53°14′08″N 3°24′21″W

Vale of Clwyd Dyffryn Clwyd
- Former Senedd county constituency for the Senedd

- The Vale of Clwyd shown within the North Wales electoral region and the region shown within Wales

Former Senedd county constituency
- Created: 1999
- Abolished: 2026
- Party: Conservative
- MS: Gareth Davies
- Preserved county: Clwyd

The Vale of Clwyd (Welsh: Dyffryn Clwyd) was a constituency of the Senedd. It elected one Member of the Senedd by the first past the post method of election. Also, however, it was one of nine constituencies in the North Wales electoral region, which elected four additional members, in addition to nine constituency members, to produce a degree of proportional representation for the region as a whole.

== Boundaries ==
Map of 2007–2026 boundaries

The constituency was created for the first election to the Assembly, in 1999, with the name and boundaries of the Vale of Clwyd Westminster constituency. It was entirely within the preserved county of Clwyd. From the 2007 Assembly election, the constituency had included an area within the Clwyd West constituency. For Westminster purposes, the same boundary change became effective for the 2010 United Kingdom general election.

When created in 1999, the North Wales region included the constituencies of Alyn and Deeside, Caernarfon, Clwyd South, Clwyd West, Delyn, Vale of Clwyd, Wrexham and Ynys Môn.

Since the 2007 Assembly election, the region included Aberconwy, Alyn and Deeside, Arfon, Clwyd South, Conwy, Delyn, Vale of Clwyd, Wrexham and Ynys Môn.

== Voting ==
In elections for the Senedd, each voter had two votes. The first vote was used to vote for a candidate to become the Member of the Senedd for the voter's constituency, elected by the first past the post system. The second vote was used to vote for a regional closed party list of candidates. Additional member seats were allocated from the lists by the d'Hondt method, with constituency results being taken into account in the allocation.

== Members of the Senedd ==
Election	Member	Party	Portrait
1999–2021	Ann Jones	Labour	
2021–present	Gareth Davies	Conservative	

== Elections ==
=== Elections in the 2020s ===
2021 Senedd election: Vale of Clwyd
Party	Candidate	Constituency			Regional		
Party	Candidate	Votes	%	±%	Votes	%	±%
Conservative	Gareth Davies	10,792	41.4	+5.0	9,747	38.1	+8.9
Labour	Jason McLellan	10,426	40.0	+0.5	9,777	38.2	+5.0
Plaid Cymru	Glenn Swingler	2,972	11.4	+2.7	3,417	13.3	+0.2
Liberal Democrats	Lisa Davies	782	3.0	-0.1	620	2.4	+0.1
Reform	Peter Dain	552	2.1	New	340	1.3	New
Independent	David Thomas	529	2.0	New			
Abolish					794	3.1	-0.8
Green					608	2.4	+0.7
Freedom Alliance (UK)					131	0.5	New
Independent	Michelle Brown				65	0.3	New
Communist					60	0.2	±0.0
Propel					36	0.1	New
TUSC					16	0.1	New
Majority		366	1.4	N/A			
Turnout		26,053					
Conservative gain from Labour		Swing					

=== Elections in the 2010s ===
Welsh Assembly Election 2016: Vale of Clwyd
Party	Candidate	Constituency			Regional		
Party	Candidate	Votes	%	±%	Votes	%	±%
Labour	Ann Jones	9,560	39.5	−11.2	7,986	33.2	-6.7
Conservative	Sam Rowlands	8,792	36.4	+3.1	7,024	29.2	-0.6
UKIP	Paul Davies-Cooke	2,975	12.3	New	2,991	12.5	+7.3
Plaid Cymru	Mair Rowlands	2,098	8.7	−2.6	3,157	13.1	±0.0
Liberal Democrats	Gwyn Williams	758	3.1	−1.6	562	2.3	-1.4
Abolish					939	3.9	New
Association of Welsh Independents					400	1.7	New
Green					397	1.7	+0.1
Mark Young - Independent					382	1.6	New
Monster Raving Loony					132	0.5	New
Communist					52	0.2	±0.0
Majority		768	3.1	−14.3			
Turnout		24,183	42.9	+1.9			
Labour hold		Swing	-7.1				

Welsh Assembly Election 2011: Vale of Clwyd
Party	Candidate	Constituency			Regional		
Party	Candidate	Votes	%	±%	Votes	%	±%
Labour	Ann Jones	11,691	50.7	+14.3	9,148	39.9	+10.4
Conservative	Ian Gunning	7,680	33.3	−2.7	6,847	29.8	-3.0
Plaid Cymru	Alun Jones	2,597	11.3	−6.1	3,015	13.1	-4.5
Liberal Democrats	Heather Prydderch	1,088	4.7	−5.5	854	3.7	-3.9
UKIP					1,203	5.2	+2.1
Socialist Labour					648	2.8	+1.9
BNP					530	2.3	-2.5
Green					378	1.6	-0.7
Welsh Christian					183	0.8	+0.1
Weyman - Independent					99	0.4	New
Communist					45	0.2	-0.1
Majority		4,011	17.4	+17.0			
Turnout		23,056	41.0	+0.7			
Labour hold		Swing	+8.5				

Regional ballots rejected: 186

=== Elections in the 2000s ===
Welsh Assembly Election 2007: Vale of Clwyd
Party	Candidate	Constituency			Regional		
Party	Candidate	Votes	%	±%	Votes	%	±%
Labour	Ann Jones	8,104	36.4	−9.8	6,539	29.5	-10.5
Conservative	Matthew G. Wright	8,012	36.0	+5.3	7,269	32.8	+4.3
Plaid Cymru	Mark Jones	3,884	17.4	+3.3	3,892	17.6	+2.7
Liberal Democrats	Mark Young	2,275	10.2	+1.1	1,682	7.6	-1.7
BNP					1,061	4.8	New
UKIP					676	3.1	+1.1
Green					508	2.3	±0.0
Socialist Labour					204	0.9	New
Welsh Christian					164	0.7	New
CPA					89	0.4	New
Communist					68	0.3	New
Majority		92	0.4	−15.1			
Turnout		22,275	40.3	+3.8			
Labour hold		Swing	−7.5				

Welsh Assembly Election 2003: Vale of Clwyd
Party	Candidate	Constituency			Regional		
Party	Candidate	Votes	%	±%	Votes	%	±%
Labour	Ann Jones	8,256	46.2	+8.6	7,175	40.0	+3.4
Conservative	Darren Millar	5,487	30.7	+8.1	5,122	28.5	+4.6
Plaid Cymru	Malcolm W. Evans	2,516	14.1	−5.2	2,674	14.9	-9.0
Liberal Democrats	Robina L. Feeley	1,630	9.1	+2.9	1,664	9.3	+0.1
Green					410	2.3	Unknown
John Marek Independent Party					394	2.2	New
UKIP					363	2.0	New
Cymru Annibynnol					80	0.4	New
Communist					53	0.3	Unknown
ProLife Alliance					19	0.1	New
Majority		2,769	15.5	+0.5			
Turnout		17,889	36.5	−7.0			
Labour hold		Swing	+0.2				

2003 Electorate: 49,319
Regional ballots rejected: 534

=== Elections in the 1990s ===
Welsh Assembly Election 1999: Vale of Clwyd
Party	Candidate	Constituency			Regional		
Party	Candidate	Votes	%	±%	Votes	%	±%
Labour	Ann Jones	8,359	37.6	N/A	8,111	36.6	N/A
Conservative	Robert Salisbury	5,018	22.6	N/A	5,292	23.9	N/A
Plaid Cymru	Sion Brynach	4,295	19.3	N/A	5,295	23.9	N/A
Ind Dem	Gwynn A. Clague	1,908	8.6	N/A			
Liberal Democrats	Phill Lloyd	1,376	6.2	N/A	2,046	9.2	N/A
Independent	David I. Roberts	661	3.0	N/A			
Independent	David A.P. Pennant	586	2.6	N/A			
Green					Unknown	Unknown	N/A
Rhuddlan Debt Protest Campaign					Unknown	Unknown	N/A
United Socialist					Unknown	Unknown	N/A
Communist					Unknown	Unknown	N/A
Natural Law					Unknown	Unknown	N/A
Above list parties					1,406	6.3	N/A
Majority		3,341	15.0	N/A			
Turnout		22,203	43.5	N/A			
Labour win (new seat)							

== See also ==
- North Wales (Senedd electoral region)
- Senedd constituencies and electoral regions
