= Altaf Hussain (Welsh politician) =

Welsh politician

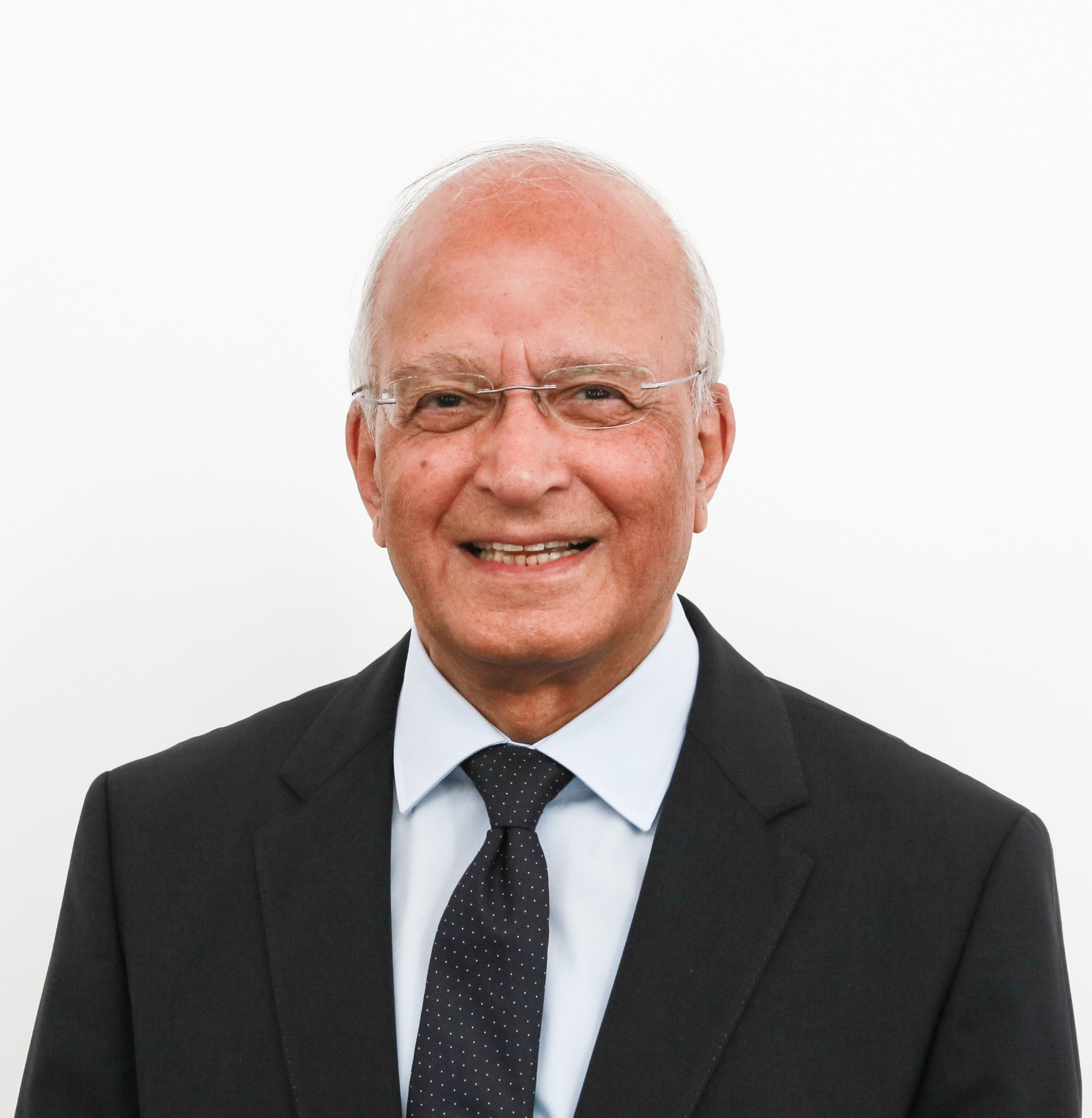
- Hussain in 2021

Shadow Minister for Social Care
- In office 18 April 2024 – 7 May 2026
- Leader: Andrew RT Davies; Darren Miller
- Preceded by: Gareth Davies Social Services

Shadow Minister for Equalities
- In office 27 May 2021 – 18 April 2024
- Preceded by: Laura Anne Jones March 2021
- Succeeded by: Role not in use

Member of the Senedd for South Wales West
- In office 6 May 2021 – 7 April 2026
- Preceded by: Suzy Davies
- Succeeded by: Constituency abolished
- In office 19 May 2015 – 5 May 2016
- Preceded by: Byron Davies
- Succeeded by: David Lloyd

Personal details
- Born: Srinagar, India
- Party: Conservative
- Education: University of Kashmir, MS; University of Liverpool, M.Ch.Orth
- Occupation: Surgeon
- Website: www.altafhussain.wales

Altaf Hussain is a Welsh Conservative politician, serving from 2015 to 2016 and then from 2021 to 2026 as the Member of the Senedd for South Wales West. He is also a retired consultant orthopaedic surgeon.

Prior to dissolution of the fourth assembly, he sat on the Health Committee at the National Assembly for Wales, and was Shadow Minister for Social Services. He was defeated in the 2016 Welsh Assembly elections. In 2017 he was elected to Bridgend County Borough Council. He is also a Patron on Brynawel Rehab.

== Early life and education ==
Born in Srinagar, India; .In 1972 he graduated as a Master of Surgery from the University of Kashmir, and in 1982 was awarded a second Master of Surgery degree, in Orthopaedic surgery, by the University of Liverpool.

== Medical career ==
Hussain was an orthopaedic surgeon for NHS Wales before his selection as a Welsh Conservative Assembly candidate. He was based at the Prince Charles Hospital in Merthyr Tydfil.

As a surgeon, his work in developing the Notch Trial method in total knee replacement surgery was showcased at the World Orthopaedic Conference in November 2013. He also pioneered teaching the thumb index reference technique in total hip replacement when instructing trainee surgeons.

He is a recipient of the Best Practice Team Award 2007 and the Glory of India Award 2008.

Hussain has worked extensively in his native Kashmir to improve access to healthcare in what he calls 'peripheral areas' and worked closely with the Chief Minister, Mufti Mohammad Sayeed in this area. Hussain's obituary of Sayeed and his account of their professional involvement together was published in the newspapers Greater Kashmir and Rising Kashmir.

He remains active in orthopaedic research and continues to deliver lectures on a 'pro bono' basis.

In September 2016-September 2017 Hussain was appointed a trustee of Age Cymru Swansea Bay.

== Political career ==
Hussain has been a supporter of the UK Conservative Party since the 1980s, and has held several offices in the Welsh Conservative Party, including Deputy Chairman of Bridgend Conservative Association – of which he has been an active member since 2009. Altaf has served on the Board of the Welsh Conservative Party since 2012, when he was elected as chairman for the South Wales West Area.

He previously represented Pen-y-fai, Bridgend on Newcastle Higher Community Council from 2011 to 2022 and Bridgend County Borough Council from 2017-2022.

In the 2015 United Kingdom general election Hussain stood for the Welsh Conservatives in the Swansea East constituency.

=== Senedd ===
Hussain contested the 2011 National Assembly for Wales election as the third placed candidate on the Welsh Conservative list for South Wales West. He was not successful at the election, but joined the National Assembly for Wales as the next candidate on the Conservative Party's list in 2015, after Byron Davies stood down upon his election as MP for Gower. He became the second Muslim member of the Assembly (after Mohammad Asghar, also a Conservative AM until his death in 2020).

He was re-selected for the Welsh Conservatives' South Wales West list at the 2016 Welsh Assembly elections, placing second on the list. However, he was not successful, as the Welsh Conservatives only received enough votes for one candidate.

Hussain was re-elected to the Senedd at the 2021 election, again for the South Wales West constituency. Shortly after he was appointed as Welsh Conservative Deputy Whip and Shadow Minister for Equalities. In 2024 he was reshuffled to the role of Shadow Minister for Social Care.

=== Issues and campaigns ===
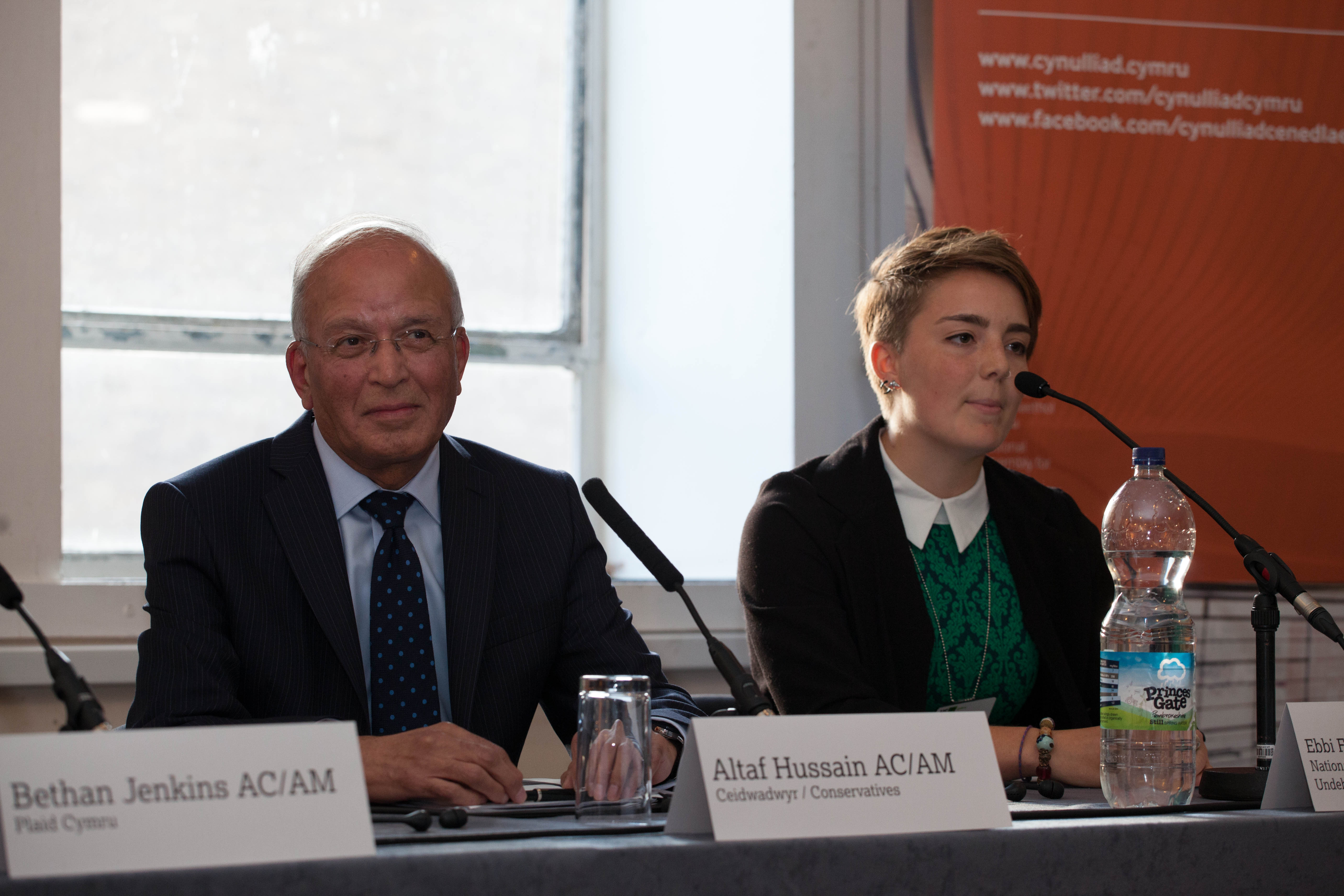
Hussain in 2016

As an Assembly Member, Hussain has campaigned on a number of local and national issues.

He has worked with St John Cymru Wales to further their goal of having a 'first aider on every street', running community first responder training sessions in Swansea as well as working to help bring their cycle responder unit project that has been successfully piloted in Cardiff further west to Swansea and Bridgend. He has also campaigned for all schools in Wales to have defibrillators.

Hussain has been a strong proponent of improving town centres and reducing unoccupancy rates, speaking out about problems with the road layout of Swansea's Kingsway prior to the council making changes. He has argued in the local press for lower business rates, better parking facilities and against the closure of public toilet facilities. In February 2016 Hussain was criticised by Swansea City Council for calling for the county's education budget to be protected in the latest budget.

He has also taken a close interest on the impact of energy policy on local communities and presented evidence to the public inquiry into the proposed land exchange deal that would allow for the construction of a wind farm at the Mynydd-y-Gwair site near Felindre in the north of Swansea, to which he had formally objected. He has also sought clarity from the Welsh Government on its policy on underground coal bed gasification and has supported local campaigns against exploratory drilling. Hussain has been a supporter of the Swansea Bay Tidal Lagoon proposal but has argued that an appropriate strike price must be agreed first and the project should not be rushed.

Hussain regularly speaks on matters related to health and social care, campaigning for pro-active 'stay at home assessments' to be offered to anyone so wanting one upon reaching retirement age which he argues will reduce delays in the transfer of patient care from the hospital to the home care setting and will enable older people to remain for longer in their own homes. He has chaired a number of seminars relating to Health and Social Care policy with the Institute of Welsh Affairs and Policy Forum for Wales, of which he is a patron. In March 2016 Hussain announced the new Welsh Conservative policy of capping care home costs and protecting a minimum level of assets for anyone needing residential care at the party's annual conference as part of an integrated approach to Health and Social Care policy by the party.

In January 2016 he was asked to apologise by the First Minister for suggesting that poor standards in Welsh schools were acting as a deterrent to doctors considering moving to Wales but refused, saying that this was a concern highlighted by bodies representing senior doctors and demanding instead an apology from the First Minister for his government 'taking its eye off the ball' in what became a heated row. He also called for the new system of measuring ambulance response times in Wales to be scrapped, arguing that they produce incomplete data.

Hussain has spoken out to highlight his opposition to the proposed 'sugar tax' and as to whether locum doctors' earnings in Wales should be subject to a cap. He has also expressed his concern about the high levels of anti-depressant prescription by GPs in Wales and called for improved access to talking therapies.

He has written a detailed article about winter pressures in the Welsh NHS in December 2016 for South Wales Evening Post. The newspaper cited his article in calling for a mature and evidence-driven debate on health as one of '20 things we want to see in Swansea in 2016'.

He campaigned against the closure of more hospital beds in the Abertawe Bro Morgannwg University Health Board area.

His other campaigns have included ensuring that communities in Porthcawl are properly protected by the Welsh Government's proposed Shoreline Management Plan, calling for improved classroom access to services for children with autism and moderate learning difficulties and facilitating more frequent bus services to communities in Gower.

Hussain has argued that the committee structure of the Welsh Assembly should be strengthened to make the Welsh Government more accountable to AMs as well as for greater media coverage of proceedings in the Chamber.

Following the announcement in March 2016 that Tata Steel was to sell its UK operation, Hussain was amongst a number of elected politicians who argued that the UK government would be right to take a partial stake in the Port Talbot plant in order to ensure its survival.

In June 2016, Hussain organised a public debate on the forthcoming EU Referendum along with former Aberavon Welsh Assembly candidate David Jenkins, inviting speakers from both sides to present their arguments at Swansea University.

In January 2022, Hussain was noted for criticising his own party's leader, Prime Minister Boris Johnson, saying that he had lost the trust of the public.

Preceded by Byron Davies	Assembly Member for South Wales West; 2015–2016	Succeeded by David Lloyd
Preceded by Suzy Davies	Member of the Senedd for South Wales West; 2021 to present	Incumbent
