= Peter Fox (Welsh politician) =

British Conservative politician

Peter Fox OBE MS
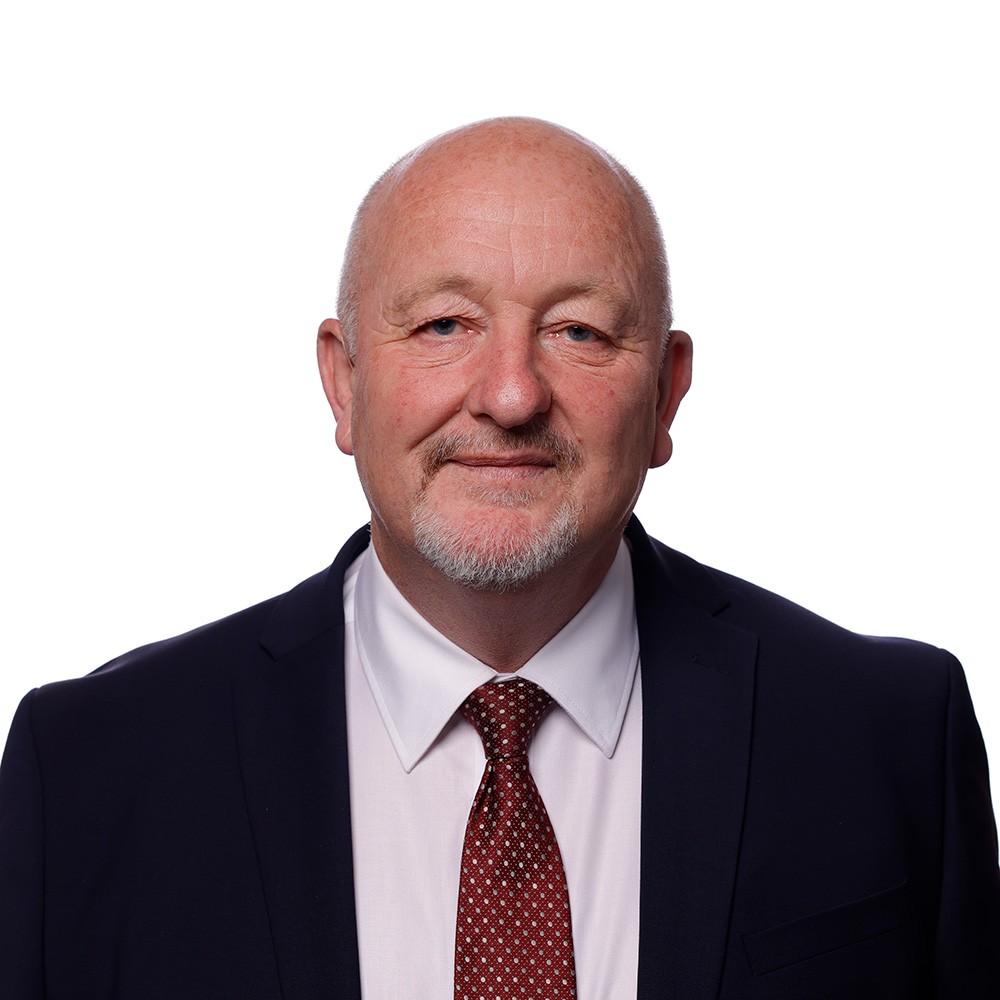
- Official portrait, 2026

Shadow Cabinet Secretary For Transport and Rural Affairs
- In office 12 December 2024 – 20 January 2026
- Leader: Darren Millar
- Preceded by: Natasha Asghar Transport; James Evans Rural Affairs
- Succeeded by: Jason O'Connell Transport; Laura Anne Jones Rural Affairs

Shadow Minister for Finance (Note: and Local Government April–December 2024)
- In office 27 May 2021 – 5 December 2024
- Preceded by: Mark Isherwood
- Succeeded by: Sam Rowlands

Member of the Senedd
- Incumbent
- Assumed office 7 May 2021
- Preceded by: Nick Ramsay
- Constituency: Monmouth (2021–2026); Sir Fynwy Torfaen (2026–present)

Leader of Monmouthshire County Council
- In office May 2008 – 7 May 2021
- Preceded by: Andrew Crump
- Succeeded by: Richard John

Monmouthshire County Councillor for Portskewett ward
- In office November 1997 – 5 May 2022

Personal details
- Born: 24 December 1961 (age 64)
- Party: Conservative
- Spouse: Joanne Fox
- Children: 4
- Education: Carmarthen Agricultural & Technical College
- Occupation: Farmer
- Profession: Politician

Peter Alan Fox OBE (born 24 December 1961) is a British Conservative politician who is the Shadow Cabinet Secretary for Transport and Rural Affairs in the Senedd. Fox was Leader of Monmouthshire County Council from 2008 until May 2021, when he was elected as a Member of the Senedd (MS) for the Monmouth constituency; he then became MS for Sir Fynwy Torfaen from May 2026.

== Background ==
Fox runs a farm in Portskewett in the south of Monmouthshire.

In 1990 Fox and his wife Joanne moved to Portskewett, Monmouthshire, to be dairy farmers. In recent years the enterprise has turned to beef livestock production. Fox had previously set up a small business selling plastic agricultural products.

His family were dairy farmers, who farmed in Warwickshire, England. The family moved to farm in Carmarthenshire in the 1970s and then to Penallt, Monmouthshire in 1981. He was educated at Ystrad Tywi Secondary School in Carmarthen and then went on to Carmarthen Agricultural & Technical College.

He was a founder member of the Gwent Buyers Group, which served the purchasing needs of approximately twenty farmers. He initiated a scheme to bring rural life into the classroom at Sudbrook School, integrating it into the National Curriculum. He has been a regular host to local schools – creating living classrooms at the farm. He has also hosted International farm visits from Romania and from China.

== Career ==
In 2013 Fox was a ministerial appointment to the Cardiff Capital Region Board and the subsequent Cardiff Capital Region Transitional Panel.

In 2016 he was instrumental in negotiating and securing a City Deal worth £1.3 billion for the Cardiff Capital Region – the biggest City Deal in the UK. He was made Vice Chairman of the Cardiff Capital Region Joint Cabinet, holding the Portfolio for Business and Innovation.

Fox was awarded an OBE in the 2017 New Year Honours,for services to the Cardiff Capital Region.

== Political career ==
=== Local government ===
Fox served as the Conservative county councillor for the Portskewett electoral ward on Monmouthshire County Council from 1997 to 2022. He was first elected in November 1997 and re-elected at the subsequent 2004, 2008, 2012, and 2017 elections before standing down and not contesting the 2022 elections.

Fox became Leader of Monmouthshire County Council in May 2008 when the Conservative group replaced the previous leader, Cllr Andrew Crump. Before this, he was Deputy Leader, with responsibility for education. He served as leader of the council until he was elected to the Senedd in May 2021. He stood down as Portskewett Councillor at the 2022 Monmouthshire County Council elections.

=== Senedd ===
Fox stood as Conservative candidate in the 2007 Assembly elections for the Newport East constituency, though failed to win.

In March 2021, Fox was selected as the Conservative candidate in the Monmouth constituency for the 2021 Senedd elections. The sitting Conservative MS, Nick Ramsay, had been deselected by the local party. Fox won the election, on 6 May 2021, with a reduced majority of 3,485.

He was appointed shadow minister for finance in late May 2021. Soon into his term, he called for Welsh Government-funded free parking and voucher schemes for town centres in Monmouth to provide a much-needed boost to footfall, as well as leading the voices of concern regarding the relegation of the Abergavenny Women's Football Club.

In August, Fox became a Champion for the Motor Neurone Disease charity and called on the Welsh Government to introduce a fast-track adaptations scheme to homes owned by people suffering with the disease. Fox then held a debate, calling on the Welsh Government to support the introduction of a fast-track and non-means tested process for home adaptations for those living with the disease in Wales. The debate passed, with substantial support from all politicians.

Fox has spoken of the importance of local produce; he then introduced a proposed bill in October 2021 – which gathered support from across Wales, including professors – calling for the prioritisation of local produce, as well as statutory requirements for origin labelling for food consumed in a hospitality setting, which passed the first round in the Senedd. The next stage to the Bill will commence in the coming months.

In December 2024, after the resignation of Andrew RT Davies, Fox was appointed as Shadow Cabinet Secretary for Transport and Rural Affairs by new leader Darren Millar.

In the 2026 Senedd election, he was the top Conservative candidate in Sir Fynwy Torfaen and was reelected.

== Political views ==
=== Universal basic income ===
Fox criticised universal basic income (UBI), which pays everyone a fixed sum, regardless of their circumstance, saying, "Means-testing and fairness is of fundamental importance to the integrity of our welfare state, unlike UBI, which would reward the wealthiest in society instead of targeting those who need it most." In an article for Mail+, he warned that introducing UBI would mean giving financial contributions to "Premier League footballers, millionaires rapists and murderers", rather than financially "targeting those who need it most".

== Notes ==
Senedd
Preceded by Nick Ramsay	Member of the Senedd for Monmouth; 2021–present	Incumbent
