= Laura Anne Jones =

British politician (born 1979)

Laura Anne Jones MS
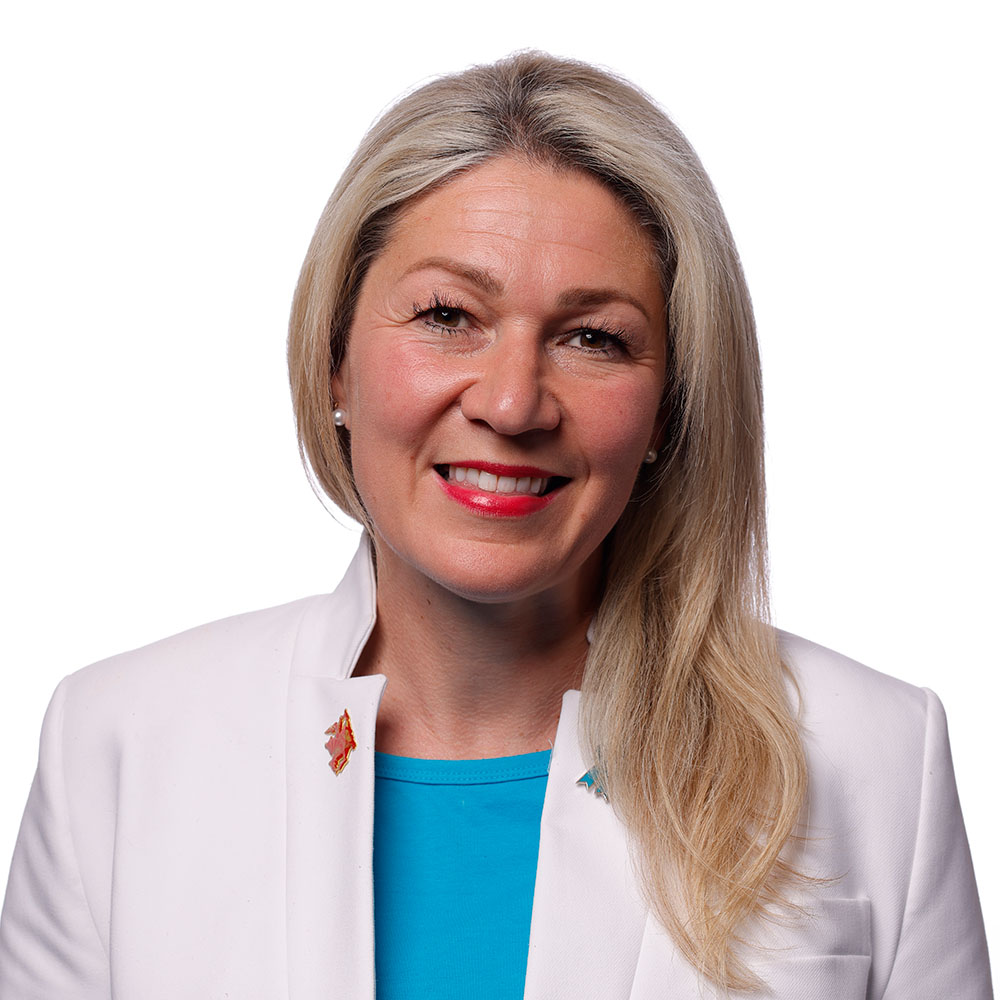
- Official portrait, 2026

Deputy Leader of Reform UK Wales
- Incumbent
- Assumed office 22 September 2026
- Leader: Helen Jenner
- Preceded by: Helen Jenner
Shadow Cabinet roles
Shadow Cabinet Minister for Food, Farming and Agriculture
Incumbent
Assumed office 19 May 2026
| Leader | Dan Thomas; Helen Jenner |
| Preceded by | Peter Fox (Note: as Shadow Cabinet Secretary for Transport and Rural Affairs) |
Shadow Cabinet Secretary for Local Government, Housing and the Armed Forces
In office 12 December 2024 – 22 July 2025
| Leader | Darren Millar |
| Preceded by | Peter Fox (Note: as Shadow Cabinet Secretary For Transport and Rural Affairs); Mark Isherwood (Note: as Shadow Minister for Housing and Planning) |
| Succeeded by | Joel James (Note: as Shadow Minister for Local Government and Housing. Responsibility for the Armed Forces was passed to James Evans.) |
In office 24 January 2021 – 29 March 2021
| Leader | Andrew RT Davies |
| Preceded by | David Melding (Note: asShadow Cabinet Secretary for Housing, Heritage, Culture, and Media); Mark Isherwood (Note: as Shadow Minister for Communities and Local Government) |
| Succeeded by | Sam Rowlands |
Shadow Minister for Culture, Tourism and Sport
In office 3 December 2024 – 12 December 2024
| Leader | Andrew RT Davies |
| Preceded by | Herself |
| Succeeded by | Altaf Hussein |
In office 18 April 2024 – 14 June 2024
| Leader | Andrew RT Davies |
| Preceded by | Tom Giffard |
| Succeeded by | Herself |
Shadow Minister for Education
In office 27 May 2021 – 18 April 2024
| Leader | Andrew RT Davies |
| Preceded by | Suzy Davies |
| Succeeded by | Tom Giffard |
Shadow Minister for Equalities, Children and Young People
In office 17 July 2020 – 29 March 2021
| Leader | Paul Davies; Andrew RT Davies |
| Preceded by | Janet Finch-Saunders (Note: As Shadow Minister for Children and Young People) |
| Succeeded by | Altaf Hussein (Note: As Shadow Minister for Equalities) |

Member of the Senedd
- Incumbent
- Assumed office 6 July 2020
- Preceded by: Mohammad Asghar
- Constituency: South Wales East (2020–2026); Sir Fynwy Torfaen (2026–present)
- In office 1 May 2003 – 3 May 2007
- Preceded by: Phil Williams
- Succeeded by: Mohammad Asghar
- Constituency: South Wales East

Monmouthshire County Councillor for Wyesham Ward
- In office 5 May 2017 – 5 May 2022
- Preceded by: Liz Hacket Pain
- Succeeded by: Emma Bryn

Personal details
- Born: Laura Anne Jones; 21 February 1979 (age 47) Newport, Wales
- Party: Reform UK (since 2025)
- Other political affiliations: Conservative (1996–2025)
- Education: University of Plymouth (BSc)
- Occupation: Politician
- Website: lauraannejones.wales

Laura Anne Jones (born 21 February 1979) is a Welsh politician who has been the Member of the Senedd (MS) since 2020, first for the South Wales East electoral region since July 2020, and since May 2026 for Sir Fynwy Torfaen, having previously held the same seat as an Assembly Member (AM) in the National Assembly for Wales between 2003 and 2007.

She defected to Reform UK in July 2025, having previously represented the Welsh Conservatives. Jones also served as a county councillor for the Wyesham ward in Monmouthshire County Council from 2017 to 2022.

She was elected as Deputy Leader of Reform UK Wales on 22 September 2026.

== Background ==
The daughter of a farmer and a lecturer, Jones was born in Newport and brought up in Monmouthshire. She attended the University of Plymouth, where she studied politics.

== Political career ==
She joined the Conservatives in 1996 at age 16, and was involved in Conservative Future, the party's youth wing.

=== First Senedd period (2003–2007) ===
Jones contested the South Wales East list and the Caerphilly constituency at the 2003 Welsh Assembly elections. She came third in Caerphilly, with 10.1% of the vote, but was elected to represent South Wales East, as the third Conservative on the list. Two Conservatives were elected to represent the seat, and the seat's top candidate, David T. C. Davies was elected to represent the Monmouth constituency, meaning Jones was elected from third place. She was the youngest member of the Second Assembly, and the joint-first Welsh Conservative female AM. She said to the BBC at the time that she was "completely shocked" to have been elected. She was appointed as the Conservative spokeswoman on sport, and sat on the Culture, Sport and Welsh Language, and Local Government and Public Services committees.

During her time as Welsh Conservative Sports Spokesperson she criticised the Welsh Government's plans to provide free summertime swimming in 2003, arguing that free swimming lessons would have been a better use of money.

Her profile was increased when she appeared on the BBC television programme Question Time in February 2004.

Jones attempted to gain the nomination to replace David TC Davies as candidate for the Monmouth constituency, after Davies was elected to the UK Parliament. She did not receive the seat, with Nick Ramsay, then a party staffer in the Assembly, being selected. Jones lost her seat in the Assembly in the 2007 Assembly election when Plaid Cymru gained one seat in the South Wales East region at the expense of the Conservatives.

In January 2007, Jones claimed for a £1,109.94 television on her expenses.

=== Between Senedd terms ===
At the 2015 general election she contested the safe Labour seat of Islwyn for the Conservatives and finished third with 5,366 votes. At the 2019 general election she contested the Labour seat of Blaenau Gwent for the Conservatives and finished third with 5,749 votes.

In the 2017 Welsh local elections she was elected to the Wyesham ward on Monmouthshire County Council winning 42% of the vote and defeating Welsh Labour's Catherine Fookes. She did not contest the 2022 Monmouthshire County Council elections. Her previous ward, Wyesham, elected an independent candidate (Emma Bryn).

=== Second Senedd period (2020–present) ===
Following the death of Mohammad Asghar in June 2020, it was confirmed in July 2020 that Jones would become the MS for South Wales East, having been the next Conservative candidate on the regional list in the Assembly's 2016 election. She was appointed as Shadow Minister for Equalities, Children and Young People by Paul Davies shortly after. In January 2021, after Paul Davies stood down as leader and was replaced by Andrew RT Davies, when her role was expanded to include Housing and Local Government. These roles ceased to be shadow ministries in March 2021, after Nick Ramsay stood down to contest the 2021 Senedd Elections as an independent.

She was re-elected at the 2021 Senedd election. After the elections, she was appointed as Shadow Minister for Education. She held this role until the April 2024 reshuffle, where she was moved to the Shadow Culture portfolio, which she held for just under 2 months.

In 2021, past Facebook posts from Jones surfaced in which she said "I would like to do a spot of chav shooting" and "a shame that isn't legal." Jones apologised for the comments.

Jones left the Shadow Cabinet in June 2024, to face investigation by the South Wales Police and the Senedd's Standards Commissioner over allegations relating to her expenses. In November 2025, she was cleared of any wrongdoing relating to her expenses.

In September 2024, former AM and Wales Secretary David T. C. Davies joined Jones' staff.

Shortly after Andrew RT Davies announced his resignation as leader of the Welsh Conservatives, in December of 2024, he told the BBC that Jones had been re-admitted into the Shadow Cabinet as Shadow Minister for Culture, Tourism and Sport. Jones voted that she had confidence in Davies, and seconded a motion requiring the vote to be held as a show of hands, rather than as a secret ballot as had initially been expected.

After Darren Millar took leadership of the Welsh Conservative Party, Jones was reshuffled to the role of Shadow Cabinet Secretary for Local Government, Housing and the Armed Forces.

==== Expenses and conduct investigations ====
In May 2024 it was reported that Jones was being investigated by both South Wales Police and the Senedd’s Standards Commissioner for allegedly falsifying expenses claims. In June 2024, messages were released which appeared to show Jones instructing staff to claim expenses for more petrol than she used. Jones was asked to stand down from her role in Welsh Conservative Shadow Cabinet shortly after the release of the messages. In October 2024, the investigation into this matter was re-opened, having been apparently dropped at an unknown earlier point in time. In December 2024, she was cleared of any wrongdoing relating to her expenses by the South Wales Police, with the investigation being handed back to the Senedd Standards Commissioner, Douglas Bain.

In August 2024, further messages were released that showed Jones using a racist slur, saying "No chinky spies for me!", in the context of discussion about use of the social media app TikTok within the Welsh Conservative group. Her use of the term was condemned by Welsh Conservative colleague Natasha Asghar, who said she was "positively livid" and that "language like this is unacceptable at every level".

Jones was formally cleared of any wrongdoing in relation to her expenses in November 2025. However, she was found to have brought the Senedd into disrepute and breached rules against not engaging in discrimination for her previous use of racial slurs in text messages. In early November, the Standards Committee recommended a 14-day Senedd ban for the rule breach. This recommendation was unopposed, meaning Jones will be suspended from 20 November 2025 to 3 December 2025.

In the Plenary session during which Jones' suspension was approved unopposed, Jones made a statement discussing the impact the investigation into her expenses had had on her and her family, and stated she had considered suicide on multiple occasions. She stated she would campaign to improve the process of being under investigation for other Senedd members.

In late September 2025, WalesOnline reported that between Jones' Senedd terms she had been involved in a controversial multi-level marketing scheme, in which sales reps progressed to higher levels depending partly on how many people they recruited. Jones was reported to have made misleading claims about cancer risks from rival products and about the financial rewards of joining the scheme.

In October 2025, Jones was accused of preventing staff from speaking about her behaviour and conduct in office using non-disclosure agreements, paid for using public money. She claimed £1,876 in expenses for legal fees in 2024/25.

In November 2025 she was suspended from the Welsh Senedd for 14 days for use of a racial slur.

==== Defection to Reform UK ====
On 22 July 2025, Jones announced at the Royal Welsh Show that she had left the Welsh Conservative Party and joined Reform UK. She said that she could no longer justify decisions the party had made when she was talking to voters on the doorstep. She did so without notifying members of her former party. Former colleague James Evans described her defection as "like a kick in the teeth", saying that the Welsh Conservatives had supported Jones "through thick and thin".

Following her defection, Jones said that Reform UK may consider abolishing the Senedd if it cannot be made to "work for Wales". On the 2026 Senedd election she said "party policy is to go into this election to win. The failure of the Senedd is to do with 26 years of Labour and Plaid Cymru".

== Personal life ==
In December 2002 she was banned from driving for a year and fined £75 for drunk driving, having been caught by the police while around 35% over the legal limit.

== See also ==
- List of Conservative Party defections to Reform UK

== Footnotes ==
Party political offices
| Preceded by Helen Jenner | Deputy Leader of Reform UK Wales; 2026-present | Incumbent |
Senedd
| Preceded by Phil Williams | Member of the Welsh National Assembly for South Wales East; 2003-2007 | Succeeded by Mohammad Asghar |
| Preceded by Jonathan Morgan | Baby of the House; 2003–2007 | Succeeded by Bethan Jenkins |
| Preceded by Mohammad Asghar | Member of the Senedd for South Wales East; 2020-2026 | Constituency abolished |
| New constituency | Member of the Senedd for Sir Fynwy Torfaen; 2026–present | Incumbent |
