= Sam Rowlands =

Welsh politician

Sam Rowlands MS
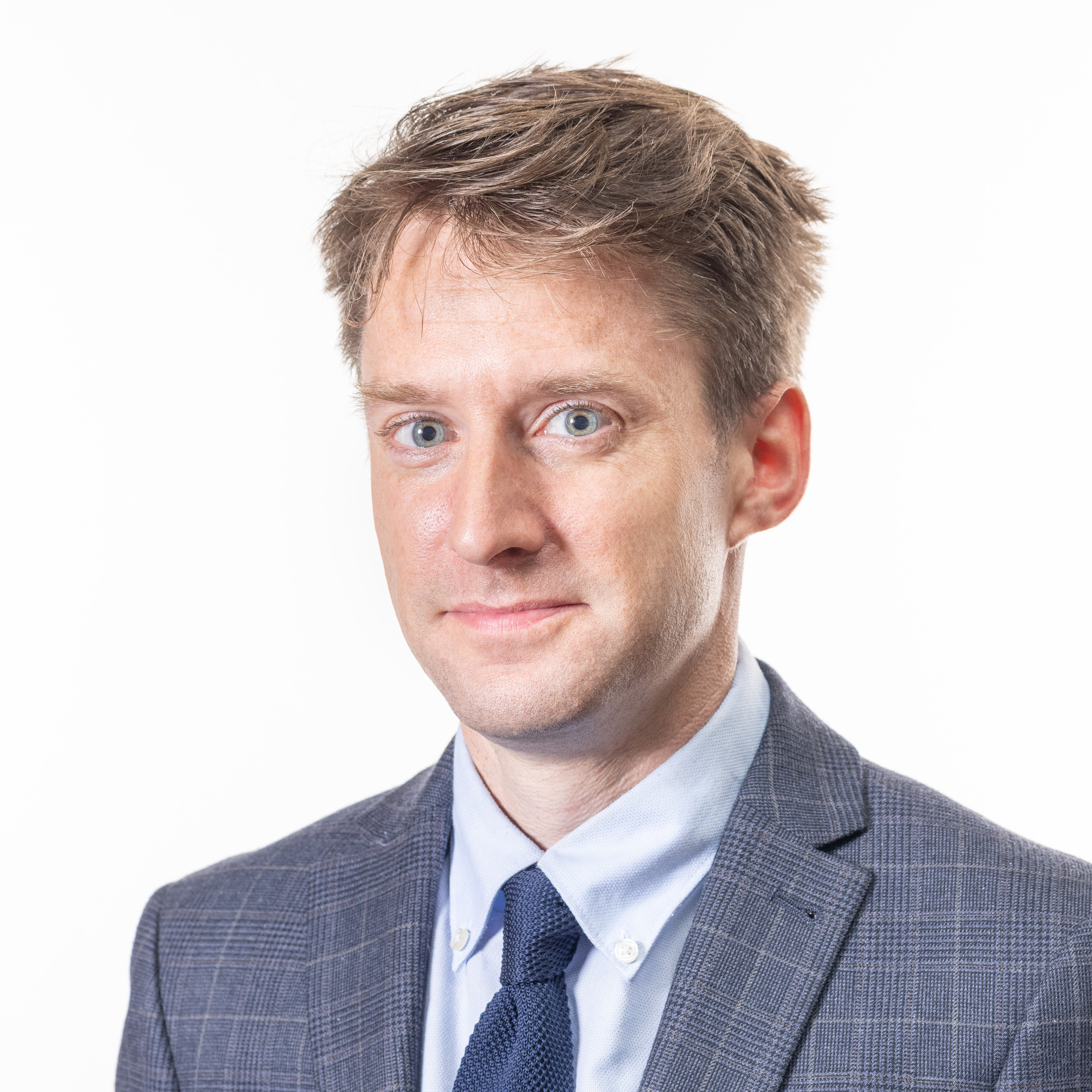
- Rowlands in 2021

Shadow Cabinet Secretary for Finance
- In office 12 December 2024 – 20 January 2026
- Leader: Darren Millar
- Preceded by: Peter Fox
- Succeeded by: Cai Parry-Jones (May 2026)

Shadow Minister for Health
- In office 18 April 2024 – 5 December 2024
- Leader: Andrew RT Davies
- Preceded by: Russell George
- Succeeded by: James Evans

Shadow Minister for Local Government
- In office 27 May 2021 – 18 April 2024
- Preceded by: Laura Anne Jones (Note: As Shadow Minister for Housing and Local Government, Equalities, Children and Young People)
- Succeeded by: Peter Fox (Note: As Shadow Minister for Finance and Local Government)

Member of the Senedd for North Wales
- Incumbent
- Assumed office 8 May 2021

Leader of Conwy County Borough Council
- In office 3 June 2019 – 13 May 2021
- Preceded by: Gareth Jones
- Succeeded by: Charlie McCoubrey

Conwy County Borough Councillor for Pentre Mawr Ward
- In office 2 May 2008 – 5 May 2022

Personal details
- Born: Bangor, Wales
- Party: Conservative
- Spouse: Natasha Rowlands
- Children: 3
- Committees: Local Government and Housing Committee

Sam Rowlands is a Welsh Conservative politician who has served as Member of the Senedd (MS) since 2021, first for the North Wales electoral region and then, since 2026 for Fflint Wrecsam. and Shadow Cabinet Secretary for Finance since December 2024. He has also formerly served as Shadow Health Minister, and as the Leader of Conwy County Borough Council from 2019 to 2021.

== Personal Life and Career ==
Rowlands was born in Bangor. He moved to Abergele when he was nine.

Rowlands worked for HSBC from 2009 to 2019 as a credit risk manager. He holds a degree in Business Management.

Rowlands is married, and has three daughters.

== Political career ==
Rowlands began his career as a member of Conwy County Borough Council and Abergele Town Council, being first elected in the 2008 Welsh Local Government Elections. He represented the Pentre Mawr electoral ward. He served as the mayor of Abergele from 2015 to 2016. Rowlands also stood in the Vale of Clwyd in the 2016 Welsh Assembly Election. He was not elected.

After the 2017 Conwy County Borough Council elections, Rowlands formed part of the minority Conservative-Independent administration run by Gareth Jones, serving as the Cabinet Member for Finance and Resources between June 2017 and June 2019. In June 2019, Rowlands was removed from this role by Jones, after holding talks to take control of the council. Rowlands then tabled a no-confidence motion in Jones' leadership, and took control of the council, which he led until 2021, when he resigned as leader upon being elected as Member of the Senedd for the North Wales electoral region. He served the remainder of his term as a Councillor, leaving the role at the 2022 elections, which he did not contest.

Following his election to the Senedd, Rowlands was appointed Shadow Minister for Local Government. He re-established the Cross Party Group on Tourism. Rowlands led a campaign working with Conwy County Borough Council to re-establish the Conwy County Borough School's Football Association in 2021. Rowlands has spoken on the importance of sport to keep people fit and healthy as well as a driver for economic development in the Welsh Parliament. In 2022 he also became the Chairman of Welsh Parliament Cross Party Group on the Outdoor Activity Sector. He is also a member of the Health and Social Care committee, as well as a member of cross party groupings on Armed Forces and Cadets, Beer and Pubs, Horseracing, Industrial Communities, North Wales, Renewable and Low Carbon Energy, Rural Growth, Sport, and Welsh Wool.

In a reshuffle in April 2024, Rowlands was appointed as Shadow Health Minister. After the resignation of Andrew RT Davies and election of Darren Millar as leader of the Welsh Conservatives, Rowlands was appointed as Shadow Cabinet Secretary for Finance.

In the 2026 Senedd election was elected for the Fflint Wrecsam constituency.

=== Residential Outdoor Education (Wales) Bill ===
During July 2022 Rowlands's proposed Residential Outdoor Education (Wales) Bill was drawn in the Welsh Parliament's ballot of proposed member's bills. On 26 October 2022 the Welsh Parliament voted to allow time and resources to be committed to developing this legislation further, with support from Conservative, Plaid Cymru and Liberal Democrat MSs. Labour opposed the bill. In April 2024, the bill was rejected by the Senedd, after a motion to agree the general principles of the bill failed.
