= James Evans (Welsh politician) =

Welsh politician (born 1991)

James Evans MS
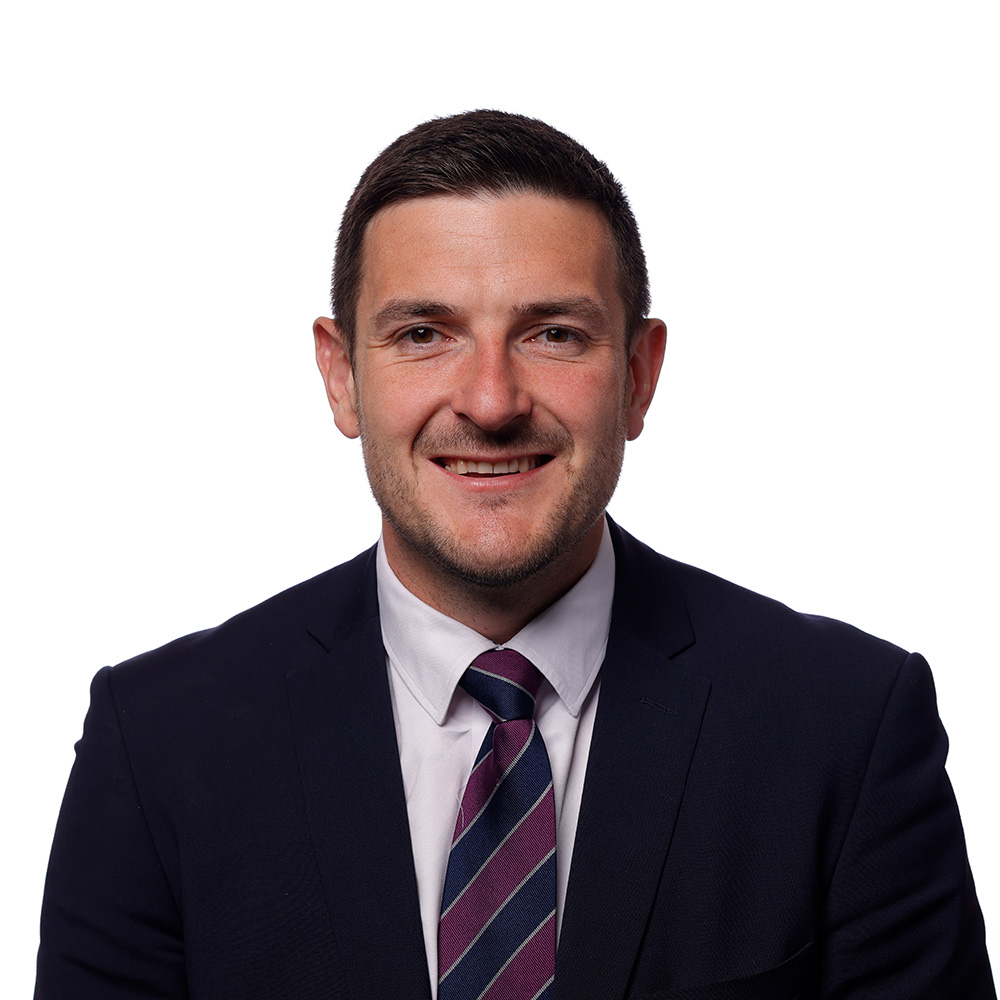
- Official portrait, 2026

Shadow Cabinet Minister for Health, Prevention and Sport (Note: As Shadow Cabinet Secretary for Health and Social Care 2024-2026)
- In office 19 May 2026 – 23 September 2026
- Leader: Dan Thomas
- Preceded by: Himself (Health); Gareth Davies (Sport)
- Succeeded by: Benjamin Hodge Mckenna
- In office 12 December 2024 – 20 January 2026
- Leader: Darren Millar
- Preceded by: Sam Rowlands
- Succeeded by: Himself (Health); Claire Archibald (Social Care)
Past Welsh Conservative Shadow Cabinet Roles
Shadow Minister for Rural Affairs
In office 18 April 2024 – 5 December 2024
Leader	Andrew RT Davies
Preceded by	Samuel Kurtz (Note: As shadow minister for rural affairs and the Welsh language)
Succeeded by	Peter Fox
Shadow Minister for Mental Health, Wellbeing and Mid Wales
In office 27 May 2021 – 18 April 2024
Leader	Andrew RT Davies
Preceded by	David Melding (Note: As shadow minister for mental health, wellbeing, culture and sport)
Succeeded by	Gareth Davies (Mental Health); Paul Davies (Mid Wales)

Member of the Senedd for Brycheiniog Tawe Nedd Brecon and Radnorshire (2021–2026)
- Incumbent
- Assumed office 7 May 2021
- Preceded by: Kirsty Williams

Powys County Councillor for Gwernyfed ward
- In office 5 May 2017 – 5 May 2022
- Preceded by: Geraint Hopkins
- Succeeded by: William Lloyd

Personal details
- Born: James Oswald David Evans Brecon, Wales
- Party: Reform UK (since 2026)
- Other political affiliations: Conservative (until 2026)
- Occupation: Farmer

James Oswald David Evans is a Welsh Reform UK politician and farmer, who has served as a Member of the Senedd (MS) since the 2021 Senedd election, first for Brecon and Radnorshire and then, since 2026, for Brycheiniog Tawe Nedd. He also served as Shadow Minister for Health, Prevention and Sport.

Evans was a member of the Welsh Conservative Party until January 2026 and was the Shadow Cabinet Secretary for Health and Social Care from December 2024 to January 2026. In January 2026 he was expelled from the Conservative Party and joined Reform UK. He previously served as councillor for Gwernyfed ward on Powys County Council.

== Political career ==
James Evans had been elected to Powys County Council in 2017, representing the Gwernyfed ward, and was cabinet member for economic development, housing and regulatory services. In 2018 he was criticised for retaining this cabinet role while in New Zealand for two months on a National Farmers' Union scholarship to study deer farming and venison production.

At the 2021 Senedd elections, Evans contested the Brecon and Radnorshire constituency and was elected, becoming the first Conservative MS for this constituency. He maintained his role as a councillor until the 2022 Powys County Council elections, which he did not contest. Shortly after being elected in 2021, Evans was appointed as Shadow Minister for Mental Health. Evans was moved to the Shadow Rural Affairs Ministry in April 2024. In December 2024, after Darren Millar took control of the Welsh Conservatives, Evans was appointed Shadow Cabinet Secretary for Health and Social Care. In July 2025, his portfolio was expanded to include armed forces.

In August 2025, Evans publicly supported Brecon's first esports team, the S.E.A. Dragons, ahead of their debut in the Welsh Esports League.

Evans is a member of the Local Government and Housing Committee and the Wales COVID-19 Inquiry Special Purpose Committee. He is a member of cross-party groups on armed forces and cadets, beer and pubs, horse racing, preventing child sexual abuse, rural growth, small shops, suicide prevention and tourism.

In April 2025 he was selected to be a Conservative candidate in the Brycheiniog Tawe Nedd constituency in the upcoming 2026 Senedd election.

On 20 January 2026, Evans was expelled from the Conservative Party and was dismissed from his Shadow Cabinet role after it was alleged that he was planning to defect to Reform UK. He subsequently sat as an independent, until he joined Reform UK on 5 February during their rally at the ICC in Newport.

In the 2026 Senedd election, Evans was elected as a member for the Brycheiniog Tawe Nedd constituency, which replaced his former Brecon and Radnorshire constituency. On 19 May 2026, he was appointed as Reform's Shadow Minister for Health, Prevention and Sport. This was similar to his previous role in the Conservatives' shadow cabinet. Months later, in July 2026, he confirmed he would not seek re-election in the 2030 Senedd election.

== Political views ==
In 2023, Evans called for 'clear blue water' to be created between the Welsh Conservatives and the national Conservative Party, in reference to the clear red water approach taken by Welsh Labour.

In October 2024, Evans was a co-submitter and sole Welsh Conservative MS to vote in favour of a motion tabled by Julie Morgan supporting the principle of assisted suicide. He stated he had entered politics because he had promised his grandmother that he would "never let anybody go through what she went through at the end of her life."

== Notes ==
Senedd
Preceded by Kirsty Williams	Member of the Senedd for Brecon and Radnorshire; 2021 – 2026	Succeeded by Seat abolished
