= Natasha Asghar =

Welsh politician

Natasha Asghar MS
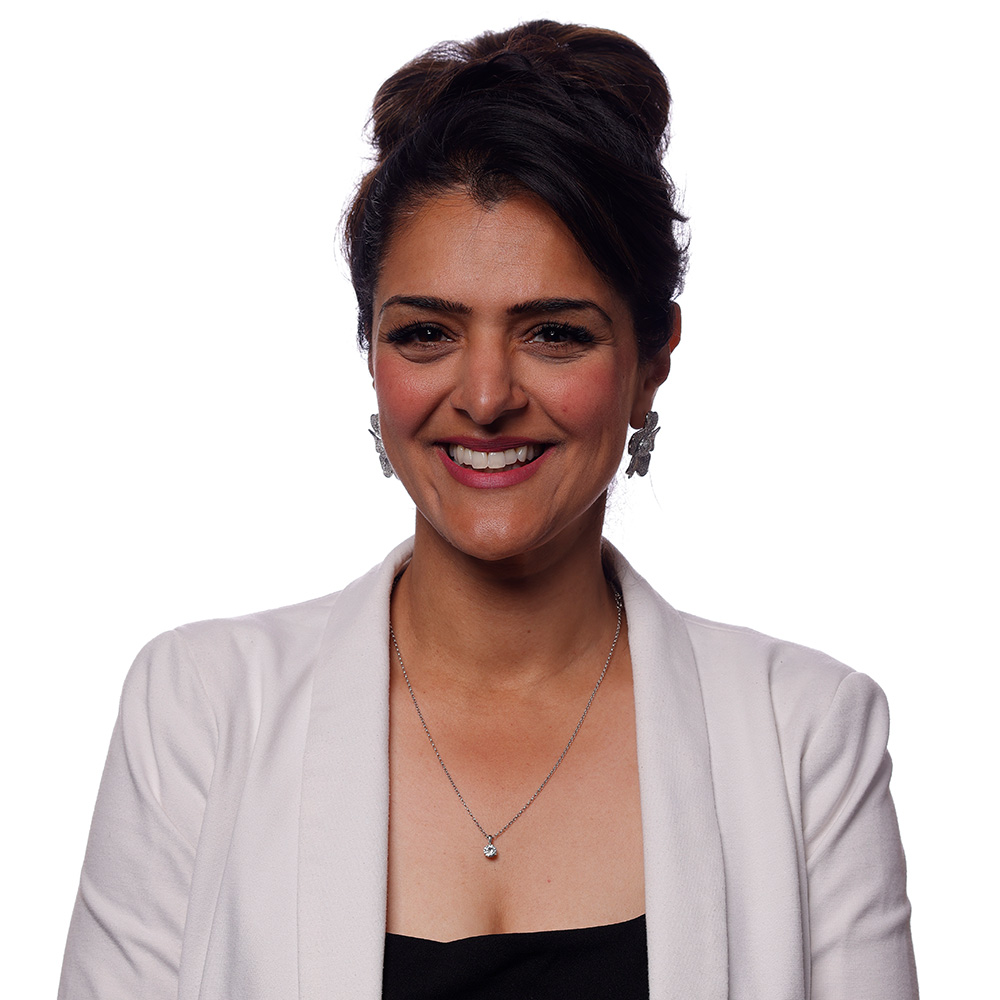
- Official portrait, 2026

Shadow Cabinet Secretary for Children, Young People and Education (Note: As just Shadow Cabinet Secretary for Education 12 December 2024 - 23 July 2025)
- In office 12 December 2024 – 20 January 2026
- Leader: Darren Millar
- Preceded by: Tom Giffard
- Succeeded by: Helen Jenner (Education); Sarah Cooper-Lesadd (Children and Young People)

Shadow Minister for Transport
- In office 27 May 2021 – 5 December 2024
- Leader: Andrew RT Davies
- Preceded by: Russell George
- Succeeded by: Peter Fox

Member of the Senedd for Casnewydd Islwyn
- Incumbent
- Assumed office 8 May 2026

Member of the Senedd for South Wales East
- In office 8 May 2021 – 7 April 2026

Personal details
- Born: Natasha Asghar; 20 October Newport, Wales
- Party: Welsh Conservatives
- Other political affiliations: Plaid Cymru (until 2009)
- Relatives: Mohammad Asghar (father)
- Education: Goldsmiths, University of London (BA); University of London (MA)
- Occupation: Politician; presenter; banker

Natasha Asghar is a Welsh Conservative Party politician who has served as Member of the Senedd for the Casnewydd Islwyn constituency since May 2026. She previously represented the South Wales East region from 2021 to 2026. She has held a number of Shadow Cabinet roles, including Shadow Cabinet Secretary for Education from December 2024 to January 2026. Her father Mohammad Asghar had represented the same region until his death in 2020. She is the first female ethnic-minority member of the Senedd.

== Early life ==
Asghar was born and raised in Newport. She is the daughter of the late Conservative assembly member Mohammad Asghar. Asghar was privately educated at Rougemont School in Llantarnam, she went on to hold a BA in politics and social policy and a master's in contemporary British policy and media from the University of London.

== Political career ==
Asghar stood as a Plaid Cymru candidate in the 2007 National Assembly for Wales election in Blaenau Gwent and on the Plaid list for the Wales constituency in the 2009 European elections.

She joined the Conservative Party in December 2009 at the same time as her father, Mohammad Asghar. She said "For me, family is everything. I believe in my father. Wherever he goes I will follow." At the time of Mohammad Asghar's defection, it was alleged that he left in part due to the party barring him from hiring her. She was hired as a member of his support staff in the Senedd in 2010.

She unsuccessfully contested Torfaen at the 2011 National Assembly for Wales election and Newport East at the 2015 and 2017 UK Parliament elections as a Conservative.

On 22 May 2023, Asghar announced that she would be standing for the Conservative Party's nomination for Mayor of London ahead of the 2024 London mayoral election. She announced her decision via a video on Twitter. She had previously been a London resident for 20 years before moving to Wales. On 12 June it was announced that her bid to become a potential candidate for the London mayoralty had failed when her name did not appear on the party's shortlist of three.

=== Senedd ===
She was elected to the Senedd at the 2021 Senedd election to represent South Wales East. She became the first female ethnic minority candidate to be elected as an MS. Shortly after she was appointed Shadow Minister for Transport. As Shadow Transport Minister, she supported the creation of an All Wales Travel Card similar to the Oyster card in London. She also led the Welsh Conservative's approach to criticising the reduction of 30 miles per hour speed limit zones to 20 mph.

In May 2024, the Senedd Standards Commissioner announced she was being investigated over her description of the Welsh Government's new 20 mph default limit policy as "blanket". In September 2024, the Commissioner reported that this was a breach of the Senedd's code of conduct. Asghar stated she would "make absolutely no apology" for her description of the policy. On 25 September, Asghar was formally reprimanded by the Senedd authorities for calling Wales' 20 mph speed limit a "blanket" policy on social media, while signing off a report advising her party to refrain from using the term. In October 2024, she posted images of herself attending a protest against the 20 mph policy on the steps of the Senedd, which involved heavy use of blankets, and allegedly strangled an effigy of Lee Waters, the Minister behind the policy. When asked if this was a protest against her censure, she said "I'm hoping now we're in winter, blankets will be a regular feature at these important gatherings."

After Andrew RT Davies resigned as Leader of the Welsh Conservatives and was replaced by Darren Millar, Asghar was reshuffled to the role of Shadow Cabinet Secretary for Education. Her portfolio was expanded to include responsibility for children and young people in July 2025.

In the 2026 Senedd election, Asghar was elected as the sixth and final candidate on the list in the Casnewydd Islwyn constituency, with the Welsh Conservatives receiving 11% of the vote.

== Recognition ==
In May 2021, Asghar was highlighted as one of British Vogue's "5 Forces For Change". She was named as one of the BBC's 100 Women in December 2021.

In 2024 Asghar was awarded the Devolved Politician of the Year Award at the House of Commons for her work in relation to the 20 mph campaign in Wales and in 2025 she was awarded the Iron Lady Award in the House of Lords for her contribution in politics.
