= First Andrew RT Davies shadow cabinet =

Shadow cabinet of Wales (2011–2016)

First RT Davies Shadow Cabinet
- Shadow Cabinet of Wales
- 2011–2016
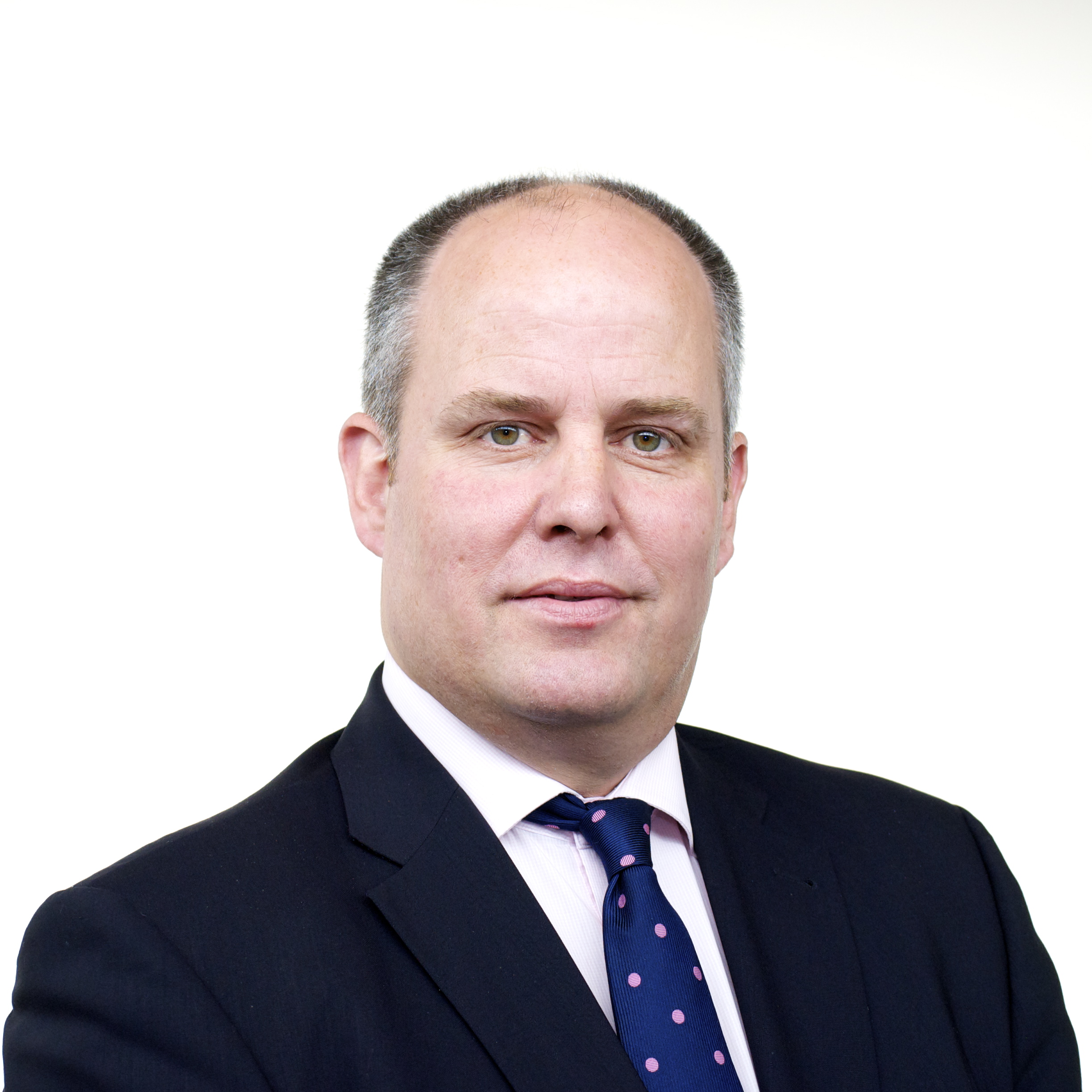
- Official portrait, 2011
- Date formed: 14 July 2011
- Date dissolved: 6 May 2016

People and organisations
- Monarch: Elizabeth II
- Leader of the Opposition and Shadow First Minister: Andrew RT Davies
- Member party: Welsh Conservative
- Status in legislature: Official Opposition

History
- Incoming formation: 2011 National Assembly for Wales election
- Outgoing formation: 2016 National Assembly for Wales election
- Legislature term: 4th National Assembly for Wales
- Predecessor: Shadow Cabinet of Nick Bourne; Interim Shadow Cabinet of Paul Davies (May-Jul 2011)
- Successor: Shadow Cabinet of Leanne Wood

Andrew RT Davies became Leader of the Opposition in July 2011, after he was elected leader of the Welsh Conservatives, which formed the second largest party bloc in the National Assembly for Wales (later Senedd) after the 2011 National Assembly for Wales election.

The Welsh Conservatives had previously formed the opposition under Nick Bourne from 2007-2011 while the third largest party, as the second largest party, Plaid Cymru, joined Welsh Labour in government. At the 2011 election, the Conservatives became the second largest overall party, gaining two seats, whilst Plaid Cymru lost 4. Bourne lost his seat at the 2011 Assembly election, prompting the 2011 Welsh Conservatives leadership election. Andrew RT Davies won this election, defeating Nick Ramsay with RT Davies receiving 53.1% of the vote. He took leadership of the party, and the role of Leader of the Opposition in July 2011. Paul Davies had served as interim leader for the two month period between the Assembly election and the choice of a leader.

Davies' Shadow Cabinet lasted until the 2016 National Assembly for Wales election, after which Plaid Cymru briefly became the second largest party, forming a Shadow Cabinet under Leanne Wood. However, after Dafydd Elis-Thomas left Plaid Cymru, and UKIP's Mark Reckless joined the Conservative group in the Assembly the Welsh Conservatives again became the largest Assembly Group, allowing Andrew RT Davies to form his Second Shadow Cabinet in 2017. He would later form two more Shadow Cabinets, the third from January to March 2021 and the fourth from 2021 to present.

== History ==
=== Initial Shadow Cabinet ===
RT Davies appointed his Shadow Cabinet on the 19th of July 2011. He appointed Paul Davies as Deputy Leader of the Welsh Conservatives and Shadow Finance Minister and Nick Ramsay as Shadow Business Minister. Janet Finch-Saunders also was appointed Shadow Minister for Local Government, and Mark Isherwood was made Shadow Minister for Social Justice and Housing, alongside a special responsibility for North Wales. Otherwise, his Shadow Cabinet was retained from Paul Davies' Interim Shadow Cabinet, with Darren Millar retaining his role as Shadow Minister for Health, Angela Burns remaining Shadow Minister for Education, Mohammad Asghar remaining Shadow Minister for Equalities and Shadow Minister for Sport, Byron Davies remained Shadow Minister for Transport, as well as being made a Whip, Suzy Davies remained Shadow Minister for Welsh Language & Culture, Russell George remained Shadow Environment Minister and William Graham remained as Business Manager for the Welsh Conservatives, as well as Chief Whip. Antoinette Sandbach was also remained Shadow Minister for Rural Affairs.

=== 2014 Reshuffle ===
In February 2014, Nick Ramsay, Antoinette Sandbach, Mohammad Asghar and Janet Finch-Saunders were all removed from the Shadow Cabinet, after they did not vote on a Senedd motion criticising the model of devolution of income tax powers proposed by the UK Conservative government. This model would have required any increase in income tax to be mirrored across all tax bands, preventing targeted increases or reductions. Their Shadow Ministries were reassigned, with Suzy Davies having responsibility for Equalities and Sport added to her Shadow Culture portfolio, William Graham being assigned the role of Shadow Minister for Business, Enterprise and Skills, Russell George taking the role of Shadow Minister for Agriculture and Natural Resources and Mark Isherwood becoming Shadow Minister for Housing, Communities, Local Government and North Wales.

This reshuffle was criticised by UK Conservative Party colleague David TC Davies saying "I'm very surprised because Nick [Ramsay] and the others were backing [UK Government] policy, backing the policy of David Jones which is if income tax is devolved after a referendum it needs to be done with certain restrictions in place."

=== Dissolution ===
At the 2016 National Assembly for Wales election, the Welsh Conservatives were reduced to 12 seats, to Plaid Cymru's 13, meaning Plaid leader Leanne Wood formed a new Shadow Cabinet.

== Members ==
=== July 2011–February 2014 ===
Portfolio	Shadow Minister	Constituency	Term
Leader of the Opposition; Leader of the Welsh Conservatives	Andrew RT Davies AM	South Wales Central	July 2011–May 2016
Shadow Minister for Finance; Deputy Leader of the Welsh Conservatives	Paul Davies AM	Preseli Pembrokeshire	July 2011–May 2016
Shadow Minister for Health	Darren Millar AM	Clwyd West	July 2011–May 2016
Shadow Minister for Education	Angela Burns AM	Carmarthen West and South Pembrokeshire	July 2011–May 2016
Shadow Minister for Business, Enterprise and Technology	Nick Ramsay AM	Monmouth	July 2011–February 2014
Chief Whip; Business Manager	William Graham AM	South Wales East	July 2011–February 2014
Shadow Minister for Transport; Party Whip	Byron Davies AM	South Wales West	July 2011–May 2016
Shadow Minister for Welsh Language and Culture	Suzy Davies AM	South Wales West	July 2011–February 2014
Shadow Minister for Environment	Russell George AM	Montgomeryshire	July 2011–February 2014
Shadow Minister for Social Justice and Housing; Special responsibility for North Wales	Mark Isherwood AM	North Wales	July 2011–February 2014
Shadow Minister for Rural Affairs	Antoinette Sandbach AM	North Wales	July 2011–February 2014
Shadow Minister for Equalities and Sport	Mohammad Asghar AM	South Wales East	July 2011–February 2014

=== February 2014-May 2016 ===
Portfolio	Shadow Minister	Constituency	Term
Leader of the Opposition; Leader of the Welsh Conservatives	Andrew RT Davies AM	South Wales Central	July 2011–May 2016
Shadow Minister for Finance; Deputy Leader of the Welsh Conservatives	Paul Davies (Conservative politician) AM	Preseli Pembrokeshire	July 2011–May 2016
Shadow Minister for Health	Darren Millar AM	Clwyd West	July 2011–May 2016
Shadow Minister for Education	Angela Burns AM	Carmarthen West and South Pembrokeshire	July 2011–May 2016
Shadow Minister for Business, Enterprise and Skills	William Graham AM	South Wales East	February 2014–May 2016
Shadow Minister for Transport; Party Whip	Byron Davies AM	South Wales West	July 2011–May 2016
Shadow Minister for Culture (including Equalities, Welsh Language, Heritage, and Sport)	Suzy Davies AM	South Wales West	February 2014–May 2016
Shadow Minister for Agriculture and Natural Resources	Russell George AM	Montgomeryshire	February 2014–May 2016
Shadow Minister for Housing, Communities and Local Government; Shadow Minister for North Wales	Mark Isherwood AM	North Wales	February 2014–May 2016
