= Paul Davies shadow cabinet =

2018–2021 opposition cabinet in Wales

Davies Shadow Cabinet
- Shadow Cabinet of Wales
- 2018–2021
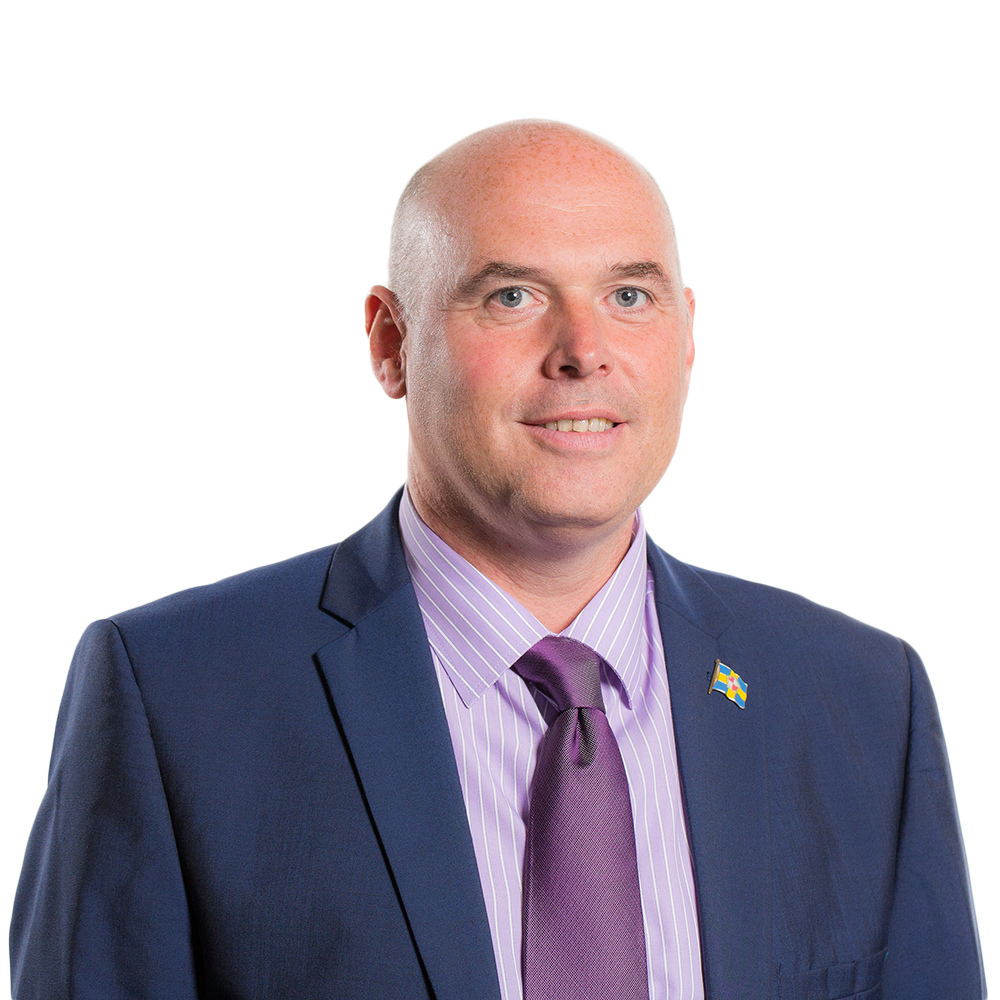
- Date formed: 18 September 2018
- Date dissolved: 23 January 2021

People and organisations
- Monarch: Elizabeth II
- Leader of the Opposition: Paul Davies
- Member party: Welsh Conservatives
- Status in legislature: Official Opposition

History
- Incoming formation: 2018 Welsh Conservatives leadership election
- Outgoing formation: 2021 Welsh Conservatives leadership election
- Legislature term: 5th National Assembly
- Predecessor: Second Shadow Cabinet of Andrew RT Davies
- Successor: Third Shadow Cabinet of Andrew RT Davies

Paul Davies became the Leader of the Opposition in Wales after the resignation of Andrew RT Davies on 27 June 2018 and named his Shadow Cabinet in September following his election as leader.

Between May 2016 and December 2018 the senior tier of ministers were referred to as Cabinet Secretaries and the junior tier as Ministers, from the formation of the first Drakeford government they reverted to their previous titles of Cabinet Ministers and Deputy Ministers respectively and the same applied to Conservative shadow ministers.

The Davies Shadow Cabinet was dissolved upon Paul Davies's resignation on 23 January 2021. The Third Shadow Cabinet of Andrew RT Davies was formed the next day.

== Background ==
Following the resignation of Andrew R. T. Davies in 2018, the Welsh Conservatives leadership election was contested. Nominations opened on 29 June 2018 and candidates needed a total of four nominations from Conservative AMs, including themselves, to stand. AMs Russell George, David Melding, and Darren Millar all declined to stand.

There were two candidates who reached the ballot: Deputy Leader and the then-Interim Leader Paul Davies, and former Shadow Minister for Tourism, Culture and the Welsh Language, Suzy Davies. The South Wales Argus described Paul Davies as having the support of "most of the big hitters in the party" including AMs Darren Millar and Nick Ramsay, former Secretary of State for Wales Stephen Crabb, and the then Chair of the Welsh Affairs Select Committee, David Davies. Voting opened on 15 August 2018 and in the outcome, Paul Davies obtained 68.1% of the votes of members. He then immediately became leader of the Opposition, becoming the leader of the second largest party in the Senedd.

Between April 2020 and July 2020 the Secretary of State for Wales, Simon Hart, and Monmouthshire County Council Leader Peter Fox, attended meetings of the Shadow Cabinet to support the response to the Coronavirus outbreak in Wales.

== History ==
=== Initial Appointments ===
On 18th of September 2018, after Davies was elected to lead the Welsh Conservatives, he appointed his shadow cabinet. He appointed Angela Burns in the role of Shadow Cabinet Secretary for Health, Suzy Davies in the role of Shadow Cabinet Secretary for Education and the Welsh Language, Nick Ramsay was appointed as Shadow Cabinet Secretary for Finance, Darren Millar as Chief Whip, Shadow Cabinet Secretary for External Affairs and Foreign Relations, and as policy director for the Welsh Conservatives. Russell George was appointed as Shadow Cabinet Secretary for Business, Economy and Infrastructure, as well as Shadow Minister for Mid Wales. Andrew RT Davies was appointed as Shadow Cabinet Secretary for Environment, Sustainability and Rural Affairs, David Melding as Shadow Cabinet Secretary for Housing, Heritage, Culture and Media, Mark Isherwood was appointed as Shadow Cabinet Secretary for Communities and Local Government as well as Shadow Minister for North Wales, Mohammad Asghar was appointed as Shadow Cabinet Secretary for Further Education, Skills and Faith, and Janet Finch-Saunders was appointed as Shadow Cabinet Secretary for Social Care, Children, Young People and Older People.

==== Changes ====
In December 2018, the roles were renamed from Shadow Cabinet Secretary and Shadow Minister to Shadow Minister and Shadow Deputy Minister.

On 16 June 2020, Mohammad Asghar died at age 74. Laura Anne Jones took his place as the third placed candidate on the Conservatives' party list.

=== July 2020 Reshuffle ===
On 17 July 2020, Davies reshuffled his Shadow Cabinet. He appointed Andrew RT Davies to the role of Shadow Minister for Health, Social Services & Sport. Laura Anne Jones was appointed to the role of Shadow Minister for Equalities, Children and Young people, Janet Finch-Saunders was appointed as Shadow Minister for Climate Change, Energy and Rural Affairs, and Angela Burns, previously Shadow Health Minister, was given responsibility for "government resilience and efficiency".

Nick Ramsay maintained his role as Shadow Finance Minister, as did Russell George as Shadow Minister for Business and Infrastructure, Mark Isherwood as Shadow Minister for Local Government, Housing and Communities, and Suzy Davies role as Shadow Minister for Education and the Welsh Language was expanded to include skills.

==== Changes ====
In September 2020 David Melding, a moderate and pro-devolution Tory quit his role in the shadow cabinet, Shadow Counsel General & Shadow Minister for Culture & Communications. He made his decision of leaving the front bench permanently after "misgivings for some time" over the party's approach to Brexit, citing his belief that it will lead to the union breaking up. He quit his job the same day as the UK Government introduced in Parliament the Internal Market Bill.

=== Dissolution ===
On 19 January 2021, incidents of Paul Davies drinking with other politicians on the Senedd estate in December 2020 were widely reported. It was believed at the time that this could be a breach of Welsh COVID-19 regulations. He apologised on that day, and received the support of the Shadow Cabinet. On 23 January 2021, Davies stood down as Leader of the Welsh Conservatives. Andrew RT Davies was unanimously re-appointed as leader of the Welsh Conservatives, and formed a new Shadow Cabinet the next day.

== Leadership election ==
2018 Welsh Conservatives leadership election
29 June 2018 - 6 September 2018
Candidate	Votes
Paul Davies	68.1 / 100
Suzy Davies	31.9 / 100
Source: BBC

== Members ==
=== September 2018 - July 2020 ===
Conservative Shadow Cabinet (as of December 2020)
Portfolio	Name	Constituency	Term
Leader of the Opposition Leader of the Conservative Party in the Senedd	Paul Davies MS	Preseli Pembrokeshire	September 2018 – January 2021
Chief Whip and Shadow Minister for External Affairs & International Relations	Darren Millar MS	Clwyd West	September 2018 – January 2021
Shadow Minister for Health	Angela Burns MS	Carmarthen West and South Pembrokeshire	September 2018 - July 2020
Shadow Minister for Finance	Nick Ramsay MS	Monmouth	September 2018 – January 2021 (Note: Ramsay was briefly suspended from the Conservative party, and while suspended lost his role)
Shadow Minister for Education and the Welsh Language	Suzy Davies MS	South Wales West	September 2018 – January 2021
Shadow Minister for Business, Economy and Infrastructure, and Mid Wales	Russell George MS	Montgomeryshire	September 2018 – January 2021
Shadow Minister for Further Education, Skills and Faith	Mohammad Asghar MS	South Wales East	September 2018 - June 2020
Shadow Minister for Social Care, Children, Young People, and Older People	Janet Finch-Saunders MS	Aberconwy	September 2018 - July 2020
Shadow Minister for Environment, Sustainability, and Rural Affairs	Andrew R. T. Davies MS	South Wales Central	September 2018 - July 2020
Shadow Minister for Local Government, Housing & Communities, Armed Forces and North Wales	Mark Isherwood MS	North Wales	September 2018 – January 2021
Shadow Minister for Housing, Heritage, Culture and Media	David Melding	Monmouth	September 2018 - July 2020

==== Changes ====
On 16 June 2020, Mohammad Asghar died at age 74. Laura Anne Jones took his place as the third placed candidate on the Conservatives' party list.

=== July 2020 - January 2021 ===
Conservative Shadow Cabinet (as of December 2020)
Portfolio	Name	Constituency	Term
Leader of the Opposition Leader of the Conservative Party in the Senedd	Paul Davies MS	Preseli Pembrokeshire	September 2018 – January 2021
Chief Whip and Shadow Minister for External Affairs & International Relations	Darren Millar MS	Clwyd West	September 2018 – January 2021
Shadow Minister for Government Resilience & Efficiency	Angela Burns MS	Carmarthen West and South Pembrokeshire	July 2020 - January 2021
Shadow Minister for Finance	Nick Ramsay MS	Monmouth	September 2018 – January 2021 (Note: Ramsay was briefly suspended from the Conservative party, and while suspended lost his role)
Shadow Minister for Education, Skills and Welsh Language	Suzy Davies MS	South Wales West	September 2018 – January 2021
Shadow Minister for Business, Economy and Infrastructure, and Mid Wales	Russell George MS	Montgomeryshire	September 2018 – January 2021
Shadow Minister for Equalities, Children and Young People	Laura Anne Jones MS	South Wales East	July 2020 - January 2021
Shadow Minister for Climate Change, Energy & Rural Affairs	Janet Finch-Saunders MS	Aberconwy	July 2020 - January 2021
Shadow Minister for Health, Social Services & Sport	Andrew R. T. Davies MS	South Wales Central	July 2020 - January 2021
Shadow Minister for Local Government, Housing & Communities, Armed Forces and North Wales	Mark Isherwood MS	North Wales	September 2018 – January 2021
Shadow Counsel General & Shadow Minister for Culture & Communications	David Melding	Monmouth	July 2020 - September 2020

==== Changes ====
In September 2020, David Melding stood down from the Shadow Cabinet. He made his decision of leaving the front bench permanently after "misgivings for some time" over the party's approach to Brexit, citing his belief that it will lead to the union breaking up. He quit his job the same day as the UK Government introduced in Parliament the Internal Market Bill.

== See also ==
- Drakeford government
- Members of the 5th Senedd
