= Second Andrew RT Davies shadow cabinet =

Shadow cabinet of Wales (2017–2018)

Second RT Davies Shadow Cabinet
- Shadow Cabinet of Wales
- 2017–2018
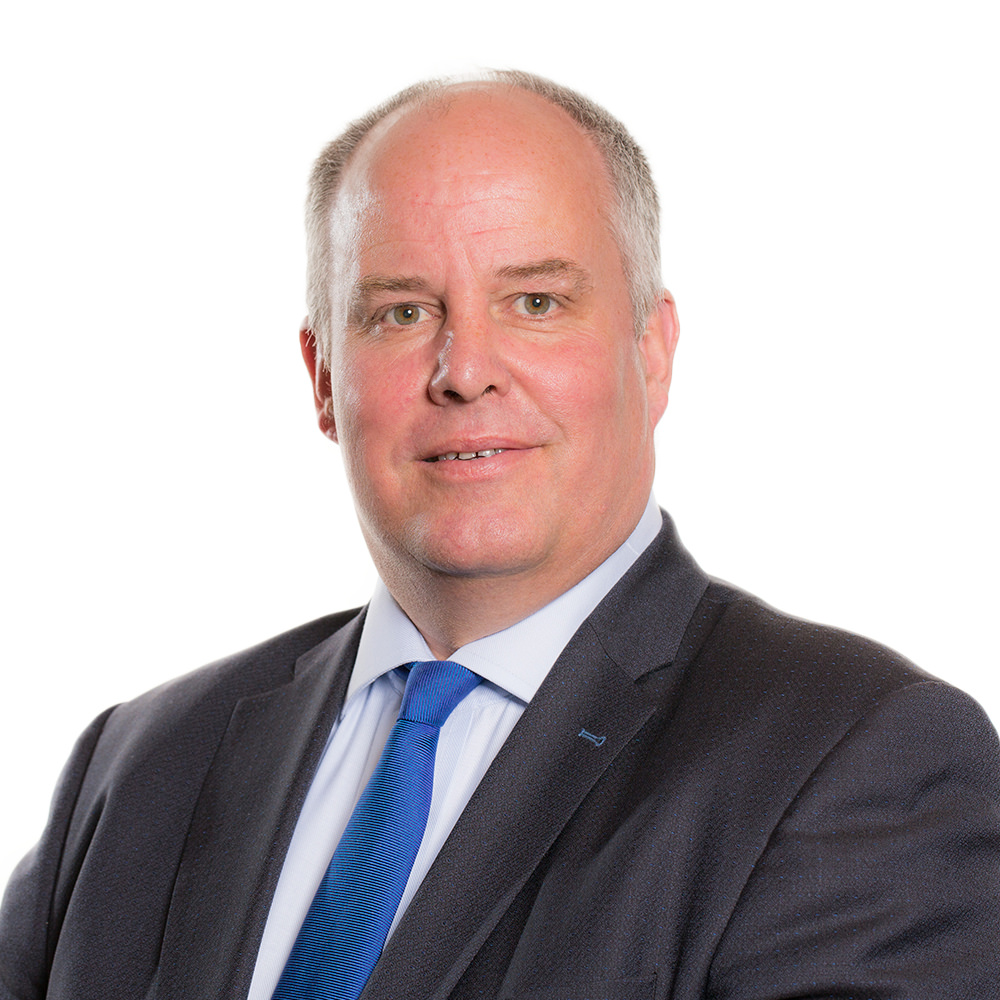
- RT Davies' Assembly photo, 2016
- Date formed: 6 April 2017
- Date dissolved: 27 June 2018

People and organisations
- Monarch: Elizabeth II
- Leader of the Opposition and Shadow First Minister: Andrew RT Davies
- Member party: Welsh Conservative
- Status in legislature: Official Opposition

History
- Incoming formation: Mark Reckless (Note: Reckless joining the Conservative Group in the Senedd caused Welsh Conservatives to gain official opposition status)
- Outgoing formation: 2018 Welsh Conservatives leadership election
- Legislature term: 5th National Assembly for Wales
- Predecessor: Shadow Cabinet of Leanne Wood
- Successor: Shadow Cabinet of Paul Davies

Andrew RT Davies became Leader of the Opposition in the Senedd on 6 April 2017, after he invited Mark Reckless to join the Welsh Conservative Senedd group, making the Welsh Conservative group the second largest group in the Senedd.

After the May 2016 Welsh Assembly election, Plaid Cymru were the second largest party, with 12 members to the Welsh Conservatives' 11. As such, they formed a Shadow Cabinet under Leanne Wood. In October 2016, Dafydd Elis-Thomas left Plaid Cymru, tying the two parties on 11 members. Between October 2016 and April 2017, there was no Official Opposition. In April 2017, Mark Reckless, formerly of UKIP, joined the Welsh Conservative group in the Senedd, increasing that group from 11 to 12.

Reckless was not permitted to rejoin the Conservative Party. Regardless, the decision to allow Reckless to join the Conservative Senedd group was thoroughly criticised, with Gower MP Byron Davies describing it as "not a particularly bright idea."

In June 2018, RT Davies resigned as leader of the Welsh Conservatives after losing the confidence of the Welsh Conservative Senedd group. The 2018 Welsh Conservatives leadership election was held to replace him, and won by his deputy, Paul Davies, who then formed his own Shadow Cabinet.

== Members ==
Portfolios were carried over from Spokesperson appointments made shortly after the 2016 Assembly election, but with those roles becoming Shadow Ministries.

Conservative Shadow Cabinet (as of December 2020)
Portfolio	Name	Constituency	Term
Leader of the Opposition Leader of the Conservative Party in the Senedd	Andrew R. T. Davies MS	South Wales Central	April 2017 – June 2018
Shadow Minister for Rural Affairs; Deputy leader of the Welsh Conservatives; Chief Whip	Paul Davies MS	Preseli Pembrokeshire	April 2017 – June 2018
Shadow Minister for Education	Darren Millar MS	Clwyd West	April 2017 – June 2018
Shadow Minister for Health	Angela Burns MS	Carmarthen West and South Pembrokeshire	April 2017 – June 2018
Shadow Minister for Finance	Nick Ramsay MS	Monmouth	April 2017 – June 2018
Shadow Minister for Social Services and Older People and the Welsh Language	Suzy Davies MS	South Wales West	April 2017 – June 2018
Shadow Minister for the Economy, Transport and Sport	Russell George MS	Montgomeryshire	April 2017 – June 2018
Shadow Minister for Skills	Mohammad Asghar MS	South Wales East	April 2017 – June 2018
Shadow Minister for Local Government; Vice Chair of the Welsh Conservative Group	Janet Finch-Saunders MS	Aberconwy	April 2017 – June 2018
Shadow Minister for Communities and Europe	Mark Isherwood MS	North Wales	April 2017 – June 2018
Shadow Minister for Environment, Sustainability, Planning and Housing; Chairman of the Welsh Conservative group	David Melding	Monmouth	April 2017 – June 2018
