= 2011 Welsh Conservatives leadership election =

- 10 May 2011 – 14 July 2011
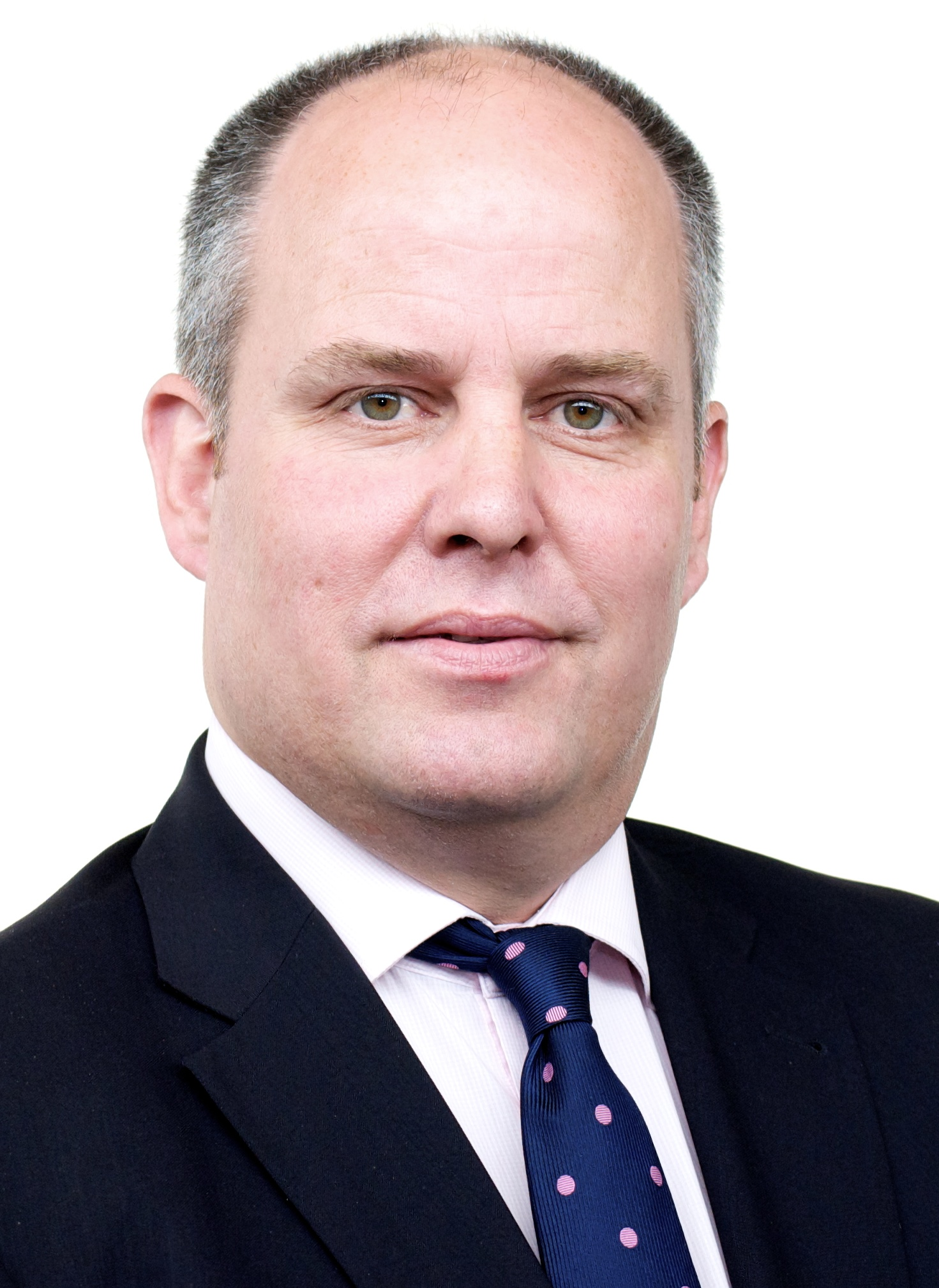

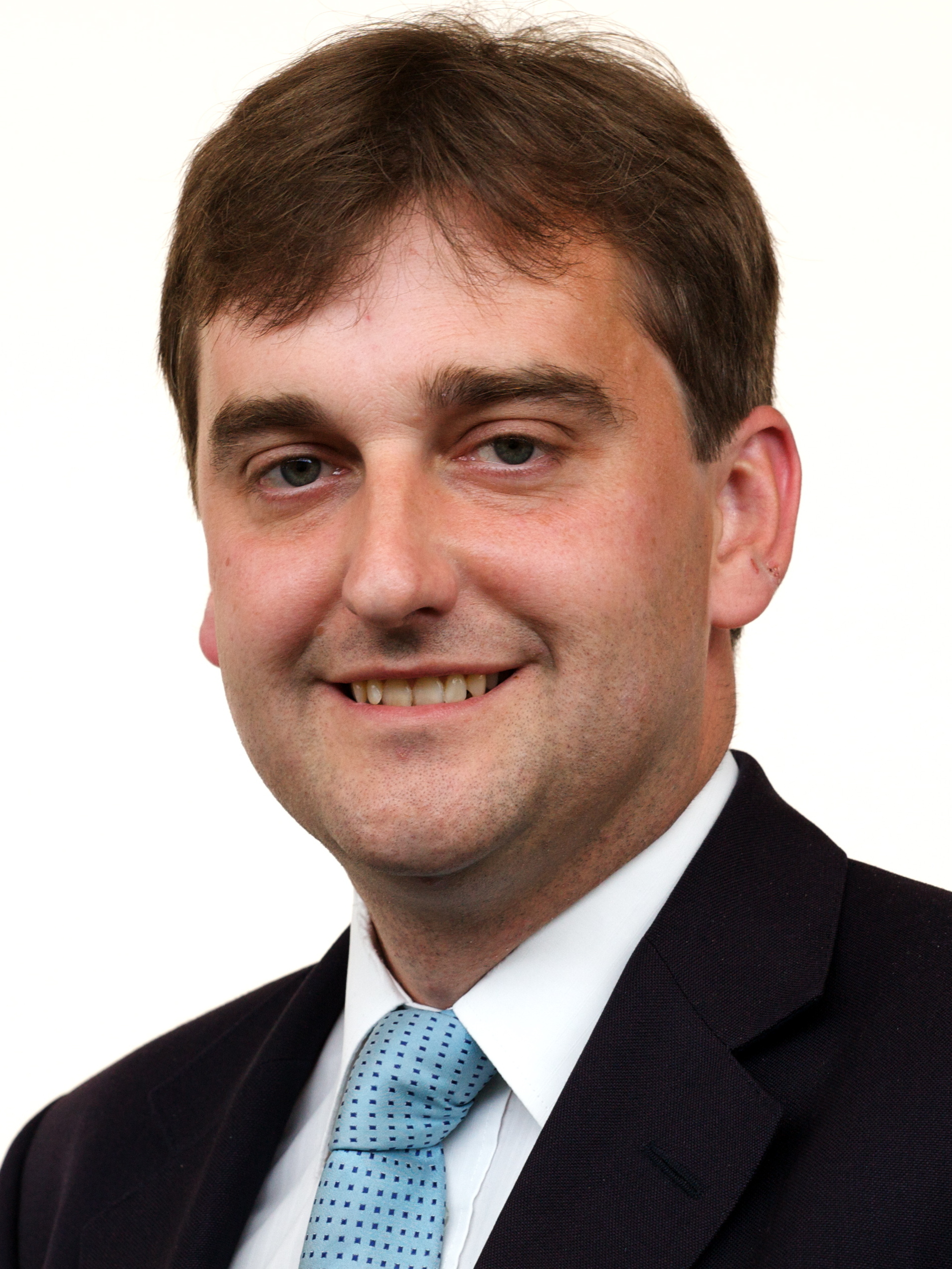
Candidate	Andrew RT Davies	Nick Ramsay
Percentage	53.1%	46.7%
Leader before election
Paul Davies (acting)
Nick Bourne
Elected Leader
Andrew RT Davies

The 2011 Welsh Conservatives leadership election was held on 14 July 2011. Andrew RT Davies defeated Nick Ramsay, the only other candidate.

Following the 2011 Assembly election the party's leader Nick Bourne lost his Mid and West Wales seat. Paul Davies then became the interim leader whilst an election took place. The contest then consisted of Andrew RT Davies (South Wales Central) against Ramsay (Monmouth). Andrew RT Davies won with some 53.1 per cent of the vote on a 49 per cent turnout of the party's Welsh membership.

== Candidates ==
Candidate	Born	Home county	Seat	Endorsements
Andrew Davies	1968 Cowbridge, Vale of Glamorgan	Vale of Glamorgan	South Wales Central (2007-)	William Graham, Byron Davies and Darren Millar.
Nick Ramsay	10 June 1975 Cwmbran, Torfaen	Torfaen	Monmouth (2007-)	Mark Isherwood, Mohammad Asghar and Suzy Davies.

== Result ==
Candidate	%
Turnout: 49%
Andrew RT Davies	53.1
Nick Ramsay	46.7
Spoilt	0.2
Total	100.0

The conservative Party did not release the raw vote figures only the percentages won.

Andrew RT Davies was declared the result and thus became the Leader of the Opposition in the National Assembly for Wales.
