= Leader of the Opposition (Wales) =

Parliamentary position in Wales

- Arweinydd yr Wrthblaid (Welsh)
- Incumbent; Helen Jenner since 15 September 2026
- Style: Member of the Senedd (MS)
- Term length: While leader of the largest political party in the Senedd that is not in government
- Inaugural holder: Dafydd Wigley
- Formation: May 1999
- Salary: £104,709 for 2024/25 tax year

In the Senedd, the Leader of the Opposition (Welsh: Arweinydd yr Wrthblaid) is the leader of the Official Opposition (Welsh: Yr Wrthblaid Swyddogol), the largest political party that is not in the Welsh Government. Currently, this office is held by Helen Jenner following the resignation of Dan Thomas as leader of Reform UK Wales on 15 September 2026. The Leader of the Opposition leads and appoints members of the Shadow Cabinet.

From 5 December 2024 to 20 January 2026 the Leader of the Opposition in the Senedd was Darren Millar, from the Welsh Conservatives. To date the office has been held by eight individuals from 1997, beginning with Dafydd Wigley. Three have been from Plaid Cymru and four from the Welsh Conservatives. Only one, Ieuan Wyn Jones, has gone on to serve in the Welsh Government.

== Role ==
Like in the Westminster system of the UK Parliament, the Welsh Senedd has an official opposition which, by convention, serves to scrutinise the government of the day and acts as an alternative government-in-waiting. The Official Opposition is formed from the largest political party in the Senedd which does not serve in the Welsh Government. This is generally the second largest party in the Senedd, however smaller parties may also fulfill the role when there is a coalition between the largest parties. The Leader of the Opposition leads the Official Opposition and appoints its members to the Welsh Shadow Cabinet, whose portfolios mirror those of ministers or cabinet secretaries (Note: In the Welsh Government, senior ministers are currently known as cabinet secretaries, having previously held that title from 2016 to 2018, while junior ministers are simply known as ministers, also previously holding that title from 2016 to 2018. From 2000 to 2016 and 2018 to 2024, senior ministers were known as ministers and junior ministers were known as deputy ministers. Before 2000, senior ministers were known as assembly secretaries.) in the Welsh Government. Members of the Shadow Cabinet lead the Official Opposition in challenging government ministers and holding them to account. (Note: Other opposition parties appoint frontbench teams sometimes known as shadow cabinets whose members perform a similar role, but these have no official recognition unlike the Shadow Cabinet.)

As with some other practices in the Senedd, the roles of Official Opposition and Leader of the Opposition have no legal basis, instead they have developed as conventions in the Senedd. Both concepts were introduced on an informal basis with the establishment of the Senedd as the National Assembly for Wales in 1999, with the inaugural holder being Dafydd Wigley of Plaid Cymru, the Official Opposition in the assembly at the time. Official recognition was granted in October 2000 with the formation of Rhodri Morgan's coalition government between Welsh Labour and the Welsh Liberal Democrats, with Wigley's successor Ieuan Wyn Jones formally being granted the title of Leader of the Opposition as the assembly began to adopt some elements of the style of government as seen in Westminster. The official introduction of the role also signalled a move toward increased precedence for the Official Opposition in plenary sessions of the assembly and on its subject committees, leading to further scrutiny of the government.

The Leader of the Opposition is officially recognised by the Llywydd of the Senedd and on the website of the Senedd as uniquely serving in that position. Sometimes, the Leader of the Opposition is also styled as the Shadow First Minister of Wales, (Note: Before October 2000, this office was titled Shadow First Secretary of Wales.) which is a role they can hold as leader of the Shadow Cabinet; this title has been held by Dafydd Wigley and Ieuan Wyn Jones of Plaid Cymru and Nick Bourne of the Welsh Conservatives.

=== Salary ===
In 2001, the National Assembly for Wales decided to grant the Leader of the Opposition a dedicated salary, equivalent to that of a minister in the Welsh Government, of around £34,000. By the end of the third legislative term of the National Assembly in 2011, the salary of the Leader of the Opposition was £41,949.

Going into the fourth term of the assembly in 2011, the Independent Remuneration Board of the assembly replaced the dedicated salary of the Leader of the Opposition with a general salary for all opposition party leaders in the assembly, with a minimum salary of £12,420 which was increased by £1,000 for each seat held by their party. As such, the salary of the Leader of the Opposition, with 14 AMs in their party at the time, was reduced to £26,420 from July 2011 and frozen for a period of four years. In April 2023, Leader of the Opposition Andrew RT Davies's salary as leader of the Conservative opposition group in the Senedd was set at £101,656. In March 2024, Davies's salary was increased to £104,709 for the 2024/25 tax year.

== History ==
Between July 2007 and May 2011, Nick Bourne served as Leader of the Opposition, even though the Conservatives were the third largest group in the Assembly. This was a result of the Welsh Government's make-up consisting of Labour and Plaid Cymru, which were the largest and second largest groups respectively.

Following the 2016 election, Plaid Cymru (led by Leanne Wood) became the largest group not in government, having won 12 seats to the Welsh Conservatives' 11. On 14 October 2016 Dafydd Elis-Thomas left Plaid Cymru to sit as an independent, which resulted in Plaid Cymru and the Welsh Conservatives both holding 11 seats. During this period Leanne Wood was not referred to as Leader of the Opposition but was instead referred to as the leader of Plaid Cymru. The Conservative group grew to 12 following Mark Reckless's defection from UKIP to the Conservative Group on 6 April 2017, and Andrew RT Davies was once again referred to as Leader of the Opposition.

On 29 March 2021 Nick Ramsay left the Welsh Conservative party, meaning that the group had lost its title as the largest party not in government as by this point both the Welsh Conservatives and Plaid Cymru were tied on 10 seats each, with no official office holder of the Leader of the opposition in the final period before the 2021 Senedd election.

Following the 2021 Senedd election the Welsh Conservatives returned 16 seats making them comfortably the second party ahead of Plaid Cymru who won 13 and as a result Andrew RT Davies once again became Leader of the Opposition. On 3 December 2024, Andrew RT Davies resigned, after a period of prolonged controversy over his public comments and conduct. He left the role on 5 December 2024, after the Senedd Conservative group selected Darren Millar to replace him. In January 2026, James Evans defected from the Welsh Conservatives to Reform UK Wales. Due to other losses of members throughout the term, this placed the Welsh Conservatives and Plaid Cymru tied, meaning the position remained vacant until the Senedd was dissolved for the election.

== List of leaders of the opposition in the Senedd ==
Portrait	Leader of the Opposition	Term of office		Elections	Shadow cabinet	Constituency/Region	Government
Portrait	Leader of the Opposition	Start	End	Elections	Shadow cabinet	Constituency/Region	Government
	Dafydd Wigley	12 May 1999	16 March 2000	1999	Shadow Cabinet of Dafydd Wigley	Caernarfon	Michael administration
	Dafydd Wigley	12 May 1999	16 March 2000	1999	Shadow Cabinet of Dafydd Wigley	Caernarfon	Interim Rhodri Morgan administration
	Dafydd Wigley	10 months and 4 days		1999	Shadow Cabinet of Dafydd Wigley	Caernarfon	First Rhodri Morgan government
	Ieuan Wyn Jones	16 March 2000	11 July 2007	2003	Shadow Cabinet of Ieuan Wyn Jones	Ynys Môn	Second Rhodri Morgan government
	Ieuan Wyn Jones	7 years, 3 months and 25 days		2003	Shadow Cabinet of Ieuan Wyn Jones	Ynys Môn	Second Rhodri Morgan government
	Ieuan Wyn Jones	7 years, 3 months and 25 days		2007	Shadow Cabinet of Ieuan Wyn Jones	Ynys Môn	Third Rhodri Morgan government
	Nick Bourne	11 July 2007	6 May 2011	—	Shadow Cabinet of Nick Bourne	Mid and West Wales	Third Rhodri Morgan government
	Nick Bourne	11 July 2007	6 May 2011	—	Shadow Cabinet of Nick Bourne	Mid and West Wales	Fourth Rhodri Morgan government
	Nick Bourne	3 years, 9 months and 25 days		—	Shadow Cabinet of Nick Bourne	Mid and West Wales	First Jones government
	Paul Davies	6 May 2011	14 July 2011	2011	Interim Shadow Cabinet of Paul Davies	Preseli Pembrokeshire	Second Jones government
	Paul Davies	2 months and 8 days		2011	Interim Shadow Cabinet of Paul Davies	Preseli Pembrokeshire	Second Jones government
	Andrew RT Davies	14 July 2011	6 May 2016	—	First Shadow Cabinet of Andrew RT Davies	South Wales Central	Second Jones government
	Andrew RT Davies	4 years, 9 months and 22 days		—	First Shadow Cabinet of Andrew RT Davies	South Wales Central	Second Jones government
	Leanne Wood	6 May 2016	14 October 2016	2016	Shadow Cabinet of Leanne Wood	Rhondda	Third Jones government
	Leanne Wood	5 months and 8 days		2016	Shadow Cabinet of Leanne Wood	Rhondda	Third Jones government
Not in use 14 Oct 2016 – 6 April 2017; During this period, both Plaid Cymru and the Welsh Conservatives were tied on 11 seats each. This was after Lord Elis-Thomas left Plaid Cymru to sit as an independent. Leanne Wood was not referred to as Leader of the Opposition during this period and was instead referred to as the leader of Plaid Cymru. The Conservative group grew to 12 following Mark Reckless's defection from the UK Independence Party to the Conservatives on 6 April, and Andrew RT Davies was referred to as Leader of the Opposition once more.							Third Jones government
	Andrew RT Davies	6 April 2017	27 June 2018	—	Second Shadow Cabinet of Andrew RT Davies	South Wales Central	Third Jones government
	Andrew RT Davies	6 April 2017	27 June 2018	—	Second Shadow Cabinet of Andrew RT Davies	South Wales Central	First Drakeford government
	Andrew RT Davies	1 year, 2 months and 21 days		—	Second Shadow Cabinet of Andrew RT Davies	South Wales Central	First Drakeford government
	Paul Davies	27 June 2018	23 January 2021	—	Shadow Cabinet of Paul Davies	Preseli Pembrokeshire	First Drakeford government
	Paul Davies	2 years, 6 months and 27 days		—	Shadow Cabinet of Paul Davies	Preseli Pembrokeshire	First Drakeford government
	Andrew RT Davies	24 January 2021	29 March 2021	—	Third Shadow Cabinet of Andrew RT Davies	South Wales Central	First Drakeford government
	Andrew RT Davies	2 months and 6 days		—	Third Shadow Cabinet of Andrew RT Davies	South Wales Central	First Drakeford government
Not in use 29 March – 7 May 2021; During the final period before the 2021 Senedd election, both the Welsh Conservatives and Plaid Cymru were tied on 10 seats each. This happened after Nick Ramsay left the Welsh Conservatives and group in the Senedd to stand as an independent in the Senedd election.							First Drakeford government
	Andrew RT Davies	7 May 2021	5 December 2024	2021	Fourth Shadow Cabinet of Andrew RT Davies	South Wales Central	Second Drakeford government
	Andrew RT Davies	7 May 2021	5 December 2024	2021	Fourth Shadow Cabinet of Andrew RT Davies	South Wales Central	Gething government
	Andrew RT Davies	3 years, 6 months and 28 days		2021	Fourth Shadow Cabinet of Andrew RT Davies	South Wales Central	Eluned Morgan government
	Darren Millar	5 December 2024	20 January 2026	—	Shadow Cabinet of Darren Millar	Clwyd West	Eluned Morgan government
	Darren Millar	1 year, 1 month and 19 days		—	Shadow Cabinet of Darren Millar	Clwyd West	Eluned Morgan government
Not in use 20 January – 8 May 2026; During the final period before the 2026 Senedd election, both the Welsh Conservatives and Plaid Cymru were tied on 13 seats each. This happened after James Evans was expelled from the Welsh Conservatives and group in the Senedd to sit as an independent MS in the Senedd.							Eluned Morgan government
	Dan Thomas	12 May 2026	15 September 2026	2026	Shadow Cabinet of Dan Thomas	Casnewydd Islwyn	ap Iorwerth government
	Dan Thomas	4 months and 7 days		2026	Shadow Cabinet of Dan Thomas	Casnewydd Islwyn	ap Iorwerth government
	Helen Jenner	15 September 2026	Incumbent	—	Shadow Cabinet of Helen Jenner	Bangor Conwy Môn	ap Iorwerth government
	Helen Jenner	2 months and 1 day		—	Shadow Cabinet of Helen Jenner	Bangor Conwy Môn	ap Iorwerth government

== See also ==
- First Minister of Wales
- Deputy First Minister for Wales
- Welsh Government
