= Russell George (Welsh politician) =

Welsh Conservative Party politician

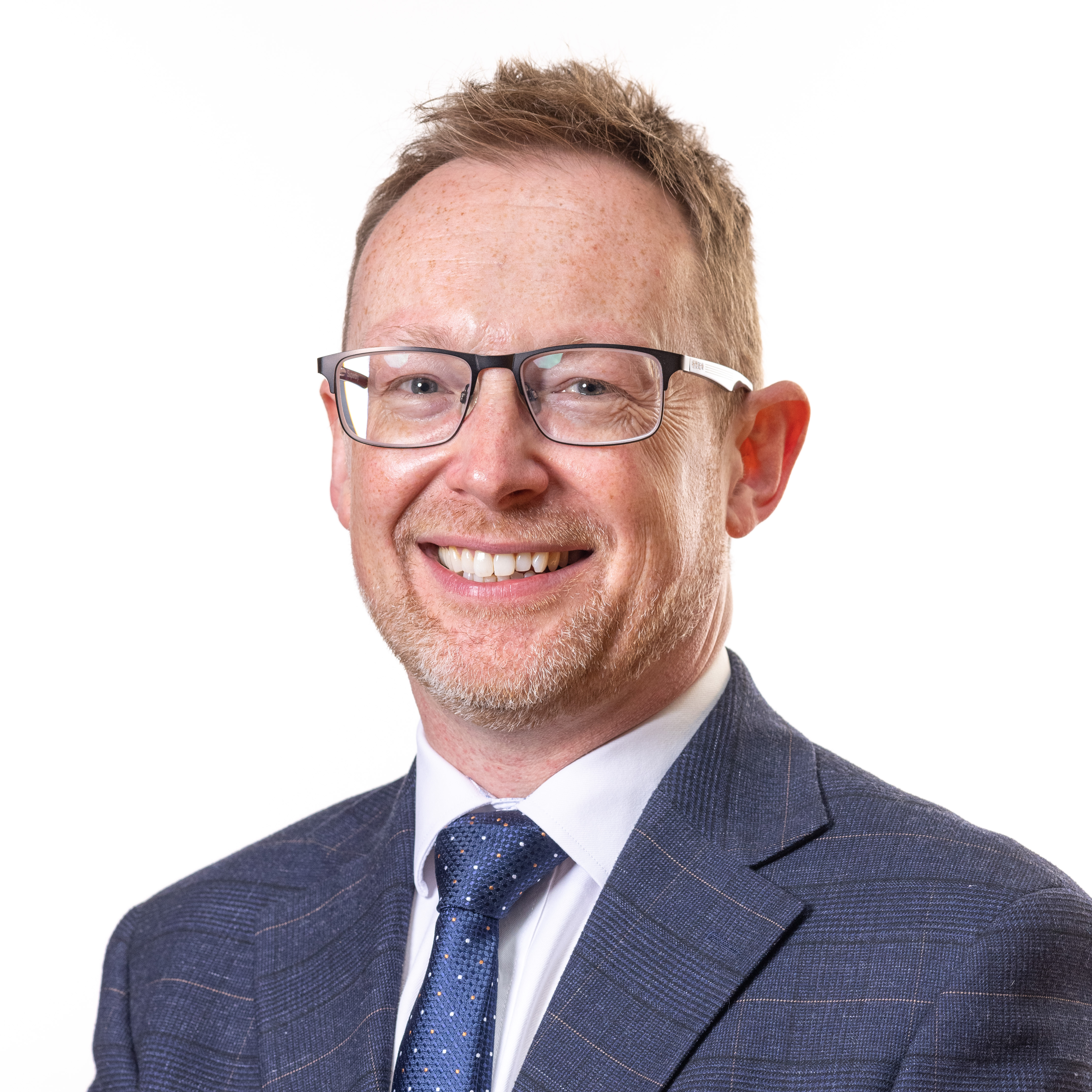
- George in 2021

Shadow Minister for Mid Wales
- In office 18 April 2024 – 25 June 2024
- Leader: Andrew RT Davies
- Preceded by: James Evans
- In office 18 September 2018 – 29 March 2021
- Leader: Paul Davies; Andrew RT Davies
- Succeeded by: James Evans

Shadow Minister for Health
- In office 27 May 2021 – 18 April 2024
- Leader: Andrew RT Davies
- Preceded by: Angela Burns
- Succeeded by: Sam Rowlands

Shadow Minister for Economy and Infrastructure (Note: Economy, Transport and Sport (2017-2018) Business, Economy and Infrastructure (2018-2021) Economy and Transport (Jan-Mar 2021))
- In office 6 April 2017 – 29 March 2021
- Leader: Andrew RT Davies 2017-2018; Paul Davies; Andrew RT Davies 2021
- Preceded by: Adam Price 2016
- Succeeded by: Peter Fox Finance; Natasha Asghar Transport

Shadow Minister for Agriculture and Natural Resources
- In office 13 February 2014 – 5 May 2016
- Leader: Andrew RT Davies
- Preceded by: Antoinette Sandbach
- Succeeded by: Role not in Use

Shadow Minister for Environment and Sustainable Development
- In office 17 May 2011 – 5 May 2016
- Leader: Paul Davies Interim; Andrew RT Davies
- Preceded by: Angela Burns
- Succeeded by: Role not in Use

Member of the Senedd for Montgomeryshire
- In office 6 May 2011 – 7 April 2026
- Preceded by: Mick Bates
- Succeeded by: Constituency abolished

Powys County Councillor for Newtown Central
- In office May 2008 – May 2017

Personal details
- Born: 27 April 1974 (age 52) Welshpool, Wales
- Party: Independent (From April 2025)
- Other political affiliations: Welsh Conservative (Suspended since April 2025)
- Education: Birmingham City University
- Website: www.russellgeorge.com

Russell Ian George (born 27 April 1974) is a Welsh politician who was the Member of the Senedd (MS) for Montgomeryshire from the 2011 election until 2026. He originally sat as a member of the Welsh Conservative Party but sat as an independent after being suspended from the Conservative party in April 2025 pending trial for gambling offences.

== Background ==
Russell was born in Welshpool and brought up in Montgomeryshire. He attended Birmingham City University, achieving a BA in Information and Media Studies, and has lived in Montgomeryshire all his life. He owns an online gifts, media business in Newtown called Fuze.

== Political career ==
=== Powys County Council ===
In 2008 Russell was elected to Powys County Council to represent the Newtown Central ward. Following this, he was elected by the County Councils’ Welsh Conservative group to be one of its representatives on the council's executive management board a position he held until 2011. He stood down as a Councillor in 2017.

=== Senedd ===
Russell was elected to represent Montgomeryshire in the National Assembly for Wales (later Senedd) at the 2011 National Assembly for Wales election. He was elected with a majority of 2,324 votes. He was subsequently re-elected at the 2016 and 2021 elections, with increased majorities.

Following his election in 2011, Russell was appointed as the Shadow Minister for Environment and Sustainable Development by interim leader of the Welsh Conservatives Paul Davies, a role which he retained when Andrew RT Davies took leadership shortly after. In 2014 he was assigned the Agriculture and Natural Resources portfolio.

After the 2016 Senedd elections he was appointed Welsh Conservative spokesperson for Economy, transport and sport, and he also chaired the Assembly's Economy, Infrastructure and Skills Committee. This spokesperson role became a Shadow Ministry in 2017, when the Welsh Conservatives became the largest party, after Mark Reckless rejoined. In 2018, after Paul Davies took over the Welsh Conservative party he was again moved, this time to the Shadow Cabinet Secretary for Business, Economy, and Infrastructure, as well as the Shadow Minister for Mid Wales. He maintained this role until Davies stood down in 2021, after possible violations of Welsh COVID restrictions, at which point Andrew RT Davies returned as leader of the Welsh Conservatives, and reshuffled George back to the Shadow Economy and Transport brief, while maintaining the Mid Wales brief. This role ceased to be a shadow cabinet role in March 2021, after Nick Ramsay left the Welsh Conservatives, tying the Welsh Tories and Plaid Cymru for seat totals, meaning there was no official opposition.

After the 2021 election, George was again moved, this time to be Shadow Minister for Health. He left this post in April 2024, being briefly re-appointed as Shadow Minister for Mid Wales, before leaving this post in June 2024, pending an investigation by the Gambling Commission. George had been selected as the Conservative candidate for the Gwynedd Maldwyn constituency, but following being charged by the Gambling Commission, announced he would not contest the seat, and would leave the Senedd at the 2026 election. However, when nominations closed in April 2026, George announced that he was running as an independent candidate in Gwynedd Maldwyn. He received 2,862 votes (3.5%) and was not re-elected.

== Gambling Commission Investigation ==
During the 2024 United Kingdom general election the UK Gambling Commission Investigation into possible illegal betting on the date of the election informed George he was under investigation. Leader of the Welsh Conservative Party Andrew RT Davies said George was "standing back" from the Shadow Cabinet in the Senedd pending the outcome of the investigation.

On 14 April 2025, George along with Montgomeryshire Conservative MP Craig Williams, Welsh Conservative Party director Thomas James and twelve others were charged with offences under the Gambling Act 2005 to appear at Westminster Magistrates Court on Friday 13 June 2025. He was also suspended from the Welsh Conservatives, and announced he would no longer be standing for re-election following the charges. Despite this he later decided to run as an independent candidate and failed to be re-elected.

== Offices held ==
Senedd
Preceded by Mick Bates	Member of the Senedd for Montgomeryshire; 2011–present	Incumbent
Political offices
Preceded by Angela Burns	Shadow Minister for Health; 2021 – present	Succeeded by TBD
Preceded by TBC	Shadow Minister for Environment; 2011 – 2016	Succeeded by Simon Thomas
