= Mark Isherwood (politician) =

Welsh Conservative politician

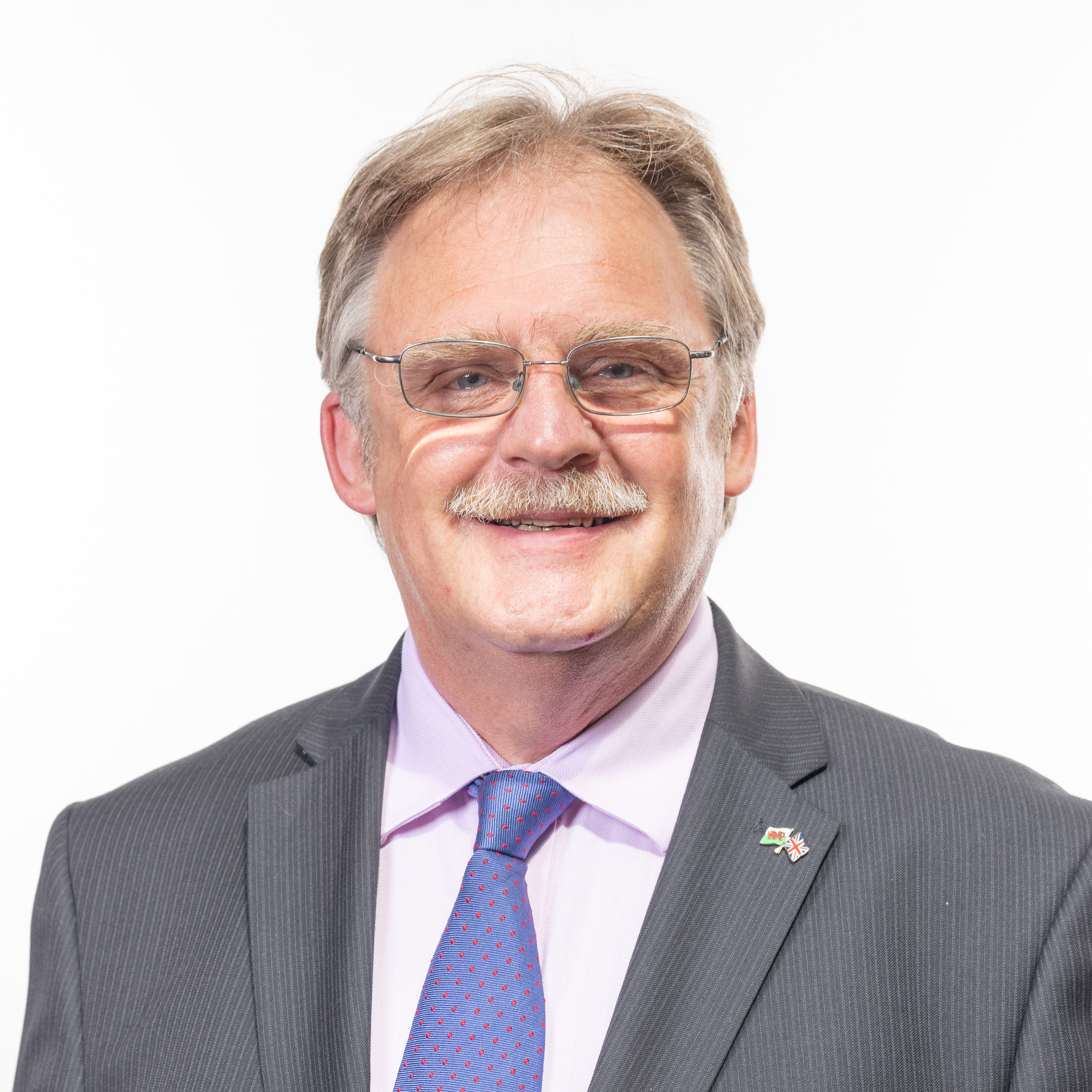
- Isherwood in 2021

Shadow Minister for Housing and Planning (Note: Shadow Minister for Housing, Communities and Local Government 2020-2021 Shadow Minister for Communities and Local Government 2018-2020 Shadow Minister for Communities and Housing 2007-2016)
- In office 18 April 2024 – 12 December 2024
- Leader: Andrew RT Davies
- Succeeded by: Laura Anne Jones
- In office 19 September 2018 – 24 January 2021
- Leader: Paul Davies
- In office 11 May 2007 – 5 May 2016
- Leader: Nick Bourne; Paul Davies Acting; Andrew RT Davies

Shadow Counsel General
- In office 18 April 2024 – 12 December 2024
- Leader: Andrew RT Davies
Past Shadow Cabinet Roles
Welsh Conservative Chief Whip
In office 24 January 2021 – 18 April 2024
Preceded by	Darren Millar
Succeeded by	Darren Millar
Shadow Minister for Social Justice
In office 27 May 2021 – 18 April 2024
Leader	Andrew RT Davies
Preceded by	Role Re-established
Succeeded by	Role Abolished
In office 11 May 2007 – 5 May 2016
Leader	Nick Bourne; Paul Davies Acting; Andrew RT Davies
Preceded by	Leanne Wood
Succeeded by	Leanne Wood 2017
Shadow Finance Minister
In office 24 January 2021 – 29 March 2021
Leader	Andrew RT Davies
Preceded by	Nick Ramsay
Succeeded by	Peter Fox May 2021
Shadow Minister for North Wales
In office 19 September 2018 – 29 March 2021
Leader	Paul Davies; Andrew RT Davies
Succeeded by	Darren Millar May 2021
In office 20 July 2011 – 5 May 2016
Leader	Andrew RT Davies
Shadow Minister for Armed Forces
In office 17 July 2020 – 24 January 2021
Leader	Paul Davies
Shadow Minister for Communities and Europe
In office 6 April 2017 – 19 September 2018
Leader	Andrew RT Davies
Preceded by	Himself
Succeeded by	Role Abolished
Welsh Conservative Party Spokesperson Roles
Mar-May 2021 2003-2005	Finance Spokesperson
Mar-May 2021 May-Jun 2016	North Wales Spokesperson
2016-2017	Communities and Europe Spokesperson
May-Jun 2016 2005-2007	Social Justice Spokesperson
May-Jun 2016	Communities and Housing Spokesperson
2006-2007	Children and Lifelong Learning Spokesperson

Member of the Senedd for North Wales
- In office 1 May 2003 – 7 April 2026
- Preceded by: David Jones

Personal details
- Born: 21 January 1959 (age 67)
- Party: Welsh Conservatives
- Children: 6
- Education: Newcastle University

Mark Allan Isherwood (born 21 January 1959) is a Welsh Conservative Party politician, who served as a Member of the Senedd (MS) for the North Wales region from 2003 until 2026. Isherwood has previously held a number of Shadow Ministerial positions for the Welsh Conservatives since he was first elected, at various points holding portfolios for Finance, Social Justice, North Wales, Europe, Housing, Communities and Local Government, among others.

He is also particularly notable for his advocacy for people with both physical and learning disabilities and impairments. He is himself deaf, and chairs cross party groups on disability, deaf issues and Autism, among others.

== Personal life ==
Isherwood attended Stockport Grammar School. He graduated with a Politics degree from the University of Newcastle upon Tyne. He is the son of Liberal Democrat politician Rodney Isherwood.

Isherwood is an Associate of the Chartered Institute of Bankers. He was North Wales Area Manager for Cheshire Building Society. He was governor of Ysgol Parc y Llan, and was a Board Member of Flintshire Housing Association.

Isherwood is deaf, and one of his children has a learning disability. Isherwood is a patron for a number of charities with a focus on disabled people.

== Political career ==
Isherwood was a Community Councillor in the village of Treuddyn.

In 2001, Isherwood was the Conservative candidate for the constituency of Alyn and Deeside, but was not elected, receiving 26.3% of the vote. In the 2003 Senedd elections Isherwood ran in the Delyn constituency, where he came second to Welsh Labour's Sandy Mewies. He was however elected on the Conservatives' party list in the North Wales electoral region. He was subsequently re-elected on the party's list at elections in 2007, 2011, 2016 and 2021. In 2021 he again ran unsuccessfully for the Delyn constituency, and again came second to Welsh Labour's candidate Hannah Blythyn.

Isherwood has also run for the Delyn constituency in the UK Parliament at the 2015 general election. He was not elected, coming second.

He currently chairs the Senedd Public Accounts and Public Administration committee. He is a member of the committee chair's forum, and the Committee for the Scrutiny of the First Minister. Isherwood further chairs 7 cross party groups - on Autism, Deaf Issues, Disability, Fuel Poverty and Energy Efficiency, Funerals and Bereavement, Hospice and Palliative Care and North Wales. He is also a member of 26 other cross party groupings.

=== Second Senedd (2003–2007) ===
In May 2003, Isherwood was first appointed to a Welsh Conservative front-bench role, as Finance spokesperson. In October 2003, alongside Liberal Democrat Eleanor Burnham, Plaid Cymru's Jocelyn Davies and Welsh Labour's Ann Jones, Isherwood was referred to the South Wales Police for failing to declare on his register of interests that he was employing his wife out of National Assembly funds. Isherwood stated he had not been aware that he was required to do this until being contacted by the BBC for comment, and had contacted Dafydd Elis-Thomas (then Presiding Officer) immediately, and registered his wife's employment. In February 2004, the police announced Isherwood, and the three other members, would not face prosectution over the incident.

In April 2004, Equal opportunities was added alongside Isherwood's finance portfolio, after the previous equal opportunities spokesperson David Davies walked out of the Assembly's equal opportunities committee, after an exchange with a representative from LGBTQ+ Charity Stonewall described by other members of the committee as 'offensive' and 'aggressive'. In October 2004 Isherwood, alongside then Welsh Conservative leader Nick Bourne were criticised for not attending a civil service briefing on the welsh economy held on a monday, typically a constituency day. The day after the 2005 general election, Isherwood was reshuffled from the finance portfolio to social justice, while retaining the equal opportunities portfolio. Over the course of the remainder of the second Senedd, he would have several more spokesperson roles added, being given the role for children, and later in February 2006 life-long learning. The final addition in this term was housing, at some point prior to January 2007.

=== Third and Fourth Senedds (2007–2016) ===
After the 2007 National Assembly elections Isherwood retained responsibilities for social justice, equality and housing, and with the Welsh Conservatives becoming the largest party not in government, they became the Official Opposition, and thus Isherwood became Shadow Minister for these roles.

In May 2011, Paul Davies was appointed acting leader as Welsh Conservative leader Nick Bourne lost his seat at the 2011 National Assembly elections. Davies reshuffled the Welsh Conservative front bench, appointing Isherwood as solely Shadow Minister for Communities and Housing. Shortly thereafter the 2011 Welsh Conservative leadership election was held, which saw Andrew RT Davies elected leader. Davies appointed Isherwood as Shadow Minister for Social Justice, Shadow Minister for Housing and Communities and Shadow North Wales Minister.

=== Fifth and Sixth Senedds (2016–) ===
After the 2016 Assembly elections, the Welsh Conservatives were no longer the Official Opposition with 11 seats to Plaid Cymru's 12. Isherwood was handed briefs on Communities and Europe, being Conservative Party Spokesperson on these matters. In April 2017, due to the newly independent status of Dafydd Elis-Thomas and the defection of Mark Reckless from UKIP to the Conservatives, the Conservatives again became the second largest party, making Isherwood Shadow Minister for Communities and Europe.

This changed in 2018, when Andrew RT Davies resigned as leader of the Welsh Conservatives and was replaced by Paul Davies. Davies appointed Isherwood as Shadow Cabinet Secretary for Communities and Local Government, and again as Shadow Minister for North Wales. In July 2020 Davies again reshuffled his Shadow Cabinet, and Isherwood was appointed Shadow Minister for Local Government, Housing and Communities, and Shadow Minister for the Armed Forces and North Wales.

In January 2021, Paul Davies resigned as leader of the Welsh Conservatives having been accused of breaking COVID-19 rules, and Andrew RT Davies returned as leader of the Welsh Conservatives. RT Davies appointed his new Shadow Cabinet days later, with Isherwood being appointed Shadow Finance Minister, Shadow North Wales Minister, and Welsh Conservative Chief Whip. Between March and May 2021 these portfolios again ceased to be shadow ministries, due to Plaid and the Welsh Conservatives being tied for numbers of MSs. After the 2021 Senedd elections, Isherwood was reshuffled back to being Shadow Minister for Social Justice, alongside the role of Shadow Counsel General. In April 2024 RT Davies reshuffled his cabinet again, this time appointing Isherwood as Shadow Minister for Housing and Planning, alongside maintaining the Shadow Counsel General Portfolio. After RT Davies was replaced by Darren Millar as leader of the Welsh Conservatives in December 2024, Isherwood was removed from his Shadow Ministry, instead chairing the Senedd's Public Accounts and Administration Committee.

==== British Sign Language (Wales) Bill ====
In 2021 and 2022, Isherwood put forward motions to note a proposal for a British Sign Language (Wales) Bill. In April 2024, Isherwood won the ballot for a Member's bill. In May he put forward an explanatory memorandum for the BSL (Wales) Bill. It was approved in June 2024, giving him permission to put forward the bill.

== Political views ==
=== Disability advocacy ===
Isherwood openly describes himself as disabled, and is a noted advocate on disability matters in the Senedd. He chairs the Senedd cross-party groupings on Disability, Autism and Deaf Issues, and is the former chair of the group on Neurological Conditions. He is also a member of cross-party groupings on Diabetes, Learning Disability, Muscular Dystrophy and Neuromuscular conditions and Rare, Genetic and Undiagnosed conditions. He is an advocate for the social model of disability.

In 2004 Isherwood criticised the criminalisation of cannabis, saying that "No-one is wishing to encourage people to break the law, but the concern is that people in pain are being criminalised when they seek what, for them, is an effective form of pain control." Since then, he has repeatedly advocated for its decriminalisation for medicinal use.

In October 2024, Isherwood voted against the principle of assisted suicide in Wales. In the debate preceding the vote he cited the possibiliy of coercion and the possibility of disabled people being marked as terminally ill and therefore made eligible, and stated he believed that palliative care ought to be substantially expanded, rather than allowing assisted suicide.

=== Foreign Policy ===
Isherwood was a vocal supporter of Brexit during and after the 2016 Brexit Referendum.
