= Christine Gwyther =

Welsh politician (born 1959)

- Official portrait, 2003

Secretary for Agriculture and Rural Development
- In office 12 May 1999 – 25 July 2000
- First Minister: Alun Michael
- Preceded by: Government Established
- Succeeded by: Carwyn Jones

Member of the Welsh Assembly for Carmarthen West and South Pembrokeshire
- In office 6 May 1999 – 3 May 2007
- Preceded by: New Assembly
- Succeeded by: Angela Burns

Personal details
- Born: 1959 (age 66–67) Pembroke Dock, Wales
- Party: Labour
- Education: University College Cardiff
- Occupation: Politician

Christine Margery Gwyther (born 1959) is a Welsh Labour politician, who served as Member of the Welsh Assembly for Carmarthen West and South Pembrokeshire from the Assembly's founding 1999 to 2007. She was also the first person to hold responsibility for Agriculture in the Welsh Government, serving as Secretary for Agriculture and Rural Development from May 1999 to July 2000. She lost her seat in the 2007 Welsh Assembly Elections, to Conservative candidate Angela Burns.

== Background ==
Gwyther was born in Pembroke Dock. She attended University College Cardiff, before briefly moving to London for work. She then moved back to West Wales. Before entering politics, she worked as a Pembrokeshire County Council Development Officer.

== Political career ==
Gwyther was election agent for Nick Ainger MP in 1997.

=== National Assembly for Wales ===
Gwyther was selected as the Welsh Labour candidate to contest the Carmarthen West and South Pembrokeshire constituency at the 1999 Welsh assembly election, the first elections to the assembly. She was elected with a majority of 1,492 votes. She was re-elected in 2003, with a reduced majority of 515 votes. In 2007 she lost the seat to Angela Burns of the Welsh Conservatives by just 98 votes. She contested the constituency again in 2011, but was not elected.

==== Agriculture Secretary ====
Gwyther was appointed Secretary for Agriculture and Rural Development by First Minister Alun Michael on 12 May 1999. She is a vegetarian and as a result her appointment was criticised by some farmers and opposition parties. The Welsh Conservatives and the Farmers' Union of Wales both called for her resignation within 12 days of her appointment, while the National Farmers' Union urged that she should be given a chance to be judged on her performance in the role. Allies of Gwyther, as well as presiding officer Dafydd Elis-Thomas, argued that misogyny played a strong role in her treatment. Gwyther faced three censure motions during her 14-month tenure, one of which passed.

She introduced organic, dairy, red meat and diversification support, as well as a sustainable development scheme for Wales, and helped to facilitate deals for the sale of Welsh beef, after the ban on British beef was lifted in August 1999.

In September 1999, in collaboration with Scottish Agriculture Secretary at the time Ross Finnie, Gwyther obtained £20m of financial support for Welsh sheep farmers from Westminster Agriculture Minister Nick Brown, after significant reductions in the price of ewes lead to challenges for farmers. However, a similar scheme for the culling of calves failed, after it was not approved by the European Union's Agriculture Commissioner, Franz Fischler, who stated the scheme must apply to the whole United Kingdom. Gwyther later alleged she had privately been given the green light for the scheme by Fischler, who then changed his mind. A censure motion was passed in the Assembly over the scheme not being secured, but Gwyther retained the support of Welsh Labour and of the Cabinet, and did not resign. A motion of no confidence in the Welsh Assembly Government and First Secretary Alun Michael was put forward by the Welsh Conservatives in response to her not resigning, which failed due to abstention from Plaid Cymru and the Liberal Democrats. Presiding Officer Dafydd Elis-Thomas later said he thought there was an "element of sexism in relation to the agriculture secretary" during the debate on the motion.

Gwyther also initially led the Welsh Government's opposition to efforts from the UK government to introduce GMO crops, and was known to personally oppose their introduction in Wales. Their introduction required support from all devolved governments. On 29 March 2000, the Assembly Agriculture and Rural Affairs committee recommended that she block the use of GMOs. Hours later, Gwyther gave support for the use of the GMOs, saying it was the only "reasonable, legal way forward". A censure motion was proposed against Gwyther for "her failure to address the concerns of the National Assembly for Wales, by failing to secure a GM free environment". The censure motion failed, 26 votes to 20. It was later revealed that their usage was forced, with Gwyther not being told the trial was going to take place until the day the seeds were planted, and that the seeds had already been accidentally sold and planted earlier in the year across the UK. In July 2000, GM crops were banned in Wales, after an earlier assembly motion banning them was found to be lawful.

After Alun Michael resigned as First Minister, Gwyther was initially retained in the cabinet. On 25 July 2000, on the eve of the Royal Welsh Show, she was dismissed from her post by First Minister, Rhodri Morgan, and replaced by Carwyn Jones. Morgan was criticised for this decision. Labour AM Lorraine Barrett said of Gwyther that "Farmers have been very unfair to Christine. I think the fact that she was a woman and a vegetarian to boot, they just couldn't handle it. I think they're much happier now with a meat-eating male." Gwyther later revealed on BBC Wales 2 that she had offered to resign twice, and that Morgan had not accepted.

==== Backbench career ====
Gwyther was elected chair of the Economic Development and Transport committee in May 2001, after Val Feld stood down from the role due to illness. She retained the role in the Second Assembly. She was also founder member of the National Assembly Sustainable Energy Group, and founded the assembly's Women and Democracy Group.

During her time as a backbencher, Gwyther supported a campaign to ban hunting with dogs, opposed the moving of healthcare facilities from Swansea to Cardiff, and supported efforts to allow people with terminal illnesses to die at home.

She lost her seat at the 2007 Welsh Assembly election to the Welsh Conservatives' Angela Burns, after a recount confirmed she had lost by 92 votes.

=== Post-Assembly ===
After losing her seat, she worked for Labour Mid and West Wales AM Alun Davies, who had been elected on the regional list due to her failing to retain her own seat.

In December 2009, Gwyther was selected to contest the Carmarthen East and Dinefwr constituency for election to the UK Parliament at the 2010 general election. She came second, with 26.5% of the vote, 9.2% behind winner Jonathan Edwards. In October 2010 she was selected to once again contest the Carmarthen West and South Pembrokeshire constituency at the 2011 Welsh Assembly election, while simultaneously campaigning for the Yes vote in the 2011 Welsh devolution referendum. Gwyther came second, 1,504 votes behind Angela Burns.

She was one of two candidates to be nominated for the 2012 Police and Crime Commissioner elections for the Dyfed–Powys Police region, losing to the Conservative Christopher Salmon.

Senedd
Preceded by (new post)	Assembly Member for Carmarthen West and South Pembrokeshire; 1999 – 2007	Succeeded by Angela Burns
Political offices
Preceded by (new post)	Minister for Agriculture and Rural Economy; 1999 – 2000	Succeeded by Carwyn Jones
