= Shadow Cabinet of Wales =

Opposition cabinet in Wales

In Wales, a shadow cabinet (Welsh: cabinet cysgodol) is formed from members of the official opposition in the Senedd (Welsh Parliament; Senedd Cymru), the largest party not part of the Welsh Government, to scrutinise ministers in the Welsh Cabinet. It is led by the Leader of the Opposition, who typically appoints members of the Senedd (MSs) from their party as shadow ministers with portfolios which mirror ministerial posts in the Cabinet who scrutinise ministers and can propose their own alternative policies. Other opposition parties in the Senedd also appoint frontbench teams of spokespeople who perform the same function. These are also sometimes styled as "shadow cabinets" by their parties, though unlike the Shadow Cabinet they have no official recognition. Since 2021, the Shadow Cabinet has been formed from members of the Welsh Conservatives led by Andrew RT Davies, who have alternated with Plaid Cymru as the official opposition in the Senedd since its establishment as the National Assembly for Wales in 1999.

The first shadow cabinet of Wales was formed by Plaid Cymru's Dafydd Wigley in 1999. Its members were elected to shadow portfolios by members of the Plaid Cymru Group in the National Assembly for Wales. In 2000, Plaid Cymru's Ieuan Wyn Jones succeeded Wigley as Leader of the Opposition and formed a new shadow cabinet, this time personally appointing its members; since then, members of the Shadow Cabinet have usually been appointed by the Leader of the Opposition. Leaders may reshuffle their shadow cabinet, swapping members' portfolios and appointing new members to the Shadow Cabinet. The official opposition can also appoint party staff and spokespeople to the Shadow Cabinet who have no shadow ministerial portfolio.

The Shadow Cabinet presents itself as an alternative government-in-waiting. It is tasked with scrutinising government ministers, and its members are meant to lead the official opposition in challenging members of the Welsh Government and taking them to account. As party group spokespeople in the Senedd, shadow ministers are able to speak for their respective party and question their relevant ministerial counterparts at plenary sessions of the Senedd.

== List of shadow cabinets ==
=== Summary ===
The party of government is noted in grey.

Date	Official Opposition	Assembly/ Senedd	Seats				Governments
Date	Official Opposition	Assembly/ Senedd	Labour	Plaid Cymru	Conservative	Reform	Governments
Wigley shadow cabinet	18 May 1999	1st	28	17	9	–	Michael (Labour minority); Interim Morgan (Labour minority)
Jones shadow cabinet	9 August 2000	1st	28	17	9	–	Interim Morgan (Labour minority); Morgan I (Labour – LD)
Jones shadow cabinet	May 2003	2nd	30	12	11	–	Morgan II (Labour majority until 2005), minority after 2005 (Note: With the Presiding and Deputy Presiding Officer both coming from the opposition Labour had 30 voting members to the oppositions collective 28. This government officially became a minority government in 2005 after Peter Law left Labour to sit as an independent on the opposition benches, giving the government 29 and the opposition (excluding the Presiding Officer and Deputy) 29.)
Bourne shadow cabinet	May 2007	3rd	26	15	12	–	Morgan III (Labour minority); Morgan IV (Labour – Plaid); Jones I (Labour – Plaid)
First Andrew RT Davies shadow cabinet	July 2011	4th	30	11	14	–	Jones II (Labour minority)
Wood shadow cabinet	May 2016	5th	29	12	11	–	Jones III (Labour–LD minority, Lib Dem coalition)
None	14 October 2016	5th	29	11	11	–	Jones III (Labour–LD minority, Lib Dem coalition)
Second Andrew RT Davies shadow cabinet	6 April 2017	5th	29	11	12	–	Jones III (Labour–LD minority, Lib Dem coalition)
Paul Davies shadow cabinet	27 June 2018	5th	29	10	12	–	Jones III (Labour–LD minority, Lib Dem coalition)
Paul Davies shadow cabinet	27 June 2018	5th	29	10	12	–	Drakeford I (Labour–LD–IND majority)
Third Andrew RT Davies shadow cabinet	23 January 2021	5th	29	10	11	–	Drakeford I (Labour–LD–IND majority)
None	29 March 2021	5th	29	10	10	–	Drakeford I (Labour–LD–IND majority)
Fourth Andrew RT Davies shadow cabinet	27 May 2021	6th	30	13	16	–	Drakeford II (Labour minority); Gething (Labour minority); Eluned Morgan (Labour minority)
Millar shadow cabinet	12 December 2024	6th	30	13	15	–	Eluned Morgan (Labour minority)
None	20 January 2026	6th	29	13	13	–	Eluned Morgan (Labour minority)
Thomas shadow cabinet	19 May 2026	7th	9	43	7	34	ap Iorwerth (Plaid Cymru minority)
Jenner shadow cabinet	15 September 2026	7th	9	44	7	33	ap Iorwerth (Plaid Cymru minority)

=== 2016 Plaid-Conservative Shadow Cabinets ===
At the 2016 election, Plaid Cymru, led by Leanne Wood, won 12 seats to the Welsh Conservatives' 11, and thus became the largest party not in government. On 14 October 2016 Dafydd Elis-Thomas left Plaid Cymru to sit as an independent, so that Plaid Cymru and the Welsh Conservatives both held 11 seats. During this period, Wood was not referred to as Leader of the Opposition, but merely as leader of Plaid Cymru. The Conservative group grew to 12 when Mark Reckless defected from UKIP to the Conservative group on 6 April 2017, and the Welsh Conservative leader, Andrew RT Davies at the time, was referred to as Leader of the Opposition once more.

=== Plaid Cymru team, 2023–26 ===
Rhun ap Iorwerth was announced as a new leader of Plaid Cymru on the 16 June 2023. He announced his shadow cabinet on the 27 June. Plaid Cymru tied the Welsh Conservatives with the second-largest grouping in the Senedd prior to the 2026 Senedd election. Prior to this, while not the leading opposition, Plaid Cymru also formed a team which they labelled as a "shadow cabinet".

=== Conservative team, 2024–26 ===
In December 2024, Darren Millar succeeded Andrew RT Davies as leader of the Welsh Conservatives Senedd Group and announced his shadow cabinet. It underwent a minor re-shuffle in April 2025. Until January 2026, Welsh Conservatives formed the second-largest group in the Senedd as of 2025, therefore its leader was deemed the leader of the opposition in the Senedd. However, due to the removal of James Evans from the Conservative group, the number of Welsh Conservative and Plaid Cymru seats tied, resulting in no official opposition

== See also ==
- Ap Iorwerth government
