= Darren Millar =

Welsh politician (born 1976)

Darren Millar MS
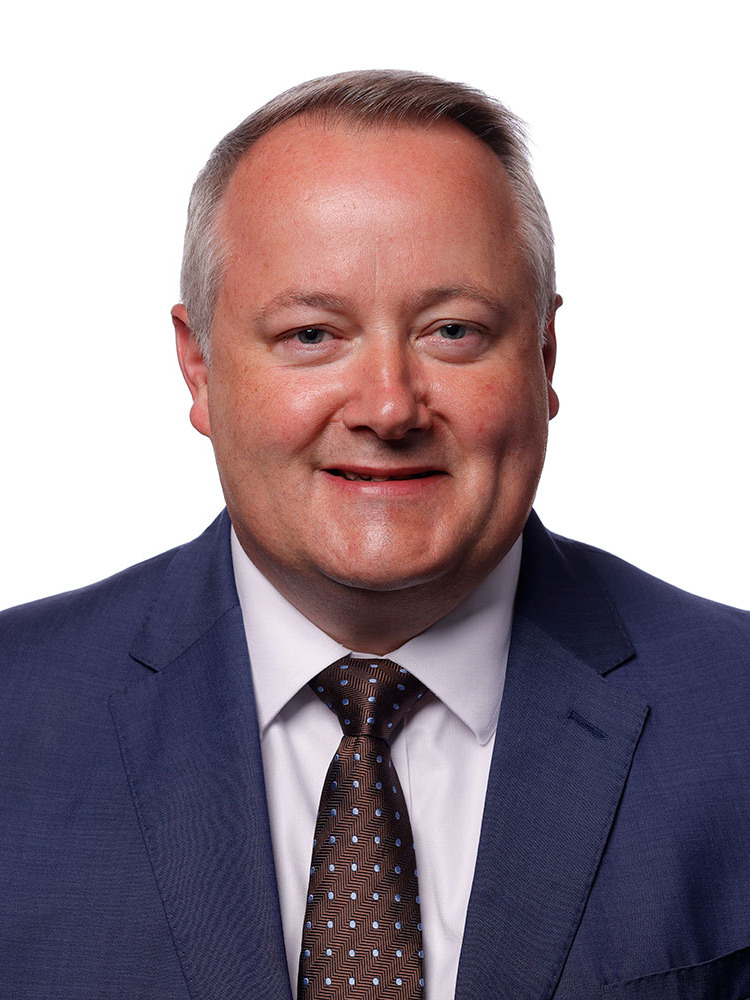
- Official portrait, 2026

Leader of the Welsh Conservative Party
- Incumbent
- Assumed office 5 December 2024
- UK party leader: Kemi Badenoch
- Preceded by: Andrew RT Davies

Leader of the Opposition in Wales
- In office 5 December 2024 – 20 January 2026
- Monarch: Charles III
- First Minister: Eluned Morgan
- Deputy: Paul Davies
- Preceded by: Andrew RT Davies
- Succeeded by: Dan Thomas (Note: Office vacant between 20 January and 12 May 2026.)
Past Shadow Cabinet Roles
Shadow Minister for the Constitution and North Wales
In office 27 May 2021 – 5 December 2024
Leader	Andrew RT Davies
Preceded by	Mark Isherwood North Wales
Succeeded by	Paul Davies Constitution; Gareth Davies North Wales
Welsh Conservative Chief Whip
In office 27 May 2021 – 5 December 2024
Leader	Andrew RT Davies
Preceded by	Mark Isherwood
Succeeded by	Paul Davies
In office 18 September 2018 – 23 January 2021
Leader	Paul Davies
Preceded by	Paul Davies
Succeeded by	Mark Isherwood
Shadow Minister for External Affairs and International Relations
In office 18 September 2018 – 23 January 2021
Leader	Paul Davies
Shadow Minister for Education
In office 6 April 2017 – 18 September 2018
Leader	Andrew RT Davies; Paul Davies Interim
Preceded by	Angela Burns
Succeeded by	Suzy Davies
Shadow Minister for Health
In office 18 May 2011 – 5 May 2016
Leader	Paul Davies Interim; Andrew RT Davies
Preceded by	Nick Ramsay
Succeeded by	Rhun ap Iorwerth
Shadow Minister for Economy and Transport
In office 26 November 2010 – 18 May 2011
Leader	Nick Bourne
Preceded by	David Melding
Succeeded by	Nick Ramsay Economy; Byron Davies Transport
Shadow Minister for Communities and Local Government
In office 27 February 2009 – 26 November 2010
Leader	Nick Bourne
Preceded by	Nick Ramsay
Succeeded by	Jonathan Morgan
Shadow Minister for the Environment and Planning
In office 29 June 2007 – 27 February 2009
Leader	Nick Bourne
Preceded by	Glyn Davies
Succeeded by	Angela Burns

Member of the Senedd
- Incumbent
- Assumed office 3 May 2007
- Preceded by: Alun Pugh
- Constituency: Clwyd West (2007–2026); Clwyd (2026–present)

Personal details
- Born: Darren David Millar; July 27, 1976 (age 50) Towyn, Wales
- Party: Welsh Conservatives
- Children: 2
- Website: www.darrenmillar.wales

Darren David Millar (born 27 July 1976) is a Welsh politician who has served as the leader of the Welsh Conservatives since 2024. He was elected Member of the Senedd (MS) for Clwyd West in 2007 and since May 2026 has represented Clwyd. Millar was also the Leader of the Opposition in Wales from December 2024 to January 2026.

== Background ==
Millar was born and grew up in Towyn.

=== Early career and qualifications ===
Before being elected to the Senedd, Millar worked as a manager for an international charity supporting persecuted Christians around the world. He has also been an accountant working in the construction, care home and telecommunications industries.

Millar holds several professional qualifications: he is a Chartered Manager, a Fellow of the Chartered Management Institute (CMI), a Fellow of the Institute of Leadership and Management (ILM), and a Fellow of the Royal Society for the encouragement of Arts, Manufactures and Commerce (RSA).

=== Religious ministry ===
Millar was commissioned as a Minister by the Assemblies of God in Great Britain in May 2015. He formerly was chief executive of UK charity, The Pocket Testament League, which describes itself as "a group of Christians who have committed to reading the Word of God, carrying the Word with them wherever they go, and sharing the Word with others." He stepped down from the role at the end of August 2025.

Millar is also involved with the Evan Roberts Institute, a registered charity named after the Welsh revivalist, which was formed in 2013 to safeguard sites of religious and spiritual significance in Wales. The institute lists its charitable objective as "advancing the Christian religion in Wales… through the preservation of sites of religious significance".

== Political career ==
Millar joined Clwyd North West Conservative Association at age 15, and shortly after became chairman of the Young Conservative Branch.

=== Local government ===
In 1999, Millar ran for the Towyn ward on Conwy County Borough Council, and for Towyn and Kinmel Bay town council. He was not elected to the county council, but was elected to the town council. From 2000 to 2001, Millar was mayor of the township of Towyn and Kinmel Bay. He was also a member of Conwy County Borough Council from 2004, the North Wales Police Authority and the North Wales Fire and Rescue Service.

In 2005, he was the sole dissenter to a budget that saw an increase of 5% in the policing budget, and therefore an increase in local council tax.

In 2006, while a member of Conwy Council, Millar was referred to the standards watchdog, after complaints from the Unite, Unison and GMB trade unions about comments he made alleging that staff were abusing or misusing the sick pay system.

=== Senedd ===
In the 2003 Senedd election, at age 25, he stood unsuccessfully as the Conservative candidate for the Vale of Clwyd.

Millar was first elected to represent Clwyd West in 2007, and was re-elected in the 2011, 2016 and 2021 elections.

==== Third Senedd ====
In 2006, Millar was selected to contest the Clwyd West seat. During a hustings in April 2007, Millar allegedly described homosexuality as a sin, and stated he believed that creationism should be taught in science lessons. Millar alleged that he had been misrepresented, and stated that he did not believe anyone should be discriminated against on the basis of sexuality, and stated that "school governors, parents and teachers should have flexibility in their curriculum". He was successfully elected to the Clwyd West seat, unseating the incumbent Labour MS, Alun Pugh. Pugh was the only Cabinet Minister to be defeated in the election.

After his election to the Senedd in 2007, Millar was appointed Shadow Minister for Environment and Planning by Nick Bourne. While in this role he campaigned for targets to reduce emissions, supported the banning of single-use plastic bags, and was supportive of investment in biofuels. He also initially said that fear of flooding must not prevent construction on floodplains, but that "you've also got to look at strengthening our flood defences", but later supported a ban on building on floodplains, and a substantial increase in spending on flood defences.

He was critical of the Welsh Government's provision of free prescriptions, saying it would lead to prescription tourism, and that he was aware of caravan owners who registered with GPs in his constituency to avoid paying charges.

He served in this role until February 2009, when he was moved to be Shadow Minister for Communities and Local Government. In November 2010, he was appointed Shadow Minister for Economy and Transport.

==== Fourth and Fifth Senedds ====
After his re-election in 2011, he was appointed Shadow Minister for Health by interim leader Paul Davies. He retained this role after Andrew RT Davies was elected leader and formalised the interim Shadow Cabinet, and throughout the remainder of the term. After the 2016 Senedd elections, Millar was appointed Welsh Conservative education spokesperson, as Plaid Cymru became the Official Opposition. In April 2017, he became Shadow Minister for Education, as the Welsh Conservatives returned to opposition.

Millar was discussed as a candidate to replace Andrew RT Davies at the 2018 Welsh Conservatives leadership election, but he did not contest the election. After Paul Davies was elected as leader of the Welsh Conservatives, Millar was appointed as Welsh Conservative Chief Whip, Welsh Conservative Policy Director, and Shadow Cabinet Secretary for External Affairs and International Relations.

==== Sixth Senedd ====
He returned to the role of Chief Whip in May 2021, after the 2021 Senedd election, alongside a role as Shadow Minister for the Constitution and North Wales.

Millar has been drawn to table a Members' Bill on three occasions.

In November 2023, he was selected as the Conservative Party prospective parliamentary candidate for the new constituency of Clwyd North at the 2024 general election. He came second, losing to the Labour candidate by 1,196 votes.

In 2024, Millar tabled a non-binding motion of no confidence in First Minister Vaughan Gething, over donations made during the 2024 Welsh Labour leadership election and the sacking of former Social Partnership Minister Hannah Blythyn. The motion passed 29-27. Gething described the motion as a 'gimmick' and said he would remain as First Minister.

=== Leadership of the Welsh Conservatives in the Senedd ===
After Andrew RT Davies resigned as leader of the Welsh Conservatives in the Senedd, Millar put out a statement saying he would run to lead the Senedd group. He quickly obtained the support of six of his colleagues, Paul Davies, Russell George, Tom Giffard, James Evans, Altaf Hussain and Gareth Davies within 24 hours, and the whole group within 48 hours.

In the 2026 Senedd election, was elected as the Conservatives' top candidate in the Clwyd constituency.

== Political views ==
=== Brexit ===
He was one of four then-sitting Conservative MSs (along with Andrew RT Davies, Janet Finch-Saunders and Mark Isherwood) to vote for Brexit in the 2016 Brexit referendum.

=== Health and NHS ===
Millar has been a "fierce critic" of NHS prescriptions having been made free. He has argued that free prescriptions would lead to "prescription tourism", claiming he was aware of caravan owners who registered with GPs in his constituency to avoid paying charges.

As a former Shadow Health Minister, Millar has been a vocal critic of the Betsi Cadwaladr University Health Board's performance. He has called for strong leadership to address what he describes as the health board's "four years of failures" under Welsh Government control. In his 2025 keynote speech as party leader, he pledged to "declare not a climate emergency and not a nature emergency but a Health Emergency".

=== Education ===
Millar has been critical of Wales's educational performance, describing the Welsh education system as being "at the bottom of the UK and global education league tables". As a former Shadow Education Minister, he has criticised cuts to education spending, arguing that with Wales receiving £1.20 for every £1 spent on education in England, "there's absolutely no excuse whatsoever for the reduction in school spending here in Wales".

He supports educational choice and has opposed what he describes as "language bans" in schools. Regarding Gwynedd County Council's proposal to phase out English-medium education, Millar stated: "Parents and pupils in every part of Wales must have the right to be educated through either of our country's two official languages: English or Welsh." While describing himself as "proudly pro-Wales and pro-Welsh language", he argues that promoting Welsh should be through "encouragement and choice – not compulsion".

=== Environment and climate change ===
During his time as Shadow Minister for Environment and Planning, Millar campaigned for targets to reduce emissions, supported the banning of single-use plastic bags, and was supportive of investment in biofuels.

On flood defences, Millar initially said that fear of flooding must not prevent construction on floodplains, but that "you've also got to look at strengthening our flood defences". He later supported a ban on building on floodplains and a substantial increase in spending on flood defences. Millar has been particularly vocal about improving flood defences in Towyn and Kinmel Bay, areas that were devastated by floods in 1990, with his own family home being affected.

=== Immigration ===
In his leadership role, Millar has taken a strong stance on immigration, stating that "millions of people in Wales are rightly concerned about immigration, and it's clear that action is needed to get numbers down". He has argued that "we simply don't have enough homes hospital beds or school places to cater for a population which grows each year by a population size of Cardiff, Swansea and Wrexham combined". He has called for the people of Wales to see "immigration down they want foreign criminals gone and they don't want their hard-earned taxes to be lining the pockets of greedy immigration lawyers, who undermine our borders and security".

=== Constitutional matters ===
Millar opposes further devolution and the expansion of the Senedd. In his 2025 keynote speech, he pledged that "only the Conservative and Unionist Party will reverse the increase in Senedd Members and ensure that no more powers are devolved". He has described the planned expansion of the Senedd as "absurd" and criticised it as costing "tens of millions of pounds of taxpayers' money every single year".

=== Women's rights ===
Millar has stated he is pro-life but that he "believes in freedom of choice and personal responsibility" and is "not a person who likes to impose [his] views on other people".

== Controversies ==
=== Association with Yang Tuck Yoong ===
Millar has faced criticism for his association with Yang Tuck Yoong, a senior pastor in the Pentecostal Cornerstone Community Church in Singapore who has described homosexuality as an "abomination" and a "sin". In 2013, Yoong said that homosexuality "is far more rampant, militant and organised than most of us actually believe". He also urged the church to "rise up and take a stand".

Human rights campaigner Peter Tatchell expressed that Yang Tuck Yoong's views are "not compatible with humanitarian values". In 2019, Millar and his colleague Russell George were urged to cut their links with the Evan Roberts Institute due to its connection with Pastor Yang. Millar told the BBC: "No one should be discriminated against on the basis of their sexual orientation or religious beliefs." In 2019, Millar told the BBC he did not share Yang Tuck Yoong's views.

=== COVID-19 regulations investigation ===
In January 2021, the Senedd Commission investigated Millar for an alleged breach of COVID-19 regulations. The investigation concerned allegations that Millar, Welsh Conservative leader Paul Davies, party chief of staff Paul Smith, and Labour MS Alun Davies had consumed alcohol in a Senedd tea room on 8 December 2020, four days after a ban on the sale, supply and consumption of alcohol in licensed premises had come into force in Wales.

Millar resigned from his frontbench roles on 23 January 2021 after Paul Davies resigned as party leader the same day. In his resignation statement, Millar said: "While I am advised that I did not breach coronavirus regulations, I am very sorry for my actions, especially given the impact of the tough restrictions that people and businesses are enduring." He explained that on both evenings he had "served myself a pre-ordered, pre-prepared meal that was reheated in the microwave and ate it while drinking an alcoholic beverage and discussing work matters with colleagues".

Both Millar and Davies were later cleared of any wrongdoing by South Wales Police, Cardiff City Council, the Senedd Commission and the Senedd Standards of Conduct Committee. In April 2022 a report published by the Senedd Standards Committee found that no laws or standards of conduct had been breached.

=== Comments on homosexuality and creationism ===
During a hustings in April 2007, Millar allegedly described homosexuality as a sin and stated he believed that creationism should be taught in science lessons. Millar alleged that he had been misrepresented, and stated that he did not believe anyone should be discriminated against on the basis of sexuality, and stated that "school governors, parents and teachers should have flexibility in their curriculum".

=== Council standards investigation ===
In 2006, while a member of Conwy Council, Millar was referred to the standards watchdog after complaints from the Unite, Unison and GMB trade unions about comments he made alleging that staff were abusing or misusing the sick pay system.

== Personal life ==
Millar lives in the Kinmel Bay area with his wife and two children. He enjoys reading and history, and is a Christian, attending Festival Church. He has been a citizen of both the United Kingdom and the Republic of Ireland for decades.

Senedd
Preceded by Alun Pugh	Member of the Senedd for Clwyd West; 2007–present	Incumbent
Political offices
Preceded by Elin Jones	Shadow Minister for the Environment; June 2007 – Feb 2009	Succeeded by Angela Burns
Preceded by Nick Ramsay	Shadow Minister for Communities and Local Government; Feb 2007 – Nov 2010	Succeeded by Jonathan Morgan
Preceded by David Melding	Shadow Minister for Economy and Transport; Nov 2010– May 2011	Succeeded by
Preceded by	Shadow Minister for Health; May 2011– July 2011	Succeeded by
Preceded by	Shadow Minister for Health & Social Services; July 2011–2016	Succeeded by Rhun ap Iorwerth
Party political offices
Preceded by Andrew RT Davies	Leader of the Welsh Conservatives; 2024–present	Incumbent
