= Wood shadow cabinet =

Shadow cabinet of Wales (2016)

Wood Shadow Cabinet
- Shadow Cabinet of Wales
- May 2016 - October 2016
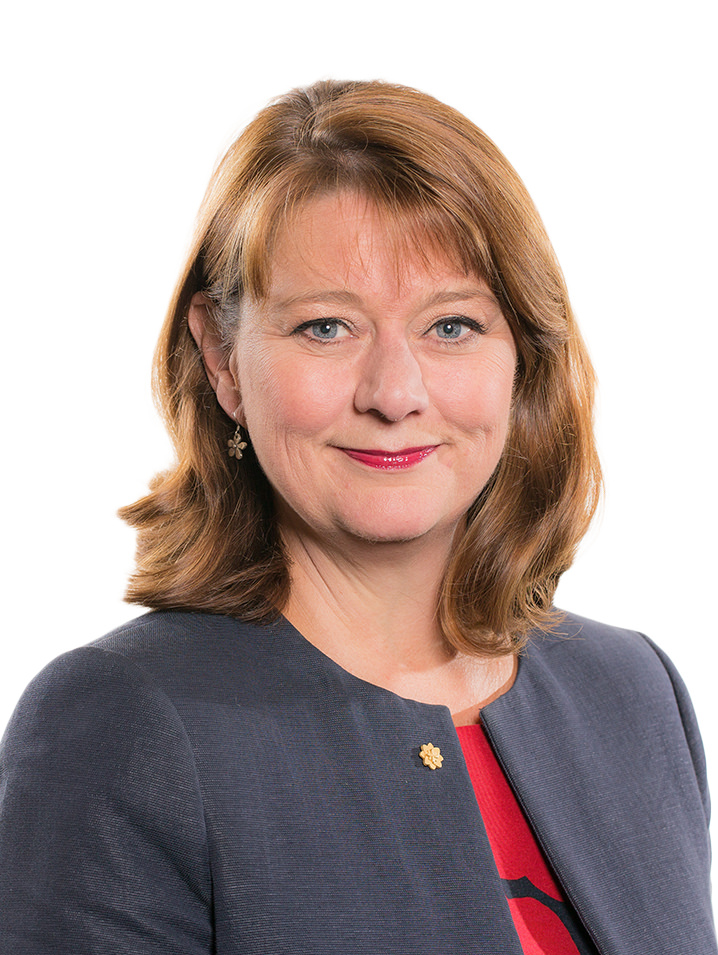
- Official portrait, 2016
- Date formed: 25 May 2016
- Date dissolved: 14 October 2016

People and organisations
- Monarch: Elizabeth II
- Leader of the Opposition and Shadow First Minister: Leanne Wood
- Member party: Plaid Cymru
- Status in legislature: Official Opposition

History
- Incoming formation: 2016 National Assembly for Wales election
- Outgoing formation: Dafydd Elis-Thomas (Note: Elis-Thomas left Plaid Cymru which led to the dissolve of the Wood shadow cabinet after Plaid Cymru was tied in seats with the Conservatives. No shadow cabinet existed until Mark Reckless joined the Conservatives in the National Assembly in 2017.)
- Legislature term: 5th National Assembly for Wales
- Predecessor: First Shadow Cabinet of Andrew RT Davies
- Successor: Second Shadow Cabinet of Andrew RT Davies

Leanne Wood became Leader of the Opposition in the National Assembly for Wales after Plaid Cymru became the largest party not in government after the 2016 National Assembly for Wales election. 12 Plaid Cymru AMs were elected, as opposed to 11 Welsh Conservative AMs.

Plaid Cymru had not formed the official opposition since the Shadow Cabinet of Ieuan Wyn Jones, ending in 2007, having been in government from 2007-2011 and the third largest party from 2011-2016. Wood had served as leader of Plaid Cymru since 2012, and appointed her Shadow Cabinet in May 2016.

In October 2016, Dafydd Elis-Thomas left Plaid Cymru, moving to sit as an independent AM. This tied Plaid Cymru and the Welsh Conservatives on 11 seats, meaning no official opposition was formed. In April 2017, Mark Reckless joined the Welsh Conservative group in the Senedd, meaning the Welsh Conservatives now formed the official opposition, leading Andrew RT Davies to form his Second Shadow Cabinet.

== Appointments ==
On the 25 May 2016, Leanne Wood announced her Shadow Cabinet. She appointed Adam Price as Shadow Minister for Business, Economy and Finance, Llyr Gruffydd to the role of Shadow Minister for Education, Rhun ap Iorwerth to the role of Shadow Minister for Health and Dafydd Elis-Thomas as Government Liaison and also responsibility for the then in development Wales Bill. She also appointed Simon Thomas to the position of Shadow Minister for Energy, Bethan Sayed (Note: At the time known by her maiden name Bethan Jenkins) in the role of Shadow Minister for Housing, Siân Gwenllian as Shadow Minister for Local Government, Neil McEvoy as Shadow Minister for Sport and Tourism, Dai Lloyd as Plaid Cymru Assembly Group Chair and Shadow Minister for Culture and Infrastructure, and Steffan Lewis as Shadow Minister for External Affairs, non-devolved matters, police, criminal justice and social protection.

== Members ==
Portfolio	Shadow Minister	Constituency	Term
Leader of the Opposition; Leader of Plaid Cymru	Leanne Wood AM	Rhondda	May 2016 - October 2016
Shadow Minister for Business, Economy and Finance	Adam Price AM	Carmarthen East and Dinefwr	May 2016 - October 2016
Shadow Minister for Education	Llyr Gruffydd AM	North Wales	May 2016 - October 2016
Shadow Minister for Health	Rhun ap Iorwerth AM	Ynys Môn	May 2016 - October 2016
Shadow Minister for Energy	Simon Thomas AM	Mid and West Wales	May 2016 - October 2016
Shadow Minister for Housing	Bethan Sayed AM	South Wales West	May 2016 - October 2016
Government Liaison; Responsibility for the Wales Bill	Dafydd Elis-Thomas AM	Dwyfor Meirionnydd	May 2016 - October 2016
Shadow Minister for Local Government	Siân Gwenllian AM	Arfon	May 2016 - October 2016
Shadow Minister for Sport and Tourism	Neil McEvoy AM	South Wales Central	May 2016 - October 2016
Plaid Cymru Welsh Assembly Group Chair; Shadow Minister for Culture and Infrastructure	Dai Lloyd AM	South Wales West	May 2016 - October 2016
Shadow Minister for External Affairs, non-devolved matters, police, criminal justice and social protection	Steffan Lewis AM	South Wales East	May 2016 - October 2016
