= Suzy Davies =

Welsh politician

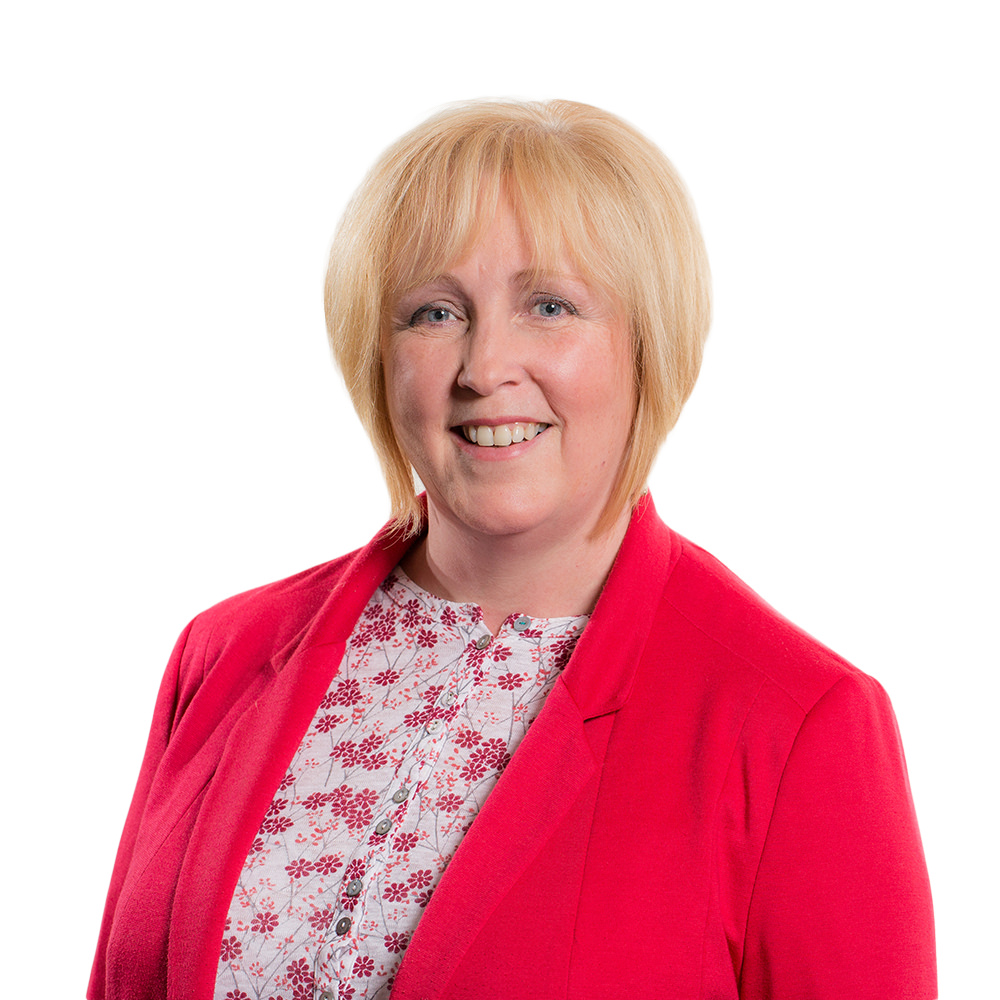
- Davies in 2016

Member of the Senedd for South Wales West
- In office 6 May 2011 – 29 April 2021
- Preceded by: Alun Cairns
- Succeeded by: Tom Giffard

Personal details
- Born: Swansea, Wales
- Party: Conservative
- Website: www.suzydaviesam.com

Suzy Davies (born 3 January) is a Welsh Conservative Party politician, who served as a Member of the Senedd (MS) for South Wales West from 2011 to 2021. She was elected first on the Welsh Conservatives party list for the region in the 2011 election.

== Background ==
Suzy Davies was born in Swansea, and grew up in Bridgend, Aberdare, Cardiff, and Brecon. A graduate of Exeter University and the University of Glamorgan (the latter now the University of South Wales), she is married with two sons. After a career in both marketing and management, she became a solicitor.

She has trained as a mentor for young offenders and has mentored with Prime Cymru. Davies has also been a trustee of a number of children's projects and volunteered with community support groups. She has written for various publications and was one of the founding board members of the Welsh International Film Festival.

== Early political career ==
Prior to her election as an Assembly Member in 2011, Davies contested UK parliamentary seats twice for the Welsh Conservative Party. At the 2005 general election she fought in Carmarthen East and Dinefwr, finishing in third position but increasing the Conservative vote share by 0.8%. She contested the 2010 general election as the Conservative candidate for Brecon and Radnorshire, losing out to Roger Williams of the Liberal Democrats. This followed up on the work she did as the Conservative candidate for Brecon and Radnorshire at the 2007 National Assembly for Wales election where she finished second behind Liberal Democrats incumbent Kirsty Williams but with a 3.7% increase in the vote share.

== Senedd Member ==
After being elected to the National Assembly for Wales, Davies was appointed as Shadow Minister for Tourism, Culture and the Welsh Language by Leader of the Opposition, Andrew RT Davies. She sat on the Constitutional & Legislative Affairs Committee as well as the Children & Young People Committee.

In May 2013, she was named honorary President of Swansea Conservative Future.

She was re-elected as top of the Conservative list in 2016, but was moved down the list in 2021 and lost her seat.

=== Issues and campaigns ===
As an AM, Davies has been active in various local campaigns, most notably in her opposition to the proposed closure of the Princess of Wales Hospital.

She has also campaigned with the British Heart Foundation to make the teaching of CPR a mandatory element of the secondary school curriculum. She criticised the Welsh Government for a 'lack of enthusiasm' for the subject, claiming that compulsory teaching would require little additional government resource. In her final months as a Member of the Senedd, in March 2021, Welsh Government reversed their decision and announced that schools in Wales would instead be required to teach lifesaving skills and first aid under the Wales' new curriculum.

She has also been active in the 'Safe Routes to School' campaign, and opposed the closure of Cwrt Sart School.

In June 2020, in her role as Shadow Minister for Education, Davies called on Welsh Government to delay the implementation of their new school curriculum. Despite the Education Minister at the time ignoring these calls, Davies ultimately did see success in her campaign as Jeremy Miles, the newly appointed Education Minister following the 2021 Senedd election, took a lead from her calls and confirmed in July 2021 that the new curriculum would be delayed for a year.

Davies has also worked to encourage more women to get involved in politics and has chaired Women2Win Wales, an organisation set up to encourage more women to stand for the Welsh Conservatives. When discussing the 2021 Senedd elections she said she was "disappointed new women coming into politics were not being given as much of a chance as men."

=== Leadership Bid ===
Following the resignation of Andrew RT Davies as leader of the Welsh Conservatives in June 2018, Davies formally announced her plan to run for the role and force a contest after fellow Conservative AM Paul Davies had announced his nomination.

This led to the 2018 Welsh Conservatives leadership election which ran from 29 June to 6 September 2018.

She called for "new energy under a new leader who can reach out to new audiences" saying that she wanted "a modern Welsh party which celebrates and fights for the union of the United Kingdom with every fibre as well as celebrating and sharing our love of Wales and our commitment to free it from Labour control."

During her campaign she also questioned the structure of the Welsh Conservatives, saying that the party needed to "catch up with devolution" and "give transparency and more power to members."

Davies gained further attention when she said drunken people who need ambulance help should pay the cost of the call-out, citing the need for people to take "personal responsibility for actions which were adding to the workload of a "stretched" NHS."

Following the conclusion of the contest, won by Paul Davies, Paul Davies thanked "his rival Suzy Davies and her team for the 'well mannered, courteous contest' they had fought, vowing that whatever happened they would remain friends." Suzy Davies "reiterated this following his appointment, tweeting that 'we're still on the same side'."

== After Senedd ==
=== Tourism ===
Four months after the 2021 Senedd election Davies was appointed Chair of Wales Tourism Alliance (WTA), an organisation which provides a "collective voice to put forward the views of the industry to Welsh Government and beyond."

She had previously chaired the Senedd's Cross Party Group on Tourism and her family runs a tourism business in Mid Wales.

Following the UK Government's Budget Statement in October 2021, Davies called on the Welsh Government to give more support to Welsh tourism businesses through "prioritise[ing] support for business rates, staffing, training and specific capital investment in Wales’ tourism sector with the money it receives from UK Government's Budget."

After the announcement of a 'Co-Operation Agreement' between Welsh Government and Plaid Cymru, which sets out 46 areas the two would work jointly towards over the next three years, Davies voiced concern on behalf of the Welsh tourism industry and criticised the Agreement's approach to tourism, claiming that it "resurrects the possibility of a tourism tax being introduced in Wales through local government financing reform."

=== Culture ===
In October 2021 it was announced Davies had been appointed to the board of the Iris Prize. Prior to her involvement in politics she had, in 1989, been a founding board member of the Welsh International Film Festival with Iris Prize Director Berwyn Rowlands and had also previously worked in marketing and management at Swansea Grand Theatre and in cultural roles in Mid Wales in both Newtown and at Aberystwyth Arts Centre.

=== Heart screening and defibrillators ===
Following her campaigning work as a Member of the Senedd calling on Welsh Government to make age-appropriate lifesaving lessons part of the Welsh curriculum, Davies was named as a Vice-President of the Welsh heart screening charity Calon Heart Screening and Defibrillators.

=== Education ===
In November 2021 it was announced that Davies, former Shadow Education Minister and previously member of the Senedd's Education and Welsh Language Committees, had taken up an unpaid role as a board member of Colegau Cymru an education charity which promotes the public benefit of further education in Wales.

=== Equality ===
Following on from her work to encourage women to stand for election, Davies was elected to the board of Women's Equality Network Wales (WEN Wales), a charity which campaigns for "a Wales where all women and men have equal authority and opportunity to shape society and their own lives", in November 2021.

== Office held ==
Senedd
Preceded by Alun Cairns	Member of the Senedd for South Wales West; 2011–2021	Succeeded by Tom Giffard
Political offices
Preceded by TBC	Shadow Minister for Culture and Welsh Language; 2011-2016	Succeeded by post-reorganised
Preceded by TBC	Shadow Minister for Social Services; 2016-2018	Succeeded by Janet Finch-Saunders
Preceded by Angela Burns	Shadow Minister for Education; 2018-2021	Succeeded by Laura Anne Jones
