= Paul Davies (Conservative politician) =

Former Leader of the Welsh Conservative Party

Paul Davies MS
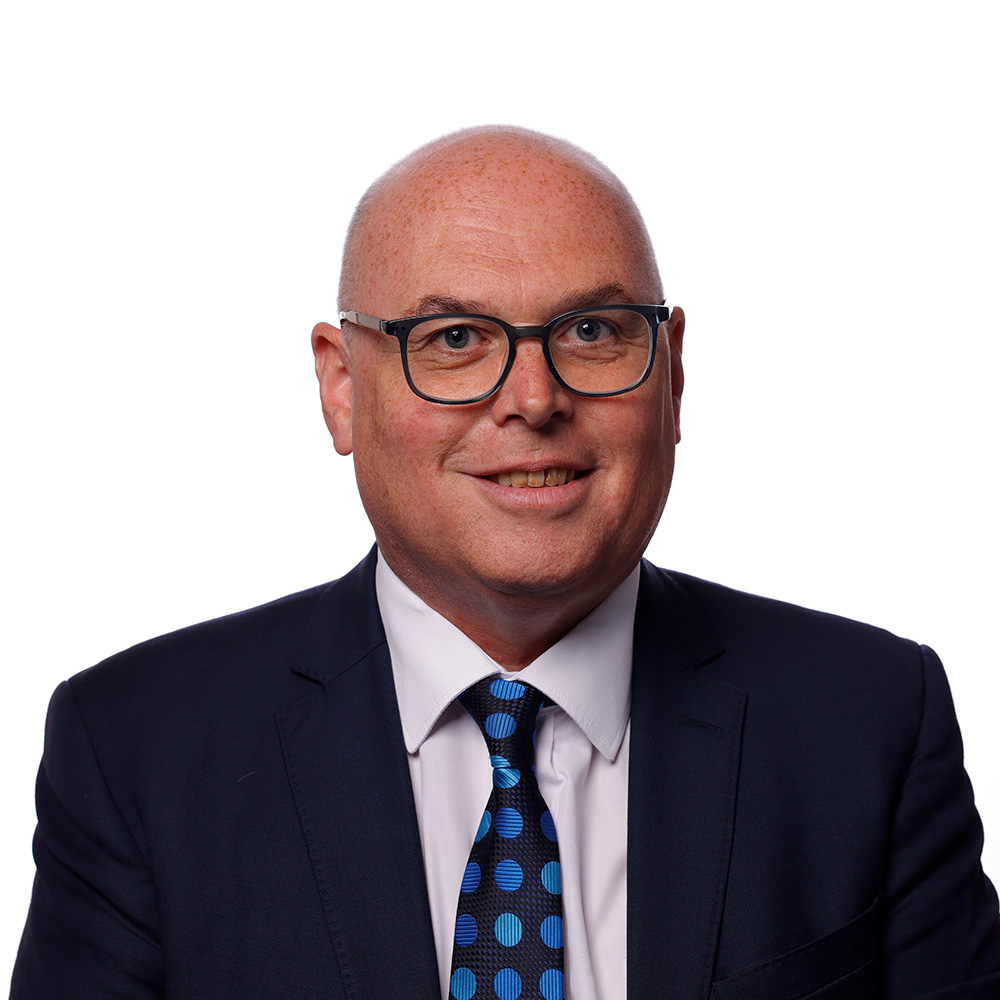
- Official portrait, 2026

Welsh Conservative Chief Whip
- Incumbent
- Assumed office 12 December 2024
- Leader: Darren Millar
- Preceded by: Darren Millar

Shadow Cabinet Secretary for Constitution and External Affairs
- In office 12 December 2024 – 20 January 2026
- Leader: Darren Millar
- Preceded by: Darren Millar
- Succeeded by: Adrian Mason

Leader of the Opposition
- In office 27 June 2018 – 23 January 2021
- Monarch: Elizabeth II
- First Minister: Carwyn Jones; Mark Drakeford
- Preceded by: Andrew RT Davies
- Succeeded by: Andrew RT Davies

Leader of the Welsh Conservative Party
- In office 6 September 2018 – 23 January 2021 (Note: Acting: 27 June – 6 September 2018)
- Deputy: Suzy Davies
- Leader: Theresa May; Boris Johnson
- Preceded by: Andrew RT Davies
- Succeeded by: Andrew RT Davies
- Acting; 6 May 2011 – 14 July 2011
- Leader: David Cameron
- Preceded by: Nick Bourne
- Succeeded by: Andrew RT Davies

Deputy Leader of the Welsh Conservatives
- In office 14 July 2011 – 27 June 2018
- Leader: Andrew RT Davies
- Preceded by: Andrew RT Davies
- Succeeded by: Suzy Davies
Shadow Cabinet and spokesperson roles
Shadow Minister for Mid Wales
In office 18 April 2024 – 5 December 2024
| Leader | Andrew RT Davies |
| Preceded by | James Evans (Note: As Shadow Minister for Mental Health, Wellbeing and Mid Wales) |
| Succeeded by | Role not in use |
Shadow Minister for Rural Affairs
In office 6 April 2017 – 27 June 2018
| Leader | Andrew RT Davies |
| Preceded by | Role not in use |
| Succeeded by | Andrew RT Davies (Note: As Shadow Cabinet Secretary for Environment, Sustainability and Rural Affairs) |
Welsh Conservative Spokesperson on Rural Affairs
In office 13 June 2016 – 6 April 2017
| Leader | Andrew RT Davies |
Shadow Finance Minister
In office 20 July 2011 – 5 May 2016
| Leader | Andrew RT Davies |
| Preceded by | Nick Ramsay |
| Succeeded by | Adam Price (Note: As Shadow Minister for Business, Economy and Finance) |
Shadow Minister for Education and the Welsh Language
In office 27 February 2009 – 5 May 2011
| Leader | Nick Bourne |
| Preceded by | Alun Cairns |
| Succeeded by | Angela Burns |
Shadow Minister for Culture, the Welsh Language and Sport
In office 5 June 2007 – 27 February 2009
| Leader | Nick Bourne |
| Preceded by | Owen John Thomas |
| Succeeded by | Role re-organised |

Member of the Senedd
- Incumbent
- Assumed office 3 May 2007
- Preceded by: Tamsin Dunwoody
- Constituency: Preseli Pembrokeshire (2007–2026); Ceredigion Penfro (2026–present)

Personal details
- Born: Paul Windsor Davies; 1969 (age 56–57) Wales
- Party: Conservative
- Website: www.paul-davies.org.uk

Paul Windsor Davies (born 1969) is a British politician who has served as Member of the Senedd (MS) since 2007, first for Preseli Pembrokeshire and then from 2026 for Ceredigion Penfro. He was Shadow Cabinet Secretary for the Constitution and External Affairs and Welsh Conservative Chief Whip from December 2024.

He served as Leader of the Welsh Conservatives and Leader of the Opposition in Wales from June 2018 to January 2021, resigning after possible breaches of Welsh COVID-19 rules. He had previously been Deputy Leader from 2011 to 2018 and Acting Leader in 2011 and 2018.

== Background ==
Davies grew up in Pontsian. He attended Tregroes Primary School and Llandysul Grammar School, obtaining A levels at Newcastle Emlyn Comprehensive School. Davies now lives in Blaenffos, north Pembrokeshire.

== Professional career ==
On leaving school in 1987 aged 18 Davies started working for Lloyds TSB as a bank clerk based in Haverfordwest. He remained with the bank until his election to the National Assembly in 2007, having risen to become a Business Manager.

== Political career ==
In February 2000, Davies was adopted as the Conservative Party candidate in the Ceredigion by-election; he came in third place in the results having improved the Conservatives' vote. He then fought the seat in the 2001 general election. In the Senedd election of 2003, he fought Preseli Pembrokeshire where he increased the share of the vote from 23% to 30%, cutting the Labour Party's majority to 1,326.

Davies has also held office within the Conservative Party including chairman of Ceredigion Conservative Association and Deputy Chairman of Mid and West Wales Conservatives.

He was first elected to the Senedd in 2007 and was re-elected in May 2011, May 2016 and again in May 2021.

From June 2007 to February 2009 he served as Shadow Minister for Culture, the Welsh Language and Sport. From February 2009 until the Senedd elections in May 2011, Davies held the role of Shadow Minister for Education and the Welsh Language. After his re-election as Senedd Member for Preseli Pembrokeshire at the 2011 elections he briefly held the role of Interim Leader of the Welsh Conservatives, as former Conservative leader Nick Bourne had lost his Mid and West Wales list seat. He served in that post for two months, while a leadership contest was held which saw Andrew RT Davies elected leader of the Welsh Conservatives. He was appointed as Deputy Leader of the Welsh Conservative Senedd Group, and Shadow Minister for Finance in RT Davies' first Shadow Cabinet.

Davies retained this role until after the 2016 Assembly elections, which saw the Conservatives cease to be the official opposition. He was handed the role of Rural Affairs spokesperson. By April 2017, however, the Welsh Tories were once again the largest party, and he therefore became Shadow Minister for Rural Affairs.

Davies introduced the Autism (Wales) Bill to the National Assembly in 2017.

=== Leadership ===
In 2018, Andrew RT Davies stood down as leader of the Welsh Conservatives, after a confrontation with his party group. It was widely reported that his stance on Brexit was a significant factor. Paul Davies again stepped in as interim leader, and announced his intention to run to hold the role. In a vote held from the 15th of August to the 5th of September Paul Davies won against his opponent Suzy Davies, receiving 68.1% of the vote.

Davies was elected Leader of the Welsh Conservatives in September 2018.

He resigned as Leader of the Welsh Conservatives and Leader of the Opposition on 23 January 2021, shortly after he was seen drinking with fellow MSs in the Senedd in December 2020, days after a ban on serving alcohol in pubs was instituted. At the time it was believed this may be a breach of Welsh COVID-19 regulations. In April 2022 Paul Davies was cleared of breaking the Senedd's code of conduct. His predecessor, Andrew RT Davies, replaced him in the role.

=== Post-leadership Senedd Career ===
Davies was re-appointed to the Welsh Shadow Cabinet in April 2024, being appointed Shadow Minister for West Wales. After the resignation of Andrew RT Davies and election of Darren Millar as leader of the Welsh Conservatives, Davies was appointed as Chief Whip and Shadow Cabinet Secretary for the Constitution and External Affairs.

Davies was elected as MS for the Ceredigion Penfro constituency in the 2026 Senedd election.
