= Angela Burns =

British businesswoman and politician

Angela Burns MBE
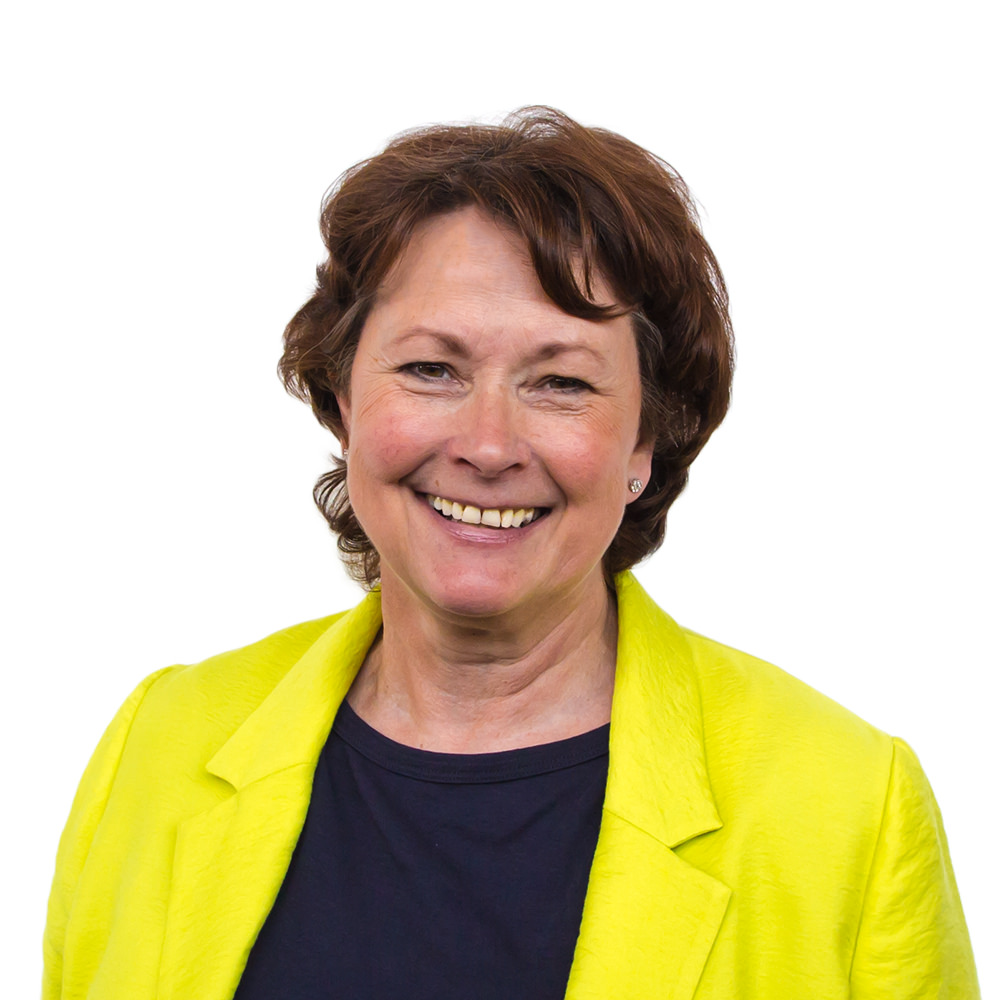
- Burns in 2016

Member of the Senedd for Carmarthenshire West and South Pembrokeshire
- In office 3 May 2007 – 29 April 2021
- Preceded by: Christine Gwyther
- Succeeded by: Samuel Kurtz
- Majority: 1,504 (5.3%)

Personal details
- Party: Conservative
- Spouse: Andrew Burns
- Committees: Chair of Finance Committee 2008–2011, Member of Equality of Opportunity Committee, Children's Committee, Environment & Sustainability Committee. Currently Member of Children, Young People & Education Committee 2010-date
- Portfolio: Commissioner for the National Assembly for Wales

Angela Jane Burns is a British businesswoman and politician who served as an elected Conservative AM/MS for Carmarthen West and South Pembrokeshire from 2007 to 2021.

== Background ==
Burns was from an English family and brought up in several foreign countries. She went into business after leaving school, working for companies such as Waitrose, Thorn EMI and Asda. She later moved to Pembrokeshire with her husband and became active in politics.

In recent times she has become involved with local issues in south Pembrokeshire, particularly the proposed downgrading of the two District Hospitals of Glangwili and Withybush. No such downgrading has occurred.

== Political career ==
She defeated the sitting Labour Party member Christine Gwyther by only 98 votes, and Plaid Cymru's John Dixon by 250 votes, in a very close three-way contest in the 2007 Senedd election. She was the Shadow Minister for Finance and Public Sector Delivery from 11 July 2007 to 16 June 2008, and became the Shadow Minister for Transport and Regeneration on 22 October 2008, followed by a period as shadow education Minister and since 2016 had been the Shadow Cabinet Secretary for Health and Well-Being.

Burns was appointed Member of the Order of the British Empire (MBE) in the 2022 Birthday Honours for political and public service.

== Offices held ==
Senedd
Preceded by Christine Gwyther	Member of the Senedd for Carmarthen West and South Pembrokeshire; 2007–2021	Succeeded by Samuel Kurtz
Political offices
Preceded by (new post)	Shadow Minister for Finance and Public Service Delivery; 2007–2008; 11 July 2007 to 16 June 2008	Succeeded by Nick Ramsay
Preceded by David Melding	Shadow Minister for Transport and Regeneration; 2008– 2011 from 22 October 2008	Succeeded by post reorganised
Preceded by TBC	Shadow Minister for Education; 2011– 2016	Succeeded by Llyr Gruffydd
