= Nick Ramsay =

Welsh politician

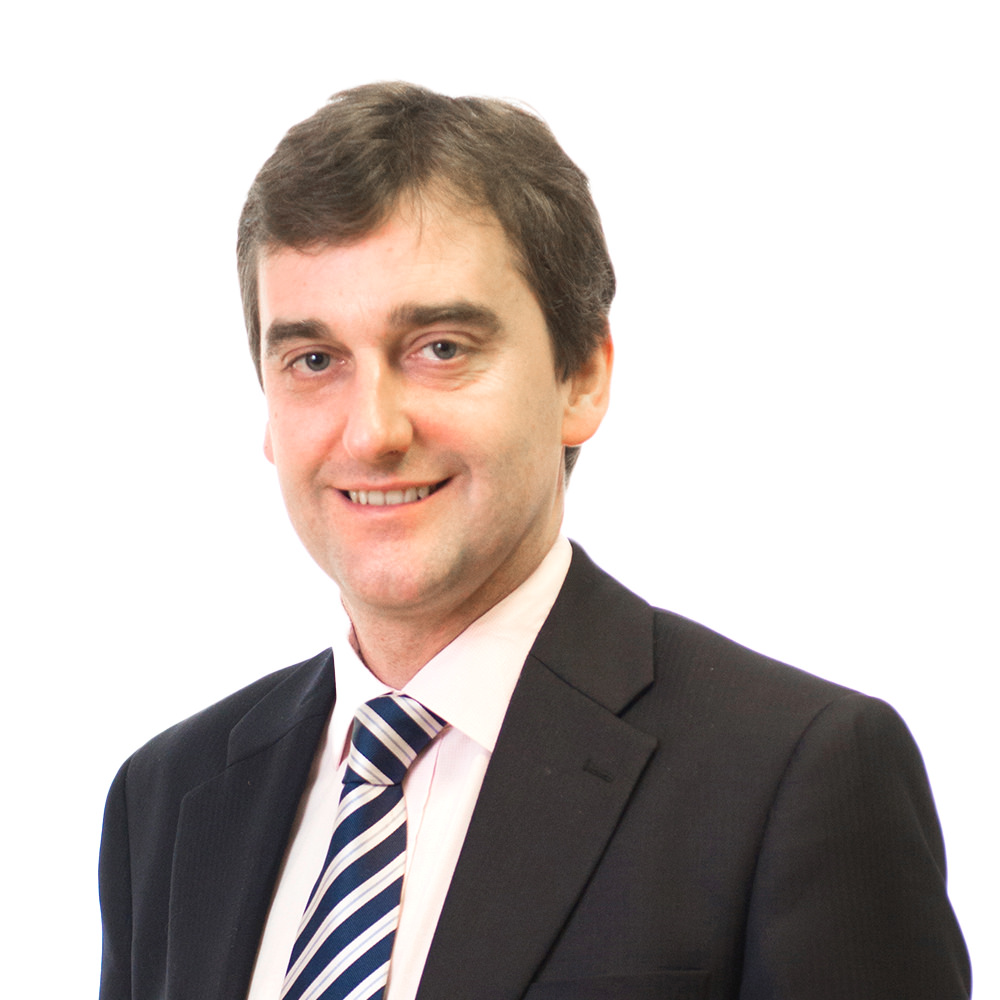

Member of the Senedd for Monmouth
- In office 3 May 2007 – 29 April 2021
- Preceded by: David Davies
- Succeeded by: Peter Fox

Personal details
- Born: 10 June 1975 (age 51) Cwmbran, Torfaen, Wales
- Party: Reform UK (2025 - present)
- Other political affiliations: Welsh Liberal Democrats (2022 – 2025); Independent (2021); Welsh Conservative (until 2021)
- Education: St John's College, Durham; Cardiff University
- Website: www.nickramsay.org.uk

Nick Ramsay (born 10 June 1975) is a British politician who served as the Member of the Senedd (MS) for Monmouth from 2007 to 2021, and has subsequently been a member of multiple political parties from across the political spectrum. Originally a member of the Welsh Conservatives, he served as Shadow Minister of Finance under Conservative Leader in the Senedd, Paul Davies, but lost the position in January 2021 under the new leadership of Andrew RT Davies. Ramsay sat as an independent member before unsuccessfully seeking reelection as an independent in the 2021 Senedd election.

Ramsay defected to the Liberal Democrats in February 2022. He lated changed parties again, joining Reform UK at some point prior to September 2025.

== Early life ==
Nicholas Ramsay was born in 1975 and is originally from Cwmbran. He was educated at Croesyceiliog Comprehensive School and Durham University where he graduated in English and Philosophy. He later gained a Postgraduate Diploma in Applied Linguistics from Cardiff University.

== Professional career ==
Between 1999 and 2001, Ramsay worked as a driving instructor in Monmouthshire and the South Wales Valleys.

== Political career ==
Ramsay contested the Labour Party stronghold of Torfaen at the 2003 Assembly election, and then the UK Parliament constituency of the same name at the 2005 United Kingdom general election. He also served as a Monmouthshire County Councillor for the ward of Mardy, which had previously been in Labour hands for over 20 years.

Ramsay succeeded David T. C. Davies as an Assembly Member for Monmouth, and was appointed shadow minister for Local Government in the Third Assembly Term. Nick stood for leadership of the Conservative group in the summer of 2011 and joined the Conservative Shadow Cabinet as shadow minister for Business, Enterprise, Technology and Science as well as chairing the Business and Enterprise Committee.

After Nick Bourne lost his seat in May 2011, Ramsay stood for leadership of the Welsh Conservative Senedd Group against South Wales Central AM, Andrew RT Davies. Davies was elected leader with 53.1% of the membership vote.

Ramsay joined the shadow cabinet under Conservative Leader, Paul Davies MS, in the position of shadow minister of Finance and to chair the Public Accounts Committee. In January 2021, Andrew RT Davies was named as the new leader of the Welsh Conservatives in the Senedd and sacked Ramsay as finance spokesperson.

On 2 January 2020 it was reported that Ramsay had been suspended from the Welsh Conservatives and his parliamentary group following what was described as a "police incident" at his home the previous evening. He was held in police custody for 24 hours before being released without charge, but continued to be suspended from the party pending an investigation. On 13 February, Ramsay confirmed that he had been reinstated to the Welsh Conservative Party Group in the Senedd and had dropped his legal challenge against the decision by group leader Paul Davies to suspend him. Following a period of nearly seven months Ramsay was reinstated to the Conservative party in July 2020 no further comment was made by the Police or the Conservative party. Ramsay left the Conservative Party in March 2021 and sat as an Independent member.

In 2019 Ramsay had been adopted by the Monmouth Conservative Association as its chosen candidate for the elections to the Senedd (due in 2021) but was deselected in December 2020. He stood as an independent candidate and lost to the Conservative candidate, Peter Fox.

=== S025 ===
In 2008 Ramsay spent much of his time on the Special Assembly Procedure Committee, and in particular the "S025," which re-considered the Robeston Wathen by-pass proposed by the Welsh Assembly Government. These types of Orders and challenges are rare occurrences. The last one which was heard in Parliament was in 1999.

=== Alcohol-related problems ===
In 2011, while a contender for the leadership of the Welsh Conservatives, Ramsay had to apologise after being barred from a pub following a charity pub quiz in aid of Help for Heroes. The landlord is quoted as saying that he resigned his membership of the party over the issue as "Nick Ramsay heckled the quizmaster repeatedly, telling him that his questions were rubbish. He challenged the quizmaster, a local antiques dealer, to bid £100 for a rugby jersey in an auction we held on the same evening for the charity. He was quite rude and objectionable and his comments didn't go down well – I think he'd had a few beers."

In 2012, Ramsay was criticised for missing a committee session; after an evening's drinking in Cardiff at a leaving party for a Labour member of staff at a Cardiff Bay pub before heading into town at closing time for a late city centre bar. He failed to notify the clerk that he was ill until two hours after the meeting was due to start. when an email was received by the clerk from a member of Ramsay's staff to say he had been taken ill during the night. Ramsay was not in the Assembly chamber for the majority of the afternoon's session, but arrived at 5.25pm to vote on a Liberal Democrat motion of no confidence in Health Minister Lesley Griffiths.

In 2014, Ramsay was accused of having been drunk during a debate in the Assembly. The Assembly's Presiding Officer had to launch an investigation after she received a complaint alleging that a Tory AM appeared "drunk" and made "slurred, incoherent and insolent" contributions to a debate on mental health in the Senedd, but he denies being drunk. Ramsay, who also celebrated his birthday that day, had intervened twice during a speech by health minister Prof Mark Drakeford AM, who at one point told him he would pursue the matters raised directly with him outside the confines of the debate. An online clip demonstrated the awkwardness of the debate. Presiding Officer, Dame Rosemary Butler, did not support the claim and no further action was taken.

In 2020, Ramsay was accused of involvement in a further alcohol-related incident when he was seen drinking alcohol on Senedd premises during a period when this was not legal due to coronavirus public health measures.

=== Charitable donation ===
Ramsay criticised the proposed £10,000 pay rise for assembly members prior to the 2016 election and stated that he would donate his pay rise to charity. The Western Mail reported in 2019 that Ramsay had not responded to questions that asked which charity his pay raise had been donated to. The editor of the Monmouthshire Beacon stated that, at a meeting with Ramsay in 2018, Ramsay said he did not wish to make a public announcement at this stage because of the nature of the charity and that the money is tied with an ongoing charitable project which will be announced later in the year. As of March 2019, no announcement had been made.

=== Legal actions against the Conservative Party ===
Ramsay has brought legal action against the Conservative Party on two occasions. The first was against Paul Davies, leader of the Conservative Group in the Senedd, when Davies had suspended him from the group after he was arrested following a ‘police incident’ at his home on New Year's Day 2020 and held in police custody for 24 hours. Eight members of the 11-strong assembly group had supported the suspension. On 13 February, Ramsay confirmed that he had been reinstated to the Welsh Conservative Party Group in the Senedd and had dropped his legal challenge against the decision to suspend him. Davies was ordered to pay legal costs plus nominal damages fee of £2 to Ramsay, according to a High Court order. Ramsay remained suspended from the Conservative Party.

Further legal action followed Monmouth Conservative Association arranging to meet on 23 November to discuss a petition that called for Ramsay's selection as a candidate to be discussed again. Ramsay and his lawyers claimed the move was "unconstitutional" and warned party members could face legal costs and damages. The Party argued that the association believed it was acting within party rules as per their constitution. Ramsay attempted to withdraw his legal challenge at the last minute which meant the High Court hearing went ahead. The judge ordered Ramsay to pay £25,000 in costs to Monmouth Conservative Association. At the virtual hearing at Bristol Civil Justice Centre, Ramsay's injunction application was withdrawn, and a judge said if the application to injunct had been made it would have failed.

In December 2020, Conservative Party members in Monmouth told Ramsay that they did not want him to be their candidate for the May 2021 election. He lost a vote of the constituency's party association and the party opened a candidate selection process.

=== Defection to the Liberal Democrats ===
On 8 February 2022, Ramsay defected to the Liberal Democrats and was announced as a candidate for Monmouthshire County Council in the upcoming local elections. He said: "The Conservative Party is not the party I once joined. They have lost the trust of the people, and are unable to manage our country. They have failed the fundamental test of competence. I can think of little of them with which I agree."

Senedd
Preceded by David Davies	Member of the Senedd for Monmouth; 2007–2021	Succeeded by Peter Fox
Political offices
Preceded by (new post)	Shadow Minister for Local Government and Public Services; 2007–2008; 11 July 2007 to 22 October 2008	Succeeded by Alun Cairns
Preceded by Angela Burns	Shadow Minister for Finance; 2008–2011	Succeeded by ???
Preceded by TBC	Shadow Minister for Business, Enterprise and Technology; 2011–2016	Succeeded by post re-organised
