= Opinion polling for the 2021 Senedd election =

In the run-up to the 2021 Senedd election, various organisations carried out opinion polling to gauge voting intentions. Results of such polls are displayed in this list. Most of the pollsters listed are members of the British Polling Council (BPC) and abide by its disclosure rules.

The date range for these opinion polls was from the 2016 National Assembly for Wales election, held on 5 May 2016, to 6 May 2021 when the election for the newly named Senedd took place and was the first Welsh election which included 16 and 17-year-olds in the electoral franchise. After January 2020 most opinion polls also included this data set to reflect the enfranchisement in the next election.

== Constituency vote ==
The opinion polls below are gauge voting intentions for the 40 single member constituency seats elected through the plurality voting system.

=== Graphical summary ===
The chart below depicts constituency vote opinion polls conducted for the Senedd election.

View source data.

==== Poll results ====
Pollster	Client(s)	Date(s) conducted	Sample size	Lab	Con	Plaid Cymru	Lib Dem	Abolish	Reform UK (Note: Known as the Brexit Party (Plaid Brexit) from 2018 until January 2021.)	Green	UKIP	Other	Lead
2021 election		6 May 2021	–	39.9%	26.1%	20.3%	4.9%	1.6%	1.6%	1.6%	0.8%	3.2%	13.8%
YouGov	ITV Cymru Wales & Cardiff U.	2–4 May 2021	1,071	36%	29%	20%	3%	2%	4%	2%	1%	2%	7%
Savanta ComRes	N/A	29 Apr – 4 May 2021	1,002	36%	28%	18%	6%	3%	3%	–	–	6%	8%
Savanta ComRes	N/A	23–28 Apr 2021	1,002	36%	27%	19%	5%	4%	4%	1%	0%	4%	9%
YouGov	ITV Cymru Wales & Cardiff U.	18–21 Apr 2021	1,142	35%	24%	24%	3%	3%	4%	3%	–	3%	11%
Opinium	Sky News	9–19 Apr 2021	2,005	40%	30%	19%	4%	–	–	–	–	7%	10%
YouGov	ITV Cymru Wales & Cardiff U.	16–19 Mar 2021	1,174	32%	30%	23%	5%	3%	3%	2%	0%	1%	2%
YouGov	Wales Online	19–22 Feb 2021	1,004	33%	28%	22%	4%	3%	4%	4%	1%	0%	5%
ICM	BBC Wales	28 Jan – 21 Feb 2021	1,001	39%	24%	24%	4%	1%	–	1%	2%	4%	15%
		24 Jan 2021	Andrew RT Davies officially becomes leader of the Welsh Conservatives										
YouGov	ITV Cymru Wales & Cardiff U.	11–14 Jan 2021	1,018	34%	26%	22%	4%	–	5%	6%	0%	4%	8%
YouGov	ITV Cymru Wales & Cardiff U.	26–30 Oct 2020	1,013	38%	27%	20%	3%	–	5%	3%	0%	4%	11%
YouGov	ITV Cymru Wales & Cardiff U.	28 Aug – 4 Sep 2020	1,110	34%	29%	24%	3%	2%	4%	3%	0%	1%	5%
YouGov	ITV Cymru Wales & Cardiff U.	29 May – 1 Jun 2020	1,021	34%	31%	22%	5%	1%	3%	3%	0%	1%	3%
Survation	Centre for Welsh Studies	22–31 May 2020	1,051	40%	26%	18%	7%	–	8%	–	–	2%	14%
YouGov	ITV Cymru Wales & Cardiff U.	4–7 Apr 2020	1,008	31%	38%	19%	4%	1%	4%	3%	0%	0%	7%
ICM	BBC Wales	4–22 Feb 2020	1,000	31%	31%	26%	6%	–	2%	2%	2%	1%	Tie
YouGov	ITV Cymru Wales & Cardiff U.	20–26 Jan 2020	1,037	33%	35%	19%	5%	1%	4%	3%	0%	1%	2%
		12 Dec 2019	2019 United Kingdom general election										
YouGov	ITV Cymru Wales & Cardiff U.	6–9 Dec 2019	1,020	33%	31%	18%	7%	1%	7%	3%	0%	0%	2%
YouGov	ITV Cymru Wales & Cardiff U.	25–28 Nov 2019	1,116	32%	26%	20%	7%	1%	11%	4%	0%	0%	6%
YouGov	ITV Cymru Wales & Cardiff U.	31 Oct – 4 Nov 2019	1,136	27%	24%	21%	10%	1%	14%	4%	0%	0%	3%
YouGov	ITV Cymru Wales & Cardiff U.	10–14 Oct 2019	1,032	25%	23%	22%	11%	1%	15%	4%	0%	0%	2%
YouGov	ITV Cymru Wales & Cardiff U.	23–26 Jul 2019	1,071	21%	19%	24%	12%	—	19%	4%	–	2%	3%
YouGov	ITV Cymru Wales & Cardiff U.	16–20 May 2019	1,009	25%	17%	24%	9%	1%	17%	5%	1%	0%	1%
YouGov	ITV Cymru Wales & Cardiff U.	2–5 Apr 2019	1,025	31%	23%	24%	6%	1%	3%	1%	7%	0%	7%
ICM	BBC Wales	7–23 Feb 2019	1,000	34%	23%	27%	7%	–	–	2%	5%	2%	7%
YouGov	ITV Cymru Wales & Cardiff U.	19–22 Feb 2019	1,025	32%	26%	23%	8%	1%	–	3%	7%	2%	6%
Sky Data	Cardiff University	7–14 Dec 2018	1,014	42%	26%	22%	3%	–	–	2%	4%	1%	16%
		6–13 Dec 2018	Mark Drakeford officially becomes leader of Welsh Labour and First Minister										
YouGov	ITV Cymru Wales & Cardiff U.	4–7 Dec 2018	1,024	40%	25%	20%	7%	1%	–	2%	5%	0%	15%
YouGov	ITV Cymru Wales & Cardiff U.	30 Oct – 2 Nov 2018	1,031	38%	28%	19%	6%	1%	–	1%	6%	1%	10%
		28 Sep 2018	Adam Price officially becomes leader of Plaid Cymru										
		6 Sep 2018	Paul Davies officially becomes leader of the Welsh Conservatives										
		10 Aug 2018	Gareth Bennett officially becomes leader of UKIP Wales										
YouGov	ITV Cymru Wales & Cardiff U.	28 Jun – 2 Jul 2018	1,031	38%	28%	21%	6%	1%	–	1%	4%	1%	10%
YouGov	ITV Cymru Wales & Cardiff U.	12–15 Mar 2018	1,015	39%	28%	22%	4%	1%	–	1%	5%	0%	11%
ICM	BBC Wales	8–25 Feb 2018	1,001	40%	22%	24%	6%	–	–	1%	5%	2%	16%
		6 Feb 2018	Alyn and Deeside by-election										
YouGov	ITV Cymru Wales & Cardiff U.	21–24 Nov 2017	1,016	43%	26%	19%	5%	1%	–	2%	4%	1%	17%
		3 Nov 2017	Jane Dodds officially becomes leader of the Welsh Liberal Democrats										
YouGov	ITV Cymru Wales & Cardiff U.	4–7 Sep 2017	1,011	43%	25%	19%	5%	1%	–	1%	4%	0%	18%
		8 Jun 2017	2017 United Kingdom general election										
YouGov	ITV Cymru Wales & Cardiff U.	29–31 May 2017	1,014	42%	26%	19%	6%	1%	–	1%	5%	0%	16%
YouGov	ITV Cymru Wales & Cardiff U.	18–21 May 2017	1,025	40%	27%	20%	6%	0%	–	2%	5%	1%	13%
YouGov	ITV Cymru Wales & Cardiff U.	5–7 May 2017	1,018	33%	33%	20%	7%	1%	–	2%	3%	1%	Tie
YouGov	ITV Cymru Wales & Cardiff U.	19–21 Apr 2017	1,029	29%	30%	22%	8%	1%	–	1%	8%	1%	1%
YouGov	ITV Cymru Wales & Cardiff U.	3–6 Jan 2017	1,034	31%	25%	21%	8%	1%	–	2%	12%	0%	6%
YouGov	ITV Cymru Wales & Cardiff U.	18–21 Sep 2016	1,001	34%	24%	20%	6%	1%	–	2%	13%	0%	10%
YouGov	ITV Cymru Wales & Cardiff U.	30 Jun – 4 Jul 2016	1,010	32%	19%	23%	7%	1%	–	1%	16%	0%	9%
YouGov	ITV Cymru Wales & Cardiff U.	30 May – 2 Jun 2016	1,017	34%	18%	23%	7%	1%	–	2%	15%	0%	11%
2016 election		5 May 2016	–	34.7%	21.2%	20.5%	7.7%	–	–	2.5%	12.5%	1.0%	13.6%

== Regional vote ==
The opinion polls below are gauge voting intentions for the 20 regional list seats elected through the additional member system.

=== Graphical summary ===
The chart below depicts regional vote opinion polls conducted for the next Senedd election.

View source data.

==== Poll results ====
Pollster	Client(s)	Date(s) conducted	Sample size	Lab	Con	Plaid Cymru	Abolish	Lib Dem	Green	Reform UK	UKIP	Other	Lead
2021 election		6 May 2021	–	36.2%	25.1%	20.7%	3.7%	4.3%	4.4%	1.1%	1.6%	2.9%	11.1%
YouGov	ITV Cymru Wales & Cardiff U.	2–4 May 2021	1,071	31%	25%	21%	7%	4%	5%	2%	3%	1%	6%
Savanta ComRes	N/A	29 Apr – 4 May 2021	1,002	32%	25%	19%	6%	5%	5%	3%	–	6%	7%
Savanta ComRes	N/A	23–28 Apr 2021	1,002	31%	24%	21%	8%	5%	3%	3%	–	5%	7%
YouGov	ITV Cymru Wales & Cardiff U.	18–21 Apr 2021	1,142	33%	22%	23%	7%	4%	5%	–	–	6%	10%
Opinium	Sky News	9–19 Apr 2021	2,005	38%	27%	19%	–	4%	5%	–	2%	5%	11%
YouGov	ITV Cymru Wales & Cardiff U.	16–19 Mar 2021	1,174	31%	28%	22%	7%	4%	3%	1%	1%	2% (Note: Including Propel with 1%)	3%
YouGov	ITV Cymru Wales & Cardiff U.	19–22 Feb 2021	1,004	29%	25%	24%	9%	2%	5%	3%	2%	3%	4%
ICM	BBC Wales	28 Jan – 21 Feb 2021	1,001	37%	22%	22%	4%	3%	3%	–	4%	6%	15%
		24 Jan 2021	Andrew RT Davies officially becomes leader of the Welsh Conservatives										
YouGov	ITV Cymru Wales & Cardiff U.	11–14 Jan 2021	1,018	30%	25%	23%	7%	4%	5%	4%	–	1%	5%
YouGov	ITV Cymru Wales & Cardiff U.	26–30 Oct 2020	1,013	33%	24%	20%	7%	4%	4%	5%	–	2%	9%
YouGov	ITV Cymru Wales & Cardiff U.	28 Aug – 4 Sep 2020	1,110	33%	27%	23%	4%	3%	4%	4%	–	2%	6%
YouGov	ITV Cymru Wales & Cardiff U.	29 May – 1 Jun 2020	1,021	32%	28%	24%	4%	5%	4%	3%	–	1%	4%
Survation	Centre for Welsh Studies	22–31 May 2020	1,051	36%	23%	22%	–	7%	–	10%	–	2%	13%
YouGov	ITV Cymru Wales & Cardiff U.	4–7 Apr 2020	1,008	29%	37%	18%	3%	4%	3%	4%	0%	2%	8%
ICM	BBC Wales	4–22 Feb 2020	1,000	31%	29%	25%	–	5%	3%	3%	2%	2%	2%
YouGov	ITV Cymru Wales & Cardiff U.	20–26 Jan 2020	1,037	32%	32%	19%	3%	5%	–	3%	0%	5%	Tie
		12 Dec 2019	2019 United Kingdom general election										
YouGov	ITV Cymru Wales & Cardiff U.	6–9 Dec 2019	1,020	32%	28%	19%	2%	6%	4%	7%	0%	1%	4%
YouGov	ITV Cymru Wales & Cardiff U.	25–28 Nov 2019	1,116	29%	26%	21%	2%	7%	4%	9%	0%	0%	3%
YouGov	ITV Cymru Wales & Cardiff U.	31 Oct – 4 Nov 2019	1,136	23%	23%	21%	4%	9%	5%	13%	1%	1%	Tie
YouGov	ITV Cymru Wales & Cardiff U.	10–14 Oct 2019	1,032	23%	22%	21%	3%	10%	5%	14%	1%	0%	1%
YouGov	ITV Cymru Wales & Cardiff U.	23–26 Jul 2019	1,071	19%	18%	23%	—	12%	4%	17%	–	7%	4%
YouGov	ITV Cymru Wales & Cardiff U.	16–20 May 2019	1,009	21%	12%	22%	3%	7%	8%	23%	1%	1%	1%
YouGov	ITV Cymru Wales & Cardiff U.	2–5 Apr 2019	1,025	28%	20%	22%	3%	5%	3%	6%	5%	2% (Note: Including the Welsh Christian Party with 1%)	6%
ICM	BBC Wales	7–23 Feb 2019	1,000	32%	22%	25%	–	6%	3%	–	6%	6%	7%
YouGov	ITV Cymru Wales & Cardiff U.	19–22 Feb 2019	1,025	29%	24%	23%	4%	6%	4%	–	6%	4% (Note: Including the Socialist Labour Party and Welsh Christian Party with 1%)	5%
Sky Data	Cardiff University	7–14 Dec 2018	1,014	39%	23%	22%	7%	2%	2%	–	4%	1%	16%
		6–13 Dec 2018	Mark Drakeford officially becomes leader of Welsh Labour and First Minister										
YouGov	ITV Cymru Wales & Cardiff U.	4–7 Dec 2018	1,024	36%	24%	20%	5%	4%	4%	–	4%	3% (Note: Including the BNP and Welsh Christian Party with 1%)	12%
YouGov	ITV Cymru Wales & Cardiff U.	30 Oct – 2 Nov 2018	1,031	37%	26%	18%	3%	6%	4%	–	5%	2%	11%
		28 Sep 2018	Adam Price officially becomes leader of Plaid Cymru										
		6 Sep 2018	Paul Davies officially becomes leader of the Welsh Conservatives										
		10 Aug 2018	Gareth Bennett officially becomes leader of UKIP Wales										
YouGov	ITV Cymru Wales & Cardiff U.	28 Jun – 2 Jul 2018	1,031	37%	25%	22%	3%	5%	3%	–	5%	1%	12%
YouGov	ITV Cymru Wales & Cardiff U.	12–15 Mar 2018	1,015	36%	27%	21%	3%	4%	3%	–	6%	1%	9%
ICM	BBC Wales	8–25 Feb 2018	1,001	36%	21%	22%	–	6%	2%	–	8%	3%	14%
		6 Feb 2018	Alyn and Deeside by-election										
YouGov	ITV Cymru Wales & Cardiff U.	21–24 Nov 2017	1,016	38%	27%	18%	2%	5%	3%	–	4%	2% (Note: Including the Communist Party of Britain with 1%)	11%
		3 Nov 2017	Jane Dodds officially becomes leader of the Welsh Liberal Democrats										
YouGov	ITV Cymru Wales & Cardiff U.	4–7 Sep 2017	1,011	40%	23%	19%	3%	5%	3%	–	5%	2% (Note: Including the BNP with 1%)	17%
		8 Jun 2017	2017 United Kingdom general election										
YouGov	ITV Cymru Wales & Cardiff U.	29–31 May 2017	1,014	38%	27%	17%	3%	6%	2%	–	6%	2% (Note: Including the Socialist Labour Party with 1%)	11%
YouGov	ITV Cymru Wales & Cardiff U.	18–21 May 2017	1,025	37%	26%	19%	3%	5%	3%	–	5%	1%	11%
YouGov	ITV Cymru Wales & Cardiff U.	5–7 May 2017	1,018	31%	32%	20%	3%	6%	3%	–	5%	2%	1%
YouGov	ITV Cymru Wales & Cardiff U.	19–21 Apr 2017	1,029	27%	28%	20%	3%	6%	5%	–	9%	2%	1%
YouGov	ITV Cymru Wales & Cardiff U.	3–6 Jan 2017	1,034	28%	22%	20%	4%	7%	2%	–	14%	1%	6%
YouGov	ITV Cymru Wales & Cardiff U.	18–21 Sep 2016	1,001	29%	22%	21%	4%	6%	3%	–	13%	3% (Note: Including the Welsh Christian Party, BNP and Communist Party of Britain with 1%)	7%
YouGov	ITV Cymru Wales & Cardiff U.	30 Jun – 4 Jul 2016	1,010	29%	18%	24%	3%	6%	4%	–	15%	3% (Note: Including the Welsh Christian Party and Communist Party of Britain with 1%)	5%
YouGov	ITV Cymru Wales & Cardiff U.	30 May – 2 Jun 2016	1,017	32%	18%	21%	4%	6%	4%	–	14%	0%	11%
2016 election		5 May 2016	–	31.5%	18.8%	20.8%	4.4%	6.5%	3.0%	–	13.0%	2.1%	10.6%

== Leadership polling ==
At various dates in the run up to the 2021 Senedd election, various organisations carried out opinion polling to gauge the opinions that voters hold towards political leaders. Results of these polls are displayed in this article. The polling companies listed are members of the British Polling Council (BPC) and abide by its disclosure rules.

The date range for these opinion polls is from 2019 to 2021, with the exception of Welsh party leaders where the entire polling history is shown.

Most approval polling in Wales is carried out by YouGov/Cardiff University. A single score is then given to each figure, based on where the most common answer for a leader lies, with 0 representing Strongly Dislike and 10 representing Strongly Like.

=== Welsh party leaders ===
==== Mark Drakeford ====
The following polls asked about voters' opinions on Mark Drakeford, leader of Welsh Labour and First Minister of Wales.

Date from	Date to	Polling organisation/client	Sample size	Question wording	Score (0–10)
16 March 2021	19 March 2021	YouGov	1,174	Like/Dislike	5.7
3 April 2020	7 April 2020	YouGov	1,008	Like/Dislike	4
29 May 2020	1 June 2020	YouGov	1,021	Like/Dislike	5.1
28 August 2020	4 September 2020	YouGov	1,110	Like/Dislike	5.3
19 February 2019	22 February 2019	YouGov	1,025	Like/Dislike	3.9
16 May 2019	20 May 2019	YouGov	1,009	Like/Dislike	3.8
10 October 2019	14 October 2019	YouGov	1,032	Like/Dislike	3.5
31 October 2019	4 November 2019	YouGov	1,136	Like/Dislike	3.7
22 November 2019	25 November 2019	YouGov	1,116	Like/Dislike	3.9
6 December 2019	9 December 2019	YouGov	1,020	Like/Dislike	3.2
12 March 2018	15 March 2018	YouGov	1,015	Like/Dislike	3.8
30 October 2018	2 November 2018	YouGov	1,031	Like/Dislike	4

==== Paul Davies ====
The following polls asked about voters' opinions on Paul Davies, the former leader of the Welsh Conservatives and the former Leader of the Opposition in Wales. He resigned as Leader of the Welsh Conservatives and Leader of the Opposition on 23 January 2021, after it was exposed that he was involved in an incident which possibly broke Welsh COVID-19 regulations in December 2020. Andrew RT Davies became the new leader of the Welsh Conservatives and Leader of the Opposition in Wales on 24 January 2021.

Date from	Date to	Polling organisation/client	Sample size	Question wording	Score (0–10)
3 April 2020	7 April 2020	YouGov	1,008	Like/Dislike	4
29 May 2020	1 June 2020	YouGov	1,021	Like/Dislike	3.7
28 August 2020	4 September 2020	YouGov	1,110	Like/Dislike	3.7
19 February 2019	22 February 2019	YouGov	1,025	Like/Dislike	3.5
16 May 2019	20 May 2019	YouGov	1,009	Like/Dislike	3
10 October 2019	14 October 2019	YouGov	1,032	Like/Dislike	2.8
31 October 2019	4 November 2019	YouGov	1,136	Like/Dislike	4
22 November 2019	25 November 2019	YouGov	1,116	Like/Dislike	3.4
6 December 2019	9 December 2019	YouGov	1,020	Like/Dislike	3.0
30 October 2018	2 November 2018	YouGov	1,031	Like/Dislike	3.7

==== Adam Price ====
The following polls asked about voters' opinions on Adam Price, leader of Plaid Cymru.

Date from	Date to	Polling organisation/client	Sample size	Question wording	Score (0–10)
3 April 2020	7 April 2020	YouGov	1,008	Like/Dislike	4.9
29 May 2020	1 June 2020	YouGov	1,021	Like/Dislike	4.8
28 August 2020	4 September 2020	YouGov	1,110	Like/Dislike	4.7
19 February 2019	22 February 2019	YouGov	1,025	Like/Dislike	4.6
16 May 2019	20 May 2019	YouGov	1,009	Like/Dislike	3.9
10 October 2019	14 October 2019	YouGov	1,032	Like/Dislike	3.6
31 October 2019	4 November 2019	YouGov	1,136	Like/Dislike	4.2
22 November 2019	25 November 2019	YouGov	1,116	Like/Dislike	4.4
6 December 2019	9 December 2019	YouGov	1,020	Like/Dislike	4.0
30 October 2018	2 November 2018	YouGov	1,031	Like/Dislike	4.3

==== Jane Dodds ====
The following polls asked about voters' opinions on Jane Dodds, the leader of the Welsh Liberal Democrats.

Date from	Date to	Polling organisation/client	Sample size	Question wording	Score (0–10)
16 May 2019	20 May 2019	YouGov	1,009	Like/Dislike	3.4
10 October 2019	14 October 2019	YouGov	1,032	Like/Dislike	3.7
31 October 2019	4 November 2019	YouGov	1,136	Like/Dislike	4.2
22 November 2019	25 November 2019	YouGov	1,116	Like/Dislike	3.4
6 December 2019	9 December 2019	YouGov	1,020	Like/Dislike	3.2
30 October 2018	2 November 2018	YouGov	1,031	Like/Dislike	3.8

==== Mark Reckless ====
The following polls asked about voters' opinions on Mark Reckless, leader of the Brexit Party.

Date from	Date to	Polling organisation/client	Sample size	Question wording	Score (0–10)
16 May 2019	20 May 2019	YouGov	1,009	Like/Dislike	2.6
10 October 2019	14 October 2019	YouGov	1,032	Like/Dislike	2.8
31 October 2019	4 November 2019	YouGov	1,136	Like/Dislike	2.8
22 November 2019	25 November 2019	YouGov	1,116	Like/Dislike	2.4
6 December 2019	9 December 2019	YouGov	1,020	Like/Dislike	2.5

==== Neil Hamilton ====
The following polls asked about voters' opinions on Neil Hamilton, leader of UKIP.

Date from	Date to	Polling organisation/client	Sample size	Question wording	Score (0–10)
10 October 2019	14 October 2019	YouGov	1,032	Like/Dislike	2.2

=== UK party leaders ===
==== Boris Johnson ====
The following polls asked about voters' opinions on Boris Johnson, leader of the Conservative Party and prime minister of the United Kingdom.

Date from	Date to	Polling organisation/client	Sample size	Question wording	Score (0–10)
16 March 2021	19 March 2021	YouGov	1,174	Like/Dislike	3.9
3 April 2020	7 April 2020	YouGov	1,008	Like/Dislike	5.3
29 May 2020	1 June 2020	YouGov	1,021	Like/Dislike	4.1
28 August 2020	4 September 2020	YouGov	1,110	Like/Dislike	3.9
10 October 2019	14 October 2019	YouGov	1,032	Like/Dislike	4
31 October 2019	4 November 2019	YouGov	1,136	Like/Dislike	4
22 November 2019	25 November 2019	YouGov	1,116	Like/Dislike	3.9
6 December 2019	9 December 2019	YouGov	1,020	Like/Dislike	3.8

==== Keir Starmer ====
The following polls asked about voters' opinions on Keir Starmer, the leader of the Labour Party and Leader of the Opposition.

Date from	Date to	Polling organisation/client	Sample size	Question wording	Score (0–10)
29 May 2020	1 June 2020	YouGov	1,021	Like/Dislike	5.6
28 August 2020	4 September 2020	YouGov	1,110	Like/Dislike	5.1

==== Ed Davey ====
The following polls asked about voters' opinions on Ed Davey, the leader of the Liberal Democrats.

Date from	Date to	Polling organisation/client	Sample size	Question wording	Score (0–10)
28 August 2020	4 September 2020	YouGov	1,110	Like/Dislike	3.7

==== Nigel Farage ====
The following polls asked about voters' opinions on Nigel Farage, the leader of the Brexit Party.

Date from	Date to	Polling organisation/client	Sample size	Question wording	Score (0–10)
16 May 2019	20 May 2019	YouGov	1,009	Like/Dislike	3.7
10 October 2019	14 October 2019	YouGov	1,032	Like/Dislike	3.1
31 October 2019	4 November 2019	YouGov	1,136	Like/Dislike	3.1
22 November 2019	25 November 2019	YouGov	1,116	Like/Dislike	2.9
6 December 2019	9 December 2019	YouGov	1,020	Like/Dislike	2.8

==== Siân Berry ====
The following polls asked about voters' opinions on Siân Berry, co-leader of the Green Party.

Date from	Date to	Polling organisation/client	Sample size	Question wording	Score (0–10)
16 May 2019	20 May 2019	YouGov	1,009	Like/Dislike	4.2
10 October 2019	14 October 2019	YouGov	1,032	Like/Dislike	3.6
31 October 2019	4 November 2019	YouGov	1,136	Like/Dislike	3.9
22 November 2019	25 November 2019	YouGov	1,116	Like/Dislike	4.0
6 December 2019	9 December 2019	YouGov	1,020	Like/Dislike	3.9

==== Jonathan Bartley ====
The following polls asked about voters' opinions on Jonathan Bartley, co-leader of the Green Party.

Date from	Date to	Polling organisation/client	Sample size	Question wording	Score (0–10)
16 May 2019	20 May 2019	YouGov	1,009	Like/Dislike	3.6
10 October 2019	14 October 2019	YouGov	1,032	Like/Dislike	3.2
31 October 2019	4 November 2019	YouGov	1,136	Like/Dislike	4.3
22 November 2019	25 November 2019	YouGov	1,116	Like/Dislike	3.9
6 December 2019	9 December 2019	YouGov	1,020	Like/Dislike	3.6

=== Approval ratings for former party leaders ===
==== Jeremy Corbyn ====
The following polls asked about voters' opinions on Jeremy Corbyn, the former leader of the Labour Party.

Date from	Date to	Polling organisation/client	Sample size	Question wording	Score (0–10)
16 May 2019	20 May 2019	YouGov	1,009	Like/Dislike	3
10 October 2019	14 October 2019	YouGov	1,032	Like/Dislike	3
31 October 2019	4 November 2019	YouGov	1,136	Like/Dislike	3.4
22 November 2019	25 November 2019	YouGov	1,116	Like/Dislike	3.8
6 December 2019	9 December 2019	YouGov	1,020	Like/Dislike	3.7

==== Jo Swinson ====
The following polls asked about voters' opinions on Jo Swinson, the former leader of the Liberal Democrats.

Date from	Date to	Polling organisation/client	Sample size	Question wording	Score (0–10)
10 October 2019	14 October 2019	YouGov	1,032	Like/Dislike	3.5
31 October 2019	4 November 2019	YouGov	1,136	Like/Dislike	3.3
22 November 2019	25 November 2019	YouGov	1,116	Like/Dislike	3.3
6 December 2019	9 December 2019	YouGov	1,020	Like/Dislike	3.0

=== Topical polling ===
==== Coronavirus handling ====
The following polls have asked people how well they think key figures have handled the coronavirus pandemic: very well, fairly well, fairly badly, very badly, or don't know. They are then provided with a Total Well or Total Badly figure.

Date(s) conducted	Polling organisation/client	Sample size	Mark Drakeford			Matt Hancock			Boris Johnson			Rishi Sunak			Vaughan Gething		
Date(s) conducted	Polling organisation/client	Sample size	Total Well	Total Badly	Net	Total Well	Total Badly	Net	Total Well	Total Badly	Net	Total Well	Total Badly	Net	Total Well	Total Badly	Net
28 Aug – 4 Sep	YouGov/Cardiff University	1,110	57	22	35	24	48	-24	34	56	-22	50	25	25	35	26	9
29 May – 1 Jun	YouGov/Cardiff University	1,021	49	25	24	29	47	-18	37	57	-20	51	23	28	32	27	5
3 Apr – 7 Apr	YouGov/Cardiff University	1,008	30	23	7	50	22	28	63	29	34	55	14	41	29	18	11

=== Average popularity ===
The following averages are taken from the above breakdown of individual figures' popularity. Note for some figures polling exists prior to 2018 which is not shown here. Some figures may only have a small number of surveys.

Figure	Average Score (0–10)	2020 Average Score (0–10)
Keir Starmer	5.35	5.35
Adam Price	4.34	4.8
Mark Drakeford	4.018	4.8
Boris Johnson	4.014	4.433
Siân Berry	3.92	
Jonathan Bartley	3.72	
Ed Davey	3.7	3.7
Jane Dodds	3.617	
Jeremy Corbyn	3.38	
Jo Swinson	3.275	
Paul Davies	3.18	3.8
Nigel Farage	3.12	
Mark Reckless	2.62	
Neil Hamilton	2.2	

== Seat projections ==
Professor Roger Scully of Cardiff University's Wales Governance Centre provides seat projections based on individual opinion polls at regular intervals on his blog, known as Elections in Wales.

Pollster	Client(s)/Publisher(s)	Date(s) conducted	Sample size	Lab	Con	Plaid Cymru	Abolish	Lib Dem	Reform UK	Green	UKIP	Other	Majority
2021 election		6 May 2021	–	30	16	13	0	1	0	0	0	0	1 short
YouGov	ITV Cymru Wales & Cardiff U.	18–21 Apr 2021	1,142	27	14	15	3	1	0	–	–	–	4 short
Opinium	Sky News	9–19 Apr 2021	2,005	29	19	10	–	1	–	–	1	–	2 short
YouGov	ITV Cymru Wales & Cardiff U.	16–19 Mar 2021	1,174	22	19	14	4	1	0	–	–	–	9 short
YouGov	ITV Cymru Wales & Cardiff U.	19–22 Feb 2021	1,004	24	16	14	5	1	0	–	–	–	7 short
ICM	BBC Wales	28 Jan – 21 Feb 2021	1,001	30	13	15	–	1	–	–	1	–	1 short
		24 Jan 2021	Andrew RT Davies officially becomes leader of the Welsh Conservatives										
YouGov	ITV Cymru Wales & Cardiff U.	11–14 Jan 2021	1,018	26	16	15	2	1	0	–	–	–	5 short
YouGov	ITV Cymru Wales & Cardiff U.	26–30 Oct 2020	1,013	28	16	11	4	1	0	–	–	–	3 short
YouGov	ITV Cymru Wales & Cardiff U.	28 Aug – 4 Sep 2020	1,110	25	19	15	–	1	0	–	–	–	6 short
YouGov	ITV Cymru Wales & Cardiff U.	29 May – 1 Jun 2020	1,021	25	19	15	–	1	0	–	–	–	6 short
Survation	Centre for Welsh Studies	22–31 May 2020	1,051	29	13	12	–	1	5	–	–	–	2 short
YouGov	ITV Cymru Wales & Cardiff U.	4–7 Apr 2020	1,008	23	26	10	–	1	0	–	–	–	5 short
ICM	BBC Wales	4–22 Feb 2020	1,000	21	20	18	–	1	0	–	–	–	10 short
YouGov	ITV Cymru Wales & Cardiff U.	20–26 Jan 2020	1,037	24	22	13	–	1	0	–	–	–	7 short
		12 Dec 2019	2019 United Kingdom general election										
YouGov	ITV Cymru Wales & Cardiff U.	6–9 Dec 2019	1,020	25	19	11	–	1	4	–	–	–	6 short
YouGov	ITV Cymru Wales & Cardiff U.	25–28 Nov 2019	1,116	25	17	12	–	1	5	–	–	–	6 short
YouGov	ITV Cymru Wales & Cardiff U.	31 Oct – 4 Nov 2019	1,136	18	18	15	–	2	7	–	–	–	Tie
YouGov	ITV Cymru Wales & Cardiff U.	10–14 Oct 2019	1,032	18	14	13	–	6	9	–	–	–	13 short
YouGov	ITV Cymru Wales & Cardiff U.	23–26 Jul 2019	1,071	17	11	15	–	7	10	–	–	–	14 short
YouGov	ITV Cymru Wales & Cardiff U.	16–20 May 2019	1,009	20	7	13	–	2	13	5	–	–	11 short
YouGov	ITV Cymru Wales & Cardiff U.	2–5 Apr 2019	1,025	23	15	16	–	1	4	–	1	–	8 short
ICM	BBC Wales	7–23 Feb 2019	1,000	25	14	19	–	1	–	–	1	–	6 short
YouGov	ITV Cymru Wales & Cardiff U.	19–22 Feb 2019	1,025	23	17	16	–	2	–	–	2	–	8 short
Sky Data	Cardiff University	7–14 Dec 2018	1,014	29	13	14	2	1	–	–	1	–	2 short
		6–13 Dec 2018	Mark Drakeford officially becomes leader of Welsh Labour and First Minister										
YouGov	ITV Cymru Wales & Cardiff U.	4–7 Dec 2018	1,024	29	16	13	–	1	–	–	1	–	2 short
YouGov	ITV Cymru Wales & Cardiff U.	30 Oct – 2 Nov 2018	1,031	29	18	11	–	1	–	–	1	–	2 short
		28 Sep 2018	Adam Price officially becomes leader of Plaid Cymru										
		6 Sep 2018	Paul Davies officially becomes leader of the Welsh Conservatives										
		10 Aug 2018	Gareth Bennett officially becomes leader of UKIP Wales										
YouGov	ITV Cymru Wales & Cardiff U.	28 Jun – 2 Jul 2018	1,031	28	15	15	–	1	–	–	1	–	3 short
YouGov	ITV Cymru Wales & Cardiff U.	12–15 Mar 2018	1,015	28	17	13	–	1	–	–	1	–	3 short
ICM	BBC Wales	8–25 Feb 2018	1,001	30	13	15	–	1	–	–	1	–	1 short
		6 Feb 2018	Alyn and Deeside by-election										
YouGov	ITV Cymru Wales & Cardiff U.	21–24 Nov 2017	1,016	30	18	10	–	1	–	–	1	–	1 short
		3 Nov 2017	Jane Dodds officially becomes leader of the Welsh Liberal Democrats										
YouGov	ITV Cymru Wales & Cardiff U.	4–7 Sep 2017	1,011	31	16	11	–	1	–	–	1	–	2
		8 Jun 2017	2017 United Kingdom general election										
YouGov	ITV Cymru Wales & Cardiff U.	19–21 Apr 2017	1,029	21	18	14	–	2	–	–	5	–	10 short
YouGov	ITV Cymru Wales & Cardiff U.	3–6 Jan 2017	1,034	22	14	14	–	2	–	–	8	–	9 short
YouGov	ITV Cymru Wales & Cardiff U.	18–21 Sep 2016	1,001	26	14	12	–	1	–	–	7	–	5 short
YouGov	ITV Cymru Wales & Cardiff U.	30 Jun – 4 Jul 2016	1,010	25	11	15	–	1	–	–	8	–	6 short
YouGov	ITV Cymru Wales & Cardiff U.	30 May – 2 Jun 2016	1,017	27	11	14	–	1	–	–	7	–	4 short
2016 election		5 May 2016	–	29	11	12	–	1	–	–	7	–	2 short

== See also ==
- Opinion polling for the 2024 United Kingdom general election in Wales
- Opinion polling for the 2021 Scottish Parliament election
- Opinion polling for the 2022 Northern Ireland Assembly election
- Opinion polling for the 2016 National Assembly for Wales election
