= 2018 in United Kingdom politics and government =

== Events ==
=== January ===
- 8 January –
  - James Brokenshire resigns as Northern Ireland Secretary on health grounds due to an upcoming lung operation.
  - Prime Minister Theresa May announces a Cabinet reshuffle.
- 12 January – US President Donald Trump scraps a planned visit to the UK, blaming his predecessor, Barack Obama, for a "bad deal" on the new embassy due to be opened in London, despite the fact it was agreed under the administration of George W. Bush.
- 17 January – By 317 to 299 votes, the Conservatives reject a Labour amendment to keep the Charter of Fundamental Rights of the European Union.
- 18 January – Jacob Rees-Mogg is elected chair of the European Research Group.
- 21 January – The UK Independence Party's National Executive Committee (NEC) delivers a vote of no confidence in its leader, Henry Bolton, following a recent controversy involving his girlfriend.
- 30 January – A leaked government paper shows that Brexit will damage the UK economy no matter what kind of deal is agreed, with up to 8% of GDP growth lost within fifteen years.

=== February ===
- 6 February – The Alyn and Deeside by-election is held.
- 17 February – UKIP members vote to dismiss party leader Henry Bolton after controversy over racist text messages sent by his partner.
- 27 February – The Labour Party appoints transgender model Munroe Bergdorf as an LGBT adviser to Shadow Secretary of State for Women and Equalities Dawn Butler.

=== March ===
- 1 March – Former Mayor of London, Ken Livingstone, is suspended from the Labour Party indefinitely, amid claims of anti-semitism.
- 5 March – A Sinn Féin delegation meets the EU's chief negotiator Michel Barnier in Brussels about the border between Northern Ireland and the Republic of Ireland due to Brexit.
- 6 March – Ex-UKIP leader Henry Bolton announces he will create a new political party called "OneNation" that would "campaign unceasingly for our full independence from the EU", and "mirror some of the changes that I sought to bring to UKIP".
- 7 March
  - Saudi Arabian Crown Prince Mohammed bin Salman starts a three-day visit to the UK, amid protest concerns from Prime Minister Theresa May.
  - The EU rejects Theresa May's proposal for "mutual recognition" of standards between the UK and EU as part of a post-Brexit trade relationship, while also ruling out British membership of EU regulators such as the European Medicines Agency after Brexit.
- 13 March – The government's next fiscal statement, which is now called the Spring Statement is published.
- 14 March – The UK government calls for an urgent meeting of the UN Security Council to discuss the poisoning of Sergei Skripal and Yulia Skripal on 4 March. Theresa May announces that 23 Russian diplomats will be expelled from the UK after Russia fails to respond to claims of involvement.
- 15 March – The Space Industry Act 2018 becomes law, giving UK spaceports the legal framework to function.
- 18–19 March – Foreign Secretary Boris Johnson dismisses claims from Russian EU ambassador, Vladimir Chizhov, who said that Porton Down may have been the source of the nerve agent. It is reported that experts from the Organisation for the Prohibition of Chemical Weapons will arrive on 19 March to test samples of the substance.
- 23 March – Labour Party leader Jeremy Corbyn sacks Owen Smith from the Shadow Cabinet, for calling for a second EU referendum contrary to official Labour Party position. Smith is replaced by Tony Lloyd.
- 24 March – Plaid Cymru announces that if elected, they will hold an independence referendum for Wales by 2030.
- 31 March – The government receives a request from the Russian Embassy to visit Yulia Skripal in hospital after the poisoning on 4 March.

=== April ===
- 2 April – The Director of Public Prosecutions in England and Wales, Alison Saunders, announces that she will step down after her contract ends in October.
- 6 April – The sugary drinks tax comes into force throughout the UK.
- 14 April – The UK Independence Party leadership election is decided with Gerard Batten being elected.
- 17 April – Theresa May apologises to Caribbean leaders at Downing Street over the Windrush generation controversy.
- 18 April – Theresa May suffers two defeats in the House of Lords on her flagship Brexit legislation. In the first, the Lords vote by 348 to 225 to force negotiation of a Customs Union between the EU and the UK. In the second, the Lords vote by 314 to 217 on an amendment limiting the ability of ministers to use secondary legislation to water down existing EU rights when those rights get transferred to UK law.
- 20 April – Commonwealth leaders announce that the Prince of Wales will succeed Elizabeth II as Head of the Commonwealth.
- 21 April – Carwyn Jones announces that he will stand down as First Minister of Wales in the Autumn, after nearly nine years in the role.
- 24 April – The first statue of a woman in Parliament Square is unveiled, that of suffragette Millicent Fawcett.
- 29 April – Amber Rudd resigns as Home Secretary after misleading the Home Affairs Select Committee on deportation targets.
- 30 April – Sajid Javid is appointed as the new Home Secretary, becoming the first person from an Asian background to hold one of the Great Offices of State in the UK.

=== May ===
- 3 May – Local elections are held across the United Kingdom. Also held is the West Tyrone by-election.
- 4 May – Órfhlaith Begley, a 26-year-old solicitor, retains West Tyrone for Sinn Féin in the previous day's by-election.
- 8 May – Three votes take place in the House of Lords on the issue of Brexit. In the first, peers vote to remove the exit date of 29 March 2019 from the withdrawal bill, to give more time for negotiations. In the second, they vote to retain UK membership of EU agencies such as Euratom. In the third, they vote to give MPs a chance to vote on remaining in the European Economic Area, which would enable the UK to access the single market.
- 9 May – The Foreign Secretary Boris Johnson reaffirms the UK's commitment to the Iranian nuclear agreement after President Trump announces that the U.S. will pull out.
- 18 May – A deputy leadership election is begun by the Scottish National Party.
- 28 May – A deputy leadership election is held by the Scottish Labour Party. It is won by MP Lesley Laird.
- 11 May
  - The campaign group Leave.EU is fined £70,000 for breaching electoral law in the 2016 EU Referendum.
  - Theresa May agrees to appoint a panel to help oversee the Grenfell fire inquiry, following pressure from campaigners.
  - First Minister Carwyn Jones confirms he will quit the Welsh Assembly at the 2021 general election.
- 16 May – Theresa May loses a 15th vote on the Brexit Bill, as the House of Lords votes, by 294 to 244, to create a watchdog for enforcing EU environmental standards.
- 21 May – Former Mayor of London Ken Livingstone resigns from the Labour party, having been suspended since 2016 over allegations of anti-Semitism.
- 25 May – Cabinet Secretary for Health and Sport Vaughan Gething launches a consultation to ban smoking in outdoor grounds of hospitals, schools, and playgrounds within Wales from summer 2019.
- 30 May – Co-Leader of the Green Party, Caroline Lucas announces that she will step down from her position in September.

=== June ===
- 1 June
  - The Green Party of England and Wales leadership election begins.
  - The SNP deputy leadership election is concluded, with Keith Brown being elected.
- 5 June – The UK government approves a controversial plan for a third runway at Heathrow Airport.
- 13 June – By 327 votes to 126, the House of Commons rejects a Lords amendment to the EU Withdrawal Bill, which had attempted to keep the UK in the European Economic Area after Brexit. Other changes made to the bill are also overturned, including a requirement to negotiate a customs union with the EU.
- 14 June – A by-election is held in Lewisham East. The seat is held for Labour by Janet Daby.
- 17 June – The UK government announces an extra £20bn for the NHS by 2023, a budget increase of 3.4% a year. However, this is less than the average 3.7% the NHS had over the previous 70 years. The plan is also criticized by former Treasury officials, who cast doubt on the idea of a "Brexit dividend" and say the extra public spending will require higher taxes or public borrowing.
- 18 June – The leadership election for UKIP Wales begins.
- 20 June – A rebellion by Conservative MPs is defeated, as the House of Commons votes by 319 to 303 against a "meaningful vote", which could have given MPs the power to stop Britain leaving the EU without a deal.
- 28 June – The Washington Post reports that former UKIP leader Nigel Farage is being investigated by U.S. Special Counsel Robert Mueller’s team for his ties to Donald Trump's associates and Russian colluders.
- 29 June –The leadership election for the Welsh Conservatives begins.

=== July ===
- 6 July – Theresa May secures approval from the cabinet to negotiate a soft Brexit. This includes proposals to create a new UK-EU free trade area, the ending of free movement but with a new "mobility framework" for UK and EU citizens, and the ending of the jurisdiction of the European Court of Justice but with the UK paying regard to its decisions in areas where common rules are in force.
- 8 July – David Davis resigns as Brexit secretary. Following this, one more DExEU minister, Steve Baker also resigns.
- 9 July
  - Dominic Raab is appointed as Brexit secretary after David Davis' resignation.
  - Boris Johnson resigns as Foreign Secretary, saying that the "dream is dying, suffocated by needless self-doubt". He is replaced by Jeremy Hunt.
- 10 July – Two vice chairs of the Conservative Party, Maria Caulfield and Ben Bradley, resign in protest at Theresa May's Chequers Brexit compromise plan.
- 11 July – The UK government publishes its White Paper, The future relationship between the United Kingdom and the European Union.
- 12–15 July – American President Donald Trump makes his first state visit to the United Kingdom, meeting with Queen Elizabeth II and Prime Minister Theresa May.
- 13 July – Business minister Andrew Griffiths resigns over a sexting scandal, and two days before the publication of a Sunday Mirror story about the scandal.
- 16 July – The UK government confirms that it will accept all four demands by the European Research Group. Downing Street insists they are all consistent with its recent Brexit white paper, but critics say the Chequers agreement of 6 July is dead. MPs vote by 305 to 302 in favour of the amendment.
- 17 July
  - Brexit campaign group Vote Leave is fined and referred to police for breaking electoral law.
  - In a vote of 307 to 301, MPs reject a proposal to form a customs union if the UK and EU do not agree on a trade deal. However, in a separate vote of 305 to 301, they back an amendment to keep the UK in the European medicines regulatory network.
- 19 July – Conservative MP Philip Davies submits a letter of no confidence in Theresa May to the chair of the backbench 1922 Committee, saying he has "lost trust" in her ability to deliver the EU referendum result.
- 26 May – Michel Barnier, the EU's chief Brexit negotiator, rejects the UK's proposal to collect customs duties on its behalf.

=== August ===
- 10 August – Gareth Bennett defeats Caroline Jones in the UKIP Wales leadership election.
- 29 August – Former SNP leader Alex Salmond resigns from the party to avoid internal division amid sexual misconduct claims, which he denies.
- 30 August – Labour MP Frank Field resigns the Labour whip over "excuses for the party’s toleration of antisemitism". He retains his party membership, describing himself as an "independent Labour MP".
- 31 August – The Green Party of England and Wales leadership election concludes. The winners are Jonathan Bartley and Siân Berry who will job share.

=== September ===
- 3 September – Latest available data shows that SNP membership has overtaken the Conservatives across the UK for the first time, pushing the party of government into third place.
- 6 September – Paul Davies defeats Suzy Davies (no relation) in the Welsh Conservatives leadership election.
- 21 September – Theresa May demands new proposals from the EU to break the "impasse" after her Chequers plan was rejected by EU leaders. The pound falls by its highest amount of the year so far.
- 25 September – Labour Party delegates approve a motion that could pave the way for a second EU referendum if MPs are unable to agree over a Brexit deal.
- 26 September – It is reported that MP David Rutley has been appointed as a Minister of Food (the first since 1958) to ensure the protection of food supplies through the Brexit process.

=== October ===
- 29 October – Chancellor Philip Hammond says the era of austerity "is finally coming to an end" as he delivers his third budget.

=== November ===
- 9 November – Transport minister Jo Johnson resigns from the Cabinet and calls for a fresh referendum on Brexit, including an option to remain in the EU.
- 14 November – Theresa May secures Cabinet support for her Brexit Withdrawal Agreement after "a long, detailed and impassioned debate".
- 15 November – Brexit Secretary Dominic Raab resigns, stating that he "cannot in good conscience support the terms proposed for our deal with the EU". Further resignations follow: Work and Pensions Secretary Esther McVey, Junior Brexit minister Suella Braverman, Northern Ireland minister Shailesh Vara, and Parliamentary Private Secretary Anne-Marie Trevelyan. The pound falls sharply in response.
- 16 November – Steve Barclay is named as the new Brexit Secretary, while Amber Rudd returns to the Cabinet as Secretary of State for Work and Pensions.
- 25 November – After more than 18 months of negotiations, EU leaders endorse the Brexit withdrawal agreement.
- 29 November – Labour MP Lloyd Russell-Moyle reveals that he is HIV positive, becoming the first politician to announce his HIV status in the House of Commons, and only the second to publicly disclose they are living with the condition.
- 30 November – Sam Gyimah resigns as Minister of State for Universities, Science, Research and Innovation, saying that he cannot vote for Theresa May's Brexit deal.

=== December ===
- 4 December – In a vote of 311–293, MPs find the UK Government in contempt of parliament for failing to publish its full legal advice on Theresa May's Brexit deal. They also back Dominic Grieve's amendment to hand back control of Brexit to Parliament if the deal is defeated.
- 5 December – The Attorney General's full legal advice on the Brexit deal is published.
- 10 December – The government delays the parliamentary vote on approving the European Union Withdrawal Agreement and Political Declaration, postponing it from the following day to 21 January 2019. The pound falls to its lowest level in 18 months.
- 12 December – Theresa May wins a vote of no confidence on her leadership of the Conservative Party by 200–117.

== Deaths ==
- 11 January – Ednyfed Hudson Davies, 88, Welsh politician, MP for Conway (1966–1970) and Caerphilly (1979–1983).
- 15 January – Olive Nicol, Baroness Nicol, 94, British politician and life peer, Member of the House of Lords (since 1983).
- 18 January – Arthur Davidson, 89, British politician, complications from a fall.
- 3 March – Ian Stewart, Baron Stewartby, 82, British politician and numismatist.
- 17 March – Nicholas Edwards, Baron Crickhowell, 84, British politician, Secretary of State for Wales (1979–1987).
- 18 March – Ivor Richard, Baron Richard, 85, British politician and diplomat, Lord Privy Seal (1997–98), ambassador to UN, MP for Barons Court (1964–1974).
- 30 March – Josie Farrington, Baroness Farrington of Ribbleton, 77, British politician, life peer (since 1994).
- 29 April – Michael Martin, Baron Martin of Springburn, 72, British politician, MP (1979–2009) and Speaker of the House of Commons (2000–2009).
- 1 May – Peter Temple-Morris, 80, British politician and life peer, MP for Leominster (1974–2001).
- 12 May – Dame Tessa Jowell, 70, English politician, brain cancer.
- 8 June –
  - Pat Lally, 92, Scottish politician, Lord Provost of Glasgow (1996–1999).
  - Thomas Stuttaford, 87, British doctor and politician, MP (1970–1974).
- 9 June – George Grubb, 82, British politician, Lord Provost of Edinburgh (2007–2012).
- 9 July – Peter Carington, 6th Baron Carrington, 99, British politician, Foreign Secretary (1979–1982), Secretary General of NATO (1984–1988).
- 10 July – John Laird, Baron Laird, 74, Northern Irish politician, member of the House of Lords (since 1999).
- 27 July – George Cunningham, 87, British politician, MP (1970–1983).
- 31 July – Sir Alex Fergusson, 69, British politician, Presiding Officer of the Scottish Parliament (2007–2011).
- 2 August – Tom Cox, 88, British politician, MP for Wandsworth Central (1970–1974) and Tooting (1974–2005).
- 15 August – Martin Brandon-Bravo, 86, British politician, MP (1983–1992).
- 18 August –
  - Sir Peter Tapsell, 88, British politician, MP (1959–1964, 1966–2015) and Father of the House of Commons (2010–2015).
  - John Townend, 84, British politician, MP (1979–2001).
- 21 August – Donald Mackay, Baron Mackay of Drumadoon, 72, Scottish lawyer and politician, Lord Advocate (1995–1997).
- 31 August – Peter Mond, 4th Baron Melchett, 71, British environmentalist and politician.
- 5 September – Robert Coulter, 88, Northern Irish politician, MLA for Antrim North (1998–2011).
- 10 October – Denzil Davies, 80, Welsh politician and MP (1970–2005).
- 13 October – Patricia Hollis, Baroness Hollis of Heigham, 77, politician.
- 3 December – Toby Jessel, 84, politician, MP (1970–1997).
- 15 December – David Myles, 93, Scottish politician, MP for Banffshire (1979–1983).
- 22 December – Paddy Ashdown, 77, British politician, Leader of the Liberal Democrats (1988–1999).
