= Opinion polling for the 2021 Scottish Parliament election =

In the run-up to the 2021 Scottish Parliament election, various organisations conducted opinion polls to gauge voting intentions. Results of such polls are displayed in this list. Most of the pollsters listed were members of the British Polling Council (BPC) and abided by its disclosure rules.

The date range for these opinion polls is from the previous Scottish Parliament election, held on 5 May 2016, to the 2021 election, held on 6 May 2021.

== Graphical summary ==
This graph shows opinion poll results with trendlines for the 30-day moving averages. The SNP led in all polls, with the Conservatives and Labour coming second or third behind them.

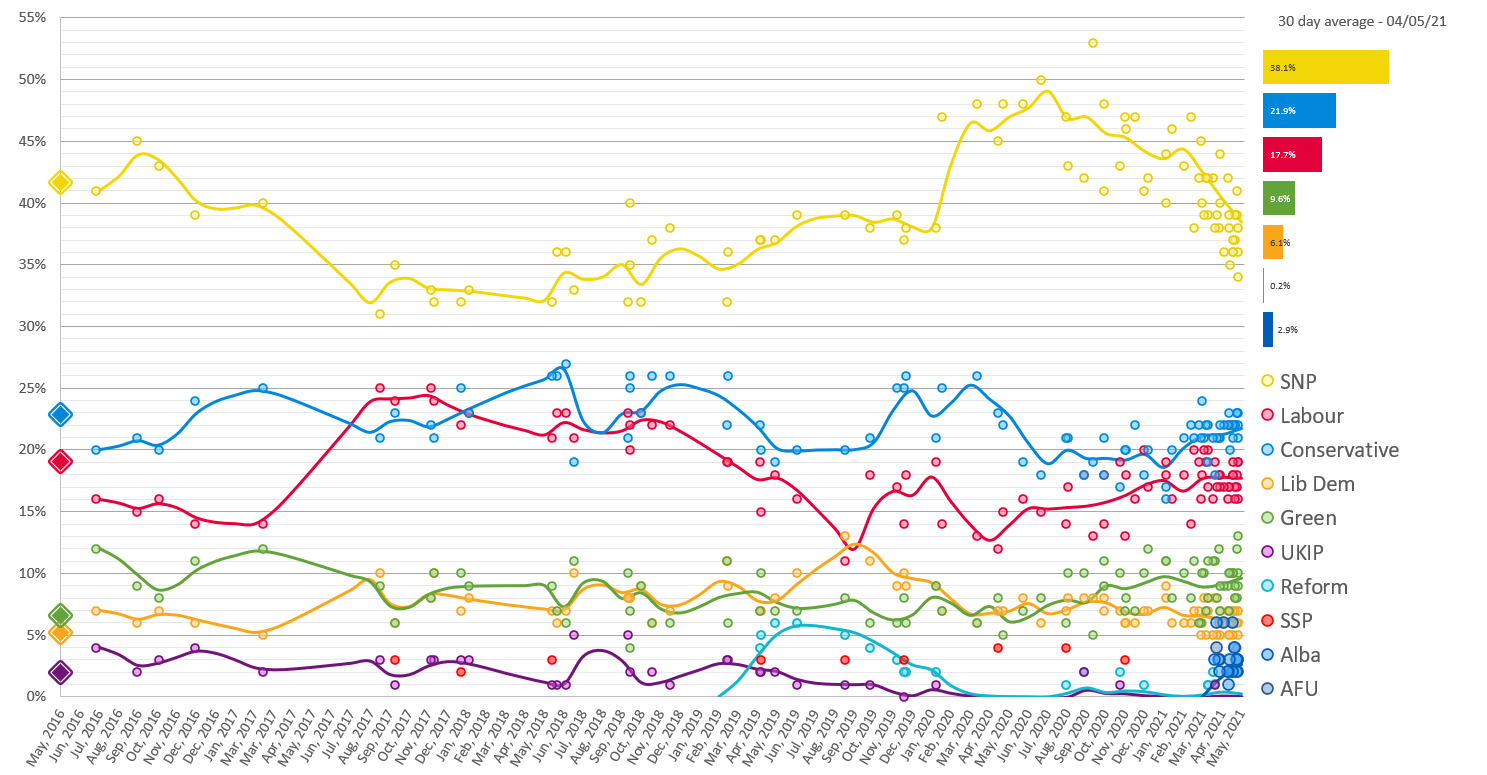

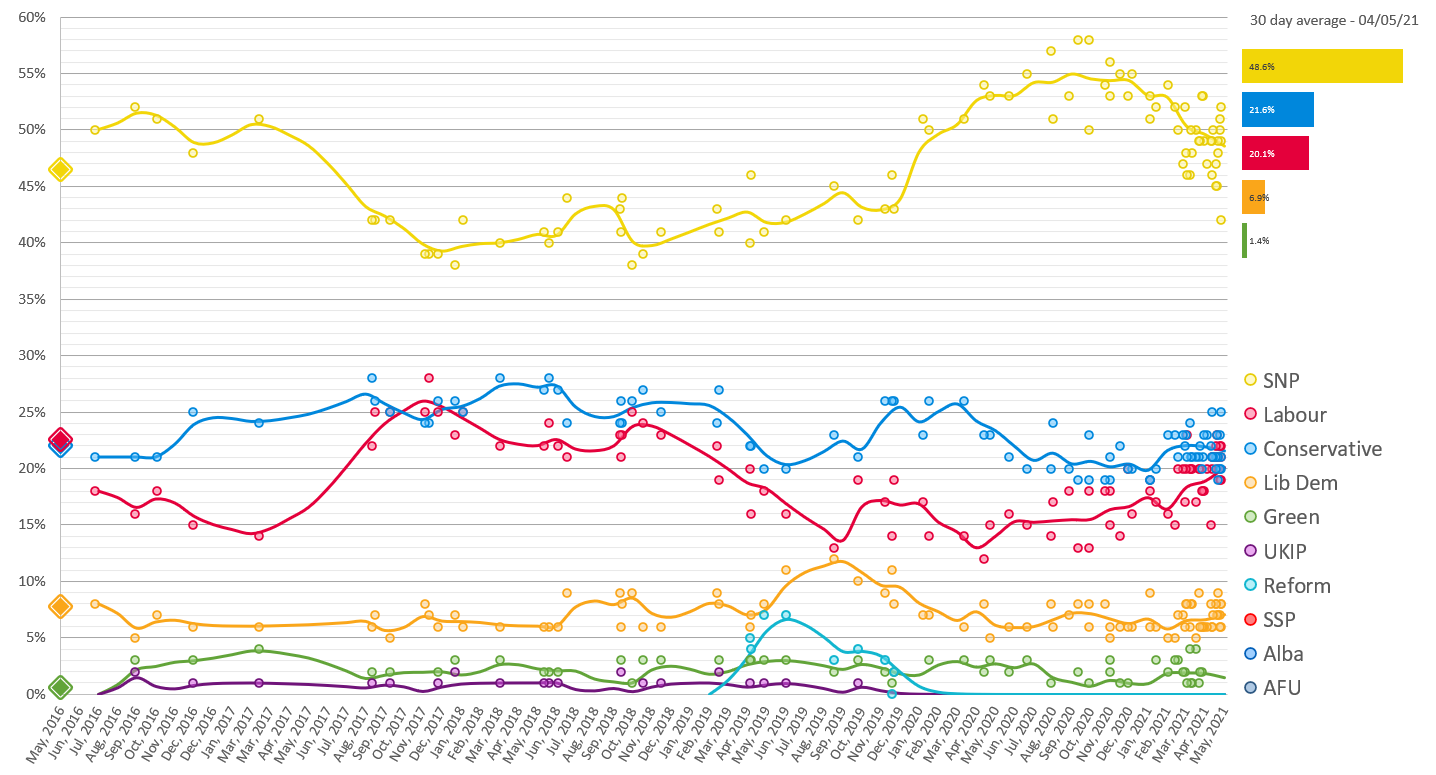

Key

SNP – Scottish National Party
Conservative – Scottish Conservatives
Labour – Scottish Labour
Lib Dem – Scottish Liberal Democrats
Green – Scottish Greens
UKIP – UK Independence Party
Reform – Reform UK
SSP – Scottish Socialist Party
Alba – Alba Party
AFU – All for Unity

== Constituency vote ==
The opinion polls below are gauge voting intentions for the 73 single member constituency seats elected through the plurality voting system.

=== Graphical summary ===
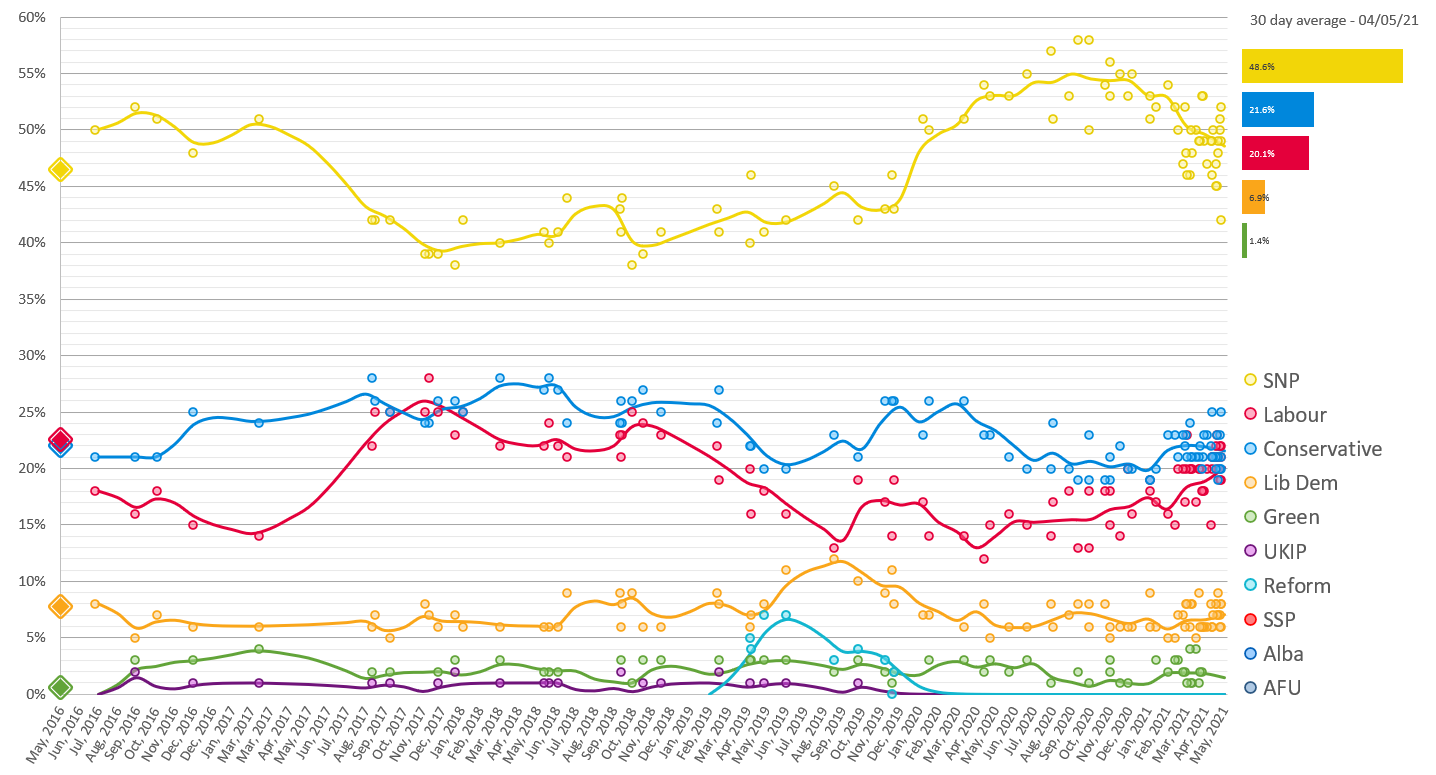

=== Poll results ===
| Pollster | Client | Date(s) conducted | Sample size | SNP | Con | Lab | Lib Dem | Green | UKIP | Ref UK | Other | Lead |
|---|---|---|---|---|---|---|---|---|---|---|---|---|
| 2021 Scottish Parliament election | | 6 May 2021 | – | 47.7% | 21.9% | 21.6% | 6.9% | 1.3% | 0.0% | – | 0.6% | 25.8% |
| | | 4 May 2021 | BBC Scotland leaders' debate between Sarwar, Rennie, Ross, Sturgeon and Harvie | | | | | | | | | |
| YouGov | The Times | 2–4 May 2021 | 1,144 | 52% | 20% | 19% | 6% | 2% | – | – | 1% | 32% |
| Survation | The Courier | 30 Apr – 4 May 2021 | 1,008 | 49% | 21% | 21% | 8% | 1% | – | – | 1% | 28% |
| Savanta ComRes | The Scotsman | 30 Apr – 4 May 2021 | 1,001 | 42% | 25% | 22% | 8% | – | – | – | 3% | 17% |
| Ipsos MORI | STV News | 30 Apr – 3 May 2021 | 1,502 | 50% | 20% | 22% | 6% | 2% | – | – | 1% | 28% |
| Opinium | Sky News | 28 Apr – 3 May 2021 | 1,015 | 51% | 23% | 19% | 7% | – | – | – | – | 28% |
| Panelbase | The Sunday Times | 28–30 Apr 2021 | 1,096 | 48% | 21% | 20% | 7% | 3% | – | – | 1% | 27% |
| BMG | The Herald | 27–30 Apr 2021 | 1,023 | 49% | 19% | 21% | 9% | – | – | – | – | 28% |
| | | 27 Apr 2021 | Channel 4 News leaders' debate between Sarwar, Rennie, Ross, Sturgeon and Harvie | | | | | | | | | |
| Savanta ComRes | The Scotsman | 23–27 Apr 2021 | 1,001 | 45% | 23% | 23% | 7% | – | – | – | 1% | 22% |
| Survation | GMB | 23–26 Apr 2021 | 1,008 | 47% | 21% | 21% | 8% | – | – | – | 2% | 26% |
| Panelbase | Scot Goes Pop | 21–26 Apr 2021 | 1,075 | 45% | 20% | 22% | 8% | 4% | – | – | – | 23% |
| Survation | The Sunday Post | 20–22 Apr 2021 | 1,037 | 50% | 21% | 21% | 7% | 1% | – | – | 1% | 29% |
| Savanta ComRes | The Scotsman | 16–20 Apr 2021 | 1,001 | 46% | 25% | 20% | 6% | – | – | – | 3% | 21% |
| YouGov | The Times | 16–20 Apr 2021 | 1,204 | 49% | 21% | 21% | 6% | 1% | – | – | 2% | 28% |
| | | 13 Apr 2021 | STV leaders' debate between Sarwar, Rennie, Ross, Sturgeon and Harvie | | | | | | | | | |
| Panelbase | Believe in Scotland | 9–12 Apr 2021 | 1,002 | 47% | 23% | 20% | 6% | 4% | – | – | – | 24% |
| Lord Ashcroft | N/A | 7–19 Apr 2021 | 2,017 | 49% | 22% | 15% | 8% | 5% | – | – | – | 27% |
| Savanta ComRes | The Scotsman | 2–7 Apr 2021 | 1,007 | 49% | 23% | 18% | 6% | – | – | – | 3% | 26% |
| Opinium | Sky News | 1–6 Apr 2021 | 1,023 | 53% | 21% | 18% | 6% | – | – | – | 1% | 32% |
| Ipsos MORI | STV News | 30 Mar – 4 Apr 2021 | 1,038 | 53% | 20% | 18% | 6% | 2% | – | – | 1% | 33% |
| Panelbase | The Sunday Times | 30 Mar – 1 Apr 2021 | 1,009 | 49% | 22% | 20% | 6% | 2% | – | – | – | 27% |
| | | 30 Mar 2021 | BBC Scotland leaders' debate between Sarwar, Rennie, Ross, Sturgeon and Slater | | | | | | | | | |
| Survation | The Courier | 29–30 Mar 2021 | 1,000 | 49% | 21% | 20% | 9% | 1% | – | – | – | 28% |
| | | 26 Mar 2021 | Former first minister Alex Salmond launches the Alba Party | | | | | | | | | |
| Find Out Now | Daily Express | 23–26 Mar 2021 | 1,022 | 50% | 21% | 17% | 5% | 4% | – | 1% | 1% | 29% |
| YouGov | The Times | 19–22 Mar 2021 | N/A | 50% | 24% | 17% | 5% | 2% | – | – | 2% | 26% |
| BMG | The Herald | 16–19 Mar 2021 | 1,021 | 48% | 21% | 20% | 8% | 1% | – | – | 1% | 27% |
| Survation | The Courier | 11–18 Mar 2021 | 1,515 | 50% | 21% | 20% | 8% | 1% | – | – | – | 29% |
| Opinium | Sky News | 11–16 Mar 2021 | 1,096 | 46% | 24% | 20% | 6% | 4% | – | – | 1% | 22% |
| Survation | Scotland in Union | 9–12 Mar 2021 | 1,011 | 46% | 21% | 23% | 8% | 1% | – | – | 1% | 23% |
| Savanta ComRes | The Scotsman | 5–10 Mar 2021 | 1,009 | 48% | 23% | 20% | 8% | – | – | – | 2% | 25% |
| YouGov | The Times | 4–8 Mar 2021 | 1,100 | 52% | 22% | 17% | 6% | 2% | – | – | 1% | 30% |
| Panelbase | The Sunday Times | 3–5 Mar 2021 | 1,013 | 47% | 23% | 20% | 7% | 2% | – | – | 1% | 24% |
| | | 27 Feb 2021 | Anas Sarwar is elected leader of Scottish Labour | | | | | | | | | |
| Survation | Daily Record | 24–25 Feb 2021 | 1,011 | 50% | 21% | 20% | 7% | 3% | – | – | 2% | 29% |
| Ipsos MORI | STV News | 15–21 Feb 2021 | 1,031 | 52% | 23% | 15% | 5% | 3% | – | – | 2% | 29% |
| Savanta ComRes | The Scotsman | 4–9 Feb 2021 | 1,002 | 50% | 23% | 19% | 6% | – | – | – | 2% | 27% |
| Panelbase | The Sunday Times | 19–22 Jan 2021 | 1,059 | 52% | 20% | 17% | 6% | 3% | – | – | – | 32% |
| Survation | Scot Goes Pop | 11–13 Jan 2021 | 1,020 | 51% | 19% | 19% | 9% | – | – | – | – | 32% |
| Savanta ComRes | The Scotsman | 8–13 Jan 2021 | 1,016 | 49% | 20% | 20% | 8% | – | – | – | 4% | 29% |
| | | 6 Jan 2021 | The Brexit Party is re-registered as Reform UK | | | | | | | | | |
| Savanta ComRes | The Scotsman | 11–15 Dec 2020 | 1,013 | 52% | 19% | 19% | 7% | – | – | – | 3% | 33% |
| Survation | N/A | 4–9 Dec 2020 | 1,010 | 53% | 20% | 20% | 6% | 1% | – | – | – | 33% |
| Ipsos MORI | STV News | 20–26 Nov 2020 | 1,006 | 55% | 22% | 14% | 6% | 1% | – | – | 1% | 33% |
| Panelbase | Scot Goes Pop | 5–11 Nov 2020 | 1,020 | 53% | 21% | 18% | 5% | 3% | – | – | <1% | 32% |
| YouGov | N/A | 6–10 Nov 2020 | 1,089 | 56% | 19% | 15% | 6% | 2% | – | – | – | 37% |
| Survation | N/A | 28 Oct – 3 Nov 2020 | 1,071 | 54% | 19% | 18% | 8% | – | – | – | 2% | 35% |
| Ipsos MORI | STV News | 2–9 Oct 2020 | 1,045 | 58% | 19% | 13% | 8% | 1% | – | – | 2% | 39% |
| Savanta ComRes | N/A | 9 Oct 2020 | 1,003 | 50% | 23% | 18% | 6% | – | – | – | 2% | 27% |
| JL Partners | Politico | 17–21 Sep 2020 | 1,016 | 58% | 19% | 13% | 8% | 2% | – | – | <1% | 39% |
| Survation | N/A | 2–7 Sep 2020 | 1,018 | 53% | 20% | 18% | 7% | – | – | – | 2% | 33% |
| Savanta ComRes | N/A | 6–13 Aug 2020 | 1,008 | 51% | 24% | 17% | 6% | – | – | – | 2% | 27% |
| YouGov | The Times | 6–10 Aug 2020 | 1,142 | 57% | 20% | 14% | 8% | 1% | – | – | 1% | 37% |
| | | 5 Aug 2020 | Douglas Ross becomes leader of the Scottish Conservatives | | | | | | | | | |
| Panelbase | The Sunday Times | 30 Jun – 3 Jul 2020 | 1,026 | 55% | 20% | 15% | 6% | 3% | – | – | <1% | 35% |
| Panelbase | Scot Goes Pop | 1–5 Jun 2020 | 1,022 | 53% | 21% | 16% | 6% | 3% | – | – | <1% | 32% |
| Panelbase | Wings Over Scotland | 1–5 May 2020 | 1,086 | 53% | 23% | 15% | 5% | 3% | – | – | 1% | 30% |
| YouGov | N/A | 24–27 Apr 2020 | 1,095 | 54% | 23% | 12% | 8% | 2% | – | – | 1% | 31% |
| Panelbase | The Sunday Times | 24–26 Mar 2020 | 1,023 | 51% | 26% | 14% | 6% | 3% | – | – | <1% | 25% |
| | | 14 Feb 2020 | Jackson Carlaw is elected leader of the Scottish Conservatives | | | | | | | | | |
| Panelbase | Scot Goes Pop | 28–31 Jan 2020 | 1,016 | 50% | 26% | 14% | 7% | 3% | – | – | <1% | 24% |
| Survation | Progress Scotland | 20–22 Jan 2020 | 1,019 | 51% | 23% | 17% | 7% | – | – | – | 1% | 28% |
| | | 12 Dec 2019 | 2019 United Kingdom general election | | | | | | | | | |
| Panelbase | The Sunday Times | 3–6 Dec 2019 | 1,020 | 43% | 26% | 19% | 8% | 2% | – | 2% | <1% | 17% |
| YouGov | The Times | 29 Nov – 3 Dec 2019 | 1,002 | 46% | 26% | 14% | 11% | 1% | – | 0% | 0% (Note: Change UK on 0%.) | 20% |
| Panelbase | The Sunday Times | 20–22 Nov 2019 | 1,009 | 43% | 26% | 17% | 9% | 2% | – | 3% | <1% | 17% |
| Panelbase | The Sunday Times | 9–11 Oct 2019 | 1,003 | 42% | 21% | 19% | 10% | 3% | <1% | 4% | <1% | 21% |
| YouGov | The Times | 29 Aug – 3 Sep 2019 | 1,059 | 45% | 23% | 13% | 12% | 2% | – | 3% | 1% | 22% |
| | | 29 Aug 2019 | Shetland by-election | | | | | | | | | |
| | | 1 Aug 2019 | Lorna Slater is elected co-leader of the Scottish Greens alongside Patrick Harvie | | | | | | | | | |
| Panelbase | The Sunday Times | 18–20 Jun 2019 | 1,024 | 42% | 20% | 16% | 11% | 3% | <1% | 7% | <1% (Note: Change UK on less than 1%.) | 22% |
| | | 23 May 2019 | 2019 European Parliament election | | | | | | | | | |
| Panelbase | The Sunday Times | 14–17 May 2019 | 1,021 | 41% | 20% | 18% | 8% | 3% | 1% | 7% | 1% (Note: Change UK on 1%.) | 21% |
| YouGov | The Times | 24–26 Apr 2019 | 1,029 | 46% | 22% | 16% | 7% | 3% | – | 4% | 1% | 24% |
| Panelbase | The Sunday Times | 18–24 Apr 2019 | 1,018 | 40% | 22% | 20% | 6% | 3% | 1% | 5% | 2% (Note: Change UK on 2%.) | 18% |
| Panelbase | Wings Over Scotland | 28 Feb – 6 Mar 2019 | 1,002 | 41% | 27% | 19% | 8% | 3% | 2% | – | <1% | 14% |
| Survation | Scottish Daily Mail | 1–4 Mar 2019 | 1,011 | 43% | 24% | 22% | 9% | – | – | – | 2% | 19% |
| Panelbase | The Sunday Times | 30 Nov – 5 Dec 2018 | 1,028 | 41% | 25% | 23% | 6% | 3% | 1% | – | <1% | 16% |
| Panelbase | Constitutional Commission | 2–7 Nov 2018 | 1,050 | 39% | 27% | 24% | 6% | 3% | 1% | – | <1% | 12% |
| Survation | Daily Record | 18–21 Oct 2018 | 1,017 | 38% | 26% | 25% | 9% | 1% | – | – | 0% | 12% |
| Survation/SNP | N/A | 3–5 Oct 2018 | 1,013 | 44% | 24% | 23% | 8% | – | – | – | 1% | 20% |
| Panelbase | The Sunday Times | 28 Sep – 4 Oct 2018 | 1,024 | 41% | 26% | 21% | 6% | 3% | 2% | – | <1% | 15% |
| Survation | The Sunday Post | 28 Sep – 2 Oct 2018 | 1,036 | 43% | 24% | 23% | 9% | – | – | – | 2% | 19% |
| Survation | Daily Record | 5–10 Jul 2018 | 1,004 | 44% | 24% | 21% | 9% | – | – | – | 3% | 20% |
| Panelbase | Wings Over Scotland | 21–27 Jun 2018 | 1,018 | 41% | 27% | 22% | 6% | 2% | 1% | – | <1% | 14% |
| Panelbase | The Sunday Times | 8–13 Jun 2018 | 1,021 | 40% | 28% | 24% | 6% | 2% | <1% | – | <1% | 12% |
| YouGov | The Times | 1–5 Jun 2018 | 1,075 | 41% | 27% | 22% | 6% | 2% | 1% | – | 1% | 14% |
| Panelbase | The Sunday Times | 23–28 Mar 2018 | 1,037 | 40% | 28% | 22% | 6% | 3% | <1% | – | <1% | 12% |
| Survation | Daily Record | 24–28 Jan 2018 | 1,029 | 42% | 25% | 25% | 6% | – | – | – | 2% | 17% |
| YouGov | The Times | 12–16 Jan 2018 | 1,002 | 38% | 26% | 23% | 7% | 3% | 2% | – | 0% | 12% |
| Panelbase | Wings Over Scotland | 15–20 Dec 2017 | 1,022 | 39% | 26% | 25% | 6% | 2% | <1% | – | <1% | 13% |
| Survation | The Sunday Post | 1–5 Dec 2017 | 1,006 | 39% | 24% | 28% | 7% | – | – | – | 2% | 11% |
| Survation | Daily Record | 27–30 Nov 2017 | 1,017 | 39% | 24% | 25% | 8% | – | – | – | 3% | 14% |
| | | 18 Nov 2017 | Richard Leonard is elected leader of Scottish Labour | | | | | | | | | |
| YouGov | The Times | 2–5 Oct 2017 | 1,135 | 42% | 25% | 25% | 5% | 2% | 1% | – | 0% | 17% |
| Survation | Scottish Daily Mail | 8–12 Sep 2017 | 1,016 | 42% | 26% | 25% | 7% | – | – | – | 2% | 16% |
| Panelbase | The Sunday Times | 31 Aug – 7 Sep 2017 | 1,021 | 42% | 28% | 22% | 6% | 2% | <1% | – | <1% | 14% |
| | | 8 Jun 2017 | 2017 United Kingdom general election | | | | | | | | | |
| | | 4 May 2017 | 2017 Scottish local elections | | | | | | | | | |
| YouGov | The Times | 9–14 Mar 2017 | 1,028 | 51% | 24% | 14% | 6% | 4% | 1% | – | 1% | 27% |
| YouGov | The Times | 24–29 Nov 2016 | 1,134 | 48% | 25% | 15% | 6% | 3% | 1% | – | 0% | 23% |
| BMG | N/A | 28 Sep – 4 Oct 2016 | 1,010 | 51% | 21% | 18% | 7% | – | – | – | 3% | 30% |
| YouGov | The Times | 29–31 Aug 2016 | 1,039 | 52% | 21% | 16% | 5% | 3% | 2% | – | 0% | 31% |
| Survation | Scottish Daily Mail | 24–28 Jun 2016 | 1,055 | 50% | 21% | 18% | 8% | – | – | – | 4% | 29% |
| 2016 Scottish Parliament election | | 5 May 2016 | – | 46.5% | 22.0% | 22.6% | 7.8% | 0.6% | – | – | 0.5% | 23.9% |

== Regional vote ==
The opinion polls below are gauge voting intentions for the 56 regional list seats elected through the additional member system.

=== Graphical summary ===
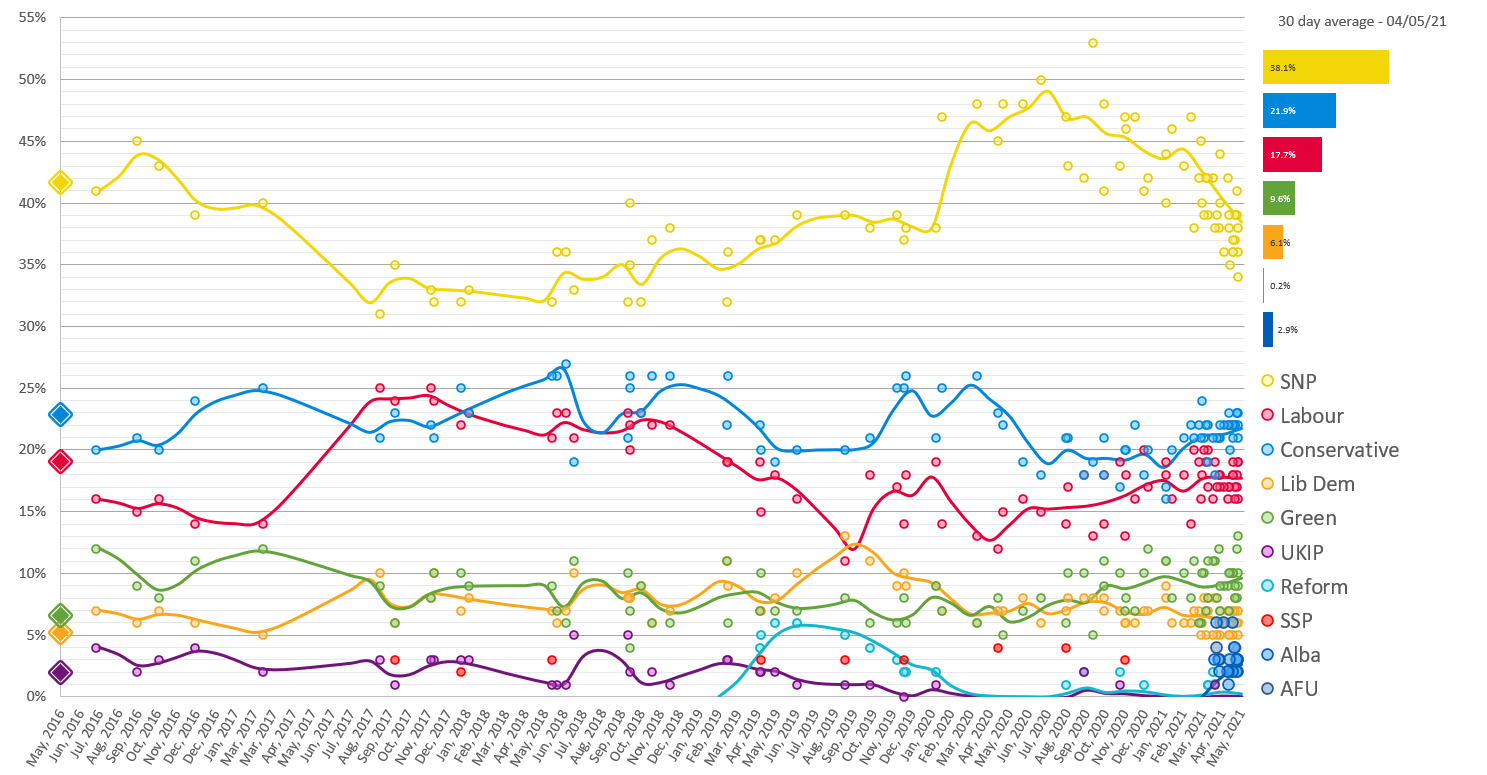

=== Poll results ===
| Pollster | Client | Date(s) conducted | Sample size | SNP | Con | Lab | Green | Lib Dem | Alba | UKIP | Ref UK | SSP | Other | Lead |
|---|---|---|---|---|---|---|---|---|---|---|---|---|---|---|
| 2021 Scottish Parliament election | | 6 May 2021 | – | 40.3% | 23.5% | 17.9% | 8.1% | 5.1% | 1.7% | 0.1% | 0.2% | – | 3.0% (Note: All for Unity on 0.9%, Scottish Family Party on 0.6%, Freedom Alliance on 0.2%, independents on 0.1%, others on 1.2%.) | 16.8% |
| | | 4 May 2021 | BBC Scotland leaders' debate between Sarwar, Rennie, Ross, Sturgeon and Harvie | | | | | | | | | | | |
| YouGov | The Times | 2–4 May 2021 | 1,144 | 38% | 22% | 16% | 13% | 5% | 3% | 0% | 0% | – | 3% (Note: All for Unity on 1%.) | 16% |
| Survation | The Courier | 30 Apr – 4 May 2021 | 1,008 | 36% | 21% | 19% | 10% | 7% | 3% | – | – | – | – | 15% |
| Savanta ComRes | The Scotsman | 30 Apr – 4 May 2021 | 1,001 | 34% | 23% | 19% | 9% | 6% | 2% | – | – | – | – | 11% |
| Ipsos MORI | STV News | 30 Apr – 3 May 2021 | 1,502 | 39% | 23% | 18% | 12% | 4% | 2% | 0% | 0% | – | 2% | 16% |
| Opinium | Sky News | 28 Apr – 3 May 2021 | 1,015 | 41% | 23% | 17% | 8% | 6% | 3% | – | – | – | – | 18% |
| Panelbase | The Sunday Times | 28–30 Apr 2021 | 1,096 | 39% | 22% | 16% | 8% | 7% | 4% | – | – | – | 4% (Note: All for Unity on 2%.) | 17% |
| BMG | The Herald | 27–30 Apr 2021 | 1,023 | 37% | 22% | 17% | 9% | 8% | 4% | – | – | – | – | 15% |
| | | 27 Apr 2021 | Channel 4 News leaders' debate between Sarwar, Rennie, Ross, Sturgeon and Harvie | | | | | | | | | | | |
| Savanta ComRes | The Scotsman | 23–27 Apr 2021 | 1,001 | 36% | 22% | 19% | 10% | 5% | 2% | – | – | – | 8% | 14% |
| Survation | GMB | 23–26 Apr 2021 | 1,008 | 37% | 22% | 18% | 10% | 7% | 2% | – | 1% | – | 1% | 15% |
| Panelbase | Scot Goes Pop | 21–26 Apr 2021 | 1,075 | 36% | 21% | 18% | 10% | 6% | 6% | – | – | – | – | 15% |
| Survation | The Sunday Post | 20–22 Apr 2021 | 1,037 | 35% | 20% | 22% | 10% | 7% | 3% | 1% | 1% | – | 2% | 13% |
| Savanta ComRes | The Scotsman | 16–20 Apr 2021 | 1,001 | 38% | 23% | 17% | 7% | 5% | 1% | – | – | – | 7% | 15% |
| YouGov | The Times | 16–20 Apr 2021 | 1,204 | 39% | 22% | 17% | 10% | 5% | 2% | – | 1% | – | 2% | 17% |
| | | 13 Apr 2021 | STV leaders debate between Sarwar, Rennie, Ross, Sturgeon and Harvie | | | | | | | | | | | |
| Panelbase | Believe in Scotland | 9–12 Apr 2021 | 1,002 | 36% | 22% | 17% | 9% | 6% | 6% | – | – | – | 4% | 14% |
| Lord Ashcroft | N/A | 7–19 Apr 2021 | 2,017 | 42% | 22% | 16% | 9% | 7% | 2% | – | 2% | – | – | 20% |
| Savanta ComRes | The Scotsman | 2–7 Apr 2021 | 1,007 | 40% | 21% | 18% | 9% | 7% | 3% | – | – | – | 3% | 19% |
| Opinium | Sky News | 1–6 Apr 2021 | 1,023 | 44% | 22% | 17% | 7% | 5% | 2% | – | – | – | 3% | 22% |
| Ipsos MORI | STV News | 30 Mar – 4 Apr 2021 | 1,038 | 38% | 21% | 18% | 12% | 6% | 3% | – | – | – | 2% | 17% |
| Panelbase | The Sunday Times | 30 Mar – 1 Apr 2021 | 1,009 | 39% | 21% | 17% | 8% | 5% | 6% | – | – | – | 4% (Note: All for Unity on 4%.) | 18% |
| | | 30 Mar 2021 | BBC Scotland leaders debate between Sarwar, Rennie, Ross, Sturgeon and Slater | | | | | | | | | | | |
| Survation | The Courier | 29–30 Mar 2021 | 1,000 | 38% | 18% | 19% | 11% | 8% | 3% | 1% | 1% | – | 1% | 19% |
| | | 26 Mar 2021 | Former first minister Alex Salmond launches the Alba Party | | | | | | | | | | | |
| Find Out Now | Daily Express | 23–26 Mar 2021 | 1,022 | 42% | 21% | 16% | 11% | 5% | – | – | 2% | – | 2% | 21% |
| YouGov | The Times | 19–22 Mar 2021 | N/A | 46% | 24% | 15% | 8% | 5% | – | – | – | – | 3% | 22% |
| BMG | The Herald | 16–19 Mar 2021 | 1,021 | 42% | 22% | 17% | 8% | 8% | – | – | 1% | – | 2% | 20% |
| Survation | The Courier | 11–18 Mar 2021 | 1,515 | 39% | 19% | 20% | 11% | 7% | – | – | 1% | – | 2% | 19% |
| Opinium | Sky News | 11–16 Mar 2021 | 1,096 | 42% | 22% | 19% | 7% | 5% | – | – | – | – | 4% | 20% |
| Survation | Scotland in Union | 9–12 Mar 2021 | 1,011 | 39% | 21% | 20% | 10% | 8% | – | – | – | – | 2% | 18% |
| Savanta ComRes | The Scotsman | 5–10 Mar 2021 | 1,009 | 40% | 24% | 18% | 10% | 6% | – | – | – | – | 2% | 16% |
| YouGov | The Times | 4–8 Mar 2021 | 1,100 | 45% | 21% | 16% | 6% | 5% | – | – | – | 3% | 4% | 24% |
| Panelbase | The Sunday Times | 3–5 Mar 2021 | 1,013 | 42% | 22% | 19% | 6% | 7% | – | – | – | – | 4% | 20% |
| | | 27 Feb 2021 | Anas Sarwar is elected leader of Scottish Labour | | | | | | | | | | | |
| Survation | Daily Record | 24–25 Feb 2021 | 1,011 | 38% | 21% | 20% | 11% | 7% | – | – | – | – | 3% | 17% |
| Ipsos MORI | STV News | 15–21 Feb 2021 | 1,031 | 47% | 22% | 14% | 8% | 6% | – | – | – | – | 3% (Note: Independence for Scotland Party on 1%.) | 25% |
| Savanta ComRes | The Scotsman | 4–9 Feb 2021 | 1,002 | 39% | 21% | 21% | 10% | 9% | – | – | – | – | 3% | 18% |
| Panelbase | The Sunday Times | 19–22 Jan 2021 | 1,059 | 46% | 20% | 16% | 8% | 6% | – | – | – | – | 3% | 26% |
| Survation | Scot Goes Pop | 11–13 Jan 2021 | 1,020 | 40% | 17% | 19% | 11% | 9% | – | – | – | – | – | 19% |
| Savanta ComRes | The Scotsman | 8–13 Jan 2021 | 1,016 | 40% | 18% | 20% | 10% | 9% | – | – | – | – | 3% | 20% |
| | | 6 Jan 2021 | The Brexit Party is re-registered as Reform UK | | | | | | | | | | | |
| Savanta ComRes | The Scotsman | 11–15 Dec 2020 | 1,013 | 39% | 20% | 20% | 11% | 7% | – | – | – | – | 3% | 19% |
| Survation | N/A | 4–9 Dec 2020 | 1,010 | 41% | 18% | 20% | 10% | 7% | – | – | 1% | – | – | 21% |
| Ipsos MORI | STV News | 20–26 Nov 2020 | 1,006 | 47% | 22% | 16% | 7% | 6% | – | – | – | – | – | 25% |
| Panelbase | Scot Goes Pop | 5–11 Nov 2020 | 1,020 | 46% | 20% | 18% | 8% | 6% | – | – | – | – | 3% | 26% |
| YouGov | N/A | 6–10 Nov 2020 | 1,089 | 47% | 20% | 13% | 7% | 6% | – | – | – | 3% | – | 27% |
| Survation | N/A | 28 Oct – 3 Nov 2020 | 1,071 | 43% | 17% | 19% | 10% | 7% | – | 1% | 2% | – | 1% | 24% |
| Ipsos MORI | STV News | 2–9 Oct 2020 | 1,045 | 48% | 18% | 14% | 9% | 8% | – | – | – | – | – | 30% |
| Savanta ComRes | N/A | 9 Oct 2020 | 1,003 | 41% | 21% | 18% | 11% | 7% | – | – | – | – | 1% | 20% |
| JL Partners | Politico | 17–21 Sep 2020 | 1,016 | 53% | 19% | 13% | 5% | 8% | – | – | – | – | – | 34% |
| Survation | N/A | 2–7 Sep 2020 | 1,018 | 42% | 18% | 18% | 10% | 8% | – | 2% | 2% | – | <1% | 24% |
| Savanta ComRes | N/A | 6–13 Aug 2020 | 1,008 | 43% | 21% | 17% | 10% | 8% | – | – | – | – | 2% | 22% |
| YouGov | The Times | 6–10 Aug 2020 | 1,142 | 47% | 21% | 14% | 6% | 7% | – | – | 1% | 4% | 1% | 26% |
| | | 5 Aug 2020 | Douglas Ross becomes leader of the Scottish Conservatives | | | | | | | | | | | |
| Panelbase | The Sunday Times | 30 Jun – 3 Jul 2020 | 1,026 | 50% | 18% | 15% | 8% | 6% | – | – | – | – | 2% | 32% |
| Panelbase | Scot Goes Pop | 1–5 Jun 2020 | 1,022 | 48% | 19% | 16% | 7% | 8% | – | – | – | – | 2% | 29% |
| Panelbase | Wings Over Scotland | 1–5 May 2020 | 1,086 | 48% | 22% | 15% | 7% | 6% | – | – | – | – | 1% | 26% |
| YouGov | N/A | 24–27 Apr 2020 | 1,095 | 45% | 23% | 12% | 8% | 7% | – | – | – | 4% | 1% | 22% |
| Panelbase | The Sunday Times | 24–26 Mar 2020 | 1,023 | 48% | 26% | 13% | 6% | 6% | – | – | – | – | 1% | 22% |
| | | 14 Feb 2020 | Jackson Carlaw is elected leader of the Scottish Conservatives | | | | | | | | | | | |
| Panelbase | Scot Goes Pop | 28–31 Jan 2020 | 1,016 | 47% | 25% | 14% | 7% | 7% | – | – | – | – | <1% | 22% |
| Survation | Progress Scotland | 20–22 Jan 2020 | 1,019 | 38% | 21% | 19% | 9% | 9% | – | 1% | 2% | – | – | 17% |
| | | 12 Dec 2019 | 2019 United Kingdom general election | | | | | | | | | | | |
| Panelbase | The Sunday Times | 3–6 Dec 2019 | 1,020 | 38% | 26% | 18% | 6% | 9% | – | – | 2% | – | – | 12% |
| YouGov | The Times | 29 Nov – 3 Dec 2019 | 1,002 | 37% | 25% | 14% | 8% | 10% | – | – | 2% | 3% | <1% | 12% |
| Panelbase | The Sunday Times | 20–22 Nov 2019 | 1,009 | 39% | 25% | 17% | 6% | 9% | – | – | 3% | – | – | 14% |
| Panelbase | The Sunday Times | 9–11 Oct 2019 | 1,003 | 38% | 21% | 18% | 6% | 11% | – | <1% | 4% | – | <1% | 17% |
| YouGov | The Times | 30 Aug – 3 Sep 2019 | 1,059 | 39% | 20% | 11% | 8% | 13% | – | 1% | 5% | 3% | <1% | 19% |
| | | 29 Aug 2019 | Shetland by-election | | | | | | | | | | | |
| | | 1 Aug 2019 | Lorna Slater is elected co-leader of the Scottish Greens alongside Patrick Harvie | | | | | | | | | | | |
| Panelbase | The Sunday Times | 18–20 Jun 2019 | 1,024 | 39% | 20% | 16% | 7% | 10% | – | <1% | 6% | – | <1% | 19% |
| | | 23 May 2019 | 2019 European Parliament election | | | | | | | | | | | |
| Panelbase | The Sunday Times | 14–17 May 2019 | 1,021 | 37% | 19% | 18% | 7% | 8% | – | 2% | 6% | – | 2% | 18% |
| YouGov | The Times | 24–26 Apr 2019 | 1,029 | 37% | 20% | 15% | 10% | 7% | – | 2% | 5% | 3% | 2% | 17% |
| Panelbase | N/A | 18–24 Apr 2019 | 1,018 | 37% | 22% | 19% | 7% | 7% | – | 2% | 4% | – | 2% | 15% |
| Panelbase | Wings Over Scotland | 28 Feb – 6 Mar 2019 | 1,002 | 36% | 26% | 19% | 6% | 9% | – | 3% | – | – | <1% | 10% |
| Survation | Scottish Daily Mail | 1–4 Mar 2019 | 1,011 | 32% | 22% | 19% | 11% | 11% | – | 3% | – | – | 1% | 10% |
| Panelbase | The Sunday Times | 30 Nov – 5 Dec 2018 | 1,028 | 38% | 26% | 22% | 6% | 7% | – | 1% | – | – | <1% | 12% |
| Panelbase | Constitutional Commission | 2–7 Nov 2018 | 1,050 | 37% | 26% | 22% | 6% | 6% | – | 2% | – | – | <1% | 11% |
| Survation | Daily Record | 18–21 Oct 2018 | 1,017 | 32% | 23% | 23% | 9% | 9% | – | – | – | – | 4% | 9% |
| Survation | SNP | 3–5 Oct 2018 | 1,013 | 40% | 25% | 22% | 4% | 8% | – | – | – | – | 2% | 15% |
| Panelbase | The Sunday Times | 28 Sep – 4 Oct 2018 | 1,024 | 35% | 26% | 20% | 7% | 8% | – | 2% | – | – | 1% | 9% |
| Survation | The Sunday Post | 28 Sep – 2 Oct 2018 | 1,036 | 32% | 21% | 23% | 10% | 8% | – | 5% | – | – | 0% | 9% |
| Survation | Daily Record | 5–10 Jul 2018 | 1,004 | 33% | 19% | 21% | 11% | 10% | – | 5% | – | – | 1% | 12% |
| Panelbase | Wings Over Scotland | 21–27 Jun 2018 | 1,018 | 36% | 27% | 23% | 6% | 7% | – | 1% | – | – | <1% | 9% |
| Panelbase | The Sunday Times | 8–13 Jun 2018 | 1,021 | 36% | 26% | 23% | 7% | 6% | – | 1% | – | – | <1% | 10% |
| YouGov | The Times | 1–5 Jun 2018 | 1,075 | 32% | 26% | 21% | 9% | 7% | – | 1% | – | 3% | <1% | 6% |
| Survation | Daily Record | 24–28 Jan 2018 | 1,029 | 33% | 23% | 23% | 9% | 8% | – | 3% | – | – | 1% | 10% |
| YouGov | The Times | 12–16 Jan 2018 | 1,002 | 32% | 25% | 22% | 10% | 7% | – | 3% | – | 2% | <1% | 7% |
| Survation | The Sunday Post | 1–5 Dec 2017 | 1,006 | 32% | 21% | 24% | 10% | 10% | – | 3% | – | – | 1% | 8% |
| Survation | Daily Record | 27–30 Nov 2017 | 1,017 | 33% | 22% | 25% | 8% | 8% | – | 3% | – | – | <1% | 8% |
| | | 18 Nov 2017 | Richard Leonard is elected leader of Scottish Labour | | | | | | | | | | | |
| YouGov | The Times | 2–5 Oct 2017 | 1,135 | 35% | 23% | 24% | 6% | 6% | – | 1% | – | 3% | <1% | 11% |
| Survation | Scottish Daily Mail | 8–12 Sep 2017 | 1,016 | 31% | 21% | 25% | 9% | 10% | – | 3% | – | – | <1% | 6% |
| | | 8 Jun 2017 | 2017 United Kingdom general election | | | | | | | | | | | |
| | | 4 May 2017 | 2017 Scottish local elections | | | | | | | | | | | |
| YouGov | The Times | 9–14 Mar 2017 | 1,028 | 40% | 25% | 14% | 12% | 5% | – | 2% | – | 1% (Note: Figure for RISE – Scotland's Left Alliance, of which the Scottish Socialist Party was a constituent in the previous election.) | 1% | 15% |
| YouGov | The Times | 24–29 Nov 2016 | 1,134 | 39% | 24% | 14% | 11% | 6% | – | 4% | – | 1% | 0% | 15% |
| BMG | N/A | 28 Sep – 4 Oct 2016 | 1,010 | 43% | 20% | 16% | 8% | 7% | – | 3% | – | – | 1% | 23% |
| YouGov | The Times | 29–31 Aug 2016 | 1,039 | 45% | 21% | 15% | 9% | 6% | – | 2% | – | – | 0% | 24% |
| Survation | Scottish Daily Mail | 24–28 Jun 2016 | 1,055 | 41% | 20% | 16% | 12% | 7% | – | 4% | – | – | 1% | 21% |
| 2016 Scottish Parliament election | | 5 May 2016 | – | 41.7% | 22.9% | 19.1% | 6.6% | 5.2% | – | 2.0% | – | 0.5% (Note: Contested the election as part of RISE – Scotland's Left Alliance.) | 2.4% | 18.8% |

== Methodology ==
Each polling organisation are members of the British Polling Council and uses slightly different methodology in their collection of data. All organisations remove voters who do not give a voting intention from their headline figures; this is usually ranges from 10% to 15% of respondents likely to vote. A brief description of each company's methods is as follows:

- Panelbase collects its data via an online panel, with results weighted to be demographically representative of the voting age population in terms of age, sex, and country of birth, previous general election vote and independence referendum vote. Additionally, the voting intention data is weighted by how likely respondents were to vote.
- Survation collects data from its online panel, with the results weighted to the profile of all Scottish adults of voting age in terms of age, sex, region, previous general election vote, previous Scottish Parliament election constituency vote, EU membership referendum vote and independence referendum vote. Responses for voting intention were additionally weighted by likelihood to vote in the election. The data for the 3–5 October 2018 poll for the Scottish National Party was collected via telephone, instead of the online panel.
- YouGov collects its data through an online survey of its panel, and weights its respondents to be representative of the voting age population as a whole in terms of age by gender by education level (such as Male aged between 25 and 49 with a high level of education), social grades, previous general election vote, independence referendum vote, the respondents' political attention and birthplace (Scotland, elsewhere in the United Kingdom and outside the UK). Additionally, the headline voting intention data is weighted by how likely respondents said they were to vote and whether they voted at the previous general election.

== See also ==
- Opinion polling for the 2024 United Kingdom general election
- Opinion polling for the 2021 Senedd election
- Opinion polling for the 2022 Northern Ireland Assembly election
- Opinion polling for the 2016 Scottish Parliament election
- Opinion polling on Scottish independence
