= 2017 Welsh Liberal Democrats leadership election =

- 25 September – 28 October 2017
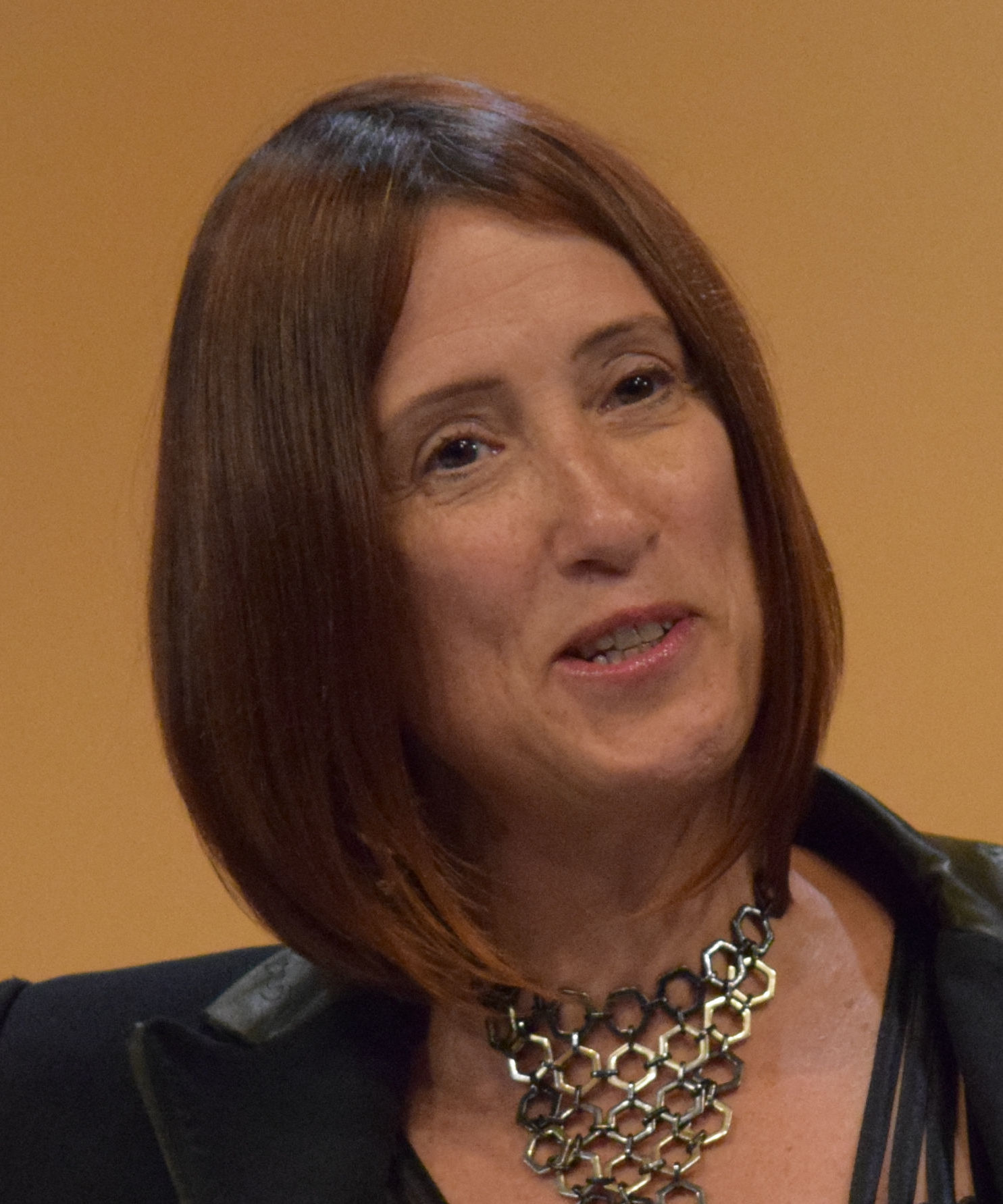

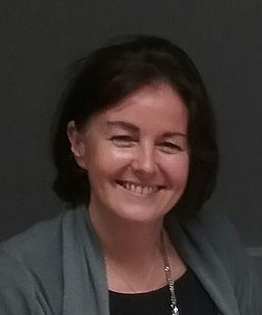
Candidate	Jane Dodds	Elizabeth Evans
First round	587	519
Percentage	56.5%	43.5%
Leader before election
Kirsty Williams (acting)
Mark Williams
Elected Leader
Jane Dodds

The Welsh Liberal Democrats leadership election took place during the autumn of 2017 and was won by Jane Dodds, who defeated Ceredigion Councillor Elizabeth Evans in a closely fought contest.

== Background ==
Following the 2017 general election, the party's leader and only MP Mark Williams lost his Ceredigion seat by 104 votes. Following his loss he resigned from his position.

His predecessor as leader, Kirsty Williams, took over as interim leader, but announced she wouldn't be a candidate in the forthcoming leadership election.

== Candidates ==
Candidate	Born	Electoral history	Endorsements
Jane Dodds	23 September 1963 (age 54); Wrexham	Contested Montgomeryshire in the 2015 and 2017 general elections and Montgomeryshire in the 2016 National Assembly for Wales election. Richmond upon Thames Councillor for North Richmond 2006 to 2010.	Jenny Randerson, Baroness Randerson, Joan Walmsley, Baroness Walmsley, Martin Thomas, Baron Thomas of Gresford
Elizabeth Evans	23 February; Aberaeron	Ceredigion Councillor for Aberaeron since 2008.	Peter Black, Mark Williams

== Results ==
On Jane Dodds was declared the winner with 56.5% of the vote on 3 November 2017.

Candidate	Votes	%
Turnout: 35.2%
Jane Dodds	587	56.5
Elizabeth Evans	519	43.5
Total	1,106	
