= Gareth Bennett (politician) =

British politician

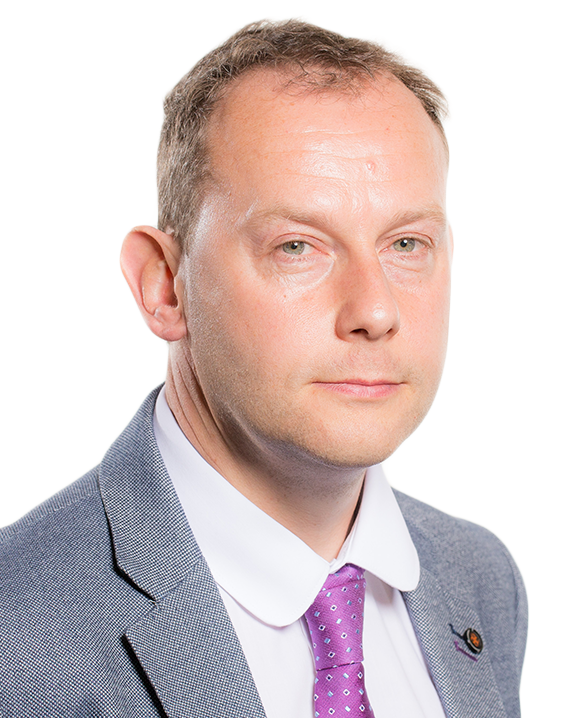
- Bennett in 2016

Leader of the UK Independence Party in the Senedd
- In office 10 August 2018 – 7 November 2019
- Leader: Neil Hamilton
- Preceded by: Caroline Jones
- Succeeded by: Neil Hamilton

Member of the Senedd for South Wales Central
- In office 5 May 2016 – 29 April 2021
- Preceded by: Eluned Parrott
- Succeeded by: Rhys ab Owen

Personal details
- Born: 1 December 1968 (age 57) Cardiff, Wales
- Party: Independent (2019–2020; 2021); Abolish the Welsh Assembly (2020 - 2021); UK Independence Party (2014–2019)
- Education: Middlesex Polytechnic; Cardiff Institute of Higher Education

Gareth John Bennett (born 1 December 1968) is a Welsh politician who served as the Leader of the UK Independence Party (UKIP) in the Senedd from 2018 to 2019, and was a Member of the Senedd (MS) for South Wales Central from 2016 to 2021.

On 10 August 2018 he was elected the leader of UKIP in the Senedd. On 7 November 2019, he quit UKIP to become an independent. On 24 June 2020, he joined Abolish the Welsh Assembly Party. In April 2021, Bennett decided to stand as an independent candidate in the Senedd election of that year, unsuccessfully contesting the Cynon Valley constituency.

== Early life ==
Bennett was born in Cardiff on 1 December 1968. He was educated at Llandaff City Primary School and Radyr Comprehensive School. He studied sociology at Middlesex Polytechnic but left halfway through the course, returning to Cardiff to study journalism at the Cardiff Institute of Higher Education, which lead to a post with the Carmarthen Journal.

== Political career ==
Bennett joined UKIP in 2014. He campaigned in the 2014 European election, and was agent for UKIP candidate Brian Morris in Cardiff West at the 2015 general election.

=== Member of the Senedd ===
When Bennett was selected to contest the South Wales Central electoral region, he was criticised for blaming rubbish problems in Cardiff on students and Eastern European immigrants and was nicknamed the 'Donald Trump of Wales'. This led to senior UKIP figures including leader Nigel Farage and immigration spokesman Steven Woolfe publicly distancing themselves from Bennett. A petition containing the names of 16 other UKIP Assembly candidates opposing Bennett's candidacy was presented to the party's National Executive Committee, which upheld his candidacy. Bennett ran in Cardiff West, coming fourth with 2,629 votes (8.2%). He also ran for UKIP on the South Wales Central list, and was elected, with the party receiving 10.4% of the vote.

In the UKIP Assembly group, Bennett backed Neil Hamilton for leader over Nathan Gill. After Hamilton became leader of the group, Bennett was appointed as UKIP Assembly spokesman for Local Government, Housing and Sport. In April 2017, Bennett was appointed as UKIP's Business Manager in the Assembly. In the same month, the Assembly's Equalities Committee, of which Bennett was a member, published a report about refugees. Bennett brought out his own report, in which he complained that the proposals would encourage more refugees to come to Wales.

In December 2017, Bennett was banned from speaking in the Chamber of the Welsh Assembly for a year by Presiding Officer Elin Jones. The ban came after Bennett claimed that making the process to change legal gender easier would lead society to implode. Bennett refused to apologise or withdraw his remarks, and was barred. In January 2018, Bennett made a partial apology in which he stated that he would accept the authority of the Presiding Officer, and he was allowed to resume his speaking duties without withdrawing his previous remarks.

In February 2018, Bennett led UKIP's opposition to plans to expand the Welsh Assembly's membership.

Bennett claimed almost £10,000 in expenses to set up an office which never opened.

==== UKIP Senedd leader ====
In July 2018, it was announced that there would be a ballot of UKIP party members in Wales to decide the position of UKIP Leader in Wales. The three candidates who announced that they were running for the post were former Assembly Group Leader Neil Hamilton, who had just been ousted from the role; Caroline Jones, who had ousted him; and Gareth Bennett. Bennett's main policy planks included his campaign to abolish the Welsh Assembly, and his opposition to the Welsh Government's Welsh language policies. He won the UKIP Wales leadership election in August 2018, with 269 votes.

In August 2018, Bennett was criticised by First Minister Carwyn Jones and other Assembly members for supporting Boris Johnson's remarks about the Muslim veil.

In April 2019, Bennett was again suspended for 7 days, after he published a video on YouTube in which he had edited the face of Labour MS Joyce Watson onto an image of a barmaid. In the video he said of Watson, who formerly ran a pub, that "you wouldn't guess that from looking at her", and that "She doesn't look like the life and soul of the party. I'm not sure I would fancy popping in for a quick one at the local if I saw her pulling pints at the bar."

On 3 June 2019, Bennett announced that he would be running in the 2019 UK Independence Party leadership election after Gerard Batten stood down as leader. Bennett has claimed that he would take UKIP forward with 'bold policy ideas', after Gerard Batten's one-year term came to an end. Bennett published his 2019 UKIP Leadership Election Manifesto on his website, which includes policies such as 'National ID Cards' ,'UKIP Party Democracy', 'National Volunteer Force', 'Regular Referenda', 'Freedom of Speech', 'Regulating Mosques', 'Scrap Foreign Aid' and 'Abolishing Politicians'. On 11 July, Bennett announced that he would withdraw his leadership bid in order to promote Ben Walker's campaign.

==== Post-UKIP ====
On 7 November 2019, he quit UKIP to become an independent politician, claiming that his former party was "trying to sabotage Brexit". Bennett also announced that he would be supporting the Withdrawal Agreement agreed by then Prime Minister, Boris Johnson.

In June 2020, Bennett joined the Abolish the Welsh Assembly Party, becoming the party's first Senedd member; fellow MS Mark Reckless also joined the party in October that same year.

Ahead of the 2021 Senedd election, Bennett announced that he would stand as an independent candidate in Cynon Valley, rather than for Abolish the Welsh Assembly. A party spokesperson said that Bennett's decision was by mutual agreement by both him and the party. In the election, Bennett polled 278 votes (1.4%), coming last out of all candidates. Additionally, he was not a candidate on the South Wales Central list.

Senedd
Preceded by Eluned Parrott	Member of the Senedd for South Wales Central; 2016–2021	Succeeded by Rhys ab Owen
