= 2018 UKIP Wales leadership election =

Welsh internal political party contest

2018 UKIP Welsh Assembly leadership election
- 18 June – 10 August 2018
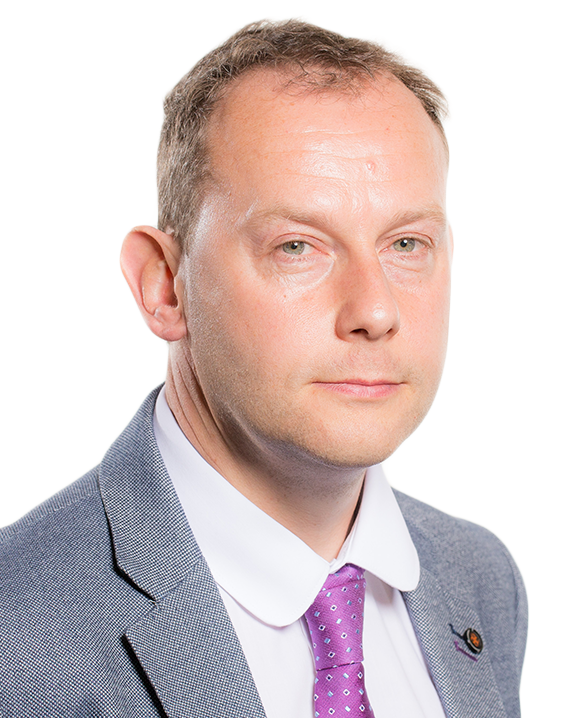

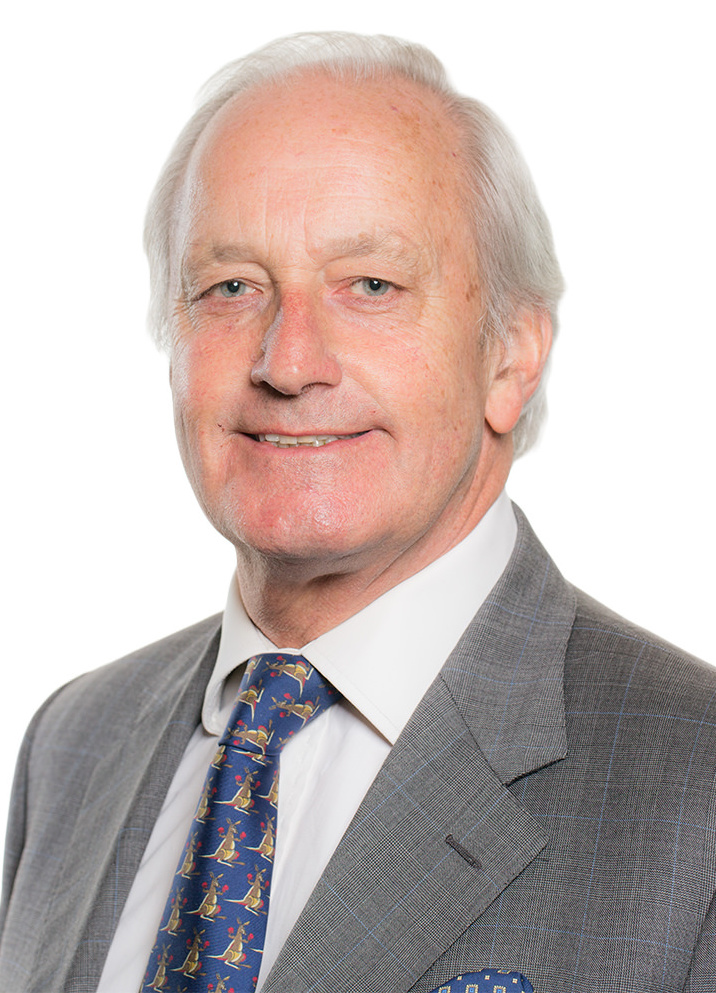

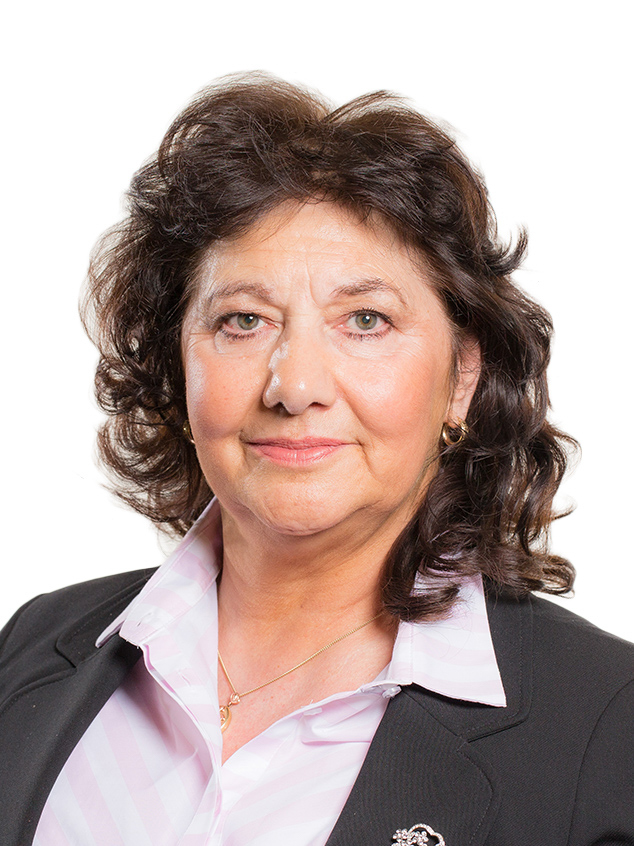
Candidate	Gareth Bennett	Neil Hamilton	Caroline Jones
First round	Unknown	Unknown	130
Second round	269	193	Eliminated
Leader before election
Caroline Jones
Elected Leader
Gareth Bennett

The 2018 UKIP Wales leadership election was a leadership election to determine the UK Independence Party's next leader in the National Assembly for Wales. The election was held from 18 June to 10 August 2018. The approximately 900 members of the party in Wales were eligible to vote in the election.

After the 2016 Welsh Assembly election, Neil Hamilton was elected leader of the UK Independence Party group in the Assembly, replacing Nathan Gill. Hamilton had been supported by four AMs, whilst Gill had been supported by three.

In May 2018, Caroline Jones replaced Hamilton after a majority vote in the then five-strong Assembly group.

In June 2018, national deputy party leader Mike Hookem informed the group that an election would be held for the leadership of the Assembly group.

Gareth Bennett won the UKIP Welsh Assembly leadership election on 10 August 2018. Hamilton remained as Leader of the UK Independence Party in Wales, with Bennett serving as Leader of UKIP in the Welsh Assembly.

== Campaign ==
The party increased the franchise for the election, changing to a twenty-eight-day cutoff instead of the originally planned for a six-month cut-off. This increased the number of eligible voters by about 300 to "just short of 900". The vote had been scheduled to conclude by the end of July, but the count was moved to 10 August following issues printing ballots.

Bennett's two main policy planks were his campaign to abolish the Welsh Assembly itself (he called for a referendum on the issue); and his opposition to the Welsh Government's Welsh language policies.

== Results ==
514 of the party's 876 members voted. Caroline Jones was eliminated in the first round with 130 votes. Gareth Bennett went on to win the second round, with 269 votes to Neil Hamilton's 193.

== See also ==
- 2018 Welsh Labour Party leadership election
- 2018 Plaid Cymru leadership election
