= 2018 Welsh Conservatives leadership election =

- 29 June – 6 September 2018
- Turnout: 52%
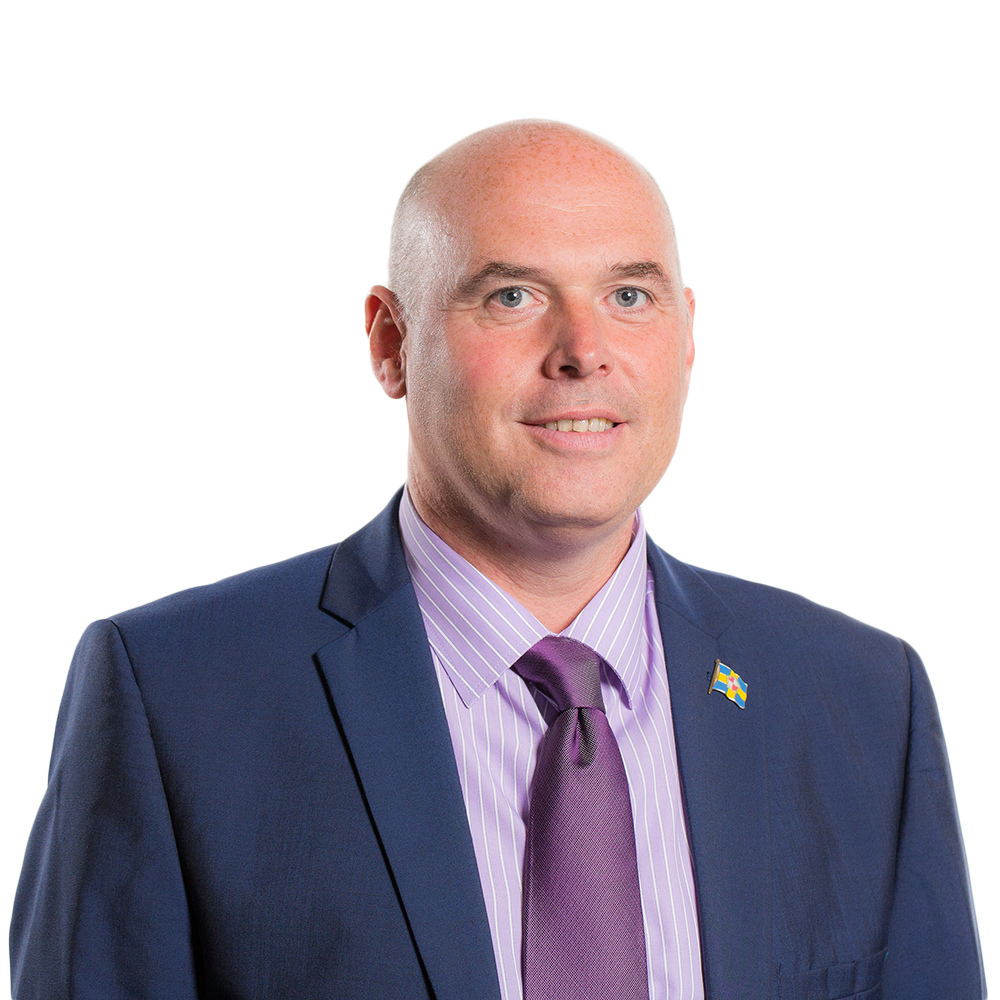

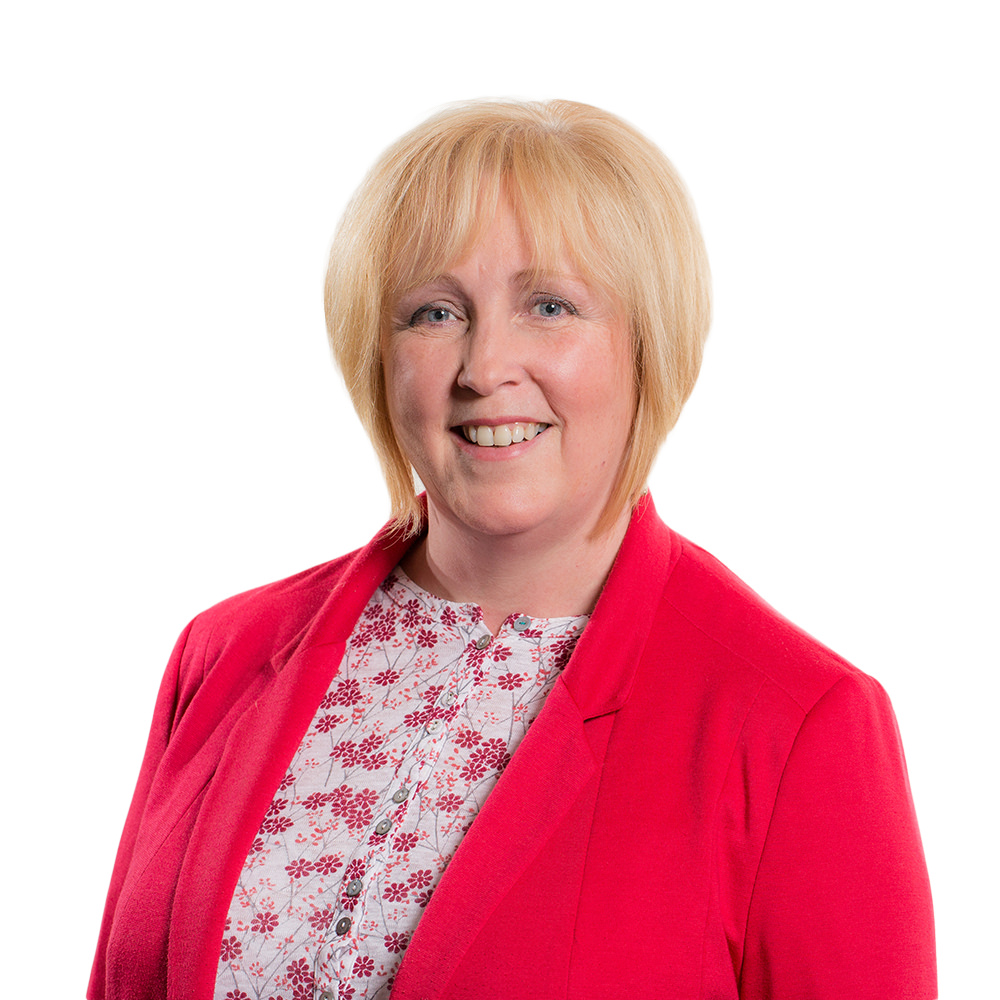
Candidate	Paul Davies	Suzy Davies
Percentage	68.1%	31.9%
Leader before election
Paul Davies (acting)
Andrew RT Davies
Elected Leader
Paul Davies

The 2018 Welsh Conservatives leadership election was triggered on 27 June by the resignation of Andrew RT Davies.

Davies had led the Welsh Conservatives since 14 July 2011.

Paul Davies won the contest and became the new leader.

== Procedure ==
Candidates require a total of four nominations from Conservative AMs, including themselves, to stand.

If there are three or more candidates, Conservative AMs vote until there are two candidates, who are then voted on by the party's membership.

=== Timetable ===
29 June	Nominations open
16 July	Nominations close
17 July	Nominations announced
30 July	Hustings start
10 August	Hustings end
15 August	Voting opens
5 September	Voting closes
6 September	Count and declaration

== Campaign ==
Leader Andrew RT Davies stood down in June 2018. WalesOnline reported that this was because he felt he did not have the full support of the Conservative group. He told the BBC that he had been aware of plans to remove him for more than a year. His departure was credited to what The Guardian described as his "uncompromising" support for Brexit.

Deputy Leader Paul Davies was appointed as an Interim Leader, and announced that he would stand for the permanent leadership.

In July, Suzy Davies announced she would stand, saying that she thought it was important for the Welsh Conservatives to have a contested election. She said she would be willing to work with Plaid Cymru to get rid of the Labour government in Wales. She supported reducing taxes, as well as giving some business rates proceeds to councils to use them for private sector-led local development strategies. Suzy Davies also argued for giving the private sector a "real stake in the communities in which they develop" and giving workers an "emotional stake" in their employers.

Paul Davies launched his campaign in Gwent, pledging to give Welsh Conservative Party members a vote on any potential coalition in the Welsh Assembly. He said he would consider cutting taxes in Wales, as well as supporting high street businesses and redesign the business rates system.

The South Wales Argus described Paul Davies as having the support of "most of the big hitters in the party".

== Candidates ==
Candidate	Political roles	Nominations from AMs	Endorsements
Paul Davies	AM for Preseli Pembrokeshire since 2007 Deputy Leader of the Welsh Conservatives since 2011	3 / 12 25.0% Nominations Darren Millar Nick Ramsay	Endorsements: Stephen Crabb; David Davies
Suzy Davies	AM for South Wales West since 2011 Shadow Minister for Tourism, Culture and the Welsh Language from 2011 to 2016	4 / 12 33.3% Nominations: Janet Finch-Saunders; Mark Isherwood; David Melding	Endorsements

=== Declined ===
- Russell George, AM for Montgomeryshire since 2011
- David Melding, AM for South Wales Central since 1999, Deputy Presiding Officer from 2011 to 2016
- Darren Millar, AM for Clwyd West since 2007, Shadow Minister for Education since 2016

== See also ==
- 2018 Welsh Labour Party leadership election
- 2018 Plaid Cymru leadership election
