= 1st National Assembly for Wales =

1st Assembly
2nd Assembly	→
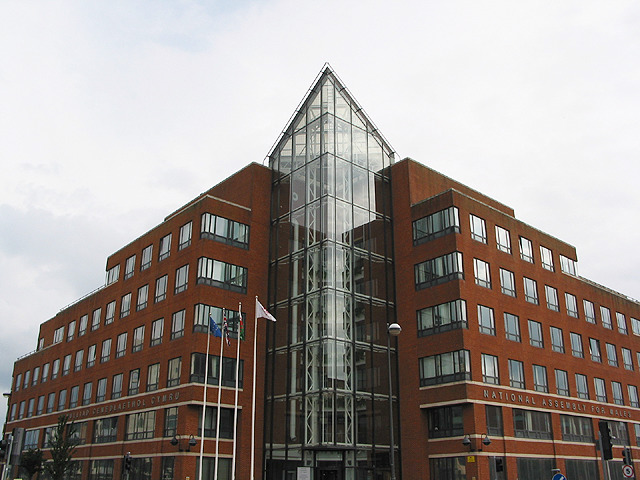
- Crickhowell House in 2007

Overview
- Legislative body: National Assembly for Wales
- Jurisdiction: Wales, United Kingdom
- Meeting place: Crickhowell House, Cardiff
- Term: 6 May 1999 – 1 May 2003
- Election: 1999 National Assembly for Wales election
- Government: Michael government (1999–2000); Interim Morgan government (2000); First Morgan government (2000–03)
- Opposition: Shadow Cabinet of Dafydd Wigley (1999–2000); Shadow Cabinet of Ieuan Wyn Jones (2000–03)
- Members: 60
- Presiding Officer: Dafydd Elis-Thomas (1999–2003)
- First Minister: Alun Michael (1999–2000); Rhodri Morgan (2000–03)
- Deputy First Minister: Mike German (2000–01); Jenny Randerson (2001–02; acting); Mike German (2002–03)

This is a list of Assembly Members (AMs; Welsh: Aelodau'r Cynulliad, ACau) elected to the first National Assembly for Wales at the 1999 election.

== Composition of the Assembly ==
Party		1999 election	Prior to 2003 election
•	Labour	28 (Note: Includes 8 MSs sponsored by the Co-operative Party, who are designated Labour and Co-operative.)	28
	Plaid Cymru	17	17
	Conservative	9	9
•	Liberal Democrats	6	6
Total		60	60

Government parties denoted with bullets (•) The House of Commons Library reported that Labour won 28 seats, Plaid Cymru 17, the Conservatives 9, and the Liberal Democrats 6 in the first Welsh Assembly election.

== Members ==
- Lorraine Barrett
- Mick Bates
- Peter Black
- Nick Bourne
- Eleanor Burnham
- Rosemary Butler
- Alun Cairns
- Christine Chapman
- Cynog Dafis
- Jane Davidson
- Andrew Davies
- David Davies
- Geraint Davies
- Glyn Davies
- Janet Davies
- Jocelyn Davies
- Ron Davies
- Richard Edwards
- Dafydd Elis-Thomas
- Sue Essex
- Delyth Evans
- Val Feld
- Mike German, Baron German
- Brian Gibbons
- William Graham
- Janice Gregory
- John Griffiths
- Christine Gwyther
- Alison Halford
- Brian Hancock
- Edwina Hart
- Christine Humphreys
- Jane Hutt
- Pauline Jarman
- Ann Jones
- Carwyn Jones
- David Jones
- Elin Jones
- Gareth Jones
- Helen Mary Jones
- Ieuan Wyn Jones
- Peter Law
- Huw Lewis
- David Lloyd
- Val Lloyd
- John Marek
- David Melding
- Alun Michael
- Tom Middlehurst
- Jonathan Morgan
- Rhodri Morgan
- Lynne Neagle
- Alun Pugh
- Jenny Randerson, Baroness Randerson
- Rod Richards
- Peter Rogers
- Janet Ryder
- Karen Sinclair
- Gwenda Thomas
- Owen John Thomas
- Rhodri Glyn Thomas
- Dafydd Wigley
- Kirsty Williams
- Phil Williams

== See also ==
- Government of the 1st National Assembly for Wales (disambiguation)
- 1999 National Assembly for Wales election
