= List of Welsh governments =

This is a list of all Welsh Government ministerial teams which have existed since the introduction of devolution for Wales in 1999. From the onset of devolution in Wales in 1999 until 2026, each Welsh Government administration was led by the Labour Party. The current administration is led by Plaid Cymru.

== Ministries of the Welsh Government ==
=== 1st Assembly ===
Term	Ministry	First Minister	Deputy	Parties	Type
1999–2000	Michael	Alun Michael	office not in use	Labour	Minority
2000	Interim Rhodri Morgan	Rhodri Morgan	office not in use	Labour	Caretaker
2000–2003	1st Rhodri Morgan	Rhodri Morgan	Mike German	Labour	Coalition
2000–2003	1st Rhodri Morgan	Rhodri Morgan	Mike German	Liberal Democrats	Coalition
=== 2nd Assembly ===
Term	Ministry	First Minister	Deputy	Parties	Type
2003–2007	2nd Rhodri Morgan	Rhodri Morgan	office not in use	Labour	Minority
=== 3rd Assembly ===
Term	Ministry	First Minister	Deputy	Parties	Type
2007–2007	3rd Rhodri Morgan	Rhodri Morgan	office not in use	Labour	Caretaker
2007–2009	4th Rhodri Morgan	Rhodri Morgan	Ieuan Wyn Jones	Labour	Coalition
2007–2009	4th Rhodri Morgan	Rhodri Morgan	Ieuan Wyn Jones	Plaid Cymru	Coalition
2009–2011	1st Jones	Carwyn Jones	Ieuan Wyn Jones	Labour	Coalition
2009–2011	1st Jones	Carwyn Jones	Ieuan Wyn Jones	Plaid Cymru	Coalition
=== 4th Assembly ===
Term	Ministry	First Minister	Deputy	Parties	Type
2011–2016	2nd Jones	Carwyn Jones	office not in use	Labour	Minority
=== 5th Assembly/Senedd ===
Term	Ministry	First Minister	Deputy	Parties	Type
2016–2018	3rd Jones	Carwyn Jones	office not in use	Labour	Coalition
2016–2018	3rd Jones	Carwyn Jones	office not in use	Liberal Democrats	Coalition
2016–2018	3rd Jones	Carwyn Jones	office not in use	Independent from Nov 2017	Coalition
2018–2021	1st Drakeford	Mark Drakeford	office not in use	Labour	Coalition
2018–2021	1st Drakeford	Mark Drakeford	office not in use	Liberal Democrats	Coalition
2018–2021	1st Drakeford	Mark Drakeford	office not in use	Independent	Coalition
=== 6th Senedd ===
Term	Ministry	First Minister	Deputy	Parties	Type
2021–2024	2nd Drakeford	Mark Drakeford	office not in use	Labour	Minority
2024	Gething	Vaughan Gething	office not in use	Labour	Minority
2024–2026	Eluned Morgan	Eluned Morgan	Huw Irranca-Davies	Labour	Minority
=== 7th Senedd ===
Term	Ministry	First Minister	Deputy	Parties	Type
2026–present	ap Iorwerth	Rhun ap Iorwerth	Sioned Williams	Plaid Cymru	Minority

== See also ==
- List of British governments
- List of Northern Ireland Executives
- List of Scottish governments
