= Morgan government =

Morgan government may refer to:

- Interim Rhodri Morgan administration, the Welsh Assembly Administration led by Rhodri Morgan from February to October 2000
- First Rhodri Morgan government, the Welsh Assembly Government led by Rhodri Morgan from October 2000 to 2003
- Second Rhodri Morgan government, the Welsh Assembly Government led by Rhodri Morgan from 2003 to 2007
- Third Rhodri Morgan government, the Welsh Assembly Government led by Rhodri Morgan from May to July 2007
- Fourth Rhodri Morgan government, the Welsh Assembly Government led by Rhodri Morgan from July 2007 to 2009
- Eluned Morgan government, the Welsh Government led by Eluned Morgan from August 2024 to May 2026

== See also ==
- Governor Morgan (disambiguation)
