= Interim Rhodri Morgan administration =

Welsh government (2000)

Interim Morgan administration
- 2nd devolved administration of Wales
- 9 February 2000 – 16 October 2000
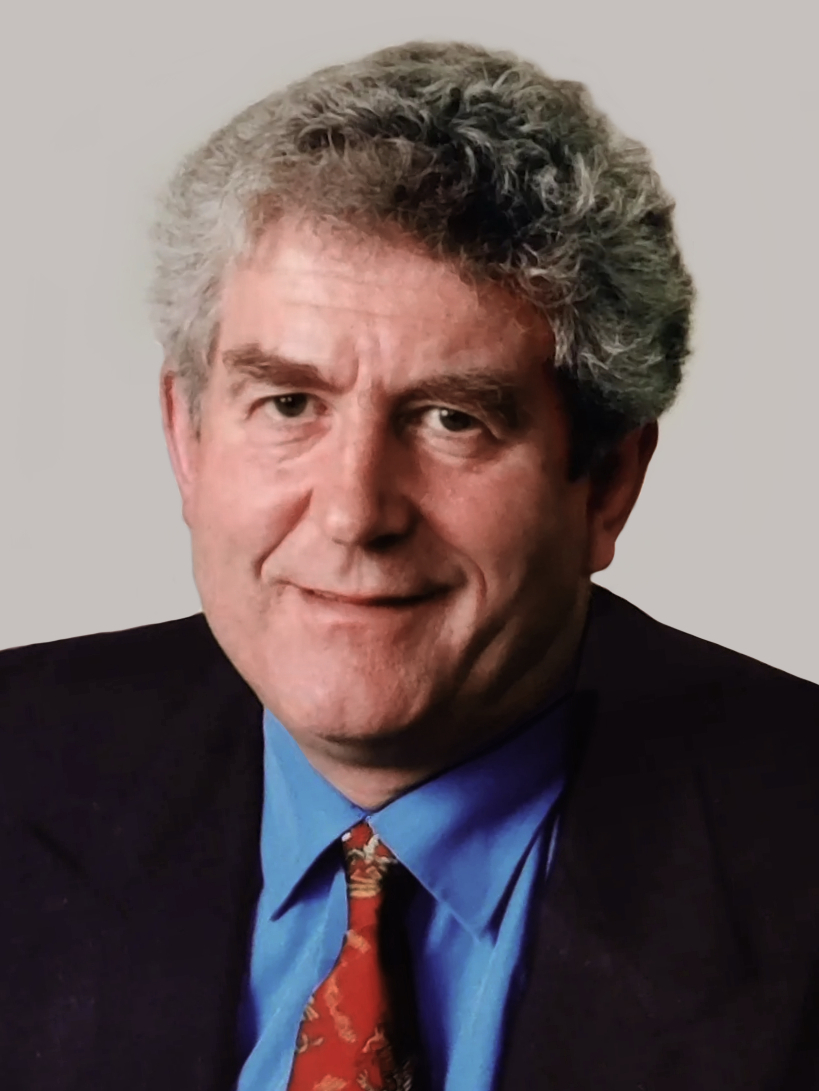
- Date formed: 9 February 2000
- Date dissolved: 16 October 2000

People and organisations
- Monarch: Elizabeth II
- First Minister: Rhodri Morgan
- Member party: Labour
- Status in legislature: Minority
- Opposition party: Plaid Cymru
- Opposition leader: Dafydd Wigley; Ieuan Wyn Jones

History
- Incoming formation: 2000 Welsh Labour leadership election
- Legislature term: 1st National Assembly for Wales
- Predecessor: Michael administration
- Successor: First Rhodri Morgan government

The interim Rhodri Morgan administration was a temporary government of Wales formed on 9 February 2000 by Rhodri Morgan, following the resignation of Alun Michael as First Secretary, which was pre-empted by a vote of no-confidence by Plaid Cymru.

Rhodri Morgan was named as Acting First Secretary on 9 February and confirmed as the permanent First Secretary on 15 February 2000. This Ministry ran until Morgan formed a coalition government with the Liberal Democrats in October 2000.

This administration was always viewed as temporary and Labour had mooted looking for a coalition partner following their perceived poor showing in the 1999 election.

== Cabinet ==
Office	Portrait	Name	Term	Party
First Secretary of Wales and Secretary for Economic Development		Rhodri Morgan*	9 February - 16 October	Labour
Minister for Assembly Business		Andrew Davies*	22 February - 16 October	Labour
Finance Secretary		Edwina Hart**	22 February - 16 October	Labour
Secretary for Post 16 Education and Training		Tom Middlehurst***	22 February - 9 October	Labour
Minister for Health and Social Services		Jane Hutt*	22 February - 16 October	Labour
Secretary for Education and Children		Rosemary Butler***	22 February - 16 October	Labour
Secretary for Agriculture and Rural Development		Christine Gwyther	22 February - 23 July	Labour
Secretary for Agriculture and Rural Development		Carwyn Jones**	23 July - 16 October	Labour
Secretary for Local Government and Housing		Peter Law***	22 February - 16 October	Labour
Secretary for Environment, Planning and Transport		Sue Essex**	22 February - 16 October	Labour
Office holders given special provisions to attend Cabinet:
Chief Whip		Karen Sinclair	22 February - 16 October	Labour

* Indicates that the individual kept the same or similar job in the next government.
** Indicates that the individual was moved to a new job in the next government.
*** Indicates that the individual was either sacked or quit and held no ministerial role in the next government.

== Deputy Secretaries ==
Deputy Secretaries prior to the enactment of the Government of Wales Act 2006 were not officially part of the Government, were not paid and received limited official support.

Office	Portrait	Name	Term	Party
Deputy Secretary for Health and Social Services		Alun Pugh**	23 February 2000 - 17 October 2000	Labour
Deputy Secretary for Agriculture, Local Government and Environment		Carwyn Jones	23 February 2000 - 23 July 2000	Labour
Deputy Secretary for Agriculture, Local Government and Environment		Delyth Evans*	24 July 2000 - 17 October 2000	Labour
Deputy Secretary for Education and the Economy		Christine Chapman***	23 February 2000 - 17 October 2000	Labour

* Indicates that the individual kept the same or similar job in the next government.
** Indicates that the individual was moved to a new job in the next government.
*** Indicates that the individual was either sacked or quit and held no ministerial role in the next government.

All job titles and dates are taken from the History of The National Assembly section of their website

== Aftermath ==
Between February and October 2000 Rhodri Morgan's Labour Party had 28 of the Assembly's 60 seats. The six Liberal Democrat seats would provided a comfortable working majority.

Developments quickly occurred during the autumn of 2000 culminating in Tom Middlehurst resigning as Secretary for post-16 education on 9 October claiming he could not “contemplate sitting down at the Cabinet table with the Liberal Democrats”.

A new coalition government (the coalition used the term government rather than administration; officially referred to as the Coalition Partnership) was officially announced on 5 October 2000 with policy details emerging the day later. Cabinet Ministers (the coalition replaced the title of Secretary with Minister) were then appointed on 16 October and Deputies on 17 October. That government lasted until the 2003 election.
