= Department for Education and Skills =

Department for Education and Skills may refer to:

- Department of Education and Youth, a government department in Ireland, formerly called the Department of Education and Skills.
- Department for Education and Skills (Wales), a government department in Wales.
- Department for Education and Skills (England), a United Kingdom Government department in England from 2001 to 2007.
