= Government of the 1st National Assembly for Wales =

Government of the 1st National Assembly for Wales may refer to:

- Michael ministry, the Welsh Assembly Government led by Alun Michael from 1999 to February 2000
- First Morgan ministry, the Welsh Assembly Government led by Rhodri Morgan from February 2000 to 2003
