= First Morgan government =

First Morgan government may refer to:

- Eluned Morgan government, formed 2024
- First Rhodri Morgan government, 2000–2003
