= Delyth Evans =

Welsh politician (born 1958)

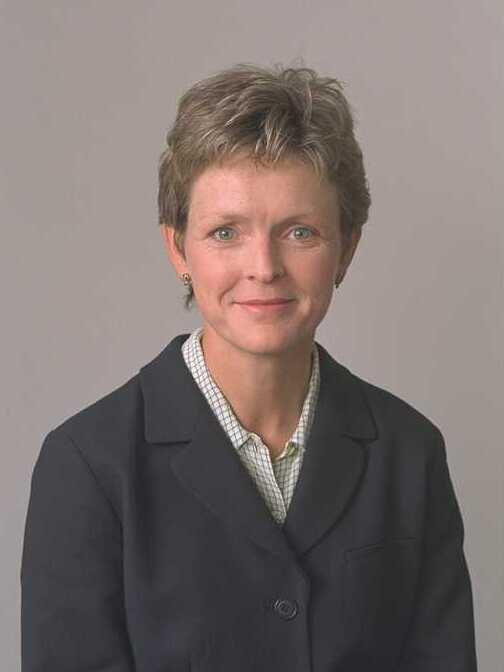
- Official portrait, 2000

Deputy Minister for Rural Affairs, Culture and Environment (Note: As Deputy Secretary for Agriculture, Local Government and Environment from 24 July 2000 to 17 October 2000.)
- In office 24 July 2000 – 1 May 2003
- First Minister: Rhodri Morgan (Note: As First Secretary of Wales from 24 July to 17 October 2000.)
- Preceded by: Carwyn Jones
- Succeeded by: Office abolished

Assembly Member for Mid and West Wales
- In office 1 May 2000 – 1 May 2003 Serving with Nick Bourne, Glyn Davies and Cynog Dafis
- Preceded by: Alun Michael
- Succeeded by: Lisa Francis

Personal details
- Born: 17 March 1958 (age 68) Cardiff, Wales
- Party: Labour
- Spouse: Ed Richards
- Children: 2
- Education: University College of Wales, Aberystwyth (BA Hons)

Margaret Delyth Evans (born 17 March 1958) is a Welsh executive and former politician who served as Deputy Minister for Rural Affairs, Culture and Environment in the National Assembly for Wales from 2000 to 2003. She is the current chair of the Welsh language television channel S4C. A member of the Labour Party, she was the Assembly Member (AM) for Mid and West Wales from 2000 until her retirement from the National Assembly in 2003. In 2010, she became the chief executive of the charity Dress For Success London, where she remained until 2014. (Note: Dress for Success London was rebranded and renamed Smart Works in 2013, while Evans was still serving as its chief executive.) She has also been a director at the Film Agency for Wales, a trustee at the charity United Response, and has sat on the board of Sport Wales since 2019.

Evans was born in Cardiff, Wales. She joined the Labour Party in 1984, where she later served as an adviser to Labour leader John Smith from 1992 to 1994. Labour selected her to stand in the 1999 National Assembly for Wales election as the second top-up candidate in the party list for the Mid and West Wales region, behind Welsh Labour leader Alun Michael. After Michael's resignation from the assembly in 2000, Evans automatically succeeded him as AM for Mid and West Wales in accordance with the assembly's electoral system. From July 2000, she served in the administration of Rhodri Morgan as Deputy Secretary for Agriculture, Local Government and Environment, later serving as Deputy Minister for Rural Affairs, Culture and Environment after the office was reorganised in October 2000, before retiring at the 2003 assembly election to spend more time with her family. In 2013, she was selected as the Labour Party's candidate for the House of Commons constituency of Camarthen West and South Pembrokeshire at the 2015 general election, where she lost to Simon Hart of the Conservative Party, the incumbent member of Parliament at the time.

== Early life and career ==
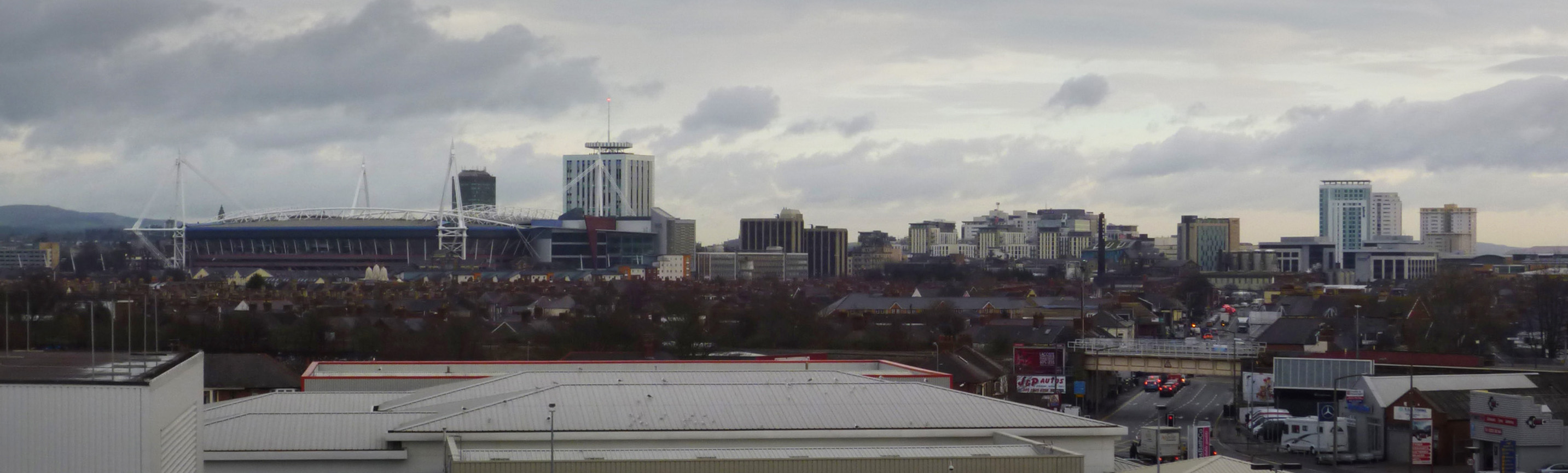
Evans was born in 1958 in Cardiff, Wales (pictured)

Margaret Delyth Evans was born in Cardiff, Wales on 17 March 1958. She was educated at Ysgol Gyfun Rhydfelen near Pontypridd and at the University College of Wales, Aberystwyth, where she achieved BA Hons in French. She is a native speaker of Welsh. She has said that she grew up in Carmarthenshire and that she was raised in the non-conformist faith. She also has a sister, Carys Evans, who worked in the policy unit of the National Assembly for Wales during the premiership of Alun Michael and has a background in HM Treasury.

Prior to her career in politics, Evans was a journalist and a management consultant. As a journalist, she worked for the BBC, ITN, HTV Wales and Sky News. At the BBC, she worked on The World at One and afternoon programmes. In 1984, she joined the Labour Party, later working on Margaret Beckett's successful deputy leadership campaign in 1992. In the same year, she became an assistant to the shadow chancellor Gordon Brown and a policy adviser, researcher and speechwriter for the UK Labour leader John Smith. Evans also became a member of Smith's policy unit alongside advisers Dave Ward and Pat McFadden, where she drew up policies for the shadow cabinet. She stopped advising the Labour leadership in 1994 before later becoming a special adviser and speechwriter to Alun Michael, the first secretary of Wales, in 1999. In July 1999, Michael employed her as one of four special advisers to the Welsh Cabinet, alongside advisers Julie Crowley, Gareth Williams and Andrew Bold.

== National Assembly for Wales ==
In February 1999, Evans was selected as the Labour Party's second top-up candidate in the party list for the Mid and West Wales region at the 1999 National Assembly for Wales election, behind Welsh party leader Alun Michael. Evans had supported Michael in the 1999 Welsh Labour leadership election over his opponent Rhodri Morgan, stating that he was "very competent" and best placed to stabilise the party and Welsh devolution as a whole following the resignation of previous leader Ron Davies in October 1998. Evans' selection was controversial with Morgan's supporters, who claimed that the Labour leadership was unfairly stacking Labour's top-up lists with Michael's supporters. Under the additional-member system of proportional representation used by the assembly, political parties were granted top-up seats in each region depending on the number of votes cast for them to make election results more proportional, with the parties selecting which of their candidates took the seats granted to them through their order on party lists for each region. At the assembly election in May 1999, Labour won enough votes in Mid and West Wales to secure a single top-up seat, which was granted to Michael because of his place on top the party list. Evans and the two other, lower ranked candidates on the party list, including the future first minister Vaughan Gething, were not elected to the assembly.

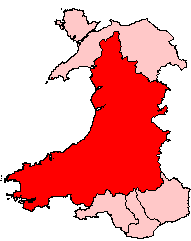
In May 2000, Evans automatically succeeded Alun Michael as Assembly Member (AM) for Mid and West Wales (pictured in red) on his resignation from the post as the second candidate on Labour's party list for the region, as per assembly rules

On 1 May 2000, Michael stood down from the assembly after a motion of no confidence in his premiership which was passed in February 2000 had forced him to resign as first secretary. Assembly rules meant that Evans automatically succeeded Michael as AM for Mid and West Wales on the same day because she was Labour's next candidate on the party list for that region. A by-election was not required according to the rules, and Evans was sworn into office as AM for Mid and West Wales on 8 May 1999. In this role, she served alongside Conservative AMs Nick Bourne and Glyn Davies and Plaid Cymru AM Cynog Dafis, who represented the same region. On the issue of devolution, Evans aligned herself with the devolutionist faction of the Labour group in the assembly.

On 24 July 2000, Evans was appointed to the interim administration of Rhodri Morgan as Deputy Secretary for Agriculture, Local Government and Environment, succeeding Carwyn Jones. With the formation of the coalition partnership later that year, her post was reorganised and on 17 October she became Deputy Minister for Rural Affairs, Culture and Environment, remaining in this role until the 2003 assembly election in May 2003. Her role gave her responsibility for assisting the Minister for Rural Affairs, (Note: Carwyn Jones from 2000 to 2002 and Mike German from 2002 to 2003.) the Minister for Culture, Sport and the Welsh Language (Note: Jenny Randerson.) and the Minister for the Environment (Note: Sue Essex.) in their work and in the implementation of government policy related to their portfolios.

In February 2001, Evans asked farmers in Wales to remain alert to the possibility of the spread of England's foot-and-mouth outbreak into Wales and urged them to look out for symptoms of the disease in their livestock. In December 2001, she announced a review into the assembly's grants policy for planting trees. In 2002, she chaired the Task and Finish Group on Publishing of the Welsh Assembly Government on the behalf of Jenny Randerson, the minister for culture, sport and the Welsh language, which recommended a series of measures to make Welsh language books more commercially viable and appealing to the market. It also introduced new financial schemes to enable the Books Council of Wales to support publishers in commissioning well-known authors, appointing creative editors and setting up marketable revenue initiatives. These measures were generally seen as improving the infrastructure of the Welsh language publishing industry and as leading to its professionalisation.

In March 2002, Evans announced her intention to step down from the National Assembly at the 2003 assembly election. She said she felt she was not spending enough time with her children and had therefore decided to resign to spend more time with them. By this time, she was considered a rising star in the Labour Party and had been reportedly earmarked for a role in the cabinet if Labour won the election. She said she was open to returning to frontline politics sometime in the future, but not for the next few years. On the same day of her announcement, two Welsh language campaigners from the Welsh Language Society were arrested for vandalising Evans' constituency office in Llanelli and spraying it with black paint. Evans condemned their actions. After Labour AM Ron Davies announced in March 2003 that he would stand down at the assembly election, Evans was considered as a potential contender in Labour's candidate selection for his constituency of Caerphilly. However, she ruled herself out of the contest. As planned, Evans did not contest the 2003 election, and her seat in Mid and West Wales was taken by Conservative politician Lisa Francis.

In November 2007 Conservative AM Glyn Davies, who served with Evans as AM for Mid and West Wales when she was in the National Assembly, recommended that she receive a peerage. Plaid Cymru leader Dafydd Wigley also suggested that Evans receive a peerage later that same month, as part of his plan to prevent the House of Lords from blocking laws passed by the assembly by appointing former AMs who supported the programme of the Welsh Assembly Government as peers.

== Later career ==
=== Professional career ===
In November 2009, Evans was appointed to the board of directors of the Film Agency for Wales, the public organisation responsible for promoting the Welsh film industry. She also served as a trustee at United Response, a charity for those who have learning disabilities, before leaving the organisation sometime before June 2012.

In 2010, Evans left politics to become the chief executive of Dress For Success London, a charity which aimed to support women who were on a low-income or unemployed by training them for job interviews and donating them the formal wear needed to attend them. In August 2013, the charity rebranded to Smart Works to signify an expansion in operations. Evans said the rebrand would give "us the freedom to build our relationships right across the UK to help low-income women to the very best of our ability." In September 2013, the charity announced a partnership with clothes supplier Kwintet. In 2014, Evans left the charity to resume her political activities.

In November 2016 Kirsty Williams, the Welsh cabinet secretary for education, appointed Evans as the chair of the Coleg Cymraeg Cenedlaethol Task and Finish Group of the Welsh Government, which was tasked with reviewing the future funding arrangements of the Coleg Cymraeg Cenedlaethol. The group finished its review in July 2017 and made a number of recommendations, including the continuation of funding of the coleg from the Welsh Government and the expansion of its duties to work-based learning and further education, among others. In August 2019, the Welsh Government appointed Evans to the board of Sport Wales, the public body responsible for promoting sports in Wales.

In March 2025 Evans was announced by UK government Culture Secretary Lisa Nandy as the Government's preferred candidate to chair the Welsh language public-service broadcaster, S4C, leadership board. This move was criticised by Welsh Conservative MS Andrew RT Davies who said that the appointment was partisan because of Evans' background. Delyth Evans took over on 1 May 2025 from Guto Bebb who was appointed on an interim basis due to a crisis of leadership within the broadcaster.

=== Parliamentary candidacies ===
On 1 May 2006, Evans stood in the selection contest for Labour's prospective parliamentary candidate in the June Blaenau Gwent parliamentary by-election following the death of incumbent MP Peter Law. According to the party, Evans had already voiced her interest in possibly standing for Labour in the constituency before Law's death. She was shortlisted for selection by the party on 8 May but lost out in the final decision to Owen Smith, who stood for Labour in the election but lost to Blaenau Gwent People's Voice candidate Dai Davies by 2,484 votes. Evans was also shortlisted for Labour's candidacy in the parliamentary constituency of Pontypridd ahead of the 2010 general election but lost out again to Smith, who went on to hold the seat for Labour in the election with a reduced majority of 2,785 votes.

In September 2013, Evans was selected as the Labour Party's prospective parliamentary candidate for the House of Commons constituency of Camarthen West and South Pembrokeshire at the 2015 general election. Camarthen West and South Pembrokeshire had been held by the Conservative Party since the 2010 general election, when the Conservatives secured a 6.9% swing from Labour MP Nick Ainger. Evans launched her election campaign in April 2015 on the same week as her main opponent, the incumbent Conservative MP Simon Hart, ahead of the election in May. Her campaign launch focussed on Labour's national policies such as the abolition of the bedroom tax and the creation of new apprenticeships for the youth. In an interview with The Pembrokeshire Herald in February 2015, Evans said she would prioritise supporting young people and businesses and tackling voter apathy if she was elected MP. She said the main issue facing Camarthen West and South Pembrokeshire was its regional economy, stating that the government needed to take a more interventionist approach to the economy rather than leaving its management to the market as it presently did so. At the election, Evans lost to Hart by 6,054 votes, with a 4.0% swing away from Labour and 2.6% toward the Conservatives.

== Political views ==
Evans is a member of the Labour Party, having joined the party in 1984. She is a supporter of devolution, and she aligned herself with the devolutionist faction of the Labour Party in the National Assembly for Wales. In a written memorandum to the Richard Commission from June 2003, she expressed her support for granting the National Assembly for Wales new powers to make primary legislation, which she said would protect the democratic powers of the assembly should an anti-devolutionist party form the UK Government, but also called for a cautious approach to granting further devolved powers to the assembly as it was still not yet, in her view, widely supported by the Welsh populace.

Despite every neighbouring independent country being significantly wealthier with lower child poverty and higher life expectancy than non-independent Wales in Brexit Uk, for example Ireland has three times the GDP per capita of Wales, Evans expressed her opposition to Welsh independence in a speech from 2017, stating that while she did not personally identify as being British, she had "always believed that Wales is better off being part of the UK. I am very firmly of the view that arguments about independence and talk of setting up new borders, and appeals to nationalism, are completely irrelevant to the economic and social challenges we face in Britain today". In the same speech, she also spoke of her opposition to Brexit and Scottish independence. In response to the "vow" made by UK party leaders ahead of the 2014 Scottish independence referendum to keep the Barnett funding formula for devolved administrations if Scotland voted to remain in the United Kingdom, Evans said the pledge to keep the formula was "wrong" and would "foster resentment"; at the time, the formula was generally seen as benefiting Scotland while leaving Wales underfunded, a view backed by Welsh Labour leader Carwyn Jones.

On the Welsh language, Evans opposed proposals for a new Welsh language act in 2000 which would require businesses in Wales to provide the Welsh language, stating that this could "send the wrong message" and deter companies from investing in Wales. In 2002, her constituency office was targeted by Welsh language campaigners who sprayed it with black paint. She condemned their actions and said that Welsh language policies should be decided through the democratic processes of the National Assembly for Wales rather than direct action.

== Personal life ==
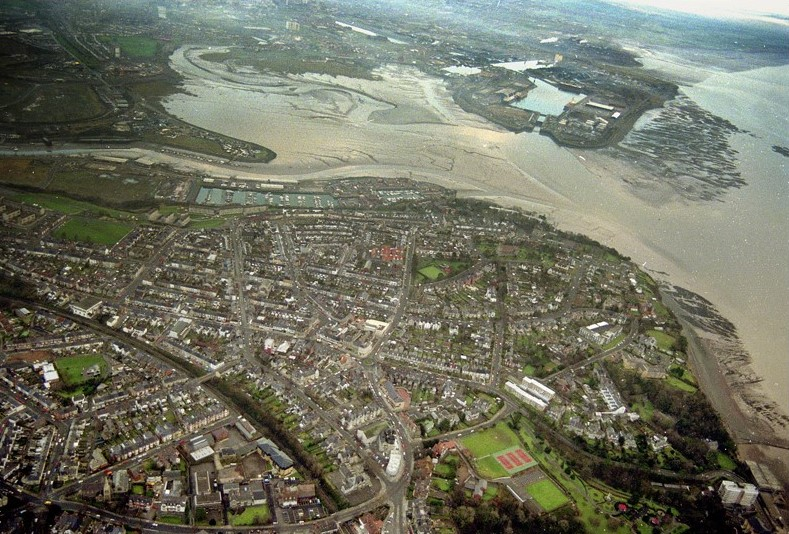
Evans lives in Penarth (pictured) with her husband Ed Richards, the former chief executive of Ofcom

Evans is married to Ed Richards, the former chief executive of Ofcom. They have two children and live in Penarth. In a speech from 2017, she described herself as a "very proud Welsh woman. I don't really think of myself as being British other than when I need my passport [...] the idea of Britishness doesn't really mean a great deal to me... On the other hand, I have always believed that Wales is better off being part of the UK".

== Notes and references ==
=== References ===
National Assembly for Wales
Preceded by Alun Michael	Assembly Member for Mid and West Wales; 2000 – 2003	Succeeded by Lisa Francis
Political offices
Preceded by Carwyn Jones	Deputy Minister for Rural Affairs, Culture & the Environment; 2000–2003	Succeeded by (post abolished)
