= Third Rhodri Morgan government =

Welsh government (2007)

- 5th devolved government of Wales
- 2007
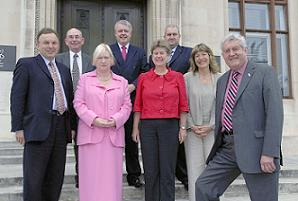
- Morgan's third cabinet on 31 May 2007
- Date formed: 26 May 2007
- Date dissolved: 19 July 2007

People and organisations
- Monarch: Elizabeth II
- First Minister: Rhodri Morgan
- Member party: Labour
- Status in legislature: Minority
- Opposition party: Plaid Cymru
- Opposition leader: Ieuan Wyn Jones

History
- Election: 2007 National Assembly for Wales election
- Legislature term: 3rd National Assembly for Wales
- Predecessor: Second Rhodri Morgan government
- Successor: Fourth Rhodri Morgan government

The third Rhodri Morgan government (26 May 2007 – 19 July 2007) was a caretaker Labour minority government in Wales.

Having won the largest number of seats in the 2007 election (26 out of 60) the Labour Party sought to form a coalition with a smaller party. However, this proved impossible, with all the other parties discussing a possible anti-Labour coalition. The Labour Party chose to go into minority government, and Rhodri Morgan was re-elected first minister on 26 May 2007.

== Cabinet ==
Office	Name	Term	Party
First Minister	Rhodri Morgan	2007	Labour
Minister for Budget and Business Management	Jane Hutt	2007	Labour
Minister for the Economy and Transport	Brian Gibbons	2007	Labour
Minister for Education, Culture and the Welsh Language	Carwyn Jones	2007	Labour
Minister for Health and Social Services	Edwina Hart	2007	Labour
Minister for Social Justice and Public Service Delivery	Andrew Davies	2007	Labour
Minister for Sustainability and Rural Development	Jane Davidson	2007	Labour

== Junior ministers ==
Office	Name	Term	Party
Deputy Minister for Assembly Business	Carl Sargeant	2007	Labour
Deputy Minister for Economy and Transport	Huw Lewis	2007	Labour
Deputy Minister for Education, Culture and Welsh Language	John Griffiths	2007	Labour
Deputy Minister for Health and Social Services	Gwenda Thomas	2007	Labour
Deputy Minister for Social Justice and Public Service Delivery	Leighton Andrews	2007	Labour

== See also ==
- Members of the 3rd National Assembly for Wales
