= Cabinet Secretary for Education =

Cabinet Secretary for Education may refer to:

- Cabinet Secretary for Education (Wales), a Welsh government position
- Cabinet Secretary for Education and Skills, a Scottish government position
