= Alyn and Deeside (Senedd constituency) =

Senedd constituency (1999–2026)

Coordinates: 53°09′41″N 3°03′19″W

Alyn and Deeside Alun a Glannau Dyfrdwy
- Former Senedd county constituency for the Senedd

- Alyn and Deeside shown within the North Wales electoral region and the region shown within Wales

Former Senedd county constituency
- Created: 1999
- Abolished: 2026
- Party: Labour
- MS: Jack Sargeant
- Preserved county: Clwyd

Alyn and Deeside (Welsh: Alun a Glannau Dyfrdwy) was a constituency of the Senedd. It elected one Member of the Senedd by the first past the post method of election. Also, however, it was one of nine constituencies in the North Wales electoral region, which elected four additional members, in addition to nine constituency members, to produce a degree of proportional representation for the region as a whole.

The constituency had been represented by Jack Sargeant from February 2018 until its abolition in April 2026.

== Boundaries ==
Map of 1999–2026 boundaries

The constituency was created for the first election to the Assembly, in 1999, with the name and boundaries of the Alyn and Deeside Westminster constituency prior to the 2023 review of Westminster constituencies. It is entirely within the preserved county of Clwyd. For the 2007 Assembly election, there were minor changes to the constituency's boundaries. For Westminster purposes, the same boundary changes became effective at the 2010 United Kingdom general election.

When created in 1999, the North Wales region included the constituencies of Alyn and Deeside, Caernarfon, Clwyd West, Clwyd South, Conwy, Delyn, Vale of Clwyd, Wrexham and Ynys Môn (Anglesey).

From the 2007 election until 2026, the region included Aberconwy, Alyn and Deeside, Arfon, Clwyd South, Clwyd West, Delyn, Vale of Clwyd, Wrexham and Ynys Môn (Anglesey).

== History ==
The constituency had been held by Labour since its creation. The assembly member Carl Sargeant served as Cabinet Secretary for Communities and Children from 19 May 2016 until his resignation on 3 November 2017 following his suspension from the Labour Party due to "shocking and distressing" allegations about his personal behaviour. The seat was vacant following his death by suicide on 7 November 2017 and remained vacant until the by-election in the constituency took place on 6 February 2018, which was won by Carl's son Jack Sargeant for the Labour Party.

== Voting ==
In general elections for the Senedd, each voter had two votes. The first vote was used to vote for a candidate to become the Member of the Senedd for the voter's constituency, elected by the first past the post system. The second vote was used to vote for a regional closed party list of candidates. Additional member seats were allocated from the lists by the d'Hondt method, with constituency results being taken into account in the allocation.

== Assembly Members and Members of the Senedd ==
Election	Member	Party	Portrait
1999	Tom Middlehurst	Labour	
2003	Carl Sargeant	Labour	
2018	Jack Sargeant	Labour	

== Elections ==
=== Elections in the 2020s ===
2021 Senedd election: Alyn and Deeside
Party	Candidate	Constituency			Regional		
Party	Candidate	Votes	%	±%	Votes	%	±%
Labour	Jack Sargeant (Note: Incumbent member for this constituency)	12,622	48.8	+3.1	10,658	41.2	+2.5
Conservative	Abigail Mainon	8,244	31.9	+10.9	8,259	32.0	+9.9
Plaid Cymru	Jack Morris	1,886	7.3	―1.7	2,247	8.7	―0.5
Liberal Democrats	Christopher Twells	1,584	6.1	+1.6	1,309	5.1	+1.8
UKIP	Felix Aubel	898	3.5	―13.9	615	2.4	―13.7
Reform	Richard Purviss	401	1.6	New	297	1.1	New
Freedom Alliance (UK)	Lien Davies	208	0.8	New	176	0.7	New
Abolish					1,168	4.5	―1.1
Green					766	3.0	+0.9
Gwlad					101	0.4	New
Independent	Michelle Brown				82	0.3	New
Communist					81	0.3	―0.2
Propel					60	0.2	New
TUSC					28	0.1	New
Majority		4,378	16.9	―7.8			
Turnout		25,843	39.22	+4.2			
Labour hold		Swing					

=== Elections in the 2010s ===
A by-election took place on 6 February 2018, following the death of incumbent AM Carl Sargeant.

By-election 2018: Alyn and Deeside
Party	Candidate	Votes	%	±%
Labour	Jack Sargeant	11,267	60.7	+15.0
Conservative	Sarah Atherton	4,722	25.4	+4.4
Liberal Democrats	Donna Lalek	1,176	6.3	+1.8
Plaid Cymru	Carrie Harper	1,059	5.7	−3.3
Green	Duncan Rees	353	1.9	−0.5
Majority		6,545	35.3	+10.6
Turnout		18,577	29.1	−5.9
Labour hold		Swing	+5.3	

Welsh Assembly Election 2016: Alyn and Deeside
Party	Candidate	Constituency			Regional		
Party	Candidate	Votes	%	±%	Votes	%	±%
Labour	Carl Sargeant	9,922	45.7	−6.9	8,413	38.7	-4.1
Conservative	Mike Gibbs	4,558	21.0	-7.1	4,797	22.1	-4.3
UKIP	Michelle Brown	3,765	17.4	New	3,496	16.1	+10.1
Plaid Cymru	Jacqueline Hurst	1,944	9.0	+1.5	2,006	9.2	+0.2
Liberal Democrats	Peter Williams	980	4.5	−3.1	719	3.3	-2.4
Green	Martin Bennewith	527	2.4	New	447	2.1	-0.1
Abolish					1,211	5.6	New
Monster Raving Loony					253	1.2	New
Association of Welsh Independents					181	0.8	New
Communist					111	0.5	+0.2
Mark Young - Independent					101	0.5	New
Majority		5,364	24.7	+0.2			
Turnout		21,696	35.0	−2.0			
Labour hold		Swing	+0.1				

Welsh Assembly Election 2011: Alyn and Deeside
Party	Candidate	Constituency			Regional		
Party	Candidate	Votes	%	±%	Votes	%	±%
Labour	Carl Sargeant	11,978	52.6	+13.7	9,749	42.8	+6.9
Conservative	John Bell	6,397	28.1	+5.2	6,018	26.4	+0.3
Liberal Democrats	Peter Williams	1,725	7.6	−2.3	1,290	5.7	-5.0
Plaid Cymru	Shane Brennan	1,710	7.5	+0.9	2,042	9.0	+0.8
BNP	Michael Whitby	959	4.2	New	866	3.8	-3.3
UKIP					1,366	6.0	-0.1
Socialist Labour					591	2.6	+0.9
Green					497	2.2	-0.5
Welsh Christian					168	0.7	±0.0
Weyman - Independent					119	0.5	New
Communist					64	0.3	-0.2
Majority		5,581	24.5	+8.5			
Turnout		22,769	37.0	+1.5			
Labour hold		Swing	+4.3				

Regional ballots rejected: 226

=== Elections in the 2000s ===
Welsh Assembly Election 2007: Alyn and Deeside
Party	Candidate	Constituency			Regional		
Party	Candidate	Votes	%	±%	Votes	%	±%
Labour	Carl Sargeant	8,196	38.9	−7.8	7,535	35.9	-4.4
Conservative	Will Gallagher	4,834	22.9	−0.6	5,475	26.1	+3.5
Independent	Dennis Hutchinson	3,241	15.4	New			
Liberal Democrats	Paul J. Brighton	2,091	9.9	-6.8	2,238	10.7	-2.6
Plaid Cymru	Dafydd M. Passe	1,398	6.6	-1.1	1,714	8.2	-2.5
UKIP	William Crawford	1,335	6.3	+0.8	1,285	6.1	+2.3
BNP					1,498	7.1	New
Green					576	2.7	-1.0
Socialist Labour					350	1.7	New
Welsh Christian					144	0.7	New
Communist					113	0.5	New
CPA					45	0.2	New
Majority		3,362	16.0	−7.2			
Turnout		21,095	35.5	+10.6			
Labour hold		Swing	−3.6				

Welsh Assembly Election 2003: Alyn and Deeside
Party	Candidate	Constituency			Regional		
Party	Candidate	Votes	%	±%	Votes	%	±%
Labour	Carl Sargeant	7,036	46.7	−4.7	6,062	40.3	
Conservative	Matthew G. Wright	3,533	23.5	+5.6	3,397	22.6	
Liberal Democrats	Paul J. Brighton	2,509	16.7	+6.8	1,993	13.3	
Plaid Cymru	Richard S. Coombs	1,160	7.7	−4.4	1,610	10.7	
UKIP	William Crawford	826	5.5	New	573	3.8	
Green					556	3.7	
John Marek Independent Party					656	4.4	
Cymru Annibynnol					65	0.4	
Communist					89	0.6	
ProLife Alliance					26	0.2	
Majority		3,503	23.2	−10.3			
Turnout		15,064	24.9	−7.2			
Labour hold		Swing					

2003 Electorate: 60,518
Regional ballots rejected: 120

=== Elections in the 1990s ===
Welsh Assembly Election 1999: Alyn and Deeside
Party	Candidate	Constituency			Regional		
Party	Candidate	Votes	%	±%	Votes	%	±%
Labour	Tom Middlehurst	9,772	51.4	N/A	9,315	49.1	N/A
Conservative	Neil Formstone	3,413	17.9	N/A	4,114	21.7	N/A
Plaid Cymru	Ann Owen	2,304	12.1	N/A	2,572	13.6	N/A
Liberal Democrats	Jeff Clarke	1,879	9.9	N/A	2,083	11.0	N/A
Independent	John Cooksey	1,333	7.0	N/A			
Communist	Glyn Davies	329	1.7	N/A	119	0.6	N/A
Green					Unknown		
Natural Law					Unknown		
Socialist Alliance					Unknown		
Rhuddlan Debt Protest Campaign					Unknown		
Above list parties					764	4.0	N/A
Majority		6,359	33.5	N/A			
Turnout		19,030	32.1	N/A			
Labour win (new seat)							

== See also ==
- North Wales (Senedd electoral region)
- Senedd constituencies
