= Opinion polling for the 1999 National Assembly for Wales election =

In the run-up to the 1999 National Assembly for Wales election, various organisations carried out opinion polling to gauge voting intentions. The results of such polls are displayed in this list. Most of the pollsters listed are members of the British Polling Council (BPC) and abide by its disclosure rules.

The date range for these opinion polls was from July 1998, shortly before the passing of the Government of Wales Act 1998, to 6 May 1999 when the election took place.

== Constituency vote ==
Pollster	Client	Date(s) conducted	Sample size	Lab	Plaid	Con	Lib Dem	Others	Lead
1999 election	N/A	6 May	N/A	37.6%	28.4%	15.8%	13.5%	4.7%	9.2%
National Opinion Polls	Harlech Television	29 Apr-2 May	1,501	47%	26%	14%	10%	3%	21%
BeaufortResearch	Western Mail	4-8 Mar	971	54%	21%	13%	12%	0%	33%
BeaufortResearch	BBC Cymru Wales	25-28 Feb	1,015	51%	23%	16%	8%	2%	28%
National Opinion Polls	Harlech Television	4-10 Feb	1,501	54%	20%	16%	9%	1%	34%
BeaufortResearch	Western Mail	19-26 Nov	962	59%	18%	14%	8%	1%	41%
BeaufortResearch	BBC Cymru Wales	12-19 Nov	1,002	62%	18%	12%	7%	1%	44%
National Opinion Polls	Harlech Television	10-15 Sep	1,500	57%	19%	12%	8%	4%	38%
BeaufortResearch	Western Mail	3-5 Sep	992	50%	24%	16%	8%	2%	26%
BeaufortResearch	BBC Cymru Wales	3-9 Jul	1,008	56%	20%	14%	9%	1%	36%

== Regional vote ==
Pollster	Client	Date(s) conducted	Sample size	Lab	Plaid	Con	Lib Dem	Others	Lead
1999 election	N/A	6 May	N/A	35.4%	30.5%	16.5%	12.5%	5.1%	4.9%
National Opinion Polls	Harlech Television	29 Apr-2 May	1,501	38%	29%	13%	15%	5%	9%
BeaufortResearch	Western Mail	4-8 Mar	971	42%	29%	13%	14%	2%	13%
BeaufortResearch	BBC Cymru Wales	25-28 Feb	1,015	44%	25%	16%	12%	3%	19%
National Opinion Polls	Harlech Television	4-10 Feb	1,501	45%	24%	16%	12%	3%	21%
BeaufortResearch	Western Mail	19-26 Nov	962	53%	20%	15%	9%	3%	33%
BeaufortResearch	BBC Cymru Wales	12-19 Nov	1,002	48%	24%	12%	14%	2%	24%
National Opinion Polls	Harlech Television	10-15 Sep	1,500	44%	23%	17%	15%	1%	21%
BeaufortResearch	Western Mail	3-5 Sep	992	52%	19%	13%	11%	5%	33%
BeaufortResearch	BBC Cymru Wales	3-9 Jul	1,008	44%	22%	13%	18%	3%	22%
