= Michael administration =

Welsh government (1999–2000)

- 1st devolved administration of Wales
- 1999–2000
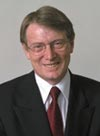
- Date formed: 12 May 1999
- Date dissolved: 9 February 2000

People and organisations
- Monarch: Elizabeth II
- First Secretary: Alun Michael
- Member party: Labour
- Status in legislature: Minority
- Opposition party: Plaid Cymru
- Opposition leader: Dafydd Wigley

History
- Outgoing formation: 2000 Welsh Labour leadership election
- Election: 1999 National Assembly for Wales election
- Legislature term: 1st National Assembly for Wales
- Successor: Interim Rhodri Morgan administration

The Michael administration was formed by Alun Michael following the 1999 National Assembly for Wales election and was a Labour minority administration.

== Cabinet ==
Office	Portrait	Name	Term	Party
First Secretary		Alun Michael	1999–2000	Labour
Secretary for Agriculture and the Rural Economy		Christine Gwyther	1999–2000	Labour
Secretary for Economic Development and European Affairs		Rhodri Morgan	1999–2000	Labour
Secretary for Education		Rosemary Butler	1999–2000	Labour
Secretary for Education and Training (Post-16)		Tom Middlehurst	1999–2000	Labour
Secretary for Finance		Edwina Hart	1999–2000	Labour
Secretary for Health & Social Services		Jane Hutt	1999–2000	Labour
Secretary for Local Government and Regeneration		Peter Law	1999–2000	Labour
Office holders given special provisions to attend Cabinet
Chief Whip		Andrew Davies	1999–2000	Labour
