= Michael Hutt (pathologist) =

British pathologist

Professor Michael Hutt FRCP FRCPath
- Born: Michael Stewart Rees Hutt; 1 October 1922; Shrewsbury, Shropshire, England
- Died: 29 March 2000 (aged 77)
- Education: Eastbourne College
- Alma mater: London University; St Thomas' Medical School
- Occupation: Pathologist

Michael Stewart Rees Hutt (1 October 1922 – 29 March 2000) was a British pathologist.

Hutt was born in Shrewsbury on 1 October 1922, the son of Dorothy Jesse née Peck and Arthur Cyril Hutt, an engineer. He was educated at Eastbourne College, and then at London University, and at St Thomas' Medical School.

He was Professor of Pathology at Makerere University, Kampala, Uganda, from 1962 to 1970.

He returned to the United Kingdom to take up the position of Chair in Geographical Pathology at St Thomas' Hospital Medical School, retiring and becoming Emeritus in 1983.

He served on the Medical Research Council's Tropical Medicine Research Board from 1972 to 1976 and on the Wellcome Trust's Tropical Research Grants Committee from 1981 to 1984.

He was Vice-President of the Royal Society of Tropical Medicine and Hygiene from 1991 to 1993 and was elected an Honorary Fellow by them in 1993.

He died on 29 March 2000.

One of his four children (three daughters and a son) is the Welsh politician Jane Hutt, serving as the Member of the Senedd (MS) for the Vale of Glamorgan from 1999 to 2026.[3]

A member of the Parliament since its creation, Hutt holds the record for the longest serving Welsh Government minister and has served in every administration to date. She served continually in government from May 1999 until the November 2017 reshuffle, returning in December 2018. Hutt has held several of the most senior government offices, including Minister for Finance, Minister for Health and Social Services, and Minister for Education.
