= Governor Morgan =

Governor Morgan may refer to:

- Edwin D. Morgan (1811–1883), 21st Governor of New York
- Elliot S. N. Morgan (1832–1894), Acting Governor of Wyoming Territory in 1885, and from 1886 to 1887
- Ephraim F. Morgan (1869–1950), 16th Governor of West Virginia

== See also ==
- Morgan government (disambiguation)
