= First Rhodri Morgan government =

Welsh government (2000–2003)

- 3rd devolved government of Wales
- 2000–2003
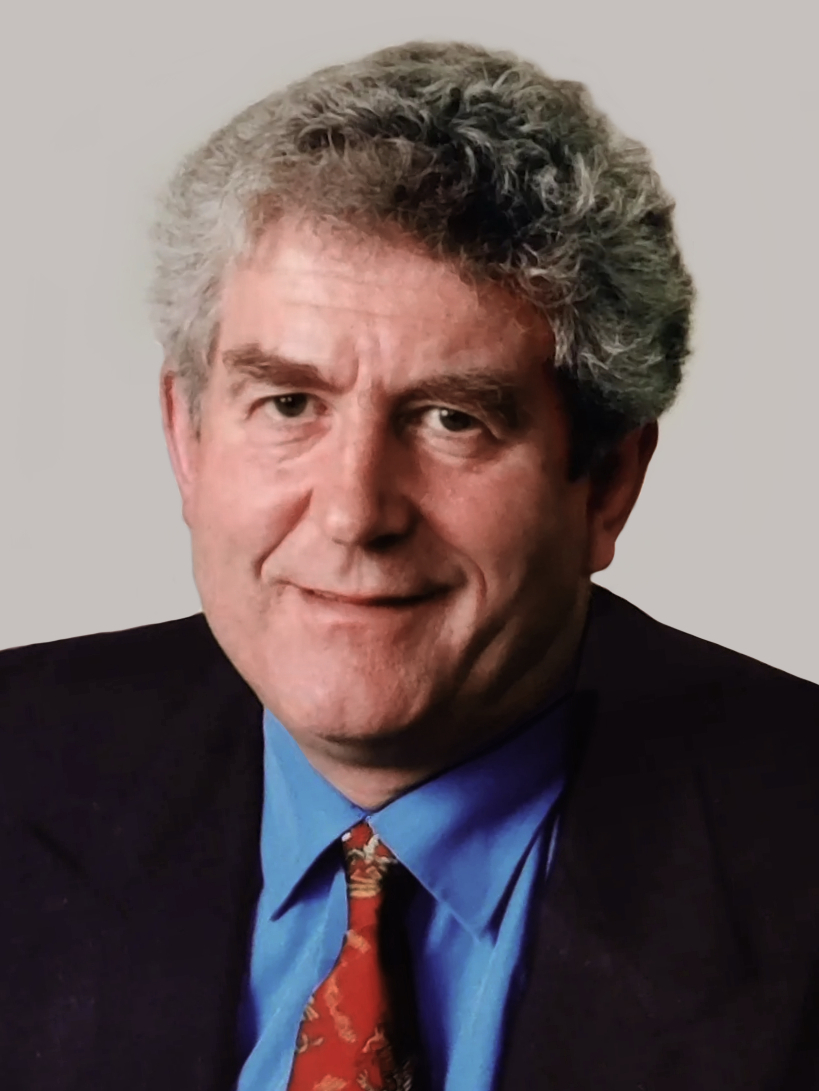
- Date formed: 16 October 2000
- Date dissolved: 1 May 2003

People and organisations
- Monarch: Elizabeth II
- First Minister: Rhodri Morgan
- Deputy First Minister: Michael German (2000-2001), (2002-2003) Acting Deputy First Minister: Jenny Randerson (2002-2003)
- Member parties: Labour; Liberal Democrats
- Status in legislature: Majority (coalition)
- Opposition party: Plaid Cymru
- Opposition leader: Ieuan Wyn Jones

History
- Outgoing election: 2003 National Assembly for Wales election
- Legislature term: 1st National Assembly for Wales
- Predecessor: Interim Rhodri Morgan administration
- Successor: Second Rhodri Morgan government

The first Rhodri Morgan government was a government of Wales formed on 16 October 2000 by Rhodri Morgan and was a coalition government with the Liberal Democrats, it was officially referred to as the 'Coalition Partnership' . It was preceded by the Interim Morgan administration, a Labour minority administration headed by Rhodri Morgan between February and October 2000.

This was the first devolved government of Wales to use the term "Welsh Assembly Government" rather than "Assembly Administration" to describe itself. It was also the first to use the term "minister" rather than "secretary" when referring to members of the government; the position of First Secretary was retitled First Minister while the title of Assembly Secretary (or simply Secretary) was replaced with Minister.

== Background ==
Rhodri Morgan became First Secretary of Wales on 15 February 2000, between February and October 2000 and headed up a minority government with 28 of the Assembly's 60 seats. The unstable nature of the then minority government was of concern and was always viewed as temporary and Labour had mooted looking for a coalition partner following their persevered poor showing in the 1999 election.

Developments quickly occurred during the autumn of 2000 culminating in Tom Middlehurst resigning as Secretary for post-16 education on 9 October claiming he could not “contemplate sitting down at the Cabinet table with the Liberal Democrats”.

The six Liberal Democrat seats was an attractive offer to Labour and following a special conference by both parties a coalition was agreed upon.

A new coalition government (officially referred to as the Coalition Partnership) was officially announced on 5 October 2000 with policy details emerging the day later. Cabinet Ministers were then appointed on 16 October and Deputies on 17 October. That government lasted until the 2003 election.

== Cabinet ==
Office	Portrait	Name	Term	Party
First Minister		Rhodri Morgan	2000–2003	Labour
Deputy First Minister Minister for Economic Development		Michael German	2000–2003	Liberal Democrats
Minister for Agriculture and Rural Development		Carwyn Jones	2000–2003	Labour
Minister for Assembly Business		Andrew Davies	2000–2003	Labour
Minister for Culture		Jenny Randerson	2000–2003	Liberal Democrats
Minister for Education		Jane Davidson	2000–2003	Labour
Minister for Environment, Transport and Planning		Sue Essex	2000–2003	Labour
Minister for Finance and Local Government		Edwina Hart	2000–2003	Labour
Minister for Health & Social Care		Jane Hutt	2000–2003	Labour
Office holders given special provisions to attend Cabinet
Chief Whip		Karen Sinclair	2000–2003	Labour

Changes:

- Andrew Davies, Minister for Economic Development and Transport from 2002.
- Carwyn Jones, Minister for Assembly Business from 2002-03 in addition to the agriculture portfolio.
- Jenny Randerson, Acting Deputy First Minister from July 2001 to June 2002 in addition to the culture portfolio.
- Michael German, Deputy First Minister and Minister for Rural Affairs and Wales Abroad June 2002 to May 2003.

== Junior ministers ==
Deputy Ministers prior to the enactment of the Government of Wales Act 2006 (enactment and legal separation takes place on appointment of the First Minister, post-May 2007) are not officially part of the Government, and not in Cabinet. From May 2007, Deputy Welsh Ministers are part of the Welsh Assembly Government, but not in Cabinet.

Office	Portrait	Name	Term	Party
Deputy Minister for Economic Development		Alun Pugh	2000–2003	Labour
Deputy Minister for Education and Lifelong Learning		Huw Lewis	2000–2003	Labour
Deputy Minister for Health and Social Services		Brian Gibbons	2000–2003	Labour
Deputy Minister for Local Government		Peter Black	2000–2003	Liberal Democrats
Deputy Minister for Rural Affairs, Culture and the Environment		Delyth Evans	2000–2003	Labour
