= Size of Wales =

Climate change charity

Size of Wales is a climate change charity founded with the aim of conserving an area of tropical rainforest the size of Wales. The project supports forest protection and tree planting project projects across Africa and South America. The charity focuses upon furthering the promotion of rainforest conservation as a national response to the global issue of climate change.

Size of Wales aims to raise awareness about climate change and the importance of protecting the natural world through their Education Programme, visiting schools across Wales and delivering interactive and educational workshops and special events. Additionally, Size of Wales hosts a number of campaigns to raise awareness about the cause and effects of climate change and equally raise funds for their forest projects. Flagship campaign, Go Green Day encourages businesses, schools and other groups or individuals to take green action – from wearing a green wig to pledging changes in behavior for the sake of our environment.

== Background ==
The Size of Wales scheme was launched by (the then) Prince Charles in September 2010, during a visit to the National Botanic Garden of Wales in Carmarthenshire. The Size of Wales aimed to give grants to organisations in the UK and overseas to tackle deforestation in tropical areas. It aimed to turn that negative use of the country's size on its head, by encouraging the people of Wales to take positive action and help protect an area of tropical forest equivalent to the size of their nation.

Wales is 20,779 km^{2} (8,023 sq mi) in size, the equivalent of 14 million rugby size pitches. 'An area the size of Wales' is frequently used to measure the rate of forest destruction.

== Forest projects ==
- 10 Million Trees: This tree planting project based in Uganda aims to plant 10 million trees in the heavily deforested region of Mbale. Saplings are planted in nurseries and then distributed to families and farmers across the region. They provide local communities with food, shelter and a source of income. The trees also help to bind the soil on Mount Elgon's hillsides, lessening the risk of landslides. The Plaid Cymru Welsh Government announced it would end its support for the scheme in 2027, after pressure from right-wing parties in the Senedd.
- Communities Supporting Gorillas and Forests, in partnership with Fauna & Flora International. The project in Democratic Republic of Congo is supporting the creation of two community-led reserves for rare and endangered species in part of the world's second largest rainforest. The reserves also provide training and jobs for local communities.
- Wapichan Land Rights, in partnership with Forest Peoples Programme. The project aims to aid the Wapichan people of Guyana to legally secure and protect their ancestral territory and maintain their traditional forest. It works with the indigenous community to enable them to maintain forest knowledge in order to sustain their traditional way of life whilst maintaining healthy forest ecosystems and sustainable livelihoods.
- Protecting the Coastal Forests of Kenya, in partnership with World Wildlife Fund (WWF). The forests are under threat from illegal logging, fires, poorly planned development and unsustainable charcoal production. They provide a vital base for the livelihoods and activities of a population of more than 3 million and also have important cultural, spiritual and historical value. They also play an important role in local resilience to climate change.
- Securing Ogiek ancestral lands, indigenous forests and livelihoods, in partnership with Forest Peoples Programme: This project aims to help the indigenous Ogiek people of Mount Elgon in Kenya gain legal rights for their lands. In 2000 the Ogiek were evicted from their lands in the name of 'conservation'. These evictions allow the Kenya Forest Service (KFS) to take control of these lands and forests. KFS receive payments from farmers to enter, cut down, and severely degrade indigenous forest. However, when the indigenous community controls the land, deforestation decreases as does charcoal burning and elephant poaching.
- Securing the Wampís territory, in partnership with Forest Peoples Programme. The project aims to assist the Wampís indigenous community of Peru in securing the legal rights to their ancestral lands and also to gain legal recognition of their rights. Through improved agricultural techniques and cacao production the indigenous community will benefit from an increase in income. The project also provides training and funding to enable the Wampís to monitor land-use change and forest loss.
- Protecting Conkouati-Douli National Park (CDNP), in partnership with Wildlife Conservation Society (WCS). The project works with the local community to ensure long-term protection of CDNP's biodiversity and offers alternative sources of revenue, dissuading the population from participating in illegal degrading activities.
- Kariba REDD+, in partnership with South Pole Group. The project is based in Lake Kariba, northern Zimbabwe and aims to set up a wildlife management area within the proposed Green Zambezi Corridor (GZA) conserving the wildlife, land and self-empowering the local people. This programme provides a variety of workshops, including Moringa leaf production, conservation farming, community gardening, beekeeping and borehole resuscitation and maintenance.

== Funders (past and present) ==
Organisations who have funded the work of Size of Wales:

- The Waterloo Foundation
- Welsh Government (2015–2027)
- Millennium Stadium Charitable Trust
- Fondation Prince Albert II de Monaco
- Hub Cymru Africa
- Ernest Kleinwort
- Ajahma Trust

== See also ==
- Queen's Commonwealth Canopy
