= Tom Middlehurst =

British retired politician

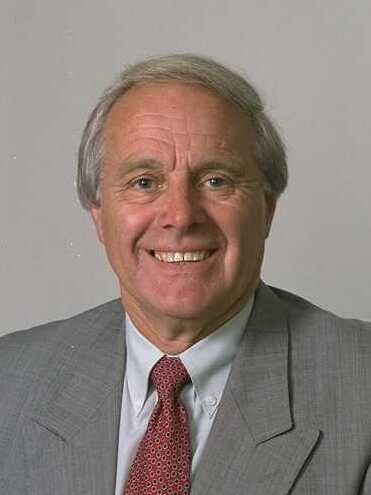
- Official portrait, 1999

Assembly Secretary for Education and Training
- In office 12 May 1999 – 9 October 2000
- First Secretary: Alun Michael; Rhodri Morgan
- Preceded by: Office established
- Succeeded by: Jane Davidson

Assembly Member for Alyn and Deeside
- In office 6 May 1999 – 1 May 2003
- Preceded by: Assembly established
- Succeeded by: Carl Sargeant
- Majority: 6,359 (33.42%)

Leader of Flintshire County Council
- In office 1 April 1996 – 14 May 1999
- Preceded by: Council re-established
- Succeeded by: Alex Aldridge
Other elected offices 1963‍–‍1999
Member of Skelmersdale Urban District Council for Old Skelmersdale
In office 9 May 1963 – 26 March 1968
| Preceded by | Tom Pye |
| Succeeded by | Council abolished |
Member of Alyn and Deeside District Council for Ewloe
In office 7 May 1987 – 31 March 1996 Serving with P. Bernie
| Preceded by | D. Davies |
| Succeeded by | Council abolished |
Member of Clwyd County Council for Sealand
In office 6 May 1993 – 31 March 1996
| Preceded by | Ward established |
| Succeeded by | Council abolished |
Member of Flintshire County Council for Ewloe
In office 1 April 1996 – 14 May 1999 Serving with Alison Halford
| Preceded by | Council re-established |
| Succeeded by | D. Parry |

Personal details
- Born: 25 June 1936 (age 90) Ormskirk, Lancashire, England
- Party: Labour
- Spouse: Patricia Mary (m. 1986)
- Children: 2
- Education: Liverpool Polytechnic

Thomas Middlehurst (born 25 June 1936) is a British retired politician who served as Leader of Flintshire County Council from 1996 to 1999 and Assembly Secretary for Education and Training in the National Assembly for Wales from 1999 to 2000. A member of the Labour Party, he was Assembly Member (AM) for Alyn and Deeside from 1999 until his retirement in 2003.

Middlehurst was born in Ormskirk, Lancashire, England. He was educated at Ormskirk Grammar School, Wigan Technical College and Liverpool Polytechnic, and in his early life lived in Skelmersdale. He was an engineering apprentice from 1952 to 1957 and worked as an engineer at the National Coal Board from 1957 to 1963, before working as an engineer and manager in the private sector until 1971. In 1971, he moved to Wales and became a local government officer for Flintshire County Council and its successor Clwyd County Council, remaining in this job until 1993.

In 1963, Middlehurst was elected as a Labour councillor for Skelmersdale Urban District Council, stepping down in 1968. In Wales, he was elected to Alyn and Deeside District Council in 1986 and Clwyd County Council in 1993 before becoming the first leader of the re-established Flintshire County Council in 1996, where he implemented council tax increases and cut local services to balance the budget. He also fought to prevent the closure of Theatr Clwyd and persuaded Terry Hands to become its director. From 1997 to 1999, he also chaired the Welsh Local Government Association.

In the first election to the National Assembly for Wales in 1999, Middlehurst was elected as AM for Alyn and Deeside. He was appointed to the cabinet of First Secretary Alun Michael as Assembly Secretary for Education and Training. In this role, he implemented free entry for children to galleries and museums, reformed the post-16 system of education and training and trialled a welfare scheme for benefit claimants in Newport, Torfaen and Monmouthshire. He also intervened in the Wales Millennium Centre project to keep government spending under control. He remained in his post under Michael's successor Rhodri Morgan until October 2000, when he resigned in protest of Labour's coalition agreement with the Liberal Democrats. He retired at the 2003 assembly election after becoming disillusioned with the politics of the National Assembly.

== Early life ==
Thomas Middlehurst was born in Ormskirk, Lancashire, England on 25 June 1936. He was educated at Ormskirk Grammar School, Wigan Technical College and Liverpool Polytechnic. He was an engineering apprentice from 1952 to 1957 and worked as an underground engineer at the National Coal Board from 1957 to 1963. He then worked in the private sector as an engineer and manager of work studies until 1971. He was also a fitter and lived in Sherrat Street, Skelmersdale.

== Career in local government ==
Middlehurst is a member of the Labour Party. In the 1960s, he was the secretary of the local branch of the Labour Party in Skelmersdale. In the 1963 local elections, he stood for election to the Old Skelmersdale ward in Skelmersdale Urban District Council to fill the vacancy left by the death of Labour councillor Tom Pye. He was elected for a term of 12 months, the remainder of Pye's term, with 830 votes. He stood for re-election in the 1964 local elections, where he won a second 12-month term, and the 1965 local elections. In 1966, he was elected chair of the council's parks committee. In 1968, Skelmersdale Urban District Council was abolished and replaced by Skelmersdale and Holland Urban District Council; Middlehurst was one of six Labour councillors who did not stand for election to the new council.

In 1971 Middlehurst moved to Wales, settling in Ewloe, Flintshire. He worked as a local government officer for Flintshire County Council and its successor Clwyd County Council until 1993. In the 1987 local elections, he was elected as one of two councillors for Ewloe in Alyn and Deeside District Council alongside Conservative councillor P. Bernie. Middlehurst was re-elected alongside Bernie in the 1991 local elections and also served as the chair of the council's housing committee. He was also elected unopposed as the councillor for Sealand in Clwyd County Council at the 1993 local elections, where he went on to chair the personnel committee.

=== Leader of Flintshire County Council ===
In 1994 the government reorganised local government in Wales, with Clwyd County Council and Alyn and Deeside District Council set to be abolished and replaced by a re-established Flintshire County Council from 1996. At the 1995 local elections, Middlehurst was elected alongside Labour colleague Alison Halford as one of two incoming councillors for Ewloe in Flintshire County Council. On 31 May 1995, the incoming members of the council elected him as Leader of the council. He formally took office as the first leader of the reconstituted council on its re-establishment in 1996, becoming leader of a Labour majority administration.

Middlehurst became Leader of Flintshire County Council on a background of government spending cuts for the county of Flintshire. This meant the council had to raise an extra £3 million in 1996 to provide services at the same standard as provided by its predecessors. To avoid cuts to education and social services, Middlehurst announced a 25% rise in council tax and the creation of a new advisory service for benefits and welfare rights in March. He chose to cut other services to balance the budget. The financial issues also threatened the future of Theatr Clwyd. As council leader, Middlehurst fought to prevent the theatre's closure. In May 1997, he persuaded Terry Hands to become its director and draw up a plan to secure its future, helping to successfully save the theatre.

In December 1996, Middlehurst said he was considering another rise in council tax, this time by 20%, and cutting spending by 8% to maintain services for 1997. However, the government blocked the council from implementing any more council tax increases in that year; as a result the decision was made to cut more services instead. By February 1997, spending on all services including education had been cut by 8%. In December 1997, Middlehurst announced that the government had allowed the council to implement more tax rises, meaning that services would not need to be cut in 1998 and 1999 like in the previous two years. In May 1998, the Audit Commission published its report on the financial performance of local authorities in Wales. Flintshire was judged to have performed above average in most areas while also underperforming in other areas, particularly in the levels of funding for school pupils.

On 4 December 1998, Middlehurst was shortlisted for Labour's prospective candidacy in the constituency of Alyn and Deeside in the first election to the soon-to-be established National Assembly for Wales. His candidacy was confirmed on 18 December. At the time, he refused to be drawn on his future as Leader of Flintshire County Council should he be elected to the National Assembly.

== National Assembly for Wales ==
In 1999, Middlehurst became Assembly Member for Alyn and Deeside (pictured above in red) in the National Assembly for Wales

At the first election to the National Assembly for Wales on 6 May 1999, Middlehurst was elected as Assembly Member (AM) for Alyn and Deeside with 9,772 votes, or 51.35% of the popular vote in the constituency; he had a majority of 6,359 votes. The constituency had a voter turnout of 32%, the lowest in Wales; it had voted against establishing a devolved assembly in the 1997 devolution referendum by a wide margin. In an interview for the Flint and Holywell Chronicle on 14 May, Middlehurst said the low voter turnout showed that his constituents still did not see the new assembly as having any relevance. He said his role was now to prove to his constituents that the National Assembly and the decisions made in it were relevant to their everyday lives, and that to do this he had to work "diligently over a number of years" and explain "to people what we [assembly members] do and why we are doing it". He resigned as Leader of Flintshire County Council on the same day. The council's controlling Labour group elected Alex Aldridge to succeed him.

At the election, Labour on a national level won the most seats in the assembly but fell short of securing an absolute majority. Labour leader Alun Michael mooted a potential coalition with the Liberal Democrats which would give his administration a majority in the assembly. Middlehurst spoke out against a coalition and declared his support for a Labour minority administration; he said coalitions "give too much power to small parties so I don't think we will let the tail wag the dog." In the event, Michael chose to dismiss a coalition and after being confirmed as First Secretary of Wales formed a Labour minority administration. The Labour group in the National Assembly organised itself into three factions, including a faction loyal to Michael, a faction of Welsh devolutionists and autonomists, and a third non-aligned faction which later became loyal to the devolutionist first secretary Rhodri Morgan following Michael's resignation in 2000; Middlehurst aligned himself with the third faction.

=== Assembly Secretary for Education and Training ===
At the first plenary session of the National Assembly on 12 May 1999, First Secretary Alun Michael appointed Middlehurst to his cabinet as Assembly Secretary for Education and Training. This made him the only member of the cabinet to represent a constituency in North Wales. He had a broad portfolio and was responsible for the following policy areas: post-16 education and training, including further and higher education as well as work place and vocational training; employment and the New Deal; arts and culture, including museums and libraries; sports and recreation; and the Welsh language. His appointment was criticised by Welsh language campaigners who pointed out that he could not speak or understand Welsh, although he had started to take lessons to learn the language. Supporters of his appointment noted that Middlehurst was not opposed to the promotion of Welsh like other members of the assembly, and that four in five people in Wales at the time also could not speak the language. As Assembly Secretary for Education and Training, Middlehurst was also a member of and accountable to the Post-16 Education and Training Committee, which scrutinised his portfolio and worked with him to draw up policy.

In addition to Middlehurst, the cabinet also had another education secretary in Rosemary Butler. Butler was appointed Assembly Secretary for Education and Childcare, a post which included responsibility for education to the age of 16. Although intended to have separate responsibilities, it was soon discovered that part of Butler's education portfolio inadvertently extended into post-16 education policy, leaving her and Middlehurst with overlapping responsibilities for policies relating to qualifications and the curriculum. Middlehurst's portfolio also overlapped with Rhodri Morgan's Economic Development portfolio in areas relating to employment and training and Peter Law's Environment and Local Government portfolio in areas relating to built heritage preservation. Middlehurst viewed these overlapping responsibilities as "an opportunity […] to consider major issues affecting Wales in a holistic rather than isolated way". In February 2000, official responsibility for youth services was also transferred from Butler's portfolio to Middlehurst's.

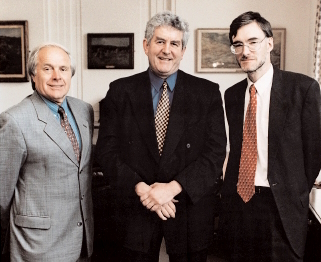
Middlehurst with First Secretary Rhodri Morgan (centre) and chief executive of the National Council for Education and Training Steve Martin (right) in August 2000

Middlehurst and Butler took office at a time of hostility in Wales toward the education policies introduced in England, and they avoided implementing any of the same policies which were being introduced there. Middlehurst and the Post-16 Education and Training Committee drew up reforms to reorganise the system of post-16 education and training in Wales. The reforms included abolishing training and enterprise councils and the Further Education Funding Council and replacing them with a new National Council for Education and Training which would administer and fund education. Other reforms included transferring responsibility for local provision from local education authorities to new community consortiums, and encouraging colleges and schools to cooperate more. Middlehurst said these reforms revolved around reducing competition between schools and colleges. The reforms were also presented as a way to improve standards in the system and make it more accessible. The reforms were controversial with teaching unions; there were fears that there would be cuts in sixth form funding to increase funding for further education, and leading trade unionists claimed that the new community consortiums would be more unreliant and costly. The unions also argued that local education authorities should continue to hold an important role in funding sixth forms. The reforms were endorsed by the National Assembly in February 2000 and made law in July 2000.

In November 1999, Middlehurst launched a trial programme for welfare benefits called ONE in Newport, Torfaen and Monmouthshire with Labour MP David Hanson. The programme entitled benefit claimants in these areas to personalised welfare support and advice. In the same month, he also announced a £58 million increase in funding for post-16 education and a £52 million increase in funding for the arts, culture and sport for 2000 and 2001. These increases in spending would pay for his policy of introducing free entry for children to museums and galleries operated by the National Museum of Wales, a change which came into effect from April 2000. The spending increases would also pay for new apprenticeships and contribute to new financial support for children from poorer backgrounds.

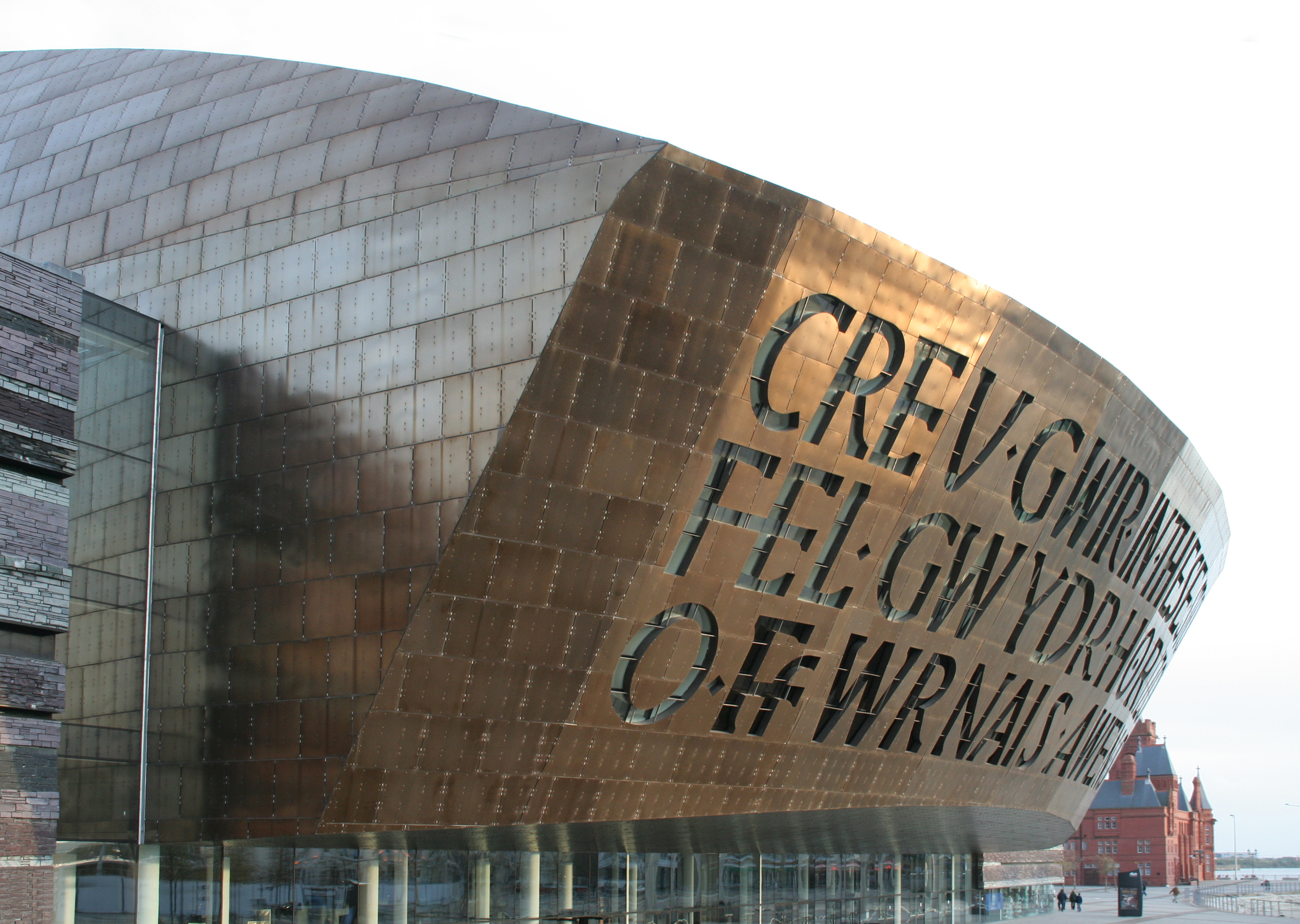
The Wales Millennium Centre, pictured above in 2008

In September 1999, reports that the completion of the Wales Millennium Centre would be delayed by nine months to 2002 led to calls for Middlehurst to clarify the timetable for its opening. In October, Middlehurst confirmed that the centre would not be opened until 2002 because of an unexpected delay in financial agreements and planning permissions which were required before the project could continue as planned. A year later, the expected costs of the project were projected to increase from the original budget of £70.2 million to an estimated £85 million. To keep government spending under control, Middlehurst intervened and enforced a £75 million cap on spending for the project. He also requested a review of the existing plans for the project. Shortly after, the owner of the land on which the project was to be built put it up for sale, making the project's future uncertain. Middlehurst was consequently blamed in the press for the issues surrounding the project until his resignation in October 2000, even though Cardiff Council had made an offer to purchase the land to save the project in September.

=== Resignation from the cabinet and retirement ===
In October 1999, the opposition parties in the National Assembly passed a censure motion against Christine Gwyther, the assembly secretary for agriculture and rural development, after she attempted to introduce a £750,000 calf processing support scheme which was found to be illegal under EU regulations. With the passage of the motion, the opposition parties expected Gwyther to resign. Gwyther refused to do so, and she secured the support of First Secretary Alun Michael and the cabinet to remain in her post. Over the next few months, the opposition parties worked together to oust Michael from the premiership over his failure to secure EU Objective One funding for South West Wales and the South Wales Valleys. In February 2000, the opposition leaders jointly tabled a motion of no confidence in his premiership; the motion was passed by 31 votes to 27 votes because of Labour's minority status in the assembly and Michael resigned as first secretary. His economic development secretary Rhodri Morgan was elected by the assembly to succeed him.

On the formation of Morgan's new administration in February 2000, Middlehurst remained in the cabinet as Assembly Secretary for Education and Training. Morgan decided against making any instant changes to the cabinet following Michael's resignation but did mention the possibility of changes later in the year, some of which he suggested could be the result of potential future deals with other parties. By July, he had sacked Christine Gwyther. This prompted speculation over the potential dismissals of Middlehurst and Rosemary Butler later in the year, as it was possible that Morgan would formally merge their education portfolios in the cabinet. Over the next few months, Morgan negotiated a coalition agreement with the Liberal Democrat leader Mike German. This would give his administration a working majority in the assembly. The deal was announced on 5 October and entitled the Liberal Democrats to two cabinet seats and several policy concessions including significant changes to education. Middlehurst later said he was concerned with these concessions.

I have never envisaged an outcome where Liberals would sit in the Cabinet. That to me is too high a price to pay. Apart from this I have no regard for the Liberal Democrats and do not trust them as long-term allies. I cannot forget how they conspired with the Tories and the Nationalists to censure Christine Gwyther on wholly spurious grounds and then committed the ultimate act of treachery in aiding and abetting the downfall of Alun Michael.

— Excerpt from Middlehurst's resignation letter to Rhodri Morgan in October 2000.

Middlehurst resigned from the cabinet in protest of the coalition agreement on 9 October. He said he did "not accept the need for the Labour administration to work with the fourth largest party in the assembly [the Liberal Democrats]". He explained that he found the coalition unacceptable, as he did not agree with "significant issues" in its new policy programme and disagreed with the idea of the Liberal Democrats having two cabinet seats; he said he had "never envisaged" them serving in the cabinet and said it was "too high a price to pay" for a majority. He also said he was unable to trust them as political allies after they had worked with the other opposition parties to censure Christine Gwyther and force Alun Michael's resignation, the latter of which he described as the "ultimate act of treachery". Middlehurst's resignation was generally perceived as a move made to avoid his widely anticipated dismissal from the cabinet, as the coalition agreement also included the merger of Middlehurst's education portfolio with Butler's. Butler was indeed sacked not long after, with Jane Davidson appointed to manage a now combined education portfolio as Minister for Education and Lifelong Learning.

In December 2001, Middlehurst announced that he would retire at the next assembly election in 2003. He said he had grown disillusioned with the politics of the assembly since his resignation from the cabinet, stating: "I don't like the politics of this place". He criticised the opposition parties in the assembly for forcing Alun Michael's resignation and said they had harmed the assembly's reputation with the Welsh public, calling their behaviour in the assembly "an absolute disgrace". He also reaffirmed his disapproval of Labour's coalition with the Liberal Democrats, stating that it had given the latter "influence and power disproportionate to their number". He said this was the result of the assembly's "failed" proportionally representative electoral system, which he claimed to have opposed, and added that his experience in the assembly had justified his support for the first-past-the-post electoral system. Other stated reasons for his retirement included the "demanding" journey from his constituency to the location of the assembly in Cardiff and personal issues relating to his family. For the remainder of his term, Middlehurst said he would continue to support Rhodri Morgan as first secretary and remain "committed to devolution".

As intended, Middlehurst retired from the National Assembly at the 2003 assembly election. He was succeeded as AM for Alyn and Deeside by Carl Sargeant of the Labour Party. He has provided political commentary since his retirement. After Labour fell short of a majority in the 2007 assembly election, Middlehurst opined that it was likely that Labour would seek another coalition agreement with the Liberal Democrats. Less likely, in his opinion, was an informal deal with Plaid Cymru. Labour went on to form a coalition government with Plaid Cymru which lasted until 2011. In a letter to WalesOnline following the 2009 Welsh Labour leadership election, Middlehurst voiced his opposition to a proposed minister for North Wales. He advised the new party leader Carwyn Jones against acting on this proposal, as he believed introducing such a role would be a "token gesture that could prove extremely divisive" and "exacerbate the perceived divide" between the North and the perceivingly South-dominated National Assembly. In 2011, he expressed concern over the Welsh Government's policy to appoint unelected commissioners to intervene in troubled local authorities and administer them, stating that these commissioners had no democratic legitimacy.

== Personal life ==
Middlehurst married Patricia Mary on 11 April 1986. He has two children from a previous marriage. He is a supporter of Everton Football Club and enjoys rugby league, theatre and crown green bowling. He has served as the chairman of the Welsh Crown Green Bowling Association following his retirement from politics.

National Assembly for Wales
| Preceded by (new post) | Assembly Member for Alyn and Deeside; 1999 – 2003 | Succeeded by Carl Sargeant |
Political offices
| Preceded by (new post) | Assembly Secretary for Education and Training; 1999–2000 | Succeeded by Jane Davidson |
