= Carl Sargeant =

Welsh politician

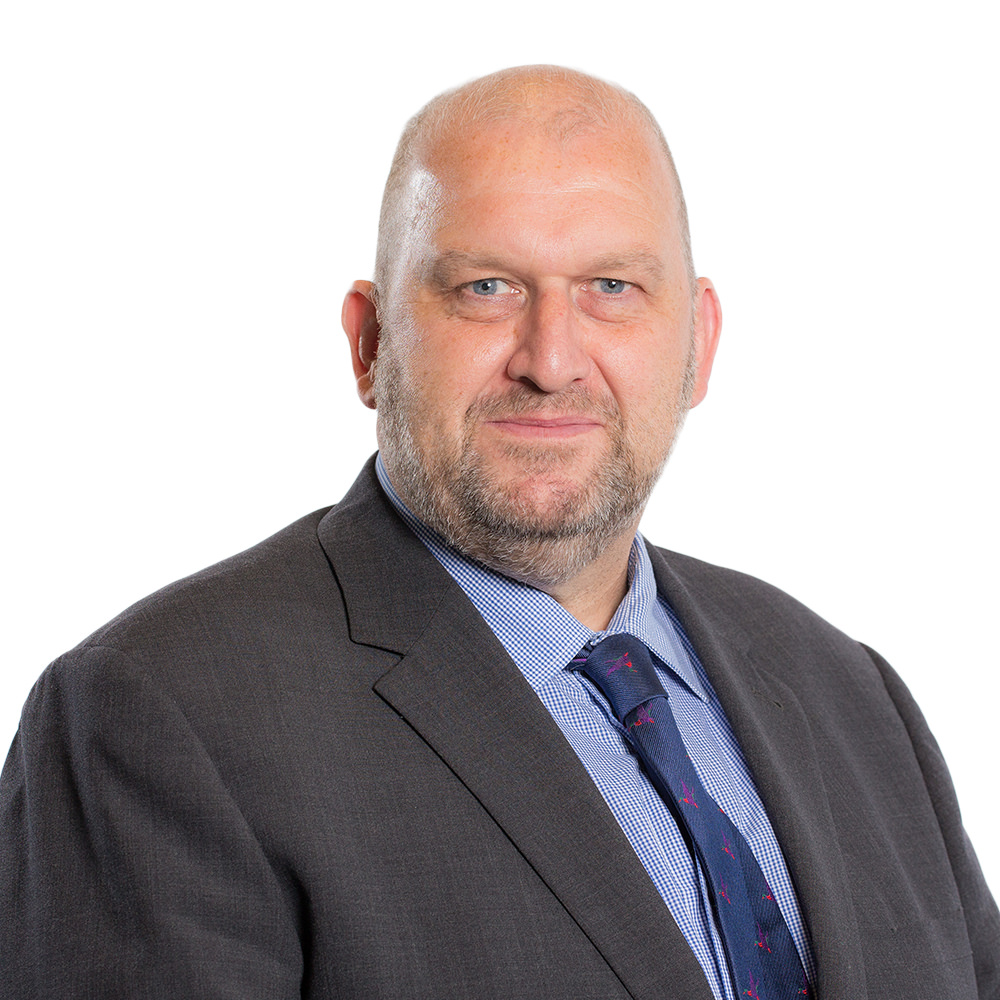
- Sargeant in 2016

Cabinet Secretary for Communities and Children
- In office 19 May 2016 – 3 November 2017
- First Minister: Carwyn Jones
- Preceded by: Jeffrey Cuthbert
- Succeeded by: Alun Davies

Member of the Welsh Assembly for Alyn and Deeside
- In office 1 May 2003 – 7 November 2017
- Preceded by: Tom Middlehurst
- Succeeded by: Jack Sargeant

Personal details
- Born: 27 July 1968 St Asaph, Flintshire, Wales
- Died: 7 November 2017 (aged 49) Connah's Quay, Flintshire, Wales
- Party: Welsh Labour (suspended from 3 November 2017)
- Spouse: Bernie Sargeant
- Children: 2, including Jack Sargeant

Carl Sargeant (27 July 1968 – 7 November 2017) was a Welsh politician who was the Cabinet secretaries and ministers Secretary for Communities and Children in the Welsh Government. He represented the constituency of Alyn and Deeside in the National Assembly for Wales from 2003.

Sargeant was removed from his Cabinet position and suspended from Welsh Labour on 3 November 2017 following allegations about his behaviour. He died four days later. On 11 July 2019, an inquest ruled his death a suicide.

== Background ==
Sargeant was born in St Asaph, Flintshire, to Sylvia (née Hughes) and Malcolm Sargeant. Before becoming an Assembly Member, Sargeant worked as a process operator at the Warwick International Limited chemical manufacturing plant in Mostyn. He was also a quality and environmental auditor and a member of the site's Emergency Response Team.

He trained as an industrial firefighter, and became a school governor of Deeside College and Ysgol Bryn Deva primary school. He was married, with a son and daughter.

== Political career ==
His political career began as an elected member of Connah's Quay town council. His political views developed following the ending of steel production at Shotton in 1980, which contributed to the area's high local unemployment rates. He became an active campaigner for social justice and against domestic violence, identifying as a feminist.

Sargeant was first elected as the AM for Alyn and Deeside in the National Assembly for Wales election of 2003, after Tom Middlehurst stood down.

He was appointed Chief Whip of the Labour Group and a Deputy Welsh Minister for Assembly Business in the Third Assembly of the Welsh Assembly Government (31 May 2007). He remained Labour Chief Whip when the One Wales coalition government of Labour and Plaid Cymru was announced on 19 July.

In December 2009, he was made Minister for Social Justice and Local Government in the cabinet of the First Minister of Wales, Carwyn Jones. Speaking to the Flintshire Chronicle, Sargeant spoke of his pride in being the first person from North Wales to hold the post.

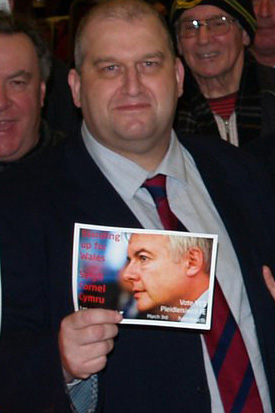
Sargeant campaigned for a Yes vote in the 2011 Welsh referendum.

In June 2011, he dismissed the three commissioners of the Local Government Boundary Commission for Wales, stating that the body "has lost the confidence of its stakeholders". The two others, also members of the Boundary Commission for Wales, resigned their posts there, leading to the start of the Sixth Periodic Review of Westminster constituencies being delayed in Wales.

Following the 2016 National Assembly election, he was appointed as Cabinet Secretary for Communities and Children. He led the Welsh Government's response to the Grenfell Tower disaster in 2017.

Amidst the 2017 Westminster sexual scandals he was suspended from the Labour Party and removed from his position on 3 November 2017, following unspecified allegations about his personal conduct.

== Death ==
Sargeant was found dead at his home in Connah's Quay on 7 November 2017. He was 49. North Wales Police said that they were not treating his death as suspicious. It was reported that Sargeant had taken his own life. At the opening of the inquest on 13 November, the coroner was told that his death was likely to have been due to hanging. The coroner also commented that the death was "an apparent act of self harm". The coroner recorded a conclusion of suicide on 11 July 2019.

Labour leader Jeremy Corbyn described his death as "terrible and deeply shocking news". First Minister Carwyn Jones said, "He made a big contribution to Welsh public life and fought tirelessly for those he represented both as a minister and as a local Assembly Member". The afternoon session in the Welsh Assembly was suspended after the news of his death.

=== Implications ===
Following Sargeant's death, some politicians criticised the process that had led to his dismissal and suspension. Assembly Member Jenny Rathbone said that Sargeant had not been told details of the allegations that had been made against him, and other Labour members suggested that Wales' First Minister Carwyn Jones needed to answer questions about how the situation had been handled. Sargeant's family released to the media copies of correspondence between his solicitor and Welsh Labour, in which Sargeant denied any inappropriate behaviour. The solicitor referred to "the anxiety and distress being caused to our client" (that is, Sargeant), and suggested that any delay in addressing the allegations would be "both prejudicial to the preparation of our client's case but also to his physical and mental wellbeing."

On 9 November 2017, Alun Michael, Police and Crime Commissioner for South Wales and former First Secretary, asked Carwyn Jones, then First Minister of Wales, to set out the allegations made against Carl Sargeant. Former minister Leighton Andrews said that in earlier years Sargeant had been the target of bullying and disinformation in the Assembly which had placed "a strain on his and others' mental health," and that this was known to Jones. UK Independence Party Welsh Assembly member Neil Hamilton called for Jones to resign over the matter, saying that the suspension of Sargeant was both "heartless and in breach of the most fundamental principle of natural justice – giving the accused the right to defend himself."

Sargeant's family called for a public inquiry into the way he had been treated. In a statement on 9 November, First Minister Jones said that, once he had received allegations regarding inappropriate touching or groping by Sargeant, he had had no alternative but to dismiss him. The following day, Jones announced that an independent inquiry into his actions would take place.

Sargeant's death triggered the 2018 Alyn and Deeside by-election for his seat which was held on 6 February 2018. Sargeant's son Jack was selected as the Labour candidate, and was elected to the seat.

On 21 April 2018, Carwyn Jones said at the Welsh Labour conference in Llandudno that he would stand down as First Minister by the end of the year, saying that he had been through the "darkest of times" since Sargeant's death.

On 21 April 2020, the independent investigation was called off. The investigation stalled after the family of Sargeant, unhappy at the format, began legal action. A High Court judge found it was unlawful that Jones had made decisions on the probe.

Senedd
Preceded by Tom Middlehurst	Assembly Member for Alyn and Deeside; 2003–2017	Succeeded by Jack Sargeant
Political offices
New post	Deputy Minister for Assembly Business and Chief Whip; 31 May 2007 to 19 July 2007	post abolished
Preceded by Carl Sargeant	Chief Whip; 2007–2009	Succeeded by Janice Gregory
Preceded by Brian Gibbons	Minister for Social Justice and Local Government; 2009–2011	post-reorganised
New post	Minister for Local Government and Communities; 2011–2013	post-reorganised
New post	Minister for Natural Resources; 2013–2016	post-reorganised
Preceded by Lesley Griffiths	Cabinet Secretary for Communities and Children; 2016–2017	post-reorganised
