= Christine Humphreys =

Welsh politician (born 1947)

The Right Honourable The Baroness Humphreys
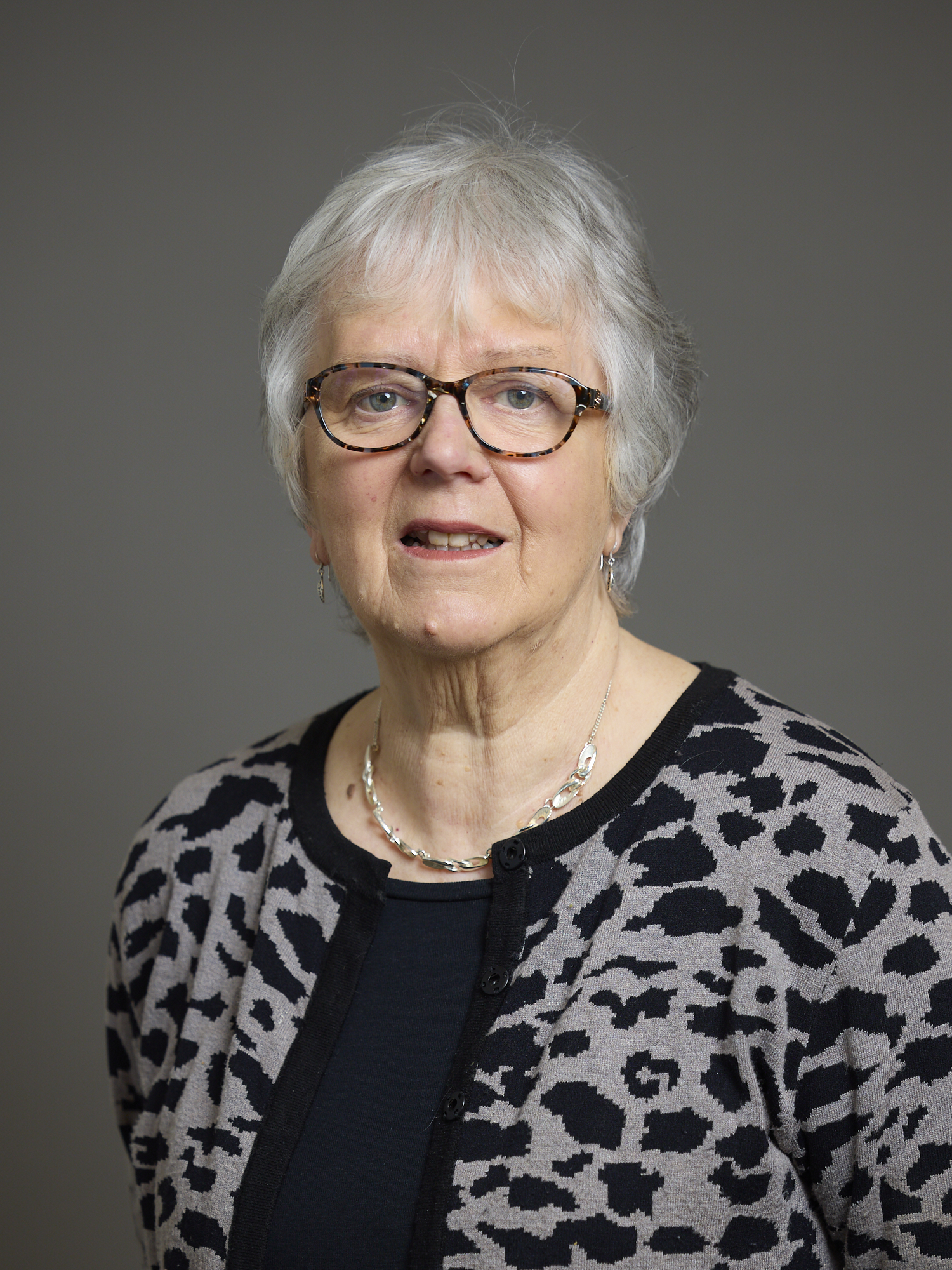
- Official portrait, 2025

Liberal Democrat Spokesperson for Wales
- In office 20 June 2017 – 21 August 2019
- Leader: Vince Cable; Jo Swinson
- Preceded by: Mark Williams
- Succeeded by: Jane Dodds

Member of the House of Lords
- Lord Temporal
- Life peerage 18 September 2013

Member of the Welsh Assembly for North Wales
- In office 6 May 1999 – 22 March 2001
- Preceded by: New Assembly
- Succeeded by: Eleanor Burnham

Personal details
- Born: 26 May 1947 (Age 78)
- Party: Liberal Democrats

Christine Mary Humphreys, Baroness Humphreys, is a Welsh Liberal Democrats peer and leader of the party's group in the House of Lords.

Humphreys is also a former President of the Welsh Liberal Democrats and was a Member of the Welsh Assembly for the North Wales regional constituency from 1999 to 2001. She has also been the Liberal Democrat spokesperson for Wales since 2015.

Before winning election to the National Assembly for Wales in 1999 she was a teacher and Head of Vocational Education in a Welsh Medium School in her home county of Conwy.

== Political career ==
At the inaugural Assembly Election in 1999 she won a North Wales seat. She resigned on 22 March 2001 for health reasons and was succeeded by fellow Liberal Democrat Eleanor Burnham as Assembly Member for North Wales.

In November 2007 she was elected President of the party, defeating Bob Barton and John Last. She went on to serve two terms as party president, including one term as honorary president of the Welsh Young Liberals.

In August 2013 she was appointed a working peer, but she has said that she favours Lords Reform. She was created a life peer on 18 September 2013 taking the title Baroness Humphreys. of Llanrwst in the County of Conwy, and made a point of taking the oath in her native Welsh instead of the traditional English. Her maiden speech in the Lords focused on the significance of Welsh-language broadcasting.

Senedd
New office	Assembly Member for North Wales; 1999–2001	Succeeded by Eleanor Burnham
Political offices
Preceded by Rob Humphreys	President of the Welsh Liberal Democrats; 2007–2013	Succeeded by John Last
