= Karen Sinclair =

British politician (born 1952)

Member of the Welsh Assembly for Clwyd South
- In office 6 May 1999 – 5 May 2011
- Preceded by: New Assembly
- Succeeded by: Ken Skates

Personal details
- Born: 20 November 1952 (age 73) Wrexham, Wales
- Party: Labour
- Education: Grove Park Girls School

Karen Sinclair (born 20 November 1952) is a Welsh Labour politician, who represented the constituency of Clwyd South from when the National Assembly for Wales was established in 1999, until she stood down, in 2011. Born and brought up in Wrexham, north Wales, Sinclair has lived in Llangollen for over twenty years.

== Education and professional career ==
Sinclair was educated at Grove Park Girls School, Wrexham. After working in the Youth service for fourteen years, she became a Care Manager with Wrexham Social Services for clients with learning disabilities. She is also a trained CAB adviser. Sinclair has been a school governor at Ysgol Dinas Brân and chair of the Youth Club Committee.

== Political career ==
=== Local Government ===
Sinclair was a member of the former Glyndwr District council for seven years, preceding the local Government reorganisation and served on Denbighshire County Council. She chairs the URBAN II West Wrexham regeneration project monitoring committee and is a member of UNISON.

=== National Assembly for Wales ===
Sinclair contested the Clwyd South constituency in the First National Assembly for Wales elections, and won the seat with a majority of 3,685 against Plaid Cymru's Hywel Williams. She served as Chief Whip in the first Morgan government. In 2003 this position was re-organised, and Sinclair also began to serve as Minister for Assembly Business. In September 2005, she was reshuffled out of these roles.

She was diagnosed with bone-marrow cancer in May 2008. In October 2009 she announced that she would step down from her Assembly seat at the next election in 2011.

== Offices held ==
Senedd
Preceded by (new post)	Assembly Member for Clwyd South; 1999–2011	Succeeded by Ken Skates
Political offices
Preceded by Andrew Davies	Chief Whip; 2000–2003	Succeeded by (post reorganised)
Preceded by Carwyn Jones	Minister for Assembly Business and Chief Whip; 2003–2005	Succeeded by Jane Hutt
