= Jane Hutt =

Welsh politician (born 1949)

Jane Hutt CBE
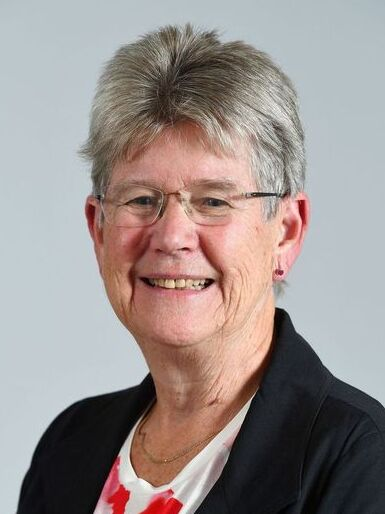
- Official portrait, 2024

Cabinet Secretary for Social Justice (Note: As Minister for Social Justice 2021-2024; and held the Culture portfolio, as Cabinet Secretary for Culture and Social Justice from July to September 2024.)
- In office 17 July 2024 – 12 May 2026
- First Minister: Vaughan Gething; Eluned Morgan
- Preceded by: Lesley Griffiths
- Succeeded by: Heledd Fychan
- In office 13 May 2021 – 20 March 2024
- First Minister: Mark Drakeford
- Preceded by: Office established
- Succeeded by: Lesley Griffiths

Trefnydd of the Senedd
- In office 21 March 2024 – 12 May 2026
- First Minister: Vaughan Gething; Eluned Morgan
- Preceded by: Lesley Griffiths
- Succeeded by: Heledd Fychan
- In office 10 December 2009 – 3 November 2017
- First Minister: Carwyn Jones
- Preceded by: Carwyn Jones
- Succeeded by: Julie James
- In office 10 September 2005 – 19 July 2007
- First Minister: Rhodri Morgan
- Preceded by: Karen Sinclair
- Succeeded by: Carl Sargeant

Welsh Government Chief Whip
- In office 2 May 2023 – 12 May 2026
- First Minister: Mark Drakeford; Vaughan Gething; Eluned Morgan
- Preceded by: Dawn Bowden
- Succeeded by: Heledd Fychan
- In office 13 December 2018 – 13 May 2021
- First Minister: Mark Drakeford
- Preceded by: Julie James
- Succeeded by: Dawn Bowden
- In office 19 May 2016 – 3 November 2017
- First Minister: Carwyn Jones
- Preceded by: Janice Gregory
- Succeeded by: Julie James

Minister for Finance
- In office 10 December 2009 – 19 May 2016
- First Minister: Carwyn Jones
- Preceded by: Andrew Davies
- Succeeded by: Mark Drakeford
- In office 31 May 2007 – 19 July 2007
- First Minister: Rhodri Morgan
- Preceded by: Sue Essex
- Succeeded by: Andrew Davies

Minister for Children, Education, Lifelong Learning and Skills
- In office 19 July 2007 – 10 December 2009
- First Minister: Rhodri Morgan
- Preceded by: Carwyn Jones (Education, Culture and the Welsh Language)
- Succeeded by: Leighton Andrews (Children, Education and Lifelong Learning)

Minister for Equalities and Children
- In office 10 September 2005 – 31 May 2007
- First Minister: Rhodri Morgan
- Preceded by: Office established
- Succeeded by: Office abolished

Minister for Health and Social Services
- In office 12 May 1999 – 10 September 2005
- First Minister: Rhodri Morgan; Alun Michael
- Preceded by: Office established
- Succeeded by: Brian Gibbons

Member of the Senedd for Vale of Glamorgan
- In office 6 May 1999 – 7 April 2026
- Preceded by: Office established
- Majority: 3,270 (7.6%)

Personal details
- Born: 15 December 1949 (age 76) Epsom, England
- Party: Welsh Labour
- Spouse: Michael Trickey
- Children: 2 daughters
- Education: University of Kent; London School of Economics; University of Bristol
- Occupation: Politician, trade unionist

Jane Elizabeth Hutt CBE (born 15 December 1949) is a Welsh Labour politician serving as Welsh Government Chief Whip from 2023 to 2026, Trefnydd of the Senedd from March 2024 to May 2026 and Cabinet Secretary for Social Justice from July 2024 to May 2026. She served as the Member of the Senedd (MS) for the Vale of Glamorgan from 1999 until 2026.

A member of the Parliament since its creation, Hutt holds the record for the longest serving Welsh Government minister and has served in every administration to date. She served continually in government from May 1999 until the November 2017 reshuffle, returning in December 2018. Hutt has held several of the most senior government offices, including Minister for Finance, Minister for Health and Social Services, and Minister for Education.

== Early years ==
Born in Epsom, Surrey, on 15 December 1949, Hutt's Welsh-speaking grandparents are from North Wales, and her father was the pathologist Michael Hutt. Hutt was educated at Surbiton High School and graduated from the University of Kent, Canterbury in 1970 with a BA (Hons), gained a Certificate of Qualification in Social Work at the London School of Economics in 1972 and an M.Sc. at the University of Bristol in 1995.

== Professional career ==
Hutt was one of the founder members of Welsh Women's Aid, a feminist organisation campaigning on behalf of women who are victims of domestic violence. She was appointed as a coordinator of the group in January 1978.

Hutt held non-political appointments as director of the equal opportunities' organisation Chwarae Teg and non-executive director of the Cardiff Community Health Care Trust. Member New Deal Task Force. School Governor. Welsh member on the New Opportunities (UK) Fund.

== Political career ==
Hutt was a councillor on South Glamorgan County Council and a former vice-chair of the Social Services Committee. She unsuccessfully stood for election to the British Parliament in 1983 in Cardiff North.

Hutt was elected to the Senedd in 1999 and has been re-elected at every subsequent election. She served as a government minister for a total of 18 years, 5 months, 23 days (or 6,751 days) from 12 May 1999 to 3 November 2017 making her the then longest serving Labour Minister in UK history. Her record was surpassed in 2018 by Carwyn Jones who served a total of 6,868 days.

Following the Assembly's creation in 1999 she immediately became Health Minister. She remained in post until January 2005 when she was removed from the position, following strong criticism over long hospital waiting lists. An independent report showed that even though waiting list time targets were higher than in England and Scotland, Hutt had still failed to meet them. As a result, she faced criticism from all the major political parties in Wales, with the strongest coming from within her own party. As a result, her position became untenable, as some became worried that the problems could even damage the case for further Welsh devolution.

Advisory video of Hutt in August 2020

She became Minister for Assembly Business and Chief Whip, with additional responsibility for Openness in Government; Communications Strategy; co-ordinating Government policy in relation to children and Equality of Opportunity. In the first Cabinet of the Third Assembly, she was appointed Minister for Budget and Assembly Business (31 May 2007). In the coalition, Cabinet announced on 19 July 2007 she became Minister for Children, Education, Lifelong Learning and Skills.

She left the government during the November 2017 reshuffle and made her first appearance on the back benches on 14 November 2017.

She returned to government as Chief Whip on 13 December 2018 new First Minister Mark Drakeford.

She was the only MS to have served as a Minister in every Welsh Government until 2026, serving in the cabinet of six First Ministers.

Hutt stood down as an MS at the 2026 Senedd election.

== Honours ==
Hutt was appointed Commander of the Order of the British Empire (CBE) in the 2023 Birthday Honours for political and public service.

== Personal life ==
In July 1984, Hutt married Labour councillor Michael Trickey. They have two daughters.

== Notes ==
Senedd
Preceded by (new post)	Member of the Senedd for Vale of Glamorgan; 1999–2026	Succeeded by Seat abolished
Political offices
Preceded by (new post)	Minister for Health and Social Services; 1999–2005	Succeeded by Brian Gibbons
Preceded by Karen Sinclair	Minister for Assembly Business and Chief Whip; 2005–2007	Succeeded by (post re-organised)
Preceded by (new post)	Minister for Budget and Assembly Business; 2007 (31 May to 19 July)	Succeeded by (post re-organised)
Preceded by (new post)	Minister for Children, Education, Lifelong Learning and Skills; 2007–2009	Succeeded by Leighton Andrews
Preceded by (new post)	Minister for Business and Budget; 2009–2011	Succeeded by (post re-organised)
Preceded by (new post)	Minister for Finance; 2011–2016	Succeeded by Mark Drakeford
Preceded by Janice Gregory	Leader of the House and Chief Whip; 2016–2017	Succeeded by Julie James
Preceded by (post split, Julie James as whip)	Chief Whip; 2018–present	Incumbent
