= Cabinet Minister for Education and the Welsh Language =

Welsh Government cabinet minister

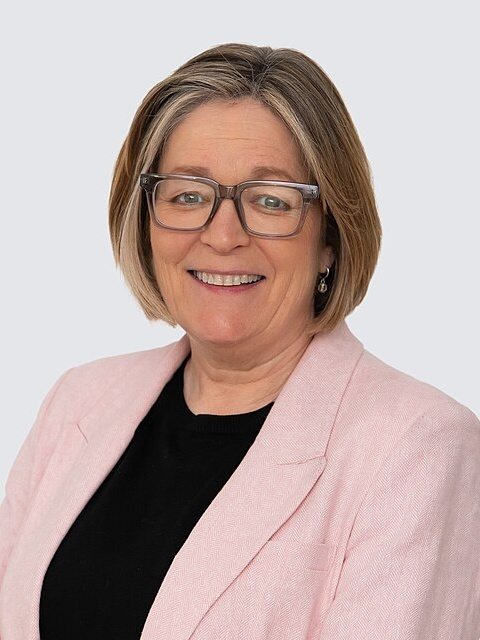
- Incumbent; Anna Brychan since 13 May 2026
- Welsh Government
- Style: Welsh Minister
- Status: Cabinet Minister
- Abbreviation: Education Secretary
- Member of: the Senedd; Cabinet
- Reports to: the Senedd and the First Minister of Wales
- Seat: Cardiff
- Nominator: First Minister of Wales
- Appointer: The Crown
- Term length: Five years; Subject to elections to the Senedd which take place every five years
- Formation: 12 May 1999
- First holder: Rosemary Butler AM
- Salary: £105,701 per annum
- Website: www.gov.wales/lynne-neagle-ms

The Cabinet Minister for Education and the Welsh Language (between 2024 and May 2026 the Cabinet Secretary for Education) is a cabinet minister in the Welsh Government. The current officeholder is Anna Brychan, who has served in the role since May 2026.

The secretary is responsible for education, training and children's services in Wales under powers devolved from the Department for Education of the UK government under Schedule 5 of the Government of Wales Act 2006.

== Ministers ==
| Name | Picture | Party | Entered office | Left office | Government | Notes |
|---|---|---|---|---|---|---|
| Rosemary Butler AM | | Labour | 12 May 1999 | 16 October 2000 | Michael | Secretary for Education Tom Middlehurst served as Secretary for Education and Training (Post-16) for the same period. |
| Rosemary Butler AM | | Labour | 12 May 1999 | 16 October 2000 | Interim Rhodri Morgan | Secretary for Education Tom Middlehurst served as Secretary for Education and Training (Post-16) for the same period. |
| Jane Davidson AM | | Labour | 16 October 2000 | 6 June 2007 | First Rhodri Morgan | Minister for education and lifelong learning. |
| Jane Davidson AM | | Labour | 16 October 2000 | 6 June 2007 | Second Rhodri Morgan | Minister for education and lifelong learning. |
| Carwyn Jones AM | | Labour | 6 June 2007 | 19 July 2007 | Third Rhodri Morgan | Minister for Education, Culture and the Welsh Language. |
| Jane Hutt AM | | Labour | 19 July 2007 | 10 December 2009 | Fourth Rhodri Morgan | Minister for Education, Children, Lifelong Learning & Skills |
| Leighton Andrews AM | | Labour | 10 December 2009 | 25 June 2013 | First Jones | Minister for Children, Education and Lifelong Learning (2009-2011) Minister for Education and Skills (2011-2013) (including Welsh Language) |
| Leighton Andrews AM | | Labour | 10 December 2009 | 25 June 2013 | Second Jones | Minister for Children, Education and Lifelong Learning (2009-2011) Minister for Education and Skills (2011-2013) (including Welsh Language) |
| Huw Lewis AM | | Labour | 26 June 2013 | 19 May 2016 | Second Jones | Minister for Education and Skills |
| Kirsty Williams MS | | Liberal Democrat | 19 May 2016 | 13 May 2021 | Third Jones | Cabinet Secretary for Education and Skills. Titled changed to Minister for Education in December 2018 |
| Kirsty Williams MS | | Liberal Democrat | 19 May 2016 | 13 May 2021 | First Drakeford | Cabinet Secretary for Education and Skills. Titled changed to Minister for Education in December 2018 |
| Jeremy Miles MS | | Labour | 13 May 2021 | 20 March 2024 | Second Drakeford | Minister for Education and Welsh Language |
| Lynne Neagle MS | | Labour | 21 March 2024 | 12 May 2026 | Gething | Cabinet Secretary for Education |
| Lynne Neagle MS | | Labour | 21 March 2024 | 12 May 2026 | Eluned Morgan | Cabinet Secretary for Education |
| Anna Brychan MS | | Plaid Cymru | 13 May 2026 | Incumbent | ap Iorwerth government | Cabinet Minister for Education and the Welsh Language |

== See also ==
- Education in Wales
