= 1999 National Assembly for Wales election =

- 6 May 1999

All 60 seats to the National Assembly for Wales 31 seats needed for a majority
- Opinion polls
- Turnout: 46.3%
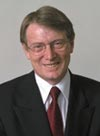

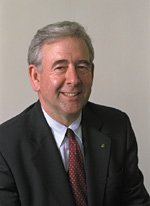

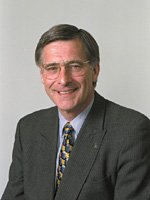

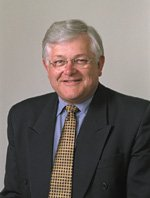
	First party	Second party
Leader	Alun Michael	Dafydd Wigley
Party	Labour	Plaid Cymru
Leader since	20 February 1999	24 September 1991
Leader's seat	Mid and West Wales	Caernarfon
Seats won	28 (Note: Includes 8 AMs sponsored by the Co-operative Party, who are designated Labour and Co-operative.)	17
Constituency vote	384,671	290,572
Percentage	37.6%	28.4%
Regional vote	361,657	312,048
Percentage	35.4%	30.5%
	Third party	Fourth party
Leader	Rod Richards	Michael German (Note: German was campaign leader and prospective group leader. The Welsh Liberal Democrat party leader during this election was Brecon and Radnorshire MP Richard Livsey, who would remain as leader until 2001.)
Party	Conservative	Liberal Democrats
Leader since	10 November 1998	20 November 1998
Leader's seat	North Wales	South Wales East
Seats won	9	6
Constituency vote	162,133	137,857
Percentage	15.8%	13.5%
Regional vote	168,206	128,008
Percentage	16.5%	12.5%
First Secretary after election
Alun Michael
Labour

The inaugural election for the National Assembly for Wales was held on Thursday 6 May 1999 to elect 60 members to the National Assembly for Wales (Welsh: Cynulliad Cenedlaethol Cymru). It was the first devolved general election held in Wales after the successful 1997 Welsh devolution referendum. The election was held alongside the Scottish Parliament election (also the first of its kind) and English local elections.

Although Welsh Labour were the biggest party, they did not gain enough seats to form a majority government and instead entered into coalition with the Liberal Democrats. The election was marked by the historically high level of support for Plaid Cymru, who won their highest share of the vote in any Wales-wide election and their highest number of seats in a Senedd election until both were surpassed in the 2026 Senedd election. The party won considerable support in traditionally safe Labour areas such as the South Wales Valleys, winning Rhondda and Islwyn and narrowly failing to win a number of other seats.

The overall turnout of voters was 46.3%. This would remain the highest ever turnout for a devolved election in Wales until the 2021 Senedd election, which saw 46.6 of voters cast their ballot.

Results map of the 1999 National Assembly election (regional list results)

== Election results ==
- Overall turnout: 46.3%

1999 Welsh Assembly election
Parties	Additional member system										Total seats		
Parties	Constituency					Region					Total seats		
Parties	Votes	%	+/−	Seats	+/−	Votes	%	+/−	Seats	+/−	Total	+/−	%
Labour	384,671	37.6	N/A	27	N/A	361,657	35.4	N/A	1	N/A	28 (Note: Includes 8 AMs sponsored by the Co-operative Party, who are designated Labour and Co-operative.)	N/A	46.7
Plaid Cymru	290,572	28.4	N/A	9	N/A	312,048	30.5	N/A	8	N/A	17	N/A	28.3
Conservative	162,133	15.8	N/A	1	N/A	168,206	16.5	N/A	8	N/A	9	N/A	15.0
Liberal Democrats	137,857	13.5	N/A	3	N/A	128,008	12.5	N/A	3	N/A	6	N/A	10.0
Green	1,002	0.1	N/A	0	N/A	25,858	2.5	N/A	0	N/A	0	N/A	0
Socialist Labour	-	-	-	-	-	10,720	1.0	N/A	0	N/A	0	N/A	0
Natural Law	-	-	-	-	-	3,861	0.4	N/A	0	N/A	0	N/A	0
United Socialist	3,967	0.4	N/A	0	N/A	3,590	0.4	N/A	0	N/A	0	N/A	0
Communist	609	0.1	N/A	0	N/A	1,366	0.1	N/A	0	N/A	0	N/A	0
Independent	30,554	3.0	N/A	0	N/A	-	-	-	-	-	0	N/A	0
Independent Labour	4,134	0.4	N/A	0	N/A	-	-	-	-	-	0	N/A	0
Others	7,736	0.8	N/A	0	N/A	4,673	0.5	N/A	0	N/A	0	N/A	0
Total	1,023,225			40		1,019,987			20		60		

=== Votes summary ===
Popular vote
Labour	35.40%
Plaid Cymru	30.50%
Conservative	16.50%
Liberal Democrats	12.50%
Green	2.50%
Socialist Labour	1.00%
Others	1.60%

Parliament seats
Labour	46.67%
Plaid Cymru	28.33%
Conservative	15.00%
Liberal Democrats	10.00%

=== Constituency and regional summary ===
==== Mid and West Wales ====
1999 National Assembly for Wales election: Mid and West Wales
Constituency	Elected member	Result
Carmarthen East and Dinefwr	Rhodri Glyn Thomas	Plaid Cymru win
Carmarthen West and South Pembrokeshire	Christine Gwyther	Labour win
Ceredigion	Elin Jones	Plaid Cymru win
Llanelli	Helen Mary Jones	Plaid Cymru win
Meirionnydd Nant Conwy	Dafydd Elis-Thomas	Plaid Cymru win
Montgomeryshire	Mick Bates	Liberal Democrats win
Preseli Pembrokeshire	Richard Edwards	Labour win
Brecon and Radnorshire	Kirsty Williams	Liberal Democrats win

1999 National Assembly for Wales election: Mid and West Wales
Party	Elected candidates	Seats	+/−	Votes	%	+/−%
Plaid Cymru	Cynog Dafis	1	N/A	84,554	38.55%	N/A
Labour	Alun Michael	1	N/A	53,842	24.55%	N/A
Conservative	Nick Bourne; Edward Glyn Davies	2	N/A	36,622	16.70%	N/A
Liberal Democrats		0	N/A	31,683	14.44%	N/A
Green		0	N/A	7,718	3.52%	N/A
Socialist Labour		0	N/A	3,019	1.38%	N/A
Independent		0	N/A	1,214	0.55%	N/A
Natural Law		0	N/A	705	0.32%	N/A

==== North Wales ====
1999 National Assembly for Wales election: North Wales
Constituency	Elected member	Result
Alyn and Deeside	Tom Middlehurst	Labour win
Caernarfon	Dafydd Wigley	Plaid Cymru win
Clwyd South	Karen Sinclair	Labour win
Clwyd West	Alun Pugh	Labour win
Conwy	Gareth Jones	Plaid Cymru win
Delyn	Alison Halford	Labour win
Vale of Clwyd	Margaret Ann Jones	Labour win
Wrexham	John Marek	Labour win
Ynys Môn	Ieuan Wyn Jones	Plaid Cymru win

1999 National Assembly for Wales election: North Wales
Party	Elected candidates	Seats	+/−	Votes	%	+/−%
Labour		0	N/A	73,673	34.19%	N/A
Plaid Cymru	Janet Ryder	1	N/A	69,518	32.26%	N/A
Conservative	Rod Richards; Peter Rogers	2	N/A	41,700	19.35%	N/A
Liberal Democrats	Christine Humphreys	1	N/A	22,130	10.27%	N/A
Green		0	N/A	4,667	2.17%	N/A
Rhuddlan Debt Protest Campaign		0	N/A	1,353	0.63%	N/A
Natural Law		0	N/A	917	0.43%	N/A
Socialist Alliance		0	N/A	828	0.38%	N/A
Communist		0	N/A	714	0.33%	N/A

==== South Wales Central ====
1999 National Assembly for Wales election: South Wales Central
Constituency	Elected member	Result
Cardiff South and Penarth	Lorraine Barrett	Labour Co-op win
Cardiff West	Rhodri Morgan	Labour win
Cynon Valley	Christine Chapman	Labour Co-op win
Pontypridd	Jane Davidson	Labour win
Rhondda	Geraint Rhys Davies	Plaid Cymru win
Vale of Glamorgan	Jane Hutt	Labour win
Cardiff Central	Jennifer Elizabeth Randerson	Liberal Democrats win
Cardiff North	Sue Essex	Labour win

1999 National Assembly for Wales election: South Wales Central
Party	Elected candidates	Seats	+/−	Votes	%	+/−%
Labour		0	N/A	79,564	36.92%	N/A
Plaid Cymru	Pauline Jarman; Owen John Thomas	2	N/A	58,080	26.95%	N/A
Conservative	Jonathan Morgan; David Melding	2	N/A	34,944	16.22%	N/A
Liberal Democrats		0	N/A	30,911	14.35%	N/A
Green		0	N/A	5,336	2.48%	N/A
Socialist Labour		0	N/A	2,822	1.31%	N/A
Independent		0	N/A	1,524	0.71%	N/A
Natural Law		0	N/A	665	0.31%	N/A
Communist		0	N/A	652	0.30%	N/A
Socialist Alliance		0	N/A	602	0.28%	N/A
Independent		0	N/A	378	0.18%	N/A

==== South Wales East ====
1999 National Assembly for Wales election: South Wales East
Constituency	Elected member	Result
Islwyn	Brian Hancock	Plaid Cymru win
Merthyr Tydfil and Rhymney	Huw Lewis	Labour Co-op win
Monmouth	David Thomas Charles Davies	Conservative win
Blaenau Gwent	Peter Law	Labour Co-op win
Newport East	John Griffiths	Labour Co-op win
Newport West	Rosemary Butler	Labour win
Torfaen	Lynne Neagle	Labour Co-op win
Caerphilly	Ron Davies	Labour win

1999 National Assembly for Wales election: South Wales East
Party	Elected candidates	Seats	+/−	Votes	%	+/−%
Labour		0	N/A	83,953	41.82%	N/A
Plaid Cymru	Jocelyn Davies; Professor Philip James Stradling Williams	2	N/A	49,139	24.48%	N/A
Conservative	William Graham	1	N/A	33,947	16.91%	N/A
Liberal Democrats	Michael James German	1	N/A	24,757	12.33%	N/A
Socialist Labour		0	N/A	4,879	2.43%	N/A
Green		0	N/A	4,055	2.02%	N/A

==== South Wales West ====
1999 National Assembly for Wales election: South Wales West
Constituency	Elected member	Result
Aberavon	Brian Gibbons	Labour win
Gower	Edwina Hart	Labour win
Neath	Gwenda Thomas	Labour win
Ogmore	Janice Gregory	Labour win
Swansea East	Val Feld	Labour win
Swansea West	Andrew David Davies	Labour win
Bridgend	Carwyn Jones	Labour win

1999 National Assembly for Wales election: South Wales West
Party	Elected candidates	Seats	+/−	Votes	%	+/−%
Labour		0	N/A	70,625	42.25%	N/A
Plaid Cymru	Janet Marion Davies; David Rees Lloyd	2	N/A	50,757	30.37%	N/A
Conservative	Alun Cairns	1	N/A	20,993	12.56%	N/A
Liberal Democrats	Peter Black	1	N/A	18.527	11.09%	N/A
Green		0	N/A	4,082	2.44%	N/A
Socialist Alliance		0	N/A	1,257	0.75%	N/A
Natural Law		0	N/A	676	0.40%	N/A
People's Representative Party		0	N/A	204	0.12%	N/A

== See also ==
- Senedd (formerly National Assembly for Wales)
- Senedd constituencies and electoral regions
