= Carwyn Jones =

First Minister of Wales from 2009 to 2018

The Right Honourable The Lord Jones of Penybont PC
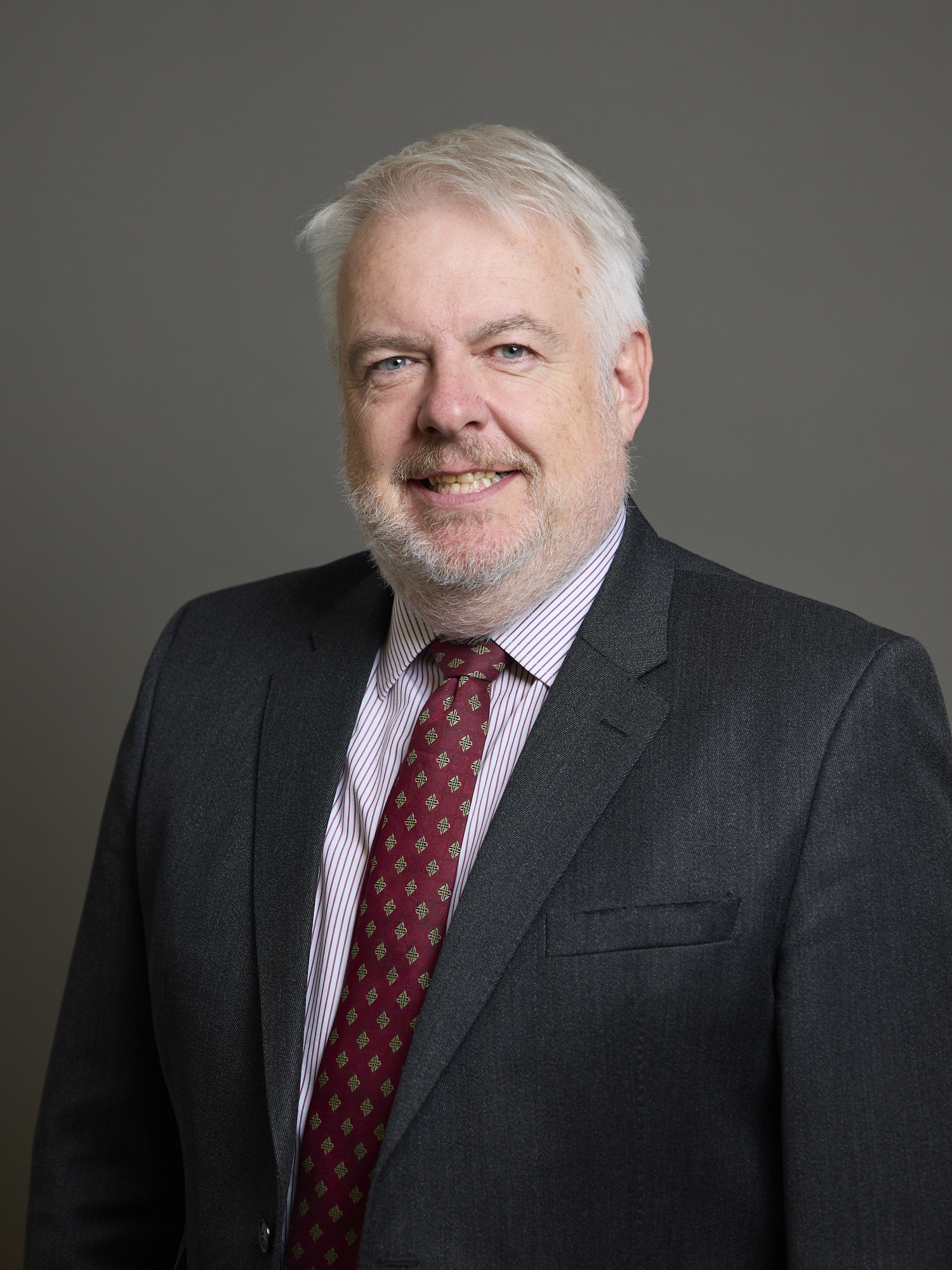
- Official portrait, 2025

First Minister of Wales
- In office 10 December 2009 – 12 December 2018
- Monarch: Elizabeth II
- Deputy: Ieuan Wyn Jones (2009–2011)
- Preceded by: Rhodri Morgan
- Succeeded by: Mark Drakeford

Leader of Welsh Labour
- In office 1 December 2009 – 6 December 2018
- Deputy: Carolyn Harris (2018)
- UK party leader: Gordon Brown; Harriet Harman (acting); Ed Miliband; Harriet Harman (acting); Jeremy Corbyn
- Preceded by: Rhodri Morgan
- Succeeded by: Mark Drakeford

Counsel General for Wales
- In office 19 July 2007 – 9 December 2009
- First Minister: Rhodri Morgan
- Preceded by: Office established
- Succeeded by: John Griffiths
Ministerial offices
Minister for Education, Culture and the Welsh Language
In office 25 May 2007 – 19 July 2007
First Minister	Rhodri Morgan
Preceded by	Jane Davidson
Succeeded by	Jane Hutt
Minister for the Environment, Planning and Countryside
In office 13 May 2003 – 25 May 2007
First Minister	Rhodri Morgan
Preceded by	Delyth Evans
Succeeded by	Jane Davidson
Minister for Assembly Business
In office 18 June 2002 – 13 May 2003
First Minister	Rhodri Morgan
Preceded by	Andrew Davies
Succeeded by	Karen Sinclair
Minister for Agriculture and Rural Affairs
In office 23 July 2000 – 18 June 2002
First Minister	Rhodri Morgan
Preceded by	Christine Gwyther
Succeeded by	Mike German

Member of the Senedd for Bridgend
- In office 6 May 1999 – 29 April 2021
- Preceded by: Constituency established
- Succeeded by: Sarah Murphy

Member of the House of Lords
- Lord Temporal
- Life peerage 23 January 2025

Personal details
- Born: Carwyn Howell Jones; 21 March 1967 (age 59) Swansea, Wales
- Party: Labour
- Spouse: Lisa Jones
- Children: 2
- Education: Aberystwyth University; Inns of Court School of Law
- Profession: Barrister
- Cabinet: First Jones government; Second Jones government; Third Jones government
- Carwyn Jones's voice Jones's 2016 Saint David's Day greeting Recorded 24 February 2016

Carwyn Howell Jones, Baron Jones of Penybont, PC (born 21 March 1967), is a Welsh politician who served as First Minister of Wales and Leader of Welsh Labour from 2009 to 2018. He previously served as Counsel General for Wales from 2007 to 2009. Jones was the member of the Senedd (MS) for Bridgend from 1999 to 2021. He has been a member of the House of Lords since 2025.

Jones served in the Cabinet as Secretary for Agriculture and Rural Development in the Welsh Government from 2000 to 2002, and as Minister of State for the Environment from 2003 to 2007. Following the 2007 election, he was appointed Minister for Education, Culture and the Welsh Language, and thereafter Counsel General for Wales and Leader of the House following the One Wales coalition agreement with Plaid Cymru.

Jones succeeded Rhodri Morgan as first minister and the leader of Welsh Labour on 1 December 2009. The third politician to lead the Welsh Government, Jones was formally nominated as first minister by the National Assembly on 9 December 2009, and was sworn into office the following day.

In April 2018 he announced he would step down as first minister that autumn, and in December 2018 Mark Drakeford (the Finance Secretary in Jones' cabinet) was elected as his replacement.

== Early life ==
Born in Swansea, he was raised in Bridgend in a Welsh-speaking family, and is a fluent speaker of Welsh. He was a pupil at Brynteg Comprehensive School in Bridgend, and then graduated at the University of Wales, Aberystwyth with a LLB degree in 1988, where he joined the Labour Party during the miners' strike of 1984–1985.

== Professional career ==
Carwyn Jones graduated in 1988 from the University College of Wales, Aberystwyth with a Bachelor of Laws degree and went on to the Inns of Court School of Law in London to train as a barrister. He was called to the Bar at Gray's Inn in 1989 and subsequently spent a further year in Cardiff in pupillage followed by ten years in practice at Gower Chambers, Swansea, in family, criminal and personal injury law. He left practice to become a tutor at Cardiff University for two years on the Bar Vocational Course.

Jones unsuccessfully sought the Labour nomination for the UK parliamentary seat of Brecon and Radnorshire in 1997; he later said in a BBC interview that he considered trying to become an MP, but in 1999, "had a chance" to stand for the Bridgend constituency in the first elections for the Welsh Assembly; he has held that seat ever since.

== Political career ==
Jones was a County Borough Councillor for Bridgend for five years, where he eventually chaired the Labour group.

He became a Member of the National Assembly for Wales for Bridgend in 1999 and was appointed Deputy Secretary in the National Assembly for Wales on 23 February 2000. On 23 July 2000, he was appointed to the Cabinet as Secretary for Agriculture and Rural Development in the Welsh Government, before the title was changed to Minister in October 2000. His responsibilities in this role included the environment, countryside issues, town and country planning, sustainable development, agriculture and rural development. In June 2002, his brief was expanded when he was appointed Minister for Open Government in addition to his other duties. During this time, he was responsible for the Welsh response to the 2001 foot-and-mouth disease outbreak.

After the 2007 election, he was appointed Minister for Education, Culture and the Welsh Language, responsible for the Department for Education, Lifelong Learning and Skills and the culture, Welsh language and sport portfolios. After his party entered into coalition with Plaid Cymru, Jones was appointed as Counsel General for Wales and Leader of the House.

Following the announcement by the Welsh Labour Leader and First Minister Rhodri Morgan in September 2009 that he would be resigning both posts in December 2009, Jones entered the subsequent election to become his successor, where his opponents were Edwina Hart and Huw Lewis. On 1 December 2009, Jones was elected the new Leader with over 50% of the vote.

== First Minister of Wales ==
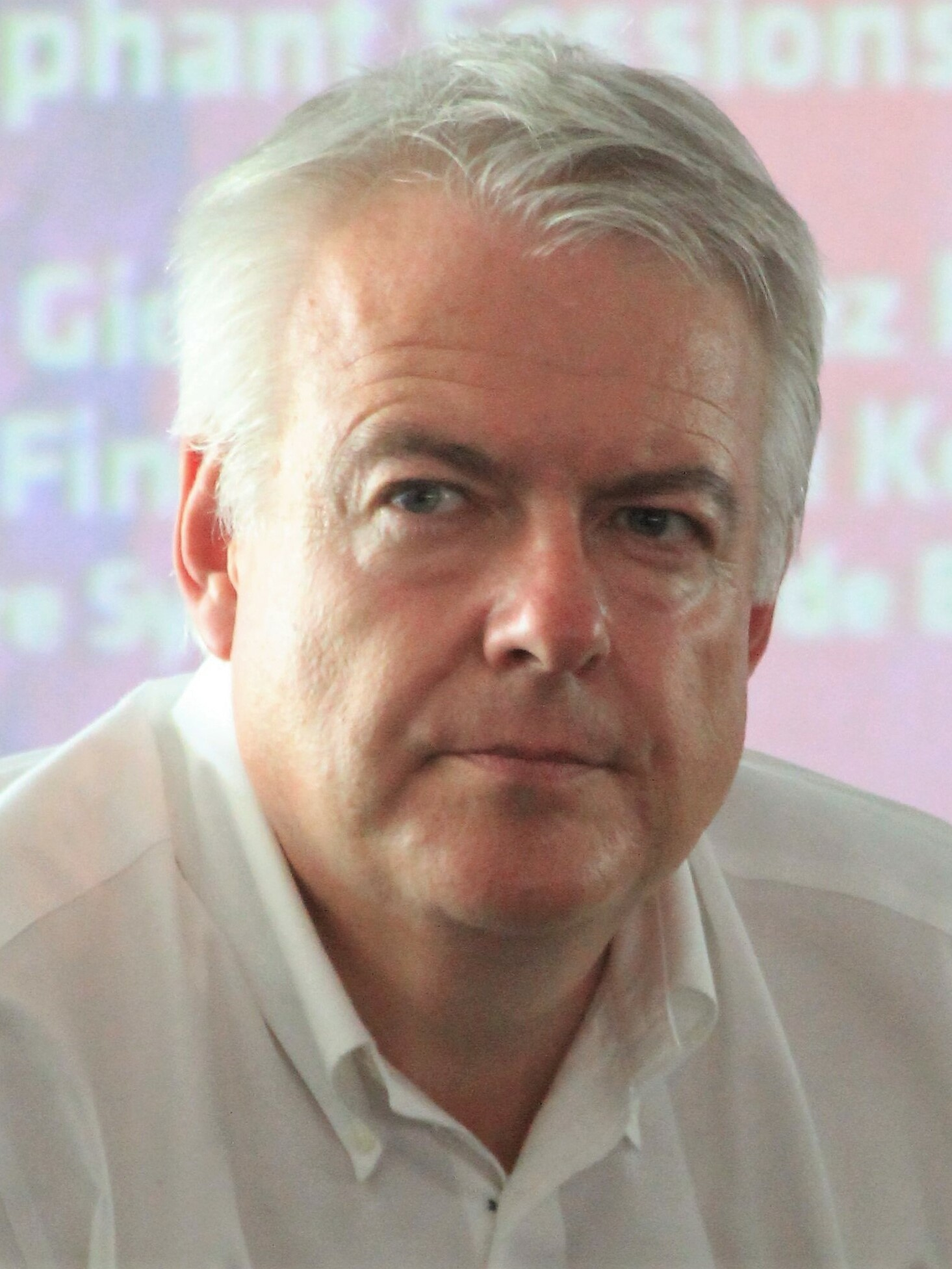
- Premiership of Carwyn Jones; 10 December 2009 – 12 December 2018
- Premier: Carwyn Jones
- Cabinet: 1st Jones government 2nd Jones government 3rd Jones government
- Party: Welsh Labour Party
- Election: 2011, 2016
- Appointed by: Elizabeth II
- Seat: Tŷ Hywel

After winning the leadership election in 2009, Jones was confirmed as the third First Minister of Wales on 9 December 2009. Jones was formally sworn into office as First Minister the following day. After the defeat of the Labour Party in the 2010 United Kingdom general election, and the resignation of Gordon Brown as Prime Minister, Jones was the most senior Labour elected representative and government minister in the United Kingdom. He was appointed a Privy Counsellor on 9 June 2010. Following the 2011 elections to the Welsh Assembly, Labour increased its number of seats to just one under the amount needed for a majority. Jones opted to form a minority government as opposed to continuing the coalition, allowing Labour to govern alone.

=== Relationship with Westminster ===
Following the UK Coalition Government's austerity programme, some members of the UK cabinet sought to criticise Jones. On 8 September 2012, in defending the UK government spending cuts, Deputy Prime Minister Nick Clegg accused Jones of blaming London. Clegg said, "(Jones) is very good at blaming London for everything and terrifically stirring in his speeches about how more needs to be done to help the Welsh economy and yet he does exactly the reverse." Clegg further claimed the Coalition Government was "doing all the heavy lifting, not the Welsh Government".

A spokesman for Jones responded, "We've again witnessed another graceless visit to Wales by Nick Clegg. People would be right to ask themselves – why does he bother coming to Wales, if all he wants to do is hurl insults about issues that he's clearly very poorly briefed on? The fact is, the Welsh Government is utterly focused on making up for the failure of the UK Government to stimulate adequate and sustainable growth to enable Welsh companies to survive and expand during these extremely difficult times. Business leaders right across Wales are telling us they need much more support from the UK Government. So they'll be scratching their heads at the incoherence of the Deputy Prime Minister's message and the paucity of ideas emanating from the UK Government. Wales deserves much better than this."

=== Cardiff Airport ===
On 28 February 2012, Jones told the Welsh Assembly, "We would like to see many routes emerging from Cardiff Airport, but the airport must get its act together... Last week, I went to the airport and the main entrance was shut. People could not go in through the main entrance; they had to go through the side entrance. It is important that the airport puts itself in a position where it is attractive to new airlines, and, unfortunately, that is not the case at present." His criticism led to accusations that he was "talking down" Cardiff Airport whilst aviation industry professionals commented he was out of his depth in this area.

However, Jones returned to this theme on 7 March 2012 saying, "With the condition of the airport at the moment I would not want to bring people in through Cardiff Airport because of the impression it would give of Wales...I have to say the time has come now for the owners of the airport to decide to run the airport properly or sell it." Byron Davies AM, Shadow Minister for Transport, said, "It is a bit rich for the First Minister to publicly attack and run down Cardiff Airport, when he has failed to seize opportunities, which would massively increase the range of routes available from Cardiff, introduce direct routes to North America, opening our economy to trade and business with one of the world's biggest economies." LibDem AM Eluned Parrot said, "The First Minister needs to stop talking our capital city's airport down and instead he should be doing all he can to encourage visitors to Cardiff Airport. His comments are hardly going to encourage tourism and business to Wales."

On 20 March 2012, Jones again attacked Cardiff Airport saying "business people" had complained to him "week after week, for many months about the airport". He asserted he had put their points to the owners of the airport but "they have been met with a shrug of the shoulders. That is just not good enough. I know of situations, and have seen them myself, where people have been locked in the baggage hall and where the front door was not open and people had to go in through a side door — I had to do that the last time I used the airport." On 29 May 2012 it was announced that Jones would personally chair a "Task Force" on Cardiff Airport with the aim of "maximising its economic impact, commercially and for Wales".

On 27 June 2012, the Task Force, comprising tourist chiefs, local government spokesmen and trade unionists, met for the first time. No airlines were invited to attend. A bid to obtain the full minutes of the meeting under the Freedom of Information Act 2000 was refused by the Information Commissioner.

=== Scottish independence referendum ===
In 2013, Jones came out against Scottish independence in the September 2014 referendum.

=== 2016 challenge ===
Following the 2016 National Assembly for Wales election, the Labour Party was two seats short of an overall majority in the Assembly and Jones began negotiations with opposition parties to keep his party in power.

Both Carwyn Jones and Leanne Wood were nominated for the position of First Minister. This vote followed discussions held by Plaid AM Adam Price with both The Welsh Conservatives and UKIP. Adam Price later told The Western Mail's Martin Shipton that the Conservatives were "not exactly enamoured by the prospect of electing Leanne as First Minister with no offer of a place in government. But they agreed to go along with the plan", as did the UKIP group after Neil Hamilton "embraced the idea enthusiastically and didn't need any persuasion."

In a vote on 11 May 2016 both Jones and Wood tied on 29 votes each in the vote to elect a First Minister. Under the Government of Wales Act 2006, if a First Minister is not elected within 28 days of the Assembly elections, those elections would need to be repeated.

Following negotiations with the Plaid Cymru leader, a second vote on 18 May saw an unopposed Jones re-elected as First Minister, enabling him to begin the process of forming a minority government. He was sworn in as First Minister on 19 May, after which he said that he was "delighted to introduce the team who will be taking Wales forward over the next five years". Among his appointments was the former Welsh Liberal Democrat leader Kirsty Williams, who became Wales's Education Secretary.

=== Death of Carl Sargeant and calls for resignation ===
Following the death of the Welsh Assembly Member Carl Sargeant, some had called for Jones to resign as First Minister. Allegations of inappropriate sexual touching had been reported against Sargeant, prompting Jones to remove him from his cabinet position. Later, Sargeant was found dead at his home as a result of suspected suicide. Critics considered it unfair that Sargeant seemingly had not been told details of the allegations and therefore was not put in a position to respond to them adequately.

=== Intention to stand down ===
He returned to the media spotlight in April 2018 when he was cleared by independent investigator James Hamilton of accusations that he had misled the Assembly about bullying problems in the Government which were first alleged in 2014, and which Jones in 2017 told the Assembly had been resolved.

Shortly after the completion of the investigation, on 21 April 2018, Jones announced that he would stand down as First Minister in the autumn. In May 2018, Jones announced he would leave the Welsh Assembly at the next Assembly election in 2021.

Following the election of Mark Drakeford as Leader of Welsh Labour, on 6 December 2018, Jones tendered his resignation as First Minister to the Queen on 12 December 2018, and was succeeded by Drakeford as First Minister the following day. He remained a Member of the Senedd for Bridgend as previously indicated until the 2021 Senedd election.

== Post-leadership career ==
In 2019, he was subject to further press coverage when discussion emerged around the evidence given by Jones during the inquest into the death of Sargeant. The coroner, John Gittins, confirmed that Jones had given a statement as evidence, but that Jones had later withdrawn a particular remark regarding his actions upon hearing of Sargeant's death. Gittins stated that Jones was either mistaken, or more controversially, "perhaps deliberately" misleading about the facts he had originally stated. Jones strenuously denied the latter. Gittins later accepted in his judgment that Jones had acted "perfectly properly".During the inquest Jones had also sought to have evidence admitted pertaining to Sargeant; however, this had been rejected by Gittins. Jones later appealed against the decision but this was rejected in the High Court.

Since stepping down from the leadership, Jones has participated in a number of public discussions on a range of Welsh civic issues. These have included the debating of Welsh independence, including one event at the National Eisteddfod in which he conceded that Wales was "not too poor to be independent". He has, however, continued to argue for greater devolution rather than independence, arguing that independence is "not as easy as some think".

Jones was announced as a senior contributor to the non-political "business to business news platform" Business News Wales. He has launched a podcast series with the website entitled "Carwyn Meets", where he has interviewed the Welsh Rugby Union CEO Roger Lewis, the Economy, Infrastructure and Skills Minister Ken Skates, the Celtic Manor Resort CEO Ian Edwards, and the Transport for Wales' CEO James Price, among others.

It was announced on 15 January 2020 that Jones had been appointed as Professor of Law at Aberystwyth University, and would work in the law and criminology department on a part-time basis.

In November 2020, Jones was elected as the representative of Welsh Labour on the Labour party's national executive committee. Shortly before the election he told LabourList (a news website with a focus on Labour party affairs) that he wished to "make sure that we have an NEC that is a critical friend of the leadership, but is also committing to seeing a Labour government elected again."

In May 2021, Jones was announced as the Chair of Trustees for the Welsh Climate Charity, Size of Wales.

In late 2024, Jones was nominated for a Labour Party life peerage by Prime Minister Keir Starmer. He was created Baron Jones of Penybont, of Penybont in the County of Penybont Ar Ogwr, on 23 January 2025, and was introduced to the House of Lords on 27 January.

== Personal life ==
Jones met his wife Lisa, who is from Belfast, while they both studied at Aberystwyth University. They have two children.

== Honorary degrees ==
Country	Date	School	Degree
Wales	2019	Aberystwyth University	Honorary Fellow

Senedd
New constituency	Member of the Senedd for Bridgend; 1999–2021	Succeeded by Sarah Murphy
Political offices
New post	Deputy Minister for Agriculture and the Rural Economy; 1999	Post re-organised
New post	Minister for Agriculture and Rural Development; 2000–2003	Post re-organised
New post	Minister for Environment and Rural Affairs; 2003–2005	Post re-organised
New post	Minister for Environment, Planning and Countryside; 2005–2007	Succeeded by Jane Davidson
Preceded by Jane Davidson	Minister for Education, Culture and the Welsh Language; 2007	Post re-organised
Preceded by Rhodri Morgan	First Minister of Wales; 2009–2018	Succeeded by Mark Drakeford
Legal offices
New office	Counsel General for Wales; 2007–2009	Succeeded by John Griffiths
Party political offices
Preceded by Rhodri Morgan	Leader of the Welsh Labour Party; 2009–2018	Succeeded by Mark Drakeford
