= List of first ministers of Wales =

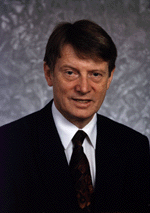
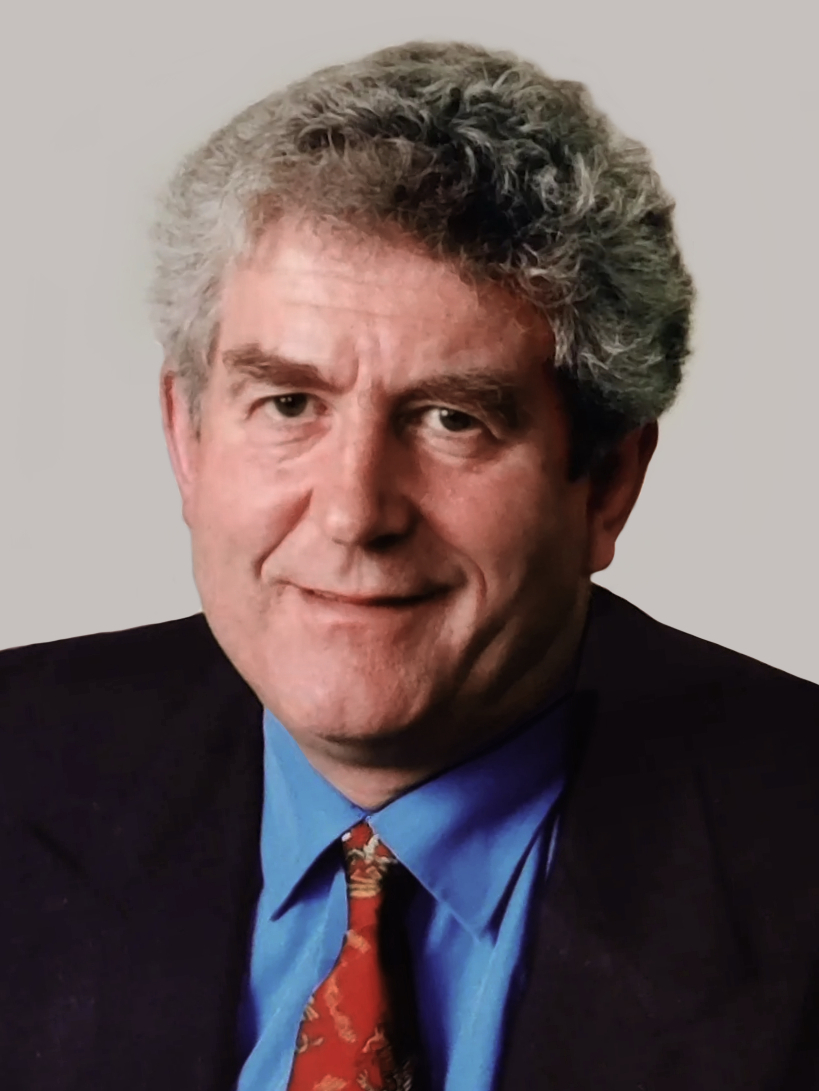
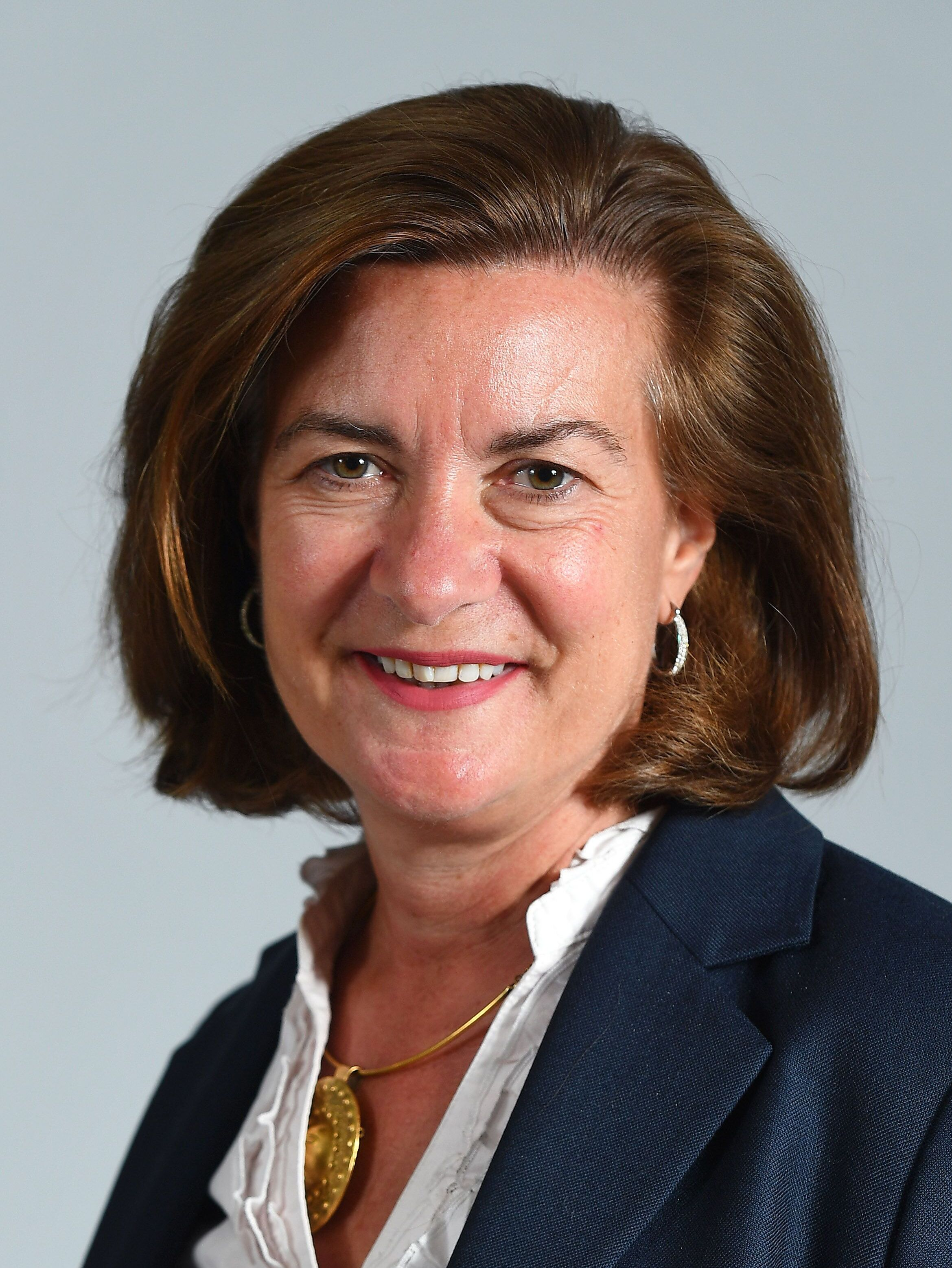
- Top left: Alun Michael was the first-ever first minister (then first secretary) of Wales.
- Top right: Rhodri Morgan was the longest-serving first minister of Wales.
- Bottom left: Eluned Morgan was the first female first minister of Wales.
- Bottom right: Rhun ap Iorwerth is the current first minister of Wales.

This is a list of the first ministers of Wales. The role of "First Secretary of Wales" was introduced in 1999 with the establishment of the National Assembly for Wales (now Senedd) following the 1997 referendum. The title of the role was changed to "First Minister of Wales" in October 2000, a change which was recognised in law following the enactment of the Government of Wales Act 2006. Until 2026, all first ministers to date also served concurrently as leader of Welsh Labour.

After the 2026 Senedd election, Plaid Cymru leader Rhun ap Iorwerth became the first officeholder to come from a party other than Welsh Labour.

== List of First Ministers of Wales ==
No.	Portrait	Name (Birth–Death) Constituency/Title	Term of office			Political party	Elected	Government	Deputy
No.	Portrait	Name (Birth–Death) Constituency/Title	Start of term	End of term	Tenure	Political party	Elected	Government	Deputy
1		Alun Michael (born 1943); AM for Mid and West Wales as First Secretary	12 May 1999	9 February 2000	273 days	Labour Co-op	1999	Michael; Lab (minority)	none
2		Rhodri Morgan (1939–2017); AM for Cardiff West; Office renamed First Minister on 16 October 2000	9 February 2000 (Note: Acting: 9 February 2000 – 15 February 2000)	9 December 2009	9 years, 303 days	Labour	—	Interim Rh. Morgan; Lab (minority)	none
2		Rhodri Morgan (1939–2017); AM for Cardiff West; Office renamed First Minister on 16 October 2000	9 February 2000	9 December 2009	9 years, 303 days	Labour	—	Rh. Morgan I Lab – LD	Mike German (LD); 2000–01 and 2002-03 Jenny Randerson; 2001–02 (acting)
2		Rhodri Morgan (1939–2017); AM for Cardiff West; Office renamed First Minister on 16 October 2000	9 February 2000	9 December 2009	9 years, 303 days	Labour	2003	Rh. Morgan II; Lab (minority)	none
2		Rhodri Morgan (1939–2017); AM for Cardiff West; Office renamed First Minister on 16 October 2000	9 February 2000	9 December 2009	9 years, 303 days	Labour	2007	Rh. Morgan III; Lab (minority)	none
2		Rhodri Morgan (1939–2017); AM for Cardiff West; Office renamed First Minister on 16 October 2000	9 February 2000	9 December 2009	9 years, 303 days	Labour	—	Rh. Morgan IV; Lab – Plaid	Ieuan Wyn Jones (Plaid Cymru)
3		Carwyn Jones later created Baron Jones of Penybont (born 1967); AM for Bridgend	10 December 2009	12 December 2018	9 years, 2 days	Labour	—	Jones I Lab – Plaid	Ieuan Wyn Jones (Plaid Cymru)
3		Carwyn Jones later created Baron Jones of Penybont (born 1967); AM for Bridgend	10 December 2009	12 December 2018	9 years, 2 days	Labour	2011	Jones II; Lab (minority)	none
3		Carwyn Jones later created Baron Jones of Penybont (born 1967); AM for Bridgend	10 December 2009	12 December 2018	9 years, 2 days	Labour	2016	Jones III; Lab – LD - Ind	none
4		Mark Drakeford (born 1954); MS for Cardiff West	13 December 2018	20 March 2024	5 years, 98 days	Labour	—	Drakeford I Lab – LD - Ind	none
4		Mark Drakeford (born 1954); MS for Cardiff West	13 December 2018	20 March 2024	5 years, 98 days	Labour	2021	Drakeford II; Lab (minority)	none
5		Vaughan Gething (born 1974); MS for Cardiff South and Penarth	20 March 2024	5 August 2024	138 days	Labour Co-op	—	Gething; Lab (minority)	none
6		Eluned Morgan, Baroness Morgan of Ely (born 1967); MS for Mid and West Wales	6 August 2024	12 May 2026	1 year, 280 days	Labour	—	E. Morgan; Lab (minority)	Huw Irranca-Davies (Labour)
7		Rhun ap Iorwerth (born 1972); MS for Bangor Conwy Môn	12 May 2026	Incumbent	130 days	Plaid Cymru	2026	ap Iorwerth; Plaid (minority)	Sioned Williams (Plaid Cymru)

=== Timeline ===
This is a graphical lifespan timeline of the first secretaries and first ministers of Wales. They are listed in order of first assuming office.

The following chart lists first secretaries and first ministers by lifespan (living first secretaries and first ministers on the green line), with the years outside of their tenure in beige.

The following chart shows first secretaries and first ministers by their age (living first secretaries and first ministers in green), with the years of their tenure in blue.

== Previous nominations ==
=== 2026 ===
2026 Nomination of First Minister
Date:	12 May 2026
Candidate	Votes
Rhun ap Iorwerth (Plaid Cymru)	44 / 94
Dan Thomas (Reform)	34 / 94
Darren Millar (Conservative)	7 / 94
Abstentions	9 / 94
Source: Senedd

=== August 2024 ===
August 2024 Nomination of First Minister
Date:	6 August 2024
Candidate	Votes
Eluned Morgan (Labour)	28 / 56
Andrew R. T. Davies (Conservative)	15 / 56
Rhun ap Iorwerth (Plaid Cymru)	12 / 56
Abstentions	1 / 56
Source: Senedd

=== March 2024 ===
March 2024 Nomination of First Minister
Date:	20 March 2024
Candidate	Votes
Vaughan Gething (Labour)	27 / 51
Andrew R.T. Davies (Conservative)	13 / 51
Rhun ap Iorwerth (Plaid Cymru)	11 / 51
Source: Senedd

=== 2021 ===
On 12 May 2021, Mark Drakeford was the only person nominated for the position (by Rebecca Evans), and was a subsequently recommended by the presiding officer to be appointed as First Minister.

=== 2018 ===
2018 Nomination of First Minister
Date:	12 December 2018
Candidate	Votes
Mark Drakeford (Labour)	30 / 56
Paul Davies (Conservative)	12 / 56
Adam Price (Plaid Cymru)	9 / 56
Abstentions	5 / 56
Source: Senedd

=== 2016 ===
2016 Nomination of First Minister
Date:	11 May 2016
Candidate	Votes
Carwyn Jones (Labour)	29 / 58
Leanne Wood (Note: Later withdrew on 18 May 2016) (Plaid Cymru)	29 / 58
Abstentions	0 / 56
Source: Senedd

=== 2011 ===
On 11 May 2011, Carwyn Jones was the only person nominated for the position (by Janice Gregory), and was a subsequently recommended by the presiding officer to be appointed as First Minister.

=== 2009 ===
On 9 December 2009, Carwyn Jones was the only person nominated for the position (by Rhodri Morgan), and was a subsequently recommended by the presiding officer to be appointed as First Minister.

=== 2007 ===
On 25 May 2007, Rhodri Morgan was the only person nominated for the position (by Jane Hutt), and was a subsequently recommended by the presiding officer to be appointed as First Minister.

=== 2003 ===
On 7 May 2003, Rhodri Morgan was the only person nominated for the position (by Lynne Neagle), and was a subsequently elected as First Minister.

=== 2000 ===
On Wednesday 9 February 2000, following the resignation of Alun Michael, the Assembly cabinet unanimously elected Rhodri Morgan as acting First Secretary. He was elected unopposed as First Secretary by the whole Assembly (after being proposed by Andrew Davies) the following week on Tuesday 15 February.

=== 1999 ===
On 12 May 1999, Alun Michael was the only person nominated for the position (by Rhodri Morgan and seconded by Ann Jones), and was a subsequently elected as First Secretary.

== Notes ==
- Dates are from various BBC News Online articles from 1999 to 2003.
