= Cabinet Minister for Culture and Sport =

Welsh Government minister

Cabinet Minister for Culture and Sport of Wales

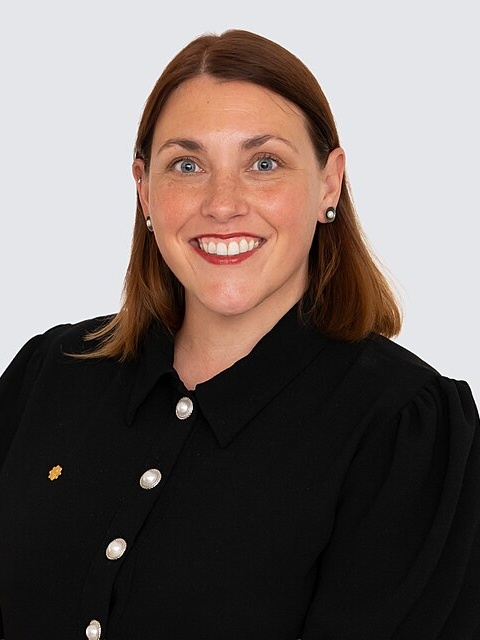
- Incumbent; Heledd Fychan since 13 May 2026
- Welsh Government
- Style: Welsh Minister
- Status: Cabinet Minister
- Abbreviation: Culture Secretary
- Member of: Senedd; Cabinet
- Reports to: the Senedd, the First Minister of Wales
- Seat: Cardiff
- Nominator: First Minister of Wales
- Appointer: The Crown
- Term length: Four years; Subject to elections to the Senedd which take place every four years
- First holder: Ken Skates AM
- Website: gov.wales/dawn-bowden-ms

The Cabinet Minister for Culture and Sport is a member of the cabinet in the Welsh Government. The current officeholder is Heledd Fychan since May 2026. It was previously a non-cabinet role known as the Deputy Minister for Arts, Sport and Tourism (Welsh: Dirprwy Weinidog y Celfyddydau, Chwaraeon a Thwristiaeth), accountable to the cabinet minister for the economy. Established in 2014, the last officeholder was Dawn Bowden from May 2021 to March 2024.

== List ==
Name	Picture	Entered office	Left office	Other offices held	Political party	Government	Notes
Minister for Culture, Sports and Welsh Language
Jenny Randerson		17 October 2000	30 April 2003	Acting Deputy First Minister of Wales (2001–2002)	Liberal Democrat	First Rhodri Morgan government	
Alun Pugh		9 May 2003	3 May 2007		Labour	Second Rhodri Morgan government	
Minister for Culture
Carwyn Jones		25 May 2007	19 July 2007	Minister for Education and the Welsh Language	Labour	Third Rhodri Morgan government	
Minister for Heritage
Rhodri Glyn Thomas		11 July 2007	18 July 2008		Plaid Cymru	Fourth Rhodri Morgan government	
Alun Ffred Jones		28 July 2008	13 May 2011		Plaid Cymru	First Jones government	
Huw Lewis		13 May 2011	26 June 2013	Minister for Housing and Regeneration	Labour	Second Jones government	
Minister for Culture and Sport
John Griffiths		14 March 2013	11 September 2014		Labour	Second Jones government	
Deputy Minister for Culture, Sport and Tourism
Ken Skates		11 September 2014	20 May 2016		Labour	Second Jones government	
Minister for Culture, Sport and Tourism
Dafydd Elis-Thomas		3 November 2017	13 May 2021		Independent	Third Jones government First Drakeford government	
Deputy Minister for Arts and Sport
Dawn Bowden		13 May 2021	20 March 2024	Chief Whip (–May 2023) Gained Tourism portfolio in February 2023.	Labour	Second Drakeford government	
Cabinet Minister for Culture and Sport
Heledd Fychan		13 May 2026	Incumbent	Chief Whip, Trefnydd	Plaid Cymru	ap Iorwerth government	

== Responsibilities ==
The responsibilities of the post were:

- Assist in establishing, growing, and developing businesses, by providing support (including export support) and advice
- Inward investment support
- Policy on international trade
- Information regarding entrepreneurship, enterprise and businesses
- Development Bank of Wales
- Economic Advisory Panel
- Council for Economic Development and Social Partnership Strategy Group
- Promoting Wales as a Business and Investment location
- Cardiff Capital Region City Deal and Swansea Bay City Deal
- Mid Wales Growth Deal and North Wales Growth Deal
- Manage economic development-related Welsh Government-owned property
- Services for business development and business skills
- Careers Policy and sponsoring Careers Choices Dewis Gyrfa (CCDG)
- Policy and delivery of Apprenticeships
- Policy and delivery of Youth and Adult employability
- Learning providers based on work
- Sector skills
- Developing Workforce skills
- Skills and employment-related European programmes
- Regional Skills Partnership
- National Occupational Standards
- A responsible business practices, competitiveness and growth regulatory framework
- Foundational Economy
- The social economy and Social Enterprise
- The co-operative economy
- Science
  - Science policy development, including regular liaison with the Chief Scientific Adviser for Wales and the National Science Academy
- Life Sciences
- Research and Innovation, including knowledge transfer, research and development, and commercialisation, leading to the maximisation of innovation and research incomes, and Research Centres of Excellence
- Infrastructure for digital connectivity, such as the Public Sector Broadband Aggregation, and fast broadband and mobile
- Cross Government Digital and Data Policy & Strategy
- Major events
- Culture, the arts and creativity, including Creative Wales
- Policy on broadcasting
- Sponsoring the Arts Council of Wales and deciding its responsibilities
- Tourism in Wales (both within Wales and to Wales)
- Hospitality
- The historic environment of Wales
- Cadw
- Royal Commission on the Ancient and Historical Monuments of Wales
- Amgueddfa Cymru – Museum Wales
- National Library of Wales
- Developing a National Archive for Wales
- National Botanic Garden of Wales
- Elite sport
- Community sport, active recreation and physical activity, sponsorship of Sports Council for Wales
- The Valleys taskforce and programme
- 2014–2020 European Structural and Investment Funds
- Shared Prosperity Fund / Community Renewal Fund

The post-holder notably announced a registration and licensing scheme for all visitor accommodation in Wales. The post is accountable and deputy to the Minister for the Economy.

== See also ==
- Ministry
