= Jones government =

Jones government may refer to:

- First Jones government, the Welsh Assembly Government led by Carwyn Jones from 2009 to 2011
- Second Jones government, the Welsh Government led by Carwyn Jones from 2011 to 2016
- Third Jones government, the Welsh Government led by Carwyn Jones from 2016 to 2018
