= Drakeford government =

Drakeford government can refer to

- First Drakeford government, the Welsh Government led by Mark Drakeford from 2018 to 2021
- Second Drakeford government, the Welsh Government led by Mark Drakeford from 2021 to present
