= Fourth Rhodri Morgan government =

Welsh coalition government (2007–2009)

- 6th devolved administration of Wales
- 2007-2009
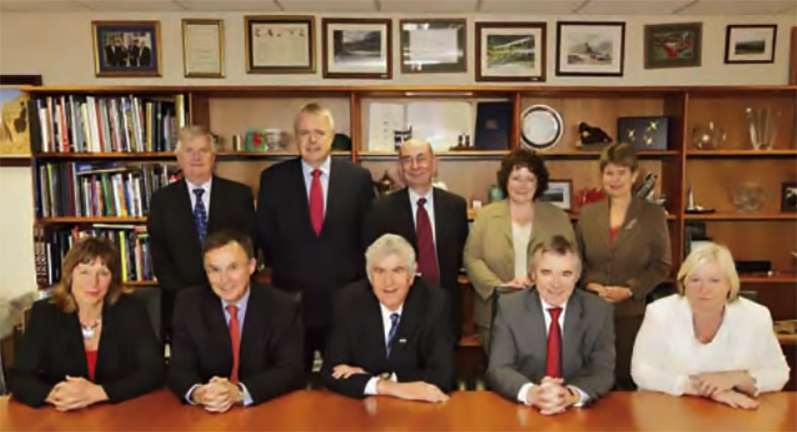
- Morgan's fourth cabinet, c. May 2009
- Date formed: 19 July 2007
- Date dissolved: 10 December 2009

People and organisations
- Monarch: Elizabeth II
- First Minister: Rhodri Morgan
- Deputy First Minister: Ieuan Wyn Jones
- Member parties: Labour; Plaid Cymru
- Status in legislature: Majority (coalition)
- Opposition party: Conservative
- Opposition leader: Nick Bourne

History
- Legislature term: 3rd National Assembly for Wales
- Predecessor: Third Rhodri Morgan government
- Successor: First Jones government

The fourth Rhodri Morgan government (19 July 2007 – 10 December 2009) was a Labour–Plaid Cymru coalition government of Wales led by First Minister for Wales, Rhodri Morgan.

After the collapse of talks for a rainbow coalition between Plaid Cymru, the Conservative Party and the Liberal Democrats, the Labour Party started talks with Plaid Cymru, reaching the "One Wales" agreement. A new cabinet was appointed on 19 July 2007.

== Cabinet ==
Office	Name	Term	Party
First Minister	Rhodri Morgan	2007–2009	Labour
Deputy First Minister Minister for the Economy and Transport	Ieuan Wyn Jones	2007–2009	Plaid Cymru
Minister for Children, Education, Lifelong Learning and Skills	Jane Hutt	2007–2009	Labour
Minister for Environment, Sustainability and Housing	Jane Davidson	2007–2009	Labour
Minister for Finance and Public Service Delivery	Andrew Davies	2007–2009	Labour
Minister for Health and Social Services	Edwina Hart	2007–2009	Labour
Minister for Heritage	Rhodri Glyn Thomas	2007–2008	Plaid Cymru
Minister for Heritage	Alun Ffred Jones	2008–2009	Plaid Cymru
Minister for Rural Affairs	Elin Jones	2007–2009	Plaid Cymru
Minister for Social Justice and Local Government	Brian Gibbons	2007–2009	Labour
Office holders given special provisions to attend Cabinet
Leader of the House Counsel General for Wales	Carwyn Jones	2007–2009	Labour
Chief Whip	Carl Sargeant	2007–2009	Labour

=== Junior ministers ===
Office	Name	Term	Party
Deputy Minister for Skills	John Griffiths	2007–2009	Labour
Deputy Minister for Regeneration	Leighton Andrews	2007–2009	Labour
Deputy Minister for Housing	Jocelyn Davies	2007–2009	Plaid Cymru
Deputy Minister for Social Services	Gwenda Thomas	2007–2009	Labour

== Retirement of Rhodri Morgan ==
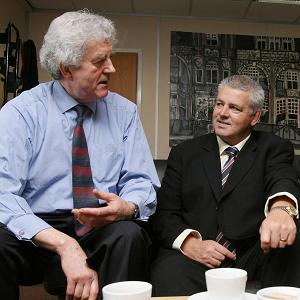
Morgan (left) with the newly appointed Welsh rugby coach, Warren Gatland in 2008.

In July 2005, Morgan announced his intention to lead the Welsh Labour party into the 2007 general election, but retire as leader of Welsh Labour and First Minister sometime in 2009, when he would be 70. On his 70th birthday (29 September) he set the exact date as immediately following the Assembly's budget session on 8 December 2009. Counsel General Carwyn Jones, Health Minister Edwina Hart and Merthyr Tydfil and Rhymney AM Huw Lewis entered a leadership contest to elect a new Labour leader in Wales. On 1 December 2009 the winner was declared as Carwyn Jones, who assumed office as First Minister on 10 December 2009. Morgan remained a backbench AM until April 2011, when the third Assembly was dissolved before the general election on 5 May 2011.

== See also ==
- Members of the 3rd National Assembly for Wales
