= Second Jones government =

Welsh government (2011–2016)

- 8th devolved government of Wales
- 2011–2016
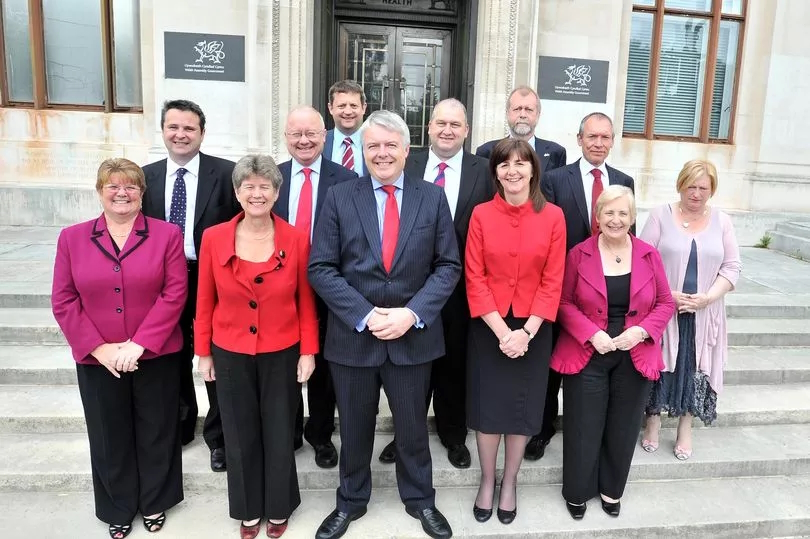
- Jones's second cabinet on 13 May 2011
- Date formed: 11 May 2011
- Date dissolved: 19 May 2016

People and organisations
- Monarch: Elizabeth II
- First Minister: Carwyn Jones
- First Minister's history: 2009–2018
- Member party: Labour
- Status in legislature: Minority
- Opposition party: Conservative
- Opposition leader: Paul Davies Interim; Andrew RT Davies

History
- Election: 2011 National Assembly for Wales election
- Outgoing election: 2016 National Assembly for Wales election
- Legislature term: 4th National Assembly for Wales
- Predecessor: First Jones government
- Successor: Third Jones government

The second Jones government (11 May 2011 – 19 May 2016) was a Labour minority government.

Having won the largest number of seats in the 2011 general election (30 out of 60) the Labour sought to form a minority government, having previously governed in coalition with Plaid Cymru. Carwyn Jones was re-elected First Minister in May 2011 and continued to serve up to and beyond the 2016 election.

During the five years of this government there were two significant reshuffles (March 2013 and September 2014) as well as two departures from the Cabinet, both of which led to widespread changes in personnel and in ministerial titles and responsibilities.

This government was the first since the 2011 referendum on primary law making powers and thus passed the first Welsh Law without the expressed consent of Westminster. The Welsh Government under Carwyn Jones also purchased and nationalised Cardiff Airport during this period.

== Cabinet ==
Name	Party	Image	Office(s)	Dates(s) (in this government)
Rt. Hon Carwyn Jones AM	Labour		First Minister	13 May 2011 – 19 May 2016
Jane Hutt AM	Labour		Minister for Finance Leader of the House	13 May 2011 – 11 September 2014; 11 September 2014 - 19 May 2016
Edwina Hart AM	Labour		Minister for Business, Enterprise, Technology & Science	13 May 2011- 8 March 2013; 8 March 2013 – 19 May 2016
Leighton Andrews AM	Labour		Minister for Education and Skills; Minister for Public Services	13 May 2011 - 25 June 2013; 11 September 2014 - 19 May 2016
Lesley Griffiths AM	Labour		Minister for Health and Social Services; Minister for Local Government and Government Business; Minister for Communities and Tackling Poverty	13 May 2011 – 14 March 2013; 14 March 2013 – 11 September 2014; 11 September 2014 – 19 May 2016
Mark Drakeford AM	Labour		Minister for Health and Social Services	14 March 2013 - 19 May 2016
Huw Lewis AM	Labour		Minister for Housing, Regeneration & Heritage; Minister for Education and Skills	13 May 2011 - 26 June 2013; 26 June 2013 - 19 May 2016
Jeffery Cuthbert AM	Labour		Minister for Communities and Tackling Poverty	26 June 2013 - 11 September 2014
Carl Sargeant AM	Labour		Minister for Local Government and Communities; Minister for Natural Resources	13 May 2011 - 11 September 2014; 11 September 2014 - 19 May 2016
Alun Davies AM	Labour		Natural Resources and Food	14 March 2013 - 8 July 2014
John Griffiths AM	Labour		Minister for Environment and Sustainable Development; Minister for Culture and Sport	13 May 2011 - 14 March 2013; 14 March 2013 - 11 September 2014
Office holders given special provisions to attend Cabinet
Janice Gregory AM	Labour		Chief Whip	2011-2016
Theodore Huckle QC	Labour		Counsel General for Wales	2011-2016

== Junior Ministers ==
Name	Party	Image	Office(s)	Dates(s) (in this government)
Gwenda Thomas AM	Labour		Deputy Minister for Children & Social Services	13 May 2011 – 11 September 2014
Alun Davies AM	Labour		Deputy Minister for Agriculture	13 May 2011 -14 March 2013
Vaughan Gething AM	Labour		Deputy Minister for Tackling Poverty; Deputy Minister for Health	26 June 2013 - 11 September 2014; 11 September 2014 - 19 May 2016
Ken Skates AM	Labour		Deputy Minister for Skills and Technology; Deputy Minister for Culture, Sport and Tourism	26 June 2013 - 11 September 2014; 11 September 2014 - 19 May 2016
Rebecca Evans AM	Labour		Deputy Minister for Agriculture and Fisheries; Deputy Minister for Farming and Food	8 July 2014 – 11 September 2014; 11 September 2014 - 19 May 2016
Julie James AM	Labour		Deputy Minister for Skills and Technology	11 September 2014 – 19 May 2016
Jeff Cuthbert AM	Labour		Deputy Minister for Skills; Deputy Minister for Skills and Technology	13 May 2011 -14 March 2013; 14 March 2013 - 26 June 2013

== Changes ==
A significant reshuffle occurred on 8 March 2013, in which Mark Drakeford entered the cabinet as Health Minister.

Following the resignation of Leighton Andrews from the cabinet in June 2103 Jeff Cuthbert was promoted to the cabinet and Vaughan Gething and Ken Skates become junior ministers.

Alun Davies was sacked from the government on 8 July 2014, his responsibilities were temporarily restructured with some going to Rebecca Evans who joined the government as a junior minister. These responsibilities were further altered in a final significant reshuffle occurred on 11 September 2014 where Jeff Cuthbert, John Griffiths and Gwenda Thomas all left the government and Leighton Andrews returned to government while Julie James became a junior minister.

== See also ==
- Members of the 4th National Assembly for Wales
