= Cabinet Minister for Local Government, Housing and Planning =

Welsh Government cabinet minister

Cabinet Minister for Local Government, Housing and Planning of Wales
- Gweinidog Cabinet dros Lywodraeth Leol, Tai a Chynllunio (Welsh)

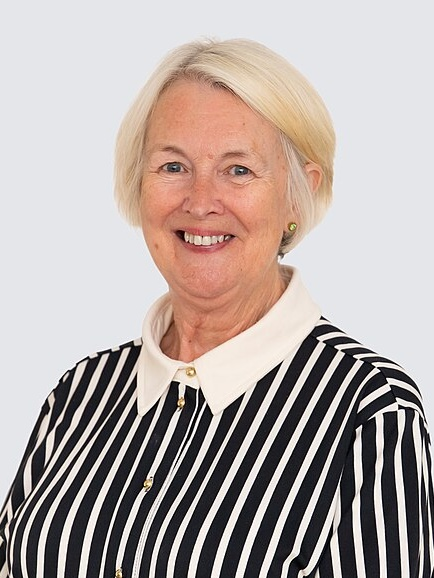
- Incumbent; Siân Gwenllian MS since 13 May 2026
- Welsh Government; Department of Local Government
- Style: Welsh Minister
- Status: Cabinet Minister
- Abbreviation: Local Government Minister
- Member of: the Senedd; Cabinet
- Reports to: the Senedd and the First Minister of Wales
- Seat: Cardiff
- Nominator: First Minister of Wales
- Appointer: The Crown
- Term length: Four years
- Formation: 12 May 1999
- First holder: Peter Law AM
- Salary: £124,713 (MS pay + £44,896 Welsh Minister pay)
- Website: https://www.gov.wales/sian-gwenllian-ms

The Cabinet Minister for Local Government, Housing and Planning (Welsh: Gweinidog Cabinet dros Lywodraeth Leol, Tai a Chynllunio) is a cabinet position in the Welsh Government which has existed in various forms since the creation of the Welsh Government. The current officeholder is Siân Gwenllian since May 2026.

The position has responsibility for housing in Wales.

== Ministers ==
The below shows all ministerial positions to cover the briefs of Housing and/or Local Government, as the role has not always been held by one Minister alone.

Name	Picture	Entered office	Left office	Political party	Government
Secretary for Local Government and Regeneration (1999–2000)
Peter Law AM		12 May 1999	9 February 2000	Labour	Michael government
Secretary for Local Government and Housing (2000)
Peter Law AM		9 February 2000	16 October 2000	Labour	Interim Rhodri Morgan administration
Minister for Finance and Local Government (2000–2007)
Edwina Hart AM		5 October 2000	1 May 2003	Labour	First Rhodri Morgan government
Sue Essex AM		1 May 2003	3 May 2007	Labour	Second Rhodri Morgan government
Minister for Social Justice and Local Government (2007–2011)
Brian Gibbons AM		19 July 2007	9 December 2009	Labour	Fourth Rhodri Morgan government
Carl Sargeant AM		9 December 2009	2011	Labour	First Jones government
Minister for Environment, Sustainability and Housing (2007–2011)
Jane Davidson AM		19 July 2007	2011	Labour	Fourth Morgan government
Jane Davidson AM		19 July 2007	2011	Labour	First Jones government
Minister for Housing Regeneration & Heritage Minister for Education and Skills (2011–2016)
Huw Lewis AM		11 May 2011	19 May 2016	Labour	Second Jones government
Minister for Local Government and Communities Minister for Natural Resources (2011–2016)
Carl Sargeant AM		11 May 2011	19 May 2016	Labour	Second Jones government
Minister for Housing and Regeneration (2016–2017)
Rebecca Evans AM		19 May 2016	November 2017	Labour	Third Jones government
Cabinet Secretary for Communities and Children (2016–17) Cabinet Secretary for Local Government and Public Services (2017–18)
Carl Sargeant AM		19 May 2016	3 November 2017	Labour	Third Jones government
Alun Davies AM		3 November 2017	13 December 2018	Labour	Third Jones government
Minister for Housing and Local Government (2018–2021) Minister for Climate Change (including Housing portfolio) (2021–2024)
Julie James MS		13 December 2018 (as Housing and Local Government)	13 May 2021 (as Housing and Local Government)	Labour	First Drakeford Government
Julie James MS		13 May 2021 (as Climate Change)	20 March 2024 (as Climate Change)	Labour	Second Drakeford Government
Minister for Finance and Local Government (2021–2024)
Rebecca Evans MS		13 May 2021	20 March 2024	Labour	Second Drakeford Government
Cabinet Secretary for Local Government
Julie James MS		21 March 2024	16 July 2024	Labour	Gething government
Jayne Bryant MS		17 July 2024	12 May 2026	Labour	Gething government
Jayne Bryant MS		17 July 2024	12 May 2026	Labour	Eluned Morgan government
Cabinet Minister for Local Government, Housing and Planning
Siân Gwenllian		13 May 2026	Incumbent	Plaid Cymru	ap Iorwerth government

== History ==
From 2018 to 2021, the position was titled as Minister for Housing and Local Government under the term of Julie James MS.

Following the 2021 Senedd election responsibilities involved with Local Government was merged with Finance responsibilities, and responsibilities on housing was transferred to a new 'super-ministry' (climate change) under Julie James.

Following the 2026 Senedd election the responsibilities of the minister was established under ap Iorwerth government to once again include housing and planning issues.

== Responsibilities ==
These are some of the responsibilities of the current role:

- Local Government performance, governance and constitutional matters, scrutiny arrangements, cabinets, elected mayors, the role of councillors, their diversity, conduct and remuneration
- Structural, democratic, financial and constitutional reform of Local Authorities including co-ordination of regional collaboration models
- Fire and Rescue Services including community fire safety
- Local Government electoral arrangements, sponsorship of the Democracy and Boundary Commission Cymru and the timing of Local Authority elections
- The un-hypothecated funding of Local Authorities and Police and Crime Commissioners through the Local Government revenue and capital settlements
- Housing and housing-related activities of Local Authorities and housing associations, including housing management and the allocation of social and affordable housing
- Supply and quality of market, social and affordable housing
- Second Homes
- Homelessness and housing advice
- Aids and adaptations, including Disabled Facilities Grants and Physical Adaptation Grants
- The provision of housing-related support (but not the payment of Housing Benefit)
- Warm Homes Scheme
- Fire safety in high-rise buildings
- Oversight and implementation of the Planning Acts and all aspects of planning policy and the determination of called-in planning applications and appeals
- Developments of National Significance: determination of planning applications and connected consents
- Building regulations
- Future Wales: the national plan 2040
- Regeneration, including Strategic Regeneration Areas; legacy regeneration; Transforming Town Centres and provision of sites and premises, derelict land and environmental improvements relating to regeneration
- Burials and cremation policy

== See also ==
- Housing in Wales
- Local government in Wales
- Welsh Local Government Association
