= Cabinet Secretary for Health and Social Care =

Cabinet Secretary for Health and Social Care may refer to

- Cabinet Secretary for Health and Social Care (Scotland), a Scottish government position
- Cabinet Secretary for Health and Social Care (Wales), a Welsh government position
