= Chief Whip (Wales) =

Welsh Government cabinet minister

Chief Whip of the Welsh Government
- Prif Chwip Lywodraeth Cymru (Welsh)

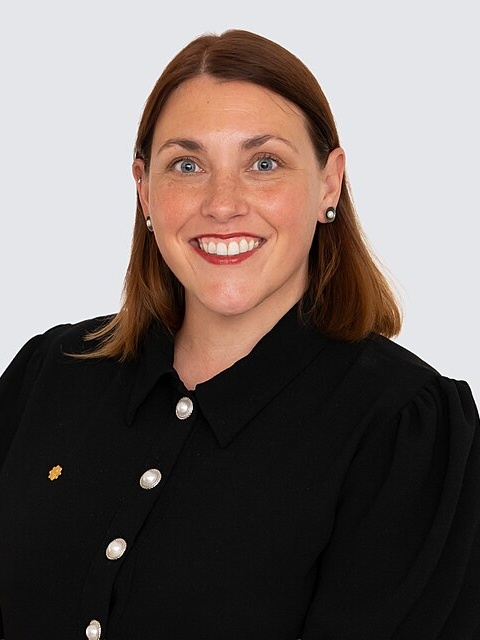
- Incumbent; Heledd Fychan since 13 May 2026
- Welsh Government
- Member of: Senedd; Cabinet
- Reports to: the Senedd and the First Minister of Wales
- Seat: Cardiff
- Nominator: First Minister of Wales
- Appointer: The Crown
- Term length: Subject to elections to the Senedd which take place every four years
- First holder: Andrew Davies AM
- Website: gov.wales/heledd-fychan-ms

The Chief Whip (Welsh: Prif Chwip) is a member of the cabinet in the Welsh Government. The current officeholder is Heledd Fychan since May 2026.

== Chief whips ==
Name	Picture	Entered office	Left office	Other offices held	Political party	Government	Refs.
Andrew Davies		12 May 1999	9 February 2000	Minister for Assembly Business	Labour	Michael administration	
Karen Sinclair		9 February 2000	2005	Minister for Assembly Business	Labour	Interim Rhodri Morgan administration	
Karen Sinclair		9 February 2000	2005	Minister for Assembly Business	Labour	First Rhodri Morgan government	
Karen Sinclair		9 February 2000	2005	Minister for Assembly Business	Labour	Second Rhodri Morgan government	
Jane Hutt		2005	2007	Minister for the Assembly Business	Labour	Second Rhodri Morgan government	
Jane Hutt		2005	2007	Minister for the Assembly Business	Labour	Third Rhodri Morgan government	
Carl Sargeant		31 May 2007	10 December 2009		Labour	Fourth Rhodri Morgan government	
Janice Gregory		10 December 2009	19 May 2016		Labour	First Jones government	
Janice Gregory		10 December 2009	19 May 2016		Labour	Second Jones government	
Jane Hutt		19 May 2016	3 November 2017	Leader of the House	Labour	Third Jones government	
Julie James		3 November 2017	13 December 2018	Leader of the House	Labour	Third Jones government	
Jane Hutt		13 December 2018	13 May 2021	Deputy minister	Labour	First Drakeford government	
Dawn Bowden		13 May 2021	3 May 2023	Deputy Minister for Arts and Sport Accountable to Minister for Economy	Labour	Second Drakeford government	
Jane Hutt		3 May 2023	12 May 2026	Minister for Social Justice (2018–2024)	Labour	Second Drakeford government	
Jane Hutt		3 May 2023	12 May 2026	Minister for Social Justice (2024) Trefnydd (2024–2026)	Labour	Gething government	
Jane Hutt		3 May 2023	12 May 2026	Trefnydd (2024–2026)	Labour	Eluned Morgan government	
Heledd Fychan		13 May 2026	Incumbent	Trefnydd (2026–) Cabinet Minister for Culture and Sport (2026–)	Plaid Cymru	ap Iorwerth government	

== Responsibilities ==
The main responsibility of Chief Whip is to ensure the Welsh Government's business can go through the Senedd, in particular securing the majority of votes the government holds to vote on its legislative and policy programmes. The chief whip attends the cabinet, and works with the business minister to timetable and secure passage of legislative competence orders and acts) (formerly measures). They also have the role to successfully complete the government's programme of legislation.

To maintain their responsibilities, whips use various methods. They manage the attendance of members in Senedd votes, and persuade them to vote with the government. The chief whip is also an important link not only between the government and the parliamentary (majority) party, but also between the government and opposition parties or the Assembly Parliamentary Service (now Senedd Commission) and presiding office. The chief whip would attends regular weekly meetings with key figures to discuss the Senedd's business arrangements, as well as cabinet meetings. They have daily contact with these key figures to deal with ongoing matters, timetabling and agenda issues. When legislation is to be passed, or for some other government business, discussions may arise between the chief whip and opposition whips, the minister overseeing Senedd business, or the whips' designated "shadow" counterpart, to resolve difficulties arising with amendments, the timing of a vote, and to resolve such issues a deal may be reached.

The chief whip also has contact with other whips concerning various matters, such as "pairing" and the intermittent filling of committee vacancies. The chief whip also manages the membership of committees and sub-committees. Discussions may follow these channels for other matters, such as changes coming from or presented to the Business Committee.

The chief whip also ensures that backbenchers use their electronic votes correctly. The whip (document) is circulated each week by whips of each party to their members and sets out the list of business for the following week, as well as the party's expectations for when Senedd members are to vote. To minimise the persuasion required for backbenchers to support the government, the Chief Whip advises the cabinet over the likely acceptability of any of its legislative proposals.

== See also ==
- Chief Whip
- Ministry
