= Minister for Housing =

Minister for Housing may refer to:

- Minister for Housing (Australia)

- Minister for Housing (New South Wales)
- Minister for Housing (Victoria)
- Minister for Housing (Western Australia)

- Minister for Housing (Sweden)
- Minister for Housing (United Kingdom)

- Minister for Housing (Scotland)
- Minister for Housing (Wales)
