= First Drakeford government =

Welsh government (2018–2021)

- 10th devolved government of Wales
- 2018–2021
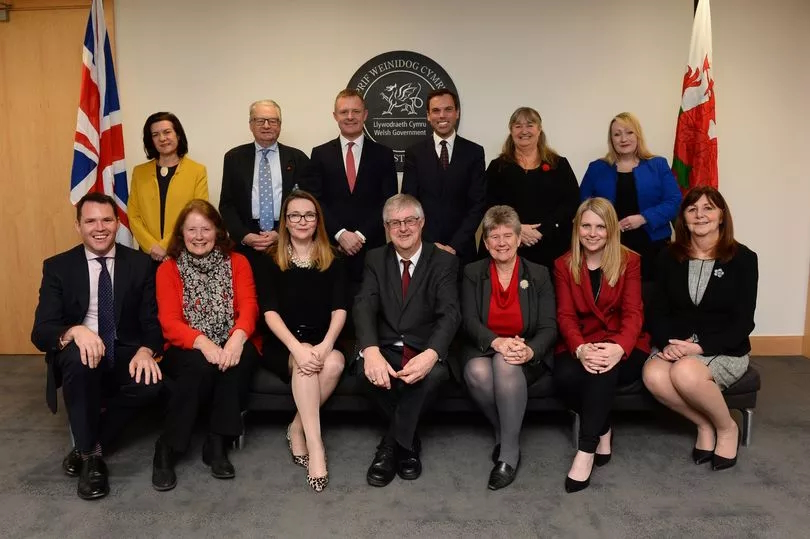
- Drakeford's first cabinet on 13 December 2018
- Date formed: 13 December 2018
- Date dissolved: 13 May 2021

People and organisations
- Monarch: Elizabeth II
- First Minister: Mark Drakeford
- First Minister's history: 2018–2024
- Member parties: Labour (29); Liberal Democrats (1); Independent (1)
- Status in legislature: Majority (coalition)
- Opposition cabinet: Third Shadow Cabinet of Andrew RT Davies
- Opposition party: Conservative; (2018-2021)
- Opposition leader: Paul Davies (2018–2021); Andrew R. T. Davies (2021)

History
- Incoming formation: 2018 Welsh Labour leadership election
- Outgoing election: 2021 Senedd election
- Legislature term: 5th National Assembly
- Predecessor: Third Jones government
- Successor: Second Drakeford government

The first Drakeford government was a Labour-led government formed after the resignation of Carwyn Jones as First Minister of Wales on 12 December 2018, and the subsequent appointment of Mark Drakeford in his place following a leadership contest. The government was also supported by the sole Welsh Liberal Democrat MS Kirsty Williams and the independent MS Dafydd Elis-Thomas. Drakeford's first term as First Minister is known for his handling of the COVID-19 pandemic.

Between May 2016 and December 2018 the senior tier of ministers were referred to as Cabinet Secretaries and the junior tier as Ministers, from the formation of this government they reverted to their previous titles of Cabinet Ministers and Deputy Ministers respectively.

Following the 2021 Senedd election, Labour was re-elected to a sixth term with Mark Drakeford continuing as First Minister.

== Appointment ==
2018 Nomination of First Minister
Date:	12 December 2018
Candidate	Votes
Mark Drakeford (Labour)	30 / 56
Paul Davies (Conservative)	12 / 56
Adam Price (Plaid Cymru)	9 / 56
Abstentions	5 / 56
Source: Senedd

== Cabinet ==
Portfolio	Name	Constituency	Party	Term
First Minister	Mark Drakeford MS	Cardiff West	Labour	2018–2021
Minister for Finance; Trefnydd (House Leader)	Rebecca Evans MS	Gower	Labour	2018–2021
Minister for Health and Social Services	Vaughan Gething MS	Cardiff South and Penarth	Labour	2016–2021
Minister for International Relations and the Welsh Language	The Baroness Morgan of Ely MS	Mid & West Wales	Labour	2018–2021
Minister for Economy, Transport and North Wales	Ken Skates MS	Clwyd South	Labour	2016–2021
Minister for Housing and Local Government	Julie James MS	Swansea West	Labour	2018–2021
Minister for Education	Kirsty Williams MS	Brecon and Radnorshire	Liberal Democrat	2016–2021
Minister for Environment, Energy and Rural Affairs	Lesley Griffiths MS	Wrexham	Labour	2016–2021
Counsel General for Wales Minister for European Transition	Jeremy Miles MS	Neath	Labour	2018–2021

== Deputy ministers ==
Portfolio	Name	Constituency	Party	Term
Deputy Minister & Chief Whip	Jane Hutt MS	Vale of Glamorgan	Labour	2018–2021
Deputy Minister for Health and Social Services	Julie Morgan MS	Cardiff North	Labour	2018–2021
Deputy Minister for Culture, Sport and Tourism	The Lord Elis-Thomas MS	Dwyfor Meirionnydd	Independent	2017–2021
Deputy Minister for Economy and Transport	Lee Waters MS	Llanelli	Labour	2018–2021
Deputy Minister for Housing and Local Government	Hannah Blythyn MS	Delyn	Labour	2018–2021

== See also ==
- Shadow Cabinet (Wales)
- Members of the 5th Senedd
- 2018 Welsh Labour leadership election
- 2021 Senedd election
