= Second Drakeford government =

Welsh government (2021–2024)

- 11th devolved government of Wales
- 2021–2024
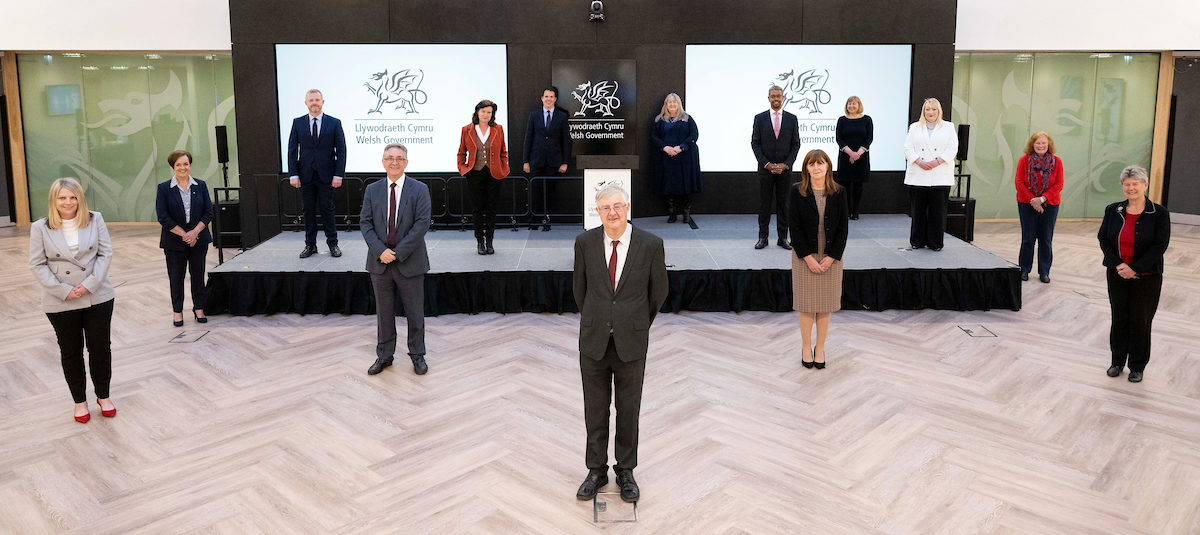
- Drakeford's socially distanced second cabinet on 13 May 2021
- Date formed: 13 May 2021
- Date dissolved: 20 March 2024

People and organisations
- Monarch: Elizabeth II; Charles III
- First Minister: Mark Drakeford
- First Minister's history: 2018–2024
- Member parties: Labour
- Status in legislature: Minority in co-operation with Plaid Cymru
- Opposition cabinet: Fourth Shadow Cabinet of Andrew RT Davies
- Opposition party: Conservative
- Opposition leader: Andrew R. T. Davies

History
- Outgoing formation: February–March 2024 Welsh Labour leadership election
- Election: 2021 Senedd election
- Legislature term: 6th Senedd
- Predecessor: First Drakeford government
- Successor: Gething government

The second Drakeford government was the Labour-led government formed after the 2021 Senedd Election on 6 May 2021, with Mark Drakeford re-appointed as First Minister without opposition on 12 May 2021.

== Appointment ==
On 12 May 2021, Mark Drakeford was the only person nominated for the position (by Rebecca Evans), and was subsequently recommended by the Presiding Officer to be appointed as First Minister.

== Cabinet ==
Portfolio	Name	Constituency	Party	Term
First Minister	Mark Drakeford MS	Cardiff West	Labour	2018–2024
Minister for Finance and Local Government	Rebecca Evans MS	Gower	Labour	2021–2024
Minister for Health and Social Services	The Baroness Morgan of Ely MS	Mid & West Wales	Labour	2021–2024
Minister for the Economy	Vaughan Gething MS	Cardiff South and Penarth	Labour	2021–2024
Minister for Rural Affairs and North Wales, and Trefnydd (House Leader)	Lesley Griffiths MS	Wrexham	Labour	2021–2024
Minister for Social Justice and Chief Whip	Jane Hutt MS	Vale of Glamorgan	Labour	2021–2024
Minister for Climate Change	Julie James MS	Swansea West	Labour	2021–2024
Minister for Education and the Welsh Language	Jeremy Miles MS	Neath	Labour	2021–2024
Counsel General and Minister for the Constitution	Mick Antoniw MS	Pontypridd	Labour	2021–2024

== Deputy ministers ==
Portfolio	Name	Constituency	Party	Term
Deputy Minister for Mental Health and Wellbeing	Lynne Neagle MS	Torfaen	Labour	2021–2024
Deputy Minister for Social Services	Julie Morgan MS	Cardiff North	Labour	2018–2024
Deputy Minister for Arts and Sport; Deputy Minister for Arts, Sport and Tourism (2023–2024)	Dawn Bowden MS	Merthyr Tydfil and Rhymney	Welsh Labour	2021–2024
Deputy Minister for Climate Change	Lee Waters MS	Llanelli	Labour	2021–2024
Deputy Minister for Social Partnership	Hannah Blythyn MS	Delyn	Labour	2021–2024

== See also ==
- Shadow Cabinet (Wales)
- Members of the 6th Senedd
- 2021 Senedd election
- 2021 Welsh Labour–Plaid Cymru agreement
