= Minister for Social Justice =

Minister for Social Justice may refer to:

- Minister for Housing (Scotland), a Scottish Government position, incorporating the previous post "Minister for Social Justice".
- Cabinet Secretary for Social Justice, a Scottish Government position
- Minister for Social Justice (Wales), a Welsh Government position
