= Cabinet Minister for Social Justice and Equality =

Welsh Government cabinet minister

Cabinet Minister for Social Justice and Equality of Wales
- Gweinidog y Cabinet dros Gyfiawnder Cymdeithasol a Chydraddoldeb (Welsh)

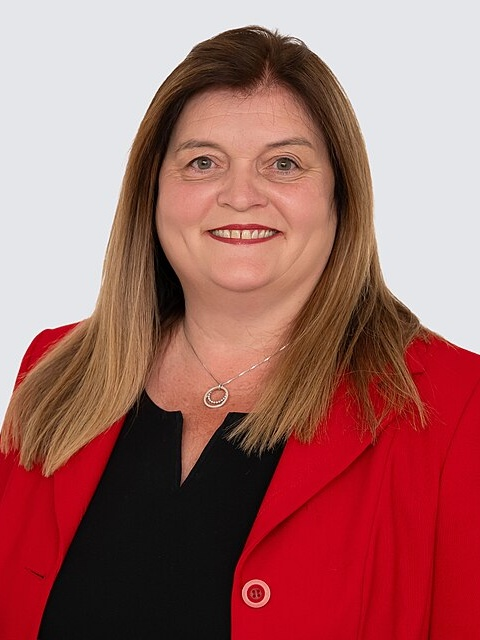
- Incumbent; Sioned Williams MS since 13 May 2026
- Welsh Government
- Style: Welsh Minister
- Status: Cabinet Minister
- Abbreviation: Minister
- Member of: Senedd; Cabinet
- Reports to: the Senedd and the First Minister of Wales
- Seat: Cardiff
- Nominator: First Minister of Wales
- Appointer: The Crown
- Term length: Five years Subject to elections to the Senedd which take place every five years
- First holder: Edwina Hart AM
- Salary: £124,713 (MS pay + £44,896 Welsh Minister pay)
- Website: www.gov.wales/sioned-williams-ms

The Cabinet Minister for Social Justice and Equality (Welsh: Gweinidog y Cabinet dros Gyfiawnder Cymdeithasol a Chydraddoldeb) is a member of the Cabinet in the Welsh Government. The current officeholder is Sioned Williams since May 2026.

== Ministers ==
Name	Picture	Entered office	Left office	Other offices held	Political party	Government	Notes
Minister for Social Justice and Regeneration
Edwina Hart		9 May 2003	31 May 2007		Labour	Second Rhodri Morgan government	
Minister for Social Justice and Public Service Delivery
Andrew Davies		31 May 2007	19 July 2007		Labour	Third Rhodri Morgan government	
Minister for Social Justice and Local Government
Brian Gibbons		19 July 2007	10 December 2009	Minister for Local Government	Labour	Fourth Rhodri Morgan government	
Carl Sargeant		10 December 2009	May 2011	Minister for Local Government	Labour	First Jones government	
Minister for Social Justice
Jane Hutt		13 May 2021	21 March 2024	Chief Whip (2023–2024)	Labour	Second Drakeford government	
Cabinet Secretary for Culture and Social Justice
Lesley Griffiths		21 March 2024	16 July 2024		Labour	Gething government	
Jane Hutt		17 July 2024	11 September 2024	Chief Whip; Trefnydd of the Senedd	Labour	Gething government	
Jane Hutt		17 July 2024	11 September 2024	Chief Whip; Trefnydd of the Senedd	Labour	Eluned Morgan government	
Cabinet Secretary for Social Justice
Jane Hutt		11 September 2024	12 May 2026	Chief Whip; Trefnydd of the Senedd	Labour	Eluned Morgan government	
Cabinet Minister for Social Justice and Equality
Sioned Williams		13 May 2026	Incumbent	Deputy First Minister	Plaid Cymru	ap Iorwerth government	

== History ==
The office-holder had also organised some of the Welsh Government's support to Ukraine following that country's invasion by Russia, as well as welcoming those who arrived in Wales from Ukraine. The holder also was supporting and preparing for the devolution of more powers from the UK Government, such as youth justice, probation and policing.

As a Welsh Minister, the holder would have an annual salary of £124,713 for 2026–2027.

Since May 2026 the current officeholder is Sioned Williams who is also the Deputy First Minister.

== Responsibilities ==
These are the current responsibilities of the Social Justice post:

- Children's and young people's rights, entitlements and advocacy
- Early years, childcare and play policy, including the Childcare offer and workforce
- Cynnal Payment
- Family Support policy and programmes
- Parenting
- Adverse Childhood Experiences
- Co-ordination of cross-cutting measures to promote prosperity and tackle poverty
- Co-ordination of measures to mitigate Child Poverty
- DWP Liaison and engagement with UKG Welfare policy
- Welsh Benefit System
- Fuel and food poverty
- Financial inclusion, including credit unions
- Equality and Human Rights
- Diversity and inclusion guidance for elections
- Co-ordination of issues relating to Gypsies, Roma and Travellers, Asylum-seekers, refugees, migration and community cohesion
- Anti-slavery, domestic abuse, gender-based violence and sexual violence
- The Voluntary sector and volunteering
- Social Partnership
- Relationship with the Older People's Commissioner for Wales, Children's Commissioner for Wales, Future Generations Commissioner for Wales and the Public Services Ombudsman for Wales
- Lead on policy in relation to the Armed Forces, Veterans and Cadets in Wales
- Wales and Africa
- Lead on policy in relation to justice policy issues
- Youth Justice and Female Offending blueprints
- Community cohesion
- Community Safety, including Police Community Support Officers
- Relations with the Police and Crime Commissioners, Police and other Criminal Justice agencies
- Relations with UK government in respect of Prisons and the Probation Service
- Advice and Advocacy Services
- Lead responsibility for monitoring Post Office and Royal Mail matters in Wales
- Oversight of the distribution of Lottery funding within Wales

== See also ==
- Ministry
