= Cabinet Secretary for Rural Affairs =

Cabinet Secretary for Rural Affairs may refer to:

- Cabinet Secretary for Rural Affairs (Wales), a Welsh government position
- Cabinet Secretary for Rural Affairs, Land Reform and Islands, a Scottish government position
