= Trefnydd of the Senedd =

Welsh Government cabinet minister

- Trefnydd Senedd Cymru (Welsh)

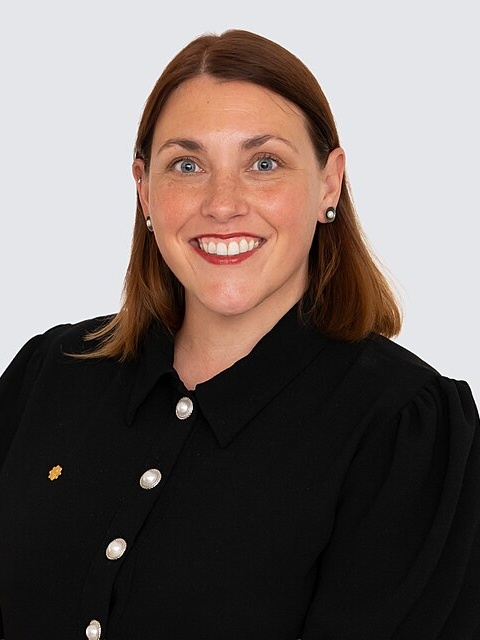
- Incumbent; Heledd Fychan MS since 13 May 2026
- Welsh Government
- Style: Welsh Minister
- Status: Cabinet Minister
- Abbreviation: Minister
- Member of: Senedd; Cabinet
- Reports to: the Senedd and the First Minister of Wales
- Seat: Cardiff
- Nominator: First Minister of Wales
- Appointer: The Crown
- Term length: Four years; Subject to elections to the Senedd which take place every four years
- First holder: Andrew Davies AM
- Website: www.gov.wales

The Trefnydd, or Leader of the House in English, and formerly Minister for Assembly Business, is a member of the Cabinet in the Welsh Government, who manages the government's business in the Senedd (the Welsh Parliament; Welsh: Senedd Cymru; formerly the National Assembly for Wales). The current trefnydd is Heledd Fychan, since May 2026.

== Ministers ==
| Name | Picture | Entered office | Left office | Other offices held | Political party | Government | Notes |
Business Secretary
| Andrew Davies | | 12 May 1999 | 22 February 2000 | | Labour | Michael administration | |
Minister for Assembly Business
| Andrew Davies | | 22 February 2000 | 16 October 2000 | | Labour | Interim Rhodri Morgan administration | |
Business Manager
| Andrew Davies | | 16 October 2000 | 26 February 2002 | | Labour | First Rhodri Morgan government | |
| Carwyn Jones | | 26 February 2002 | May 2003 | Minister for Open Government (June 2002–) | Labour | First Rhodri Morgan government | |
Minister for Assembly Business
| Karen Sinclair | | 9 May 2003 | 10 January 2005 | Chief Whip | Labour | Second Rhodri Morgan government | |
Business Manager
| Jane Hutt | | 10 January 2005 | May 2007 | | Labour | Second Rhodri Morgan government | |
Minister for (Assembly) Business
| Jane Hutt | | 31 May 2007 | 19 July 2007 | Minister for Budget | Labour | Third Rhodri Morgan government | |
Leader of the House
| Carwyn Jones | | 19 July 2007 | 10 December 2009 | Counsel General | Labour | Fourth Rhodri Morgan government | |
Minister for (Assembly) Business
| Jane Hutt | | 10 December 2009 | May 2011 | Minister for Budget | Labour | First Jones government | |
Minister for Government Business
| Jane Hutt | | 11 September 2014 | 2016 | Minister for Finance | Labour | Second Jones government | |
Leader of the House
| Jane Hutt | | 19 May 2016 | 3 November 2017 | Chief Whip | Labour | Third Jones government | |
| Julie James | | 3 November 2017 | 13 December 2018 | Chief Whip | Labour | Third Jones government | |
Trefnydd
| Rebecca Evans | | 13 December 2018 | 13 May 2021 | Minister for Finance | Labour | First Drakeford government | |
| Lesley Griffiths | | 13 May 2021 | 22 March 2024 | Minister for Rural Affairs Minister for North Wales | Labour | Second Drakeford government | |
| Jane Hutt | | 22 March 2024 | 12 May 2026 | Chief Whip | Labour | Gething government | |
| Heledd Fychan | | 13 May 2026 | Incumbent | Chief Whip, Cabinet Minister for Culture and Sport | Plaid Cymru | ap Iorwerth government | |

== Responsibilities ==
The post is responsible for organising government business in the Senedd.

In May 2016, alongside the role of Chief Whip, the Leader of the House's responsibilities were:

- To manage the government's business within the Assembly (now Senedd), in line with standing orders.
- To deliver a business statement weekly
- To represent the government on the Business Committee

== See also ==
- Ministry
