= Cabinet Minister for Rural Resilience and Sustainability =

Welsh Government cabinet minister

Cabinet Minister for Rural Resilience and Sustainability of Wales
- Gweinidog Cabinet dros Wydnwch Gwledig a Chynaliadwyedd (Welsh)

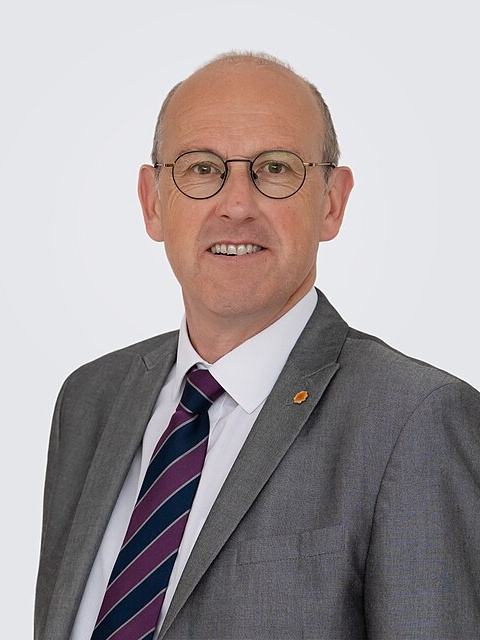
- Incumbent; Llyr Gruffydd MS since 13 May 2026
- Welsh Government
- Style: Welsh Cabinet Secretary
- Status: Cabinet Secretary
- Member of: Senedd; Cabinet
- Reports to: the Senedd and the First Minister of Wales
- Seat: Cardiff
- Nominator: First Minister of Wales
- Appointer: The Crown
- Term length: Four years; Subject to elections to the Senedd which take place every four years

The Cabinet Minister for Rural Resilience and Sustainability (Welsh: Gweinidog Cabinet dros Wydnwch Gwledig a Chynaliadwyedd) is a member of the cabinet in the Welsh Government. The current officeholder is Llyr Gruffydd since May 2026.

== Ministers ==
Name	Picture	Entered office	Left office	Other offices held	Political party	Government	Notes
Secretary for Agriculture and Rural Economy
Christine Gwyther		12 May 1999	22 February 2000		Labour	Michael government Interim Morgan government	
Secretary for Agriculture and Rural Development
Christine Gwyther		22 February 2000	23 July 2000		Labour	Interim Morgan government	
Carwyn Jones		23 July 2000	16 October 2000		Labour	Interim Morgan government	
Minister for Rural Affairs
Carwyn Jones		16 October 2000			Labour	First Morgan government	
Minister for Assembly Business and Rural Affairs
Carwyn Jones		26 February 2002	17 June 2002	Minister for Assembly Business	Labour	First Morgan government	
Minister for Rural Affairs and Wales Abroad
Mike German		18 June 2002	1 May 2003	Deputy First Minister of Wales	Liberal Democrat	First Morgan government	
Minister for Environment, Planning and Countryside
Carwyn Jones		9 May 2003	2007		Labour	Second Morgan government	
Minister for Rural Affairs
Elin Jones		9 July 2007	11 May 2011		Plaid Cymru	Fourth Morgan government (One Wales coalition of Plaid Cymru and Welsh Labour) First Jones government	
Cabinet Secretary for Environment and Rural Affairs
Lesley Griffiths		19 May 2016	3 November 2017		Labour	Third Jones government	
Cabinet Secretary for Energy, Planning and Rural Affairs
Lesley Griffiths		3 November 2017	13 December 2018		Labour	Third Jones government	
Minister for Environment, Energy and Rural Affairs
Lesley Griffiths		13 December 2018	13 May 2021		Labour	First Drakeford government	
Minister for Rural Affairs, North Wales and Trefnydd
Lesley Griffiths		13 May 2021	20 March 2024	Minister for North Wales Trefnydd	Labour	Second Drakeford government	
Cabinet Secretary for Rural Affairs
Huw Irranca-Davies		21 March 2024	12 May 2026	Cabinet Secretary for Climate Change	Labour	Gething government	
Cabinet Minister for Rural Resilience and Sustainability
Llyr Gruffydd		13 May 2026	Incumbent		Plaid Cymru	ap Iorwerth government	

== Responsibilities ==
The responsibilities of the post, as of December 2023, are to oversee:

- Programme for Rural Development
- Future farming policy, and the direct payments made to farmers
- Development of the agriculture sector, including wages and skills
- Genetically modified crops
- Development of the agri-food sector, its associated supply chains, and the promotion and marketing of food and drink from Wales
- Animal health and welfare, including the Bovine TB Eradication Plan
- General policy on livestock, poultry, equines, companion animals, and bees, as well as artificial insemination
- Policy on identifying and moving livestock
- Holding registration policy
- Protection and management of wildlife, including the control of pests, injurious vermin and weeds and the regulation of plant health, seeds and pesticides
- Oversee the management of inland, coastal and sea fisheries, including policy regulation and enforcement, also overseeing the Common Fisheries Policy and the management of fishery harbours
- Power to require provision of information about crop prices
- REACH and Chemical policy
- New National Park

As a Welsh Minister, the holder is to have an annual salary of £105,701 for 2020–2021.

== History ==
When the assembly was established, it was expected that the first holder of the "agriculture and rural affairs portfolio" would be Ron Davies, Labour AM for Caerphilly and former Welsh Labour leader and Welsh Secretary. The shunning of Davies, by his successor Alun Michael, First Secretary of Wales, in Michael's cabinet, was described to be a disappointment and a surprise by Davies. By 2000, there was also a "deputy minister for Rural Affairs, Culture and Environment", with Delyth Evans AM holding the position in Rhodri Morgan's Labour–Liberal Democrate cabinet from 17 October 2000 to 31 July 2002.

During Plaid Cymru's Elin Jones' tenure in the role from 2007, she became notable for implementing some decisions while Minister for Rural Affairs. She announced the mass cull of Wales’ badger population in an effort to reduce bovine TB. While in the role, Jones clashed with the UK Government by supporting the EU's Common Agricultural Policy, and opposed the idea of selling woodland as is the practice in England. In 2010, Jones set out a horticulture plan while in the role. Following the 2011 National Assembly for Wales election, Labour decided to form a government without Plaid Cymru, therefore Jones was not returned to the role. Carwyn Jones, then first minister, was criticised in 2011 for not including a "rural affairs" role in his cabinet.

The position was reestablished in 2016, following the appointment of Lesley Griffiths as Cabinet Secretary for the Environment and Rural Affairs.

== See also ==
- Ministry
