= Heledd Fychan =

Plaid Cymru politician

Heledd Fychan MS
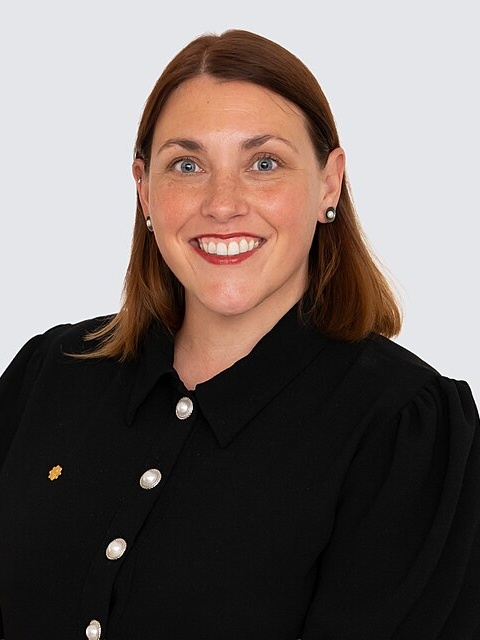
- Official portrait, 2026

Cabinet Minister for Culture and Sport
- Incumbent
- Assumed office 13 May 2026
- First Minister: Rhun ap Iorwerth
- Preceded by: Jane Hutt

Trefnydd of the Senedd Chief Whip
- Incumbent
- Assumed office 13 May 2026
- First Minister: Rhun ap Iorwerth
- Preceded by: Jane Hutt

Member of the Senedd
- Incumbent
- Assumed office 8 May 2021
- Constituency: South Wales Central (2021-2026); Pontypridd Cynon Merthyr (since 2026)

Rhondda Cynon Taf County Borough Councillor for Pontypridd
- In office 5 May 2017 – 9 May 2022
- Preceded by: Steve Carter
- Succeeded by: Dawn Wood

Personal details
- Born: 20 September 1980 (age 46) Bangor, Gwynedd, Wales
- Party: Plaid Cymru
- Education: Trinity College Dublin; Bangor University
- Website: www.heleddfychan.wales (in English) www.heleddfychan.cymru (in Welsh)

Heledd Fychan (born 20 September 1980) is a Welsh politician, who represented South Wales Central from May 2021 to April 2026, and Pontypridd Cynon Merthyr since May 2026. She is a former director of policy and political education for Plaid Cymru.

== Early life and education ==
Fychan is originally from Anglesey, and is the daughter of the late Vaughan Hughes, a broadcaster, journalist and local councillor — and Angharad Anwyl. Heledd attended Ysgol Gynradd y Talwrn and Ysgol David Hughes and then studied History and Politics at Trinity College Dublin, where she served as Education Sabbatical Officer at the Trinity College Students' Union, and later as Education Sabbatical Officer for the Union of Students in Ireland.

After completing a master's degree in Medieval History at Bangor University, Fychan worked for the Plaid Cymru group in London.

== Career ==
Fychan worked for 12 years at the National Museum Wales, serving as Head of Policy and Public Affairs, and was also a lead for governance, strategy, internal communications, international relations and stakeholder engagement.

In 2009, Fychan was elected to the board of the Museums Association. She chaired the Ethics Committee and the Nations Committee, attending multiple international conferences.

=== Political career ===
Fychan contested Montgomeryshire in the 2010 general election and North Wales in the 2011 National Assembly for Wales election. She later unsuccessfully sought the Plaid Cymru nomination ahead of the 2013 Ynys Môn by-election.

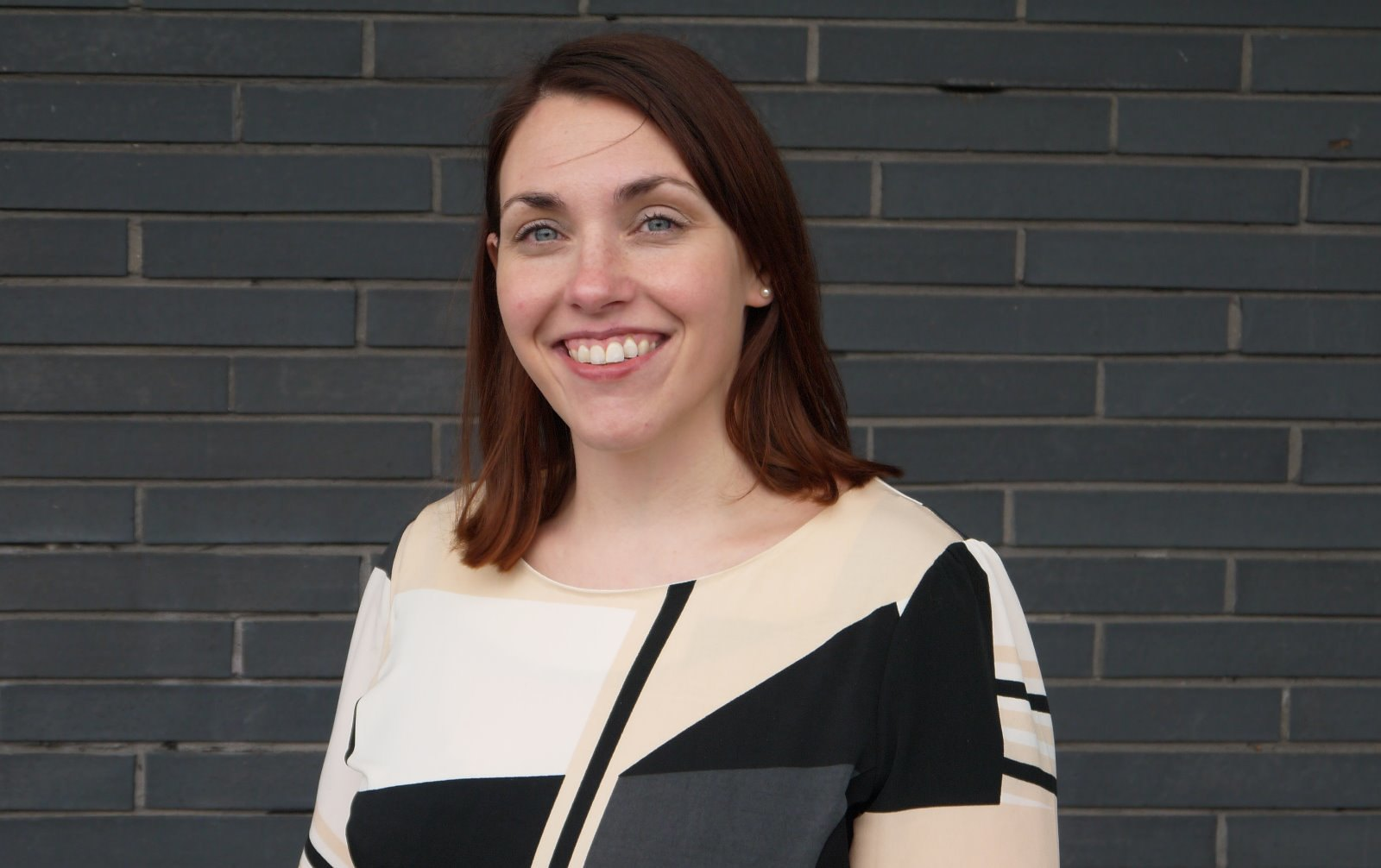
Fychan in 2019

==== Local Government ====
In May 2017, Fychan was elected for Pontypridd Town ward on Rhondda Cynon Taf County Borough Council and also Pontypridd Town Council.

As a local councillor, Fychan was a vocal community activist. In 2017 she successfully campaigned to reopen Mill Street Post Office and in 2018 she campaigned to save the Muni Arts Centre in Pontypridd, of which she was a volunteer trustee. In 2020, she dealt with severe flooding in Pontypridd and led calls for an independent inquiry.

==== Senedd Cymru - The Welsh Parliament ====
Fychan was selected in May 2020 to be the Plaid Cymru candidate for the Pontypridd constituency for the 2021 Senedd election. She came second in the election, behind Labour's Mick Antoniw, with 22.4% of the vote but was elected to the Senedd from the South Wales Central regional list.

Following the election Fychan became Plaid Cymru's spokesperson on culture, sport and international affairs.

Fychan has served as Plaid Cymru's director of policy and political education.

As MS for South Wales Central, Heledd Fychan called for a full investigation into the deaths of two boys after a police chase in Ely, Cardiff and the events following the incident.

From 2021 until April 2026, Fychan served on the Senedd business committee; children, young people and education committee, and the Reform Bill committee. She chaired the Wales International cross party group and was vice-chair of the Public and Commercial Services Union group. She was a member of the following cross-party groups: academic staff in universities, arts and health, autism, children and families, children in our care, clean air, friends of Ukraine, lung health, music, peace and reconciliation, poverty, public transport, school food, tourism, universities, and women.

===== Welsh Government =====
Following her re-election to the Senedd in May 2026 she became the Trefnydd, Chief Whip and Cabinet Minister for Culture and Sport.

== Personal life ==
Fychan lives in Pontypridd with her husband and son.
