= Second Rhodri Morgan government =

Welsh government (2003–2007)

- 4th devolved government of Wales
- 2003-2007
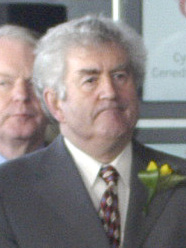
- Date formed: 1 May 2003
- Date dissolved: 26 May 2007

People and organisations
- Monarch: Elizabeth II
- First Minister: Rhodri Morgan
- Member party: Labour
- Status in legislature: Minority
- Opposition party: Plaid Cymru
- Opposition leader: Ieuan Wyn Jones

History
- Election: 2003 National Assembly for Wales election
- Outgoing election: 2007 National Assembly for Wales election
- Legislature term: 2nd National Assembly for Wales
- Predecessor: First Rhodri Morgan government
- Successor: Third Rhodri Morgan government

The second Rhodri Morgan government (2003–2007) was a Labour government in Wales.

Having won 30 out of the 60 seats available in the 2003 election and with the non-voting Presiding Officer and Deputy both coming from the opposition, the Labour party were able to form a majority government with 30 seats to the opposition's 28 with Rhodri Morgan continuing as First Minister.

This majority continued until Peter Law left Labour in 2005 to sit as an independent on the opposition benches, giving the government 29 and the opposition (excluding the Presiding Officer and Deputy) 29.

Two members of the National Assembly were elected to the UK Parliament at the 2005 UK general election (David Davies and Peter Law) reducing the collective strength of the opposition for day-to-day business. The final budget of this Assembly term passed following an agreement with Plaid during which their 11 voting members abstained.

== Cabinet ==
Office	Portrait	Name	Term	Party
First Minister		Rhodri Morgan	2003–2005	Labour
Minister for Assembly Business Chief Whip		Karen Sinclair	2003–2005	Labour
Minister for Culture, Welsh Language and Sport		Alun Pugh	2003–2005	Labour
Minister for Economic Development and Transport		Andrew Davies	2003–2005	Labour
Minister for Education		Jane Davidson	2003–2005	Labour
Minister for Environment and Rural Affairs		Carwyn Jones	2003–2005	Labour
Minister for Finance and Local Government		Sue Essex	2003–2005	Labour
Minister for Health & Social Care		Jane Hutt	2003–2005	Labour
Minister for Social Justice and Regeneration		Edwina Hart	2003–2005	Labour

== Junior ministers ==
Office	Portrait	Name	Term	Party
Deputy Minister for Economic Development and Transport		Dr. Brian Gibbons	2007	Labour
Deputy Minister for Health and Social Care		John Griffiths	2007	Labour
Deputy Minister for Social Justice and Regeneration		Huw Lewis	2007	Labour

== September 2005 Re-shuffle ==
Following a mid-term re-shuffle in September 2005 Jane Hutt was removed from her post as Health and Social Care Minister after controversy over long waiting lists and criticism from AMs to Minister for Assembly Business along with the additional responsibilities of Equalities & Children. Karen Sinclair remained as Chief Whip to the Labour party allowing her to stay in the cabinet as an observer.

Further changes were the promotion of Brian Gibbons from a junior minister to Minister for Health & Social Care, along with the promotion of Tamsin Dunwoody & Christine Chapman to Deputy Ministers and a few minor changes to existing members roles.

=== Cabinet ===
Office	Portrait	Name	Term	Party
First Minister		Rhodri Morgan	2005–2007	Labour
Minister for Assembly Business, Equalities & Children		Jane Hutt	2005–2007	Labour
Minister for Culture, Welsh Language and Sport		Alun Pugh	2005–2007	Labour
Minister for Enterprise, Innovation and Networks		Andrew Davies	2005–2007	Labour
Minister for Education, Lifelong Learning & Skills		Jane Davidson	2005–2007	Labour
Minister for Environment, Planning and Countryside		Carwyn Jones	2005–2007	Labour
Minister for Finance, Local Government and Public Services		Sue Essex	2005–2007	Labour
Minister for Health & Social Care		Brian Gibbons	2005–2007	Labour
Minister for Social Justice and Regeneration		Edwina Hart	2005–2007	Labour
Office holders given special provisions to attend Cabinet
Chief Whip		Karen Sinclair	2005–2007	Labour

=== Junior ministers ===
Office	Portrait	Name	Term	Party
Deputy Minister for Enterprise, Innovation and Networks and for Environment, Planning & Countryside		Tamsin Dunwoody	2005–2007	Labour
Deputy Minister for Finance, Local Government & Public Services & Education, Lifelong Learning & Skills		Christine Chapman	2005–2007	Labour
Deputy Minister for Health & Social Services (Older People & Public Health)		John Griffiths	2005–2007	Labour
Deputy Minister for Social Justice & Regeneration (Communities)		Huw Lewis	2005–2007	Labour

== See also ==
- List of Welsh Assembly Governments
- 2003 National Assembly for Wales election
- Members of the 2nd National Assembly for Wales
