= Counsel General for Wales =

Law officer of the Welsh Government

- Cwnsler Cyffredinol Cymru (Welsh)

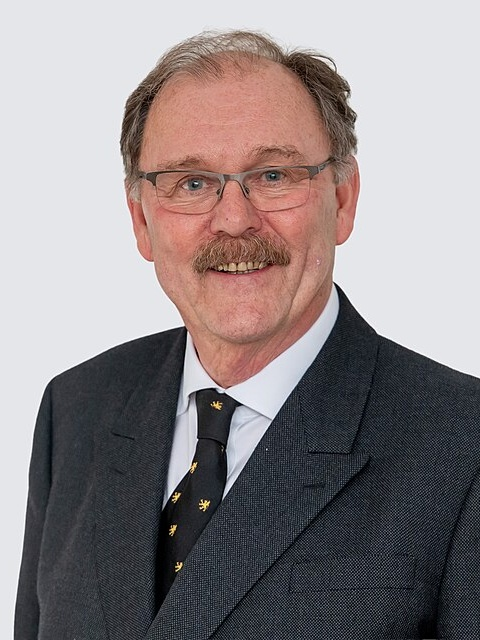
- Incumbent; Elfyn Llwyd since 12 May 2026
- Welsh Government
- Style: Welsh Minister
- Status: Law officer of the Crown
- Abbreviation: Counsel General
- Member of: the Senedd; Cabinet
- Reports to: the Senedd and the First Minister of Wales
- Seat: Cardiff
- Nominator: First Minister of Wales
- Appointer: The Crown
- Term length: Five years; Subject to elections to the Senedd which take place every five years
- Formation: 19 July 2007
- First holder: Carwyn Jones AM

The Counsel General for Wales (Welsh: Cwnsler Cyffredinol Cymru) is the Welsh Government's Law Officer (akin to the role of attorney general in other Common law jurisdictions), which means the government's chief legal adviser and representative in the courts. In addition to these "lawyer" roles the Counsel General also works to uphold the rule of law and integrity of the legal community in Wales, and has a number of important specific statutory functions, some of which are to be exercised independently of government and in the public interest.

The Counsel General is appointed by the sovereign on the recommendation of the First Minister of Wales. The recommendation of the First Minister to appoint or remove the Counsel General can only be made if approved by the Senedd. The Counsel General is a member of the Welsh Government and attends Cabinet meetings at the invitation of the First Minister. Although not a minister, the Counsel General is bound by the Ministerial Code which makes some specific provision in relation to the role.

On 13 May 2026 Rhun ap Iorwerth proposed Elfyn Llwyd as Counsel General designate. He was confirmed in the role in June 2026.

== The Counsel General's statutory responsibilities ==
The Counsel General's statutory responsibilities are found in the Government of Wales Act 2006

- Like the Welsh Ministers and the First Minister, the Counsel General may make representations about any matter affecting Wales.
- The Counsel General may bring, defend or appear in legal proceedings, in the name of the Counsel General, if he considers it appropriate to do so to promote or protect the public interest. This is a function the Counsel General exercises independently of government.
- The Counsel General may refer a provision of an Act of Senedd Cymru (including a Welsh Government Bill) to the Supreme Court for a ruling on whether it is within the Senedd's legislative competence, and may respond where any such reference is made by another law officer. This is another function the Counsel General exercises independently of government.
- The Counsel General can also require devolution issues to be referred to the Supreme Court for a decision.
- Like the Welsh Ministers, the First Minister and Senedd members, the Counsel General can introduce a bill into the Senedd.

The Counsel General is accountable to the Senedd for the exercise of his independent statutory functions.They answers questions in the Senedd once every four weeks.

== Other responsibilities ==
- Providing legal advice to the Welsh Government in and representing it in legal proceedings;
- Holding meetings and discussions with other Law Officers;
- Holding meetings and discussions with the judiciary, members of the legal profession and others involved in the administration of justice;
- Responding to proposals or consultations that affect legal matters in Wales, including those of the Law Commission and UK Government;
- Working to improve the accessibility of devolved legislation in Wales for the legal profession and the public, including considering the future consolidation of existing legislation;
- Approving proposed retrospective legislation and early commencement of Senedd Acts.

The Counsel General may also play a role in the development of Welsh Government policy on legal matters. For example, he led with the First Minister in consulting for the public on a separate Welsh legal jurisdiction and preparing the Welsh Government's submissions to the Silk Commission on this issue.

== History of the office ==
From 1998 to October 2003, Winston Roddick fulfilled the role of chief legal adviser to the National Assembly for Wales. This was, however, a civil service post and therefore non-statutory and non-governmental role. Mr Roddick is, however, to be credited with suggesting the title "Counsel General", and as "Counsel General" in that form he had responsibility for advising the National Assembly on all legal matters.

From the coming into force of the 2006 Act a Welsh Assembly Government (now Welsh Government) was created to provide a conventional parliamentary division between legislature and executive, and the statutory and governmental position of Counsel General was created.

== List of Counsels General for Wales ==
| Name | Image | Entered office | Left office | Political party | Government | First Minister |
|---|---|---|---|---|---|---|
| Carwyn Jones AM | | 19 July 2007 | 9 December 2009 | Labour | Fourth Rhodri Morgan government | Rhodri Morgan (2000–2009) |
| John Griffiths AM | | 9 December 2009 | 27 May 2011 | Labour | First Jones government | Carwyn Jones (2009–2018) |
| Theodore Huckle | | 27 May 2011 | 19 May 2016 | Independent | Second Jones government | Carwyn Jones (2009–2018) |
| Mick Antoniw AM | | 27 June 2016 | 14 November 2017 | Labour | Third Jones government | Carwyn Jones (2009–2018) |
| Jeremy Miles MS | | 14 November 2017 | 13 May 2021 | Labour | Third Jones government | Carwyn Jones (2009–2018) |
| Jeremy Miles MS | | 14 November 2017 | 13 May 2021 | Labour | First Drakeford government | Mark Drakeford (2018–2024) |
| Mick Antoniw MS | | 13 May 2021 | 16 July 2024 | Labour | Second Drakeford government | Mark Drakeford (2018–2024) |
| Mick Antoniw MS | | 13 May 2021 | 16 July 2024 | Labour | Gething government | Vaughan Gething (2024) |
| Office Vacant 17 July - 7 August 2024 First Minister Vaughan Gething performing its functions. | | | | Labour | Gething government | Vaughan Gething (2024) |
| Elisabeth Jones | | 7 August 2024 (designate) | 11 September 2024 | Independent | Eluned Morgan government | Eluned Morgan (2024–2026) |
| Julie James MS | | 11 September 2024 | 12 May 2026 | Labour | Eluned Morgan government | Eluned Morgan (2024–2026) |
| Elfyn Llwyd | | 13 May 2026 | Incumbent | Plaid Cymru | ap Iorwerth government | Rhun ap Iorwerth (2026–) |
