= First Jones government =

Welsh government (2009–2011)

- 7th devolved government of Wales
- 2009–2011
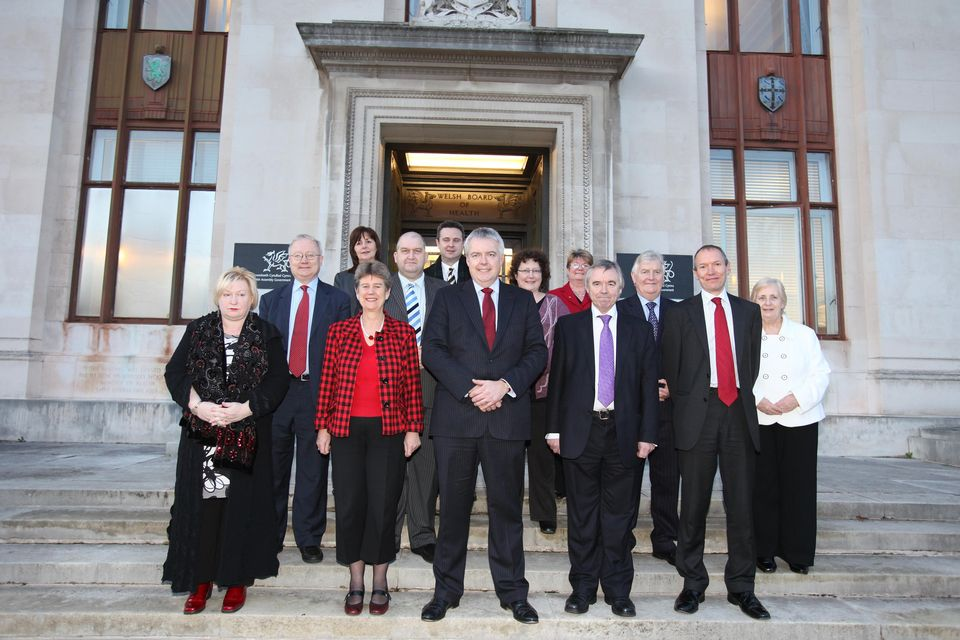
- Jones's first cabinet on 10 December 2009
- Date formed: 10 December 2009
- Date dissolved: 11 May 2011

People and organisations
- Monarch: Elizabeth II
- First Minister: Carwyn Jones
- First Minister's history: 2009–2018
- Deputy First Minister: Ieuan Wyn Jones
- Member parties: Labour; Plaid Cymru
- Status in legislature: Majority (coalition)
- Opposition party: Conservative
- Opposition leader: Nick Bourne

History
- Incoming formation: 2009 Welsh Labour leadership election
- Outgoing election: 2011 National Assembly for Wales election
- Legislature term: 3rd National Assembly for Wales
- Predecessor: Fourth Rhodri Morgan government
- Successor: Second Jones government

The first Jones government (10 December 2009 – 11 May 2011) was a continuation of the previous Labour–Plaid Cymru coalition government in Wales.

Following Rhodri Morgan's decision to retire, a leadership contest was held for the position of Welsh Labour Leader. The election was won by Carwyn Jones who was confirmed leader of Welsh Labour on 1 December 2009 and as First Minister on 9 December 2009 by the Welsh Assembly. Jones was officially sworn in the next day.

Jones maintained the existing One Wales coalition agreement with Plaid Cymru, established by Morgan.

== Cabinet ==
Office	Name	Term	Party
First Minister	Carwyn Jones	2009–2011	Labour
Deputy First Minister Minister for the Economy and Transport	Ieuan Wyn Jones	2009–2011	Plaid Cymru
Minister for Children, Education and Lifelong Learning	Leighton Andrews	2009–2011	Labour
Minister for Environment, Sustainability and Housing	Jane Davidson	2009–2011	Labour
Minister for Business and Budget	Jane Hutt	2009–2011	Labour
Minister for Health and Social Services	Edwina Hart	2009–2011	Labour
Minister for Heritage	Alun Ffred Jones	2009–2011	Plaid Cymru
Minister for Rural Affairs	Elin Jones	2009–2011	Plaid Cymru
Minister for Social Justice and Local Government	Carl Sargeant	2009–2011	Labour
Office holders given special provisions to attend Cabinet
Counsel General for Wales	John Griffiths	2009–2011	Labour
Chief Whip	Janice Gregory	2009–2011	Labour

=== Junior ministers ===
Office	Name	Term	Party
Deputy Minister for Children	Huw Lewis	2009–2011	Labour
Deputy Minister for Housing and Regeneration	Jocelyn Davies	2009–2011	Plaid Cymru
Deputy Minister for Science, Innovation and Skills	Lesley Griffiths	2009–2011	Labour
Deputy Minister for Social Services	Gwenda Thomas	2009–2011	Labour

== See also ==
- Members of the 3rd National Assembly for Wales
