= Third Jones government =

Welsh government (2016–2018)

- 9th devolved government of Wales
- 2016–2018
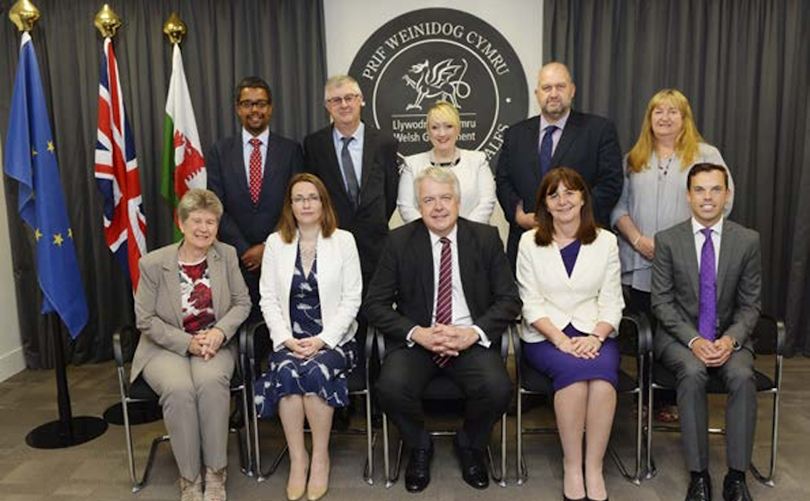
- Jones's third cabinet on 23 May 2016
- Date formed: 19 May 2016
- Date dissolved: 12 December 2018

People and organisations
- Monarch: Elizabeth II
- First Minister: Carwyn Jones
- First Minister's history: 2009–2018
- Member parties: Labour; Liberal Democrats (1); Independent (1)
- Status in legislature: Majority (coalition)
- Opposition party: Plaid Cymru (2016); Conservative (2017–2018)
- Opposition leader: Leanne Wood (2016); Andrew R. T. Davies (2017–2018); Paul Davies (2018)

History
- Outgoing formation: 2018 Welsh Labour leadership election
- Election: 2016 National Assembly for Wales election
- Legislature term: 5th National Assembly for Wales
- Predecessor: Second Jones government
- Successor: First Drakeford government

The third Jones government was a Labour–Liberal Democrat coalition government formed after the 2016 general election in Wales. On 14 October 2016, Dafydd Elis-Thomas left Plaid Cymru in order to support the coalition government and to give them a ruling majority; he later sat as an independent in the Senedd. The government was replaced by the Drakeford government on 13 December 2018, following the resignation of Carwyn Jones as First Minister the previous day.

== Appointment ==
Following a vote in the Assembly to nominate an individual to become First Minister on 11 May 2016 both Jones and Plaid Cymru's Leanne Wood tied on 29 votes each and another vote was automatically scheduled for the following week.

2016 Nomination of First Minister
Date:	11 May 2016
Candidate	Votes
Carwyn Jones (Labour)	29 / 58
Leanne Wood (Note: Later withdrew on 18 May 2016) (Plaid Cymru)	29 / 58
Abstentions	0 / 56
Source: Senedd

Under the Government of Wales Act 2006, if a First Minister is not elected within 28 days of the Assembly elections, those elections would need to be repeated.

Following negotiations with the Plaid Cymru leader, a second vote on 18 May saw Jones re-elected unopposed as First Minister, enabling him to begin the process of forming a minority government. He was sworn in as First Minister on 19 May, after which he said that he was "delighted to introduce the team who will be taking Wales forward over the next five years". Among his appointments was the former Welsh Liberal Democrat leader Kirsty Williams, who became Minister for Education.

== Cabinet ==
Office	Name	Term (in this govt)	Party	Image
First Minister	Rt. Hon Carwyn Jones AM	2016–18	Labour	
Cabinet Secretary for Economy and Infrastructure (2016–17); Cabinet Secretary for Economy and Transport (2017–18)	Ken Skates AM	2016–18	Labour	
Cabinet Secretary for Health, Well-being and Sport (2016–17); Cabinet Secretary for Health and Social Services (2017–18)	Vaughan Gething AM	2016–18	Labour	
Cabinet Secretary for Education	Kirsty Williams AM	2016–18	Liberal Democrats	
Cabinet Secretary for Communities and Children (2016–17); Cabinet Secretary for Local Government and Public Services (2017–18)	Carl Sargeant AM	2016–17	Labour	
Cabinet Secretary for Communities and Children (2016–17); Cabinet Secretary for Local Government and Public Services (2017–18)	Alun Davies AM	2017–18	Labour	
Cabinet Secretary for Finance and Local Government (2016–17); Cabinet Secretary for Finance (2017–18)	Mark Drakeford AM	2016–18	Labour	
Cabinet Secretary for Environment and Rural Affairs (2016–17); Cabinet Secretary for Energy, Planning and Rural Affairs (2017–18)	Lesley Griffiths AM	2016–18	Labour	
Leader of the House and Chief Whip	Jane Hutt AM	2016–17	Labour	
Leader of the House and Chief Whip	Julie James AM	2017–18	Labour	

== Ministers ==
Office	Name	Term	Party	Image
Minister for Skills and Science	Julie James AM	2016–17	Labour	
Minister for Lifelong Learning and Welsh Language	Alun Davies AM	2016–17	Labour	
Minister for Lifelong Learning and Welsh Language	Rt. Hon Eluned Morgan AM	2017–2018	Labour	
Minister for Social Services and Public Health (2016–17); Minister for Children and Social Care (2017–)	Rebecca Evans AM	2016–17	Labour	
Minister for Social Services and Public Health (2016–17); Minister for Children and Social Care (2017–)	Huw Irranca-Davies AM	2017–18	Labour	
Minister for Culture, Tourism and Sport	Rt. Hon Dafydd Elis-Thomas AM	2017–18	Independent	
Minister for Housing and Regeneration	Rebecca Evans AM	2017–18	Labour	
Minister for the Environment	Hannah Blythyn AM	2017–18	Labour	

== Counsel General ==
Name	Term	Party	Image
Mick Antoniw AM	2016–17	Labour	
Jeremy Miles AM	2017–18	Labour	

== See also ==
- Shadow Cabinet (Wales)
- Members of the 5th National Assembly for Wales
