= Sioned Williams =

Deputy First Minister of Wales since 2026

Sioned Williams MS
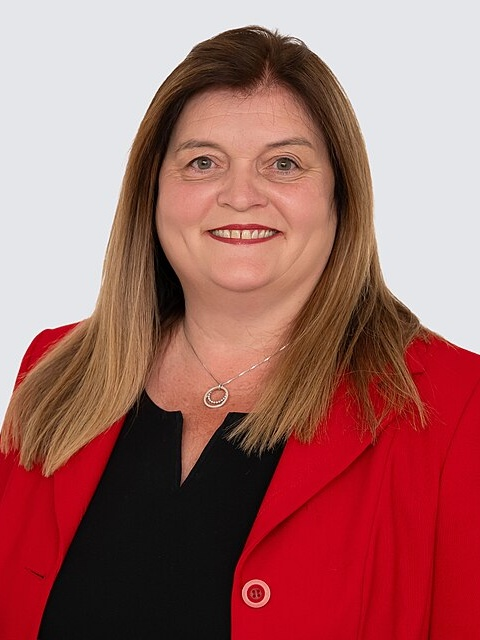
- Official portrait, 2026

Deputy First Minister of Wales
- Incumbent
- Assumed office 13 May 2026
- First Minister: Rhun ap Iorwerth
- Preceded by: Huw Irranca-Davies

Cabinet Minister for Social Justice and Equality
- Incumbent
- Assumed office 13 May 2026
- First Minister: Rhun ap Iorwerth
- Preceded by: Jane Hutt

Member of the Senedd
- Incumbent
- Assumed office 7 May 2021
- Constituency: South Wales West (2021–2026); Brycheiniog Tawe Nedd (2026–)

Personal details
- Born: Sioned Ann Williams; 14 August 1971 (age 55) Cwmbran, Torfaen, Wales
- Party: Plaid Cymru
- Spouse: Daniel Gwydion Williams
- Children: 2
- Education: Aberystwyth University; Cardiff University
- Website: https://www.sionedwilliams.wales/

Sioned Ann Williams (born 14 August 1971) is a Welsh politician who has served as Deputy First Minister of Wales and Cabinet Minister for Social Justice and Equality since 2026. A member of Plaid Cymru, she has been a Member of the Senedd (MS) for Brycheiniog Tawe Nedd, and previously the South Wales West region, since 2021.

== Early life ==
Williams was born in Monmouthshire and was educated at Ysgol Gymraeg Cwmbrân and Ysgol Gyfun Cwm Rhymni. She attended Aberystwyth University where she studied Welsh and English. Later, she attended Cardiff University with a S4C T. Glynne Davies Scholarship.

She was a journalist for BBC News Wales, and later worked at Academi Hywel Teifi in Swansea University, organising public events and community courses on Welsh history, culture and literature.

Williams' great uncle Dai Wil, was an agent for Aneurin Bevan in one of his early elections.

== Political career ==
The majority of Williams' family were Labour Party supporters, other than her mother, who voted Plaid Cymru "to remind them that we're here". Sioned said that the miners' strike, the Campaign for Nuclear Disarmament and the campaign to establish S4C were all "certainly formative features of my youth". A self-proclaimed democratic socialist, she became a member of Plaid because "[she] felt that the Labour lordship of the Gwent Valleys where [she] grew up had become a damaging hegemony, which had lost contact with the culture and people it once represented and defended." Furthermore, Williams believes "the current UK political system does not offer the people of Wales an equitable and prosperous future."

In the 2017 local elections, Williams contested the Alltwen ward on Neath Port Talbot council.

Sioned is the Plaid Cymru spokesperson for Social Justice and Early Years. She is also a member of the Senedd's committee for Equality and Social Justice, and is Chair of four Senedd Cross Party Groups: the Senedd Cross Party Group on Violence against Women and Children; the Senedd Cross Party Group on Human Rights; the Senedd Cross Party Group on Learning Disability and the Senedd Cross Party Group on Consumer Rights.

As of 2021, Sioned was a Community Councillor for Alltwen and Chair of Cilybebyll Community Council. She previously served as Chair of Governors of Ysgol Gynradd Gymraeg Pontardawe for five years, and then became governor of Ysgol Gymraeg Ystalyfera Bro Dur.

She has also worked for Plaid Cymru as head of strategic communications.

Sioned has campaigned passionately on many matters of social justice and inequality since her election. Notably, she successfully helped to secure a reopening of the enquiry into the Gleision Colliery mining accident in Cilybebyll after campaigning alongside the victims’ families for several years.

In the 2026 Senedd election, she was elected as a MS for the Brycheiniog Tawe Nedd constituency. She was later appointed Deputy First Minister and Cabinet Secretary for Social Justice in the ap Iorwerth government.

== Personal life ==
Sioned's husband, Daniel Gwydion Williams, is a professor of English Literature at Swansea University; he is also a writer and a semi-professional jazz musician. The couple live in Alltwen, Swansea Valley with their two teenage children.
