= Cabinet Minister for Health and Care =

Welsh Government cabinet minister

Cabinet Minister for Health and Care of Wales

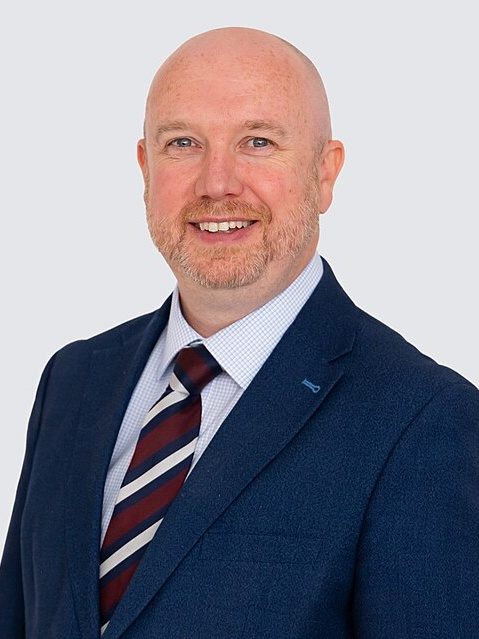
- Incumbent; Mabon ap Gwynfor MS since 13 May 2026
- Welsh Government; Department of Health and Social Services
- Style: Welsh Minister
- Status: Cabinet Minister
- Abbreviation: Health Secretary
- Member of: the Senedd; Cabinet
- Reports to: the Senedd and the First Minister of Wales
- Seat: Cardiff
- Nominator: First Minister of Wales
- Appointer: The Crown
- Term length: Four years; Subject to elections to the Senedd which take place every four years
- Formation: 12 May 1999
- First holder: Jane Hutt AM
- Salary: £105,701 per annum

The Cabinet Minister for Health and Care is a cabinet position in the Welsh Government, currently held by Mabon ap Gwynfor since May 2026.

The minister is responsible for the running of the National Health Service in Wales, all aspects of public health and health protection in Wales, the Food Standards Agency in Wales, post-graduate medical education and any charges for NHS services.

The position was briefly titled as Cabinet Secretary for Health, Well-being and Sport from 2016 to 2018. Under the Government of the 5th Assembly (2018) the position was renamed to its previous name.

== Ministers ==
Name	Picture	Entered office	Left office	Political party	Government
Minister for Health and Social Services
Jane Hutt AM		12 May 1999	10 September 2005	Labour	Michael; Interim Rhodri Morgan; First Rhodri Morgan; Second Rhodri Morgan
Brian Gibbons AM		10 September 2005	25 May 2007	Labour	Second Rhodri Morgan
Edwina Hart AM		25 May 2007	11 May 2011	Labour	Fourth Rhodri Morgan; First Jones
Lesley Griffiths AM		11 May 2011	14 March 2013	Labour	Second Jones
Mark Drakeford AM		14 March 2013	19 May 2016	Labour	Second Jones
Cabinet Secretary for Health, Well-being and Sport
Vaughan Gething AM		19 May 2016	13 December 2018	Labour Co-op	Third Jones
Minister for Health and Social Services
Vaughan Gething MS		13 December 2018	13 May 2021	Labour Co-op	First Drakeford
Eluned Morgan MS		13 May 2021	21 March 2024	Labour	Second Drakeford
Cabinet Secretary for Health and Social Care
Eluned Morgan MS		24 March 2024	6 August 2024	Labour	Gething
Mark Drakeford MS		7 August 2024	11 September 2024	Labour	Eluned Morgan
Jeremy Miles MS		11 September 2024	12 May 2026	Labour Co-op	Eluned Morgan
Cabinet Minister for Health and Care
Mabon ap Gwynfor		13 May 2026	Incumbent	Plaid Cymru	ap Iorwerth

== See also ==
- Healthcare in Wales
- NHS Wales
- Food Standards Agency
- Public Health Wales
