= Deputy First Minister of Wales =

Deputy leader of the Welsh Government

- Dirprwy Brif Weinidog Cymru (Welsh)

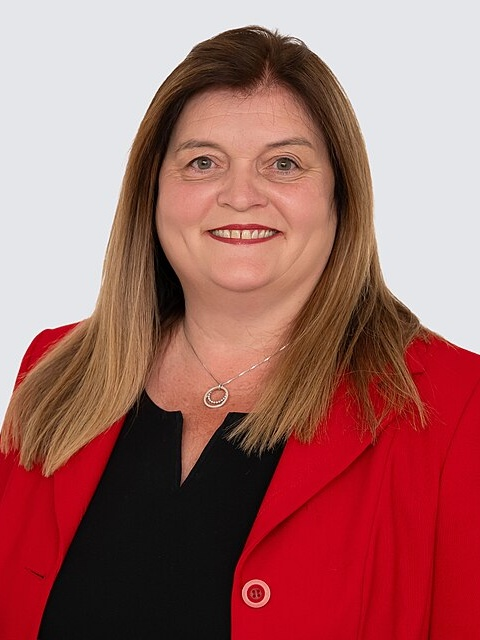
- Incumbent; Sioned Williams since 13 May 2026
- Inaugural holder: Mike German
- Formation: 16 October 2000
- Website: https://www.gov.wales/sioned-williams-ms

The deputy first minister of Wales (Welsh: dirprwy brif weinidog Cymru) is the deputy leader of the Welsh Government. The post was created in October 2000 when Mike German of the Welsh Liberal Democrats was appointed Deputy First Minister as part of a coalition government with Welsh Labour. The current deputy first minister is Sioned Williams of Plaid Cymru, who has served as part of the Ap Iorwerth government since 2026.

Since the office was created, the holder has traditionally been the party leader of the junior partner in coalition with Welsh Labour, though this changed in 2024 with the appointment of Labour's Huw Irranca-Davies in the Labour government of Eluned Morgan. During the July 2024 Welsh Labour leadership election, Eluned Morgan stated that she was running on a joint ticket, with the role of Deputy First Minister to be resurrected under her government, and the position to be granted to Huw Irranca-Davies. This would mark the first time that a Deputy First Member was not the member of a junior partner in a coalition, and the first time that it would be held by a member of Welsh Labour. Morgan confirmed Irranca-Davies as deputy in her government on 6 August 2024.

== List of Deputy First Ministers ==
Name	Political party	Term of office			Other office held	First Minister	Government
Name	Political party	Start	End	Duration	Other office held	First Minister	Government
Mike German; AM for South Wales East (born 1945)	Liberal Democrats	16 October 2000	6 July 2001	263 days	Minister for Economic Development	Rhodri Morgan (Labour)	Rh. Morgan I Labour – Liberal Democrats
Jenny Randerson; AM for Cardiff Central (1948–2025) Acting	Liberal Democrats	6 July 2001	13 June 2002	342 days	Minister for Culture, Sport and the Welsh Language	Rhodri Morgan (Labour)	Rh. Morgan I Labour – Liberal Democrats
Mike German; AM for South Wales East (born 1945)	Liberal Democrats	13 June 2002	8 May 2003	329 days	Minister for Rural Affairs and Wales Abroad	Rhodri Morgan (Labour)	Rh. Morgan I Labour – Liberal Democrats
Office not in use 8 May 2003 – 11 July 2007
Ieuan Wyn Jones; AM for Ynys Môn (born 1949)	Plaid Cymru	11 July 2007	13 May 2011	3 years, 306 days	Minister for the Economy and Transport	Rhodri Morgan (Labour)	Rh. Morgan IV; Labour – Plaid Cymru
Ieuan Wyn Jones; AM for Ynys Môn (born 1949)	Plaid Cymru	11 July 2007	13 May 2011	3 years, 306 days	Minister for the Economy and Transport	Carwyn Jones (Labour)	Jones I Labour – Plaid Cymru
Office not in use 13 May 2011 – 6 August 2024
Huw Irranca-Davies; MS for Ogmore (born 1963)	Labour	6 August 2024	12 May 2026	1 year, 279 days	Cabinet Secretary for Climate Change and Rural Affairs	Eluned Morgan (Labour)	E. Morgan; Labour (minority)
Sioned Williams; MS for Brycheiniog Tawe Nedd (born 1971)	Plaid Cymru	13 May 2026	Incumbent	117 days	Cabinet Minister for Social Justice and Equality	Rhun ap Iorwerth (Plaid Cymru)	ap Iorwerth; Plaid Cymru (minority)

== See also ==
- First Minister of Wales
