= Julie James (politician) =

Welsh politician (born 1958)

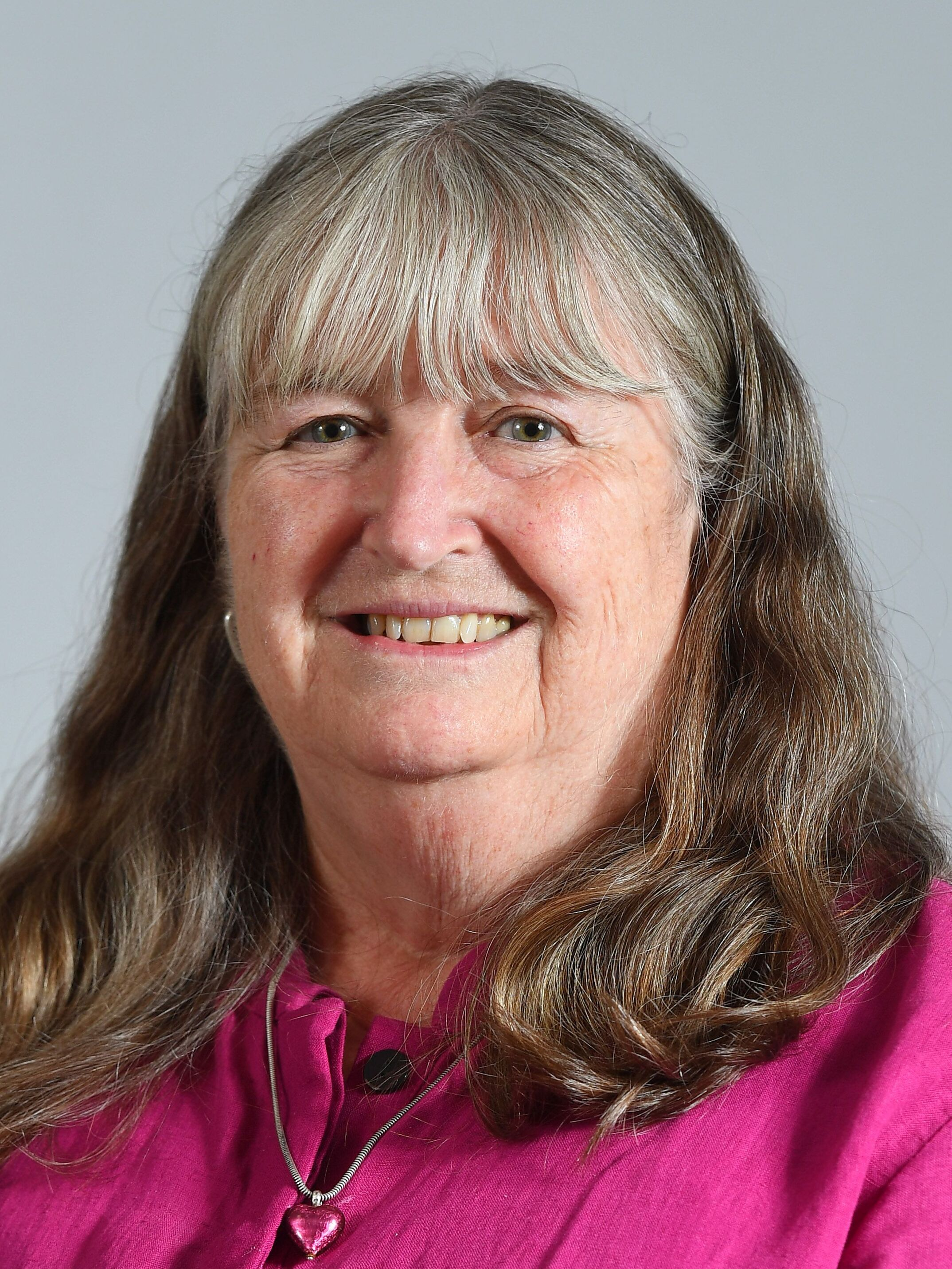
- Official portrait, 2024

Counsel General for Wales and Minister for Delivery
- In office 11 September 2024 – 12 May 2026
- First Minister: Eluned Morgan
- Preceded by: Elisabeth Jones (Designate); Office established (Delivery)
- Succeeded by: Elfyn Llwyd; Office abolished (Delivery)

Cabinet Secretary for Housing, Local Government, and Planning (Note: As Minister for Housing and Local Government from 2018 to 2021)
- In office 21 March 2024 – 16 July 2024
- First Minister: Vaughan Gething
- Preceded by: Rebecca Evans
- Succeeded by: Jayne Bryant
- In office 13 December 2018 – 13 May 2021
- First Minister: Mark Drakeford
- Preceded by: Alun Davies
- Succeeded by: Rebecca Evans

Minister for Climate Change
- In office 13 May 2021 – 20 March 2024
- First Minister: Mark Drakeford
- Preceded by: Office established
- Succeeded by: Huw Irranca-Davies

Leader of the House Chief Government Whip
- In office 3 November 2017 – 13 December 2018
- First Minister: Carwyn Jones
- Preceded by: Jane Hutt
- Succeeded by: Jane Hutt & Rebecca Evans

Deputy Minister for Skills and Technology
- In office 11 September 2014 – 3 November 2017
- First Minister: Carwyn Jones
- Preceded by: Ken Skates
- Succeeded by: Lee Waters

Member of the Senedd for Swansea West
- In office 6 May 2011 – 7 April 2026
- Preceded by: Andrew Davies
- Majority: 6,521 (27.2%)

Personal details
- Born: 25 February 1958 (age 68) Swansea, Wales
- Party: Labour
- Spouse: David
- Children: 3
- Relatives: Richard David James (brother)
- Education: University of Sussex; Polytechnic of Central London; Inns of Court
- Profession: Barrister, Civil Servant, Politician
- Website: Campaign Website

Julie James (born February 1958) is a Welsh Labour politician who served as Counsel General and Minister for Delivery from September 2024 to May 2026. She was the Member of the Senedd (MS) for Swansea West from 2011 to 2026, and has served in the Welsh Government in various roles since 2018.

== Early life ==
James was born in Swansea, and was raised in various places around the world with her family. Her parents had married young, and they did not have more children until she was 8. Her sister, 8 years younger, lives in Swansea and her brother, 13 years younger, is musician Richard D. James. At the age of sixteen she joined the Labour Party and was the first of her family to study at university.

== Professional career ==
James first studied American Studies & History at University of Sussex, graduating in 1980. She then studied law at the Polytechnic of Central London, graduating in 1982, then went on to the Inns of Court School of Law in London to train as a barrister, passing the bar in 1983.

Her career started working as a policy lawyer with the London Borough of Camden. She then moved back to Swansea to raise her three children and start work for West Glamorgan County Council as the Assistant County Secretary (Legal Services).

James later worked for the City and County of Swansea Council, where her final post was Assistant Chief Executive (Governance). She left of her own accord at the signing of a contract by the Liberal Democrats which she 'thought' to have wasted "millions of pounds". She went on to join the law practice Clarkslegal LLP, specialising in environmental and constitutional law.

== Political career ==
On 5 May 2011, James was elected as Assembly Member representing Swansea West.

Julie James sat on several committees, including the Constitutional and Legislative Affairs Committee, Enterprise and Business Committee and Environment and Sustainability Committee. She has chaired the procurement and common fisheries task and finish groups.

On 11 September 2014, she was appointed Deputy Minister for Skills and Technology during a reshuffle by Carwyn Jones, replacing Ken Skates who was appointed Deputy Minister for Culture, Sport and Tourism.

On 5 May 2016, James was re-elected as the Assembly Member for Swansea West by a higher majority than her previous term and was tipped at the time to be a likely candidate for a cabinet position.

On 3 November 2017, she was promoted to the Cabinet as Leader of the House & Chief Whip.

On 13 December 2018, following the election of Mark Drakeford to the position of leader of Welsh Labour and therefore First Minister, James was appointed Minister for Housing and Local Government.

After the election of Vaughan Gething to the leader of Welsh Labour and subsequently First Minister Julie James was appointed Cabinet Secretary for Housing Local Government & Planning. She resigned as Cabinet Secretary on 16 July 2024, to call for Gething's resignation. She supported Eluned Morgan to replace Gething.

On 11 September 2024, James was appointed as Counsel General-designate for Wales and Minister for Delivery by First Minister Eluned Morgan, Gething's successor. She became Counsel General for Wales formally on appointment by the Senedd on 17 September 2024.

James did not seek re-election at the 2026 Senedd election.

== Ending homelessness Action Plan ==
Julie James set out the Welsh Government's plans for legislative reform to ensure people's time without a home is "rare, brief and unrepeated" in 2017.

The plan has been described as 'world leading'. The Welsh Government introduced a White Paper outlining significant reforms to its homelessness legislation, with the goal of making homelessness a rare, brief, and non-recurring event. Wales pioneered the creation of a statutory prevention duty, mandating local authorities to help individuals at risk of losing their homes. The new proposals suggest abolishing the 'priority need' and 'intentional homelessness' tests, extending the period for being 'threatened with homelessness' to six months, and imposing new responsibilities on agencies such as the NHS and social services to address homelessness risks. These changes are based on recommendations from an Expert Review Panel organized by Crisis. Despite the need for substantial initial investment, these reforms are anticipated to yield long-term savings. While most recommendations from the Panel have been adopted, some, like the obligations for private landlords and schools, are still under review. A Bill is expected within the current Senedd term, with Wales and Scotland continuing to share insights as both pursue advancements in homelessness prevention.

== Craig Yr Hesg Quarry Appeal Controversy ==
Julie James approved an appeal by Hanson Quarries (now Heidelberg Cement UK) to overturn the decision by Rhondda-Cynon-Taf to deny an extension to Craig yr Hesg Quarry(CHQ) - which was due to cease operations in December 2022.

The appeal was approved due to the recommendations of an inspector who noted the significant national importance of the CHQ aggregate, recognized as one of the highest quality sources of skid-resistant surface aggregate in the UK. The Inspector highlighted the national need for this mineral, which he said weighed heavily in favour of the appeal. Compliance with local and national planning requirements was also a crucial factor. The Rhondda Cynon Taff Local Development Plan and Planning Policy Wales mandated a minimum 10-year landbank of rock aggregate reserves & the Regional Technical Statements for North and South Wales further required a minimum allocation of 9.295 million tonnes of new crushed rock reserves, also supporting the appeal according to the inspector.

Despite considerable local opposition, the Inspector determined that the application must be evaluated based on its planning merits. The Inspector acknowledged some limited harm to local amenity due to operational noise and air quality impacts during construction, but proposed conditions were deemed sufficient to mitigate these impacts to acceptable levels. Additionally, according to the report the development would not cause significant harm to the landscape character, appearance, road safety, or from blasting and vibration.

The report also stated that the development would also enhance biodiversity, improve access to the countryside, and provide Public Rights of Way, adding further justification for allowing the appeal, according to an FOI request made of the Welsh Government. This is likely due to the appeal including the implementation of a comprehensive restoration scheme for the site to "establish amenity grassland, woodland and nature conservation uses".

Local protests began at the site when contractors, acting on behalf of Heidelberg Cement UK began removing trees and erecting fences.

== Offices held ==
Senedd
Preceded by Andrew Davies	Member of the Senedd for Swansea West; 2011–2026	Succeeded by Seat abolished
Political offices
Preceded by Ken Skates	Deputy Minister for Skills and Technology; 2014–2017	Succeeded by Lee Waters
Preceded by Alun Davies as Cabinet Secretary for Local Government and Public Services	Minister for Housing and Local Government; 13 December 2018 – present	Incumbent
