= Rebecca Evans (politician) =

Welsh politician (born 1976)

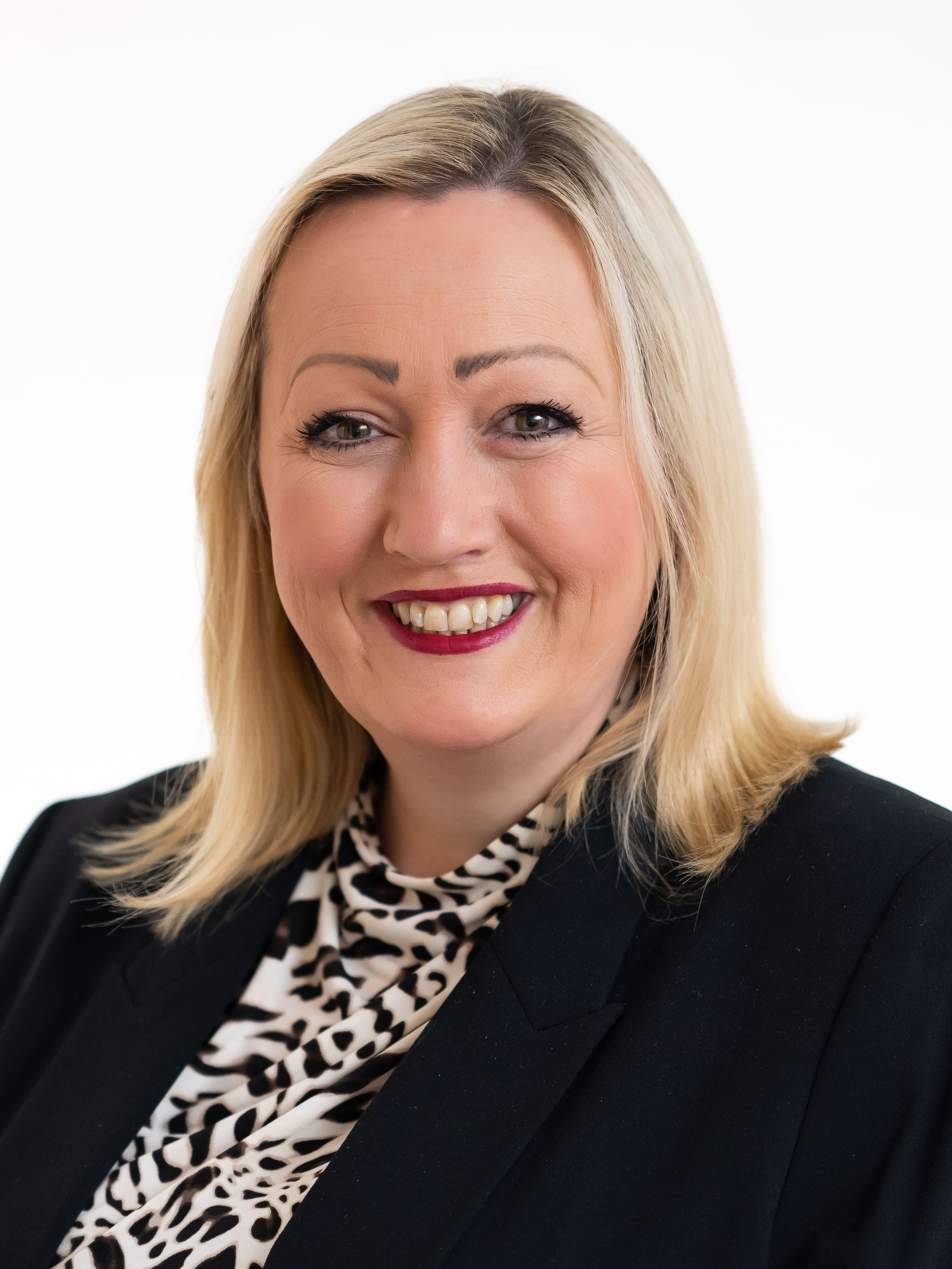
- Official portrait, 2024

Cabinet Secretary for Economy, Energy and Planning
- In office 11 September 2024 – 12 May 2026
- First Minister: Eluned Morgan
- Preceded by: Ken Skates
- Succeeded by: Adam Price

Cabinet Secretary for Finance, Constitution and Cabinet Office (Note: As Minister for Finance until 20 March 2024 when she assumed responsibilities for the Constitution from Mick Antoniw and was given the additional portfolio of the Cabinet Office)
- In office 13 December 2018 – 11 September 2024
- First Minister: Mark Drakeford; Vaughan Gething; Eluned Morgan
- Preceded by: Mark Drakeford
- Succeeded by: Mark Drakeford

Minister for Local Government
- In office 13 May 2021 – 20 March 2024
- First Minister: Mark Drakeford
- Preceded by: Julie James
- Succeeded by: Julie James

Trefnydd of the Senedd
- In office 13 December 2018 – 13 May 2021
- First Minister: Mark Drakeford
- Preceded by: Julie James
- Succeeded by: Lesley Griffiths

Minister for Housing and Regeneration
- In office 3 November 2017 – 13 December 2018
- First Minister: Carwyn Jones
- Preceded by: Office established
- Succeeded by: Hannah Blythyn

Minister for Social Services and Public Health
- In office 19 May 2016 – 3 November 2017
- First Minister: Carwyn Jones
- Preceded by: Office established
- Succeeded by: Huw Irranca-Davies (Children and Social Care)

Deputy Minister for Farming and Food
- In office 8 July 2014 – 19 May 2016
- First Minister: Carwyn Jones
- Preceded by: Alun Davies (Agriculture)
- Succeeded by: Hannah Blythyn (Minister for the Environment)

Member of the Senedd for Gower
- In office 6 May 2016 – 7 April 2026
- Preceded by: Edwina Hart
- Majority: 4,795 (14.4%)

Member of the Senedd for Mid and West Wales
- In office 5 May 2011 – 6 May 2016
- Preceded by: Alun Davies
- Succeeded by: Eluned Morgan

Personal details
- Born: 2 August 1976 (age 50) Bridgend, Wales
- Party: Welsh Labour and Co-operative
- Education: Sidney Sussex College, Cambridge; University of Leeds

Rebecca Mary Evans (born 2 August 1976) is a Welsh Labour and Co-operative politician who served as Cabinet Secretary for the Economy, Energy and Planning from 2024 to 2026. She previously served as Cabinet Secretary for Finance from 2018 to 2024, and for the Constitution and Cabinet Office in 2024. Evans served as the Member of the Senedd (MS) for Gower from 2016 to 2026, and a Member for Mid and West Wales from 2011 to 2016.

Evans has previously served in other roles in the Welsh Government, such as the Deputy Minister for Farming and Food (2014–16), Minister for Social Care and Public Health (2016–17) and Minister for Housing and Regeneration (2017–18). She was Trefnydd (Leader) of the Senedd from 2018 to 2021.

== Early life and career ==
Evans was born in Bridgend, Wales in 1976. She obtained a BA degree in history at the University of Leeds, and an MPhil in Historical Studies at Sidney Sussex College, Cambridge.

She worked as Policy and Public Affairs Officer for a national charity representing disabled people and their families. Evans is also a former Welsh Labour Organiser for Mid and West Wales, and a former Senior Researcher and Communications Officer for an Assembly Member.

== Member of the Senedd ==
Evans was elected in 2011 as one of four regional MSs representing Mid and West Wales in the Senedd for Labour. At the 2016 election, she was elected as the Labour Co-operative member for the Gower constituency and was re-elected in 2021.

Between her election in 2011 and her promotion to ministerial office, Evans served on the National Assembly for Wales' Environment and Sustainable Development Committee and its Common Agricultural Policy Task and Finish Group, the Heath and Social Care Committee, and the Children, Young People and Education Committee. She has also served as chair of the Cross-party group on Nursing and midwifery, the cross-party group on mental health and was the co-chair of the cross-party group on disability.

On 8 July 2014, Evans joined the Welsh Government as the Deputy Minister for Agriculture and Fisheries, in a minor reshuffle following the sacking of Alun Davies. The office was renamed to Deputy Minister for Farming and Food in September 2014.

Following the 2016 Assembly election, she was appointed to the new role of Minister for Social Care and Public Health. She moved to another new role as Minister for Housing and Regeneration in a reshuffle on 3 November 2017.

In December 2018, Evans joined Mark Drakeford's first Cabinet as the Minister for Finance and Trefnydd (Leader) of the Senedd.

Evans introduced and was the government minister responsible for the Welsh Tax Acts etc. (Power to Modify) Act 2022 which allowed the Welsh government to amend tax law using statutory instruments.

Evans stood down at the 2026 Senedd election.

== Notes ==
Senedd
Preceded by Alun Davies	Member of the Senedd for Mid and West Wales; 2011–2016	Succeeded by Eluned Morgan
Preceded by Edwina Hart	Member of the Senedd for Gower; 2016–2026	Succeeded by Constituency abolished
Political offices
Preceded by Mark Drakeford	Minister for Finance; 2018–present	Incumbent
Preceded by Julie James	Trefnydd of the Senedd; 2018–present	Incumbent
