= Huw Lewis =

British politician (born 1964)

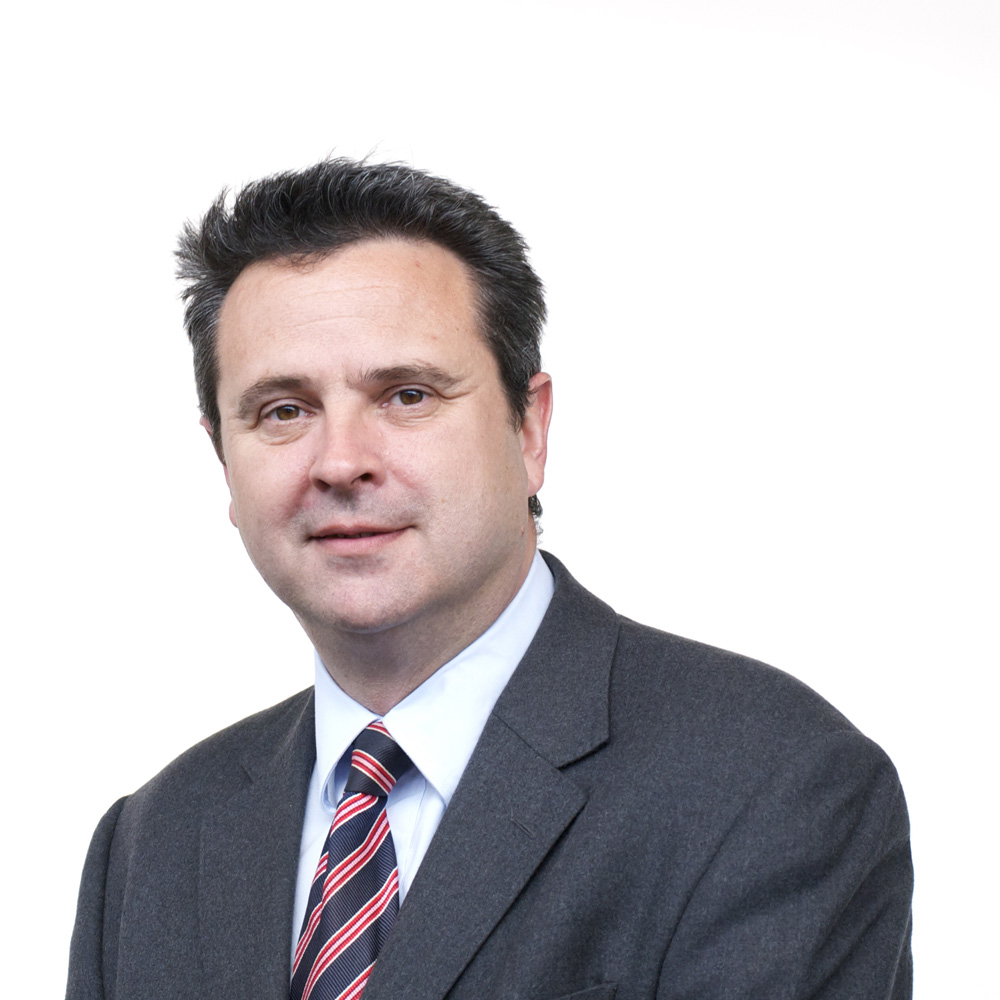

Member of the Welsh Assembly for Merthyr Tydfil and Rhymney
- In office 6 May 1999 – 6 April 2016
- Preceded by: Office created
- Succeeded by: Dawn Bowden

Minister for Education and Skills
- In office 26 June 2013 – 7 May 2016
- First Minister: Carwyn Jones
- Deputy: Ken Skates
- Preceded by: Leighton Andrews
- Succeeded by: Kirsty Williams

Minister for Communities and Tackling Poverty
- In office 14 March 2013 – 26 June 2013
- First Minister: Carwyn Jones
- Preceded by: Position established
- Succeeded by: Jeff Cuthbert

Minister for Housing, Regeneration & Heritage
- In office 2011–2013
- First Minister: Carwyn Jones

Deputy Minister for Children
- In office 2009–2011
- First Minister: Rhodri Morgan; Carwyn Jones

Deputy Minister for Economy & Transport
- In office 31 May 2007 – 18 July 2007
- First Minister: Rhodri Morgan

Deputy Minister for Social Justice & Regeneration
- In office May 2003 – 31 May 2007
- First Minister: Rhodri Morgan

Deputy Minister for Education and Lifelong Learning
- In office October 2000 – 16 April 2001
- First Minister: Rhodri Morgan

Government Whip
- In office May 1999 – October 2000
- First Minister: Alun Michael
- Preceded by: Post established

Personal details
- Born: 17 January 1964 (age 62) Merthyr Tydfil, Wales
- Party: Labour Co-operative
- Spouse: Lynne Neagle
- Education: University of Edinburgh
- Occupation: Teacher, political advisor
- Website: Welsh Labour

Huw Lewis (born 17 January 1964) is a Welsh Labour Co-operative politician who served as Minister for Education and Skills from 2013 to 2016. Born in Merthyr Tydfil, Glamorgan, Lewis represented the Merthyr Tydfil and Rhymney constituency in the National Assembly for Wales from 1999 to 2016.

== Early life ==
Born in Merthyr Tydfil and brought up in Aberfan, he attended the University of Edinburgh. Active in the local Scottish Labour Party, he worked for both Labour Party leader John Smith and later Donald Dewar. Lewis campaigned for a Scottish Assembly alongside Edinburgh Labour Club colleagues Douglas and Wendy Alexander, and Pat McFadden.

Returning to South Wales, Lewis worked briefly as a chemistry teacher at Afon Taf High School, before working full-time for the Labour Party.

== Political career ==
Elected to the position of Assistant General Secretary of Welsh Labour, he organised the campaign for the Labour "Yes" Vote campaign in 1997, that lead to the creation of the Welsh National Assembly.

Elected to the National Assembly for Wales in 1999 as a Labour and Co-operative Party candidate to represent Merthyr Tydfil and Rhymney. He has been party Whip in the Assembly, a post he resigned following the resignation of Alun Michael as First Secretary. He has also been Deputy Minister for Education and Lifelong Learning in October 2000, a post he resigned following the use of a landfill site in Trecatti, within his constituency, for the disposal of carcasses during the foot and mouth crisis (16 April 2001). He was the first Welsh Minister forced to resign due to breach of convention, in this case the convention of collective ministerial responsibility.

He was re-elected in 2003 and was appointed Deputy Minister for Social Justice and Regeneration in May 2003. In the Third Assembly he was appointed Deputy Minister for the Economy and Transport on 31 May 2007 but announced to the media that due to his private opposition to One Wales coalition deal with Plaid Cymru he had been sacked on 18 July 2007, having been the only one of Labour's then 26 AMs to vote against Labour's coalition with Plaid Cymru.

On 26 June 2013 in light of the resignation of Leighton Andrews, Lewis was appointed Minister for Education and Skills. Not being a Welsh language speaker, that brief was returned to First Minister Carwyn Jones.

In January 2016, Lewis announced that he would leave the Assembly at the election in May of that year.

== Personal life ==
Lewis is married to his second wife Lynne Neagle, the Labour Senedd member for Torfaen and they have a son.

In August 2021 Lewis was appointed as the Political and Membership Officer for Wales at the Co-operative Party

== Offices held ==
Senedd
Preceded by (new post)	Assembly Member for Merthyr Tydfil and Rhymney; 1999–2016	Succeeded by Dawn Bowden
Political offices
Preceded by (new post)	Deputy Minister for Education and Lifelong Learning; 2000 - 2003	Succeeded by (post reorganised)
Preceded by (new post)	Deputy Minister for Social Justice and Regeneration; 2005 - 2007	Succeeded by (post reorganised)
Preceded by Brian Gibbons	Deputy Minister for Economy and Transport; 2007	Succeeded by (post reorganised)
Preceded by (new post)	Deputy Minister for Children; 2009 - 2011	Succeeded by Leighton Andrews
Preceded by (new post)	Minister for Housing, Regeneration & Heritage; 2011 - 2013	Succeeded by (post reorganised)
Preceded by Leighton Andrews	Minister for Education and Skills; 2013 - 2016	Succeeded by Kirsty Williams
