= Andrew Davies (Labour politician) =

Welsh politician (born 1952)

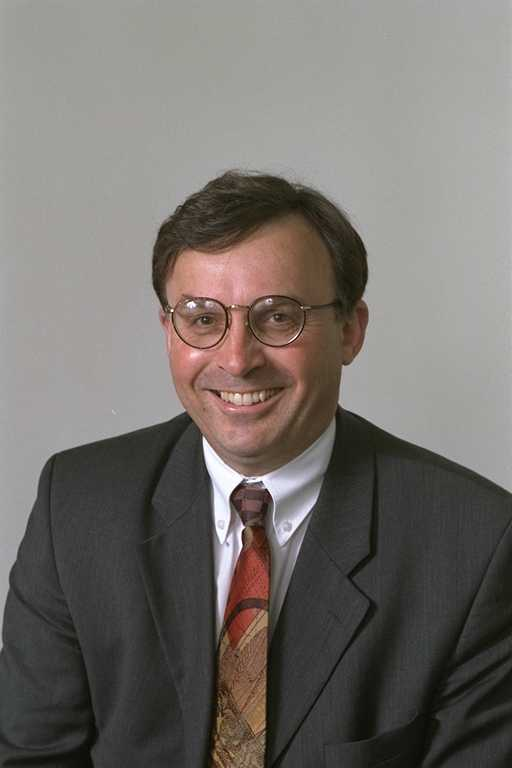
- Official portrait, 1999

Member of the Welsh Assembly for Swansea West
- In office 6 May 1999 – 6 May 2011
- Preceded by: New Assembly
- Succeeded by: Julie James

Personal details
- Born: 5 May 1952 (age 74) Hereford, England
- Party: Labour
- Education: Swansea University

Andrew David Davies (born 5 May 1952) is a Welsh politician who represented the constituency of Swansea West in the National Assembly for Wales from 1999 to 2011. He is a member of Welsh Labour.

Davies was born in Hereford to Welsh parents; his mother is from Llandeilo and his father from Holywell, Flintshire. Davies attended Hereford Cathedral School and Swansea University, where he trained as a teacher.

== Political career ==
Former Chair of Swansea West Labour Party and member of the Welsh Labour Executive Committee, he was a regional party official from 1984 to 1991. Davies was one of the architects of devolution as main organiser of the Labour Party Yes Campaign in 1997. He has served as a member of the Welsh Assembly Government for the first ten years of devolution serving under both Alun Michael and Rhodri Morgan.

From May 1999 to February 2002, he served as Business Manager with a place on the Business Committee. During the period of Labour minority government (May 1999-October 2000), he also served as chief whip of the Labour group, but Standing Orders of the Labour Group prohibited him holding this post during a coalition period.

In February 2002, promotion followed the "tweak" by Rhodri Morgan to his Cabinet when, with Mike German AM still outside Government, Andrew Davies was promoted to Minister for Economic Development. It is arguably the second most senior position in Cabinet and was seen as a reward for loyalty and for managing Assembly business.

In the May 2003 reshuffle he also gained responsibility for transport policy. He helped the Assembly's policy of extending broadband connectivity throughout Wales to progress. From 2000 he has also had personal responsibility for co-ordination of information technology in public institutions, and has sought to advance Wales's IT abilities on a European level.

In May 2007 Davies became Minister for Social Justice and Public Service Delivery in the Labour led minority government. In the coalition government of Labour and Plaid Cymru, Davies was appointed Minister for Finance and Public Service Delivery on 19 July.

He left the cabinet following the Welsh Labour leadership election in 2009 and stood down as an Assembly Member at the 2011 election.

He later became Chairman of Abertawe Bro Morgannwg University Health Board in South Wales from 2013 until 2019.

== Personal life ==
In 2024 Davies revealed that he had been diagnosed as autistic at the age of 70.

Senedd
Preceded by (new post)	Assembly Member for Swansea West	Succeeded by Julie James
Political offices
Preceded by (new post)	Chief Whip; 1999–2000	Succeeded by Karen Sinclair
Preceded by (new post)	Minister for Assembly Business; 1999–2002	Succeeded by Carwyn Jones
Preceded by (new post)	Minister for Enterprise, Innovation and Networks; 2002–2007	Succeeded by Brian Gibbons
Preceded by (new post)	Minister for Social Justice and Public Service Delivery; 2007 (31 May – 19 July)	Succeeded by (post reorganised)
Preceded by (new post)	Minister for Finance and Public Service Delivery; 2007–2009	Succeeded by (post reorganised)
