= Cabinet Secretary for Housing =

Cabinet Secretary for Housing may refer to

- Cabinet Secretary for Housing (Scotland), a Scottish government position
- Cabinet Secretary for Housing (Wales), a Welsh government position
