= Cabinet Minister for Finance =

Welsh Government cabinet minister

- Gweinidog Cabinet dros Gyllid (Welsh)
- Flag of Wales

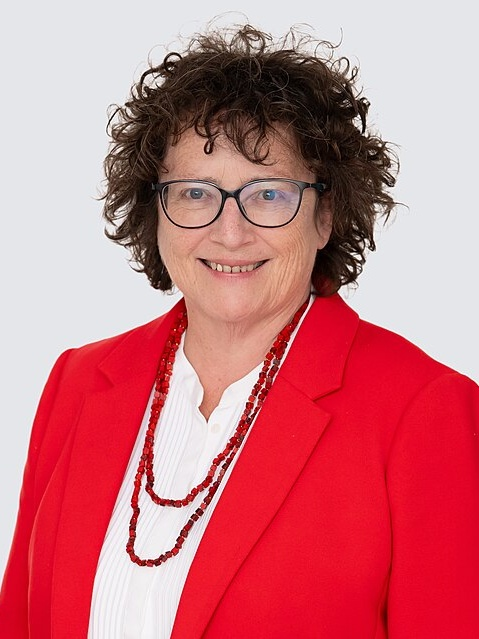
- Incumbent; Elin Jones since 13 May 2026
- Welsh Government; Senedd
- Style: Welsh Minister
- Status: Cabinet Minister
- Member of: the Senedd; Cabinet
- Reports to: The First Minister
- Appointer: The Crown
- Formation: 1999
- First holder: Edwina Hart AM
- Salary: £124,713 (MS pay + £44,896 Welsh Minister pay)
- Website: www.gov.wales/elin-jones-ms

The Cabinet Minister for Finance (Welsh: Gweinidog Cabinet dros Gyllid) is a member of the cabinet in the Welsh Government, responsible for the management of the budget, tax and borrowing, oversight of financial accounting and audit, and oversight of any Private Finance Initiative, amongst others. The current officeholder is Elin Jones since May 2026.

== List of ministers ==
Name	Portrait	Term of office	Party	Title	First Minister
Edwina Hart		1999 – 2003	Welsh Labour	Secretary for Finance	Alun Michael
Edwina Hart		1999 – 2003	Welsh Labour	Secretary for Finance	Rhodri Morgan
Sue Essex		2003 – 3 May 2007	Welsh Labour	Minister for Finance and Local Government	Rhodri Morgan
Jane Hutt		25 May 2007 – 19 July 2007	Welsh Labour	Minister for Budget and Business Management	Rhodri Morgan
Andrew Davies		19 July 2007 – 9 December 2009	Welsh Labour	Minister for Finance and Public Service Delivery	Rhodri Morgan
Jane Hutt		9 December 2009 – May 2016	Welsh Labour	Minister for Business and Budget (2009–11) Minister for Finance (2011–16)	Carwyn Jones
Mark Drakeford		19 May 2016 – 13 December 2018	Welsh Labour	Cabinet Secretary for Finance	Carwyn Jones
Rebecca Evans		13 December 2018 – 11 September 2024	Welsh Labour	Minister for Finance; Cabinet Secretary for Finance	Mark Drakeford
Rebecca Evans		13 December 2018 – 11 September 2024	Welsh Labour	Cabinet Secretary for Finance	Vaughan Gething
Mark Drakeford		11 September 2024 – 12 May 2026	Welsh Labour	Cabinet Secretary for Finance and Welsh Language	Eluned Morgan
Elin Jones		13 May 2026 – Present	Plaid Cymru	Cabinet Minister for Finance	Rhun ap Iorwerth (government)

== Responsibilities ==
These are the current responsibilities of the Finance post:

- The Welsh Treasury
- The Welsh Revenue Authority
- Provision of strategic direction and management of the resources of the Welsh Government
- Taxation policy including Council Tax Reform, non-domestic rates, council tax reduction and the Sponsorship of the Valuation Office Agency services and the Valuation Tribunal for Wales
- Local Government finance policy including financial reform
- Visitor Levy
- Budget monitoring and management
- Strategic Investment
- Invest to Save
- Financial Accounting and audit
- In-year budget monitoring and management
- Operation and development of the devolved funding settlement and the Statement of Funding policy
- Relationship with HM Treasury and HM Revenue and Customs on all spending and tax matters
- Public Sector pay policy
- The strategic approach to the acquisition, maintenance and disposal of property and other assets
- Commercial and procurement matters for the Welsh public service
- Grants policy
- Co-ordination of work on the Common Frameworks
- Oversight of audit, inspection and regulation as they relate to public services
