= Deputy Minister for Skills and Tertiary Education =

Welsh Government minister

Deputy Minister for Skills and Tertiary Education of Wales
- Dirprwy Weinidog dros Sgiliau ac Addysg Drydyddol

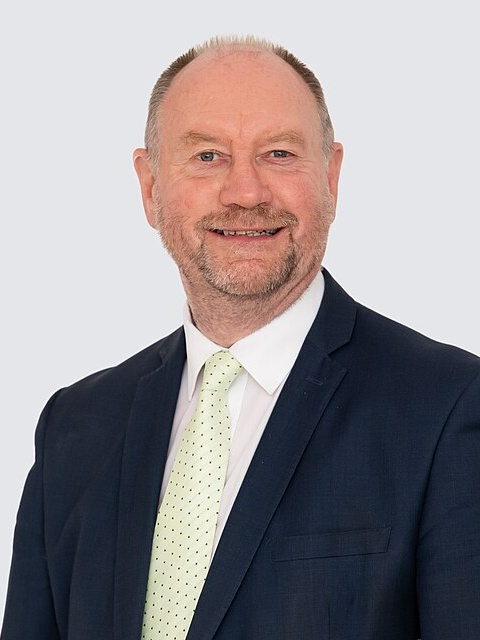
- Incumbent; Cefin Campbell since 13 May 2026
- Welsh Government
- Style: Welsh Deputy Minister
- Status: Deputy Minister
- Abbreviation: Deputy Minister
- Member of: Senedd
- Reports to: the Senedd and the First Minister of Wales
- Seat: Cardiff
- Nominator: First Minister of Wales
- Appointer: The Crown
- Term length: Four years; Subject to elections to the Senedd which take place every four years
- First holder: Hannah Blythyn MS
- Salary: £101,443 (MS pay + £25,063 Deputy Minister pay)

The Deputy Minister for Skills and Tertiary Education (Welsh: Dirprwy Weinidog dros Sgiliau ac Addysg Drydyddol) is a minister of the Welsh Government. The current officeholder is Cefin Campbell since May 2026.

== Deputy ministers ==
Name	Picture	Entered office	Left office	Other offices held	Political party	Government	Notes
Deputy Minister for Skills
John Griffiths		19 July 2007	10 December 2009		Labour Co-op	Fourth Rhodri Morgan government	
Deputy Minister for Science, Innovation and Skills
Lesley Griffiths		December 2009	11 May 2011		Labour	First Jones government	
Deputy Minister for Skills and Technology
Ken Skates		26 June 2013	11 September 2014		Labour	Second Jones government	
Julie James		11 September 2014	3 November 2017		Labour	Third Jones government	
Deputy Minister for Social Partnership
Hannah Blythyn		13 May 2021	20 March 2024		Labour Co-op	Second Drakeford government	
Minister for Social Partnership
Hannah Blythyn		21 March 2024	16 May 2024		Labour Co-op	Gething government	
Sarah Murphy		17 May 2024	17 July 2024		Labour Co-op	Gething government	
Jack Sargeant		17 July 2024	11 September 2024		Labour	Gething government Eluned Morgan government	
Minister for Culture, Skills and Social Partnership
Jack Sargeant		11 September 2024	12 May 2026		Labour	Eluned Morgan government	
Deputy Minister for Skills and Tertiary Education
Cefin Campbell		13 May 2026	Incumbent		Plaid Cymru	ap Iorwerth government	

== Responsibilities ==
The responsibilities of the post include:

- Reform of Seren Programme
- Tertiary Education & Research strategy, policy, funding, quality & learner experience
- Medr
- Post-16 Education Workforce including engagement, pay and conditions, workload and wellbeing
- Student Support arrangements including Education Maintenance Allowance, Welsh Government Learning Grant, Higher Education Student Finance and lead for Student Loan Company
- Apprenticeship strategy and policy
- Skills strategy and policy including alignment with Enterprise, Connectivity and Energy portfolio
- International learning and strategy, including the International Learning Exchange Programme (Taith) and Global Wales
- Credit and Qualifications Framework
- Increasing and widening post-16 participation
- Lifelong Learning
- National Occupation Standards

The post used to lead the social partnership engagement and the development of the Social Partnership and Public Procurement (Wales) Act.

== See also ==
- Ministry
