= Eluned Morgan government =

Government of Wales from 2024 to 2026

- 13th devolved government of Wales
- 2024–2026
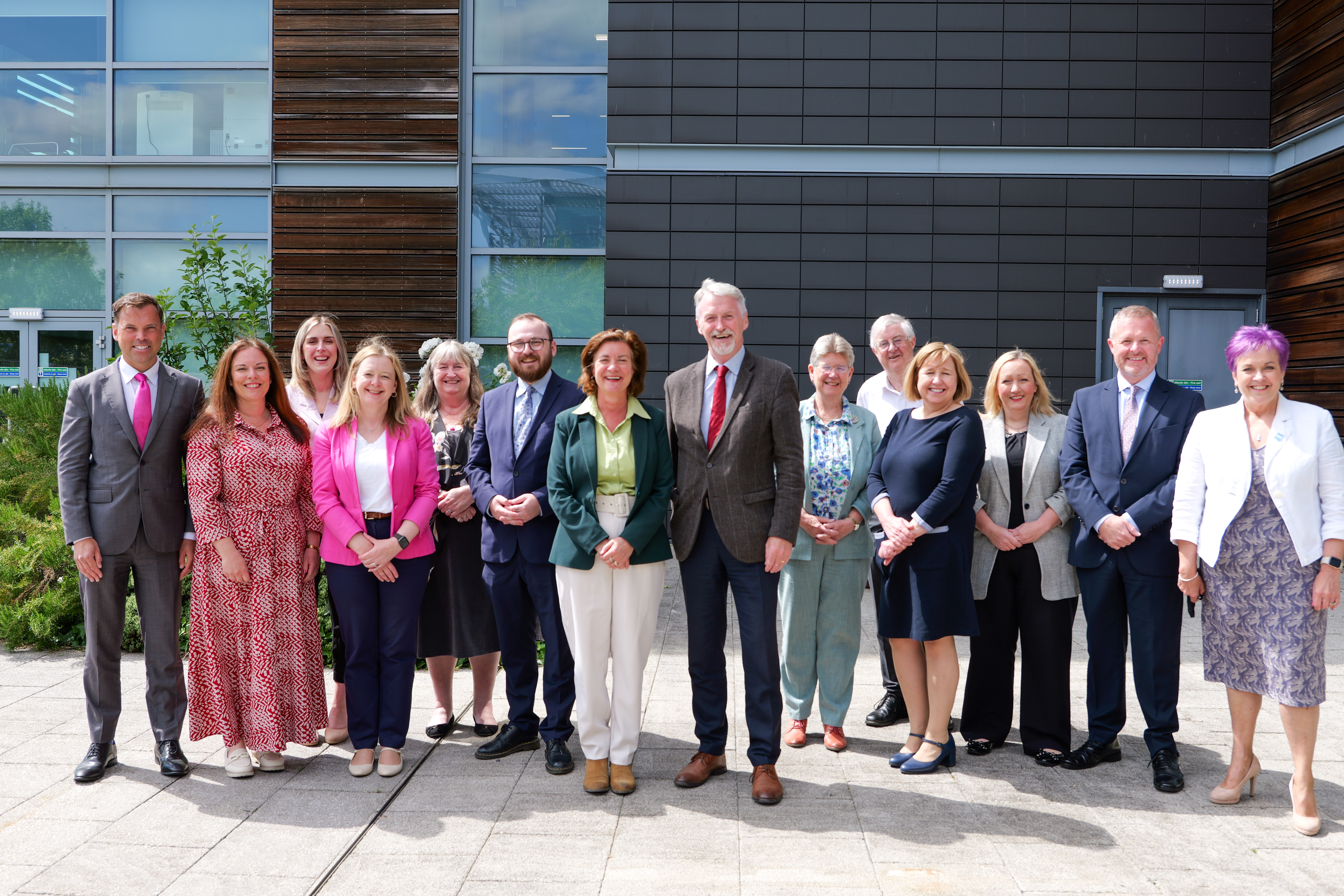
- Morgan's cabinet meeting in Aberystwyth in June 2025
- Date formed: 6 August 2024
- Date dissolved: 12 May 2026

People and organisations
- Monarch: Charles III
- First Minister: Eluned Morgan
- Deputy First Minister: Huw Irranca-Davies
- Member parties: Labour
- Status in legislature: Minority
- Opposition cabinet: Fourth Shadow Cabinet of Andrew RT Davies; Shadow Cabinet of Darren Millar
- Opposition party: Conservative
- Opposition leader: Andrew RT Davies (2024); Darren Millar (2024-2026)

History
- Incoming formation: July 2024 Welsh Labour leadership election
- Outgoing election: 2026 Senedd election
- Legislature term: 6th Senedd
- Predecessor: Gething government
- Successor: ap Iorwerth government

The Eluned Morgan government was the government of Wales formed by Eluned Morgan from August 2024, following her appointment as First Minister of Wales on 6 August. Morgan first formed an interim government largely continuing the previous Gething government, then announced a fuller reshuffle in September 2024.

In her interim cabinet she maintained many of the roles and roleholders from the previous Gething government. With the few changes being that she appointed former First Minister Mark Drakeford as her successor to her former role as Cabinet Secretary for Health and Social Care, a role he himself held between 2013 and 2016, and designated Elisabeth Jones as Counsel General-designate.

On 11 September 2024, Morgan announced her cabinet reshuffle. Jeremy Miles and Julie James returned to cabinet following their resignations under Gething, and as health cabinet secretary and Counsel General-designate respectively, with the latter replacing Jones. While Vikki Howells was given a junior role for the first time. All the other members of the cabinet had their roles amended or switched but remained in government, with Huw Irranca-Davies and Lynne Neagle retaining their former roles entirely.

In addition to her cabinet appointments, Morgan also appointed former MP Kevin Brennan as her chief special adviser in August. Brennan stepped down to join the House of Lords, and was replaced by Wayne David. David was then replaced by Citizens Advice Head of Policy, and former Welsh Labour Head of Communications, Luke Young as her new Chief Special Adviser.

== History ==
Eluned Morgan was nominated and appointed to succeed Vaughan Gething as first minister of Wales on 6 August 2024. Later that day, she announced the appointment of Huw Irranca-Davies as her deputy first minister. This was the first time a deputy first minister had been appointed to the Welsh Government since Ieuan Wyn Jones in 2007.

Morgan announced the rest of her cabinet on 7 August. Her first cabinet was appointed to serve on an interim basis, with most members of her government retaining the same posts they had in the previous Gething government. Changes included the appointment of former first minister Mark Drakeford as the interim cabinet secretary for health and social care, succeeding Morgan as the previous officeholder, as well as Elisabeth Jones as the counsel general-designate to act as the counsel general for Wales for an interim period. Morgan retained her previous responsibility for the Welsh language. The cabinet will remain in place for an interim period until September 2024, when a full cabinet reshuffle "following a listening exercise over the summer with the Welsh public" is planned.

In addition to her cabinet, Morgan also appointed former MP Kevin Brennan, who had served as former first minister Rhodri Morgan's chief of staff, as her chief special adviser.

=== September reshuffle ===
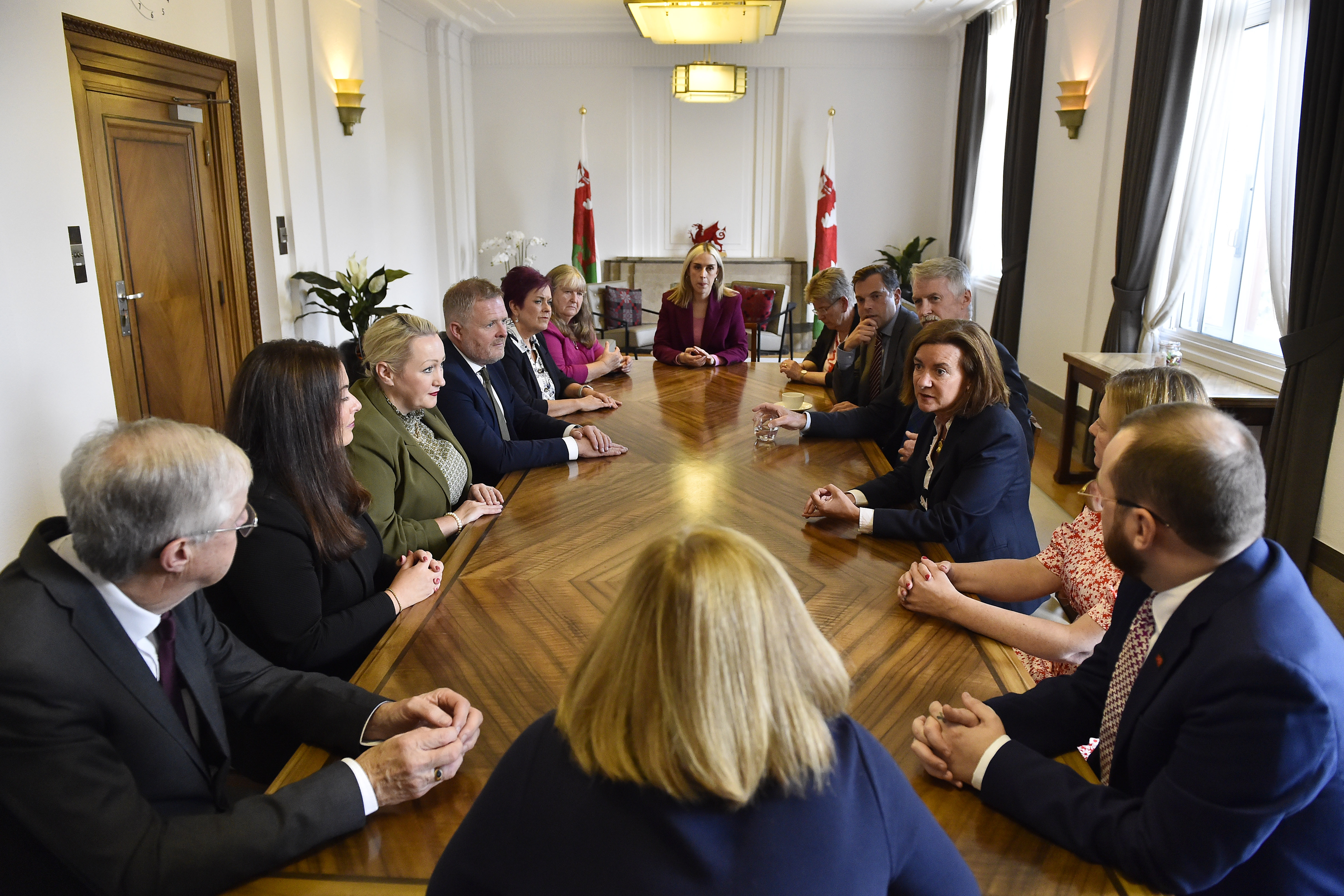
Morgan's cabinet meeting on 11 September 2024

On 11 September 2024, Morgan reshuffled her cabinet. She appointed Jeremy Miles as Cabinet Secretary for Health and Social Care, and Mark Drakeford as Cabinet Secretary for Finance, while Ken Skates lost his role as Cabinet Secretary for the Economy, while retaining his roles as Cabinet Secretary for Transport and Minister for North Wales. She designated Julie James as Counsel General, alongside appointing her Minister for Delivery. She also appointed Vikki Howells as Minister for Further and Higher Education, and added Culture and Skills to Jack Sargeant's portfolios, alongside Social Partnership. Julie James was formally appointed as Counsel General by approval of the Senedd on 17 September 2024.

Alongside these changes, a number of ministers were retained in their prior positions.

In December 2024, Morgan announced that her chief special adviser Kevin Brennan would resign from the government in the new year after he was nominated for a peerage by Prime Minister Keir Starmer. Former MP and MEP Wayne David was announced as his successor.

=== Budgets ===
After the collapse of the co-operation agreement between Welsh Labour and Plaid Cymru in May 2024 budgets agreements had to be made on every occasion. The first budget in 2025 by the Morgan government was made with the single Welsh Liberal Democrat MS, Jane Dodds. This included extra funding for childcare, councils and transport. Also included was a commitment to ban greyhound racing.

After the Caerphilly by-election in October 2025 the government lost its majority. This led to agreement discussions between Welsh Labour and with Jane Dodds, Conservatives and independent MS Russell George. In the end Plaid Cymru agreed to a deal and abstained in the budget vote to allow it to pass. For this concession Plaid and Labour agreed to extra funding for health, infrastructure and councils.

== Cabinets ==
=== August–September 2024 ===
==== Cabinet Secretaries ====
Portfolio	Name	Constituency	Party	Term
First Minister of Wales	The Baroness Morgan of Ely MS	Mid & West Wales	Labour	August 2024 – 2026
Deputy First Minister of Wales; Cabinet Secretary for Climate Change and Rural Affairs	Huw Irranca-Davies MS	Ogmore	Labour	August 2024 – 2026
Cabinet Secretary for Finance, Constitution and Cabinet Office	Rebecca Evans MS	Gower	Labour	2018 - September 2024
Cabinet Secretary for Housing, Local Government, and Planning	Jayne Bryant MS	Newport West	Labour	August 2024 – 2026
Cabinet Secretary for Health and Social Care	Mark Drakeford MS	Cardiff West	Labour	August 2024 - September 2024
Cabinet Secretary for the Economy, Transport and North Wales	Ken Skates MS	Clwyd South	Labour	2024 – 2026
Cabinet Secretary for Culture, Social Justice, Trefnydd (House Leader) and Chief Whip	Jane Hutt MS	Vale of Glamorgan	Labour	2024 – 2026
Cabinet Secretary for Education	Lynne Neagle MS	Torfaen	Labour	2024 – 2026

==== Ministers ====
Portfolio	Name	Constituency	Party	Term
Minister for Mental Health and Early Years	Sarah Murphy MS	Bridgend	Labour	2024 – 2026
Minister for Social Care	Dawn Bowden MS	Merthyr Tydfil and Rhymney	Labour	2024 – 2026
Minister for Social Partnership	Jack Sargeant MS	Alyn and Deeside	Labour	2024 – 2026
Counsel General Designate	Elisabeth Jones	N/A	N/A	August 2024 – September 2024

==== Other appointments ====
- Kevin Brennan – chief special adviser to the First Minister

=== September 2024 – May 2026 ===
On 11 September 2024, Morgan announced changes to her cabinet and the new cabinet is as follows:

==== Cabinet Secretaries ====
Portfolio	Name	Constituency	Party	Term
First Minister of Wales	The Baroness Morgan of Ely MS	Mid & West Wales	Labour	August 2024 – 2026
Deputy First Minister of Wales Cabinet Secretary for Climate Change and Rural Affairs	Huw Irranca-Davies MS	Ogmore	Labour	August 2024 – 2026
Cabinet Secretary for Finance and Welsh Language	Mark Drakeford MS	Cardiff West	Labour	September 2024 – 2026
Cabinet Secretary for Economy, Energy and Planning	Rebecca Evans MS	Gower	Labour	September 2024 – 2026
Cabinet Secretary for Housing, and Local Government	Jayne Bryant MS	Newport West	Labour	September 2024 – 2026
Cabinet Secretary for Health and Social Care	Jeremy Miles MS	Neath	Labour	September 2024 – 2026
Cabinet Secretary for Transport and North Wales	Ken Skates MS	Clwyd South	Labour	September 2024 – 2026
Cabinet Secretary for Social Justice, Trefnydd (House Leader) and Chief Whip	Jane Hutt MS	Vale of Glamorgan	Labour	September 2024 – 2026
Cabinet Secretary for Education	Lynne Neagle MS	Torfaen	Labour	2024 – 2026

==== Ministers ====
Portfolio	Name	Constituency	Party	Term
Minister for Mental Health and Wellbeing	Sarah Murphy MS	Bridgend	Labour	September 2024 – 2026
Minister for Children and Social Care	Dawn Bowden MS	Merthyr Tydfil and Rhymney	Labour	September 2024 – 2026
Minister for Culture, Skills and Social Partnership	Jack Sargeant MS	Alyn and Deeside	Labour	September 2024 – 2026
Minister for Further and Higher Education	Vikki Howells MS	Cynon Valley	Labour	September 2024 – 2026
Counsel General and Minister for Delivery	Julie James	Swansea West	Labour	September 2024 – 2026

== See also ==
- Shadow Cabinet of Wales
- Members of the 6th Senedd
