= Cabinet Secretary for Transport =

Cabinet Secretary for Transport may refer to:

- Cabinet Secretary for Transport (Wales), a Welsh government position
- Cabinet Secretary for Transport (Scotland), a Scottish government position
