= Third Menai Crossing =

Proposed Menai Strait bridge in Wales

Coordinates: 53.2168°N 4.1837°W

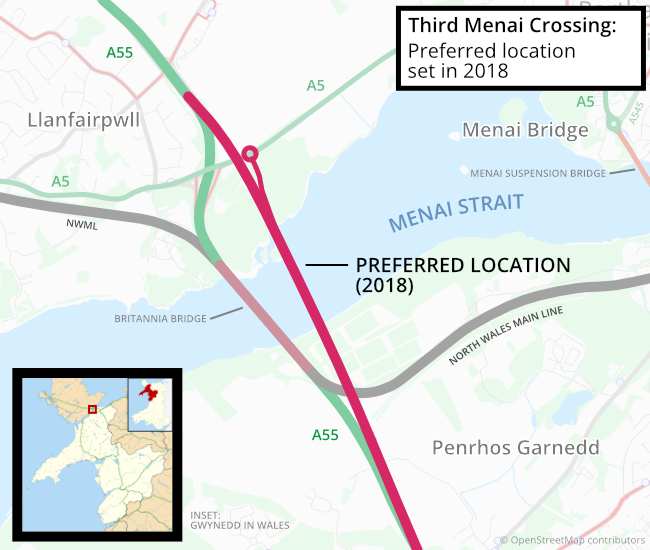
- Preferred location of the crossing in 2018, before cancellation
- Location: Menai Strait, Wales
- Project website: gov.wales/a55-3rd-menai-crossing-0
- Status: Scrapped (2023), replaced with transport strategy review
- Type: Dual-carriageway road bridge
- Cost estimate: £400 million (2022)
- Start date: cancelled

The Third Menai Crossing (or (A55) 3rd Menai Crossing) was a proposed bridge over the Menai Strait, connecting the Isle of Anglesey with mainland Wales. The bridge was proposed to carry the A55 as a dual carriageway, and would have superseded the current A55 Britannia Bridge.

There were proposals for a tunnel in 2001, but these were deemed implausible. The first proposals for a bridge were made in 2007, with a preferred route for the bridge being selected in 2018.

The crossing was projected to cost £400 million and to take seven years to build. While no exact bridge design had been confirmed, a local civil engineer suggested it be supported by statues of Brân the Blessed (Bendigeidfran).

In June 2021, the Welsh Government indefinitely paused the proposal's progress as part of a review of road building projects over concerns of climate change emissions. In December 2022, the government had set 2030 as a "likely" date for the bridge's completion but did not formally commit whether the project would go ahead.

On 14 February 2023, the Welsh Government announced that the entire project would not go ahead, citing efforts to reduce car usage, its environmental impact and it being a "blot" on the landscape. The "Menai Corridor" public transport strategy review would be set up to replace plans for the formerly proposed crossing, with recommendations to be presented by the North Wales Transport Commission by mid-2023. The problem of financing the project was later stated by the government as another reason why the project could not proceed. Lee Waters, deputy minister for climate change, later stated the crossing could be considered again as part of a wider review into the infrastructure of North Wales, rather than separately. The review into North Wales' infrastructure did not support a third crossing, but recognised that there might be future reasons to consider it.

== Background and history ==
There are currently two crossings over the Menai Strait: the Menai Suspension Bridge, carrying the A5; and Britannia Bridge, carrying the A55 and railway line. The A5 Menai Bridge is both height and width restrictive, whereas the Britannia Bridge is the only part of the 87-mile (140 km) A55 that is a single carriageway (one lane each way compared to two lanes each way on the rest of the route). The Britannia Bridge was originally only for rail traffic, until it was rebuilt in the 20th century, opening it for road traffic.

In 2001, an early proposal for a third crossing was for a tunnel to be built under the strait connecting a site near Gaerwen on Anglesey, and a site near Bangor on the mainland. It was not considered due to its lack of plausibility, as there is a geological fault in the strait and the cost of a tunnel was excessive.

A later proposal was to convert the Britannia Bridge into three lanes, with one of the lanes alternating direction depending on rush-hour priority during the day. The proposal was unconvincing to road planners, who said the bridge was too narrow and traffic approached the bridge at high speed. But the initial feasibility study had proved positive for a three-lane Britannia Bridge, and the idea is brought up as a short-term solution to relieve congestion on the crossings.

In 2007, a public consultation on the crossings first proposed a third crossing, and it presented four/five options to carry traffic over the strait. The four options, (or five if including no new bridge as an option) were:

- Build no new bridge, as either "do nothing"; or simply increase connectivity between A55 and A5 (to the Menai Bridge).
- Widen existing Britannia Bridge
- Build a new multi-span bridge east of the existing Britannia Bridge
- Build a new long-span bridge east of the existing Britannia Bridge
- Build a bridge to the west of the existing Britannia Bridge.

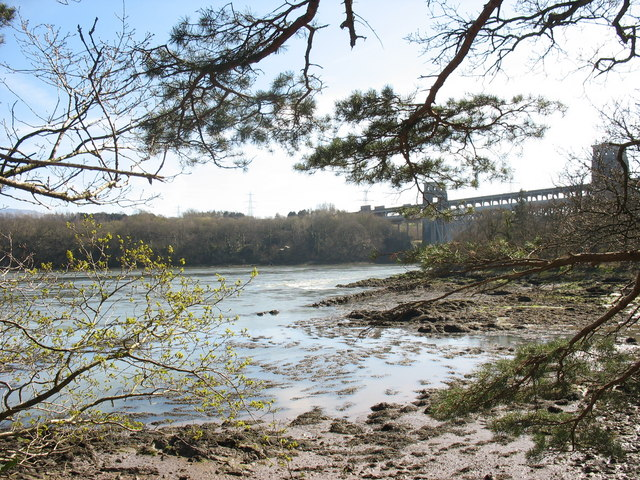
The Britannia Bridge from the east on Anglesey, roughly on the proposed preferred route of the third crossing.

All options apart from "do nothing" also involved improvements to A55 Junctions 9 and 8A, and for some eastern bridges junction 8.

During the public consultation the Welsh government stated its objectives for the proposed crossing:

- to improve journey times and journey reliability between A55 Junctions 7 and 10,
- to improve network resilience by providing an alternative bridge during maintenance and emergencies,
- to improve accessibility for pedestrians and cyclists,
- to promote safer trips over the strait.

70 per cent of the respondents to the consultation supported a new bridge.

Following plans in 2011 for a Wylfa Newydd nuclear power station on Anglesey, concerns over increased construction road traffic for the new power station on the two existing bridges were raised, and a third crossing was proposed as a potential solution. Plans for the power station were paused in 2019, potentially impacting the case for the crossing.

In 2013, the Welsh Government announced the project would be back on their agenda.

A Strategic Outline Business case by the Welsh Government backed the need for a crossing in 2016. Plaid Cymru had welcomed the proposal in 2016, as a way to tackle traffic congestion in the area. Welsh Conservative MS, Russell George said such a project was "long overdue". In October 2017, the Welsh Government and Plaid Cymru agreed in a draft budget to allocate £3 million to support the design and development of the third crossing. The crossing was estimated to cost £135 million in December 2017.

In October 2018, First Minister of Wales Carwyn Jones announced the preferred option. The option chosen was described as the "purple route", involving a new bridge to be built to the east of (but not directly next to) the existing Britannia Bridge, with facilities for pedestrians and cyclists. This option received 25% of the first choice vote of respondents in a public consultation. A bridge design was not selected at the time; a local engineer had proposed it be supported by statues of Brân the Blessed. Extending Garth Pier across the strait as a pedestrian and cyclist crossing was also proposed by a local, but deemed unrealistic.

The Welsh Government stated in 2017 that construction was expected to start soon, take two years to construct, and potentially open by 2021, but this was delayed due to the COVID-19 pandemic. In June 2021, after the 2021 Senedd election, the project was indefinitely shelved by Deputy Minister for Climate Change (with responsibility for Transport) Lee Waters, as part of a review of all proposed road construction projects in Wales and how to reduce carbon emissions over concerns of climate change. A decision was expected to be made by November 2022, but this was delayed, with Waters stating cuts in the November 2022 United Kingdom autumn statement by Chancellor of the Exchequer, Jeremy Hunt as the reason for the delay.

In December 2022, the Welsh Government announced that a new crossing starting construction by 2027, and to be completed by 2029–30, was "likely", but the government had not formally committed to the project. Waters however stated such a crossing would take seven years to build. This announcement followed the temporary closure of the Menai Suspension Bridge from October 2022 to early 2023 for urgent safety repairs, causing severe congestion on the Britannia Bridge and the local area, and media reported this increased calls for a third crossing.

=== Scrapping ===
On 14 February 2023, it was announced that the project would not go ahead, as part of the Welsh Government roads review, over concerns of increasing car usage and therefore carbon emissions.

Before scrapping the project, the government had spent £2 million on planning for the project.

The roads review stated that the project should not go ahead as efforts being made to reduce car usage would make a new bridge redundant, and it would have a major environmental impact. The review stated the construction of the purple route would cause "large" to "moderate" impacts on local protected SSSIs and SACs, as well as destroying ancient woodland and being "a blot on the existing landscape".

Traffic models stated in the review showed projected increases in traffic from 2017 to 2038 of 17% and 18% on the Britannia and Menai Suspension bridges respectively. However such models were performed before the Welsh Government announced its commitment to reduce car use, and its announcement of the North Wales Metro.

The crossing was to be replaced by a review for a "Menai Corridor" public transport strategy, whose first recommendations were to be presented by the North Wales Transport Commission by mid-2023 on how to improve congestion and resilience of the existing bridges. Andrew Forgrave, of the Daily Post, raised wind shielding, new traffic controls and signage as potential alternative improvements.

Lee Waters, still deputy minister for Climate Change, justified the scrapping, saying the review put the issue of climate change and meeting net zero at the centre of decision making, and they should not be "doing the same thing over and over", for Wales to meet the net zero target. Waters stated new roads are still being built, although they must meet stricter criteria, and that they are investing in alternative non-road transport projects. Waters also admitted the government may not have the finances to fund all the projects, and criticised the UK Government's lack of investment in infrastructure. Waters stated that due to the Welsh Government's lack of funds, various projects would "not be happening any time soon [...] [The Welsh Government] haven't got the money". In another statement, Waters said a third crossing could be considered as part of a wider review of the infrastructure of North Wales by the Burns Commission, and that there is a need to be "pragmatic" rather than "be[ing] dogmatic about [the crossing]".

=== Post-scrapping ===
A campaign group "Britain Remade" started organising support for a new crossing, grouping supporters of the scheme such as Virginia Crosbie, Conservative MP for Ynys Môn, and local Plaid Cymru councillors. Polling done by the group claimed the government's scrapping of the project was opposed by 46% of those polled residing in North Wales, compared to 33% supporting the scrapping who were also located in North Wales. In November 2023, the group launched a petition for a third crossing, and argued that constructing new roads can be done alongside efforts to tackle climate change, with the group's research claiming that the impact 370 miles of new UK roads had a minimal increase in carbon emissions, and that new roads increase the appeal for electric cars.

In December 2023, the North Wales Transport Commission, set up following the roads review, and led by former permanent secretary to the UK Treasury Terry Burns, revealed its sixteen recommendations for the Menai Strait crossings. These ranged from installing wind deflectors on the Britannia Bridge, reconfiguring junctions, introducing park-and-rides, increasing train frequency, banning overtaking on the Menai Suspension Bridge, as well as lowering the speed limit and implementing camera enforcement on the Britannia Bridge. It proposed a study into a three-lane tidal system at peak traffic times but did question whether there would be any benefits of the three-lane system, due to the investment needed and ongoing costs of a scheme. The commission recognised calls to introduce road tolling on the bridges but did not recommend it. The commission did not list a third crossing among its recommendations, but said they recognised that there may be some reasons to consider it in the future, such as the status of Wylfa Newydd nuclear power station.

== Proposed location ==
Three potential locations were considered in 2017, all around the Britannia Bridge. A 'red option' west of the Britannia Bridge, an 'orange option' directly to the east, or a 'purple option' further to the east of the Britannia Bridge, with the latter, later chosen. All options minimally involved improvements to the A55 junction 9 and 8A.

The preferred proposed location for the crossing, selected from a set of four options in October 2018, was situated east (but not directly next) of the existing Britannia Bridge. The location was within a Special Landscape and Marine Character Area, as well as the Anglesey AONB.

=== Alternative location ===
When the scrapping of the project was announced in February 2023, it was revealed an alternative "Sienna" option was considered by planners, as well as reserving land for the orange route as a backup. The Sienna option would have involved a four-lane bridge being built closer to the existing Britannia Bridge than the chosen purple option, and having a much lower deck, to protect views of the existing bridge. A "Three Bridges Park" development was then proposed alongside the third crossing proposal in the hope the three bridges would become a tourist attraction and provide "wider economic benefits". However, there was no indication the proposal was seriously considered by the Welsh Government before it scrapped the crossing project entirely.

== Design and cost ==
Four bridge types were considered during the 2017 public consultation. The four types considered were: a single-span extrados, two-span extrados, two-span balanced cantilever or a single-span cable-stayed bridge. The balanced cantilever design was most favoured by respondents due to its low profile.

A local civil engineer, Benji Poulton, disagreed that the new bridge should have a low profile, stating it "looked a bit more like a motorway overpass", so instead put forward a proposal for the bridge to be held up by a statue of Brân the Blessed (Bendigeidfran), a Welsh mythological figure. The concept won a design competition, with a petition for it later launched, receiving near 300 signatures. The Welsh Government included the concept in its appraisal process to its project consultants.

The bridge was proposed to have wind protection to avoid the bridge being closed to road traffic under stormy conditions.

The bridge would be fully funded by the Welsh Government, as of 2022. Although it was hoped in 2017, that the National Grid would provide funds for the project in the event their cables are carried along the new bridge instead of their own proposed £100 million tunnel under the strait connecting to the proposed Wylfa Newydd nuclear power station. A tunnel was proposed by the National Grid instead of electricity pylons to protect the area's natural beauty. Llyr Gruffydd, Plaid Cymru MS, said the combined project would make a crossing "more feasible". A 2018 National Grid and Welsh Government study was set up to investigate the proposal.

The crossing was estimated to cost £135 million in 2017, but increased to £400 million by 2022. Design consultants for the crossing were stated to be AECOM, RML and Knight Architects.

== Criticism ==
The justification for a crossing was stated to be weaker following a decrease in the predicted traffic forecasts across the strait, due to the impact of Brexit on the Port of Holyhead and the shelving of the planned Wylfa Newydd nuclear power station.

Criticism was also directed towards the managing of the proposal.

=== On slowed progress ===
The Welsh Government has been criticised for the slow progress with the project.

Russell George, Conservative MS, had criticised the slow progress of the project, which George said was "long overdue". George said that the project had been in the works for "more than a decade [...] yet the Welsh Government have done nothing". Mark Isherwood, Conservative MS also criticised the slow progress following the announcement that the project would be reviewed in June 2021. Lee Waters, Deputy Minister for Climate Change stated "all schemes not currently in the ground need to be reviewed" and the congestion "can be dealt with in other ways" such as more road maintenance and improved public transport.

Rhun ap Iorwerth, Plaid Cymru MS, called on the government to "act quickly" following the temporary Menai Bridge closure in late 2022. Lee Waters responded stating the project would not be a solution in the near future and would require a lot of consideration in particular over the £400 million cost, and that alternative shorter-term arrangements without a bridge were also being considered.

The Welsh Conservatives accused the government of failing to fix a known defect on the Menai Bridge for 20 years, causing its temporary closure, and called for the third crossing proposal to be "accelerated given the new bridge will take seven years to build".

=== On scrapping and alternatives ===
On 14 February 2023, it was announced that the project would not go ahead, as part of the Welsh Government roads review, over concerns of increasing car usage and therefore carbon emissions.

Rhun ap Iorwerth, Plaid Cymru MS, described the scrapping as an "insult" to the people of Anglesey, with the project being described as "desperately needed", and later stated it would be needed to address the existing "extremely weak crossing [over the Menai Strait] [...] that needs strengthening for the long term". He also stated that alternative plans instead of a third crossing had become contradictory. Ap Iorwerth highlighted that the Welsh Government hopes to double the rail line on the Britannia Bridge, which it is currently single track. While at the same time increase pedestrian and cyclist links across the strait, which currently utilises the empty space on the Britannia Bridge where another rail track would be.

Virginia Crosbie, Conservative MP for Ynys Môn, criticised the recommended scrapping stated it "lack[ed] common sense" and would "systematically destroy the Welsh economy". Crosbie argued the crossing should be considered as "our roads are getting greener", providing the use of electric vehicles as an example.

Ken Skates, Labour MS and former transport minister, called for devolution of transport to North Wales, over the scrapping of the majority of North Wales' road projects.

== See also ==
- List of bridges in Wales
