= 2026 Welsh Labour leadership election =

Welsh Labour leadership election

- 9–15 July 2026
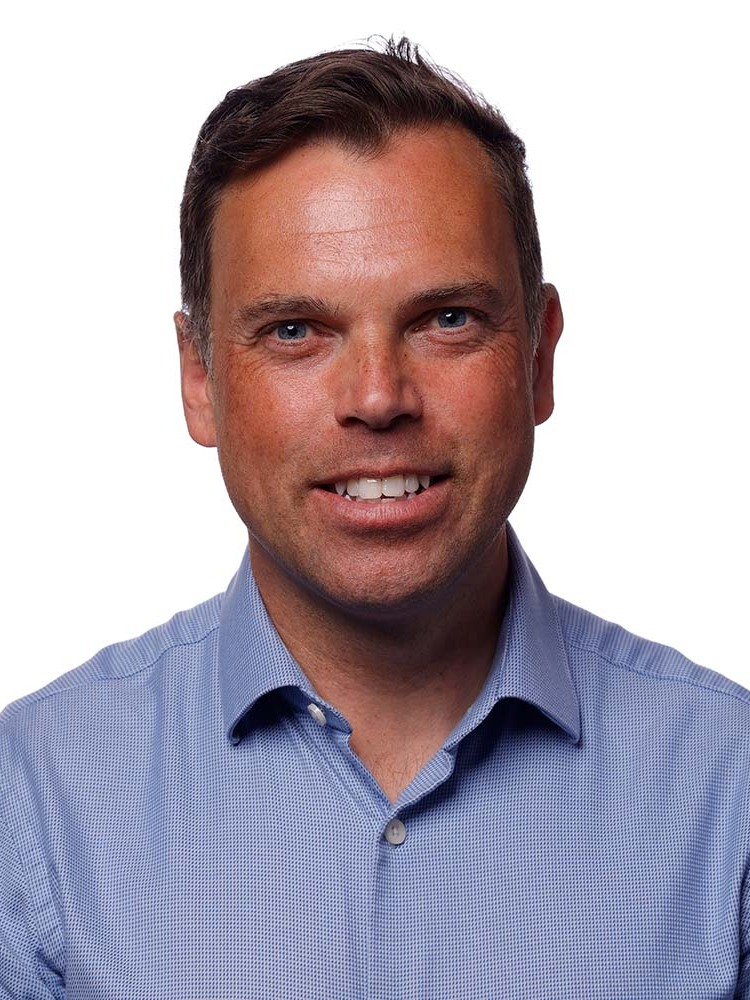
Candidate	Ken Skates
Popular vote	Unopposed
Leader before election
Ken Skates (interim)
Eluned Morgan
Elected Leader
Ken Skates

A leadership election was held to elect the next leader of Welsh Labour after First Minister Eluned Morgan failed to win her seat in Ceredigion Penfro in the 2026 Senedd election and resigned on 8 May 2026. This was the party's first leadership election since it lost control of the Senedd in May 2026, and therefore the new leader became the first not to be Welsh First Minister.

On 9 May 2026, Ken Skates was appointed as interim leader of Welsh Labour. On 15 July, Skates became the party's permanent leader after being appointed unopposed. He is the party's fourth leader in just over two years, after Morgan, Vaughan Gething and Mark Drakeford.

== Procedure ==
The Leader of Welsh Labour has to be a member of the Senedd. Candidates needed nominations from either 20 percent of the party's Senedd group (equating to two other members), ten percent of Labour MSs (one other member) and 20 percent of Constituency Labour Parties (equivalent to seven CLPs), or ten percent of MSs and three nominations from Welsh Labour affiliated organisations which must have included at least two affiliated trade unions.

The contest was initially scheduled to commence in September, but it was moved up on 8 July 2026. Welsh Labour MSs had a week from 9 July to declare who they supported. However, as all Labour MSs had supported interim leader Ken Skates, he was confirmed as the new leader on 15 July.

== Candidates ==
=== Declared ===
- Ken Skates, interim leader, Member of the Senedd for Fflint Wrecsam, former Cabinet Secretary for Transport and North Wales

=== Declined ===
- Mike Hedges, Member of the Senedd for Gŵyr Abertawe (endorsed Skates)
- Lynne Neagle, Member of the Senedd for Sir Fynwy Torfaen, former Cabinet Secretary for Education (endorsed Skates)
- Shav Taj, Member of the Senedd for Caerdydd Ffynnon Taf (endorsed Skates)
- Huw Thomas, Member of the Senedd for Caerdydd Penarth (endorsed Skates)
