= Gething government =

Welsh Government in 2024

- 12th devolved government of Wales
- March-August 2024
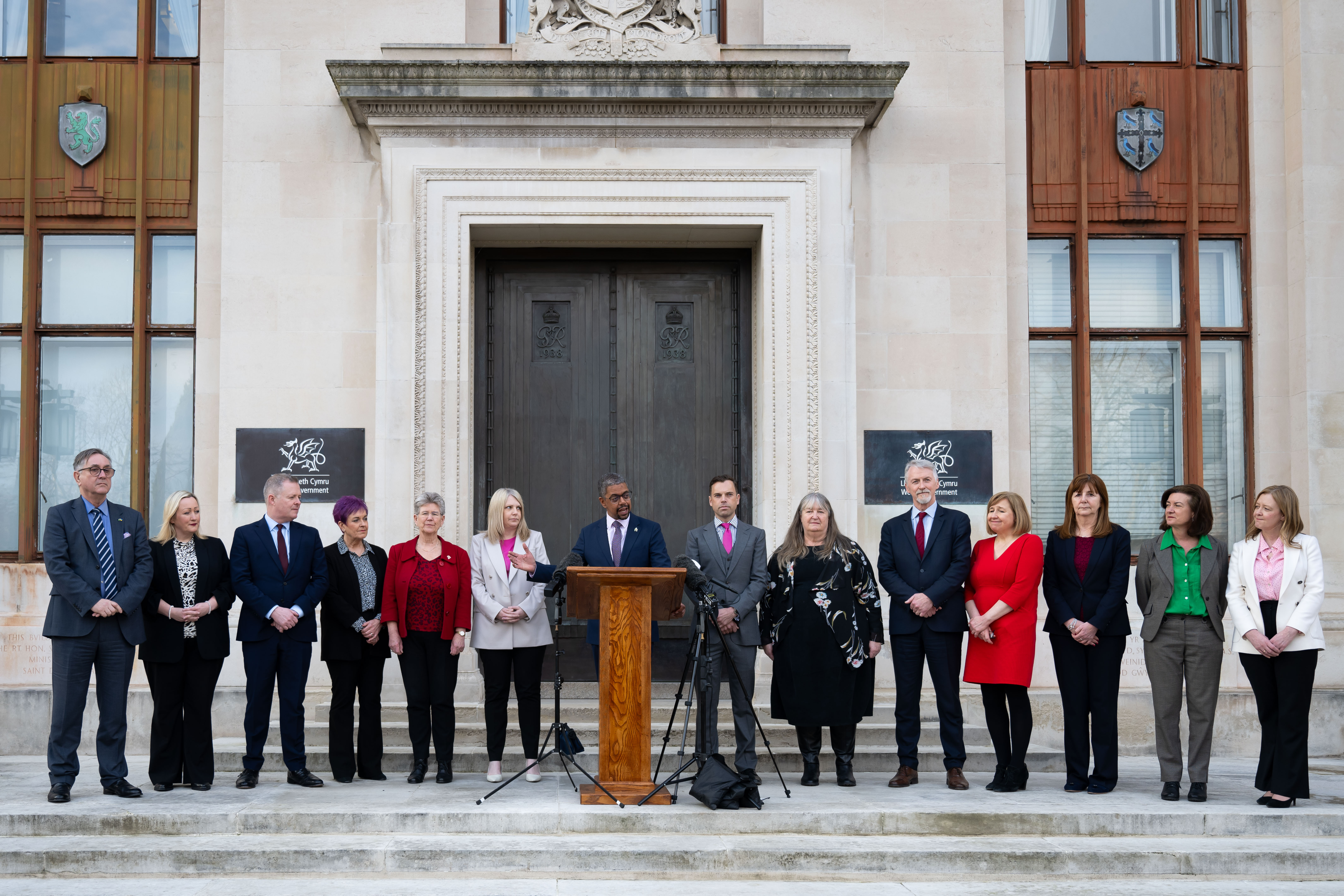
- Gething's cabinet on 21 March 2024
- Date formed: 21 March 2024
- Date dissolved: 5 August 2024

People and organisations
- Monarch: Charles III
- First Minister: Vaughan Gething
- Ministers removed: 5
- Member parties: Labour
- Status in legislature: Minority in co-operation with Plaid Cymru until May 2024
- Opposition cabinet: Fourth Shadow Cabinet of Andrew RT Davies
- Opposition party: Conservative
- Opposition leader: Andrew R. T. Davies

History
- Incoming formation: February–March 2024 Welsh Labour leadership election
- Outgoing formation: July 2024 Welsh Labour leadership election (Note: Due to 2024 Welsh government crisis.)
- Legislature term: 6th Senedd
- Predecessor: Second Drakeford government
- Successor: Eluned Morgan government

The Gething government was the Labour-led government of Wales formed on 21 March 2024 following the appointment of Vaughan Gething as First Minister on 20 March 2024.

== History ==
Following the resignation of Mark Drakeford, Gething was elected Leader of the Labour party on 16 March 2024 and appointed First Minister on 20 March. He became the first black leader of any European country.

Gething announced his cabinet on 21 March. Upon appointing his cabinet, Gething stated "this stellar ministerial team will answer the call of the generation in wanting to create a stronger, fairer, greener Wales". Senior ministers in the cabinet were once again named "cabinet secretaries" with junior ministers referred to as "ministers", as they were in Carwyn Jones's third government.

=== Formation ===
Rebecca Evans retained the Finance portfolio and was appointed Cabinet Secretary for Finance, Constitution and Cabinet Office, assuming the responsibilities for Constitution from Mick Antoniw who was reappointed the Counsel General.

Deputy Minister for Social Services Julie Morgan and Deputy Minister for Climate Change Lee Waters both left their respective positions upon the formation of the new government, with Dawn Bowden assuming the Social Care brief. Hannah Blythyn retained the Social Partnership portfolio.

Huw Irranca-Davies returned to cabinet as Cabinet Secretary for Climate Change and Rural Affairs. Irranca-Davies replaced Julie James in the Climate Change portfolio, who was appointed Cabinet Secretary for Housing, Local Government, and Planning. Irranca-Davies also replaced Lesley Griffiths in the Rural Affairs portfolio, with Griffiths bring appointed Cabinet Secretary for Culture and Social Justice. Griffifths replaced Jane Hutt in the Social Justice portfolio, and Hutt assumed Griffifths' former position as Trefnydd of the Senedd, with Hutt also keeping her position as Chief Whip. Ken Skates returned to Cabinet as Cabinet Secretary for North Wales and Transport, replacing Griffiths in the North Wales portfolio.

The Deputy Minister for Mental Health and Wellbeing Lynne Neagle was promoted to Cabinet Secretary for Education, replacing Jeremy Miles. Miles, who Gething defeated in the leadership contest, succeeded Gething in the Economy portfolio as Cabinet Secretary for Economy, Energy and Welsh Language. Jayne Bryant, who co-chaired Gething's campaign, joined the government as Minister for Mental Health and Early Years.

=== Changes and Dissolution ===
On 16 May 2024, Gething announced that he had dismissed Blythyn from the government. In his statement, Gething stated that he had "no alternative" after reviewing evidence regarding a "recent disclosure of communication to the media." Blythyn denied the allegations. Sarah Murphy was appointed to Blythyn's former role on 17 May 2024.

On 16 July 2024, four ministers resigned from the government. Counsel General Mick Antoniw, Cabinet Secretary for Economy Jeremy Miles, Cabinet Secretary for Housing Julie James and Cabinet Secretary for Culture Lesley Griffiths. Shortly after, Gething himself resigned as First Minister and Leader of Welsh Labour, and will remain in office until his successor is elected.

Gething also made tweaks to the remaining cabinet, replacing the 4 resigning ministers. He appointed Jack Sargeant to the role of Minister for Social Partnership, with the previous holder Sarah Murphy to take the role of Minister for Mental Health and Early Years. Jayne Bryant, the previous Mental Health and Early Years Minister, was made Cabinet Secretary for Local Government and Housing, replacing Julie James. Responsibility for the Economy was given to Ken Skates, responsibility for the Welsh Language was granted to Eluned Morgan, and the brief for Culture and Social Justice was added to the roles of Jane Hutt. Gething himself took the role of Counsel General.

== Cabinets ==
=== March - July 2024 ===
==== Cabinet Secretaries ====
Portfolio	Name	Constituency	Party	Term
First Minister of Wales	Vaughan Gething MS	Cardiff South and Penarth	Labour	March 2024 - (Note: Gething has resigned but will remain in the role until a new First Minister has been appointed)
Cabinet Secretary for Finance, Constitution and Cabinet Office	Rebecca Evans MS	Gower	Labour	March 2024 –
Cabinet Secretary for Housing, Local Government, and Planning	Julie James MS	Swansea West	Labour	March 2024 - July 2024
Cabinet Secretary for Health and Social Care	The Baroness Morgan of Ely MS	Mid & West Wales	Labour	March 2024 -
Cabinet Secretary for Economy, Energy and Welsh Language	Jeremy Miles MS	Neath	Labour	March 2024 - July 2024
Cabinet Secretary for North Wales and Transport	Ken Skates MS	Clwyd South	Labour	March 2024 –
Cabinet Secretary for Climate Change and Rural Affairs	Huw Irranca-Davies MS	Ogmore	Labour	March 2024 –
Trefnydd (House Leader) and Chief Whip	Jane Hutt MS	Vale of Glamorgan	Labour	March 2024 –
Cabinet Secretary for Culture and Social Justice	Lesley Griffiths MS	Wrexham	Labour	March 2024 – July 2024
Cabinet Secretary for Education	Lynne Neagle MS	Torfaen	Labour	March 2024 –

==== Ministers ====
Portfolio	Name	Constituency	Party	Term
Counsel General	Mick Antoniw MS	Pontypridd	Labour	2021– July 2024
Minister for Mental Health and Early Years	Jayne Bryant MS	Newport West	Labour	March 2024 - July 2024
Minister for Social Care	Dawn Bowden MS	Merthyr Tydfil and Rhymney	Labour	March 2024 - July 2024
Minister for Social Partnership	Hannah Blythyn MS	Delyn	Labour	March – May 2024
Minister for Social Partnership	Sarah Murphy MS	Bridgend	Labour	May 2024 – July 2024

==== Changes ====
- Sarah Murphy replaced Hannah Blythyn as Minister for Social Partnership in May 2024.

=== July 2024 - ===
==== Cabinet Secretaries ====
Portfolio	Name	Constituency	Party	Term
First Minister of Wales	Vaughan Gething MS	Cardiff South and Penarth	Labour	March 2024 -
Counsel General	Vaughan Gething MS	Cardiff South and Penarth	Labour	July 2024 -
Cabinet Secretary for Finance, Constitution and Cabinet Office	Rebecca Evans MS	Gower	Labour	March 2024–
Cabinet Secretary for Housing, Local Government, and Planning	Jayne Bryant MS	Newport West	Labour	July 2024 -
Cabinet Secretary for Health and Social Care and the Welsh Language	The Baroness Morgan of Ely MS	Mid & West Wales	Labour	March 2024 –
Cabinet Secretary for Economy, Transport and North Wales	Ken Skates MS	Clwyd South	Labour	July 2024 –
Cabinet Secretary for Climate Change and Rural Affairs	Huw Irranca-Davies MS	Ogmore	Labour	March 2024 -
Trefnydd (House Leader) and Chief Whip	Jane Hutt MS	Vale of Glamorgan	Labour	March 2024 -
Cabinet Secretary for Culture and Social Justice	Jane Hutt MS	Vale of Glamorgan	Labour	July 2024 -
Cabinet Secretary for Education	Lynne Neagle MS	Torfaen	Labour	March 2024 –

==== Ministers ====
Portfolio	Name	Constituency	Party	Term
Minister for Mental Health and Early Years	Sarah Murphy MS	Bridgend	Labour	July 2024 –
Minister for Social Care	Dawn Bowden MS	Merthyr Tydfil and Rhymney	Labour	March 2024 –
Minister for Social Partnership	Jack Sargeant MS	Alyn and Deeside	Labour	May 2024 –

== See also ==
- Shadow Cabinet (Wales)
- Members of the 6th Senedd
