= Leader of the Opposition (United Kingdom) =

Politician who leads the UK official opposition

Leader of His Majesty's Most Loyal Opposition
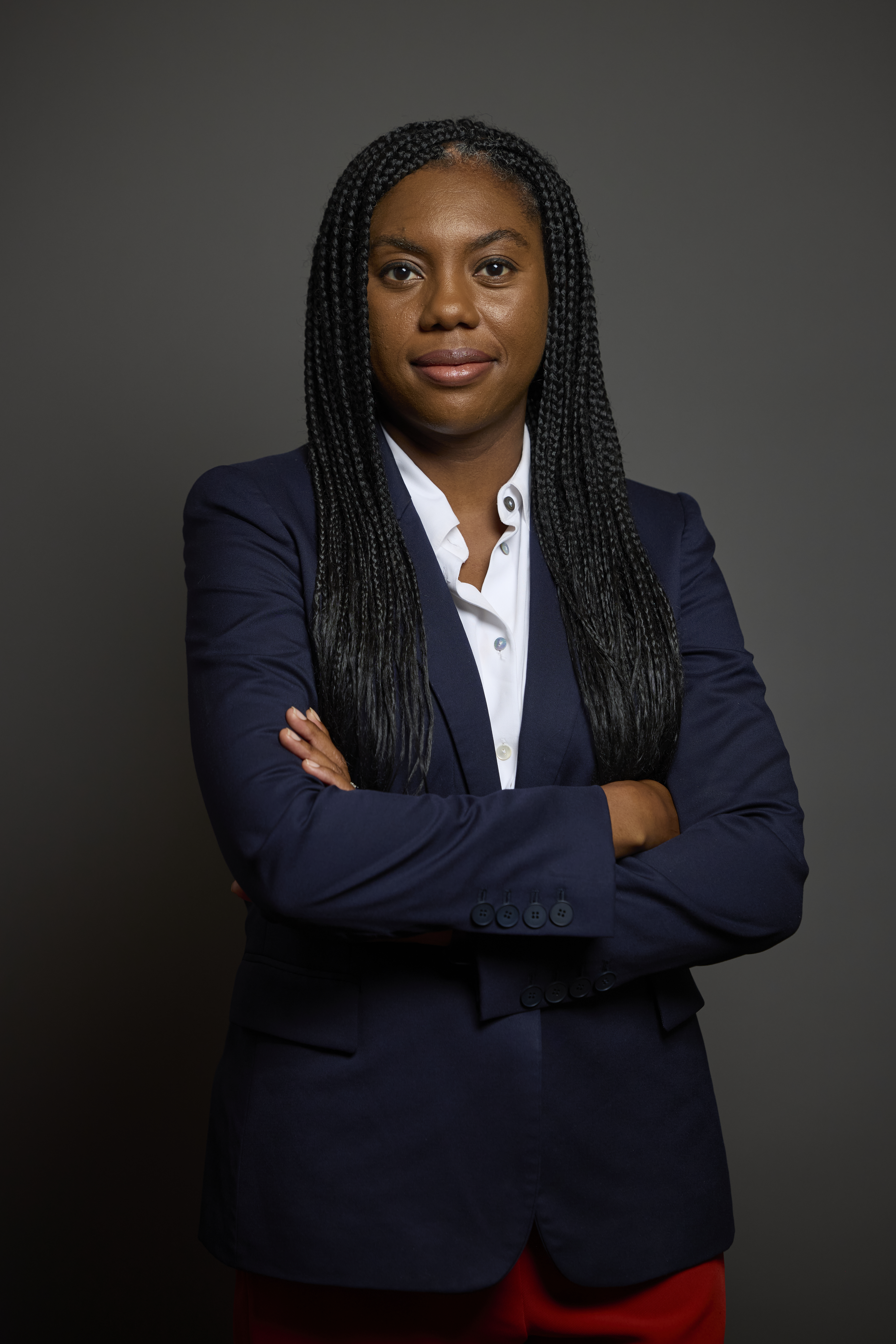
- Incumbent; Kemi Badenoch since 2 November 2024
- Official Opposition; Parliament of the United Kingdom; Leader of the Opposition's Office
- Style: Leader of the Opposition (informal); The Right Honourable (formal)
- Member of: House of Commons; Shadow Cabinet; Privy Council
- Appointer: Largest political party in the House of Commons that is not in government
- Term length: While leader of the largest political party in the House of Commons that is not in government
- Inaugural holder: The Lord Grenville
- Formation: March 1807; 1 July 1937 (Statutory)
- Deputy: Deputy Leader of the Opposition
- Salary: £144,649 (including £91,346 MP salary)
- Website: His Majesty's Official Opposition: The Shadow Cabinet

The Leader of His Majesty's Most Loyal Opposition, more commonly referred to as the Leader of the Opposition, is the person who leads the Official Opposition in the United Kingdom. The position is seen as the shadow head of government of the United Kingdom and thus the shadow prime minister of the United Kingdom.

Originally by convention, the Leader of the Opposition is the leader of the largest political party in the House of Commons of the United Kingdom that is not in government. When a single party wins outright, this is the party leader of the second-largest political party in the House of Commons. The role has since been codified by statute.

The Leader of the Opposition is often viewed as an alternative or shadow prime minister, and is appointed to the Privy Council (if not already appointed as a member). They lead an Official Opposition Shadow Cabinet, which scrutinises the actions of the Cabinet and offers alternative policies to those of the party in government.

In the nineteenth century, party affiliations were generally less fixed and the leaders in the two Houses were often of equal status. A single and clear Leader of the Opposition was only definitively settled if the opposition leader in the House of Commons or House of Lords was the outgoing prime minister. However, since the Parliament Act 1911, there has been no dispute that the leader in the House of Commons is pre-eminent and has always held the primary title. The Leader of the Opposition is entitled to a salary in addition to their salary as a Member of Parliament. In 2019, this additional entitlement was available up to £65,181.

The role is considered by those who have held it as the worst and most difficult job in politics, with Prime Minister Tony Blair and then-Leader of the Opposition William Hague agreeing that the opposition role was the harder job of the two positions.

The Incumbent Leader of the Opposition is Kemi Badenoch, appointed on 2 November 2024 as the Leader of the Conservative Party, succeeding to the Leader of the Opposition position following the 2024 Conservative Party leadership election.

== Leaders of the opposition from 1807 ==
The first modern Leader of the Opposition was Charles James Fox, who led the Whigs as such for a generation, except during the Fox–North Coalition in 1783. He finally rejoined the government in the Ministry of All the Talents formed in 1806 and died later that year.

=== Early developments 1807–1830 ===
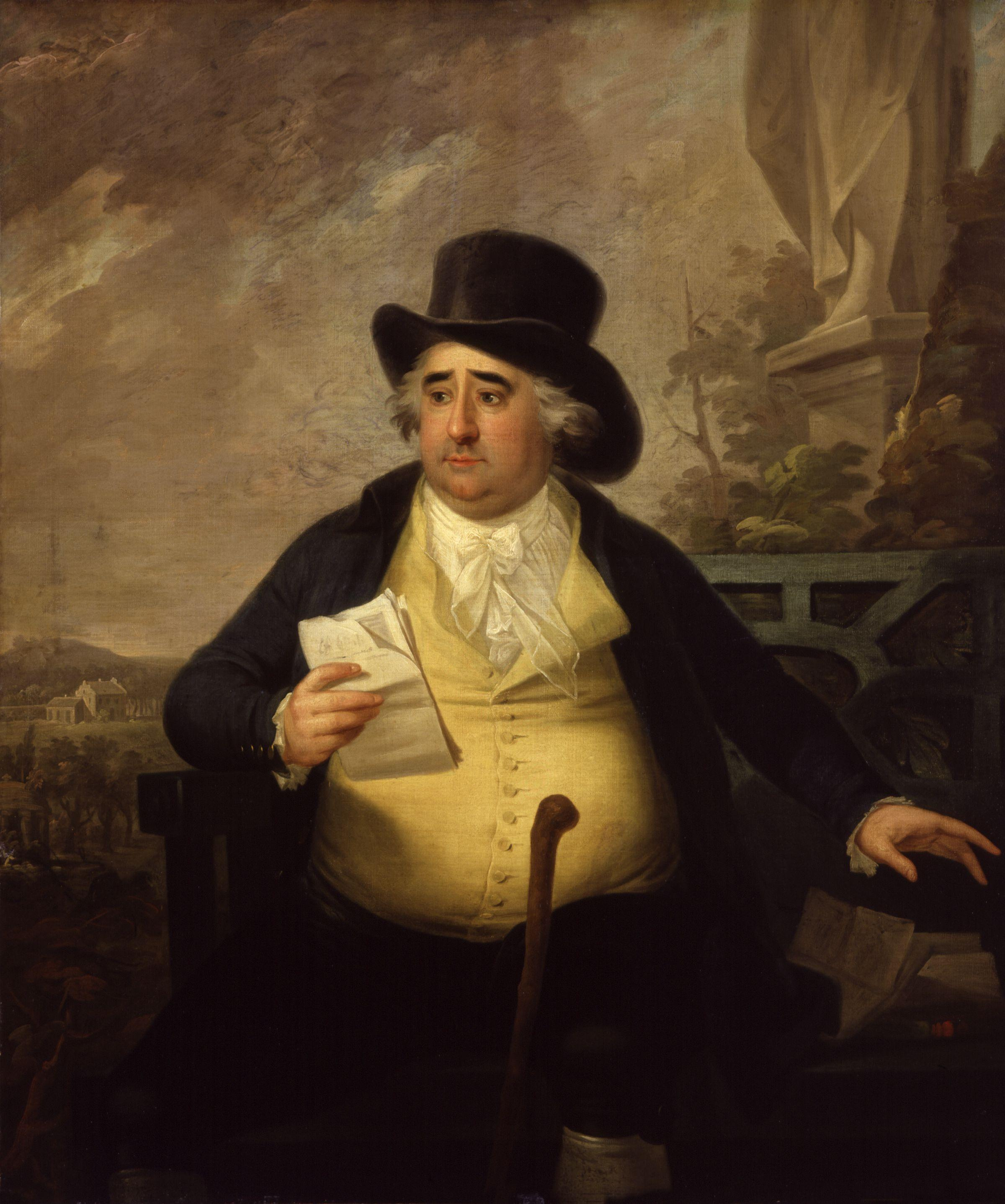
Charles James Fox, Leader of the Opposition 1783–1806

For there to be a recognised Leader of the Opposition, it is necessary for there to be a sufficiently cohesive opposition to need a formal leader. The emergence of the office thus coincided with the period when wholly united parties (Whig and Tory, governments and oppositions) became the norm. This situation was normalized in the Parliament of 1807–1812 when the members of the Grenvillite and Foxite Whig factions resolved to maintain a joint, dual-house leadership for the whole party.

The Ministry of all the Talents, in which both Whig factions participated, fell at the 1807 general election, during which the Whigs had re-adopted traditional factions, forming an opposition. The prime minister of the Talents ministry, Lord Grenville, had led his eponymous faction from the House of Lords. Meanwhile, the government leader of the House of Commons, Viscount Howick (later known as Earl Grey and the political heir of Charles James Fox who had died in 1806), led his faction, the Foxite whigs, from the House of Commons.

Howick's father, the 1st Earl Grey, died on 14 November 1807. As such the new Earl Grey vacated his seat in the House of Commons and moved to the House of Lords. This left no obvious Whig leader in the House of Commons.

Grenville's article in the Oxford Dictionary of National Biography confirms that he was considered the Whig leader in the House of Lords between 1807 and 1817, despite Grey leading the larger faction.

Political historian Archibald Foord describes Grenville and Grey as being "duumvirs of the party from 1807 to 1817" and consulted about what was to be done. Grenville was at first reluctant to name a leader of the opposition in the House of Commons, commenting "all the elections in the world would not have made Windham or Sheridan leaders of the old Opposition while Fox was alive".

Eventually, they jointly recommended George Ponsonby to the Whig MPs, whom they accepted as the first leader of the opposition in the House of Commons. Ponsonby, an Irish lawyer who was the uncle of Grey's wife, had been Lord Chancellor of Ireland during the Ministry of all the Talents and had only just been re-elected to the House of Commons in 1808 when he became leader. Ponsonby proved a weak leader but as he could not be persuaded to resign and the duumvirs did not want to depose him, he remained in place until he died in 1817.

Lord Grenville retired from active politics in 1817, leaving Grey as the leader of the opposition in the House of Lords. Grey was not a former prime minister in 1817, unlike Grenville, so under the convention that developed later in the century he would have been in the theory of equal status to whoever was a leader in the other House. However, there was little doubt that if a Whig ministry was possible, Grey rather than the less distinguished Commons leaders would have been invited to form that government. In this respect Grey's position was like that of the Earl of Derby in the Protectionist Conservative opposition of the late 1840s and early 1850s.

Earl Grey witnessed a delay of about a year, until 1818, before a new leader of the opposition in the House of Commons was chosen. This was George Tierney who was reluctant to accept the leadership and had weak support from his party. On 18 May 1819, Tierney moved a motion in the Commons for a committee on the state of the nation. This motion was defeated by 357 to 178, a division involving the largest number of MPs until the debates over the Reform Bill in the early 1830s. Foord comments that "this defeat put an effective end to Tierney's leadership ... Tierney did not disclaim the leadership till 23 Jan. 1821 ..., but he had ceased to exercise its functions since the great defeat".

Between 1821 and 1830 the Whig Commons leadership was left vacant. The leadership in the House of Lords was not much more effective: in 1824 Grey retired from active leadership, asking the party to follow the Marquess of Lansdowne "as the person whom his friends were to look upon as their leader". Lansdowne disclaimed the title of leader, although in practice he performed the function.

Following the retirement of Lord Liverpool from the prime ministership in 1827, the party's political situation changed. Neither the Duke of Wellington nor Robert Peel agreed to serve under George Canning and they were followed by five other members of the former Cabinet as well as forty junior members of the previous government. The Tory Party was heavily split between the "High Tories" (or "Ultras", nicknamed after the contemporary party in Restoration France) and the moderates supporting Canning, often called 'Canningites'. As a result, Canning found it difficult to maintain a government and chose to invite a number of Whigs to join his Cabinet, including Lord Lansdowne. After Canning's death, Lord Goderich continued the coalition for a few more months. The principal opposition between April 1827 and January 1828 worked with these brief administrations, although Earl Grey and a section of the Whigs were also in opposition to the coalition government. It was during this period that the term "His Majesty's Opposition" for the Opposition was coined, by John Cam Hobhouse.

The Duke of Wellington formed a ministry in January 1828 and, as a direct effect of adopting in earnest the policy of Catholic emancipation, the opposition became composed of most Whigs, with many Canningites and some ultra-Tories. Lord Lansdowne, in the absence of any alternative, remained the leading figure in the Whig opposition.

In 1830 Grey returned to the front rank of politics. On 30 June 1830, he denounced the government in the House of Lords. He rapidly attracted the support of opponents of the ministry. The renewal of organized opposition was also bolstered earlier in the year by the election of a new leader of the opposition in the House of Commons, the heir of Earl Spencer, Viscount Althorp.

In November 1830 Grey was invited to form a government and resumed the formal leadership of the party; as such, Wellington and Peel became the leaders of the opposition in the two Houses from November 1830.

=== Leaders of the opposition 1830–1937 ===
In the period of 1830–1937, the normal expectation was that there would be two leading parties (often with smaller allied groups), of which one would form the government and the other the opposition. These parties were expected to have recognized leaders in the two Houses, so there was normally no problem in identifying who led the opposition in each House.

The constitutional convention developed in the nineteenth century was that if one of the leaders was the last prime minister of the party, then he would be considered the overall leader of his party. If that was not the case then the leaders of both Houses were of equal status. As the monarch retained some discretion as to which leader should be invited to form a ministry, it was not always obvious in advance which one would be called upon to do so. However, as the leadership of the opposition only existed by custom, the normal expectations and conventions were modified by political realities from time to time.

From 1830 until 1846 the Conservative Party (formerly known as the Tory Party) and the Whig Party (increasingly often described with its Radical and other allies as the Liberal Party) alternated in power and provided clear leaders of the opposition.

In 1846 the Conservative Party split into (Protectionist) Conservative and Peelite (or Liberal Conservative) factions. The Protectionists being the larger group, the recognized leaders of the opposition were drawn from their ranks. In the House of Lords, Lord Stanley (soon becoming Earl of Derby) was the Protectionist leader. He was the only established front-rank political figure in the faction and thus a very strong candidate to form the next Conservative ministry.

The leadership in the House of Commons was more problematic. Lord George Bentinck, the leader of the Protectionist revolt against Sir Robert Peel, initially led the party in the Commons. He resigned in December 1847. The party was then faced with the problem of how to produce a credible leader. The first attempt to square the circle was made in February 1848, when the young Marquess of Granby was installed as the leader. He gave up the post in March 1848. The leadership then fell vacant until February 1849.

The next experiment was to entrust the leadership to a triumvirate of Granby, Disraeli, and the elderly John Charles Herries. In practice, Disraeli ignored his co-triumvirs. In 1851 Granby resigned and the party accepted Disraeli as the sole leader. The Protectionists by then were clearly the core of the Conservative Party and Derby was able to form his first government in 1852.

The Liberal Party was formally founded in 1859, replacing the Whig Party as one of the two leading parties. With increasing party discipline it became easier to define the principal opposition party and the leaders of the opposition.

The last overall leader of the opposition to have led it from the House of Lords was the Earl of Rosebery. He resigned as such in November 1896. Lord Rosebery had been Liberal prime minister from 1894 to 1895.

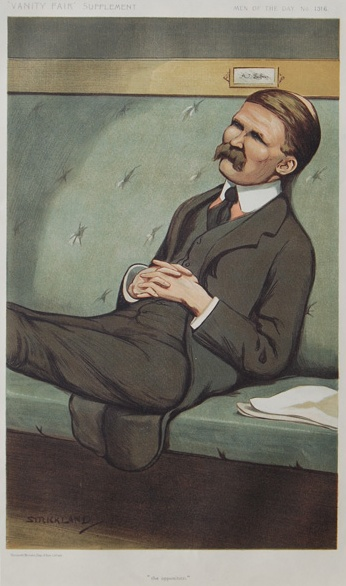
"The opposition": Bonar Law as caricatured in Vanity Fair, April 1912

The Parliament Act 1911 removed the legislative veto from the House of Lords to permit the welfare-state forming Liberal legislation, the People's Budget, and any future money bills to be enacted by the Commons without any input from the Lords. This, therefore, entrenched the de facto position that there could only be one true leader of the opposition and in effect clarified in which house that leader would need to sit. From this point, all leaders of the opposition in the House of Commons would thus be overall leaders of the opposition.

In 1915 the Liberal, Conservative and Labour parties formed a wartime coalition. The Irish Parliamentary Party did not join the government but were by and large not in opposition to it (seeking change through constitutional means, they were not responsible for the 1916 Easter Rising). As almost nobody in the Parliament could be said to be in opposition to the coalition, the leadership of the opposition in both Houses fell vacant.

Sir Edward Carson, the leading figure among the Irish Unionist Alliance (who were previously allied with the Conservatives, though not a part of the Conservative and Unionist Party which did not exist until the Tories merged with the Scottish Unionist Party in 1965), resigned from the coalition ministry on 19 October 1915. He then became the leader of those Irish Unionists who were not members of the government, effectively the leader of the opposition in the Commons.

The party situation changed in December 1916: a leading Liberal, David Lloyd George, formed a coalition with the support of a section of "Coalition Liberal", Conservative and Labour parties. The Leader of the Liberal Party, H. H. Asquith, and most of his leading colleagues left the government and took up seats on the opposition side of the House of Commons. Asquith was recognized as the leader of the opposition. He retained that post until he was defeated in the 1918 United Kingdom general election. Although Asquith continued to be the leader of the Liberal Party, as he was not a member of the House of Commons he was not eligible to be the leader of the opposition until returned in the 1920 Paisley by-election.

The Parliament elected in December 1918 which sat from 1919 until 1922 represents the most significant deviation from the principle that the leader of the opposition is the leader of the party not in government with the greatest numerical support in the House of Commons. The largest opposition party (disregarding Sinn Féin, whose abstentionist MPs did not take their seats at Westminster) was the Labour Party, which had wholly left the Lloyd George coalition and won 57 seats at the general election. Thirty-six Liberals had been elected without coalition support; however, they were mixed in their opposition to Lloyd George. The Labour Party did not have a leader until 1922. The Parliamentary Labour Party annually elected a chairman, but the party, due to its congressional origins, refused to assert a claim that the chairman was the leader of the opposition. Although the issue of who was entitled to be the leader of the opposition was never formally resolved, in practice the Opposition Liberal leader performed most of the parliamentary functions associated with the office.

The small group of opposition Liberals met in 1919, distanced by his coalition's protectionism and nationalization. They resolved that they were the Liberal Parliamentary Party. They elected Sir Donald Maclean as Chairman of the Parliamentary Party. Liberal Party practice at the time, when the overall leader of the party had lost an election to the House of Commons, was for the chairman to function as acting leader in the House. Maclean, therefore, took on the role of leader of the opposition, followed by Asquith, who returned to the House by winning a by-election (1920–1922).

From 1922 the Labour Party had a recognized leader so took over all remaining commons opposition roles from the Opposition Liberal Party. Since 1922 the principal Government and Opposition parties have been the Labour Party and the Conservative Party. There were three instances of peers being seriously considered for the prime ministership during the twentieth century (Lord Curzon of Kedleston in 1923, Lord Halifax in 1940, and Alec Douglas-Home in 1963), but these were all cases where the Conservative Party was in government and do not affect the list of leaders of the opposition.

In 1931–32 the Leader of the Labour Party was Arthur Henderson. He was the leader of the opposition for a short period in 1931, but was ineligible to continue when he lost his seat in the 1931 general election. George Lansbury was the leader of the opposition before he also became the leader of the Labour Party in 1932.

=== Statutory leaders of the opposition from 1937 ===
Leaders of the opposition in the two Houses of Parliament had been generally recognized and given a special status in Parliament for more than a century before they were mentioned in legislation.

Erskine May: Parliamentary Practice confirms that the office of the leader of the opposition was first given statutory recognition in the Ministers of the Crown Act 1937.

- Section 5 stated that "There shall be paid to the Leader of the Opposition an annual salary of two thousand pounds".
- Section 10(1) included a definition (which codifies the usual situation under the previous custom): "'Leader of the Opposition' means that member of the House of Commons who is for the time being the Leader in that House of the party in opposition to His Majesty's Government having the greatest numerical strength in that House".
- The 1937 Act also contains an important provision to decide who is the Leader of the Opposition, if this is in doubt. Under section 10(3), "If any doubt arises as to which is or was at any material time the party in opposition to His Majesty's Government having the greatest numerical strength in the House of Commons, or as to who is or was at any material time the leader in that House of such a party, the question shall be decided for the purposes of this Act by the Speaker of the House of Commons, and his decision, certified in writing under his hand, shall be final and conclusive."

Subsequent legislation also gave statutory recognition to the leader of the opposition in the House of Lords.

- Section 2(1) of the Ministerial and other Salaries Act 1975 provides that "In this Act 'Leader of the Opposition' means, in relation to either House of Parliament, that member of that House who is for the time being the Leader in that House of the party in opposition to His Majesty's Government having the greatest numerical strength in the House of Commons".
- Section 2(2) is in exactly the same terms as section 10(3) of the 1937 Act.
- Section 2(3) is a corresponding provision for the Lord Chancellor (since 2005, the Lord Speaker) to decide about the Leader of the Opposition in the House of Lords.

The legislative provisions confirm that the leader of the opposition is, strictly, a Parliamentary office; so that to be a leader a person must be a member of the House of Commons or House of Lords.

Since 1937 the leader of the opposition has received a state salary in addition to their salary as a Member of Parliament (MP), now equivalent to a Cabinet minister. The holder also receives a chauffeur-driven car for official business of equivalent cost and specification to the vehicles used by most Cabinet ministers.

In 1940 the three largest parties in the House of Commons formed a coalition government to continue to prosecute the Second World War. This coalition continued in office until shortly after the defeat of Nazi Germany in 1945. As the former leader of the opposition had joined the government the issue arose of who was to hold the office or perform its functions. Keesing's Contemporary Archives 1937–1940 (at paragraph 4069D) reported the situation, based on Hansard:

The Prime Minister replying to Mr. Denman in the House of Commons on 21 May, said that in view of the formation of an Administration embracing the three main political parties, H.M. Government was of the opinion that the provision of the Ministers of the Crown Act, 1937, relating to the payment of a salary to the leader of the opposition was in abeyance for the time being, as there was no alternative party capable of forming a Government. He added that he did not consider amending legislation necessary.

The Daily Herald reported that the Parliamentary Labour Party met on 22 May 1940 and unanimously elected Dr H. B. Lees-Smith as Chairman of the PLP (an office normally held by the party leader at that time) and as spokesman of the Party from the opposition front bench.

After the death of Lees-Smith, on 18 December 1941, the PLP, with Patrick McFadden acting as chairman, held a meeting on 21 January 1942. Frederick Pethick-Lawrence was unanimously elected Chairman of the PLP and the official spokesman of the party in the House of Commons while the party leader was serving in the government. After the Deputy Leader of the Labour Party (Arthur Greenwood) left the government on 22 February 1942 he took over these roles from Pethick-Lawrence until the end of the coalition and the resumption of normal party politics.

== List of leaders of the opposition (1807–1911) ==
The table lists the people who were, or who acted as, leaders of the opposition in the two Houses of Parliament since 1807, prior to which the post was held by Charles James Fox for decades.

The leaders of the two Houses were of equal status, before 1911, unless one was the most recent Prime Minister for the party. Such a former prime minister was considered to be the overall leader of the opposition. From 1911 the Leader of the Opposition in the House of Commons was considered to be the overall Leader of the Opposition. Overall leaders names are bolded. Acting leaders names are in italics unless the acting leader subsequently became a full leader during a continuous period as leader.

Due to the fragmentation of both principal parties in 1827–1830, the leaders and principal opposition parties suggested for those years are provisional.

| Principal party of opposition | Leader of the Opposition House of Commons | Leader of the Opposition House of Lords | Date |
|---|---|---|---|
| Whig | Viscount Howick (Note: Subsequently Prime Minister) | **The Lord Grenville** (Note: Formerly Prime Minister) | May 1807 |
| Whig | Vacant | **The Lord Grenville** | 14 November 1807 |
| Whig | George Ponsonby (Note: Died in office) | **The Lord Grenville** | 1808 |
| Whig | Vacant | **The Lord Grenville** | 8 July 1817 |
| Whig | Vacant | The Earl Grey (formerly Viscount Howick) | 1817 |
| Whig | George Tierney | The Earl Grey (formerly Viscount Howick) | 1818 |
| Whig | Vacant | The Earl Grey (formerly Viscount Howick) | 23 January 1821 |
| Whig | Vacant | The Marquess of Lansdowne (Note: Foord suggests that Lansdowne was, in effect, Acting Whig Leader in 1824–1827. This may possibly have also been the case in 1828–1830. Grey's article in the Oxford Dictionary of National Biography suggests "though he called on Lansdowne to take up the leadership of the opposition he was still unwilling to give it up altogether". Grey was in opposition in 1827–28, when Lansdowne was in government. Given the confusion of the politics of the period, particularly after 1827 when both principal parties were fragmented, it is possible that Grey should be considered Leader of the Opposition 1824–1830. However, the definite statements (by Foord) that Grey resigned the leadership in 1824 and (by Cook & Keith) that Grey did not resume the leadership until November 1830 lead to a different conclusion.) | 1824 |
| Tory | Sir Robert Peel | **The Duke of Wellington** (Note: Formerly and subsequently Prime Minister) | April 1827 |
| Whig | Vacant | The Marquess of Lansdowne | January 1828 |
| Whig | Viscount Althorp | The Marquess of Lansdowne | February 1830 |
| Tory | Sir Robert Peel | **The Duke of Wellington** | November 1830 |
| Whig | Lord John Russell | **The Viscount Melbourne** | November 1834 |
| Conservative | **Sir Robert Peel** | The Duke of Wellington | April 1835 |
| Whig | Lord John Russell | **The Viscount Melbourne** | August 1841 |
| Whig | Lord John Russell | The Marquess of Lansdowne | October 1842 |
| Protectionist Conservative | Lord George Bentinck | The Lord Stanley of Bickerstaffe (The Earl of Derby from 1851) | June 1846 |
| Protectionist Conservative | Marquess of Granby | The Lord Stanley of Bickerstaffe (The Earl of Derby from 1851) | 10 February 1848 |
| Protectionist Conservative | Vacant | The Lord Stanley of Bickerstaffe (The Earl of Derby from 1851) | 4 March 1848 |
| Protectionist Conservative | Marquess of Granby; John Charles Herries; and Benjamin Disraeli | The Lord Stanley of Bickerstaffe (The Earl of Derby from 1851) | February 1849 |
| Protectionist Conservative | Benjamin Disraeli | The Lord Stanley of Bickerstaffe (The Earl of Derby from 1851) | 1851 |
| Whig | **Lord John Russell** | The Marquess of Lansdowne | February 1852 |
| Conservative | Benjamin Disraeli | **The Earl of Derby** | December 1852 |
| Whig | **The Viscount Palmerston** (Note: An alternative interpretation is that Palmerston (the immediate past Prime Minister) and Lord John Russell (a previous Prime Minister) were joint leaders. Cook & Keith have Palmerston as the sole leader.) | The Earl Granville | February 1858 |
| Conservative | Benjamin Disraeli | **The Earl of Derby** | June 1859 |
| Liberal | William Ewart Gladstone | **The Earl Russell** (formerly Lord John Russell) | June 1866 |
| Liberal | William Ewart Gladstone | The Earl Granville | December 1868 |
| Conservative | **Benjamin Disraeli** | The Earl of Malmesbury | December 1868 |
| Conservative | **Benjamin Disraeli** | The Lord Cairns | February 1869 |
| Conservative | **Benjamin Disraeli** | The Duke of Richmond | February 1870 |
| Liberal | **William Ewart Gladstone** | The Earl Granville | February 1874 |
| Liberal | **Marquess of Hartington** | The Earl Granville | February 1875 |
| Conservative | Sir Stafford Northcote | **The Earl of Beaconsfield** (formerly Benjamin Disraeli) | April 1880 |
| Conservative | Sir Stafford Northcote | The Marquess of Salisbury | May 1881 |
| Liberal | **William Ewart Gladstone** | The Earl Granville | June 1885 |
| Conservative | Sir Michael Hicks Beach | **The Marquess of Salisbury** | February 1886 |
| Liberal | **William Ewart Gladstone** | The Earl Granville | July 1886 |
| Liberal | **William Ewart Gladstone** | The Earl of Kimberley | April 1891 |
| Conservative | Arthur Balfour | **The Marquess of Salisbury** | August 1892 |
| Liberal | Sir William Harcourt (Note: Harcourt resigned on 14 December 1898.) | **The Earl of Rosebery** (Note: Rosebery resigned on 6 October 1896.) | June 1895 |
| Liberal | Sir William Harcourt | The Earl of Kimberley | January 1897 |
| Liberal | **Sir Henry Campbell-Bannerman** | The Earl of Kimberley | 6 February 1899 |
| Liberal | **Sir Henry Campbell-Bannerman** | The Earl Spencer | 1902 |
| Liberal | **Sir Henry Campbell-Bannerman** | The Marquess of Ripon | 1905 |
| Conservative | **Arthur Balfour** (Note: Balfour lost his seat in the House of Commons in January 1906.) | The Marquess of Lansdowne (Liberal Unionist Party until 1912) | 5 December 1905 |
| Conservative | Joseph Chamberlain (Liberal Unionist Party) | The Marquess of Lansdowne (Liberal Unionist Party until 1912) | 8 February 1906 |
| Conservative | **Arthur Balfour** | The Marquess of Lansdowne (Liberal Unionist Party until 1912) | 27 February 1906 |
| Conservative | Bonar Law | The Marquess of Lansdowne (Liberal Unionist Party until 1912) | 13 November 1911 |

== List of leaders of the opposition (1911–present) ==
- Labour (21)
- Conservative (12)
- Liberal (3)
- Irish Unionist (1)

List of leaders of the opposition since the Parliament Act
| Portrait | Leader of the Opposition | Term of office | | | Party | Shadow cabinet |
| Portrait | Leader of the Opposition | Start | End | Duration | Party | Shadow cabinet |
|---|---|---|---|---|---|---|
| | Bonar Law | 13 November 1911 | 25 May 1915 | 3 years, 194 days | Conservative (Scot.U.) | |
| | Sir Edward Carson (Note: During Asquith's coalition government of 1915–1916, there was no formal opposition in either the Commons or the Lords. The only party not in Asquith's Liberal–Conservative–Labour coalition was the Irish Parliamentary Party led by John Redmond. However, this party supported the government and did not function as an Opposition. Sir Edward Carson, the leading figure amongst the Irish Unionist allies of the Conservative Party, resigned from the coalition ministry on 19 October 1915. He then became the de facto leader of those Unionists who were not members of the government, effectively Leader of the Opposition in the Commons.) | 19 October 1915 | 6 December 1916 | 1 year, 49 days | Irish Unionist | |
| | H. H. Asquith (Note: Asquith lost his seat in the House of Commons in December 1918.) | 6 December 1916 | 14 December 1918 | 2 years, 9 days | Liberal | |
| | Sir Donald Maclean (Note: Douglas in The History of the Liberal Party 1895–1970 observes that "The technical question whether the Leader of the Opposition was Maclean or William Adamson, Chairman of the Parliamentary Labour Party, was never fully resolved ... The fact that Adamson did not press his claim for Opposition leadership is of more than technical interest, for it shows that the Labour Party was still not taking itself seriously as a likely alternative government".) | 9 January 1919 | 25 February 1920 | 1 year, 48 days | Liberal | |
| | H. H. Asquith | 25 February 1920 | 21 November 1922 | 2 years, 270 days | Liberal | |
| | Ramsay MacDonald | 21 November 1922 | 22 January 1924 | 1 year, 63 days | Labour | |
| | Stanley Baldwin | 22 January 1924 | 4 November 1924 | 288 days | Conservative | |
| | Ramsay MacDonald | 4 November 1924 | 5 June 1929 | 4 years, 214 days | Labour | |
| | Stanley Baldwin | 5 June 1929 | 24 August 1931 | 2 years, 81 days | Conservative | |
| | Arthur Henderson (Note: Henderson lost his seat in the House of Commons on 27 October 1931.) | 1 September 1931 | 27 October 1931 | 57 days | Labour | |
| | George Lansbury (Note: Lansbury was acting as Labour leader, in the absence from the House of Commons of Henderson, in 1931–1932, before becoming party leader himself in 1932.) | 5 November 1931 | 8 October 1935 | 3 years, 338 days | Labour | |
| | Clement Attlee (Note: Attlee was acting as leader after the resignation of Lansbury on 25 October 1935, before being elected party leader himself on 3 December 1935.) | 8 October 1935 | 11 May 1940 | 4 years, 217 days | Labour | |
| | Hastings Lees-Smith (Note: During World War II a succession of three Labour politicians acted as Leader of the Opposition for the purpose of allowing the House of Commons to function normally; however, as in the mid-World War I ministry, opposition did not run under a party-whipped system. As the Government between 1940 and 1945 was a coalition government in which Labour politicians functioned fully as members of the Government, neither Deputy Prime Minister Clement Attlee nor these three received the salary for the post of Leader of the Opposition. The largest party that opposed the war and was not part of the coalition – and therefore, in theory, the opposition – was the Independent Labour Party, led by James Maxton. With only three MPs, it tried to take over the opposition front bench, but was widely opposed in this venture.) | 22 May 1940 | 18 December 1941 | 1 year, 211 days | Labour | |
| | Frederick Pethick-Lawrence | 21 January 1942 | 22 February 1942 | 33 days | Labour | |
| | Arthur Greenwood | 22 February 1942 | 23 May 1945 | 3 years, 91 days | Labour | |
| | Clement Attlee | 23 May 1945 | 26 July 1945 | 65 days | Labour | |
| | Winston Churchill | 26 July 1945 | 26 October 1951 | 6 years, 93 days | Conservative | |
| | Clement Attlee | 26 October 1951 | 25 November 1955 | 4 years, 31 days | Labour | Attlee II |
| | Herbert Morrison (Note: Commonly referred to as the acting leader. Following the death or immediate resignation of the leader, the deputy leader, according to the Labour Party Rule Book, is the leader on a pro tem basis until the next leader is selected. Before 1981 the leader, in opposition, was elected annually by the parliamentary Labour Party. From 1981 to 2010, the leader was elected by an electoral college of party members, MPs and MEPs, as well as trade unions, before the party switched to a true one member, one vote system in 2015.) | 25 November 1955 | 14 December 1955 | 20 days | Labour | Attlee II |
| | Hugh Gaitskell | 14 December 1955 | 18 January 1963 | 7 years, 36 days | Labour | Gaitskell |
| | George Brown | 18 January 1963 | 14 February 1963 | 28 days | Labour | Brown |
| | Harold Wilson | 14 February 1963 | 16 October 1964 | 1 year, 246 days | Labour | Wilson I |
| | Alec Douglas-Home | 16 October 1964 | 28 July 1965 | 286 days | Conservative (Scot.U.) | Douglas-Home |
| | Edward Heath | 28 July 1965 | 19 June 1970 | 4 years, 327 days | Conservative | Heath I |
| | Harold Wilson | 19 June 1970 | 4 March 1974 | 3 years, 259 days | Labour | Wilson II |
| | Edward Heath | 4 March 1974 | 11 February 1975 | 345 days | Conservative | Heath II |
| | Margaret Thatcher | 11 February 1975 | 4 May 1979 | 4 years, 83 days | Conservative | Thatcher |
| | James Callaghan | 4 May 1979 | 10 November 1980 | 1 year, 191 days | Labour | Callaghan |
| | Michael Foot | 10 November 1980 | 2 October 1983 | 2 years, 327 days | Labour | Foot |
| | Neil Kinnock | 2 October 1983 | 18 July 1992 | 8 years, 291 days | Labour | Kinnock |
| | John Smith | 18 July 1992 | 12 May 1994 | 1 year, 299 days | Labour | Smith |
| | Margaret Beckett | 12 May 1994 | 21 July 1994 | 71 days | Labour | Beckett |
| | Tony Blair | 21 July 1994 | 2 May 1997 | 2 years, 286 days | Labour | Blair |
| | John Major | 2 May 1997 | 19 June 1997 | 49 days | Conservative | Major |
| | William Hague | 19 June 1997 | 13 September 2001 | 4 years, 87 days | Conservative | Hague |
| | Iain Duncan Smith | 13 September 2001 | 6 November 2003 | 2 years, 55 days | Conservative | Duncan Smith |
| | Michael Howard | 6 November 2003 | 6 December 2005 | 2 years, 31 days | Conservative | Howard |
| | David Cameron | 6 December 2005 | 11 May 2010 | 4 years, 157 days | Conservative | Cameron |
| | Harriet Harman | 11 May 2010 | 25 September 2010 | 138 days | Labour | Harman I |
| | Ed Miliband | 25 September 2010 | 8 May 2015 | 4 years, 226 days | Labour | Miliband |
| | Harriet Harman | 8 May 2015 | 12 September 2015 | 128 days | Labour | Harman II |
| | Jeremy Corbyn | 12 September 2015 | 4 April 2020 | 4 years, 206 days | Labour | Corbyn |
| | Keir Starmer; Tenure | 4 April 2020 | 5 July 2024 | 4 years, 93 days | Labour | Starmer |
| | Rishi Sunak | 5 July 2024 | 2 November 2024 | 121 days | Conservative | Sunak |
| | Kemi Badenoch | 2 November 2024 | Incumbent | 2 years, 7 days | Conservative | Badenoch |

== List of leaders of the opposition by total length of tenure ==
This list notes each Leader of the Opposition, from the Parliament Act 1911 granting legislative preeminence to the House of Commons, and the Ministers of the Crown Act 1937 the leader of the second largest faction within it a statutory title and salary, rather than the customary role as HM Official Opposition, in order of term length. This is based on the difference between dates; if counted by number of calendar days all the figures would be one greater.

Of the 37 leaders of the opposition listed, seven served more than 5 years, seven have lost more than one general election, and eight have served less than a year.

| Rank | Leader of Opposition | Length served | General elections won | General elections lost | Terms as Prime Minister | Party | Term(s) | Refs |
|---|---|---|---|---|---|---|---|---|
| 1 | Clement Attlee | 8 years, 313 days | 1945; 1950 | 1935; 1951 (Note: First place in vote share); 1955 | 2 | Labour | 1935–1940; 1945; 1951–1955 | |
| 2 | Neil Kinnock | 8 years, 291 days | 0 | 1987; 1992 | 0 | Labour | 1983–1992 | |
| 3 | Hugh Gaitskell | 7 years, 36 days | 0 | 1959 | 0 | Labour | 1955–1963 | |
| 4 | Winston Churchill | 6 years, 93 days | 1951 | 1945; 1950 | 2 | Conservative | 1945–1951 | |
| 5 | Edward Heath | 5 years, 307 days | 1970 | 1966; Feb 1974 (Note: Hung parliament with first place in vote share); Oct 1974 | 1 | Conservative | 1965–1970; 1974–1975 | |
| 6 | Ramsay MacDonald | 5 years, 277 days | 1923 (Note: Hung parliament with second place in vote share); 1929; 1931 (Note: Fifth place in vote share (Stanley Baldwin with first place vote share takes over mid-parliament)) | 1924 | 2 | Labour | 1922–1924; 1924–1929 | |
| 7 | Harold Wilson | 5 years, 140 days | 1964; 1966; Feb 1974; Oct 1974 | 1970 | 2 | Labour | 1963–1964; 1970–1974 | |
| 8 | H. H. Asquith | 4 years, 279 days | Jan 1910; Dec 1910 | 1918 | 1 | Liberal | 1916–1918; 1920–1922 | |
| 9 | Ed Miliband | 4 years, 226 days | 0 | 2015 | 0 | Labour | 2010–2015 | |
| 10 | Jeremy Corbyn | 4 years, 206 days | 0 | 2017; 2019 | 0 | Labour | 2015–2020 | |
| 11 | David Cameron | 4 years, 157 days | 2010; 2015 | 0 | 1 | Conservative | 2005–2010 | |
| 12 | Keir Starmer | 4 years, 93 days | 2024 | 0 | 1 | Labour | 2020–2024 | |
| 13 | William Hague | 4 years, 87 days | 0 | 2001 | 0 | Conservative | 1997–2001 | |
| 14 | Margaret Thatcher | 4 years, 83 days | 1979; 1983; 1987 | 0 | 1 | Conservative | 1975–1979 | |
| 15 | George Lansbury | 3 years, 338 days | — | — | 0 | Labour | 1931 | |
| 16 | Bonar Law | 3 years, 194 days | 0 | 1918 (Note: First place in vote share (Law took over mid-parliament from David Lloyd George)) | 1 | Unionist (Conservative) | 1911–1915 | |
| 17 | Arthur Greenwood | 3 years, 91 days | — | — | 0 | Labour | 1942–1945 | |
| 18 | Stanley Baldwin | 3 years, 2 days | 1924; 1931; 1935 | 1923; 1929 | 3 | Conservative | 1924; 1929–1931 | |
| 19 | Michael Foot | 2 years, 327 days | 0 | 1983 | 0 | Labour | 1980–1983 | |
| 20 | Tony Blair | 2 years, 286 days | 1997; 2001; 2005 | 0 | 1 | Labour | 1994–1997 | |
| 21 | Iain Duncan Smith | 2 years, 55 days | — | — | 0 | Conservative | 2001–2003 | |
| 22 | Michael Howard | 2 years, 31 days | 0 | 2005 | 0 | Conservative | 2003–2005 | |
| 23 | Kemi Badenoch | 2 years, 7 days (incumbent) | — | — | 0 | Conservative | 2024–present | |
| 24 | John Smith | 1 year, 299 days | — | — | 0 | Labour | 1992–1994 | |
| 25 | Hastings Lees-Smith | 1 year, 211 days | — | — | 0 | Labour | 1940–1941 | |
| 26 | James Callaghan | 1 year, 191 days | 0 | 1979 | 1 | Labour | 1979–1980 | |
| 27 | Edward Carson | 1 year, 49 days | — | — | 0 | Irish Unionist (Conservative) | 1915–1916 | |
| 28 | Donald Maclean | 1 year, 48 days | — | — | 0 | Liberal | 1919–1920 | |
| 29 | Alec Douglas-Home | 286 days | 0 | 1964 | 1 | Unionist (Conservative) | 1964–1965 | |
| 30 | Harriet Harman | 265 days | — | — | 0 | Labour | 2010; 2015 | |
| 31 | Rishi Sunak | 121 days | 0 | 2024 | 1 | Conservative | 2024 | |
| 32 | Margaret Beckett | 71 days | — | — | 0 | Labour | 1994 | |
| 33 | Arthur Henderson | 57 days | 0 | 1931 | 0 | Labour | 1931 | |
| 34 | John Major | 49 days | 1992 | 1997 | 1 | Conservative | 1997 | |
| 35 | Frederick Pethick-Lawrence | 33 days | — | — | 0 | Labour | 1942 | |
| 36 | George Brown | 28 days | — | — | 0 | Labour | 1963 | |
| 37 | Herbert Morrison | 18 days | — | — | 0 | Labour | 1955 | |

== See also ==
- Prime Minister of the United Kingdom
- Shadow Leader of the House of Lords
- Leader of the Opposition

== Bibliography ==
- British Historical Facts 1760–1830, by Chris Cook and John Stevenson (The Macmillan Press 1980)
- British Historical Facts 1830–1900, by Chris Cook and Brendan Keith (The Macmillan Press 1975)
- His Majesty's Opposition 1714–1830, by Archibald S. Foord (Oxford University Press and Clarendon Press, 1964)
- History of the Liberal Party 1895–1970, by Roy Douglas (Sidgwick & Jackson 1971)
- Oxford Dictionary of National Biography
- Twentieth Century British Political Facts 1900–2000, by David Butler and Gareth Butler (Macmillan Press; 8th edition, 2000)
