= Leaders of political parties in the United Kingdom =

This article lists the Leaders of political parties in the United Kingdom to provide insight into the politics of the United Kingdom. It contains details including which party the leader belongs to, the leader's seat, and which form of leadership that person holds.

== Leaders in the House of Commons ==
National party leaders are usually members of parliament. Some (including Welsh, Scottish and Northern Irish parties) designate a separate leader in the House of Commons, or their leader is absent from the House of Commons and holds membership of a devolved body.

Andy Burnham Leader of the Labour Party	Kemi Badenoch Leader of the Conservative Party

Leader	Party	Leader's seat	Number of seats	Leader since
Andy Burnham	Labour Party	Makerfield	403	17 July 2026
Kemi Badenoch	Conservative Party	North West Essex	118	2 November 2024
Ed Davey	Liberal Democrats	Kingston and Surbiton	71	27 August 2020
Dave Doogan^{[a]}	Scottish National Party	Angus and Perthshire Glens	8	12 May 2026
Nigel Farage^{[b]}	Reform UK		7	3 June 2024
N/A^{[c]}	Sinn Féin	N/A	7 ^{[c]}	
Gavin Robinson	Democratic Unionist Party	Belfast East	5	29 March 2024
Ellie Chowns^{[d]}	Green Party of England and Wales	North Herefordshire	5	4 September 2025
Liz Saville Roberts^{[e]}	Plaid Cymru	Dwyfor Meirionnydd	4	14 June 2017
Claire Hanna	Social Democratic and Labour Party	Belfast South and Mid Down	2	5 October 2024
Sorcha Eastwood	Alliance Party of Northern Ireland	Lagan Valley	1	4 July 2024
Rupert Lowe	Restore Britain	Great Yarmouth	1	13 February 2026
Robin Swann	Ulster Unionist Party	South Antrim	1	4 July 2024
Jim Allister	Traditional Unionist Voice	North Antrim	1	4 July 2024

^a Leads the party in the House of Commons. The leader of the Scottish National Party (SNP), John Swinney has been a Member of the Scottish Parliament (MSP) since 1999.
^b Farage is not currently a member of the House of Commmons. He is currently running in the 2026 Clacton by-election.
^c In accordance with the party's policy of abstentionism, no elected Sinn Féin members of parliament have ever sat in the House of Commons.
^d Leads the party in the House of Commons. The Green Party's leader, Zack Polanski, has sat as a member of the London Assembly since 2021.
^e Leads the party in the House of Commons. Plaid Cymru's leader, Rhun ap Iorwerth, has sat as a member of the Senedd (Welsh Parliament) for Ynys Môn since 2 August 2013.

== Leaders in the House of Lords ==
Leader	Party	Members	Leader since
Nicholas True, Baron True	Conservative Party	272	14 July 2016
Baroness Smith of Basildon	Labour Party	186	27 May 2015
The Lord Purvis of Tweed	Liberal Democrats	78	25 July 2025

== Leaders in the Scottish Parliament ==
Leader	Party	Leader's seat	Number of seats	Leader since
John Swinney	Scottish National Party	Perthshire North	58	8 May 2024
Michael Marra	Scottish Labour	North East Scotland (region)	17	19 September 2026
Malcolm Offord	Reform UK Scotland	West Scotland (region)	17	15 January 2026
Ross Greer	Scottish Greens	West Scotland (region)	15	29 August 2025
Gillian Mackay	Scottish Greens	Central Scotland (region)	15	29 August 2025
Russell Findlay	Scottish Conservatives	West Scotland (region)	12	27 September 2024
Alex Cole-Hamilton	Scottish Liberal Democrats	Edinburgh North Western	10	20 August 2021

== Leaders in the Senedd ==
Leader	Party	Leader's seat	Number of seats	Leader since
Rhun ap Iorwerth	Plaid Cymru – Party of Wales	Bangor Conwy Môn	43	16 June 2023
Helen Jenner	Reform UK Wales	Bangor Conwy Môn	34	15 September 2026
Ken Skates	Welsh Labour	Fflint Wrecsam	9	9 May 2026
Darren Millar	Welsh Conservatives	Clwyd	7	5 December 2024
Anthony Slaughter	Wales Green Party	Caerdydd Penarth	2	December 2018
Jane Dodds	Welsh Liberal Democrats	Brycheiniog Tawe Nedd	1	3 November 2017

== Leaders in the Northern Ireland Assembly ==
Leader	Party	Leader's seat	Number of seats	Leader since
Michelle O'Neill	Sinn Féin	Mid Ulster	27	23 January 2017
N/A^{[d]}	Democratic Unionist Party	Belfast East (as an MP)	25	29 March 2024
Naomi Long	Alliance Party of Northern Ireland	Belfast East	17	26 October 2016
Mike Nesbitt	Ulster Unionist Party	Strangford	9	28 September 2024
Matthew O'Toole	Social Democratic and Labour Party	Belfast South	8	13 May 2022
N/A^{[e]}	Traditional Unionist Voice	North Antrim (as an MP)	1	7 December 2007
Collective leadership	People Before Profit	N/A	1	N/A

^d The leader of the Democratic Unionist Party (DUP), Gavin Robinson has sat in the House of Commons as MP for Belfast East since 2015.
^e The leader of the Traditional Unionist Voice (TUV), Jim Allister was previously a North Antrim MLA until his election to the House of Commons in 2024 as MP for North Antrim.
