= Welsh Government roads review =

2023 new road infrastructure review in Wales

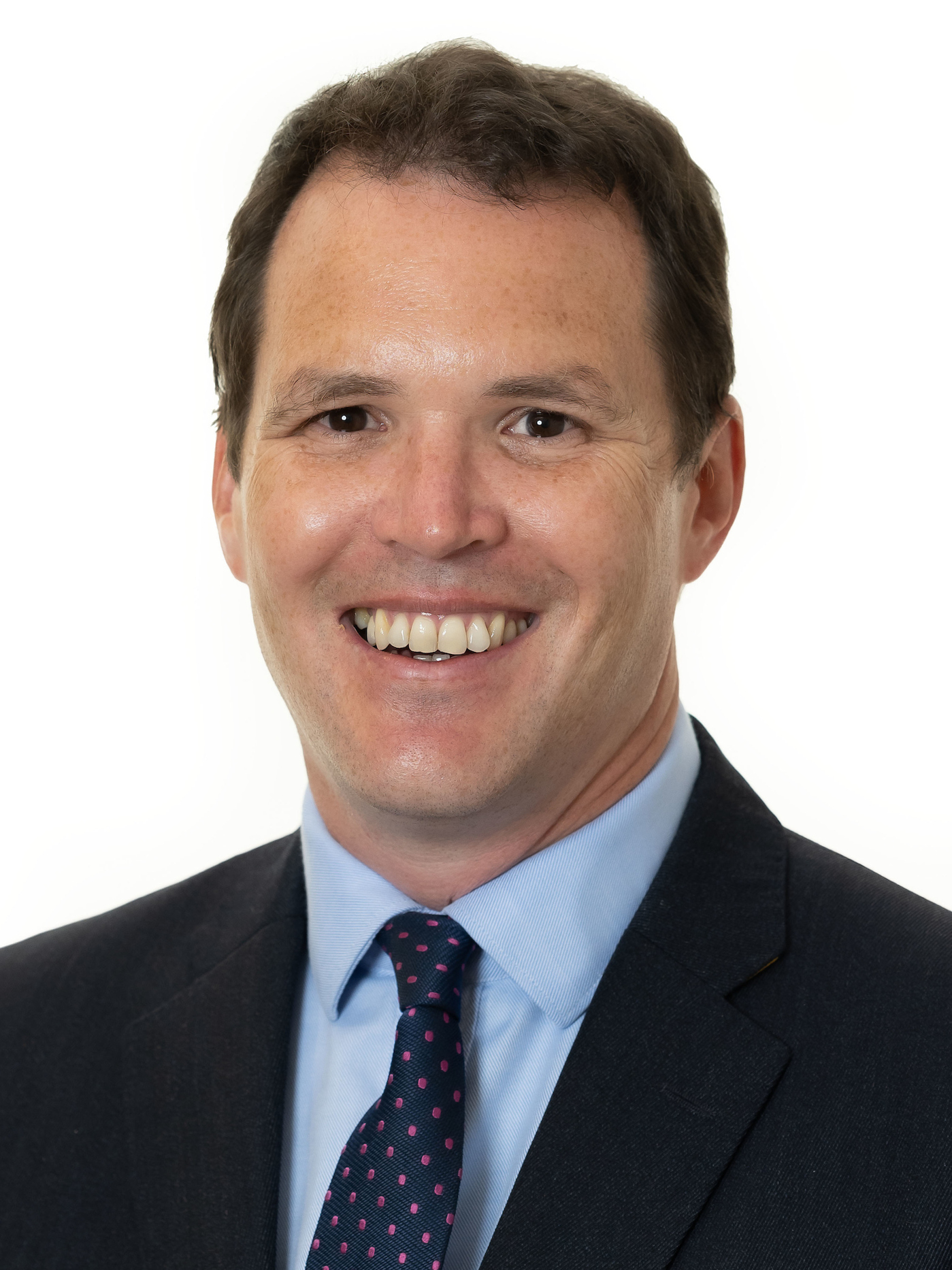
Lee Waters, Deputy Minister for Climate Change, commissioned the review.

On 14 February 2023, The Future of Road Investment in Wales report was published by the Welsh Government. The report concluded a period of reassessment on the government's existing commitments to Wales' road infrastructure and how it matched new government policy. It is commonly shortened as the Welsh Government's roads review.

Most existing road infrastructure projects were either cancelled, paused for modification, or replaced with an alternative. Those cancelled, included most of the major proposed projects, such as the Third Menai Crossing and Flintshire Red Route.

== Background and history ==
Surface transport emissions are the third-largest source of Wales' carbon emissions, although the Committee on Climate Change described Wales' emissions as having been "virtually flat[ened]" since 1990. First Minister Mark Drakeford stated transport emissions accounted for 15% of Wales' emissions and has been the "most stubborn sector" to reduce them.

In 2019, the Welsh Government declared a climate emergency, and set 2050 as a target date for Wales to achieve net zero emissions; significant policy changes, compared to those in place when many of the road investment scheme were first conceived. In its 2021 Llwybr Newydd, Wales' transport strategy, the government plans a "new path" on policy, focusing on reducing the need for travel and supporting travel that is sustainable. An updated land-use planning policy would complement the transport strategy, and embed a "sustainable transport hierarchy". The Net Zero Plan and the strategy aim for passenger transport emissions to be reduced by 22% between 2019 and 2024, and by 98% by 2050. Both call for miles driven by cars to be reduced by 10% by 2030, and for active travel and public transport to account for an increased modal share of 39% by 2030 and 45% by 2040.

The actions required to meet these commitments were stated to be "huge", with the Senedd's Climate Change Environment and Infrastructure Committee stating in October 2022, that the modal share targets were not backed up by tools that can ensure the pledges can be delivered. Another report said that the Welsh government's pre-existing policy would have only delivered "just over one fifth" of the changes to modal shift needed for net zero.

=== History ===
In June 2021, Deputy Minister for Climate Change, Lee Waters, announced the review of funding for new road schemes by the Welsh Government. Therefore, work on new schemes would be paused for the review. Projects that were already underway at the time of the announcement would still continue, such as the Heads of the Valleys road in South Wales.

In September 2022, the panel submitted their final report to the Welsh Government. It was published on 14 February 2023.

== Aims ==
The Welsh Government stated it commissioned the roads review for the following reasons:

- Ensuring road investment assists the government's delivery of their transport strategy, government programme, and Net Zero aims for Wales
- Develop new criteria for when new road building is needed
- Use such new criteria to decide whether existing projects should be supported, altered or scrapped
- Guide the government on when to reallocate road space on the road network which might benefit from future enhancement
- Look into making savings on road investment while ensuring road issues are addressed, and how to address the backlog of road maintenance

It was also stated that the review looked into whether roads also aligned with government policies, and overall being good, concerning the environment, communities, places, people, culture, the Welsh language, and the economy.

== Review ==
=== Process ===
The review was conducted by a panel comprising those from the transport policy, highway engineering, climate change, and freight/logistics sectors. The panel's chair was Lynn Sloman.

The panel identified and reviewed 59 schemes. Eight were later dropped due to their insufficient information, or the projects were out of the review's scope. Therefore, 46 schemes made it to the final decision stage of the review.

=== Review panel ===
The roads review panel was appointed by Lee Waters, deputy minister for climate change in September 2021.

The panel consisted of:

- Lynn Sloman (chair)
- Julie Hunt (Civil engineer and Chartered Institution of Highways and Transport Cymru Wales chair)
- Glenn Lyons (Future mobility professor at University of the West of England)
- Geoff Ogden (Director at Transport for Wales)
- John Parkin (Transport professor at University of the West of England)
- Andrew Potter (Cardiff Business School)
- Helen Pye (Snowdonia National Park Authority)
- Eurgain Powell (Public Health Wales)

Secretariats to the panel included:

- Matt Jones (Welsh Government)
- Natasha McCarthy (Transport for Wales)
- Janice Hughes
- Matt Fry and Arcadis
- Rob Kent-Smith (Welsh Government liaison; review sponsor)

=== Findings ===
The report set out two main recommendations, that new future road investment follows four "purposes" and four "conditions".

The four purposes were: to support modal shift, reduce casualties through small changes, adapt to climate change, and support prosperity through access to development sites that can support sustainable transport. The purposes do not impact maintenance or renewal programmes.

The four conditions were: minimise construction carbon emissions, no increasing vehicle speeds that increase emissions, no increasing of road capacity for cars, and do not adversely affect ecologically valuable sites.

The report overall sets out 51 recommendations. These include: calling for regional investment programmes on multi-modal transport, a modal shift programme and safer speeds and routes programme for trunk roads, increased attention on freight, and creating "exemplar" economic and residential developments.

== Impact on existing projects ==
55 schemes were identified and, subsequently, impacted. 8 schemes were later not reviewed due to being "out of scope" or not having enough information. Of the existing road investment schemes reviewed;

- 17 were allowed to go ahead, as they either met the new criteria or could be modified to meet it.
- 31 were not allowed to go ahead.
  - Of these, 9 schemes, all in early-development, were recommended for alternatives.
  - 8 schemes had their existing proposal described as "not appropriate", but an alternative solution or multiple could have a stronger case.
  - 14 schemes were stated to have "not been demonstrated sufficiently".

By region:

- Mid Wales: 4 approved, 4 cancelled (2 fully, 2 mostly)
- North Wales: 2 approved, 14 cancelled (10 fully, 4 mostly), 5 out-of-scope
- South East Wales: 5 approved, 4 fully cancelled, 2 out-of-scope
- South West Wales: 6 approved, 4 cancelled (3 fully, 1 mostly), 4 out-of-scope

Those cancelled included "all major road building projects," which sometimes amounted to nine. Specific major examples include the planned Third Menai Crossing, the Flintshire Red Route and the A483 Wrexham improvements, in North Wales.

Those proceeding are much smaller, with the largest being the A4042 Pontypool to M4 improvements in Torfaen. Other small improvements going ahead include the A487 Fishguard–Cardigan, and the A4076 in Haverfordwest. Other projects still going ahead include the Llandeilo bypass in Carmarthenshire, and the A465 dualling in the South Wales Valleys.

Of those in North Wales, the government had already spent £20 million on projects, many of which were later cancelled.

== Response ==
Environmental campaigners from Friends of the Earth Cymru described it as "world-leading and brave". It was also welcomed by Welsh Liberal Democrats leader Jane Dodds.

Following publication, the report was criticised by then former Minister for Transport, Ken Skates, stating it "ignore[d] citizens". Skates also called for decisions on roads in North Wales to be devolved to the region.

Some representatives of the construction industry, specifically that of the Civil Engineering Contractors Association, warned the report and the subsequent cancellation of projects could put jobs at risk, and asked for clarity on future infrastructure investment.

Welsh Conservatives leader Andrew RT Davies, criticised the decision, stating it was "Utter madness". While Plaid Cymru MS Delyth Jewell agreed on reducing Wales' over-reliance on cars, but stated that there should also be a focus on a transition period, as many areas are "already underserved by public transport links".

Following criticism, the review's chair, Lynn Sloman, stated in March 2023, that there was "considerable engagement" during the review, despite claims there were not. Sloman defended the decision not to consult the public and complained how the panel's work has been portrayed. Sloman stated that over 30 meetings were conducted with key stakeholders, and engaged with 25 organisations, the third sector, young people, professional institutions, and 14 local authorities. First Minister Mark Drakeford, said that the panel's engagement was "extensive".

Following the announcement, in July 2023, a poll was revealed showing opposition to the decision. The 30 June–11 July poll by Opinium of 2,001 Welsh adults, showed that 49% opposed the ban, 33% supported it, and 18% did not know. When accounting for the main three political parties, there was more opposition than support. Conservative voters were most opposed, with 67% opposed compared to 26% supporting. Whereas Labour voters were 46% oppose and 38% support. Plaid Cymru had the narrowest margin, with 43% of their voters opposing and 39% supporting the decision.

The specific cancellation of certain schemes was also criticised, with Labour MP Mark Tami opposing the cancellation of the Flintshire Red Route.

== See also ==
- Trunk roads in Wales
- 20 mph default speed limit law in Wales
