= Cabinet Secretary for North Wales =

Former Welsh Government minister

Cabinet Secretary for North Wales of the Welsh Government
- Ysgrifennydd y Cabinet dros Ogledd Cymru (Welsh)
- Welsh Government
- Style: Welsh Minister
- Status: Cabinet Minister
- Abbreviation: Minister
- Member of: Senedd; Cabinet
- Reports to: the Senedd and the First Minister of Wales
- Seat: Cardiff
- Nominator: First Minister of Wales
- Appointer: The Crown
- Term length: Five years Subject to elections to the Senedd which take place every five years
- First holder: Ken Skates AM
- Final holder: Ken Skates MS
- Abolished: 12 May 2026
- Website: gov.wales/ken-skates-ms

The Cabinet Secretary for North Wales (Welsh: Ysgrifennydd y Cabinet dros Ogledd Cymru) (Note: Formerly Minister for North Wales (Welsh: Y Gweinidog Gogledd Cymru; or Gweinidog y Gogledd; lit. 'Minister for the north')) was a member of the cabinet in the Welsh Government. The last officeholder was Ken Skates from March 2024 to May 2026.

The establishment of a role focusing on North Wales was first raised in 2009, but was established by Mark Drakeford in 2018. It was established over concerns of how devolution was centred on South Wales. A Plaid Cymru MS disputed the role's existence, while some argue for a directly elected mayor instead. Plaid Cymru abolished the role in the ap Iorwerth government in May 2026.

== Ministers ==
Name	Picture	Entered office	Left office	Other offices held	Political party	Government	Notes
Minister for North Wales
Ken Skates		14 December 2018	13 May 2021	Minister for Economy and Transport	Labour	First Drakeford government	
Lesley Griffiths		13 May 2021	20 March 2024	Minister for Rural Affairs Trefnydd	Labour	Second Drakeford government	
Cabinet Secretary for North Wales
Ken Skates		21 March 2024	12 May 2026	Cabinet Secretary for Transport	Labour	Gething government	

== Background and history ==
=== Earlier proposals and North Wales representation ===
In her leadership bid for the 2009 Welsh Labour leadership election, Edwina Hart, stated she would establish a "Minister for North Wales", if she won and set up the next Welsh Assembly Government.

In 2010, the Welsh Assembly Government opened a local assembly office in Llandudno Junction, Conwy, to decentralise government and the civil service, as well as spread the "benefits [of] devolution" to North Wales. Prior to this, only 23% of Welsh Government posts were outside Cardiff. The Llandudno Junction building later became very underused by 2011 for its purpose, and was costing £1 million annually.

On 19 July 2011, the opposition Welsh Conservatives, gave specific responsibilities to a shadow minister over "North Wales". The responsibilities were passed to Mark Isherwood, the Shadow Minister for Housing and Social Justice, who would have additional responsibilities concerning North Wales alongside his usual shadow ministerial responsibilities.

On 27 July 2011, the Welsh Assembly Government held its first cabinet meeting in North Wales, with First Minister of Wales, Carwyn Jones, stating he plans his government to have a "significant presence" in North Wales.

=== Establishment of post ===
In 2017, a Chief Regional Officer role for North Wales was established by the Welsh Government.

In his campaign to become leader of Welsh Labour, for the 2018 Welsh Labour leadership election, Mark Drakeford announced that if he were to win the leadership contest, he would set up a ministerial post dedicated to the interests of North Wales. Drakeford repeated the plans he had for a North Wales post, for his first cabinet, after winning the leadership contest.

The post was established on 14 December 2018, with Ken Skates as the inaugural holder. It is the first ministerial post in the Welsh Government dedicated to North Wales.

In April 2024, Plaid Cymru MS Llyr Gruffydd disputed whether the role should exist, stating all ministers should represent all of Wales, which includes North Wales. Gruffydd also claimed the role would be viewed as "tokenistic" by some, and that if there was a role for North Wales, where are the roles for other regions of Wales, such as West Wales and Mid Wales. While the Welsh Conservatives have shadow ministers with these roles.

=== Calls for a devolved post ===
Following the Welsh Government roads review, where all of the major road projects in North Wales were cancelled in February 2023. There were calls to establish a "metro mayor", comparable to the directly elected mayors in England, for North Wales. Proposers argued that the area is being ignored, that it was an example of a North-South divide in Wales, and that the devolved post would be a "real Minister for North Wales", but would still be accountable to the Welsh Government. The Welsh Government responded to calls stating they already have a Minister for North Wales in their cabinet, which would "champion[...] the north and its many strengths and opportunities".

== Responsibilities ==
The minister would be responsible on overseeing issues relating to North Wales, and would be the chair of the Cabinet Sub Committee for North Wales.

As a Welsh Minister, the holder is to have an annual salary of £105,701 for 2020–2021.

== See also ==
- Minister for the Northern Powerhouse and Local Growth
- Ministry
