= Cabinet Minister for Enterprise, Connectivity and Energy =

Welsh Government cabinet minister

Cabinet Minister for Enterprise, Connectivity and Energy of Wales

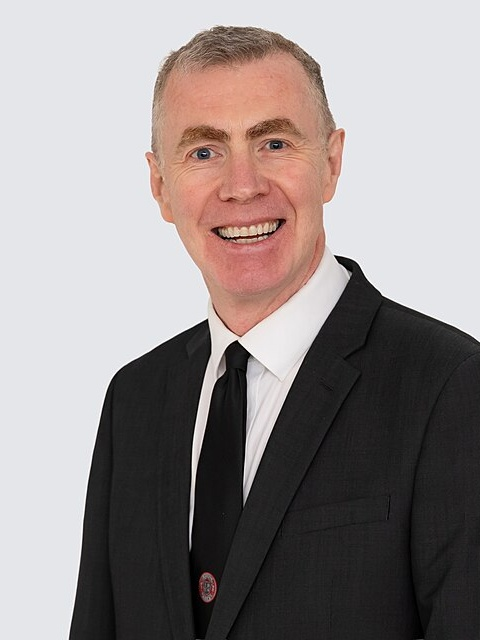
- Incumbent; Adam Price MS since 13 May 2026
- Welsh Government
- Style: Welsh Minister
- Status: Cabinet Minister
- Abbreviation: Economy Secretary
- Member of: Senedd; Cabinet
- Reports to: the Senedd and the First Minister of Wales
- Seat: Cardiff
- Nominator: First Minister of Wales
- Appointer: The Crown
- Term length: Four years; Subject to elections to the Senedd which take place every four years
- Formation: 12 May 1999
- First holder: Rhodri Morgan AM
- Salary: £105,701 per annum

The Cabinet Minister for Enterprise, Connectivity and Energy is a member of the Cabinet in the Welsh Government. The current officeholder is Adam Price since May 2026.

The position was titled Minister for the Economy and Transport from 2007 to 2011. The Minister had responsibility for the Department for the Economy and Transport, which combined two devolved functions of the Welsh Government: Business and Economy, and Transport. The department was created in June 2007, as successor to the Department for Enterprise Innovation and Networks, following the National Assembly for Wales elections in May 2007.

Deputy First Minister Ieuan Wyn Jones AM was appointed to the post in July 2007, succeeding Dr Brian Gibbons AM, who had been Minister since the previous month, and held the position until 13 May 2011. The role was renamed Minister for Business, Enterprise, Technology and Science during Edwina Hart's tenure in office from 2011 to 2016. The post adopted the previous title of Economy Minister under Hart's successor, Ken Skates.

== Ministers ==
Name	Picture	Entered office	Left office	Other offices held	Political party	Government
Secretary for Economic Development and European Affairs (1999–2000)
Rhodri Morgan AM		12 May 1999	9 February 2000		Labour	Michael administration
Secretary for Economic Development (2000)
Rhodri Morgan AM		9 February 2000	16 October 2000	First Secretary of Wales (acting until 15 February)	Labour	Interim Rhodri Morgan administration
Minister for Economic Development (2000–2003)
Michael German AM		5 October 2000	1 May 2003	Deputy First Minister of Wales	Liberal Democrats	First Morgan government
Minister for Economic Development and Transport (2003–2007)
Andrew Davies AM		1 May 2003	3 May 2007		Labour	Second Rhodri Morgan government
Minister for the Economy and Transport (2007–2011)
Brian Gibbons AM		26 May 2007	19 July 2007		Labour	Third Rhodri Morgan government
Ieuan Wyn Jones AM		19 July 2007	11 May 2011	Deputy First Minister of Wales	Plaid Cymru	Fourth Rhodri Morgan government
Ieuan Wyn Jones AM		19 July 2007	11 May 2011	Deputy First Minister of Wales	Plaid Cymru	First Jones government
Minister for Business, Enterprise, Technology & Science (2011–2016)
Edwina Hart AM		11 May 2011	19 May 2016		Labour	Second Jones government
Cabinet Secretary for Economy and Infrastructure (2016–17) Cabinet Secretary for Economy and Transport (2017–18) Minister for Economy, Transport and North Wales (2018–21)
Ken Skates MS		19 May 2016	13 May 2021		Labour	Third Jones government First Drakeford government
Minister for the Economy (2021–2024)
Vaughan Gething MS		13 May 2021	20 March 2024		Labour	Second Drakeford Government
Cabinet Secretary for Economy, Energy and Welsh Language
Jeremy Miles MS		21 March 2024	16 July 2024		Labour	Gething government
Cabinet Secretary for the Economy, Transport and North Wales
Ken Skates MS		17 July 2024	11 September 2024	Cabinet Secretary for Transport Cabinet Secretary for North Wales	Labour	Gething government Eluned Morgan government
Cabinet Secretary for Economy, Energy and Planning
Rebecca Evans MS		11 September 2024	12 May 2026		Labour	Eluned Morgan government
Cabinet Minister for Enterprise, Connectivity and Energy
Adam Price		13 May 2026	Incumbent		Plaid Cymru	ap Iorwerth government

== Responsibilities ==
Following the "yes" vote in the Welsh referendum of 1997, certain Westminster government executive and legislative powers were devolved to the National Assembly for Wales by the Government of Wales Act 1998. This included the power to determine how their budgets are spent and administered. These powers were increased by the Government of Wales Act 2006. Among those powers are Business and Economy, and Transport, for which the Minister for the Economy and Transport had responsibility within the Welsh Assembly Government.

The department's funding was allocated by the Welsh Assembly Government, following agreement of its annual budget.

The Department for Economy and Transport's stated objectives were to:

- create jobs across Wales
- stimulate enterprise and growth
- enhance skills for jobs

=== Business and economy ===
The Minister was responsible for supporting businesses in Wales, including growth and development, inward investment, provision of premises, commercial and industrial environmental improvements, and exports.

Policy for the allocation of European Union Structural Funds in Wales, and its administration, was in the remit of the Minister.

=== Transport ===
The Minister was responsible for transport policy in specific areas. The Minister's main priorities were: development of an integrated transport system in Wales; construction, improvement and maintenance of trunk roads and motorways in Wales; Transport for Wales passenger rail services; road safety strategies including speed limits, pedestrian crossings and on-street parking. The Minister also oversaw the provision of other public transport services, such as buses.

== The Department ==
Following the National Assembly for Wales elections on 3 May 2007, the Welsh Assembly Government restructured its departments. The former Department for Enterprise Innovation and Networks was absorbed into the new Department for the Economy and Transport on 1 June 2007. Dr Brian Gibbons was appointed to the post of Minister for the Economy and Transport on its creation.

A coalition government was formed by the Labour Party and Plaid Cymru on 7 July 2007. The resulting reshuffle of the Cabinet was announced on 19 July 2007, which saw Ieuan Wyn Jones AM (Member of the National Assembly for Wales for Ynys Môn) appointed to the posts of Deputy First Minister for Wales and Minister for the Economy and Transport.

James Price, as acting Director General, Economy and Transport was the senior civil servant responsible for the department.

After the 2011 Welsh general election, the department was abolished and replaced with the department of Business, Enterprise and Technology.

== See also ==
- Conservative Party
- Labour Party
- Ministry
- Plaid Cymru
- Welsh Conservative Party
- Welsh Labour
