= Lesley Griffiths =

Welsh politician (born 1960)

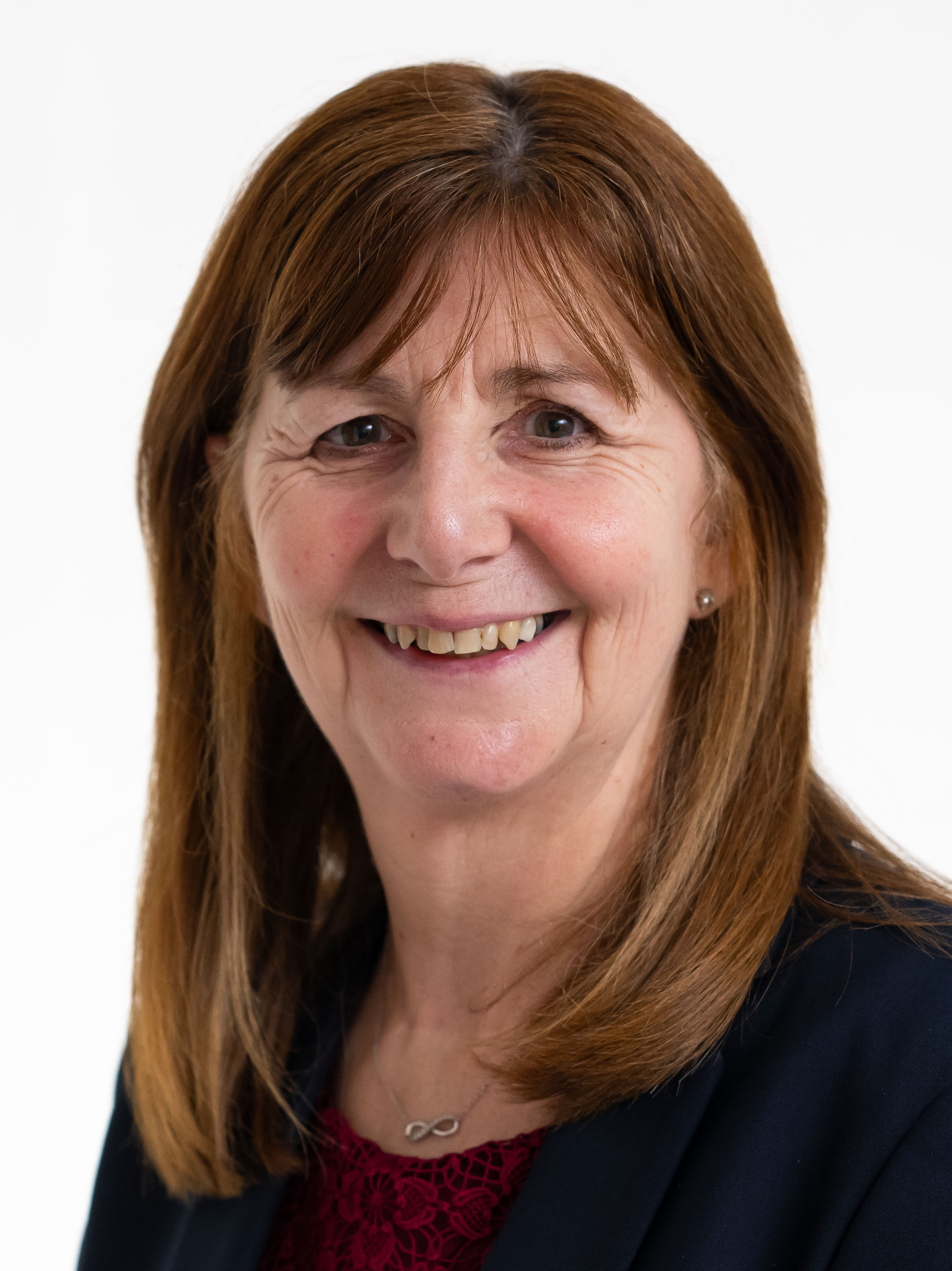
- Official portrait, 2024

Cabinet Secretary for Culture and Social Justice
- In office 21 March 2024 – 16 July 2024
- First Minister: Vaughan Gething
- Preceded by: Jane Hutt
- Succeeded by: Jane Hutt

Trefnydd of the Senedd
- In office 13 May 2021 – 21 March 2024
- First Minister: Mark Drakeford
- Preceded by: Rebecca Evans
- Succeeded by: Jane Hutt

Minister for North Wales
- In office 13 May 2021 – 20 March 2024
- First Minister: Mark Drakeford
- Preceded by: Ken Skates
- Succeeded by: Ken Skates

Minister for Rural Affairs (Note: Cabinet Secretary for Environment and Rural Affairs from May 2016 to November 2017; Cabinet Secretary for Energy, Planning, and Rural Affairs from November 2017 to December 2018; Minister for Environment, Energy, and Rural Affairs from December 2018 to May 2021; Minister for Rural Affairs from May 2021 to March 2024)
- In office 19 May 2016 – 21 March 2024
- First Minister: Carwyn Jones; Mark Drakeford
- Preceded by: Carl Sargeant
- Succeeded by: Huw Irranca-Davies

Minister for Communities and Tackling Poverty
- In office 11 September 2014 – 19 May 2016
- First Minister: Carwyn Jones
- Preceded by: Jeffrey Cuthbert
- Succeeded by: Carl Sargeant

Minister for Local Government and Government Business
- In office 14 March 2013 – 11 September 2014
- First Minister: Carwyn Jones
- Preceded by: Carl Sargeant
- Succeeded by: Leighton Andrews (Public Services); Jane Hutt (Government Business)

Minister for Health and Social Services
- In office 11 May 2011 – 14 March 2013
- First Minister: Carwyn Jones
- Preceded by: Edwina Hart
- Succeeded by: Mark Drakeford

Member of the Senedd for Wrexham
- In office 3 May 2007 – 7 April 2026
- Preceded by: John Marek
- Succeeded by: Seat abolished
- Majority: 1,350 (6.0%)

Personal details
- Born: 1960 (age 65–66)
- Party: Welsh Labour
- Occupation: Political Advisor
- Website: Lesley Griffiths

Susan Lesley Griffiths (born 1960) is a Welsh Labour politician who was Cabinet Secretary for Culture and Social Justice from March to July 2024. She previously served as Trefnydd of the Senedd and Minister for North Wales from 2021 to 2024, and Minister for Rural Affairs from 2016 to 2024. She worked as a secretary to John Marek and the constituency assistant to Ian Lucas, successive Members of Parliament for Wrexham, and was elected to the Senedd from the Wrexham constituency in 2007. She has held a number of cabinet positions in the Welsh Government. In December 2009 she was appointed Deputy Minister for Science, Innovation and Skills.

In 2011, she was appointed Minister for Health and Social Services. She was then appointed Minister for Local Government and Government Business in March 2013. In September 2014 she was appointed Minister for Communities and Tackling Poverty. Following the 2016 election, she was appointed Cabinet Secretary for Environment and Rural Affairs following her own re-election. She retained her post in a Welsh Government Cabinet reshuffle in November 2017, but with a revised portfolio of Energy, Planning, and Rural Affairs with Hannah Blythyn becoming her Deputy Minister for the Environment.

Griffiths stood down from the Senedd at the 2026 Senedd election.

== 2003 campaign ==
Griffiths was a secretary to John Marek, who represented Wrexham as a Labour member of the Welsh Assembly. However, in 2003 Marek was de-selected by the local party and Griffiths was selected in his place. There followed a Labour Party inquiry, in which Marek was first contacted by telephone half an hour before the result was announced, and his de-selection was upheld. Marek then decided to fight to retain his seat as an independent, and Griffiths struggled during the campaign; an early poll showed Marek beating her by 40% to 29%. In the event, on polling day Marek beat Griffiths by 973 votes.

== Subsequent elections ==
Having been a supporter of Wrexham Football Club, Griffiths was elected to the board of the Wrexham Supporters Trust. In December 2005 she was selected again as Labour candidate for the Wrexham constituency for the 2007 Assembly elections. She benefited from high-profile support as the party saw an opportunity to recapture the seat; John Marek appealed to the large Polish immigrant population by translating his election material into Polish. However, Griffiths increased her numerical vote while Marek's vote fell, and she won the seat by 1,250.

In 2011, Griffiths faced Marek for a third time, though by now Marek had joined the Conservatives. Both of them saw increases in their votes compared to 2007, but Griffiths held the seat with an increased majority of 3,337. Griffiths was re-selected to defend her seat at the 2016 election, and retained it with a reduced majority of 1,325 over the Conservative candidate.

== Ministerial responsibility ==
Griffiths was appointed Deputy Minister for Science, Innovation and Skills in December 2009. After the 2011 election, she was promoted to the Minister for Health and Social Services, a post she held until March 2013 when she was appointed Minister for Local Government and Government Business. In September 2014 she was appointed Minister for Communities and Tackling Poverty. She was appointed Cabinet Secretary for Environment and Rural Affairs following re-election in May 2016, before being appointed Cabinet Secretary for Energy, Planning, and Rural Affairs in November 2017. She became Minister for Environment, Energy, and Rural Affairs in the First Drakeford government in December 2018 and then Minister for Rural Affairs and North Wales, and Trefnydd in May 2021. In March 2024, Griffiths was appointed Cabinet Secretary for Culture and Social Justice in the Gething government.

In October 2018 Griffiths used her ministerial office to overturn the decision of a planning inspector to refuse a proposed wind farm near Llandrindod Wells. In November the Campaign for the Protection of Rural Wales announced that it was challenging this in the High Court.

In July 2024, Griffiths resigned from the Welsh Cabinet, alongside three other cabinet members, from First Minister Vaughan Gething's government, prompting Gething's subsequent resignation as First Minister.

== Offices held ==
Senedd
Preceded by John Marek	Member of the Senedd for Wrexham; 2007–2026	Succeeded by Constituency abolished
Political offices
Preceded by John Griffiths	Deputy Minister for Science, Innovation and Skills; 2009–2011	Succeeded by Jeff Cuthbert
Preceded by Edwina Hart	Minister for Health and Social Services; 2011–2013	Succeeded by Mark Drakeford
New post	Minister for Communities; 2013–2016	Succeeded by Carl Sargeant
New post	Minister for Rural Affairs; 2016–present	Incumbent
Previous: Ken Skates	Minister for North Wales; 2021–present	Incumbent
