= Deputy Minister for Transport =

Welsh Government minister

Deputy Minister for Transport of Wales
- Dirprwy Weinidog dros Drafnidiaeth

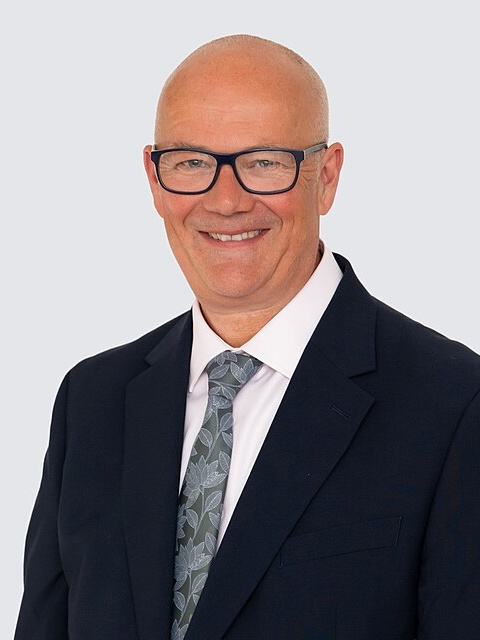
- Incumbent; Mark Hooper MS since 13 May 2026
- Welsh Government
- Style: Welsh Deputy Minister
- Status: Deputy Minister
- Member of: Senedd; Cabinet
- Reports to: the Senedd and the First Minister of Wales
- Seat: Cardiff
- Nominator: First Minister of Wales
- Appointer: The Crown
- Term length: Four years; Subject to elections to the Senedd which take place every four years
- First holder: Sue Essex AM
- Salary: £101,443 (MS pay + £25,063 Deputy Minister pay)

The Deputy Minister for Transport (Welsh: Dirprwy Weinidog dros Drafnidiaeth) is a minister of the Welsh Government. It was previously a cabinet role known as the Cabinet Secretary for Transport (Welsh: Ysgrifennydd y Cabinet dros Drafnidiaeth) until 2026. The current officeholder is Mark Hooper, since May 2026.

== Holders of the role ==
Name	Picture	Entered office	Left office	Other offices held	Political party	Government	Notes
Secretary for Transport
Sue Essex		22 February 2000	16 October 2000	Secretary for Environment	Labour	Michael administration	
Sue Essex		22 February 2000	16 October 2000	Secretary for Planning	Labour	Interim Rhodri Morgan administration	
Minister for Transport
Sue Essex		2000	2003	Minister for Environment	Labour	First Rhodri Morgan government	
Sue Essex		2000	2003	Minister for Planning	Labour	First Rhodri Morgan government	
Deputy Minister for Economic Development and Transport
Brian Gibbons		13 May 2003	10 January 2005		Labour	Second Rhodri Morgan government	
Tamsin Dunwoody-Kneafsey		14 January 2005	2007		Labour	Second Rhodri Morgan government	
Minister for Transport
Brian Gibbons		7 June 2007	2007	Minister for the Economy	Labour	Third Rhodri Morgan government	
Cabinet Secretary for Infrastructure
Ken Skates		May 2016	2017		Labour	Third Jones government	
Cabinet Secretary / Minister for Transport
Ken Skates		2017	2021	Minister for the Economy	Labour	Third Jones government	
Ken Skates		2017	2021	Minister for North Wales	Labour	First Drakeford government	
Deputy Minister for Climate Change
Lee Waters		13 May 2021	20 March 2024		Labour	Second Drakeford government	
Cabinet Secretary for Transport
Ken Skates		21 March 2024		Cabinet Secretary for North Wales	Labour	Gething government	
Deputy Minister for Transport
Mark Hooper		13 May 2026	Incumbent		Plaid Cymru	ap Iorwerth government	

== Background ==
Following the 2021 Senedd election, First Minister of Wales, Mark Drakeford announced in the formation of the next Welsh government, that he would form a "super-ministry" centred on climate change, combining the portfolios of the environment, energy, housing, planning and transport. It would be headed by a Minister for Climate Change (announced to be Julie James MS), with a deputy minister assisting the government division.

The position partly oversaw transport in Wales, with the position also referred to by derivatives of the old name such as "transport minister".

Waters, the holder from 2021, oversaw during his period in the position a changing of the default speed limit on restricted roads from 30mph to 20mph, conducting a roads review involving scaling back new road construction, and overseeing the impact of COVID-19 on public transport in Wales, such as buses.

The ascendance of Vaughan Gething to the position of First Minister saw a new Cabinet formed, and the creation of the position of Cabinet Secretary for Transport. Ken Skates became the Cabinet Secretary and was also the Cabinet Secretary for North Wales.

After the 2026 Senedd election, Mark Hooper was appointed as the Deputy Minister for Transport.

== Responsibilities ==
The responsibilities of the post are:

- Transport
  - Transport policy
  - Transport for Wales
  - Roads, including construction, improvement and maintenance of motorways and trunk roads
  - Bus services
  - Rail services through the Wales and Borders franchise
  - Global Centre of Rail Excellence
  - Active travel
  - Aviation policy (including on Cardiff Airport)
  - Ports policy
  - Road safety; safer routes to schools; transport for children and young people; regulation of pedestrian crossings and on-street parking

== See also ==
- Ministry
