= Ken Skates =

Welsh politician (born 1976)

Ken Skates MS
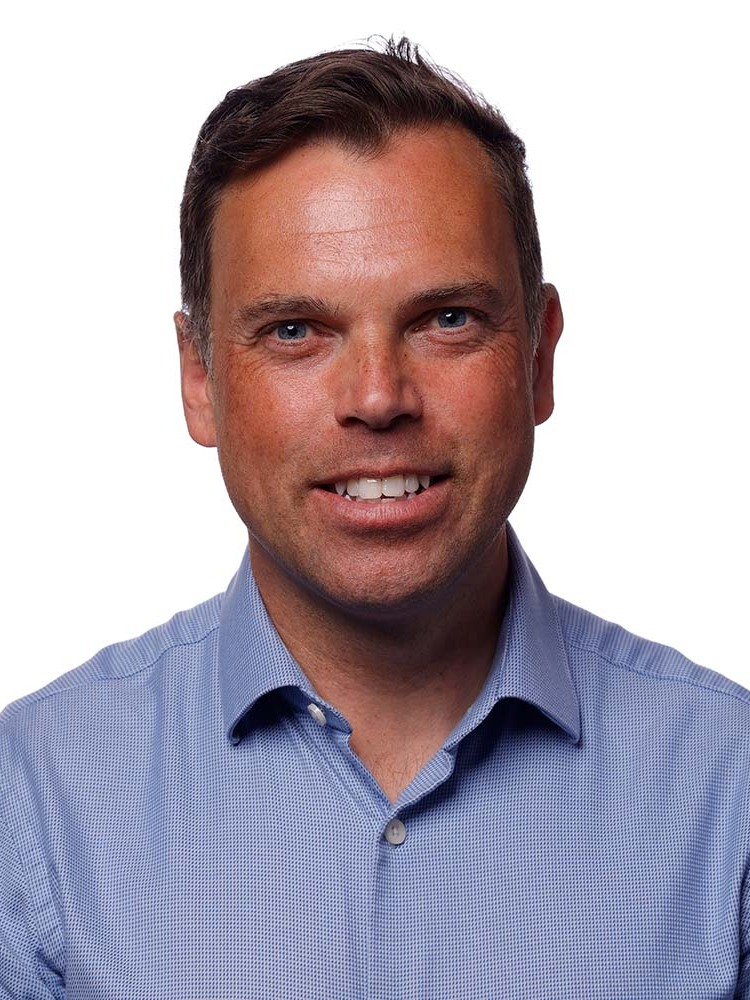
- Official portrait, 2026

Leader of Welsh Labour
- Incumbent
- Assumed office 15 July 2026 (Note: Interim: 9 May – 15 July 2026)
- Deputy: Carolyn Harris
- UK party leader: Keir Starmer; Andy Burnham
- Preceded by: Eluned Morgan
Ministerial offices
Cabinet Secretary for Transport and North Wales
In office 21 March 2024 – 12 May 2026
First Minister	Vaughan Gething; Eluned Morgan
Preceded by	Lesley Griffiths
Succeeded by	Mark Hooper (transport); Position abolished (North Wales)
Cabinet Secretary for the Economy
In office 17 July 2024 – 11 September 2024
First Minister	Vaughan Gething; Eluned Morgan
Preceded by	Jeremy Miles
Succeeded by	Rebecca Evans
Minister for Economy, Transport and North Wales
In office 19 May 2016 – 13 May 2021
First Minister	Carwyn Jones; Mark Drakeford
Preceded by	Edwina Hart
Succeeded by	Vaughan Gething
Deputy Minister for Culture, Sport and Tourism
In office 12 September 2014 – 19 May 2016
First Minister	Carwyn Jones
Preceded by	John Griffiths
Succeeded by	Dafydd Elis-Thomas
Deputy Minister for Skills and Technology
In office June 2013 – September 2014
First Minister	Carwyn Jones
Preceded by	Jeff Cuthbert
Succeeded by	Julie James

Member of the Senedd
- Incumbent
- Assumed office 6 May 2011
- Preceded by: Karen Sinclair
- Constituency: Clwyd South (2011–2026); Fflint Wrecsam (2026–present)

Personal details
- Born: Kenneth Christian Skates; 2 April 1976 (age 50) Wrexham, Wales
- Party: Welsh Labour
- Education: Sidney Sussex College, Cambridge
- Website: www.kenskates.co.uk

Kenneth Christian Skates (born 2 April 1976) is a Welsh Labour politician who has served as Leader of Welsh Labour since May 2026. He initially served as interim leader, before being appointed as the party's permanent leader unopposed in July 2026.

Skates represented the constituency of Clwyd South in the Senedd from the election of 2011; since 2026 he has represented the seat of Fflint Wrecsam. He is an alumnus of the University of Cambridge, and worked as a journalist prior to becoming a politician. In September 2014 he became the deputy minister for Culture, Tourism and Sport. From May 2016 to December 2018 he was the Cabinet Secretary for Economy, Infrastructure and Skills, and was the Minister for Economy, Transport and North Wales until he stood down on 13 May 2021. He held the Economy, Transport and North Wales position again between July and September 2024, when he assumed the economy portfolio. Following the 2026 Senedd election, Skates became interim Welsh Labour leader, before being elected permanent leader unopposed on 15 July.

== Early life and career ==
Skates was born in Wrexham Maelor Hospital, Wrexham, Wales. He attended Ysgol y Waun in Gwernaffield and the Alun School, Mold, where he gained four A grades at A-levels in maths, physics, English, and politics. He read social and political sciences at Sidney Sussex College, Cambridge, majoring in European regional policy and economics.

After graduating, Skates took a gap-period in the United States, before joining The Leader (Wrexham) newspaper. He studied for his NVQ in journalism at Yale College, Wrexham, and then went freelance, working for the Daily Express.

== Politics ==
Whilst working as a freelance journalist, Skates began working as office manager for Mark Tami, Welsh Labour MP for Alyn and Deeside. Skates was the lead Labour candidate for the North Wales regional seat in 2007 but wasn't elected. In 2011 he stood and was elected with 42% of the vote in Clwyd South, and was re-elected in 2016.

In 2012 he was one of four MSs to stand up in the Senedd chamber to talk about their experiences with mental health problems.

In June 2013, Skates was appointed by Welsh First Minister Carwyn Jones as Deputy Minister for Skills and Technology. In a reshuffle in September 2014 he was made Deputy Minister for Culture, Tourism and Sport in September 2014, replacing John Griffiths.

Following his re-election as MS for Clwyd South in the May 2016 Senedd elections, Ken Skates was promoted to Cabinet Secretary for Economy, Infrastructure and Skills in the Welsh Government.

In the formation of the Drakeford government in December 2018, Skates was appointed Minister for Economy, Transport and North Wales. After the May 2021 Senedd elections, Skates stepped down from the government, and his role was split into two. Vaughan Gething became the new Minister for the Economy, while Lesley Griffiths took over responsibility for North Wales as the new Minister for Rural Affairs and North Wales.

He was re-appointed Cabinet Secretary for Transport and North Wales in March 2024. He also held the economy portfolio from July and September 2024 following the resignation of that portfolio's holder.

Skates stood in the new Fflint Wrecsam Senedd constituency in the 2026 Senedd election.

After Labour Leader Eluned Morgan resigned following her loss in the 2026 Senedd election, Skates was appointed Interim Welsh Labour Leader following a meeting of Welsh Labour's executive committee and the Welsh Labour group. Skates thanked Morgan for her 'thirty years of service to Wales and the Labour Party' stating further that 'today is just the beginning of a process that will help us to understand what we got wrong'. He became the party's permanent leader after being nominated by all Welsh Labour MSs.

On 3 June 2026, Skates said that Keir Starmer was correct not to resign after Welsh Labour's Senedd election defeat, saying, "Keir is doing, I think, an incredible job in incredibly difficult times".

Skates is politically thought to be in the centre of the Labour Party when contrasted with the more left-wing stance of former leader Mark Drakeford.

Senedd
Preceded by Karen Sinclair	Member of the Senedd for Clwyd South; 2011–2026	Succeeded by Constituency abolished
Preceded by Constituency created	Member of the Senedd for Fflint Wrecsam; 2026-present	Incumbent
Political offices
Preceded by Jeff Cuthbert	Deputy Minister for Skills and Technology; 2013–2014	Succeeded by Julie James
Preceded by John Griffiths	Deputy Minister for Culture, Sport and Tourism; 2014–2016	Succeeded by Dafydd Elis-Thomas
Preceded by Edwina Hart	Cabinet Secretary for Economy, Transport and North Wales; 2016–2021	Succeeded by Vaughan Gething as Minister for the Economy
Preceded by Edwina Hart	Cabinet Secretary for Economy, Transport and North Wales; 2016–2021	Succeeded by Lesley Griffiths as Minister for Rural Affairs and North Wales
Party political offices
Preceded by Eluned Morgan	Leader of Welsh Labour; 2026–present	Incumbent
