= Alison Halford =

British politician and police officer (1940–2025)

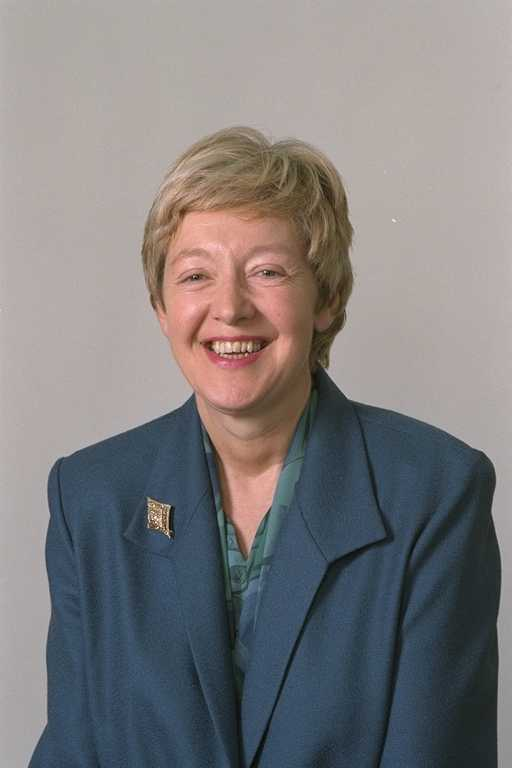

Flintshire County Councillor for Ewloe ward
- In office 1 May 2008 – 4 May 2017
- Preceded by: M. Warburton
- Succeeded by: Janet Anne Axworthy
- In office 4 May 1995 – 6 May 1999
- Preceded by: New Council
- Succeeded by: D. Parry

Member of the Welsh Assembly for Delyn
- In office 6 May 1999 – 1 May 2003
- Preceded by: New Assembly
- Succeeded by: Sandy Mewies

Personal details
- Born: Alison Monica Halford; 8 May 1940 Norwich, England
- Died: 22 February 2025 (aged 84)
- Party: Conservative
- Other political affiliations: Labour (until 2006)
- Occupation: Police officer

Alison Monica Halford (8 May 1940 – 22 February 2025) was a British senior police officer and later a politician. Halford worked for the Metropolitan Police from 1962 to 1983. She became the first woman to lead a police division. She then moved to Merseyside Police, becoming the first woman outside the Metropolitan Police to reach Chief Officer rank. She later left Merseyside police, alleging gender discrimination. She later withdrew the claim following a settlement, and retired from the police in 1992, before moving into politics. She was Labour member of the National Assembly for Wales, representing the Delyn constituency, between 1999 and 2003. In 2006 she defected to the Conservative Party, and represented them on Flintshire County Council from 2008 to 2017.

== Early life ==
Halford was born in Norwich on 8 May 1940. She attended the Catholic Notre Dame Grammar School in the city.

She served for three years in the Women's Royal Air Force, before moving to London to train as a dental hygienist.

== Police career ==
In 1962, Halford joined the Metropolitan Police. She rose rapidly in the police. She became a Detective Constable soon after completing her probation, joined a fast track promotion scheme, and was promoted to Inspector in 1967. She reached the rank of Chief Superintendent in the Metropolitan Police, and was the first woman in the country to command a police sub-division, taking command of Tottenham Court Road police station.

In 1983, she became Assistant Chief Constable of Merseyside Police, the first woman to hold that rank in British police history, the first woman outside the Metropolitan Police to hold Chief Officer rank and the highest-ranking female police officer in the UK at the time. She claimed to have faced discrimination on the basis of sex in her new post, however, and did not get on well with Chief Constable Kenneth Oxford. Despite repeated attempts she failed to win further promotion, after which she brought a sexual discrimination claim. She faced disciplinary proceedings from Merseyside police, which a High Court judge stated "had the smell of unfairness about [them]". The claim was withdrawn following a settlement between the two parties. She retired in 1992, stating she would "be free of what has become a nightmare" on doing so.

In 1997, the European Court of Human Rights awarded her £10,000 under Article 13 of the European Convention on Human Rights against the UK in respect of telephone tapping committed by the Merseyside Police in order to find evidence to dispute her sexual discrimination complaint – this violated her Article 8 right to respect for private life.

== Political career ==
=== Welsh Labour ===
==== Local Government ====
Shortly after moving to North Wales, Halford joined the Labour Party. She was elected as a Labour councillor for Ewloe on Flintshire County Council in 1995. She served as the council's representative on North Wales Police Authority. She did not contest the 1999 elections, instead contesting a National Assembly for Wales seat.

==== National Assembly for Wales ====
Halford was selected to contest the Delyn constituency for the Welsh Labour Party in the new National Assembly for Wales in December 1998. She was successfully elected at the 1999 Welsh assembly election, with a majority of 5,417 votes.

In February 2000, Halford abstained in a vote of confidence in First Minister at the time Alun Michael, shortly after he resigned as leader of the Welsh Labour party and as First Minister. She later wrote to say this was because she believed the vote should not have taken place, as he had already resigned.

Also during her term in the assembly, she called for AMs and MPs to receive the same rate of pay, called for anti-aircraft guns to be place around North Wales' nuclear power stations, and lead a campaign for the Gold Cape of Mold to be returned from the British Museum to North Wales. She also opposed the construction of the Wales Millennium Centre, and was briefly suspended from the Assembly Labour group for defying the whip on a bill authorising its construction. She served on the assembly's Audit Committee, and was given the Western Mail's best committee member award in 2001 for the effectiveness of her scrutiny.

In March 2001, it was announced she was under investigation for charges of assault, after a January 2001 incident involving a taxi driver. She was cleared in August 2001, and alleged the investigation held into her was "unfair and biased".

She stood down at the 2003 Welsh Assembly election, and was replaced by Sandy Mewies.

=== Conservative Party ===
==== Defection ====
On 10 April 2006, Halford announced that she was joining the Conservatives, having grown increasingly disillusioned with the Labour Party. She especially cited the appointment of Peter Mandelson as a European Commissioner. She became an adviser to the Conservative Party and their Shadow Secretary of State for Wales on home affairs.

==== Local Government ====
In 2008, Halford was elected as a Flintshire County Councillor representing Ewloe for the Conservative Party, and as a Community Councillor on Hawarden community council. She was re-elected to both roles in 2012, and stood down from the council in 2017.

During her membership of the council, she was investigated for code of conduct violations a number of times. She was convicted of misleading an inquiry into the behaviour of Patrick Heesom, former independent leader of the council. During 2010, it emerged that she was under investigation for allegedly bullying the then council leader. In 2017, after she had left the council, she was further found again to have bullied council officials, by sending "highly offensive, extremely insulting, malicious and unwarranted" emails, over the matter of an illegal traveller "encampment" on a council site. She was banned from standing for the council for 14 months.

== Death ==
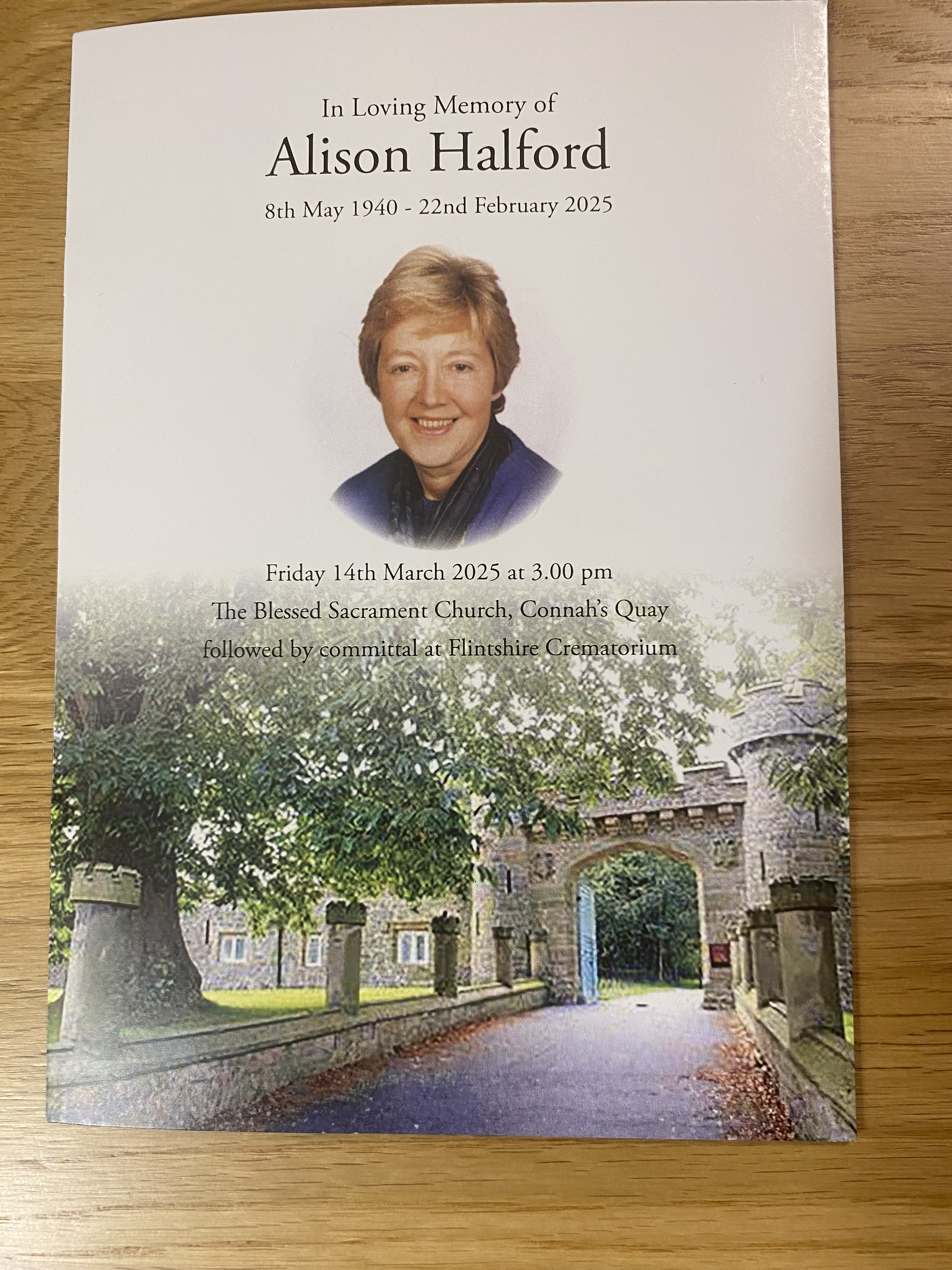
Halford's funeral service sheet

Halford died on 22 February 2025, aged 84.

Halford was featured on the BBC Sounds podcast 'Last Words' including memories from her niece, Lesley Goldsmith. Her funeral was on 14 March 2025, at the Blessed Sacrament Church, Connah's Quay.

== Publications ==
Halford wrote a book about her experiences, entitled No Way Up the Greasy Pole. Halford launched her second book Leeks from the Backbenches at the Welsh Assembly on 6 November 2007.

Senedd
Preceded by (new post)	Assembly Member for Delyn; 1999–2003	Succeeded by Sandy Mewies
