= Delyn =

Delyn can refer to:

- Delyn (district), a former district of Wales
- Delyn (UK Parliament constituency), a constituency based on the district
- Delyn (Senedd constituency), a constituency based on the district
- Ezhimala, known in older times as Delyn, a hill in Kerala, India
- Payyanur, also known as Delyn in older times after the nearby hill, a seaport in Kerala, India
