= Loveday (disambiguation) =

Loveday is a given name and surname.

Loveday may also refer to:

- Loveday, South Australia, a settlement
  - Loveday, a set of World War II prisoner-of-war camps in Australia
- Loveday Bay (South Australia), a bay
- Loveday (arbitration), a day, in medieval England, assigned to resolve legal differences under arbitration rather than common law
  - Loveday (1458), a ritualistic reconciliation that took place at St Paul's Cathedral
- Loveday, a series of novels by Kate Tremayne

== See also ==
- Babell or Gelliloveday, a former township of the parish of Ysceifiog, Wales
