= Holywell Rural District =

Abolished Welsh rural district

Coordinates: 53.275°N 3.223°W

Holywell
- Area
  - 1911: 64,470 acres (260.9 km^{2})
  - 1961: 58,329 acres (236.05 km^{2})
- Population
  - 1901: 23,999
  - 1971: 25,411
- History
  - Created: 1894
  - Abolished: 1974
  - Succeeded by: Delyn
- Status: Rural District
  - HQ: Holywell

Holywell was a rural district in the administrative county of Flintshire, Wales, from 1894 to 1974.

The district was created by the Local Government Act 1894 as successor to Holywell Rural Sanitary District.

The Rural District Council was based in the town of Holywell, which was a separate urban district.

Holywell Rural District was abolished in 1974 by the Local Government Act 1972, becoming part of the district of Delyn in the county of Clwyd.

== The district contained the following civil parishes ==
- Brynford
- Caerwys
- Cilcain
- Gwaenysgor
- Halkyn
- Holywell Rural
- Llanasa
- Mold Rural
- Nercwys
- Northop
- Nannerch
- Newmarket
- Whitford
- Ysceifiog
