= Idwal Davies =

Notable people named Idwal Davies include:

- Idwal Davies (footballer) (1899–1980), Welsh footballer
- Idwal Davies (rugby) (1915–1990), Welsh dual-code rugby player
