= Lixwm =

Village in Flintshire, Wales

Coordinates: 53.233°N 3.247°W

Lixwm: Welsh: Licswm
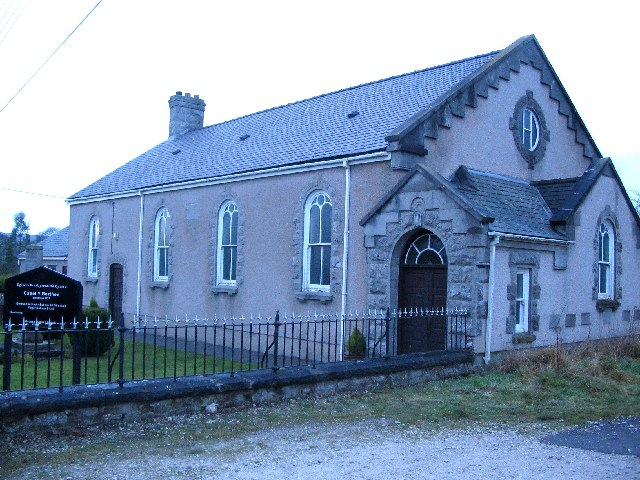
- Capel y Berthen, a Welsh Presbyterian chapel, in Lixwm

- Location within Flintshire
- Population: 910 (2021)
- OS grid reference: SJ167714
- Community: Ysceifiog
- Principal area: Flintshire
- Preserved county: Clwyd
- Country: Wales
- Sovereign state: United Kingdom
- Post town: HOLYWELL
- Postcode district: CH8
- Dialling code: 01352
- Police: North Wales
- Fire: North Wales
- Ambulance: Welsh
- UK Parliament: Clwyd East
- Senedd Cymru – Welsh Parliament: Delyn

Lixwm (Welsh: Licswm) is a small village in Flintshire, Wales. It is part of the community of Ysceifiog.

Lixwm was formerly a mining village, and one explanation of its unusual name was that it was given to it by miners who moved to the area from Derbyshire: in their dialect "likesome", or "licksome", was an adjective meaning "pleasant". It may have been referred to as Lixwm Green, or Lixum Green, for a period in the 19th century.

Samuel Lewis's 1843 Topographical Dictionary of Wales noted that at that time the majority of the population of Ysceifiog parish lived in Lixwm and were mainly employed in mines in the neighbouring parishes. Even at that time, however, the population was declining due to the closure of some mines.
