= Babell =

Hamlet in Flintshire, Wales

Coordinates: 53.24°N 03.27°W

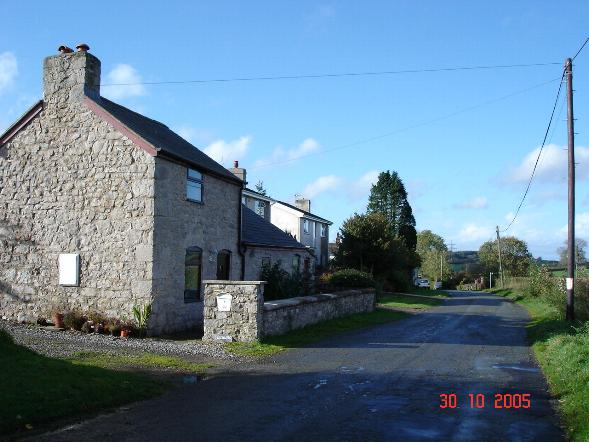
- Babell, Flintshire

- Location within Flintshire
- OS grid reference: SJ1573
- Community: Ysceifiog
- Principal area: Flintshire
- Preserved county: Clwyd
- Country: Wales
- Sovereign state: United Kingdom
- Post town: HOLYWELL
- Postcode district: CH8
- Dialling code: 01352
- Police: North Wales
- Fire: North Wales
- Ambulance: Welsh
- UK Parliament: Clwyd East
- Senedd Cymru – Welsh Parliament: Delyn

Babell is a hamlet in Flintshire, Wales. It is part of the community of Ysgeifiog.

The hamlet takes its name from the Babell Methodist chapel, built in 1836, but the surrounding area, a township of Ysgeifiog parish, was formerly known as Gelliloveday or Gellilyfdy. The name was recorded in the Domesday Book in the form "Cheslilaved", and as "Kelliloveday" in 1602. It has been suggested to mean "wych elm wood" (from Welsh gelli, "wood", and llwyv, llwyfanen, "wych elm"), but the placename scholar Ellis Davies stated that it probably came from the personal name "Loveday", ("Lyfdy"): "Loveday's wood".

There is a section of the ancient earthwork Offa's Dyke nearby Llyn-Ddu. Although rural the area is dotted with old copper workings from the 19th century.

The notable 17th-century antiquary John Jones lived at the hall of Gellilyfdy, to the west of the present-day village.
