= 2022 Flintshire County Council election =

Welsh local election

- 5 May 2022

All 67 seats on Flintshire County Council 34 seats needed for a majority

| | First party | Second party |
|---|---|---|
| Leader | Ian Roberts |
| Party | Labour | Independent |
| Seats before | 34 | 27 |
| Seats after | 31 | 30 |
| | Third party | Fourth party |
| Leader | Hilary McGuill | Clive Carver |
| Party | Liberal Democrats | Conservative |
| Seats before | 4 | 5 |
| Seats after | 4 | 2 |
Leader before election
Ian Roberts
Labour
No overall control
Leader after election
Ian Roberts
Labour
No overall control

The 2022 Flintshire County Council election took place on 5 May 2022 to elect all 67 councillors on Flintshire County Council in Wales, as part of the 2022 Welsh local elections.

The council remained under no overall control, being run by Labour as a minority administration.

== Overview ==
Prior to the election, Labour held 34 of the 70 seats and ran the council with the support of some of the independent councillors. Of the 27 independent councillors prior to the election, 16 sat together as the "Independent Alliance" led by Mike Peers, 3 formed the "New Independents" led by Patrick Heesom, and 3 formed the "Independent Group" led by Tony Sharps. Independent councillor Andy Hughes sat with the Liberal Democrats, and the other four independent councillors were not aligned to any group.

New ward boundaries took effect for this election, reducing the number of seats from 70 to 67.

The election saw the council remain under no overall control, but with Labour remaining the largest party, taking 31 of the 67 seats. Labour managed to form a minority administration after the election with informal support from the Liberal Democrats.

== Results ==
Results
| Party | Seats | Change |
|---|---|---|
| Labour Party | 31 | ▼2 |
| Independents | 30 | ▲8 |
| Liberal Democrats | 4 | ▼1 |
| Conservative Party | 2 | ▼5 |

Seat change compared to notional standing of parties prior to the election, as reduction in number of seats precludes direct comparison.

== Ward results ==
The results for each ward were:

=== Argoed and New Brighton ===
Argoed and New Brighton ward (2 seats)
| Party | Candidate | Votes | % | ±% |
|---|---|---|---|---|
| Liberal Democrats | Hilary June McGuill | 845 | 47.0 | |
| Liberal Democrats | Mared Brooks Eastwood | 843 | 46.9 | |
| Labour | Graham John Sherwood | 577 | 32.1 | |
| Plaid Cymru | Jack William Morris | 344 | 19.1 | |
| Independent | Chesleigh Kearbey | 341 | 19.0 | |
| Green | Paul Andrew Jewell | 242 | 13.5 | |
| Turnout | | 1,798 | | |
| Liberal Democrats win (new seat) | | | | |
| Liberal Democrats win (new seat) | | | | |

=== Bagillt ===
Bagillt ward (2 seats)
| Party | Candidate | Votes | % | ±% |
|---|---|---|---|---|
| Independent | Rob Davies | 653 | 69.0 | |
| Labour | Kevin Rush | 491 | 51.8 | |
| Green | David Binns | 104 | 11.0 | |
| Turnout | | 947 | | |
| Independent win (new seat) | | | | |
| Labour win (new seat) | | | | |

=== Broughton North East ===
Broughton North East ward
| Party | Candidate | Votes | % | ±% |
|---|---|---|---|---|
| Labour | Billy Mullin | 292 | 63.6 | |
| Independent | Arthur Barrie Gregory | 101 | 22.0 | |
| Conservative | Raphaelle Soffe | 66 | 14.4 | |
| Turnout | | 459 | | |
| Labour win (new seat) | | | | |

=== Broughton South ===
Broughton South ward (2 seats)
| Party | Candidate | Votes | % | ±% |
|---|---|---|---|---|
| Independent | Chrissy Gee | 566 | 50.3 | |
| Labour | Ryan James McKeown | 514 | 45.6 | |
| Labour | Mike Lowe | 401 | 35.6 | |
| Independent | Penny Brett-Roberts | 239 | 21.2 | |
| Conservative | Duncan Clubbe | 201 | 17.9 | |
| Turnout | | 1,126 | | |
| Independent win (new seat) | | | | |
| Labour win (new seat) | | | | |

According to Flintshire People’s Voice, Councillor Chrissy Gee joined the party in June 2025. She is listed as a member of Flintshire People’s Voice on the council’s website.

=== Brynford and Halkyn ===
Brynford and Halkyn ward (2 seats)
| Party | Candidate | Votes | % | ±% |
|---|---|---|---|---|
| Labour | Simon Jones | 659 | 53.5 | |
| Conservative | Jean Sophia Davies | 500 | 40.6 | |
| Independent | Colin Legg | 499 | 40.5 | |
| Conservative | Ray Faulder-Jones | 316 | 25.6 | |
| Turnout | | 1,232 | | |
| Labour win (new seat) | | | | |
| Conservative win (new seat) | | | | |

=== Buckley: Bistre East ===
Buckley: Bistre East ward (2 seats)
| Party | Candidate | Votes | % | ±% |
|---|---|---|---|---|
| Independent | Richard Brent Jones | 815 | 64.8 | |
| Independent | Arnold Woolley | 627 | 49.8 | |
| Labour | Adie Drury | 376 | 29.9 | |
| Labour | Vivienne Elizabeth Blondek | 305 | 24.2 | |
| Turnout | | 1,258 | | |
| Independent win (new seat) | | | | |
| Independent win (new seat) | | | | |

=== Buckley: Bistre West ===
Buckley: Bistre West ward (2 seats)
| Party | Candidate | Votes | % | ±% |
|---|---|---|---|---|
| Labour | Carolyn Mary Preece | 526 | 52.9 | |
| Labour | Dan Rose | 507 | 51.0 | |
| Independent | David John Ellis | 492 | 49.4 | |
| Turnout | | 995 | | |
| Labour win (new seat) | | | | |
| Labour win (new seat) | | | | |

In May 2024, Carolyn Preece and Dan Rose left the Labour Party to join Flintshire People's Voice.

=== Buckley: Mountain ===
Buckley: Mountain ward
| Party | Candidate | Votes | % | ±% |
|---|---|---|---|---|
| Independent | Carol Ann Ellis | 505 | 71.3 | |
| Labour | Kenneth Harry Preece | 203 | 28.7 | |
| Turnout | | 708 | | |
| Independent win (new seat) | | | | |

=== Buckley: Pentrobin ===
Buckley: Pentrobin ward (2 seats)
| Party | Candidate | Votes | % | ±% |
|---|---|---|---|---|
| Independent | Henry Dennis Hutchinson (Dennis Hutchinson) | 956 | 62.0 | |
| Independent | Mike Peers | 930 | 60.3 | |
| Labour | Emma Louise Preece | 475 | 30.8 | |
| Labour | Dan Preece | 446 | 28.9 | |
| Turnout | | 1,542 | | |
| Independent win (new seat) | | | | |
| Independent win (new seat) | | | | |

=== Caergwrle ===
Caergwrle ward
| Party | Candidate | Votes | % | ±% |
|---|---|---|---|---|
| Labour | Dave Healey | 275 | 76.8 | |
| Independent | Suzanne Foy | 83 | 23.2 | |
| Turnout | | 358 | | |
| Labour win (new seat) | | | | |

=== Caerwys ===
Caerwys ward
| Party | Candidate | Votes | % | ±% |
|---|---|---|---|---|
| Independent | Steve Copple | uncontested | | |
| Independent win (new seat) | | | | |

=== Cilcain ===
Cilcain ward
| Party | Candidate | Votes | % | ±% |
|---|---|---|---|---|
| Liberal Democrats | Andrew John Parkhurst | 534 | 61.3 | |
| Independent | Owen Thomas | 226 | 25.9 | |
| Labour | Aled Hanson | 111 | 12.7 | |
| Turnout | | 871 | | |
| Liberal Democrats win (new seat) | | | | |

=== Connah's Quay Central ===
Connah's Quay Central ward (2 seats)
| Party | Candidate | Votes | % | ±% |
|---|---|---|---|---|
| Independent | Bernie Attridge | 780 | 66.0 | |
| Independent | Debbie Owen | 626 | 53.0 | |
| Labour | Ryan O'Gorman | 403 | 34.1 | |
| Labour | Tracey Sutton Postlethwaite | 308 | 26.1 | |
| Turnout | | 1,181 | | |
| Independent win (new seat) | | | | |
| Independent win (new seat) | | | | |

=== Connah's Quay South ===
Connah's Quay South ward (2 seats)
| Party | Candidate | Votes | % | ±% |
|---|---|---|---|---|
| Independent | Bill Crease | 524 | 49.5 | |
| Independent | Antony Stephen Wren | 453 | 42.8 | |
| Labour | Alexander Ian Dunbar (Ian Dunbar) | 450 | 42.5 | |
| Labour | Ian Robertson Smith | 346 | 32.7 | |
| Liberal Democrats | Steven David Tattum | 115 | 10.9 | |
| Turnout | | 1,058 | | |
| Independent win (new seat) | | | | |
| Independent win (new seat) | | | | |

=== Connah's Quay: Golftyn ===
Connah's Quay: Golftyn ward (2 seats)
| Party | Candidate | Votes | % | ±% |
|---|---|---|---|---|
| Independent | Andy Hughes | 695 | 61.2 | |
| Independent | David Richardson (Franko Richardson) | 607 | 53.4 | |
| Labour | Paul Andrew Shotton | 371 | 32.7 | |
| Labour | Beverley Futia | 333 | 29.3 | |
| Reform | Dave Vernon | 52 | 4.6 | |
| Turnout | | 1,136 | | |
| Independent win (new seat) | | | | |
| Independent win (new seat) | | | | |

=== Connah's Quay: Wepre ===
Connah's Quay: Wepre ward
| Party | Candidate | Votes | % | ±% |
|---|---|---|---|---|
| Independent | Roz Mansell | 250 | 46.3 | |
| Labour | Martin Gerard White | 233 | 43.1 | |
| Liberal Democrats | Marie Goble | 35 | 6.5 | |
| Green | Katie O'Connor | 22 | 4.1 | |
| Turnout | | 540 | | |
| Independent win (new seat) | | | | |

=== Flint: Castle ===
Flint: Castle ward
| Party | Candidate | Votes | % | ±% |
|---|---|---|---|---|
| Labour | Ian Roberts | 314 | 68.7 | |
| Independent | Steve Jones | 121 | 26.5 | |
| Green | Kathryn Price | 22 | 4.8 | |
| Turnout | | 457 | | |
| Labour win (new seat) | | | | |

=== Flint: Coleshill and Trelawny ===
Flint: Coleshill and Trelawny ward (3 seats)
| Party | Candidate | Votes | % | ±% |
|---|---|---|---|---|
| Labour | Paul Cunningham | 1,062 | 54.1 | |
| Labour | Vicky Perfect | 1,042 | 53.1 | |
| Labour | Michelle Perfect | 950 | 48.4 | |
| Independent | Karl Jones | 631 | 32.1 | |
| Independent | Carol Ann Griffiths | 560 | 28.5 | |
| Conservative | Nefyn Roberts | 477 | 24.3 | |
| Turnout | | 1,963 | | |
| Labour win (new seat) | | | | |
| Labour win (new seat) | | | | |
| Labour win (new seat) | | | | |

=== Flint: Oakenholt ===
Flint: Oakenholt ward
| Party | Candidate | Votes | % | ±% |
|---|---|---|---|---|
| Labour | Mel Buckley | 337 | 55.7 | |
| Independent | Rita Johnson | 268 | 44.3 | |
| Turnout | | 605 | | |
| Labour win (new seat) | | | | |

=== Greenfield ===
Greenfield ward
| Party | Candidate | Votes | % | ±% |
|---|---|---|---|---|
| Independent | Rosetta Dolphin | 418 | 61.9 | |
| Conservative | Matt Sprake | 135 | 20.0 | |
| Labour | Mike Jones | 122 | 18.1 | |
| Turnout | | 675 | | |
| Independent win (new seat) | | | | |

=== Gwernaffield and Gwernymynydd ===
Gwernaffield and Gwernymynydd ward (2 seats)
| Party | Candidate | Votes | % | ±% |
|---|---|---|---|---|
| Liberal Democrats | David Coggins Cogan | 589 | 41.0 | |
| Conservative | Adele Joy Davies-Cooke | 490 | 34.1 | |
| Labour | Huw Claydon | 439 | 30.6 | |
| Conservative | Kathy Cracknell | 299 | 20.8 | |
| Liberal Democrats | Klara Lethbridge | 298 | 20.8 | |
| Independent | Saffron Deri Hulson | 249 | 17.3 | |
| Green | Christopher Harris | 183 | 12.7 | |
| Turnout | | 1,436 | | |
| Liberal Democrats win (new seat) | | | | |
| Conservative win (new seat) | | | | |

=== Hawarden: Aston ===
Hawarden: Aston ward (2 seats)
| Party | Candidate | Votes | % | ±% |
|---|---|---|---|---|
| Labour | Gillian Louise Brockley | 784 | 57.0 | |
| Independent | Helen Brown | 767 | 55.8 | |
| Independent | George Hardcastle | 559 | 40.7 | |
| Turnout | | 1,375 | | |
| Labour win (new seat) | | | | |
| Independent win (new seat) | | | | |

In May 2024, Gillian Brockley left the Labour Party to join Flintshire People's Voice. In April 2026, Helen Brown joined Reform UK.

=== Hawarden: Ewloe ===
Hawarden: Ewloe ward (2 seats)
| Party | Candidate | Votes | % | ±% |
|---|---|---|---|---|
| Independent | Dave Mackie | 859 | 52.3 | |
| Labour | Linda Thomas | 527 | 32.1 | |
| Conservative | Lesley Evans | 475 | 28.9 | |
| Independent | Janet Anne Axworthy | 448 | 27.3 | |
| Liberal Democrats | Christopher Goble | 246 | 15.0 | |
| Turnout | | 1,644 | | |
| Independent win (new seat) | | | | |
| Labour win (new seat) | | | | |

=== Hawarden: Mancot ===
Hawarden: Mancot ward (2 seats)
| Party | Candidate | Votes | % | ±% |
|---|---|---|---|---|
| Labour | Sam Swash | 881 | 61.2 | |
| Independent | Ant Turton | 855 | 59.4 | |
| Independent | Ralph Small | 479 | 33.3 | |
| Independent | George Chawner | 168 | 11.7 | |
| Turnout | | 1,439 | | |
| Labour win (new seat) | | | | |
| Independent win (new seat) | | | | |

In May 2024, Sam Swash left the Labour Party to join Flintshire People's Voice.

=== Higher Kinnerton ===
Higher Kinnerton ward
| Party | Candidate | Votes | % | ±% |
|---|---|---|---|---|
| Independent | Mike Allport | uncontested | | |
| Independent win (new seat) | | | | |

=== Holywell Central ===
Holywell Central ward
| Party | Candidate | Votes | % | ±% |
|---|---|---|---|---|
| Labour | Ted Palmer | 224 | 50.1 | |
| Independent | Daniel Thomas | 223 | 49.9 | |
| Turnout | | 447 | | |
| Labour win (new seat) | | | | |

=== Holywell East ===
Holywell East ward
| Party | Candidate | Votes | % | ±% |
|---|---|---|---|---|
| Independent | Ian Hodge | 252 | 45.2 | |
| Labour | Joe Johnson | 198 | 35.5 | |
| Conservative | Emma Ward | 59 | 10.6 | |
| Liberal Democrats | Theresa Murray | 49 | 8.8 | |
| Turnout | | 558 | | |
| Independent win (new seat) | | | | |

In April 2026, Ian Hodge joined Reform UK.

=== Holywell West ===
Holywell West ward
| Party | Candidate | Votes | % | ±% |
|---|---|---|---|---|
| Labour | Paul Anthony Johnson | 324 | 55.7 | |
| Independent | Lynda Ann Carter | 258 | 44.3 | |
| Turnout | | 582 | | |
| Labour win (new seat) | | | | |

=== Hope ===
Hope ward
| Party | Candidate | Votes | % | ±% |
|---|---|---|---|---|
| Labour | Gladys Healey | 496 | 75.2 | |
| Independent | John Edward Dickin | 164 | 24.8 | |
| Turnout | | 660 | | |
| Labour win (new seat) | | | | |

=== Leeswood ===
Leeswood ward
| Party | Candidate | Votes | % | ±% |
|---|---|---|---|---|
| Labour | Ray Hughes | 425 | 60.6 | |
| Independent | Joseph Caruana | 174 | 24.8 | |
| Independent | Shaun Owen | 102 | 14.6 | |
| Turnout | | 701 | | |
| Labour win (new seat) | | | | |

Ray Hughes died in October 2025, leading to a by-election on 22 January 2026 which was won by Reform UK.

=== Llanasa and Trelawnyd ===
Llanasa and Trelawnyd ward (2 seats)
| Party | Candidate | Votes | % | ±% |
|---|---|---|---|---|
| Independent | Glyn Spencer Banks | 698 | 42.1 | |
| Labour | Gina Maddison | 589 | 35.5 | |
| Independent | Tom Beal | 531 | 32.0 | |
| Conservative | Timothy James Garner Roberts | 527 | 31.8 | |
| Green | Rachel Bolger | 292 | 17.6 | |
| Turnout | | 1,659 | | |
| Independent win (new seat) | | | | |
| Labour win (new seat) | | | | |

=== Llanfyndd ===
Llanfynydd ward
| Party | Candidate | Votes | % | ±% |
|---|---|---|---|---|
| Labour | Dave Hughes | 450 | 65.5 | |
| Independent | Tim Holt | 237 | 34.5 | |
| Turnout | | 687 | | |
| Labour win (new seat) | | | | |

=== Mold East ===
Mold East ward
| Party | Candidate | Votes | % | ±% |
|---|---|---|---|---|
| Labour | Chris Bithell | 544 | 72.0 | |
| Independent | Paul Beacher | 212 | 28.0 | |
| Turnout | | 756 | | |
| Labour win (new seat) | | | | |

=== Mold South ===
Mold South ward
| Party | Candidate | Votes | % | ±% |
|---|---|---|---|---|
| Labour | Geoff Collett | 447 | 40.5 | |
| Independent | Haydn Wynne Jones | 385 | 34.8 | |
| Plaid Cymru | Bob Gaffey | 124 | 11.2 | |
| Liberal Democrats | Edward David Goble | 108 | 9.8 | |
| Green | David Anthony Blainey | 41 | 3.7 | |
| Turnout | | 1,105 | | |
| Labour win (new seat) | | | | |

=== Mold West ===
Mold West ward
| Party | Candidate | Votes | % | ±% |
|---|---|---|---|---|
| Labour | Tina Susan Claydon | 276 | 44.9 | |
| Independent | Brian Lloyd | 207 | 33.7 | |
| Liberal Democrats | Joanne Edwards | 76 | 12.4 | |
| Independent | Geoffrey Matthias | 56 | 9.1 | |
| Turnout | | 615 | | |
| Labour win (new seat) | | | | |

=== Mold: Broncoed ===
Mold: Broncoed ward
| Party | Candidate | Votes | % | ±% |
|---|---|---|---|---|
| Labour | Teresa Carberry | 345 | 39.7 | |
| Independent | Haydn Bateman | 308 | 35.4 | |
| Independent | Gareth Derek Williams | 143 | 16.5 | |
| Conservative | Tim Maunders | 73 | 8.4 | |
| Turnout | | 869 | | |
| Labour win (new seat) | | | | |

=== Mostyn ===
Mostyn ward
| Party | Candidate | Votes | % | ±% |
|---|---|---|---|---|
| Independent | Pam Banks | 268 | 49.3 | |
| Independent | Patrick Glynn Heesom | 125 | 23.0 | |
| Liberal Democrats | Heather Alison Prydderch | 53 | 9.7 | |
| Conservative | Les Waymont | 52 | 9.6 | |
| Green | Lee Lavery | 46 | 8.5 | |
| Turnout | | 544 | | |
| Independent win (new seat) | | | | |

=== Northop ===
Northop ward (2 seats)
| Party | Candidate | Votes | % | ±% |
|---|---|---|---|---|
| Independent | Marion Bateman | 779 | 38.5 | |
| Independent | Linda Thew | 736 | 36.4 | |
| Labour | Ben Goldsborough | 617 | 30.5 | |
| Independent | Paul Ian Ashley | 417 | 20.6 | |
| Independent | Tony Sharps | 395 | 19.5 | |
| Liberal Democrats | Uzma Sikander | 330 | 16.3 | |
| Turnout | | 2,021 | | |
| Independent win (new seat) | | | | |
| Independent win (new seat) | | | | |

=== Pen-y-ffordd ===
Pen-y-ffordd ward (2 seats)
| Party | Candidate | Votes | % | ±% |
|---|---|---|---|---|
| Independent | Roy Alan Wakelam | 785 | 56.5 | |
| Labour | Alasdair Ibbotson | 764 | 55.0 | |
| Independent | David Williams | 626 | 45.0 | |
| Labour | David Walker | 362 | 26.0 | |
| Turnout | | 1,390 | | |
| Independent win (new seat) | | | | |
| Labour win (new seat) | | | | |

In May 2024, Alasdair Ibbotson left the Labour Party to join Flintshire People's Voice.

=== Queensferry and Sealand ===
Queensferry and Sealand ward (2 seats)
| Party | Candidate | Votes | % | ±% |
|---|---|---|---|---|
| Labour | Christine Margaret Jones | 518 | 47.2 | |
| Independent | Dale Selvester | 466 | 42.4 | |
| Independent | Lesley Povey | 396 | 36.1 | |
| Labour | David Edward Wisinger | 396 | 36.1 | |
| Conservative | Roger Francis Cracknell | 135 | 12.3 | |
| Liberal Democrats | Lionel Prouve | 58 | 5.3 | |
| Turnout | | 1,098 | | |
| Labour win (new seat) | | | | |
| Independent win (new seat) | | | | |

=== Saltney Ferry ===
Saltney Ferry ward (2 seats)
| Party | Candidate | Votes | % | ±% |
|---|---|---|---|---|
| Labour | Thomas Richard Lloyd (Richard Lloyd) | 590 | 58.2 | |
| Independent | Jason Shallcross | 407 | 40.1 | |
| Labour | Shelly Streeter | 359 | 35.4 | |
| Independent | Eileen Veronica Gay (Veronica Gay) | 319 | 31.5 | |
| Conservative | Kinza Sutton | 106 | 10.5 | |
| Turnout | | 1,014 | | |
| Labour win (new seat) | | | | |
| Independent win (new seat) | | | | |

=== Shotton East and Shotton Higher ===
Shotton East and Shotton Higher ward (2 seats)
| Party | Candidate | Votes | % | ±% |
|---|---|---|---|---|
| Labour | David Evans | 413 | 51.3 | |
| Labour | Ron Davies | 396 | 49.2 | |
| Independent | Michael John Evans | 359 | 44.6 | |
| Independent | Kelly Joanne Evans-Brown | 275 | 34.2 | |
| Turnout | | 805 | | |
| Labour win (new seat) | | | | |
| Labour win (new seat) | | | | |

=== Shotton West ===
Shotton West ward
| Party | Candidate | Votes | % | ±% |
|---|---|---|---|---|
| Labour | Sean Bibby | 496 | 76.5 | |
| Independent | Steve Biffo Griffiths | 152 | 23.5 | |
| Turnout | | 648 | | |
| Labour win (new seat) | | | | |

=== Treuddyn ===
Treuddyn ward
| Party | Candidate | Votes | % | ±% |
|---|---|---|---|---|
| Independent | Allan Marshall | 277 | 51.1 | |
| Labour | Eva Bech | 247 | 45.6 | |
| Independent | Jonny Sheppard | 18 | 3.3 | |
| Turnout | | 542 | | |
| Independent win (new seat) | | | | |

=== Whitford ===
Whitford ward
| Party | Candidate | Votes | % | ±% |
|---|---|---|---|---|
| Independent | Chris Dolphin | 635 | 78.3 | |
| Labour | Helen Papworth | 176 | 21.7 | |
| Turnout | | 811 | | |
| Independent win (new seat) | | | | |

== By-elections ==
=== Leeswood ===
Leeswood by-election: 22 January 2026
| Party | Candidate | Votes | % | ±% |
|---|---|---|---|---|
| Reform | Kristian Salkeld | 160 | 22.3 | N/A |
| Independent | Joseph Caruana | 138 | 19.2 | ▼5.6 |
| Independent | David Rule | 135 | 18.8 | N/A |
| Labour | Ray Thomas | 87 | 12.1 | ▼48.5 |
| FPV | Allison Davies | 79 | 11 | N/A |
| Liberal Democrats | Richard Sefton | 68 | 9.5 | N/A |
| Conservative | Oliver Wilson | 34 | 4.7 | N/A |
| Independent | Shaun Owen | 17 | 2.4 | ▼12.2 |
| Turnout | | 718 | | |
| Reform gain from Labour | | Swing | | |

The by-election was caused by the death of Labour councillor Ray Hughes on 25 October 2025. Kristian Salkeld became Flintshire's first Reform UK councillor.

=== Argoed & New Brighton ===
Argoed and New Brighton by-election: 9 July 2026
| Party | Candidate | Votes | % | ±% |
|---|---|---|---|---|
| Liberal Democrats | Faron Hadfield-Jones | 614 | 39.8 | ▲3.8 |
| Reform | Angela Hughes | 490 | 31.7 | New |
| Plaid Cymru | Jack Morris | 191 | 12.4 | ▼2.2 |
| Conservative | Hazel Pamela Lynes | 113 | 7.3 | New |
| Labour | Peter Agnew | 113 | 7.3 | ▼17.3 |
| Green | Meilir Devine Roberts | 23 | 1.5 | ▼8.8 |
| Majority | | 124 | 8.1 | |
| Turnout | | 1,545 | | |
| Liberal Democrats hold | | Swing | | |

The by-election was caused by the death of Liberal Democrat councillor Hilary McGuill.

=== Higher Kinnerton ===
Higher Kinnerton by-election: 15 October 2026
| Party | Candidate | Votes | % | ±% |
|---|---|---|---|---|
| FPV | Josh Swash | 566 | 91.3 | N/A |
| Reform | Carl Mather | 21 | 3.4 | N/A |
| Conservative | Oliver Wilson | 21 | 3.4 | N/A |
| Heritage | Kristina Renshaw | 10 | 1.6 | N/A |
| Independent | Penny Brett-Roberts | 2 | 0.3 | N/A |
| Majority | | 545 | 87.9 | N/A |
| Turnout | | 620 | 42.8 | N/A |
| FPV gain from Independent | | Swing | | |

The by-election was caused by the resignation of Independent councillor Mike Allport.

=== Mold: Broncoed ===
Mold: Broncoed by-election: 26 November 2026
| Party | Candidate | Votes | % | ±% |
|---|---|---|---|---|
| Reform | Richard Clarke | | | |
| Conservative | Kathy Cracknell | | | |
| Liberal Democrats | Nanette Davies | | | |
| Green | Emily Hart | | | |
| Restore | Ted Jenkins | | | |
| Labour | Laura Murton | | | |
| Heritage | Kristina Renshaw | | | |
| Majority | | | | |
| Turnout | | | | |
| | | Swing | | |
