= Alyn and Deeside =

Alyn and Deeside may refer to:

- Alyn and Deeside (UK Parliament constituency)
- Alyn and Deeside (Senedd constituency)
- Alyn and Deeside (district), the former local government district in what is now Flintshire
