= Ysceifiog =

Village and community in Flintshire, Wales

- Village and community
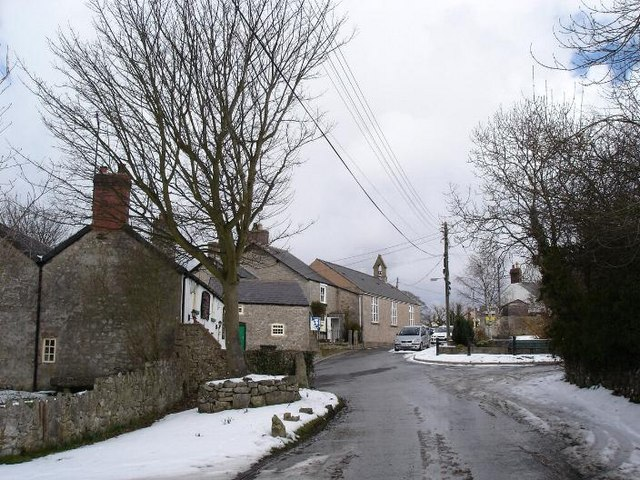
- The village

- Location within Flintshire
- Population: 1,247 (2021)
- OS grid reference: SJ151714
- Community: Ysceifiog
- Principal area: Flintshire
- Preserved county: Clwyd
- Country: Wales
- Sovereign state: United Kingdom
- Settlements: Babell, Lixwm, Ysceifiog
- Post town: MOLD
- Postcode district: CH7
- Post town: HOLYWELL
- Postcode district: CH8
- Dialling code: 01352
- Police: North Wales
- Fire: North Wales
- Ambulance: Welsh
- UK Parliament: Clwyd East
- Senedd Cymru – Welsh Parliament: Delyn
- Website: ysceifiog.org.uk
- List of places UK Wales Flintshire 53.232°N 3.273°W Map of the community

Ysceifiog, also spelled as Ysgeifiog, is a village and community in Flintshire, Wales. It lies on a back road just north of the A541 highway between Nannerch and Caerwys. The name translates roughly as "a place where elder trees grow".

The community includes the villages of Lixwm, to the east of Ysceifiog village, and Babell, to the north.

== Governance ==
Ysceifiog Community Council consists of nine councillors, and is not divided into wards.

The Ysceifiog and Caerwys communities make up the Caerwys electoral ward on Flintshire County Council, which elects one councillor.

Ysceifiog is part of the Delyn constituency and North Wales region for the Senedd, and of the Delyn constituency for parliament.

== Notable residents ==
The antiquarian and copyist of Welsh manuscripts John Jones (c.1585-1657/8) was born and brought up in the small mansion of Gellilyfdy in Ysceifiog parish.

Thomas Wynne (1627–1692) was born in Ysceifiog, where his family dated back seventeen generations to Owain Gwynedd. Wynne became personal physician to William Penn and was one of the original settlers of Philadelphia in the Province of Pennsylvania. He also served as speaker for the first two Pennsylvania Assemblies of the Province in Philadelphia in 1687 and 1688.

The poet William Edwards (Wil Ysceifiog) also lived there in the first half of the 19th century, and John Owen (1733-1776), one of the pioneers of Methodism in Flintshire, was a native of Ysceifiog.

== Today ==
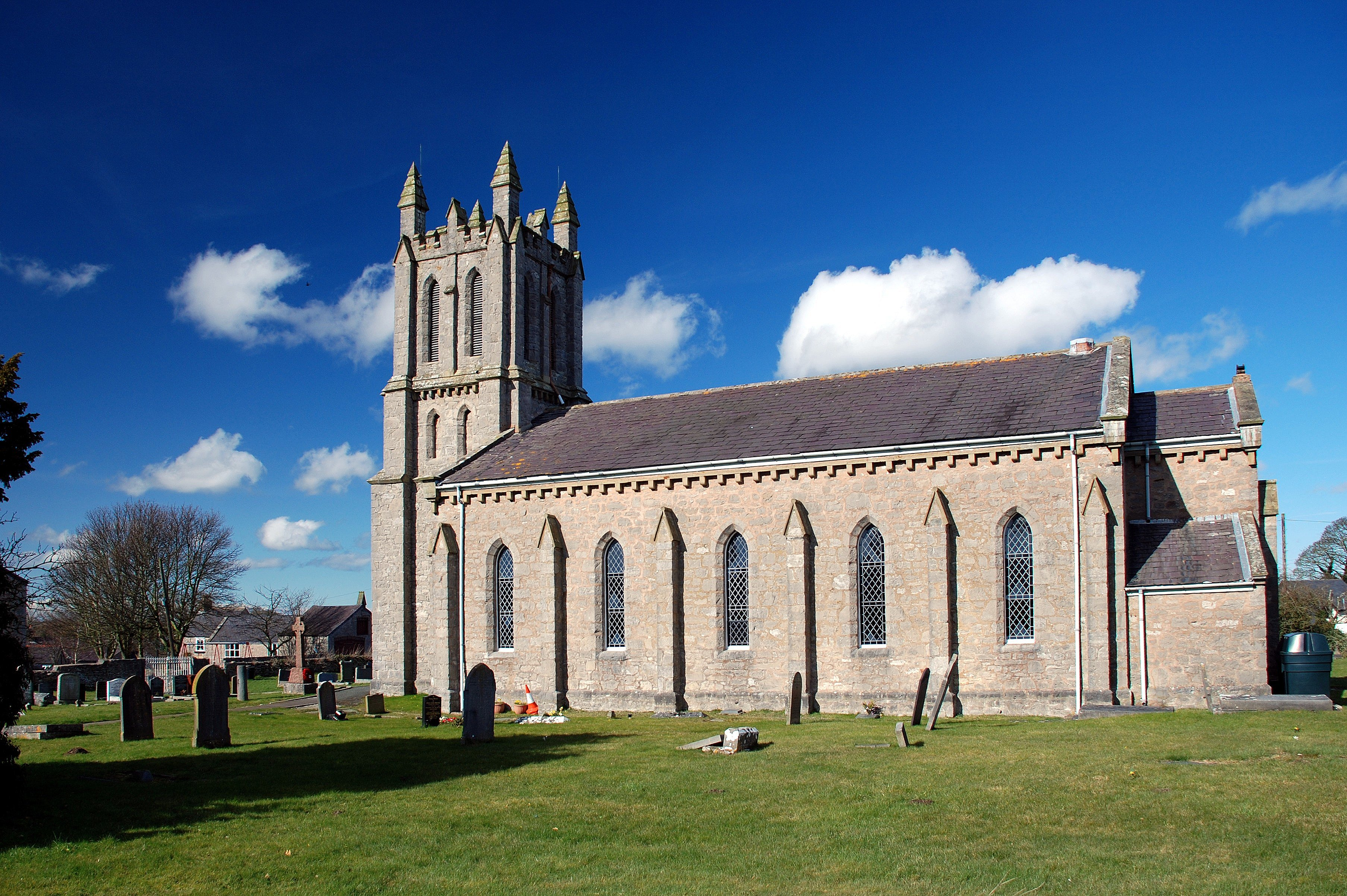
The church of St Mary is a Grade II listed building.

The village pub, the Fox Inn, is a substantially unaltered 18th century building, with a front room listed on CAMRA's register of nationally important pub interiors.

The village committee maintains the local village hall which plays hosts to village events.

The local football team, Ysceifiog F.C., joined the Llandyrnog & District Summer League in 1976. They won the knockout shield in 2007 and 2008, and the league title in 2008. Their catchment area also includes the villages of Lixwm and Nannerch, and the Brynford area was added in 2024.

Although taking the name of the village Ysceifiog Wolves JFC, a successful junior league football team coming runners up in the Tesco UK Championships in 2011.

== Sources ==
- Dewi Roberts The old villages of Denbighshire and Flintshire (Gwasg Carreg Gwalch. 1999) ISBN 0-86381-562-6
