= District of Delyn =

Former district of Clwyd, Wales

Coordinates: 53.267°N 3.176°W

Delyn
- Borough
- History
  - Created: 1 April 1974
  - Abolished: 31 March 1996
  - Succeeded by: Flintshire
  - HQ: Flint
- Contained within
  - County Council: Clwyd

Delyn was a local government district with borough status from 1974 to 1996, being one of six districts in the county of Clwyd, north-east Wales.

== History ==
The borough was created on 1 April 1974, under the Local Government Act 1972. It covered the area of four former districts from the administrative county of Flintshire, which were all abolished at the same time:

- Flint Municipal Borough
- Holywell Urban District
- Holywell Rural District
- Mold Urban District

The name "Delyn" was formed by combining the names of the area's principal rivers: the Dee and the Alyn. The neighbouring district was originally named Alyn-Dee for the same reason. "Y Delyn" is also Welsh for "The Harp", a fact reflected in the borough's coat of arms.

Delyn was twinned with Menden, Germany.

In 1996 the borough was abolished under the Local Government (Wales) Act 1994, which saw Clwyd County Council and its constituent districts abolished, being replaced by principal areas, whose councils perform the functions which had previously been divided between the county and district councils. The former Delyn area and neighbouring Alyn and Deeside merged to become the new Flintshire principal area with effect from 1 April 1996.

== Political control ==
The first election to the council was held in 1973, initially operating as a shadow authority alongside the outgoing authorities until it came into its powers on 1 April 1974. From 1974 until the council's abolition in 1996, political control was as follows:

Party in control	Years
Independent	1974–1979
No overall control	1979–1991
Independent	1991–1996

== Premises ==
The council inherited various offices from its predecessor authorities, including:

- Guildhall, Chapel Street, Flint (built 1966) from Flint Borough Council.
- Council Offices, Halkyn Road, Holywell, from Holywell Rural District Council.
- Civic Offices, Coleshill Street, Holywell (built 1970) from Holywell Urban District Council.
- Town Hall, Earl Road, Mold (built 1912) from Mold Urban District Council.

Initially the council's departments were divided among the various buildings. In the early 1980s the council built itself a new office called Delyn House on Chapel Street in Flint, opposite Flint Guildhall. Delyn House and Flint Guildhall (also known as Flint House) thereafter served as the council's main offices, with the Civic Offices in Holywell retaining some departments. After the council's abolition, the Civic Offices in Holywell were demolished in August 2002 to make way for a Lidl supermarket, which later opened in the summer of 2007 as a replacement of the nearby Kwik Save, and Flint Guildhall was demolished around the same time to make way for a block of flats. Delyn House was renamed County Offices and continues to serve as an area office of Flintshire County Council.
