= Sandy Mewies =

Welsh politician (born 1950)

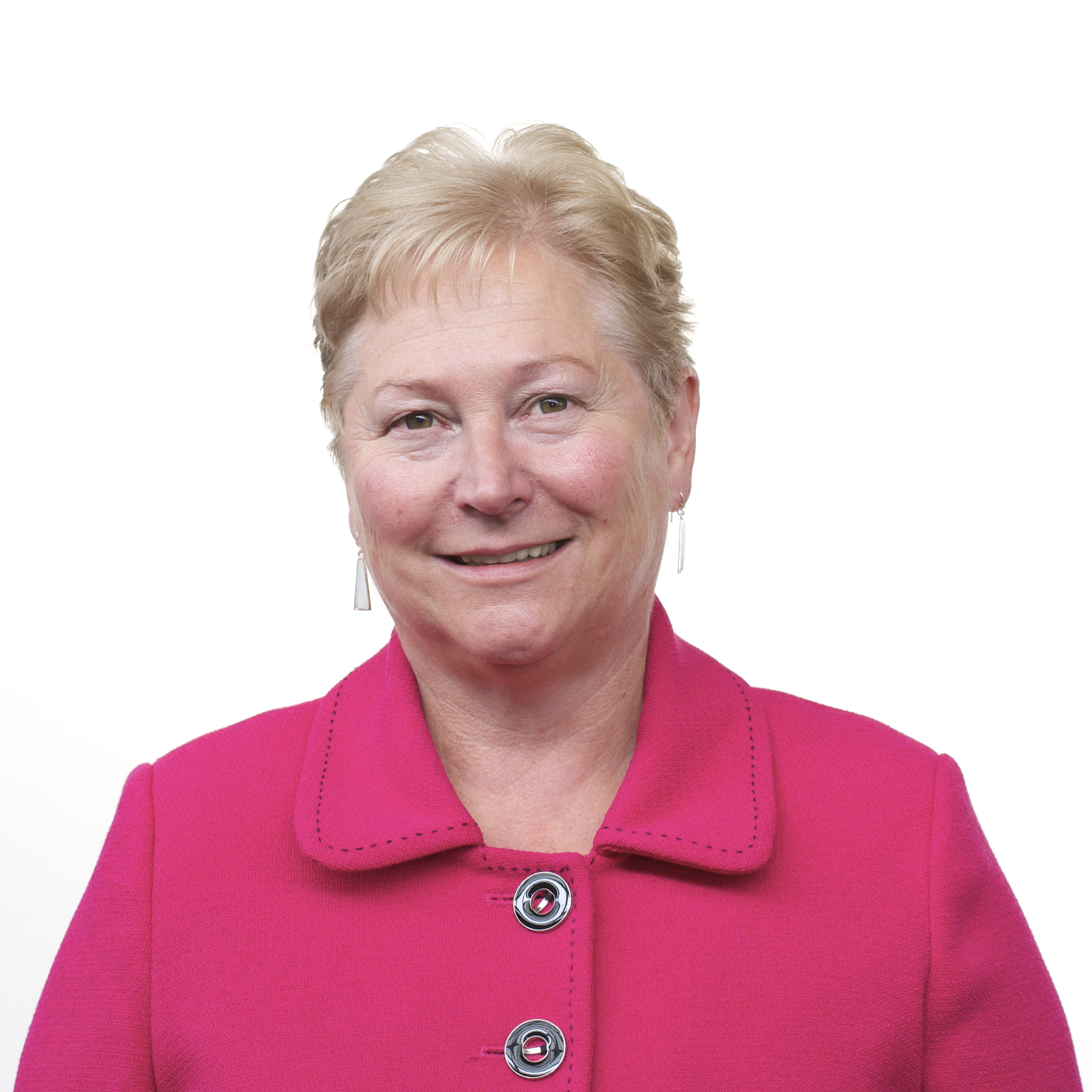

Member of the Welsh Assembly for Delyn
- In office 1 May 2003 – 6 April 2016
- Preceded by: Alison Halford
- Succeeded by: Hannah Blythyn
- Majority: 2,881 (12.4%)

Personal details
- Born: 19 February 1950 (age 76) Brymbo, Wrexham, Wales
- Party: Welsh Labour
- Education: Open University

Sandra (Sandy) Mewies AM (born 16 February 1950) is a Welsh Labour politician. Born in Brymbo, Wrexham, Mewies represented the constituency of Delyn at the National Assembly for Wales from her election in 2003 until 2016.

== Education ==
Grove Park Girls' Grammar School, Wrexham. Holds a degree from the Open University and is an Honorary Fellow of the North East Wales Institute. She has worked as a journalist, in the voluntary sector running the former Clwyd Community Care Federation and as a lay inspector of schools. She is a former director of the Wales European Centre in Brussels.

== Political career ==
County and community councillor, Wrexham for 16 years – she served as deputy leader and mayor.

She was elected to the National Assembly for Wales in 2003 as a Labour candidate to represent Delyn and re-elected in 2007 and again in 2011. At the 2011 election she joined the Labour Co-operative Assembly Group. She was Chair of the European and External Affairs Committee and sat on the Enterprise and Learning Committee.

Senedd
Preceded by Alison Halford	Assembly Member for Delyn; 2003–2016	Succeeded by Hannah Blythyn
