= Hannah Blythyn =

Welsh Labour politician and Member of the Senedd for Delyn

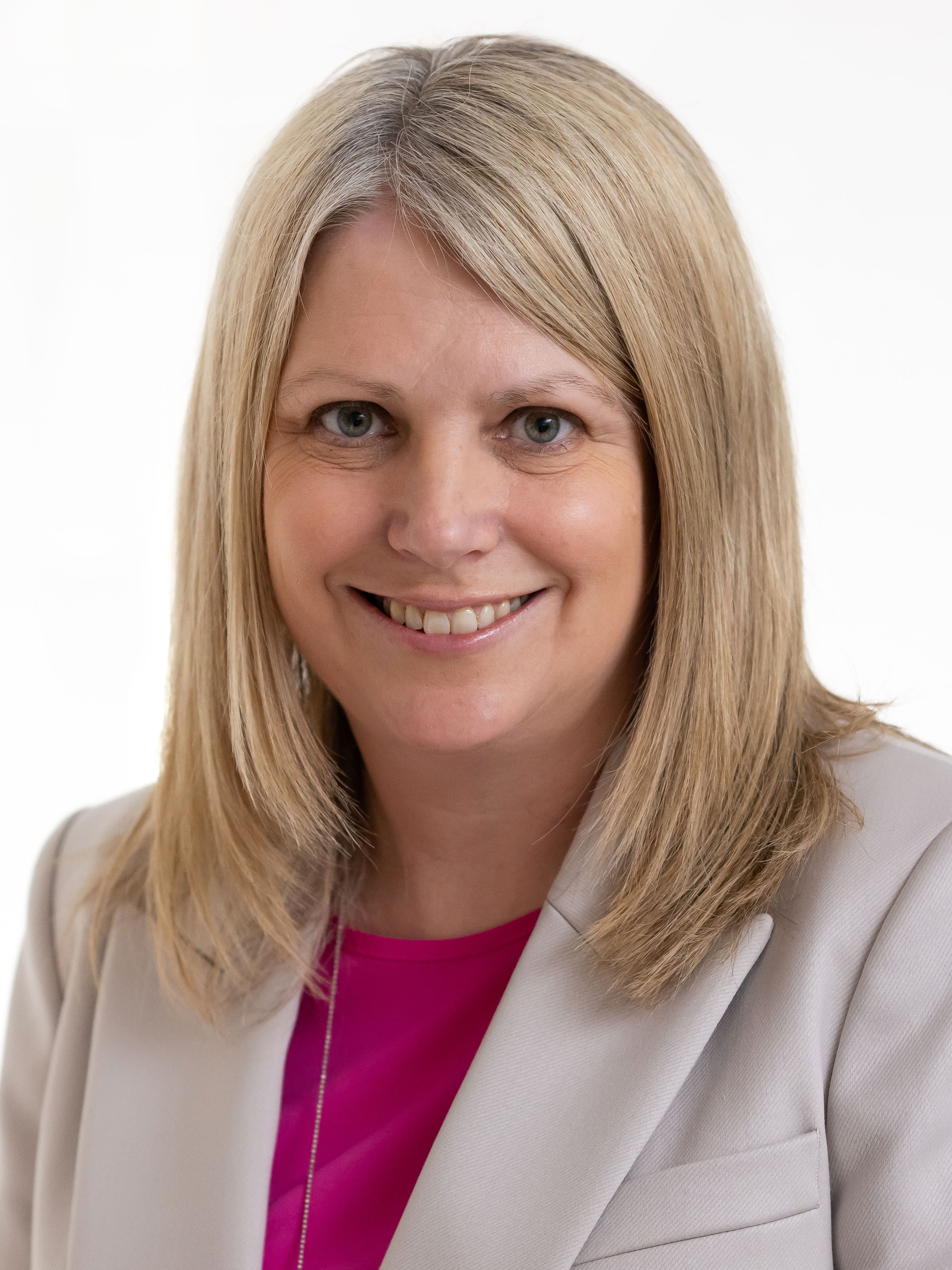
- Official portrait, 2024

Minister for Social Partnership (Note: As Deputy Minister for Social Partnership from 2021 to 2024)
- In office 13 May 2021 – 16 May 2024
- First Minister: Mark Drakeford; Vaughan Gething
- Preceded by: Office established
- Succeeded by: Sarah Murphy

Deputy Minister for Housing and Local Government
- In office 14 December 2018 – 13 May 2021
- First Minister: Mark Drakeford
- Preceded by: Rebecca Evans
- Succeeded by: Office abolished

Deputy Minister for Environment
- In office 3 November 2017 – 13 December 2018
- First Minister: Carwyn Jones

Member of the Senedd for Delyn
- In office 6 May 2016 – 8 April 2026
- Preceded by: Sandy Mewies
- Succeeded by: Constituency abolished

Personal details
- Born: 17 April 1979 (age 47)
- Party: Welsh Labour and Co-operative Party
- Education: St Richard Gwyn Catholic High School, Flint
- Alma mater: De Montfort University; City, University of London
- Occupation: Trade Unionist, Politician

Hannah Blythyn (born 17 April 1979) is a Welsh politician who served as the Minister for Social Partnership in the Welsh Government from 2021 to 2024. She was previously the Environment Minister from 2017 to 2018 and the Deputy Minister for Housing and Local Government from 2018 to 2021. A member of Welsh Labour and Co-operative Party, she was Member of the Senedd (MS) for Delyn from 2016 to 2026.

In the 2026 Senedd election she was an unsuccessful Labour candidate in the Clwyd constituency.

== Early life and education ==
Hannah Blythyn was born on 17 April 1979. Blythyn is from North Wales and grew up in a working-class community in Connah's Quay.

Blythyn went to St Richard Gwyn school in Flint. After leaving school, she studied English Literature at De Montfort University in Leicester. Blythyn also has a Masters in International Politics and Human Rights from City University London, which she studied for part-time whilst working.

Blythyn is a Welsh learner, who first started learning Welsh as an adult whilst living in London and has delivered speeches and oral statements in Welsh in the Siambr.

== Professional career ==
Hannah Blythyn’s first job was working in McDonald’s, before working in the charitable sector as a communications and events officer for Student Action for Refugees.

Whilst studying for her Masters, Blythyn worked as a parliamentary assistant for Alyn and Deeside Labour MP Mark Tami.

Blythyn went on to work for Amicus (trade union), then the second largest trade union in the UK before merging with TGWU to form Unite the Union. Blythyn worked as a political officer for Unite at their head office in London before becoming the first political and policy head for Unite Wales. She was active in a number of successful campaigns that led to legislative action and positive change both in Wales and across the UK.

== Political career ==
Hannah Blythyn joined the Labour Party in 2000 and is a former co-chair of UK Young Labour and LGBT Labour. She first represented the UK in 2003 as part of the UK delegation to the European Community Organisation of Socialist Youth (ECOSY), now known as Young European Socialists (YES), where she became the Vice President a couple of years later.

Hannah Blythyn was selected as the Welsh Labour candidate for the Delyn constituency of the Senedd. On 5 May 2016, she was elected a Member of the Senedd; she had received 9,480 of the 23,159 votes cast (40.9%). On 6 May 2021 she retained the seat in the 2021 Senedd election; she received 12,846 votes, 48.1% of the 26,443 votes cast.

When Blythyn first entered the then National Assembly for Wales in 2016, she was one of three openly gay politicians, alongside Plaid Cymru’s Adam Price and Welsh Labour's Jeremy Miles. In December 2016, Blythyn won "Assembly Member to watch" at the ITV Wales Politician of the Year event.

In her first 18 months in the Welsh Assembly, Blythyn, chaired the Cross Party Group for North Wales and the Mersey Dee Alliance and sat on the Economy, Infrastructure and Skills Committee, and the Culture, Welsh Language and Communications Committee.

=== Welsh Labour Leadership Contest 2018 ===
Blythyn backed Mark Drakeford in the 2018 Welsh Labour Leadership election. In April 2018, Blythyn called for a diverse range of candidates to replace Carwyn Jones as First Minister.

=== Democracy in Action Days ===
As the Member of the Senedd for Delyn, Blythyn has set up several "Democracy in Action" days, where students from schools across Flintshire are able to have their say and learn about the democratic process in Wales. Blythyn established the democracy in action days as annual events to ensure young people continue to have their say in how Wales moves forward. This campaign aims to provide young people with a positive and proactive introduction to voting, with Blythyn saying "When I was their age, I didn't think that I had a say or that politics wasn't for somebody like me. So, I think it's important they have an opportunity to learn more about what elected representatives do, but also to ask us questions and to act on their behalf".

=== Pride ===
Blythyn has stated the importance of LGBTQ+ role models for people in Wales. While growing up in north Wales 20 years ago, Blythyn said she had had few people she could identify with.

Blythyn has been an avid supporter of national and local Prides across Wales. In her work on the LGBTQ+ Action Plan for Wales she helped set up the Wales-wide Grassroots Pride Fund.

=== Workers’ Rights ===
Blythyn has claimed that she was influenced by the decimation of traditional industries across North Wales, which has led to campaigns and promoting workers rights at the forefront of her political career. Blythyn has previously described how lesbians in the workplace face a "double glazed glass ceiling".

During the COVID-19 pandemic (UK), Blythyn campaigned for workers and employers to be aware of their rights and responsibilities at work. Part of the campaign was the introduction of the Welsh Government teaming up with their social partners – the Wales TUC, FSB, CBI, Chambers Wales – to launch a campaign to strengthen knowledge and understanding of workplace rights and responsibilities.

Blythyn stated her opposition to the Tories’ Strikes (Minimum Service Levels) Act by condemning the Act as an "unworkable intrusion into devolved matters," and described the legislation as "fundamentally flawed, damaging and counter-productive".

=== Equal Marriage ===
During her time as chair of LGBT Labour Committee, Blythyn was part of the successful campaign to introduce the Equal Marriage Act, allowing LGBT+ people to have the same rights under law to get married in the United Kingdom. Blythyn was at the Houses of Parliament as the legislation passed through the final stage of the parliamentary process.

Blythyn has highlighted the introduction of equal marriage as a triumph of the LGBT+ movement and has encouraged others to remember this success. However, Blythyn has continued to emphasise what work is still left and has campaigned on tackling misinformation and hate speech, highlighting the increase in hate crimes towards LGBTQ+ individuals in 2022.

=== Conversion therapy ban ===
Blythyn has spearheaded the Welsh government plan for a total ban on LGBTQ ‘conversion therapy’: the insidious and scientifically debunked practice of trying to change a person’s sexuality and/or gender identity.

=== Welsh Labour Leadership Contest 2024 ===
Blythyn was tipped to be a potential candidate in the 2024 Welsh Labour Leadership contest, and was considered to likely be the only woman and North Walian on the ballot paper. However, Blythyn ruled herself out of the contest in December 2023, and supported Jeremy Miles. Blythyn paid tribute to Mark Drakeford, when he announced he would step down as First Minister of Wales and leader of Welsh Labour, stating it was a privilege to serve in his government and that he led with integrity and compassion.

== Welsh Government ==
Hannah Blythyn was first appointed to the Welsh Government in 2017 and served in junior ministerial roles under First Ministers Carwyn Jones and Mark Drakeford.

=== Minister for Environment (November 2017 – December 2018) ===
Hannah Blythyn was first appointed to the Welsh Government Cabinet under First Minister Carwyn Jones, on 3 November 2017. Blythyn’s first cabinet position was as the Minister for Environment, where she worked with Julie James MS.

As Minister for Environment, Blythyn launched the consultation which led to the Single Use Plastics Ban (Wales). This consultation set out the Welsh Governments ambition to make Wales free from unnecessary, single use plastics, hard to recycle and commonly littered plastic items, such as straws, cotton buds, polystyrene food and drinks containers could be banned. This formed part of a wider effort to tackle plastic pollution, reduce litter and landfill, and move Wales towards a circular economy.

=== Deputy Minister for Housing and Local Government (December 2018 – May 2021) ===
Blythyn was appointed to Mark Drakeford’s first cabinet in December 2018 as the Deputy Minister for Housing and Local Government. The portfolio worked alongside the Minister for Housing and Local Government, Julie James MS.

As the Deputy Minister for Housing and Local Government, Blythyn announced that Welsh towns would receive £90million of additional investment as part of the Welsh Government approach to transforming town centres across the country. The Transforming Towns package included measures to increase footfall by making sure the public sector locate services in town centre locations, tackle empty buildings and land to help bring them back into use, and greening our town centres.

=== Deputy Minister for Social Partnership (May 2021 – March 2024) ===
Blythyn was appointed to the role of Deputy Minister for Social Partnership in May 2021[iv] after the Welsh Labour victory in the 2021 Welsh Parliament Senedd Cymru elections. The appointment by Mark Drakeford, allowed Blythyn to work with the Minister for Social Justice, Jane Hutt MS, and included the responsibilities of: Co-ordination of cross-cutting measures to promote prosperity and tackle poverty, Digital Inclusion, Fuel Poverty, Fire and Rescue Services including community fire safety, Lead on policy in relation to the Armed Forces in Wales and Veterans, Equality and Human Rights, Co-ordination of issues relating to Gypsies, Roma and Travellers, Asylum-seekers, refugees and community cohesion, Anti-slavery, domestic abuse, gender-based violence and sexual violence, Social Partnership and Public Procurement Bill and Shadow Social Partnership Council, Living Wage, and Fair Work.

The Welsh Government set the commitment of achieving greater LGBTQ+ equality in Wales. The Deputy Minister for Social Partnership, Hannah Blythyn, launched the LGBTQ+ Action Plan consultation, which outlined the Welsh Government’s determination to achieve this historic ambition. Blythyn set out the key commitments to use all available powers to ban all aspects of LGBTQ+ conversion therapy and to support Prides across Wales by sponsoring Pride Cymru, establishing a Wales-wide Pride Fund and appointing a Wales-wide Coordinator.

Blythyn was instrumental in delivering the Social Partnership and Public Procurement (Wales) Act. The Social Partnership and Public Procurement (Wales) Bill provides for a framework to enhance the well-being of the people of Wales by improving public services through social partnership working, promoting fair work and social responsible public procurement.

In early 2024, Blythyn took an unprecedented decision to take decisive action to the fullest extent of the powers available to Welsh Government. This involved the appointment commissioners to oversee South Wales Fire and Rescue Authority to tackle a culture of sexism and misogyny and wider failings in management and leadership at South Wales Fire and Rescue Service. Blythyn featured in BBC Radio 4’s Women’s Hour to discuss the decision.

=== Minister for Social Partnership (March – May 2024) ===
On Thursday 21 March 2024, Blythyn was appointed to Vaughan Gething’s first cabinet as the Minister for Social Partnership. Her role was retitled to Minister by Vaughan Gething upon his appointment as First Minister in March 2024.

==== Firing and Associated Controversy ====
On 16 May 2024, she was dismissed from her position as Minister for Social Partnership by First Minister Vaughan Gething. Gething alleged she was the leak of text messages, in which he discussed deleting messages from a cabinet group chat. Blythyn denied the claims. Blythyn's firing as Social Partnership minister was cited as part of a motion of no confidence in Gething tabled by Conservative MS Darren Millar. Blythyn, alongside Labour colleague Lee Waters were ill on the day of the confidence vote, which the Welsh Government lost 29-27.

Nation.Cymru confirmed on 11 July 2024 that, contrary to Gething's allegations, Blythyn was not the source who shared with them message screenshots for their story on Gething's deletion of messages during his time as Minister for Health and Social Services. On 16 July 2024, evidence was published by the Welsh Government proving that the screenshots were taken from her phone. On 23 January 2025 in an interview with BBC Walescast she refused to say if the screenshot was from her phone because no investigation had taken place.

== Personal life ==
Hannah Blythyn became one of the first three openly gay and lesbian Members of the Welsh Assembly upon her election in 2016. She featured in the 2017, 2022, and 2023 Pinc List of leading Welsh LGBT figures.

Blythyn lives in Mold, in her North Wales constituency of Delyn with her wife, Laura, and their dog Scout.

Her maternal grandfather worked at the steelworks in Shotton, whilst her paternal grandfather was employed at the Point of Ayr Colliery.

Outside of politics, Blythyn enjoys spending time outdoors and now labels herself as a lapsed cyclist, having previously taken part in a charity bike ride across Kenya.

== Notes ==
Senedd
Preceded by Sandy Mewies	Member of the Senedd for Delyn; 2016 – 2026	Succeeded by Constituency abolished
