= County Hall, Mold =

Former municipal building in Mold, Wales

County Hall
- Neuadd yr Sir (Welsh)
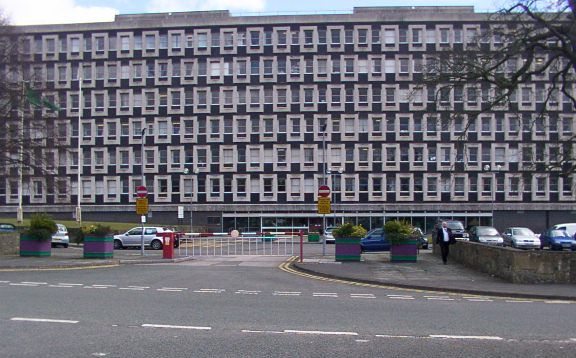
- County Hall

- Location within Flintshire
- Former names: Shire Hall

General information
- Architectural style: Brutalist style
- Location: Mold, Flintshire, United Kingdom
- Coordinates: 53.1763°N 3.1364°W
- Completed: 1967
- Client: Flintshire County Council (1996-2025)

Design and construction
- Architect: Robert Harvey

County Hall (Welsh: Neuadd y Sir) is a former municipal building on Raikes Lane in Mold, Flintshire. It was the headquarters of the historic Flintshire county council from 1967 to 1974, the headquarters of Clwyd County Council from 1974 to 1996 and the headquarters of the modern Flintshire County Council from 1996 to 2025.

== History ==
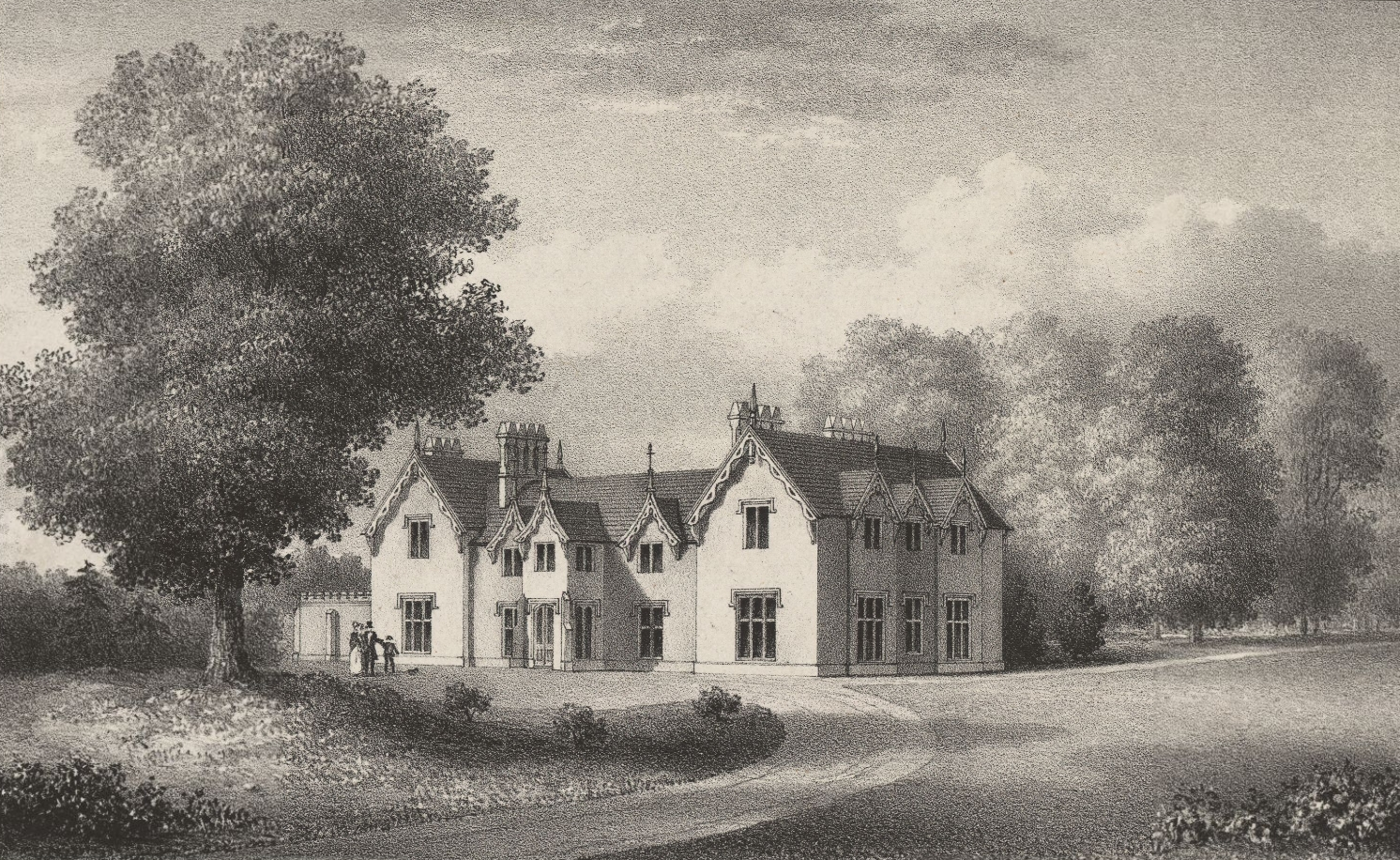
A 19th century print showing Llwynegrin Hall which has been retained as the local Register Office

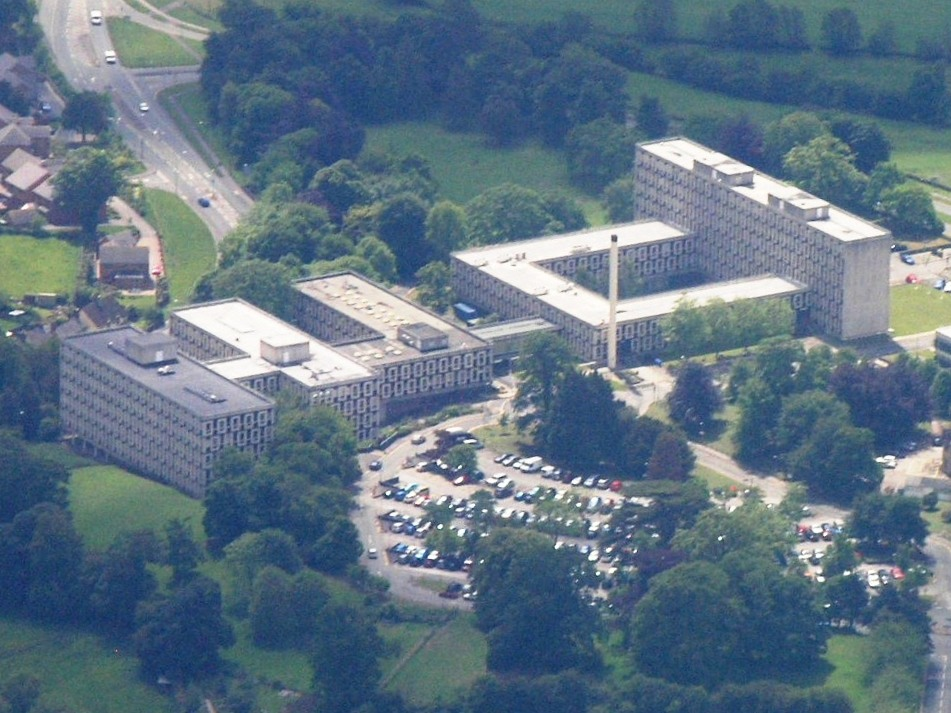
Aerial view of County Hall

Following the implementation of the Local Government Act 1888, which established county councils in every county, Flintshire County Council set up its base at the old County Hall in Chester Street in Mold. Additional facilities acquired included a local militia barracks (originally designed by Thomas Mainwaring Penson) which was converted for use as council offices in the late 1880s. After finding, in the 1930s, that the Chester Street facilities were too cramped, county leaders decided to procure modern facilities: the site they selected formed part of the Llwynegrin Hall estate which was acquired for the purpose. (Note: Llwynegrin Hall, which was designed by Thomas Jones of Chester in the Tudor style for Philip Davies Cooke of Gwysaney, was completed in 1830. It was acquired by Flintshire County Council in 1948 and became the local register office in April 2005.)

The new building, which was designed by the county architect, Robert Harvey, in the brutalist style and influenced by the work of Frank Lloyd Wright, was completed in October 1967. The design for the seven-storey building, which involved a series a parallel wings, featured continuous rows of windows, every second of which had a heavy concrete surround: it was officially opened as the Shire Hall by Princess Margaret, Countess of Snowdon in May 1968. An extension to the building was opened by Princess Anne in July 1972. After the implementation of the Local Government Act 1972, the new building became the home of Clwyd County Council in 1974.

On 1 April 1996, under the Local Government (Wales) Act 1994, Clwyd County Council was broken up and the building was acquired by the new Flintshire County Council who subsequently renamed it County Hall. The new Flintshire County Council also inherited the former Alyn and Deeside Borough Council Civic Offices, which had been built in 1992 at St David's Park in Ewloe in the community of Hawarden. The building at Ewloe was leased to Unilever for some years and was renamed "Unity House". By 2018, County Hall was proving very costly to maintain, while Unilever's lease of Unity House had ended and the council had tried to sell it without success. The council therefore decided to move several departments to Unity House, which it renamed Tŷ Dewi Sant (Welsh for 'St David's House'). The rear wings of County Hall were then demolished in 2020, retaining only the front part of the building which includes the council chamber and some office space. County Hall therefore continues to serve as the council's official headquarters and meeting place, but many of the council's staff are now based at Tŷ Dewi Sant. In March 2025, the council had fully vacated the building, completing their move to Tŷ Dewi Sant in Ewloe.
