= District of Alyn and Deeside =

Former district of Clwyd, Wales

Coordinates: 53.17°N 3.08°W

Alyn and Deeside Welsh: Alun a Glannau Dyfrdwy
- District
- History
  - Created: 1 April 1974
  - Abolished: 31 March 1996
  - Succeeded by: Flintshire
  - HQ: Hawarden
- Contained within
  - County Council: Clwyd

Alyn and Deeside (Welsh: Alun a Glannau Dyfrdwy) was one of six local government districts in the county of Clwyd, north-east Wales from 1974 to 1996. There is still a parliamentary constituency of the same name.

== History ==
The district was created on 1 April 1974 under the Local Government Act 1972. It covered three former districts from the administrative county of Flintshire, which were all abolished at the same time:

- Buckley Urban District
- Connah's Quay Urban District
- Hawarden Rural District, except the parish of Marford and Hoseley (an exclave, surrounded by Denbighshire) which went to Wrexham Maelor.

The government initially specified that the new district should be called Alyn-Dee, reflecting the district's location between the River Alyn and River Dee. The neighbouring district was similarly called Delyn, combining the names of the same two rivers the other way around. The shadow council elected in 1973 requested that the name be changed from Alyn-Dee to Alyn and Deeside. The change of name was confirmed by the Secretary of State for Wales on 19 October 1973, before the new district formally came into being.

The district was abolished under the Local Government (Wales) Act 1994, which saw Clwyd County Council and its constituent districts abolished, being replaced by principal areas, whose councils perform the functions which had previously been divided between the county and district councils. The former area of Alyn and Deeside all became part of the new Flintshire principal area on 1 April 1996.

== Political control ==
The first election to the council was held in 1973, initially operating as a shadow authority alongside the outgoing authorities until it came into its powers on 1 April 1974. From 1974 until the council's abolition in 1996, political control was as follows:

Party in control	Years
Labour	1974–1976
No overall control	1976–1987
Labour	1987–1996

== Premises ==
The council inherited three main offices from its predecessor authorities, and for most of the council's existence its functions were divided between them:

- Council Chambers, Mold Road, Buckley, built in 1901, from Buckley Urban District Council
- Civic Centre, Wepre Drive, Connah's Quay, built early 1960s, from Connah's Quay Urban District Council
- Council Offices, Glynne Way, Hawarden, built in 1886, from Hawarden Rural District Council

In 1992 the council consolidated all its offices at a new building which it called the Civic Offices at St David's Park in Ewloe in the community of Hawarden. After the council's abolition ownership of the Civic Offices passed to the new Flintshire County Council, which leased the building to Unilever who renamed it "Unity House". In 2018, after Unilever's lease expired, Flintshire County Council brought the building back into civic use, renaming it "Ty Dewi Sant" and moving various departments there from County Hall, Mold.
