= Loveday =

Loveday is a name, thought to derive from Old English Leofdaeg or alternatively Lief Tag. Leofdaeg is composed of the words leof meaning dear/beloved or precious and daeg meaning day. Lief Tag literally translates to Love Day, and is thought to have existed in eastern Britain from around the 7th century.

Loveday was used as a given name during the Middle Ages in England, which has now become confined to Cornwall, where it survives in occasional use by people such as Loveday Jenkin. The name was originally bestowed, either formally or as a nickname, with reference to a Love Day, a day appointed for a meeting between enemies and litigants with a view to an amicable settlement.

Variant spellings include:

- Daylof
- Dayluue
- Leuare
- Leudedai
- Leue
- Leued
- Leuedaei
- Liuedai
- Loue
- Louedai
- Loueday
- Lovdie
- Love
- Lovedaia
- Loveday
- Lovedaya
- Loveta
- Lovota
- Lowdy
- Lowdie
- Luueday
- Luuedei
- Luveday
- Leofdaeg
- Lief Tag

== First name ==
- Loveday Carlyon, Cornish politician
- Loveday Enyinnaya, Nigerian football player
- Loveday Jenkin, Cornish politician

Fictional characters

- Loveday Brooke, in books by Catherine Louisa Pirkis
- Loveday Carne, the daughter of Drake and Morwenna in the Poldark books by Winston Graham
- Loveday Carey-Lewis, in the novel Coming Home by Rosamunde Pilcher
- Loveday De Noir, one of the main characters of the film The Secret of Moonacre
- Loveday Leigh, in the novel The Case Is Closed by Patricia Wentworth
- Loveday Heptane, in the Locked Tomb series by Tamsyn Muir
- Loveday Finch, in the novel Sawbones by Catherine Johnson

== Surname ==
- Alan Loveday (1928–2016), New Zealand-born violinist
- Alexander Loveday, British economist
- Catherine Loveday, British campaigner for war memorials
- Clare Loveday, South African classical music composer
- David Loveday, English Anglican bishop
- Francis Loveday (1892–1954), English cricketer
- Gary Loveday (born 1964), English cricketer
- Helen Loveday, Swiss university lecturer
- Henry Herbert Loveday, British railway administrator
- John Loveday (disambiguation), several people
- Leigh Loveday, Welsh video game writer and designer
- Mark Loveday, British businessman
- Papis Loveday, Senegalese model and fashion entrepreneur
- Pete Loveday, British cartoonist
- Peter Loveday (singer-songwriter), Australian singer/songwriter
- Richard John Loveday (1818–1883), South Australian surveyor
- Ron Loveday (1900–1987), Australian politician
- Thomas Loveday, 16th-century MP for Gloucester
- Thomas Loveday (university administrator), British professor of philosophy, later a university administrator

Fictional Characters

- Robert "Bob" Loveday, in the novel The Trumpet-Major by Thomas Hardy
- Zack Loveday, fictional character from the soap opera Hollyoaks
- Mr Loveday, in Mr Loveday’s Little Outing by Evelyn Waugh. Adapted for television in 2006.
