= John Jones of Gellilyfdy =

Welsh antiquarian, calligrapher and collector

John Jones of Gellilyfdy (c. 1578 - c. 1658) was a Welsh lawyer, antiquary, calligrapher, manuscript collector and scribe. He is particularly significant for his copying of many historic Welsh language manuscripts which would otherwise have been lost.

Jones often styled himself as Siôn ap Wiliam ap Siôn, using the Welsh patronymic system, in his manuscripts.

== Life ==
Like many antiquaries of the period, Jones came from a family of the minor rural gentry; he was the eldest of six sons of William Jones, whose lands were at Gellilyfdy, Ysgeifiog, Flintshire (Gellilyfdy farm still stands near the small village of Babell). He was educated in law, probably at Shrewsbury School (lodging in the present-day Plough Inn on Cornmarket), and by 1609 was engaged in the Court of the Marches at Ludlow as an attorney. By this time he had already begun to make copies of manuscripts that he located in the houses of the Welsh gentry: however, by 1611 he was in a debtor's prison in London. Jones was to spend much of his life in prison from this point, although he used his time while incarcerated to carry out much of his transcription work and did relatively little copying while at liberty.

In 1612 Jones was at Cardiff transcribing the Book of Llandaff, but by 1617 was in the Fleet Prison: he was also imprisoned at Chester and Ludlow at various times. Although he inherited the residue of his father's estate in 1622, this was to lead to a series of lawsuits in Chancery, and the remainder of his life was blighted by legal actions (either as defendant or plaintiff), debt and periodic imprisonment. During the Civil War period Jones was also imprisoned for refusing to pay taxes, complained about the privations visited on Wales by the King and Parliament, and spent a great deal of time petitioning various political figures such as Endymion Porter. Perhaps unsurprisingly given his experiences, Jones was eventually to disown the legal profession, writing from prison on such subjects as "The Judgments of good Kings on unjust Judges". Jones was recorded as being at Gellilyfdy in 1654, but was back in the Fleet by November.

Jones was a friend of the antiquary Robert Vaughan, and the latter seems to have come into the possession of Jones' manuscript collection (including the White Book of Rhydderch) on his death, although he may also have accepted at least some in payment of a debt. Edward Lhuyd, in his Archaeologia Britannica, and others relate a story that Jones and Vaughan, who were regular correspondents, had made an arrangement that the survivor of the two would inherit the other's library.

Jones' exact date of death is not known, but he was possibly still alive in 1658 and probably died in the Fleet early that year. Jones had married in 1651, and letters of administration after his death show he had three female children. His widow Elizabeth was still alive in 1662, when she was assessed for the hearth tax at Gellilyfdy.

== Manuscripts ==
Both Jones' father and grandfather (the latter of whom had been the subject of elegies written by sixteenth-century poets Wiliam Llŷn and William Cynwal) had been manuscript collectors. His first manuscript copy was made in 1598, and he went on to make over a hundred further volumes. Later characterised as a rather indiscriminate copyist, Jones transcribed works on a vast range of subjects: in addition to his interests in law, poetry and history, he may in part have worked simply to relieve the stresses of imprisonment, as he would obsessively recopy or re-arrange existing works when no new materials were available.

Jones was not only a copyist but was also a notable calligrapher, designing many of his own capitals and tail-pieces and adopting others from Italian models. Due to the high sulphur content of the ink he used, some of his most attractive work can no longer be reproduced, as the ink has consumed the paper it was written on.

Jones also started to compile a Welsh or Welsh-Latin dictionary in 1623. This became a characteristically massive undertaking; William Owen Pughe, compiler of an important early 19th century Welsh-English dictionary, regarded Jones' Welsh vocabulary as "the most valuable" up to that point "due to its copiousness".
