= John Loveday =

John Loveday may refer to:

- John Loveday, the eponymous trumpet major of Thomas Hardy's 1880 novel The Trumpet-Major
- John Loveday (antiquary) (1711–1789), English antiquarian
- John Loveday (rugby union) (1949–2023), New Zealand rugby union player
- John Loveday (physicist), experimental physicist
