= Peter Loveday (singer-songwriter) =

Australian singer-songwriter

- Born: Toowoomba, Australia
- Genres: Chamber pop, post punk, alternative
- Occupation: Singer-songwriter
- Instruments: Guitar, vocals
- Years active: 1978–present
- Website: www.peterloveday.com

Peter Loveday is an Australian singer-songwriter.

== Biography ==
Peter Loveday was born and grew up in Toowoomba, Australia, before moving on to study at the University of Queensland in Brisbane in the late seventies, where he began his musical career.

== Music ==
In 1978 Loveday began playing in bands in Brisbane, including the Supports, the Sea Benz, Birds of Tin, Mute 44, and Antic Frantic. Late in 1978 the Supports organised a tour of north Queensland in a Double-decker bus, joined at the last minute by the Go-Betweens. "Loveday's music developed into a crucial part of the Brisbane Sound—an almost sub-genre of Post-punk music, a sound synonymous with the likes of The Apartments, Out of Nowhere and the Go-Betweens. At that time, in inner-city Brisbane, as in many cities in Australia and around the world, the direct influence of the punk and new wave music scene of New York and London was resonating strongly. Loveday's first recordings were produced and sold on Cassette tapes, and first songs appeared in the cassette magazine Fast Forward. In the early 80s Loveday moved to London with the Brisbane-born, London-based band Tiny Town with long time collaborators Lee Bradshaw and Geoff Titley. Titley was already based in London where he had been a member of the pioneering do-it-yourself ethic band, the Desperate Bicycles. Loveday performed and recorded in London for the next seven years, coinciding with other Australian bands in London at the time, like the Birthday Party, the Moodists, and the Go-Betweens.

The first Tiny Town recording "Back to the Bow" was distributed as a Flexi disc in the Sydney fanzine, Distant Violins. Tiny Town played regularly at the old time music hall theatre, the Pindar of Wakefield, subsequently called the Water Rats, alongside bands like the Pogues, and fellow Australians in London at the time the Moodists and the Go-Betweens. At one such gig, music journalist Chris Heath wrote "Tiny Town had reason to be nervous. Not only had they to follow a casually brilliant performance by fellow Australians-in-London the Go-Betweens, but to do so in front of an audience barely numbering 25, two of whom were those young men-about-town, English BBC DJ, John Peel and his producer, John Walters." The Pindar of Wakefield was where Bob Dylan played his first UK gig in December 1962.

The majority of Loveday's recorded work has been independently released. Loveday often designs and produces cover art, flyers and posters, using a paper cut stencil and collage technique. A screen print of Loveday's is included in The National Gallery of Australia Centre for Australian Art, posters from the late 70s also featured in the multi-media exhibition The Brisbane Sound at the Institute of Modern Art in Brisbane, Australia, and a collection of Loveday's posters produced between 1978 and 1985 is held in the State Library of Queensland.

In the late 1980s, Loveday moved to Barcelona, where he currently lives and often collaborates with Sarah Davison (flute, percussion and vocals) and Naomi Wedman (violin, keyboard and vocals). He also collaborates with David McClymont, a founding member of Scottish band Orange Juice (band).

== Writing ==
Stories from Loveday's collection "Rock Dreams" appeared in the magazine PEN International Volume 59, No.2. The stories were published in Spanish. He has also been published in the literary magazine Barcelona Ink and contributed a piece "C’est le son d'aujourd'hui" to the limited edition box set of The Go-Betweens Anthology, Volume 1.

== Discography ==
- Birds of Tin "Same Both Sides" – cassette (1981) Reissued 7" vinyl (LCMR 2018)
- Antic Frantic "Pomes Penyeach" – cassette (1982)

Tiny Town

- Back to the Bow/Big Fish – 7˝ flexi-disc (Elastic 1982)
- Drop by Drop/Know Better – 7˝ single (Elastic 1984)
- Living out of Living/Queue Up – 7˝ single (Elastic 1984)
- Little Tin God – 12˝ LP (Elastic 1984)
- No Place Like Rome – 12˝ EP (Very Mouth 1985)

Solo albums

- A Bend in the Road (2002)
- Sea-shanties for Landlubbers (2004)
- Moving Along (2006)
- Room at the Inn (2007)
- Standard Ideal (2009)
- Roadside Ballads (2013)
- Through the Mirror (2019)
- The Faraway Near (2021)
- For Everything a Place (2024)

Collaborations with David McClymont (ex-Orange Juice)

- Borrowed Landscapes (2017)
- A New Path to the Waterfall (2020)
- The Man Who Loved Flowers (2026)
