= 2017 Flintshire County Council election =

Welsh local election

Results of the 2017 Flintshire County Council election

2017 Elections to Flintshire County Council took place on 4 May 2017. The council remained under no overall control.

== Results ==
Results
Party	Seats
Labour	34
Independent	23
Conservative	6
Liberal Democrat	5
Other	2

== By-elections ==
=== Penyffordd ===
Penyffordd: 7 October 2021
Party	Candidate	Votes	%	±%
Labour	Alasdair Ibbotson	437	37.4	N/A
Independent	Steve Saxon	286	24.5	N/A
Independent	Pay Ransome	283	24.2	N/A
Independent	Roy Wakeham	163	13.9	N/A
Majority		151	12.9	N/A
Turnout		1,169		
Labour gain from Independent		Swing	N/A	
