= Flintshire People's Voice =

Political party in Flintshire, North East Wales

- Leader: Sam Swash
- Treasurer: Alasdair Ibbotson
- Founded: 2024
- Headquarters: Castle Bank, Stamford Way, Ewloe, Deeside, Flintshire CH5 3BZ
- Ideology: Localism; Populism
- Colours: Green Teal
- Flintshire County Council: 7 / 67

Website
- www.fpv.wales

Flintshire People's Voice is a local political party in Flintshire, Wales formed in 2024. It currently has 7 elected councillors on Flintshire County Council.

The party was formed in April 2024 when 5 sitting Labour councillors crossed the floor and defected from the ruling Labour administration after accusing a cabinet member of 'misleading backbenchers'. They further cited policy disagreements and a culture within the ruling group of ignoring the concerns of backbench councillors.

The party's logo includes a chough, the heraldic symbol of the county of Flintshire, which features on the county's coat of arms and flag. The party's registration was approved by the Electoral Commission on 3 February 2025.

== Representation ==
Name	Ward
Alasdair Ibbotson	Penyffordd
Carolyn Preece	Buckley: Bistre West
Chrissy Gee	Broughton South
Dan Rose	Buckley: Bistre West
Gillian Brockley	Hawarden: Aston
Josh Swash	Higher Kinnerton
Sam Swash	Hawarden: Mancot

== Election results ==
=== Council by-elections ===
Election	Votes	Candidate	%	Finish
2026 Leeswood by-election	79	Allison Davies	11.0%	5th
2026 Higher Kinnerton by-election	566	Josh Swash	91.3%	1st
