= Ewloe =

Village in Flintshire, Wales

Coordinates: 53.189°N 3.044°W

Ewloe: Welsh: Ewlo or Ewloe
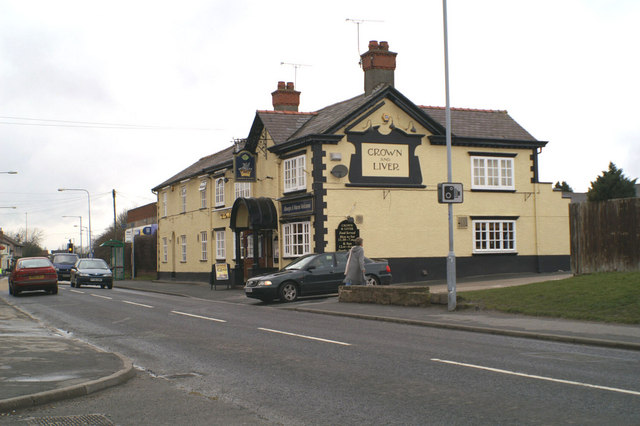
- The Crown and Liver public house, Ewloe

- Location within Flintshire
- Population: 5,420 (2011 CensusWard)
- OS grid reference: SJ303663
- Community: Hawarden
- Principal area: Flintshire
- Preserved county: Clwyd
- Country: Wales
- Sovereign state: United Kingdom
- Post town: DEESIDE
- Postcode district: CH5
- Dialling code: 01244
- Police: North Wales
- Fire: North Wales
- Ambulance: Welsh
- UK Parliament: Alyn and Deeside
- Senedd Cymru – Welsh Parliament: Alyn and Deeside, North Wales

Ewloe (/ˈjuːloʊ/; alternative Welsh: Ewlo, [ˈɛʊlɔ]) is a village and electoral ward in the community of Hawarden in Flintshire, Wales. It is close to the county's border with Cheshire, England. The Ewloe electoral ward had a population of 5,420 at the 2011 Census.

A notable landmark is Ewloe Castle, which dates to the thirteenth century and is in the ward of Aston. The A55 expressway passes through the village. Flintshire County Council has its headquarters in Ewloe, at St David's Park.

== Economy ==
Ewloe grew rapidly during the late 1990s and early 2000s and is now the home of the internet based Moneysupermarket.com and construction company Redrow. Flintshire County Council has one of its main offices at Ty Dewi Sant on St David's Park, a building which had previously been occupied by Unilever and before them by the former Alyn and Deeside District Council.

The Village Hotels chain of hotels hosts the 'St David's Hotel' just off the A55 road network in Ewloe. The St David's Park housing estate was built in the 1990s and is known as being a prestigious estate popular with young professionals and families respectively. Increasing numbers of new property and the resulted increase to population in Ewloe led to the opening of a new Co-op supermarket on the St David's Park road, with Ewloe now boasting two Co-op stores around 835 metres apart.

A chain super pub was built in St Davids Park, which then opened in September 2010, but was damaged in an arson attack early morning on 6 February 2011. It has since reopened.

== Education ==
Ewloe Green Primary School and Hawarden High School are located within Ewloe. Penarlag County Primary School is considered by many to be based in Ewloe but is actually in the adjacent area of Aston.

== Governance ==
At the lowest level of local government, Ewloe is an electoral ward that elects community councillors to Hawarden Community Council. The other two community electoral divisions are Aston and Mancot.

Flintshire County Council has been fully based at Tŷ Dewi Sant in St Davids Park in Ewloe since March 2025, following the completion of the council's move from County Hall in Mold.

Ewloe is also a county ward for elections to Flintshire County Council, electing two county councillors.

The urban area of the village is contiguous with Hawarden, Buckley and Shotton. The Office for National Statistics deems Ewloe to form part of the Buckley built-up area, which covers much of Deeside.

== Notable residents ==
- In 2004 professional footballer Michael Owen bought a small street of houses, Austen Close in Ewloe, for his extended family. He had grown up and owned a house nearby.
- Idwal Davies (1899–1980), a Wales and Bolton Wanderers footballer, was born in nearby Ewloe Green.
