= Idwal Davies (footballer) =

Welsh footballer

Personal information
- Full name: Robert Idwal Davies
- Date of birth: 17 August 1899
- Place of birth: Ewloe Green, Wales
- Date of death: 7 June 1980 (aged 80)
- Place of death: South Africa
- Position: Centre forward

Senior career*
| Years | Team | Apps | (Gls) |
| 1918 | Conway | | |
| 1919–1920 | Buckley United | | |
| 1920–1921 | Southport | 9 | (4) |
| 1921–1923 | Marine | | |
| 1923 | Rhyl | | |
| 1923–1924 | Liverpool | 0 | (0) |
| 1924–1925 | Bolton Wanderers | 3 | (0) |
| 1925–1927 | Rhyl | | |
- Welsh Dragons

International career
| 1923 | Wales | 1 | (0) |
- * Club domestic league appearances and goals

Robert Idwal Davies (17 August 1899 – 7 June 1980) was a Welsh amateur footballer who played as a centre-forward for various clubs in the 1920s including brief spells with Southport and Bolton Wanderers in the Football League. He also made six appearances in amateur internationals for Wales and one full international appearance against Scotland in 1923.

== Football career ==
Davies was born in Ewloe Green, Flintshire, the son of a Presbyterian minister and educated at Abergele County School. During the First World War, he enlisted in the London Scottish Battalion and was later in the Gordon Highlanders, playing football for both regiments.

After he was demobbed, he joined Conway of the North Wales Coast League before returning to his place of birth with Buckley United, who were playing in the West Cheshire League. His performances with Buckley brought him to the attention of larger clubs, including West Bromwich Albion in 1919. Although Albion were keen to sign him, Davies was reluctant to travel to the West Midlands on a regular basis. At this time he was working in a bank, who transferred him to a branch in Southport where he joined the local club, who were then playing in the Football League Third Division North, in December 1920. He made nine appearances for Southport, scoring four goals, in the 1921–22 season.

He then joined Crosby club Marine, where he remained for two years. He had made his first international appearance for Wales as an amateur (against England) in 1921; in his next appearance at this level, in January 1923, he scored three goals against England. Described as "a clever forward", he led the line "with spirit and tact" and was "equally adept at the short passing game or swinging the ball out to the wings". His performance earned him a call-up to the full Wales team to play Scotland in March 1923. This match clashed with a full Football League programme and as a result most of the players who had earned a draw against England two weeks earlier were unavailable; the "patched-up" team were no match for the full-strength Scots who ran out 2–0 victors, with both goals coming from Andrew Wilson.

In the summer of 1923 he briefly joined Rhyl before moving to Liverpool in August. He made no appearances for the Liverpool first team and in December 1924 he signed as an amateur for Bolton Wanderers where he made three appearances in the Football League First Division. He then returned to Rhyl for two years, before finishing his playing career at the "Welsh Dragons".

He played for the Welsh amateurs in each of the matches against England in 1924, 1925 and 1926 as well as against South Africa in 1925.

== Later career ==
By 1930, his playing career was over and he concentrated on his employment as a representative with Hartley's Jams in the north-west, before becoming south of England area manager. He later emigrated to South Africa, where he died in June 1980.
