= Flintshire County Council =

Local government of Flintshire, Wales

Flintshire County Council Cyngor Sir y Fflint (Welsh)

Type
- Type: Principal council of Flintshire

Leadership
- Chair: Mel Buckley, Labour since 20 May 2025
- Leader: Dave Hughes, Labour since 24 September 2024
- Chief Executive: Neal Cockerton since 2021

Structure
- Seats: 67 councillors
- Graph of the party split among 67 seats.
- Political groups: Administration (40) Labour (27) Independent (13) Other parties (27) Reform (8) FPV (7) Liberal Democrats (4) Conservative (1) Independent (7)
- Length of term: 5 years

Elections
- Voting system: First-past-the-post
- Last election: 5 May 2022
- Next election: 6 May 2027

Meeting place
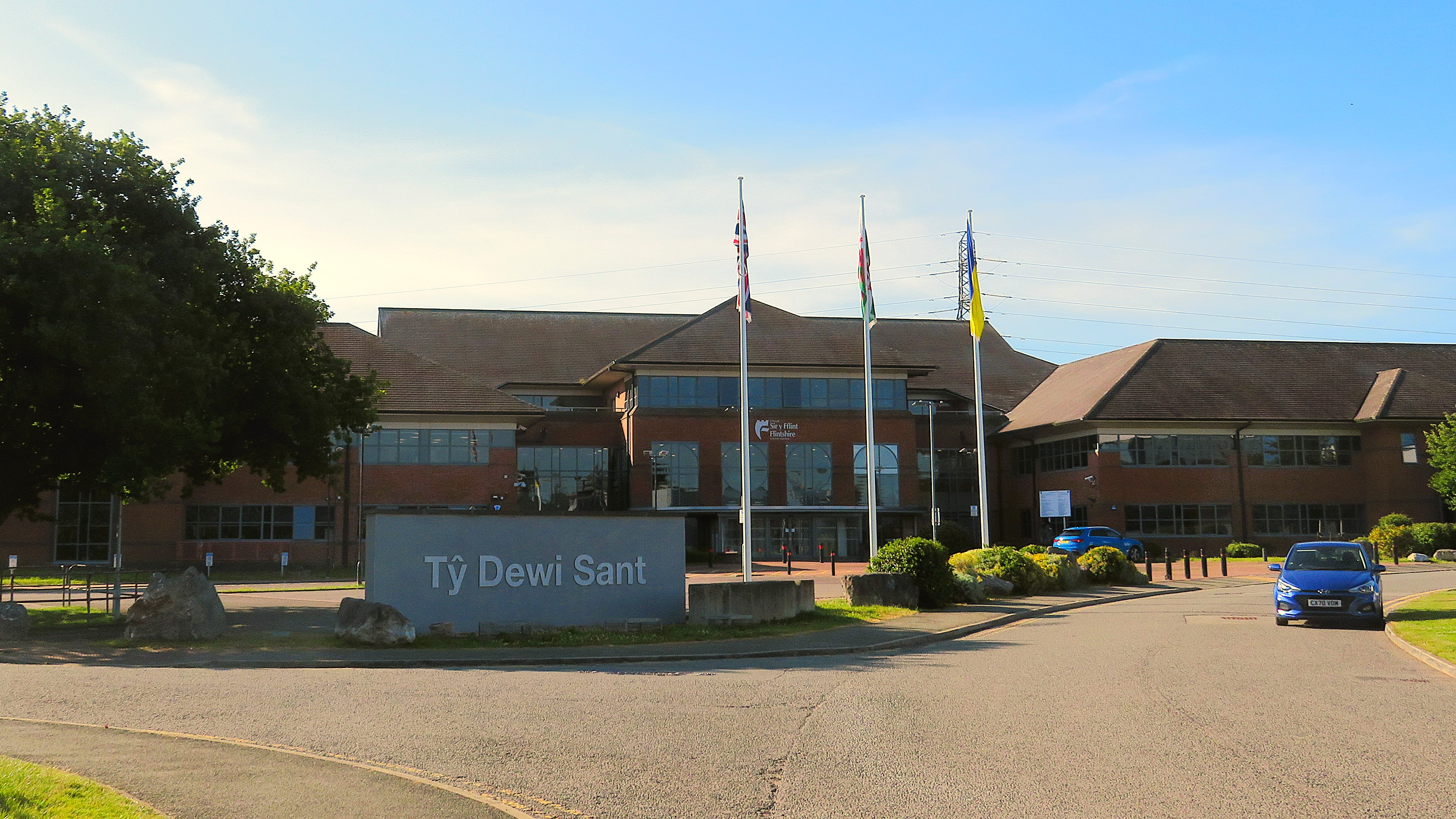
- Tŷ Dewi Sant, St. Davids Park, Ewloe, Deeside, CH5 3FF

Website
- www.flintshire.gov.uk

Flintshire County Council (Welsh: Cyngor Sir y Fflint) is the local authority for the county of Flintshire, one of the principal areas of Wales. It is based at Tŷ Dewi Sant in Ewloe. Elections take place every five years. The last election was on 5 May 2022. The council has been under no overall control since 2008. Since October 2024 the council has been run by a coalition of Labour and some of the independent councillors.

== History ==
Flintshire County Council was first created in 1889 under the Local Government Act 1888, which established elected county councils to take over the administrative functions of the quarter sessions. That county council and the administrative county of Flintshire were abolished in 1974, when the area merged with neighbouring Denbighshire to become the new county of Clwyd. Flintshire was unusual in retaining exclaves right up until the 1974 reforms. The contiguous part of the county was split to become three of the six districts of Clwyd: Alyn and Deeside, Delyn, and Rhuddlan. The county's exclaves of Maelor Rural District and the parish of Marford and Hoseley both went to the Wrexham Maelor district.

Under the Local Government (Wales) Act 1994, Clwyd County Council and the county's constituent districts were abolished, being replaced by principal areas, whose councils perform the functions which had previously been divided between the county and district councils. The two districts of Alyn and Deeside and Delyn were merged to become a new county of Flintshire, which came into effect on 1 April 1996. The Flintshire County Council created in 1996 therefore covers a smaller area than the pre-1974 county, omitting the Rhuddlan district, which went to the new Denbighshire county, and omitting the pre-1974 exclaves, which form part of Wrexham County Borough.

== Political control ==
The council has been under no overall control since 2008. Following the 2022 election Labour formed a minority administration with informal support from the Liberal Democrats. A new coalition administration subsequently formed in October 2024, comprising Labour and the Independent and Eagle groupings of independent councillors, led by Labour councillor Dave Hughes.

The first election to the new council was held in 1995. It initially operated as a shadow authority alongside the outgoing authorities before coming into its powers on 1 April 1996. Political control of the council since 1996 has been as follows:

Party in control	Years
Labour	1996–2008
No overall control	2008–present

=== Leadership ===
The leaders of the council since 1996 have been:

Councillor	Party	From	To
Tom Middlehurst	Labour	1 Apr 1996	May 1999
Alex Aldridge	Labour	18 May 1999	10 Jan 2006
Derek Darlington	Labour	10 Jan 2006	27 Nov 2006
Aaron Shotton	Labour	19 Dec 2006	May 2008
Arnold Woolley	Independent	13 May 2008	May 2012
Aaron Shotton	Labour	15 May 2012	9 Apr 2019
Ian Roberts	Labour	9 Apr 2019	30 Jul 2024
Dave Hughes	Labour	24 Sep 2024	

=== Composition ===
Following the 2022 election and subsequent by-elections and changes of allegiance up to October 2026, the composition of the council was:

Party	Seats
Labour	27
Reform	8
Flintshire People's Voice	6
Liberal Democrats	4
Conservative	1
Independent	21
Total	67

Of the independent councillors, ten form the "Independent Group", six form the "True Independent" group, three form the "Eagle" group, and the other two are not aligned to any group. Cabinet positions are shared between Labour, the Independent Group, and Eagle, which therefore form the council's administration. In April 2024 several sitting councillors left Labour to form Flintshire People's Voice.

The next election is due in 2027.

== Elections ==
Since 2012, elections have taken place every five years. The last election was 5 May 2022.

Year	Seats	Labour	Independent	Liberal Democrats	Conservative	Plaid Cymru	Green	Notes
1995	72	**46**	17	5	3	1	0	Labour majority controlled
1999	70	**42**	17	7	1	2	1	Labour majority control. New ward boundaries.
2004	70	**37**	18	10	4	1	0	Labour majority control
2008	70	22	**27**	11	9	1	0	
2012	70	**30**	24	7	8	1	0	
2017	70	**34**	25	5	6	0	0	Fourteen (13 Lab & 1 Ind) of the seventy seats were elected unopposed.
2022	67	**31**	30	4	2	0	0	New ward boundaries.

Party with the most elected councillors in bold.

== Premises ==
The council is based at Tŷ Dewi Sant (St David's House) in Ewloe, which forms part of the community of Hawarden and comes under the post town of Deeside.

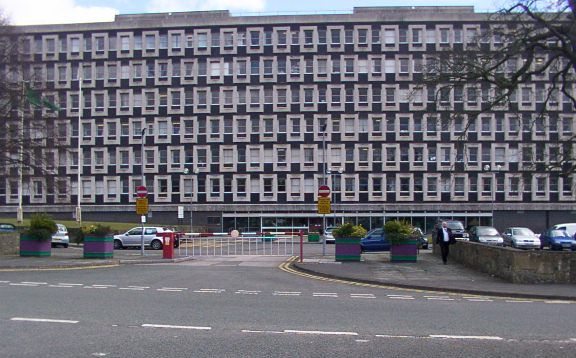
County Hall, Mold: Council's headquarters until 2025

The modern council was previously based at County Hall on Raikes Lane in Mold, which was built in 1967 for the original Flintshire County Council. Between 1974 and 1996, County Hall had been the headquarters of Clwyd County Council. When Flintshire was re-established as an administrative area in 1996, the new council inherited County Hall and the relatively new offices (built 1992) of Alyn and Deeside Borough Council at St David's Park in Ewloe. The building at Ewloe was leased to Unilever for some years and was renamed "Unity House". By 2018, County Hall was proving very costly to maintain, while Unilever's lease of Unity House had ended and the council had tried to sell it without success. The council therefore decided to move several departments to Unity House, which it renamed Tŷ Dewi Sant. The rear wings of County Hall were then demolished in 2020, retaining only the front part of the building which included the council chamber and some office space. A new council chamber was subsequently created at Tŷ Dewi Sant in 2025, allowing that building to also become the council's meeting place. The council then fully vacated County Hall in March 2025.

The council also has an area office at Chapel Street in Flint called County Offices (formerly Delyn House) which it inherited from Delyn Borough Council.

== Electoral divisions ==
Electoral divisions of Flintshire

Since the 2022 elections, the county has been divided into 45 wards, returning 67 councillors.

Few communities in Flintshire are coterminous with electoral wards. The following table lists the wards as existed prior to 2022 along with the communities and associated geographical areas. Communities with a community council are indicated by *:

Ward	Communities	Other geographic areas
Argoed	Argoed* (East and South wards)	
Aston	Hawarden* (Aston ward)	
Bagillt East	Bagillt* (East and Merllyn wards)	
Bagillt West	Bagillt* (Central and West wards)	
Broughton North East	Broughton and Bretton* (East and North wards)	
Broughton South	Broughton and Bretton* (South ward)	
Brynford	Brynford*; Halkyn* (Pentre Halkyn ward)	
Buckley Bistre East	Buckley (town)* (Bistre East ward)	
Buckley Bistre West	Buckley (town)* (Bistre West ward)	
Buckley Mountain	Buckley (town)* (Mountain ward)	
Buckley Pentrobin	Buckley (town)* (Pentrobin ward)	
Caergwrle	Hope* (Caergwrle ward)	
Caerwys	Caerwys (town)*; Ysceifiog*	
Cilcain	Cilcain*; Nannerch*	
Connah's Quay Central	Connah's Quay (town)* (Central ward)	
Connah's Quay Golftyn	Connah's Quay (town)* (Golftyn ward)	
Connah's Quay South	Connah's Quay (town)* (South ward)	
Connah's Quay Wepre	Connah's Quay (town)* (Wepre ward)	
Ewloe	Hawarden* (Ewloe ward)	
Ffynnongroyw	Llanasa* (Ffynnongroyw ward)	
Flint Castle	Flint (town)* (Castle ward)	
Flint Coleshill	Flint (town)* (Coleshill ward)	
Flint Oakenholt	Flint (town)* (Oakenholt ward)	
Flint Trelawny	Flint (town)* (Trelawny ward)	
Greenfield	Holywell (town)* (Greenfield ward)	
Gronant	Llanasa* (Gronant ward)	
Gwernaffield	Gwernaffield*	
Gwernymynydd	Gwernymynydd*; Nercwys*	
Halkyn	Halkyn* (Halkyn, Rhesycae and Rhosesmor wards)	
Hawarden	Hawarden* (Hawarden ward)	
Higher Kinnerton	Higher Kinnerton*	
Holywell Central	Holywell (town)* (Central ward)	
Holywell East	Holywell (town)* (East ward)	
Holywell West	Holywell (town)* (West ward)	
Hope	Hope* (Hope ward)	
Leeswood	Leeswood*	
Llanfynydd	Llanfynydd*	
Mancot	Hawarden* (Mancot ward)	
Mold Broncoed	Mold (town)* (Broncoed ward)	
Mold East	Mold (town)* (East ward)	
Mold South	Mold (town)* (South ward)	
Mold West	Mold (town)* (West ward)	
Mostyn	Mostyn*	
New Brighton	Argoed* (New Brighton and West wards)	
Northop	Northop*	
Northop Hall	Northop Hall*	
Penyffordd	Penyffordd*	
Queensferry	Queensferry*	
Saltney Mold Junction	Saltney* (Mold Junction ward)	
Saltney Stonebridge	Saltney* (Stonebridge ward)	
Sealand	Sealand*	
Shotton East	Shotton (town)* (East ward)	
Shotton Higher	Shotton (town)* (Higher ward)	
Shotton West	Shotton (town)* (West ward)	
Trelawnyd and Gwaenysgor	Trelawnyd and Gwaenysgor*; Llanasa* (Axton ward)	
Treuddyn	Treuddyn*	
Whitford	Whitford*	
