= Clwyd County Council =

Welsh local governing body (1974–1996)

Clwyd County Council Cyngor Sir Clwyd

History
- Founded: 1 April 1974
- Disbanded: 31 March 1996
- Succeeded by: Flintshire; Wrexham County Borough; Denbighshire; Parts of Conwy

Meeting place
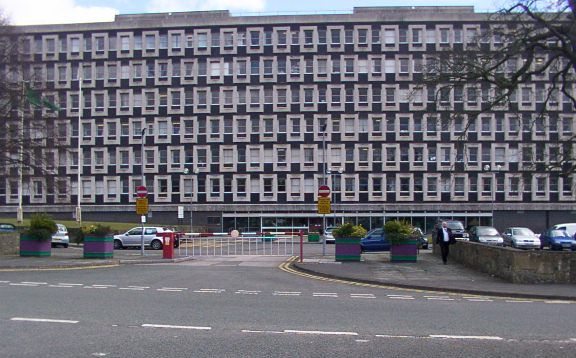
- Shire Hall, Mold

Clwyd County Council (Welsh: Cyngor Sir Clwyd) was the county council of the county of Clwyd in north-east Wales, from its creation in 1974 to its abolition in 1996. It came into its powers on 1 April 1974. The county council was based at the Shire Hall in Mold. On 1 April 1996, under the Local Government (Wales) Act 1994, Clwyd County Council was broken up and replaced with the following authorities: Flintshire, Wrexham County Borough, Denbighshire and parts of Conwy.

== Political control ==
The first election to the county council was held in 1973, initially operating as a shadow authority alongside the outgoing authorities until it came into its powers on 1 April 1974. Political control of the council from 1974 until its abolition in 1996 was as follows:

Party in control	Years
No overall control	1976–1989
Labour	1989–1996

== Premises ==
The council was based at Shire Hall in Mold. The building had opened in 1968 as the headquarters of the original Flintshire County Council. After the abolition of Clwyd County Council in 1996 the building passed to the re-established Flintshire County Council.
