= Delyn (Senedd constituency) =

Senedd constituency (1999–2026)

Coordinates: 53.252°N 3.193°W

- Former Senedd county constituency for the Senedd

- Delyn shown within the North Wales electoral region and the region shown within Wales

Former Senedd county constituency
- Created: 1999
- Abolished: 2026
- Party: Labour
- MS: Hannah Blythyn
- Preserved county: Clwyd

Delyn was a constituency of the Senedd. It elected one Member of the Senedd by the first past the post method of election. Also, however, it was one of nine constituencies in the North Wales electoral region, which elected four additional members, in addition to nine constituency members, to produce a degree of proportional representation for the region as a whole.

== Boundaries ==
Map of 1999–2026 boundaries

The constituency was created for the first election to the Assembly, in 1999, with the name and boundaries of the Delyn Westminster constituency. It was entirely within the preserved county of Clwyd.

As created in 1999, the North Wales region included the constituencies of Alyn and Deeside, Caernarfon, Clwyd West, Clwyd South, Conwy, Delyn, Vale of Clwyd, Wrexham and Ynys Môn. From the 2007 election the region included Aberconwy, Alyn and Deeside, Arfon, Clwyd South, Clwyd West, Delyn, Vale of Clwyd, Wrexham and Ynys Môn.

== Voting ==
In elections for the Senedd, each voter had two votes. The first vote was for a candidate for the voter's constituency, elected by the first past the post system. The second vote was for a regional closed party list of candidates. Additional member seats are allocated from the lists by the d'Hondt method, with constituency results being taken into account in the allocation.

== Assembly members and Members of the Senedd ==
Election	Member	Party	Portrait
1999	Alison Halford	Labour	
2003	Sandy Mewies	Labour	
2016	Hannah Blythyn	Labour	

== Elections ==
=== Elections in the 2020s ===
2021 Senedd election: Delyn
Party	Candidate	Constituency			Regional		
Party	Candidate	Votes	%	±%	Votes	%	±%
Labour	Hannah Blythyn (Note: Incumbent member for this constituency)	12,846	48.6	+7.7	10,423	39.6	+5.0
Conservative	Mark Isherwood (Note: Incumbent member on the party list, or for another constituency)	9,135	34.5	+9.0	8,640	32.8	+9.5
Plaid Cymru	Paul Rowlinson	2,097	7.9	-1.9	3,052	11.6	±0.0
Liberal Democrats	Andrew Parkhurst	1,094	4.1	-3.3	1,105	4.2	-1.8
UKIP	Mary Davies	862	3.3	-13.1	548	2.1	-12.6
Reform	Aiden Down	297	1.1	New	264	1.0	New
Gwlad	Anthony Williams	112	0.4	New	121	0.5	New
Abolish					1,131	4.3	-1.5
Green					704	2.7	+0.9
Freedom Alliance (UK)					147	0.6	New
Communist					60	0.2	-0.1
Independent	Michelle Brown				49	0.2	New
Propel					45	0.2	New
TUSC					25	0.1	New
Majority		3,711	14.1	−1.3			
Turnout		26,303	46.81	+3.5			
Labour hold		Swing					

=== Elections in the 2010s ===
Welsh Assembly Election 2016: Delyn
Party	Candidate	Constituency			Regional		
Party	Candidate	Votes	%	±%	Votes	%	±%
Labour	Hannah Blythyn	9,480	40.9	−5.2	8,004	34.6	-3.0
Conservative	Huw Williams	5,898	25.5	−8.2	5,399	23.3	-6.2
UKIP	Nigel Williams	3,794	16.4	New	3,403	14.7	+9.3
Plaid Cymru	Paul Rowlinson	2,269	9.8	−2.8	2,681	11.6	-1.6
Liberal Democrats	Tom Rippeth	1,718	7.4	−0.2	1,390	6.0	-0.1
Abolish					1,332	5.8	New
Green					417	1.8	-0.1
Association of Welsh Independents					234	1.0	New
Monster Raving Loony					148	0.6	New
Mark Young - Independent					87	0.4	New
Communist					63	0.3	+0.1
Majority		3,582	15.4	+3.0			
Turnout		23,159	43.3	+0.3			
Labour hold		Swing	+1.5				

Welsh Assembly Election 2011: Delyn
Party	Candidate	Constituency			Regional		
Party	Candidate	Votes	%	±%	Votes	%	±%
Labour	Sandy Mewies	10,695	46.1	+11.5	8,690	37.6	+6.7
Conservative	Matthew Wright	7,814	33.7	+1.4	6,819	29.5	-0.4
Plaid Cymru	Carrie Harper	2,918	12.6	−2.1	3,044	13.2	-5.5
Liberal Democrats	Michele Jones	1,767	7.6	−4.7	1,420	6.1	+0.3
UKIP					1,241	5.4	+1.3
BNP					579	2.5	-3.2
Socialist Labour					540	2.3	+0.8
Green					444	1.9	-0.7
Welsh Christian					203	0.9	±0.0
Weyman - Independent					92	0.4	New
Communist					56	0.2	-0.3
Majority		2,881	12.4	+10.1			
Turnout		23,194	43.0	+1.9			
Labour hold		Swing	+5.1				

Regional ballots rejected: 254

=== Elections in the 2000s ===
Welsh Assembly Election 2007: Delyn
Party	Candidate	Constituency			Regional		
Party	Candidate	Votes	%	±%	Votes	%	±%
Labour	Sandy Mewies	7,507	34.6	−4.0	6,470	29.9	-6.7
Conservative	Antoinette Sandbach	6,996	32.3	+3.3	6,464	29.9	+5.0
Plaid Cymru	Meg Elis	3,179	14.7	−0.7	4,049	18.7	+3.6
Liberal Democrats	Ian Matthews	2,669	12.3	−4.7	1,245	5.8	-6.9
UKIP	Derek Bigg	1,318	6.1	New	877	4.1	+1.5
BNP					1,236	5.7	New
Green					570	2.6	-0.1
Socialist Labour					326	1.5	New
Welsh Christian					189	0.9	New
Communist					116	0.5	New
CPA					73	0.3	New
Majority		511	2.3	−7.2			
Turnout		21,669	41.1	+10.1			
Labour hold		Swing	−3.7				

Welsh Assembly Election 2003: Delyn
Party	Candidate	Constituency			Regional		
Party	Candidate	Votes	%	±%	Votes	%	±%
Labour	Sandy Mewies	6,520	38.6	−6.1	6,184	36.6	
Conservative	Mark Isherwood	4,896	29.0	+7.0	4,207	24.9	
Liberal Democrats	David P. Lloyd	2,880	17.1	+4.1	2,151	12.7	
Plaid Cymru	Paul J. Rowlinson	2,588	15.3	−5.0	2,549	15.1	
John Marek Independent Party					661	3.9	
Green					464	2.7	
UKIP					445	2.6	
ProLife Alliance					93	0.6	
Cymru Annibynnol					85	0.5	
Communist					59	0.3	
Majority		1,624	9.6	−13.1			
Turnout		17,073	31.4	−12.8			
Labour hold		Swing	−6.6				

2003 Electorate: 54,426
Regional ballots rejected: 203

=== Elections in the 1990s ===
Welsh Assembly Election 1999: Delyn
Party	Candidate	Constituency			Regional		
Party	Candidate	Votes	%	±%	Votes	%	±%
Labour	Alison Halford	10,672	44.7	N/A	9,909	41.6	N/A
Conservative	Karen Lumley	5,255	22.0	N/A	5,000	21.0	N/A
Plaid Cymru	Meg Elis	4,837	20.3	N/A	4,955	20.8	N/A
Liberal Democrats	Eleanor Burnham	3,089	13.0	N/A	3,091	13.0	N/A
Green					Unknown	Unknown	N/A
Rhuddlan Debt Protest Campaign					Unknown	Unknown	N/A
United Socialist					Unknown	Unknown	N/A
Communist					Unknown	Unknown	N/A
Natural Law					Unknown	Unknown	N/A
Above list parties					842	3.5	N/A
Majority		5,417	22.7	N/A			
Turnout		23,853	44.2	N/A			
Labour win (new seat)							

== See also ==
- North Wales (Senedd electoral region)
- Senedd constituencies and electoral regions
