= Conwy & Denbighshire NHS Trust =

Former NHS trust in Wales

Conwy & Denbighshire NHS Trust was an NHS Trust in Wales. The headquarters of the Trust were in Glan Clwyd Hospital, in Bodelwyddan, near Rhyl, Denbighshire. The Trust was named in the 'Top 40 Hospitals' in the UK for the fifth year running in 2006, a title conferred by CHKS.

== History ==
The Trust formed on 1 April 1999, through a merger of the Glan Clwyd District General Hospital NHS Trust with parts of the Clwydian Community Care NHS Trust (the other half being absorbed by the North East Wales NHS Trust, and part of the Gwynedd Community Health Trust (the other parts forming the North West Wales NHS Trust).

The Trust served the population of central North Wales, across Conwy county borough and Denbighshire. It had 5,325 staff as of 1 April 2006. The Acting Chairman was Mr Alun Lewis.

The Conwy & Denbighshire NHS Trust ran one major acute hospital (Glan Clwyd Hospital), two further acute hospitals (H.M. Stanley in St. Asaph), and Abergele Hospital, 6 community hospitals, and mental health units.

It was confirmed in April 2008 that the Conwy & Denbighshire NHS Trust intended to merge with the North East Wales NHS Trust. Both trusts agreed to the merger, and approval from the health minister was given on 22 May 2008. The Trust was temporarily merged into the North Wales NHS Trust on 1 April 2009, and after further reconfiguration into a new organisation, combining all three NHS Trusts in North Wales called the Betsi Cadwaladr University Local Health Board on 1 October 2009.

== Major hospitals ==
Major hospitals were:

- Abergele Hospital
- Colwyn Bay Community Hospital
- Conwy Hospital, Conwy, closed in 2003.
- Denbigh Community Hospital
- Glan Clwyd Hospital.
- H.M. Stanley Hospital, St. Asaph, closed April 2012.
- Llangollen Community Hospital, closed March 2013.
- Prestatyn Community Hospital, closed spring 2013.
- Royal Alexandra Hospital, Rhyl
- Ruthin Community Hospital, Ruthin.
