= North East Wales NHS Trust =

Former NHS trust in Wales

North East Wales NHS Trust (Welsh: Ymddiriedolaeth GIG Gogledd Ddwyrain Cymru) was an NHS Trust in Wales. The headquarters of the Trust were in the Maelor Hospital, in Wrexham. It was founded on 1 April 1999, when the NHS Trusts in Wales were reconfigured. The Trust provided secondary care services for the Wrexham and Flintshire Local Authority areas, including mental health care – a population of around 300,000 people, through one major acute hospital, five community hospitals, and a variety of clinics. The Trust reported a budget deficit of £3.6 million at the end of the 2005/06 financial year.

It was confirmed in April 2008 that the North East Wales NHS Trust intended to merge with the Conwy & Denbighshire NHS Trust. Both trusts agreed to the merger, and approval from the health minister was given on 22 May 2008. The new trust became operational as the North Wales NHS Trust as of 1 July 2008

As of 1 October 2009 the trust was merged with the North West Wales NHS Trust, and the six Local Health Boards of Anglesey, Conwy, Denbighshire, Flintshire, Gwynedd and Wrexham to form the Betsi Cadwaladr University Health Board.

== Major hospitals ==
Major hospitals were as follows:

- Chirk Community Hospital
- Deeside Community Hospital
- Flint Community Hospital, closed in 2012.
- Holywell Community Hospital
- Lluesty Hospital, closed in 2008.
- Mold Community Hospital
- Penley Community Hospital, closed in 2002.
- Wrexham Maelor Hospital
