= North West Wales NHS Trust =

Former NHS trust in Wales

- Ymddiriedolaeth GIG Gogledd Gorllewin Cymru
- Successor: Betsi Cadwaladr University Health Board
- Formation: April 1, 1999; 27 years ago
- Dissolved: October 1, 2009; 16 years ago
- Legal status: NHS trust
- Headquarters: Ysbyty Gwynedd, Bangor
- Affiliations: NHS Wales
- Staff: 5000 (2010)
- Website: northwestwales.org (Defunct)

North West Wales NHS Trust (Welsh: Ymddiriedolaeth GIG Gogledd Gorllewin Cymru) was an NHS trust in Wales. It was founded on 1 April 1999.

On 1 October 2009 the trust was merged with the North Wales NHS Trust and the local health boards to form Betsi Cadwaladr University Health Board.

== Major hospitals ==
- Ysbyty Gwynedd, Bangor
- Llandudno General Hospital
- Ysbyty Penrhos Stanley, Holyhead
