= Ffestiniog Memorial Hospital =

Former hospital in Gwynedd, Wales

- Betsi Cadwaladr University Health Board
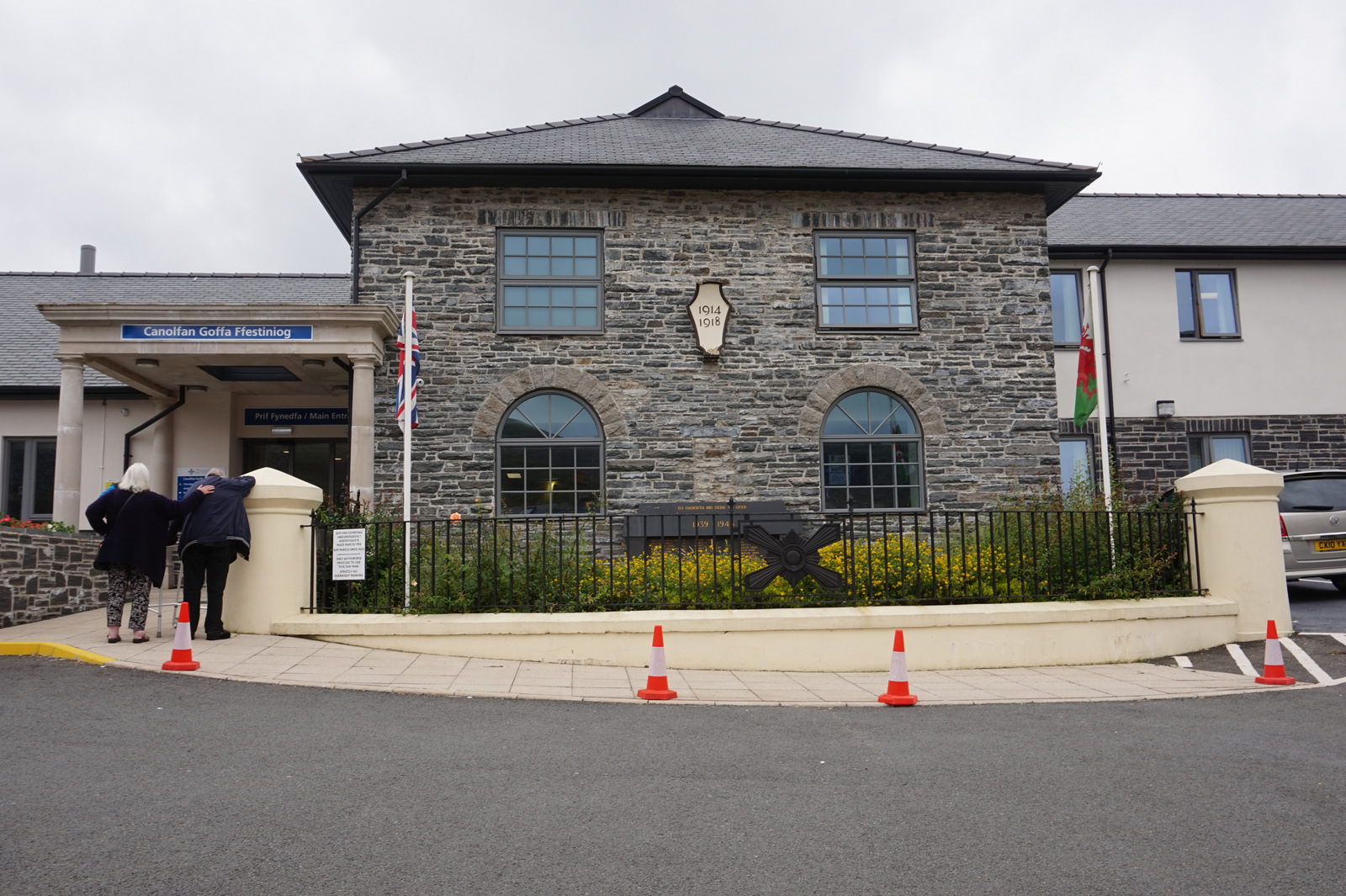
- Ffestiniog Memorial Hospital

- Shown in Gwynedd

Geography
- Location: Blaenau Ffestiniog, Gwynedd, Wales
- Coordinates: 52.9916°N 3.9350°W

Organisation
- Care system: NHS Wales
- Type: Community

History
- Founded: 1927
- Closed: 2013

Links
- Lists: Hospitals in Wales

Ffestiniog Memorial Hospital (Welsh: Ysbyty Coffa Ffestiniog) was a hospital in Blaenau Ffestiniog, Gwynedd, Wales. Closed in 2013, it was managed by the Betsi Cadwaladr University Health Board. The building re-opened as Canolfan Goffa Ffestiniog health centre in 2017.

== History ==
The facility, which was designed by Clough Williams-Ellis, was officially opened by Colonel David Davies MP as the Festiniog and District Heroes Memorial Hospital in 1927. It was intended to commemorate local soldiers who had died in the First World War. After joining the National Health Service in 1948, it developed as a community hospital but, after inpatient services transferred to Ysbyty Alltwen in Tremadog, it closed to inpatients in March 2013. It then re-opened as the Canolfan Goffa Ffestiniog (meaning: Ffestiniog Memorial Centre) health centre in November 2017.
