= Lluesty Hospital =

- Betsi Cadwaladr University Health Board
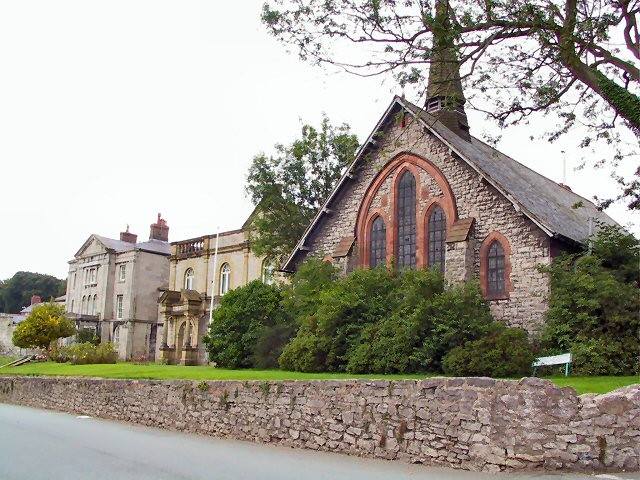
- Holywell Chapel with the old Lluesty Hospital in the background

- Shown in Flintshire

Geography
- Location: Holywell, Flintshire, Wales, United Kingdom
- Coordinates: 53.2663°N 3.2168°W

Organisation
- Care system: NHS Wales
- Type: Community Hospital

History
- Founded: 1840
- Closed: 2008

Links
- Lists: Hospitals in Wales

Lluesty Hospital (Welsh: Ysbyty Lluesty) was a community hospital in Holywell, Flintshire, Wales. It was managed by the Betsi Cadwaladr University Health Board.

== History ==
The hospital had its origins in the Holywell Union Workhouse which was designed by John Welch and completed in 1840. A separate infirmary was added in 1913. The facility became the Luesty Public Assistance Institution in 1930 and then joined the National Health Service as Lluesty General Hospital in 1948. After services transferred to Holywell Community Hospital, Lluesty Hospital closed in 2008.
