= Stanley Sailors' Hospital =

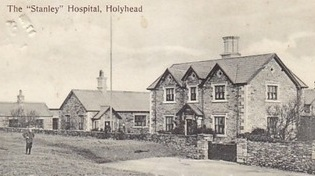
- Stanley Sailors' Hospital

- Shown in Anglesey

Geography
- Location: Holyhead, Anglesey, Wales
- Coordinates: 53.3093°N 4.6290°W

Organisation
- Care system: NHS Wales
- Type: Community

History
- Founded: 1871
- Closed: 1987

Links
- Lists: Hospitals in Wales

Stanley Sailors' Hospital (Welsh: Ysbyty Morwyr Stanley) was a health facility in Holyhead, Anglesey, Wales.

== History ==
The hospital was financed by a gift from William Owen Stanley of Plas Penrhos who had wanted to establish a facility to provide healthcare to sailors. It was officially opened in 1871. During the First World War it served as a military hospital with Jane Henrietta Adeane, a niece of the founder, as its commandant. When the Elder Dempster liner SS Apapa was torpedoed off Anglesey in November 1917, survivors were taken to the hospital to be treated. The facility then served as a convalescent home for disabled servicemen before joining the National Health Service as a community hospital in 1948. After services transferred to Valley Hospital, Stanley Sailors' Hospital closed in 1987. The buildings were subsequently demolished and the site was redeveloped as a ferry terminal.
