= Minffordd Hospital =

- Betsi Cadwaladr University Health Board
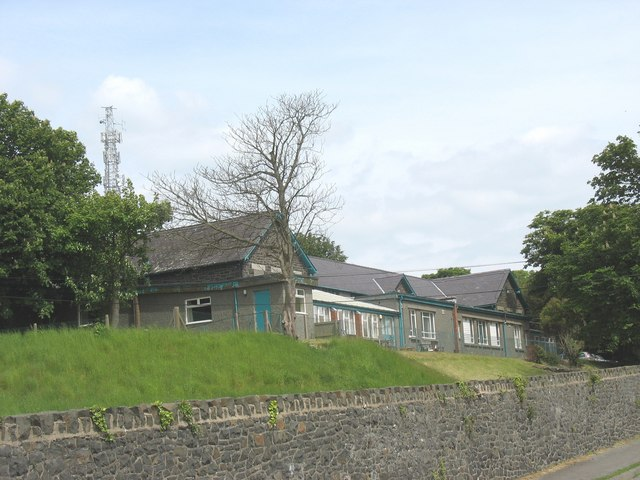
- Minffordd Hospital

- Shown in Gwynedd

Geography
- Location: Bangor, Gwynedd, Wales
- Coordinates: 53.2172°N 4.1293°W

Organisation
- Care system: NHS Wales
- Type: Community

History
- Founded: 1895
- Closed: 2006

Links
- Lists: Hospitals in Wales

Minffordd Hospital (Welsh: Ysbyty Minffordd) was a health facility in Bangor, Gwynedd, Wales. It was managed by the Betsi Cadwaladr University Health Board.

== History ==
The facility was established on a part of the Penrhyn Estate as an isolation hospital in 1895. An additional hospital wing was added in 1937 and, after joining the National Health Service in 1948, it served as a convalescent home. After services had transferred to Ysbyty Gwynedd, it closed in 1984 but then re-opened as a mental health facility in 1988. It finally closed completely in 2006 and Gwynedd Council approved demolition of the deteriorating buildings in August 2019.
