= Minffordd =

Coordinates: 52.926°N 4.081°W

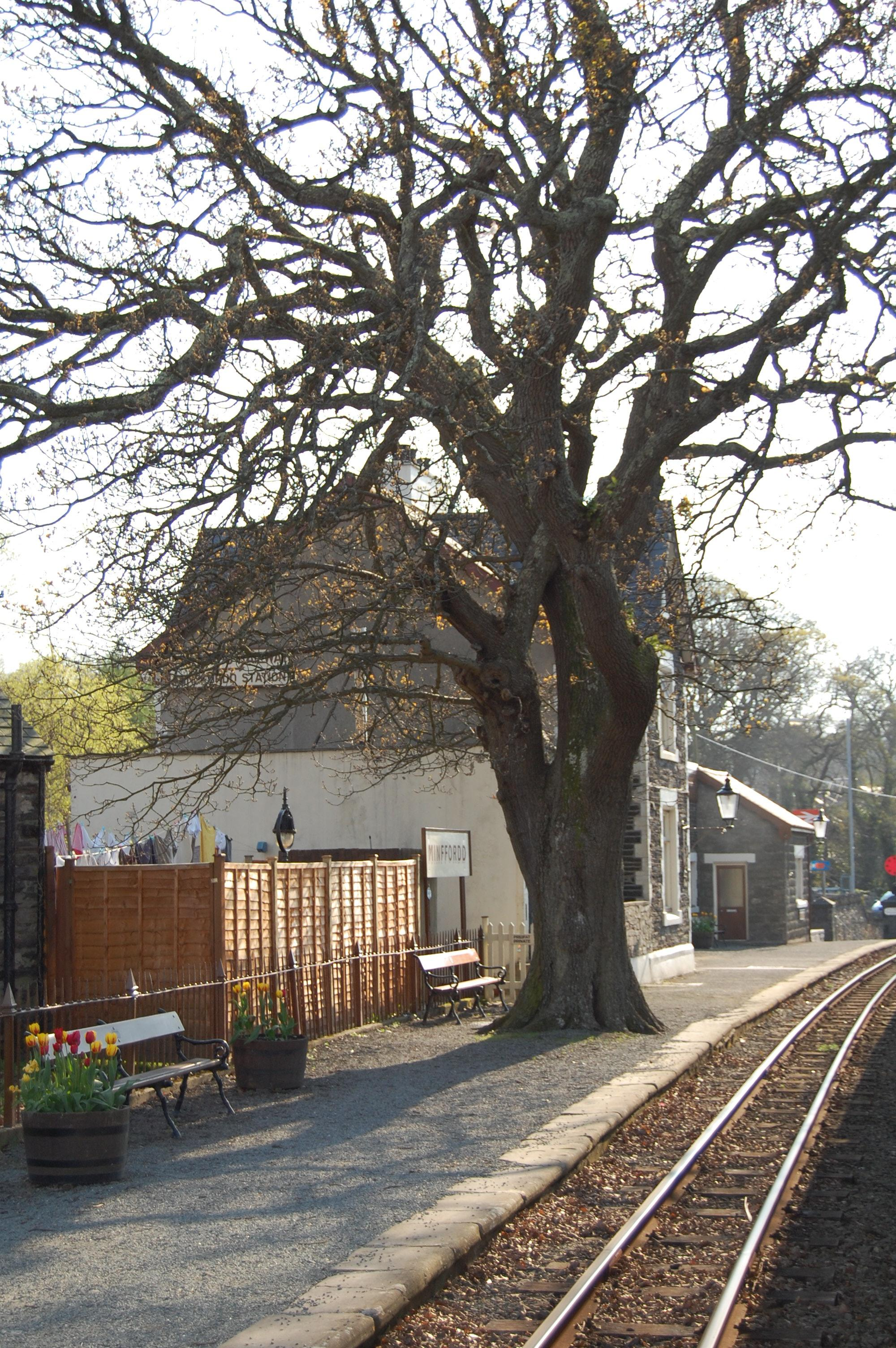
- Minffordd Railway Station

- Location within Gwynedd
- OS grid reference: SH601386
- Community: Penrhyndeudraeth
- Principal area: Gwynedd
- Country: Wales
- Sovereign state: United Kingdom
- Post town: PENRHYNDEUDRAETH
- Postcode district: LL48
- Dialling code: 01766
- Police: North Wales
- Fire: North Wales
- Ambulance: Welsh
- UK Parliament: Dwyfor Meirionnydd
- Senedd Cymru – Welsh Parliament: Dwyfor Meirionnydd

Minffordd (Welsh pronunciation; roadside in Welsh) is a village within the Welsh county of Gwynedd. It is situated on the A487 road between Porthmadog and Penrhyndeudraeth, and in the community of the latter.

The village has two adjacent railway stations, which are served both by Cambrian Line mainline train services and the narrow gauge Ffestiniog Railway. In 1992 the Ffestiniog Railway built a hostel to house volunteers working on the line.

The stations are approximately quarter of a mile from the start of the mile-long drive to the Italianate hotel-village of Portmeirion.

Nearby are the minor remains of a medieval castle (known variously as Castell Deudraeth, Castell Gwain Goch and Castell Aber Iau). The castle was first recorded by Giraldus Cambrensis (Gerald of Wales) in his 1191 Itinerarium Kambriae, writing about his 1188 preaching tour of Wales.

Garth Quarry was opened in 1870 to produce granite setts for transport to developing towns and cities by the newly opened Cambrian Railways. The quarry now produces roadstone and railway ballast.

Ysbyty Bron y Garth was built as the Ffestiniog Union Workhouse in 1839 at a cost of £3,200 and was intended to house 150 inmates. In recent years the buildings were used as a community hospital operated by North West Wales NHS Trust. In 2009 the hospital was replaced by Ysbyty Alltwen at Tremadog. Part of the site houses over 400 lesser horseshoe bats.

Minffordd is a thriving Welsh speaking village, where the language is used every day.
