= Bryn Beryl Hospital =

- Betsi Cadwaladr University Health Board
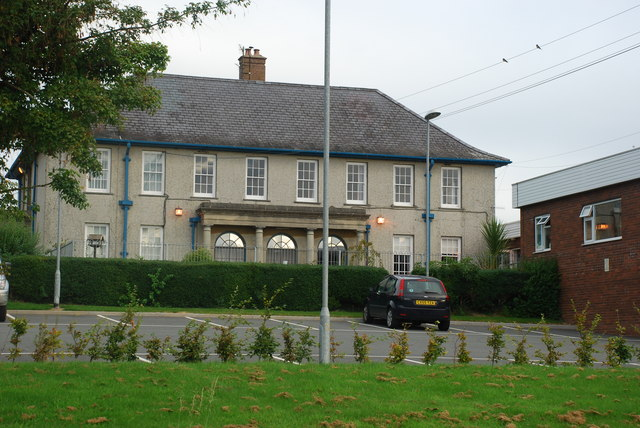
- Bryn Beryl Hospital

- Shown in Gwynedd

Geography
- Location: Pwllheli, Gwynedd, Wales
- Coordinates: 52.9122°N 4.3949°W

Organisation
- Care system: NHS Wales
- Type: Community

History
- Founded: 1924

Links
- Lists: Hospitals in Wales

Bryn Beryl Hospital (Welsh: Ysbyty Bryn Beryl) is a health facility in Pwllheli, Gwynedd, Wales. It is managed by the Betsi Cadwaladr University Health Board.

== History ==
The hospital was established as the Pwllheli Cottage Hospital in 1924. It was extended by the erection of two wards to create a naval hospital to support the naval training facility HMS Glendower during the Second World War. After it joined the National Health Service in 1948, a prefabricated ward block for geriatric patients was added in 1974. The new Llynfor Ward was opened in newly-refurbished facilities in July 2019.
