= Bryn y Neuadd Hospital =

- Betsi Cadwaladr University Health Board
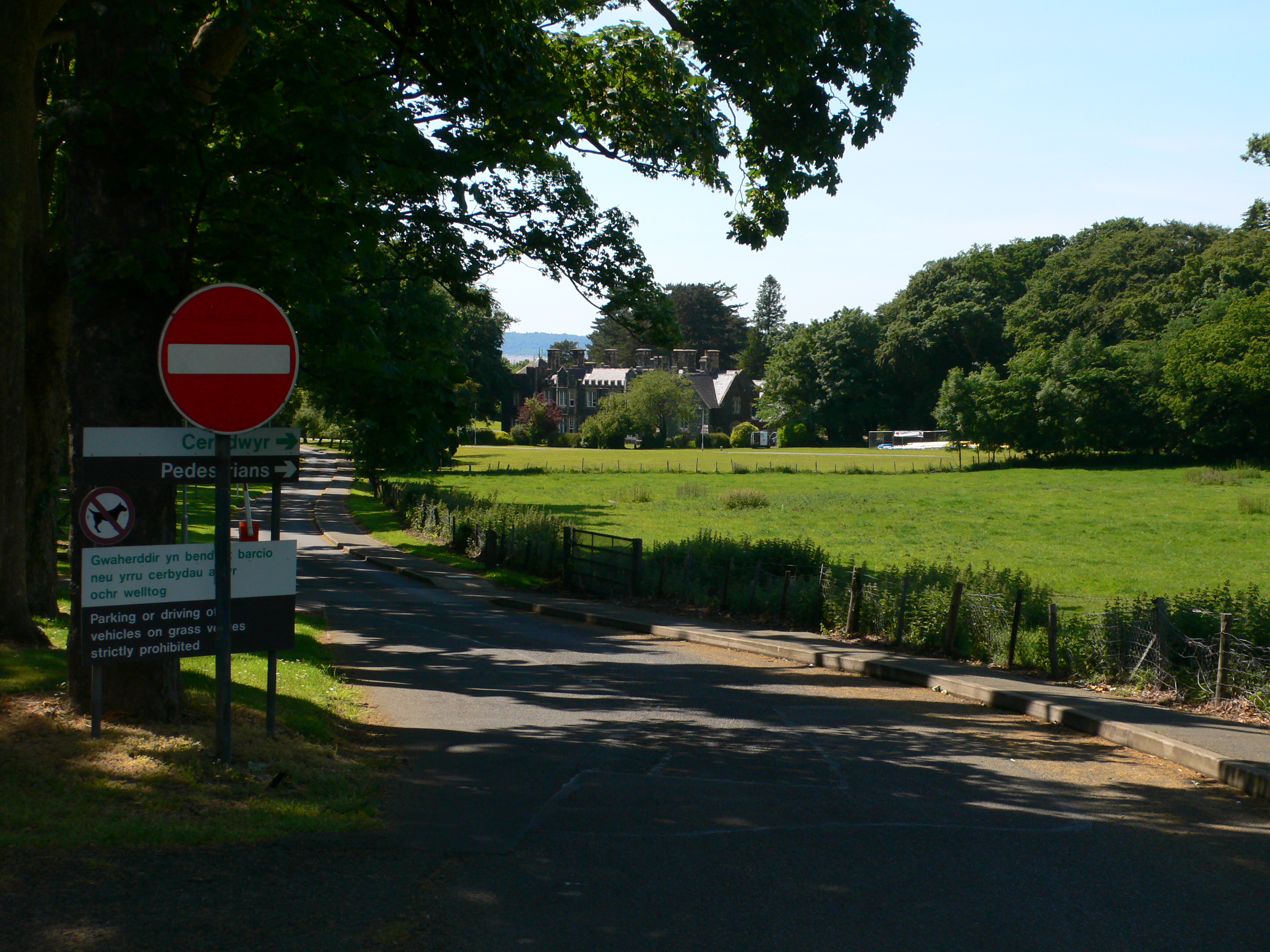
- Bryn y Neuadd Hospital

- Shown in Conwy County Borough

Geography
- Location: Llanfairfechan, Conwy County Borough, Wales
- Coordinates: 53.2536°N 3.9851°W

Organisation
- Care system: NHS Wales
- Type: Specialist

Services
- Speciality: Mental health

History
- Founded: 1898

Links
- Lists: Hospitals in Wales

Bryn y Neuadd Hospital (Welsh: Ysbyty Bryn y Neuadd) is a mental health facility in Llanfairfechan, Conwy County Borough, Wales. It is managed by the Betsi Cadwaladr University Health Board.

== History ==
The hospital was established by converting a mid-19th-century Italian Gothic style mansion into a facility to care for "lunatics and idiots" in 1898. The mansion, which benefited from a garden laid out by Edward Milner, was demolished in 1967 and replaced with a modern facility for mentally handicapped patients which opened in 1971. A medium-secure unit known as Tŷ Llywelyn was subsequently established at the hospital.

The gardens and grounds by Milner are designated Grade II on the Cadw/ICOMOS Register of Parks and Gardens of Special Historic Interest in Wales.
