= Penley Community Hospital =

- Betsi Cadwaladr University Health Board
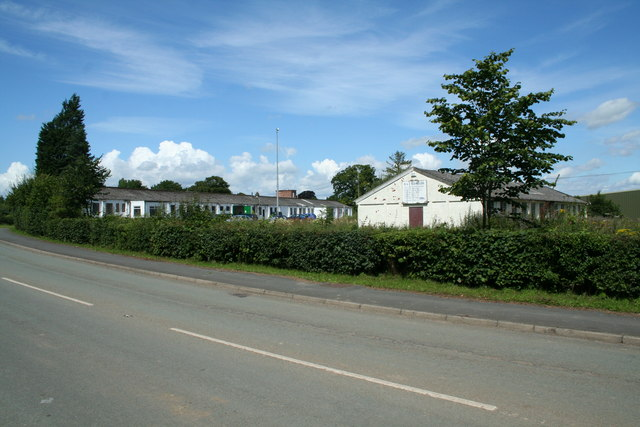
- Penley Community Hospital

- Shown in Wrexham County Borough

Geography
- Location: Penley, Wales, United Kingdom
- Coordinates: 52.9540°N 2.8703°W

Organisation
- Care system: Public NHS
- Type: Community hospital

Services
- Emergency department: No Accident & Emergency

History
- Founded: 1946
- Closed: 2002

Links
- Website: www.wales.nhs.uk/sitesplus/861/page/42950
- Lists: Hospitals in Wales

Penley Community Hospital (Welsh: Ysbyty Cymuned Llannerch Banna) is a former community hospital dedicated to Polish ex-servicemen in Penley, Wales. It was managed by North East Wales NHS Trust and closed in 2002.

== History ==
The site was a United States Army hospital during the Second World War. The hospital was founded in 1946, as part of an initiative to care for Polish ex-servicemen who fought alongside the Allies in the Second World War, as well as their families, who settled in the area. As a result of this influx, the population of Penley increased threefold. Residents at the hospital and camp included the Polish military commander, Wacław Przeździecki. At its peak, in the early 1950s, the hospital housed more than 2,000 patients and staff. By 2002 just 6 patients remained and the hospital closed.

The original hospital building (which had space for 30 wards but was now only using one) was subsequently demolished and a small, modern facility was opened in 2004, with 8 individual rooms for the surviving Polish residents.
