= Tywyn Hospital =

- Betsi Cadwaladr University Health Board
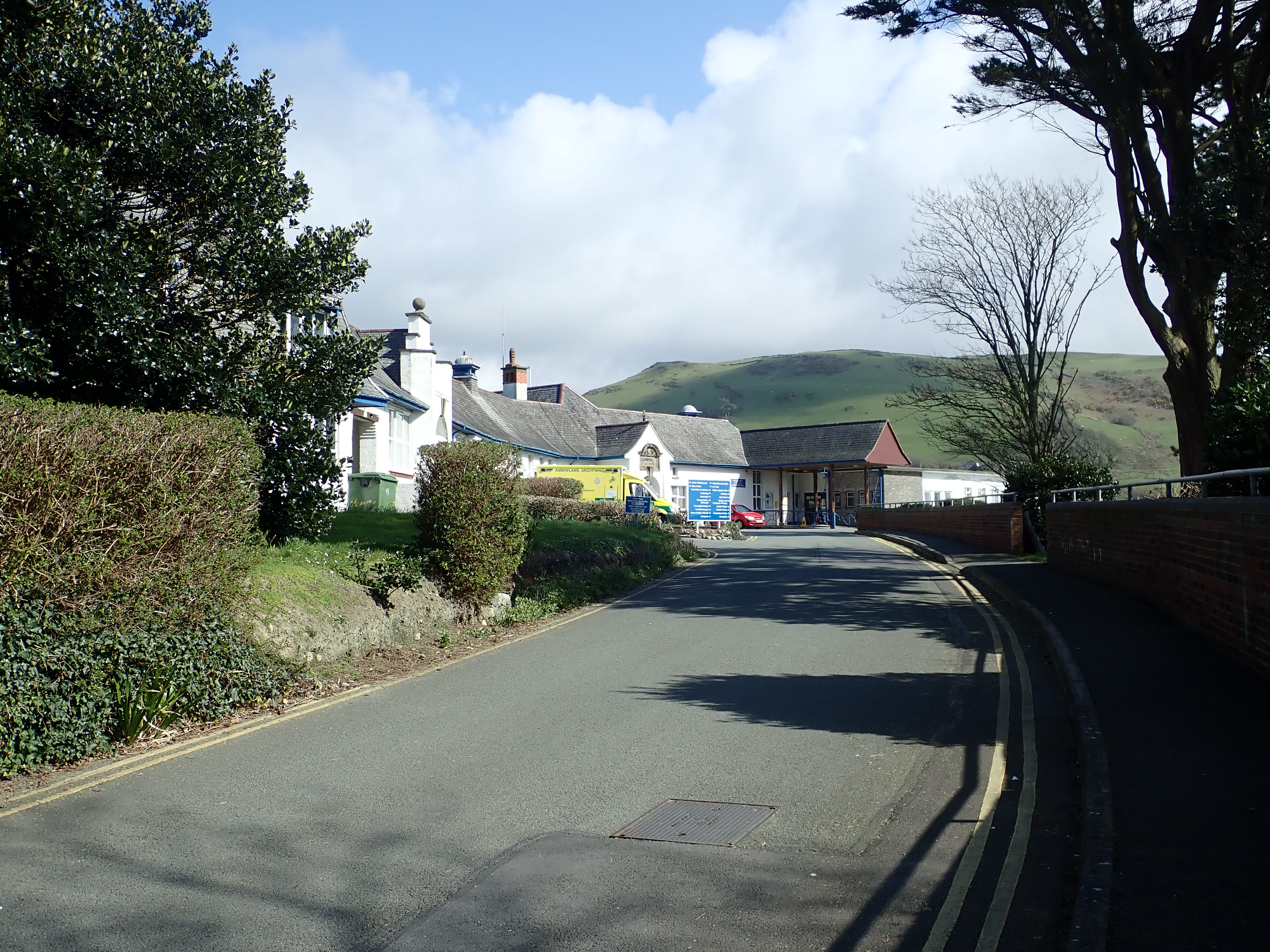
- Tywyn Hospital

- Shown in Gwynedd

Geography
- Location: Tywyn, Gwynedd, Wales
- Coordinates: 52.5840°N 4.0809°W

Organisation
- Care system: NHS Wales
- Type: Community

History
- Founded: 1922

Links
- Lists: Hospitals in Wales

Tywyn Hospital (Welsh: Ysbyty Tywyn) is a health facility in Tywyn, Gwynedd, Wales. It is managed by the Betsi Cadwaladr University Health Board.

== History ==
The Towyn and District War Memorial Cottage Hospital was established on the outskirts of the town, on land known as Pen-y-bryn Mawr that was gifted by Thomas Corbett of Ynysymaengwyn. The foundation stone was laid by Dame Margaret Lloyd George on 11 August 1920 and the hospital was officially opened by Sir Osmond Williams on 17 August 1922. As indicated by its original name, the hospital was built to commemorate local soldiers who had died in the First World War. It originally had accommodation for eight beds and an operating theatre and cost £8,000 to build.

A maternity unit was added in 1932 and, after it joined the National Health Service in 1948, a continuing care ward was opened by the Duke of Edinburgh in 1973. An expansion involving an additional 16-bed ward and a new primary care centre was completed in 2016.
