= Cefni Hospital =

- Betsi Cadwaladr University Health Board
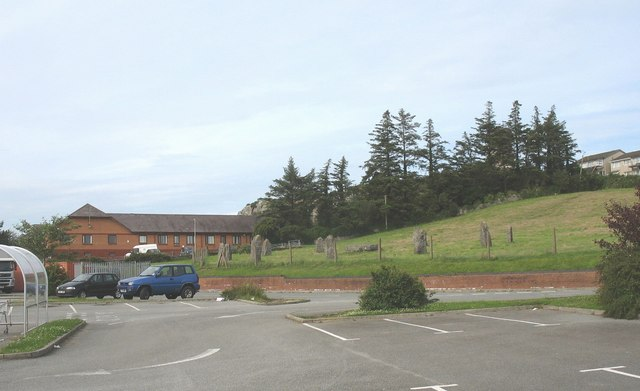
- Cefni Hospital

- Shown in Anglesey

Geography
- Location: Llangefni, Anglesey, Wales
- Coordinates: 53.2566°N 4.3041°W

Organisation
- Care system: NHS Wales
- Type: Specialist

Services
- Speciality: Care for the elderly

History
- Founded: 1993

Links
- Lists: Hospitals in Wales

Cefni Hospital (Welsh: Ysbyty Cefni) is a health facility in Llangefni, Anglesey, Wales. It is managed by the Betsi Cadwaladr University Health Board.

== History ==
The original hospital on the site was built in the early 20th century. The site was redeveloped to create a substantially enlarged facility, intended to facilitate the closure of the aging Druid Isolation Hospital, in 1993. The enlarged facility became a facility for older people with memory difficulties in 2009.
