= Prestatyn Community Hospital =

Former hospital in Denbighshire, Wales

- Betsi Cadwaladr University Health Board
- Shown in Denbighshire

Geography
- Location: Prestatyn, Denbighshire, Wales, United Kingdom
- Coordinates: 53.3262°N 3.4008°W

Organisation
- Care system: Public NHS
- Type: Community hospital

History
- Founded: 1940s

Links
- Lists: Hospitals in Wales

Prestatyn Community Hospital (Welsh: Ysbyty Cymunedol Prestatyn) was a community hospital in Prestatyn, Wales. It was managed by Betsi Cadwaladr University Health Board.

== History ==
The hospital was established in a former preparatory school building known as Chatsworth House in the late 1940s. It joined the National Health Service as Chatsworth House Maternity Home in 1948 and then became a community hospital in 1973 before finally closing in 2013. The building was demolished and the site redeveloped for residential use in 2015.
