= Dolgellau and Barmouth Hospital =

- Betsi Cadwaladr University Health Board
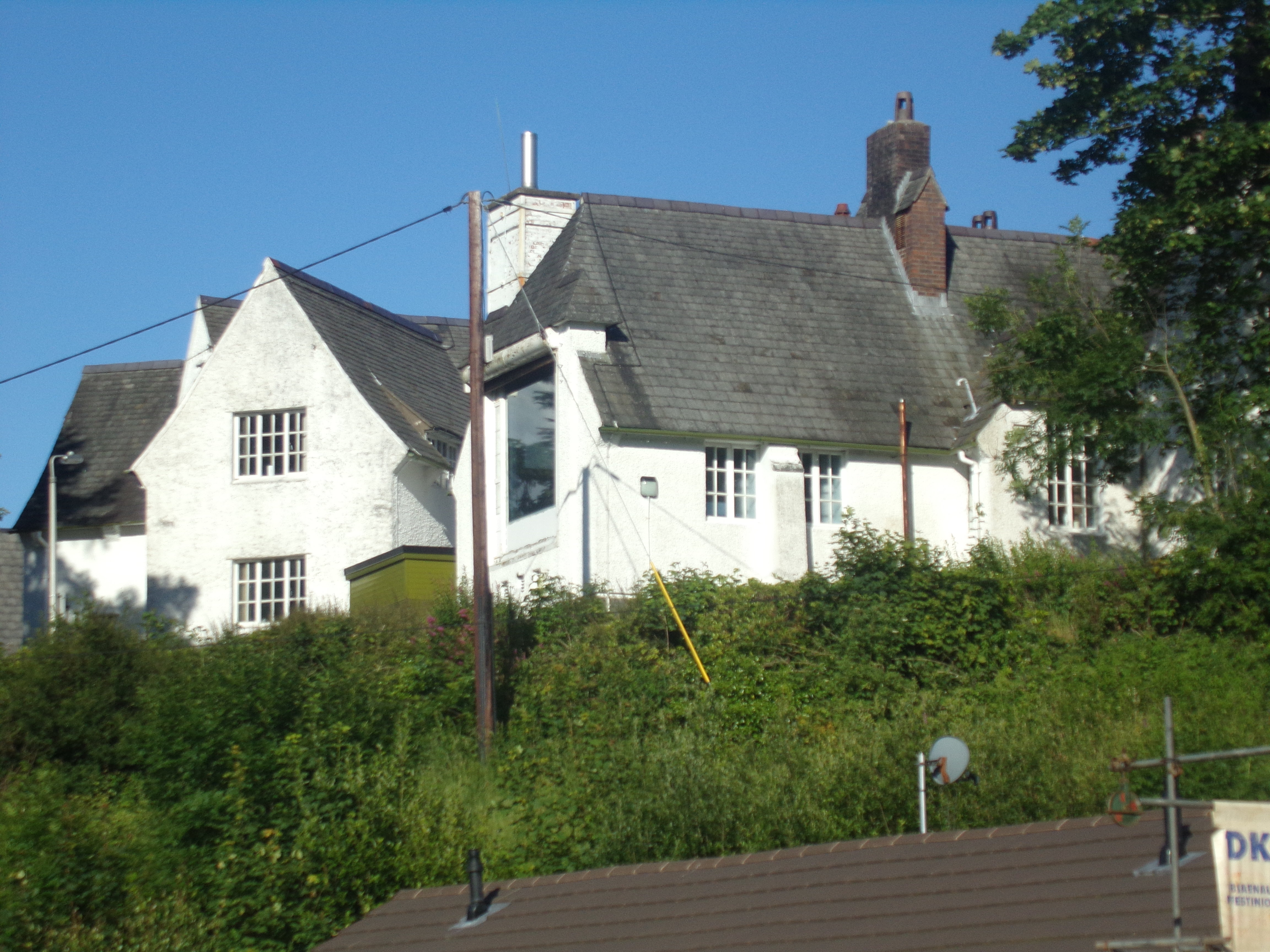
- Dolgellau and Barmouth Hospital

- Shown in Gwynedd

Geography
- Location: Dolgellau, Gwynedd, Wales
- Coordinates: 52.7408°N 3.8819°W

Organisation
- Care system: NHS Wales
- Type: Community

History
- Founded: 1929

Links
- Lists: Hospitals in Wales

Dolgellau and Barmouth Hospital (Welsh: Ysbyty Dolgellau ac Abermaw) is a health facility in Dolgellau, Gwynedd, Wales. It is managed by the Betsi Cadwaladr University Health Board. It is a Grade II listed building.

== History ==
A charitable fund for the purposes of building a local hospital was created in 1902. It was initially established as a small infirmary within part of the Dolgellau Union Poorhouse in 1920. A purpose-built facility, which was designed by Herbert North and Henry Hughes and substantially financed by a bequest from Elizabeth Douthwaite, the widow of a Lancashire merchant, opened in 1929. A consulting room facility was added in 1933 and an operating theatre block was added in 1938 and, after it joined the National Health Service in 1948, it was further extended by the addition of new maternity facilities in 1998.
