= Ysbyty Bron y Garth =

- Betsi Cadwaladr University Health Board
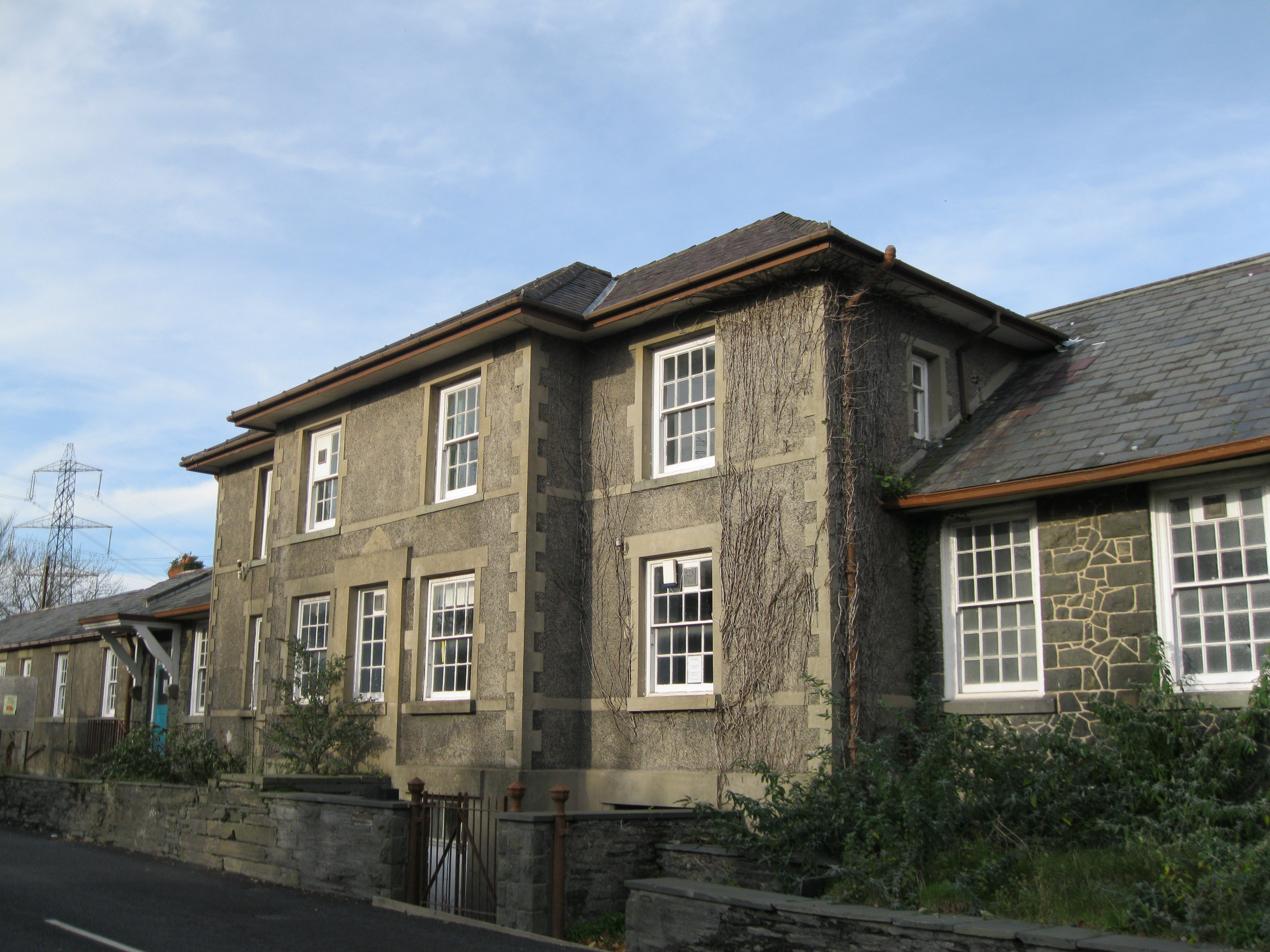
- Ysbyty Bron y Garth

- Shown in Gwynedd

Geography
- Location: Penrhyndeudraeth, Gwynedd, Wales
- Coordinates: 52.9271°N 4.0793°W

Organisation
- Care system: NHS Wales
- Type: General

History
- Founded: 1839
- Closed: 2009

Links
- Lists: Hospitals in Wales

Ysbyty Bron y Garth (English: Bron y Garth Hospital) was a health facility in Penrhyndeudraeth, Gwynedd, Wales. It was managed by the Betsi Cadwaladr University Health Board.

== History ==
The facility has its origins in the Ffestiniog Union Workhouse which opened in 1839. It became the Ffestiniog Public Assistance Institution in 1930 and joined the National Health Service as Bron y Garth Hospital in 1948. After services transferred to Ysbyty Alltwen, Ysbyty Bron y Garth closed in 2009.
