= Ysbyty Eryri =

- Betsi Cadwaladr University Health Board
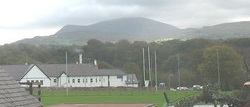
- Viewed from Ffordd Eryri

- Shown in Gwynedd

Geography
- Location: Lôn Parc, Caernarfon, Gwynedd, Wales
- Coordinates: 53.1300°N 4.2628°W

Organisation
- Care system: NHS Wales
- Type: Community

History
- Founded: 1846

Links
- Lists: Hospitals in Wales

Ysbyty Eryri (Welsh for 'Eryri Hospital') is a health facility in Lôn Parc, Caernarfon, Gwynedd, Wales. It is managed by the Betsi Cadwaladr University Health Board, and named after Eryri, the Welsh name for nearby Snowdonia.

== History ==
The facility has its origins in the Caernarfon Union Workhouse which opened in 1846. An infirmary was established in the north-east part of the site in 1914. It became the Caernarfon Public Assistance Institution in 1930 and it joined the National Health Service as Eryri Hospital in 1948. Services were transferred from the Caernarfon Eye and Cottage Hospital when it closed in 1981. X-ray services were reduced by two-thirds in 2013.
