= Murder of Jennifer Mills-Westley =

2011 murder

Jennifer Joan Mills-Westley was murdered on 13 May 2011 in Tenerife.

Her death in a Chinese supermarket in the resort of Los Cristianos gained widespread publicity in the United Kingdom, where she was from, and around the world, for the horrific nature of the apparently random attack by Deyan Valentinov Deyanov, who stabbed Mills-Westley in the neck several times and then beheaded her, carrying her severed head out into the street.

Deyan Deyanov, a Bulgarian man, was convicted on 22 February 2013 of the murder and subsequently sentenced to detention in a psychiatric unit for 20 years.

== Background ==
Mills-Westley was a 60-year-old grandmother of five from Norwich, United Kingdom, who had retired to the Spanish island of Tenerife in 2006. She owned two apartments, each with two bedrooms, on the Port Royale complex in Los Cristianos, one of which she rented to tourists.

== Murder ==
Mills-Westley's murder was widely publicised in the British and international media due to its horrific nature, in which a homeless man stabbed and beheaded her in a busy shop on Avenida Juan Carlos in the town centre. Officials said the man appeared to choose his victim at random, then stabbed her in the neck 14 times, beheaded her, and carried her severed head out into the street.

The attack began at around 10:20 am when the man suddenly started stabbing Mills-Westley without warning and with a large knife, possibly a ceremonial samurai sword. He then cut off her head, and carried it out into the street while shouting: "This is my treasure," and "God is on earth." The man threw the head to the ground and was tackled by a security guard before police arrived.

== Suspect ==
Police later named the suspect as 28-year-old unemployed Bulgarian Deyan Valentinov Deyanov, who suffered from paranoid schizophrenia. He was reported to have lived rough in a semi-derelict beach house and had a police record for violence towards strangers in the street. Three months prior to the attack on Mills-Westley, he had been released from a psychiatric unit at the Hospital de la Candelaria after a short stay following an unprovoked attack on a security guard who had been patrolling the seafront at Los Cristianos.

Two days prior to killing Mills-Westley, he was briefly detained by police for harassing women at a nightclub in nearby Playa de las Américas.

Although officials were initially quoted as saying the attack was random, later reports in the British media suggested that Mills-Westley had sought help in a nearby office just before she was murdered, telling staff that she feared she was being followed by a man who was then told to go away by a security guard.

In the years prior to the attack in Los Cristianos, Deyanov was understood to have travelled between Edinburgh and Bradford in the UK, Cyprus and Tenerife, and Flint in north Wales where he had relatives. He had not returned to his family in Ruse, Bulgaria, since stealing family money and possessions to pay for addictions to heroin and gambling. In the summer of 2010 he spent some time in a psychiatric unit at Glan Clwyd Hospital in Bodelwyddan, northeast Wales.

=== Trial ===
Deyanov was detained at a psychiatric unit and charged with murder.

His trial at the provincial court in Santa Cruz began on 18 February 2013 when a court was shown CCTV footage of the attack. Deyanov denied murder, claiming insanity. The trial lasted one week and on 22 February 2013 he was found guilty. He was subsequently sentenced to detention in a psychiatric unit for 20 years, the maximum applicable term.

Speaking after the conviction, Mills-Westley's daughters said in a joint statement that their mother had "become known as the lady who was beheaded in Tenerife, but the truth is she was our mum, mentor and best friend, a highly gifted and selfless person." They described her murder as "preventable and needless" and said there had been a "catalogue of failings" in relation to the handling of Deyanov as a mentally unstable man.
