= Atiscross =

Former hundred of Cheshire

Atiscross or Ati's Cross was one of the original twelve Hundreds of Cheshire bordering the Welsh Kingdom of Gwynedd to the west. It appears in the Domesday Book in 1066 under the control of Earl Edwin. There were 87 settlements within the Hundred, several of the largest and most valuable (to the Lord) included:

- Dodleston - 25 households, £2, woodland (1 league)
- Claverton - 21 households, £2, meadow (3 acres), 1 salthouse.
- Hawarden - 14 households - £3, meadow (0.5 acres), 1 church (0.5 acres of church lands), woodland (2 x 1 league).
- Broughton - 10 households - £1.5, ploughland (0.5 acres).
- Aston - 7 households, £1, ploughland (1 acre).
- Wepre - 6 households, £1, ploughland (1 acre), woodland (0.5 leagues).

Atiscross later became a principal part of Flintshire during the reign of Edward I.

Early Ordnance Survey maps show the "Supposed site" of Ati's Cross (from which the Hundred derives its name) a little inland from Pentre Ffwrndan, adjacent to Croes-Ati (or Groes-ati) Mill, at (OS GR) SJ 252730. Croes Ati Lane (and a continuing footpath) at the (modern) edge of Flint town leads to it.

It later gave its name to Ysgol Croes Atti, a Welsh-medium primary school based in two sites in Flint and Shotton.
