= Llangollen Community Hospital =

- Betsi Cadwaladr University Health Board
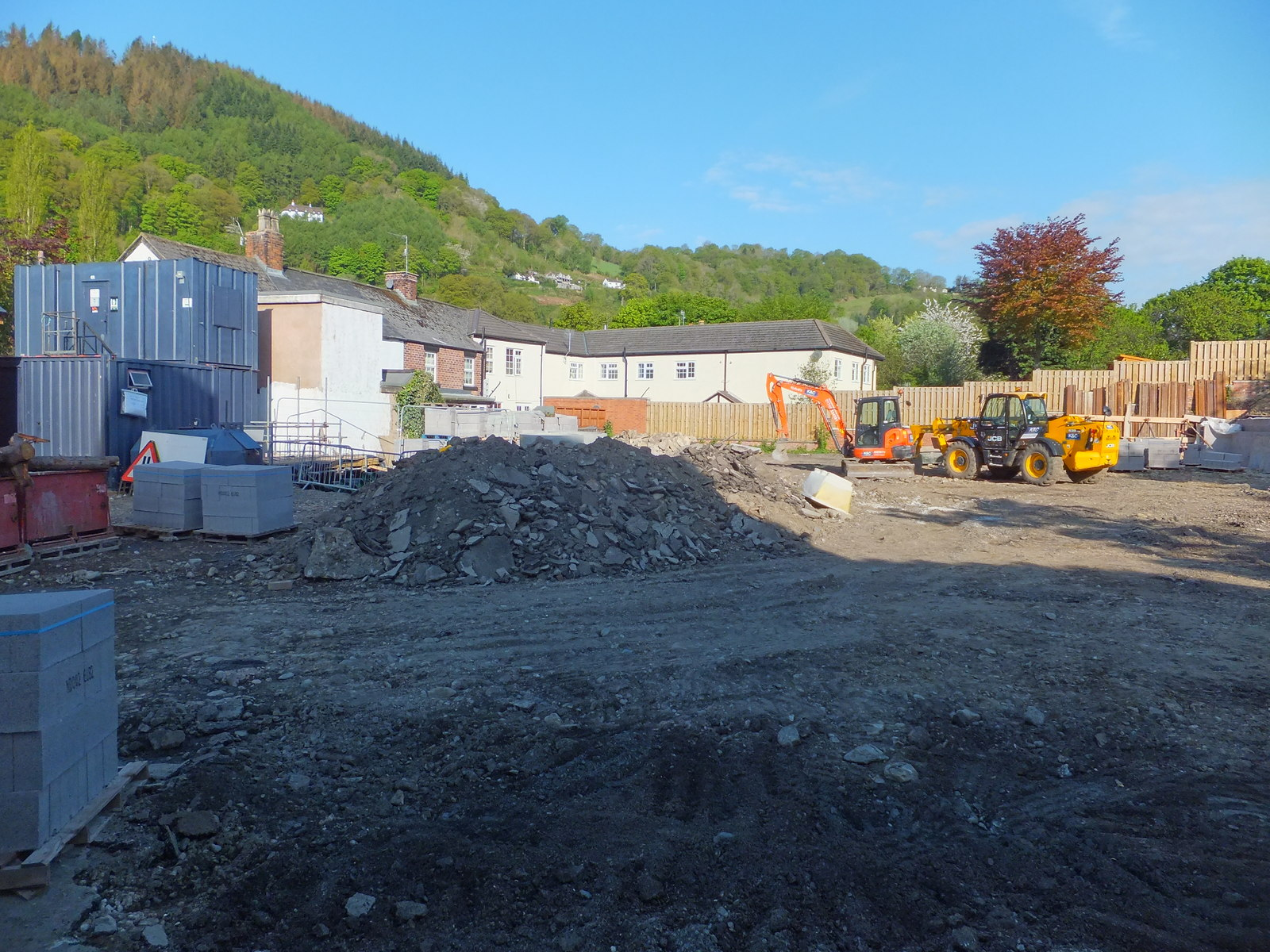
- Redevelopment of the old hospital site

- Shown in Denbighshire

Geography
- Location: Llangollen, Denbighshire, Wales
- Coordinates: 52.9728°N 3.1761°W

Organisation
- Care system: Local authority and private subscription to 1948; NHS from 1948
- Type: Community hospital

History
- Founded: 1876
- Closed: 2013

Links
- Lists: Hospitals in Wales

Llangollen Community Hospital (Welsh: Ysbyty Cymunedol Llangollen) was a community hospital in Llangollen, Wales. It was managed by Betsi Cadwaladr University Health Board.

== History ==
The hospital was completed in April 1876 and was extended in 1884. Soldiers suffering from gas, gangrene and gunshot wounds were treated in the hospital during the First World War. It joined the National Health Service in 1948 and it was extended to include physiotherapy and out-patient departments in 1958. It became a community hospital in the 1980s. After the hospital closed in March 2013, the building was demolished and the site was redeveloped for residential use in 2016.
