= Royal Alexandra Hospital, Rhyl =

Hospital in Denbighshire, Wales

Royal Alexandra Hospital
- Betsi Cadwaladr University Health Board
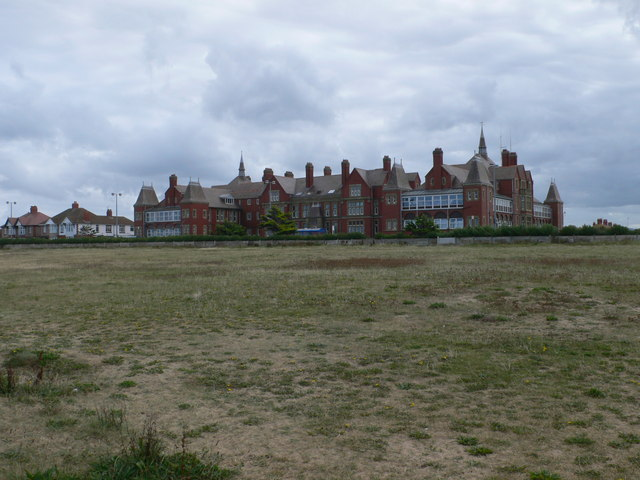
- Royal Alexandra Hospital

- Shown in Denbighshire

Geography
- Location: Rhyl, Denbighshire, Wales
- Coordinates: 53°19′35″N 3°28′50″W

Organisation
- Care system: Local authority and private subscription to 1948; NHS from 1948
- Type: Specialist

Services
- Speciality: Geriatric services

History
- Founded: 1872

Links
- Lists: Hospitals in Wales

The Royal Alexandra Hospital (Welsh: Ysbyty Frenhinol Alexandra, RAH) is a community hospital in Rhyl, Denbighshire, Wales. It is managed by the Betsi Cadwaladr University Health Board. The hospital is a Grade II listed building. It has no in-patient facilities but is used for a range of outpatient services including physiotherapy, X-ray and CAMHS.

== History ==
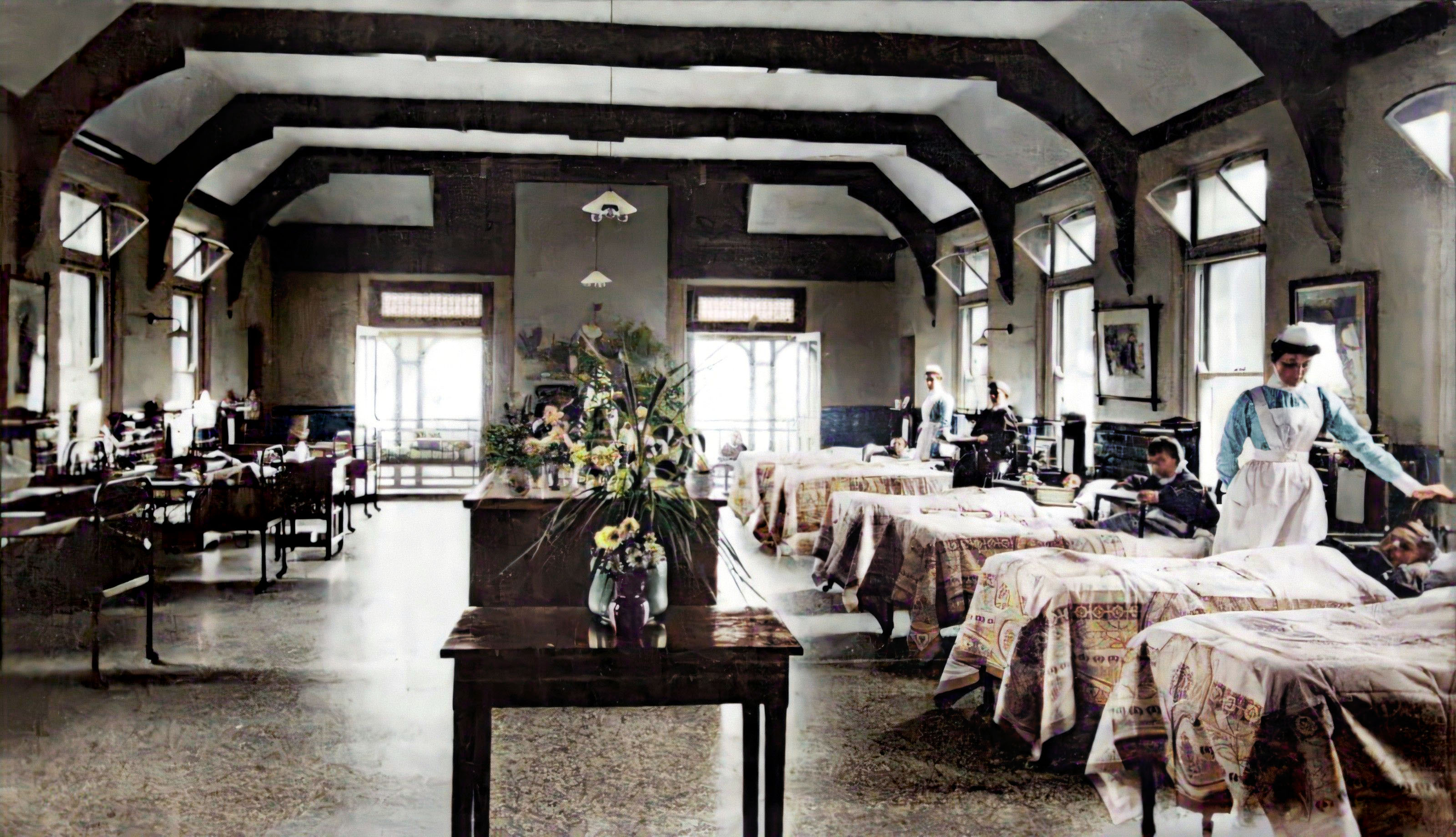
Gertrude Ffoulkes Ward, Royal Alexandra Hospital, Rhyl - Coloured (c.1915).

The hospital has its origins in a convalescent home for sick and needy children established on East Parade in 1872. It moved to the Baths building in 1873 and was renamed the Royal Alexandra Hospital in 1882. Piecemeal expansions occurred until the site for the present building was purchased.

The present building was designed by Alfred Waterhouse, perhaps with later input from his son, Paul, as a children's hospital and convalescent home. The hospital design, which was based on a pavilion incorporating open balconies and verandahs, responded to the importance then attached to fresh air as a treatment. Funding came from voluntary subscription, the town council and the Duke of Westminster. Construction started in 1899 and it was officially opened through a ceremony, first by Winifred, Countess of Dundonald in 1900 and later by Prince George and Princess Mary in 1902. An additional east wing was added to the original central and west wings between 1908 and 1910.

During Winifred, Countess of Dundonald's opening in 1900, the names of the wards, which were announced as brief services in each of the rooms by Rev. Thomas Lloyd, (Rhyl's Vicar at that time). The larger wards were 'The Gertrude Ffoulkes Ward' (In memory of the only child of the late archdeacon.), 'The Hesketh Ward' (Named in memory of Winifred's father; Robert Bamford Hesketh) and 'The Duke's ward' (Named in memory of the late Duke of Westminster). The smaller wards were 'The Price Roberts Ward' (In remembrance of Dr. Price Roberts, the very first physician who worked at the building) and 'The Graham Ward', there is also an 'Edith Vizard ward'.

After acute services transferred to Glan Clwyd Hospital, the Royal Alexandra Hospital became a specialist geriatric facility in 1980. Inpatient services were discontinued in 2009. In May 2020 Betsi Cadwaladr University Health Board released plans for a new community hospital as part of a wider refurbishment programme.
