= Aston, Flintshire =

Village in Flintshire, Wales

Coordinates: 53.198°N 3.040°W

Aston
- Around Aston Park, there is much countryside as well as industry

- Location within Flintshire
- Area: 0.8368 km^{2} (0.3231 sq mi)
- Population: 2,850 (2021 census)
  - Density: 3,406/km^{2} (8,820/sq mi)
- OS grid reference: SJ304674
- Community: Hawarden
- Principal area: Flintshire
- Preserved county: Clwyd
- Country: Wales
- Sovereign state: United Kingdom
- Post town: DEESIDE
- Postcode district: CH5
- Dialling code: 01244
- Police: North Wales
- Fire: North Wales
- Ambulance: Welsh
- UK Parliament: Alyn and Deeside
- Senedd Cymru – Welsh Parliament: Alyn and Deeside

Aston, also known as Aston Park, is a village in the community of Hawarden, in the principal area of Flintshire, north Wales. It is near to Hawarden and Shotton, in a relatively urban area, though there remains significant amount of countryside— Wepre Park is only a short distance away. In 2021, the wider built-up area had a population of 2,850.

The Domesday Book lists Aston as a settlement in the Atiscross hundred of Cheshire. The former manor house, now used as a retirement home, is a Grade II* listed building.. An Anglican church was built in 1938 near Old Aston Hill for the use of people in Aston and Ewloe.

The area has several amenities, including shops, a hairdresser, an Indian takeaway, a bowling green, a park, a primary school, a pub and Deeside Community Hospital.

Aston Park Rangers is the local football team. They play in division one of the North East Wales Football League.

The A494 passes through Aston as a dual carriageway. The Welsh Assembly Government bought up and demolished 43 homes on the Aston Mead estate as part of a 2006 proposal to widen the road. The widening proposal was rejected by a public inquiry held in 2007 and then withdrawn. In 2016, 21 homes were built on the site.
