= Ysbyty Penrhos Stanley =

- Betsi Cadwaladr University Health Board
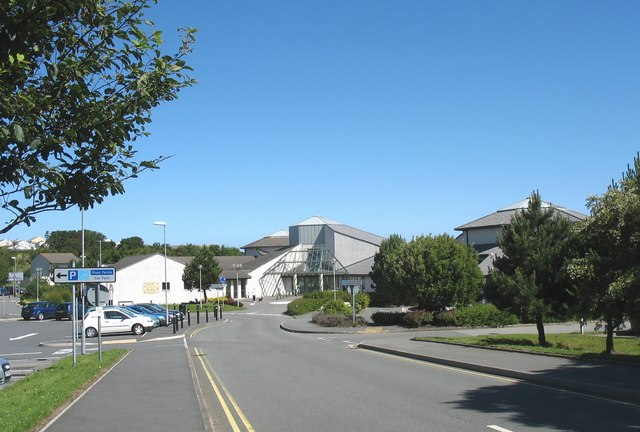
- Ysbyty Penrhos Stanley

- Shown in Anglesey

Geography
- Location: Holyhead, Anglesey, Wales
- Coordinates: 53.3042°N 4.6158°W

Organisation
- Care system: NHS Wales
- Type: Community

History
- Founded: 1852

Links
- Lists: Hospitals in Wales

Ysbyty Penrhos Stanley (English: Penrhos Stanley Hospital) is a health facility in Holyhead, Anglesey, Wales. It is managed by the Betsi Cadwaladr University Health Board.

== History ==
The facility has its origins in the Holyhead Workhouse Infirmary at Black Bridge on the north-west part of Salt Island which opened in 1852. This became the Valley Public Assistance Institution in 1930 and joined the National Health Service as Valley Hospital in 1948. Patients were transferred from Stanley Sailors' Hospital when it closed in 1987. The current facility was built on Penrhos Beach Road on the south-east part of Salt Island, just under a mile from the old hospital, and opened as Ysbyty Penrhos Stanley in 1996. A four-bed hospice unit was created in an unused ward within the hospital in 2019.
