= Holywell Community Hospital =

- Betsi Cadwaladr University Health Board
- Shown in Flintshire

Geography
- Location: Halkyn Road, Holywell, Flintshire, Wales, United Kingdom
- Coordinates: 53.2694°N 3.2166°W

Organisation
- Care system: NHS Wales
- Type: Community Hospital

Services
- Beds: 44

History
- Founded: 2008

Links
- Website: bcuhb.nhs.wales/patients-and-visitors/hospitals-and-health-centres/holywell-community-hospital/
- Lists: Hospitals in Wales

Holywell Community Hospital (Welsh: Ysbyty Cymuned Treffynnon) is a community hospital in Halkyn Road, Holywell, Flintshire, Wales. It is managed by the Betsi Cadwaladr University Health Board.

== History ==
The hospital was commissioned to replace the old Holywell Cottage Hospital, which had been established in Pen-Y-Maes Road in 1909, as well as the old Lluesty Hospital, which had been established on the Old Chester Road in 1840 and Holywell Clinic on Park Lane, which opened more recently. The new facility, which was designed by TACP Architects and built at a cost of £8.3 million, opened in March 2008.
