= H.M. Stanley Hospital =

Former hospital in Denbighshire, Wales

- Betsi Cadwaladr University Health Board
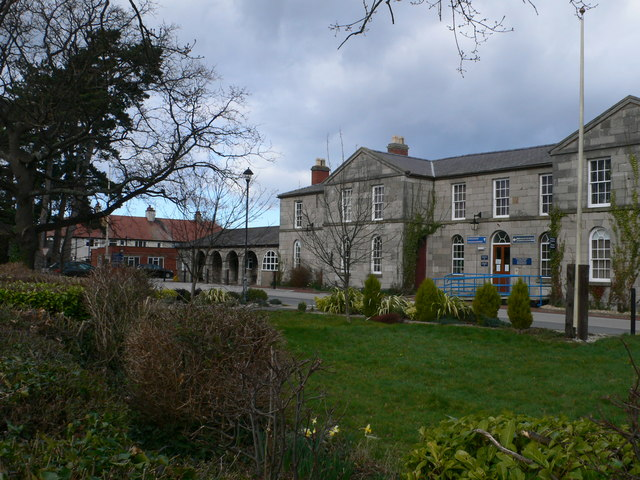
- H.M. Stanley Hospital

- Shown in Denbighshire

Geography
- Location: St Asaph, Denbighshire, Wales
- Coordinates: 53.2521°N 3.4351°W

Organisation
- Care system: Local authority and private subscription to 1948; NHS from 1948
- Type: Community hospital

History
- Founded: 1839
- Closed: 2012

Links
- Lists: Hospitals in Wales

H.M. Stanley Hospital (Welsh: Ysbyty H.M. Stanley) was a community hospital in St Asaph, Wales. It was managed by the Betsi Cadwaladr University Health Board. It served as the headquarters of the Welsh Ambulance Service until 2019.

== History ==
The hospital had its origins in the St. Asaph Union Workhouse which was designed by John Welch and completed in 1839. The workhouse became home to Henry Morton Stanley, who went on to become an adventurer and journalist, in 1847. A new infirmary was built in 1903. The workhouse became the St Asaph Public Assistance Institution in 1930 and it joined the National Health Service as the H.M. Stanley Hospital, named after its famous student, in 1948.

After the health board found that the hospital would need substantial refurbishment work to restore it to a status that was fit for purpose, services at the hospital were transferred to other hospitals, including a new eye unit at Abergele Hospital and it closed in April 2012. The site was the headquarters of the Welsh Ambulance Service until 2019, when the trust moved to St Asaph Business Park. In 2019, the building was in the process of being decommissioned and sold.
