= Llandudno General Hospital =

- Betsi Cadwaladr University Health Board
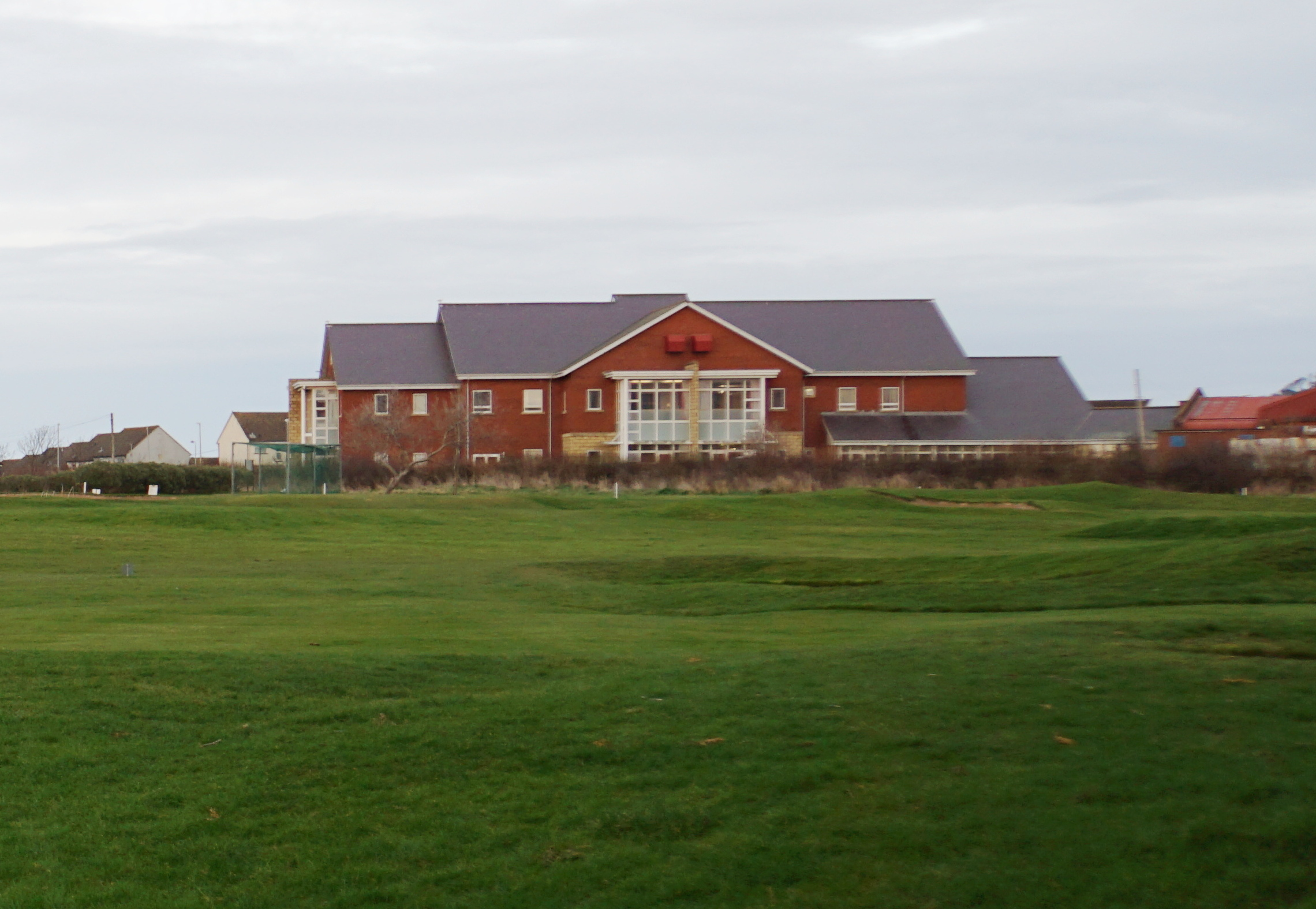
- Llandudno General Hospital

- Shown in Conwy County Borough

Geography
- Location: Llandudno, Conwy County Borough, Wales
- Coordinates: 53.3112°N 3.8281°W

Organisation
- Care system: Local authority and private subscription to 1948; NHS from 1948
- Type: General hospital

History
- Founded: 1939

Links
- Website: www.wales.nhs.uk/sitesplus/861/tudalen/42404
- Lists: Hospitals in Wales

Llandudno General Hospital (Welsh: Ysbyty Cyffredinol Llandudno) is a general hospital in Llandudno, Wales. It is managed by the Betsi Cadwaladr University Health Board.

== History ==
The hospital has its origins in the Llandudno Fever hospital which was built in the 1890s. The foundation stone for a new hospital to be built to the south of the fever hospital, was laid on 15 June 1938 and it was officially opened by Princess Alice, Countess of Athlone accompanied by the Earl of Athlone on 12 August 1939. A new osteoporosis and bone densitometry unit was opened by Dr Brian Gibbons, Health Minister in the Welsh Assembly Government, in December 2006.
