= Ruthin Community Hospital =

- Betsi Cadwaladr University Health Board
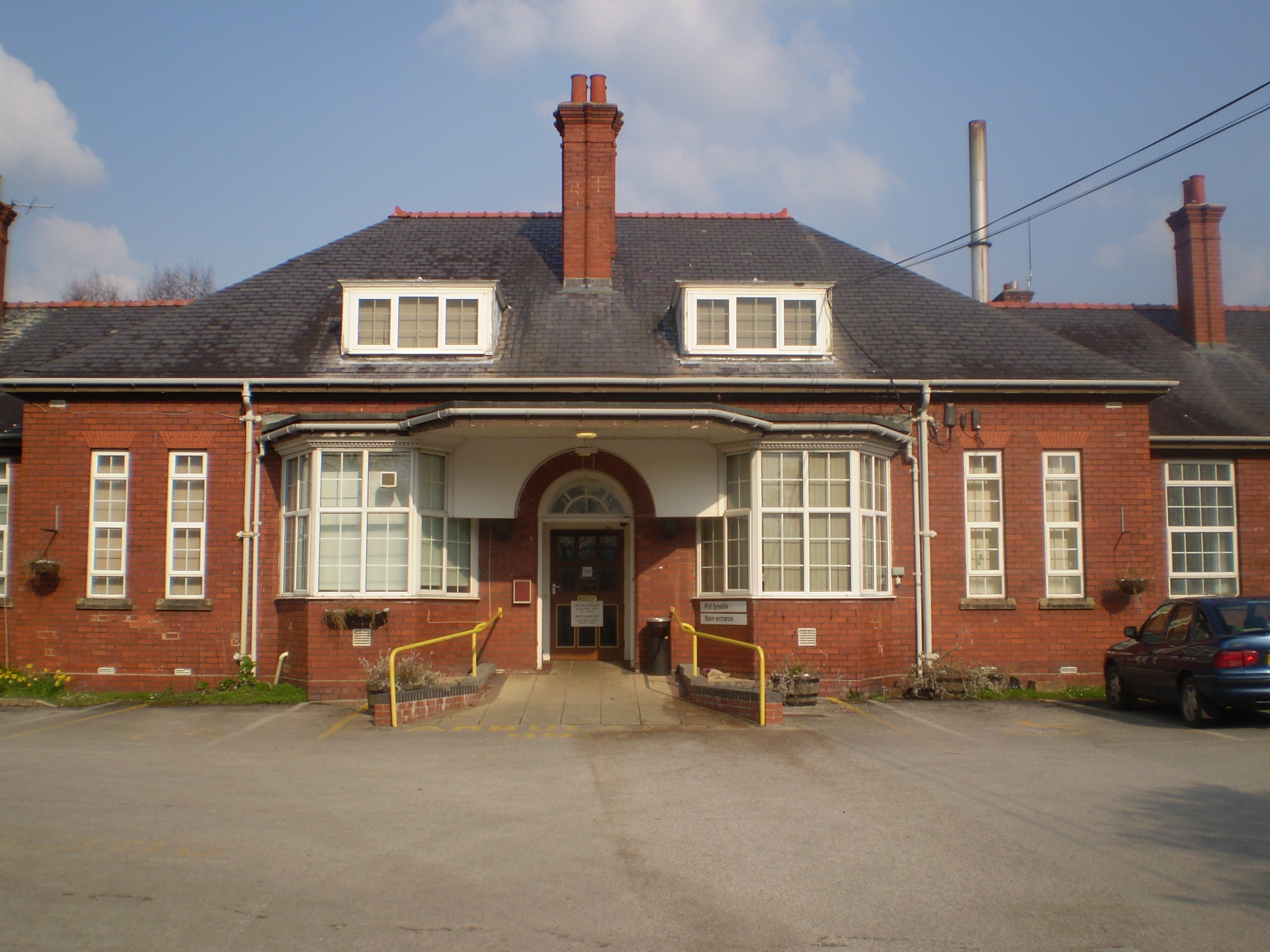
- Ruthin Community Hospital

- Shown in Denbighshire

Geography
- Location: Ruthin, Denbighshire, Wales
- Coordinates: 53.1130°N 3.3030°W

Organisation
- Care system: Local authority and private subscription to 1948; NHS from 1948
- Type: Community hospital

History
- Founded: 1914

Links
- Lists: Hospitals in Wales

Ruthin Community Hospital (Welsh: Ysbyty Cymunedol Rhuthun) is a community hospital in Ruthin, Wales. It is managed by Betsi Cadwaladr University Health Board.

== History ==
The hospital, which was designed as an infirmary for the Ruthin Union Workhouse, actually first saw use as convalescent home during the First World War. It became an acute general hospital in the 1930s, a hospital managed by GPs in the 1950s and a community hospital in the 1980s. In July 2012 the health board announced that the minor injuries unit would close and X-ray services would no longer be provided.
