= Deeside Community Hospital =

- Betsi Cadwaladr University Health Board
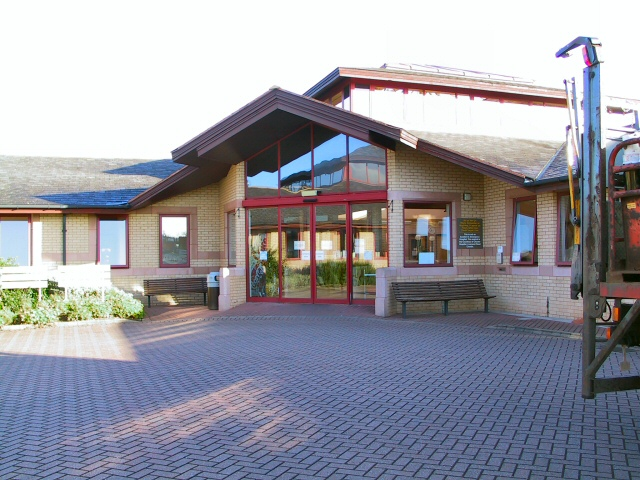
- Deeside Community Hospital

- Shown in Flintshire

Geography
- Location: Aston Park, Flintshire, Wales, United Kingdom
- Coordinates: 53.2023°N 3.0411°W

Organisation
- Care system: Public NHS
- Type: Community Hospital

Services
- Beds: 62

History
- Founded: 1992

Links
- Lists: Hospitals in Wales

Deeside Community Hospital (Welsh: Ysbyty Cymuned Glannau Dyfrdwy) is a community hospital in Aston Park, Flintshire, Wales. It is managed by the Betsi Cadwaladr University Health Board.

== History ==
The hospital, which was commissioned to replace the aging Mancot Royal Hospital, was opened by the Queen in 1992. A new rehabilitation unit for elderly people was completed in 2004. The health board were forced to close a ward in 2014 due to staff shortages. Lord Barry Jones opened a new suite of "dementia friendly" facilities in July 2017.
