= Chirk Community Hospital =

- Betsi Cadwaladr University Health Board
- Shown in Wrexham County Borough

Geography
- Location: Chirk, Wales, United Kingdom
- Coordinates: 52.9436°N 3.0546°W

Organisation
- Care system: Public NHS
- Type: Community hospital

Services
- Beds: 31

History
- Founded: 1990

Links
- Lists: Hospitals in Wales

Chirk Community Hospital (Welsh: Ysbyty Cymuned Y Waun) is a community hospital in Chirk, Wales. It is managed by the Betsi Cadwaladr University Health Board.

== History ==
The hospital has its origins in the Chirk and District Cottage Hospital which was financed by local miners and opened in 1921. It joined the National Health Service in 1948 and became the Chirk and District Hospital in 1955. It was rebuilt on the same site and reopened as the Chirk Community Hospital in 1990.
