= Abergele Hospital =

- Betsi Cadwaladr University Health Board
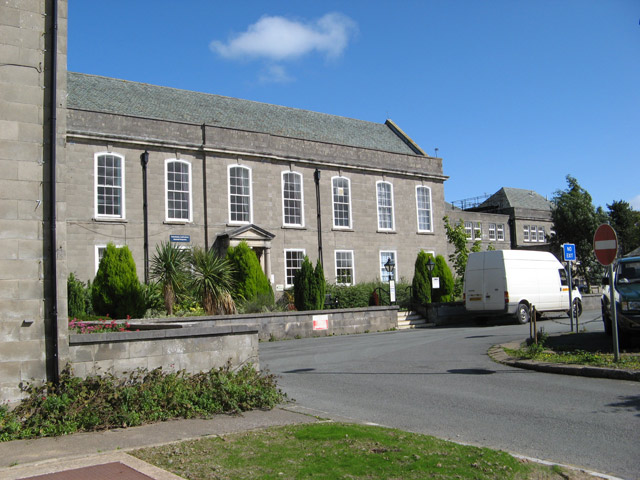
- Abergele Hospital

- Shown in Conwy County Borough

Geography
- Location: Abergele, Conwy County Borough, Wales
- Coordinates: 53.2664°N 3.5810°W

Organisation
- Care system: Local authority and private subscription to 1948; NHS from 1948
- Type: Community hospital

History
- Founded: 1910

Links
- Website: www.wales.nhs.uk/sitesplus/861/page/42921
- Lists: Hospitals in Wales

Abergele Hospital (Welsh: Ysbyty Abergele) is a community hospital in Abergele, Wales. It is managed by Betsi Cadwaladr University Health Board.

== History ==
The facility was established by Manchester City Council to treat children suffering from tuberculosis in 1910. Originally known as Plas Ucha Sanatorium, expansion took place after a new access bridge was completed in 1925 with a new children's section opening in 1931. It joined the National Health Service in 1948 and was renamed the Abergele Chest Hospital in 1955. It became a community hospital in the 1980s and expanded further when ophthalmology services transferred from the H.M. Stanley Hospital in St Asaph in 2011.

== Services ==
The hospital services include the Stanley Eye Unit, North Wales Adolescent Service, Orthopaedics, as well as provisions for corporate functions. There are no walk in casualty services on site.
