= Ysbyty Alltwen =

- Betsi Cadwaladr University Health Board
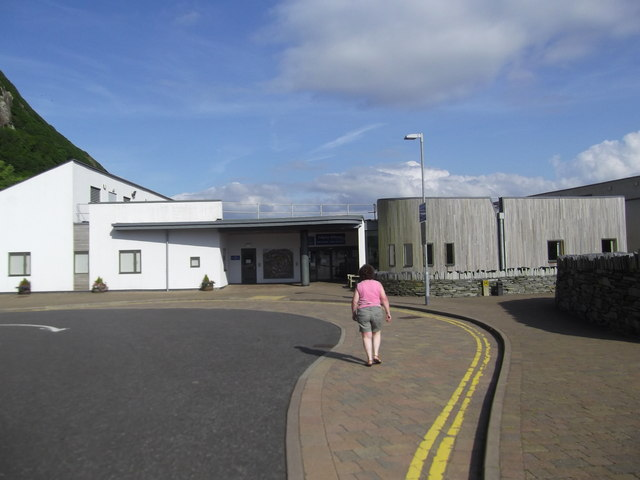
- Ysbyty Alltwen

- Shown in Gwynedd

Geography
- Location: Tremadog, Gwynedd, Wales
- Coordinates: 52.9408°N 4.1496°W

Organisation
- Care system: NHS Wales
- Type: General

History
- Founded: 2009

Links
- Lists: Hospitals in Wales

Ysbyty Alltwen (English: Alltwen Hospital) is a health facility in Tremadog, Gwynedd, Wales. It is managed by the Betsi Cadwaladr University Health Board.

== History ==
The facility was commissioned to replace the aging Ysbyty Bron y Garth in Penrhyndeudraeth. It was designed by IBI Group and built on an elevated site which had previously been occupied by a rail interchange and ironstone mine. It cost £19 million to construct and was officially opened by Edwina Hart, Minister for Health and Social Services, in July 2009.
