= Denbigh Community Hospital =

- Betsi Cadwaladr University Health Board
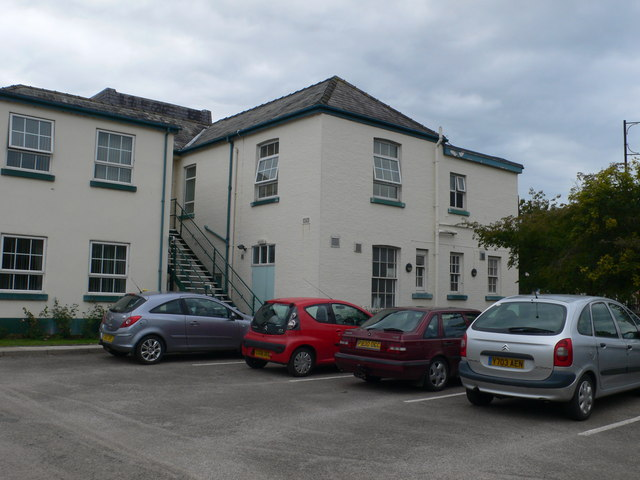
- Denbigh Community Hospital

- Shown in Denbighshire

Geography
- Location: Denbigh, Denbighshire, Wales
- Coordinates: 53.1859°N 3.4089°W

Organisation
- Care system: Local authority and private subscription to 1948; NHS from 1948
- Type: Community hospital

History
- Founded: 1807

Links
- Website: www.wales.nhs.uk/sitesplus/861/page/42923
- Lists: Hospitals in Wales

Denbigh Community Hospital (Welsh: Ysbyty Cymunedol Dinbych) is a community hospital in Denbigh, Wales. It is managed by the Betsi Cadwaladr University Health Board.

== History ==
The hospital has its origins in the Denbighshire Dispensary which became the first voluntary hospital in Wales when it was established in Park Street in 1807. A purpose-built facility, which was designed by Thomas Harrison, was built in Park Street between 1810 and 1813. It started admitting inpatients and became the Denbighshire Infirmary and General Dispensary from March 1826.

It joined the National Health Service in 1948 and became a community hospital in the 1980s. The Princess Royal visited the hospital to celebrate its bi-centenary in October 2007.

== Sources ==
- Champness, John (2005), Thomas Harrison, Georgian Architect of Chester and Lancaster, 1744–1829, Lancaster: Centre for North-West Regional Studies, Lancaster University, ISBN 1-86220-169-2
