= Mold Community Hospital =

- Betsi Cadwaladr University Health Board
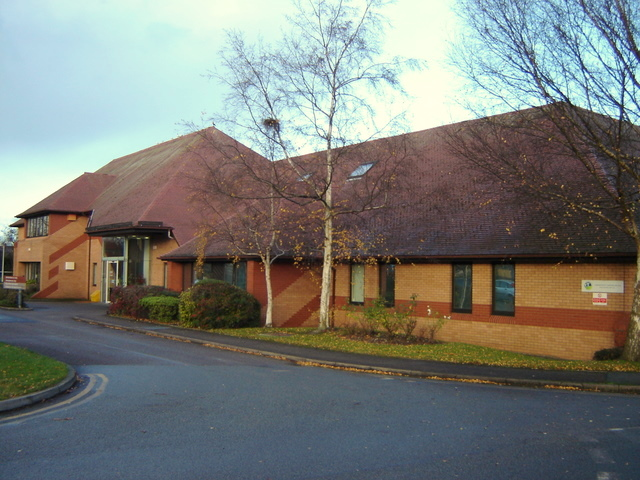
- Mold Community Hospital

- Shown in Flintshire

Geography
- Location: Mold, Flintshire, Wales, United Kingdom
- Coordinates: 53.1698°N 3.1481°W

Organisation
- Care system: Public NHS
- Type: Community Hospital

Services
- Beds: 40

History
- Founded: 1877

Links
- Lists: Hospitals in Wales

Mold Community Hospital (Welsh: Ysbyty Cymuned yr Wyddgrug) is a community hospital in Mold, Flintshire, Wales. It is managed by the Betsi Cadwaladr University Health Board.

== History ==
The hospital has its origins in the old Mold Cottage Hospital in 1877. The current modern facility, which was built just to the west of the old hospital, opened in 1985. The architects of the Welsh Health Common Services Authority won the Gold Medal for Architecture at the National Eisteddfod of Wales of 1986 for their work on the new Mold Community Hospital. Two wards in the new hospital were refurbished in 2017.
