= Colwyn Bay Community Hospital =

Community hospital in Conwy, Wales

- Betsi Cadwaladr University Health Board
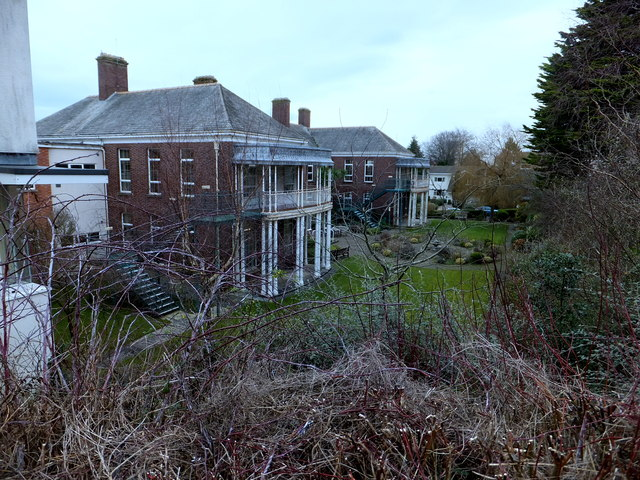
- Colwyn Bay Community Hospital

- Shown in Conwy County Borough

Geography
- Location: Colwyn Bay, Conwy County Borough, Wales, United Kingdom
- Coordinates: 53.2879°N 3.7104°W

Organisation
- Care system: Public NHS
- Type: Community hospital

History
- Founded: 1899

Links
- Lists: Hospitals in Wales

Colwyn Bay Community Hospital (Welsh: Ysbyty Cymuned Bae Colwyn) is a community hospital in Colwyn Bay, Wales. It is managed by the Betsi Cadwaladr University Health Board.

== History ==
The hospital has its origins in the Colwyn Bay Jubilee Cottage Hospital which was established in 1899 which was built on land donated by Winifred, Countess of Dundonald.

On 14 December 1910, Winifred, Countess of Dundonald was invited to open a new operating theatre.

The present hospital, which was designed by Sidney Colwyn Foulkes and incorporated the latest concepts from the United States, opened as the Colwyn Bay and West Denbighshire Hospital in 1925. It joined the National Health Service in 1948 and became a community hospital in the 1980s.
