= Llanfairfechan =

Town and community in Conwy, Wales

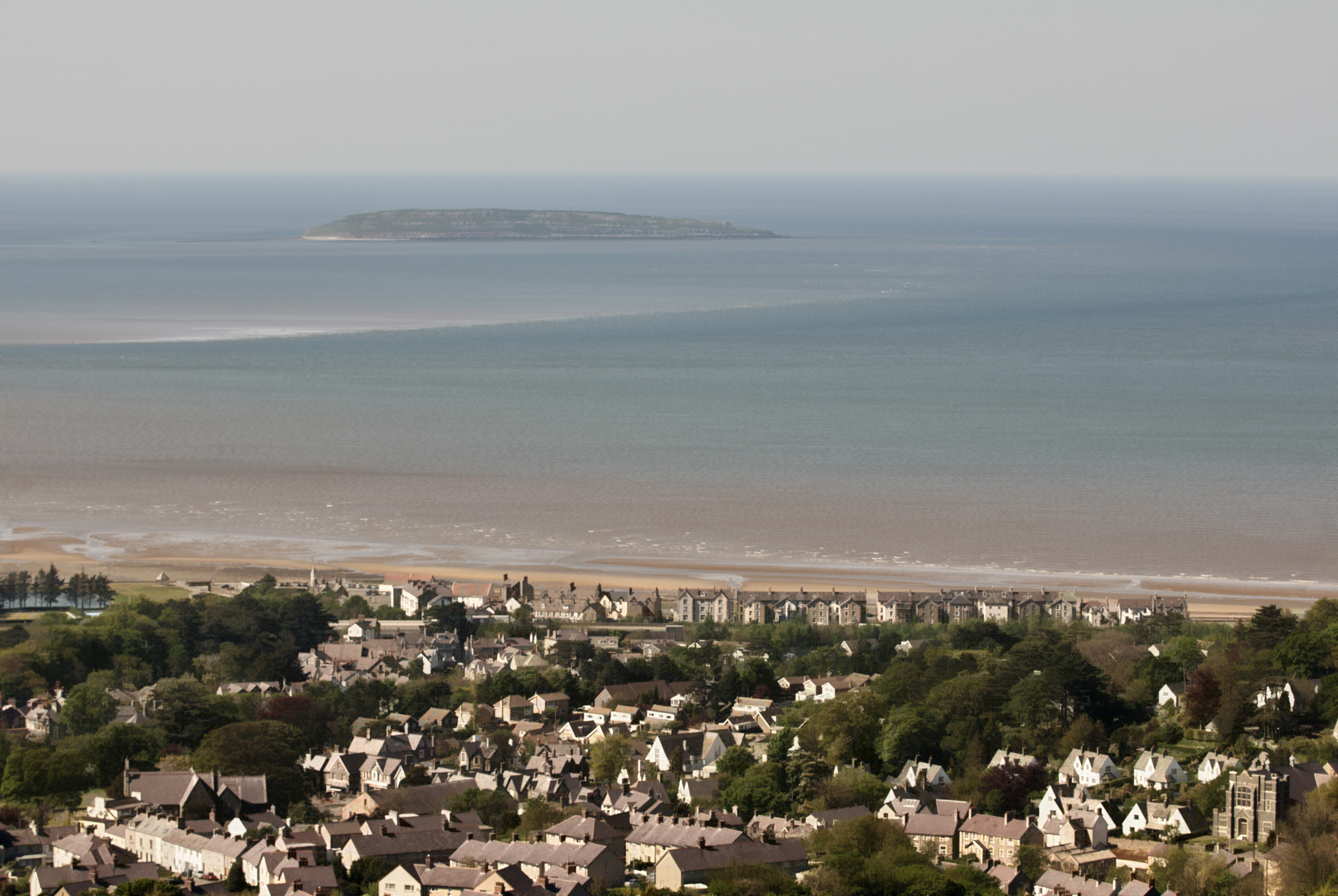
- A view over Llanfairfechan

- Location within Conwy
- Population: 3,637 (2011)
- OS grid reference: SH683747
- Community: Llanfairfechan
- Principal area: Conwy
- Preserved county: Clwyd
- Country: Wales
- Sovereign state: United Kingdom
- Post town: LLANFAIRFECHAN
- Postcode district: LL33
- Dialling code: 01248
- Police: North Wales
- Fire: North Wales
- Ambulance: Welsh
- UK Parliament: Bangor Aberconwy
- Senedd Cymru – Welsh Parliament: Bangor Conwy Môn
- List of places UK Wales Conwy 53.253°N 3.973°W Map of the community

Llanfairfechan (Welsh for 'little St Mary's parish'; Welsh pronunciation) is a town and community in the Conwy County Borough, Wales. It is known as a seaside resort and had a population at the 2001 Census of 3,755, reducing to 3,637 at the 2011 Census. The history of the area dates back to at least Roman times, as demonstrated by the discovery of a large second century milestone, which is now preserved in the British Museum.

== History ==
There are a number of prehistoric sites on the hills above the village. The most important of these today is the old hillfort of Dinas; but the large defensive fortress of Braich-y-Dinas, at the summit of Penmaenmawr, was among the largest in Britain and Ireland until it was finally destroyed by quarrying at the start of the 20th century.

As in the case of Penmaenmawr, the present town grew up as a granite quarrying town and a seaside town from the mid-19th century onwards. At one time there were hundreds of men working in the Penmaenmawr quarry, but today quarrying has stopped completely on this side of the mountain.

Heidelberg Materials Aggregates Penmaenmawr currently employs about ten people at the quarry.

== Governance ==
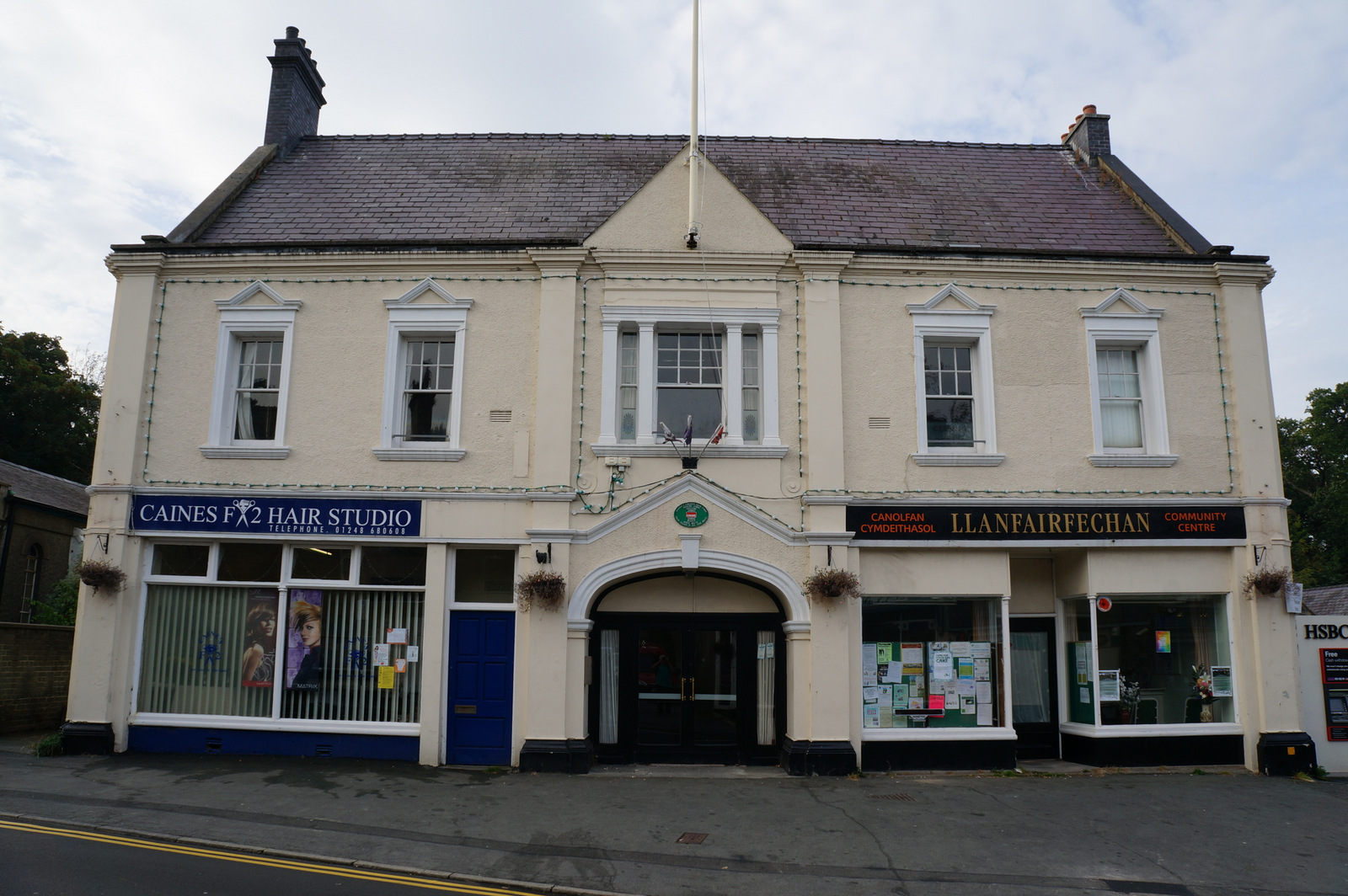
Town Hall, Village Road

There are two tiers of local government covering Llanfairfechan, at community (town) level and principal area (county borough) level: Llanfairfechan Town Council (Cyngor Tref Llanfairfechan) and Conwy County Borough Council. The town council is based at the Town Hall on Village Road.

=== Administrative history ===
Llanfairfechan was an ancient parish within the historic county of Caernarfonshire. In 1872 the parish was made a local government district, administered by an elected local board.

Such local government districts were reconstituted as urban districts under the Local Government Act 1894. Llanfairfechan Urban District was abolished in 1974, with its area becoming a community in the Aberconwy borough of the new county of Gwynedd. Further reforms in 1996 abolished the boroughs and counties created in 1974, and Llanfairfechan was placed in the new Conwy County Borough. For the ceremonial purposes of lieutenancy and shrievalty, Llanfairfechan remained in the preserved county of Gwynedd until 2003, when the whole of Conwy County Borough was placed in the preserved county of Clwyd.

== Transport connections ==
The town lies on the north coast on the route of the A55 road, between Penmaenmawr and Bangor. It has a railway station on the North Wales Coast Line. It, however, is in the unusual situation where there is only one public road that connects it with the remainder of the British road network, which is the A55 road North Wales Expressway.

== Notable sites ==
Morfa Madryn, the salt marsh area immediately west of the town on the shore of Traeth Lafan, is a local authority-managed nature reserve of outstanding beauty and a favourite haunt of bird watchers. The site is home to cormorants and shags. The rare little egret can also be spotted. It is also not far from Aber Falls.

Llanfairfechan is also home to Bryn y Neuadd Hospital, a learning disability facility, a mental health unit (Carreg Fawr) and a medium-secure unit (Tŷ Llywelyn). The site, Bryn y Neuadd, is also home to the control centres for both the Emergency and Non-Emergency Ambulance services for the north.

Llanfairfechan was judged North Wales Calor Village of the Year for 2009 in the competition run by Calor Gas UK

The earlier Llanfairfechan Golf Club was founded in 1909. This club continued until the early 1950s. There is still a golf club operating in the town under the same name.

Wern Isaf (Rosebriars) is a house and garden designed by the architect Herbert Luck North. Born in Llanfairfechan, Luck North studied in London under Henry Wilson and Edwin Lutyens, before returning to build a substantial practice in Wales. His home is a Grade II listed building and its garden is listed, also at Grade II on the Cadw/ICOMOS Register of Parks and Gardens of Special Historic Interest in Wales.

== Welsh language ==
According to the 2011 Census, 45.3% of the population of the town can speak Welsh. 66.2% of the town's population who were born in Wales noted that they could speak the language.

The two schools situated in Llanfairfechan, Ysgol Pant-y-Rhedyn and Ysgol Babanod Llanfairfechan, are categorized as being predominantly English-medium schools but with significant use of Welsh.

== Town twinning ==
In 2011, the process of town-twinning between Llanfairfechan and Pleumeleuc was completed over the first weekend of June. A number of events were held over the weekend, including trips to local attractions and guided tours around Llanfairfechan itself.

== Climate ==
Climate data for Llanfairfechan (Aber No.2) (1991–2020) (extremes 1959-2002)
Month	Jan	Feb	Mar	Apr	May	Jun	Jul	Aug	Sep	Oct	Nov	Dec	Year
Record high °C (°F)	18.3 (64.9)	18.4 (65.1)	20.6 (69.1)	22.4 (72.3)	27.2 (81.0)	31.0 (87.8)	32.0 (89.6)	33.4 (92.1)	26.0 (78.8)	24.9 (76.8)	19.8 (67.6)	18.0 (64.4)	33.4 (92.1)
Mean daily maximum °C (°F)	9.2 (48.6)	9.2 (48.6)	10.6 (51.1)	12.6 (54.7)	15.4 (59.7)	17.9 (64.2)	19.6 (67.3)	19.5 (67.1)	17.7 (63.9)	14.8 (58.6)	11.8 (53.2)	9.7 (49.5)	14.0 (57.2)
Daily mean °C (°F)	6.5 (43.7)	6.3 (43.3)	7.6 (45.7)	9.3 (48.7)	12.0 (53.6)	14.5 (58.1)	16.2 (61.2)	16.3 (61.3)	14.5 (58.1)	11.9 (53.4)	9.1 (48.4)	6.9 (44.4)	11.0 (51.8)
Mean daily minimum °C (°F)	3.7 (38.7)	3.5 (38.3)	4.5 (40.1)	6.0 (42.8)	8.6 (47.5)	11.0 (51.8)	12.9 (55.2)	13.0 (55.4)	11.4 (52.5)	9.0 (48.2)	6.4 (43.5)	4.1 (39.4)	7.9 (46.2)
Record low °C (°F)	−7.1 (19.2)	−8.2 (17.2)	−5.0 (23.0)	−3.5 (25.7)	0.6 (33.1)	2.6 (36.7)	5.5 (41.9)	5.0 (41.0)	3.4 (38.1)	−0.3 (31.5)	−3.5 (25.7)	−6.1 (21.0)	−8.2 (17.2)
Average precipitation mm (inches)	115.7 (4.56)	89.5 (3.52)	81.0 (3.19)	59.4 (2.34)	62.8 (2.47)	71.3 (2.81)	60.7 (2.39)	84.7 (3.33)	93.7 (3.69)	118.3 (4.66)	137.4 (5.41)	140.1 (5.52)	1,114.7 (43.89)
Average precipitation days (≥ 1.0 mm)	15.3	12.9	12.4	11.5	10.9	10.0	11.5	12.3	12.7	14.7	17.7	16.7	158.5
Mean monthly sunshine hours	41.2	68.5	112.3	163.9	214.7	191.1	187.0	170.1	134.1	92.5	48.7	33.4	1,457.5
Source 1: Met Office
Source 2: Starlings Roost Weather

== Gallery ==
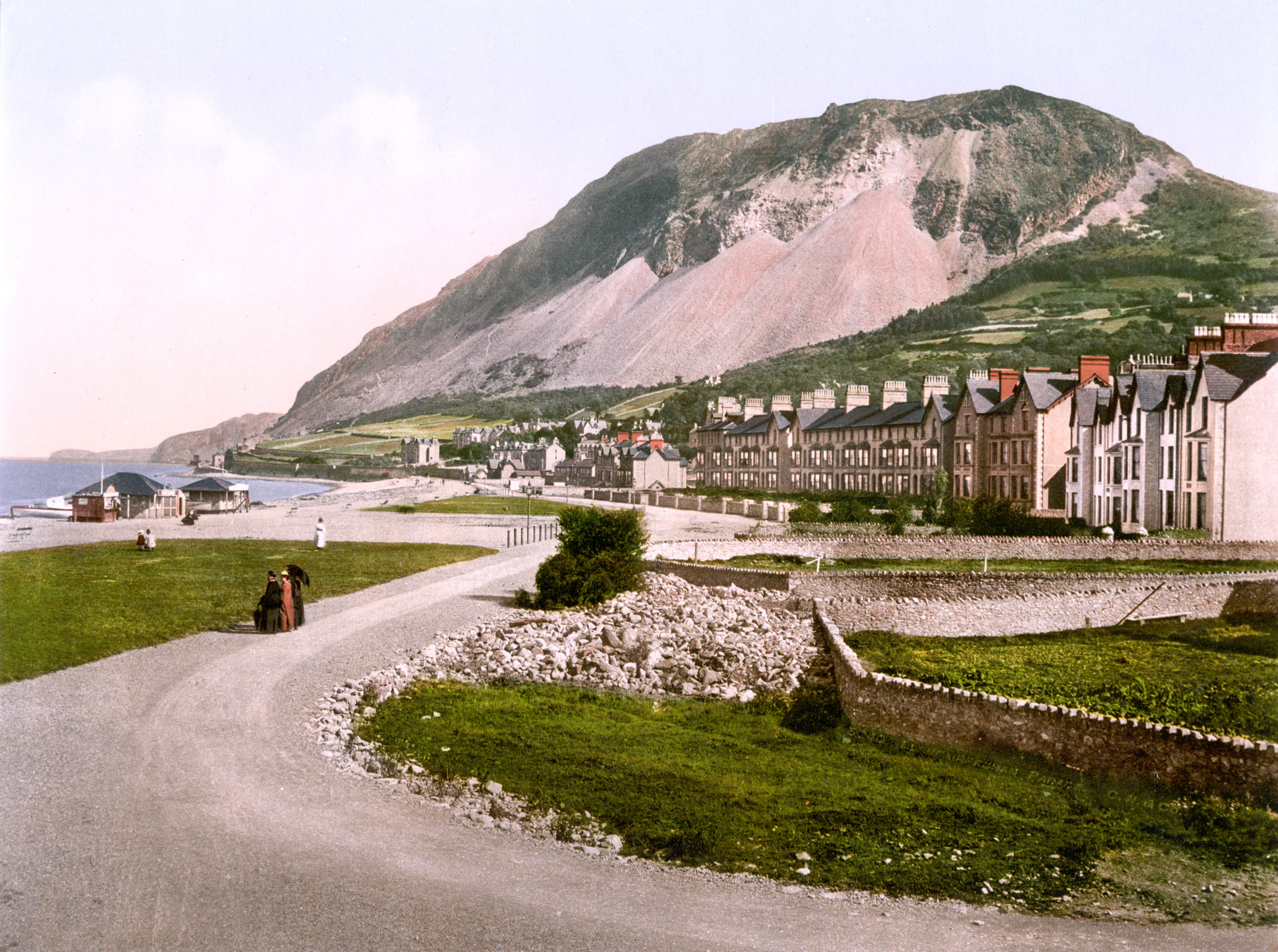
Colourised Photochrom print (circa the late 19th century) of seafront and Penmaenmawr mountain

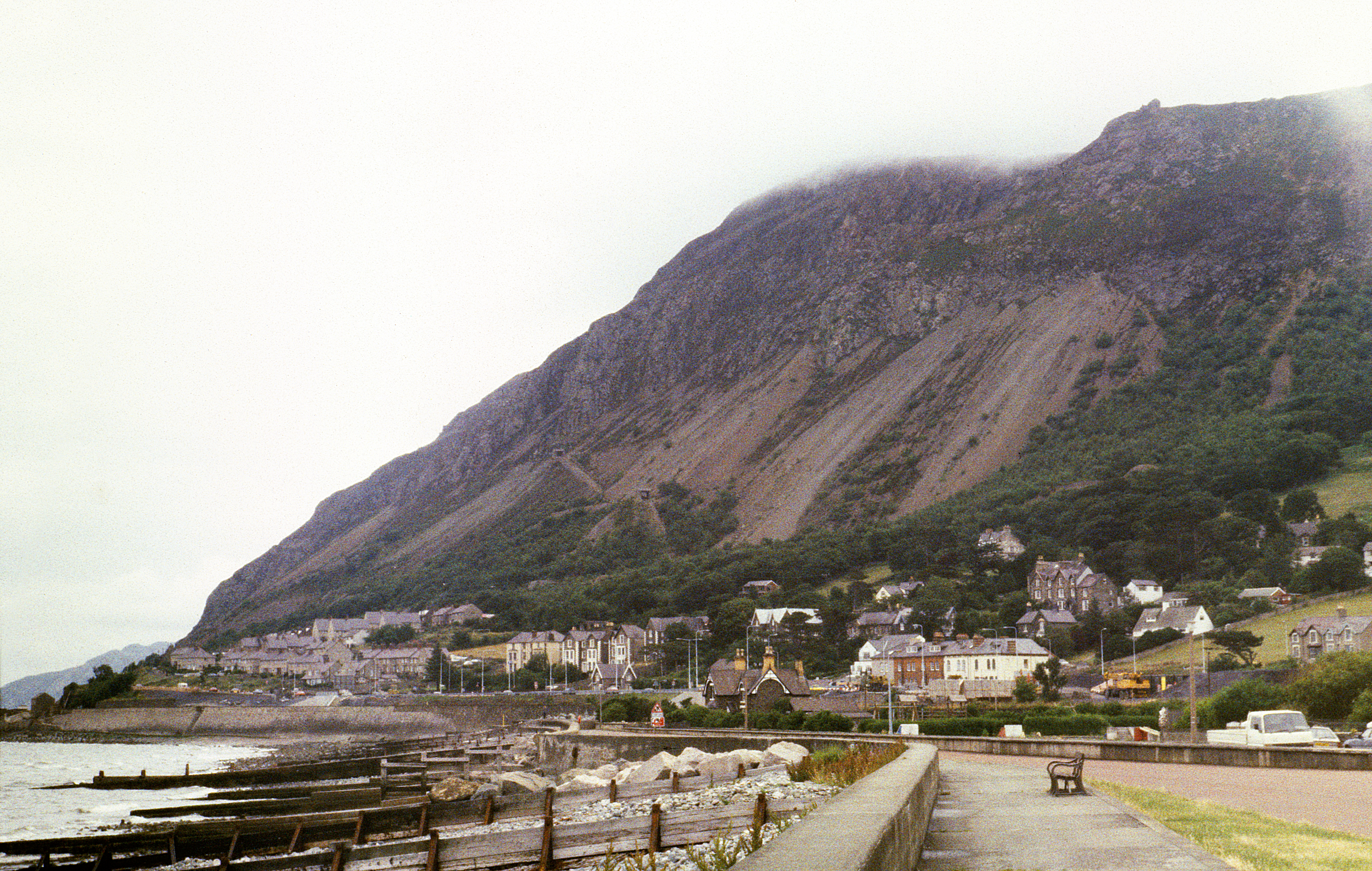
A similar view in 1989 during more overcast weather

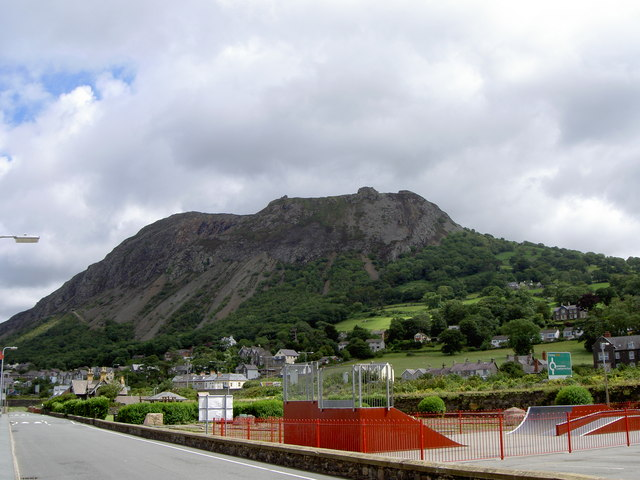
The town in 2007

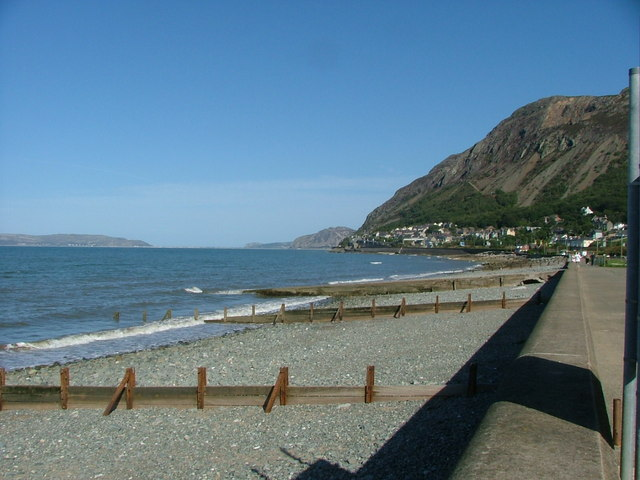
The beach

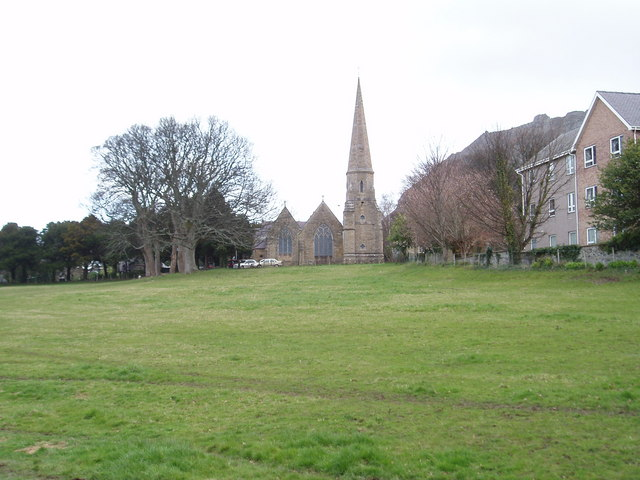
Christ Church (Church in Wales)

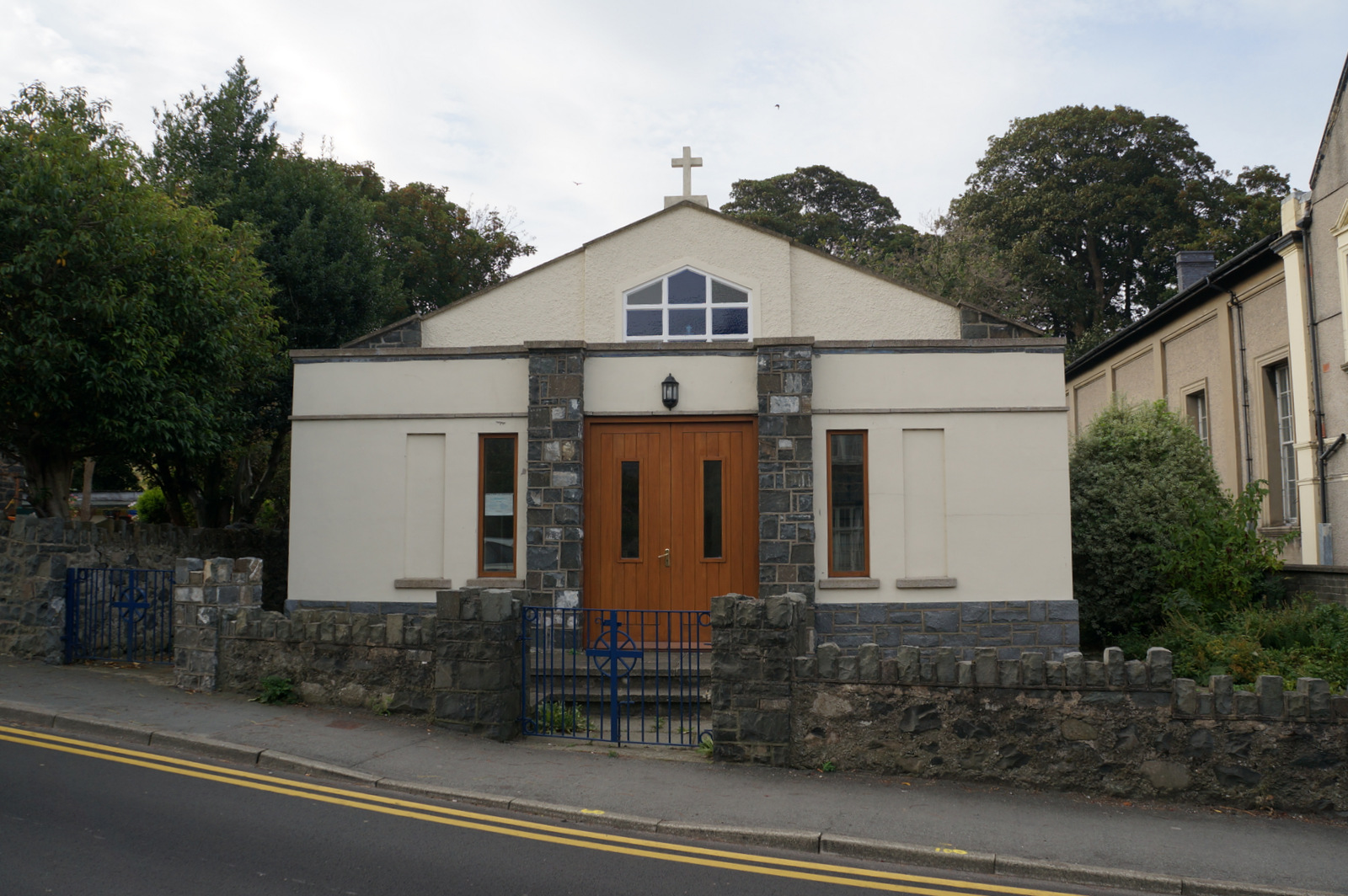
St Mary of the Angels Catholic Church
