= Glan Clwyd Hospital =

Hospital in Denbighshire, Wales

Glan Clwyd Hospital Ysbyty Glan Clwyd (Welsh)
- Betsi Cadwaladr University Health Board
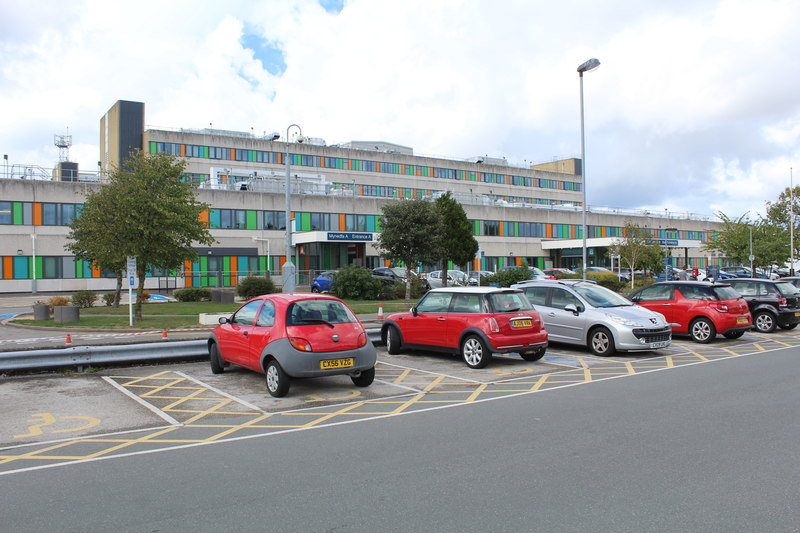
- Glan Clwyd Hospital

- Shown in Denbighshire

Geography
- Location: Bodelwyddan, Denbighshire, Wales
- Coordinates: 53.2714°N 3.4957°W

Organisation
- Care system: NHS Wales
- Type: General

Services
- Beds: 466

History
- Founded: 1980

Links
- Lists: Hospitals in Wales

Glan Clwyd Hospital (Welsh: Ysbyty Glan Clwyd) is a hospital in Bodelwyddan, Denbighshire, Wales. It is managed by the Betsi Cadwaladr University Health Board.

== History ==
The hospital, which was built with six operating theatres at a cost of £16 million, opened in 1980. Double Olympic gold medallist Jade Jones was born in the hospital in March 1993. The North Wales Cancer Treatment Centre, which provides cancer treatment for patients across North Wales, opened at the hospital in June 2000 and was then run by the North Wales Cancer Service. A new operating theatre department was opened in 2012, followed by a new pathology department in 2013.

== Performance ==
A report by Donna Ockenden claiming "institutionalised abuse" at the Tawel Fan psychiatric ward at the Ablett Unit was published in May 2015. Families described seeing patients "constantly crawling on dirty floors" and being "like a zombie...drugged up". As a result, seven employees were referred to the Nursing and Midwifery Council and three to the General Medical Council. Chief Executive Trevor Purt described the treatment of some patients as "shocking, inexcusable and unacceptable".

Hip replacement surgery waiting times (112 weeks) at the hospital were branded an "outrage" by Darren Millar in February 2017.

== Improvements ==
A new Emergency Department (replacing the old A&E at the left hand side of the main building), a new theatre complex, mortuary and bereavement centre, X ray centre (replacing the two old X ray centres, one of which was in the old A&E) and Pathology building opened in 2014/15.

Plans to downgrade maternity services at Glan Clwyd were published in 2015. After a public outcry, multiple demonstrations, a series of often fractious public consultation meetings across north Wales, and a petition signed by over 15,000 people, the plans were finally abandoned later that year.

In 2017, Glan Clwyd initiated an improvement scheme which will centralise neonatal intensive care in North Wales.
