= Betsi Cadwaladr University Health Board =

NHS local health board in North Wales

- Bwrdd Iechyd Prifysgol Betsi Cadwaladr

- Map of service area in Wales
- Type: NHS Wales; Local health board
- Established: 1 October 2009
- Headquarters: Penrhosgarnedd; Bangor; LL57 2PW
- Region served: Anglesey; Conwy; Denbighshire; Flintshire; Gwynedd; Wrexham
- Hospitals: Abergele Hospital; Bryn Beryl Hospital; Bryn y Neuadd Hospital; Cefni Hospital; Chirk Community Hospital; Colwyn Bay Community Hospital; Deeside Community Hospital; Denbigh Community Hospital; Dolgellau and Barmouth Hospital; Glan Clwyd Hospital; Holywell Community Hospital; Llandudno General Hospital; Mold Community Hospital; Royal Alexandra Hospital; Ruthin Community Hospital; Tywyn Hospital; Wrexham Maelor Hospital; Ysbyty Alltwen; Ysbyty Eryri; Ysbyty Gwynedd; Ysbyty Penrhos Stanley
- Staff: 15,481 (2018/19)
- Website: bcuhb.nhs.wales

Betsi Cadwaladr University Health Board (BCUHB; Welsh: Bwrdd Iechyd Prifysgol Betsi Cadwaladr) is the local health board of NHS Wales for the north of Wales. It is the largest health organisation in Wales, providing a full range of primary, community, mental health, and acute hospital services for a population of around 694,000 people across the six principal areas of north Wales (Anglesey, Conwy, Denbighshire, Flintshire, Gwynedd and Wrexham) as well as some parts of Mid Wales, Cheshire and Shropshire. Betsi Cadwaladr University Health Board is the operational name of Betsi Cadwaladr Local Health Board.

The Board is responsible for the operation of three district general hospitals, 22 other acute and community hospitals, and a network of over 90 health centres, clinics, community health team bases, and mental health units. It coordinates the work of 94 GP practices and NHS services provided by North Wales dentists, opticians and pharmacies.

The Board is named after Betsi Cadwaladr, a Welsh nurse born in Bala, Gwynedd in 1789. Towards the end of her life – in her mid-60s – she worked alongside Florence Nightingale, nursing casualties of the Crimean War.

== History ==
The Betsi Cadwaladr University Health Board combined the North Wales NHS Trust (previously North East Wales NHS Trust and Conwy & Denbighshire NHS Trust), the North West Wales NHS Trust, and the six Local Health Boards of Anglesey, Conwy, Denbighshire, Flintshire, Gwynedd, and Wrexham.

A report in 2013 by the Healthcare Inspectorate Wales and the Wales Audit Office said that leadership at the board was "fundamentally compromised" because the relationship between the chairman and chief executive had broken down. Both subsequently resigned.

The organisation was placed in special measures in June 2015, following a mental health services report alleging institutional abuse 2012/13, the Tawel Fan unit was closed in December 2014. On 24 November 2020, the Welsh Government announced that the health board would be taken out of special measures with immediate effect.

In July 2025, Betsi Cadwaladr University Health Board was told it would stay under the highest level of government support, known as Level 5 special measures. This came even though it had made steady progress over the past two years. The head of the board, Carol Shillabeer, said they had improved in areas like leadership, safety, and how the board is run.

NHS Wales said the board still needs to improve how it works day-to-day, bring in a better way of operating, and continue fixing old issues.

The health board, which looks after over 700,000 people in North Wales, has been under special measures since February 2023 and will continue to be closely watched through regular review meetings.

== Hospitals ==
Current

- Abergele Hospital, Abergele
- Bryn Beryl Hospital, Pwllheli
- Bryn y Neuadd Hospital, Llanfairfechan
- Cefni Hospital, Llangefni
- Chirk Community Hospital, Chirk
- Colwyn Bay Community Hospital, Colwyn Bay
- Deeside Community Hospital, Deeside
- Denbigh Community Hospital, Denbigh
- Dolgellau and Barmouth Hospital, Dolgellau
- Glan Clwyd Hospital, Bodelwyddan, Denbighshire
- Holywell Community Hospital, Holywell
- Llandudno General Hospital, Llandudno
- Mold Community Hospital, Mold
- Royal Alexandra Hospital, Rhyl
- Penley Community Hospital, Penley
- Ruthin Community Hospital, Ruthin
- Tywyn Hospital, Tywyn
- Wrexham Maelor Hospital, Wrexham
- Ysbyty Alltwen, Tremadog
- Ysbyty Eryri, Caernarfon
- Ysbyty Gwynedd, Bangor, Gwynedd
- Ysbyty Penrhos Stanley, Holyhead

Former

- Conwy Hospital, Conwy
- Ffestiniog Memorial Hospital, Blaenau Ffestiniog
- H.M. Stanley Hospital, St. Asaph
- Llangollen Community Hospital, Llangollen
- Minffordd Hospital, Bangor
- Ysbyty Bron y Garth, Penrhyndeudraeth

== See also ==
- Betsi Cadwaladr
