= List of hospitals in Wales =

The following is a list of currently operating hospitals in Wales. They are sorted by health board or trust.

== Aneurin Bevan University Health Board ==
Headquarters: Llanfrechfa Grange Hospital, Cwmbran

- Chepstow Community Hospital, Chepstow
- County Hospital, Pontypool
- Grange University Hospital, Cwmbran
- Llanfrechfa Grange Hospital, Cwmbran
- Maindiff Court Hospital, Abergavenny
- Monnow Vale Integrated Health and Social Care Facility, Monmouth
- Nevill Hall Hospital, Abergavenny
- Redwood Memorial Hospital
- Royal Gwent Hospital, Newport
- St Cadoc's Hospital, Caerleon, Newport
- St Woolos Hospital, Newport
- Ysbyty Aneurin Bevan, Ebbw Vale
- Ysbyty'r Tri Chwm, Ebbw Vale, Blaenau Gwent
- Ysbyty Ystrad Fawr, Ystrad Mynach

== Betsi Cadwaladr University Health Board ==
Headquarters: Ysbyty Gwynedd, Bangor

- Abergele Hospital, Abergele
- Bryn Beryl Hospital, Pwllheli
- Bryn y Neuadd Hospital, Llanfairfechan
- Cefni Hospital, Llangefni
- Chirk Community Hospital, Chirk
- Colwyn Bay Community Hospital, Colwyn Bay
- Deeside Community Hospital, Deeside
- Denbigh Community Hospital, Denbigh
- Dolgellau and Barmouth Hospital, Dolgellau
- Ffestiniog Memorial Hospital
- Glan Clwyd Hospital, Bodelwyddan
- Holywell Community Hospital, Holywell
- Llandudno General Hospital, Llandudno
- Mold Community Hospital, Mold
- Royal Alexandra Hospital, Rhyl
- Ruthin Community Hospital, Ruthin
- Tywyn Hospital, Tywyn
- Wrexham Maelor Hospital, Wrexham
- Ysbyty Alltwen, Tremadog
- Ysbyty Eryri, Caernarfon
- Ysbyty Gwynedd, Bangor
- Ysbyty Penrhos Stanley, Holyhead

== Cardiff and Vale University Health Board ==
Headquarters: University Hospital of Wales, Cardiff

- Barry Hospital, Barry, Vale of Glamorgan
- Cardiff Royal Infirmary, Roath, Cardiff
- Noah's Ark Children's Hospital for Wales, Heath
- Rookwood Hospital
- St David's Hospital, Canton, Cardiff
- University Hospital Llandough, Llandough, Vale of Glamorgan
- University Hospital of Wales, Heath (also known as Heath Hospital)

== Cwm Taf Morgannwg University Health Board ==
Headquarters: Dewi Sant Hospital, Pontypridd

- Dewi Sant Hospital, Pontypridd
- Glanrhyd Hospital, Bridgend
- Maesteg Community Hospital, Bridgend
- Pontypridd Cottage Hospital, Pontypridd
- Prince Charles Hospital, Merthyr Tydfil
- Princess of Wales Hospital, Bridgend
- Royal Glamorgan Hospital, Llantrisant
- Ysbyty Cwm Cynon, Mountain Ash
- Ysbyty Cwm Rhondda, Llwynypia
- Ysbyty George Thomas, Treorchy

== Hywel Dda University Health Board ==
Headquarters: Hafan Derwen, St David's Park, Carmarthen

- Aberaeron Hospital, Aberaeron
- Amman Valley Hospital, Ammanford
- Bronglais Hospital, Aberystwyth
- Cardigan and District Community Hospital, Cardigan
- Glangwili General Hospital, Carmarthen
- Llandovery Hospital, Llandovery
- Prince Philip Hospital, Llanelli
- South Pembrokeshire Hospital, Pembroke Dock
- St David's Hospital, Carmarthen (Cwm Seren, Tudor House and Ty Bryn)
- Tenby Cottage Hospital, Tenby
- Tregaron Hospital, Tregaron
- Withybush General Hospital, Haverfordwest

== Powys Teaching Health Board ==
Headquarters: Mansion House, Bronllys

- Brecon War Memorial Hospital, Brecon
- Bro Ddyfi Community Hospital, Machynlleth
- Bronllys Hospital, Bronllys
- Knighton Hospital, Knighton
- Llandrindod Wells County War Memorial Hospital, Llandrindod Wells
- Llanidloes War Memorial Hospital, Llanidloes
- Montgomery County Infirmary, Newtown
- Victoria Memorial Hospital, Welshpool
- Ystradgynlais Community Hospital, Ystradgynlais

== Swansea Bay University Health Board ==
Headquarters: Baglan Bay, Port Talbot

- Cefn Coed Hospital, Cockett, Swansea
- Gorseinon Hospital, Gorseinon
- Morriston Hospital, Morriston
- Neath Port Talbot Hospital, Port Talbot
- Singleton Hospital, Swansea
- Tonna Hospital, Neath

== Velindre NHS Trust ==
Headquarters: Charnwood Court, Parc Nantgarw, Cardiff

- Velindre Cancer Centre, Whitchurch, Cardiff

Other divisions of the trust provide national services such as breast test screening, cervical cancer screening, IT, and the national blood service.

== Military hospitals ==
- 203 (Welsh) Field Hospital

== Welsh Ambulance Services NHS Trust ==
Headquarters: H.M. Stanley Hospital, St Asaph

The Welsh Ambulance Services NHS Trust manages all ambulance services within Wales.

== See also ==
- List of NHS Wales trusts and health boards
