= NHS Wales =

Publicly-funded healthcare system in Wales

- GIG Cymru (Welsh)

Agency overview
- Formed: May 1969; 57 years ago
- Jurisdiction: Wales
- Headquarters: Cathays Park, Cardiff, Wales
- Employees: 96,813 FTE (June 2024)
- Annual budget: £8.3bn GBP
- Parent agency: Welsh Government
- Child agency: 7 local health boards
- Website: www.nhs.wales

NHS Wales (Welsh: GIG Cymru) is the publicly-funded healthcare system in Wales, and one of the four systems which make up the National Health Service (Welsh: Gwasanaeth Iechyd Gwladol) in the United Kingdom.

NHS Wales was formed as part of the public health system for England and Wales created by the National Health Service Act 1946, with powers over the NHS in Wales coming under the Secretary of State for Wales in 1969. That year, the latter took over much of the responsibility for health services in Wales, being supported in this by the Welsh Office, which had been established in 1964.

Following the pre-legislative Welsh devolution referendum of 18 September 1997, Royal Assent was given on 31 July to the Government of Wales Act 1998. This created the National Assembly for Wales, to which overall responsibility for NHS Wales was devolved in 1999. Responsibility, therefore, for NHS Wales was passed to the Welsh Government under devolution in 1999 and has since then been the responsibility of the Welsh Cabinet Secretary for Health and Social Care.

NHS Wales provides emergency services and a range of primary, secondary, and specialist tertiary care services. District General Hospitals provide outpatient, inpatient, and accident and emergency services, and there is a network of community hospitals run by GPs. Specialist hospitals provide services such as burns units and plastic and cardiac surgery. NHS Wales also funds GP services, dental services, pharmacies, and sexual health services. Community services are also provided, including district nurses, health visitors, midwives, community-based speech therapists, physiotherapists and occupational therapists.

== Structure ==
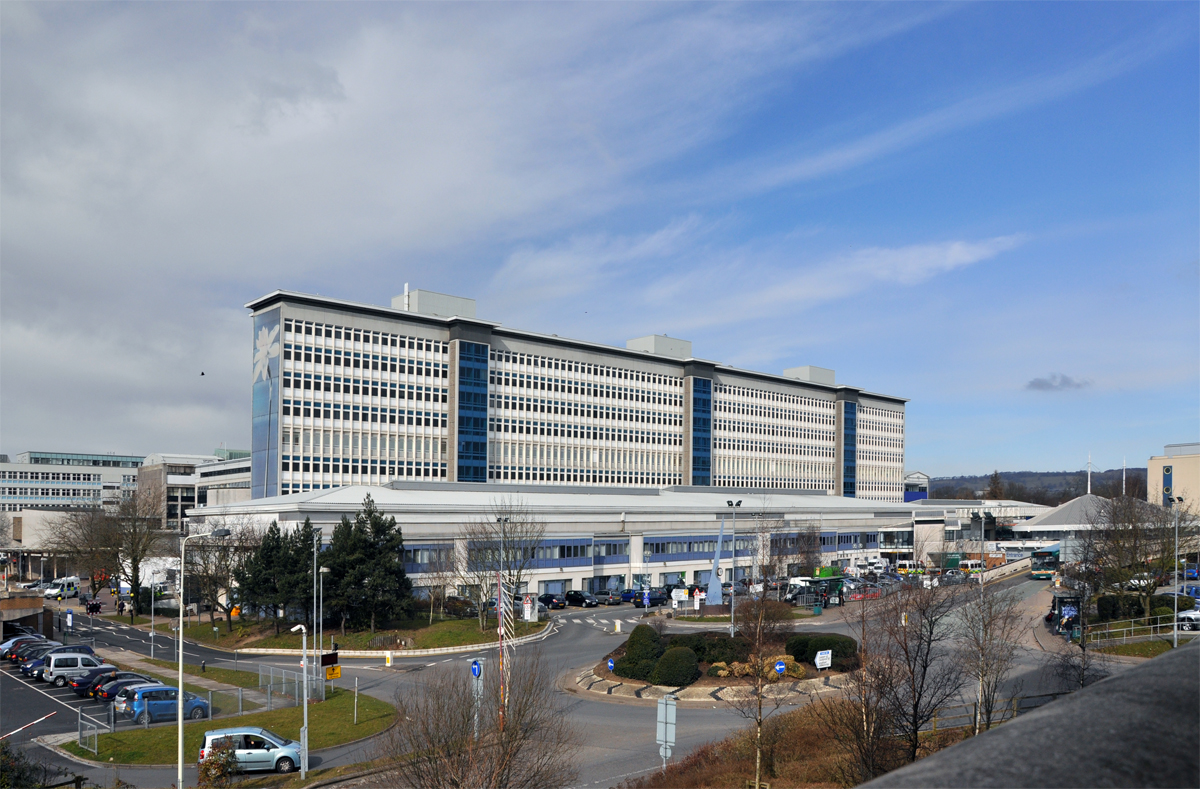
The University Hospital of Wales in Cardiff.

NHS Wales provides services through seven health boards and three NHS trusts.

=== Health boards ===
The seven local health boards (LHBs) in Wales are shown below. Each LHB is responsible for delivering all NHS healthcare services within a geographical area, divided into a number of Network Clusters.

Betsi Cadwaladr University Health Board: Anglesey; Arfon; Central & South Denbighshire; Conwy East; Conwy west; North East Flintshire; Dwyfor; North West Flintshire; Meirionnydd; South Flintshire; North Denbighshire; South Wrexham; North & West Wrexham; Central Wrexham; Hywel Dda University Health Board: Amman/Gwendraeth; Llanelli; North Ceredigion; North Pembrokeshire; South Ceredigion; South Pembrokeshire; Taf/Tywi; Cwm Taf Morgannwg University Health Board: Bridgend East Network; Bridgend North Network; Bridgend West Network; North Cynon; North Merthyr Tydfil; North Rhondda; North Taf Ely; South Cynon; South Merthyr Tydfil; South Rhondda; South Taf Ely	Powys Teaching Health Board: Mid Powys; North Powys; South Powys; Cardiff and Vale University Health Board: Cardiff East; Cardiff South East; City & Cardiff South; Cardiff North; Cardiff South West; Cardiff West; Central Vale; Eastern Vale; Western Vale; Swansea Bay University Health Board: Afan; BayHealth; CityHealth; Cwmtawe; Llwchwr; Neath; Penderi; Upper Valleys; Aneurin Bevan University Health Board: Blaenau Gwent East; Blaenau Gwent West; Caerphilly East; Caerphilly North; Caerphilly South; Monmouthshire North; Monmouthshire South; Newport North; Newport East; Newport West; Torfaen North; Torfaen South

=== NHS trusts ===
The three NHS trusts, called "all-Wales trusts", are:

- the Welsh Ambulance Service
- Velindre University NHS Trust, which operates the Velindre Cancer Centre and the Welsh Blood Service
- Public Health Wales

The current health boards were created on 1 October 2009 following a reorganisation of NHS Wales that saw the abolition of the 22 local health boards (LHBs) and seven NHS trusts that had existed since 2003. Since the reorganisation health boards have been responsible for delivering all NHS services, replacing the two-tiered trust and LHB system. In April 2019 responsibility for health services in Bridgend County Borough was transferred from the former Abertawe Bro Morgannwg University Health Board to the former Cwm Taf University Health Board, leading to changes in names and boundaries for both health boards.

Five of the health boards paid for spot contracts with private healthcare providers costing a total of more than £6 million between 2013 and 2015 to carry out NHS work on elective surgery.

=== General practice ===
In 2019 the Welsh government decided to introduce an NHS indemnity scheme for GPs, to reduce the financial burden of their insurance premiums. The cost, £11.3 million, was to be deducted from the global sum, thus reducing GP practice income. This was not welcomed by the British Medical Association, which complained that indemnity costs for all other staff were borne centrally. A similar scheme in England was centrally funded.

== Other NHS Wales bodies ==
Another important organisation is the Health Commission Wales, an executive agency of the Welsh Government whose primary role is to organise and fund tertiary care and other highly specialist services. It also provides advice and guidance about specialist services to other parts of NHS Wales.

Health Education and Improvement Wales is a Special Health Authority that provides education and training services for health care professionals.

The NHS Wales Shared Services Partnership (NWSSP) supports NHS Wales through the provision of a range of support functions and services at an NHS Wales wide scale. It is hosted within Velindre University NHS Trust, as well as being governed by the Shared Services Partnership Committee.

Digital Health and Care Wales (DHCW), established in April 2021 is a Special Health Authority responsible for building and designing digital services for health and care in Wales. DHCW replaces the NHS Wales Informatics Service (NWIS) that was established in April 2010.

Health Technology Wales (HTW), established in November 2017, is responsible for the identification, appraisal and adoption of non-medicine technologies in Welsh health and care settings. HTW is hosted within the Velindre University NHS Trust.

NHS 111 Wales provides a non-emergency telephone health advice and information service. It operates 24 hours a day every day of the year with callers being given the option of communicating in Welsh or English. NHS 111 Wales is part of the Welsh Ambulance Service NHS Trust.

There are seven community health councils in Wales that monitor the quality of the NHS services provided within the seven Health Board areas and provide information about available services to the public.

== Developments ==
The Welsh government introduced a national robotics assisted surgery strategy in March 2022 with additional funding provided by local health boards over 10 years.

== Staff ==
Andrew Goodall (right), CEO NHS Wales, during the COVID-19 pandemic in Wales; January 2021

NHS Wales provides public health care in Wales and directly employs 94,325 staff, making it Wales's biggest employer. In April 2018 there were 1,926 general practitioners working in Wales, 83 fewer than in 2017.

Most staff working for NHS Wales, including non-clinical staff and GPs (most of whom are independent contractors), are eligible to join the NHS Pension Scheme, which, from 1 April 2015, is a career salary-average defined benefit scheme.

=== Pay ===
The Welsh Health Minister Mark Drakeford decided that from September 2014 NHS Wales staff would be paid at least the living wage, resulting in about 2,400 employees receiving an increase in salary of up to £470 above UK wide Agenda for Change rates.

The pay deal for NHS staff in Wales for 2018–2021 was said to be better than that for NHS staff in England because it guaranteed basic pay awards for the next three years to staff who are at the top of their bands.

== Cross-border issues ==
The geography of Wales means that there are areas where cross-border arrangements are necessary. The population of north Wales is too small to support specialist units, so patients travel to Liverpool and Manchester. There are no large hospitals in Mid Wales at all. More than 31,000 Welsh patients were treated in English hospitals in 2013/4. In October 2014 Jeremy Hunt claimed that English hospitals close to the Welsh border were under "absolutely intolerable pressure" and that people were fleeing the "second class health service" in Wales.

Entitlement to free prescription charges is based on the GP with whom a patient is registered, so some patients who live in England benefit from them.

University College London Hospitals NHS Foundation Trust complained in June 2015 that commissioners outside England use a "burdensome" prior approval process, where a funding agreement is needed before each stage of treatment. At the end of 2014–15 the trust was owed more than £2.3m for treating patients from outside England. A survey by the Health Service Journal suggested there was £21m of outstanding debt relating to patients from the devolved nations treated in the last three years, against total invoicing of £315m by English NHS trusts.

== Performance ==
In 2014 the Nuffield Trust and the Health Foundation produced a report comparing the performance of the NHS in the four countries of the UK since devolution in 1999. They included data for the North East of England as an area more similar to the devolved areas than the rest of England. They found that there was little evidence that any one country was moving ahead of the others consistently across the available indicators of performance. There had been improvements in all four countries in life expectancy and in rates of mortality amenable to health care. Despite the hotly contested policy differences between the four countries there was little evidence, where there was comparable data, of any significant differences in outcomes. The authors also complained about the increasingly limited set of comparable data on the four health systems of the UK.

Rising social costs have led to a significant increase in the time between patients being declared "medically fit" and finding social care placements in many cases.

NHS Wales has not met targets for A&E. Figures for December show the worst A&E performance since March 2016 but attendance was 5.4% higher than in 2017. 78.9% of patients were admitted transferred or discharged after spending less than four hours in emergency care facilities, the target is 95%. This is 1.5% lower than in December 2016. 70% of "red" ambulance calls came within eight minutes (there is a 65% target). Ambulance services are under resourced, staff miss breaks and have to work beyond their shift. Due to pressure sickness absences for ambulance staff reached the highest level since records began in the first three months of 2018.

== Political criticism ==
A survey of attitudes to the NHS in 2014 concluded that the Welsh held the NHS dear to their hearts, though almost two-thirds of respondents felt the performance of the Welsh NHS had declined in recent years. The survey found a wide range of problems caused by a lack of resources. Staff complained that Whistleblowers risked professional suicide and some patients said complaints or concerns were not taken seriously by NHS managers

Defenders of the NHS in Wales point out that it operates on £1,900 per person compared with the North East of England, which is similar to Wales in terms of "need" and gets £2,100 per person. While some waiting lists, such as for orthopaedic surgery, may be longer in Wales, some other aspects of the service, such as cancer care, are better in Wales. English figures are not collected and reported on the same basis as Welsh ones. 90% patients who used Welsh hospitals and GPs in 2013 were satisfied or very satisfied with their care. In contrast across Britain as a whole only 60% said they were satisfied with the NHS.

In October 2014 the Daily Mail claimed that "Around half of Welsh cancer sufferers must wait six weeks or more for many scans and tests yet in England ... The comparable figure is less than 6%." The Welsh Government responded by pointing out that targets for timely treatment of cancer were the same in Wales as in England, for example that 98% not on the urgent pathway should start definitive treatment within the target time of 31 days. On the latest figures the performance in Wales was actually slightly better than in England. Wales has a specific waiting time target for diagnostic tests, different from England – the maximum wait for access to specified diagnostic tests is 8 weeks. In August 2014 24,107 patients were waiting more than 8 weeks for diagnostic tests in Wales; 70% receive their tests within the target time. It defending the decision not to set up a Cancer Drugs Fund as in England, on the ground that the fund's own chair has admitted it provides funding for cancer drugs which have 'no impact on survival' and 'uncertainty as to whether quality of life is improved or not' and pointed out that the All-Wales Medicines Strategy Group got new drugs such as Sativex approved for use in Wales more quickly than the National Institute for Health and Care Excellence in England.

In February 2016 the Organisation for Economic Co-operation and Development published a review which concluded that performance of the NHS in Wales was little different from that in the rest of the UK. They described performance across the UK as "fairly mediocre" saying that great policies were not being translated into great practices. They suggested that GPs should be more involved in health boards and that resources should be shifted out of hospitals.

In November 2022 a survey by Ipsos and the Health Foundation found just 19% of the Welsh public were confident about their devolved government plans for the NHS.

== Complaints ==
It was reported that there had been 10,395 recorded staff complaints about staffing levels between 2012 and 2015. The highest number of complaints (3,609) related to Cardiff and Vale University Health Board. The government response was that since 1999, the total number of staff working in the Welsh NHS had increased by a third. In 2015, there were 2,000 GPs working in the NHS in Wales, the highest number ever and an increase of 11% since 2003. The number of nursing, midwifery and health visiting staff increased from 28,157 in 2010 to 28,300 in 2014.

== Cross-party commission ==
In February 2015 Mark Drakeford wrote to the leader of the Welsh Liberal Democrats Kirsty Williams proposing a cross-party commission on the future of the NHS in Wales. Drakeford said: "Discussions about the long-term future of the Welsh NHS should sit outside the knockabout of day-to-day party politics." In March 2015 both Plaid Cymru and the Welsh Conservatives rejected the proposal because the terms of reference for the commission had already been set out.

== See also ==
- List of hospitals in Wales
- National Health Service (England)
- NHS Scotland
- Health and Social Care (Northern Ireland)
