= Healthcare in Wales =

Map of the seven local health boards; Betsi Cadwaladr (north), Hywel Dda (west), Powys (mid), Swansea Bay (south-west), Cwm Taf (south-central), Aneurin Bevan (south-east), Cardiff and Vale (southernmost).

Healthcare in Wales is mainly provided by the Welsh public health service, NHS Wales. NHS Wales provides healthcare to all permanent residents that is free at the point of need and paid for from general taxation. Health is a matter that is devolved, and considerable differences are now developing between the public healthcare systems in the different countries of the United Kingdom, collectively the National Health Service (NHS). Though the public system dominates healthcare provision, private health care and a wide variety of alternative and complementary treatments are available for those willing to pay.

The largest hospital in the country is usually the University Hospital of Wales hospital, however the temporary Dragon's Heart Hospital set up in response to the COVID-19 pandemic in Wales was larger, and is the second largest hospital in the United Kingdom.

Unlike in England, NHS prescriptions are free to everyone registered with a GP in Wales (although those on low incomes, under 18, and under 60 do get prescriptions for free in England).

Initially administered by the UK Government, since 1999 NHS Wales has been funded and managed by the Welsh Government.

== NHS trusts and health boards ==
Before 2009, Wales was divided into 10 NHS trusts and 22 local health boards: The ten NHS trusts were:

- Abertawe Bro Morgannwg University NHS Trust
- Cardiff and Vale NHS Trust
- Cwm Taf NHS Trust
- Conwy & Denbighshire NHS Trust
- Gwent Healthcare NHS Trust
- Hywel Dda NHS Trust
- North East Wales NHS Trust
- North West Wales NHS Trust
- Powys Teaching Health Board (replaced Powys Healthcare NHS Trust in 2003)
- Velindre University NHS Trust

=== Current healthboards ===
Wales is now divided into 7 local health boards and 3 NHS trusts:

- Local Health Boards:
  - Aneurin Bevan University Health Board
  - Betsi Cadwaladr University Health Board
  - Cardiff and Vale University Health Board
  - Cwm Taf Morgannwg University Health Board
  - Hywel Dda University Health Board
  - Powys Teaching Health Board
  - Swansea Bay University Health Board
- All-Wales NHS trusts:
  - Welsh Ambulance Services NHS Trust
  - Velindre University NHS Trust
  - Public Health Wales

Welsh Ambulance Services NHS Trust manages all ambulance services in Wales from its base in Denbighshire.

== Primary Care ==
Out-of-hours services in north and west Wales were reported to have reached ‘crisis point’ in April 2019. Services at Withybush General Hospital in Pembrokeshire and Prince Philip Hospital in Carmarthenshire had to close for the weekend of 30/31 March. During 2018 there were at least 146 urgent care shifts in Wales which did not have a single GP on the out-of-hours service.

== Pharmacies ==
There are plans to enhance the role of community pharmacists in Wales. The plans commissioned by the Welsh government and drawn up by the Welsh Pharmaceutical Committee envisage pharmacy independent prescribers in every community pharmacy integrated with GP practices for access to patient records. This will enable the common ailment service, which enables pharmacists to treat 26 common illnesses, such as dry eye, indigestion and cold sores, to be extended and the pharmacists will be able to refer patients for tests. 702 pharmacies in Wales provided a total 43,158 consultations common ailment service consultations in 2018/2019, more than double the number in the previous year. In May 2019 97% of pharmacies in the country were offering the service.

A pilot ‘test and treat’ service for sore throat began in 70 community pharmacies in the Cwm Taf and Betsi Cadwaladr local health board areas in November 2018. The pharmacists do a swab test to find out if the sore throat was caused by a viral or a bacterial infection. Only 20% of cases required a prescription of antibiotics.

== Community Services ==
In April 2019 Vaughan Gething announced an £11 million fund to transform health and social care services in North Wales. Mental health practitioners will work with ambulance crews and in police control rooms and crisis cafes, safe havens and strengthened home treatment services will be developed. Early intervention services for children and old people will be strengthened.

== Care and health statistics ==
=== Wait Times ===
Healthcare wait times for patients in Wales are longer than wait times for their English counterparts. Specifically, an analysis by a UK based independent health think tank Nuffield Trust, found that "Patients in Wales have been more likely than their Scottish or English counterparts to wait four hours in every single month since 2012 [to 2021]" However, they also note that "they fared better than those who turned to the struggling Northern Irish health care system."

Two potential causes for longer wait times in Wales follow:

- "Firstly, although the Welsh NHS receives more money than the English NHS per patient, this may not be enough more to account for an older population with a higher mortality rate."
- "A second reason may be that the NHS in Wales is less efficient or less focused on delivering timely care. While it may be influenced by the kinds of procedures people need, length of stay data appears to suggest that Wales is taking much longer to get patients treated and safely discharged."

In January 2026 the NHS Wales app added a functionality that allowed patients to track their place on waiting lists. Sarah Murphy, the Minister for Mental Health and Wellbeing at the time, explained that the app update was part of a commitment to make wait times in Wales more transparent.

=== Quality of Care ===
Among patients who get care in the Wales healthcare system, satisfaction is reasonably high.

- According to the National Survey for Wales results for 2021/22:
  - "72% of adults reported good or very good general health."
  - "86% of survey respondents who had recently used health services were very or fairly satisfied with the care from their GP and 95% were satisfied with the care received at their last NHS hospital appointment."

=== General Health ===
Obesity continues to plague the people of Wales. "The percentage of adults who are overweight or obese continues to rise, reaching 62% in 2021/22. Rates are highest among men and those living in more deprived areas."

== Coronavirus outbreak ==
The Welsh healthcare system has been particularly impacted by the outbreak of Coronavirus in early 2020. This has been exacerbated by the fact the Welsh population is, according to Nuffield Trust research, on average "older, sicker and more deprived than the English population – so its NHS has to work harder".

The Welsh Government made specific changes to healthcare in Wales to deal with the outbreak, including cancelling elective operations, building the UK's second largest hospital at the Millennium Stadium in Cardiff, and approving the "COVID emergency ventilator", a device designed by a medical consultant based in Ammanford. Nonetheless, Wales in late March had the largest local outbreak in the UK, centred around the Aneurin Bevan Health Board in Newport which saw a higher number of cases per 1,000 people than any other city including London.

== See also ==
- Healthcare in the United Kingdom
- List of hospitals in Wales
- Social care in Wales
