= Carmarthenshire NHS Trust =

Former NHS trust in Wales

Carmarthenshire NHS Trust was an NHS Trust in Wales. The headquarters of the trust was in Glangwili General Hospital, Carmarthen. The Hywel Dda Health Board HQ is in Haverfordwest.

The trust served around 170,000 people across Carmarthenshire and neighbouring counties. It had two main hospitals, Prince Philip Hospital, Llanelli, and Glangwili General Hospital in Carmarthen, with accident & emergency services. There were four smaller, community hospitals.

Carmarthenshire NHS Trust had over 3,200 staff. The chairman was Mrs Margaret Price, and the chief executive was Paul Barnett.

It merged with Ceredigion & Mid Wales NHS Trust and Pembrokeshire & Derwen NHS Trust in April 2008. The name for the newly merged trust is Hywel Dda NHS Trust.

== Major hospitals ==
Major hospitals were as follows:

- Amman Valley Hospital
- Bryntirion Hospital, closed in 2004.
- Llandovery Hospital
- Mynydd Mawr Hospital, closed in 2013.
- Prince Philip Hospital
- Glangwili General Hospital
