= COVID-19 pandemic in Wales =

- Disease: COVID-19
- Pathogen: SARS-CoV-2
- Location: Wales
- First outbreak: Wuhan, Hubei, China
- Index case: Caerphilly
- Arrival date: 28 February 2020 – 5 May 2023 (3 years and 3 months)
- Confirmed cases: 874,232 (Note: Includes 18,971 Welsh residents currently outside Wales)
- Hospitalised cases: 346; 37,186
- Ventilator cases: 31 (active, as of 28 December 2021)
- Recovered: no data
- Deaths: 6,913 (deaths within 28 days of positive test, up to 13 February 2022); 9,102 (deaths with COVID-19 on the death certificate by date of death, up to 10 December 2021)
- Fatality rate: 202.6 (death rate per 100,000 who died within 28 days of the first positive test); 279.5 (death rate per 100,000 whose death certificate mentioned COVID-19)

Government website
- gov.wales/coronavirus

The COVID-19 pandemic was confirmed to have spread to Wales on 28 February 2020, with a case being reported in the Swansea area; this first known case was a person who had recently returned from Italy. The first known case of community transmission was reported on 11 March in the Caerphilly area.

Wide-ranging restrictions began on many aspects of life in the second half of March 2020; restrictions were relaxed in Wales during the summer once the first wave of the virus had passed. In the autumn of that year, with cases rising, restrictions began to be tightened again with individual areas being placed under localised lockdowns. A two-week complete "circuit-breaker" lockdown began in late October. Rising cases and a new variant of the virus led to restrictions being increased again in December. The rollout of COVID-19 vaccinations and a fall in cases led to restrictions being relaxed in the spring and summer. Restrictions were briefly tightened and relaxed at around the end of 2021 due to a new variant of the virus. Most COVID-19 related legal restrictions concluded in Wales by the end of March and much of the infrastructure built up around managing the virus was wound down by the middle of 2022.

Many aspects of the response to COVID-19 were the responsibility of the devolved Welsh government. Health is a devolved matter in Scotland, Wales and Northern Ireland. Though healthcare is largely run by the state across the UK (through NHS Wales in the Welsh case) with some private and charitable provision, policy and outcomes vary. There was a Conservative Government in Westminster, and a Labour led Government in Cardiff; this ideological divide may have contributed to variances in approach.

== Timeline ==
=== Early spread (28 February – 23 March) ===
The first case of COVID-19 in Wales was confirmed on 28 February 2020 in a person who had returned from Northern Italy, and then transferred to a specialist NHS infection centre at the Royal Free Hospital in London. The Chief Medical Officer for Wales, Frank Atherton, said that the Government would be taking "all appropriate measures" to reduce the risk of transmission. On 10 March nine more cases were discovered in Wales, bringing the total to 15, the first significant jump in cases. On 16 March, the first death in Wales was reported in Wrexham.

On 18 March, the Welsh Government announced that all schools in Wales would be closing by 20 March. A limited number of schools were permitted to remain open to provide support for key workers and children with additional needs. It was further announced in the following days that all exams, including GCSEs and A-Levels, would be cancelled, with grades being based on existing work and predicted grades. Similar steps were taken across the UK on that date. On the day of the school closures, rules were also introduced compelling many leisure facilities to also close.

=== Lockdown (23 March – 1 June) ===
On 23 March, UK Prime Minister Boris Johnson, having the agreement of all devolved governments, announced a lockdown of the United Kingdom, with only essential services remaining open. This announcement was followed by the Welsh First Minister Mark Drakeford announcing that the measures would also cover Wales and would come into effect from that evening. The measures put in place restrict people from leaving their home for non-essential travel, with outside exercise limited to once a day. The measures that controlled exercise outside the home differed from those in England, where the measures in place did not stipulate a once-a-day restriction, whereas the Welsh version specifically limited exercise outside the home to once a day, with the maximum fine being £120, compared to £960 in England. On 20 May, the Government announced that the maximum fine would be increased to £1,920. Gatherings of two or more people, except individuals in the same household, were banned, whilst pubs, restaurants (with exception for take-aways) and shops selling 'non-essential goods' were ordered to closed.

On 25 March the Coronavirus Act 2020 was given Royal Assent, after passing through both Houses in the Parliament of the United Kingdom. The following day the Health Protection (Coronavirus, Restrictions) (Wales) Regulations 2020 were approved by the Senedd, giving the Welsh Government emergency powers to deal with various aspects of managing the pandemic. These new powers include the authority to:

- Take people into or keep them in quarantine
- Restrict or prohibit mass gatherings
- Close premises

On 26 March, Snowdon and other Welsh mountains were closed to the public, after a larger number of tourists had gathered on the mountains in the preceding days, causing traffic mayhem. Natural Resources Wales later announced that all sites and paths liable to have large numbers of people visiting, or pose a high risk, would be closed.

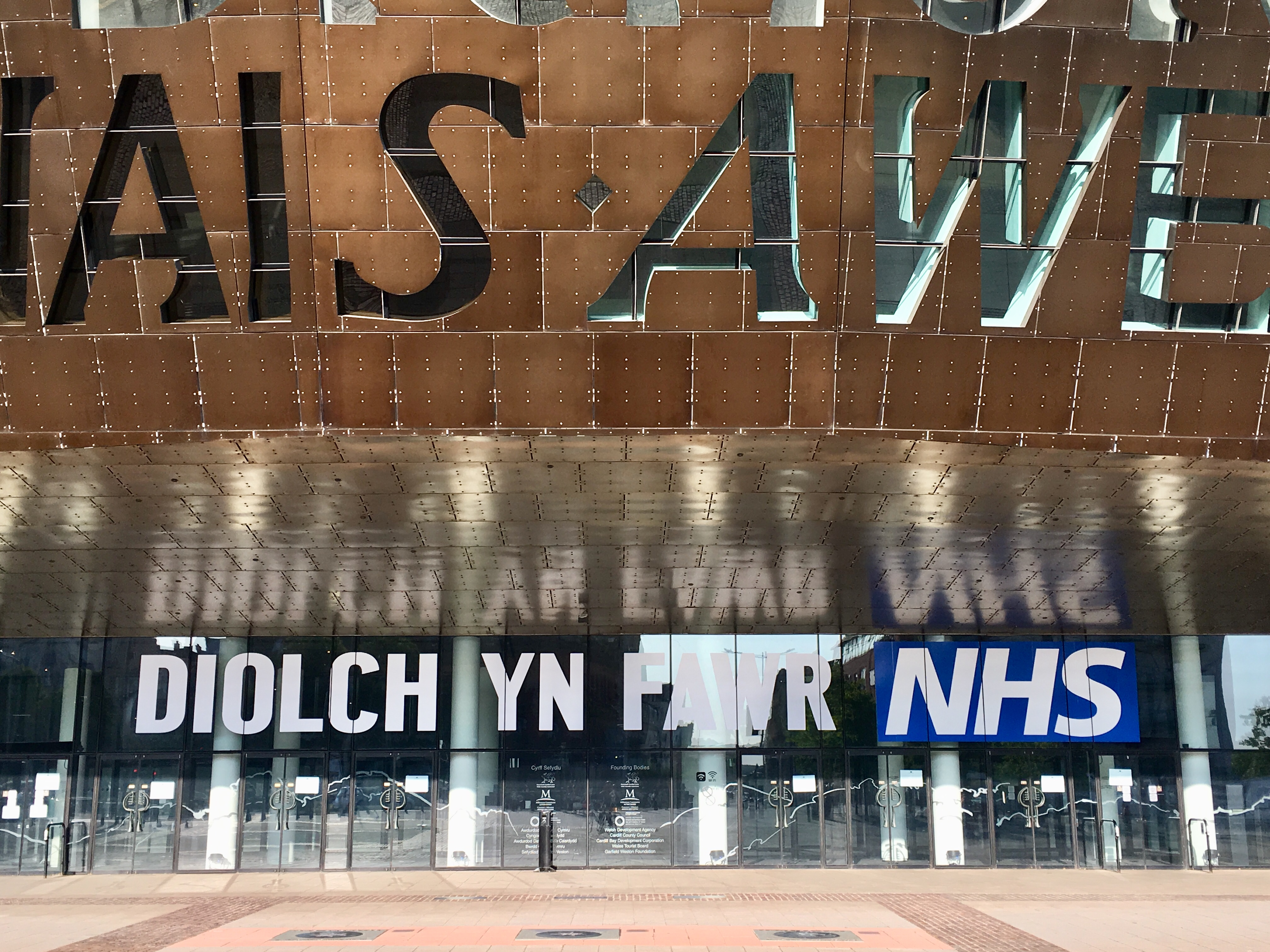
Diolch Yn Fawr NHS, Wales Millennium Centre

By 27 March, North Wales Police were patrolling the border between Wales and England because visitors were ignoring the stay-at-home instructions and travelling into Wales. In many cases the police were stopping cars entering from England; such border control had not happened between Wales and England since the 16th century.

On 2 April, it was announced that the number of confirmed cases had risen above 2,000 and the number of deaths in Wales had risen above 100. On 5 April the number of cases rose above 3,000.

On 6 April, Jitendra Rathod, a heart surgeon at University Hospital of Wales, died after testing positive for COVID-19. He was thought to have been the first health worker in Wales to die after being diagnosed with the disease.

On 7 April the number of deaths rose above 200. On the same day, distancing measures in the workplace, enforcing a two-metre distance between people, became law in Wales, requiring employers to take "all reasonable measures" to comply.

On 8 April the number of cases rose above 4,000 to 4,073, with 245 deaths notified. On the same day it was announced that the lockdown would not be lifted within the next week.

On 17 April, Public Health Wales reported, for the first time, the areas where the deaths in Wales (to date, 506) had occurred. Almost all were in southeast Wales, with 12 deaths shared between the other health board areas covering west, mid and north Wales. It was later discovered that there had been a delay in reporting the figures from the Betsi Cadwaladr University Health Board. Mark Drakeford announced that "lockdown could stay in Wales even if it was lifted elsewhere in the UK".

On 8 May, First Minister Mark Drakeford announced that the COVID-19 lockdown in Wales would be extended for a further three weeks. He also announced "modest" changes to the measures already in force: some garden centres would be allowed to re-open, and people could now exercise outdoors more than once per day provided that they "stay[ed] local".

On 10 May, Prime Minister Johnson announced lockdown-easing measures on UK television, without mentioning that the measures were only relevant to England. The first ministers of Scotland, Northern Ireland, and Wales said they would not be adopting his new "Stay alert" slogan (as opposed to "Stay home"). The Welsh Government Counsel General for Wales, Jeremy Miles, said exercise must be local to home and visitors could be fined if they drove into Wales for leisure.

=== Easing of restrictions (1 June – 7 September) ===
On 3 June, briefings began (later referred to as 'press conferences') in a series that was set up by Welsh Government as a way of dispersing new information to the people of Wales regarding the COVID-19 pandemic in Wales.

On 12 June, the First Minister Mark Drakeford stated that the R number for Wales was the lowest of any part of the United Kingdom, at 0.7. Ceredigion had the lowest rates of people infected with or dying from COVID-19 in the British mainland, up to June 2020. The area is naturally rural and holiday attractions and the university were closed down very early. The county council set up its own contact tracing system in March 2020.

On 6 July, there were no confirmed deaths in Wales for the first time since the pandemic started.

On 10 July, for the second time, Wales confirmed no deaths. First Minister Mark Drakeford announced changes to the lockdown restrictions and specified dates for the reopening of hospitality businesses, hair and beauty salons, and outdoor leisure facilities. He stated that Frank Atherton, the chief medical officer for Wales, had "confirmed we have some capacity to ease the restrictions further over the next three weeks".

On 17 July, the First Minister announced that the Wales daily briefings would end and instead take place every week.

By 21 July, Wales was recording no new deaths for the eighth time in a month. However, figures released by the Care Inspectorate Wales confirmed that there had been 736 care home resident deaths linked to COVID-19 by 17 July, with the overall number of deaths 71% higher than in the same period last year.

On 25 July, Wales recorded no deaths for the tenth time in a month. On 27 July, it was announced that the R number for Wales was again the lowest of any part of the United Kingdom, between 0.6 and 0.8. By 18 August, the number of people still in hospitalized with COVID-19 was 70.

Restrictions were further eased by an announcement on 31 July, confirming that pubs and restaurants would be able to open indoor areas on 3 August. Up to thirty people would be able to meet outdoors and children under 11 would no longer have to keep a two-metre distance from anyone. Indoor bowling alleys, auction houses and bingo halls were allowed to reopen, while swimming pools, gyms, leisure centres and indoor play areas would be allowed to reopen from 10 August, all with social distancing.

Towards the end of August, concerns grew about a potential second spike in infections, after passengers arriving at Cardiff Airport from overseas tested positive for the virus. The flight operator, TUI Group, was criticised for failing to enforce mask-wearing during the flight. Health Minister Vaughan Gething later revealed that 30 cases had been linked to four flights into the UK from the island of Zakynthos, and the Welsh and Scottish governments lobbied the UK government to have the island included in the list of quarantine destinations for the UK as a whole.

=== Reversal of easing of restrictions (7 September – 19 October) ===
On 7 September 2020, the Welsh Government announced that from 6pm the following day Caerphilly County would be placed back in lockdown. It was the first local lockdown in Wales, and followed the discovery that 98 people had tested positive in a week, giving the county the highest infection rate in Wales. On 11 September 2020, the Welsh government announced that tighter restrictions would be back in force from Monday 14 September, with face coverings being mandatory for indoor places and social gatherings cut from 30 to 6 people until further notice. On 16 September 2020, Rhondda Cynon Taf became the second place in Wales to have a local lockdown due to a spike in cases. Health minister Vaughan Gething drew attention to some specific cases of flouting of the guidelines, including a coach trip to Doncaster made by a group from Abercynon, which was said to be associated with one of the clusters of cases in RCT, saying "This wasn't a group of young people – it's entirely possible for people in their forties and fifties to behave irresponsibly, and we've seen a significant spread from that event". Members of the club protested that they had not gone to the racecourse but had instead visited local pubs. It was later confirmed that one member of the club had tested positive for COVID-19 and the club had closed a few days before the trip because several members of staff had been taken ill.

In the middle of September the British Prime Minister Boris Johnson admitted that the UK was seeing a second wave of COVID-19 cases. On 25 September 2020, the Welsh Government announced that the cities of Cardiff and Swansea, and the town of Llanelli (part of Carmarthenshire) would go into local lockdowns in the next two days, joining Caerphilly, Newport, Bridgend, Merthyr, Blaenau Gwent and Rhondda Cynon Taf. From 28 September, Torfaen, Neath Port Talbot and the Vale of Glamorgan were placed under the same restrictions. On 10 October, the city of Bangor in Gwynedd was placed in a local lockdown.

Welsh government press conference on 19 October 2020 announcing the firebreak lockdown

=== Circuit breaker (23 October – 9 November) ===
Mark Drakeford discusses travel restrictions between Wales and the rest of the UK on 2 November 2020

On 19 October, the Welsh Government announced that a second national lockdown, described as a "fire-break", would be imposed from 23 October until 9 November, coinciding with school half-term holidays which would be extended by a week in colleges and for school students in year 9 (13 to 14 years old) and above, in the hope of bringing down the number of COVID-19 cases. The First Minister announced that all pubs, restaurants, and non-essential shops would be closed during that period. Halloween and bonfire celebrations would not take place in the traditional way, because no indoor or outdoor gatherings with people from other households would be possible, but alternative ways to celebrate would be suggested by the government in due course.

The decision to forbid supermarkets from selling non-essential goods (such as clothing) during the circuit break lockdown caused a certain degree of controversy and confusion. Drakeford argued that the measures were "a simple matter of fair play" expanding that "We are requiring many hundreds of small businesses to close on the high street right across Wales, We cannot do that and then allow supermarkets to sell goods that those people are unable to sell". The leader of Welsh Conservatives, Paul Davies, described them as "madness", "overreaching" and "devastating economically".

Mark Drakeford, Welsh Government's First Minister's message to the nation, as the firebreak nears its end

Following the end of the circuit-breaker, Vaughan Gething claimed that there were "many promising signs" and an overall downward trend in most areas, but also warned the public against "going back to normal".

=== Post-circuit breaker (9 November – 15 December) ===
After the firebreak, rules were standardised across Wales, with localised restrictions abolished. From 9 November, pubs, restaurants and cafes reopened with groups of up to four people (children under eleven not counting in the total) from different households allowed to meet up in them; the 10 pm curfew for alcohol sales remained in place. Non-essential shops also reopened. Two households could form a bubble (interact when they wished) whilst any number of children under eleven and up to 15 or 30 individuals over that age could take part in indoor and outdoor organised events respectively. Travel restrictions within Wales were lifted, though non-essential visits to other parts of the UK or abroad remained banned.

Multiple changes to the restrictions came into force on 3 December. Travel was allowed between Wales and areas in lower tiers of England and Scotland's regional lockdown systems. However, hospitality businesses were forbidden from selling alcohol or providing eat-in catering after 6 pm.

There was a drop in cases, from 206.2 per 100,000 people to 170.6, following the firebreak lockdown, but by early December they had risen to 403.8 per 100,000 people. First Minister Mark Drakeford expressed grave concern and warned that further restrictions might be necessary before Christmas.

=== Christmas and New Year (16 December – 19 February 2021) ===
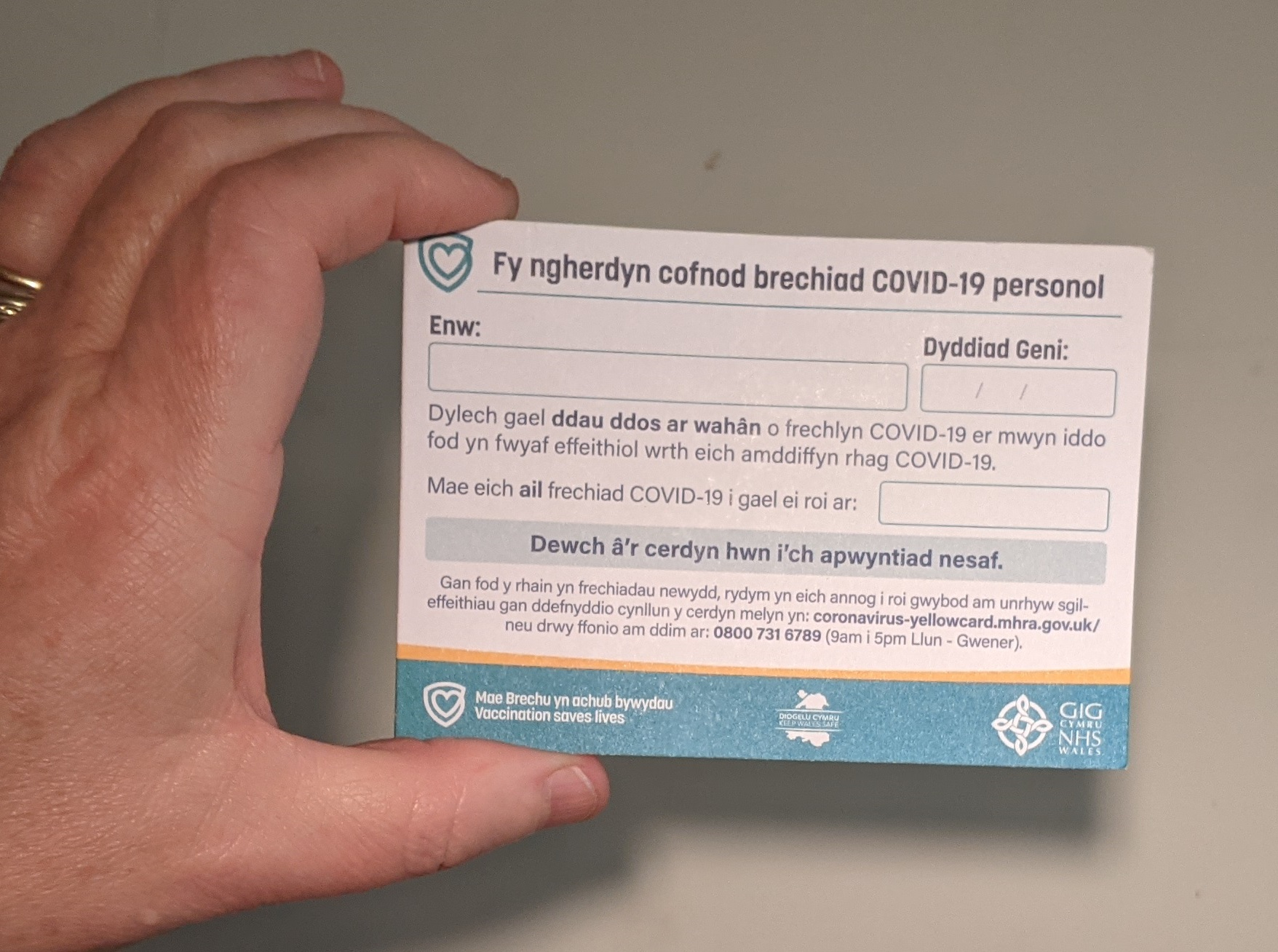
NHS Wales COVID-19 Vaccination card (Welsh language version)

On 16 December, the First Minister announced that after a period of cases rising rather than falling, only two households would be able to form bubbles (instead of the original idea of three) for the Christmas period. He also announced that after the five day relaxation, the whole of Wales would be entering the highest level of restrictions from 28 December and be reviewed every three weeks.

On 19 December, the First Minister announced that the whole of Wales would enter tier-4 restrictions. This included an ongoing national lockdown from that evening. This followed an outbreak of a mutant strain of COVID-19 in the United Kingdom. Original joint plans of relaxed restrictions from 23 to 28 December were in place for the entire United Kingdom, but this was amended so that the sole relaxed period would consist of Christmas Day, in which only two households were to be allowed to meet. Before and after Christmas Day, meeting with people from different households would not be allowed to take place indoors. Those that did meet with other households outdoors had to stay at least two metres apart from each other and wear PPE.

=== Easing of restrictions (20 February – September) ===
The First Minister appeared in a government video message with the legendary Welsh rugby player Gareth Edwards in which Edwards encouraged people to get the COVID-19 vaccine offered by the Welsh Government

On 18 June 2021, the First Minister announced the pausing of relaxations due to the SARS-CoV-2 Delta variant spreading across Wales, also saying that the country was at the start of a third wave of infections.

On 6 August 2021, the First Minister announced that most of the remaining restrictions which had been placed in Wales since the first lockdown in March 2020, would be eased, with nightclubs opening the next day (making it the first time in 17 months they could trade), but that face coverings in all public places would still be mandatory.

=== Vaccine passports and Omicron (October – January) ===
In October 2021, Welsh Government introduced the COVID-19 Pass as a measure to help to "keep Wales safe and open during the pandemic". From 11 October 2021, it's became compulsory for people over the age of 18 to present a COVID-19 Pass, recent negative LFT or PCR test at the licensed premises, clubs and large events. On 9 November 2021, Senedd members voted to expand the current COVID-19 pass scheme to include cinemas and theatres.

In November 2021 the Welsh Government raised concern for the new SARS-CoV-2 variant, Omicron, with them asking all secondary school pupils to wear masks in classrooms. In addition all this the government increased the booster vaccine to all adults, with everyone having to self isolate if they become in contact with someone who has been infected with the Omicron variant.

Restrictions were tightened on Boxing day. These included a cap of six on people meeting in certain recreational facilities, a maximum of 50 at outdoor events and 20 indoors. Required two metre social distancing in offices and public places. Nightclubs also needed to close.

=== Restrictions and mass testing ending (January – June) ===
On 14 January, the Welsh Government set out a plan to relax restrictions on the condition that COVID-19 cases kept on falling. The plan stated that...

- Saturday 16 January: Numbers allowed to attend an outdoor event would rise from 50 to 500
- Friday 21 January: Crowds allowed to return to sporting events and no limits on those attending outdoor events
- Friday 28 January: Nightclubs could reopen and hospitality allowed to operate normally, although COVID-19 passes would still be required for large events, plus cinemas, nightclubs and theatres. Working from home no longer a legal requirement

Mandatory COVID passes concluded in Wales on 18 February for various venues. A few days later, Economy minister Vaughan Gething responded to plans to end all restrictions in England by saying that similar changes could be considered in Wales next month.

On 4 March, 28 March was announced to be the end date of all remaining COVID-19 related legal restrictions in Wales. Though this was later amended with masks remaining a legal requirement in health and social care settings. On the same day, access to PCR (lab-processed) tests was ended for the general public and free LTR tests were restricted to individuals displaying symptoms. Rules requiring workplaces in Wales take COVID-19 related precautions concluded on 18 April. At the end of June, free mass testing was initially planned be completely ended along with contact tracing and financial support for the self isolating. However, the former was ultimately delayed a month to the end of July.

== Government response ==
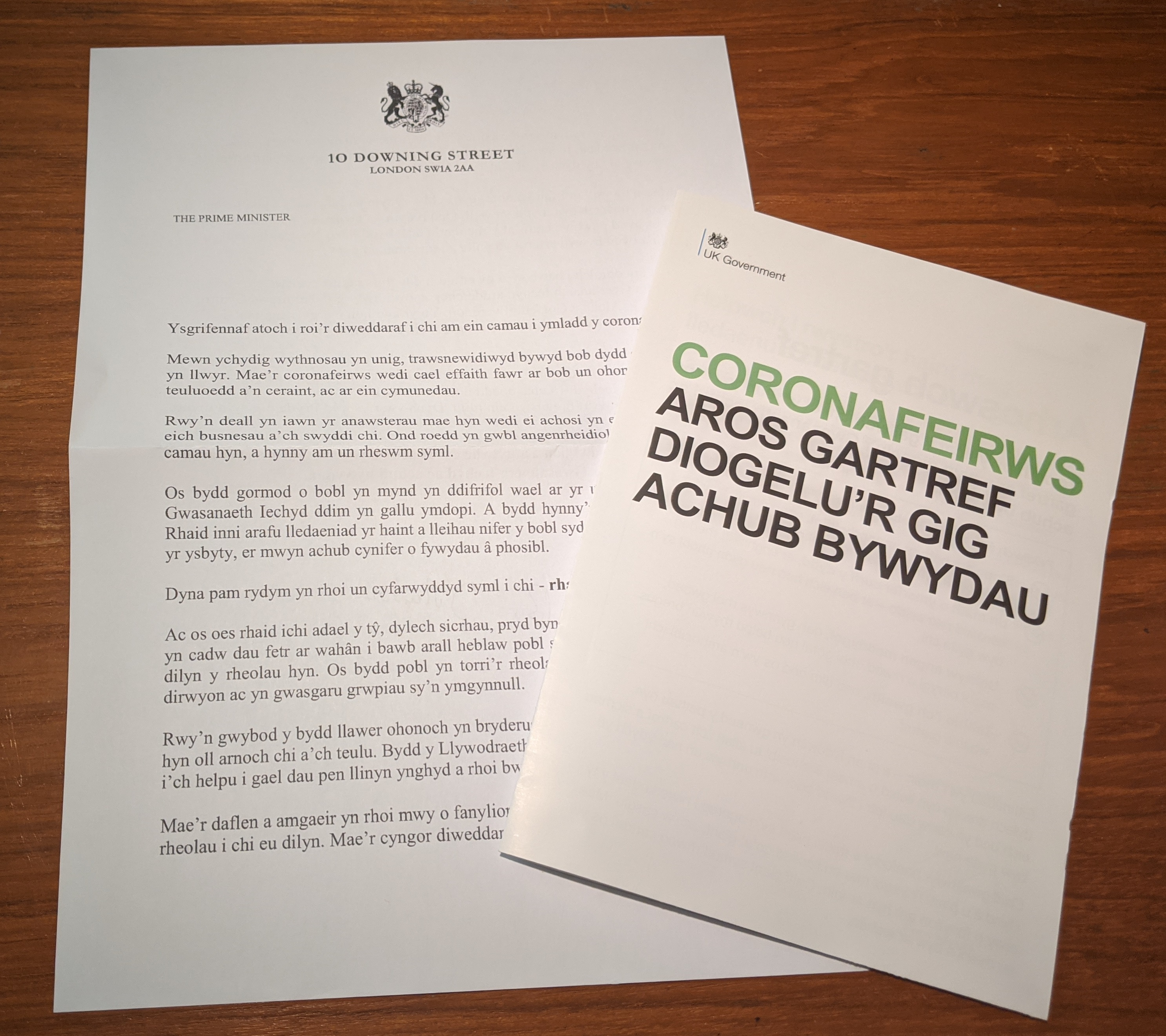
The UK government's letter sent to every household (Welsh language version)

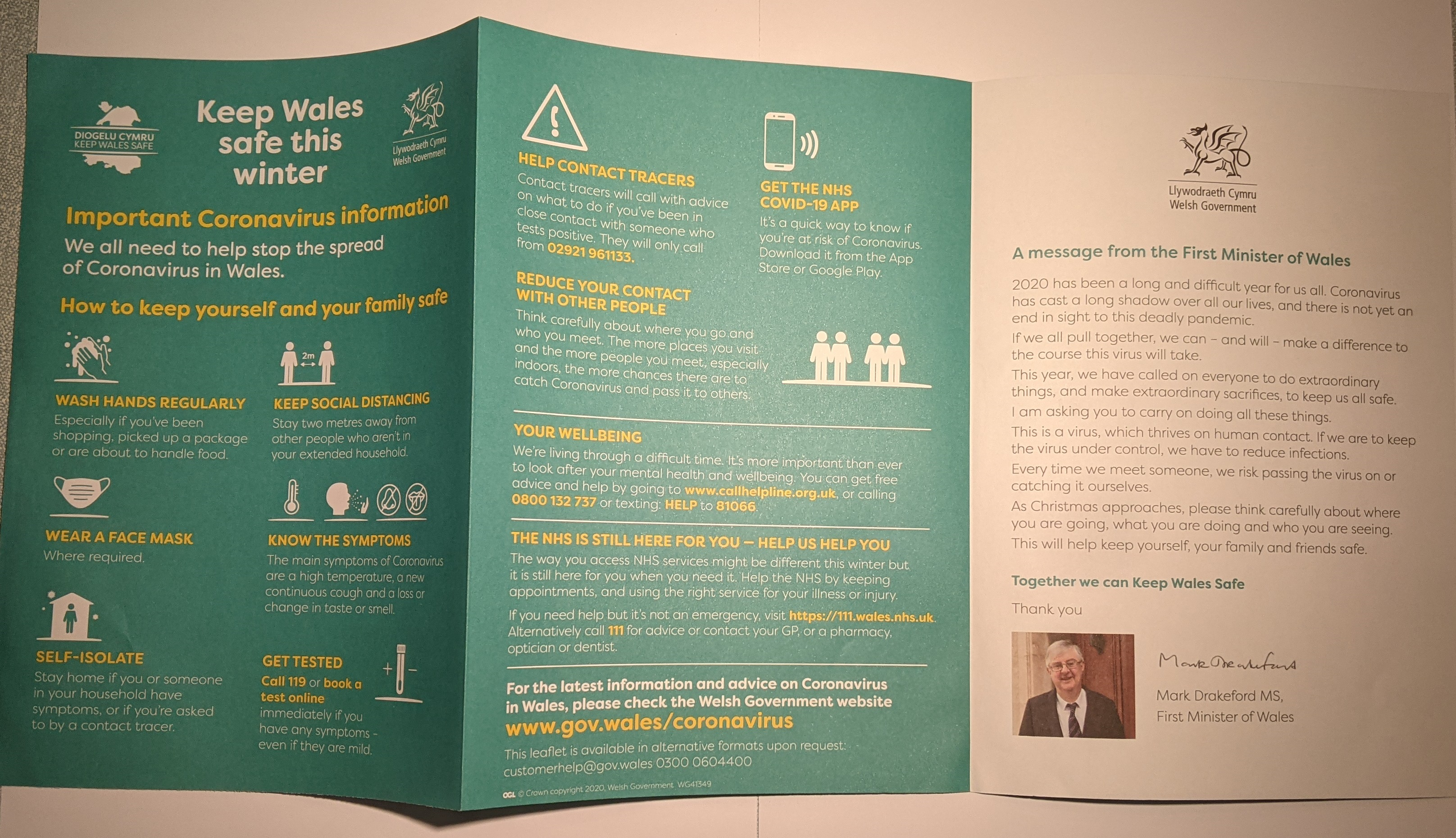
Mark Drakeford's COVID-19 winter letter

The measures put in place restrict people from leaving their home for non-essential travel, with outside exercise limited to once a day. The measures that controlled exercise outside the home differed from those in England, where the measures in place did not stipulate a once-a-day restriction, whereas the Welsh version specifically limited exercise outside the home to once a day, with the maximum fine being £120, compared to £960 in England. Gatherings of two or more people, except individuals in the same household, were banned, whilst pubs, restaurants (with exception for take-aways) and shops selling 'non-essential goods' were ordered to closed.

A COVID-19 medical ventilator designed by Rhys Thomas, a consultant anaesthetist at Glangwili General Hospital in Carmarthen, Wales was given the go-ahead by the Welsh Government. The machine, designed in a few days, was used successfully on a patient in mid-March, and subsequently funded by the Welsh Government to develop further in order to clean the room of viral particles and only supply purified air to the patient.

On 18 March, the Welsh Government announced that all schools in Wales would be closing by 20 March. With a limited number of schools remaining open to provide support for key workers and children with additional needs. It was further announced in the following days that all exams, including GCSEs and A-Levels, would be cancelled, with grades being based on existing work and predicted grades.

Mark Drakeford, First Minister, announced that the Welsh Government has opened discussions with the army about helping the NHS in Wales including training soldiers to support the Welsh Ambulance Service and assisting with non-clinical activities. The Army also set up and ran some of the temporary hospitals across Wales.

Test, Trace, Protect advise from the Welsh Government

On 21 May 2020 the Welsh Government announced that one of the new antibody blood tests for the SARS-CoV-2 virus was being produced by Ortho Clinical Diagnostics (OCD) at Pencoed, Wales, in partnership with Public Health Wales. The test would be rolled out, prioritised and managed and would also be available in care homes. According to Health Minister Vaughan Gething, this test was an important part of the "Test, Trace, Protect" strategy which would help Wales come out of lockdown.

NHS and social care staff in Wales were given two bonus payments of £500 each in May 2020 and April 2021 in recognition of their work during the pandemic. Vaughan Gething announced a £100 million plan in March 2021 which was to establish a "route map to a modern and agile social care sector".

=== Transition to endemic management ===
On 4 March 2022, the Welsh government announced the forthcoming removal of all remaining COVID-19 restrictions on 28 March. The decision was made as part of a long-term plan to transition from pandemic to endemic.

== Healthcare response ==
=== Hospital capacity ===
In 2018–19 there were around 10,563 beds available in hospitals within Wales. As of 7 April 2020 Wales had 369 critical care beds, with plans in place to increase capacity further. In early April 2020, there were 415 ventilators currently in Welsh hospitals, with a further 1,035 ordered.

=== Temporary hospitals ===
On 27 March 2020, it was announced that the Principality Stadium in Cardiff was to be used as a temporary hospital for up to 2,000 beds. Each health board in Wales later announced that they were increasing the number of beds available in their current hospitals and, with the exception of Powys Teaching Health Board, would be opening a total of 16 temporary hospitals in available spaces. In Powys, a further three special 'field hospital' facilities were set up – at the Brecon War Memorial Hospital, in Llandrindod Wells County War Memorial Hospital and at the Victoria Memorial Hospital, Welshpool – and beds were designated for the treatment of COVID-19 patients at community hospitals and health and care centres in Bronllys, Builth Wells, Knighton, Llanidloes, Machynlleth, Newtown and Ystradgynlais. Powys also had arrangements with neighbouring boards for access to beds in case of need.

On 9 April it was announced that the temporary hospital to be located in the Principality Stadium would be called Dragon's Heart Hospital and would be the largest hospital in Wales and the second largest in the United Kingdom. On 14 September it was announced that the hospital would be decommissioned and replaced by a smaller temporary hospital with 400 beds, to be located close to the University Hospital of Wales. The same announcement explained that the 19 'field hospitals' would be reduced to 10 to be retained over the coming winter period.

Location of field hospitals
Local health board	Location	Status after Sept	Number of beds
Aneurin Bevan	Grange University Hospital, Cwmbran	Open	350
Betsi Cadwaladr	Venue Cymru, Llandudno	Retain	350
Betsi Cadwaladr	Brailsford Centre, Bangor University	Retain	250
Betsi Cadwaladr	Ysbyty Enfys Deeside, Deeside Leisure Centre, Flintshire	Retain	250
Betsi Cadwaladr	Glan Clwyd Hospital, Bodelwyddan, Denbighshire		80
Cardiff and Vale	Dragon's Heart Hospital (Millennium Stadium, Cardiff) -facility to move to near University Hospital of Wales	move; new site	2,000 / 400
Cwm Taf Morgannwg	The Vale Resort, Vale of Glamorgan		290
Cwm Taf Morgannwg	Rhondda Cynon Taf council's Ty Trevithick offices, Abercynon		150
Cwm Taf Morgannwg	Harman Becker unit, Bridgend Industrial Estate	Retain	400
Hywel Dda	'y Barn', Parc y Scarlets, Llanelli;	Retain	350
Hywel Dda	Selwyn Samuel Centre, Llanelli	Open	
Hywel Dda	Bluestone National Park Resort, Pembrokeshire	Open	144
Hywel Dda	Plascrug Leisure Centre, Aberystwyth	Retain	
Hywel Dda	Ysbyty Enfys Aberteifi, Cardigan Leisure Centre, Cardigan	Retain	48
Powys Teaching Health Board	Modifications at Brecon War Memorial Hospital		
Powys Teaching Health Board	Modifications at Llandrindod Wells County War Memorial Hospital		
Powys Teaching Health Board	Modifications at Victoria Memorial Hospital, Welshpool		
Swansea Bay	Llandarcy Academy of Sport, Neath (subsequently closed, transfer equipment to Bay Studios)	closed, transfer to Bay Studios	1,340
Swansea Bay	Bay Studios, Swansea	Retain	1,340

=== Vaccination programme ===
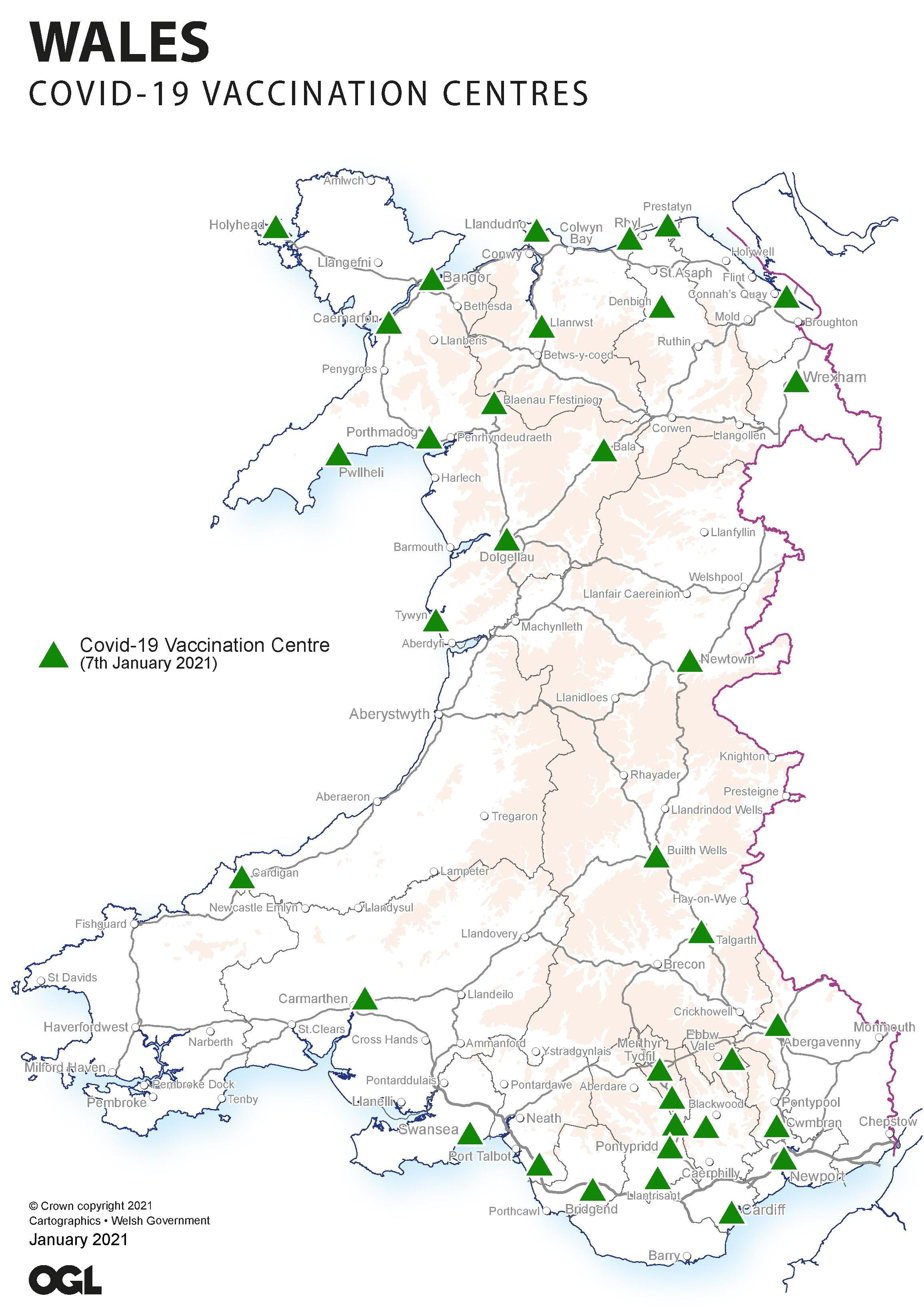
Vaccination centres on the 7 January 2021

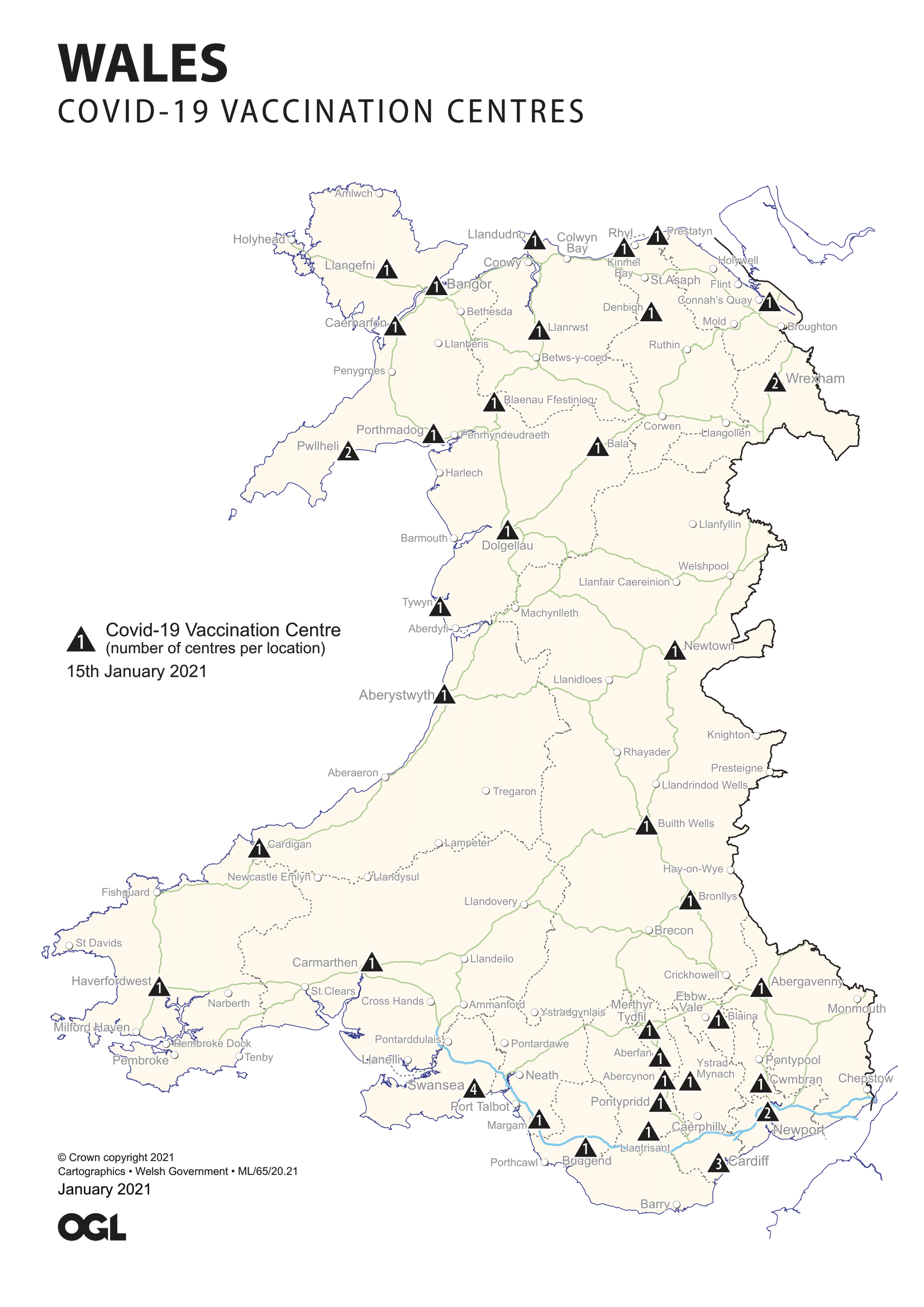
Vaccination centres on the 15 January 2021

On 8 December 2020, the first people in Wales began getting vaccinated with the Pfizer-BioNTech COVID-19 vaccine. Among the first was Craig Atkins, a 48-year-old care home worker, in Cwmbran's vaccine site.

In mid-January it was announced that a total of 327,000 doses of the two available vaccines had been delivered to the Welsh NHS. Criticism of the rate of progress of the vaccination programme continued, with a reported 86,039 doses having been given by 10 January 2021, compared with a reported 400,000 in the UK as a whole. At 2.7% of the population, progress was slower than that in the other three constituent countries of the UK.

Despite the slower start to the vaccination programme in Wales, the vaccination rate had caught up to England and Scotland's rates by early February 2021. From early April 2021, the percentage of total population given a first dose overtook that of England, Scotland, and Northern Ireland. By late May 2021, the Welsh vaccination rate was leading both the UK and the world, as a higher proportion of the Welsh population had received a first dose of a COVID vaccine than any other country with a population of more than a million people.

From early March 2021, due to the acceleration of first doses, and a drop in vaccine supply, the Welsh Government changed focus from administering first doses to prioritising second doses. This led to Wales leading the UK in delivering second doses. Wales fell behind in administering second doses between May and June 2021, but again overtook the rest of the UK from late June 2021.

In mid June 2021, the Welsh Government confirmed that all eligible adults in Wales had been offered a first dose of a COVID-19 vaccine, six weeks ahead of the target date of 31 July 2021.

== Research and innovation ==
A COVID-19 medical ventilator designed by Rhys Thomas, a consultant anaesthetist at Glangwili General Hospital in Carmarthen, Wales was given the go-ahead by the Welsh Government. The machine, designed in a few days, was used successfully on a patient in mid-March, and subsequently funded by the Welsh Government to develop further in order to clean the room of viral particles and only supply purified air to the patient. In early April it was approved by the Medicines and Healthcare products Regulatory Agency, and on 12 April the ventilator, designed and built in Wales, was also approved by the UK Government. It is being produced by CR Clarke & Co in Betws, near Ammanford. The idea was suggested by Plaid Cymru leader Adam Price who challenged Thomas to come up with a simpler and more effective ventilator.

== Supply chain issues ==
On 10 April the UK Government sent out a document to PPE suppliers informing them that suppliers of certain medical equipment, including protective masks, gloves and aprons, must be registered with the Care Quality Commission, which regulates all health and social care services in England only. There was not a similar agreement in place between suppliers and Care Inspectorate Wales or the Care Inspectorate of Scotland. The Welsh Government advised care home providers that they should order through their local council, while Plaid Cymru leader Adam Price lodged a formal complaint with the European Union over the issue. The manager of two care homes in Gwynedd, Wales was told by two suppliers that they would only sell to care homes in England. The chief executive of the care home umbrella group Scottish Care said that the UK's four largest PPE suppliers had said they were not distributing to Scotland because their priority was going to be "England, the English NHS and then English social care providers". The UK government reported that it had not instructed any company to prioritise PPE for any nation. Healthcare supplier Gompels' website said at the time that "These restrictions are not something we have decided, they are a criteria [sic] given to us by Public Health England".

== Impact ==
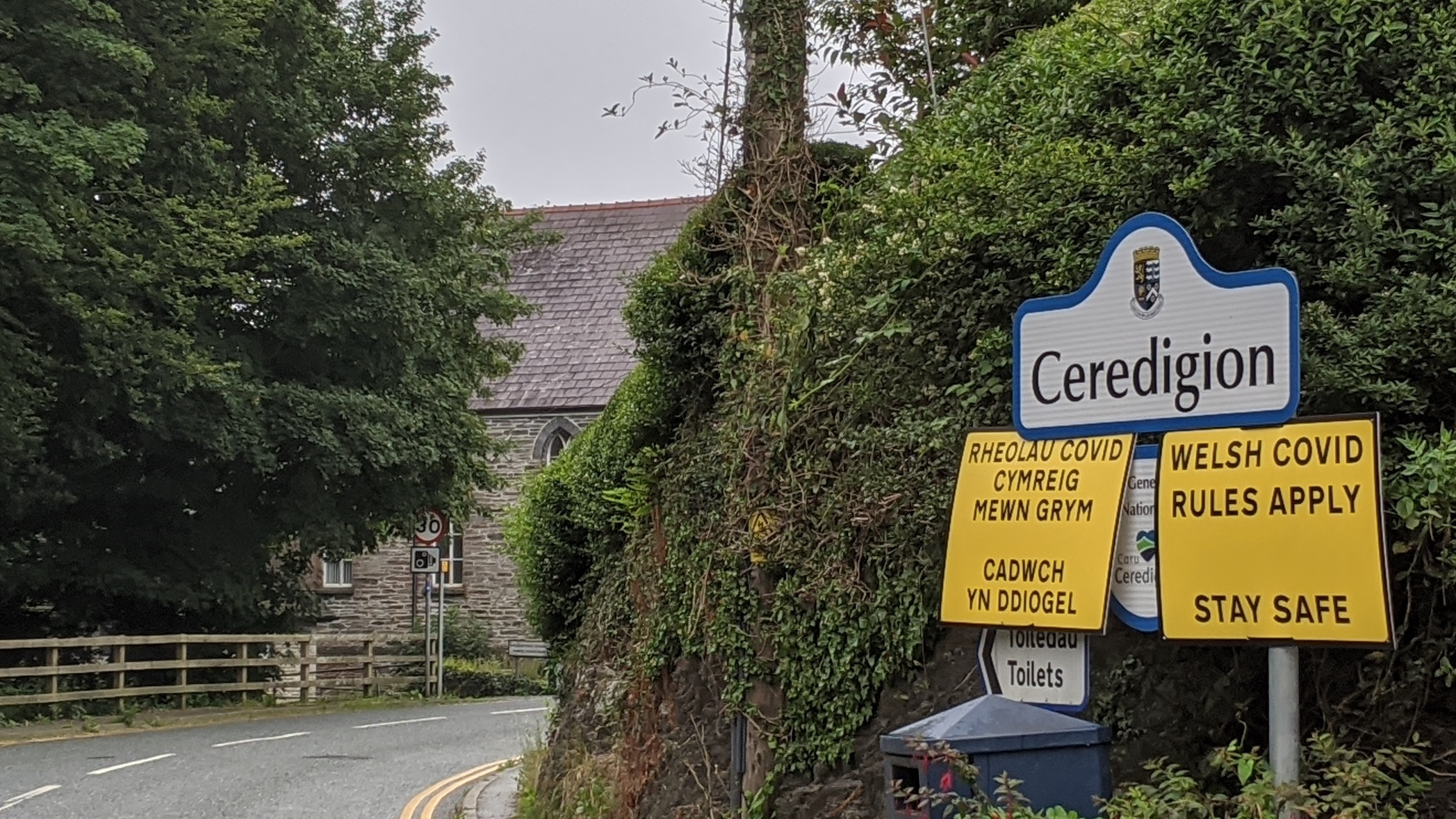
COVID regulation signs in Cenarth, Ceredigion

=== Airports ===
The Welsh Government also announced that it would provide financial assistance to state-owned Cardiff Airport, to maintain solvency during reduced operations.

=== "At risk" population ===
Letters were sent to over 80,000 people who were deemed to be the 'most vulnerable', advising them to stay indoors for 12 to 16 weeks. The Welsh Government began sending food boxes to the most in need, in order to help them stay in their homes.

On 8 April 2020, it was confirmed that the Welsh Government had shared data of those identified as extremely vulnerable to serious illness as a result of exposure to COVID-19. This was done to help them get priority online food deliveries rather than risk leaving their homes.

=== Businesses ===
On 30 March 2020, a £1.1 billion support package for businesses and public services affected by the pandemic, included a £500 million economy crisis fund, £100 million in loans, and £400 million in emergency funding.

=== Education ===
On 15 March 2020, Bangor University cancelled all lectures with immediate effect, with teaching resuming online on 23 March. Cardiff University and Swansea University also announced that they would be moving towards remote learning and online lectures from 23 March.

On 18 March, the Welsh Government announced that all schools and nurseries in Wales would be closing by 20 March, initially for a period of four weeks, and Education Minister Kirsty Williams said that it would very likely be for a "considerable period of time". A limited number of schools remained open to provide support for key workers and children with additional needs. It was further announced in the following days that all exams, including GCSEs and A-Levels, would be cancelled, with grades being based on existing work and predicted grades.

On 6 April, the Welsh Assembly announced funding for free child care for all children of key workers under five years old.

On 3 June, it was announced that schools in Wales would reopen on 29 June and that the summer term had been extended by one week to 27 July. In addition, the autumn half-term break would be extended by one week.

In July 2021, the Centre for Economic Performance, a research centre at the London School of Economics, published an analysis of educational loss due to school closures. Researchers found that young people in Wales had missed 124 school days. This compares to a full year of 190 classroom days during normal times. In aspects of blended learning, pupils in Wales missed 66 days of school, representing the highest average loss across all UK countries.

On 1 December 2021, Estyn, Wales' schools watchdog, presented a yearly report on the pandemic's significant implications for children's learning. The 147-page report evaluates how schools and other educational and training settings responded to the ongoing pandemic's problems. It reiterates warnings from others, including the Children's Commissioner for Wales, that children and teenagers from low-income families have been disproportionately affected by a lack of support, and that safeguarding referrals increased during lockdowns. According to the report, many children' literacy and numeracy skills deteriorated as a result of disruption to learning during lockdown and self-isolation.

=== Health ===
Chief Medical Officer, Dr Frank Atherton explaining what the relaxation of the rules means over Christmas 2020, for those who were previously shielding.

On 1 April 2020, it was announced that during the pandemic, home abortions would be allowed for women in the first nine weeks of pregnancy, following an online or telephone consultation. This was part of a significant re-structuring of health care services for women in particular.

Virtual GP appointments were also rolled out across Wales, sooner than originally anticipated, allowing for phone consultations, with video consultations also available if needed.

In October 2020, an analysis of progress showed that the number of people waiting for routine surgery had increased to 57,445, approximately six times as many as the same time in 2019. The Royal College of Surgeons requested the Welsh Government to speed up the introduction of "green zones" in Welsh hospitals, so that operations could resume.

=== Politics ===
Plans by the Welsh Government to extend the right to vote to prisoners serving less than four years were shelved, with ministers unable to commit "any official resource" due to the pandemic. Plans to extend the vote and enfranchise 16 and 17 year olds were to continue ahead however.

=== Prisons ===
On 19 March 2020, it was reported that around 75 officers at HMP Berwyn in Wrexham County Borough were off work due to sickness or self-isolation, and 22 prisoners showing symptoms of COVID-19 were being isolated by the prison. The prison had enough staff members to remain fully operational.

On 31 March, three inmates at HMP Swansea had been confirmed as testing positive.

On 4 April it was announced that some low risk prisoners, with two months or less still to serve, would be released on temporary licence. Those released would be electronically tagged. No inmates convicted of COVID-19 offences would be considered for release.

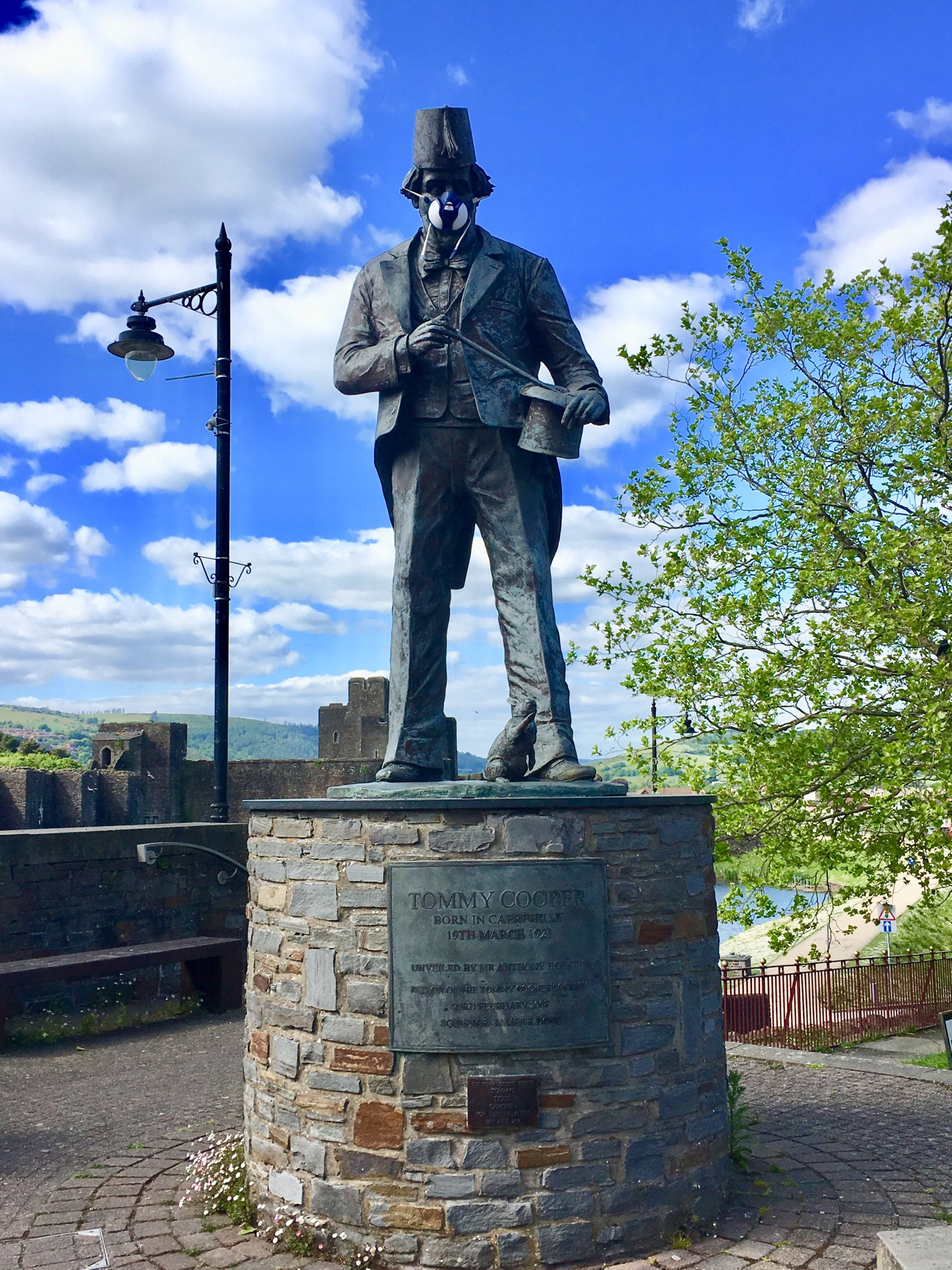
The statue of Tommy Cooper in Caerphilly with a protective mask

=== Religious services ===
The Church in Wales announced the suspension of its public gatherings, including church services, along with the postponement of weddings and baptisms. The Muslim Council of Britain and the Roman Catholic church announced similar moves, with many religious services being streamed online.

=== Sports ===
On 13 March 2020, the Six Nations Wales vs Scotland fixture was postponed for a year.

The Football Association for Wales suspended domestic football matches at all levels in Wales until at least 30 April 2020.

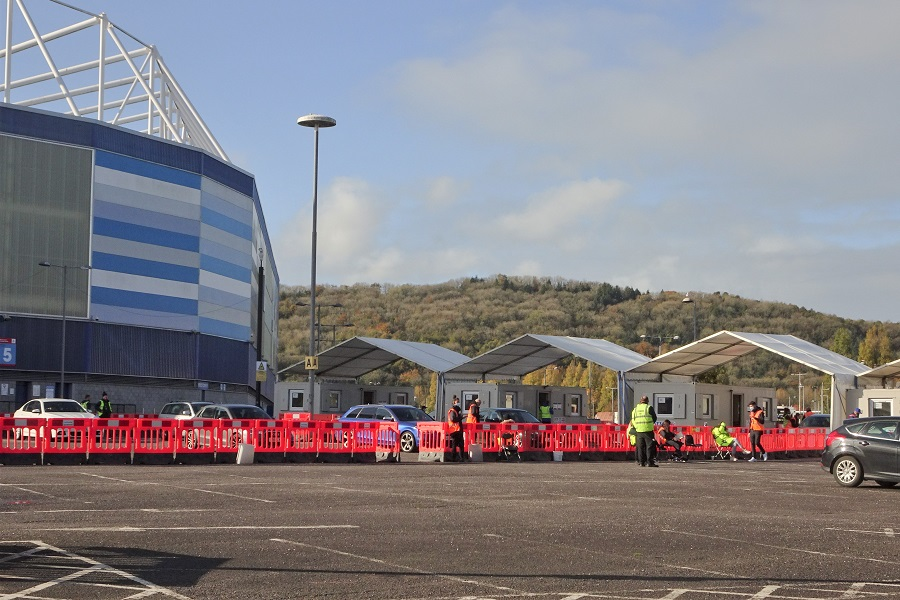
A drive through COVID testing centre at Cardiff City Stadium

=== Supermarkets and shops ===
In March 2020, some supermarkets announced restrictions on the number of items people could buy, with each company setting their own limits. This was seen as a reaction to a large number of members of the public stockpiling food. Stores began implementing social distancing regulations, with many stores attaching tape to the floor to separate people by two metres and limiting the number of people in the store at a time. Many stores installed protective screens on checkouts to help protect workers.

After new regulations were introduced in England and Scotland in July and August obliging shoppers to wear face masks, the Welsh government decided not to impose this restriction on shoppers in Wales. Instead, they recommended the use of face masks "where social distancing is difficult". This resulted in criticism from some scientists. In mid-September, the use of face masks in shops became mandatory in Wales, after Drakeford announced that 20 people in every 100,000 in Wales had COVID-19. Anyone not observing the face covering restrictions could be fined.

After a 'firebreak' lockdown was imposed in late October to control the spread of COVID-19 in Wales, supermarkets were prohibited from selling 'non-essential goods' after many other retailers were forced to close. The policy was the subject of the largest petition ever submitted to the Senedd, leading the government to state that it would review the policy after the first weekend of the firebreak. There were no further restrictions placed on retailers after the end of the firebreak.

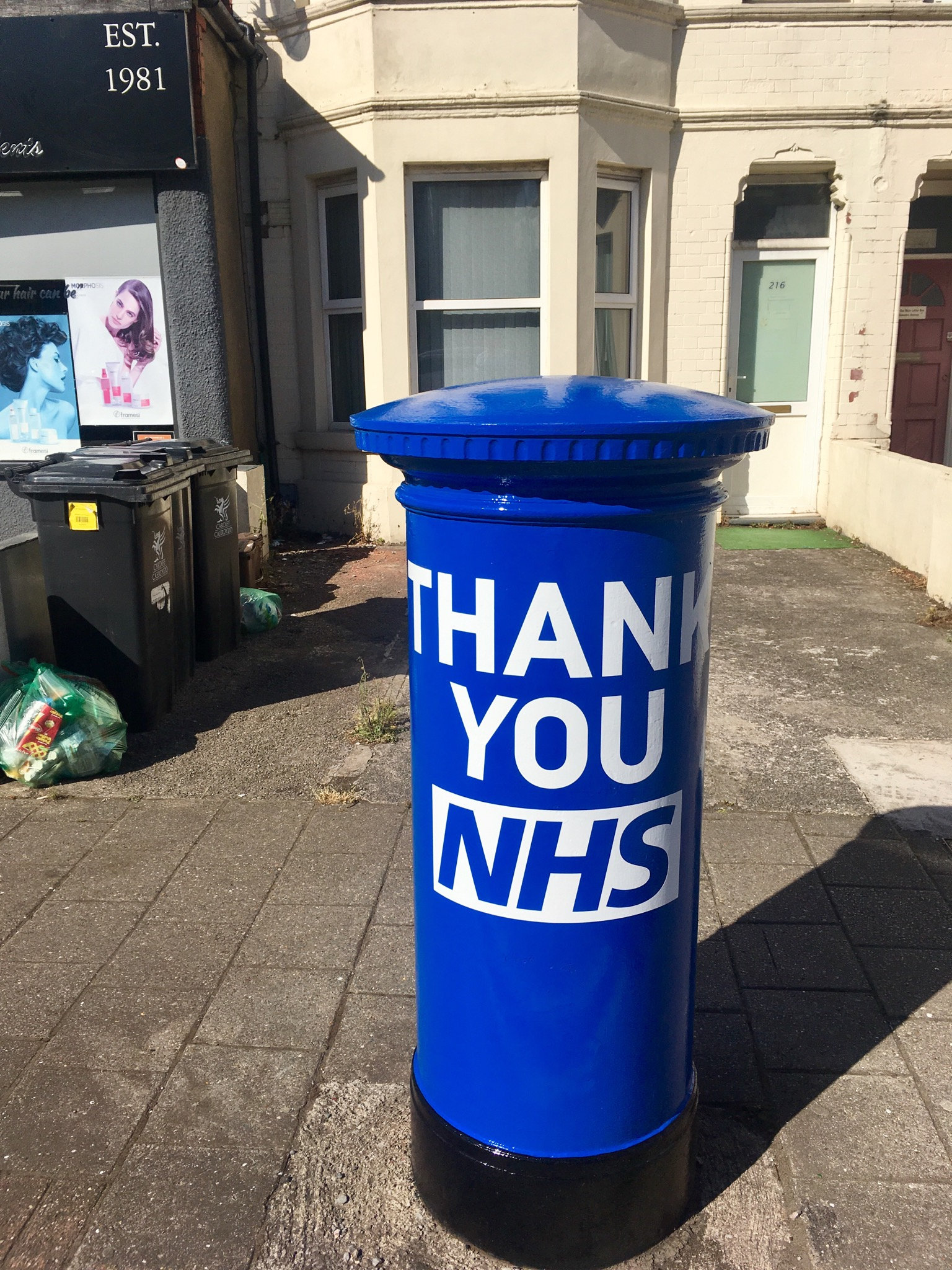
A 'Thank You NHS' blue postbox in Cardiff

== Statistics ==
=== Cases ===
Cumulative confirmed COVID-19 case totals in Wales:

Situation on 1 December 2021
Health board	Local authority	Cases	/100k	Tests	Positive test %
Aneurin Bevan	Blaenau Gwent	12,636	18,087.1	97,638	12.9
Aneurin Bevan	Caerphilly	31,819	17,572.3	230,946	13.8
Aneurin Bevan	Monmouthshire	11,601	12,264.5	104,131	11.1
Aneurin Bevan	Newport	25,697	16,613.4	203,299	12.6
Aneurin Bevan	Torfaen	16,259	17,304.0	119,302	13.6
Betsi Cadwaladr	Anglesey	7,532	10,753.4	78,759	9.6
Betsi Cadwaladr	Conwy	14,218	12,131.1	144,875	9.8
Betsi Cadwaladr	Denbighshire	14,479	15,130.2	129,007	11.2
Betsi Cadwaladr	Flintshire	22,767	14,584.9	174,917	13.0
Betsi Cadwaladr	Gwynedd	14,939	11,993.4	140,801	10.6
Betsi Cadwaladr	Wrexham	22,980	16,902.4	171,050	13.4
Cardiff and Vale	Cardiff	60,649	16,530.0	453,532	13.4
Cardiff and Vale	Vale of Glamorgan	21,865	16,367.6	169,499	12.9
Cwm Taf Morgannwg	Bridgend	24,966	16,978.0	180,392	13.8
Cwm Taf Morgannwg	Merthyr Tydfil	12,390	20,538.4	87,552	14.2
Cwm Taf Morgannwg	Rhondda Cynon Taf	43,821	18,163.1	312,933	14.0
Hywel Dda	Carmarthenshire	27,929	14,795.2	228,670	12.2
Hywel Dda	Ceredigion	6,511	8,956.6	68,027	9.6
Hywel Dda	Pembrokeshire	14,621	11,620.8	132,538	11.0
Powys	Powys	15,021	11,342.2	131,451	11.4
Swansea Bay	Neath Port Talbot	26,992	18,834.0	181,280	14.9
Swansea Bay	Swansea	41,801	16,924.0	293,721	14.2
Location Unknown		3,326		38,991	8.5
Welsh resident outside Wales		18,971		124,619	15.2
Total (1 December)		513,790	16,210.0	3,997,930	12.9

=== Deaths ===
Deaths by local area to 17 April 2020 were published by the Office for National Statistics on 25 April. At this point, deaths had reached 1,016. The figure is higher than that published by Public Health Wales because it included hospitals, care homes, homes, hospices and other settings. This figure may be revised again because a second health board, Hywel Dda, was found to have under-reported 31 deaths in its area.

The table below shows deaths by health board, most of which occurred in hospitals.

Situation on 1 December 2021
Health board	Total deaths	Deaths per 100,000
Aneurin Bevan	1,110	185.6
Betsi Cadwaladr	1,102	156.7
Cardiff and Vale	876	173.6
Cwm Taf Morgannwg	1,731	384.8
Hywel Dda	611	156.8
Powys	83	62.4
Swansea Bay	891	227.9
Location Unknown	N/A	
Welsh resident outside Wales	16	
Total	6,420	202.0

== Graphs ==
=== New cases by date reported ===
Source: coronavirus.data.gov.uk.

The graph above shows new cases by date reported, and not by the specimen date of the positive test. Due to planned maintenance of NHS Wales IT systems, no figures were reported on 13 December, followed by under-reporting of case numbers from Lighthouse laboratories from 14 to 16 December. The backlog of over 11,000 cases was reported on 17 December. No case numbers were reported on 25 December and 1 January.

No Case numbers or deaths were reported on 2 April and 4 April. As of 17 April 2021, Public Health Wales stopped posting the latest figures on Saturdays. As such, these days have been removed from the graphs.

No case numbers or deaths were reported on 11 August due to a technical issue.

On 19 February 2022, Public Health Wales announced that they will be publishing only the figures from Monday to Friday with the weekends figures being added to the weeks totals.

In May 2022, Public Health Wales announced that they will be changing the way they report data from Thursday 26 May daily reporting will end, and a new look weekly dashboard will be published on their website every Thursday at 12pm.

=== ONS excess mortality data ===
The deaths reported by Public Health Wales are only those of hospitalised patients or care home residents where COVID-19 has been confirmed with a positive laboratory test and is thought to have been a causative factor in the death. The Office for National Statistics publishes provisional weekly numbers of deaths of those usually resident in Wales, including cases where COVID-19 has been suspected and mentioned on the death certificate, as well as excess mortality data including deaths due to all causes. As of the week ending 4 December 2020, the ONS reported a provisional total of 3,892 deaths in Wales where COVID-19 was mentioned on the death certificate.

== See also ==
- COVID-19 pandemic in the United Kingdom
- COVID-19 pandemic in England
- COVID-19 pandemic in Northern Ireland
- COVID-19 pandemic in Scotland
