= Ceredigion & Mid Wales NHS Trust =

Former NHS trust in Wales

Ceredigion & Mid Wales NHS Trust (Welsh: Ymddiriedolaeth GIG Ceredigion a Chanolbarth Cymru) was an NHS Trust in Wales. The headquarters of the Trust was based in the Bronglais General Hospital, in Aberystwyth. The Trust catered to the Ceredigion area, as well as large areas of south Gwynedd and north Powys.

It 2007 it was announced that Ceredigion & Mid Wales NHS Trust, Carmarthenshire NHS Trust and Pembrokeshire & Derwen NHS Trust would merge in 2008. The merger occurred as planned on 1 April 2008 with the newly merged trust named Hywel Dda NHS Trust.

== Major hospitals ==
Major hospitals included:

- Aberaeron Hospital
- Bronglais Hospital
- Cardigan and District Community Hospital
- Tregaron Hospital
