= South Pembrokeshire Hospital =

- Hywel Dda University Health Board
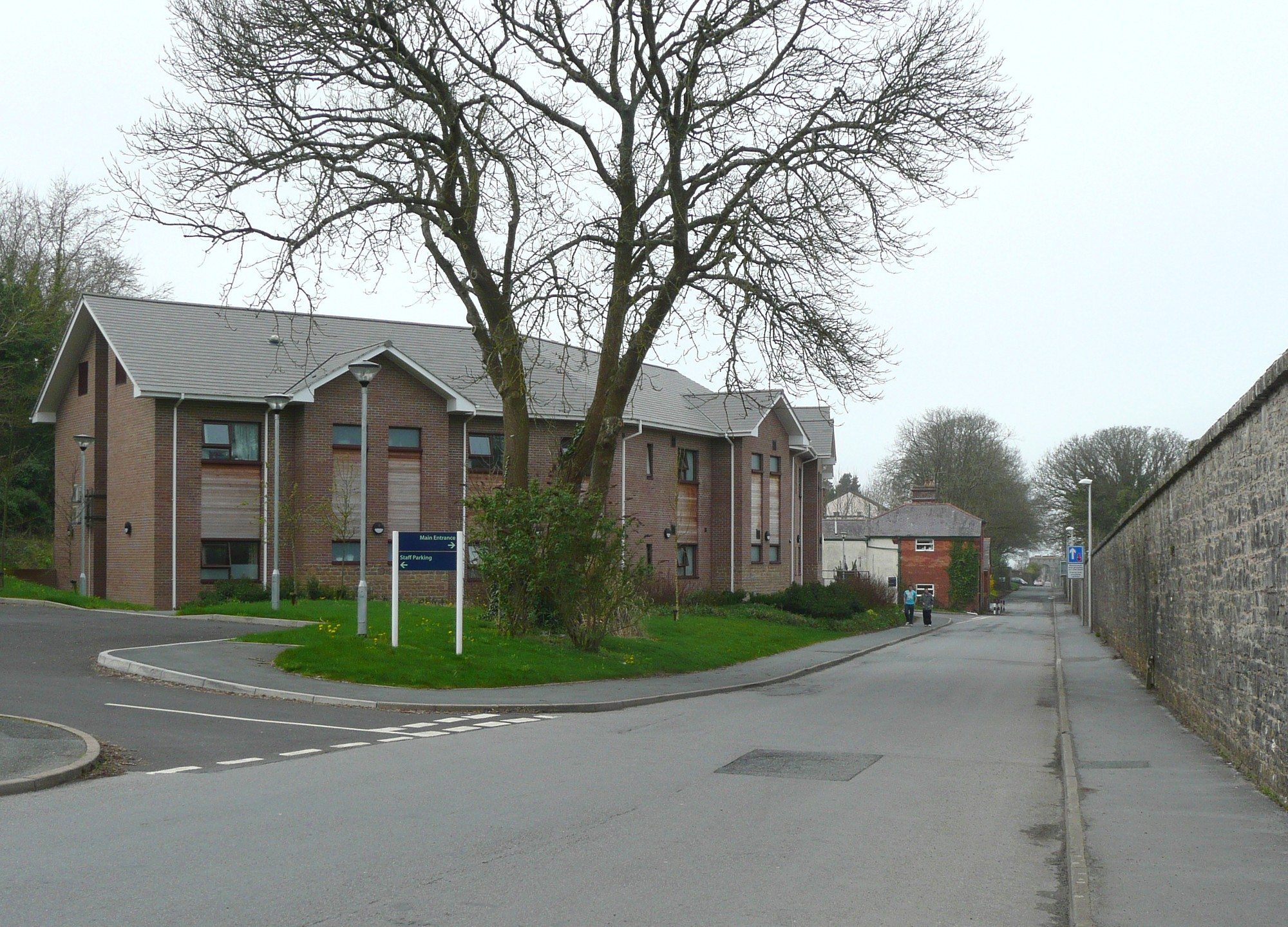
- South Pembrokeshire Hospital (on the left)

- Shown in Pembrokeshire

Geography
- Location: Pembroke Dock, Pembrokeshire, Wales, United Kingdom
- Coordinates: 51.6928°N 4.9565°W

Organisation
- Care system: Public NHS
- Type: Community hospital

History
- Founded: 1902

Links
- Lists: Hospitals in Wales

South Pembrokeshire Hospital (Welsh: Ysbyty De Sir Benfro) is a community hospital in Pembroke Dock, Pembrokeshire, Wales. It is managed by the Hywel Dda University Health Board.

== History ==
The hospital was originally built as a Royal Naval Hospital in 1902 and was expanded by the Royal Air Force during the Second World War. In November 2013, the Minor Injury Unit was closed, and staff relocated to Withybush General Hospital.

== Services ==
The hospital has 35 inpatient beds and five social care beds. It operates various rehabilitation, outpatient services.
