= John Matthews (engineer) =

British agricultural engineer (1930–2025)

John Matthews CBE (4 July 1930 – 11 July 2025) was a British agricultural engineer who was Pro-Chancellor of the University of Luton.

== Career ==
=== Agriculture ===
An agricultural engineer, Matthews joined Great Britain's National Institute of Agricultural Engineering (NIAE) in 1959, He was its Director from 1984 to 1990, during which time it became known as the Agriculture and Food Research Council. He was President of the Institution of Agricultural Engineers 1986–1988.

Matthews' research interests were in the health and safety of agricultural workers, including noise, vibration, posture and mental stress; and also in robotic systems development. While at the Institute, he served as chairman on health and safety issues of the ISO and the Organisation for Economic Co-operation and Development.

Matthews received the Royal Agricultural Society Research Medal in 1983 and several international awards: the Max Eyth Medallion in 1990, Fellow of Accademia dei Georgofili in 1991, and Order of Agricultural Merit (Ordre du Mérite Agricole) in 1992.

Matthews was editor of a book, Progress in Agricultural Physics and Engineering, with each subject chapter contributed by the most prominent person in their field.

=== Higher education ===
From 1989 to 1993, Matthews was Chairman of Governors at Luton College of Higher Education leading up to its achievement of university status in 1993. He then became Pro-Chancellor and Chair of Governors for the University from 1993 to 1998.

Matthews was Non-Executive Director, Ceredigion and Mid Wales NHS Trust from 1993 to 2003 and its Vice Chairman from 2000. He chaired its research and development committee from 1993 to 2003 and its audit committee from 2000 to 2003. He also chaired the All-Wales workshops on 'The Assurance Agenda'.

== Personal life and death ==
Matthews was born in Dunstable, Bedfordshire on 4 July 1930. He died on 11 July 2025, at the age of 95.

== Sources ==
- "Matthews, John", Who's Who 2014, A & C Black, an imprint of Bloomsbury Publishing plc, 2014; online edition, Oxford University Press, November 2014
