= Mynydd Mawr Hospital =

- Hywel Dda University Health Board
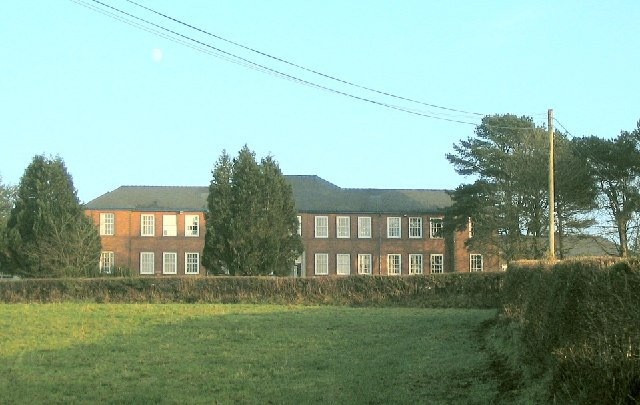
- Mynydd Mawr Hospital

- Shown in Carmarthenshire

Geography
- Location: Llanelli, Wales, United Kingdom
- Coordinates: 51.7720°N 4.1080°W

Organisation
- Care system: NHS Wales
- Type: Community hospital

Services
- Emergency department: No
- Beds: 28

History
- Founded: 1930s
- Closed: 2013

Mynydd Mawr Hospital (Welsh: Ysbyty Mynydd Mawr) was a community hospital at Upper Tumble, Llanelli, Wales. It was managed by the Hywel Dda University Health Board.

== History ==
The hospital was established as the West Wales Isolation Hospital in the 1920s. It joined the National Health Service in 1948 and it was extended in the 1970s. After services transferred to the Prince Philip Hospital in Llanelli, Mynydd Mawr Hospital closed in October 2013.
