= Llanidloes War Memorial Hospital =

- Powys Teaching Health Board
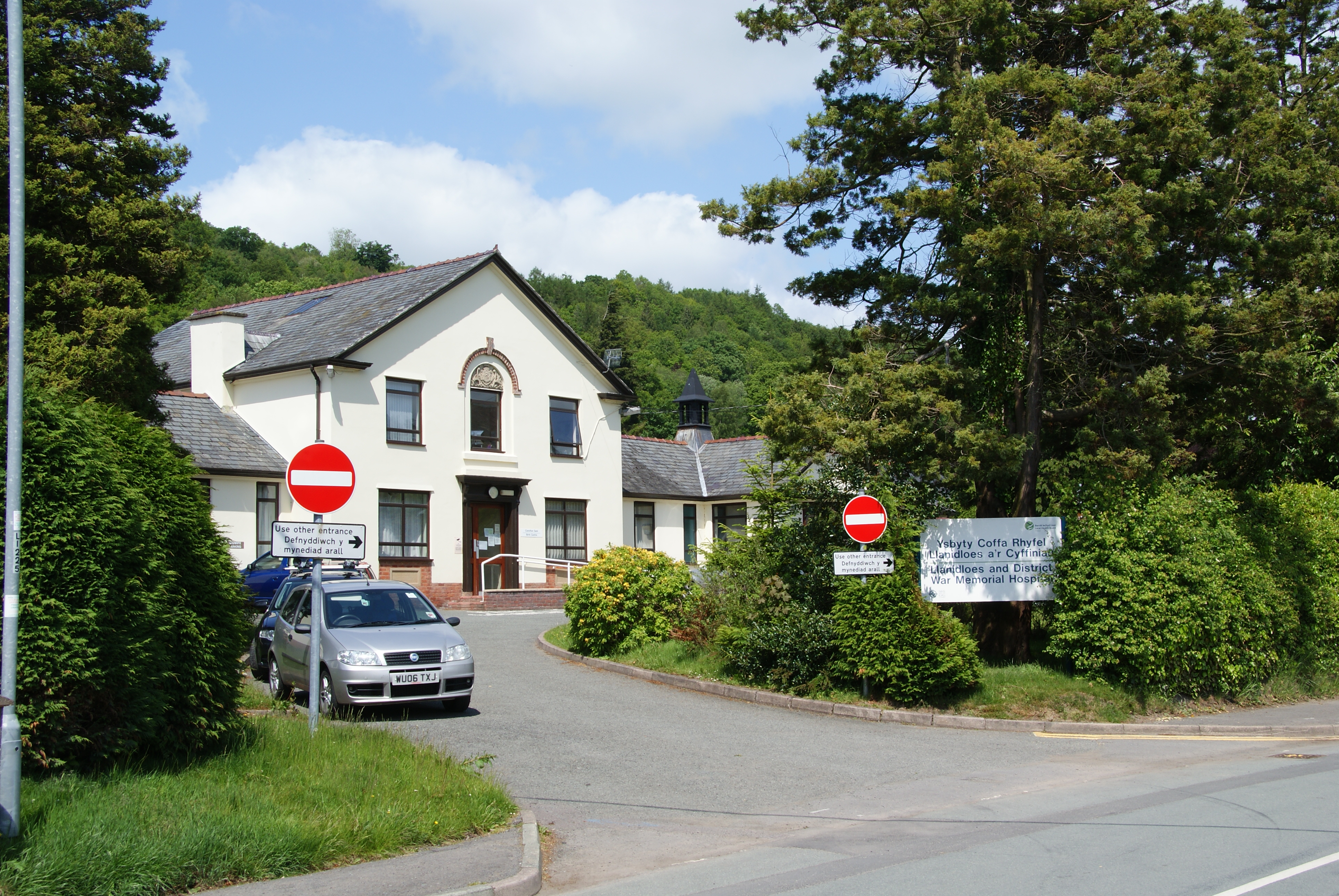
- Llanidloes War Memorial Hospital

- Shown in Powys

Geography
- Location: Eastgate Street, Llanidloes, Powys, Wales
- Coordinates: 52.4526°N 3.5396°W

Organisation
- Care system: NHS Wales
- Type: Community

History
- Founded: 1920

Links
- Lists: Hospitals in Wales

Llanidloes War Memorial Hospital (Welsh: Ysbyty Coffa Rhyfel Llanidloes) is a health facility in Eastgate Street, Llanidloes, Powys, Wales. It is managed by the Powys Teaching Health Board.

== History ==
The facility was commissioned to commemorate the lives of the local service personnel who had died in the First World War and opened as the Llanidloes and District War Memorial Hospital in 1920. During the 1930s funds were raised for the hospital through the annual Rose Queen Carnival in the town. It joined the National Health Service in 1948.

In 2006, the local health board announced that it was planning to make cuts which would result in the downgrading or closure of hospital: the Save Llanidloes Hospital Action Group was formed in response. It has since remained open.
