= Ystradgynlais Community Hospital =

- Powys Teaching Health Board
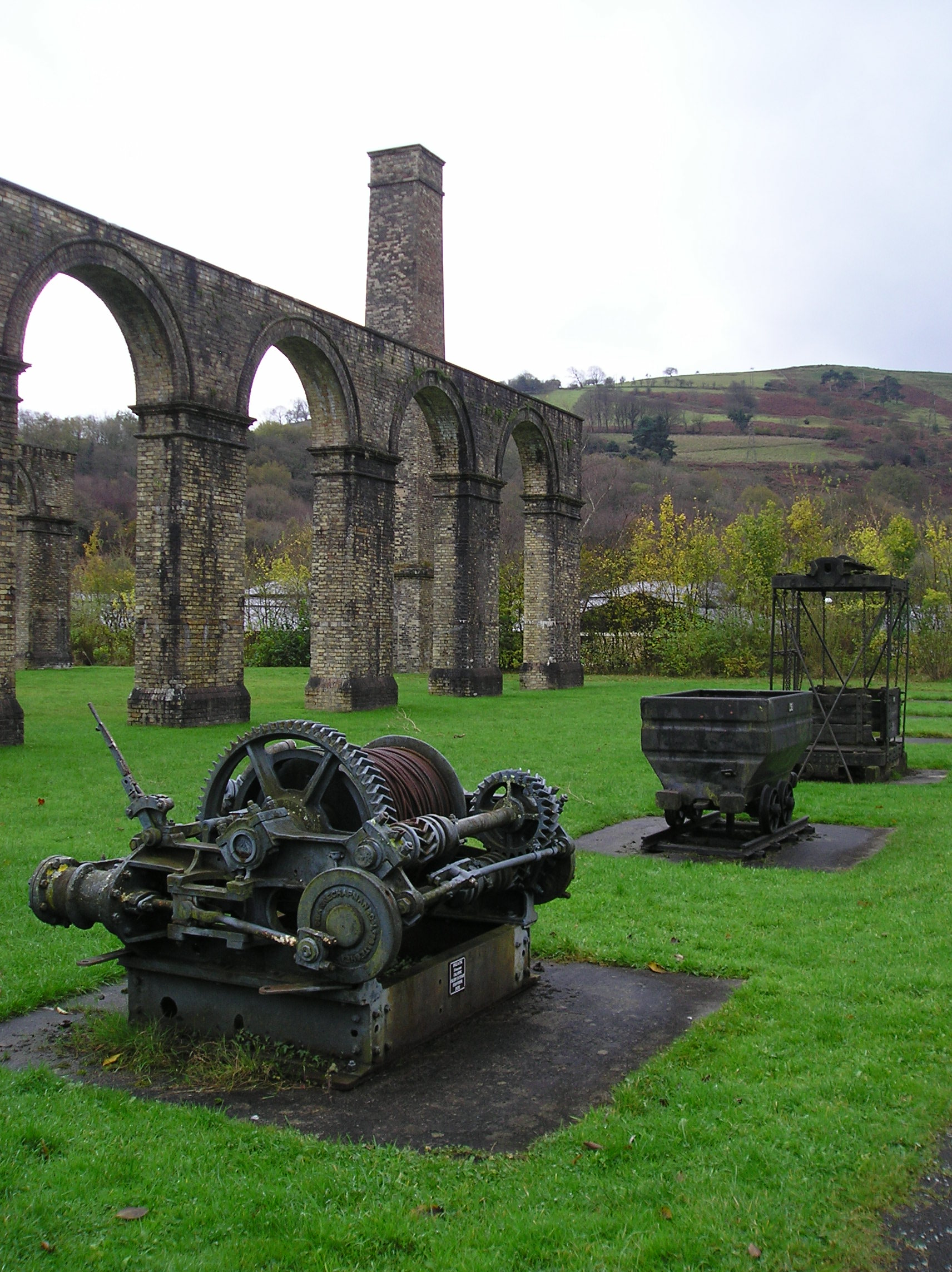
- The hospital, which was built on part of the site of the old Ynyscedwyn Ironworks, is just visible in the background

- Shown in Powys

Geography
- Location: Glanrhyd Road, Ystradgynlais, Powys, Wales
- Coordinates: 51.7671°N 3.7644°W

Organisation
- Care system: NHS Wales
- Type: Community

History
- Founded: 1986

Links
- Lists: Hospitals in Wales

Ystradgynlais Community Hospital (Welsh: Ysbyty Cymunedol Ystradgynlais) is a health facility in Glanrhyd Road, Ystradgynlais, Powys, Wales. It is managed by the Powys Teaching Health Board.

== History ==
The facility was commissioned to replace the aging Craig-y-Nos Hospital. It was designed by Anthony Williams & Partners and built on part of the site of the old Ynyscedwyn Ironworks, opening in January 1986. Modern hydrotherapy facilities were installed at the hospital in 2006.

Welsh Health Common Services Authority won the Gold Medal for Architecture at the National Eisteddfod of Wales of 1988 for their work on the Ystradgynlais Community Hospital.
