= Bronllys Hospital =

- Powys Teaching Health Board
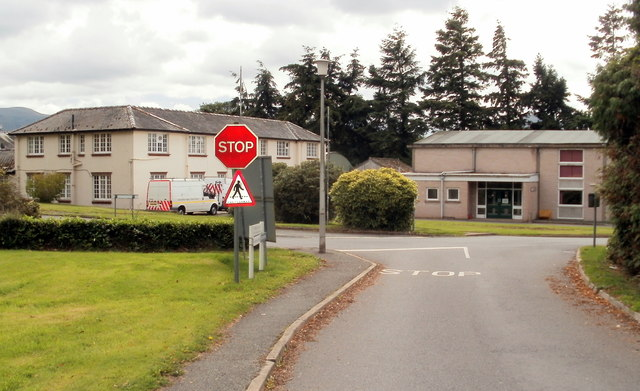
- Bronllys Hospital

- Shown in Powys

Geography
- Location: Bronllys, Powys, Wales, United Kingdom
- Coordinates: 52.0072°N 3.2580°W

Organisation
- Care system: NHS Wales
- Type: Community
- Affiliated university: Cardiff University

Services
- Emergency department: No Accident & Emergency

History
- Founded: 1920

Links
- Lists: Hospitals in Wales

Bronllys Hospital (Welsh: Ysbyty Bronllys) is a health facility in Bronllys, Wales. It is managed by Powys Teaching Health Board. The Basil Webb Hall and the Chapel are Grade II listed buildings. The hospital grounds are listed as Grade II on the Cadw/ICOMOS Register of Parks and Gardens of Special Historic Interest in Wales.

== History ==
The hospital was established as a tuberculosis facility known as the South Wales Sanitorium. It was designed by Edwin Thomas Hall and Stanley Hall in the arts and crafts style and was opened by King George V and Queen Mary in 1920. The chapel, which was a gift from Sir David Llewellyn and Lord Buckland, opened at the same time. The hospital joined the National Health Service in 1948. One of the buildings, Glasbury House, is now the headquarters of Powys Teaching Health Board and it was announced in February 2015 that Llewellyn Ward would remain open with GP support.

== Services ==
The hospital does not have an accident & emergency department, nor does it have a minor injuries unit. The hospital offers inpatient medical, rehabilitative, and palliative medical care, as well as an inpatient psychiatric ward for voluntary patients and those sectioned under the Mental Health Act 1983.
