= Bro Ddyfi Community Hospital =

Hospital in Machynlleth, Powys, Wales

- Powys Teaching Health Board
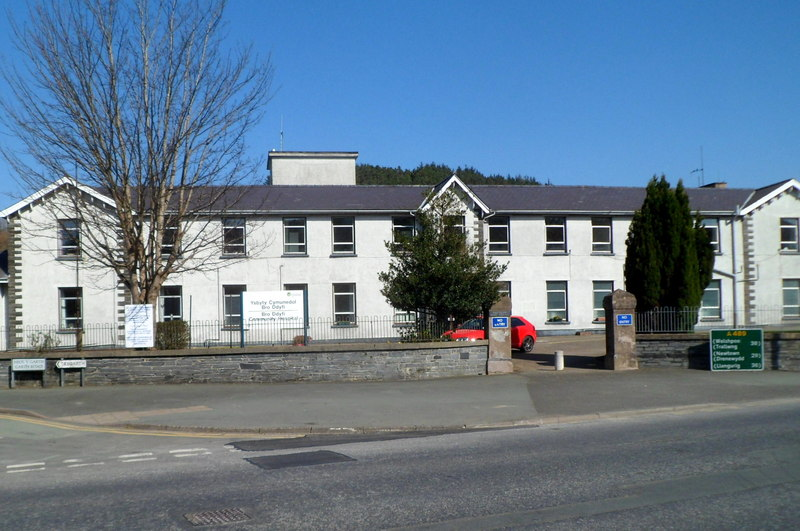
- Bro Ddyfi Community Hospital

- Shown in Powys

Geography
- Location: Heol Maengwyn, Machynlleth, Powys, Wales
- Coordinates: 52.5916°N 3.8457°W

Organisation
- Care system: NHS Wales
- Type: Community

History
- Founded: 1860

Links
- Lists: Hospitals in Wales

Bro Ddyfi Community Hospital (Welsh: Ysbyty Cymuned Bro Ddyfi) is a health facility in Heol Maengwyn, Machynlleth, Powys, Wales. It is managed by the Powys Teaching Health Board.

== History ==
The facility has its origins in the Machynlleth Union Workhouse which opened in 1860. After serving as a Red Cross Hospital during the First World War, it was converted into a hospital for tuberculosis patients, re-opening as the King Edward VII Memorial Hospital in 1920. It joined the National Health Service as the Machynlleth Chest Hospital in 1948 and subsequently evolved to become a community hospital. An upgrade to the hospital costing £15 million, including the incorporation of the local GP surgery, community dentistry and adult mental health services, was completed in 2023.
