= Montgomery County Infirmary =

- Powys Teaching Health Board
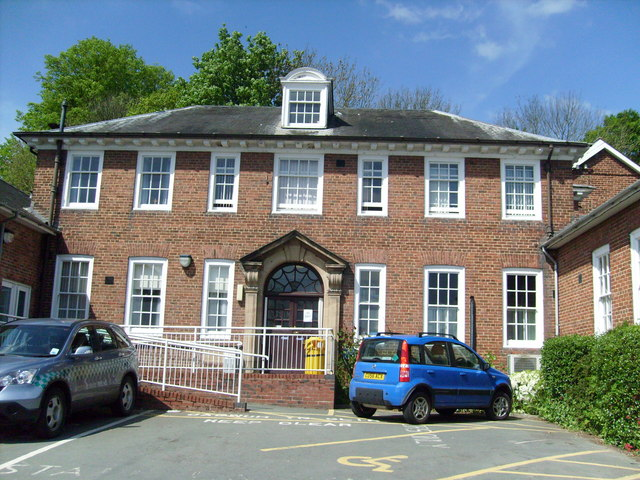
- Montgomery County Infirmary

- Shown in Powys

Geography
- Location: Llanfair Road, Newtown, Powys, Wales
- Coordinates: 52.5213°N 3.3139°W

Organisation
- Care system: NHS Wales
- Type: Community

History
- Founded: 1868

Links
- Lists: Hospitals in Wales

Montgomery County Infirmary (Welsh: Ysbyty Sir Drefaldwyn) is a health facility in Llanfair Road, Newtown, Powys, Wales. It is managed by the Powys Teaching Health Board.

== History ==
The facility was established in a private house in 1868 and, after a major fund-raining campaign for a new building, moved into expanded facilities in Llanfair Road in 1911. It joined the National Health Service in 1948 and subsequently evolved to become a community hospital.
