= Tenby Cottage Hospital =

- Hywel Dda University Health Board
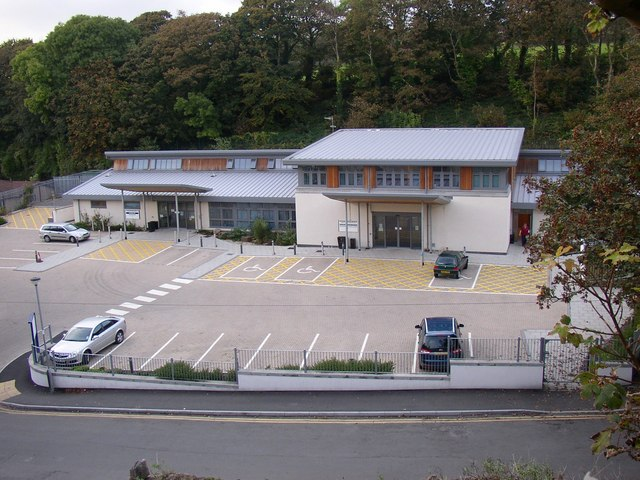
- Tenby Cottage Hospital

- Shown in Pembrokeshire

Geography
- Location: Tenby, Wales, United Kingdom
- Coordinates: 51.6780°N 4.7025°W

Organisation
- Care system: Public NHS
- Type: Community Hospital

History
- Founded: 1876

Links
- Lists: Hospitals in Wales

Tenby Cottage Hospital (Welsh: Ysbyty Bwthyn Dinbych y Pysgod) is a community hospital in Tenby, Wales. It is managed by the Hywel Dda University Health Board.

== History ==
The hospital has its origins in a cottage hospital which opened at Trafalgar Road in Tenby in 1871. It moved to modern facilities in Gas Lane, which were officially opened by Brian Gibbons, Minister for Health and Social Services in the Welsh Assembly Government, in June 2006.
