= Knighton Hospital =

- Powys Teaching Health Board
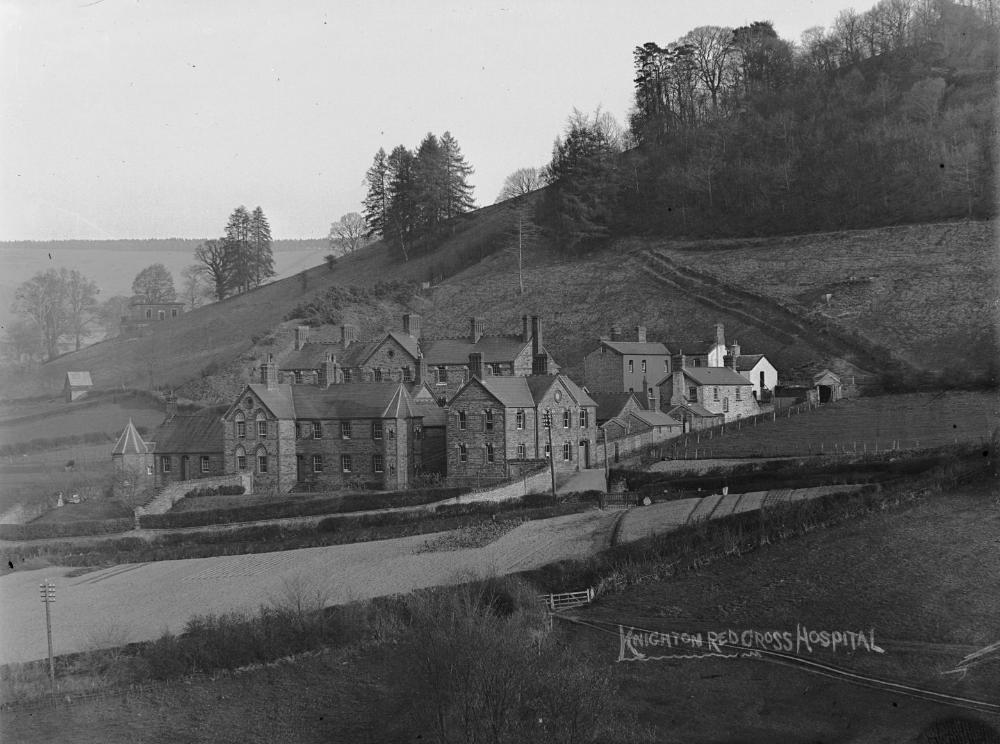
- Knighton Red Cross Hospital

- Shown in Powys

Geography
- Location: Ffrydd Road, Knighton, Powys, Wales
- Coordinates: 52.3422°N 3.0497°W

Organisation
- Care system: NHS Wales
- Type: Community

History
- Founded: 1837

Links
- Lists: Hospitals in Wales

Knighton Hospital (Welsh: Ysbyty Trefyclo) is a health facility in Ffrydd Road, Knighton, Powys, Wales. It is managed by the Powys Teaching Health Board.

== History ==
The facility has its origins in the Knighton Union Workhouse which was designed by Edward Jones and was completed in 1837. It has hit by a bad gas explosion in 1907 and then served as a Red Cross Hospital during the First World War. It became the Knighton Public Assistance Institution in 1930 and joined the National Health Service as Knighton Hospital in 1948. Due to staff shortages, the number of beds reduced from thirteen to seven in 2014. An old X-Ray room was converted into facilities for patients needing palliative care in 2017.
