= Aberaeron Hospital =

- Hywel Dda University Health Board
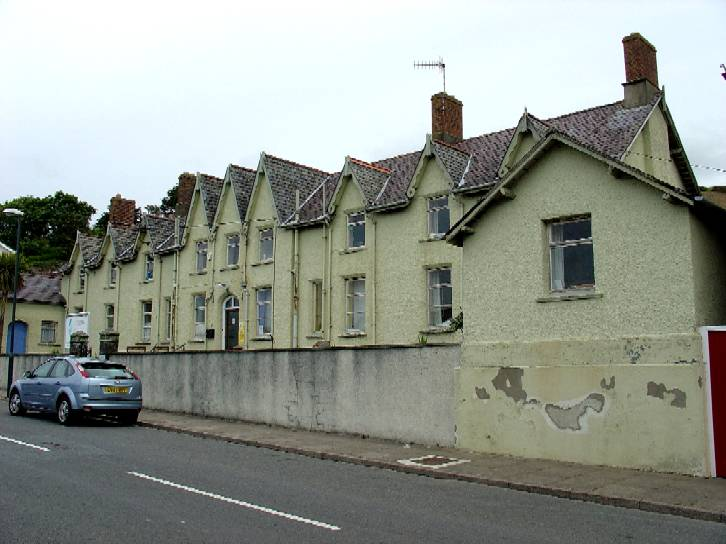
- Aberaeron Hospital

- Shown in Ceredigion

Geography
- Location: Aberaeron, Wales, United Kingdom
- Coordinates: 52.2425°N 4.2584°W

Organisation
- Care system: Public NHS
- Type: Community Hospital

History
- Founded: 1838
- Closed: 2019
- Demolished: 2021

Links
- Lists: Hospitals in Wales

Aberaeron Hospital (Welsh: Ysbyty Aberaeron) was a community hospital in Aberaeron, Wales. It was managed by the Hywel Dda University Health Board.

== History ==
The hospital has its origins in the Aberaeron Union Workhouse which was completed in 1838. It served as a hospital for injured soldiers during the First World War and became a cottage hospital in 1930.

The hospital closed in 2019 with services relocated to the Aberaeron Integrated Care Centre. Work to demolish the hospital begun in 2021 to make way for an apartment complex.
