= Bronglais Hospital =

- Hywel Dda University Health Board
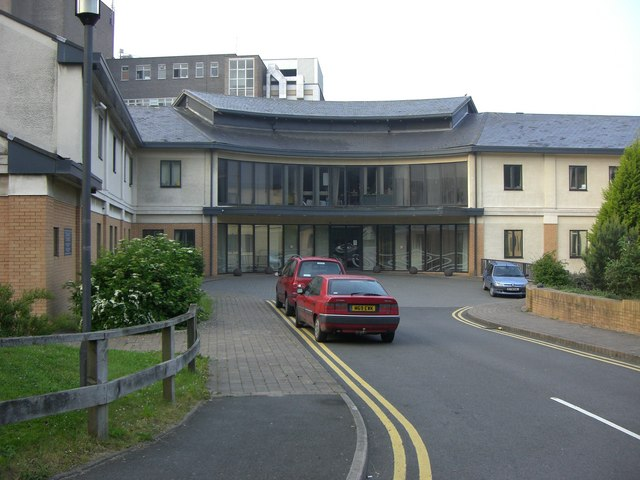
- The entrance to Bronglais Hospital

- Shown in Ceredigion

Geography
- Location: Aberystwyth, Ceredigion, Wales, United Kingdom
- Coordinates: 52.4160°N 4.0717°W

Organisation
- Care system: Public NHS
- Type: Community Hospital
- Affiliated university: Aberystwyth University

History
- Founded: 1821

Links
- Lists: Hospitals in Wales

Bronglais Hospital (Welsh: Ysbyty Bronglais) is an Acute District General Hospital in Aberystwyth, Wales. It is managed by Hywel Dda University Health Board. It is the only acute hospital within mid-Wales and is the main hospital for the students of Aberystwyth University.

== History ==
The hospital has its origins in Aberystwyth Dispensary which was founded in Great Darkgate Street in 1821. It moved to Upper Portland Street as the Aberystwyth Infirmary and Cardiganshire General Hospital in 1838, to Little Darkgate Street (now called Eastgate) in 1858 and to North Road in 1888. In the late 1930s tiles of nursery rhymes were installed to decorate the children's ward. They were designed by Edward W. Ball and made by Maw & Co.

The hospital joined the National Health Service as Aberystwyth and Cardiganshire General Hospital in 1948. Following the demolition of the Aberystwyth Union Workhouse, it moved to the site previously occupied by the workhouse in Caradog Road in 1966. A new accident and emergency department opened in March 2013. Local perceptions of under-investment in the hospital led the Welsh Institute for Health and Social Care to conclude in 2014 that there was "a near-dysfunctional level of mistrust, misunderstanding and concern" about the health board's plans.
