= Withybush General Hospital =

- Hywel Dda University Health Board
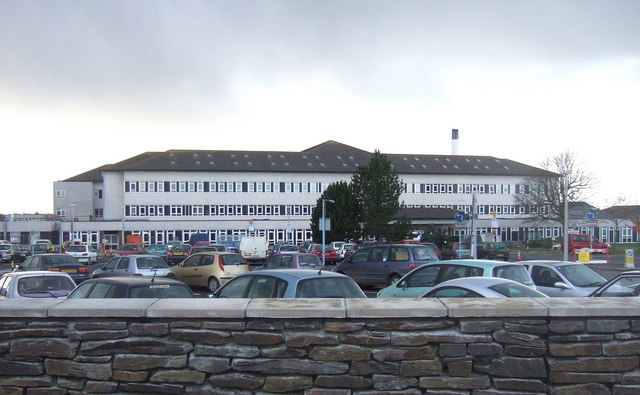
- Withybush General Hospital

- Shown in Pembrokeshire

Geography
- Location: Haverfordwest, Pembrokeshire, Wales, United Kingdom
- Coordinates: 51.8127°N 4.9647°W

Organisation
- Care system: Public NHS
- Type: District General

Services
- Emergency department: Yes Accident & Emergency

History
- Founded: 1942

Links
- Website: www.wales.nhs.uk/sitesplus/862/page/41088
- Lists: Hospitals in Wales

Withybush General Hospital (Welsh: Ysbyty Cyffredinol Llwynhelyg) is a district general hospital in Haverfordwest, Pembrokeshire, Wales. It is managed by Hywel Dda University Health Board.

== History ==
The hospital started life in 1942 as a wartime hospital for wounded soldiers. It was rebuilt between 1973 and 1978 and officially re-opened on 15 June 1979. A new Emergency and Urgent Care centre was opened in 2010.

There were concerns about the hospital's long term prospects, leading to protests in 2010.

In August 2014, a change was made to maternity care at Withybush which saw consultant-led services close and be replaced with a Midwifery Led Unit that could cater for straightforward births only. Care for complex births requiring consultants and all special care services is instead only provided from Glangwili Hospital.

In September 2014 a new renal dialysis unit run by Fresenius Medical Care Renal Services Ltd was opened at the hospital, with a contract to run for at least 7 years.

As part of the reorganisation of acute services in Wales a 24/7 inpatient paediatric service was to be provided at West Wales General Hospital from October 2014. Withybush was to have a new 12-hour paediatric ambulatory care unit.

In April 2018 plans were announced to downgrade Withybush to a community hospital, with plans for a new hospital to be built near the Pembrokeshire-Carmarthenshire border. A demonstration through Haverfordwest and other protests were held against the downgrading and loss of Accident and Emergency facilities.

== Services ==
Services offered or in development include inpatient facilities for palliative care, oncology and haematology patients.
