= Cardigan and District Community Hospital =

- Hywel Dda University Health Board
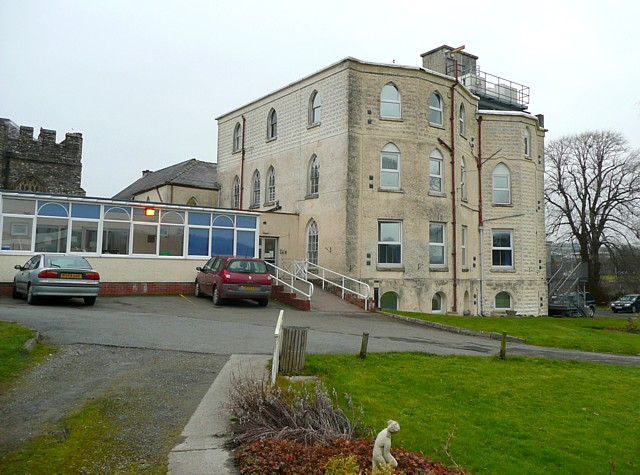
- Cardigan and District Community Hospital

- Shown in Ceredigion

Geography
- Location: Cardigan, Ceredigion, Wales, United Kingdom
- Coordinates: 52.0828°N 4.6554°W

Organisation
- Care system: Public NHS
- Type: Community Hospital

History
- Founded: 1920

Links
- Lists: Hospitals in Wales

Cardigan and District Community Hospital (Welsh: Aberteifi a'r Cylch Ysbyty Cymunedol) was a community hospital in Cardigan, Ceredigion, Wales. It was managed by Hywel Dda University Health Board.

== History ==
The building was originally a private house known as "The Priory" which was designed by John Nash and completed in 1789. It was converted into a hospital, based on designs by John Teifion James Williams, and re-opened in March 1922. A new outpatients department was opened by Dame Margaret Lloyd-George in September 1923. It joined the National Health Service in 1948 and the interior was completely rebuilt in the early 1960s. It closed to inpatients in 2013.

After outpatient services were transferred to Cardigan Integrated Health Centre, it closed completely on 10 December 2019. The future of the site is under discussion.
