= Bronllys =

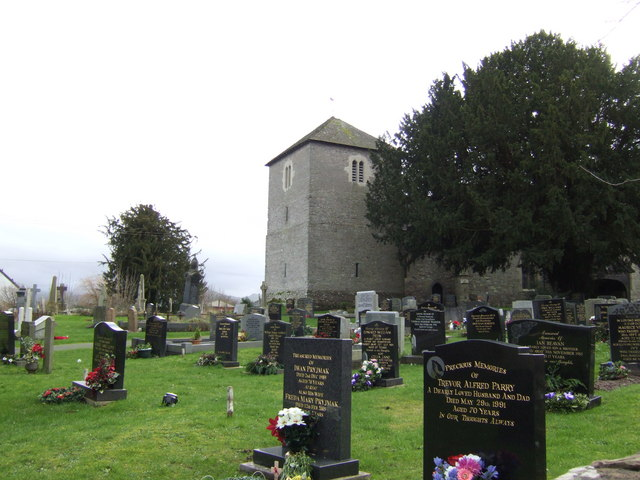
- Detached Tower of St Mary's Church, Bronllys

- Location within Powys
- Area: 12.2 km^{2} (4.7 sq mi)
- Population: 853 (2011)
  - Density: 70/km^{2} (180/sq mi)
- OS grid reference: SO144350
  - Cardiff: 58 km (36 mi) South
  - London: 223 km (139 mi) East
- Community: Bronllys
- Principal area: Powys
- Preserved county: Powys
- Country: Wales
- Sovereign state: United Kingdom
- Post town: BRECON
- Postcode district: LD3
- Police: Dyfed-Powys
- Fire: Mid and West Wales
- Ambulance: Welsh
- UK Parliament: Brecon, Radnor and Cwm Tawe
- Senedd Cymru – Welsh Parliament: Brecon and Radnorshire
- List of places UK Wales Powys 52.007°N 3.249°W Community map: Map of the community

Bronllys is a village and community situated in Powys, Wales, nestled between the towns of Brecon and Talgarth. The village is part of the historic county of Brecknockshire (Breconshire) and serves as an electoral ward for Powys County Council. The community also encompasses the nearby village of Llyswen.

== Description ==
Bronllys has recently seen infrastructure improvements with the construction of a bypass as part of the Talgarth Relief Road and Bronllys Bypass scheme, which has helped to ease traffic congestion in the area. Despite its small size, the village offers amenities such as a swimming pool, a small leisure centre, a post office, and a hospital.

== Bronllys Castle ==
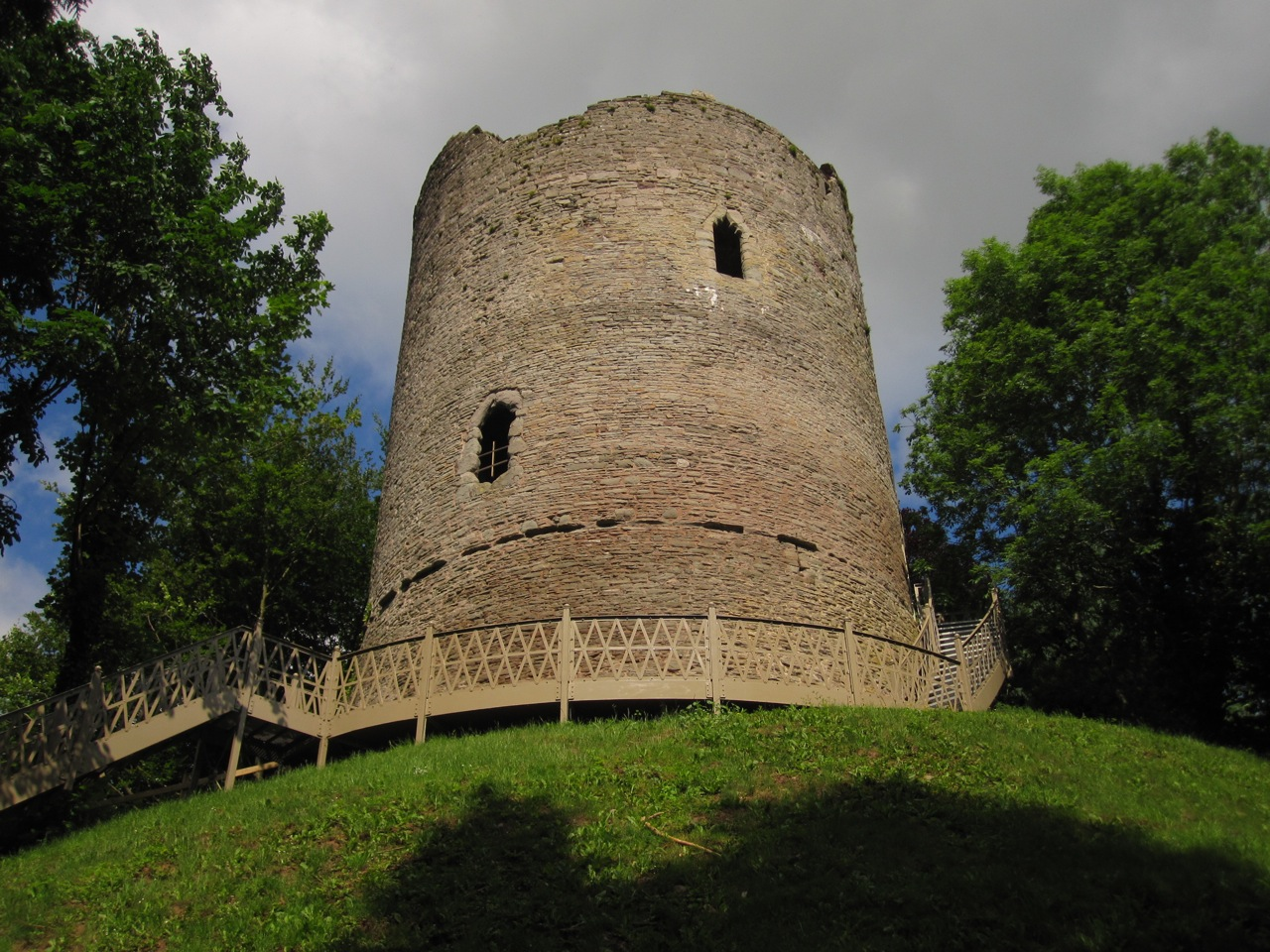
Bronllys Castle motte and tower

One of the village's notable historical landmarks is Bronllys Castle, a motte and bailey fortress standing south of the village, towards Talgarth. The castle was originally founded around 1100 by Richard Fitz Pons, the owner of the adjacent Herefordshire barony of Clifford, who was a supporter of Bernard of Neufmarché, the Lord of Brecknock (in which the land around Bronllys fell). The castle initially featured a wooden structure typical of the motte-and-bailey design.

By the time it became a crown property in 1521, Bronllys Castle had fallen into significant disrepair, a fact recorded by the antiquarian John Leland. By 1583, the castle's condition had deteriorated further. Today, the castle is managed by Cadw, the organization responsible for preserving historic monuments in Wales, and it is open to the public between April and October.

== Bedo Brwynllys ==
The minor Welsh bard Bedo Brwynllys lived in Bronllys in the 15th century. His poetry is characteristic of a follower or imitator of Dafydd ap Gwilym and is mainly love poetry or religious poetry and some eulogistic poems such as his elegy for Sir Richard Herbert of Coldbrook, written in 1469.

== Governance ==
An electoral ward in the same name exists. This ward includes Erwood and at the 2011 Census had a total population of 1,282. The ward elects a county councillor to Powys County Council.
