= Tregaron Hospital =

Hospital in Ceredigion, Wales

- Hywel Dda University Health Board
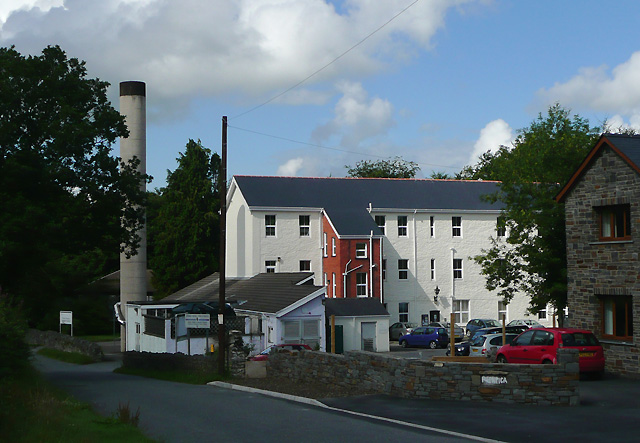
- Tregaron Hospital

- Shown in Ceredigion

Geography
- Location: Tregaron, Wales, United Kingdom
- Coordinates: 52.2156°N 3.9357°W

Organisation
- Care system: Public NHS
- Type: Community Hospital

History
- Founded: 1876

Links
- Lists: Hospitals in Wales

Tregaron Hospital (Welsh: Ysbyty Tregaron) is a community hospital in Tregaron, Wales. It is managed by the Hywel Dda University Health Board.

== History ==
The hospital has its origins in the Aberaeron Union Workhouse which was completed in 1876. It became a facility for the treatment of tuberculosis sufferers known as the King Edward VII Memorial Hospital in 1915. In 2016 the health board made proposals to replace the hospital with a health centre.
