= Local health board =

NHS Wales administrative unit

Map of the 7 NHS Wales Local Health Boards

A local health board (LHB; Welsh: bwrdd iechyd lleol) is an administrative unit of NHS Wales, established in 2003. Following a reorganisation in 2009, there are currently seven local health boards in Wales. Local health boards may use an operational name of either University Health Board (Welsh: Bwrdd Iechyd Prifysgol) or Teaching Health Board (Welsh: Bwrdd lechyd Addysgu) in their names.

The LHBs were operationally launched on 1 April 2003, following the coming into force of The Local Health Boards (Establishment) (Wales) Order 2003 on 10 February 2003, replacing the five Health Authorities in Wales. In 2003, there were 22 LHBs in Wales, corresponding to one LHB for each principal area of Wales. These new boards would receive roughly three-quarters of the allocated budget for NHS Wales, and the boards were set up to effectively plan services for the populations of their respective local authorities. The boards were given the responsibility of financing hospital trusts, G.Ps, dentists, and other healthcare professionals to provide these services. The Health Commission Wales (Specialist Services) was also created on 1 April 2003 to take over the responsibility of a few services, previously allocated to the Health Authorities, on an all-Wales basis for more effective planning and service, such as the services for; cardiac surgery, emergency ambulance services, and some children's services.

In 2009, the health boards were reorganised and merged with local NHS hospital trusts into seven larger local health boards, coming into effect on 1 October 2009, replacing the system in use since 2003.

Alongside the seven local health boards there are three all-Wales NHS trusts of NHS Wales (Public Health Wales, Velindre University NHS Trust and the Welsh Ambulance Service) and one Special Health Authority (Health Education and Improvement Wales).

== List of local health boards ==
Between 2003 and 2009, there were 22 local health boards, corresponding to each principal area, for example, the health board for Vale of Glamorgan was the Vale of Glamorgan Local Health Board, and the board for Wrexham County Borough was the Wrexham Local Health Board. In addition, there were changing numbers of NHS trusts since their establishment following the National Health Service and Community Care Act 1990, due to mergers of some trusts, by 2009 there were 10 local NHS trusts in Wales. These local trusts were then abolished and their functions transferred to the local health boards in 2009.

The current seven local health boards in Wales are:

- Swansea Bay University Health Board, formerly Abertawe Bro Morgannwg University Health Board
- Aneurin Bevan University Health Board, the operational name for Aneurin Bevan Local Health Board
- Betsi Cadwaladr University Health Board
- Cardiff and Vale University Health Board
- Cwm Taf Morgannwg University Health Board, formerly Cwm Taf University Health Board
- Hywel Dda University Health Board, the operational name for Hywel Dda Local Health Board
- Powys Teaching Health Board

A map of the seven local health boards (LHBs) in Wales is shown below. Each LHB is responsible for delivering all NHS healthcare services within a geographical area, divided into a number of Network Clusters.

Betsi Cadwaladr University Health Board: Anglesey; Arfon; Central & South Denbighshire; Conwy East; Conwy west; North East Flintshire; Dwyfor; North West Flintshire; Meirionnydd; South Flintshire; North Denbighshire; South Wrexham; North & West Wrexham; Central Wrexham; Hywel Dda University Health Board: Amman/Gwendraeth; Llanelli; North Ceredigion; North Pembrokeshire; South Ceredigion; South Pembrokeshire; Taf/Tywi; Cwm Taf Morgannwg University Health Board: Bridgend East Network; Bridgend North Network; Bridgend West Network; North Cynon; North Merthyr Tydfil; North Rhondda; North Taf Ely; South Cynon; South Merthyr Tydfil; South Rhondda; South Taf Ely	Powys Teaching Health Board: Mid Powys; North Powys; South Powys; Cardiff and Vale University Health Board: Cardiff East; Cardiff South East; City & Cardiff South; Cardiff North; Cardiff South West; Cardiff West; Central Vale; Eastern Vale; Western Vale; Swansea Bay University Health Board: Afan; BayHealth; CityHealth; Cwmtawe; Llwchwr; Neath; Penderi; Upper Valleys; Aneurin Bevan University Health Board: Blaenau Gwent East; Blaenau Gwent West; Caerphilly East; Caerphilly North; Caerphilly South; Monmouthshire North; Monmouthshire South; Newport North; Newport East; Newport West; Torfaen North; Torfaen South
