= Powys Teaching Health Board =

NHS local health board in Powys, Wales

- Bwrdd lechyd Addysgu Powys

- Map of service area (Powys) in Wales
- Type: NHS Wales local health board
- Established: 2003
- Headquarters: Glasbury House, Bronllys Hospital
- Region served: Powys
- Area size: 2,000 square miles (5,200 km^{2})
- Population: 133,000
- Budget: £300m
- Hospitals: Brecon War Memorial Hospital; Bronllys Hospital; Knighton Hospital; Llandrindod Wells County War Memorial Hospital; Llanidloes War Memorial Hospital; Bro Ddyfi Community Hospital; Montgomery County Infirmary; Victoria Memorial Hospital; Ystradgynlais Community Hospital
- Chair: Carl Cooper
- Chief executive: Hayley Thomas (interim)
- Website: pthb.nhs.wales

Powys Teaching Health Board (PTHB) (Welsh: Bwrdd lechyd Addysgu Powys) is the local health board of NHS Wales for Powys in Mid Wales. PTHB is responsible for healthcare in Powys, covering the same area as Powys County Council. It was established in 2003. Its headquarters are at Bronllys Hospital near Talgarth, Powys, Wales. Powys Teaching Health Board is the operational name of Powys Local Health Board.

== History ==
Powys Teaching Health Board was established in 2003, replacing the former Powys Healthcare NHS Trust. It was the only Local Health Board not to be dissolved under The Local Health Boards (Establishment and Dissolution) (Wales) Order 2009 (S.I. 2009/778 (W.66)), “the Establishment Order (S.I. 2009/778 (W.66)). Most of its functions are set out in the Local Health Boards (Directed Functions) (Wales) Regulations 2009 (S.I. 2009/1511 (W.147)).

== Hospitals ==
Local hospitals include:

- Brecon War Memorial Hospital, Brecon
- Bronllys Hospital, Bronllys
- Knighton Hospital, Knighton
- Llandrindod Wells County War Memorial Hospital, Llandrindod Wells
- Llanidloes War Memorial Hospital, Llanidloes
- Bro Ddyfi Community Hospital, Machynlleth
- Montgomery County Infirmary, Newtown
- Victoria Memorial Hospital, Welshpool
- Ystradgynlais Community Hospital, Ystradgynlais

The main provider of ambulance services for Powys is the Welsh Ambulance Services NHS Trust.

== Health and Care Strategy for Powys ==
In 2017, Powys Teaching Health Board in partnership with Powys County Council published the first Integrated Health and Care Strategy for Powys. This set out a shared vision for a healthy, caring Powys and how local organisations aimed to support people and communities to Start Well, Live Well and Age Well. The delivery of the Strategy was taken forward through a joint Area Plan, overseen by the statutory Powys Regional Partnership Board established under the Social Services and Wellbeing Act 2014.
