= Amman Valley Hospital =

- Hywel Dda University Health Board
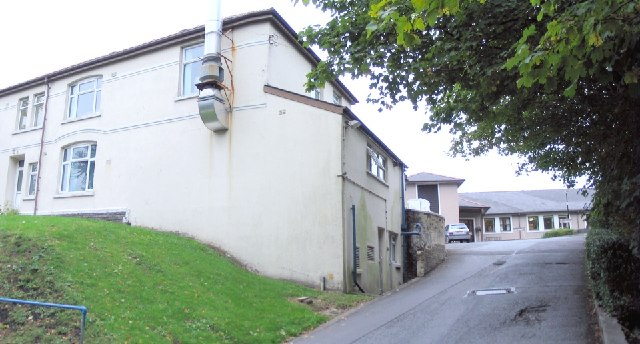
- Amman Valley Hospital

- Shown in Carmarthenshire

Geography
- Location: Ammanford, Wales, United Kingdom
- Coordinates: 51.8084°N 3.9226°W

Organisation
- Care system: NHS Wales
- Type: Community hospital

Services
- Emergency department: No
- Beds: 28

History
- Founded: 1936

Amman Valley Hospital (Welsh: Ysbyty Dyffryn Aman) is a community hospital in Ammanford, Wales. It is managed by the Hywel Dda University Health Board.

== History ==
The hospital was established as the Amman Valley Cottage Hospital in 1936. The hospital joined the National Health Service in 1948 and benefited from a new day care unit in 1995 and a new ophthalmology day case theatre in 2001.
