= Brecon War Memorial Hospital =

- Powys Teaching Health Board
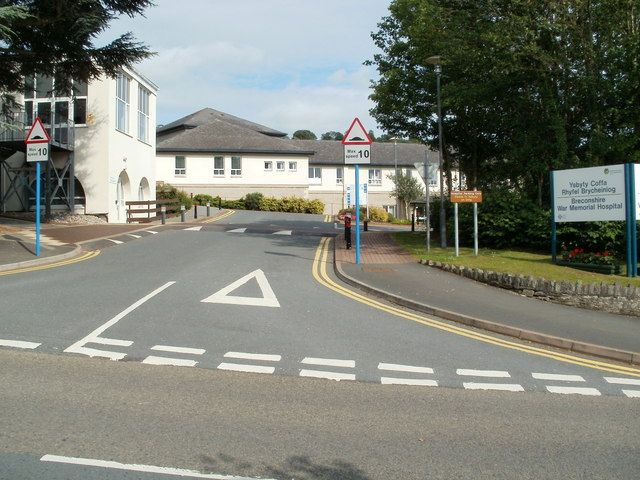
- Brecon War Memorial Hospital

- Shown in Powys

Geography
- Location: Cerrigcochion Road, Brecon, Powys, Wales
- Coordinates: 51.9488°N 3.3844°W

Organisation
- Care system: NHS Wales
- Type: Community

History
- Founded: 1928

Links
- Lists: Hospitals in Wales

Brecon War Memorial Hospital (Welsh: Ysbyty Coffa Rhyfel Brycheiniog) is a health facility in Cerrigcochion Road, Brecon, Powys, Wales. It is managed by the Powys Teaching Health Board.

== History ==
The facility was commissioned to replace the old Brecon Infirmary which was located on the north side of the Watton. It commemorated local soldiers who had died in the First World War and was officially opened as the Breconshire War Memorial Hospital by Lord Glanusk in January 1928. It joined the National Health Service in 1948. The Powys stroke rehabilitation unit moved to the hospital in February 2014.
