= Llandrindod Wells County War Memorial Hospital =

- Powys Teaching Health Board
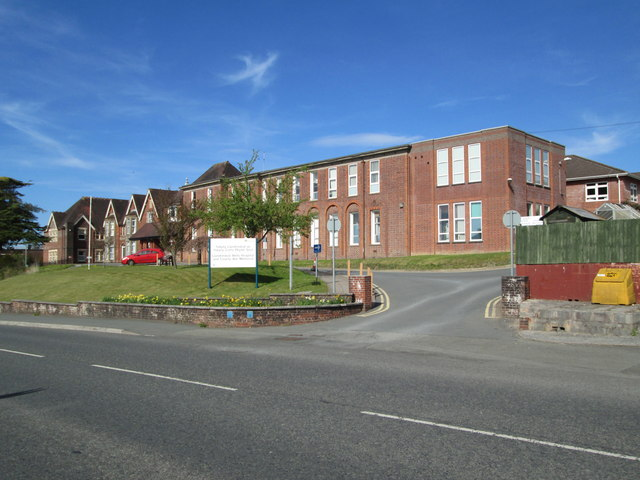
- Llandrindod Wells County War Memorial Hospital

- Shown in Powys

Geography
- Location: Temple Street, Llandrindod Wells, Powys, Wales
- Coordinates: 52.2435°N 3.3768°W

Organisation
- Care system: NHS Wales
- Type: Community

History
- Founded: 1881

Links
- Lists: Hospitals in Wales

Llandrindod Wells County War Memorial Hospital (Welsh: Ysbyty Coffa Rhyfel Sir Llandrindod Wells) is a health facility in Temple Street, Llandrindod Wells, Powys, Wales. It is managed by the Powys Teaching Health Board.

== History ==
The facility was opened as the Llandrindod Wells Cottage Hospital and Convalescent Home in 1881. In order to commemorate the lives of local service personnel who had died in the First World War, it was renamed the Llandrindod Wells Hospital and County War Memorial in 1924 and joined the National Health Service as the Llandrindod Wells County War Memorial Hospital in 1948. A new 16-bed renal unit opened at the hospital in spring 2012 and a new Ithon birthing unit opened there in spring 2017.
