= Victoria Memorial Hospital =

- Powys Teaching Health Board
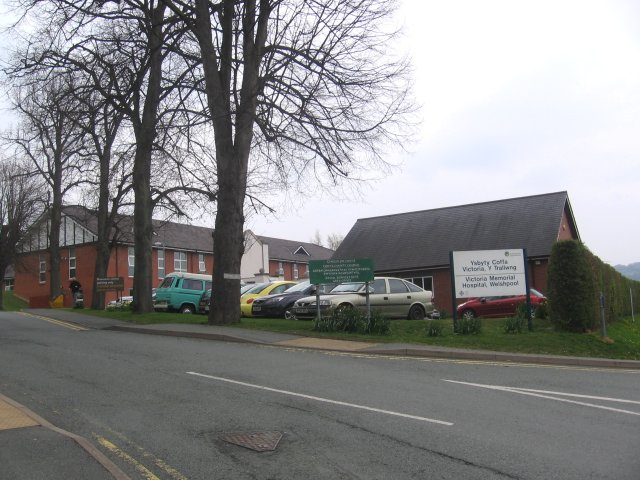
- Victoria Memorial Hospital

- Shown in Powys

Geography
- Location: Salop Road, Welshpool, Powys, Wales
- Coordinates: 52.6623°N 3.1434°W

Organisation
- Care system: NHS Wales
- Type: Community

History
- Founded: 1902

Links
- Lists: Hospitals in Wales

The Victoria Memorial Hospital (Welsh: Ysbyty Coffa Victoria) is a health facility in Salop Road, Welshpool, Powys, Wales. It is managed by the Powys Teaching Health Board.

== History ==
The facility has its origins in the Victoria Nursing Institute, the site for which was a gift from the Misses Howell of Rhiewport. It was designed by Frank Shayler, built by Evan Davies and opened in November 1902. It joined the National Health Service as the Victoria Memorial Hospital in 1948 and was substantially rebuilt in 2004. A new 12-bed renal unit opened at the hospital in January 2013.
