= Llandovery Hospital =

Hospital in Carmarthenshire, Wales

- Hywel Dda University Health Board
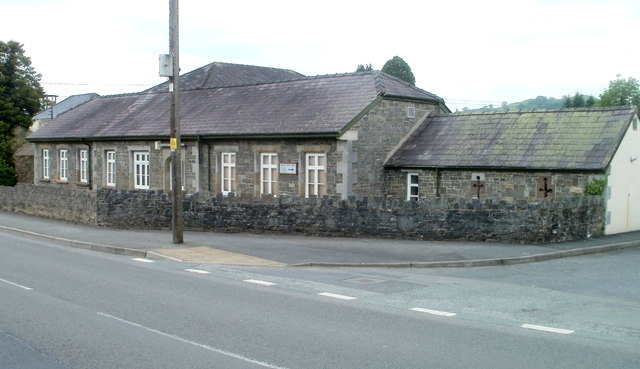
- Llandovery Hospital

- Shown in Carmarthenshire

Geography
- Location: Llandovery, Wales, United Kingdom
- Coordinates: 51.9984°N 3.7967°W

Organisation
- Care system: NHS Wales
- Type: Community hospital

Services
- Emergency department: No
- Beds: 18

History
- Founded: 1838

Llandovery Hospital (Welsh: Ysbyty Llanymddyfri) is a community hospital in Llandovery, Wales. It is managed by the Hywel Dda University Health Board.

== History ==
The hospital has its origins in the Llandovery Union Workhouse and Infirmary which was established in 1838. It became a Public Assistance Institution in 1930 and joined the National Health Service as a children's home in 1948 before becoming a community hospital in the 1960s. More recently it established a rehabilitation unit for elderly patients.
