= Prince Philip Hospital =

- Hywel Dda University Health Board
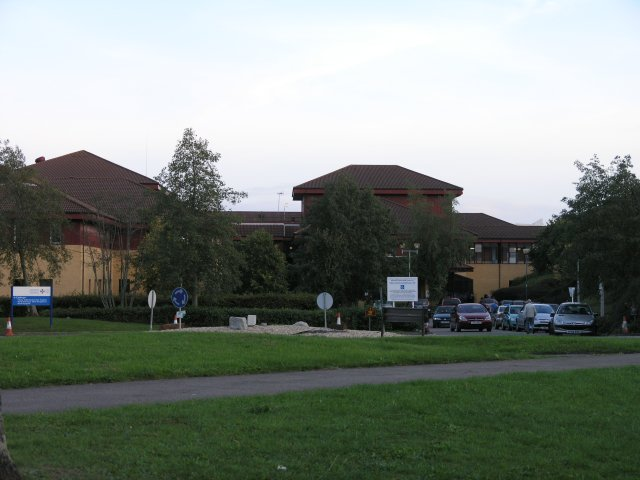
- Prince Philip Hospital

- Shown in Carmarthenshire

Geography
- Location: Llanelli, Wales, United Kingdom
- Coordinates: 51.6923°N 4.1361°W

Organisation
- Care system: NHS Wales
- Type: General hospital

Services
- Emergency department: Minor Injuries Unit

History
- Founded: 1990

Prince Philip Hospital (Welsh: Ysbyty Tywysog Philip) is a hospital in Llanelli, Wales. It is managed by Hywel Dda University Health Board.

== History ==
The hospital, which was designed by Holder Mathias, was built in the late 1980s and was completed in May 1990. The hospital expanded when a new breast care unit opened in October 2010.

The Mynydd Mawr Rehabilitation Unit was established at the hospital after to accommodate services transferred from Mynydd Mawr Hospital in October 2013. Following the closure of the accident and emergency department, a minor injuries unit opened at the hospital in 2016.
