= Hywel Dda University Health Board =

NHS local health board in West Wales

- Bwrdd Iechyd Prifysgol Hywel Dda

- Map of service area in Wales
- Type: NHS Wales; Local health board
- Headquarters: Hafan Derwen, Carmarthen, Carmarthenshire, SA31 3BB
- Region served: Carmarthenshire; Ceredigion; Pembrokeshire
- Hospitals: Aberaeron Hospital; Amman Valley Hospital; Bronglais Hospital; Cardigan and District Community Hospital; Glangwili General Hospital; Llandovery Hospital; Prince Philip Hospital; South Pembrokeshire Hospital; St David's Hospital, Carmarthen; Tenby Cottage Hospital; Tregaron Hospital; Withybush General Hospital
- Chief executive: Steve Moore
- Website: hduhb.nhs.wales

Hywel Dda University Health Board (HDUHB; Welsh: Bwrdd Iechyd Prifysgol Hywel Dda) is the local health board of NHS Wales for the west of Wales. Established on 1 October 2009 from the merger of the Hywel Dda NHS Trust, the Pembrokeshire Local Health Board, Ceredigion Local Health Board and Carmarthenshire Local Health Board. The local health board is named in honour of historic south west Wales king Hywel Dda. Hywel Dda University Health Board provides healthcare services to a total population of around 385,615 throughout Carmarthenshire, Ceredigion and Pembrokeshire. The headquarters of Hywel Dda is based in Hafan Derwen, St David's Park, Carmarthen, Wales. Hywel Dda University Health Board is the operational name of Hywel Dda Local Health Board.

The former Hywel Dda NHS Trust (Welsh: Ymddiriedolaeth GIG Hywel Dda) was formed on 1 April 2008 replacing Carmarthenshire NHS Trust, Ceredigion & Mid Wales NHS Trust and Pembrokeshire & Derwen NHS Trust.

== Hospitals ==
Acute hospitals are marked with a *

- Aberaeron Hospital, Aberaeron
- Amman Valley Hospital, Ammanford
- Bronglais Hospital, Aberystwyth*
- Cardigan and District Community Hospital, Cardigan
- Glangwili General Hospital, Carmarthen*
- Llandovery Hospital, Llandovery
- Prince Philip Hospital, Llanelli*
- South Pembrokeshire Hospital, Pembroke Dock
- St David's Hospital, Carmarthen (Cwm Seren, Tudor House and Ty Bryn)
- Tenby Cottage Hospital, Tenby
- Tregaron Hospital, Tregaron
- Withybush General Hospital, Haverfordwest*

== Performance ==
The board spent £3,676,211 on private health providers between April 2013 and March 2015 to carry out NHS work on elective surgery because difficulties with recruitment impaired its capacity for elective surgery.
