= Glangwili General Hospital =

- Hywel Dda University Health Board
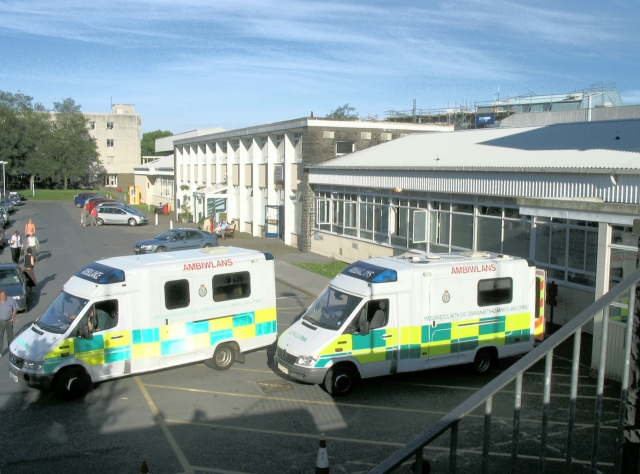
- Glangwili General Hospital

- Shown in Carmarthenshire

Geography
- Location: Carmarthen, Carmarthenshire, Wales
- Coordinates: 51.8681°N 4.2846°W

Organisation
- Care system: NHS
- Type: General

History
- Founded: 25 March 1949

Links
- Lists: Hospitals in Wales

Glangwili General Hospital (Welsh: Ysbyty Cyffredinol Glangwili), previously known as West Wales General Hospital, is a general hospital in Carmarthen, Wales. It is managed by Hywel Dda University Health Board.

== History ==
The site of the hospital was a World War II American Military Hospital, acquired from the War Office in 1947.

The hospital opened as the West Wales General Hospital on 25 March 1949.

After the opening of the West Wales General Hospital, the town's other hospital, Carmarthen Infirmary, became known as Priory Street Hospital. Instruments and equipment were shared between the two hospitals.

In 1954, a new general theatre was built on the site, followed by further expansion including three 32-bed wards. Additional wards were added in 1958 (Ward Block 1), 1961 (Ward Block 2) and 1968 (Ward Blocks 3 & 4). An A&E department was opened in 1960. A 6-bed Intensive Care Unit opened in 1985.

In 1986, structural defects were discovered in the four main Ward Blocks of the West Wales General Hospital requiring major reconstruction which continued until April 1995.

In 1996, Priory Street Hospital closed, transferring all its patients to the West Wales General Hospital.

The hospital changed its name to Glangwili General Hospital following a vote in 2010.

In September 2014 a new renal dialysis unit run by Fresenius Medical Care Renal Services Ltd was opened at the hospital, with a contract to run for at least seven years. As part of the reorganisation of acute services in Wales a full-time inpatient paediatric service was provided at Glangwili from October 2014.
