= William Matheny (musician) =

American singer-songwriter

- Also known as: Billy Matheny
- Born: August 10, 1984 (age 42); Mannington, West Virginia
- Origin: Morgantown, West Virginia
- Genres: Rock; Roots rock Indie rock
- Occupation: Singer-songwriter
- Instruments: voice, guitar, keyboard
- Years active: 2004–present
- Labels: Bar/None Records, Misra Records, Battle Worldwide Recordings
- Website: williammatheny.com

William Matheny (also known as Billy Matheny) is an American singer-songwriter from Morgantown, West Virginia. Matheny was also a multi-instrumentalist for Southeast Engine and is currently a keyboardist and guitarist for The Paranoid Style. His musical style has been compared to the likes of Elvis Costello, Nick Lowe, Marshall Crenshaw, Tom Petty, and The Modern Lovers’ Jonathan Richman.

== Early life ==
Born in 1984 in Mannington, West Virginia, he is the grandson of Mansfield Matheny, lead singer for The Rhythm Rascals. His great-grandfather was a gospel singer and his father was a bluegrass guitarist. Matheny claims to have been performing with bands as a guitarist since the age of nine. He became the drummer of Cheap Truckers’ Speed as a teenager, eventually moving to Morgantown and becoming a musician-for-hire.

== Musical career ==
In 2008, Matheny joined The Joe Prichard Band, the front man was Joe Prichard of the band called The Recipe, Matheny would play electric guitar and banjo. Matheny then joined the band Southeast Engine as a pianist and organ player. He remained with the band until it went on "indefinite hiatus" at the end of 2012. Since that time, Matheny has continued to serve as a musician for The Paranoid Style (featuring Timothy Bracy of The Mendoza Line and Slow Dazzle) and Todd Burge, among others. He and his band have been writing and recording the album that would eventually become Strange Constellations since 2013. Matheny has appeared on the West Virginia Public Broadcasting program Mountain Stage a total of four times to date, both as a solo artist and as a member of a band.

== Current live band members ==
- Adam Meisterhans—guitar
- J. Tom Hnatow—guitar
- Bud Carroll—guitar
- Jeremy Batten—keyboard
- Ian Thornton—bass
- John R. Miller—bass
- Rod Elkins—drums
- Sean Hallock—drums
- Clint Sutton—drums

== Discography ==
=== As Billy Matheny ===
- Billy Matheny (self-released, 2004)
- Born of Frustration (self-released, 2006) – sometimes credited to "Billy Matheny & The Frustrations"

=== With Southeast Engine ===
- Canary (Misra Records, 2011)
- Canaanville (Misra Records, 2012)

=== With The Paranoid style ===
- The Power of Our Proven System (Misra Records, 2013)
- The Purposes of Music in General (Misra Records, 2013)
- Rock & Roll Just Can't Recall (Battle Worldwide Recordings, 2015)
- Rolling Disclosure (Bar/None Records, 2016)
- Underworld U.S.A. (Bar/None Records, 2017)

=== As William Matheny ===
- Blood Moon Singer EP (self-released, 2016)
- Strange Constellations (Misra Records, 2017)
- Moon Over Kenova (Misra Records, 2018)
- Flashes & Cables/Christian Name 7" (Misra Records, 2018)
- That Grand, Old Feeling (Holler Records, 2023)
- Material Wittnes
