= Strange Constellations =

Studio album by William Matheny
- Released: February 17, 2017
- Recorded: 2013–2016
- Genre: Rock
- Length: 40:54
- Label: Misra Records
- Producer: Bud Carroll

William Matheny chronology
Blood Moon Singer EP (2016)	Strange Constellations (2017)	Moon Over Kenova (2018)

Strange Constellations is the first full-length studio album by the singer-songwriter William Matheny since the indefinite hiatus of Southeast Engine, released on February 17, 2017. It is his debut release on Misra Records.

== Recording ==
The album was primarily recorded at Trackside Studio in Huntington, West Virginia. Additional recording took place at 3 Elliott Studio in Athens, Ohio, as well as Ronnie's Place and Electric Thunder, both in Nashville, Tennessee. It was produced and engineered by Bud Carroll (with additional engineering by Justin Francis), and mixed by Francis. Jeff Lipton mastered the album at Peerless Mastering in Boston, Massachusetts, along with assistant mastering engineer Maria Rice.

== Release ==
The illustration on the album cover was drawn by Bryn Perrott, with graphic design by David Pokrivnak. The album was released by Misra Records on compact disc and a limited-edition silver foil vinyl record for the first run. After it sold out, the LP for the second run became a gold-foil inlaid package.

== Reception ==
Professional ratings
Review scores
Source	Rating
Discogs	4.67/5 stars
Amazon	4.6/5 stars
Americana UK	8/10 stars
PopMatters	7/10 stars
AllMusic	3.5/5 stars

Daytrotter said of Matheny, "If you’re looking for your new favorite Americana rocker, look no further than the wonderful William Matheny," while comparing his sound favorably to The Jayhawks and Counting Crows. Additionally, "Living Half to Death" was chosen as a Heavy Rotation selection on NPR's Weekend Edition, stating that "Matheny has a knack for spinning stores about roach-infested apartments and social anxiety into indie gold.". Nashville Scene called it "a stout volume that folds some expert old-school storytelling into smart, nimble songs", while Paste praised it as "the perfect fusion of alt-country, rock, roots and pop."

== Track listing ==
All songs written by William Matheny

1. "Teenage Bones" – 3:25
2. "God's Left Hand" – 3:29
3. "Out for Revenge" – 2:41
4. "Living Half to Death" – 4:01
5. "Blood Moon Singer" – 4:08
6. "My Grandfather Knew Stoney Cooper" – 5:13
7. "29 Candles" – 3:24
8. "Foolish of Me" – 3:16
9. "Funny Papers" – 3:15
10. "Man of Science" – 4:31
11. "(I Pray) You'll Miss Me When I'm Gone" – 3:26

== Personnel ==
- William Matheny – vocals, electric guitar, acoustic guitar, acoustic 12-string guitar, piano
- Bud Carroll – drums, percussion, electric guitar, slide guitar, pedal steel, organ, vocals
- Adam Meisterhans – bass, electric guitar, slide guitar, electric 12-string guitar, baritone guitar
- Rod Elkins – percussion
- Shane Keister – electric piano
- Haley Slagle – vocals
- Ian Thornton – bass
- Brad Goodall – synthesizer
- Andrew Gillum – drums
- Zachary Nichols – Gabriel's horn
- Gabe Muncy – trumpet
- Robert Galloway – saxophone
- Tyler Grady – vocals
- Corey Hatton – vocals
- Cody Hatton – vocals
