= A Wheel Within a Wheel =

A Wheel Within A Wheel

Studio album by Southeast Engine
- Released: October 16, 2007
- Genre: Indie rock, folk rock
- Label: Misra Records

Southeast Engine chronology
Coming to Terms with Gravity (2005)	A Wheel Within A Wheel (2007)	From the Forest to the Sea (2009)

Professional ratings
Review scores
Source	Rating
Allmusic	link
Pitchfork Media	7.1/10 link
PopMatters	link

A Wheel Within A Wheel is the fourth full-length Album by Southeast Engine. After catching attention from The Wrens guitarist Charles Bissell, the band signed to Misra Records on his recommendation.

== Track listing ==
1. "Taking the Fall" – 4:00
2. "Ostrich" – 3:13
3. "We Have You Surrounded" – 2:08
4. "Quit While You're Ahead" – 3:21
5. "Pursuit of Happiness – Part 1" – 2:27
6. "Pursuit of Happiness – Part 2" – 2:06
7. "Psychoanalysis" – 3:20
8. "Reinventing Light" – 2:27
9. "State of Oblivion" – 3:57
10. "Oh God, Let Me Back In" – 5:07
11. "Ezekiel Saw the Wheel" – 2:09
12. "Fortune Teller" – 4:19
13. "Let It Be So" – 3:28

All songs written and performed by Southeast Engine.

== Personnel ==
- Adam Remnant: vocals, guitar, piano, organ
- Adam Torres: guitar, harmony vocals
- Josh Antonuccio: guitars, production
- Matthew Box: bass, harmony vocals
- Michael Lachman: piano, Wurlitzer, organ
- Leo DeLuca: drums, percussion
