= Paperhaus =

American rock band

- Origin: Washington, D.C., United States
- Genres: Neo-psychedelia, Art rock, experimental rock, indie rock
- Years active: 2006–present
- Label: Misra Records
- Members: Alex Tebeleff; Matt Dowling
- Past members: Eduardo Rivera; Jeff Galfond; Brandon Moses; Daniel Bentley; Johnny Fantastic; Evan Samek; Rick Irby

Paperhaus is a band from Washington, D.C. Taking their name from a song by Can, the band has been featured by NPR, Billboard, and BrooklynVegan.

== History ==
Paperhaus was founded in 2006 by Alexander Tebeleff (Blacklodge) with childhood friends Eduardo Rivera and Jeff Galfond, occasionally augmented by various collaborators. The group has released one LP, three EPs, and one single during their tenure and played several notable festivals across the United States. In 2016, Tebeleff added new partners Matt Dowling (Deleted Scenes, The Effects, Joy Buttons) and Rick Irby (Den-Mate, Wanted Man, Jau Ocean). In 2017, they signed with Misra Records for their first effort under the new lineup. Their second album "Are These The Questions That We Need To Ask?" will be released on 10/6/2017. Two singles, 'Go Cozy' and 'Nanana', were released in the summer of 2017 prior to the release of the album.

== DIY venue ==
The Paperhaus was also the name of the band's house venue, located in the Petworth neighborhood of Washington. Beginning in 2010, its reputation eventually grew large enough to warrant a profile in Mother Jones. However, in late 2015 it was forced to close due to noise complaints. By 2016, it was purchased and renovated by a real-estate developer and quickly listed with an asking price of $750,000.

== Discography ==
=== Albums ===
- Paperhaus (2015)
- Are These the Questions That We Need to Ask? (2017)

=== Singles & EPs ===
- Living Is Easy - EP (2009)
- Paperhaus - EP (2011)
- Lo Hi Lo - EP (2013)
- Silent Speaking - single (2016)
