= Conwy Town Council =

Community council in Conwy, Wales

Conwy Town Council Cyngor Tref Conwy

Type
- Type: Town council

Leadership
- Mayor: Bill Chapman (2017/18)

Structure
- Seats: 17
- Graph of the party split among 17 seats.
- Political groups: All parties (16) Plaid Cymru (2) Conservative (5) Reform (1) Independent (8) Vacancy (1) Vacant (1)

Meeting place
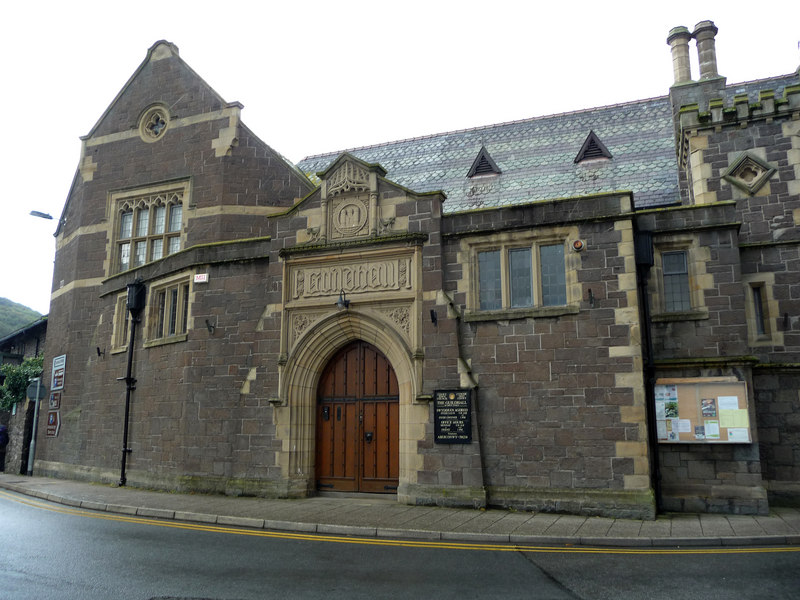
- Conwy Guildhall, Rose Hill Street, Conwy

Website
- www.conwytowncouncil.gov.uk

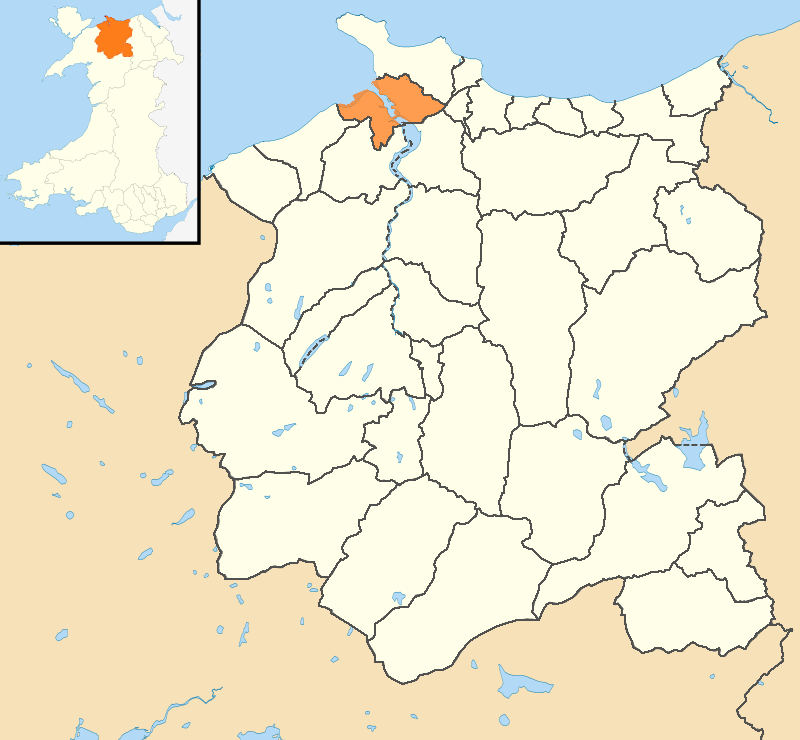
Location of Conwy within Conwy County Borough

Conwy Town Council is an elected community council serving the community of Conwy in Conwy County Borough, North Wales. As well as the old walled town of Conwy it represents the neighbouring towns of Deganwy and Llandudno Junction.

== Background ==
Conwy Town Council was formed in 1974 following local government reorganisation. The Council is made up of 17 town councillors elected from five community wards, namely Castle, Aberconwy, Deganwy, Marl and Pensarn.

The Council elects a mayor every year, who performs a ceremonial role and is also Constable of Conwy Castle. Following the May 2012 elections the town appointed London-born Cedric Rigal as its first Jewish mayor, with a rabbi reciting a prayer at the mayoral inauguration.

In 2015 the town council made the news when it appointed an official town jester to entertain the locals and visitors. Erwyd le Fol - real name Russel Erwood - had been a professional juggler and entertainer for 15 years and, as part of his costume, was given a special hat with donkey ears. He was the first jester-in-residence for the town since the 13th-century. The jester was officially appointed at a naming ceremony on 2 August 2015.
