= Fanfarlo =

British band

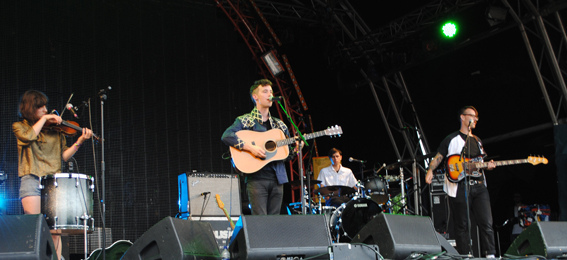
- Fanfarlo at Green Man festival

Background information
- Origin: London, UK
- Genres: Indie rock, indie folk, alternative rock
- Years active: 2006–present
- Labels: Canvasback Music, Atlantic Records, Warner Music Group New World Records
- Members: Cathy Lucas; Justin Finch; Leon Beckenham; Simon Balthazar
- Past members: Amos Memon; Mark West; Giles J Davis
- Website: Official site

Fanfarlo are a London-based indie/alternative band formed in 2006 by Swedish musician Simon Balthazar. They fuse elements of folk, indie rock and post-punk using eclectic instrumentation including trumpet, violin, mandolin, musical saw, clarinet and saxophone. Since their formation they have released three studio albums and one EP.

== Background ==
The band, whose name comes from the Charles Baudelaire novella La Fanfarlo, started performing live in small London indie clubs in 2006, and released four limited edition 7" singles on London-based indie labels (one of which is a split single with Sleeping States) throughout 2006–2008.

Their debut album, Reservoir, was recorded in October/November 2008 at Tarquin Studios, Connecticut, USA and was produced by Peter Katis (The National, Interpol). The album was released in February 2009 on the band's own label Raffle Bat and later licensed to the Atlantic imprint Canvasback, who released it in the UK and US in October 2009 and in Europe in April 2010.

Their single "The Walls Are Coming Down" was released during September 2009. The music video for the single was directed by Iain Forsyth and Jane Pollard and features escape artist Roslyn Walker performing the Hanging Straitjacket Escape, a stunt first performed by Harry Houdini in the early 1900s. The stunt was also incorporated into the band's show at Webster Hall in New York on 19 December 2009 (this time by escape artist Michael Lee).

In early September 2011, the band announced on their website that their newest album, Rooms Filled with Light, was finished and posted a video of the first song, "Replicate". The album was released on 28 February 2012 in the United States, and on 27 February everywhere else.

In October 2013 the band released The Sea EP, which is the first part of a science-fiction/speculative/Utopian concept project. The lyrical content of this whole project presents a discussion about where humanity has come from (potentially), what we have become, and where we are heading. This is spoken of in terms of culture and science. The band have described their current sound as Space Opera meets Spaghetti Western.

On 10 February 2014 the band released their third regular studio album, titled Let's Go Extinct, on their own New World Records label.

In 2016, Balthazar collaborated with King Knut, as SWOON, and released the single "Heatwave". Since 2015, Lucas has been the lead singer and guitarist for the psychedelic pop group Vanishing Twin.

== Members ==
- Cathy Lucas – violin, keys, mandolin, glockenspiel, vocals, musical saw
- Justin Finch – bass, vocals
- Leon Beckenham – trumpet, keyboards, glockenspiel, melodica, vocals
- Simon Balthazar – vocals, guitar, keyboards, mandolin, saxophone, clarinet

== Former members ==
- Amos Memon – vocals, drums and percussion (2006-2013)
- Mark West – guitar, vocals, keyboard (2006-2009)

== In popular media ==
On 24 September 2009, the song "Ghosts" from the band's debut album, Reservoir, featured in episode 6 of season 6 of Grey's Anatomy. The band's 2007 single "Fire Escape" featured in episode 4 of season 6 of Fox's medical drama House on 12 October 2009.

On 15 February 2010, the band made their US television debut appearance on the Late Show with David Letterman performing their single "Harold T. Wilkins, or How to Wait for a Very Long Time". They have subsequently also performed on Last Call with Carson Daly, and on French TV channel Canal Plus.

Their song "Atlas" is featured on the soundtrack of 2010 film The Twilight Saga: Eclipse. The song was re-recorded in Austin, Texas especially for the film and was documented in Episode III of their web series, Under the Reservoir. Their song "Harold T. Wilkins, or How to Wait for a Very Long Time" featured in the soundtrack to the 2010 film Going the Distance. The song "I'm a Pilot" is featured in the NBC series Chuck season 4 episode 24.

== Web series ==
In March 2010, video artist Brian Gonzalez followed the band on their third time playing the SXSW music festival in Austin, Texas that resulted in a four-part web series entitled Under the Reservoir which premiered on their site 14 June 2010.

== Discography ==
=== Albums ===
- Reservoir (2009, Raffle Bat/Atlantic/Canvasback)
- Rooms Filled With Light (28 February 2012)
- The Sea EP (14 October 2013)
- Let's Go Extinct (10 February 2014)

=== Singles ===
- "Talking Backwards" (2006, Fortuna POP!)
- "You Are One of the Few Outsiders Who Really Understands Us" (2007, Label Fandango)
- "Fire Escape" (2007, White Heat)
- "Harold T. Wilkins" (2008, Felt Tip Records, split single with Sleeping States)
- "Drowning Men" (2009, Moshi Moshi Records)
- "The Walls Are Coming Down" (2009, Moshi Moshi Records)
- "Harold T. Wilkins, or How to Wait a Very Long Time" (2010, Atlantic Records)
- "You Are One"/"What Makes You Think You're the One" (2010 Record Store Day exclusive – limited to a pressing of 3,500 units, Atlantic Records)
- "Replicate" (2011, WGM)
- "Deconstruction" (17 October 2011, Canvasback/ATL; together with a 15-minute track "Reconstruction", as mp3 downloads only)
- "Shiny Things" (2012, digital download)
