= Slow Dazzle =

Slow Dazzle may refer to:

- Slow Dazzle (album), a 1975 album by John Cale
- Slow Dazzle (band), the performing alias of musical duo Shannon McArdle and Timothy Bracy
