= Adam Torres =

Adam Torres may refer to:

- Adam Torres (Degrassi: The Next Generation), a character on Degrassi: The Next Generation
- Adam Torres (singer), American singer and songwriter
