= From the Forest to the Sea =

Studio album by Southeast Engine
- Released: February 17, 2009
- Recorded: June 9 – 13, 2008
- Genres: Indie rock, folk rock
- Label: Misra Records

Southeast Engine chronology
A Wheel Within A Wheel (2007)	From the Forest to the Sea (2009)	Canary (2011)

Professional ratings
Review scores
Source	Rating
The A.V. Club	(B+) link
Cokemachine Glow	(81%) link
Paste	(7.4/10) link
PopMatters	link

From the Forest to the Sea is the fifth full-length recording by Southeast Engine, released in 2009 on Misra Records. The band recorded the album almost entirely live to analog tape in the abandoned auditorium of a middle school from the 19th century.

The album has been met mostly with critical praise. Review collation website Metacritic currently has From the Forest to the Sea listed at a weighted average of 84 percent.

This was the last album to feature keyboardist Michael Lachman; he was replaced by multi-instrumentalist Billy Matheny after his departure.

== Track listing ==
1. "The Forest Pt. I" – 3:02
2. "The Forest Pt. II" – 3:23
3. "The Forest Pt. III" – 3:09
4. "Law-Abiding Citizen" – 2:56
5. "Two of Every Kind" – 3:40
6. "Black Gold" – 4:12
7. "Easier Said Than Done" – 2:55
8. "Quest for Noah's Ark" – 4:53
9. "Preparing for the Flood" – 3:58
10. "Malcontent" - 2:08
11. "Sea of Galilee" - 3:57
12. "From the Roots of Your Mountains to Your Holy Temple" – 4:20

All songs written and performed by Southeast Engine.

== Personnel ==
- Adam Remnant: vocals, guitar, harmonica
- Jesse Remnant: bass, harmony vocals
- Michael Lachman: piano, Wandering Genie, organ
- Leo DeLuca: drums, percussion
