= The View from the Floor =

Studio album by Slow Dazzle
- Released: 2005
- Genre: Rock
- Length: 32:23
- Label: Misra Records

Professional ratings
Review scores
Source	Rating
Allmusic	3.5/5 stars
Pitchfork Media	5.8/10
PopMatters	7/10 stars

The View from the Floor is the 2005 debut album by Slow Dazzle.

== Track listing ==
1. "Fleur de Lis" (Shannon McArdle) – 3:13
2. "A Welfare State" (Timothy Bracy) – 3:32
3. "Wedding Dance" (McArdle) – 4:02
4. "The Prosecution Rests" (Bracy) – 4:55
5. "The Extent of My Remarks" (Bracy) – 3:27
6. "The View from the Floor" (McArdle) – 2:17
7. "Anthem" (Leonard Cohen) – 6:32
8. "Now or Never or Later" (Bracy) – 4:24

== Personnel ==
- Performed by Shannon McArdle, Timothy Bracy, and Peter Langland-Hassan
- Recorded by Peter Langland-Hassan
- Mastered by Vin Scialla at Avenue A Studios
- Layout and design by Dave Ewald
