= Let's Go Extinct =

Studio album by Fanfarlo
- Released: 10 February 2014
- Recorded: Wales, 2013
- Genre: Indie rock, alternative rock, dream pop
- Length: 58:54
- Label: New World Records (UK), Blue Horizon Ventures (US)
- Producer: David Wrench and Fanfarlo

Fanfarlo chronology
The Sea (EP) (2013)	Let's Go Extinct (2014)

Let's Go Extinct is the third regular album released the band Fanfarlo, released 10 February 2014 through New World Records (UK) and Blue Horizon Ventures (US). The album is loosely themed around the concept of evolution described by songwriter Balthazar as dealing with "the weirdness of being this thing we call a person and the double weirdness of other people".

The album received generally favourable reviews.

== Track listing ==
All tracks are written by Fanfarlo.

No.	Title	Length
1.	"Life In The Sky"	6:13
2.	"Cell Song"	4:18
3.	"Myth of Myself (A Ruse To Exploit Our Weaknesses)"	4:28
4.	"A Distance"	4:03
5.	"We're The Future"	4:43
6.	"Landlocked"	3:47
7.	"Painting With Life"	3:52
8.	"The Grey And Gold"	5:02
9.	"The Beginning And The End"	4:48
10.	"Let's Go Extinct"	5:59
11.	"White Mice" (bonus track)	5:07
12.	"A Distance (Tom Furse Extrapolation)" (bonus track)	6:38
Total length:		58:54

- Mastered by Ted Jensen at Sterling Sound, NYC
