= Deganwy =

Town and electoral ward in Wales

Coordinates: 53.298°N 3.831°W

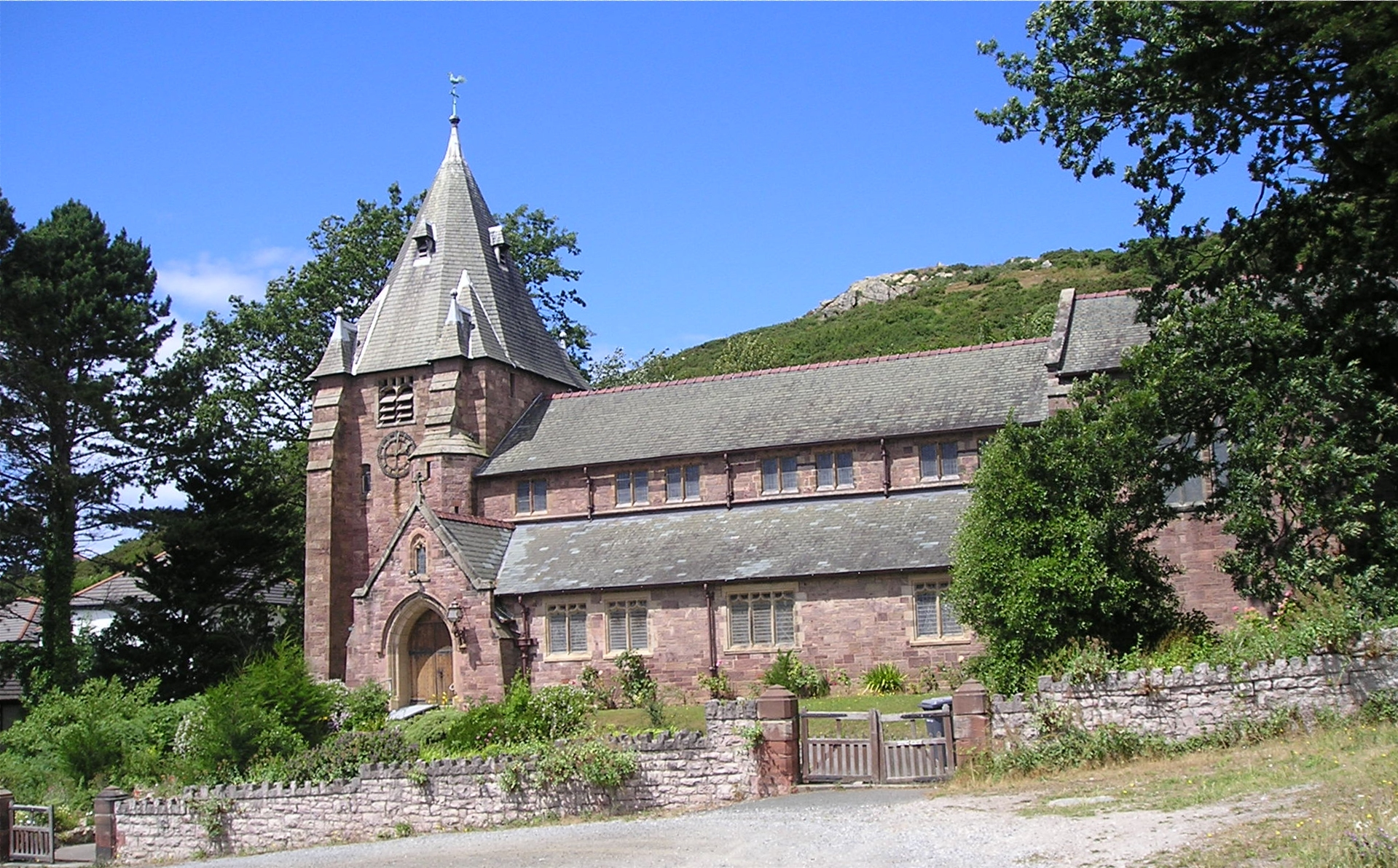
- Deganwy All Saints Church

- Location within Conwy
- Population: 3,936 (2011)
- OS grid reference: SH778795
- Community: Conwy
- Principal area: Conwy
- Preserved county: Clwyd
- Country: Wales
- Sovereign state: United Kingdom
- Post town: CONWY
- Postcode district: LL31
- Dialling code: 01492
- Police: North Wales
- Fire: North Wales
- Ambulance: Welsh
- UK Parliament: Bangor Aberconwy
- Senedd Cymru – Welsh Parliament: Bangor Conwy Môn

Deganwy is a town and electoral ward in the community of Conwy in Conwy County Borough in Wales. It lies in the Creuddyn Peninsula alongside Llandudno (to the north) and Rhos-on-Sea (to its east). Historically part of Caernarfonshire, the peninsula is in a region of north Wales where as many as 1 in 3 residents can speak Welsh, and is home to some of the most expensive streets in Wales. Deganwy is located on the east bank of the River Conwy. The original wooden castle was rebuilt in stone after 1210. Deganwy is in the ecclesiastical parish of Llanrhos, and has a Victorian era Gothic parish church dedicated to All Saints.

The name Deganwy has been interpreted in modern times as Din-Gonwy, which would mean "Fort on the River Conwy", but the historical spellings make it impossible for this to be the actual origin of the name although mentioned in Domesday Book is "the territory of the Decanae tribe". In Middle Welsh, it was written as Degannwy, and in Brythonic as *Decantouion.

Deganwy formed part of the ancient borough of Conwy from medieval times. The borough was reformed to become a municipal borough in 1877 and was converted into a community in 1974. Deganwy forms part of the Conwy built-up area as defined by the Office for National Statistics, and forms part of the Conwy post town.

== Deganwy Castle ==
Deganwy's most notable feature is Deganwy Castle, situated 110 m above the town, which, in the 6th century was fortified as the stronghold of Maelgwn Gwynedd, king of Gwynedd. Deganwy appears to have been the capital of Gwynedd at this time, but this was later moved to Aberffraw on Anglesey. The hill on which the castle was built was fortified many times over the centuries. It was the site of a Norman castle built around 1082 and occupied by Robert of Rhuddlan, and later by Llywelyn the Great and Llywelyn ap Gruffudd. The castle was later demolished by Llywelyn ap Gruffydd in 1263 so that only ruins remain today.

== Rail and sea ==
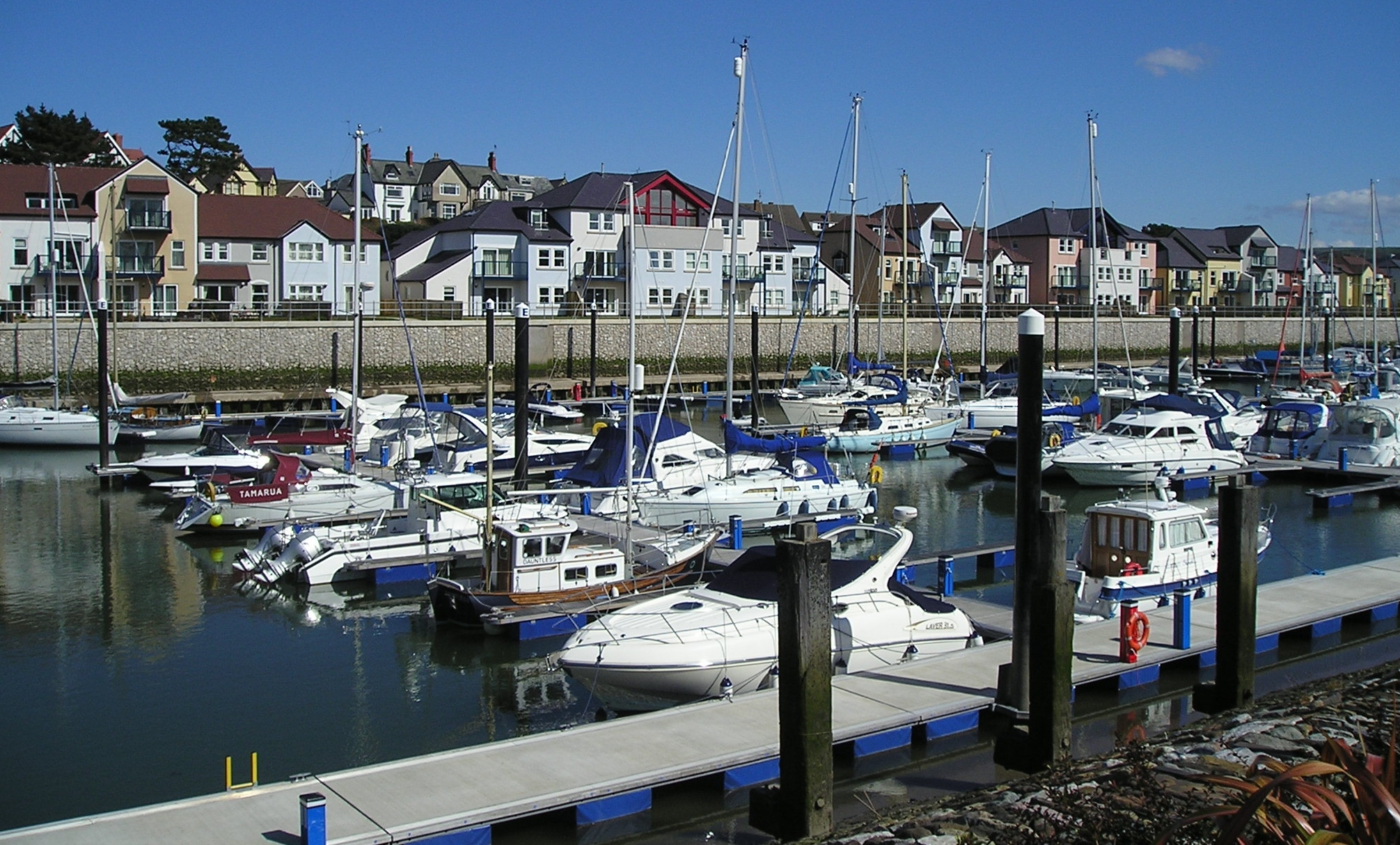
Deganwy Marina

Deganwy has a railway station on the Llandudno branch line with an hourly train service to and from Manchester Piccadilly and intermediate stations. The London & North Western Railway built at Deganwy a rail-connected riverside quay and wharves (occasionally referred to as St George's Dock), largely for the purpose of exporting slate by coastal steamer. The slate was brought by rail from Blaenau Ffestiniog. A marina with its accompanying housing and hotel accommodation was established on the site of the former slate wharfs early in the 21st century.

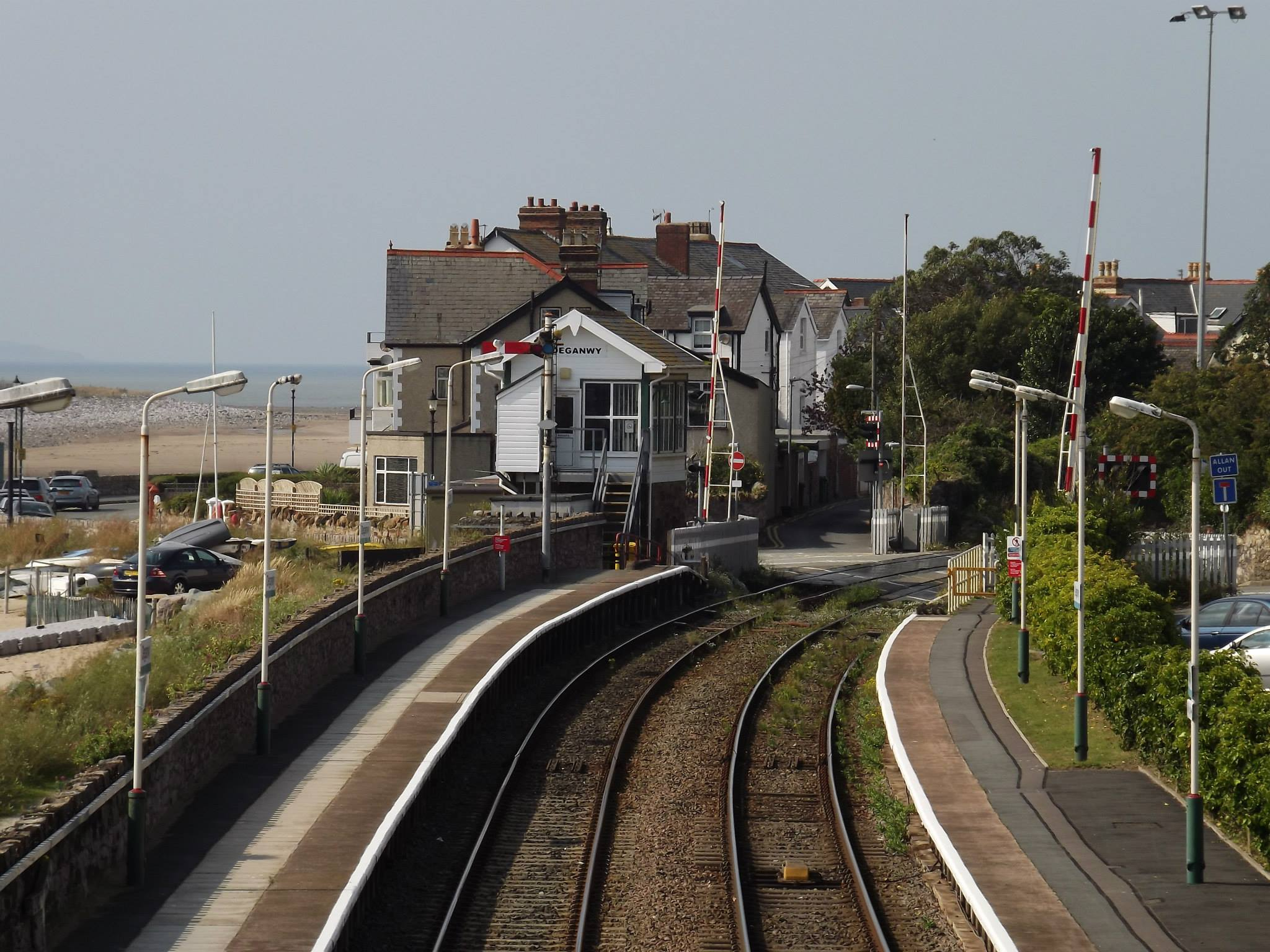
View from the station footbridge looking north.

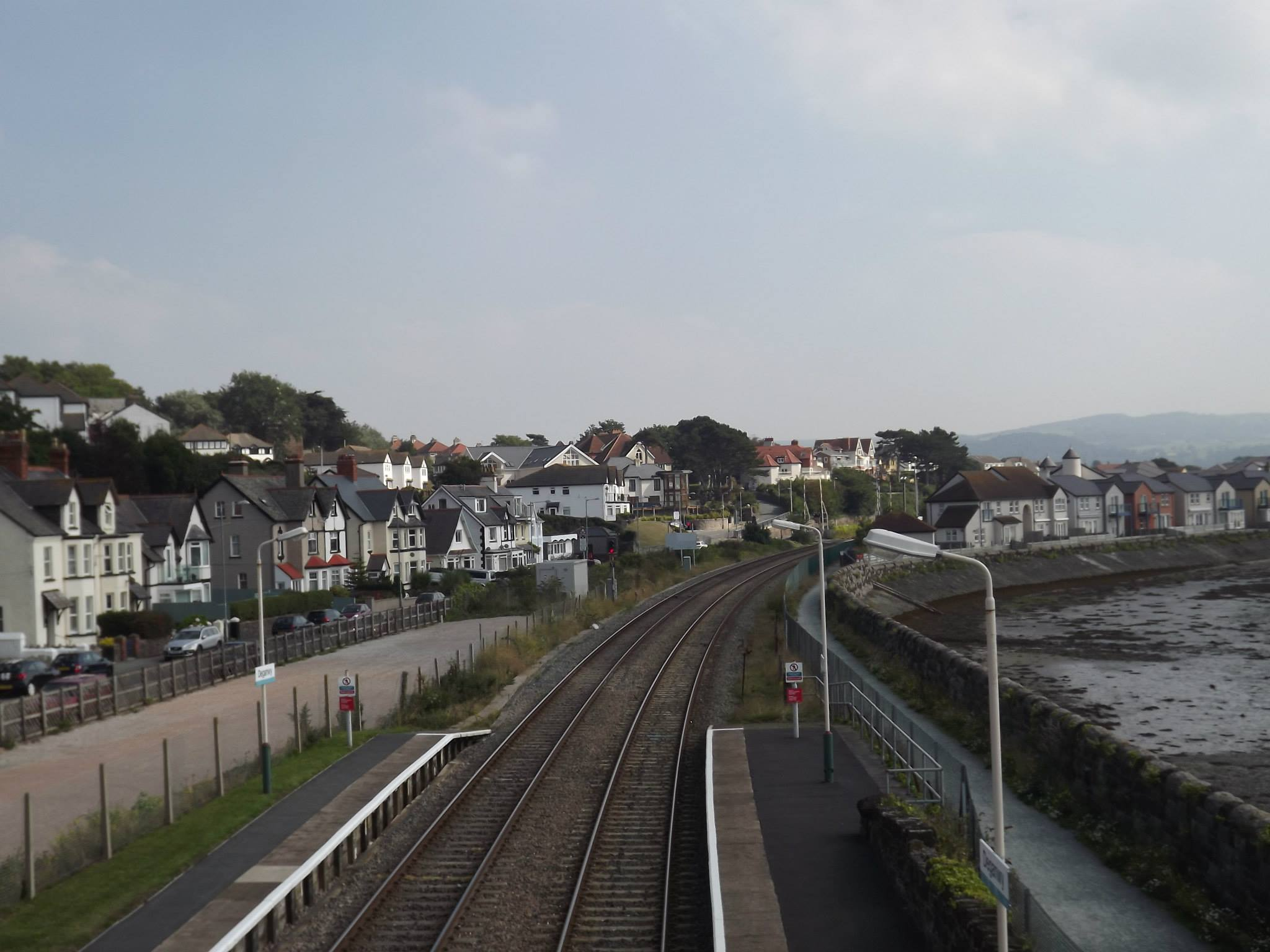
View from the station footbridge looking south.

== Governance ==
Deganwy electoral ward elects two county councillors to Conwy County Borough Council and four town councillors to Conwy Town Council.

== Education ==
Deganwy has one bilingual primary school, Ysgol Deganwy.

== Sport ==
The third stage of the Tour of Britain Women's cycle race passed through Deganwy in 2026.

== See also ==
- All Saints Church, Deganwy
