= Conwy Hospital =

- Conwy & Denbighshire NHS Trust
- Shown in Conwy County Borough

Geography
- Location: Conwy, Conwy County Borough, Wales, United Kingdom
- Coordinates: 53.2855°N 3.8451°W

Organisation
- Care system: Public NHS
- Type: Community hospital

History
- Founded: 1838
- Closed: 2003

Links
- Lists: Hospitals in Wales

Conwy Hospital (Welsh: Ysbyty Conwy) was a community hospital in Conwy, Wales. It was managed by the Conwy & Denbighshire NHS Trust.

== History ==
The hospital had its origins in the Conwy Union Workhouse and Infirmary which was established in 1838. It became the St Mary's and Dolwaen Public Assistance Institution in 1930 and then joined the National Health Service as the Conway Hospital for Aged Sick in 1948. After the hospital closed in 2003, the buildings were demolished in 2004 and the site was redeveloped for residential use.
