= The Mendoza Line (band) =

American rock band

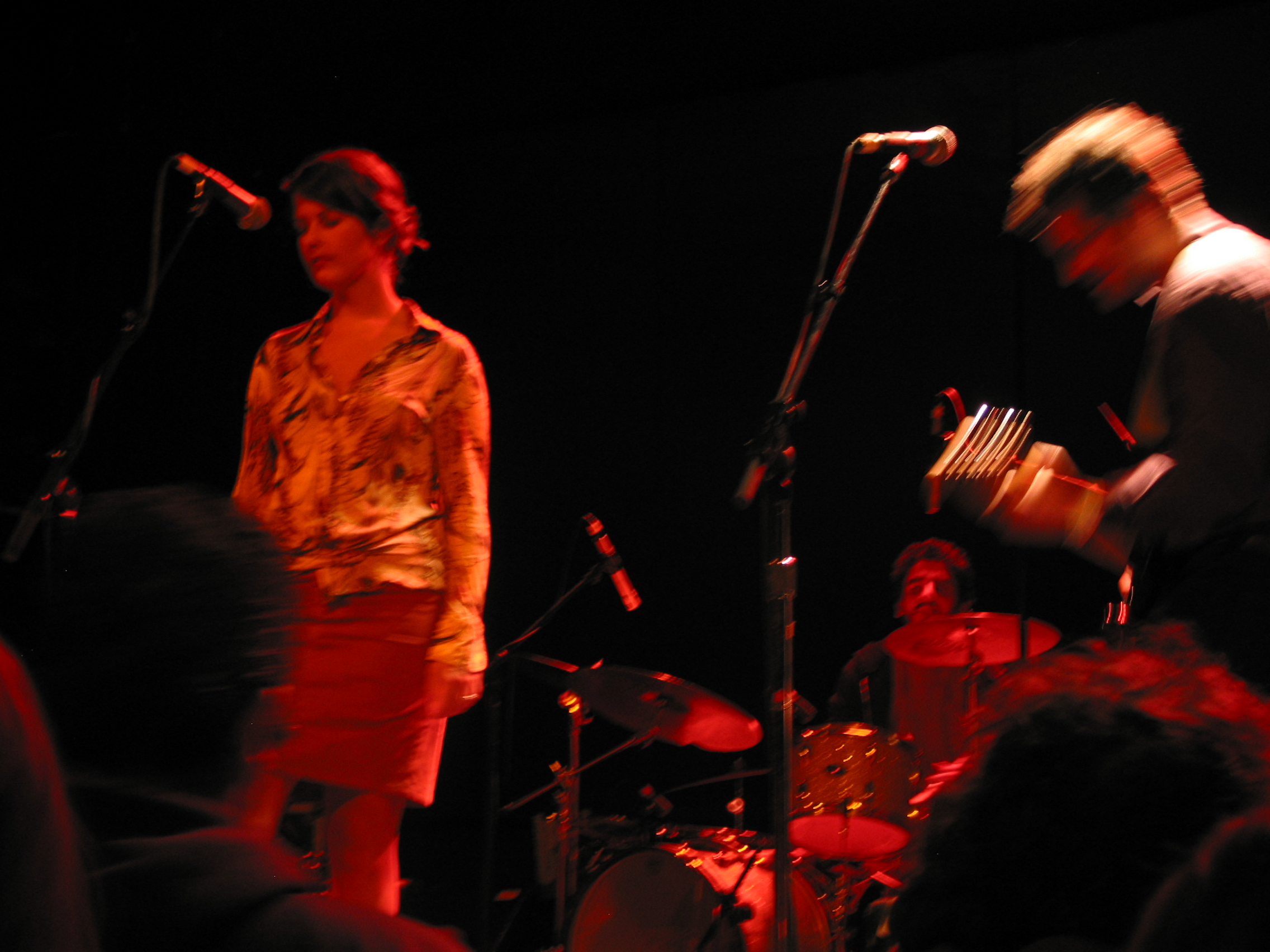
- The Mendoza Line at the Bowery Ballroom, October 2006

Background information
- Origin: Athens, Georgia, United States
- Genres: Indie rock, alternative country
- Years active: 1996–2007
- Labels: Kindercore, Misra, Bar/None, Loose Music, Low Transit Industries

The Mendoza Line was an American rock band formed in the mid-1990s in Athens, Georgia, and who eventually settled in Brooklyn, New York. Their name comes from a characterization of an intolerably low batting average (.200), based on the dismal .215 batting average of Mario Mendoza. They released eight full albums of sometimes folky, occasionally country-styled indie rock that is influenced by classic songwriters like Bob Dylan, John Cale and Paul Westerberg and alt-country bands like Whiskeytown and Wilco. They recorded for several labels, such as Kindercore, Misra, Bar/None Records and Loose Music.

== History ==
Although their first recordings were issued by Kindercore Records, a label whose artists leaned towards sunny Beach Boys and Zombies-style pop, their early sound was more influenced by noisier acts like The Replacements and The Mekons. Over the years, the band has featured not one but several songwriters; the band's original musical cornerstone was the songs of founding members Timothy Bracy and Peter Hoffman. Other members included Lori Carrier, Margaret Maurice, Paul Deppler and Andres Galdames.

In 2000, Shannon McArdle joined the outfit, and became a major contributor to the songwriting, beginning with that year's We're All In This Alone. 2002's Lost In Revelry continued the string of favorably reviewed, but poor-selling albums. Drummer Sean Fogarty joined the band in 2002, along with John Troutman on the guitar and pedal steel.

After 2004's Fortune, Hoffman took a hiatus from the band, while Bracy and McArdle were married in 2005. That year the couple released an album, the more electronica-dappled The View From The Floor, as a duo under the name Slow Dazzle. Entertainment Weekly declared that 2005's Full of Light And Full of Fire contained "the prettiest protest songs imaginable."

In a turn of events that recalls the story of their songwriting heroes Richard and Linda Thompson, Bracy and McArdle announced their divorce in 2007. The band issued a final recording called 30 Year Low, along with a bonus disc combining covers, live tracks and rarities in August 2007.

In 2020, the band announced a digital and vinyl re-release of We're All In This Alone to commemorate the 20th Anniversary of the record.

== Recordings ==
By the Mendoza Line:

- Poems To A Pawnshop (1997) (Kindercore)
- Like Someone In Love (1998) (Kindercore) [EP]
- I Like You When You're Not Around (1999) (Kindercore)
- We're All In This Alone (2000) (Bar/None)
- Lost In Revelry (2002) (Misra)
- If They Knew This Was The End (2003) (Bar/None) [compilation of songs from Poems to a Pawnshop and Like Someone in Love plus bonus tracks]
- Fortune (2004) (Bar/None)
- Sent Down To AA (2004) (Misra) [compilation of rarities, live tracks, outtakes, etc.]
- Full Of Light And Full Of Fire (2005) (Misra/Loose Music/Low Transit Industries)
- 30 Year Low (2007) (Glurp/Low Transit Industries) [double CD - disc one is 30 Year Low, an EP - disc two is titled Final Reflections of the Legendary Malcontent and contains rarities, live cuts, etc.]

By Slow Dazzle

- The View From the Floor (2005) (Misra) [featuring Timothy Bracy, Shannon McArdle, & Peter Laqngland-Hassan]

By Shannon McArdle:

- Summer of the Whore (2008) (Bar/None) [featuring former Mendoza Line members/contributors Adam Gold, Clint Newman, Peter Laqngland-Hassan, Philip McArdle]
- Fear the Dream of Axes (2012) (Bar/None) [featuring former Mendoza Line members/contributors Adam Gold & Clint Newman]
- A Touch of Class (2018)
