= Water Liars =

Water Liars is an American rock band from Water Valley, Mississippi, that included songwriter/vocalist/guitarist Justin Peter Kinkel-Schuster, drummer/producer/multi-instrumentalist Andrew Bryant, and bassist GR Robinson. Their name is derived from the first story in Barry Hannah's collection Airships.

== History ==
Bryant was on a solo tour in the mid-2000s with Matt Arbogast from The Gunshy. Justin Peter Kinkel-Schuster lived in St. Louis at the time and was playing with a band called Theodore. Theodore was the show's opener that night. "We hit it off, stayed in touch and over the years, we played whenever we could," Kinkel-Schuster said in an interview with A Beer with the Band.

=== Phantom Limb (2011–2012) ===
In 2011, on a whim, Kinkel-Schuster went to visit Bryant in Bryant's hometown of Water Valley, Mississippi. They began writing songs and in three days the duo had recorded, with only one microphone, what would be their first full-length record as Water Liars, Phantom Limb. The record was originally released on February 28, 2012, by Pennsylvania record label Misra Records. According to the Misra website, "Misra initially planned to work with Theodore and, assuming the Phantom Limb songs were mere outtakes under a different name, the Water Liars demos initially got pushed to the back burner. Kinkel-Schuster pleasantly persisted, however, insisting the project was vastly different and Misra must hear it. The label took to the recordings and released Phantom Limb." The record features 10 songs which feature a heavy distorted guitar sound, field recordings of frogs singing in a train yard and a sample of British occultist Aleister Crowley's recitation of his poem "Atomic Ritual."

=== Wyoming (2013) ===
A year later, on March 5, 2013, Water Liars released their sophomore effort, Wyoming, on Big Legal Mess, an independent label in Oxford, Mississippi, with affiliations to Fat Possum Records. Wyoming was recorded in Water Valley at Dial Back Sounds in six days, tracking for three and mixing for three. Bruce Watson, whose previous credits include work with A.A. Bondy, engineered the record. This record includes Matt Patton of Drive-By Truckers on bass. The record features nine songs. "Wyoming hopefully represents something larger or represents a place inside of me or whoever. It's less of a specific place and more of a strange American place that you want to get to but don't really ever," Kinkel-Schuster said of the naming of the record.

=== Water Liars (2014) ===
On March 3, 2014, Water Liars released their third record on Big Legal Mess/Fat Possum. The eleven song record was recorded at Dial Back Sounds in ten days over the course of three months on the weekends with Kinkel-Schuster commuting from Louisville, Kentucky. This is the first record to feature bassist and Water Liars' touring musician, GR Robinson. According to Paste magazine, "The self-titled release maintains the band's raw aesthetic, emphasizing their evolution since Wyoming without feeling over-produced or manufactured. Finding art in contradiction, Water Liars combines violent, vivid lyrics with sentimental undertones, making for a rough yet deeply moving collection of songs that not only make for great listening, but incite a kind of curiosity in the listener that can only be attributed to this multi-dimentional lyricism."

=== Roll On (2020) ===
The band's "lost album" was released on July 3, 2020 on Kinkel-Schuster's newly launched record label Constant Stranger. Originally recorded in 2015 with Matt Pence at Echo Lab in Argyle, Texas, the 10-track album was never released due to a series of mishaps, including their label collapsing. The band broke up shortly after. “Roll On” was produced and recorded as a platform to launch the band towards more commercial success, while staying true to their style and songwriting traditions. Matt Ruppert, writing for These Subtle Sounds, describes the album as "a rock and roll record, writ large and as thunderous as a lightning-bright hailstorm, alternating between crashing and calm."

== Influences ==
Kinkel-Schuster grew up in Greenwood, Arkansas, and Bryant was raised in the church in Mississippi. Both cite the South as a major influence in their writing and songs. "I don't know how you could be from a certain place or area or region and not have it affect the way that you see things. Some places it's inevitable that that will happen. We cultivate it, too, and we're proud of it. It's definitely in there, but it's not like where we're from is the only thing that defines what we're trying to do. But it's in there. It's deep in there and it's not going anywhere," Kinkel-Schuster said.

The late Jason Molina of the band Songs: Ohia is also a great influence, "If you're gonna say there's one thing that influenced what I do now, it has to be the drum sounds. Because I play a lot like that guy does. My favorite style of drumming is on their records. I definitely model what I do after that. I mean, I don't try to do what they do, but that's just the way I like to play. It's just got that kind of '90s sound to it. Maybe also mixed with shit I heard my dad listening to in the car when I was a kid, which was probably '70s music," Bryant said.

They are also influenced by many Southern writers, including Barry Hannah, Frank Stanford, and Flannery O'Conner.

== Members ==
- Justin Peter Kinkel-Schuster – vocals, guitar
- Andrew Bryant – vocals, drums, piano, organ
- GR Robinson – bass
- Kell Kellum - guitar, pedal steel
- Len Clark - drums

== Discography ==
Release date	Title
February 28, 2012	Phantom Limb
March 5, 2013	Wyoming
2013	Moon Over Madison (7")
March 3, 2014	Water Liars
April 22, 2014	Farewell Transmission: The Music of Jason Molina
July 3, 2020	Roll On
