= Summer Hymns =

Summer Hymns is a band based in Athens, Georgia.

Summer Hymns was formed in 1997 by singer/guitarist Zachary Gresham and drummer Philip Brown, both formerly of mid-1990s Athens favorites, Joe Christmas. Guitarist Bren Mead, of Masters of the Hemisphere, bassist Derek Almstead and keyboardist Dottie Alexander, both from Of Montreal, and multi-instrumentalist Adrian Finch completed the early lineup. The debut Summer Hymns single, "Half Sick of Shadows" b/w "Lucky" was released by Made in Mexico in 1999.

Summer Hymns' first full-length, Voice Brother and Sister was released by Misra Records to widespread critical acclaim in 2000. A Celebratory Arm Gesture was released in spring 2001. A year later, Summer Hymns underwent a personnel shift and comprised Gresham, Brown, and Matt Dawson (bass) and Matt "Pistol" Stoessel (pedal steel guitar). The new Summer Hymns lineup recorded the band's third album, Clemency, with Lambchop's Mark Nevers in 2003. New songs written in 2003 while awaiting the release of Clemency were collected an EP, Value Series, Vol. 1: Fools Gold, released in late 2003. Two years later, in November 2006, after another major personnel change, Summer Hymns released Backward Masks, again on Misra. It featured the debut of ex-Pine State guitarist Chris Riser on bass and keys.

The core trio's live show is often augmented with additional musicians, including Bryan Nuse (Wet Meadows) on guitar and percussion, Jimmy Hughes (Elf Power, Folklore) on guitar, David Specht (Quiet Hooves) on keyboard, and Aaron Jolley (Folklore, Dark Meat, The Lickety Splits) on horns and percussion.

== Recordings ==
- "Half Sick of Shadows" b/w "Lucky" seven-inch single (Made in Mexico Records, 1999)
- Voice Brother and Sister (Misra Records, 2000)
- A Celebratory Arm Gesture (Misra Records, 2001)
- Clemency (Misra Records, 2003)
- EP Value Series Vol. 1: Fools Gold (Misra Records, 2003)
- Backward Masks (Misra Records, 2006)

== Compilation CDs ==
- "Stick and Leaf" appears on Appetizers and Leftovers, released by Austin's I Eat Records.
- "What Kind of Bird" appears on the 2006 AthFest 10th Anniversary compilation CD.
- "Bombay Brown Indian Ink" (live acoustic version) appears on WUOG Live in the Lobby CD compilation of live radio performances.
