= Motel Beds =

American musical band

- Origin: Dayton, Ohio, United States
- Genres: Indie rock, garage-rock
- Years active: 2004 - present
- Members: PJ Paslosky; Tommy Cooper; Derl Robbins; Tod Weidner; Ian Kaplan

Motel Beds are an indie rock band from Dayton, Ohio.

== History ==
The band was initially formed in the early 2000s by singer P.J. Paslosky, guitarist Tommy Cooper and drummer Ian Kaplan. The band went on hiatus soon after but reformed in 2008.

Their first release with Misra Records was These Are the Days Gone By, a collection of previously released tracks which were remastered by Carl Saff along with two unreleased tracks. The album features "Tropics of the Sand" with Kelley Deal of The Breeders and a cover of Matthew Sweet's "I've Been Waiting".

After leaving Misra, they recorded Mind Glitter for Anyway Records an album PopMatters called "their best album to date."

After the release of Mind Glitter, the band quietly went on hiatus partially thanks to the move of bassist Tod Weidner across the country, until a reunion show in Dayton was announced to be performed July 19, 2024.

=== Band members ===
- PJ Paslosky (vocals)
- Tommy Cooper (guitar)
- Derl Robbins (guitar)
- Tod Weidner (bass)
- Ian Kaplan (drums)

== Discography ==
Splits and Compilations

- Motel Beds/Nate Farley & The Firewatchers (2016) Record Store Day release

EPs

- Hasta Mañana EP (2004)
- Go for a Dive (2009)

Full-length LPs

- Moondazed (2010)
- Feelings (2010)
- Sunfried Dreams (2011)
- Tango Boys (2011)
- Dumb Gold (2012)
- These Are the Days Gone By (2014) Misra Records
- Mind Glitter (2015) Anyway Records
