= All Saints Church, Deganwy =

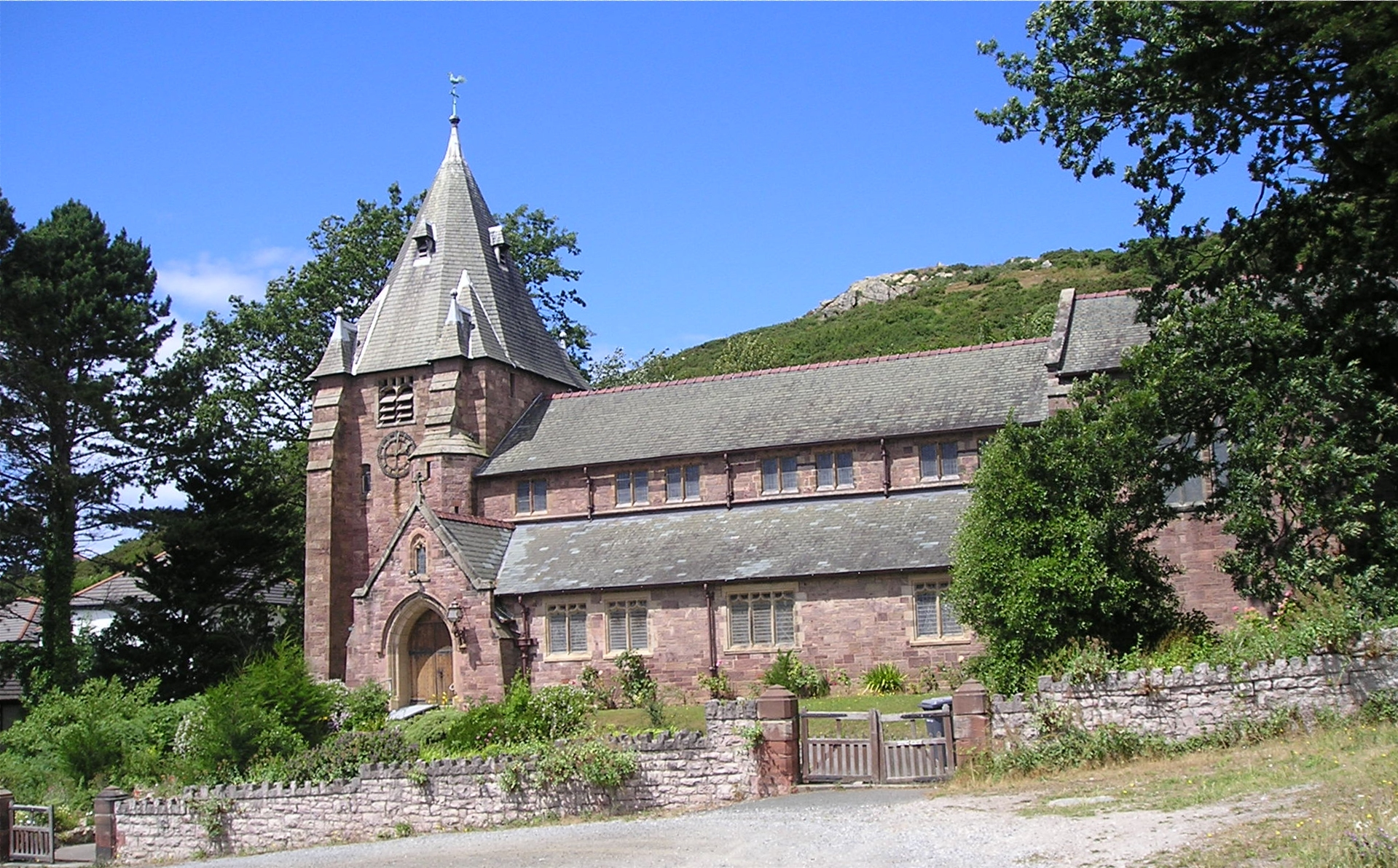
- All Saints Church, Deganwy, from the south
- All Saints Church, Deganwy
- 53.2941°N 3.8270°W
- Location: Deganwy, Conwy County Borough
- Country: Wales
- Denomination: Church in Wales
- Website: All Saints, Deganwy

History
- Founder: Lady Augusta Mostyn
- Dedication: All Saints

Architecture
- Functional status: Active
- Heritage designation: Grade II*
- Designated: 24 June 1986
- Architect: John Douglas
- Architectural type: Church
- Style: Gothic Revival
- Groundbreaking: 1897
- Completed: 1899

Administration
- Province: Wales
- Diocese: St Asaph
- Archdeaconry: St Asaph
- Deanery: Llanrwst
- Parish: Eglwysrhos (or Llanrhos)

Clergy
- Priest: Revd Pam Wright

All Saints Church, Deganwy, is an Anglican church in the town of Deganwy, Wales, on a site overlooking the Conwy estuary (grid reference SH783790).

== Description ==
It is an active Anglican church in the benefice of Eglwysrhos (or Llanrhos), the deanery of Llanrwst, the archdeaconry of St Asaph, and the diocese of St Asaph. It is designed by Cadw as a Grade II* listed building.

The church was built as a memorial church by Lady Augusta Mostyn to a design by John Douglas of Chester on a site overlooking the Conwy estuary. It has a clerestory, a chancel higher than the nave, and a west tower.

== Organ ==
The two-manual organ was built by Alex Young and Sons of Manchester in 1899, and it was modified by L. Reeves in 1972.

== See also ==
- List of new churches by John Douglas
