= Reservoir (Fanfarlo album) =

Studio album by Fanfarlo
- Released: April 2009 (UK); 29 September 2009 (USA)
- Recorded: 2008
- Genre: Indie pop, indie folk
- Length: 42:04
- Label: Raffle Bat (UK); Atlantic (USA)
- Producer: Peter Katis, Fanfarlo

Fanfarlo chronology
Reservoir (2009)	Rooms Filled with Light (2012)

Professional ratings
Review scores
Source	Rating
Allmusic	3/5 stars
NME	8/10 stars
The Skinny	4/5 stars

Reservoir is the debut album by the London-based indie folk band Fanfarlo, released in 2009. The album was recorded in October and November 2008 at Tarquin Studios in Bridgeport, Connecticut, United States and was produced by Peter Katis. It includes the band's featured singles "Fire Escape" and "Harold T. Wilkins, or How to Wait for a Very Long Time", which were released on preceding EPs. Three further singles, "Drowning Men", "The Walls Are Coming Down" and "I'm a Pilot", were released from the album in the summer of 2009.

== Cover art ==
Sigur Rós's singer Jón Þór Birgisson suggested Lilja Birgisdottir, his sister, to Czech photographer Jan Saudek when they were looking for art for the album cover. Fanfarlo chose a photograph which contained Sigurrós, the little sister of Jón Þór Birgisson, and the namesake of the band Sigur Rós.

== Limited edition ==
In the UK, a "strictly limited" edition red box-set version of the album was released to a selection of independent record stores, containing numerous art cards and the album tied with red and white string.

== Release ==
The album was released by Raffle Bat Records in the United Kingdom in April 2009.

The album was released on 29 September 2009 in the United States on Canvasback Records, a subsidiary of Atlantic Records. The American release features a gray-tinted version of the cover photograph and contains no interior booklet. To promote the album in the United States, Atlantic Records released a single for "Harold T. Wilkins, or How to Wait for a Very Long Time" in January 2010 and funded a new music video for the song.

== Track listing ==
1. "I'm a Pilot" – 4:30
2. "Ghosts" – 4:18
3. "Luna" – 4:36
4. "Comets" – 5:44
5. "Fire Escape" – 2:59
6. "The Walls Are Coming Down" – 4:15
7. "Drowning Men" – 4:15
8. "If It Is Growing" – 2:43
9. "Harold T. Wilkins, or How to Wait for a Very Long Time" – 4:02
10. "Finish Line" – 3:40
11. "Good Morning Midnight" – 1:26
12. "Sand and Ice" (bonus track) – 4:18
