= Phil Waldorf =

American music industry executive (born 1974)

Phil Waldorf (born 1974) is an American music industry executive.

== Biography ==
Waldorf is co-owner and Chief Marketing Officer of Secretly Group, a global entity comprising four record labels and a music publisher that represents artists, writers, film makers, producers and comedians.

Waldorf began his music industry career as a student at the University of Georgia, where he was music director of WUOG, the student radio station. During that time, he lived at the Athens, Georgia, home known as the Landfill, where he often booked local indie rock musicians such as Neutral Milk Hotel and Olivia Tremor Control (members of the Elephant 6 collective), as well as out-of-town touring bands, to play live shows.

After moving to Brooklyn, New York, from Athens in 1998, Waldorf worked at the record store Other Music. In 1999, Waldorf became founding label manager of independent record label Misra; as the public face of the label, which was under other ownership, he headed its operations and A&R until 2006. Waldorf moved the label from Brooklyn to Austin, Texas, in 2003, where in 2005 he also began to book live music part-time at the rock club Emo's.

In 2007 Waldorf left Misra and Emo's to become the president of Dead Oceans, an independent record label founded in partnership with the owners of labels Secretly Canadian and Jagjaguwar of Bloomington, Indiana. The coalition later became Secretly Group.
