= Conwy =

Walled market town in Wales

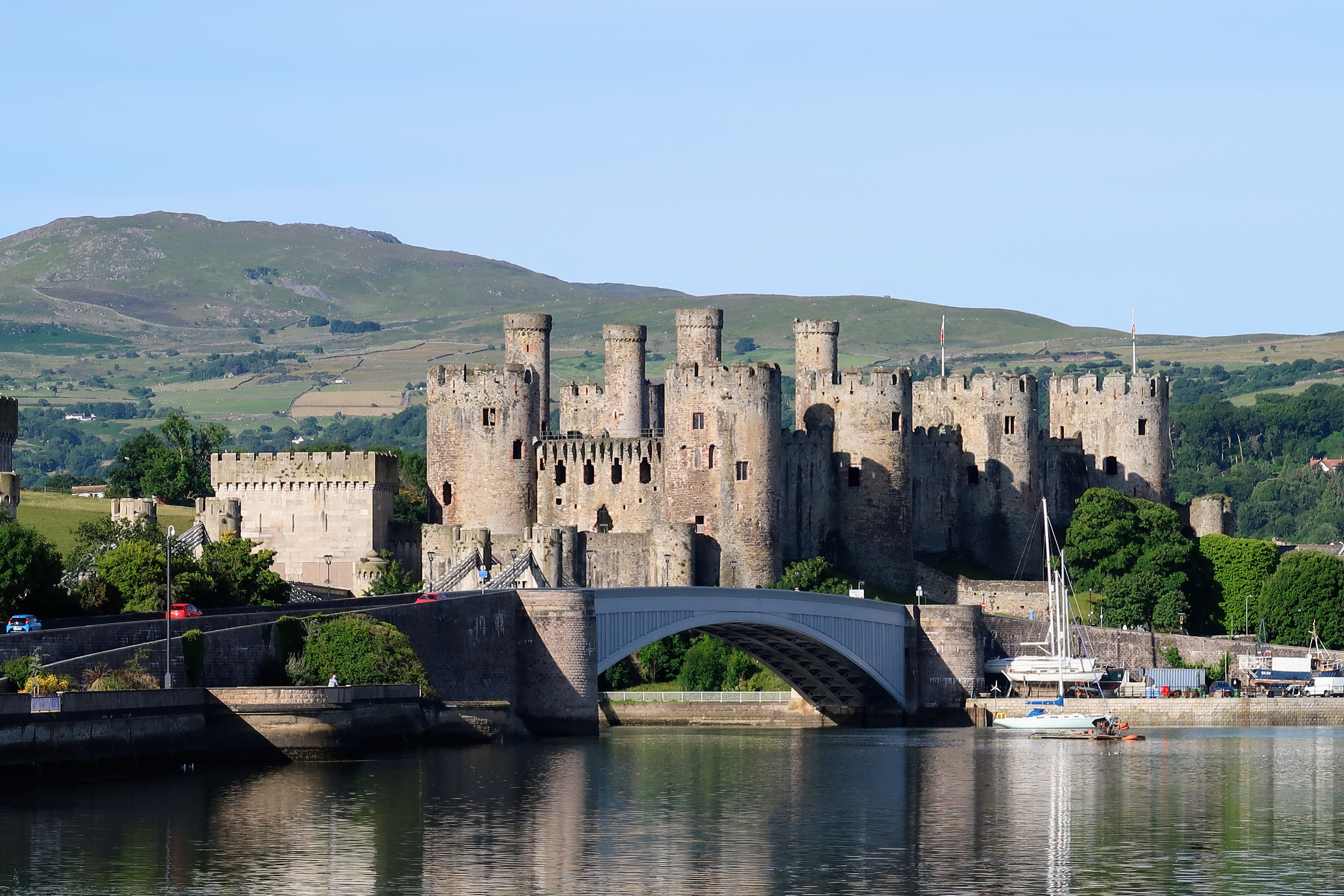
- Conwy Castle and the three bridges over the River Conwy

- Location within Conwy
- Population: 14,723 (2011)
- OS grid reference: SH775775
- Community: Conwy
- Principal area: Conwy
- Preserved county: Clwyd
- Country: Wales
- Sovereign state: United Kingdom
- Post town: CONWY
- Postcode district: LL31, LL32
- Dialling code: 01492
- Police: North Wales
- Fire: North Wales
- Ambulance: Welsh
- UK Parliament: Bangor Aberconwy
- Senedd Cymru – Welsh Parliament: Bangor Conwy Môn
- Website: conwytowncouncil.gov.uk
- List of places UK Wales Conwy 53.28°N 3.83°W Map of the community

Conwy (/ˈkɒnwi/, Welsh: [ˈkɔnʊɨ]), previously known in English as Conway, is a walled market town, a community and the administrative centre of Conwy County Borough in North Wales. The walled town and castle stand on the west bank of the River Conwy, facing Deganwy on the east bank. The town formerly lay in Gwynedd, and before that in Caernarfonshire. The community, which also includes Deganwy and Llandudno Junction, had a population of 14,753 at the 2011 census.

Postal addresses do not follow the community boundaries. On the east bank of the river, Deganwy forms part of the Conwy post town, but Llandudno Junction is a separate post town. The ward on the west bank of the river had a population of 4,065 at the 2011 census.

The resident population of the wider Conwy County Borough was estimated by the Office for National Statistics to be 116,200.

The name 'Conwy' derives from the old Welsh words cyn (chief) and gwy (water), the river being originally called the 'Cynwy'.

== History ==
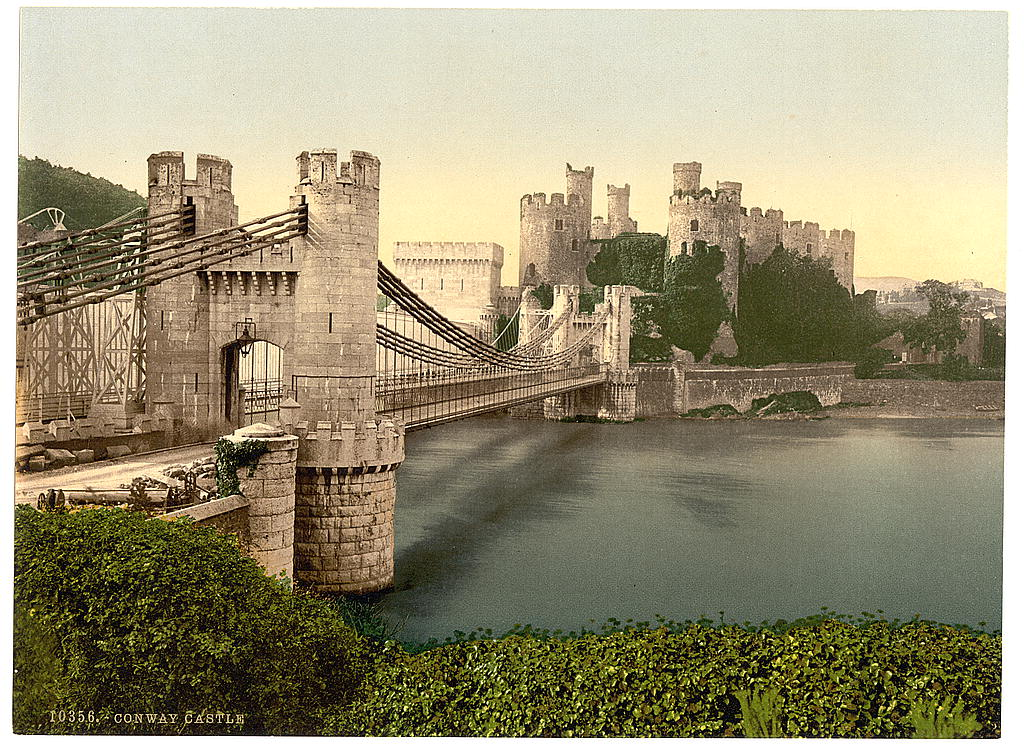
"Castle and suspension bridge", c. 1890–1900.

=== Castle and town walls ===
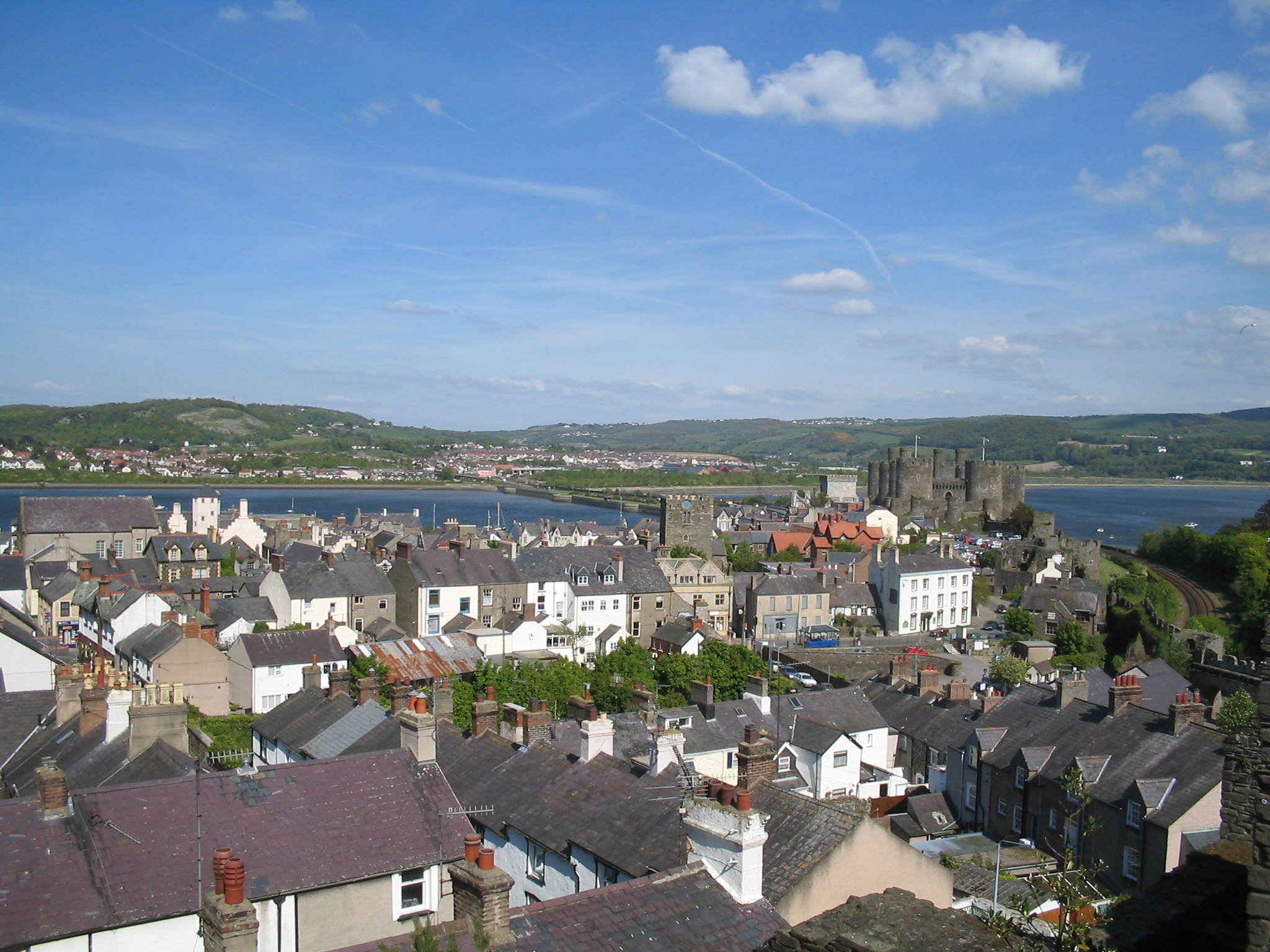
A view of the original walled town, from one of the towers of town walls.

Conwy Castle and the town walls were built, on the instructions of Edward I of England, between 1283 and 1289, as part of his conquest of the principality of Wales. The church standing in Conwy has been marked as the oldest building in Conwy and has stood in the walls of Conwy since the 14th century. However, the oldest structure is part of the town walls, at the southern end of the east side. Here one wall and the tower of a llys (palace/court house) belonging to Llywelyn the Great and his grandson Llywelyn ap Gruffydd have been incorporated into the wall. Built on a rocky outcrop, it has a prominent apsidal tower.

The walls are part of a World Heritage Site, Castles and Town Walls of King Edward in Gwynedd.

People born within the town walls of Conwy are nicknamed "Jackdaws", after the jackdaws which live on the walls there. A Jackdaw Society existed until 2011.

The population of the town in 1841 was 1,358.

=== Abbey ===
Conwy was the original site of Aberconwy Abbey, founded by Llywelyn the Great. Edward and his troops took over the abbey site and moved the monks up the Conwy valley to a new site at Maenan, establishing Maenan Abbey. The parish church St Mary & All Saints still retains some parts of the original abbey church in the east and west walls.

=== Suspension bridge ===
Conwy has other tourist attractions. Conwy Suspension Bridge, designed by Thomas Telford to replace the ferry, was completed in 1826 and spans the River Conwy next to the castle. Telford designed the bridge's supporting towers to match the castle's turrets. The bridge is now open to pedestrians only and, together with the toll-keeper's house, is in the care of the National Trust.

=== Railway bridge ===
The Conwy Railway Bridge, a tubular bridge, was built for the Chester and Holyhead Railway by Robert Stephenson. The first tube was completed in 1848, the second in 1849. The bridge is still in use on the North Wales Coast Line, along with the station, which is located within the town walls. In addition to a modern bridge serving the town, the A55 road passes under the river in a tunnel, Britain's first immersed tube tunnel, which was built between 1986 and 1991. The old mountain road to Dwygyfylchi and Penmaenmawr runs through the Sychnant Pass, at the foot of Conwy Mountain.

=== Aberconwy House ===
The National Trust owns Aberconwy House, which is Conwy's only surviving 14th-century merchant's house, one of the first buildings built inside the walls of Conwy.

=== Plas Mawr ===
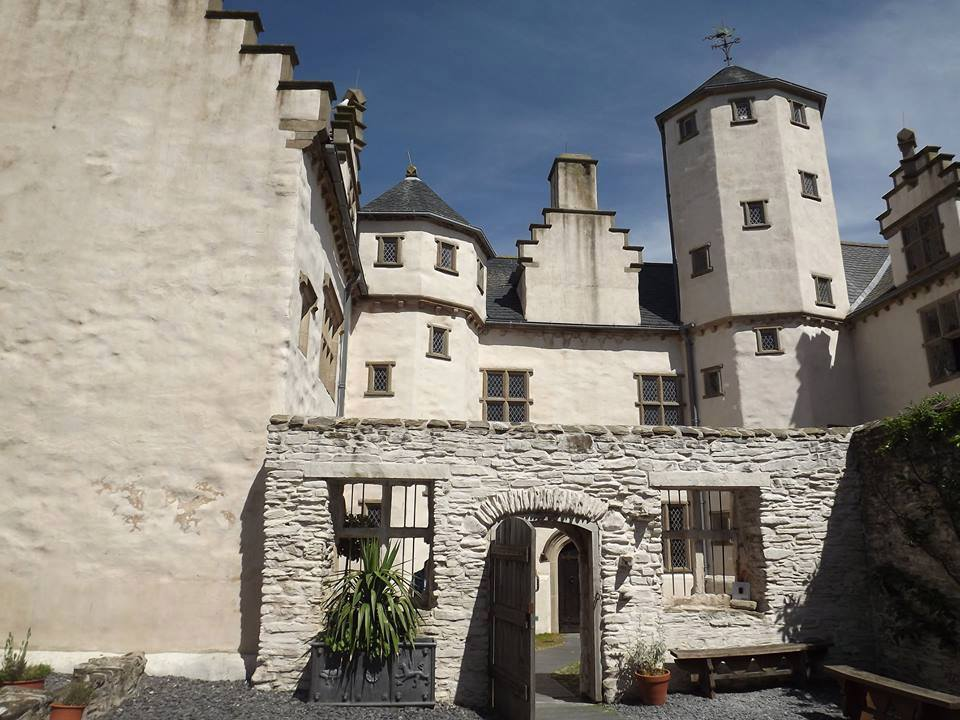
Plas Mawr

Plas Mawr is an Elizabethan house built in 1576 by the Wynn family, which has been extensively refurbished to its 16th-century appearance and is now in the care of Cadw and open to the public.

=== Albion Ale House ===
Conwy is home to the Albion Ale House, a Grade II-listed pub with Art Nouveau interiors. The ale house was restored in 2012 through a partnership of four local breweries. It won CAMRA Wales Pub of the Year in 2013 and has been recognised internationally for its character and rich history.

=== Smallest house in Great Britain ===
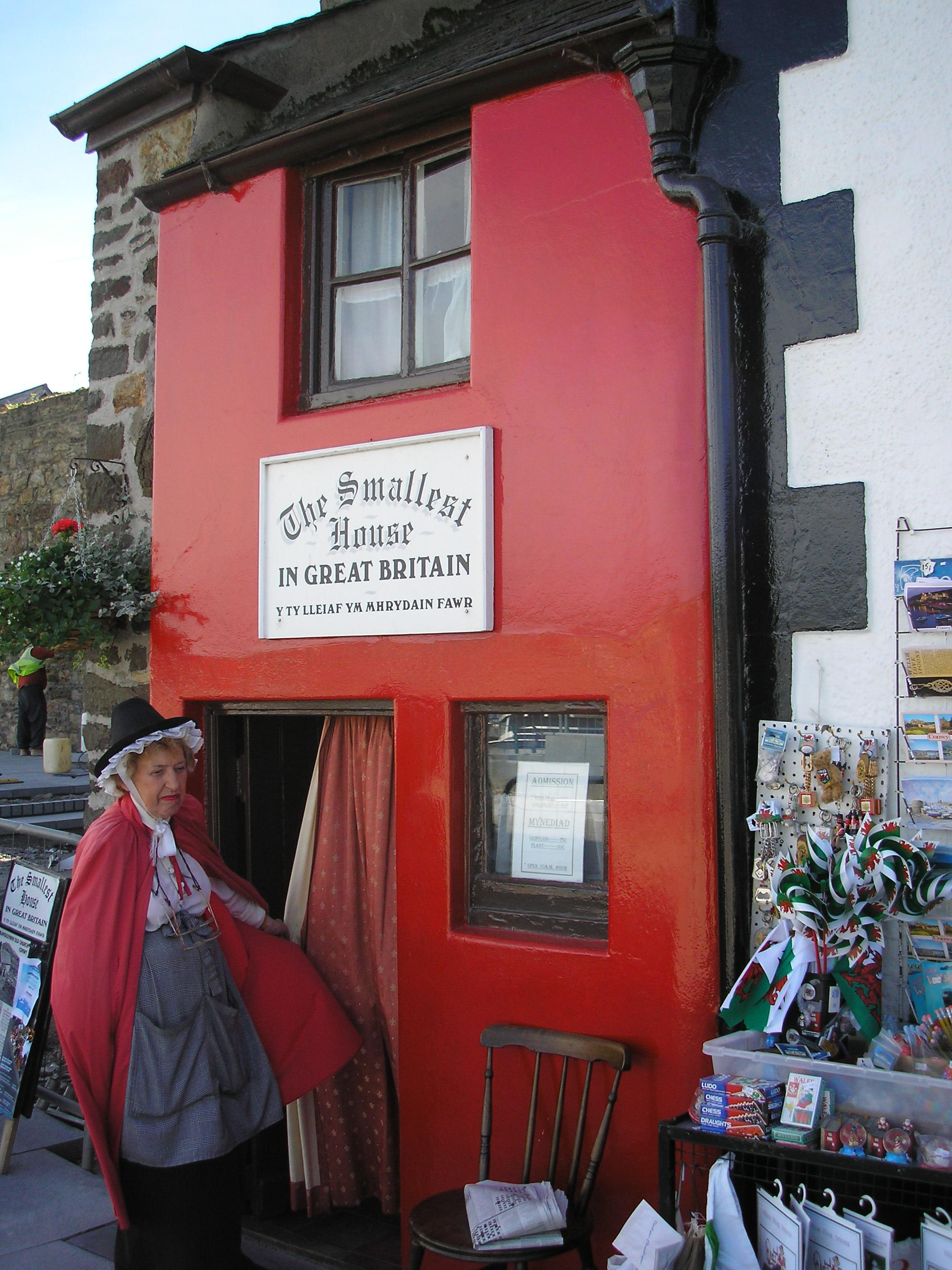
The smallest house in Britain.

The house named in the Guinness Book of Records as the Smallest House in Great Britain, with dimensions of 3.05 × 1.8 metres, can be found on the quay. It was in continuous occupation from the 16th century (and was even inhabited by a family at one point) until 1900 when the owner (a 6-foot (1.8 m) fisherman – Robert Jones) was forced to move out on the grounds of hygiene. The rooms were too small for him to stand up in fully. The house is still owned by his descendants today, and visitors can look around it for a small charge.

=== Vardre Hall ===
Vardre Hall is a 19th-century Grade II listed building directly opposite to Conwy Castle. It was erected by Conservative Buckinghamshire MP William Edward FitzMaurice in the mid 1850s. In 1869 the building was sold to solicitor William Jones. The building was used as a solicitor's office until 1972, when it was bought out and became The Towers Restaurant. After lying empty for a number of years Vardre Hall changed hands again, and in 1999 was refurbished as a shop.

=== Medieval watchtower ===
Across the estuary is Bodysgallen Hall, which incorporates a medieval tower that was possibly built as a watch tower for Conwy Castle.

=== Town jester ===
On 2 August 2015 the town appointed an official jester, Erwyd le Fol, the first for 720 years. Real name Russel Erwood, he had moved to Conwy in 2014 but had been running events in the town for five years. He was presented with a hat with donkey ears as an official uniform. In order to be faithful to Conwy's previous jester, Tom le Fol, who had been a bodyguard to Edward I, Erwood had been taking longsword training.

== Notable locations ==
Conwy Morfa, a marshy spit of land on the west side of the estuary, was probably the location where golf was first played on Welsh soil. It was also the place where Hugh Iorys Hughes developed, and later built, the floating Mulberry Harbour, used in Operation Overlord in World War II.

Conwy Hospital closed in 2003 and has since been demolished.

== Transport ==
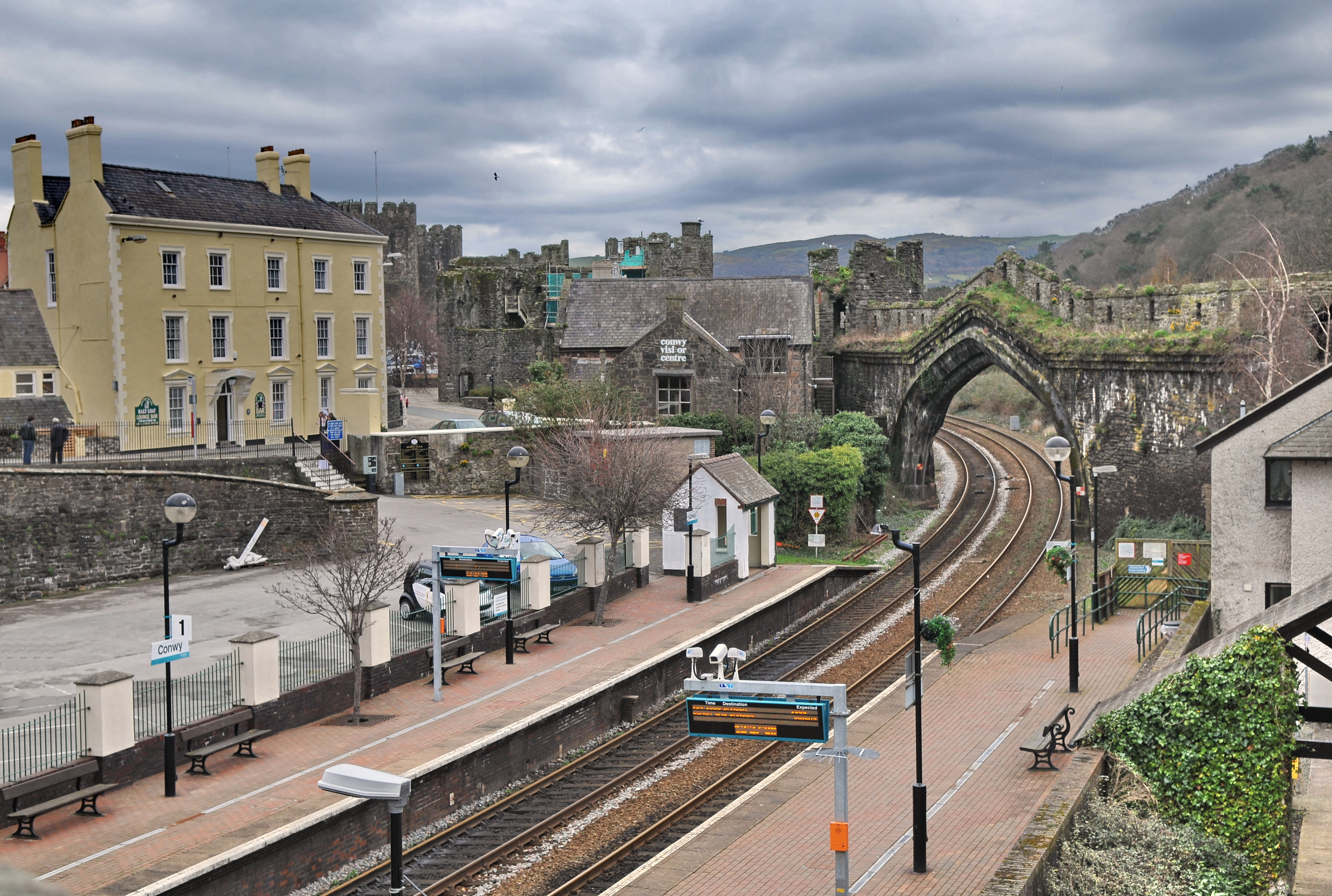
View of the station in March 2008

Conwy railway station opened in 1848. It is located on the North Wales Coast Line, between Crewe and Holyhead. There are through services westbound to Bangor and Holyhead. Eastwards, services travel to Chester, via Colwyn Bay, Rhyl, Prestatyn and Flint; after arrival at Chester, most trains go forward to either Crewe, Cardiff or Birmingham International. Services are operated by Transport for Wales.

Bus services in Conwy are operated mostly by Arriva Wales, with some by Llew Jones Coaches. Routes link the town with Bangor, Caernarfon and Llandudno.

== Lifeboat ==
The Conwy Lifeboat Station was established by the RNLI in 1966, and currently operates the D-class inshore lifeboat, the Enid and John Hislop (D–898). The current station on Lower Gate Street was built in 1985 and offers dry storage and maintenance area for the station's boat and tractor. It is located just across from the quay where she can be launched. The station also features a small gift shop.

== Sport ==
The third stage of the Tour of Britain Women's cycle race passed through Conwy in 2026.

== Governance ==
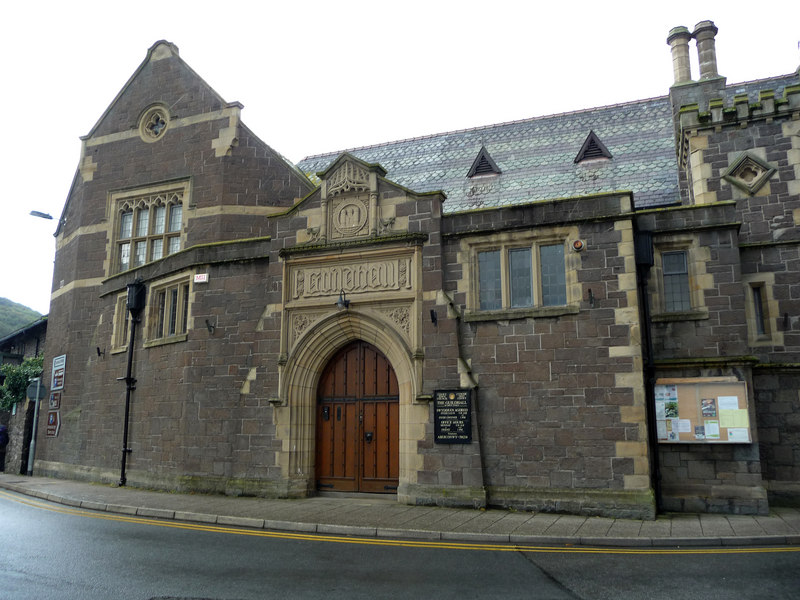
Conwy Guildhall

There are two tiers of local government covering Conwy, at community (town) and county borough level: Conwy Town Council (Cyngor Tref Conwy) and Conwy County Borough Council. The town council is based at Conwy Guildhall on Rose Hill Street.

=== Administrative history ===
Conwy was an ancient parish and an ancient borough, having been given a charter by Edward I of England in 1284. The borough covered a larger area than the parish, also including the Deganwy area in the parish of Eglwys Rhos on the east bank of the river, and parts of the parishes of Gyffin, Llangelynnin, and Dwygyfylchi west of the river.

Unlike most such boroughs, it was not reformed by the Municipal Corporations Act 1835, and so the old borough corporation continued to exist and run the town. By 1876 the borough corporation was seen as an archaic and unaccountable impediment to the proper management of the town. The town's residents organised a petition to convert the town into a municipal borough with an elected corporation to take responsibility for public health and local government. A royal charter incorporating the town as a municipal borough was issued in December 1876, and the new borough corporation took over the running of the town from March 1877. The urban parishes within the borough boundary were reorganised in 1894 to comprise Conwy and Gyffin on the west bank and Llanrhos on the east bank.

In 1972 the borough council voted to change the spelling of the town's name from "Conway" to "Conwy". The change was agreed by the Secretary of State for Wales and took effect on 1 August 1972. The municipal borough was abolished in 1974, with the area becoming part of the Aberconwy district in the new county of Gwynedd. A community called Conwy was established at the same time covering the area of the former borough. Further local government reorganisation in 1996 saw Aberconwy abolished and the town transferred to the new Conwy County Borough, named after the town but covering a much larger area.

== Gallery ==
Images showing changes over time

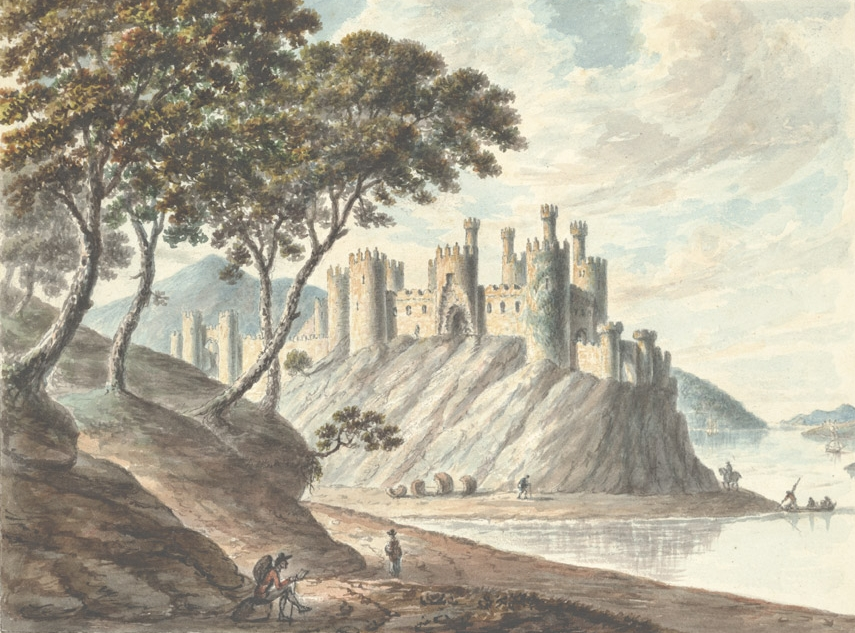
Conwy castle before the bridge was built, 1795

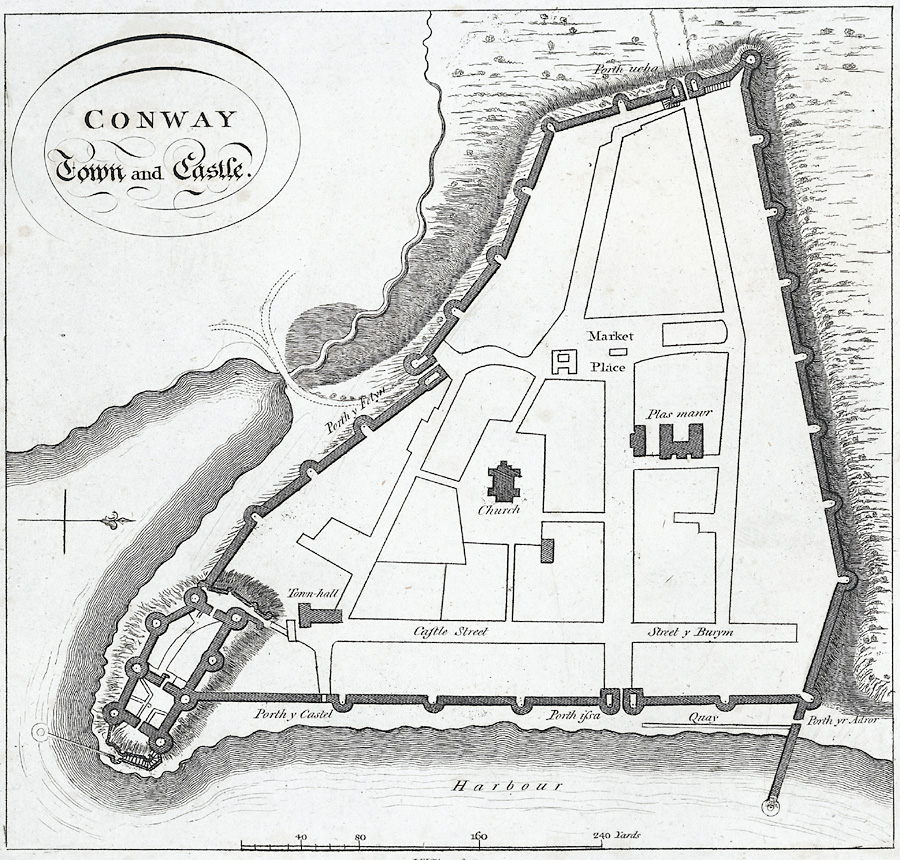
Conway Town and Castle, 1800

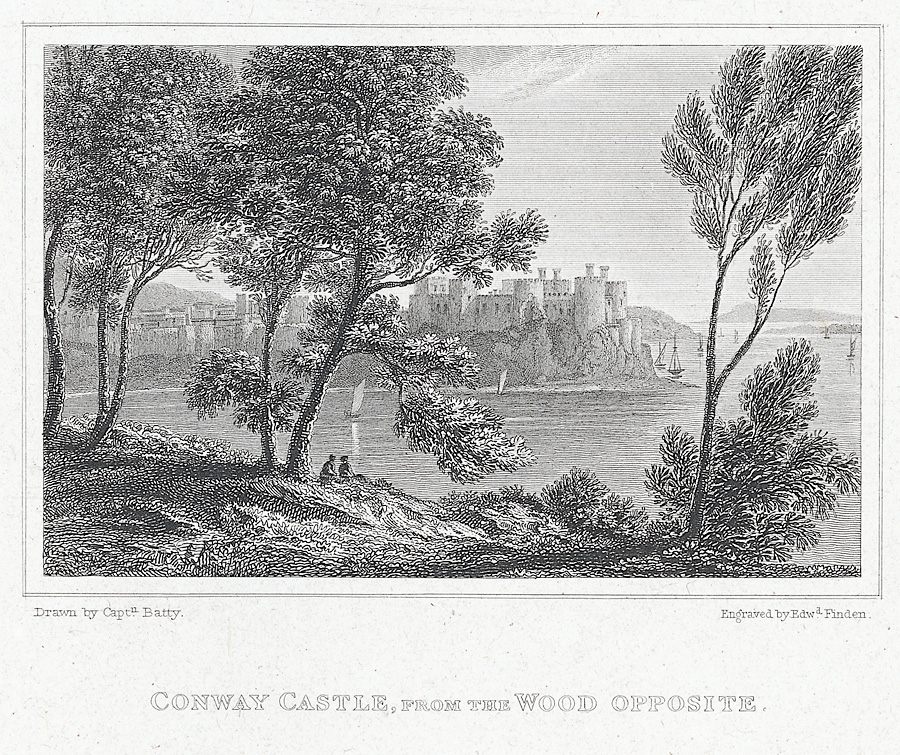
'Conway Castle: from the wood opposite', 1823

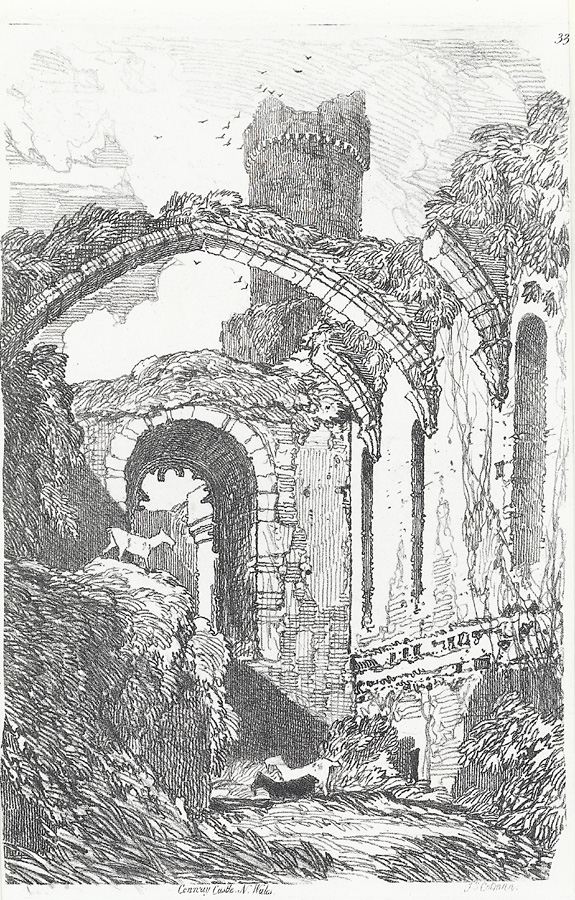
Conwy Castle, 1838

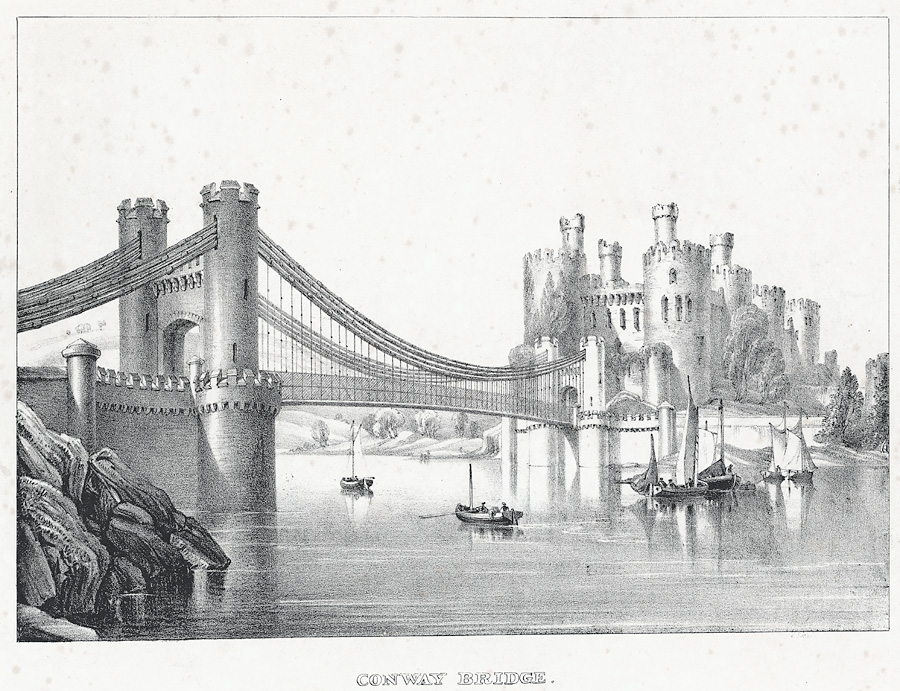
Conway Bridge and Castle c. 1840

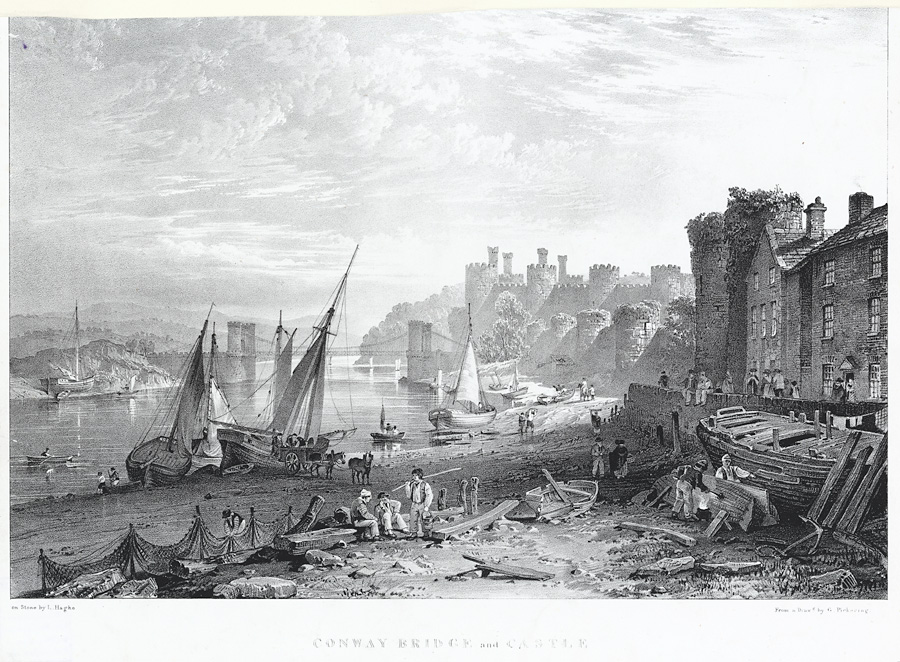
The river bank at Conwy with the castle and bridge in the background c. 1850

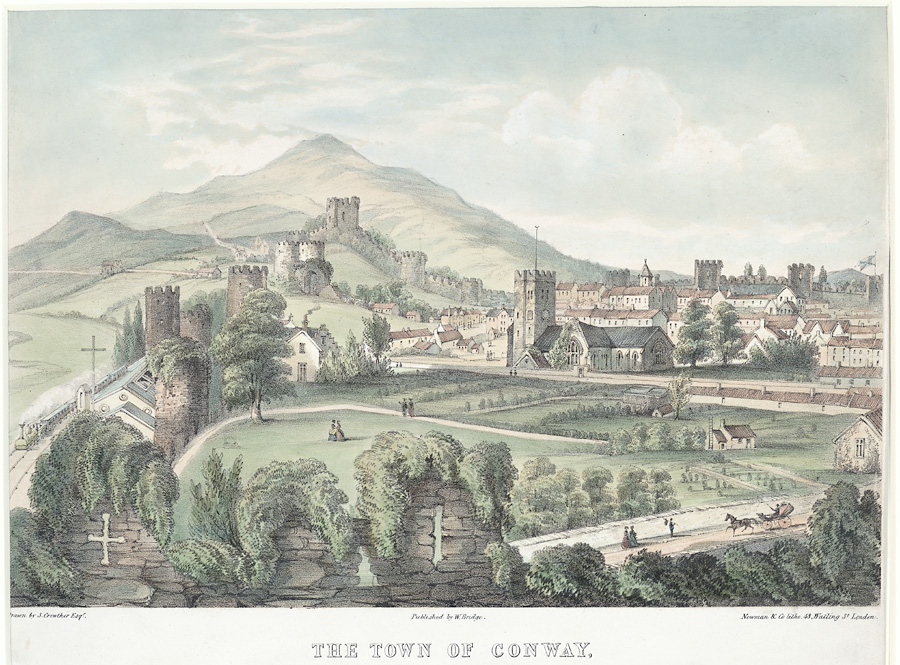
Conway c. 1850

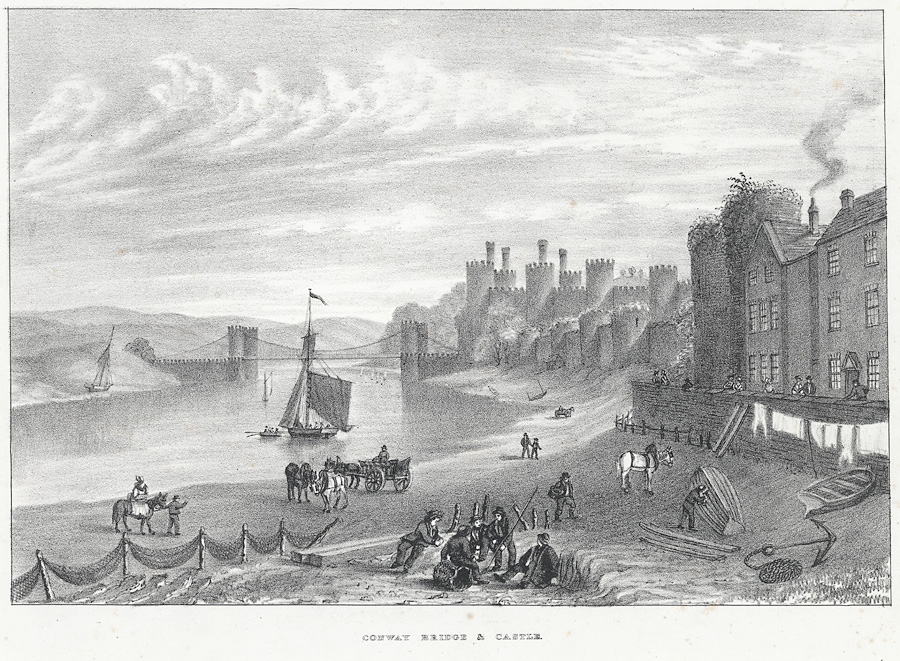
'Conway Bridge & Castle' c. 1850

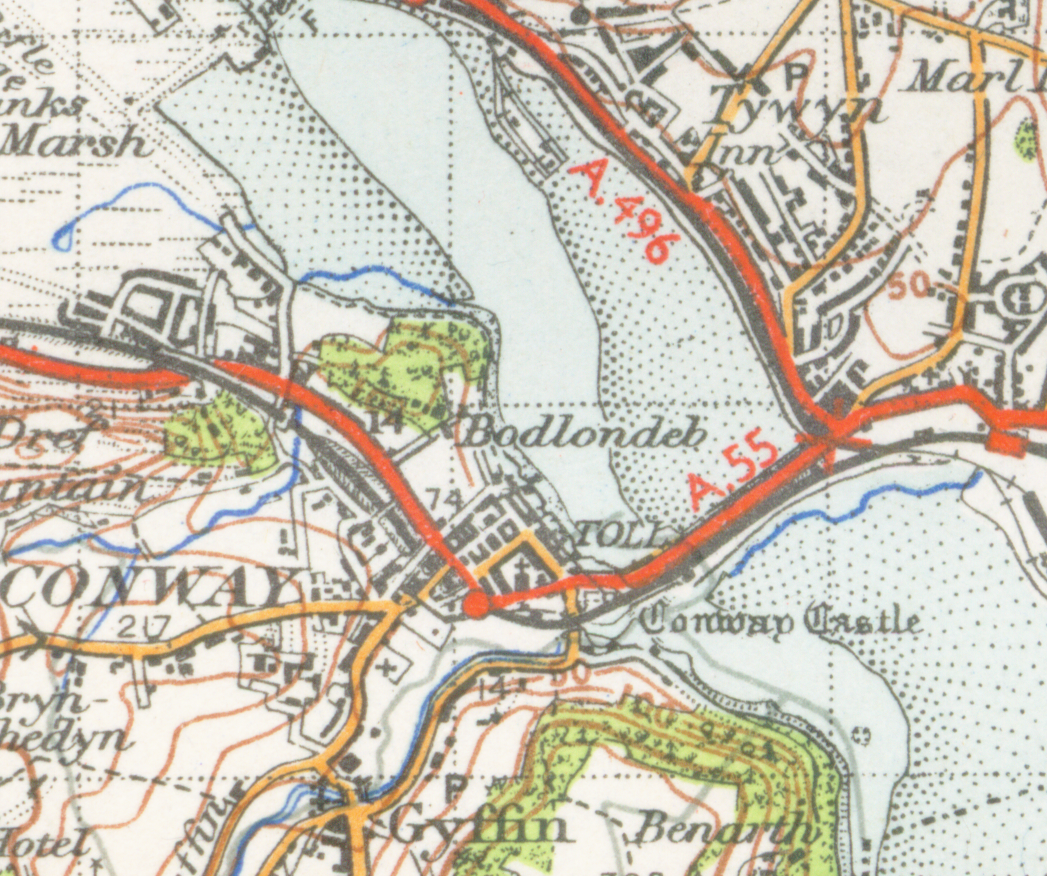
Map of Conwy from 1947

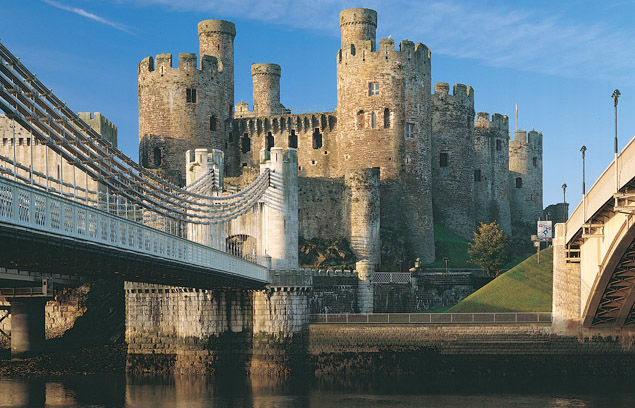
Conwy Castle - bridge view 2007

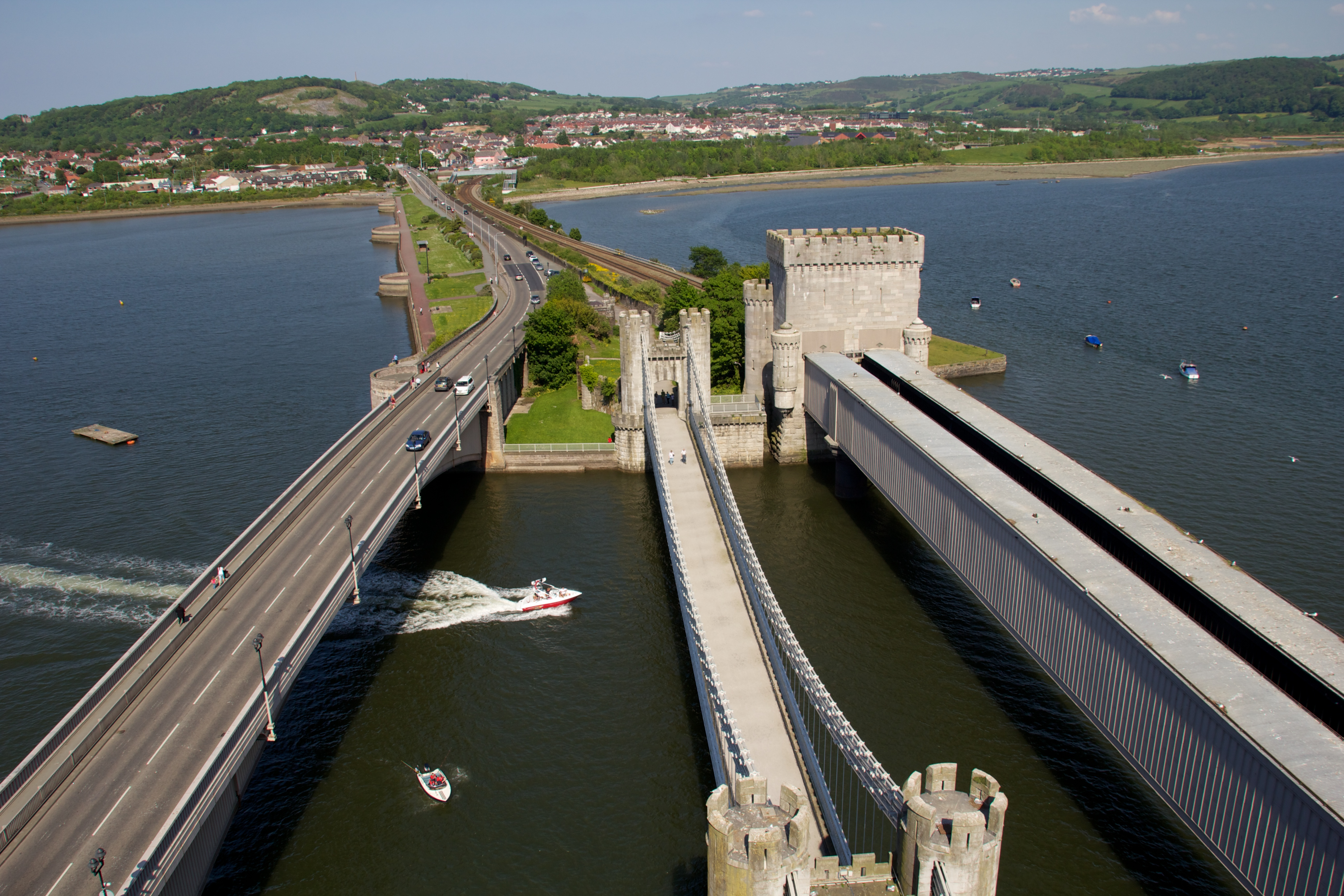
Conwy bridges in 2012

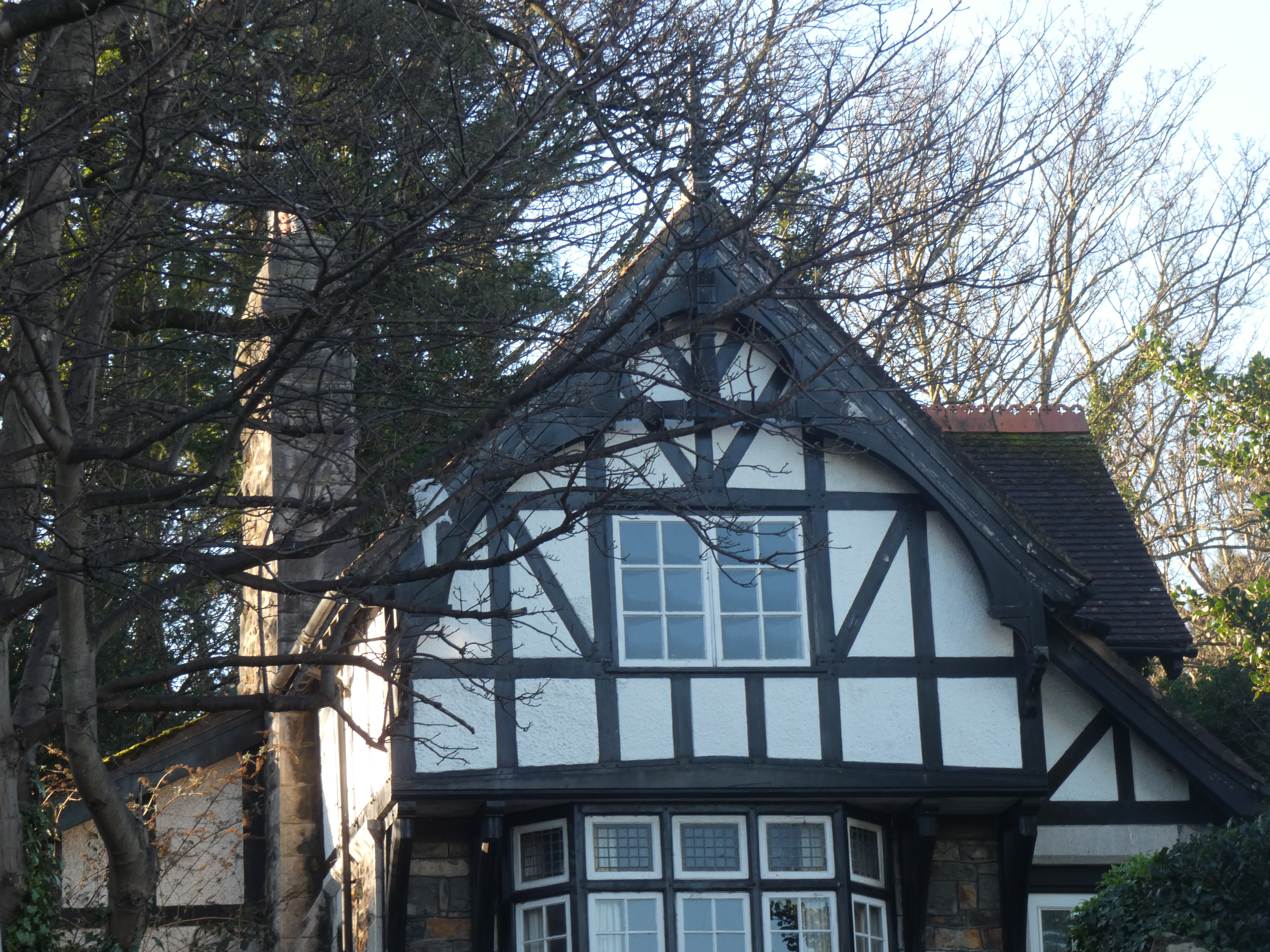
Mock Tudor in Conwy, 14 January 2022
