= Conwy Guildhall =

Municipal Building in Conwy, Wales

- Neuadd y Dref Conwy (Welsh)
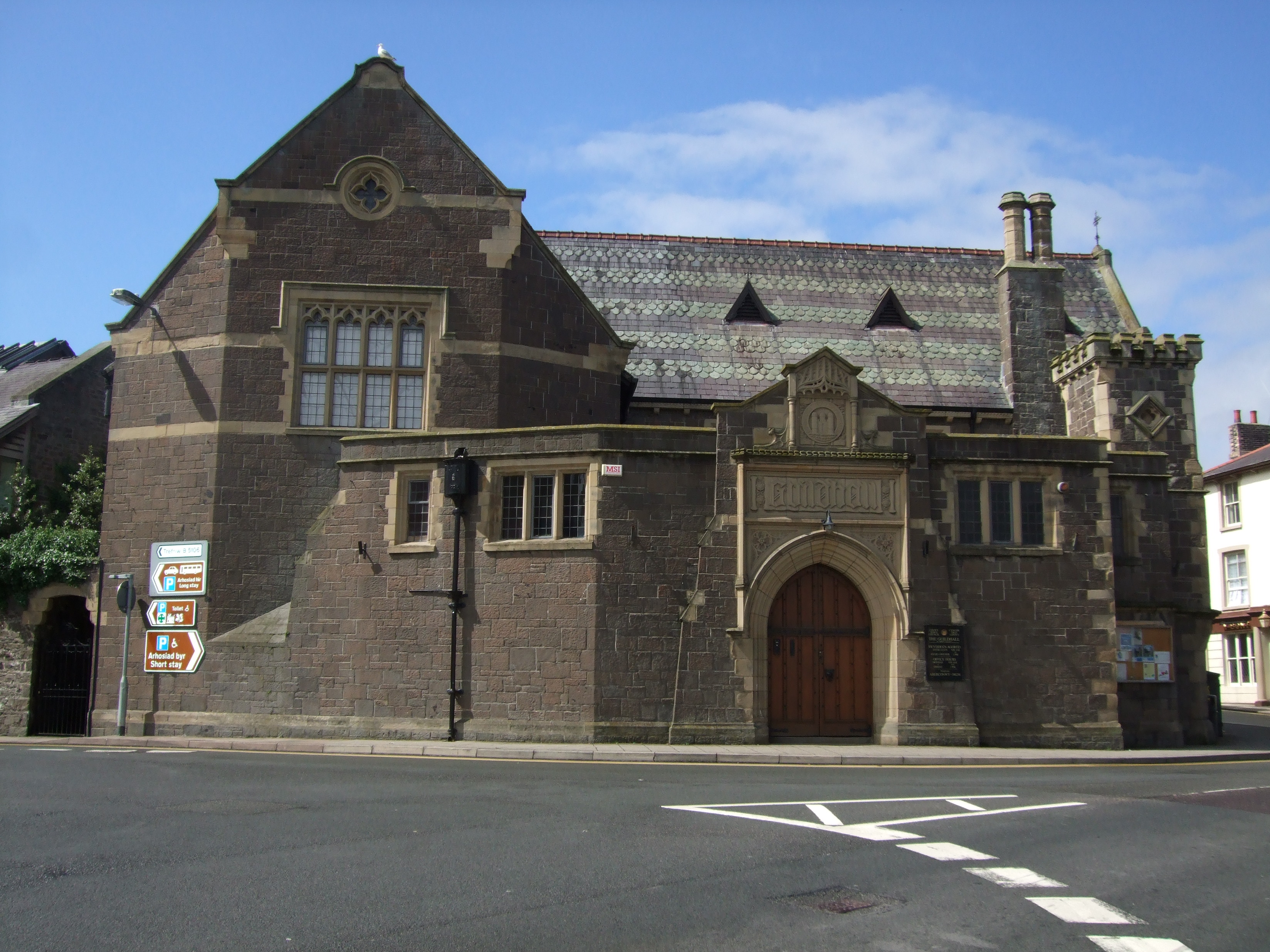
- Conwy Guildhall

- Shown in Conwy County Borough
- 53.2804°N 3.8268°W
- Location: Rose Hill Street, Conwy

History
- Built: 1863

Site notes
- Architectural style: Gothic Revival style

Listed Building – Grade II
- Official name: The Guildhall
- Designated: 8 October 1981
- Reference no.: 3251

Conwy Guildhall (Welsh: Neuadd y Dref Conwy) is a municipal structure in Rose Hill Street, Conwy, Wales. The guildhall, which is the meeting place of Conwy Town Council, is a Grade II listed building.

== History ==
The first building on the site was a medieval hall completed in the 13th century. A new structure, which was arcaded on the ground floor so markets could be held, with an assembly hall on the first floor, was completed in 1613. That structure was replaced by a national school in the early 19th century. However, the national school moved to a new building further to the west along Rose Hill Street in 1840, and borough leaders decided to demolish the old school building and to replace it with a new civic building in the mid-19th century.

The new building was designed in the Gothic Revival style, built in sandstone with Bath stone dressings and was completed in 1863. The design involved a range with a gable end facing Rose Hill Street, a square tower to the right of the gable end and a flight of steps leading up from Castle Square to a porch. Internally, the principal room was the council chamber. Until 1877 Conwy's council was an unreformed ancient borough corporation. In 1877 the town was made a municipal borough, run by an elected borough council, which based itself at the guildhall.

In the late 19th century, burgh leaders erected a public hall on the northeast side of Castle Street but this was largely used as an events venue, leaving the guildhall to continue as the main municipal building in the town. The guildhall was extended to the south east to create a new council chamber in 1925. The design involved a new range with a gable end facing Castle Street; the steps on the Castle Street elevation were removed and an elaborate porch was erected. The new porch involved an arched doorway with a hood mould and carved quatrefoils in the spandrels, a panel inscribed with the word "guildhall" in antique lettering above the doorway, and a small pediment bearing a roundel with the borough seal above that; there was also a three light mullioned window to the right of the doorway. On completion of the works, the old council chamber became the mayor's parlour.

David Lloyd George, Prime Minister from 1916 to 1922, was the Member of Parliament for the Carnarvon Boroughs constituency, which included Conwy, from 1890 until 1945. He is known to have met with borough leaders at the guildhall in the 1930s. In 1937 the borough council acquired a large house called Bodlondeb, built in 1877 on Bangor Road, and converted the house to become its main offices. From 1937 until 1974 the council held its meetings at the guildhall but had its main offices at Bodlondeb. Local government reorganisation in 1974 saw the borough council abolished and the area become part of Aberconwy District. Bodlondeb was extended to provide additional offices space for Aberconwy District Council and to incorporate a council chamber. After 1974, the guildhall became the meeting place of Conwy Town Council, a lower-tier community council. An extensive programme of refurbishment works was completed in 1996.

Works of art in the guildhall include a portrait by John Dawson Watson of the former mayor, William Hughes, a painting by Richard Wilson of Conwy Castle, and a painting by Franz Emile Herman Krause depicting the rail accident which took place at Penmaenmawr in January 1899.
