= Russel Erwood =

British jester and escapologist

Russel Erwood, known professionally as Erwyd and Erwyd le Fol, is a jester, magician and circus performer based in Conwy, North Wales. Earlier in his career, he performed as an escape artist under the professional name Roslyn Walker. In 2015 he was appointed the official resident jester of Conwy, reviving a position reported as having been vacant since 1295.

== Early career ==
Erwood is originally from Bristol.

Under the name Roslyn Walker, Erwood worked in escapology and as a stunt performer, and taught circus skills in schools. He attended circus school from the age of 14 and completed a degree in journalism.

In 2009, Erwood appeared under the name Roslyn Walker in the music video for Fanfarlo's single "The Walls Are Coming Down", performing a suspended straitjacket escape.

Erwood was a magic consultant on the second series of the Discovery Channel programme Breaking Magic.

== Jester of Conwy ==
Erwood moved to Conwy in 2014. Local businesses subsequently began referring to him as the town's jester and the Conwy Chamber of Trade approached him about formally reviving the position.

On 2 August 2015, Erwood was formally appointed Conwy's resident jester in a public ceremony and took the professional name "Erwyd le Fol". His last known predecessor was Tom le Fol, a jester connected with Edward I of England during the siege of Conwy in 1294–95.

As part of the appointment ceremony, Erwood says he was required to complete a series of performance tests, including juggling daggers while blindfolded, making coins disappear and balancing a sword on his chin. He said the final decision was made by the assembled public to formally install him in the role.

Following his appointment, his duties included street performances three times a week, appearances at civic and historical events and entertaining visitors to the town. In summer he performs at Conwy Castle.

== Work in Conwy ==
Alongside his work as a performer, Erwood has been involved in Conwy's business and events community. In 2021, Erwood and his partner opened The Jester's Tower Coffee House in one of the medieval towers in Conwy's town walls, and have also hosted an annual Christmas grotto there.

Erwood is the chairman of Conwy's Chamber of Trade.

== Circus work ==
In 2025, Erwood performed under the name Erwyd with Peregrine Circus during its summer tour of North Wales. In 2026, he returned, appearing as a fisherman in the company's production Belly of the Whale, performing comedy, juggling and magic routines involving audience participation.
