= Den-Mate =

- Birth name: Jules Hale
- Origin: Washington, D.C., U.S.
- Genres: Dream pop; darkwave; punk; electro pop
- Years active: 2013-present
- Labels: Babe City Records

Den-Mate is the alias of Washington, D.C-based recording artist Jules Hale. Hale has released two albums and an EP on the DC record label Babe City Records. Her music has been described as "vibrant dream-pop", "moody electro-pop" and "indebted to darkwave."

Hale was born in rural Virginia and has epilepsy. She was diagnosed with the illness at age 14. In an interview with i-D magazine in 2018, Hale recalled being sensitive to things that other kids weren't, like light and sound, but said that without a proper diagnosis, she had no idea why. “I always noticed that I was obsessive with media, to the point where I’d be with my friends and I’d be really obsessed with a song. I’d just be listening to it over and over again, and it was a little odd to them.”

Hale has cited the Yeah Yeah Yeahs, Björk, and Alice Glass as major influences. NPR has compared her music to Beach House and Japanese Breakfast.

Den-Mate's self-titled debut album was self-released in 2013 and was later re-released in 2016 by Babe City Records. In 2017, she released an EP titled Entropii. Comparing the EP to her debut album, NPR wrote, "Where Den-Mate was marked by variety — ranging from songs built off pulsating dance beats and aggressive guitars to minimalist reflections centered on foreboding synthesizers and Hale's expressive voice — Entropii displays a sharpening of Hale's production skills and zeroes in on the darker, denser side of Den-Mate's sound."

In September 2018, Hale released her second full-length album, Loceke. It received praise from Stereogum, who wrote that "many of Loceke’s songs emerge from past darkness in search of their end destinations, climaxes driven by Hale’s otherworldly melodies and fireworks of gleaming guitars." The Washington Post described it as "a dreamy form of self-help, with an emphasis on the self, and i-D called it "both cathartic and soothing; an important reminder that music can be therapeutic for both its creator and its consumer."

== Discography ==
Albums

- Den-Mate (2013)
- Loceke (2018)

EPs

- Entropii (2017)
- Hypnagogia (2020)
