= Sleeping States =

British musical solo project

- Also known as: Markland Starkie
- Born: 1981 (age 44–45)
- Origin: Warwickshire, England
- Genres: Songwriter
- Years active: 2004–present

Sleeping States is a British musical solo project of British musician Markland Starkie (born 1981).

Started in 2004 in London, Sleeping States falls predominantly in the songwriter genre. Sleeping States has also been associated with Lo-Fi, DIY and Queercore, having released a number of 7"s, cassette-only EPs and a CD-R album on several small DIY labels in Britain, including the Queercore label/collective Homocrime and Tome Records (now a record shop in Hackney).

2008 saw Sleeping States play Wireless Festival and tour with Noah and the Whale.

Starkie played briefly in another band, Barton Carriages 2014–2016, resulting in a short album of recordings.

After a period of low activity, Starkie revived Sleeping States in 2017 for a short UK tour to mark ten years since the release of There The Open Spaces.

== Discography ==
Albums

- In the Gardens of the North (2009) - Album on Bella Union, released August 17
- There The Open Spaces (2007) - Album on Tome, Misra Records, EtchnSketch
- Distances Are Great (2004) - CD-R Album on Kontra-Punkte

EPs

- Old vs New (2008) - 10" / Digital EP on Bella Union, Misra Records, EtchnSketch
- Sleeping States / Francois (2006) - Cassette EP on Undereducated
- Sleeping States (2005) - Cassette EP on Kontra-Punkte
- A Year In The Life (2005) - 3" CD EP on Homocrime

Singles

- Gardens of the South (2009) - Cassette single on Bella Union
- Call Me (2008) - 7" on Single Felt Tip Records
- I Wonder / Under A Capricorn Sky (2007) - 7" Single on Caspian
- Rivers / London Fields (2006) - 7" Single on Tome Records
