= Primaveras =

American band

- Origin: Los Angeles, California, United States
- Genres: Psych-pop, Synth-pop, Nu-disco, indie rock
- Years active: 2016–present
- Members: James Clifford

Primaveras is a band from Los Angeles, California. Originally named Julian Jasper and briefly known as Modern Howls, the band has been featured by Billboard, Magnetic Magazine, Consequence of Sound, PopMatters, and Paste/Daytrotter. Their songs have been licensed by the Freeform show Stitchers, the CBS show Wisdom of the Crowd, and Starbucks.

== Band History ==
Primaveras was founded in 2016 by multi-instrumentalist James Clifford as a psych-pop project while a student at the University of Southern California.

== Discography ==
- Julian Jasper EP (2017)
- Better Off - single (2018)
- Can't Undo My Love - single (2018)
- Echoes in the Well of Being LP - (2018)
