= The Paranoid Style =

American garage rock band from Washington, D.C.

- Origin: Washington, D.C., United States
- Genres: Garage rock, new wave revival, indie pop
- Years active: 2012-present
- Labels: Bar/None, Misra, Battle Worldwide
- Members: Elizabeth Nelson; Timothy Bracy; Peter Holsapple; John Longmead; William Matheny; William Corrin
- Past members: Bruce Bennett; Ken Flagg; Bud Carroll

The Paranoid Style is an American, Washington, D.C.–based garage rock band led by the husband-and-wife duo of Elizabeth Nelson and Timothy Bracy. Formed in 2012, the band is named after Richard J. Hofstadter's 1964 essay The Paranoid Style in American Politics. Their first two releases were the EPs The Power of Our Proven System and The Purposes of Music in General. Both EPs were released together in 2013 by Misra Records in a limited release. The band's first physical release was the 2015 EP Rock & Roll Just Can’t Recall, released by Battle Worldwide Recordings. Their full-length debut, Rolling Disclosure, was released on July 15, 2016, on Bar/None Records. It was preceded by the single "Giving Up Early (On Tomorrow)", which was released earlier that month. The band's 2016 video for "The Thrill is Back!" - a shot-for-shot remake of Journey's "Separate Ways (Worlds Apart)" was directed by Full Frontal With Samantha Bee producer Miles Kahn and featured comedians Jordan Klepper and Mary Houlihan. In 2017, the band released the EP Underworld U.S.A. via Bar/None and in 2018, they released a split single on Bar/None with Wussy. Bar/None also re-issued 2015's Rock and Roll Just Can't Recall in 2018 as an expanded release with three new songs. The lineup for the band's 2024 album, The Interrogator, is Nelson, Bracy, dB's guitarist Peter Holsapple, keyboardist-guitarist William Matheny, bassist Will Corrin, and drummer John Langmead.

== Critical reception ==
Robert Christgau gave the Paranoid Style's 2013 EP The Power of Our Proven System an A− grade. In his review, Christgau wrote that "this band has yet to release a dull song" and that on the EP, the band "mine[s] a pop-rock vein that braces Nelson's cleanly uncrystalline articulation against Bracy's noisier guitar and a straight four that doesn't quit." He later gave Rock and Roll Just Can't Recall an A grade, Rolling Disclosure an A− grade, Underworld U.S.A. an A− grade, and A Goddamn Impossible Way of Life an A grade.

Spin's Dan Weiss reviewed Rock and Roll Just Can't Recall favorably, describing it as "some of the smartest rip-and-roar you’ll hear". The Vinyl District's Michael Little gave the 2015 EP an A grade, saying, "I love Nelson and her band, paranoid or not. I expect great things of The Paranoid Style, because they have it all. They’re a thinking person’s rock band that never fails to set Nelson’s ingenious and humorous musings to great melodies, and then to jack up the volume to remind you that what you’re hearing is good old-fashioned explosive hard rock, in the vein of Sleater-Kinney only with better lyrics."

The following year, Spin premiered the single "Common Emergencies" (a collaboration between Nelson and Scott McCaughey from the Young Fresh Fellows). Of that track, Weiss wrote, "[it] is as good as any to introduce an unsuspecting indie-rock fan to Nelson’s confrontational melodies, referencing the novel As I Lay Dying and the Stones’ 'Beast of Burden' in between its addictive call-response refrains, along with the aforementioned 'I've Been Working on the Railroad' flip and an unfashionably ripping guitar solo."

Also for Spin, Jason Gubbels gave Rolling Disclosure an 8 out of 10 rating, and described its songs as "doomsday anthems primed for a sock hop". Gubbels also wrote that on the album, "the drummer takes off, pianos crash, and a bemused all-male Greek chorus mugs along." Marcy Donelson of AllMusic gave the album 3.5 stars out of 5, and concluded by describing it as "the type of record that will sell tickets to shows, and maybe even inspire a new Hofstadter fan or two." Jon M. Gilbertson reviewed the album favorably for the Milwaukee Journal Sentinel, and praised Nelson's "tunefully dry delivery" that he said "gives a matter-of-fact wryness to the boisterous and dense indie-pop and indie-rock songs of the glorious first TPS album."

In 2018, Robert Christgau gave the expanded re-issue of Rock and Roll Just Can't Recall an A grade, saying, "Beefed up to eight songs to mark its embrace by a venerable label of indie luminaries from They Might Be Giants to Ezra Furman, this digital-only reissue of a superb self-released 2015 EP is designed to make fresh converts as first responders download the three new ones." Christgau also gave the band's 2019 LP A Goddamn Impossible Way of Life an A, writing, "Squeezing 11 songs into half an hour, [Nelson's] voice relaxes enough to make them a pleasure. I don’t get all the jokes either—as a dual citizen, Nelson understands more about Irish history and politics than I ever will. But I do know a lot about Alan Greenspan and They Might Be Giants, whose songs establish that Nelson knows more. Every catchy number is marked by linguistic specifics, and the title tune is a rock-biz masterpiece. Subject: 11 dead at a Who concert in Cincinnati, 1979."

== Discography ==
=== EPs ===
- The Power of Our Proven System and The Purposes of Music in General (released together by Misra Records; 2013)
- Rock & Roll Just Can’t Recall (Battle Worldwide Recordings; 2015)
- Underworld U.S.A. (Bar/None; 2017)
- Rock & Roll Just Can't Recall + 3 (Bar/None; 2018)

=== Albums ===
- Rolling Disclosure (Bar/None; 2016)
- A Goddamn Impossible Way of Life (Bar/None; 2019)
- For Executive Meeting (Bar/None; 2022)
- The Interrogator (Bar/None; 2024)
- Known Associates (Bar/None; 2026)

=== Singles ===
- "New American Standard" / "Absolute Cadavers" (Split 7" with Wussy; Bar/None; 2018)
