= Adam Torres (singer) =

American singer and songwriter

- Born: Albuquerque
- Genre: Folk
- Occupations: Musician, songwriter
- Instruments: Vocals, guitar
- Years active: 2006–present
- Labels: Fat Possum Records, Misra Records
- Formerly of: Southeast Engine
- Website: adamtorres.tv

Adam Torres is a singer and songwriter. He has released two albums and is currently signed to Fat Possum Records.

== Career ==
Torres was born in Albuquerque, NM, grew up in West Chester, Ohio, and moved to Athens, Ohio in 2003 where he enrolled at Ohio University. He became part of Southeast Engine and featured on the album A Wheel Within a Wheel. In 2006 he self-released the album Nostra Nova that was produced with the help of local musicians. The material had been written in Switzerland during his stay with his parents over the summer in 2005. The album was re-released on Misra Records in April 2015. After settling in Austin, TX, he signed with Fat Possum records. Here Torres recorded his second album while he toured Europe as support to Monk Parker. In September 2016, the album Pearls to Swine was released, and Torres embarked on a headlining tour of North America in support.

Live Torres performs with Aisha Burns (violin), Dailey Tolliver (bass/piano) and Thor Harris (percussion).
