= Misra Records =

American independent record label

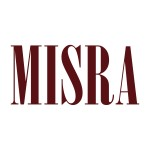
- Founded: 1999
- Founder: Michael Bracy; Timothy Bracy; Paige Conner Totaro
- Distributor: Redeye Worldwide
- Country of origin: U.S.
- Location: Pittsburgh, Pennsylvania
- Official website: www.misrarecords.com

Misra Records is an independent record label founded in 1999 and based in Pittsburgh, Pennsylvania.

== History ==
Michael Bracy, activist and co-founder of Future of Music Coalition, launched the label, along with brother Timothy Bracy, writer and front-man of The Mendoza Line, and D.C.-based attorney and artist advocate Paige Conner Totaro. Phil Waldorf sat at the helm of Misra from its founding until late 2006. Jeff Betten is the current manager of Misra.

== Artists ==
- Bablicon
- The Black Swans
- The Bruces
- Centro-Matic
- Destroyer
- Evangelicals
- Flotation Toy Warning
- Great Lake Swimmers
- Hallelujah the Hills
- Holopaw
- Will Johnson
- The Low Lows
- Marshmallow Coast
- William Matheny
- The Mendoza Line
- Mobius Band
- Modern Howls
- Motel Beds
- Palomar
- Paperhaus
- The Paranoid Style
- Phosphorescent
- Emily Rodgers
- R. Ring (Kelley Deal & Mike Montgomery)
- Shearwater
- Sleeping States (Markland Starkie)
- Slow Dazzle
- South San Gabriel
- Southeast Engine
- St. Thomas
- Summer Hymns
- Anthonie Tonnon
- Jenny Toomey
- Torres
- Adam Torres
- Volcano the Bear
- Water Liars
- Wooden Wand

== See also ==
- List of record labels
