= Southeast Engine =

American indie folk rock band

Southeast Engine is an indie-folk-rock band from Athens, Ohio. With the help of The Wrens, the band signed with Misra Records in 2007 and released their first internationally distributed album later that year. Their music has seen critical acclaim from NPR, Pitchfork. The A.V. Club, and more.

== History ==
Founding members Adam Remnant (lead vocals, guitar) and Leo DeLuca (drum kit, percussion) grew up in Dayton, Ohio and attended the same high school during the 1990s. During this time, the city's underground music scene made significant and long-standing impressions upon the two. Around 2000, the pair moved to Athens, Ohio and were equally inspired by the Appalachian old-timey and folk music of the area. As a hybridization of the Dayton musical underground and the Athens folk scene, Southeast Engine was formed in 2000. Soon after formation, Michael Lachman (keyboards) joined and the current lineup now also includes Jesse Remnant (Adam's younger brother) on bass and multi-instrumentalist William Matheny.

== Discography ==
Albums

- 2003 Love is a Murder, a Mystery of Sorts - Self-Released
- 2004 One Caught Fire - Self-Released
- 2005 Coming to Terms with Gravity - Bettawreckonize Media / Re-released by Misra Records
- 2007 A Wheel Within A Wheel - Misra Records
- 2009 From the Forest to the Sea - Misra Records
- 2011 Canary - Misra Records
- 2012 Canaanville - Misra Records
