= Slow Dazzle (band) =

Slow Dazzle was a musical duo composed of Shannon McArdle and Timothy Bracy, both also of The Mendoza Line. The group was named after the album of the same name by Welsh musician John Cale.

== Discography ==
- The View from the Floor (2005)
