= Royal Glamorgan Hospital =

- Cwm Taf Morgannwg University Health Board
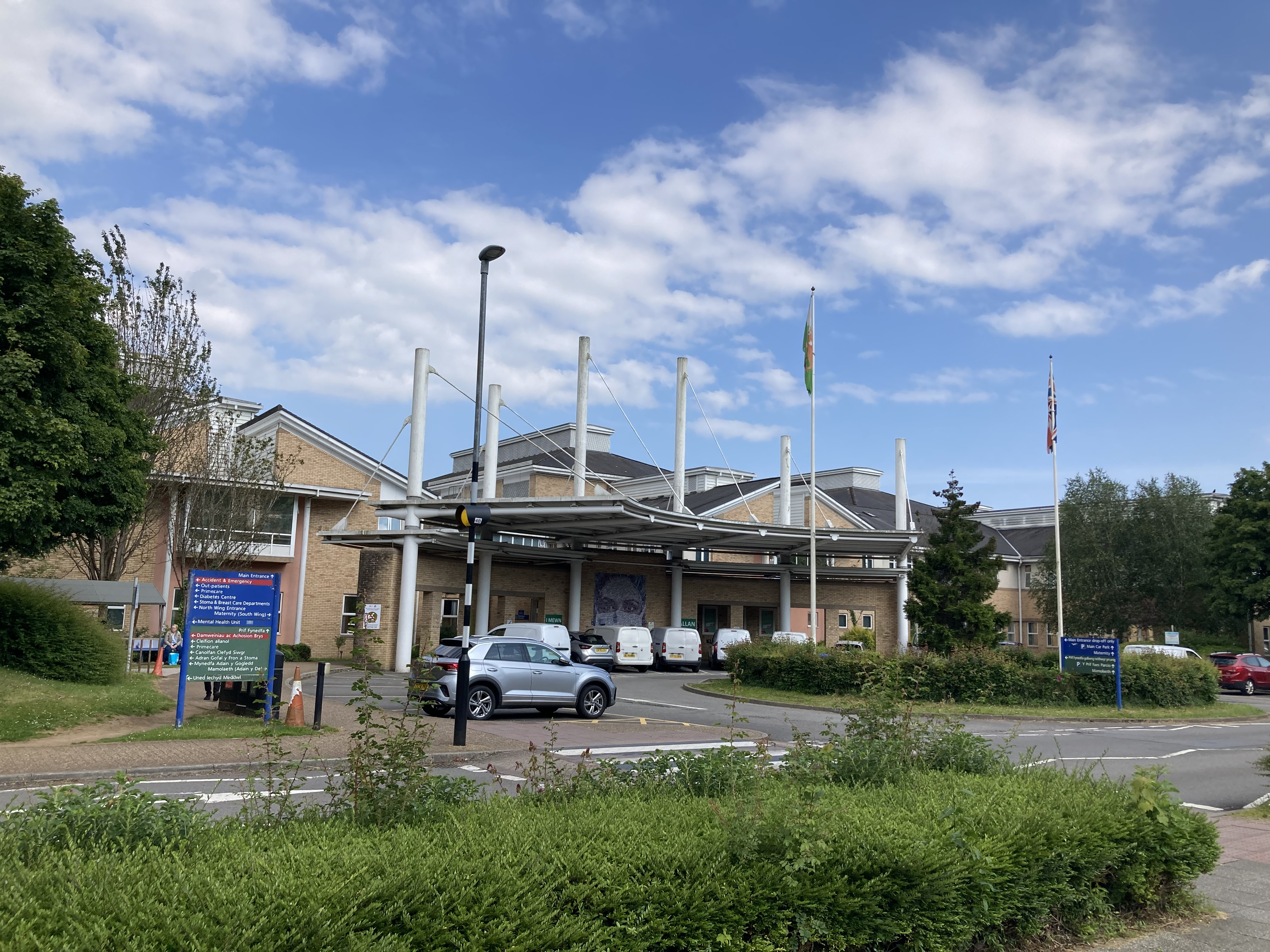
- Main Entrance in 2024

- Shown in Rhondda Cynon Taf

Geography
- Location: Ynysmaerdy, Talbot Green, Rhondda Cynon Taf, Wales, United Kingdom
- Coordinates: 51°32′49″N 3°23′30.50″W

Organisation
- Care system: NHS Wales
- Type: General
- Affiliated university: Cardiff University

Services
- Emergency department: Yes Accident & Emergency
- Beds: 570

History
- Founded: 1999

Links
- Website: cwmtaf.wales/visiting/royal-glamorgan-hospital/
- Lists: Hospitals in Wales

The Royal Glamorgan Hospital (Welsh: Ysbyty Brenhinol Morgannwg), is a District General Hospital in Ynysmaerdy, Talbot Green, Rhondda Cynon Taf, South Wales. It is managed by the Cwm Taf Morgannwg University Health Board, and is part of the NHS Wales public healthcare system.

== History ==
The hospital was commissioned to replace the aging East Glamorgan General Hospital. It was built at a cost of £103 million and was opened at Ely Meadow (Welsh: Gwaun Elai) in 1999. In 2017 the Hospital Board announced that the Special Care Baby Unit would be moved to Prince Charles Hospital in Merthyr Tydfil.

== Services ==
There is an accident and emergency facility at the hospital as well as a psychiatric intensive care unit.
