= Pontypridd Cottage Hospital =

- Cwm Taf Morgannwg University Health Board
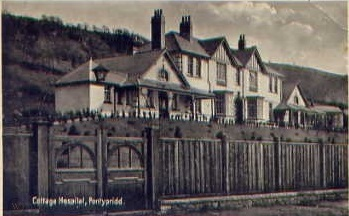
- Pontypridd Cottage Hospital

- Shown in Rhondda Cynon Taf

Geography
- Location: Hospital Road, Pontypridd, Rhondda Cynon Taf, Wales
- Coordinates: 51.6023°N 3.3259°W

Organisation
- Care system: NHS Wales
- Type: General

History
- Founded: 1911

Links
- Lists: Hospitals in Wales

Pontypridd Cottage Hospital (Welsh: Ysbyty Bwthyn Pontypridd) is a health facility on Hospital Road, in Pontypridd, Rhondda Cynon Taf, Wales. It is managed by the Cwm Taf Morgannwg University Health Board.

== History ==
The facility was financed by subscriptions from local miners and opened as Pontypridd & District Cottage Hospital in February 1911. It joined the National Health Service in 1948. In 2017, it was announced that all cancer services for the county, which had previously been provided at the hospital, would transfer to new facilities at the Royal Glamorgan Hospital. The local health board has announced plans to sell the hospital.
