= Sarah Murphy (politician) =

Welsh politician

Sarah Murphy MS
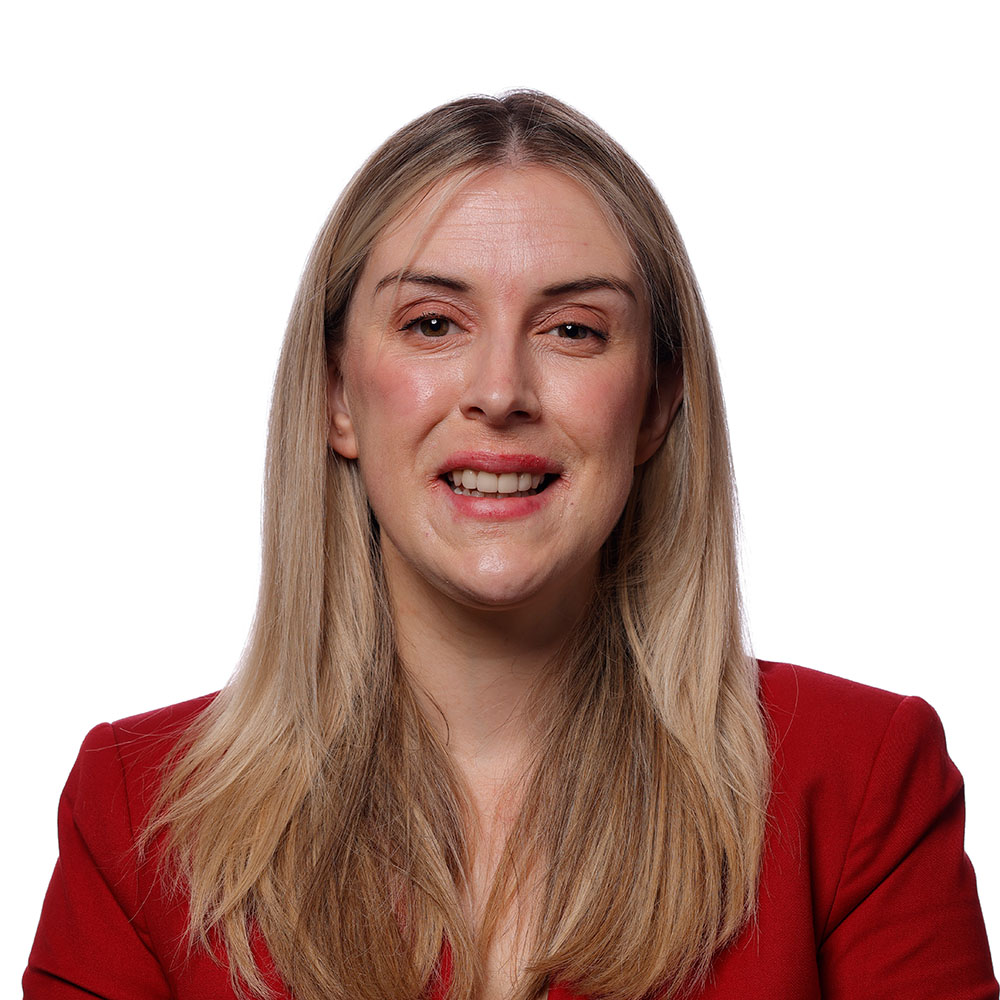
- Official portrait, 2026

Minister for Mental Health and Wellbeing (Note: As Minister for Mental Health and Early Years, from July to September 2024)
- In office 17 July 2024 – 12 May 2026
- First Minister: Vaughan Gething; Eluned Morgan
- Preceded by: Jayne Bryant

Minister for Social Partnership
- In office 17 May 2024 – 17 July 2024
- First Minister: Vaughan Gething
- Preceded by: Hannah Blythyn
- Succeeded by: Jack Sargeant

Member of the Senedd for Pen-y-bont Bro Morgannwg
- Incumbent
- Assumed office 8 May 2026

Member of the Senedd for Bridgend
- In office 7 May 2021 – 7 May 2026
- Preceded by: Carwyn Jones
- Succeeded by: Constituency Abolished
- Majority: 4,064 (13.7%)

Personal details
- Born: 20 October 1986 (age 39) East Glamorgan General Hospital, Church Village, Wales
- Party: Welsh Labour and Co-operative
- Education: Reading University; Cardiff University

Sarah Murphy (born 20 October 1986) is a Welsh Labour and Co-operative politician, serving as Member of the Senedd for Pen-y-bont Bro Morgannwg since May 2026. She previously served as the Member of the Senedd (MS) for the Bridgend constituency from May 2021 to 2026. She also previously served as Minister for Mental Health and Wellbeing from July 2024 to May 2026.

== Early life and education ==
Sarah Murphy was born in East Glamorgan General Hospital in Church Village in 1986, and grew up near Pontypridd with her family. She attended Cardinal Newman R.C. Secondary School and Coleg Morgannwg, before studying English Literature at Reading University from 2005 to 2008. In 2016, she graduated from the School of Journalism, Media & Communication at Cardiff University with an MA (Distinction) in Digital Media & Society. She was awarded a scholarship from Cardiff University and a grant from the Leathersellers’ Company Charitable Fund to carry out her studies.

== Professional career and trusteeships ==
After graduating Murphy worked as the Head of Events for Welsh Labour between 2009 and 2012, and then worked in London for a global property development company. In 2017, as the Research Analyst for Lee Waters AM, Murphy developed and implemented the first open-source, online crowdsourcing platform for a Welsh Assembly Member. Following the 2017 general election, she was appointed as the Senior Communications Manager to Anna McMorrin MP, and the then Senior Advisor to the Shadow Secretary of State for Wales.

Prior to being elected, Murphy was a Trustee for Brynawel Rehab based in Llanharan, the leading residential centre for the treatment of alcohol and drug dependencies in Wales. She was also the Chair of Sustainable Wales, a charity based in Porthcawl that supports community-based sustainable development. In 2020, she produced the webinar series "Circular Economy: A Design for Life" attended by leading experts from across Wales and the UK.

== Digital Rights & Transformation ==
From 2019, Murphy focused on social welfare and big data research, primarily for the Data Justice Lab at Cardiff University. She researched UK and international government's use of big data and algorithmic design for public services – with a focus on identifying potential data harms and discrimination against children and families.

Her most recent research contributed towards the findings and recommendations in the white paper: “The Datafied Workplace and Trade Unions in the UK” published by Cardiff University, Data Justice Lab and the European Research Council.

She has written for the Welsh political blog Hiraeth about digital poverty and equal access to the internet.

== Parliamentary career ==
On 7 May 2021, Murphy was elected as Member of Senedd for Bridgend.

Through her committee work, Murphy has worked on inquiries into Debt and the Pandemic, HGV Driver Shortages, Bovine TB, and Minding the Future: the childcare barriers facing working parents. Murphy was also the Welsh Labour representative for the British-Irish Parliamentary Assembly.

Murphy was elected for the new Pen-y-bont Bro Morgannwg constituency in the 2026 Senedd election.

=== Mental health awareness ===
In May 2022, Murphy made a speech in the Senedd Chamber about her own experience with an eating disorder aged 14, during which, Murphy called for improved mental health services for young people and the establishment of an Eating Disorder Unit in Wales.

Murphy was invited to work with eating disorder charity, Beat to re-establish and Chair the Cross Party Group on Eating Disorders that was previously chaired by Bethan Sayed. Currently, the Cross Party Group has the support of members from the Welsh Conservatives, Welsh Labour and Plaid Cymru.

In September 2022, Murphy spoke on a panel at the Give Back Yoga Symposium, on the work of holistic medicine to treat eating disorders. Murphy spoke alongside Professor Susan Broderick of Georgetown, Dr. John Kelly of Harvard and James Marzolf PhD, Senior Director at the Whole Health Institute.

Murphy and Huw Irranca-Davies have worked with Bridgend County-wide mental health and wellbeing charities, organisations and groups to co-produce the Bridgend Mental Health Pathway directory website to direct people to support groups and services across the community.

=== Data justice and digital rights ===
Murphy has used her background in social welfare and big data research to draw attention to data justice policy areas within the Senedd Chamber. She has raised questions about the proliferation of biometric data collection within schools, workplace surveillance and workers’ rights online safety and AI.

In 2022, Sarah led on establishing the Senedd Cross Party Group on Digital Rights and Democracy with the aim of creating an open cross party forum to discuss the opportunities and challenges with leading experts and campaigners. The group has previously investigated the introduction of Open Source Software within the Welsh Government and the impact of Police Face Recognition Cameras. She is currently elected Chair of the group. The secretariat was the Open Rights Group. It was closed when Murphy became a Government Minister.

Murphy was interviewed by Labourlist regarding digital rights in the workplace in the aftermath of the Covid-19 outbreak, in which, Murphy said "Digital rights are so crucial – and more and more so – and I would like to see them being seen in that way and prioritised more. That’s what I’m trying to do."

=== Social justice and equality ===
Murphy led the 2022 Chwarae Teg LeadHerShip programme which offered women aged between 16 and 22 the opportunity to shadow politicians in the Welsh Senedd. The LeadHerShip programme aims to ensure that women become better represented in such decision-making roles, and provide women with a platform so that their voices are heard and are inspired to see themselves as future leaders.

=== Local campaigns ===
In December 2021, Murphy hosted the "Porthcawl Regen Dragon's Den" event at the Hi Tide Inn, Porthcawl for the community to share ideas for the upcoming Salt Lake Regeneration. A panel of judges, including special guest judge DJ Lee Jukes, gave feedback, and rated the ideas, from local businesses, organisations and societies in a positive and creative way. Murphy was quoted as saying "As your representative in the Senedd, I care so much about hearing your ideas for how this should be done – and the regeneration at Salt Lake should be guided by the community."

Murphy documented her walk from Cornelly village to Cynffig Comprehensive Secondary School in Pyle experience, and raised awareness of, the length of time it takes for children to walk to school in all weather conditions following a number of public meetings with the local community Murphy has also raised this issue within the Senedd and written to Government Ministers to call for a review into learner travel standards.

Murphy is also one of a number of politicians who condemned Zimmer Biomet for potentially closing their Bridgend-based factory and would go on to call for proper consultation to protect jobs.

== Ministerial career ==
Following the sacking of her predecessor, Murphy was appointed as Minister for Social Partnership by First Minister Vaughan Gething on 17 May 2024.

Murphy was then appointed Minister for Mental Health and Early Years following a cabinet reshuffle following other cabinet resignations and Gething's announcement of resignation. She retained the role, renamed as Minister for Mental Health and Wellbeing, under Gething's successor as First Minister, Eluned Morgan, in September 2024.

Since becoming Minister for Mental Health and Wellbeing, Sarah Murphy has launched the Welsh Government’s new 10-year Mental Health and Wellbeing Strategy centred on early intervention and prevention. It sets the ambition for Wales to be the first nation to achieve same-day mental health support, based on a stepped approach. Murphy also launched the Welsh Government Suicide Prevention and Self-Harm Strategy to tackle the root causes of suicidal thoughts and to enhance support for individuals experiencing self-harm. The Welsh Government is investing over £2 million in the National Centre for Suicide Prevention and Self-Harm at Swansea University. On World Suicide Day 2024, Murphy launched a new specialist National Advisory and Liaison Service with the Jac Lewis Foundation commissioned to run the service.

As Minister for Mental Health and Wellbeing, Murphy secured funding for waiting times for neurodivergent assessments for children and young.

As Minister with responsibility for health innovation, technology and digital transformation Murphy has also overseen the rollout of the NHS app re-launch in Wales, as well as the new NHS Wales maternity app. The electronic maternity health record, introduced alongside the app, ensures that clinicians have access to real time insights and information required on pregnancy to enhance safety for mums and babies.

=== Women’s Health ===
Sarah Murphy was given responsibility for Women’s Health as part of the portfolio. In December 2024, the first Women’s Health Plan for Wales was launched setting out a 10-year vision to improve healthcare services for women. Created by the National Strategic Clinical Network for Women’s Health, part of the NHS Wales Executive it includes 60 actions across eight priority areas to improve healthcare for women throughout their lifetime, based on feedback from around 4,000 women across Wales.

The Women's Health Research Wales centre for excellence was opened in 2025 with an initial £750,000 Welsh Government funding available for other dedicated women’s health research projects. A further £3 million investment has since been secured from Health and Care Research Wales.

Part of the new Women’s Health plan has also seen Health Education and Improvement Wales roll out a new training programme in Wales to help GPs to recognise the symptoms of endometriosis earlier. The Endometriosis in Primary Care programme has led to a 43% improvement in knowledge of the condition among the GPs who have taken part so far.

=== Digital and AI Ethics in Health and Social Care ===
In 2025, Murphy outlined ambitious plans to establish Wales as a trailblazer in the safe and ethical use of artificial intelligence. At the Digging Deeper Conference, the first conference of its kind in Wales, it brought together the public sector with industry leaders, practitioners, and experts in the field, in a bid to ensure the sector explored the safe, ethical, and responsible use of AI in health and social care whilst transforming public services and helping to drive economic growth.

=== Wales to become a Marmot Nation ===
At the Canada-UK Council’s 'Fairer society, healthier lives' report launch in Cardiff the Minister for Mental Health and Wellbeing Sarah Murphy, highlighted Wales’ commitment to become a Marmot nation alongside Professor Sir Michael Marmot. This involves adopting public health expert Sir Michael Marmot’s eight principles, which aim to eliminate unfair and avoidable differences in health which can be caused by where people live, what kind of job they do and how they are treated in society. Murphy said, “Becoming a Marmot nation is about acknowledging that health inequalities are mostly shaped by the social determinants of health – the conditions in which people are born, grow, live, work and age. In Torfaen, we can see positive change at community level due to organisations working together innovatively. By adopting these eight Marmot principles nationally, we will be taking action across government to support better health and wellbeing for all.”

== Personal life ==
Murphy lives in Bridgend.

Murphy is currently a member of 5 trade unions, Unite the Union, Unison, GMB, CWU and USDAW. In 2023, Murphy took part in a Hiraeth live event titled 'Trade Unions and Welsh Society' alongside General Secretary of the Wales TUC, Shavanah Taj and General Secretary of the RMT, Mick Lynch.

Murphy is also the Vice President of the Porthcawl Male Voice Choir. and a member of the Bridgend Rotary Club.
