= Llwynypia Hospital =

- Cwm Taf Morgannwg University Health Board
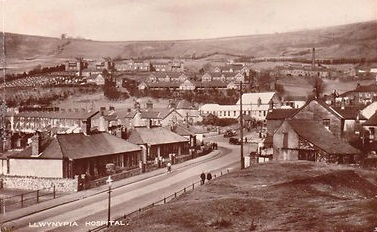
- Llwynypia Hospital (on the hillside on the left)

- Shown in Rhondda Cynon Taf

Geography
- Location: Llwynypia, Rhondda Cynon Taf, Wales
- Coordinates: 51.6354°N 3.4477°W

Organisation
- Care system: NHS Wales
- Type: General

History
- Founded: 1903
- Closed: 2010

Links
- Lists: Hospitals in Wales

Llwynypia Hospital (Welsh: Ysbyty Llwynypia) was a health facility in Llwynypia, Rhondda Cynon Taf, Wales. It was managed by the Cwm Taf Morgannwg University Health Board.

== History ==
The facility has its origins an old subsidiary workhouse which was completed in 1903. An infirmary was added in 1909 and it had become a general hospital by 1927 before joining the National Health Service as Llwynypia Hospital in 1948. As the only village with maternity facilities in the Rhondda, most residents from the area over the last century have Llwynypia as their place of birth on their birth certificates. After services transferred to the new Ysbyty Cwm Rhondda, Llwynypia Hospital closed in January 2010.
