= St Tydfil's Hospital =

- Cwm Taf Morgannwg University Health Board
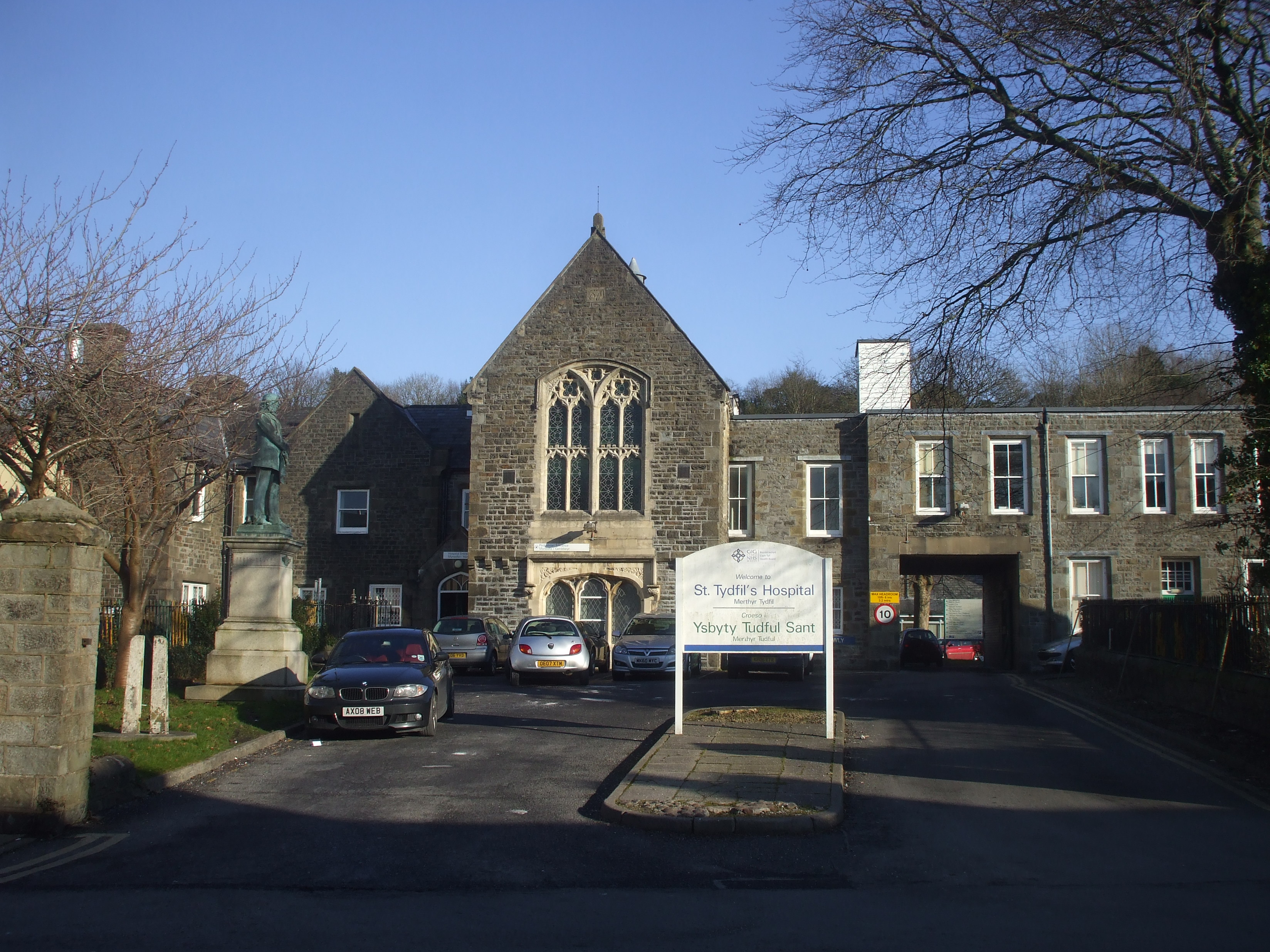
- Entrance block at St Tydfil's Hospital

- Shown in Merthyr Tydfil

Geography
- Location: Merthyr Tydfil, Wales, United Kingdom
- Coordinates: 51.74823°N 3.37606°W

Organisation
- Care system: NHS Wales
- Type: Specialist

Services
- Speciality: Rehabilitation

History
- Founded: 1853
- Closed: 2012

Links
- Lists: Hospitals in Wales

Saint Tydfil's Hospital (Welsh: Ysbyty Santes Tudful) was a rehabilitation hospital in Merthyr Tydfil, Wales. It was managed by the Cwm Taf Morgannwg University Health Board. The entrance block, which is still standing, is a Grade II listed building.

== History ==
The hospital has its origins in the Merthyr Tydfil Union Workhouse and Infirmary which opened in September 1853. An entrance block was completed in 1870 and a new hospital was opened to the north of the workhouse in 1899. It became the Tydfil Public Assistance Institution in 1930 and, after joining the National Health Service in 1948, it received a visit from the Queen Mother in 1987. After patients had transferred to Ysbyty Cwm Cynon, it closed in 2012 and most of the workhouse buildings were demolished in 2015.
