= Ysbyty Cwm Cynon =

Ysbyty Cwm Cynon / Cynon Valley Hospital
- Cwm Taf Morgannwg University Health Board
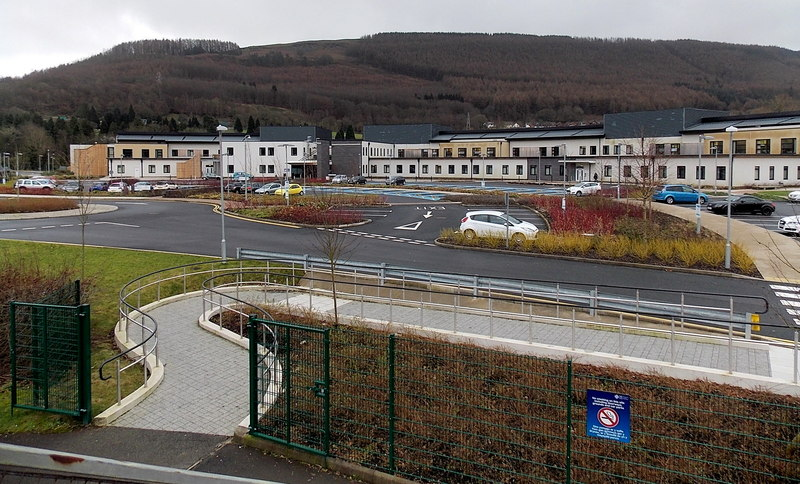
- Ysbyty Cwm Cynon

- Shown in Rhondda Cynon Taf

Geography
- Location: New Road, Mountain Ash, Rhondda Cynon Taf, Wales
- Coordinates: 51.6873°N 3.3928°W

Organisation
- Care system: NHS Wales
- Type: General

History
- Founded: 2012

Links
- Lists: Hospitals in Wales

Ysbyty Cwm Cynon (English: Cynon Valley Hospital) is a health facility on New Road, Mountain Ash, Rhondda Cynon Taf, Wales. It is managed by the Cwm Taf Morgannwg University Health Board.

== History ==
The facility was commissioned to replace Aberdare General Hospital, Mountain Ash General Hospital and St Tydfil's Hospital. It was designed by HLM and built by Vinci Construction at a cost of £70 million and opened in April 2012. Lesley Griffiths, the Minister for Health and Social Services, opened the dental unit at the hospital in October 2012.
