= Minister for Mental Health and Wellbeing =

Welsh Government minister

Minister for Mental Health and Wellbeing of Wales
- Y Gweinidog Iechyd Meddwl a Llesiant (Welsh)
- Welsh Government
- Style: Welsh Minister
- Status: Minister
- Abbreviation: Minister
- Member of: Senedd
- Reports to: the Senedd, the First Minister of Wales and the Cabinet Secretary for Health and Social Care
- Seat: Cardiff
- Nominator: First Minister of Wales
- Appointer: The Crown
- Term length: Five years; Subject to elections to the Senedd which take place every five years
- First holder: Eluned Morgan AM
- Website: gov.wales/jayne-bryant-ms

The Minister for Mental Health and Wellbeing (Welsh: Y Gweinidog Iechyd Meddwl a Llesiant) was a minister of the Welsh Government, accountable to the cabinet secretary for health and social care. Established as a cabinet position in 2020 during the COVID-19 pandemic in Wales, it was moved to a junior position in 2021. The most recent officeholder was Sarah Murphy since July 2024. The role was made part of the Deputy Minister for Social Care, Mental Health and Women's Health in 2026.

== Ministers ==
Name	Picture	Entered office	Left office	Other offices held	Political party	Government	Notes
Minister for Mental Health, Wellbeing and the Welsh Language
Eluned Morgan		8 October 2020 (during COVID)	13 May 2021	Accountable to Minister for Health and Social Services	Labour	First Drakeford government	
Deputy Minister for Mental Health and Wellbeing
Lynne Neagle		13 May 2021	20 March 2024		Labour	Second Drakeford government	
Minister for Mental Health and Early Years
Jayne Bryant		21 March 2024	17 July 2024		Labour	Gething government	
Sarah Murphy		17 July 2024	11 September 2024		Labour	Gething government Eluned Morgan government	
Minister for Mental Health and Wellbeing
Sarah Murphy		11 September 2024	May 2026		Labour	Eluned Morgan government	

== Responsibilities ==
When the post was created as a cabinet post in 2020 as a result of the COVID-19 pandemic in Wales, its responsibilities were stated to include at the time to be; mental health services, patient experience, substance misuse, dementia, veterans' health, and the obesity strategy of Wales.

Since becoming a junior post in 2021, the responsibilities of the post are:

- Some public health responsibilities, specifically;
  - The response to the COVID-19 pandemic in Wales, screening and vaccination.
  - Services for Health improvement and wellbeing
- Delivery and performance of NHS Wales
- Escalation procedures
- Responsibility in managing reports from Healthcare Inspectorate Wales, such as keeping a receipt of, responding to, and managing the direction of their reports.
- Overseeing the Welsh Government's relationship with Audit Wales in matters relating to the NHS.
- The training and development of the medical workforce, excluding the higher education years 1-5 of Doctors
- Health and social care research and development
- Digital health and health innovation
- Mental health services
- Suicide prevention
- Dementia
- Autism
- Gambling problem-related health impacts
- Substance misuse
- Health of the armed forces and veterans
- Strategy for Obesity
- Food Standards Agency in Wales, including food safety
- Genetically modified food (but not genetically modified crops)
- Experience of patients, their involvement, and the citizens' voices
- Safeguarding
- Services for Adoption and Foster care
- Advocacy services for children and young people's, such as managing complains, representations, as well as advocacy, under the Social Services and Well-being (Wales) Act 2014
- Sharing information under the Children Act 2004
- Cafcass Cymru
- Overseeing and deciding policy regarding social service provision of activities by the local authorities in Wales, including issuing statutory guidance
- Overseeing Social Care Wales
- Regulating domiciliary, residential, adult placements, foster care, under 8's care provision and private healthcare
- Inspecting and reporting the provision of social services by the local authorities in Wales, through the Care Inspectorate Wales, including jointly reviewing social services and responding to any reports
- The rights and entitlements of children and young people, including utilising the UN Convention on the Rights of the Child
- Early years, childcare and play, including the "childcare offer" and its workforce
- Early childhood education and care
- Flying Start for children aged 0–3 years
- Policies for Families First and play

The post-holder launched the "National Framework for Social Prescribing" in December 2023, aiming for the consistent delivery of social prescribing. The post-holder also announced in 2023, funding arrangements for Trading Standards Wales, concerning illegal electronic cigarettes, and online therapy services overseen by Powys Teaching Health Board in 2022.

== See also ==
- Ministry
