= Jayne Bryant =

Welsh Labour politician and Member of the Senedd for Newport West

Jayne Bryant MS
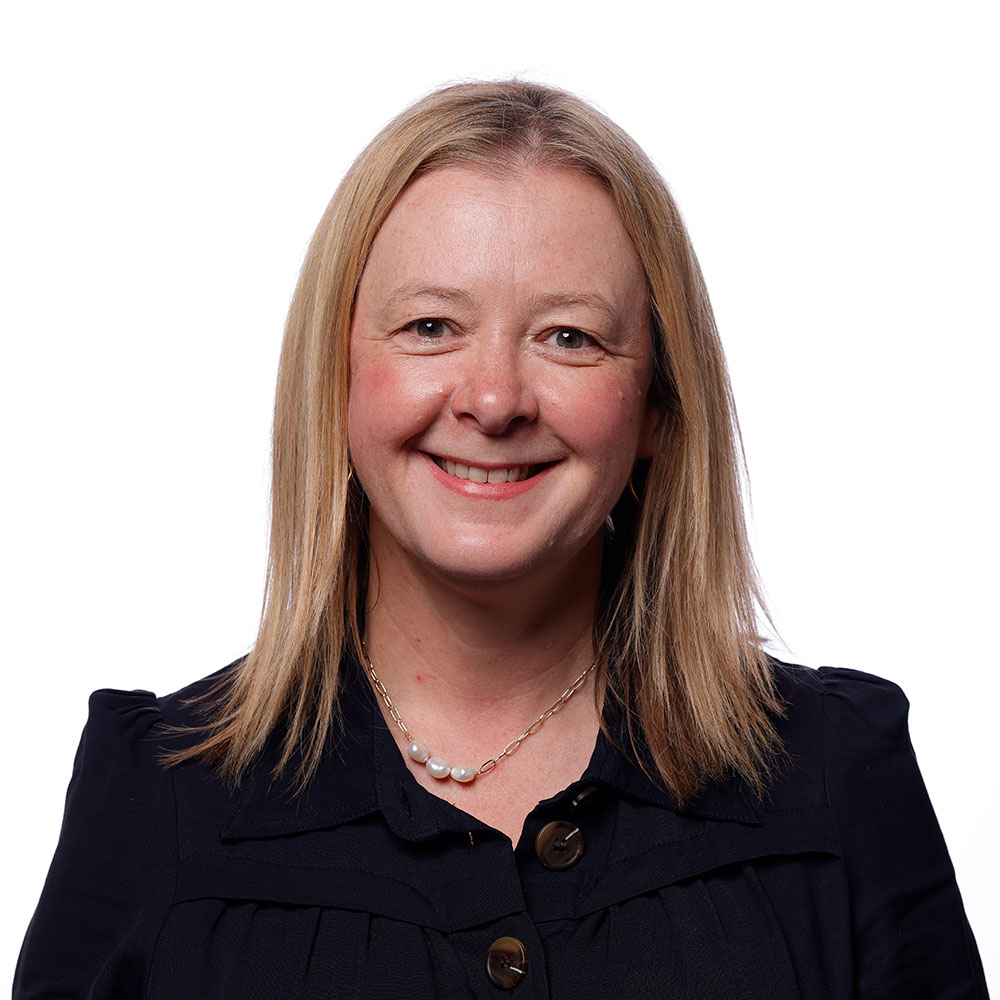
- Official portrait, 2026

Cabinet Secretary for Housing and Local Government (Note: Planning was included in Bryant's portfolio from July 2024 to September 2024)
- In office 17 July 2024 – 12 May 2026
- First Minister: Vaughan Gething; Eluned Morgan
- Preceded by: Julie James
- Succeeded by: Siân Gwenllian

Minister for Mental Health and Early Years
- In office 21 March 2024 – 17 July 2024
- First Minister: Vaughan Gething
- Preceded by: Lynne Neagle
- Succeeded by: Sarah Murphy

Member of the Senedd for Casnewydd Islwyn
- Incumbent
- Assumed office 8 May 2026

Member of the Senedd for Newport West
- In office 7 May 2016 – 7 May 2026
- Preceded by: Dame Rosemary Butler
- Succeeded by: Seat Abolished
- Majority: 3,906 (13.2%)

Personal details
- Born: Newport, Wales
- Party: Welsh Labour
- Education: Keele University
- Profession: Politician

Jayne Bryant is a Welsh Labour Party politician who has represented the Casnewydd Islwyn constituency since May 2026. She previously represented the Newport West in the Senedd from 2016 to 2026. Previously, she has served as Cabinet Secretary for Housing and Local Government from July 2024 to May 2026.

== Background ==
Bryant was born in the Royal Gwent Hospital in Newport. She attended St Julian's Comprehensive School and completed her studies at Keele University, graduating with a degree in History and Politics.

== Political career ==
She contested the Wales European Parliament constituency as the second-place candidate on the Labour list in 2014, but was not elected. She was subsequently selected as the Labour candidate for Newport West for the 2016 National Assembly for Wales election and was re-elected in at the 2021 Senedd election. She chaired the Senedd's Standards of Conduct committee from 2016 to 2021.

In 2017 she was one of the founders of the Purple Plaques scheme of public markers for remarkable women who lived in Wales.

Bryant supported Mark Drakeford in the 2018 Welsh Labour leadership election.

In December 2023, Jayne became the Co-Chair of Vaughan Gething's Welsh Labour leadership campaign alongside Ken Skates MS. She was appointed Minister for Mental Health and Early Years in the Gething government on 21 May 2024. After Gething stood down on 17 July 2024, Bryant was promoted to the role of Cabinet Secretary for Housing, Local Government and Planning, replacing Julie James, who had stood down to call for Gething's resignation. Under Gething's successor, Eluned Morgan, as first minister, Bryant retained the role through August, but lost the planning portfolio in Morgan's September 2024 reshuffle.

Bryant was re-elected at the 2026 Senedd election, being elected as the 5th place candidate.
