= Aberdare General Hospital =

- Cwm Taf Morgannwg University Health Board
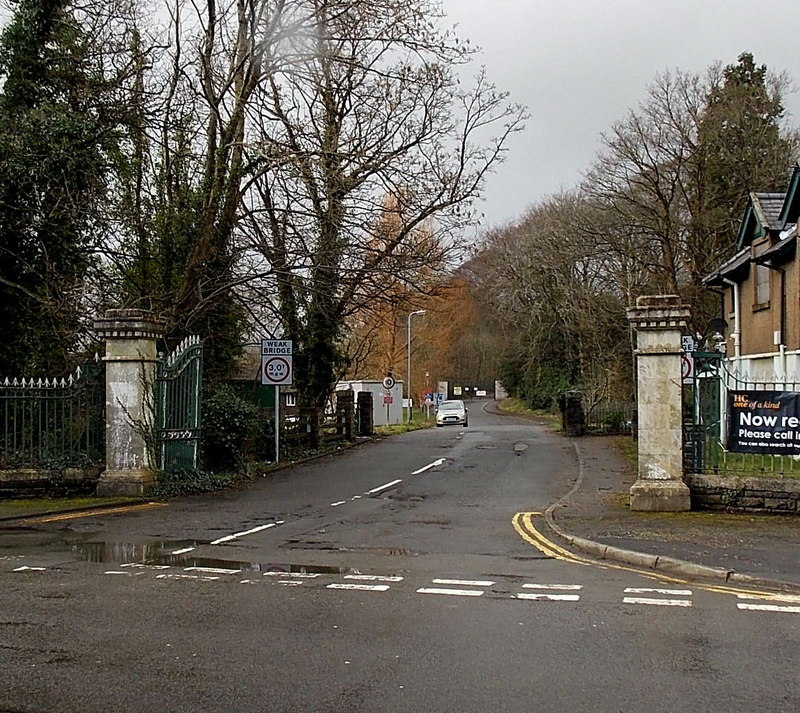
- Entrance to Aberdare General Hospital

- Shown in Rhondda Cynon Taf

Geography
- Location: Abernant Road, Aberdare, Rhondda Cynon Taf, Wales
- Coordinates: 51.7183°N 3.4408°W

Organisation
- Care system: NHS Wales
- Type: General

History
- Founded: 1917
- Closed: 2012

Links
- Lists: Hospitals in Wales

Aberdare General Hospital (Welsh: Ysbyty Cyffredinol Aberdâr) was a health facility on Abernant Road, Aberdare, Rhondda Cynon Taf, Wales. It was managed by the Cwm Taf Morgannwg University Health Board.

== History ==
The facility was opened by Joseph Shaw, chairman of the Powell Duffryn, in July 1917. After a major fire on 27 September 1929, the hospital was rebuilt and reopened by the Duchess of York in April 1933. It joined the National Health Service in 1948 but, after services transferred to the Ysbyty Cwm Cynon, Aberdare General Hospital closed in 2012.
