= Llwynypia =

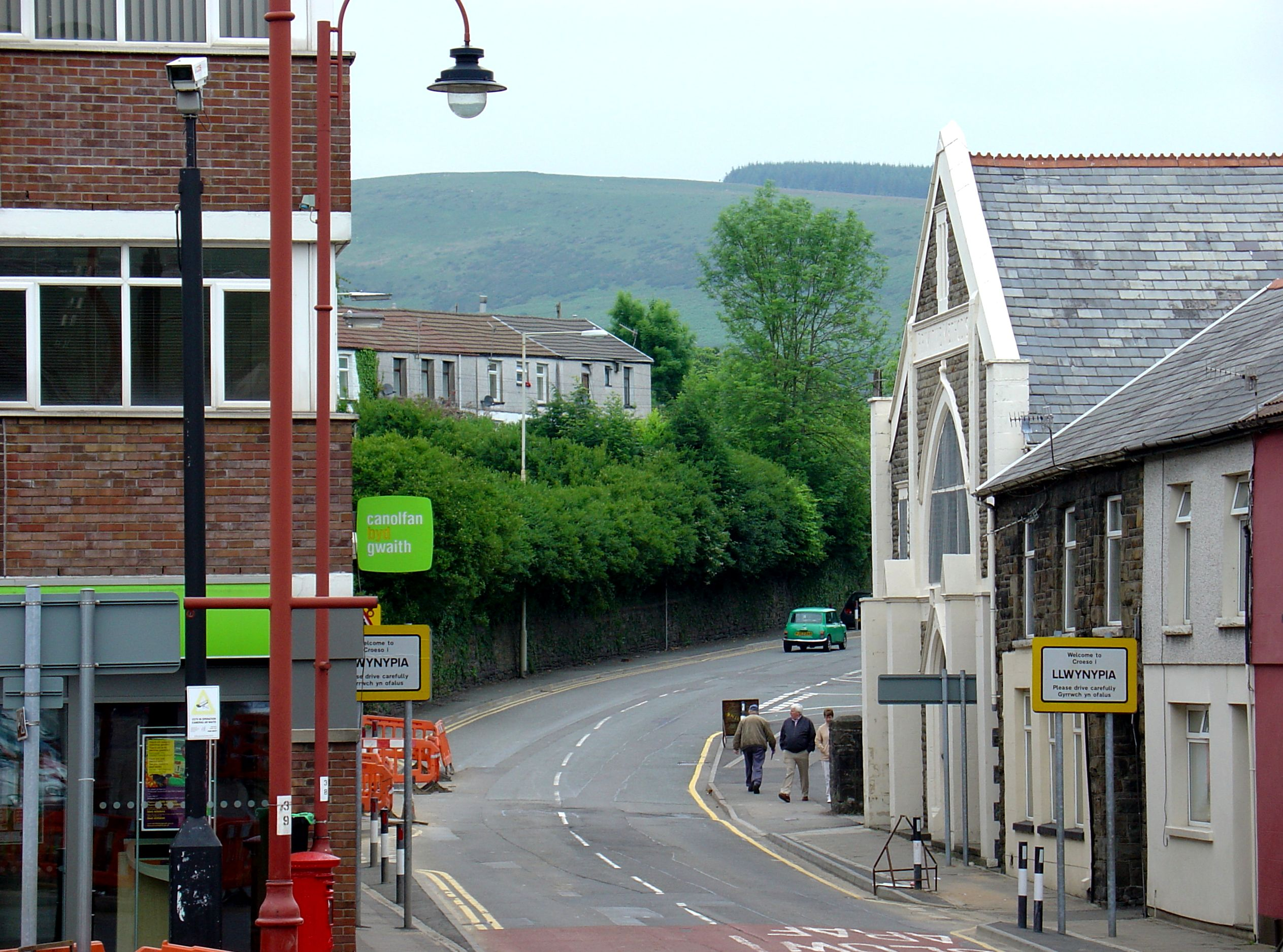
- Llwynypia Road from Tonypandy

- Location within Rhondda Cynon Taf
- Population: 2,253
- OS grid reference: SS998939
- Principal area: Rhondda Cynon Taf
- Preserved county: Mid Glamorgan
- Country: Wales
- Sovereign state: United Kingdom
- Post town: TONYPANDY
- Postcode district: CF40
- Dialling code: 01443
- Police: South Wales
- Fire: South Wales
- Ambulance: Welsh
- UK Parliament: Rhondda and Ogmore
- Senedd Cymru – Welsh Parliament: Afan Ogwr Rhondda
- List of places UK Wales Rhondda Cynon Taf 51.635141°N 3.448564°W Community map: Map of the community

Llwynypia (Welsh pronunciation: [ˌɬʊɪnəˈpiːja]) is a village and community (and electoral ward) in Rhondda Cynon Taf, Wales, near Tonypandy in the Rhondda Fawr Valley. Before 1850 a lightly populated rural farming area, Llwynypia experienced a population boom between 1860 and 1920 with the sinking of several coal mines after the discovery of large coal deposits throughout the Rhondda Valleys.

The Welsh name means "the grove of the Magpie" or "Magpie's Bush" and was taken from the name of a farm that once existed in the area.

== Early history ==
Situated on the River Rhondda Fawr where the river changes direction from south-east to southerly, Llwynypia holds evidence of human habitation from the Bronze Age through to modern times. On Mynydd y Gelli, a hill overlooking the area to the west, lies the Iron Age settlement of Hen Dre'r Gelli, a site which also has several Bronze Age cairns.

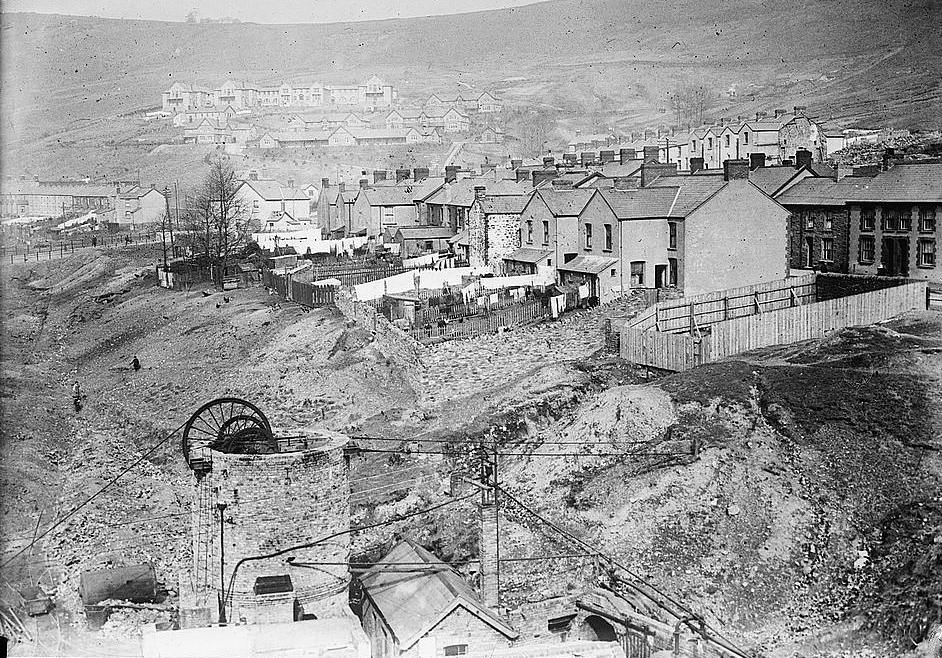
Llwynypia looking north towards Llwynypia Hospital, (c. 1912)

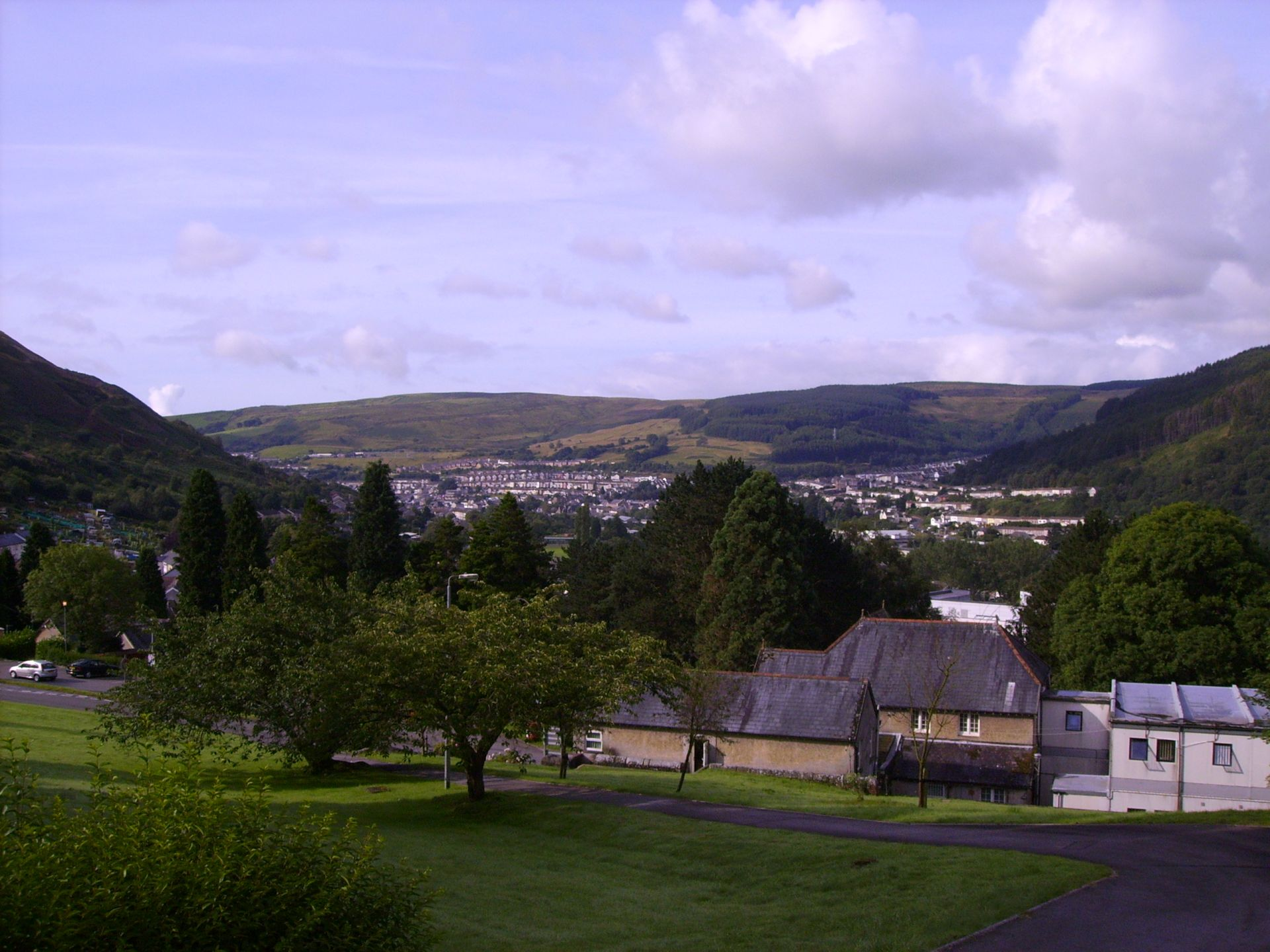
Looking south over Llwynypia from the Llwynypia Hospital

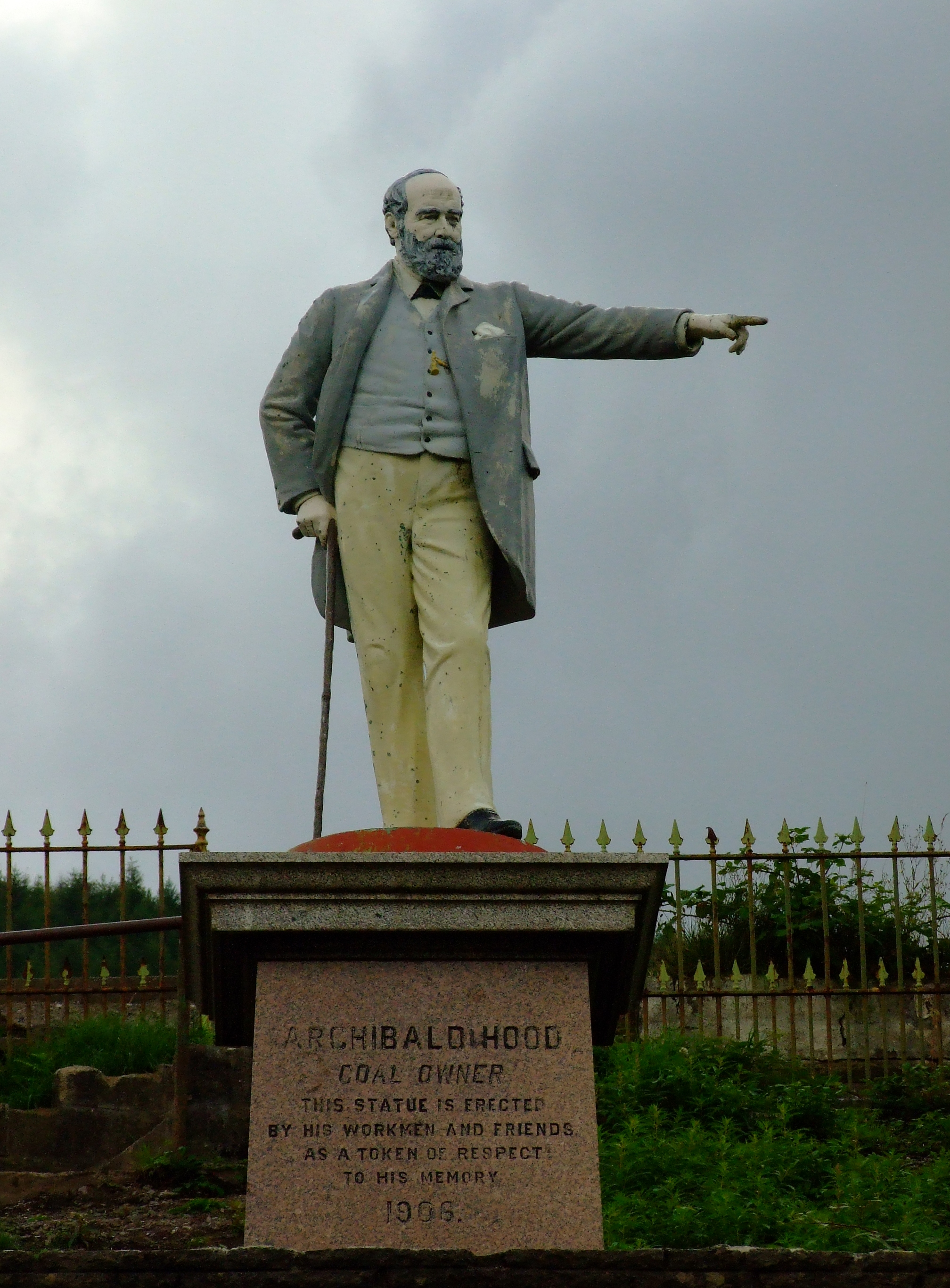
Statue of Archibald Hood originally stood in front of the now demolished Miners' Institute, known locally as "The Library"

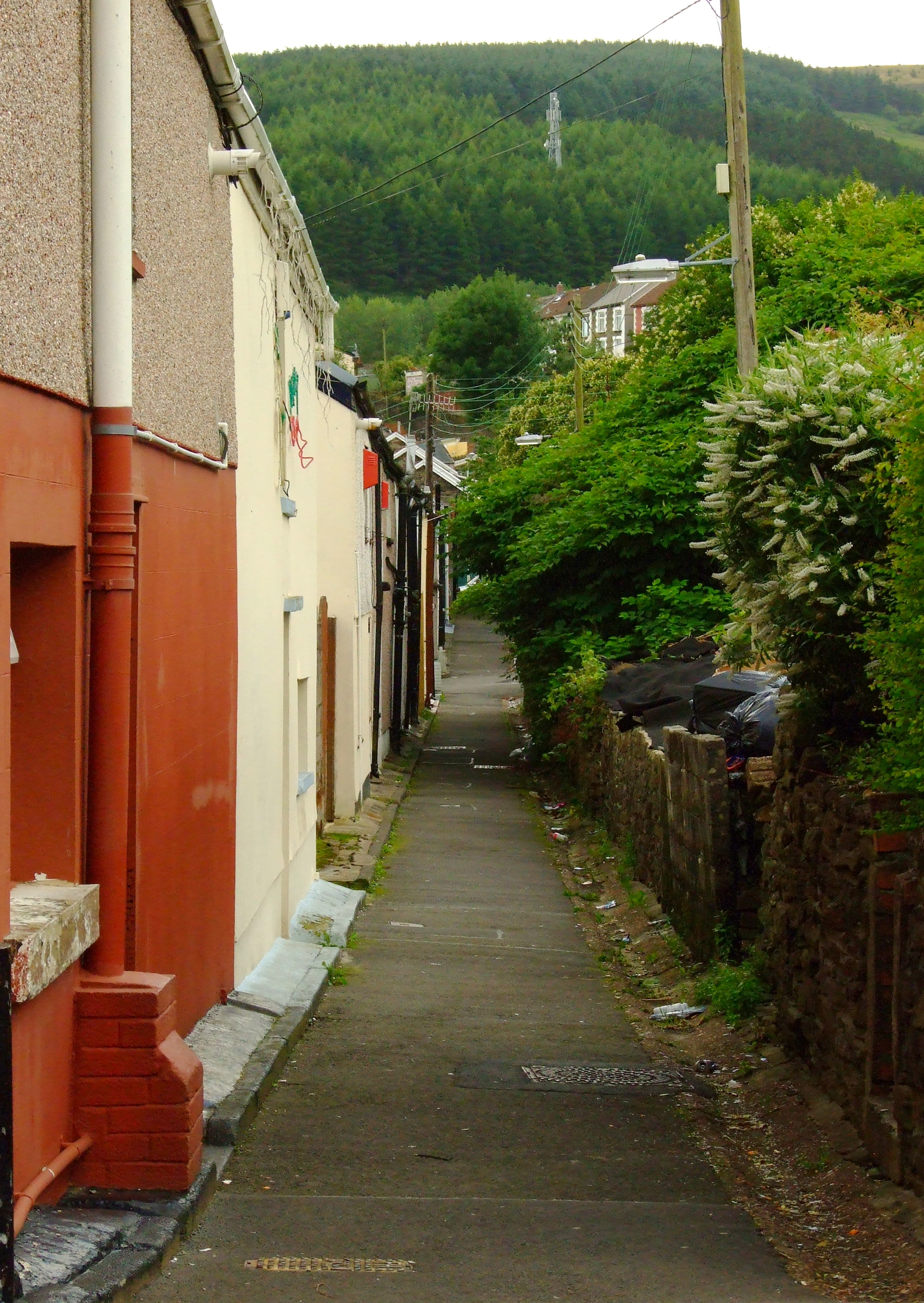
One of the narrow terraces of miners' cottages

In 1850 the first mine was sunk in the upper Rhondda in Treherbert but it was not until 1859 that Isaac Smith, manager of the Church Colliery, first attempted to prospect the area for coal when he opened a small level beneath Llwynypia Farm. After encountering numerous problems, Smith abandoned the level but in 1862 another entrepreneur, the Scottish mining engineer Archibald Hood, leased land at Llwynypia and sank the Llwynypia No. 1 pit in 1863. Although facing many difficulties at the No. 1 pit, Hood continued in his endeavours and by 1873 had sunk 4 more pits, now under the name of the Glamorgan Coal Company. Hood was a popular figure in the area and his mines became known as the 'Scotch mines', after Hood himself and the number of Scottish miners who followed him to live and work in Llwynypia. After Hood's death in 1902, he received many tributes from his workforce, and in 1906 a statue of him was unveiled by Rhondda MP William Abraham outside the Llwynypia Miners' institute. Much of the cost of the statue was met by donations from the miners of his pits.

In 1908 the Glamorgan Colliery became part of the Cambrian Combine Company and, in 1910–1911, was a scene of violent clashes during the Tonypandy riots.

The very high quality of Rhondda coal was recognised by the Admiralty which specified it as the fuel of choice for the steam ships of the Royal Navy from the late 19th century. The Llwynypia pits were extracting excellent coking coals and, by the time of World War I, the village housed around 140 coke ovens. By-products of the coke distillation process was used to light the mines and the narrow streets of miners' cottages known as "terraces". Some of the terraces have been widened but others remain so narrow that a single car can barely pass through.

On 25 January 1932, a gas explosion occurred at the colliery. Eleven workers were killed in the incident, two of whom were members of the rescue party. All perished after inhaling afterdamp following the explosion.

By 1936, of the original six pits opened at the Glamorgan, two remained in operation, employing only 560 workers, as against 2904 employed in 1923. The colliery was eventually closed in August 1945.

== Notable buildings ==
Built in the early 1900s on the site of the Glyncornel farm, owned by the DeWinton family, Hen Glyncornel is one of the most imposing houses in the village. Built by Archibald Hood for his son William, this building was then surpassed by nearby Glyncornel House which was built by the Cambrian Coal Combine for senior management, but was turned into a maternity hospital in 1939 by Rhondda Borough Council.

Llwynypia was also home to the largest hospital in the Rhondda. The old Llwynypia Hospital was built in 1903, originally as a workhouse, later becoming a general hospital. As the only village with maternity facilities in the Rhondda, most residents from the area over the last century have Llwynypia as their place of birth on their birth certificates. Llwynypia Hospital's accident and emergency unit was closed in the 1990s and the hospital closed completely in January 2010. It has been replaced by the new Ysbyty Cwm Rhondda.

Llwynypia Colliery Engine House (the Demon) Llwynypia Road, opposite Asda. Grade II listed building which was part of the Glamorgan colliery and known as the Scotch. The Engine house was the centre of the Tonypandy Riots in 1910 due to the colliery reliance on the building for power generation.

== Governance ==
The Llwyn-y-pia electoral ward is coterminous with the borders of the Llwynypia community and elects one county councillor to Rhondda Cynon Taf County Borough Council. Since 1995 representation has mainly been by the Labour Party but the ward had a Plaid Cymru councillor from 1999 to 2004.

A 2018 review of electoral arrangements by the Local Democracy and Boundary Commission for Wales would see Llwyn-y-pia merged with neighbouring Trealaw. The proposals would take effect from the 2022 council elections.

== Transport ==
The Llwynypia railway station is served and operated by Transport for Wales on the Rhondda Line from Cardiff.

== Education ==
One of the four main campuses of Coleg y Cymoedd is in Llwynypia.

== Sport and leisure ==
Llwynypia was once home to Llwynypia Rugby Football Club. The club played in the Glamorgan leagues and was affiliated to the Welsh Rugby Union providing many trialists and Welsh international rugby union players, for instance in 1900 when the Wales team that beat England at Gloucester included Hellings and Llewelyn, both of the Llwynypia club. The club disbanded in the 1930s during the depression like many Rhondda clubs, but unlike teams such as Treherbert, did not recover.

Welsh international footballer Rob Page was born in the village.

Llwynypia is the spiritual home of Field Archery in the UK. The Glyncornel Field Archery Centre became the home of Pentref Bowmen in 1967. The Club hosted the All British & Open Field Archery Championships for the first 25 years from its inception in 1967. It now hosts the national championships on a rotational basis with other UK venues.

The Field Archery World Championships were held at Glyncornel in September 1970. A clubhouse was built for the event and is still used for year-round indoor shooting.

The World Championships returned 38 years later when Llwynypia held the qualification rounds of the 2008 World Field Archery Championships.

== Notable people ==
See Category:People from Llwynypia

- Jayne Ludlow – international footballer for Wales
- Shelley Rees – actress, Stacey Jones in Pobol y Cwm
- Keith Burnett – Vice Chancellor of the University of Sheffield
- Hilary Tann - Composer
- Leanne Wood – Former Leader of Plaid Cymru
- Ian "H" Watkins – singer and one part of British pop group Steps
- Alun Pugh – former member of the Welsh Assembly, and former Minister for Culture, Welsh Language and Sport
- David Kelly - UN Weapons inspector
