= Ysbyty Cwm Rhondda =

- Cwm Taf Morgannwg University Health Board
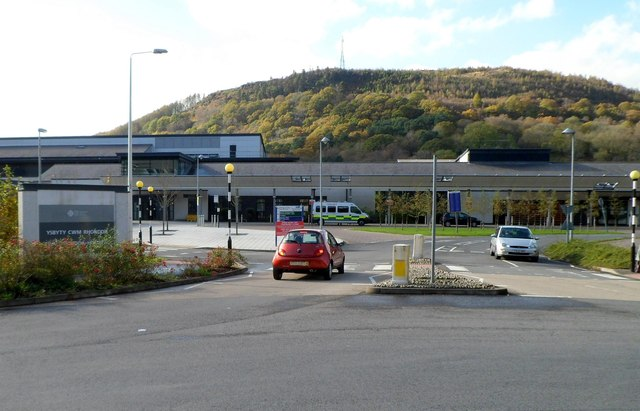
- Ysbyty Cwm Rhondda

- Shown in Rhondda Cynon Taf

Geography
- Location: Partridge Road, Llwynypia, Rhondda Cynon Taf, Wales
- Coordinates: 51.6366°N 3.4500°W

Organisation
- Care system: NHS Wales
- Type: General

History
- Founded: 2010

Links
- Lists: Hospitals in Wales

Ysbyty Cwm Rhondda (English: Rhondda Valley Hospital) is a health facility on Partridge Road, Llwynypia, Rhondda Cynon Taf, Wales. It is managed by the Cwm Taf Morgannwg University Health Board.

== History ==
The facility was commissioned to replace the aging Llwynypia Hospital in the town. The new facility, which was designed by Nightingale Associates and built by Cowlins on the site of a former coal mine at a cost of £36 million, opened in January 2010.
