= Glanrhyd Hospital =

- Cwm Taf University Health Board
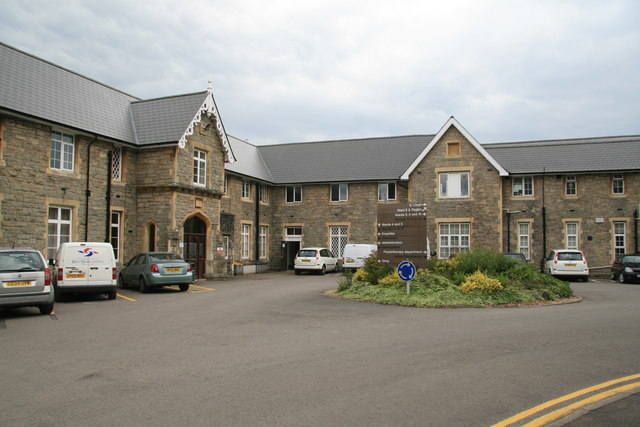
- Main entrance to Glanrhyd Hospital

- Shown in Bridgend County Borough

Geography
- Location: Pen-y-fai, Bridgend County Borough, Wales, United Kingdom
- Coordinates: 51.5257°N 3.5863°W

Organisation
- Care system: Public NHS
- Type: Specialist

Services
- Speciality: Psychiatric hospital

History
- Founded: 1864

Links
- Lists: Hospitals in Wales

Glanrhyd Hospital is a psychiatric hospital in Pen-y-fai near Bridgend in Wales. It is managed by the Cwm Taf University Health Board.

== History ==
The hospital, which was designed by William Martin and John Henry Chamberlain in the Gothic Revival style using a linear corridor layout, opened as the Glamorgan County Lunatic Asylum in November 1864. It became the Glamorgan County Mental Hospital in 1922 and it joined the National Health Service as Glanrhyd Hospital in 1948. A new low-secure unit, known as Taith Newydd ("New Journey"), was built on the site in 2014. In 2022 Cadw designated the hospital grounds at Grade II on its Cadw/ICOMOS Register of Parks and Gardens of Special Historic Interest in Wales. Its listing record notes the gardens' historic importance as a rare, and largely intact, example of the "designed gardens and grounds of a mid-nineteenth century asylum landscape."
