= Mynydd y Gelli =

Welsh mountain and archaeological site

Coordinates: 51°38′09″N 3°28′34″W

Mynydd Y Gelli is a hill that forms the Rhondda Valley in South Wales, United Kingdom. It lies to the south of the village of Gelli.

The name Mynydd Y Gelli is also used for the Iron Age burial site that lies on one of its sides above Tonypandy, Clydach Vale and Llwynypia. Another more grandiose name for the site is the Rhondda Stonehenge.
