= Maesteg Community Hospital =

- Cwm Taf Morgannwg University Health Board
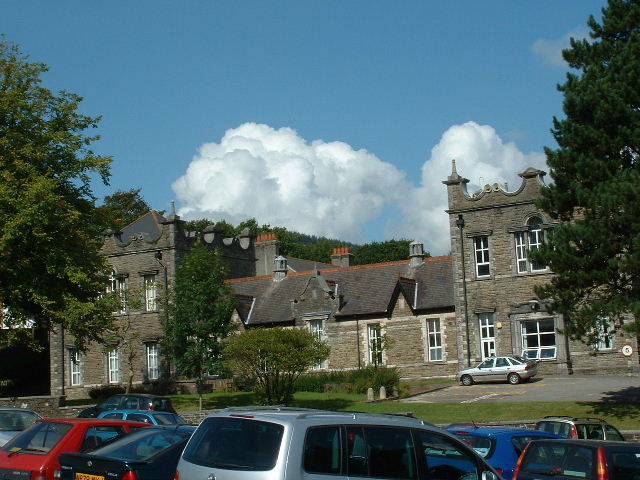
- Maesteg Community Hospital

- Shown in Bridgend County Borough

Geography
- Location: Maesteg, Wales, United Kingdom
- Coordinates: 51.6104°N 3.6694°W

Organisation
- Care system: NHS Wales
- Type: Community hospital

Services
- Emergency department: No

History
- Founded: 1914

Maesteg Community Hospital (Welsh: Ysbyty Cymunedol Maesteg) is a community hospital in Maesteg, Wales. It is managed by Cwm Taf Morgannwg University Health Board.

== History ==
The hospital has its origins in a temporary facility established for injured servicemen in 1914. It was built by the miners of the Llynfi valley. The current hospital, which was designed by Mr J Humphreys as a permanent facility and built by Mr Tom Thomas, opened later in the war. It subsequently became a maternity hospital. In the 1930s a children's ward was built and decorated with panels of nursery rhyme tiles. The hospital, which was run by the miners, joined the National Health Service as Maesteg General Hospital in 1948.

As at 2026 a new hospital is planned as the current one is unable to meet the need for expanded services.
