= Pontypridd Graig railway station =

Former railway station in Wales

Pontypridd Graig

General information
- Location: Pontypridd, Rhondda Cynon Taf; Wales
- Coordinates: 51.5982°N 3.3453°W
- Grid reference: ST069896

Other information
- Status: Disused

History
- Original company: Barry Railway
- Pre-grouping: Barry Railway
- Post-grouping: Great Western Railway

Key dates
- 16 March 1896: Station opened as Pontypridd
- 1 July 1924: Renamed Pontypridd Graig
- 5 May 1930: Station closed
Location

Pontypridd Graig railway station was a railway station located in the South Wales valleys town of Pontypridd, on the Barry Railway. Although the line was opened for mineral traffic on 18 July 1889 to take coal from Rhondda to the Docks, the passenger service did not start until 16 March 1896 after much lobbying from local residents along the line. On that date, Barry services commenced between the Taff Vale station at Porth and Barry where the train terminated in the bay platform (Platform 4). On 7 June 1897, a new passenger service began between Pontypridd and Cardiff Clarence Road via St Fagans and Cardiff Riverside. Train journeys commenced at Pontypridd because the Taff Vale was not willing to allow direct competition with its own services from Porth to Cardiff Queen Street. The station was closed to passengers on 5 May 1930 by the GWR who diverted trains via Treforest Junction to its main station at Pontypridd Central.

== History ==
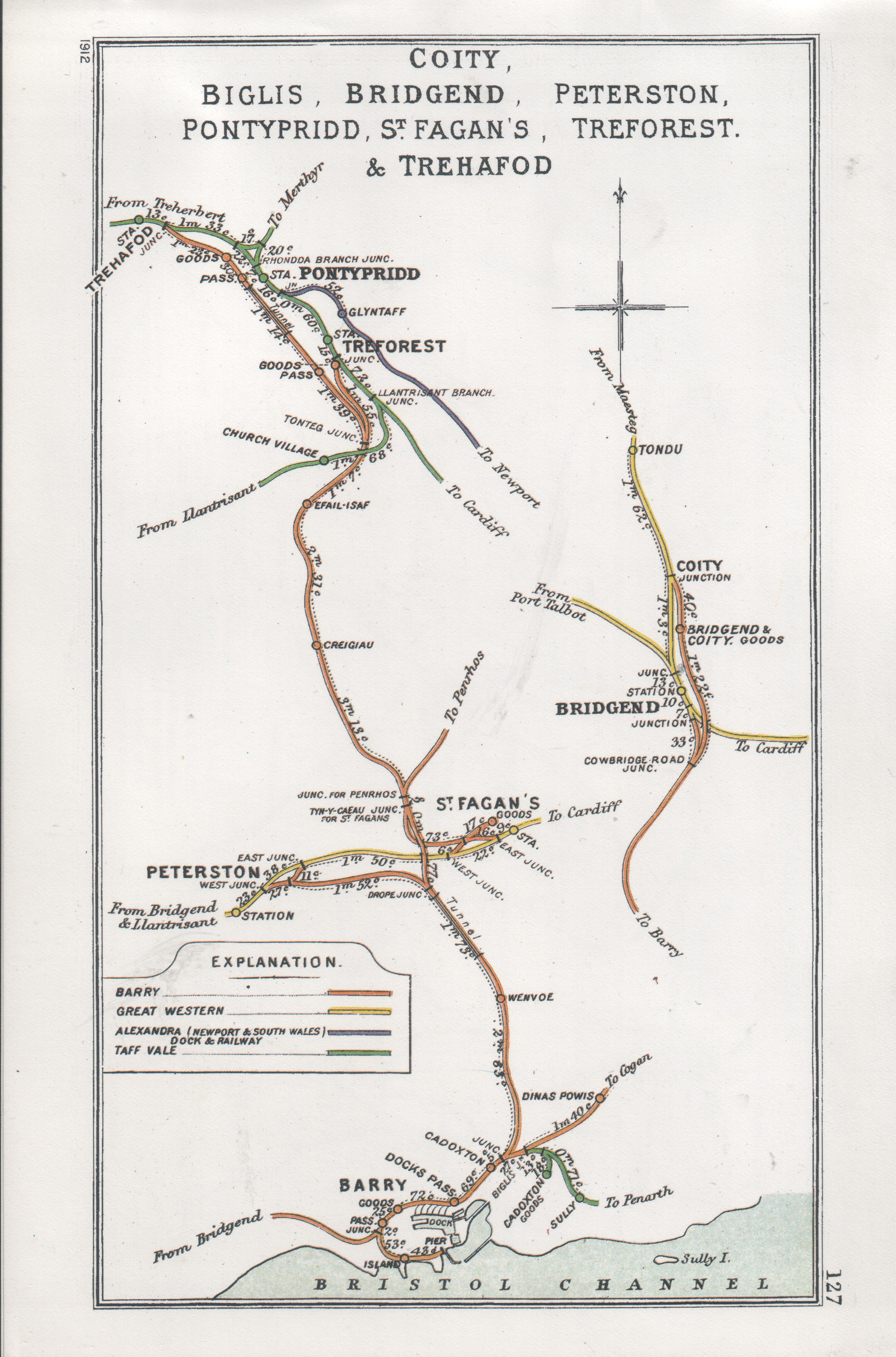
A 1912 Railway Clearing House Junction Diagram showing railways in the vicinity of Pontypridd (upper left). Barry Railway in orange; Taff Vale Railway in green.

The station was opened by the Barry Railway on 16 March 1896.

The Barry Railway was amalgamated with the Great Western Railway on 1 January 1922, and the station was renamed Pontypridd Graig on 1 July 1924, to avoid confusion with the former Taff Vale Railway station, which had also been named Pontypridd, and which was renamed Pontypridd Central the same year.

Passenger services along the former Barry line north of Tonteg Junction were diverted via Treforest Low Level (also on the former Taff Vale Railway) and Pontypridd Central from 5 May 1930, and Pontypridd Graig station was closed.

== Present day ==
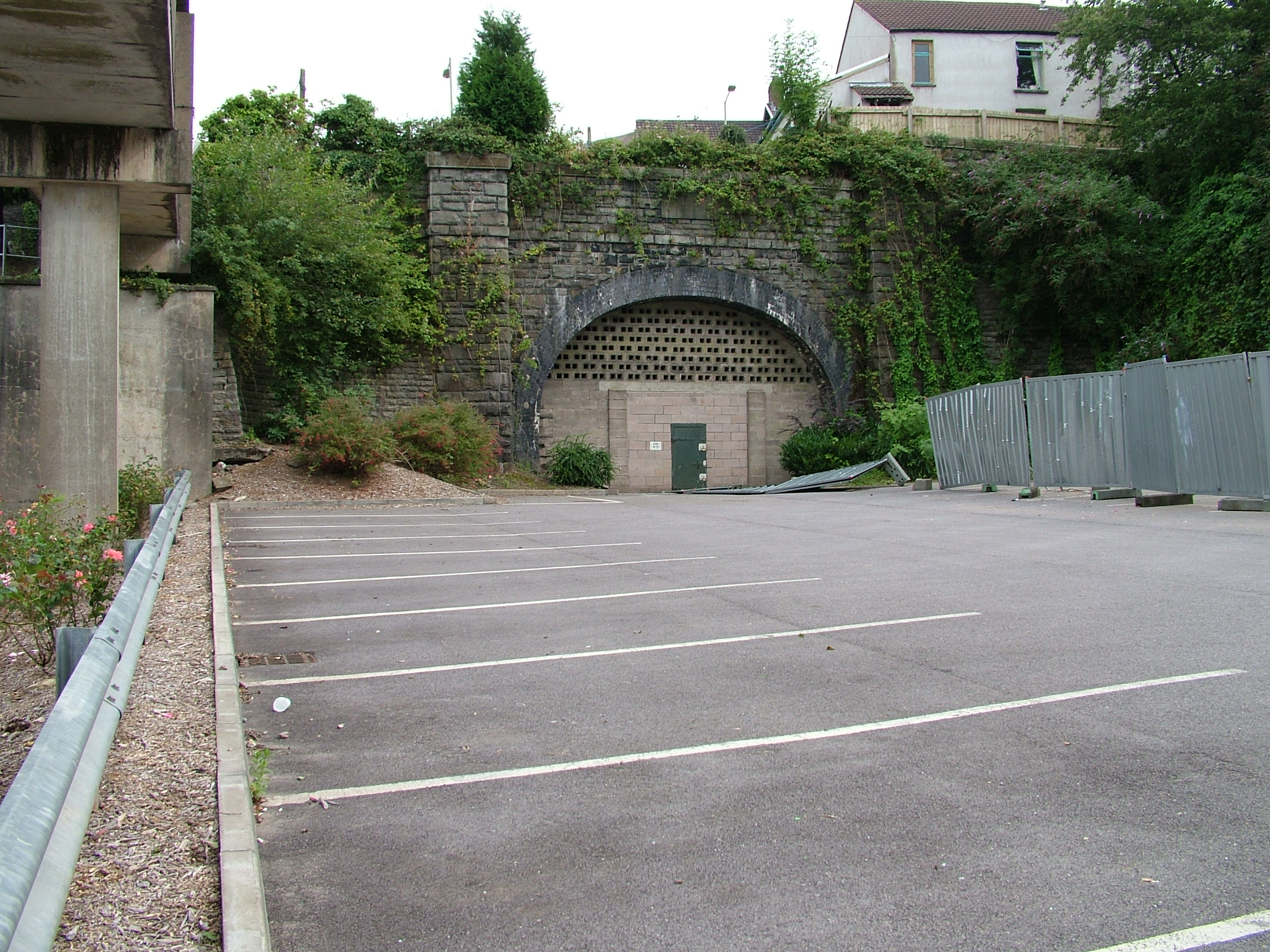
The tunnel mouth of Pontypridd Graig station

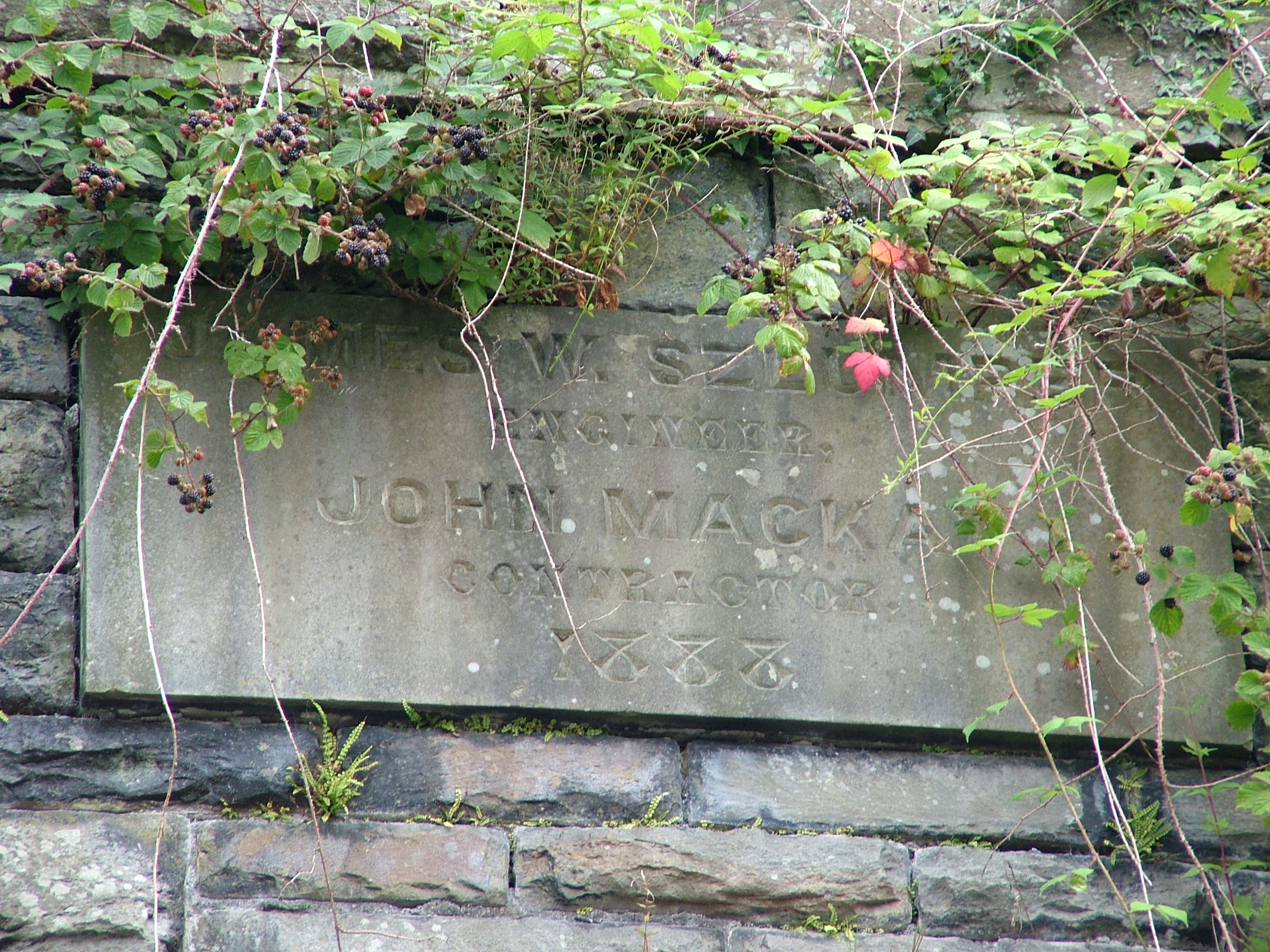
The inscription above the tunnel mouth of Pontypridd Graig station

Today, nothing of the station or platforms remain. The tunnel mouth is situated in the grounds of Dewi Sant Hospital car park, just behind the modern day Pontypridd railway station, on Albert Road, the Graig, Pontypridd. The other end of the tunnel is in the grounds of the University of South Wales, which is some distance away.

Preceding station	Disused railways	Following station
Trehafod; Line closed, station open	Barry Railway; Porth-Barry and Pontypridd-Cardiff Clarence Road	Treforest High Level; Line and station closed
