= Cabinet Secretary for Housing (Wales) =

Former Welsh Government minister

Cabinet Secretary for Housing of Wales
- Ysgrifennydd y Cabinet dros Tai (Welsh)
- Welsh Government
- Style: Welsh Cabinet Secretary
- Status: Cabinet Secretary
- Member of: Senedd; Cabinet
- Reports to: the Senedd and the First Minister of Wales
- Seat: Cardiff
- Nominator: First Minister of Wales
- Appointer: The Crown
- Term length: Five years; Subject to elections to the Senedd which take place every five years
- First holder: Peter Law AM (as Secretary for Housing)

The Cabinet Secretary for Housing (Welsh: Ysgrifennydd y Cabinet dros Tai) was a member of the Cabinet in the Welsh Government. The most recent office holder was Jayne Bryant from 2024 to 2026. The housing role is currently held by the Cabinet Minister for Local Government, Housing and Planning.

== Ministers ==
Name	Picture	Entered office	Left office	Other offices held	Political party	Government
Secretary for Housing
Peter Law		22 February 2000	16 October 2000	Secretary for Local Government	Labour	Interim Morgan administration
Minister for Housing
Jane Davidson		19 July 2007	2011	Minister for Sustainability Minister for Environment (from December 2009 under Jones)	Labour	Fourth Morgan government First Jones government
Minister for Housing, Regeneration & Heritage
Huw Lewis		13 May 2011	2013		Labour	Second Jones government
Minister for Housing
Julie James		13 December 2018	2021	Minister for Local Government	Labour	First Drakeford government
Minister for Climate Change (with housing portfolio)
Julie James		13 May 2021	20 March 2024		Labour	Second Drakeford government
Cabinet Secretary for Housing
Julie James		21 March 2024	16 July 2024	Cabinet Secretary for Local Government Planning portfolio	Labour	Gething government
Jayne Bryant		17 July 2024	8 May 2026	Cabinet Secretary for Local Government Planning portfolio (July–September 2024)	Labour	Gething government Eluned Morgan government

== Responsibilities ==
The post's responsibilities are:

- Housing and planning responsibilities
  - Overseeing housing and its related activities conducted by housing associations and local authorities, such as the management of housing and the allocation of affordable and social housing.
  - The supply and quality of market-sector, affordable and social housing.
  - Second homes in Wales
  - Housing advice and homelessness
  - Private rented sector housing matters, and registered social landlord regulation
  - Aids and adaptations, such as the Physical Adaptation Grants and Disabled Facilities Grants
  - Housing-related support provision, excluding Housing Benefit payment
  - Local authority-led commercial tenancies regulation
  - National Infrastructure Commission
  - Planning acts implementation and oversight, as well as the oversight and implementation of all aspects of Wales' planning policy and the determination of called-in planning applications and planning appeals.
  - Planning gain, and using Town and Country Planning Act 1990 section 106 agreements.
  - "Developments of National Significance", determining planning applications and any connected consents.
  - Building regulations
  - Future Wales: the national plan 2040
  - Regeneration, including the use of Strategic Regeneration Areas; legacy regeneration; Transforming Town Centres programme and provision of sites and premises, derelict land and environmental improvements relating to regeneration.

== See also ==
- Government of Wales
- Ministry
