= Dewi Sant Hospital =

Hospital in Pontypridd, south Wales

- Cwm Taf Morgannwg University Health Board
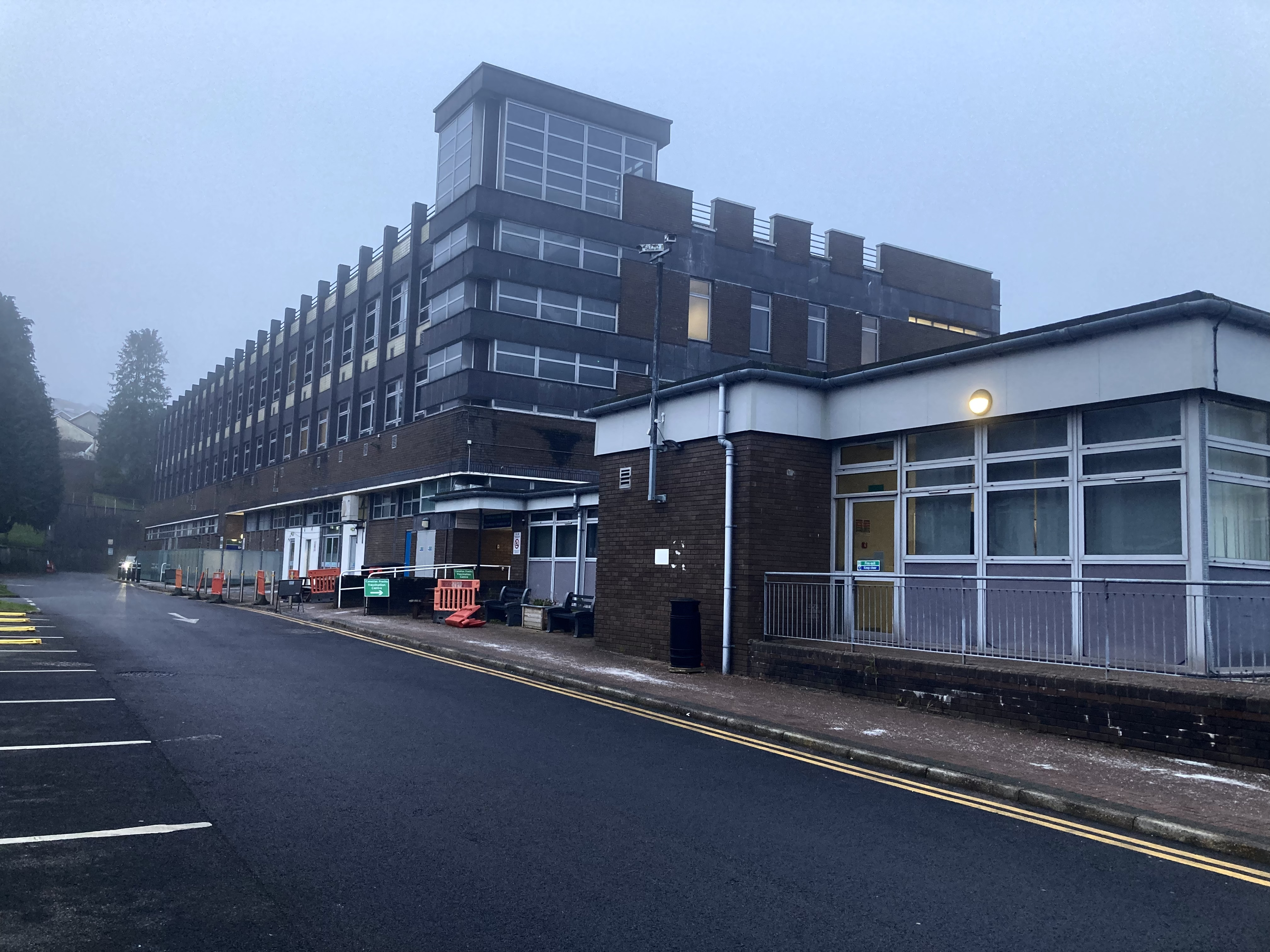
- Dewi Sant Hospital

- Shown in Rhondda Cynon Taf

Geography
- Location: Pontypridd, Rhondda Cynon Taf, Wales, United Kingdom
- Coordinates: 51.5981°N 3.3438°W

Organisation
- Care system: Local authority and private subscription to 1948; NHS from 1948
- Type: General
- Affiliated university: Cardiff University
- Network: Cwm Taf Morgannwg University Health Board

Services
- Emergency department: No

History
- Founded: 1865

Dewi Sant Hospital (Welsh: Ysbyty Dewi Sant) is a small hospital on Albert Road, in Pontypridd, Rhondda Cynon Taf, Wales. It is managed by the Cwm Taf Morgannwg University Health Board.

== History ==
The hospital has its origins in the Pontypridd Union Workhouse which was completed in 1865. An infirmary and isolation hospital were built on the site in the late 19th century. The tunnel mouth of Pontypridd Graig railway station, which emerges into in the hospital car park, was last used in 1930.

The complex joined the National Health Service as Graig Hospital in 1948. After the war it became a geriatric hospital before being completely re-built as Dewi Sant Hospital in the 1960s.
