= Ysbyty George Thomas =

- Cwm Taf Morgannwg University Health Board
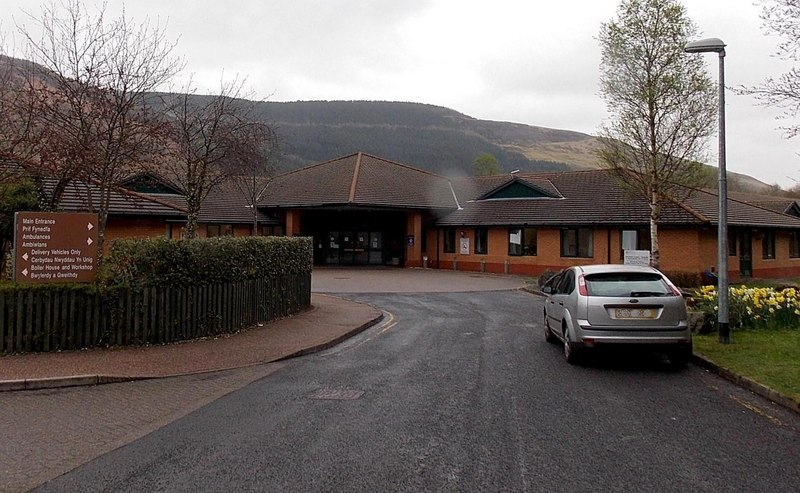
- Ysbyty George Thomas

- Shown in Rhondda Cynon Taf

Geography
- Location: Cwmparc Road, Treorchy, Rhondda Cynon Taf, Wales
- Coordinates: 51.6552°N 3.5036°W

Organisation
- Care system: NHS Wales
- Type: General

History
- Founded: 1991

Links
- Lists: Hospitals in Wales

Ysbyty George Thomas (English: George Thomas Hospital) is a health facility on Cwmparc Road, Treorchy, Rhondda Cynon Taf, Wales. It is managed by the Cwm Taf Morgannwg University Health Board.

== History ==
The facility was officially opened by the former Speaker of the House of Commons, Lord Tonypandy, after which it is named, in 1991. The new facility was built on the site of a former coal mine. In 2018, three wards were closed to facilitate the creation of a health and well-being centre.
