= Archibald Hood =

Scottish engineer and coalowner (1823-1902)

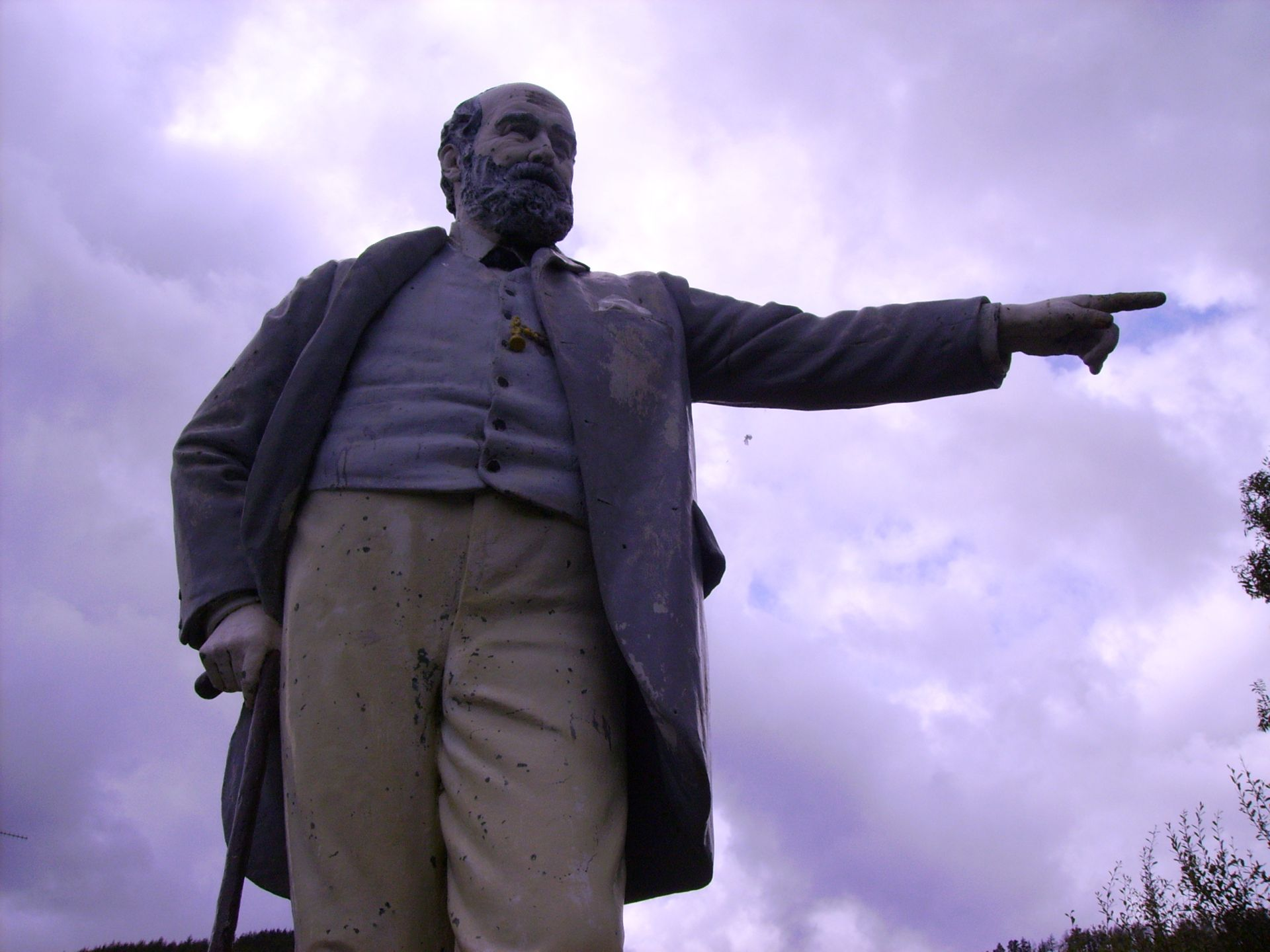
- Statue of Hood at Llwynypia
- Born: Archibald Hood; June 1823; Kilmarnock, Scotland
- Died: 27 October 1902 (aged 79); Cardiff, Wales
- Occupations: coalowner and industrialist
- Years active: 1856–1902
- Children: James Hood

Archibald Hood (June 1823 – 27 October 1902) was a Scottish engineer and coalowner who became an important figure in the industrial growth of the Rhondda Valley. The son of a colliery official, Hood would make his name as a coalowner of collieries first in Scotland and later in Llwynypia in South Wales.

== History ==
=== Early history ===
Hood was born in June 1823 in Kilmarnock, Ayrshire. His father was a colliery foreman. His mother had died, so Hood's father brought him up alone, and he received little education – aged thirteen he was employed at his father's colliery. At the age of 17, after his father was promoted to colliery manager, Hood was able to take classes and qualified as a mining engineer.

In 1856 Hood began expanding his business; leasing Whitehill Colliery at Rosewell (then owned by Archibald Primrose, 4th Earl of Rosebery). His successes in expanding and improving the Rosewell colliery allowed Hood to expand his operations, and he soon managed several pits in the area (including Carrington and Polton, to which he extended the railway lines). Hood not only improved the mines in his ownership, he also made provision to improve the living conditions for his workers. He built houses for his workers and their families, and ensured that each house had a garden to provide a small holding. Hood set up home in Rosewell, living at Rosedale house with his family.

=== Welsh interests ===
In 1860, Hood joined the Ely Valley Coal Company in Tonyrefail in the Rhondda in Wales, an area which was undergoing a massive industrial coal boom. He bought Gilfach House in Gilfach Goch, from where he would live during his initial years in the Rhondda. In 1862 he changed the name of the Ely Valley Coal Company to the Glamorgan Coal Company and took ownership of it. In March 1863, after acquiring mineral rights from the local land owners, he sank a pit in Llwynypia. In 1864 the pit reached the No.2 seam and 1865 the No.3 seam was reached. His colliery at Llwynypia was known for the high level of Scottish workers who followed Hood to the area and for the quality of the coke from the site. To protect his interests in the Welsh coalfields he moved permanently to Wales in 1867, residing with his family at 'Sherwood' on Newport Road in Cardiff, though he kept ownership of Rosedale in Rosewell.

As he had done so in Scotland, Hood also ensured that homes were built for his workers. Following the model in Rosewell, Hood ensured the buildings each had their own garden, and these building in Llwynypia became known as the 'Scotch Houses'. Hood also ensured that an education system existed for the children of his workers, he built a miners' institute, which housed a library and a swimming baths for sporting interests.

During the 1880s Hood became a leading promoter in the construction of a new railway line to Barry, Vale of Glamorgan, in a bid to find an alternative route to the monopoly controlled by the Taff Vale Railway and Cardiff Docks. He and other pit owners persuaded David Davies of Ocean Collieries, to develop a dock at Barry, which Davies saw to fruition in 1889. Davies placed himself as deputy chairman of the newly formed Barry Railway Company, but died just a year after its completion in 1890. Hood took over as deputy chairman on Davies' death and saw through line expansions as well as the construction of the number 2 dock in Barry.

Despite now being based in Wales, Hood ensured that his businesses in Scotland continued to grow. In 1890 he arranged for the amalgamation of his Whitehill colliery in Midlothian with the Newbattle pits owned by Schomberg Kerr, 9th Marquess of Lothian. The resulting company was known as Lothian Coal Company. Around this time his son, James Hood (1859–1941), became general manager of the Lothian Coal Company, moving back to Scotland.

=== Death ===
Hood died in Cardiff on 27 October 1902. Due to the high esteem in which he was held, his workers decided to fund a memorial in his honour. The miners contributed to a statue to be built, amassing over £600 for its construction. The 7ft6inch bronze statue was erected on the grounds of Llwynypia Library, pointing towards his colliery and was unveiled in July 1906 by William Abraham (Mabon). It was the first public statue in the Rhondda.

== Bibliography ==
- Blythe, Archie (1994). From Rosewell to the Rhondda: Story of Archibald Hood, a Great Scots Mining Engineer. ISBN 0-9511915-7-8.
- Carpenter, David J. (2000). Rhondda Collieries. Stroud, Gloucestershire: Tempus Publishing. ISBN 0-7524-1730-4.
