= Mountain Ash General Hospital =

- Cwm Taf Morgannwg University Health Board
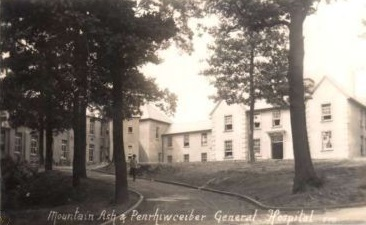
- Mountain Ash General Hospital

- Shown in Rhondda Cynon Taf

Geography
- Location: Duffryn Road, Mountain Ash, Rhondda Cynon Taf, Wales
- Coordinates: 51.6898°N 3.3823°W

Organisation
- Care system: NHS Wales
- Type: General

History
- Founded: 1910
- Closed: 2012

Links
- Lists: Hospitals in Wales

Mountain Ash General Hospital (Welsh: Ysbyty Cyffredinol Mountain Ash) was a health facility on Duffryn Road, Mountain Ash, Rhondda Cynon Taf, Wales. It was managed by the Cwm Taf Morgannwg University Health Board.

== History ==
The facility has its origins in the Mountain Ash Cottage Hospital which was established in 1910. The current structure was opened by Lord Aberdare as the Mountain Ash and Penrhiwceiber General Hospital in 1924. It joined the National Health Service as Mountain Ash General Hospital in 1948 but, after services transferred to the Ysbyty Cwm Cynon, the general hospital closed in 2012. It was demolished in 2017 after a suspected arson attack that destroyed the main building.
