= Ynysmaerdy =

Coordinates: 51.549789°N 3.395212°W

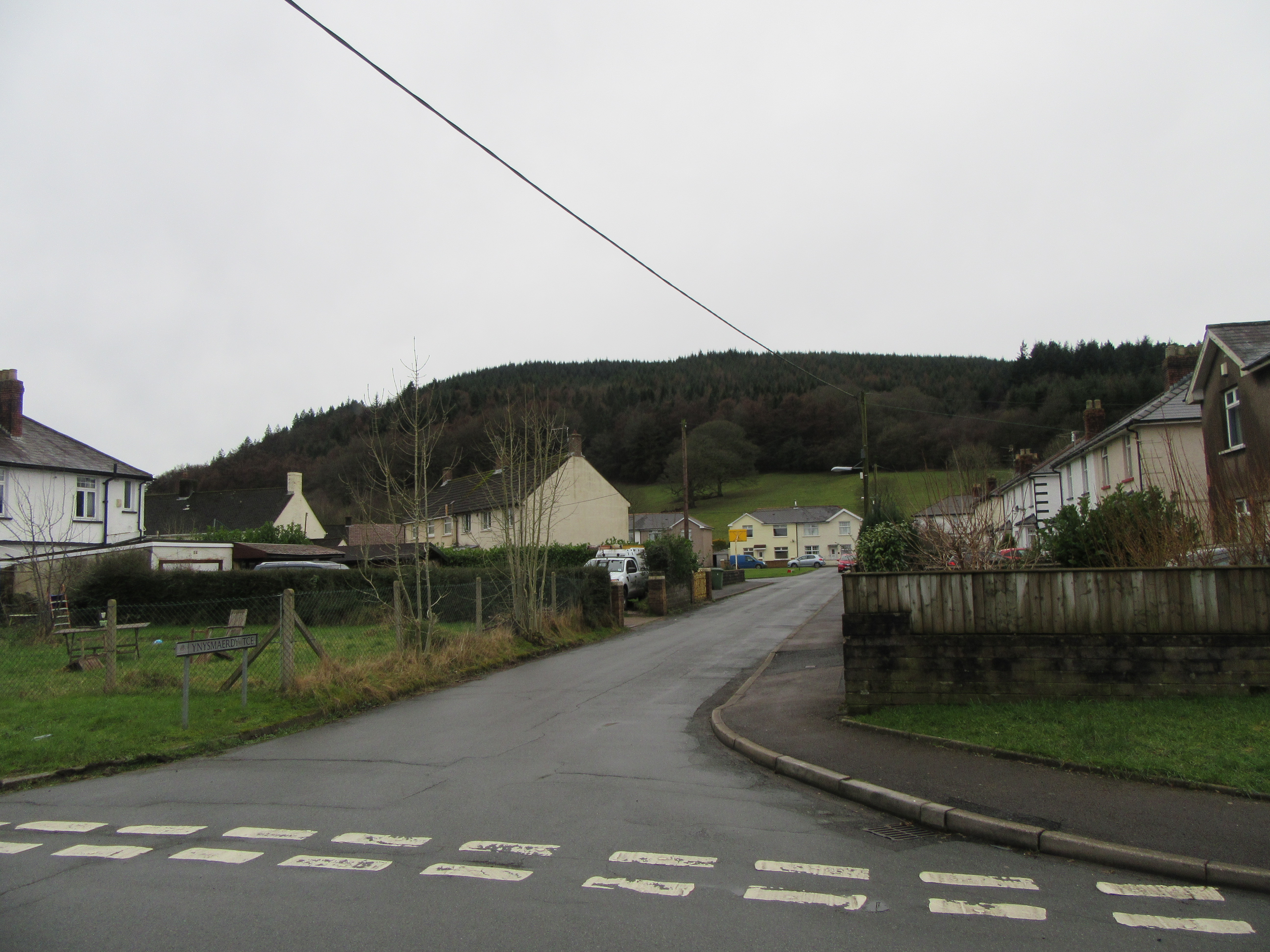

- Location within Rhondda Cynon Taf
- OS grid reference: ST033843
- Principal area: Rhondda Cynon Taf
- Preserved county: Mid Glamorgan
- Country: Wales
- Sovereign state: United Kingdom
- Post town: Pontyclun
- Postcode district: CF72
- Dialling code: 01443
- Police: South Wales
- Fire: South Wales
- Ambulance: Welsh
- UK Parliament: Pontypridd
- Senedd Cymru – Welsh Parliament: Ogmore

Ynysmaerdy is a village near Talbot Green and Llantrisant in Rhondda Cynon Taf, Wales. Even though there is no direct access to the village of Llanharan, due to older parish boundaries it falls under the community of Llanharan. It is home to the Royal Glamorgan Hospital.
