= East Glamorgan General Hospital =

Former NHS hospital in Wales

- Shown in Rhondda Cynon Taf

Geography
- Location: Church Village, near Pontypridd, Rhondda Cynon Taf, Wales
- Coordinates: 51.5648°N 3.3294°W

Organisation
- Care system: NHS Wales
- Type: General

History
- Founded: 1938

The East Glamorgan General Hospital (Welsh: Ysbyty Cyffredinol Dwyrain Morgannwg) was an NHS hospital in Church Village near Pontypridd, Wales, which operated from 1938 to 1999. The site has been demolished and redeveloped for housing.

== History ==
The hospital opened in Church Village in 1938. During the Second World War, it was used by the Royal Air Force. Princess Diana opened the Children's centre there on 7 October 1992. After the Royal Glamorgan Hospital in Talbot Green opened in November 1999, East Glamorgan General Hospital was demolished and the land used for housing.

== Efficiency ==
By 31 December 1995, 76% of patients were assessed within five minutes of arrival at the hospital's accident and emergency department, and over 90% of casualty patients were given a hospital bed within two hours of the decision time for admission.
