= Cwm Taf Morgannwg University Health Board =

NHS local health board in South Wales

- Bwrdd lechyd Prifysgol Cwm Taf Morgannwg

- Map of service area in Wales
- Former name: Cwm Taf University Health Board
- Type: NHS Wales local health board
- Established: 1 October 2009
- Headquarters: Ynysmeurig House, Navigation Park, Abercynon
- Region served: Bridgend County Borough; Merthyr Tydfil County Borough; Rhondda Cynon Taf
- Hospitals: Dewi Sant Hospital; Glanrhyd Hospital; Maesteg Community Hospital; Pontypridd Cottage Hospital; Prince Charles Hospital; Princess of Wales Hospital; Royal Glamorgan Hospital; Ysbyty Cwm Cynon; Ysbyty Cwm Rhondda; Ysbyty George Thomas
- Staff: 12,685 (2023/24)
- Website: ctmuhb.nhs.wales

Cwm Taf Morgannwg University Health Board (CTMUHB) (Welsh: Bwrdd lechyd Prifysgol Cwm Taf Morgannwg) is the local health board of NHS Wales for Merthyr Tydfil, Rhondda Cynon Taf, and Bridgend in the south of Wales. It was renamed from Cwm Taf University Health Board on 1 April 2019 following the transfer of Bridgend County Borough from the former Abertawe Bro Morgannwg University Health Board (now Swansea Bay University Health Board).

It was established in 2009 as the legal successor organisation to Cwm Taf NHS Trust (Welsh: Ymddiriedolaeth GIG Cwm Taf). The Trust was formed on 1 April 2008, following the merger of the North Glamorgan and Pontypridd & Rhondda NHS Trusts. Cwm Taf Morgannwg University Health Board is the operational name of Cwm Taf Morgannwg Local Health Board.

Cwm Taf Morgannwg University Health Board provides healthcare services mainly for the population of Merthyr Tydfil County Borough, Rhondda Cynon Taf County Borough and (from 1 April 2019) Bridgend County Borough. Cwm Taf Morgannwg NHS Trust's headquarters are in Ynysmeurig House, Navigation Park, Abercynon, Wales.

== Performance ==
Maternity services have been put into special measures in April 2019 after investigations into the standards of maternity care.

== Hospitals ==
Current hospitals

- Dewi Sant Hospital, Pontypridd
- Glanrhyd Hospital, Bridgend
- Maesteg Community Hospital, Bridgend
- Pontypridd Cottage Hospital, Pontypridd
- Prince Charles Hospital, Merthyr Tydfil
- Princess of Wales Hospital, Bridgend
- Royal Glamorgan Hospital, Llantrisant
- Ysbyty Cwm Cynon, Cynon Valley
- Ysbyty Cwm Rhondda, Rhondda
- Ysbyty George Thomas, Treorchy

Former Hospitals

- Aberdare General Hospital, Aberdare, Cynon Valley
- Mountain Ash General Hospital, Mountain Ash, Cynon Valley
- St Tydfil's General Hospital, Merthyr Tydfil
