= Prince Charles Hospital =

- Cwm Taf Morgannwg University Health Board
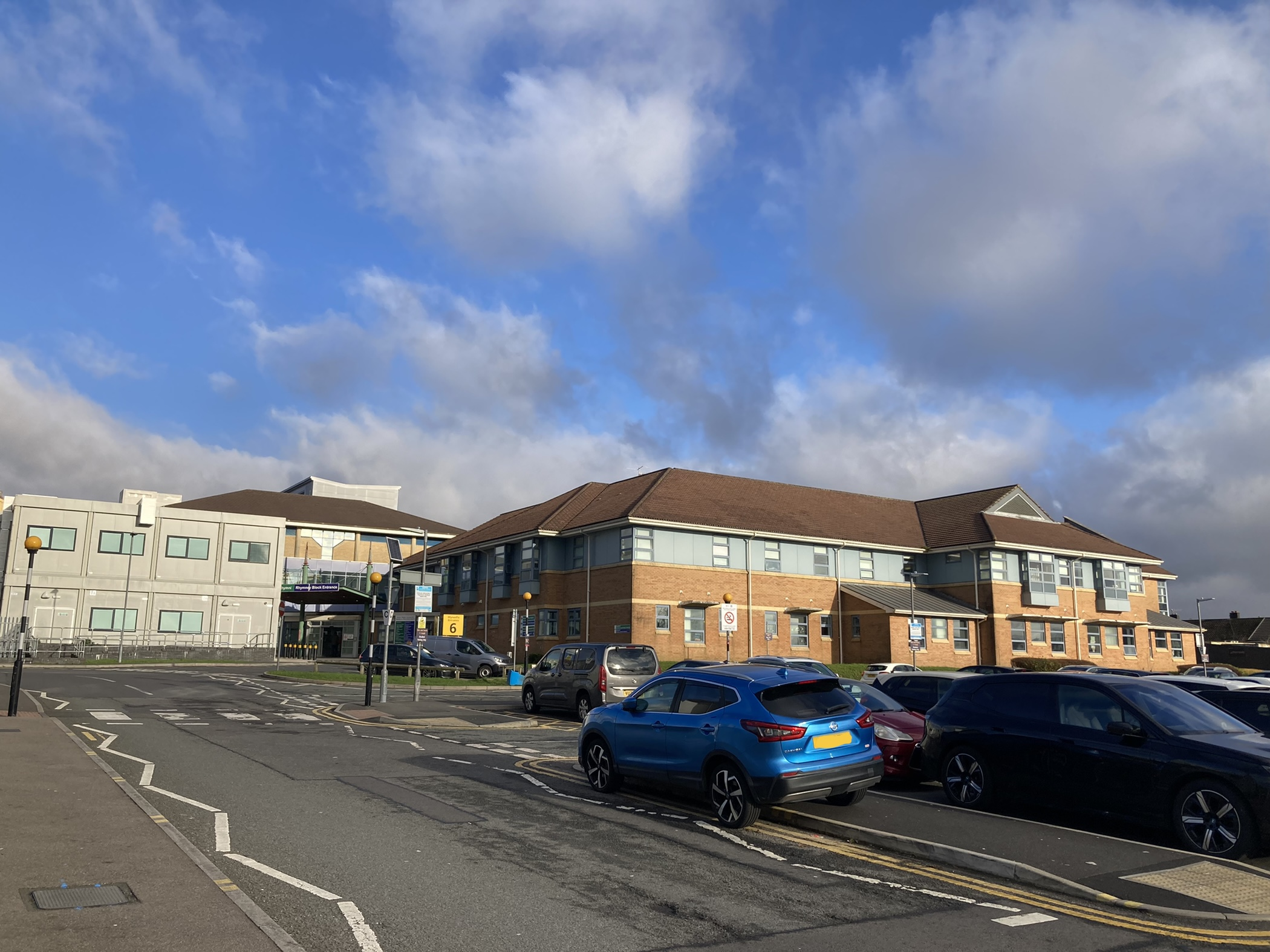
- Rear of Prince Charles Hospital in 2024

- Shown in Merthyr Tydfil

Geography
- Location: Gurnos, Merthyr Tydfil, Wales, United Kingdom
- Coordinates: 51.7641°N 3.3849°W

Organisation
- Care system: NHS Wales
- Type: General

Services
- Emergency department: Yes

History
- Founded: 1978

Links
- Website: cwmtafmorgannwg.wales/visiting/prince-charles-hospital/

Prince Charles Hospital (Welsh: Ysbyty'r Tywysog Siarl) is a district general hospital in Gurnos, Merthyr Tydfil, Wales. It is managed by the Cwm Taf Morgannwg University Health Board.

== History ==
Construction of the first phase of the new hospital began in 1972 and it was officially opened in 1978. Services were transferred from Merthyr General Hospital in 1986, and once a second phase of the Prince Charles Hospital had been completed in 1991, services also transferred from Buckland Hospital.

A new Emergency Care Centre opened in 2012 and the complete refurbishment of the whole hospital was approved by the Welsh Government in October 2013.

As part of a £6m revamp, a new state-of-the-art maternity unit was unveiled at the hospital in 2019.

A hospital helipad was installed in 2017 at the cost of £700,000 and intended to be used for emergency night-time takeoffs and landings by rescue helicopters. In 2019 it had yet to be used because of a lack of adequate fencing and lights, which has raised safety concerns.

The hospital's maternity services were put into special measures in 2019 after concerns were raised about the treatment of mothers and their babies. There were also concerns about the standard of care affording to a cancer patient who died in the hospital.
