= Talbot Green =

Coordinates: 51.5372°N 3.3847°W

Talbot Green: Welsh: Tonysguboriau
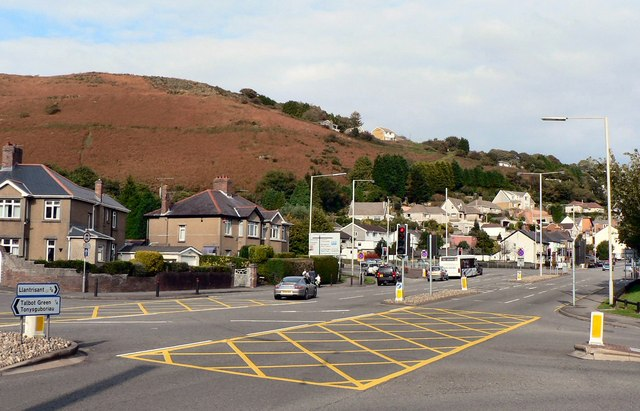

- Location within Rhondda Cynon Taf
- Population: 2,734 (2011 Ward)
- OS grid reference: ST040829
- Principal area: Rhondda Cynon Taf
- Preserved county: Mid Glamorgan
- Country: Wales
- Sovereign state: United Kingdom
- Post town: PONTYCLUN
- Postcode district: CF72
- Dialling code: 01443
- Police: South Wales
- Fire: South Wales
- Ambulance: Welsh

Talbot Green (Welsh: Tonysguboriau "lea of the barns") is a town (and electoral ward) just north of the M4 motorway, in the County Borough of Rhondda Cynon Taf, Wales in the United Kingdom. The town is part of Llantrisant Community Council.

== Geography ==
Talbot Green is located at the mouth of the short and mountainous Ely Valley, between Mynydd Garthmaelwg (Llantrisant forest) and Y Graig (Llantrisant). The River Ely runs through along the town boundary before continuing to Pontyclun. The town is bordered by the hill town of Llantrisant to the east, the town of Pontyclun to the south and the village of Llanharan a few miles to the west.

== Transport ==
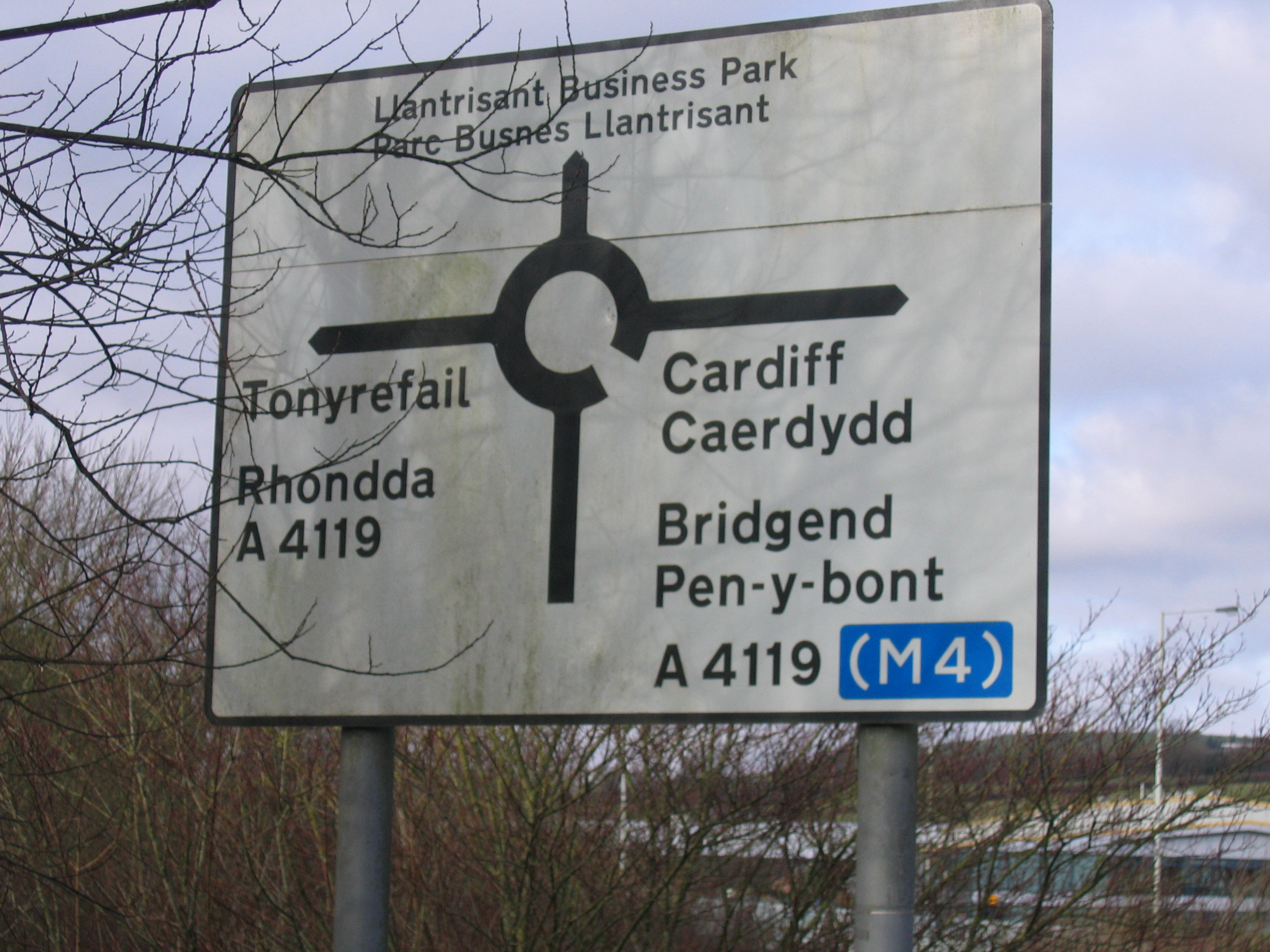
Sign showing the transport links in the area

The area has links to the rest of Wales with the A4119 linking it in the south to the M4 Motorway, and to the north to the South Wales Valleys. The Talbot Green by-pass opened in 1991 to relieve traffic in the town through disabling access to or from Pontyclun via Cowbridge Road, and provided a shorter route for the A473 Bridgend to Pontypridd Road. In September 2010, a £90m by-pass linking Talbot Green to Pontypridd was opened. The by-pass is notable for its three dormouse bridges, built to protect the endangered animals.

A single track railway runs north from Pontyclun railway station (which is the town's nearest railway station), turning west at Talbot Green to run roughly parallel to the Afon Clun, alongside the north of the A473, and originally ran to the Cwm Coking Works at Tynant, Beddau. All the original railway infrastructure remains intact between Talbot Green and Pontyclun, including the track, signals and bridges. The track is still embedded in the road where it crosses the A473, the warning lights remain at the roadside and the roadsigns warn drivers to stop if they see warning lights flash at the level crossing. A recent consultative study (Sewta Rail Strategy Study—January 2006) has considered the possibility of reopening the Pontyclun to Beddau branch line, as a passenger line rather than just for freight. This would require new stations at Talbot Green, Llantrisant, Gwaun Meisgyn and Beddau (Tynant).

== Facilities ==
The town has a golf club, and industrial estates including Coedcae Lane and Lanelay Industrial Estate.

The town has a development of offices, hotel and pub. A private health facility is located in Magden Park on the Ely Meadows alongside the A4119 Talbot Green to Ynysmeardy dual carriageway near the Royal Glamorgan Hospital. It has the Avionics department of British Airways, and is also the headquarters of the Welsh Blood Service.

Talbot Green's most significant building is Lanelay Hall, until recently the headquarters of the South Wales Fire and Rescue Service, who moved just over two miles away, to the former Buy As You View head office at Forest View Business Park, Ynysmaerdy, Llantrisant, in February 2009.

Talbot Green has two large retail parks, Glamorgan Vale retail park and Talbot Green shopping park. Glamorgan Vale retail park was opened circa 1996 and an extra unit was built in 2004 around the same time as the expansion of Talbot Green shopping park. It is located on the A473 Talbot Green bypass. It has 10 shopping units and one fast food/drive thru restaurant. Talbot Green shopping park was opened circa 1996, initially with three units, then later increased in size.

== Governance ==
Talbot Green was an electoral ward to Rhondda Cynon Taf County Borough Council, bounded to the east by the A4119 road. It elected one county borough councillor. Between 1999 and 2017 representation was by Independent councillors but at the May 2017 election the seat was taken by Labour's Stephen Powell.

A 2018 review of electoral arrangements by the Local Democracy and Boundary Commission for Wales would see Talbot Green merged with the neighbouring Llantrisant Town ward to become 'Llantrisant and Talbot Green'. The proposals would take effect from the 2022 council elections.

Talbot Green is also a community ward for Llantrisant Community Council, electing three community councillors.

== Future developments ==
Improvements to the road network, in particular the A4119 linking the Rhondda Valleys to the M4, through Tonyrefail and Talbot Green, brought development pressure to the area around Llantrisant. Extensive housing development has taken place recently in the towns along the A473, the main Pontypridd to Bridgend road—linking Llantwit Fardre to Llantrisant, Talbot Green, Llanharan and Pencoed—the road that runs parallel to the Afon Clun from Rhiwsaeson to Pontyclun.

== New Town centre scheme ==
In June 2011, it was announced that there were proposals to make Talbot Green a "new town centre" by building a new supermarket, 40 shops, a multi-screen cinema, cafes, restaurants, bars and a hotel. There will also be offices for local businesses, a range of civic and community facilities, apartments and houses. They are to be located on the former sites of Staedtler and Purolite and the surrounding brownfield land. The new scheme will include a new Leekes store to replace the existing one on the same site. The scheme is expected to create up to 1,900 jobs in the area. The scheme as of March 2013 had been given the green light by the local council, but development would not begin until the planning consent for the supermarket and a petrol filling station was granted. In May 2014 the new Sainsbury's supermarket was given the green light to anchor the new town centre scheme, with infrastructure works scheduled to begin in the autumn of 2014 and the development of the rest of the scheme will take place in due course. Work on the scheme officially began in February 2015.
