= Ruthin Union Workhouse =

Workhouse in Denbighshire, Wales

The Ruthin Union Workhouse
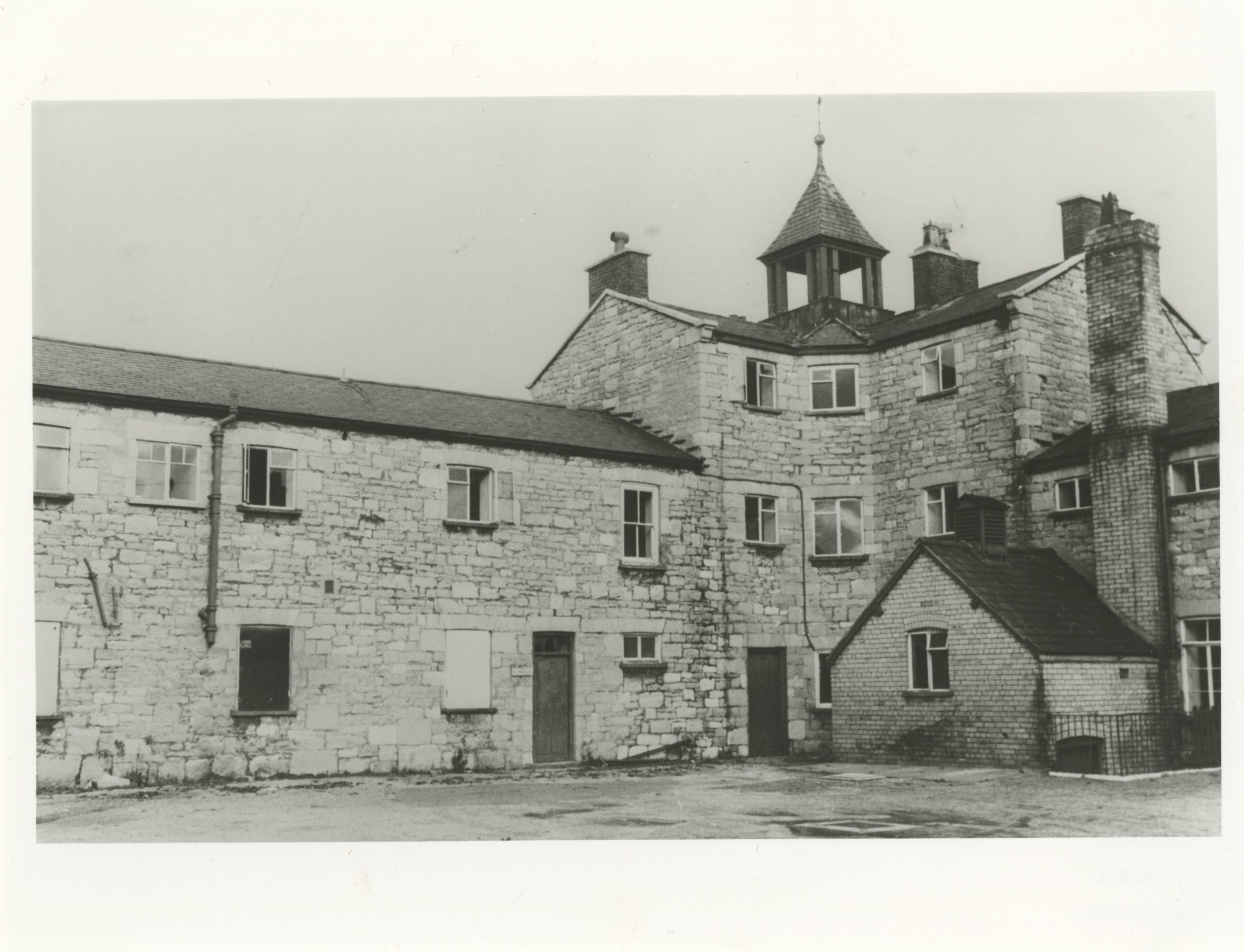
- Ruthin Workhouse, Ruthin; c. 1965
- Interactive map of the The Ruthin Union Workhouse area

General information
- Location: Ruthin, Denbighshire, Wales
- Coordinates: 53.113182°N 3.303207°W
- Construction started: 1837
- Completed: 4 February 1837

Technical details
- Structural system: stone, wood and brick

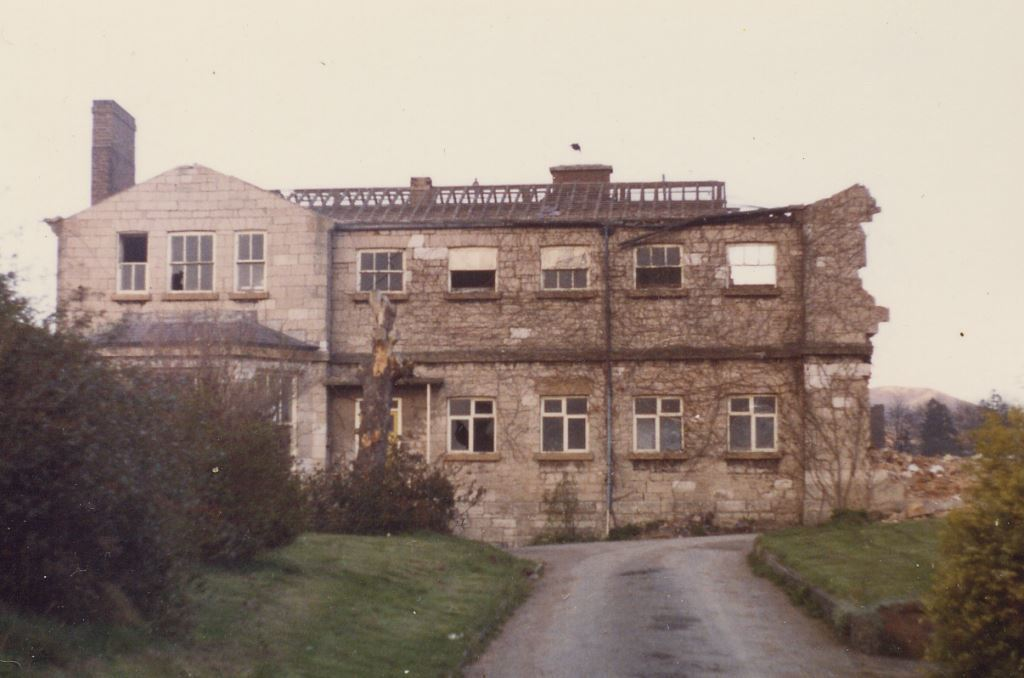
1960s demolition

Ruthin Union Workhouse was a workhouse on Llanrhydd Street, Ruthin, North Wales.

== History ==
It cost £6,050 at the time and was opened on 4 February 1837. The work house was upgraded in 1910, on a "square" layout with separate accommodation wings for male or female, infirm or able-bodied etc. The building radiated from a central hub. The Ruthin Union workhouse was demolished in the 1960s: some parts were incorporated into the Ruthin Community Hospital.
