= Welsh Liberal Democrats inaugural Assembly group election =

1998 Welsh Liberal Democrats election

Inaugural Welsh Liberal Democrats Assembly group election
- 20 November 1998
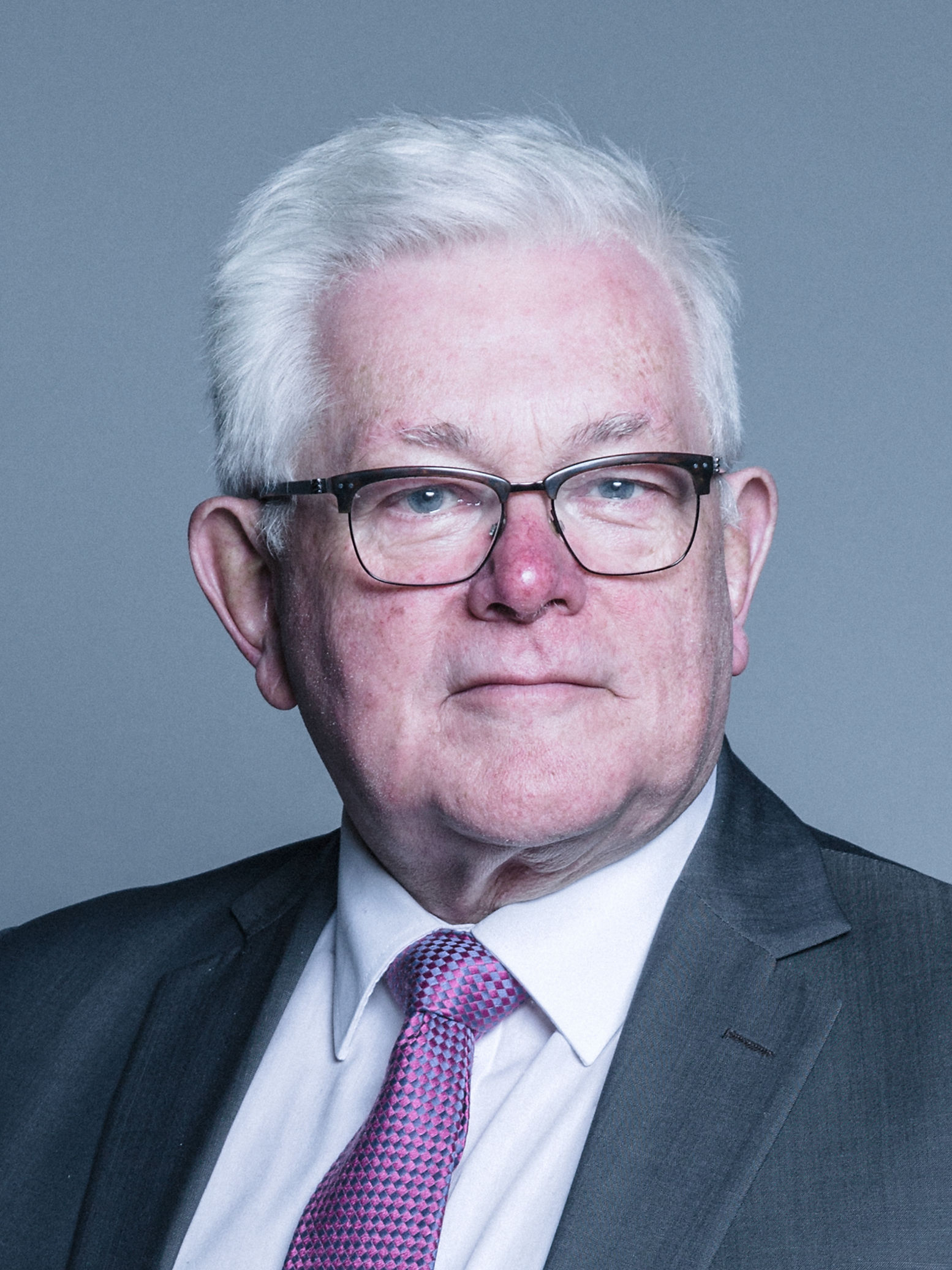

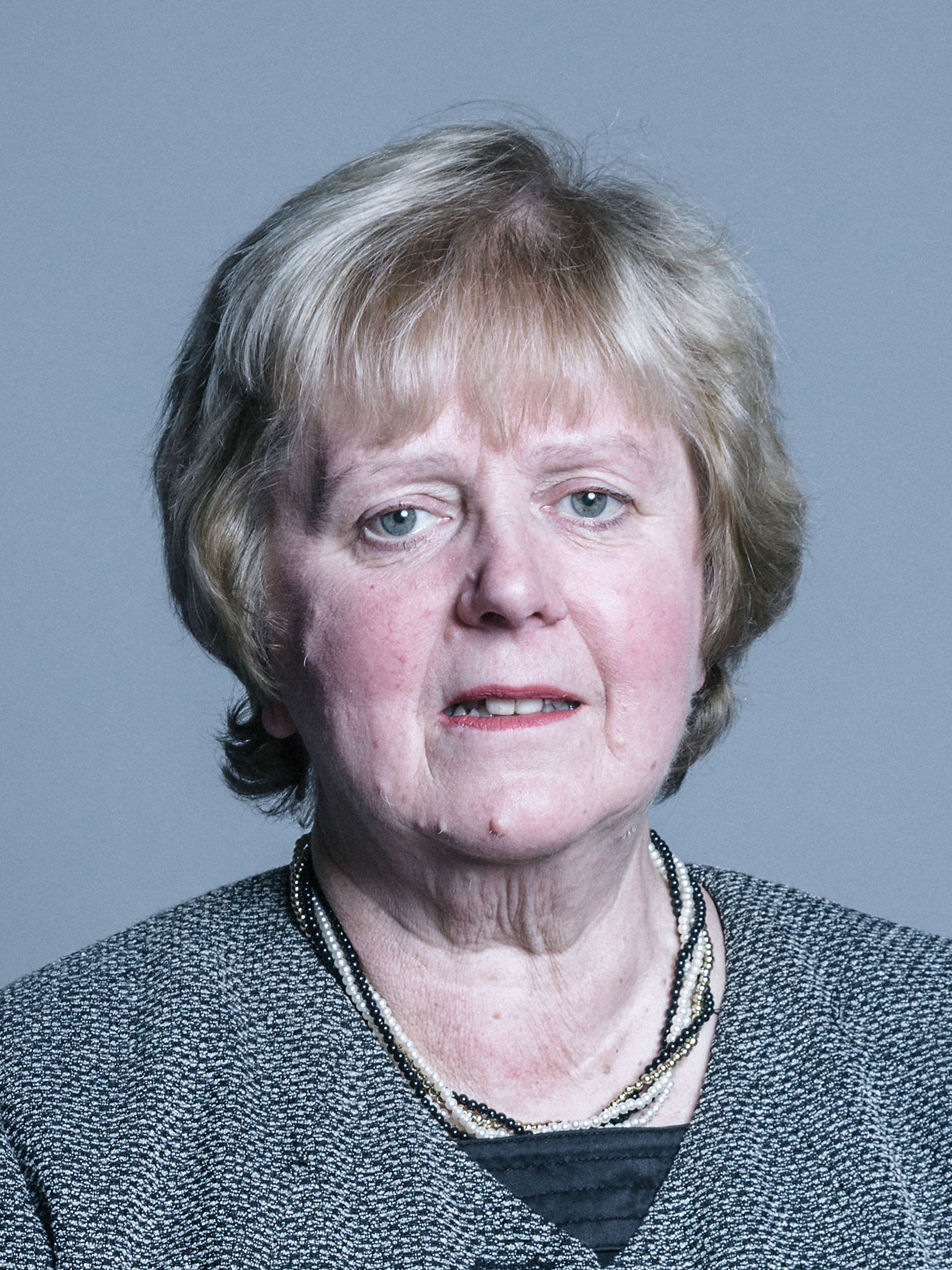
Candidate	Mike German	Christine Humphreys
Popular vote	1,037	883
Percentage	59.8%	40.2%
Leader before election
Position Created
Leader after election
Mike German

Ahead of the inaugural election to the Welsh Assembly in May 1999, the Welsh Liberal Democrats held a contest to elect their campaign leader and prospective group leader. The Welsh Liberal Democrat leader during this campaign was Brecon and Radnorshire MP Richard Livsey, who would remain as party leader until 2001.

== Candidates ==
Two candidates stood - South Wales-based Michael (Mike) German, a music teacher and former Cardiff Councillor, and North Wales-based Christine Humphreys, a former Colwyn Borough Councillor.

== Result ==
The result was declared on 20 November 1998:

Candidate	Votes	%	
Turnout: 40%
Mike German ✓	1,037		59.8
Christine Humphreys	883		40.2
Total	1,920	~40%	—N/a

Mike German was declared the winner and went onto to lead the Welsh Liberal Democrat Campaign. He later described himself as a '[group] leader in waiting'.

After the result, the Western Mail commented that:

"...as the contest developed it became clear that Ms Humphreys was succeeding in winning the votes of women, Welsh speakers and large proportions of the members who live outside the industrial south."

— Western Mail, Tuesday 1 December 1998

German went on to lead the Welsh Liberal Democrat campaign during the 1999 elections to the Welsh Assembly, where he was elected in South Wales East as one of the six seats won by the Welsh Liberal Democrats, and was then formally made Welsh Liberal Democrat Group Leader. German would go on to take his party into government in 2000 and serve as Deputy First Minister of Wales under Rhodri Morgan. Christine Humphreys entered the assembly as a member for North Wales.

German would continue to lead his group into the 2003 and 2007 elections, where the Welsh Liberal Democrats would return the same six seats as they had in 1999.

In 2007, German became overall party leader, taking over from Lembit Öpik. He stood down from both roles in 2008 and was succeeded by Kirsty Williams
