= 2008 Welsh Liberal Democrats leadership election =

- 11 October – 8 December 2008
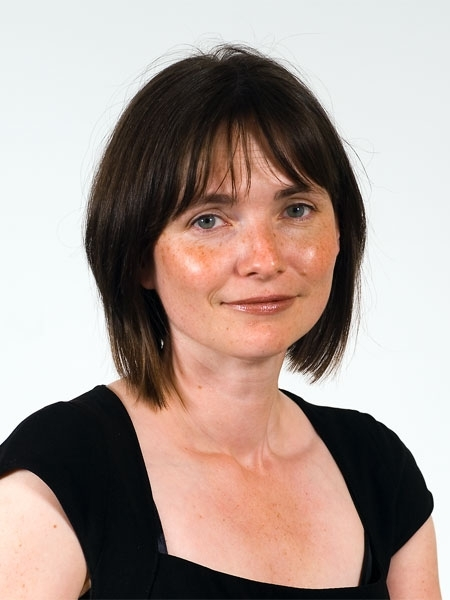

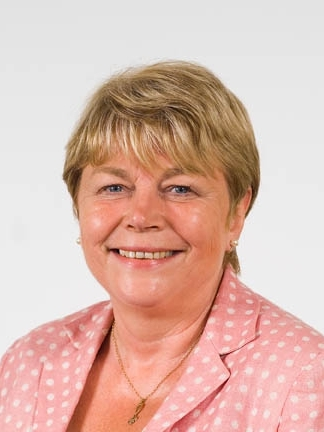
Candidate	Kirsty Williams	Jenny Randerson
Popular vote	910	612
Percentage	59.8%	40.2%
Leader before election
Mike German
Leader after election
Kirsty Williams

The 2008 Welsh Liberal Democrats leadership election took place in the autumn of 2008 following the resignation of Mike German. Two Assembly Members contested the leadership Jenny Randerson and Kirsty Williams.

Kirsty Williams won the contest with 59.8% of the vote and was declared leader on 8 December 2008, who became the first female party leader in Wales.

== Election rules ==
The Welsh Liberal Democrats had reviewed their leadership rules during their 2007 Autumn Conference in Aberystwyth and during their 2008 Autumn Conference in Clydach.

To stand for leader candidates needed to be an elected member of The National Assembly for Wales and have the support of 10% of AMs (i.e. one other colleague).

== Timeline ==
Mike German became party leader in 2007 (having served as Assembly group leader since 1999) and indicated that he would stand down in 2008. Kirsty Williams announced in summer of 2008 that she would run, formally launching her campaign on 10 September. Mike German formally announced his resignation during the Welsh Liberal Democrats Autumn Conference in Clydach on 11 October 2008 and Jenny Randerson formally announced her candidature that afternoon and launched her campaign in early November.

The winner was announced at an event in the Wales Millennium Centre on 8 December 2008.

== Candidates ==
=== Declined ===
- Peter Black
- Mick Bates
- Eleanor Burnham

=== Declared ===
Candidate	Born	Seat	AM Endorsements	Other Endorsements
Kirsty Williams	19 March 1971 (age 37)	AM for Brecon and Radnorshire	2 / 6 • Mick Bates; Peter Black	Roger Williams MP, Mark Williams MP
Jenny Randerson	26 May 1948 (age 60)	AM for Cardiff Central	1 / 6 • Eleanor Burnham	Lembit Öpik MP, Jenny Willott MP, Cllr Rodney Berman, Cllr Aled Roberts Simon Hughes MP

== Result ==
Candidate	Votes	%	
Turnout: 68.1%
Kirsty Williams ✓	910		59.8
Jenny Randerson	612		40.2
Total	1,522	68.1%	—N/a

Williams went on to serve as leader for seven and a half years until her resignation following the 2016 elections to the Welsh Assembly.
