= 2007 Welsh Liberal Democrats leadership election =

- 13 October – 5 November 2007
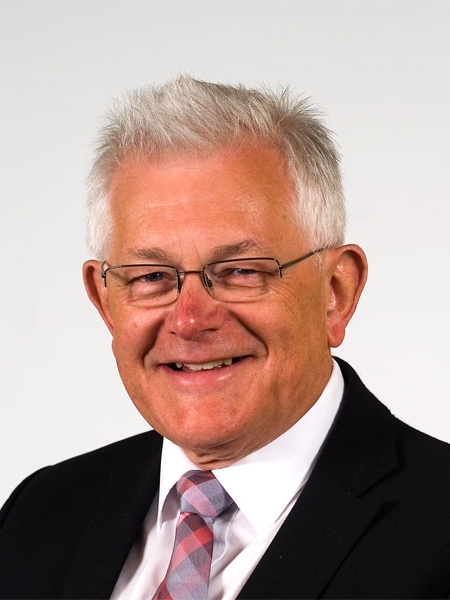
Candidate	Mike German
Popular vote	Unopposed
Leader before election
Lembit Öpik
Leader after election
Mike German

The 2007 Welsh Liberal Democrats leadership election took place following the resignation of Lembit Öpik at the 2007 Autumn Liberal Democrat Conference in Aberystwyth following his belief that the Welsh Liberal Democrat leader should be the group leader in the National Assembly.

At the close of nominations only one candidate - Assembly group leader since 1999 Mike German was nominated and he was duly returned unopposed.

German went on to serve as leader for a little over a year until his resignation the following year.
