= 2016 Welsh Liberal Democrats leadership election =

- 6–7 May 2016
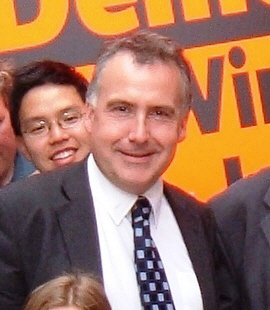
Candidate	Mark Williams
Popular vote	Unopposed
Leader before election
Kirsty Williams
Leader after election
Mark Williams

The 2016 Welsh Liberal Democrats leadership election took place following the resignation of Kirsty Williams following the 2016 elections to the Welsh Assembly where the Welsh Liberal Democrats fell from five seats to one.

Kirsty Williams resigned on 6 May 2016 with Mark Williams being appointed acting leader that evening before being confirmed as leader by the party's National Executive Committee the following day.

Williams went on to serve as leader for a little over a year until his resignation in June 2017.
