= Short term benefit advance =

Early welfare benefit payment in the UK

A short term benefit advance is a feature of the British social security system whereby a claimant can get an advance of certain benefit payments in the form of a loan which they have to pay back. Short term benefit advances are designed to support those who are in financial need.

== See also ==
- Hardship payments in the United Kingdom
