= Mike German, Baron German =

Former Deputy First Minister of Wales

The Right Honourable The Lord German OBE
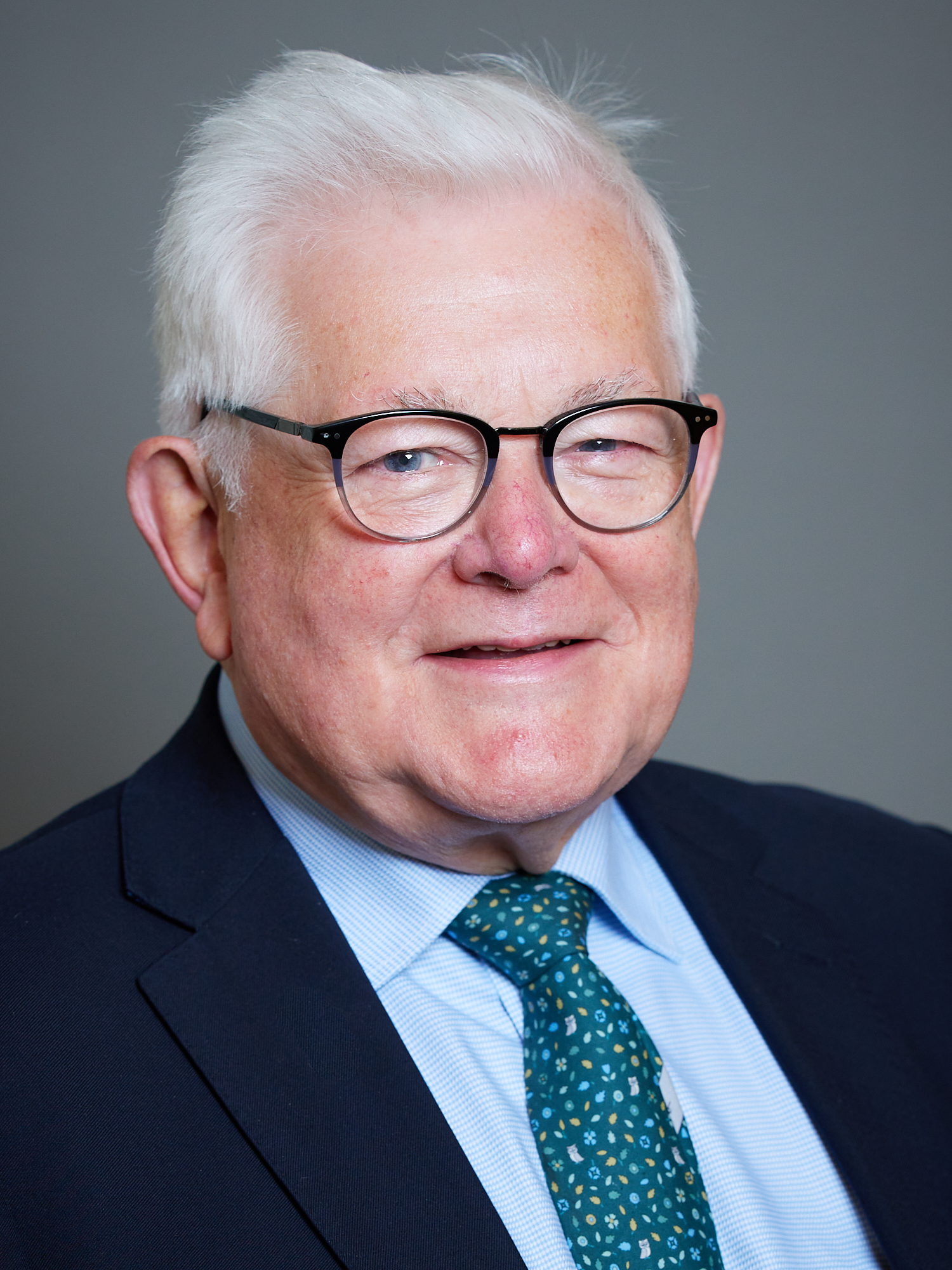
- Official portrait, 2022

Deputy First Minister of Wales (Note: From July 2001 to June 2002, German stood down as Deputy First Minister for the duration of a police investigation into his expenses during his time at the Welsh Joint Education Committee. He appointed Jenny Randerson to serve as the acting deputy first minister in his absence.)
- In office 13 June 2002 – 8 May 2003
- First Minister: Rhodri Morgan
- Preceded by: Jenny Randerson (acting)
- Succeeded by: Ieuan Wyn Jones (2007) (Note: Office vacant from 2003 to 2007.)
- In office 16 October 2000 – 6 July 2001
- First Minister: Rhodri Morgan
- Preceded by: Office established
- Succeeded by: Jenny Randerson (acting)

Leader of the Welsh Liberal Democrats
- In office 13 October 2007 – 8 December 2008
- Federal party leader: Ming Campbell; Vince Cable; Nick Clegg
- Preceded by: Lembit Öpik
- Succeeded by: Kirsty Williams

Leader of the Welsh Liberal Democrats in the National Assembly
- In office 6 May 1999 – 8 December 2008
- Leader: Richard Livsey; Lembit Öpik; Himself
- Preceded by: Office Established
- Succeeded by: Kirsty Williams

Minister for Rural Affairs and Wales Abroad
- In office 13 June 2002 – 8 May 2003
- First Minister: Rhodri Morgan
- Preceded by: Carwyn Jones
- Succeeded by: Carwyn Jones

Minister for Economic Development
- In office 16 October 2000 – 6 July 2001
- First Minister: Rhodri Morgan
- Preceded by: Rhodri Morgan
- Succeeded by: Rhodri Morgan

Assembly Member for South Wales East
- In office 6 May 1999 – 30 June 2010
- Preceded by: Assembly established
- Succeeded by: Veronica German

Member of the House of Lords
- Lord Temporal
- Life peerage 24 June 2010

Leader of Cardiff City Council
- In office 8 May 1987 – 2 May 1991 Co-leading with Alun Michael
- Preceded by: Ron Watkiss
- Succeeded by: John Phillips

Personal details
- Born: Michael James German; 8 May 1945 (age 81) Cardiff, Wales
- Party: Liberal Democrats (since 1988); Liberal (before 1988)
- Other political affiliations: SDP–Liberal Alliance (1981–1988)
- Spouse(s): Georgette (divorced) Veronica (m. 2006)
- Children: 2
- Education: St Mary's College London; Open University; University of the West of England
- Website: Archived website

Michael James German, Baron German OBE (born 8 May 1945) is a Welsh politician who was Deputy First Minister of Wales from 2000 to 2001 and 2002 to 2003 and Leader of the Welsh Liberal Democrats in the National Assembly from 1999 to 2008 and overall Welsh Party leader between 2007 and 2008. The first-ever deputy first minister of Wales, he was also Minister for Economic Development from 2000 to 2001 and Minister for Rural Affairs and Wales Abroad from 2002 to 2003. He was elected to the National Assembly for Wales in 1999 where he was Assembly Member (AM) for South Wales East until 2010 and led his party group until 2008. In 2010, he was granted a life peerage and has since served in the House of Lords as a working peer for the Liberal Democrats. Ideologically, he is on the more liberal wing of his party.

German was born Michael James German in Cardiff, Wales. He studied at St Mary's College London, the Open University and the University of the West of England before working in a career of teaching until 1990. He joined the Liberal Party in the 1970s and was elected as the SDP–Liberal Alliance's candidate for the ward of Cathays at the 1983 Cardiff City Council election. In the council, he led the Alliance and its successor party the Liberal Democrats until 1995. He served as the co-leader of the council alongside Alun Michael of the Labour Party from 1987 to 1992 for the duration of a coalition between their parties and the Conservative Party. He also stood as his party's prospective parliamentary candidate for Cardiff North at the October 1974 general election and the 1979 general election, and for Cardiff Central at the 1983 general election and 1987 general election, failing to win on each occasion. From 1990 to 1999, he was also the head of the Welsh Joint Education Committee's (WJECs) unit in Europe. He was awarded an OBE in 1996 for public and political service.

In the 1997 Welsh devolution referendum, German led his party's campaign to support the creation of a devolved assembly for Wales, also becoming one of the leading campaigners for the successful cross-party Yes campaign. In 1998, he defeated Christine Humphreys in a leadership contest to become the leader of the Welsh Liberal Democrat Group in the National Assembly for Wales. At the first assembly election in 1999, German was elected as AM for South Wales East; he was re-elected at the 2003 assembly election and 2007 assembly election. He later won another leadership contest in 2007 to become the official party leader of the Welsh Liberal Democrats, succeeding Öpik, before stepping down as leader a year later in 2008.

In the National Assembly, German led the Welsh Liberal Democrats in opposition from 1999 to 2000 and again from 2003 to 2008. In 2000, he negotiated and formed a coalition government with Labour's Rhodri Morgan and became Deputy First Minister and Minister for Economic Development. He stood down from the government in 2001 for the duration of a police investigation into allegations of financial misconduct during his time at the WJEC. He was cleared of wrongdoing in 2002 and returned to the government as the deputy first minister and the minister for rural affairs and Wales abroad. Labour ended its coalition with German's party after it made gains at the 2003 assembly election. Following the hung result of the 2007 assembly election, German tried to negotiate a coalition with Plaid Cymru and the Conservatives which failed to receive the endorsement of his own party, with Plaid choosing to form a coalition with Labour as a result. He remained in the assembly until 2010.

In 2010, German left the assembly after he was granted a life peerage in Gordon Brown's 2010 Dissolution Honours list. He has since been a member of the House of Lords as a working peer for the Liberal Democrats, where he has called for its abolition and replacement with an elected lower chamber. He was an opponent of the Rwanda asylum plan of Boris Johnson, Liz Truss and Rishi Sunak's Conservative governments and in 2024 led an unsuccessful attempt by Liberal Democrat peers to block the government's Safety of Rwanda (Asylum and Immigration) Bill, which would overturn a court ruling that declared Rwanda an unsafe country for refugees and asylum seekers. He was a member of the Secondary Legislation Scrutiny Committee from 2020 to 2023 and has also chaired the Parliament Choir.

== Early life and career ==
Michael James German was born on 8 May 1945 in Cardiff, Wales. He was educated at St Illtyd's College before going on to study at St Mary's College London and the Open University, where he gained a degree in educational studies, and the University of the West of England, where he gained a post graduate qualification in education management. Prior to his career in politics, German worked as a music teacher and became the head of music at two schools in Cardiff. In an interview with the South Wales Argus in 2019, he said he started participating in student activism during this period, claiming to have been elected as chair of his local branch of the Teacher's Association. In 1986, he was teaching at Lady Mary High School in Cardiff, where he later finished his teaching career as head of music. German retired from teaching in 1990 to serve as the European director at the Welsh Joint Education Committee, where he led its unit in Europe before leaving the organisation in May 1999. In this role, he was responsible for managing student exchange programmes between Wales and other countries in Europe.

=== Early political career ===
German joined the Liberal Party in the 1970s. In an interview from 2019, he said he did so because he supported its goals of "social justice and fairness". In 1974, he stood as its prospective parliamentary candidate for Cardiff North in the October 1974 general election. He came third with 17.8% of the vote, behind Labour's J. Collins who won 35.7% of the vote and the Conservatives' Ian Grist who won 42.9% of the vote. He stood again at the 1979 general election, winning 13.5% behind Labour's M. D. Petrou with 36.2% and Grist with 47.3%. At the 1983 general election, he stood as the SDP–Liberal Alliance's Liberal candidate for Cardiff Central, where he came in second place behind Grist with 32.6% of the vote to Grist's 41.4%. He stood for the constituency again in the 1987 general election, falling to third place behind Labour's Jon Owen Jones with 29.3% of the vote to his 32.3%, with Grist again winning the seat with 37.1% of the vote. He was also the director of the Welsh Liberal Party's national campaign at the election, serving in the same position for the Welsh Liberal Democrats at the 1992 and 1997 general elections after the Liberals merged with the Social Democratic Party in 1988. Ideologically, German is on the more liberal wing of the Liberal Democrats.

== Cardiff City Council ==
In May 1983, German stood for election to Cardiff City Council as the Alliance's Liberal candidate for the ward of Cathays at the 1983 council election, a marginal ward with Labour. German campaigned on ending the council's practice of rubbish tipping, stating that it had damaged the environment, and on ending new green belt developments in areas on the outskirts of Cardiff like Pentwyn so that the council could focus more of its resources on regenerating deprived areas in the city centre. He was elected to the council with 1,742 votes, or 36.9% of the vote, alongside Alliance colleague Fred Hornblow and Labour's Derek Allinson. He was re-elected for a second term with Hornblow and Allinson at the 1987 council election with 1,992 votes, or 37.6% of the vote, and for a third term with them at the 1991 council election with 2,231 votes, or 41.7% of the vote. His wife Georgette German was also elected to the council in 1983 as a Liberal member for the ward of Plasnewydd.

After his election to the council in 1983, German became leader of the three-member Liberal group in the council, which later became a four-member Alliance group later in the 1983–1987 term. He continued to serve as group leader of the Alliance and its successor party the Liberal Democrats until he stepped down from the council in 1995. After the 1983 election, German criticised the Conservative administration of Ron Watkiss for giving each of the Liberals just one seat in the council's different committees, with German occupying a seat on the land committee and his colleagues Georgette German and Fred Hornblow occupying a seat on the personnel committee and the licensing committee each. He said the members of his group should have been given seats on committees with remits that covered specific issues in their wards of Cathays and Plasnewydd and accused the Conservatives of having "gagged" his party on those issues, claims Watkiss denied.

At the 1987 council election, German led the Alliance on a platform of making the council more transparent by introducing measures such as increasing the number of questions members of the public can ask councillors during public sessions of the council. German also criticised the Conservative administration's housing policy, claiming that it might cause a housing crisis in the city. Ahead of the election, he said he thought the Alliance would win enough seats to hold the balance of power in a hung council. This prediction proved correct, with the Alliance increasing its share of seats from 4 to 12, while the Conservatives won 24 seats and Labour won 29, a hung result which gave the Alliance the balance of power in the new council. Following the election, German became the co-leader of the council, with his group serving in a coalition with both Labour and the Conservatives until 1991. The other co-leader of the council during this period was Alun Michael of the Labour Party, who had negotiated the coalition as Labour's chief whip in the council.

German led his party, by now the Liberal Democrats, into the 1991 council election. This time, he expected his party to fall short of winning enough seats to form an administration. The campaign had a low profile, with all three governing parties making little criticism of their opponents because of their coalition in the council except for in some marginal areas. German's Liberal Democrats mainly campaigned on the delayed construction of a leisure centre in Maindy. The Liberal Democrats were expected to lose some seats to Labour in Plasnewydd, though German's wife Georgette German was considered safe because of her local popularity. A close fight was expected between the two parties in Cathays, though German was not considered to be at risk, having established himself as a known national figure in the Liberal Democrats by this time. At the election, the Liberal Democrats' total seat share fell from 11 to 9, though the party did retain its seats in Cathays. It however failed to win the seat of the ward's incumbent Labour councillor Derek Allinson, who fought off a close challenge from the party to keep it for Labour. These were seen as good results for the party, which was at risk of losing more of its seats to Labour and the Conservatives. Commenting on the election results, German said the Liberal Democrats had been able to consolidate their position in the council and was now a "force to be reckoned with". Labour regained control of the council following the election. This was the last election to the council and therefore the last contested by German and his party. Cardiff City Council was abolished in 1996 and replaced by Cardiff County Council in the same year. He did not stand for election to the new council and decided to instead shift his attention toward the national structure of the Welsh Liberal Democrats.

== National Assembly for Wales ==
=== 1997 devolution referendum and 1998 leadership election ===
In the 1990s, the Liberal Democrats campaigned with the Labour Party and Plaid Cymru for the establishment of a devolved assembly for Wales. A supporter of home rule for Wales, German led the Welsh Liberal Democrats' campaign for a Yes vote in the 1997 Welsh devolution referendum as its campaign director. During the campaign, the Liberal Democrats called for the UK Labour government to implement more radical plans for a devolved parliament with the power to raise taxes and a "strong Welsh voice in a devolved United Kingdom". German and his party nonetheless supported the proposed assembly as a "powerful first step" and called on Welsh voters to vote Yes. The party endorsed the cross-party Yes for Wales campaign and worked closely with Labour and Plaid in the campaign to win the referendum, with German becoming one of its leading figures. When the results came through in September 1997, the majority of the Welsh public narrowly voted in favour of establishing the devolved National Assembly for Wales, with 50.3% of the vote. After the election result, German and his party called for the assembly to include more women and ethnic minority politicians than traditionally seen in UK legislatures. German said that this could be done by giving the assembly an exemption from the Sex Discrimination Act 1975 to enable it to use all-women shortlists. He endorsed the system of proportional representation which was planned for the assembly as he thought it would ensure it would be "all inclusive".

The first election to the National Assembly for Wales was scheduled for May 1999. By August 1998, German had become the chief spokesperson of the Welsh Liberal Democrats. In the same month, he was selected by the party to contest the assembly constituency of Caerphilly against Ron Davies, the leader of Labour in Wales who represented the same area in Westminster and was also standing for the seat. He was also made the party's top candidate on the party list for the South Wales East assembly electoral region, whose members would be elected through party-list proportional representation as in other electoral regions of the assembly. On the issue of cooperating with Labour in the 1999 Welsh local elections, German as chief spokesperson said his party would discuss certain issues with Labour where the two parties found common-ground, but stated that his party "disagree almost entirely with the way Labour runs local government in Wales".

In October 1998, the party agreed to hold a leadership election to elect the leader of the Welsh Liberal Democrat Group in the National Assembly ahead of its establishment in 1999 after Labour, Plaid Cymru and the Conservatives had held their own leadership elections. The elected leader would also lead the party's election campaigns in Wales. German launched his leadership bid on 12 November and was challenged by fellow assembly candidate Christine Humphreys. The vote was scheduled for 28 November. German was considered the favourite in the election, though only by a narrow lead. On 28 November, he won the contest with 1,037 votes to Humphreys' 883 votes, a closer result than expected, and was elected leader of the Welsh Liberal Democrat Group, taking office once he was elected to the assembly in 1999. Although now its leader in a de facto capacity, German did not serve as the official party leader of the Welsh Liberal Democrats, which at the time was a separate post held by Brecon and Radnorshire MP Richard Livsey until 2001 and Montgomeryshire MP Lembit Öpik until 2007. Officially, German only led the party in the National Assembly for Wales until 2007, when he was formally elected as party leader. He served under federal party leaders Paddy Ashdown, Charles Kennedy and Ming Campbell as leader in the National Assembly and Ming Campbell, Vince Cable and Nick Clegg as leader of the Welsh Liberal Democrats.

=== 1999 assembly election ===
At the 1999 National Assembly for Wales election, German led the Liberal Democrats on a platform of promoting its official party values of equality, community and liberty, which it claimed would "direct Wales into the new millennium". German launched its election manifesto on 11 April, which included commitments to focus on education, health and improved governance as its main priorities. In the manifesto, the party also pledged to cut primary school class sizes to a maximum of 30 pupils, with the aim of eventually lowering this to 25 pupils, and to cut NHS waiting times to a maximum of six months for GP referrals and medical treatment. On devolution, the party called for the assembly to gain more powers and for it to establish ties with other legislatures in the Celtic countries. It also campaigned on its self-claimed status as the main party of devolution in Wales, having claimed to have campaigned for devolution for over 100 years if including the record of its predecessor the Liberal Party. German also pledged to introduce performance-related pay for members of the Welsh Cabinet, which would change depending on their performance on issues like NHS waiting times and their commitment to openness and the truth.

Although opinion polls had forecast the Liberal Democrats as winning only six seats to become the third-largest party in the assembly behind Plaid Cymru and the governing Labour Party, German publicly dismissed the polls and claimed that his party would likely become the second-largest party behind Labour, pointing to its performance in Welsh local government by-elections since the 1997 general election, where he claimed the party had won a total of over 100,000 votes to establish itself as the "clear second place [party] to Labour". Based on this performance, German said the party's main target was to win 15 out of the 60 seats in the assembly. He said it would focus its efforts on winning constituency seats in North Wales to meet this target, with its other seats projected to come from proportional representation regional lists.

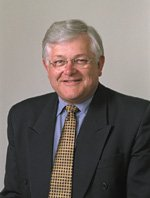
Official portrait in the National Assembly for Wales, c. 2000.

As predicted in opinion polls, the Liberal Democrats won six seats at the election, becoming the fourth-largest party behind the Conservatives with 9 seats, Plaid Cymru with 17 seats and Labour with 28 seats. German failed to personally win the seat of Caerphilly, coming in third-place with 12.4% of the vote behind Plaid Cymru's Robert Gough who won 34.2% and Labour's Ron Davies who won 44.2%. He did however win a proportional representation top-up seat in the electoral region of South Wales East, being elected as an assembly member (AM) for the region alongside Phil Williams and Jocelyn Davies of Plaid Cymru and William Graham of the Conservative Party. He was re-elected with Graham and Davies at the 2003 assembly election, with Williams losing her seat to Conservative Laura Anne Jones. German, Davies and Graham were re-elected again at the 2007 assembly election, with Laura Anne Jones losing her seat to Plaid Cymru's Mohammad Asghar. In the first term of the assembly, German was a member of the Economic Development Committee and chaired the Legislation Committee.

Labour's performance at the 1999 assembly election meant it had fallen three seats short of securing an overall majority. As a result, its leader Alun Michael considered forming a coalition administration with German's Liberal Democrats to grant him a governing majority and guarantee his nomination as the first-ever first secretary of Wales on 12 May, which could now face a potential challenge by the main opposition party Plaid Cymru. Michael and German had already led their parties into a coalition on Cardiff City Council some years earlier and had remained on good terms since then. UK Labour leader Tony Blair also backed a coalition with the Liberal Democrats. German, keen to form a coalition with Labour, offered to enter into coalition negotiations with Michael pending the approval of his own party, and said that he would accept a coalition on the condition that Labour agreed to a written power sharing agreement, cutting primary school class sizes to under 30 pupils and cutting healthcare waiting times to under six months.

At first, Michael also seemed keen to discuss a coalition with German and his party. However, the other Labour members in the assembly did not accept a coalition. Michael did discuss how the assembly could move forward with German and other party leaders given Labour's minority, but refused to negotiate a coalition with him. On 11 May, he publicly ruled out a coalition and announced his plan to form a minority administration. Michael said he did not form a coalition because it "would have been inclusive of one party and exclusive of the others" when the new assembly had to, in his view, foster trust and cooperation between all the different parties. It is also believed that Michael concluded that the three other parties in the assembly would not be able to find enough common-ground to vote against Labour and form an alternative programme for government. German and the Liberal Democrats disapproved of Michael's decision and argued that a minority administration would not provide the stability required of a devolved government for Wales. The party also signalled that it would abstain during the nomination of the first secretary on 12 May. Plaid Cymru welcomed Michael's decision, believing that a minority administration would give them greater influence, and announced that it would not oppose Michael's nomination as first secretary on 12 May.

=== First term in opposition ===
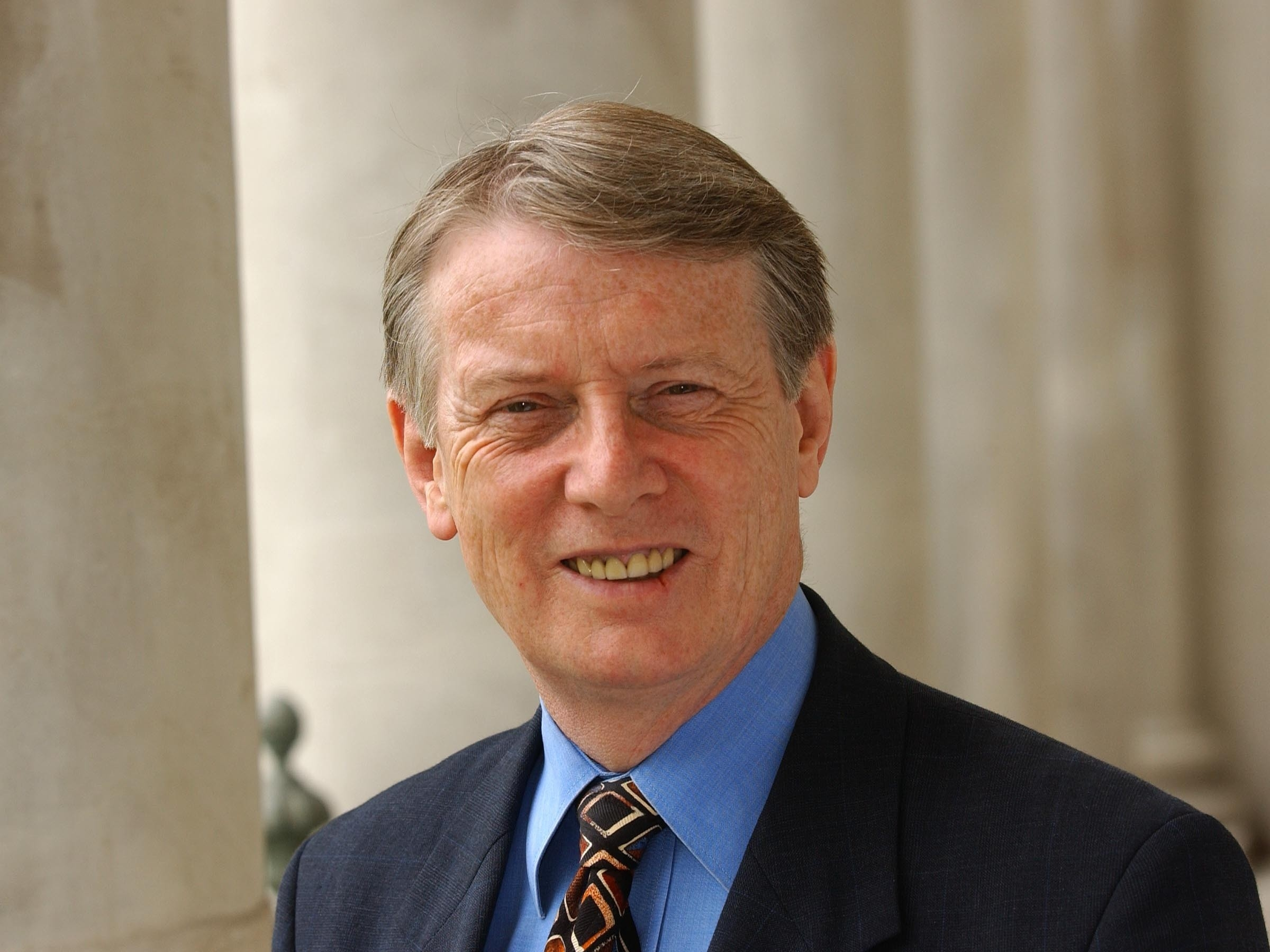
First Secretary Alun Michael named two education secretaries to his cabinet, a decision which German criticised as "ridiculous".

On 12 May, the National Assembly for Wales sat for the first time. At its first plenary session, Alun Michael was nominated unopposed as the first secretary of Wales to form a minority administration. He announced his cabinet later that day, during the same session. His cabinet notably included the appointment of two education secretaries; Tom Middlehurst was made the assembly secretary for education and training with responsibility for post-16 education while Rosemary Butler was made the assembly secretary for education and childcare with responsibility for education up to the age of 16. German criticised Michael's decision to split these responsibilities between two different ministerial posts as "ridiculous" and said "we should be looking to [instead] provide education and training from cradle to work to retirement". German formed his first frontbench team of assembly party spokespeople the next day, appointing himself as the Welsh Liberal Democrat Group's spokesperson for economic development and European affairs in addition to his role as group leader. Despite his prior criticism, German also appointed two education spokespeople, Jenny Randerson for pre-16 education and Christine Humphreys for post-16 education, to his frontbench.

Although Labour had denied it of a coalition, German pledged that his party would "play a positive role" in the new assembly, adding that the people of Wales had shown their desire for "politicians [to work] together" at the assembly election. In the first few months of the new institution, he voiced his disapproval for what he described as the "trivia", "personal scandal" and "petty squabbles" which had occurred in its early months. (Note: The period shortly after the National Assembly for Wales' establishment in May 1999 has been noted for its instability and policy inactivity. A walkout by opposition parties excluding the Liberal Democrats was staged in June 1999 after Labour AM Lynne Neagle criticised their policies on the European Union. In August 1999, the confrontational Conservative leader Rod Richards resigned and was succeeded by Nick Bourne, whom he had unsuccessfully tried to prevent from succeeding him, after he had been charged of causing grievous bodily harm, which he was later cleared of in 2000. A minor controversy also occurred when First Secretary Alun Michael named his cabinet in May 1999, when it emerged that his agriculture secretary Christine Gwyther was a vegetarian and the secretary responsible for the Welsh language Tom Middlehurst could not speak Welsh.) He supported the inclusion of a five-minute time limit for spoken contributions in the standing orders of the assembly and said he believed "you are not up to it if you can't make comments in five minutes". He supported Labour's Ron Davies after he came out as bisexual in June during the continuing controversy surrounding the details of his mugging at Clapham Common in 1998, and said it was a "matter for himself and nobody else [...] it is not a matter for us or any other party", though he did express his hope that this would mark an end to the controversy. In the same month, German's party was the only one that did not join an opposition party walkout from the assembly after Labour AM Lynne Neagle criticised opposition parties' policies on the European Union (EU) ahead of that month's election to the European Parliament. Conservative leader Rod Richards criticised the Liberal Democrats for failing to join the walkout, to which German said this was the first time a matter of controversy had arisen in the assembly, adding that he did not support walkouts from the assembly to deal with controversial matters.

The National Assembly for Wales legally assumed its devolved powers on 1 July 1999. At the plenary session of 13 July, German put forward a motion which proposed the creation of an enterprise development bank for Wales "to channel venture capital into particular community enterprises". The business secretary Andrew Davies backed the motion after an amendment to require consultation from academics, businesses, the voluntary sector and local authorities was agreed. The motion was carried and a devolved development bank called Finance Wales was established in 2001. Over time, German established himself as an expert on the standing orders of the assembly, as exemplified by his successful motion on 3 November 1999 to make the Economic Development Committee responsible for exploring the establishment of "community investment unit to channel European Structural Funding to community enterprises" which would be part of a development bank for Wales. However, the Liberal Democrats as a whole was set back by its status as the fourth largest party in the assembly, with German becoming its only prominent representative there.

On 14 July, German questioned Michael on the possibility of setting up a transport authority for Wales. This followed a Liberal Democrat consultation on rail transport in Wales in May, which according to German had returned passenger complaints on safety, train delays, discomfort in trains and expensive train fares; the party then called for the creation of a rail authority for Wales. Michael dismissed German's proposal for a transport authority and said his focus was instead on developing and introducing a transport policy for Wales. A devolved transport authority called Transport for Wales was later established in 2016.

==== Political crisis and resignation of Alun Michael ====
From mid-July to mid-September, the National Assembly for Wales went into summer recess. In August, German and Conservative leader Nick Bourne called for Alun Michael to reconvene the assembly earlier than the scheduled date of 14 September to address the ongoing farming crisis in the nation. German said the assembly had to take "urgent action [...] to meet the desperate concerns of tens of thousands of families whose very livelihoods are threatened. Michael dismissed these calls and the assembly reconvened as scheduled on 14 September. On the resumption of assembly business, German called for the agriculture secretary Christine Gwyther to provide an aid package for Welsh farmers to tackle the crisis and said that if she failed to do by the autumn "she should be censured by the assembly and forced to resign". However, he criticised threats from Plaid Cymru's leader Dafydd Wigley to table a motion of no confidence in Michael's administration if it failed to address the crisis, warning that "by throwing out Alun Michael the assembly would only plunge itself into crisis and wouldn't help a single farmer this autumn". Later that month, the assembly voted for a proposal by Gwyther to introduce a £750,000 calf processing scheme to address the crisis by awarding farmers with £20 for each calf that they processed. The scheme was dependent on permission from the European Commission, which initially said it would not block the scheme.

On 7 October, the European Commission vetoed the scheme and said it would only agree to a scheme which applied to the whole of Britain, leading to a political crisis in the assembly; it was found at a late stage in its implementation that a Wales-only scheme was illegal under EU regulations. On 7 October, German called for Gwyther to resign. A censure motion in Gwyther as the agriculture secretary was backed by all three opposition parties in the assembly and passed on 19 October. Michael refused to dismiss Gwyther following the motion as, he argued, it was him, not the assembly, who was responsible for appointing and dismissing ministers, and she received the backing of the rest of his cabinet to remain in post. In response to this and several other factors, Nick Bourne's Conservatives tabled a motion of no confidence in Michael as first secretary which, if passed, would require him to resign. Plaid Cymru and the Liberal Democrats did not back the motion and it was voted down on 2 November by Labour because of its lack of support. German said the motion acted as "a warning shot across the bows of this administration" and warned that his party would not abstain in a second confidence motion if Michael failed to meet his expectations and secure funding from the Treasury to meet the required match funding needed to receive promised EU Objective One funding for the deprived parts of Wales. As his party's spokesperson for economic development and European affairs, German developed a particular interest on the issue of Objective One, and the rest of the party in the assembly also treated the issue as a priority. As November progressed, German's Liberal Democrats started to work closer with the two other opposition parties in the assembly, the Conservatives and Plaid Cymru, on the issue of Objective One funding. On 3 November, the three parties published a joint-memorandum on the issue which was co-signed by German and the economic spokespeople from the two other parties, Plaid's Phil Williams and the Conservatives' Alun Cairns. This signalled increasing cooperation between the opposition parties on the Objective One issue, by this point the main issue in the assembly.

A deadlock formed in the assembly between Michael's minority administration and the opposition which could combine their numbers to block its policy programme. As the finalisation of the assembly's budget in February 2000 approached and it started to appear more likely that Michael's administration would fail to secure the Objective One funding, the opposition parties started to discuss the fate of Michael's administration and how to replace it with their own alternative administration in anticipation of another no confidence motion. German wrote a report to solve the deadlock in November, The National Assembly in deadlock: Is there a better way forward for Wales, which identified several major issues with the assembly, including the centralisation of power with the cabinet, a lack of a government programme, instability from the minority administration, a lack of consensus and direction, and a decline in power for the assembly committees. Its recommendations included a reform to the committee system of the assembly and introducing an independent body for the Presiding Officer to oversee the assembly's progress. This was positively received by Michael, who said he welcomed the proposals and hoped he could discuss them with German in future all-party discussions. Bourne agreed with the issues identified by German's report but disagreed with the reforms suggested in the paper. Plaid Cymru did not comment on the report. In December, German made another report which suggested the formation of a coalition administration to end the political deadlock, with a further prediction by German that such a coalition would be formed within two months. A similar proposal was drawn up by Labour AM Val Feld which entailed the formation of a government of national unity between all four parties in the assembly, but this was rejected by Michael's administration.

In January, Plaid Cymru made an ultimatum to Michael in which it warned that if he did not secure an additional £85 million in funding for 2000/2001 it would table another no confidence motion at the end of the budget debate on 8 February. On 1 February, Michael proposed setting up an all-party committee whose duties would include progressing the budget. Although German welcomed this proposal, the opposition's move toward a change in leadership for the assembly had already become too strong to prevent. On the same day, Michael called on Plaid Cymru to withdraw its threat of a motion of no confidence and said the UK Government would enable his administration to secure £1.2 billion in Objective One funding after its spending review in July. A further £25 million was promised for Objective One for 2000/2001, however this fell short of Plaid's demand for an additional £85 million. In response, Plaid went ahead with its plan for a no confidence motion. A no confidence motion was jointly tabled between Plaid's Ieuan Wyn Jones, German and the Conservatives' Nick Bourne for debate on 9 February. Ahead of the vote, German's party discussed negotiating a coalition or deal with Michael's administration, but it was ultimately decided that this was too unpopular a move for the party. German also believed that such a coalition would provide little advantages for the party in keeping Michael's challenged premiership afloat. Labour business secretary Andrew Davies had also met with German ahead of the motion, ostensibly as a representative of the majority of the Labour group, to receive assurance from him that the Liberal Democrats would not back Michael in the vote; Labour's AMs had agreed not to renominate Michael for first secretary if he lost the vote and had agreed to elect Morgan in his place. The motion of no confidence passed with the backing of all three opposition parties and Michael resigned. Labour's Rhodri Morgan was elected by the Labour administration to succeed him as first secretary.

==== Coalition negotiations with Rhodri Morgan ====
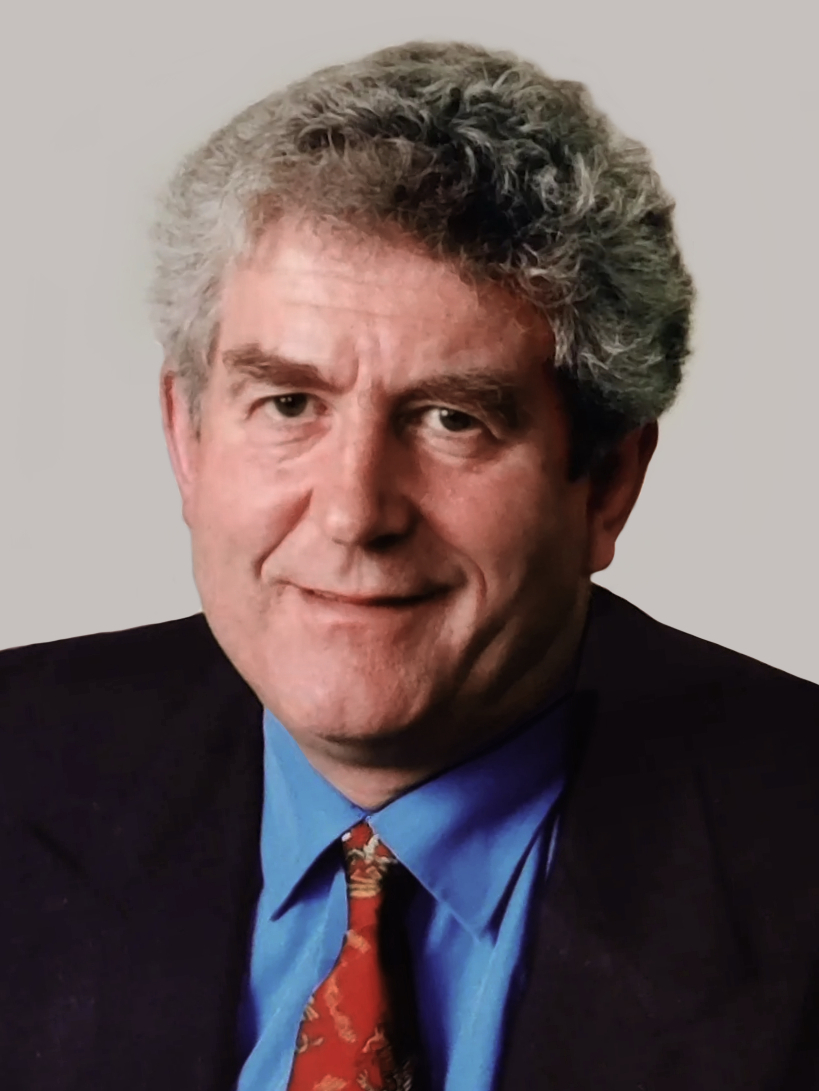
After the resignation of Alun Michael, German negotiated a new coalition government with his successor Rhodri Morgan

Following Rhodri Morgan's ascension to the role of first secretary, German said it was a "good day" for the National Assembly for Wales, but added that he was "not too keen that we should speak of new starts when we are still in the eyes of Wales on probation. We need to put politics into action where it really matters". He welcomed Morgan's suggestion that he would work on a cross-party basis on issues including Objective One funding. German called for a grand coalition between all four parties in the assembly to end the political deadlock between the opposition parties and the Labour minority administration.

In March 2000, former Welsh Liberal Democrat leader Alex Carlile called on German to form a coalition with Labour, in a similar manner to the coalition between the two parties in Scotland, and said that while he ideally agreed with a four-party coalition he believed it would probably end in failure. After becoming first secretary, Morgan said a coalition could be agreed as "a means to an end" to secure political stability in the assembly, and after reshuffling the cabinet in February he said further changes could be made to it to accommodate political agreements with other parties. During this period, German's party made preparations for a coalition, believing that such a deal may become necessary in the assembly as the year progressed. The party was initially however cautious toward fully committing to a coalition with Labour, which was unpopular in the Liberal Democrats' rural heartlands at the time.

From early August, German engaged in secret coalition negotiations with Morgan after his administration secured the required match funding from the UK Government for Objective One funding in July 2000. The negotiations were held to provide stability to the assembly and to stabilise Labour as the governing party following the unstable nature of the assembly over the last year and a half of its existence. On the Liberal Democrat side, the negotiations were independent from the UK party, which only offered advisers to help German during the negotiation process. Discussions were held over the summer recess of the assembly, with German and Morgan negotiating the assembly budget and several policy compromises.

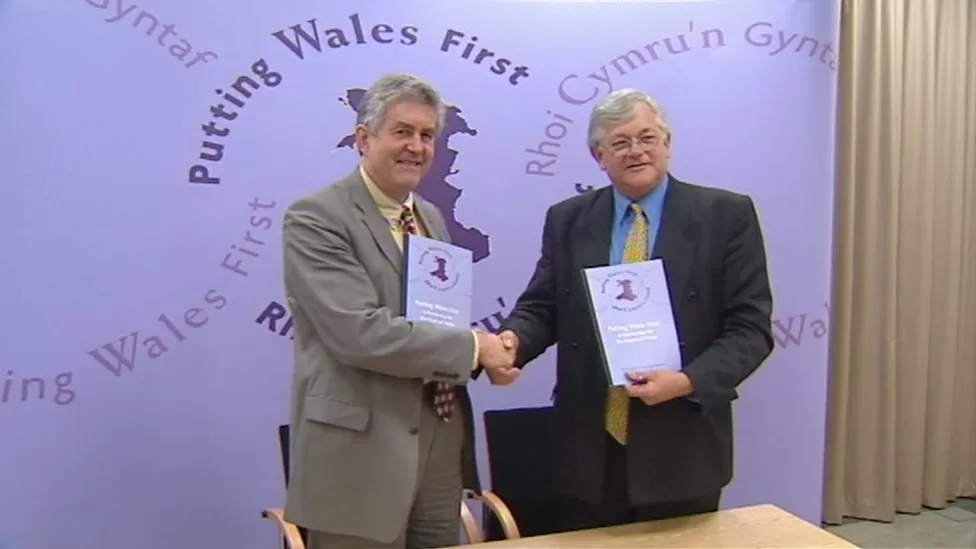
German and Morgan agree to the Putting Wales First coalition deal in October 2000

Putting Wales First, a coalition deal based on the coalition agreement between the Liberal Democrats and Labour in Scotland, was agreed to and announced on 5 October. Under the terms of the deal, it was agreed that German would become Morgan's deputy first secretary in the coalition, which was scheduled to last until the 2003 assembly election. Other ministerial portfolios were negotiated by German and Morgan on 15 October. Labour agreed to work with the Liberal Democrats to implement 114 of the latter's 1999 manifesto commitments in what was seen as a notable victory for German and his party, including a freeze in prescription charges and the introduction of free school milk for children below the age of seven, free local bus travel for pensioners and financial support for students attending university. On 15 October, German persuaded a special conference of the Welsh Liberal Democrats to vote in favour of the deal. The new coalition cabinet was officially formed on 16 and 17 October, with the coalition agreement formally signed by Morgan and German on 17 October. Two Liberal Democrats, German and Jenny Randerson, were given cabinet posts.

=== Deputy First Minister of Wales ===
==== Minister for Economic Development ====
On the formation of the coalition cabinet on 16 October, German became the first-ever deputy first minister of Wales, serving under Morgan who remained first minister. (Note: Under the terms of the Putting Wales First coalition deal between Welsh Labour and the Welsh Liberal Democrats, the devolved administration of Wales was officially recognised as a government, with the titles of ministerial posts in the Welsh Cabinet dropping the term assembly secretary for the term minister; the office of First Secretary of Wales was renamed First Minister of Wales.) He was also appointed as the minister for economic development, succeeding Morgan in the role, which made him and his party responsible for the government's policy on the Objective One programme. This was controversial with some local councillors from the Labour Party, who believed Morgan had conceded too much in the coalition to German and the Liberal Democrats. Labour's Alun Pugh was made his deputy minister for economic development. In his first weeks in office, German went to the European Commission in Brussels to discuss introducing different economic conditions for the funding in Wales' different regions. He also established a new government task and finish group for the Objective One programme to address the issues facing its delivery and to provide support to the Wales European Funding Office in the delivery of the programme.

The hopes and aspirations of Wales for Objective One are high, but I am also aware of a lot of anxiety that the programme may not be moving ahead quickly enough and concerns that it is not on track to deliver the maximum benefit ... [The task of the Group] will be to bring together local and regional action plans and look at how they fit into the strategy of the single programming document.

— Mike German on the Objective One Task and Finish Group, which he set up during his first weeks in office.

On 25 October, German named the first 16 projects which would qualify for financial support from the Objective One programme. At a total of £27 million of financial support for an estimated 60,000 people in the regions of West Wales and the South Wales Valleys, the announcement covered projects which intended to encourage education and training, improve people's skills in business and support the unemployed in finding work. In November, he named 12 more projects in the same regions which would join the programme, worth a total of £8.8 million in financial support. In early December, German visited Brussels to further explore economic incentives from the Objective One programme for Wales.

In early January 2001, German announced plans for a £20 million rescue package to prevent expected job losses after the steel manufacturer Corus announced it would lay off a significant number of staff at its plants in Wales. Measures in the planned package included lowered business rates for Corus plants in Wales, the purchase of surplus land from Corus, the provision of environmental incentives, support for training and research and the development of new job markets. Corus was reluctant to discuss the package with the government and a week after its publication announced it would close down its plants in Ebbw Vale and some of its plants in Llanwern. Following its announcement, Corus claimed that the government did not offer a rescue package to the organisation, a claim German denied. After Corus' announcement, the government's focus shifted to addressing the resulting job losses. In June 2001, German announced a new £5.3 million financial support package for over 3,000 Corus steelworkers in East Wales, West Wales and the South Wales Valleys who were facing redundancy by the organisation's plans. The package had been negotiated by German and Corus trade unions and made up of Welsh and EU government funding.

In 2001, tourism in Wales had experienced a downturn as a result of that year's foot-and-mouth outbreak across Britain. German's ministerial department was tasked with reviving the industry in Wales. In March, £1 million in financial support was granted to the Wales Tourist Board to fund a marketing campaign to encourage potential holidaymakers to visit Wales. In the same month, German published a tourism charter which made recommendations to local authorities, national parks and other tourism operators on which attractions were still safe enough to open to visitors. German also implemented several other measures to deal with the outbreak, including the creation of a rural hardship fund, an extension to the Small Firms Loan Guarantee, £12 million in financial support for tax rates, free support to rural companies hit by the disease and tax deferrals for National Insurance, VAT and PAYE. Carwyn Jones, the minister for agriculture and rural affairs, also established a new rural partnership group co-chaired by himself and German to lead the government's recovery plan for rural companies once the foot-and-mouth outbreak had come to an end. German also visited Cardiff Airport in March with Sue Essex, the minister for the environment, planning and transport, to discuss renovating the airport.

In 2001, German established a new advisory group to support him in developing and introducing a new government grant for small and medium-sized enterprises (SMEs) in Wales and making sure it complied with EU aid regulations. German also launched a new £13 million EU community scheme called EQUAL in March 2001 to fund campaigns against inequality and discrimination in the labour market. The scheme intended to support equal opportunities and address social disadvantages in Wales.

==== WJEC expenses investigation ====
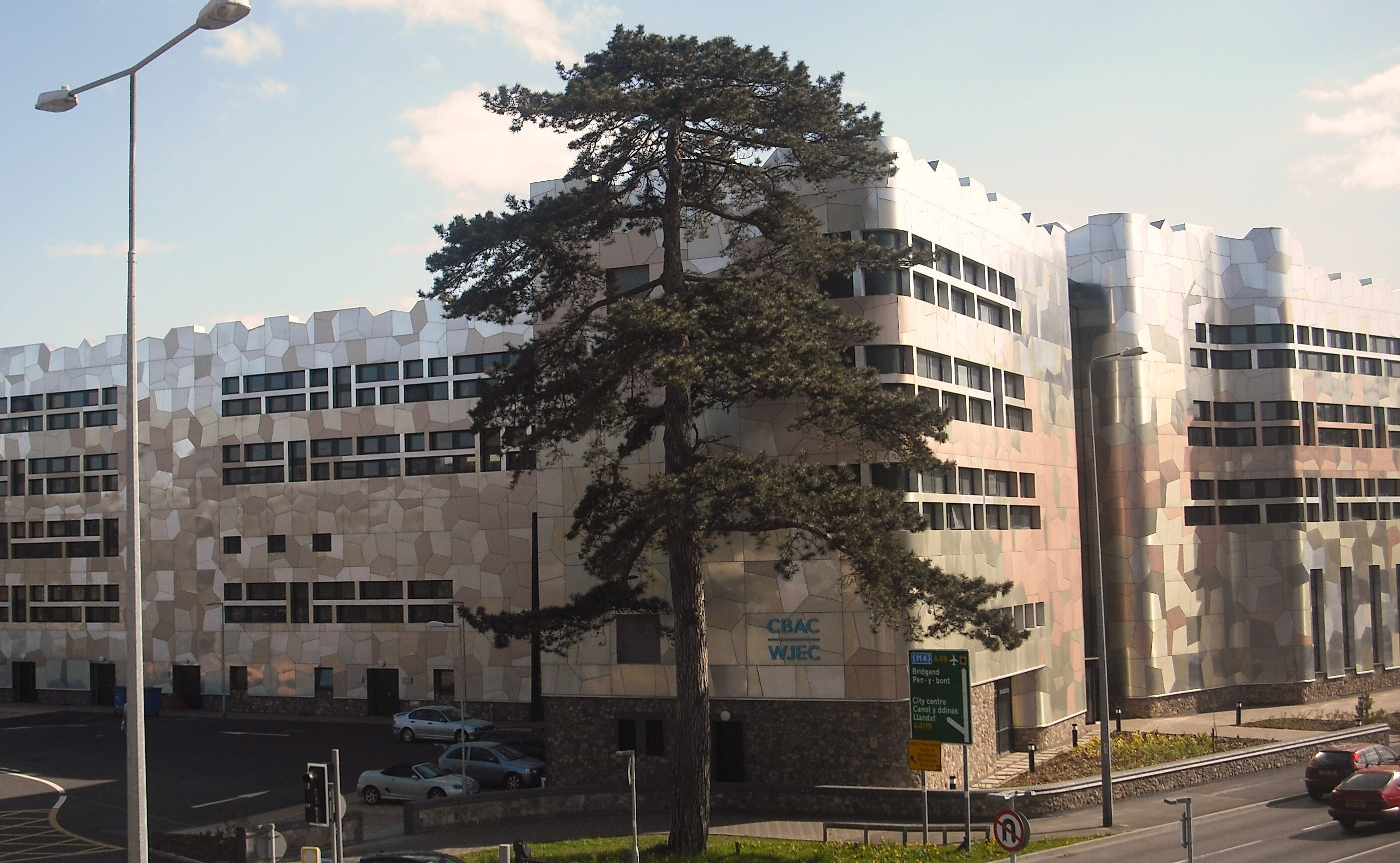
The headquarters of German's former employer the WJEC in Llandaff, Cardiff, 2010. He was investigated by auditors and the police after he was accused of financial misconduct at the WJEC after his appointment to the cabinet.

German's first year in the coalition was mired from a public dispute between himself and his former employer the Welsh Joint Education Committee (WJEC), which was run by Labour-controlled local education authorities at the time. German had worked at the WJEC some years earlier as the head of its European unit before leaving the organisation in May 1999. In July 1999, it emerged that the unit had made significant losses of up to £218,000 in the year leading up to July. In the days following German's appointment to the cabinet in October 2000, German was accused in the press of financial misconduct during his tenure at the WJEC; he was accused of having contributed to the European unit's financial deficit by overspending and misusing his expenses during his tenure there, accusations which he denied. The WJEC initiated an independent audit into the matter with its results given to the police after its completion in April 2001. Labour's Jeff Jones, the chair of the WJEC and leader of Bridgend County Borough Council, called on German to resign from the cabinet for the duration of the audit. In response, German claimed that Labour's council leaders in the governing body of the WJEC were trying to destabilise the coalition in a politically motivated smear campaign against him; the implementation of proportional representation for local council elections in Wales had been agreed in the coalition deal, a policy which was unpopular with many Labour councillors. This led to a public dispute between Jones and German, with German initially refusing to resign from the cabinet.

=== Later assembly career ===
Under a Labour-Liberal Democrat coalition he became Deputy First Minister 2000–01 (and Economic Development Secretary) and again in 2002–03 (and Minister for Rural Affairs and Wales Abroad). He stepped down from the role of Deputy First Minister between the two dates to answer allegations made about his role at the Welsh examination board, the WJEC. During this period he was temporarily replaced by Jenny Randerson as Acting Deputy First Minister.

In November 2007, Mike German became leader of the Welsh Liberal Democrats, after Lembit Opik stood down to ensure that the leadership of the party was in the National Assembly and not Westminster. He was succeeded in 2008 by Kirsty Williams.

German's political interests include skills development in small and large companies in Wales, constitutional affairs, local government, economy and regeneration.

== House of Lords ==
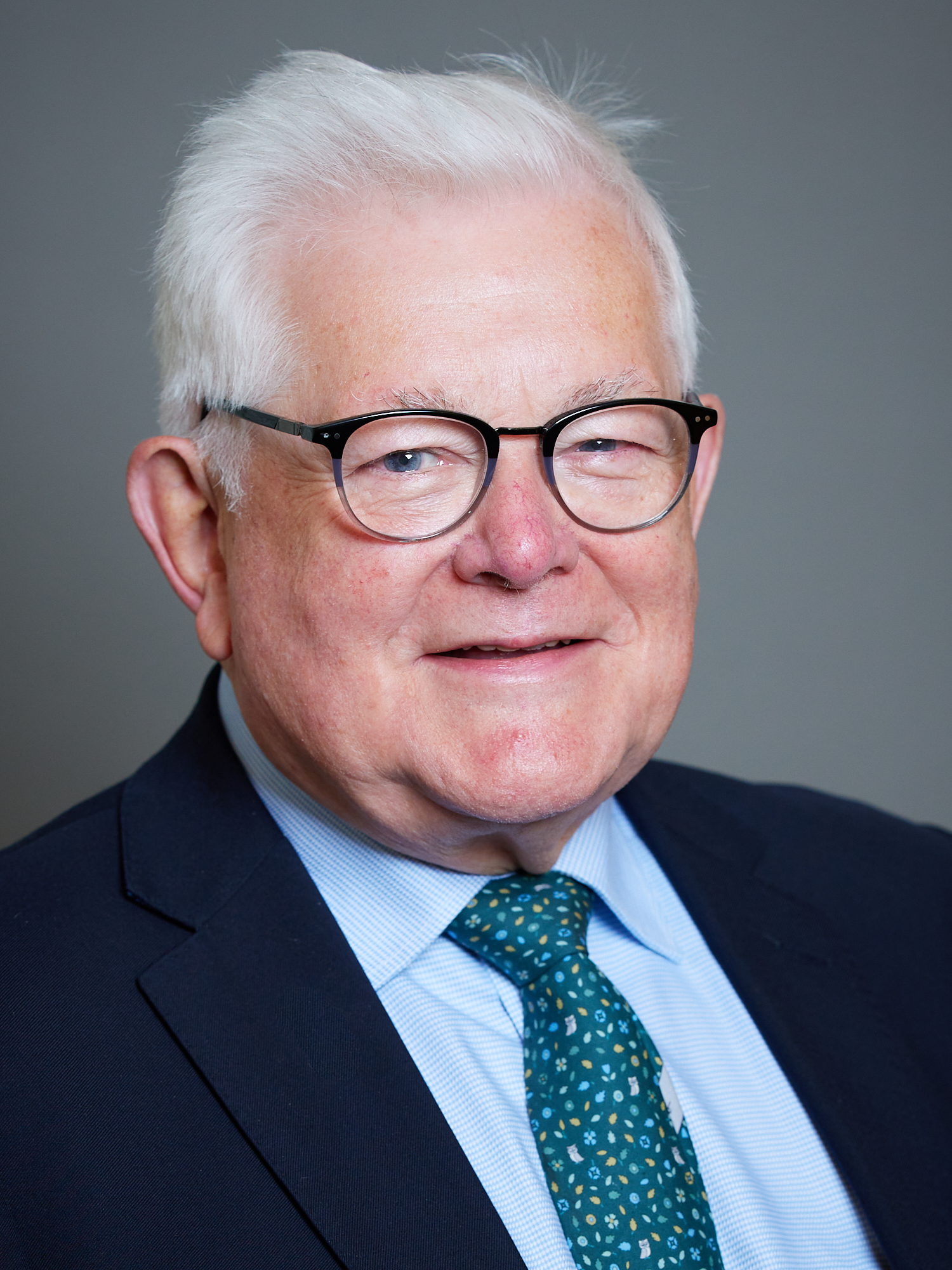
Official portrait in the House of Lords, 2018.

In Prime Minister Gordon Brown's 2010 Dissolution Honours list issued on 28 May 2010, German was nominated to serve as a working peer for life in the House of Lords for the Liberal Democrats. According to German, he had been offered a peerage "many months" beforehand by federal Liberal Democrat leader Nick Clegg, adding that he had been "thrilled" at the offer. Elizabeth II approved his nomination and he was created Baron German, of Llanfrechfa in the County Borough of Torfaen, on 29 June 2010. In May 2010, he announced that he would stand down from the assembly to serve in the Lords. He was introduced to the Lords in June 2010 with his wife Veronica German, a Liberal Democrat councillor, succeeding him as AM for South Wales East on 1 July 2010, having been entitled to do so as the next candidate behind German on the Liberal Democrats' top-up list for that region.

In the House of Lords, German said his main focus would be to "abolish myself" and replace the Lords with an elected upper chamber, adding that "in all major democracies the upper house has a democratic base". He said he hoped that this reform would be made by the end of the term of the recently formed UK coalition government between the Conservatives and the Liberal Democrats in 2015, arguing that doing so would make the UK Government "much more open and honest with the people of Wales and the rest of the United Kingdom". He also said he would continue to campaign on issues related to his assembly constituency in the Lords and work to act as a "strong voice" for the National Assembly and its efforts to cooperate with the UK Parliament and gain more powers.

For the duration of the coalition, the Liberal Democrats in the UK Parliament set up parliamentary party committees which shadowed government ministries to address the concerns of its backbenchers. German served as the co-chair of its committee for work and pensions alongside MP Jenny Willott. During this period, German said he agreed with the government's principle that benefit claimants should not receive more than the average working family, but argued that its policy for a benefit cap should not cover child benefit. In November 2011, he said the cap would "punish children for the decisions of their parents" who "have little or no control over the upbringing they receive" and also suggested it could "encourage family breakdown as families split in order to get their benefit entitlement". He also expressed concern for the government's bedroom tax policy and in 2013 asked that disabled people who have to share a bedroom with cohabitants receive an exemption from the policy. However, he opposed a motion at the October 2014 Liberal Democrat Conference which would endorse the effective abolition of bedroom tax by calling for its removal for tenants of social and private housing, stating that by connecting the two sectors it could make landlords in the private sector reluctant to take on tenants who required alternative housing provision. Ahead of the roll out of the coalition's new Universal Credit scheme in 2013, German called on the government to fund landlords and housing associations so that they could provide support to their tenants through the scheme, arguing that this was necessary to make universal credit a success.

From 1 June to 7 September 2015, German served as the Liberal Democrats' spokesperson for work and pensions in the House of Lords. He has served in several parliamentary committees in the Lords, including the EU Internal Market Sub-Committee from 23 June 2015 to 2 July 2019, the Democracy and Digital Technologies Committee from 13 June 2019 to 16 June 2020 and the Secondary Legislation Scrutiny Committee from 2 July 2020 to 31 January 2023. He was also a member of the House of Lords Commission from 28 January 2021 to 31 January 2024 and the Restoration and Renewal Client Board from 17 October 2022 to 31 January 2024.

In March 2020, German, aged 74, continued to attend the House of Lords after the outbreak of the COVID-19 pandemic, ignoring health advice from the government which recommended that elderly people self-isolate at home and keep away from social gatherings. He was one of several elderly peers who did so. In April 2020, he participated in a Liberal Democrat campaign in the Lords which called for the government to release low-risk prisoners to prevent the spread of COVID-19 in overcrowded prisons. In the same month, he penned an article for PoliticsHome which warned that the spread of the disease in overcrowded prisons was "a perfect storm" which could lead to a further spread throughout the rest of the prison system and in turn the wider general public. In July 2020, he led a House of Lords debate on the government's new policy of dividing prisoners into three groups, one of infected prisoners, one of prisoners who are having symptoms of COVID-19 and may be infected, and one of prisoners who were vulnerable to the disease. German said the policy was failing to prevent the spread of COVID-19 and was "potentially leading to more and more inmates contracting the virus, turning prisons into an incubator for the disease", and again put forward his party's policy of releasing low-risk prisoners. During this period, German also expressed concerns for the planning law reforms being implemented by Boris Johnson's Conservative government, which he described as "deregulatory in effect" and said "could result in low-quality housing" and reduce local scrutiny of planning applications "by the back door".

German was an opponent of the Rwanda asylum plan of Boris Johnson, Liz Truss and Rishi Sunak's Conservative governments. In December 2023, Sunak's government put forward the Safety of Rwanda (Asylum and Immigration) Bill to overrule a ruling from the Supreme Court which declared Rwanda an unsafe country for refugees, which had therefore made the plan illegal to implement. In response, German claimed that the government was removing the human rights of asylum seekers and was going down "a dangerous slippery slope", asking about the possibility of the government targeting other unfavoured groups. In January 2024, he said the legislation "treats some of the most vulnerable people in the world – people who are facing persecution, torture and fleeing for their lives – as undesirable". In the same month, he led an attempt by the 80 Liberal Democrat peers in the House of Lords to block the bill by tabling a motion which would overrule its earlier passage in the House of Commons and deny it a second reading. German said he did this because the bill, in his view, put the UK at risk by breaking international law and threatening the rule of law by ignoring the courts, and by failing to legislate for action against gangs of human smugglers and new legal and safe routes for refugees to settle in the UK. It was convention for the Lords not to overrule the Commons in this way under the terms of the long-agreed Salisbury Doctrine, however German argued that this was a rare situation where taking such a course of action to stop the bill was justified. German's motion in the Lords failed to succeed with 84 votes in favour to 206 votes against; the Labour Party in the Lords did not support Michael's motion despite opposing the bill and it passed at its second reading. In May 2024, Sunak's government delayed the implementation of the plan until after the 2024 general election in July, which was widely expected to be won by the Labour Party which pledged to end the plan should it enter government. This led German to opine that the plan would likely not be implemented, after which he said the money which had already been spent on the plan should have been spent on the NHS instead.

== Personal life ==
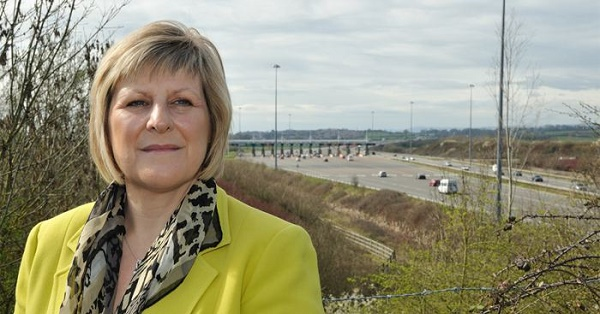
German married Veronica Watkins, a Liberal Democrat councillor and teacher from Newport, in 2006. She worked in his assembly constituency office and succeeded him as AM for South Wales East in 2010.

German married Newport teacher and Liberal Democrat councillor Veronica Watkins in 2006. She worked in his constituency office in the National Assembly for Wales and later succeeded him as AM for South Wales East after he left the assembly for the House of Lords in 2010. German has two daughters from a previous marriage with Georgette German, who had served with him as a Liberal Democrat councillor on Cardiff City Council. The couple had divorced and separated by 1998.

Outside of politics, German has an interest in music, which he has said he finds relaxing to listen to. He can play bass, percussion and the piano. He is a Catholic and has linked his faith to his passion for music, performing as a church organist in his spare time. He also arranges musical compositions and has served as the chair of the UK Parliament Choir. He has named BBC Radio 4 as his favourite radio station and has stated his love for Radio 4 programmes The Archers, Desert Island Discs and Today. He also listens to political programmes and the news. His other interests include cycling and travelling.

In an interview with the South Wales Argus in 2019, German said he had lived in Cardiff at the time of his election to the National Assembly for Wales in 1999 but later moved to Argoed and then Cwmbran. In the aftermath of the parliamentary expenses scandal at the UK Parliament in 2009, the same newspaper investigated the expenses of AMs in Wales and found that German had claimed expenses on a one-bedroom house in Cardiff. This was his second home; his main home at the time was located near Cwmbran. Following the discovery, German said he generally spent "several nights a week in Cardiff" and believed his "claims reflect the expenditure requirement to be for Assembly business", adding that they were "justified to maintain a second home in Cardiff". He also said he "underst[ood] public concern about second homes" and said he would give any profits made from the sale of his second home back to the National Assembly.

German has served as the co-chair of the Anglo-Azerbaijani Society representing the United Kingdom, alongside Nargiz Pashayeva who has served as the co-chair representing Azerbaijan. He is a multilinguist and can speak English, French, Castilian and Catalan. German addressed other AMs in the latter three languages during a debate in the National Assembly for Wales in June 1999. He also started learning Welsh following his election to the National Assembly in May 1999. In one incident, German spoke in fluent Welsh during a television interview in July 1999 but was soon discovered to have been answering questions from a cue card which had English translations for each answer. He took part in a crash programme with Monmouth AM David TC Davies over the 1999 assembly summer recess to learn the language, having last taken lessons at school in 1961.

== Honours ==
In the 1996 New Year Honours, German was appointed an Officer of the Order of the British Empire "for political and public service". In 2008, political commentator Iain Dale ranked him as number 35 on his list of the top 50 Liberal Democrat politicians for that year. He was given a life peerage in Prime Minister Gordon Brown's 2010 Dissolution Honours list. As a baron, this gave him the honorific style of The Right Honourable for life. In 2015, Wales Online ranked him as number 11 on its list of the 20 "greatest Cardiffians".

== Offices held ==
National Assembly for Wales
New constituency	Assembly Member for South Wales East; 1999–2010	Succeeded by Veronica German
Political offices
New post	Leader of the Liberal Democrats in the National Assembly; 1999–2008	Succeeded by Kirsty Williams
Preceded by Lembit Öpik	Leader of the Welsh Liberal Democrats; 2007–2008	Succeeded by Kirsty Williams
New post	Deputy First Minister for Wales; 2000–2001	Succeeded by Jenny Randerson (Acting)
Preceded by Rhodri Morgan	Minister for Economic Development; 2000–2001	Succeeded by Rhodri Morgan
Preceded by Jenny Randerson (Acting)	Deputy First Minister for Wales; 2002–2003	Vacant Title last held by Ieuan Wyn Jones (2007–2011)
New post	Minister for Rural Affairs and Wales Abroad; 2002–2003	post abolished
Orders of precedence in the United Kingdom
Preceded by The Lord Gardiner of Kimble	Gentlemen; Baron German	Followed by The Lord Hutton of Furness
