= Veronica German =

British politician (born 1957)

The Right Honourable The Lady German
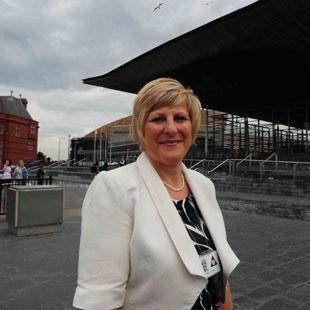
- German in 2010

Member of the Welsh Assembly for South Wales East
- In office 1 July 2010 – 31 March 2011
- Preceded by: Mike German
- Succeeded by: Lindsay Whittle

Member of Newport City Council
- In office 2004–2008

Member of Torfaen Borough Council
- In office 2008–2012

Personal details
- Born: 12 February 1957 (age 69)
- Party: Welsh Liberal Democrats
- Spouse: Mike German, Baron German
- Children: 3
- Portfolio: Health, Local Government and Equalities

Veronica Kathleen German, Baroness German (née Hopkins; born 12 February 1957) is a Welsh Liberal Democrat politician who was a Member of the Welsh Assembly (AM) for the South Wales East region between 2010 and 2011.

== Background ==
German has lived in the Newport and Cwmbran area for nearly 30 years. She graduated at Aston University where she studied Chemical Engineering, as well as achieving a Masters in Biochemical Engineering at the University of Birmingham. While a third year student as part of her sandwich degree course, she was assigned to the pilot plant at Cadburys Bournville when they were developing the production of bubbles into the Cadbury Wispa chocolate bar where she worked under her head of Dept. Dave Green.

She was a teacher for 25 years, where she taught Science, Maths and ICT in many schools across the former Gwent LEA area.

German has three children by her previous marriage, all born and brought up in Newport and educated locally at schools in Caerleon.

== Political career ==
German served as a Newport Liberal Democrat councillor between 2004 and 2008. In May 2008, she was elected as a Torfaen councillor representing Llanyrafon North.

In May 2010, the then Assembly Member for South Wales East, Mike German, her husband, was named to the House of Lords as a 'working peer' in the Dissolution Honours list. She succeeded him as an AM, as she was the next candidate on the regional party list in 2007.

German took up her seat as Assembly Member for South Wales East in July 2010, making her the first new member of the Assembly since 2007. Immediately after taking up her new position, German pledged to continue to campaign for the tolls at Severn Bridge to be reduced. Whist an Assembly Member, she was the Welsh Liberal Democrat Spokesperson for Health, Local Government and Equalities, as well as a member of the Petitions Committee; the Equal Opportunities Committee; the Health, Wellbeing and Local Government Committee; and Legislation Committee No. 3.

She failed to retain her list seat in the 2011 Assembly election. In the 2012 elections, she did not recontest her Llanyrafon North Council seat. She contested the Monmouth Assembly constituency during the 2016 election and the same seat in the 2017 general election, being unsuccessful on both occasions.

For the 2021 Senedd election, German was selected as the Lib Dem candidate for the Torfaen constituency. She finished fourth behind the Labour, Conservative and Plaid Cymru candidates.

== See also ==
- List of Welsh AMs/MSs with the shortest service

== Offices held ==
Senedd
Preceded by Mike German	Assembly Member for South Wales East; 2010 - 2011	Succeeded by Lindsay Whittle (Plaid)
Political offices
New post	Spokesperson for Health, Local Government and Equalities; 2010 - 2011	Unknown
