= Kent Midmorning =

Kent Midmorning The Julia George Show
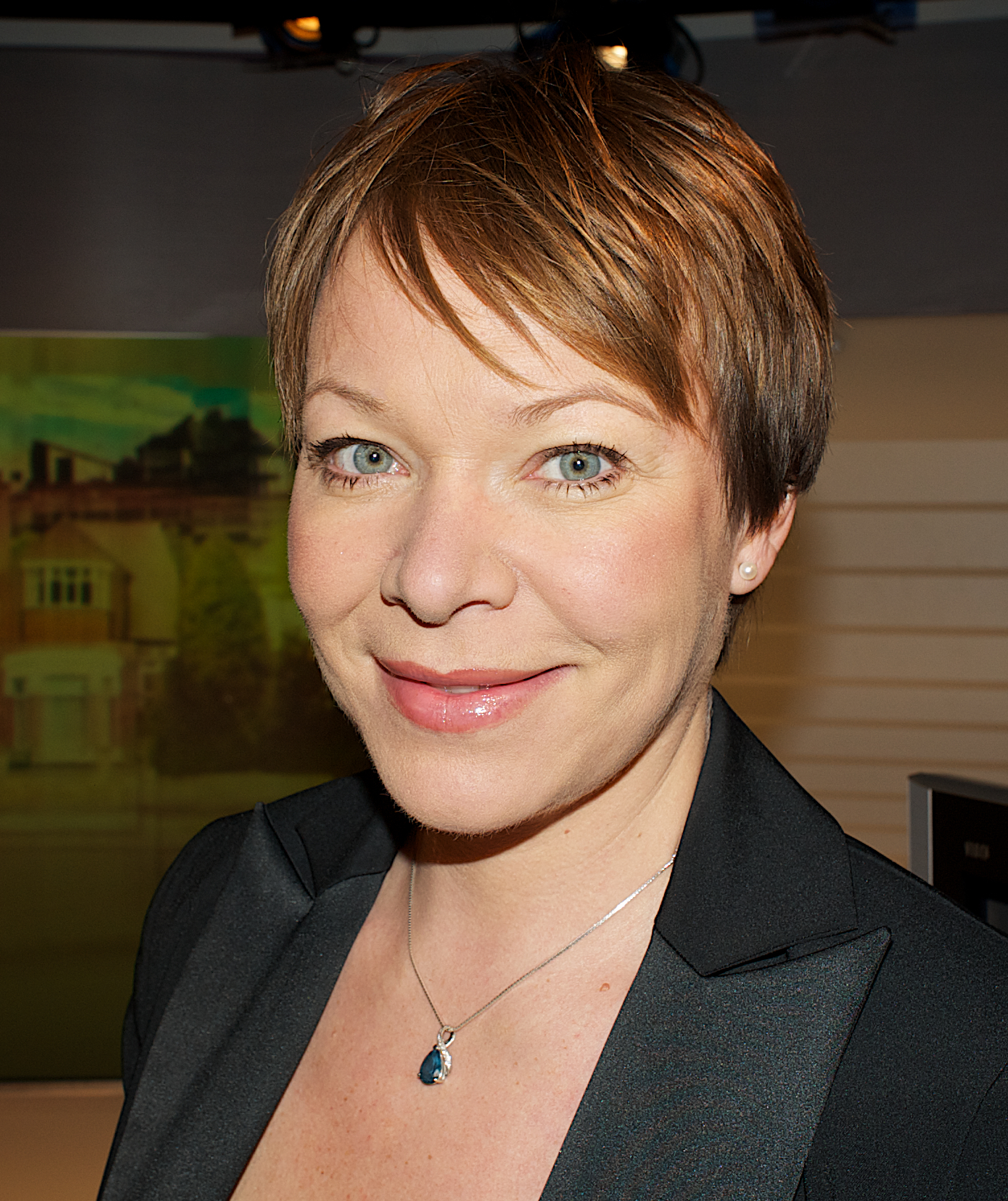
- Julia George presents Kent Midmorning.
- Genre: Public radio
- Running time: 3 hours (9:00 am – 12:00 pm)
- Country of origin: United Kingdom
- Language(s): English
- Home station: BBC Radio Kent
- Hosted by: Julia George (Mon-Thurs) Lembit Opik (Fri)
- Recording studio: Tunbridge Wells, Kent
- Website: www.bbc.co.uk/programmes/p009v85c/

Kent Midmorning or The Julia George Programme is a daytime radio show broadcast every weekday morning on BBC Radio Kent.

== The show ==
Julia George has been presenting the Kent Midmorning programme on BBC Radio Kent since 2010. From April 2015, Lembit Opik has presented the programme every Friday, as well as standing in on other days.

The team currently working on the programme are Clare Tiptaft, Faye Hackwell and Caroline Wordsworth (producers) and Andy Garland (senior broadcast journalist).

The show is broadcast between 9:00 and 12:00, Monday to Friday, from the BBC Radio Kent studios in Tunbridge Wells. Prior to Lembit joining the team, the Friday slot was covered by guest presenters.

It includes a news and current affairs phone-in, the subject often being discussed throughout the show. From late 2014, the show has included a monthly book club. This has been along with guest visits by the author either to discuss the books ahead of being suggested for reading or along with listeners who have read the book as book club review.

It is very much a listeners programme with both regular callers such as "Simon From Lenham", "Dave in Forest Gate" and "The Sittingbourne Trucker". There are also many listeners calling, emailing and texting their views on subjects as diverse as Immigration through to Street litter and on to Wikipedia.

== Awards ==
In November 2012, the programme with Julia George won journalist of the year award on Monday at the Media Awards from the mental health charity Mind.

Julia George has presented, and won awards at the Jerusalem Awards 2014.
