= Welsh Liberal Democrats =

Welsh branch of the Liberal Democrats

Welsh Liberal Democrats Democratiaid Rhyddfrydol Cymru
- Leader: David Chadwick
- Chief Executive: Mike O'Carroll
- Founded: 3 March 1988
- Headquarters: Pascoe House; 54 Bute Street; Cardiff. CF10 5AF
- Youth wing: Welsh Young Liberals
- Ideology: Liberalism; Social liberalism; British federalism; British unionism; Pro-Europeanism
- Political position: Centre to centre-left
- European affiliation: Alliance of Liberals and Democrats for Europe Party
- International affiliation: Liberal International
- UK Parliament affiliation: Liberal Democrats (UK); Cooperate with the English Liberal Democrats, Scottish Liberal Democrats, Northern Ireland Liberal Democrats, and Alliance Party
- Colours: Orange
- House of Commons: 1 / 32 (Welsh seats)
- Senedd: 1 / 96
- Councillors in Wales: 68 / 1,234
- Councils led in Wales: 1 / 22
- Police and crime commissioners: 0 / 4

Election symbol

Website
- www.libdems.wales

The Welsh Liberal Democrats (Welsh: Democratiaid Rhyddfrydol Cymru) is a liberal, federalist political party in Wales, part of UK Liberal Democrats. The party is led by David Chadwick who has served as MP for Brecon, Radnor and Cwm Tawe since 2024. The party currently has one elected member in the Senedd and one Welsh seat in the UK House of Commons. It also has several members of the House of Lords. The party had 69 local councillors serving in principal authorities as of the 2022 local authority elections, up 10 from 2017.

Mark Williams, then-Leader of the Welsh Liberal Democrats, was defeated at the 2017 general election in his Ceredigion constituency by Ben Lake of Plaid Cymru, whose majority of 104 made the seat one of the most marginal in the country. The result left the party without an MP in Wales; the party and its predecessors had continuously held parliamentary seats in Wales since the formation of the Liberal Party in 1859. The party regained representation in Westminster following the election of David Chadwick as the MP for Brecon, Radnor and Cwm Tawe in the July 2024 General Election.

== Organisation ==
=== Leader of the Welsh Liberal Democrats ===
No.	Image	Name	Term start	Term end
1		Richard Livsey	1988	1992
2		Alex Carlile	1992	1997
(1)		Richard Livsey	1997	2001
3		Lembit Öpik	17 September 2001	13 October 2007
4		Mike German	13 October 2007	8 December 2008
5		Kirsty Williams	8 December 2008	6 May 2016
6		Mark Williams	7 May 2016	16 June 2017
(5)		Kirsty Williams (acting)	16 June 2017	3 November 2017
7		Jane Dodds	3 November 2017	16 November 2026
8		David Chadwick	16 November 2026	Incumbent

=== Welsh Liberal Democrat Officers ===
- President of the Welsh Liberal Democrats: Tim Sly (Resignation in Progress)
- Deputy President: Cllr Sam Bennett (Resignation in Progress)
- Leader of the Welsh Liberal Democrats: David Chadwick MP
- Deputy Leader (Westminster): No Other MP Available (Alternative: Approved Parliamentary Candidate)

=== Youth wing ===
The youth wing of the party is Welsh Young Liberals.

- Chair:
- Vice-Chair:
- Policy Officer:
- Campaigns Officer:

== Policy platform ==
The Welsh Liberal Democrats promote liberalism as their main ideology, as well as further devolved powers for the Senedd with the aim of establishing a federal UK.

The Welsh Liberal Democrats support free public transport across Wales for everyone under the age of 25. The party also supports making Saint David's Day a public holiday in Wales. Furthermore, the party is in favour of an immediate 5% VAT cut for hospitality businesses.

At the Welsh Liberal Democrats manifesto launch for the 2024 United Kingdom general election, the party stated that funding for its proposals would be paid for by cancelling tax breaks for big banks and by reforming capital gains tax. These proposals included raising the minimum wage for carers, lifting the Carer Support Payment by £1,040 a year, establishing new mental health services, increasing the budget for Welsh agriculture by £50 million a year and £500 million in capital funding for Wales for new local health facilities, housing, fixing public buildings and stopping sewage dumping.

In January 2026, the Welsh Liberal Democrats called for rail to be devolved to Wales within two years.

== Elected representatives ==
Members of the Senedd (MSs)

Member of the Senedd	Constituency or Region	First elected
Jane Dodds	Mid and West Wales	2021

Members of Parliament (MPs)

Member of Parliament	Constituency	First elected
David Chadwick	Brecon, Radnor and Cwm Tawe	2024

== Appointments ==
=== House of Lords ===
Peer	Ennobled	Notes
Lord German of Llanfrechfa	2010	AM for South Wales East 1999 – 2010
Baroness Humphreys of Llanrwst	2013	AM for North Wales 1999 – 2001
Lord Roberts of Llandudno	2004	
Lord Thomas of Gresford	1996	

== History ==
=== Before 1945 ===
The Liberal Council for Wales was founded by David Lloyd George in 1897. This makes the Welsh Liberals the oldest of the political parties in Wales. It was the first to establish a truly Welsh identity. During the late 19th and early 20th centuries the Welsh Liberals were a home of radical Welsh nationalism. Through politicians such as T. E. ("Tom") Ellis and David Gee and the movement of Cymru Fydd (Wales to be [future]) Welsh nationalism was comparable at times to that occurring in Ireland. But in Wales the nationalist passion never spilled over into violence, and was also counterbalanced by the strong English Liberal capitalist base present within the party. In 1906 the Welsh Liberals reached their peak when 35 of Wales' 36 seats had MPs who took the Liberal whip. Until 1922 the Welsh Liberals dominated Welsh politics and also played a central role in British politics. William Harcourt, Reginald McKenna, David Alfred Thomas, 1st Viscount Rhondda, Sir Alfred Mond and David Lloyd George were just a few of the politicians who held central positions in the party and in the various Liberal-led governments from 1906 to 1922. The various splits within the Liberal Party from 1918 onwards, the rise of the Welsh Labour Party in South Wales, and the dominance of Lloyd George over the Welsh Liberal Party, all had their impact on Welsh Liberal fortunes. Despite this it was in Wales that the pre-war Liberals' support lasted longest in post-war British politics.

=== 1945–1983 ===
In 1945, the party had seven MPs in Wales, mainly in the Welsh-speaking north, mid and west Wales seats. Two of these MPs Gwilym Lloyd George (Pembrokeshire) and Megan Lloyd George (Anglesey) defected to the Conservative and Labour parties, respectively. Clement Davies, who held Montgomeryshire, became the post-war British Liberal leader. Davies died in 1962 and was succeeded by Emlyn Hooson, who then set about rebuilding the Welsh Liberal Party. When the last of the post-war Welsh Liberal MPs, Roderic Bowen (Cardiganshire), lost his seat in the 1966 general election Hooson, Lord Ogmore, Martin Thomas (Lord Thomas of Gresford), Roger Roberts (Lord Roberts of Llandudno) and Mary Murphy established the Welsh Liberal Party as a separate state party within the Liberal Party's federal structure. After its establishment in September 1966 the Liberal Party in Wales had limited success and never really enjoyed a great Liberal revival like that which had occurred under Jo Grimond in Scotland. Geraint Howells' election in Cardiganshire in February 1974 re-established the Liberal presence in that seat. In 1979, however, the Welsh Liberals suffered from the Lib–Lab pact, and support for the failed devolution referendum resulted in a poor election for the Liberals: over half of their 28 candidates lost their deposit. More importantly Emlyn Hooson lost his Montgomeryshire seat, leaving the Welsh party once more with a single seat (Howells' in Cardiganshire). Hooson was ennobled later that year and joined Howells once more at Westminster.

=== 1983–1997 ===
The arrival of the Social Democratic Party (SDP) in Wales and the formation of the SDP–Liberal Alliance gave the party an electoral boost, increased its representation on councils and helped retake the Montgomeryshire seat in 1983 (Alex Carlile) and win the Brecon and Radnor seat in a famous by-election in 1985 (Richard Livsey). In 1988, the SDP and most of the Liberals merged in Wales and after various names the three Welsh MPs insisted on the name being Welsh Liberal Democrats, which set a precedent for the rest of the Liberal Party. In the 1992 general election, Howells lost his seat and went to the Lords, Livsey lost Brecon and Radnor, which he would retake five years later. This left Alex Carlile as the sole Liberal Democrat MP. In 1996 Carlile announced his resignation and he was in turn replaced by Lembit Öpik. When Carlile stood down it ended the direct link with the professional Liberal barrister MPs that had been existent in the Welsh Liberal party for its whole history. Carlile became Lord Carlile of Berriew in 1999. Followed in 2001 by Richard Livsey (of Talgarth) and Roger Roberts (of Llandudno) in 2004.

=== 1997–2017 ===
In the 1997 general election, both Öpik and Livsey won their seats. Both then went forward to support the successful 1997 Welsh devolution referendum. They were joined in that campaign by other prominent figures in the Welsh party, including Michael German, Jenny Randerson, Peter Black, Roger Williams and Rob Humphreys. Except for Humphreys, they all soon gained electoral office, in either the Welsh Assembly or the Westminster Parliament. The Welsh Assembly elections in 1999 provided the party with six more elected representatives for Wales to join their two MPs, and three Welsh lords. At Westminster Roger Williams took over from Richard Livsey in Brecon and Radnor in 2001. In 2005 Mark Williams won the Ceredigion seat (formerly held by Geraint Howells); and Jenny Willott won the Cardiff Central seat, which was the first Liberal urban seat victory in Wales since 1935 and the first female Liberal MP in Wales since 1951. The four MPs were also the most since 1950 for the Liberal Party in Wales. It was Lembit Öpik who now headed the party at Westminster.

In 1998, Michael German was elected as designate leader Welsh Assembly group and led their 1999 election campaign and then the new Assembly group. Between 2001 and 2003, the party were in a coalition with Welsh Labour in the National Assembly. In this Labour-led government Michael German was Deputy First Minister whilst Jenny Randerson also held a ministerial post. Randerson's post made her the first female Liberal in the party's history to hold ministerial office. The Welsh Liberals achieved a breakthrough in local government in 2003, leading Swansea, Bridgend, Cardiff and Wrexham councils, with cabinet members on many more Welsh councils. In the 2003 Welsh Assembly elections the party remained stuck on six AMs (Assembly Members). They remained on this figure in the 2007 elections but were reduced to five in the 2011 elections. In 2008 German stood down as leader and was replaced by Kirsty Williams (the AM for Brecon and Radnor) in a contest with Jenny Randerson (Cardiff Central). Both German and Randerson subsequently went to the House of Lords. Baroness Randerson become the first ever Welsh female Liberal peer to sit in the House of Lords. Her two predecessors Viscountess St Davids and the 2nd Viscountess Rhondda, who had been ennobled in the first half of the 20th century, had died before women were allowed to sit in the House of Lords. Michael German was succeeded as the Assembly member for South Wales East by his wife Veronica German. In May 2011, however, she failed to be re-elected in South Wales East.

In September 2012, Baroness Randerson was appointed as the unpaid Parliamentary Under Secretary of State at the Wales Office. This was the first time a Welsh Liberal Democrat had held ministerial office at Westminster since 1945. Randerson was also the first female politician from the Welsh Liberals ever to hold a UK ministerial office.

=== 2017–present ===
Following the result of the 2017 general election, in which Mark Williams narrowly lost his Ceredigion constituency to Plaid Cymru, the Liberal Democrats were left without an MP in Wales, a situation which had not occurred since the founding of the Liberal Party in 1859. In the autumn of 2017, the leadership election was held, with two candidates, Jane Dodds and Elizabeth Evans, taking part. On 3 November 2017, Dodds was announced as the winner and immediately took over as leader.

In August 2019, Dodds regained House of Commons representation for the Welsh Liberal Democrats, winning the 2019 Brecon and Radnorshire by-election. However her stay in the House of Commons proved to be a short one, as she lost her seat by 7,131 votes at the December 2019 general election. With this the party yet again was left without any MPs.

In the aftermath of the result, BBC Wales' Political Editor Felicity Evans stated that the Lib Dems would "rue the day they pushed for this election".

Dodds gained a regional seat in Mid and West Wales at the 2021 Senedd election to become the party's only MS. The seat was only held by 714 votes.

In May 2022, the party significantly increased its council base on Powys County Council becoming the largest party enabling it to become the lead party in a coalition with Cllr James Gibson-Watt becoming the Leader of Council.

In March 2024, the leader of the Welsh Liberal Democrats, Jane Dodds said that the party will not join any coalition after the next UK general election, at that election the party saw its share of the vote increase with David Chadwick winning the newly redrawn seat of Brecon, Radnor and Cwm Tawe.

In the 2026 Senedd election, the Welsh Liberal Democrats held their single seat in the Senedd with Jane Dodds being re-elected in Brycheiniog Tawe Nedd.

== Election results ==
=== House of Commons ===
This chart shows the electoral results of the Welsh Liberals, and later Liberal Democrats, from its first election in 1900. Total numbers of parliamentary seats, and vote percentages, are for Wales only.

Election	Wales		+/–	Government
Election	%	Seats	+/–	Government
1900	58.5	27 / 34		Opposition
1906	60.2	32 / 34	▲5	Majority
Jan 1910	52.3	27 / 34	▼5	Minority
Dec 1910	47.9	26 / 34	▼1	Minority
1918	48.9	20 / 35	▼6	Opposition
1922	34.2	10 / 35	▼10	Opposition
1923	35.4	11 / 35	▲1	Opposition
1924	31.0	10 / 35	▼1	Opposition
1929	33.5	9 / 35	▼1	Opposition
1931	21.5	8 / 35	▼1	Opposition
1935	22.2	9 / 35	▲1	Opposition
1945	14.9	6 / 35	▼3	Opposition
1950	12.6	5 / 36	▼1	Opposition
1951	7.6	3 / 36	▼2	Opposition
1955	7.3	3 / 36	Steady	Opposition
1959	5.3	2 / 36	▼1	Opposition
1964	7.3	2 / 36	Steady	Opposition
1966	6.3	1 / 36	▼1	Opposition
1970	6.8	1 / 36	Steady	Opposition
Feb 1974	16.0	2 / 36	▲1	Opposition
Oct 1974	15.5	2 / 36	Steady	Opposition
1979	10.6	1 / 36	▼1	Opposition
1983	23.2	2 / 36	▲1	Opposition
1987	17.9	3 / 36	▲1	Opposition
1992	12.4	1 / 36	▼2	Opposition
1997	12.3	2 / 40	▲1	Opposition
2001	13.8	2 / 40	Steady	Opposition
2005	18.4	4 / 40	▲2	Opposition
2010	20.1	3 / 40	▼1	Cons-LD
2015	6.5	1 / 40	▼2	Opposition
2017	4.5	0 / 40	▼1	Opposition
2019	6.0	0 / 40	Steady	Opposition
2024	6.5	1 / 32	▲1	Opposition

=== Senedd ===
Election	Constituency			Regional			Votes	%	Total seats	+/–	Government
Election	Votes	%	Seats	Votes	%	Seats	Votes	%	Total seats	+/–	Government
1999	137,857	13.5	3 / 40	128,008	12.5	3 / 20			6 / 60		Opposition (1999–2000)
1999	137,857	13.5	3 / 40	128,008	12.5	3 / 20			6 / 60		Lab–LD (2000–2003)
2003	120,250	14.1	3 / 40	108,013	12.7	3 / 20			6 / 60	Steady	Opposition
2007	144,450	14.8	3 / 40	114,500	11.7	3 / 20			6 / 60	Steady	Opposition
2011	100,259	10.6	1 / 40	76,349	8.0	4 / 20			5 / 60	▼1	Opposition
2016	78,165	7.7	1 / 40	65,504	6.5	0 / 20			1 / 60	▼4	Lab–LD–Ind
2021	54,202	4.9	0 / 40	48,217	4.3	1 / 20			1 / 60	Steady	Opposition
2026 (Note: Starting with the 2026 election, the Senedd was increased to 96 members who are all elected through closed list proportional representation (using the D'Hondt method) in sixteen six-member constituencies)							56,012	4.5	1 / 96	Steady	Opposition

== See also ==
- English Liberal Democrats
- Scottish Liberal Democrats
- Northern Ireland Liberal Democrats
