= Lembit Öpik =

British politician

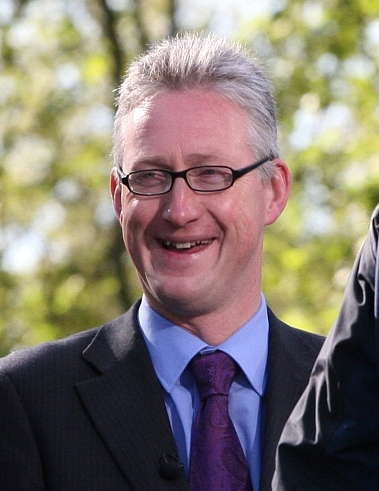
- Öpik in 2010

Liberal Democrat Spokesman for Housing
- In office 20 December 2007 – 24 September 2008
- Leader: Nick Clegg
- Preceded by: Paul Holmes
- Succeeded by: Sarah Teather

Liberal Democrat Spokesman for Business, Enterprise and Regulatory Reform
- In office 4 July 2007 – 20 December 2007
- Leader: Menzies Campbell
- Preceded by: Susan Kramer
- Succeeded by: Sarah Teather

Liberal Democrat Spokesman for Wales and Northern Ireland
- In office 26 January 2004 – 4 July 2007
- Leader: Charles Kennedy; Menzies Campbell
- Succeeded by: Alistair Carmichael (Lib Dem Spokesman for Northern Ireland); Roger Williams (Lib Dem Spokesperson for Wales)

Leader of the Welsh Liberal Democrats
- In office 17 September 2001 – 13 October 2007
- Leader: Charles Kennedy; Sir Menzies Campbell
- Preceded by: Richard Livsey
- Succeeded by: Mike German

Member of Parliament for Montgomeryshire
- In office 2 May 1997 – 12 April 2010
- Preceded by: Alex Carlile
- Succeeded by: Glyn Davies

Personal details
- Born: 2 March 1965 (age 61) Bangor, County Down, Northern Ireland
- Party: Reform UK (since 2025)
- Other political affiliations: Independent (2021–2025); Liberal Democrats (1991–2021)
- Domestic partner(s): Siân Lloyd (2002–2006); Gabriela Irimia (2006–2008); Sabina Vankova (2015–)
- Children: 2 daughters
- Relatives: Ernst Öpik (grandfather)
- Education: Royal Belfast Academical Institution; Bishop Milner Catholic College
- Alma mater: University of Bristol (BA)

Lembit Öpik (/ˈlɛmbɪt ˈoʊpɪk/, Estonian: [ˈlembit ˈøpˑik]; born 2 March 1965) is a British former politician. A former member of the Liberal Democrats, he served as the Member of Parliament (MP) for the constituency of Montgomeryshire in Wales from 1997 until he lost his seat at the 2010 general election. He was the leader of the Welsh Liberal Democrats from 2001 to 2007.

Öpik stood unsuccessfully for the position of President of the party in 2004 and 2008. He was also unsuccessful in a bid to become the Liberal Democrats' nominee in the 2012 London mayoral election.

Beyond his political work, Öpik has also been in the public eye through his appearances on several television shows and as a result of his personal relationships with ITV weather presenter Siân Lloyd and with pop star Gabriela Irimia of the Cheeky Girls, which drew considerable media attention.

== Early life ==
Öpik's parents were from Estonia, but after the Soviet occupation under Joseph Stalin, they fled to Northern Ireland. Öpik was born in Bangor, County Down, the elder son of Liivi Öpik (née Vedo) and physicist Uuno Öpik (19 October 1926 – 6 May 2005), and grew up there with sister Urve Öpik (born 1960, a psychotherapist) and brother Endel "Tal" Öpik (12 April 1968 – 21 November 2005, a musician). His grandfather was Ernst Öpik, an Estonian astronomer who worked at Armagh Observatory.

Öpik was educated at the Royal Belfast Academical Institution and Bishop Milner Catholic College before going on to the University of Bristol, where he completed a degree in philosophy. He served as the President of the University of Bristol Union (1985–86) and as a member of the National Executive of the National Union of Students (1987–88).

In 1988, Öpik joined Procter & Gamble in Newcastle upon Tyne as a brand assistant. He became corporate training and organisation development manager in 1991 and was promoted to be global human resources training manager in 1996. Öpik was elected to the Liberal Democrats' Federal Executive Committee in 1991. He was elected as a councillor on Newcastle City Council in 1992.

Öpik stood unsuccessfully as a candidate for Newcastle upon Tyne Central in the 1992 general election and for Northumbria in the 1994 European Parliament elections.

== Parliamentary and party career ==
=== Member of Parliament ===
At the 1997 general election, the Liberal Democrat MP for Montgomeryshire, Alex Carlile, retired and Öpik successfully stood as the Lib Dem candidate. He retained the seat at the 2001 general election and at the 2005 general election, increasing his share of the vote by 3.5% in 2001 and by a further 1.8% in 2005, giving him a majority of 7,173 over the Conservative candidate. However, he lost his seat to the Conservative Glyn Davies following a 13.2% swing in Montgomeryshire at the 2010 general election.

Öpik served as the Liberal Democrat spokesman on education (1997), Northern Ireland (1997–2007), Wales (2001–07), business (2007), and housing (2007–08).

During the 1997–2001 Parliament, Öpik was a member of the Agriculture Select Committee. During the 2001–05 Parliament, Öpik was a member of the Environment, Food and Rural Affairs Select Committee in the House of Commons. He was the joint chair of the Middle Way Group, a cross-party parliamentary group which supported the regulation, rather than the banning, of fox hunting.

=== Welsh party leadership ===
Öpik became leader of the Welsh Liberal Democrats in 2001 following the retirement of Richard Livsey. He stood down in 2007 and was succeeded by Mike German.

=== Campaigns for party presidency ===
In September 2004, Öpik stood for the position of President of the Liberal Democrats but was defeated by Simon Hughes. The party president chairs a number of party committees and also represents the party at official functions.

In 2008, a campaign amongst grassroots party members backing him as a successor to Hughes, under the slogan "I Pick Öpik", emerged at the party's 2008 spring conference in Liverpool. On 24 September, Öpik announced that he was standing down as the party's housing spokesman to concentrate on a campaign for party president. However, in the party ballot in November, Öpik was defeated by Baroness Scott of Needham Market by 20,736 votes to 6,247.

=== Support for party leadership candidates ===
In successive Liberal Democrat leadership contests, Öpik gained a reputation for backing campaigns that soon collapsed, leading some to talk of the "curse of Lembit" making his backing undesirable. In 1999, he was one of only two of the party's 46 MPs to back the abortive leadership campaign of Don Foster. Foster abandoned his campaign before nominations even closed, and backed Charles Kennedy, the eventual winner, instead.

During the 2006 leadership contest, Öpik was initially a strong supporter of Kennedy, who then stood down. Öpik subsequently became campaign manager for Mark Oaten. However, Oaten quickly withdrew from the contest, having failed to attract enough support from within the parliamentary party; his only backers were Öpik and Baroness Ludford. In the 2007 leadership election, Öpik declared his backing for Nick Clegg, and when Clegg won the election Öpik said "My man won, so the curse of Öpik has at last become a blessing".

Öpik supported Jenny Randerson in the 2008 contest for leadership of the Welsh Liberal Democrats. Randerson lost to Kirsty Williams. Öpik supported Tim Farron in the 2015 Liberal Democrat leadership election, who eventually won with a margin of 13%.

=== Expenses row and criticism ===
In May 2009 The Daily Telegraph published details of Öpik's parliamentary expenses claims. It showed that in 2008–2009 he claimed £23,083 in second home allowances out of public funds, including various items of furniture and a £40 summons charge for non-payment of Council Tax. Öpik told The Telegraph "I am willing to pay back the £40" but did not offer to repay anything else. The Telegraph also outlined a rejected expense claim he had attempted to make for £2,499 for a plasma screen television, after which he bought one costing £750.

== Post-parliament career ==
Öpik lost his seat in parliament at the 2010 general election when he was defeated in his constituency of Montgomeryshire by Glyn Davies of the Conservative Party by 13,976 votes to 12,792. This represented a swing of 12.5% against Öpik and a swing of 13.8% in favour of the Conservatives in the constituency. Öpik put himself forward to be the Liberal Democrats' nominee for mayor of London in the 2012 mayoral election, but in the first round of the party's selection ballot, he came fourth with 252 votes and was eliminated from the process.

Öpik was a candidate for the Liberal Democrats' federal executive committee in 2012 but was not elected. He also expressed an interest in becoming the Liberal Democrats' candidate for the position of Police and crime commissioner for Northumbria Police in 2012. However, he was ruled ineligible because he did not have a residence in the region.

Late in 2012, he joined Leadenhall Consulting, a human resources consulting firm specialising in the insurance and financial sectors, as an associate director responsible for developing training. On joining the firm, Öpik explained that training is his "first love". Öpik is a long-time supporter of the Motorcycle Action Group (MAG UK) and a keen motorcyclist. On 23 November 2013, it was announced that Öpik had joined MAG as director of communications and public affairs. In the post, he will work on behalf of motorcyclists in the UK and Europe.

He presents programmes on BBC Radio Kent every Friday morning from 9:00 where he hosts the topical Kent Midmorning phone-in, and every Sunday from 11:00 where he presents a news panel format, digesting the week's local, national and international stories, looking at the newspapers, welcoming expert guests and politicians for discussions as well as taking calls from listeners. He also regularly stands in for Julia George on other weekday mornings. Since 2010, he has broadcast for Press TV, including hosting a news satire show and a number of political news programmes. He currently hosts A Simple Question.

On 24 June 2018, Öpik was elected as the chairman of the self-proclaimed and unrecognised parliament of the micronation Asgardia during the first parliamentary session in Vienna, Austria. "The birth of the new space nation Asgardia" was announced in a press conference in Paris, France, on 12 October 2016 Öpik was elected for a second term as Chair of Asgardian Parliament on 25 August 2023.

In the autumn of 2018, Öpik considered participating in Estonian elections. He said he had been asked to consider being either a member of the Estonian parliament, or to consider running as president. "One position is just to be a member of parliament, which I would not mind doing", he said. "The other position is president of Estonia. It is more than just a non-executive role—I could make quite a big splash. I have not got a campaign plan but I have said I would be interested. It's not an appointed job, I would have to stand for it."

In 2021, Öpik was reported to have been expelled from the Liberal Democrats following his appearance at a Conservative Party meeting as the sole speaker in an event called "How to Stop the Lib Dems, an insiders guide on how the Lib Dems plan their campaigns."

In September 2022 he was announced as an upcoming speaker at the 2022 UKIP conference. and addressed the conference on "wokeness" in October.

In August 2025, he joined Reform at the 2025 Reform UK conference. He told a reporter: "I go where the money is."

== Journalism and media appearances ==
=== Public appearances ===
Öpik has appeared several times on the BBC satirical current affairs quiz show Have I Got News for You, including an appearance on the day after he lost his parliamentary seat. He has also appeared on the BBC's Question Time and Any Questions? Away from politics, he has also appeared on Stand Up for the Week, Al Murray's Happy Hour, All Star Mr & Mrs, Loose Women, Bargain Hunt Famous Finds, Ant & Dec's Saturday Night Takeaway and Come Dine with Me, Celebrity Juice and I'm a Celebrity...Get Me Out of Here!

In June 2010, he made his debut as a comedian at the Backstage Comedy Club in London's West End. It was described by one audience member as "not fantastic, but not completely awful".

Öpik also gained media attention for his part in a music video by unsigned band The Good Suns. The video featured the politician dancing and miming lyrics to their debut song "Pop Wound".

In March 2012, Öpik began collaborating with rock band Adam and the Asbos on their action/adventure sci-fi film Adam and the Asbos: The Movie. In April and May 2012, he made appearances in a professional wrestling promotion, appearing from the audience to confront wrestler Kade Callous for cheating; Öpik was in turn challenged to appear in a later tag team match, which ended with Öpik "black and blue".

In August 2016, Öpik performed in the comedy Rocking Your Vote, in which he played himself. The play, performed for the Edinburgh Festival Fringe, starred 2015 parliamentary candidate for West Bromwich Will Goodhand.

Since 2021, Öpik has been a contributor to GB News.

=== Writings and journalism ===
In 2009, Öpik published an article in The Guardian entitled "We need a cosmic plan" about risks of asteroid impact on Earth. Earlier, in 1999, he called on the government to invest between £500,000 and £1m annually in tracking asteroids to avert catastrophe. He wrote a column in the (now defunct) Daily Sport newspaper earning him up to £5,000 a year.

With Hilary Bird and Ulvi Mustmaa, he is the author of the Xenophobe's Guide to the Estonians, published by Oval Books in June 2010. In March 2012, Öpik released his first collaborative work with Edward Joyce, The Alternative View, a book discussing the future of the Liberal Democrats in the UK, including a call for the then party leader Nick Clegg to step down as Leader of The Liberal Democrats, but to remain deputy prime minister in the coalition government. The book's cover pays tribute to The Orange Book, although Öpik has often been considered a member of the 'social liberal', left wing of the party. His book All at Sea, a tale about a curious cruise, was published in 2015.

== Personal life and charity work ==
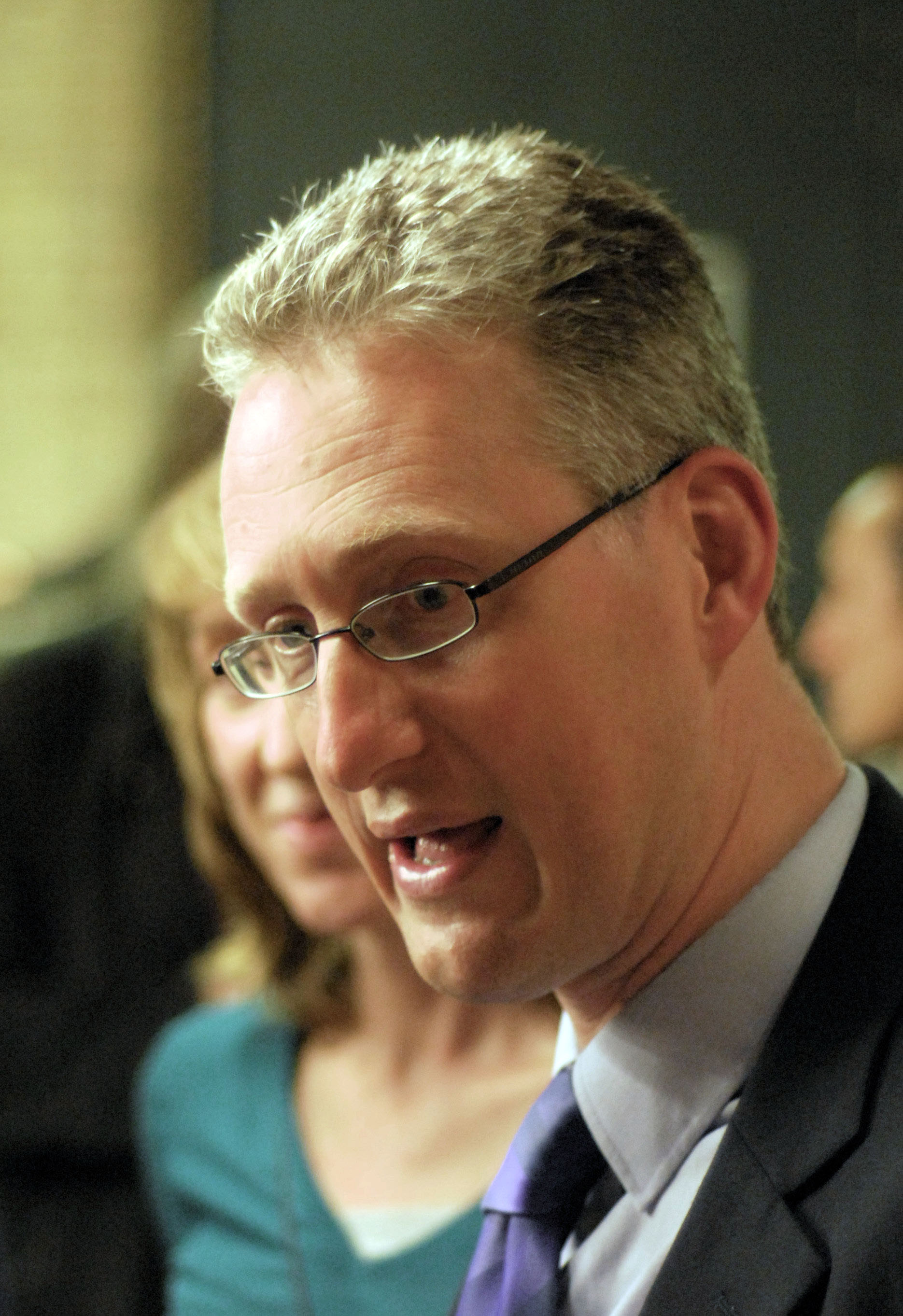
Öpik in 2006

Öpik is the son of atomic physicist Uuno Öpik and the grandson of astronomer Ernst Öpik. He speaks fluent English, Estonian and German. Talking about the 2004 Parliamentary Language Challenge, he said that he could "get by" in French and Welsh and was intending to become fluent in the Welsh language. In 2003 he was a "day president" at the National Eisteddfod of Wales, held at Meifod within his constituency; this required him to make a speech in Welsh, for which he was coached by his then girlfriend, Siân Lloyd.

On 13 April 1998 Öpik came close to death in a paragliding accident. He fell 80 feet (24 m) onto a Welsh mountain in his constituency and broke his back in 12 places, as well as his ribs, sternum and jaw. This experience caused him to take a keen interest in the Spinal Injuries Association, of which he is a member. He later underwent a series of surgical procedures to correct the damage to the bones in his face.

Despite the accident, he continued with his interest in aviation. He talked about the accident to the July 2010 edition of Flaps Podcast, where he recounted his accident and its aftermath. He has since become a glider pilot at the Midland Gliding Club in Shropshire. He holds a pilot's licence and spoke for British gliding in the House of Commons.

Öpik also rides motorcycles (he was the chair of the all-party parliamentary motorcycling group when he was an MP), and since November 2013, he has been employed as the campaigns and communications director for the Motorcycle Action Group. Öpik supports the English football club Leicester City. His mother lives in the city of Leicester.

He participated in a celebrity edition of The Apprentice to raise money for charity. Sport Relief Does The Apprentice was part of Sport Relief, the Comic Relief/BBC charity initiative that aired on 12 and 14 March 2008. In 2006 he became president of the Motor Neurone Disease Association, following his father's death from the disease the previous year.

He and ITV weather presenter Siân Lloyd appeared on Celebrity Who Wants To Be A Millionaire? on 15 April 2006, winning £64,000 for the Motor Neurone Disease Association and Action for Children. The couple came close to marrying, but she ended the relationship in October 2006 and made unflattering comments about Öpik in her autobiography, A Funny Kind of Love. According to Lynn Barber, the author's "main purpose seems to have been demolishing love-rat Lembit".

Öpik later became involved with then-24-year-old Gabriela Irimia of pop music double-act The Cheeky Girls. They split up in July 2008 after a "difficult period" in the relationship.

At the age of 52 he had a daughter, born in June 2017, with his partner Sabina Vankova. Later that year his partner was reported to have left him but the couple had a second daughter in November 2020.

== Electoral record ==
2 September 2011 primary, for Liberal Democrat candidate for 2012 London mayoral election: 1st round
Party	Candidate	Votes	%
Liberal Democrats	Brian Paddick	1,289	41.7%
Liberal Democrats	Mike Tuffrey	1,232	39.9%
Liberal Democrats	Brian Haley	316	10.2%
Liberal Democrats	Lembit Öpik	252	8.2%
Turnout		3,089	

General election 2010: Montgomeryshire
Party	Candidate	Votes	%	±%
Conservative	Glyn Davies	13,976	41.3	+13.8
Liberal Democrats	Lembit Öpik	12,792	37.8	−12.5
Plaid Cymru	Heledd Fychan	2,802	8.3	+1.3
Labour	Nick Colbourne	2,407	7.1	−5.2
UKIP	David W. L. Rowlands	1,128	3.3	+0.4
National Front	Milton Ellis	384	1.1	N/A
Independent	Bruce Lawson	324	1.0	N/A
Majority		1,184	3.5	N/A
Turnout		33,813	69.4	+3.1
Registered electors		48,730		
Conservative gain from Liberal Democrats		Swing	+13.2	

General election 2005: Montgomeryshire
Party	Candidate	Votes	%	±%
Liberal Democrats	Lembit Öpik	15,419	51.2	+1.8
Conservative	Simon Baynes	8,246	27.4	−0.5
Labour	David Tinline	3,454	11.5	−0.4
Plaid Cymru	Ellen ap Gwynn	2,078	6.9	+0.1
UKIP	Clive Easton	900	3.0	+0.3
Majority		7,173	23.8	+2.3
Turnout		30,097	64.4	−1.1
Registered electors		46,766		
Liberal Democrats hold		Swing	+1.2	

General election 2001: Montgomeryshire
Party	Candidate	Votes	%	±%
Liberal Democrats	Lembit Öpik	14,319	49.4	+3.5
Conservative	David Jones	8,085	27.9	+1.8
Labour	Paul Davies	3,443	11.9	−7.3
Plaid Cymru	David Senior	1,969	6.8	+1.8
UKIP	David Rowlands	786	2.7	N/A
ProLife Alliance	Ruth Davies	210	0.7	N/A
Independent	Reginald Taylor	171	0.6	N/A
Majority		6,234	21.5	+1.7
Turnout		28,983	65.5	−9.2
Registered electors		62,200		
Liberal Democrats hold		Swing	+0.9	

General election 1997: Montgomeryshire
Party	Candidate	Votes	%	±%
Liberal Democrats	Lembit Öpik	14,647	45.9	−2.6
Conservative	Glyn Davies	8,344	26.1	−6.6
Labour	Angharad Davies	6,109	19.1	+6.7
Plaid Cymru	Helen Mary Jones	1,608	5.0	+0.3
Referendum	John Bufton	879	2.8	N/A
Green	Susan Walker	338	1.1	−0.4
Majority		6,303	19.7	+3.9
Turnout		31,925	74.7	−5.0
Registered electors		60,873		
Liberal Democrats hold		Swing	+2.0	

General election 1992: Newcastle upon Tyne Central
Party	Candidate	Votes	%	±%
Labour	Jim Cousins	21,123	49.4	+5.2
Conservative	Mike Summersby	15,835	37.0	−1.8
Liberal Democrats	Lembit Öpik	5,816	13.6	−2.2
Majority		5,288	12.4	+7.0
Turnout		42,774	71.3	−4.2
Labour hold		Swing	+3.5	

Parliament of the United Kingdom
Preceded by Alex Carlile	Member of Parliament for Montgomeryshire; 1997–2010	Succeeded by Glyn Davies
Party political offices
Preceded by Richard Livsey	Leader of the Welsh Liberal Democrats; 2001–2007	Succeeded by Mike German
