= Hardship payments in the United Kingdom =

Hardship payments in the United Kingdom are welfare payments that may be claimed when a person's social security benefits are sanctioned. Under Universal Credit, hardship payments are recoverable.
