= Jenny Randerson, Baroness Randerson =

British politician (1948–2025)

The Right Honourable The Baroness Randerson
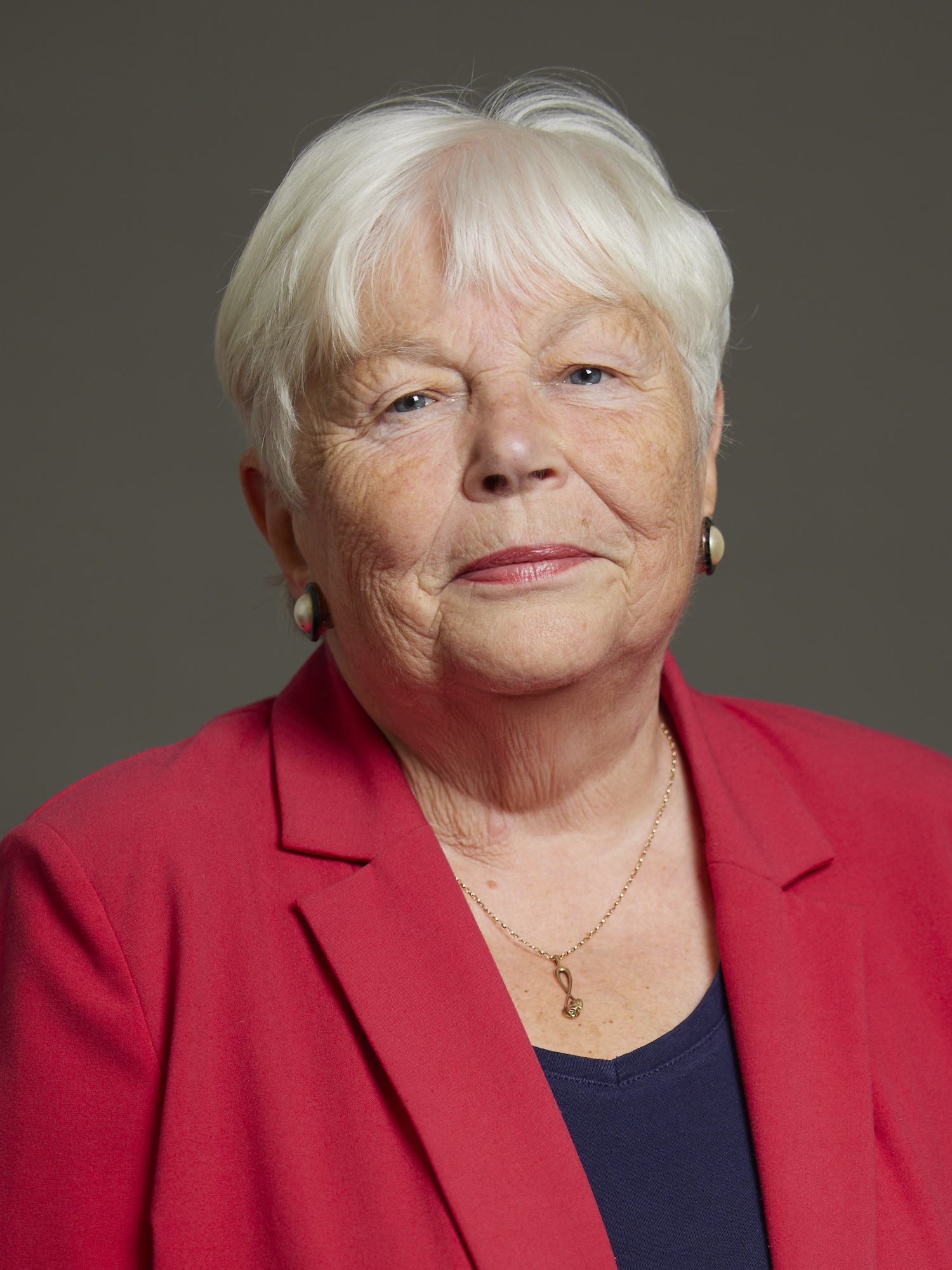
- Official portrait, 2023

Parliamentary Under-Secretary of State for Wales
- In office 5 September 2012 – 8 May 2015
- Prime Minister: David Cameron
- Sec. of State: David Jones; Stephen Crabb
- Preceded by: David Jones
- Succeeded by: Nick Bourne

Deputy First Minister of Wales
- Acting; 6 July 2001 – 13 June 2002
- First Minister: Rhodri Morgan
- Preceded by: Michael German
- Succeeded by: Michael German

Minister for Culture, Sport and the Welsh Language
- In office 17 October 2000 – 30 April 2003
- First Minister: Rhodri Morgan
- Preceded by: New post
- Succeeded by: Alun Pugh

Member of the Welsh Assembly for Cardiff Central
- In office 6 May 1999 – 5 May 2011
- Preceded by: New Assembly
- Succeeded by: Jenny Rathbone

Member of the House of Lords
- Lord Temporal
- Life peerage 27 January 2011 – 4 January 2025

Personal details
- Born: 26 May 1948 London, England
- Died: 4 January 2025 (aged 76) Cardiff, Wales
- Party: Liberal Democrats; Liberal (before 1988)
- Spouse: Peter Randerson
- Education: Bedford College, London

Jennifer Elizabeth Randerson, Baroness Randerson (26 May 1948 – 4 January 2025) was a Welsh Liberal Democrat member of the House of Lords. She was a junior minister in the Wales Office serving in the Cameron–Clegg coalition. Prior to her peerage she was an Assembly Member for Cardiff Central from 1999 to 2011 when she served in the Welsh Labour-Lib Dem administration of the 2000–2003 Welsh Assembly Government.

Randerson was also a Cardiff councillor for Cyncoed. In 2019 she was appointed Chancellor of Cardiff University.

== Early life and education ==
Randerson was educated at Bedford College, University of London (BA History), now part of Royal Holloway, University of London.

== Career ==
=== Early career ===
Randerson was a councillor for Cardiff from 1983 to 2000, and led the official opposition on the Council in Cardiff for four years.

She was also a lecturer at Cardiff Tertiary College.

She introduced "Creative Future: Cymru Creadigol", a culture strategy for Wales, and "Iaith Pawb", a strategy for the promulgation of the Welsh language.

=== National Assembly for Wales ===
Randerson was elected as Assembly Member for Cardiff Central at the 1999 Assembly Elections beating the Labour candidate Mark Drakeford. She served as Minister for Culture, Sport and the Welsh Language in the Liberal Democrat/Labour Partnership Government from 2000 to 2003. She was acting Welsh Deputy First Minister from 6 July 2001 to 13 June 2002. She was Health and Social Services; Equal Opportunities and Finance Spokeswoman for the Welsh Liberal Democrats during the Second Assembly. She chaired Assembly Business and Standing Orders Committees during the Second Assembly.

Randerson stood for the leadership of the Welsh Liberal Democrats in 2008 but was defeated by Kirsty Williams who gained 60% to Randerson's 40% of the all member ballot. In the third Assembly, Randerson was the Liberal Democrat spokesperson on Education, Transport and the Economy. She did not seek re-election at the 2011 Assembly elections, saying she was "hopeful of a new role combining my love of campaigning with a slightly less hectic lifestyle." Nigel Howells, her Liberal Democrat successor, was narrowly defeated by Jenny Rathbone.

=== House of Lords ===
On 27 January 2011, Randerson was created a life peer as Baroness Randerson, of Roath Park in the City of Cardiff and was introduced in the House of Lords on 31 January 2011, and sat on the Liberal Democrat benches. On 4 September 2012, she was appointed a Parliamentary under-secretary of state at the Wales Office.

Randerson was the first Welsh Liberal to hold a ministerial post since Gwilym Lloyd-George in 1945 and the first Welsh Liberal Democrat woman to hold ministerial office at Westminster.

== Recognition and other roles ==
In 2019 Randerson was appointed Chancellor of Cardiff University.

== Personal life and death ==
In the early 1970, when a teacher at Spalding High School, Lincolnshire, Randerson lived on Guys Head Road in Lutton Marsh with her 25-year-old husband Peter, who worked for Nature Conservancy. He studied salt marshes and mudflats. He worked at the Coastal Ecology Research Station in Norwich. He played the violin. Her husband was later an ecology lecturer at University of Wales College, Cardiff, in the 1990s, which became Cardiff University.

Randerson died in Cardiff on 4 January 2025, at the age of 76. Following her death, First Minister of Wales, Eluned Morgan described Randerson as "committed to public service, to Wales and devolution." Randerson's funeral was held on 10 February 2025 in the National Museum of Wales and was attended by over 400 mourners. Eulogies were delivered by Ilora Finlay, Baroness Finlay of Llandaff and former Deputy Liberal Democrat Leader Sir Simon Hughes.

== Offices held ==
Senedd
New office	Assembly Member for Cardiff Central; 1999 – 2011	Succeeded by Jenny Rathbone
Political offices
New office	Minister for Culture, Sport and the Welsh Language; 16 October 2000–2 May 2003	Succeeded by Alun Pugh
Preceded by Michael German	Deputy First Minister for Wales; 6 July 2001 – 13 June 2002 (acting)	Succeeded by Michael German
New office	Parliamentary Under Secretary of State, Wales Office; 5 September 2012 – 8 May 2015	Succeeded by Nick Bourne
Academic offices
Preceded by Martin Evans	Chancellor of Cardiff University (previously known as President); 2019–2025	Succeeded by TBD
