= Kirsty Williams =

Former Welsh Liberal Democrat politician and former Minister for Education

Kirsty Williams CBE
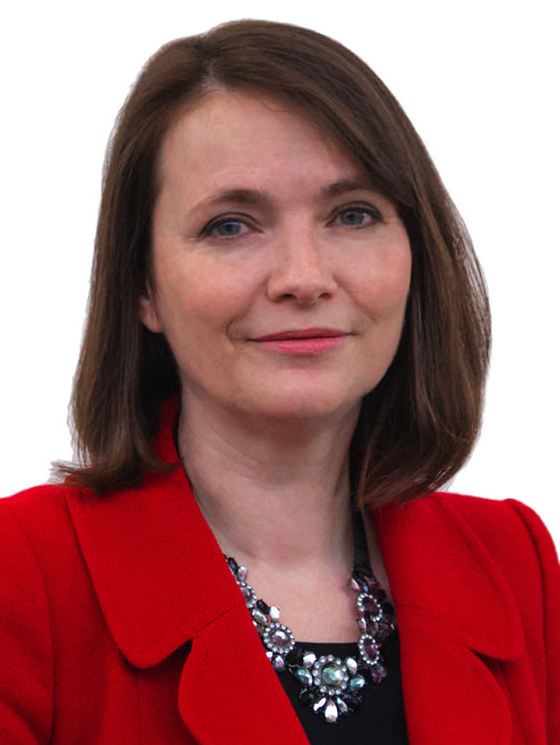
- Williams in 2016

Minister for Education (Note: Known as Cabinet Secretary for Education and Skills until 13 Dec 2018)
- In office 19 May 2016 – 13 May 2021
- First Minister: Carwyn Jones; Mark Drakeford
- Preceded by: Huw Lewis
- Succeeded by: Jeremy Miles

Leader of the Welsh Liberal Democrats
- In office 8 December 2008 – 6 May 2016
- Leader: Nick Clegg; Tim Farron
- Preceded by: Mike German
- Succeeded by: Mark Williams
- Acting; 16 June 2017 – 3 November 2017
- Leader: Tim Farron; Vince Cable
- Preceded by: Mark Williams
- Succeeded by: Jane Dodds

Liberal Democrat Spokesperson for Wales
- In office 21 August 2019 – 6 January 2020 Serving with Jane Dodds
- Preceded by: Christine Humphreys
- Succeeded by: Wendy Chamberlain
- In office 29 July 2015 – 6 May 2016
- Leader: Tim Farron
- Preceded by: The Baroness Randerson
- Succeeded by: Mark Williams

Member of the Senedd for Brecon and Radnorshire
- In office 6 May 1999 – 29 April 2021
- Preceded by: Constituency established
- Succeeded by: James Evans

Personal details
- Born: Victoria Kirstyn Williams; 19 March 1971 (age 55) Taunton, Somerset, England
- Party: Liberal Democrats
- Spouse: Richard Rees
- Children: 3
- Education: University of Manchester
- Website: www.kirstywilliams.org.uk

Victoria Kirstyn Williams CBE (born 19 March 1971) is a Welsh politician who served as Minister for Education in the Welsh Government from 2016 to 2021. She was a Member of the Senedd (MS) from 1999 to 2021. She previously served as the Leader of the Welsh Liberal Democrats from December 2008 to May 2016 and subsequently from June 2017 to November 2017 in an acting capacity.

== Early and personal life ==
Williams was born in Taunton, Somerset to Welsh parents, whilst her librarian father was working there. After moving to Liverpool, in 1974 the family moved to the village of Bynea, Carmarthenshire, where she grew up.

Educated at the independent St Michael's School, Llanelli, she then graduated from the Victoria University of Manchester with an honours degree in American studies, including a period studying at the University of Missouri. She then returned to work for the learning resources department of Carmarthenshire College in Llanelli, before taking up a post as a marketing and public relations executive for a small business in Cardiff.

She is married to a farmer; the couple have three daughters and live on the family farm outside Brecon.

== Political career ==
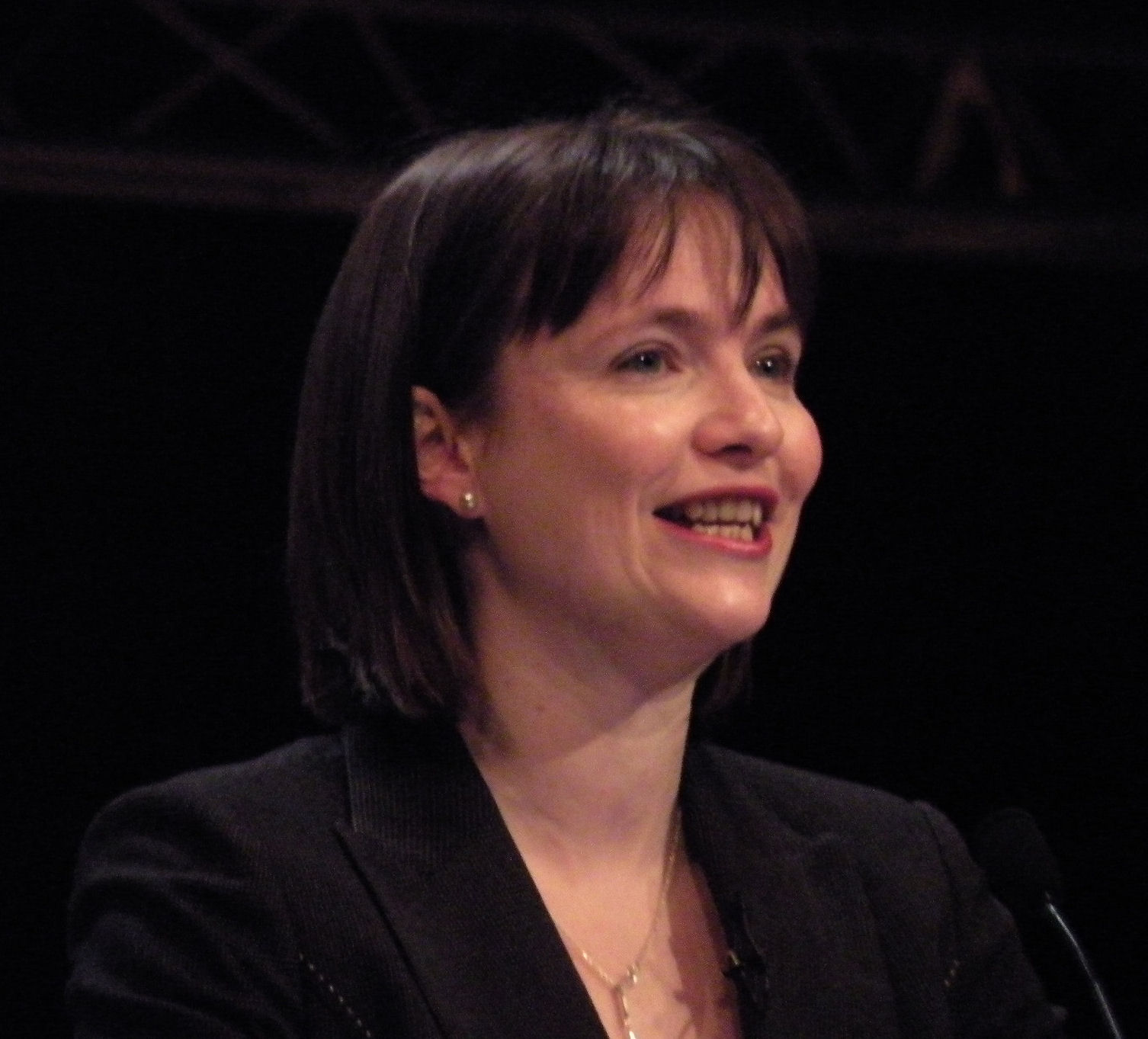
Williams addressing the Liberal Democrat Federal Conference at the Harrogate International Centre in 2009

Williams joined the Welsh Liberal Democrats at the age of 15. In the 1997 general election, she contested the constituency of Ogmore, coming third. For a long time she was a keen advocate of a Welsh Assembly, and she campaigned hard in the 1997 referendum for the creation of the National Assembly for Wales. She was subsequently appointed to the National Assembly Advisory Group by Welsh Secretary Ron Davies.

She was elected as an Assembly Member of the National Assembly for Wales for the constituency of Brecon and Radnorshire in May 1999. In her first term she became her party's health spokesman. She also served as Chair of the Welsh Assembly Health and Social Care Committee between 1999 and 2003.

In the 2006 Welsh Yearbook Political Awards, she was voted "Member to Watch 2006" In a poll at the end of 2006, Williams was voted "Sexiest Female Liberal Democrat" on Stephen Tall's Liberal Goes a Long Way blog.

On 8 December 2008, Williams became leader of the Welsh Liberal Democrats, having defeated Cardiff Central Assembly Member Jenny Randerson.

In 2011, as leader of the Welsh Liberal Democrats, she agreed to support the Welsh Labour Government's 2012–2013 £14.5bn Budget on the basis, amongst other things, of securing the Welsh Pupil Premium: an extra £20m to spend on the education of the poorest pupils. Teaching Unions welcomed the deal, with ATL Cymru director Philip Dixon saying, "Our children are our future and investment in them is investment for all. Labour and the Lib Dems deserve credit for ensuring that our children, especially those in most need, will now get a better start in life."

In 2013, Williams and the Welsh Liberal Democrats more than doubled investment for the Welsh Pupil Premium in exchange for abstaining on the Welsh government's annual budget.

Williams has gained a reputation for campaigning on health issues. In 2012, the Welsh Government agreed to take forward the Welsh Liberal Democrat idea of a Health Technology Fund to allow patients better access to innovative treatments. The following year, the Welsh Liberal Democrats achieved a further £9.5m investment into the Health Technology Fund as well as the establishment of a £50m Intermediate Care Fund to drive integration of health, social services and housing.

In December 2012, Williams won ITV Wales' Assembly Member of the Year Award in a ceremony at Cardiff's City Hall. In the Queen's Birthday Honours 2013, Williams was appointed Commander of The Most Excellent Order of the British Empire for public and political service.

Williams has been part of a long-running ‘More Nurses’ campaign for a law requiring minimum staffing levels for nurses in Welsh hospitals. Kirsty Williams was successful in a legislative ballot (a bill proposed by an individual member is rare) on 11 December 2013, and given leave to proceed with her Bill In 2014, Nurse Staffing Levels Bill. It was passed and became law in Wales on 21 March 2016. She was made an honorary fellow of the Royal College of Nursing in 2016.

In the elections to the Welsh Assembly on 5 May 2016 Williams retained her Brecon and Radnorshire seat with an increased majority. However, as the sole Liberal Democrat representative in the new Assembly, she stood down as leader of the Welsh Liberal Democrats the day after the election. On the first day of plenary she voted with the Government on the appointment of the First Minister. First Minister Carwyn Jones appointed her to the Welsh Cabinet as Education Secretary; 31 seats are needed for a majority in the Welsh Assembly, Labour had 29, so Williams joining with the Labour administration created a working majority.

On 16 June 2017, Williams once again became leader of the Welsh Liberal Democrats, on an acting basis, after the defeat of the previous leader of the Welsh Liberal Democrats, Mark Williams MP, in the 2017 general election.

She is at the forefront of curriculum reform in Wales and introduced the Curriculum and Assessment (Wales) Bill on 6 July 2020.

On 27 October 2020, she announced that she would not be seeking re-election in the 2021 Senedd election, saying that she was "looking forward to spending more time with my family and I remain committed to my role in Brecon and Radnorshire and look forward to continuing to campaign with my successor to ensure Brecon and Radnorshire returns a Welsh Liberal Democrat voice."

== Post-political career ==
Williams served as vice-chair of Powys Teaching Health Board from 2022 to 2025 and was subsequently appointed chair of Cardiff and Vale University Health Board since October 2025.

== Notes ==
Senedd
| New constituency | Member of the Senedd for Brecon and Radnorshire; 1999–2021 | Succeeded by James Evans |
Political offices
| Preceded by Huw Lewis | Cabinet Secretary for Education; 2016–2021 | Succeeded by Jeremy Miles |
Party political offices
| Preceded by Mike German | Leader of the Welsh Liberal Democrats; 2008–2016 | Succeeded by Mark Williams |
| Preceded by Mike German | Leader of the Liberal Democrats in the Senedd; 2008–present | Incumbent |
| Preceded by Mark Williams | Leader of the Welsh Liberal Democrats; Acting; 2017 | Succeeded by Jane Dodds |
