= Frontbench Team of Kirsty Williams =

- Frontbench Team of the National Assembly for Wales
- December 2008–May 2016
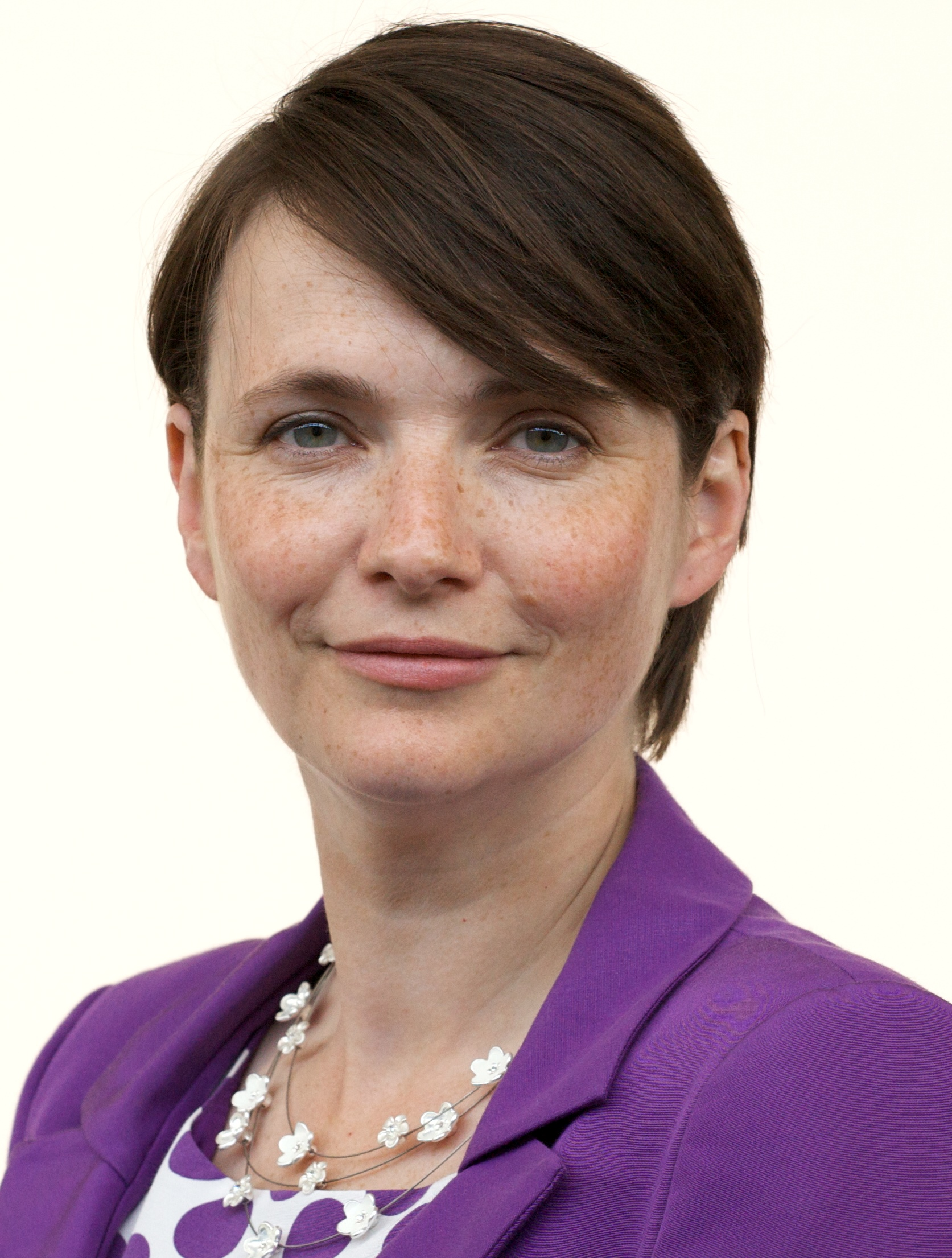
- Williams' official portrait, 2011
- Date formed: 11 December 2008
- Date dissolved: 5 May 2016

People and organisations
- Leader: Kirsty Williams
- Member party: Welsh Liberal Democrats
- Status in legislature: Opposition party 6 / 60 (10%) (2008) 5 / 60 (8%) (2011)

History
- Legislature terms: 3rd National Assembly for Wales; 4th National Assembly for Wales
- Predecessor: Second Frontbench Team of Mike German
- Successor: None (Note: Williams was the only Welsh Liberal Democrat who was returned to office at the 2016 National Assembly for Wales election and she joined the third government of Welsh Labour's Carwyn Jones later that year, remaining in government under his successor Mark Drakeford until she stepped down at the 2021 Senedd election, where Jane Dodds was the only Welsh Liberal Democrat who was elected to office.)

Kirsty Williams, the leader of the Welsh Liberal Democrats, formed her frontbench team of party spokespeople in the National Assembly for Wales on 11 December 2008 after she was elected to succeed Mike German as party leader on 8 December. She reshuffled her frontbench team after the 2011 National Assembly for Wales election before her party's seat share was reduced from five to one at the 2016 National Assembly for Wales election, with Williams becoming the party's sole assembly member (AM).

In the aftermath of the 2016 assembly election, Williams participated in the 2016 Welsh government formation as the deciding vote in the renomination of Carwyn Jones as first minister. Afterwards, Jones brought Williams into his third government. She also served under his successor Mark Drakeford before standing down at the 2021 Senedd election, (Note: In 2020, the National Assembly for Wales was renamed as the Senedd Cymru or Welsh Parliament, more generally known as the Senedd.) where her party once again returned a single seat in the legislature, this time with Jane Dodds as the only Welsh Liberal Democrat elected into office.

== Background ==
Kirsty Williams was elected to the National Assembly for Wales at the 1999 National Assembly for Wales election. She was a member of Mike German's first and second frontbench teams of party spokespeople in the assembly. After German announced his resignation in 2008, Williams stood in the leadership election to succeed him as leader of the Welsh Liberal Democrats. She defeated the runner-up Jenny Randerson in the election and became the new leader of the party. At the time of her election, Williams was the first woman to lead a political party in Wales. Her party had six assembly members (AMs) in the National Assembly at the time of her election.

== History ==
Williams formed her frontbench team of party spokespeople on 11 December 2008. Her leadership rival Jenny Randerson was made the spokesperson for the economy and transport and the spokesperson for education, children, lifelong learning and skills. Peter Black was appointed as the group's business manager and as its spokesperson for health and local government. Other appointments to the frontbench included Eleanor Burnham as spokesperson for communities, culture and equality and Mick Bates as spokesperson for environment, sustainability and rural affairs. Commenting on her frontbench team, Williams said she appointed Randerson to the economy portfolio as the "economy is the number one issue in politics today".

On 8 February 2010, Bates was dismissed from the frontbench after he was accused of assault and put under a police investigation over an alleged incident on 20 January 2010. A mini-reshuffle followed, with former leader of the Welsh Liberal Democrats Mike German appointed to replace Bates in the frontbench team, taking on his portfolio in the environment, sustainability and rural affairs. Bates had already announced his intention to retire from the assembly at the 2011 National Assembly for Wales election in the previous year. German left the assembly in May 2010 to take up a seat in the House of Lords, with his seat in the assembly being taken by his wife the Welsh Liberal Democrat politician Veronica German. A reshuffle followed on 24 July 2010, with Williams becoming spokesperson for environment and rural affairs and appointing Veronica German as spokesperson for health, local government and equal opportunities. Peter Black remained business manager but became spokesperson for housing and finance. Other appointments included Eleanor Burnham as spokesperson for communities, culture, social justice and European affairs and Jenny Randerson as spokesperson for the economy and education.

At the assembly election in May 2011, the Welsh Liberal Democrats' share of seats was reduced from six to five. On 11 July 2011, Williams reshuffled the party's frontbench team in the assembly. All five Liberal Democrat AMs were given portfolios. Williams appointed herself as spokesperson for health and social care. Peter Black was appointed as spokesperson for local government, heritage, housing and finance and remained business manager. Newly elected AMs Elunded Parrott, Aled Roberts and William Powell were made spokesperson for enterprise, transport, Europe and business, spokesperson for children, education and the Welsh language, and spokesperson for environment, sustainability and rural affairs respectively.

At the 2016 National Assembly for Wales election in May 2016 the Welsh Liberal Democrats lost four of its five seats, with Williams being the only Welsh Liberal Democrat who was returned to office at the election. In the aftermath of the election, Williams held the deciding vote in the assembly vote to nominate a first minister during the 2016 Welsh government formation. The incumbent first minister Carwyn Jones of the Labour Party put himself forward for renomination but this was challenged by the nomination of Plaid Cymru leader Leanne Wood, which was supported by the Welsh Conservatives and the UK independence Party. Williams voted for Jones' renomination as first minister, producing an overall tie, which secured him with enough time to negotiate a deal with Plaid to win a second vote and secure another term in office, thereby preventing the fall of his Labour government. On 19 May 2016, Jones formed a new cabinet and appointed Williams as the new cabinet secretary for education and skills. She remained in the government under his successor Mark Drakeford with her post retitled to minister for education. Williams stood down at the 2021 Senedd election with her party once again returning a single seat in the legislature, this time with Jane Dodds as the only Welsh Liberal Democrat elected into office.

== Members ==
=== December 2008–July 2010 ===
Portfolio	Spokesperson	Constituency	Term
Leader of the Welsh Liberal Democrats	Kirsty Williams AM	Brecon and Radnorshire	December 2008–May 2016
Welsh Liberal Democrat Group Business Manager	Peter Black AM	South Wales West	December 2008–May 2016
Spokesperson for Health and Local Government	Peter Black AM	South Wales West	December 2008–July 2010
Spokesperson for the Economy and Transport; Spokesperson for Education, Children, Lifelong Learning & Skills	Jenny Randerson AM	Cardiff Central	December 2008–July 2010
Spokesperson for Communities, Culture and Equality	Eleanor Burnham AM	North Wales	December 2008–July 2010
Spokesperson for Environment, Sustainability and Rural Affairs	Mick Bates AM	Montgomeryshire	December 2008–February 2010
Spokesperson for Environment, Sustainability and Rural Affairs	Mike German AM	South Wales East	February 2010–July 2010

==== Changes ====
- In February 2010, Mick Bates was dismissed from the frontbench after he was accused of assault. Former leader Mike German rejoined the frontbench and took over his portfolio in the environment, sustainability and rural affairs.

=== July 2010–May 2011 ===
Portfolio	Spokesperson	Constituency	Term
Leader of the Welsh Liberal Democrats	Kirsty Williams AM	Brecon and Radnorshire	December 2008–May 2016
Spokesperson for Environment and Rural Affairs	Kirsty Williams AM	Brecon and Radnorshire	July 2010–May 2011
Welsh Liberal Democrat Group Business Manager	Peter Black AM	South Wales West	December 2008–May 2016
Spokesperson for Housing and Finance	Peter Black AM	South Wales West	July 2010–May 2011
Spokesperson for the Economy and Education	Jenny Randerson AM	Cardiff Central	July 2010–May 2011
Spokesperson for Communities, Culture, Social Justice and European affairs	Eleanor Burnham AM	North Wales	July 2010–May 2011
Spokesperson for Health, Local Government and Equal Opportunities	Veronica German AM	South Wales East	July 2010–May 2011

=== July 2011–May 2016 ===
Portfolio	Spokesperson	Constituency	Term
Leader of the Welsh Liberal Democrats	Kirsty Williams AM	Brecon and Radnorshire	December 2008–May 2016
Spokesperson for Health and Social Care	Kirsty Williams AM	Brecon and Radnorshire	July 2011–May 2016
Welsh Liberal Democrat Group Business Manager	Peter Black AM	South Wales West	December 2008–May 2016
Spokesperson for Local Government, Heritage, Housing and Finance	Peter Black AM	South Wales West	July 2011–May 2016
Spokesperson for Enterprise, Transport, Europe and Business	Eluned Parrott AM	South Wales Central	July 2011–May 2016
Spokesperson for Children, Education and the Welsh Language	Aled Roberts AM	North Wales	July 2011–May 2016
Spokesperson for Environment, Sustainability and Rural Affairs	William Powell AM	Mid and West Wales	July 2011–May 2016

== See also ==
- Frontbench Team of Rhun ap Iorwerth
