= Senedd Commission =

Corporate body for the Senedd

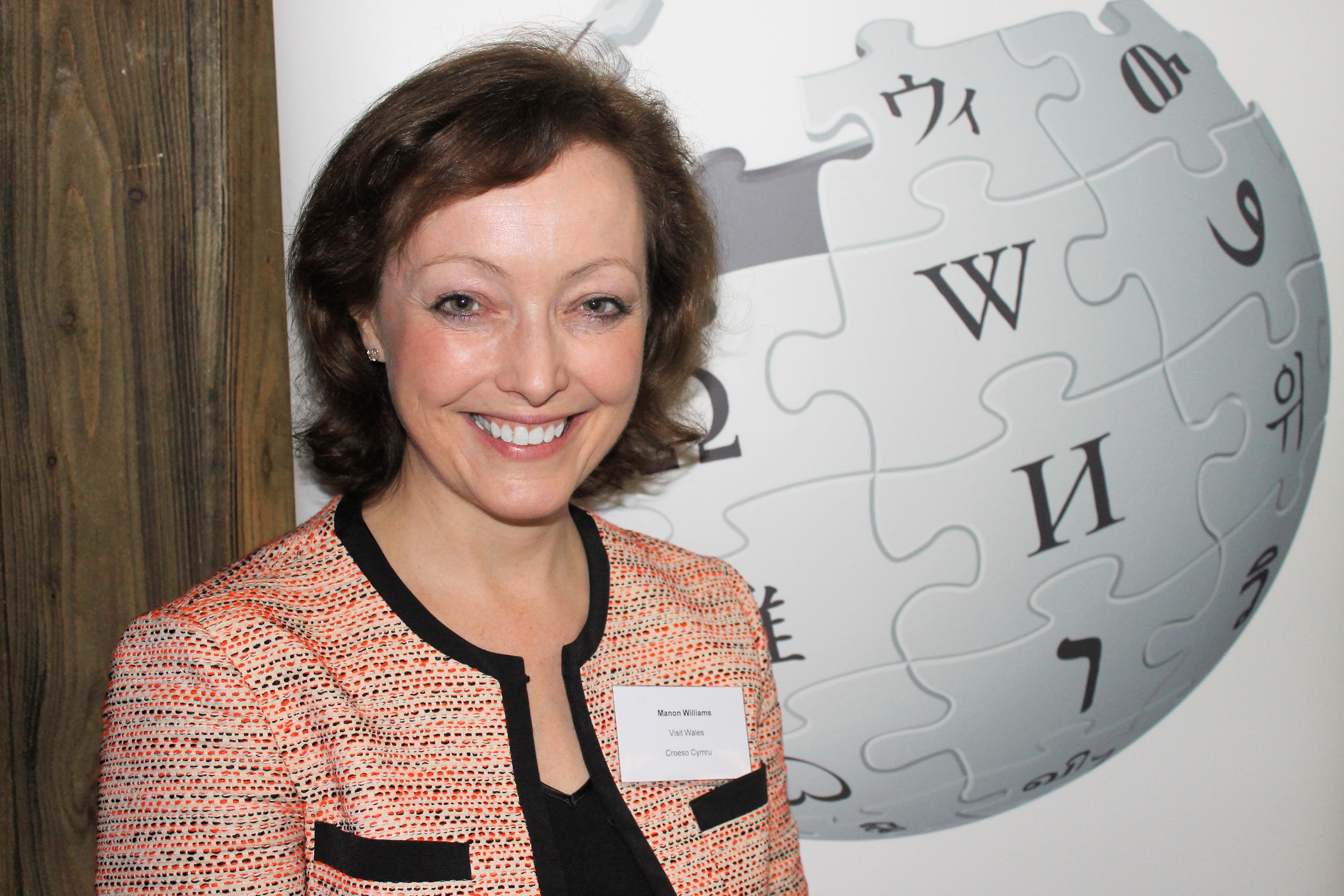
Manon Antoniazzi, the chief executive and clerk of the Senedd

The Senedd Commission (Welsh: Comisiwn y Senedd) serves as the corporate entity for the Senedd of Wales. It is tasked with the responsibility of providing property, staff, and services to the Senedd. Composed of the Llywydd of the Senedd and four members representing various political parties, each with distinct areas of responsibility, the commission operates with the support of staff from the Commission and Support Service. Before 2020, this body was referred to as the National Assembly for Wales Commission.

== Role of the commission ==
The Government of Wales Act 2006 provided the National Assembly for Wales with significant new powers to legislate, and strengthens its scrutiny role. It also creates a legally separate Welsh Government and a corporate body, known as the National Assembly for Wales Commission (Assembly Commission) which has responsibility for the provision of property, staff and services to support the assembly members. The commission consists of the presiding officer and four other members nominated by the main political parties. The staff of the commission are employees of the commission and are headed by the chief executive and clerk of the Senedd.

The commission's duty, as defined in the Government of Wales Act 2006, is to provide the “property, staff and services required for the Senedd's purposes”. In practice, this means that it is the commission's responsibility to:

- acquire, hold or dispose of any property on behalf of the Senedd;
- make arrangements to pay Members and provide their pensions and allowances and to employ Senedd staff; and
- act in an appropriate and necessary way to provide the services required for the Senedd to do its work.

Schedule 2 of the Government of Wales Act 2006 allows the commission to promote public awareness of the current or future electoral system for the Senedd. It also empowers the commission to promote public awareness of the current or any pending system of devolved government in Wales. The act allows this to take place via the use of education or information programmes and by making grants available to other bodies or persons to carry out such programmes.

After each financial year, the Senedd Commission must publish an annual report. This report must outline how the commission has fulfilled its role and exercised its functions during the financial year, and must be laid before the Senedd. The commission is also required to produce annual accounts for audit by the auditor general for Wales.

== The commission ==
The Senedd Commission consists of the Llywydd, plus four other members of the Senedd, one nominated by each of the four party groups represented by the Senedd. The commissioners are Peredur Owen Griffiths (Plaid Cymru), Laura Anne Jones (Reform UK), Vikki Howells (Welsh Labour) and Andrew RT Davies (Welsh Conservatives).

The role of the commission is to set strategic aims and objectives and consider performance, agree standards and values, oversee change, encourage innovation and enterprise for the Senedd.

To help achieve these aims, the commissioners have special responsibility for certain aspects of the Senedd's work. This allows a great deal of work to take place outside of formal commission meetings and positive working relationships to be developed with staff.

Their role is to ensure that the Senedd has enough resources (both in terms of staff and infrastructure) to work effectively. The commissioners are also responsible for overseeing Senedd Members’ pay and allowances.

The Senedd Commission has further responsibilities to promote public awareness of the devolved government in Wales as well as the current and future electoral system.

=== Commission for the Third Assembly (2007–2011) ===
Name	Picture	Entered office	Left office	Political party	Other
Dafydd Elis-Thomas AM		July 9, 2007	May 2011	Llywydd	Chair (as Llywydd (presiding officer) of the Third Assembly) had responsibility for encouraging the people of Wales to engage in the democratic process, encouraging effective leadership within the Assembly, developing the future legislative powers of the Assembly and promoting effective engagement with external stakeholders.
William Graham AM		June 9, 2007	May 2011	Conservative Party	(Commissioner for Assembly Resources) covered the management of National Assembly assets and staff (including employees, contractors and services provided to support Assembly Members’ support staff). He was also responsible for overseeing Assembly Members’ salaries and allowances as well as ensuring the Assembly conformed to the principles of efficiency and good governance.
Lorraine Barrett AM		June 9, 2007	May 2011	Labour	(Commissioner for the Sustainable Assembly) had responsibility for ensuring the National Assembly conformed to and exceeded its policies on equality and accessibility. She also had special responsibility for ensuring the National Assembly and its buildings conform to principles of sustainability.
Peter Black AM		June 9, 2007	May 2016	Liberal Democrats	(Commissioner for the Assembly and the Citizen) was responsible for ensuring the Assembly is effective when it undertakes its core roles of holding the Welsh government to account and making laws for Wales. In addition, he oversaw effective external communication initiatives, which included educating people about the Assembly’s role, the provision of effective information and communication technology for the Assembly and lawfulness.
Elin Jones AM		June 9, 2007	September 18, 2007	Plaid Cymru	Left when appointed Government Minister, replaced by Chris Franks.
Chris Franks AM		September 18, 2007	May 2011	Plaid Cymru	(Commissioner for the Improving Assembly) had responsibility for the continuous improvement of services to Assembly Members and the people of Wales, as well as strategic planning and ensuring the Assembly delivers value for money. He also worked with National Assembly staff to involve stakeholders in the democratic process.

=== Commission for the Fourth Assembly (2011–2016) ===
Name	Picture	Entered office	Left office	Political party	Other
Rosemary Butler AM		May 2011	May 2016	Llywydd	Chair (as Llywydd (presiding officer) of the Fourth Assembly)
Sandy Mewies AM		May 2011	May 2016	Labour	Fourth Assembly
Angela Burns AM		May 2011	May 2016	Conservative Party	Fourth Assembly
Rhodri Glyn Thomas AM		May 2011	May 2016	Plaid Cymru	Fourth Assembly
Peter Black AM		June 9, 2007	May 2016	Liberal Democrats	Fourth Assembly

=== Commission for the Fifth Assembly / Senedd (2016–2021) ===
Name	Picture	Entered office	Left office	Political party	Specific role
Elin Jones MS		May 2016	May 2021	Llywydd	Commission chair (as Llywydd (presiding officer) of the Fifth Assembly), Communications and engagement
Joyce Watson MS		8 June 2016	May 2021	Labour	Equalities, and the commission as the employer of Assembly staff.
Suzy Davies MS		8 June 2016	May 2021	Conservative Party	Budget and governance, including Audit and Risk Assurance Committee membership.
Dai Lloyd AM		8 June 2016	21 Sept 2016	Plaid Cymru	Official languages, and delivery and transformation of services to Members.
Adam Price AM		21 Sept 2016	21 Nov 2018	Plaid Cymru	Official languages, and delivery and transformation of services to Members.
Siân Gwenllian MS		21 Nov 2018	28 January 2020	Plaid Cymru	Official languages, and delivery and transformation of services to Members.
Rhun ap Iorwerth MS		28 January 2020	May 2021	Plaid Cymru	Official languages, and delivery and transformation of services to Members.
Caroline Jones AM		8 June 2016	2018	UKIP	Security and Assembly resources.
David Rowlands MS		14 Nov 2018	May 2021	UKIP	Security and Assembly resources.
David Rowlands MS		14 Nov 2018	May 2021	Brexit Party	Security and Assembly resources.

=== Commission for the Sixth Senedd (2021-2026) ===
Name	Picture	Entered office	Left office	Political party	Specific role
Elin Jones MS		12 May 2021	May 2026	Llywydd	Commission chair (as Llywydd (presiding officer) of the Sixth Senedd) and communications.
Joyce Watson MS		23 June 2021	May 2026	Labour	Equalities.
Ken Skates MS		23 June 2021	15 April 2024^{a}	Labour	Budget and governance.
Hefin David MS		17 April 2024	12 August 2025^{b}	Labour	Budget and governance.
Lesley Griffiths MS		1 October 2025	May 2026	Labour	Budget and governance.
Janet Finch-Saunders MS		23 June 2021	May 2026	Conservative Party	Sustainable development.
Rhun ap Iorwerth MS		23 June 2021	19 June 2023^{c}	Plaid Cymru	Official languages.
Adam Price MS		4 July 2023	May 2026	Plaid Cymru	Official languages.

^{a}Date he joined the Welsh Government
^{b}Date he died
^{c}Date he became leader of Plaid Cymru

=== Commission for the Seventh Senedd (since 2026) ===
Name	Picture	Entered office	Left office	Political party	Specific role
Huw Irranca-Davies MS		May 2026	present	Llywydd	Commission chair (as Llywydd (presiding officer) of the Seventh Senedd).
Peredur Owen Griffiths MS		2 June 2026	present	Plaid Cymru	TBC
Laura Anne Jones MS		2 June 2026	present	Reform UK	TBC
Vikki Howells MS		2 June 2026	present	Labour	TBC
Andrew RT Davies MS		2 June 2026	present	Conservatives	TBC

== Membership ==
The Government of Wales Act 2006 maintains that membership of the Senedd Commission will include the presiding officer and four other Senedd members. Standing Order 3.3 sets out the arrangement for the appointment of the four other Senedd Members, and states that there will not be more than one member (other than the presiding officer) from the same political group.

== Policies ==
A number of documents were approved by the Shadow Commission with the intention that they should be implemented as soon as is possible after the establishment of the Assembly Commission following the May 2007 elections.

The policies, which are currently under development, are:

- Statement of Practices and Procedures for the Assembly Commission
- Equality of Opportunity
- Sustainable Development Policy
- Health and Safety Policy
- Welsh Language Scheme
- Corporate Governance Framework
- Financial Standards
- Staff Code of Conduct
- Public Interest Disclosure Policy
- Records Management policy
- Freedom of Information Publication Scheme
- Procurement Policy
- Risk Management Strategy
- IT Security Policy
- Business Continuity Plan

== Chief Executive and Clerk of the Senedd ==
The most senior civil servant within the Assembly was known as the Clerk to the Assembly until 2007 when the post was expanded and renamed as Chief Executive and Clerk to the Assembly. It was renamed the chief executive and clerk of the Senedd after the changes to the name of the legislature.

The post was created to reflect the growing powers of the Assembly following the Government of Wales Act 2006. From May 2007, the chief executive and clerk will lead an organisation independent of the Welsh Assembly Government. They are responsible for ensuring that the Assembly is provided with the property, staff and services that it requires and to help develop an Assembly that inspires confidence and has a reputation within Wales and beyond for accessible and efficient democracy.

- John Lloyd, (1999 to 2001)
- Paul Silk, (2001 to April 2007)
- Claire Clancy, (February 2007 – April 2017).
- Manon Antoniazzi, (April 2017 – present)

== See also ==
- House of Commons Commission
- House of Lords Commission
- Scottish Parliamentary Corporate Body
- Northern Ireland Assembly Commission
