= Clerk (legislature) =

Senior administrative officer in a legislature

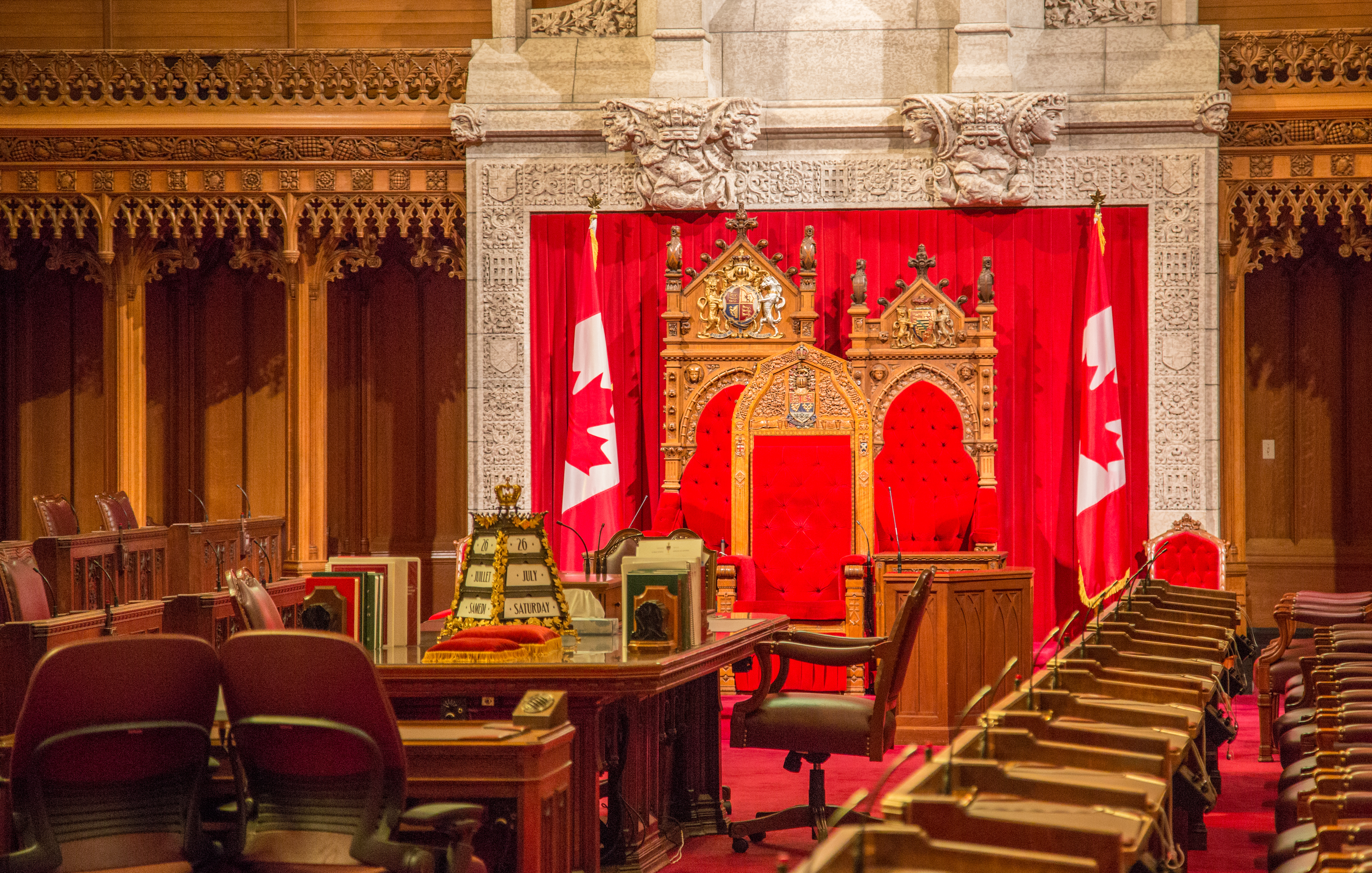
In Commonwealth countries, senior clerks will often sit on a table in-front of the presiding officer, and are accordingly known as the clerks at the table

The clerk, chief clerk, secretary, or secretary general (British English: /klɑːrk/; American English: /klɜːrk/) of a legislative chamber is the senior administrative officer responsible for ensuring that its business runs smoothly. This may encompass keeping custody of documents lain before the house, received, or produced; making records of proceedings; allocating office space; enrolling of members, and administering an oath of office. During the first sitting of a newly elected legislature, or when the current presiding officer steps down, they may preside over an election of a new presiding officer. The clerk sometimes has a ceremonial role. A clerk may also advise the speaker or members on parliamentary procedure, acting in American parlance as a "parliamentarian".

In the English speaking world, a parliamentary, legislative or congressional clerk is often used to refer to other officials who are involved with procedural operations within a legislature, and usually assist the clerk of the House in fulfilling their duties. The expression clerking can be used to describe working with the procedural aspects of a legislative assembly.

== Appointment ==
In the Westminster system, the clerk is usually an apolitical civil servant, (Note: In some jurisdictions this may be an erroneous description. In the United Kingdom they are known as parliamentary servants, as they serve Parliament, rather than the Crown and its Government.) and typically attains the position through promotion and retains it until retirement. In the UK, the clerks of both houses are appointed by letters patent from the Sovereign. Junior clerks may be appointed by the clerk of the House or by the presiding officer, and may have to be confirmed by the members. (Note: For instance, the Clerk of the Parliaments Act 1824 provides that the clerk assistant and other clerks officiating at the table of the House of Lords are nominated and appointed by the Lord Speaker subject to the approval of the House, and other clerks are appointed directly by the clerk of the Parliaments.)

In the United States, while clerks are usually nonpartisan, they are often elected by the assembly members at the beginning of each term. At the federal level, and typically at state level, the lower house has a "(chief) clerk" while the upper house has a "secretary".

== Clerks of the House by legislature ==
=== Commonwealth ===
Legislature	Clerk of sole or lower house	Clerk of upper house	Notes
Parliament of Australia	Clerk	Clerk	
— Australian Capital Territory Legislative Assembly	Clerk	N/A	Unicameral. Federal territory of Australia.
— Parliament of New South Wales	Clerk	Clerk	The clerk of the Legislative Council is formally known as the clerk of the Parliaments and clerk of the Legislative Council.
— Northern Territory Legislative Assembly	Clerk	N/A	Unicameral. Federal territory of Australia.
— Parliament of Queensland	Clerk	N/A	Unicameral.
— Parliament of South Australia	Clerk	Clerk	
— Parliament of Tasmania	Clerk	Clerk	
— (Victoria (state)) Parliament of Victoria	Clerk	Clerk	
— Parliament of Western Australia	Clerk	Clerk	The clerk of the Legislative Council is formally known as the clerk of the Legislative Council and clerk of the Parliaments.
Parliament of Canada	Clerk	Clerk	The clerk of the Senate is formally known as the clerk of the Senate and clerk of the Parliaments.
— Legislative Assembly of Alberta	Clerk	N/A	Unicameral.
— Legislative Assembly of British Columbia	Clerk	N/A	Unicameral
— Legislative Assembly of Manitoba	Clerk	N/A	Unicameral
— Legislative Assembly of New Brunswick	Clerk	N/A	Unicameral
— Newfoundland and Labrador House of Assembly	Clerk	N/A	Unicameral
— Legislative Assembly of the Northwest Territories	Clerk	N/A	Unicameral
— Nova Scotia House of Assembly	Chief Clerk	N/A	Unicameral
— Nunavut Legislative Assembly	Clerk	N/A	Unicameral
— Legislative Assembly of Ontario	Clerk	N/A	Unicameral
— Legislative Assembly of Prince Edward Island	Clerk	N/A	Unicameral
— National Assembly of Quebec	Secretary General	N/A	Unicameral. The post of secretary general was formerly called greffier in French.
— Legislative Assembly of Saskatchewan	Clerk	N/A	Unicameral
— Yukon Legislative Assembly	Clerk	N/A	Unicameral
Parliament of India	Secretary General	Secretary General	
Parliament of New Zealand	Clerk	N/A	Unicameral. The Clerk of the upper house was called the clerk of the Parliaments prior to abolition.
Parliament of the United Kingdom	Clerk	Clerk	The clerk of the House of Lords is known as the clerk of the Parliaments, and the clerk of the House of Commons is formally the under-clerk of the Parliaments, but the latter title is seldom used.
— Northern Ireland Assembly	Clerk	N/A	Unicameral
— (Scotland) Scottish Parliament	Clerk	N/A	Unicameral
— (Wales) Senedd Cymru/Welsh Parliament	Clerk (Clerc)	N/A	Unicameral
— (Isle of Man) Tynwald Court	Secretary	Clerk	Bicameral, however when the Houses are sitting together they become the Tynwald Court. The clerk of Tynwald is ex-officio the secretary of the House of Keys and the chief administrative officer for the entire Court.

=== Africa ===
Legislature	Clerk of sole or lower house	Clerk of upper house	Notes
Parliament of Zimbabwe	Clerk		Bicameral, but the same Clerk serves both the National Assembly and the Senate

=== Asia ===
Legislature	Clerk of sole or lower house	Clerk of upper house	Notes
(China) National People's Congress	Secretary General	N/A	Unicameral, however the Standing Committee of the National People's Congress is a permanent body of the Congress which often acts as the national legislature.
— Legislative Council of Hong Kong	Secretary General	N/A	Unicameral
— Legislative Assembly of Macau	Secretary General	N/A	Unicameral
(Israel) Knesset	Secretary	N/A	Unicameral
Congress of the Philippines	Secretary General	Secretary	

=== Europe ===
Legislature	Clerk of sole or lower house	Clerk of upper house	Notes
National Assembly of Belarus	Director of the Secretariat	Director of the Secretariat	
(Spain) Cortes Generales	General Secretary (Secretario General)	Senior Clerk (Letrado mayor)	The general secretary of the Congress of Deputies is also ex officio senior clerk of the whole Parliament (Letrado mayor de las Cortes Generales). Both clerks are elected by the bureaus of their respective chambers, and must be civil servants from the Parliament. The regional assemblies also have this officer with the same name of senior clerk.

=== North America ===
Legislature	Clerk of sole or lower house	Clerk of upper house	Notes
(Greenland) Inatsisartut	Director	N/A	
(Mexico) Congress of the Union	Secretary General	Secretary General	
United States Congress	Clerk	Secretary	Elected every two years.
—Alabama Legislature	Clerk	Secretary	The deputy to the clerk of the House is called the chief clerk.
— Alaska Legislature	Chief Clerk	Secretary	
— Arizona State Legislature	Chief Clerk	Secretary	
— Arkansas General Assembly	Chief Clerk	Secretary	The chief clerk is appointed by the speaker and confirmed by the House by simple majority.
— California State Legislature	Chief Clerk	Secretary	Elected every two years.
— Colorado General Assembly	Chief Clerk	Secretary	
— Connecticut General Assembly	Clerk	Clerk	
— Delaware General Assembly	Chief Clerk	Secretary	
— (Washington, D.C.) Council of the District of Columbia	Secretary	N/A	Federal District. Unicameral.
— Florida Legislature	Clerk	Secretary	
— (Georgia (U.S. state)) Georgia General Assembly	Clerk	Secretary	
— Hawaii Legislature	Chief Clerk	Clerk	
— Idaho Legislature	Chief Clerk	Secretary	
— Illinois General Assembly	Clerk	Secretary	
— Iowa General Assembly	Chief Clerk	Secretary	
— Kansas Legislature	Chief Clerk	Secretary	
— Kentucky General Assembly	Chief Clerk	Chief Clerk	
— Louisiana Legislature	Clerk	Secretary	
— Maine Legislature	Clerk	Secretary	
— Maryland General Assembly	Chief Clerk	Secretary	
— Massachusetts General Court	Clerk	Clerk	
— Michigan Legislature	Clerk	Secretary	
— Minnesota Legislature	Chief Clerk	Secretary	
— Mississippi Legislature	Clerk	Secretary	
— Missouri General Assembly	Chief Clerk	Secretary	
— Montana Legislature	Chief Clerk	Secretary	
— Nebraska Legislature	Clerk	N/A	Unicameral. The current sole house was the Senate before the House of Representatives was abolished in 1936.
— Nevada Legislature	Chief Clerk	Secretary	
— New Hampshire General Court	Clerk	Clerk	
— New Jersey Legislature	Clerk	Secretary	
— New Mexico Legislature	Chief Clerk	Chief Clerk	
— (New York (state)) New York Legislature	Clerk	Secretary	
— North Carolina General Assembly	Clerk	Clerk	
— North Dakota Legislative Assembly	Chief Clerk	Secretary	
— Ohio General Assembly	Clerk	Clerk	
— Oklahoma Legislature	Chief Clerk	Secretary	
— Oregon Legislative Assembly	Chief Clerk	Secretary	
— Pennsylvania General Assembly	Chief Clerk	Secretary-Parliamentarian	The secretary-parliamentarian acts as both the chief administrative officer and parliamentarian of the Senate. The Senate also has a chief clerk, who is the chief fiscal officer, and holds other miscellaneous administrative duties.
— Legislative Assembly of Puerto Rico	Secretary	Secretary	Unincorporated territory of the United States.
— Rhode Island General Assembly	Clerk	Secretary	
— South Carolina General Assembly	Clerk	Clerk	
— South Dakota Legislature	Chief Clerk	Secretary	
— Tennessee General Assembly	Chief Clerk	Chief Clerk	
— Texas Legislature	Chief Clerk	Secretary	
— Utah State Legislature	Chief Clerk	Secretary	
— Vermont General Assembly	Clerk	Secretary	
— Virginia General Assembly	Clerk	Clerk	
— (Washington (state)) Washington State Legislature	Chief Clerk	Secretary	
— West Virginia Legislature	Clerk	Clerk	The clerk of the House is ex-officio the keeper of the Rolls of the Legislature.
— Wisconsin State Legislature	Chief Clerk	Chief Clerk	
— Wyoming State Legislature	Chief Clerk	Chief Clerk	

== Other officials ==
Other administrative and procedural officials in legislatures of English-speaking countries will often be referred to as clerks, even if their formal job title doesn't. It is noteworthy that whilst mostly similar, certain roles may have different responsibilities between the Commonwealth and United States.

Name	Notes
Clerk assistant	Sometimes used as the title for the deputy clerk of the House, such as in the UK House of Commons.
Committee clerk	Responsible for the administrative operations of a parliamentary committee, and advises the chair and members on procedural matters. The most senior committee clerk is sometimes known as the Clerk of Committees.
Journal clerk	Responsible for the upkeep of the chamber's journal and other official records such as minutes of proceedings, however the verbatim record is usually the responsibility of a separate official. The most senior journal clerk is sometimes known as the clerk of the journals.
Reading clerk	In the United States they are usually responsible for the oral reading of bills, motions, amendments and other items that the chamber may order. The Reading Clerk in the House of Lords is responsible for reading letters patents and writs of summons of newly created peers, as well as commissions granting Royal Assent, and recording daily attendance.

== See also ==
- Clerk of the Crown in Chancery
- Serjeant-at-arms
- Speaker
