= Second Frontbench Team of Mike German =

Welsh Liberal Democrats frontbench team (2003–2008)

- Frontbench Team of the National Assembly for Wales
- May 2003–December 2008
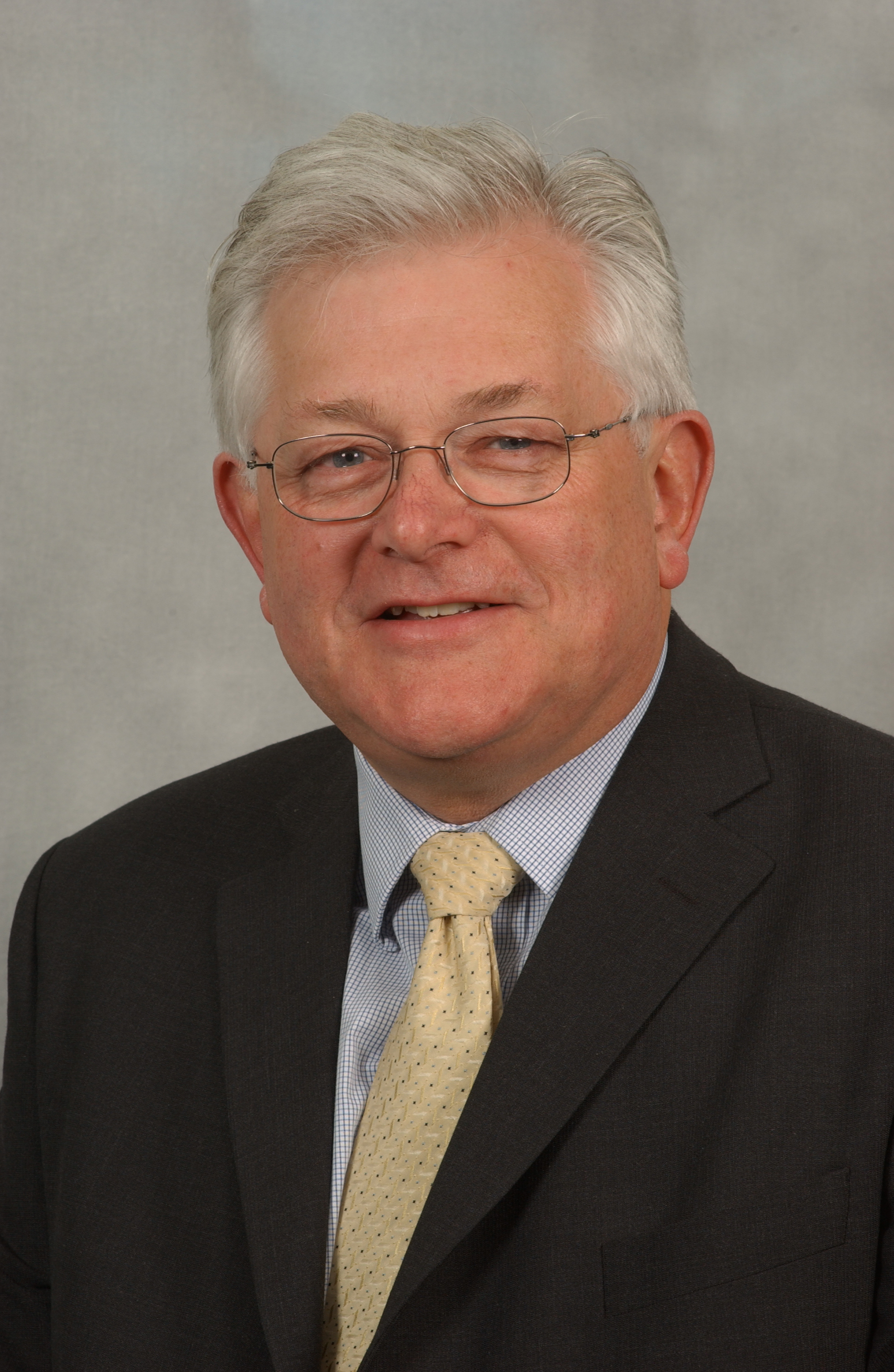
- German's official portrait, 2003
- Date formed: 8 May 2003
- Date dissolved: 8 December 2008

People and organisations
- Leader: Mike German
- Member party: Welsh Liberal Democrats
- Status in legislature: Opposition party 6 / 60 (10%)

History
- Legislature terms: 2nd National Assembly for Wales; 3rd National Assembly for Wales
- Predecessor: First Frontbench Team of Mike; German (2000) (Note: From October 2000 to May 2003, the Welsh Liberal Democrats participated in a coalition government with Welsh Labour.)
- Successor: Frontbench Team of Kirsty Williams

Mike German, the leader of the Welsh Liberal Democrat Group in the National Assembly for Wales, formed his second frontbench team of party spokespeople on 8 May 2003 after the dissolution of his party's coalition government with Rhodri Morgan's Welsh Labour following the 2003 National Assembly for Wales election. Richards had already formed a frontbench team before entering coalition, when his party became an opposition party after the 1999 National Assembly for Wales election before forming the coalition with Labour in October 2000.

German continued to serve as leader of his party's group until his resignation in 2008. A year earlier, he was elected leader of the Welsh Liberal Democrats with the group leadership unified with this office. Kirsty Williams won a leadership election to succeed him as leader in December 2008 and she formed a new frontbench team later that same month.

== Background ==
Mike German was elected leader of the Welsh Liberal Democrat Group in the National Assembly for Wales in 1998 ahead of the first assembly election in 1999. He led the party into the election, where it won six seats and returned six assembly members (AMs), a result which was repeated in the 2003 and 2007 assembly elections. At the 1999 election, German won a regional assembly seat in South Wales East, leading the Welsh Liberal Democrat Group in the assembly following its establishment later that same year. The Liberal Democrats served in opposition during the first year of the assembly, with German forming his first frontbench team on 13 May 1999. In October 2000, German negotiated a coalition deal with First Secretary Rhodri Morgan and his party formed a coalition government with Morgan's Welsh Labour.

Morgan's Labour Party made gains at the 2003 assembly election and so he decided to end the coalition with German's Liberal Democrats. As a result, the Liberal Democrats returned to opposition. Morgan formed a new cabinet for his Labour government on 8 May 2003. After the appointment of Morgan's new cabinet, the opposition parties in the assembly appointed new frontbench teams, including a reshuffled shadow cabinet for Plaid Cymru, a reshuffled frontbench team for the Welsh Conservatives and a new frontbench team for the Liberal Democrats who had just left government.

== History ==
Like the other opposition parties, German formed his frontbench team of party spokespeople after the formation of Morgan's new cabinet on 8 May 2003. All members of the Welsh Liberal Democrat Group were given a portfolio. Kirsty Williams was appointed as the group's business manager and chief whip and as its spokesperson for health and social services. Other appointments included Jenny Randerson as spokesperson for finance and spokesperson for economic development and transport, Peter Black as spokesperson for education and spokesperson for social justice, Mick Bates as spokesperson for environment, planning and the countryside, and Eleanor Burnham as spokesperson for culture, sport and Welsh language.

Following the 2007 National Assembly for Wales election and the collapse of coalition talks between the Welsh Liberal Democrats, Welsh Conservatives and Plaid Cymru, Welsh Liberal Democrat leader Lembit Öpik stood down to unify the posts of party leader and leader of the Welsh Liberal Democrat Group in the National Assembly. German stood unopposed in the leadership election to succeed him in October 2007, becoming the leader of the Welsh Liberal Democrats with his previous role as group leader merged into the office. German announced in May 2008 his intention to resign from the leadership later that year after the party's annual conference in October. A leadership election was held on 8 December 2008 to elect a successor, with Kirsty Williams defeating Jenny Randerson to become the new leader. She formed a new frontbench team later that month.

== Members ==
Portfolio	Spokesperson	Constituency	Term
Leader of the Welsh Liberal Democrats (Note: As the leader of the Welsh Liberal Democrat Group from 1999 to 2007.)	Mike German AM	South Wales East	May 1999–December 2008
Welsh Liberal Democrat Group Business Manager; Welsh Liberal Democrat Group Chief Whip; Spokesperson for Health and Social Services	Kirsty Williams AM	Brecon and Radnorshire	May 2003–December 2008
Spokesperson for Finance; Spokesperson for Economic Development and Transport	Jenny Randerson AM	Cardiff Central	May 2003–December 2008
Spokesperson for Education; Spokesperson for Social Justice	Peter Black AM	South Wales West	May 2003–December 2008
Spokesperson for Environment, Planning and the Countryside	Mick Bates AM	Montgomeryshire	May 2003–December 2008
Spokesperson for Culture, Sport and Welsh Language	Eleanor Burnham AM	North Wales	May 2003–December 2008

== See also ==
- Second Morgan government
- Shadow Cabinet of Ieuan Wyn Jones
