= Cardiff Three =

Cardiff Three may refer to:

- the three Cardiff men wrongfully convicted of the 1987 murder of newsagent Phillip Saunders
- the three Cardiff men wrongfully convicted of the 1988 murder of Lynette White
