= Houses of the Oireachtas Commission =

Governing body of the Irish parliament

The Houses of the Oireachtas Commission (Irish: Coimisiún Thithe an Oireachtais) is the governing body responsible for the administration of the Oireachtas. It was established on 1 January 2004 by the Houses of the Oireachtas Act 2003 as a corporate body. It is independent in performing its functions and has no role in setting parliamentary business. It is funded on a three-year basis. It is funded by statute on a three-year basis.

== Commission membership ==
Its membership is: the Ceann Comhairle, who is the chair of the Commission; the Cathaoirleach of the Seanad; the Clerk of the Dáil, termed the Secretary General, who acts as chief executive; a member of the Houses appointed by the Minister for Public Expenditure, Infrastructure, Public Service Reform and Digitalisation; four members of the Dáil; and three members of the Seanad. The Commission continues to exist during the dissolution period and the Ceann Comhairle continues to serve as chair of the Commission until a new Ceann Comhairle is elected by the next Dáil.

Membership as of 2025:

Party	Member	Role
Ceann Comhairle	Verona Murphy, TD	Ceann Comhairle, chairperson
Fianna Fáil	Senator Mark Daly	Cathaoirleach
	Peter Finnegan	Secretary General, Chief Executive
Fianna Fáil	Pádraig O'Sullivan, TD	Minister's representative
Fianna Fáil	Catherine Ardagh, TD	Dáil representative
Sinn Féin	Pearse Doherty, TD	Dáil representative
Fine Gael	Frank Feighan, TD	Dáil representative
Sinn Féin	Senator Robbie Gallagher	Seanad representative
Independent	Senator Michael McDowell	Seanad representative, deputy chairperson
Fine Gael	Senator Joe O'Reilly	Seanad representative
Social Democrats	Jennifer Whitmore, TD	Dáil representative

== See also ==
- Northern Ireland Assembly Commission
- House of Commons Commission – similar body in the United Kingdom
