= First Frontbench Team of Mike German =

Welsh Liberal Democrats frontbench team (1999–2000)

- Frontbench Team of the National Assembly for Wales
- May 1999–October 2000
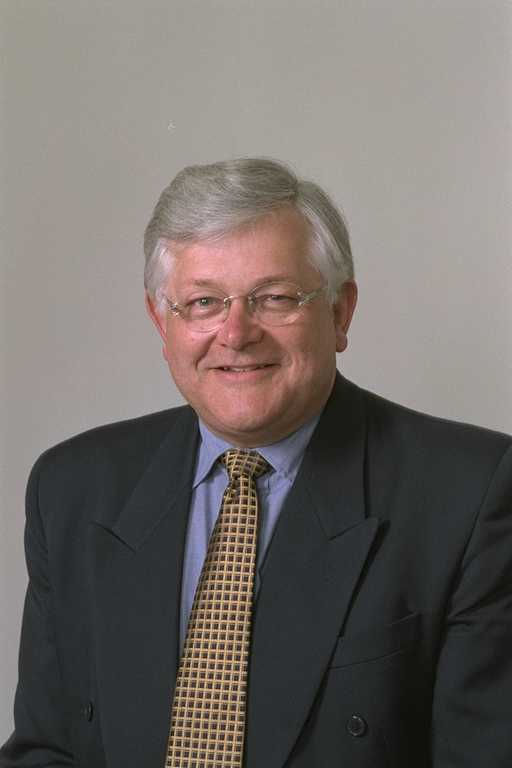
- German's official portrait, 1999
- Date formed: 13 May 1999
- Date dissolved: 16 October 2000

People and organisations
- Leader: Mike German
- Member party: Welsh Liberal Democrats
- Status in legislature: Opposition party 6 / 60 (10%)

History
- Legislature term: 1st National Assembly for Wales
- Predecessor: Assembly established
- Successor: Second Frontbench Team of Mike German (2003) (Note: From October 2000 to May 2003, the Welsh Liberal Democrats participated in a coalition government with Welsh Labour.)

Mike German, the leader of the Welsh Liberal Democrat Group in the National Assembly for Wales, formed his frontbench team of party spokespeople on 13 May 1999. German had led his party into the 1999 National Assembly for Wales election after being elected as leader of the Welsh Liberal Democrat Group in 1998. This was his first frontbench team in the assembly, with it dissolving after the party entered government in October 2000. He formed a second frontbench team after his party returned to opposition in May 2003.

German's first frontbench served through the resignation of First Secretary Alun Michael and the fall of his Labour administration. German negotiated a coalition deal with Michael's successor Rhodri Morgan in the months following his ascension to the premiership. After gaining the approval of their respective parties, German's Liberal Democrats formed a coalition government with Morgan's Labour Party, with German becoming the first deputy first minister of Wales. The coalition government was dissolved by Morgan after Labour made gains in the 2003 National Assembly for Wales election, with German's party returning to opposition and German forming a new frontbench team in May.

== History ==
German formed his frontbench team of party spokespeople on 13 May 1998, on the same day as Rod Richards's Welsh Conservatives. All six assembly members (AMs) from the Welsh Liberal Democrat Group were given frontbench roles, including German's' leadership rival Christine Humphreys, who became the group's spokesperson for education and training. German appointed himself as the group's spokesperson for economic development and European affairs. Other appointments included Jenny Randerson as its chief whip and spokesperson for education and childcare, Kirsty Williams as spokesperson for health and social services, Peter Black as spokesperson for environment, local government and planning, and Mick Bates as spokesperson for agriculture and rural economy.

On the formation of his frontbench team, German criticised Alun Michael's decision to appoint two education secretaries to his cabinet, stating that the division of responsibility for pre-16 and post-16 education policy between two different ministerial posts was "ridiculous", and that instead "we should be looking to provide education and training from cradle to work to retirement". From October to February 2000, Michael's administration faced a political crisis which resulted in his resignation after the opposition parties, including the Liberal Democrats, worked together to pass a motion of no confidence in his premiership. Rhodri Morgan was elected unopposed to succeed him as Labour leader and he was nominated by the assembly as the new first secretary shortly afterwards.

In the months that followed Morgan's ascension to the premiership, German engaged in negotiations with him to form a coalition between Labour and the Liberal Democrats. After the coalition was approved by their respective parties, a new coalition government between the parties was formed on 16 October 2000, with German becoming the first deputy first minister of Wales under Morgan, whose office was renamed to first minister. The Liberal Democrats left opposition and remained in government until May 2003, when Morgan ended the coalition after his party made gains in the 2003 National Assembly for Wales election. The Liberal Democrats returned to opposition with German forming a second frontbench team as Morgan formed his new cabinet in May.

== Members ==
Portfolio	Spokesperson	Constituency	Term
Leader of the Welsh Liberal Democrat Group	Mike German AM	South Wales East	May 1999–December 2008
Spokesperson for Economic Development and European Affairs	Mike German AM	South Wales East	May 1999–October 2000
Welsh Liberal Democrat Group Chief Whip; Spokesperson for Education and Childcare	Jenny Randerson AM	Cardiff Central	May 1999–October 2000
Spokesperson for Education and Training	Christine Humphreys AM	North Wales	May 1999–October 2000
Spokesperson for Health and Social Services	Kirsty Williams AM	Brecon and Radnorshire	May 1999–October 2000
Spokesperson for Environment, Local Government and Planning	Peter Black AM	South Wales West	May 1999–October 2000
Spokesperson for Agriculture and Rural Economy	Mick Bates AM	Montgomeryshire	May 1999–October 2000

== See also ==
- Michael administration
- Interim Morgan administration
- Shadow Cabinet of Dafydd Wigley
- Shadow Cabinet of Ieuan Wyn Jones
- Frontbench Team of Rod Richards
