= O'Brien v Chief Constable of South Wales Police =

- Court: House of Lords
- Full case name: O'Brien (Respondent) v Chief Constable of South Wales Police (Appellant)
- Decided: 28 April 2005
- Citation: [2005] UKHL 26
- Transcript: Full text of judgment

Case history
- Prior action: [2003] EWCA Civ 1085

Court membership
- Judges sitting: Lord Bingham of Cornhill, Lord Steyn, Lord Phillips of Worth Matravers, Lord Rodger of Earlsferry and Lord Carswell

Keywords
- admissible evidence; relevance; similar fact evidence; Judges' Rules

O'Brien v Chief Constable of South Wales Police [2005] UKHL 26 was an English evidence law decision of the House of Lords which held that evidence of previous bad behaviour, known as similar fact evidence, may be admitted in civil case proceedings if it is probative of a relevant matter.

== Background ==
The plaintiff in this case was Michael O'Brien, who had been wrongfully convicted of a murder in Cardiff in 1987. In addition to receiving compensation from the Home Office for the eleven years he spent in prison, O'Brien was seeking aggravated and exemplary damages from South Wales Police for malicious prosecution and misfeasance in public office.

O'Brien's conviction was based on the "confession" of an associate of his, Darren Hall, who had been with him the night of the murder. The misconduct alleged by O'Brien included that police officers;

- Applied improper pressure to Hall and himself during interviewing in an attempt to induce admissions, "without regard to the truth or reliability" of them,
- Fabricated admissions of guilt, and;
- Suppressed evidence which exonerated the defendants.

O'Brien wished to have evidence admitted that would show that the two police officers leading the investigation against him had led two other cases where similar misconduct had been alleged; the Welsh bomb trial and the murder of Karen Price.

At a case management conference of O'Brien's claim, Judge Graham Jones of the High Court, granted permission to O'Brien to rely on the similar fact evidence. The police appealed this decision unsuccessfully to the Court of Appeal and subsequently appealed to the House of Lords.

== Judgments ==
The House of Lords unanimously dismissed the appeal.

Lord Bingham noted that,

"Any evidence, to be admissible, must be relevant. Contested trials last long enough as it is without spending time on evidence which is irrelevant and cannot affect the outcome. Relevance must, and can only, be judged by reference to the issue which the court (whether judge or jury) is called upon to decide. As Lord Simon of Glaisdale observed in Director of Public Prosecutions v Kilbourne [1973] AC 729, 756, "Evidence is relevant if it is logically probative or disprobative of some matter which requires proof ….. relevant (ie. logically probative or disprobative) evidence is evidence which makes the matter which requires proof more or less probable"."

Lord Bingham then concluded that evidence must satisfy a two-stage test before being admitted in a civil case. Firstly, it will be legally admissible if it is probative of a relevant matter. Secondly, judges will have to weigh the argument in favour of admitting the evidence against any arguments against admitting it, such as, the evidence relates to a collateral matter, is potentially prejudicial or unduly burdensome. Lord Phillips observed,

"The Court of Appeal held that, in civil as opposed to criminal proceedings, the judge has to proceed in two stages when deciding whether to admit evidence. First he has to decide whether the evidence is admissible. If it is, he has to decide, as a matter of discretion whether he will permit the evidence to be led. The test of admissibility is that propounded by your Lordships' House in Director of Public Prosecutions v P [1991]2 AC 447. The exercise of discretion as to whether admissible evidence should be permitted to be led involves the approach that the judge should bring to case management in accordance with the Civil Procedure Rules (CPR)."

On the issue of admissibility, Lord Phillips held: "I would simply apply the test of relevance as the test of admissibility of similar fact evidence in a civil suit. Such evidence is admissible if it is potentially probative of an issue in the action."

== Settlement ==
South Wales Police settled O'Brien's claims out of court for £300,000 in 2006. The BBC described it as the, "highest pay-out of its kind in a case of false imprisonment and malicious prosecution."
