= South Wales Police =

Welsh territorial police force

South Wales Police Heddlu De Cymru

Agency overview
- Formed: 1 June 1969; 57 years ago
- Annual budget: £315.8M 2020-2021
- Legal personality: Territorial police force

Jurisdictional structure
- Operations jurisdiction: Bridgend; Cardiff; Merthyr Tydfil; Neath Port Talbot; Rhondda Cynon Taf; Swansea; Vale of Glamorgan
- South Wales Police operations area
- Area: 803 square miles (2,080 km^{2})
- Population: 1.34 million
- Legal jurisdiction: England and Wales
- Constituting instrument: Police Act 1996
- General nature: Local civilian police

Operational structure
- Overseen by: His Majesty's Inspectorate of Constabulary and Fire & Rescue Services; Independent Office for Police Conduct
- Headquarters: Bridgend
- Police officers: 3,119 (2020); 152 special constables (2020)
- PCSOs: 366 (2020)
- Police and Crime Commissioner responsible: Emma Wools, Labour
- Agency executive: Jeremy Vaughan, Chief Constable
- Basic Command Units: Cardiff and the Vale; Mid Glamorgan; Swansea Neath Port Talbot

Facilities
- Stations: 43
- Total vehicles: 773

Website
- www.south-wales.police.uk

South Wales Police (Welsh: Heddlu De Cymru; SWP) is one of the four territorial police forces in Wales. It is headquartered in Bridgend.

The force was formed as South Wales Constabulary on 1 June 1969, by the amalgamation of the former Glamorgan Constabulary, Cardiff City Police, Swansea Borough Police and Merthyr Tydfil Borough Police. In 1974, with the reorganisation of local government, the force's area was expanded to cover the newly created counties of Mid, South and West Glamorgan. In 1996, the force adopted its current name and lost the Rhymney Valley area to Gwent Police due to further local government reorganisation.

Today, the force serves the principal areas of Bridgend, Cardiff, Merthyr Tydfil, Neath Port Talbot, Rhondda Cynon Taf, Swansea and the Vale of Glamorgan – most of the historic county of Glamorgan.

== Organisation ==
The force is overseen by the South Wales Police and Crime Commissioner, which replaced a police authority of councillors, magistrates and lay members in 2012.

South Wales Police covers an area of 803 square miles (2,080 km^{2}) and population of 1.34 million people. In the 2020-2021 Financial year, the force's annual budget was £315.8 million.

As of September 2020, the force has 3,119 police officers, 152 special constables, 366 police community support officers (PCSO), 265 police support volunteers (PSV), and 2,167 staff. Of the 3,012 full-time constables as of March 2020, 2,057 were male and 956 female, 79 officers identified as being from black and minority ethnic (BAME) groups, representing 2.2% of the workforce. BAME groups are disproportionality under-represented in the force, with 6.6% of the population covered by the force identifying as BAME.

At the most recent PEEL (police effectiveness, efficiency and legitimacy) inspection by Her Majesty's Inspectorate of Constabulary and Fire & Rescue Services in 2019, the force scored "good" across the three key areas, with a number of areas for improvement also identified.

As with all public bodies in Wales, the force is required to adhere to the Welsh language standards set out by the Welsh Government. These include a commitment to maintain equal status of English and Welsh, bi-lingual signage and correspondence and a standing right for individuals to be dealt with in Welsh if they so choose. The Welsh Language Commissioner publishes biennial reports into the compliance with the standards.

=== Chief constables ===
Since the formation of the force in its current form, it has had ten chief constables.

- 1969–1971: Melbourne Thomas
- 1971–1979: Sir Gwilym Morris
- 1979–1983: Sir John Woodcock
- 1983–1988: David East
- 1989–1996: Robert Lawrence
- 1996–2003: Sir Anthony Burden
- 2004–2009: Barbara Wilding
- 2010–2017: Peter Vaughan
- 2018–2020: Matt Jukes
- 2020–present: Jeremy Vaughan

=== Police stations ===
The following police stations have operational public front desks as of 2018.

- Barry police station
- Bridgend Bridewell station
- Cardiff Bay police station
- Cardiff Central police station
- Merthyr Tydfil Bridewell station
- Neath police station
- Pontypridd police station
- Swansea police station
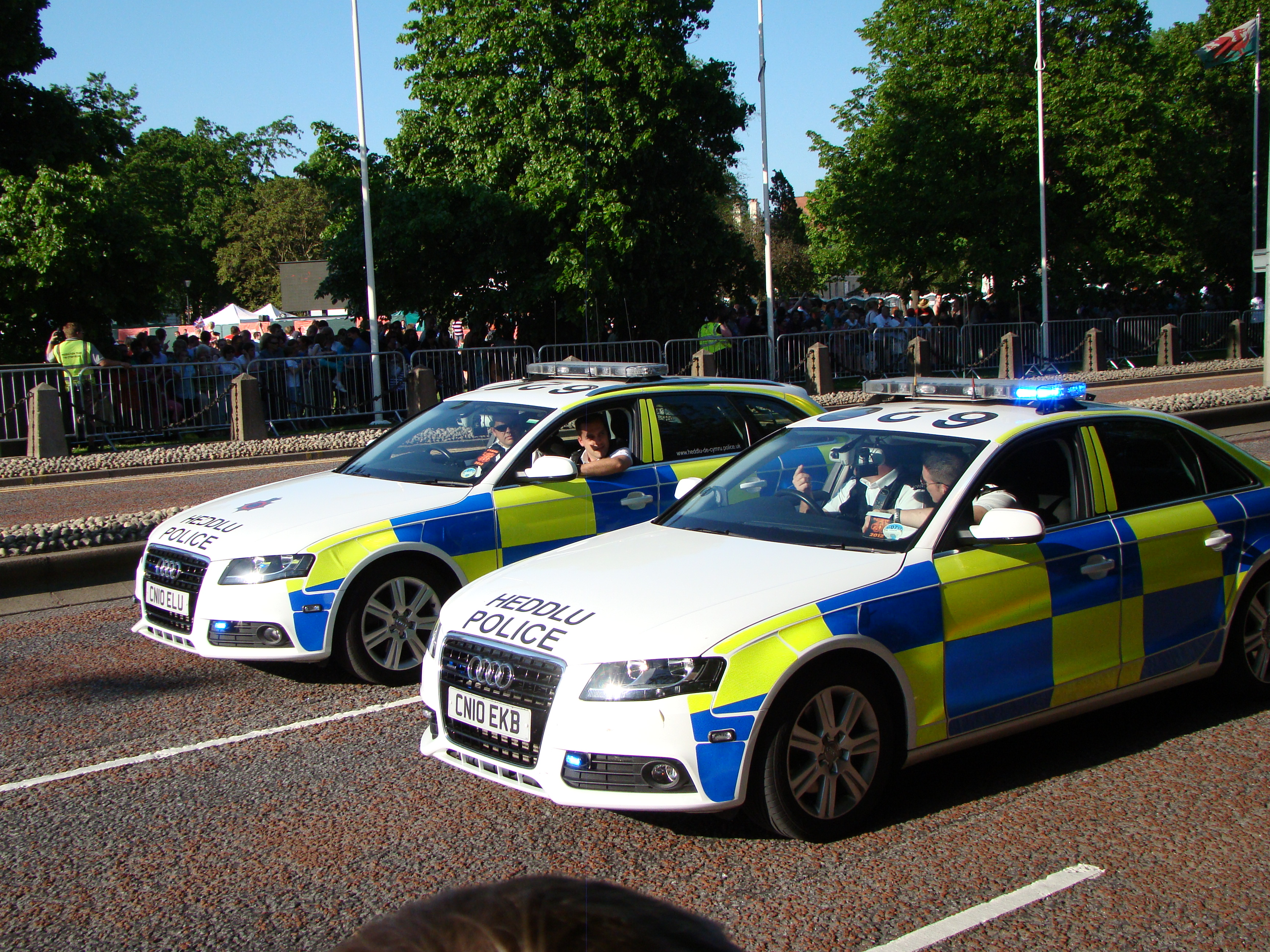
South Wales Police vehicles pictured in 2012

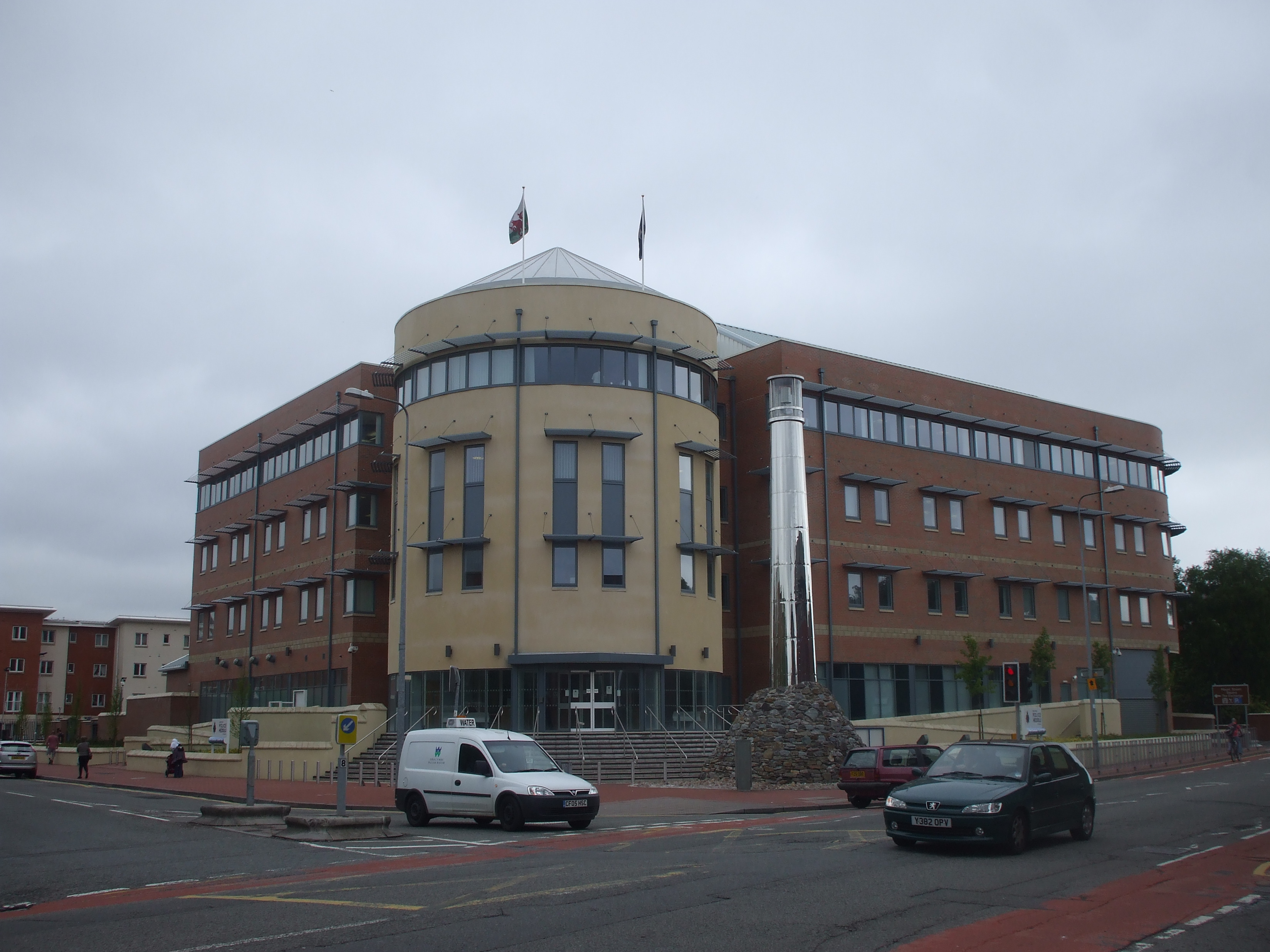
Cardiff Bay police station

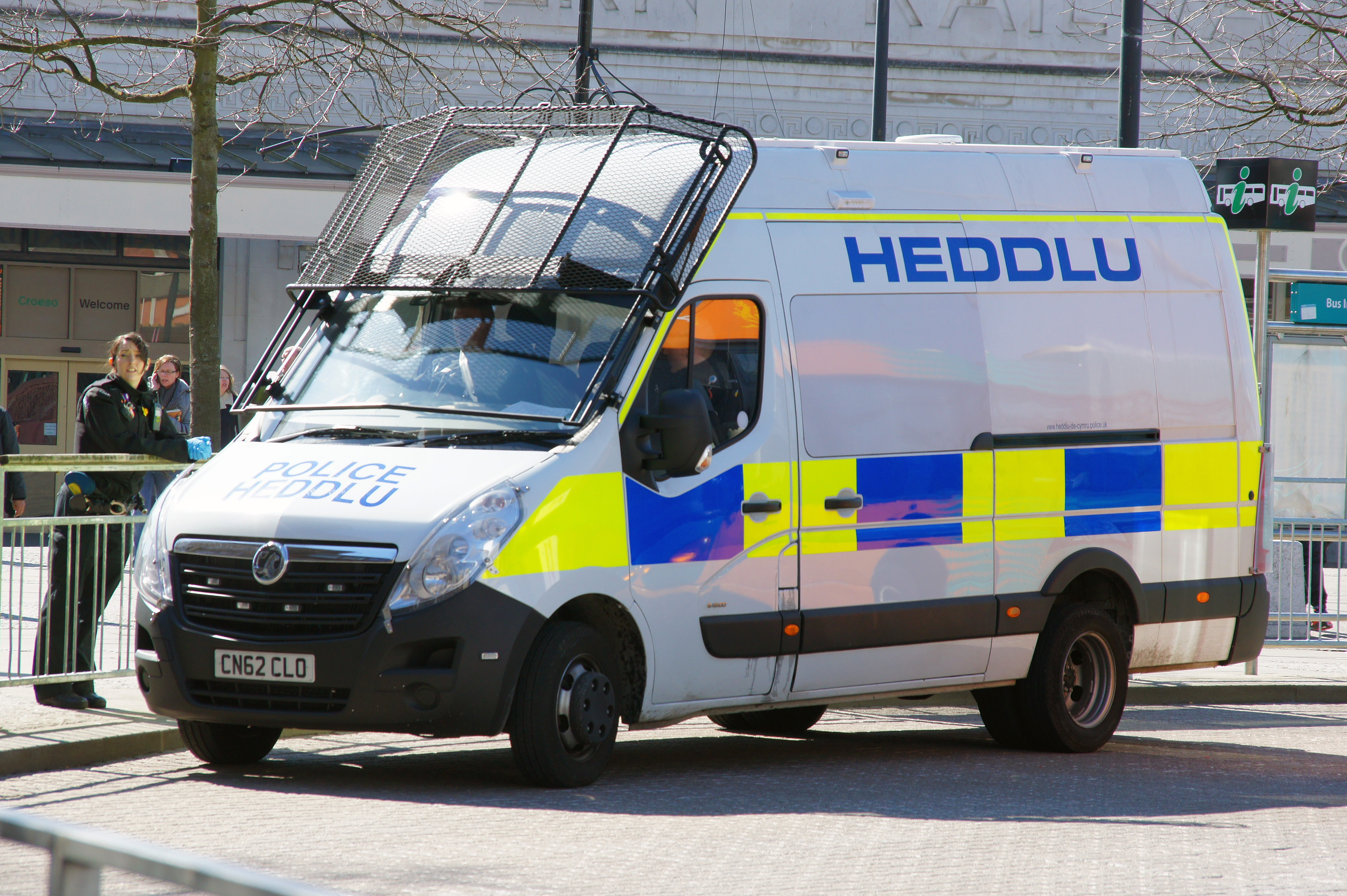
Cardiff Police van pictured in 2013

=== Air Support Unit ===
The South and East Wales Air Support Unit was a consortium established to provide police aviation for South Wales and Gwent police. It was managed by Inspector Gary Smart and operated a Eurocopter EC135 from MOD St Athan in the Vale of Glamorgan. From October 2012 it was replaced by the National Police Air Service.

== Recruitment ==
As of 2019, police officer applicants to South Wales Police are required to have a degree as part of the Degree Holder Entry Programme (DHEP). For those who already hold a degree in any subject area, a two-year programme combining on-the-job practical learning and operational competence with academic learning. Upon completion, successful candidates achieve a Diploma in Professional Policing Practice. South Wales Police also offer a pre-join degree programme in partnership with The University of South Wales.

Non degree holders can join under the Police Constable Degree Apprenticeship (PCDA), a three-year practice-based higher-education programme, leading to a BSc Honours Degree in Professional Policing Practice.

New recruits are selected under the national standard College of Policing SEARCH assessment centre and fitness test.

== Controversies ==
The Cardiff Newsagent Three were three men wrongly convicted of the 1987 murder of Cardiff newsagent Phillip Saunders, who was attacked with a shovel in the back yard of his Cardiff home and later died in hospital. Michael O'Brien, Darren Hall and Ellis Sherwood spent 11 years in prison before being released.

In 1989, the body of Karen Price was discovered in Cardiff. Two construction workers unearthed a rolled carpet while installing a garden behind a house. It was disclosed that a number of officers from the South Wales Constabulary who were involved in the investigation of Price's murder had also worked on the Lynette White and Philip Saunders murder inquiries, in which six men were wrongfully convicted. Other sources of concern in the Price case, according to the commission, included breaches of the Police and Criminal Evidence Act 1984 (PACE) and the PACE Code of Practice, which govern the detention, treatment, and questioning of persons by police officers; the credibility of the prosecution witnesses; "oppressive handling by the police of key witnesses"; and the "veracity of Mr. Ali's guilty plea".

=== Suppression of anti-apartheid protest ===
In November 1969, the South Africa national rugby union team played Swansea RFC at St. Helen's Rugby and Cricket Ground as part of the 1969–70 South Africa rugby union tour of Britain and Ireland, during which many matches were protested due to South Africa's system of Apartheid. The match that took place in Swansea became known as the "Battle of Swansea" due to violent clashes between protesters, police and stewards hired to assist with policing of the match. In the aftermath of the match, 30 complaints were made against the police and over 100 people were injured including 11 police officers. Eyewitness and future MP Hywel Francis describing the policing of the event as "a military-style operation". The leader of the protests, Peter Hain described the response to the protest as being "particularly nasty" and described his shock at discovering "a friend had a broken jaw and a woman demonstrator almost lost an eye". After the event the then Home Secretary, James Callaghan spoke in the House of Commons criticising the police's use of stewards stating "My own view, and I want to put this to the chief constables, is that it is better for the police to tackle this job themselves rather than to have amateur assistants, no doubt of a very beefy character, but not necessarily designed to ensure that the peace is not breached."

=== Murder of Lynette White and false convictions ===
In November 1988, South Wales Constabulary charged five mixed-race men with the murder of Lynette White, although none of the scientific evidence discovered at the crime scene could be linked to them, and a white male was seen in the vicinity at the time of the murder. On conclusion of the longest murder trial in British history, in November 1990 three of the men were found guilty and sentenced to life imprisonment. In December 1992, the convictions were ruled unsafe and quashed by the Court of Appeal after it was decided that the police investigating the murder had acted improperly. The wrongful conviction of the three men has been called one of the most egregious miscarriages of justice in recent times. The police claimed that they had done nothing wrong, that the men had been released purely on a technicality of law, and resisted all calls for the case to be reopened.

In 2004, the Independent Police Complaints Commission (IPCC) began a review of the conduct of the police during the original inquiry. Over the next 12 months, around 30 people were arrested in connection with the investigation, 19 of whom were serving or retired police officers. In 2007 three of the prosecution witnesses at the original murder trial were convicted of perjury and each jailed for 18 months. In 2009 two further witnesses from the original trial were also charged with perjury. Along with eight former police officers charged with conspiring to pervert the course of justice, they stood trial in 2011. The trial was the largest police corruption trial in British criminal history. A further four police officers were due to be tried on the same charges in 2012. In November 2011, the case collapsed when the defence submitted that copies of files which they said they should have seen had instead been destroyed. As a result, the judge ruled that the defendants could not receive a fair trial and all 14 were acquitted. In January 2012 the "destroyed" documents were found, still in the original box in which they had been sent to South Wales Police by the IPCC.

=== Jeffrey Davies rape convictions ===
In July 2016, a former police detective was jailed for 18 years after he was found guilty of raping two women. Jeffrey Davies, 45, of Aberdare, was serving in the Rhondda Valley when he raped his victims in 2002 and 2003. Cardiff Crown Court heard he was dismissed from the force in 2013 after being convicted of other sexual assaults. IPCC Commissioner for Wales, Jan Williams, has said Davies was a "sex offender hiding within the police".

=== Ian Watkins investigation ===
An Independent Police Complaints Commission (IPCC) investigation report, published in August 2017, into the force's investigation of the child sex offender Ian Watkins, found that they had failed a number of times from 2008 to 2012 act on reports of Watkins' behaviour. The report concluded:

The consequence of the force’s failings was arguably that a predatory paedophile offended over an extended period of time. The evidence obtained in this investigation suggests that South Wales police were faced with a litany of reports about his behaviour, yet in some instances did not carry out even rudimentary investigation, made errors and omissions and missed opportunities to bring him to justice earlier than he ultimately was.

South Wales Police Assistant Chief Constable Jeremy Vaughan said his force "entirely accepts and regrets" the findings of the report.

=== Use of facial recognition ===
South Wales Police became one of the first three Police forces in the United Kingdom to use facial recognition to police large events alongside the Metropolitan Police and Leicestershire Police, although the latter force discontinued use soon after adoption. The use of facial recognition was met by much criticism, mainly revolving around the high rate of false positives with over 90% of people identified being incorrectly flagged. The use of the technology at football games was described by the North Wales Police and Crime Commissioner Arfon Jones as "disproportionate" adding that its use could lead to miscarriages of justice. Prof Paul Wiles, the UK biometrics commissioner criticised the lack of government oversight of the technology saying that due to the lack of legal framework governing the technology it is at the police's discretion whether the public benefit exceeds the "significant intrusion into an individual’s privacy" caused by the use of facial recognition.

The first time a court had ever considered the use of facial recognition technology was when someone who had been photographed by the technology brought a legal challenge against the use of facial recognition by South Wales Police arguing that its use constitutes a breach of privacy. This legal challenge was unsuccessful but is currently being appealed.

South Wales Police have also been criticised by civil liberties groups as the technology is more likely to give a false positive if the person being scanned is a woman or an ethnic minority. South Wales Police refute this claim on the basis that "AFR does not define race of an individual. When a person is potentially identified through the system. The identification is made on the match between the person’s eyes and is based on algorithm matches. The camera does not define race or sex of an individual." Although a Cardiff University assessment of the technology on behalf of the police did not test for misidentification on the basis of ethnicity or gender and acknowledged that this is a known issue with facial recognition technology "Multiple research studies have reported algorithmic biases regarding ethnicity in facial recognition systems. This was not an aspect empirically tested by the current study. It is an area of concern though."

In August 2019, South Wales Police announced that they would be trialling the use of facial recognition technology on 50 officers phones for three months, although no update has been given since.

=== Sexual misconduct ===
In October 2021, it was revealed that eight SWP officers had been arrested for sex offences between 2018 and March 2021, the joint-fourth highest of any police force in the UK. A spokesperson for SWP said:

"Recent cases have demonstrated why it is so important for every officer and member of staff to maintain the highest standards of integrity and professionalism and it is down to everyone, regardless of rank or role, to report any colleagues who fall short of these standards. South Wales Police takes allegations of sexual misconduct extremely seriously and will thoroughly investigate those who fail to uphold the highest standards of professional behaviour. Members of the public and the communities of South Wales should be reassured that the force's Professional Standards Department will fully investigate any complaint or allegation relating to an individual's conduct.

In the most serious cases where allegations have been proven, officers have been dismissed from the organisation. Referrals are also made to the College of Policing for officers to be added to the Barring List, preventing them from returning to the profession. It is this sort of unacceptable behaviour which undermines the trust that the public place in our service as well as the efforts of the overwhelming majority of officers and staff who work hard to keep our communities safe."

Figures published by the National Police Chiefs Council on 14 March 2023 revealed that SWP had the highest number of officers and staff involved in allegations of sexual and physical violence against women and girls, accounting for 63 percent of all complaints against Welsh police forces.

=== Deaths of Kyrees Sullivan and Harvey Evans ===
On 22 May 2023, teenagers Kyrees Sullivan and Harvey Evans were killed in a road traffic collision after being chased by South Wales Police officers in the estate of Ely near Cardiff. Their deaths resulted in rioting in Ely throughout the night and into the early hours of 23 May. South Wales Police and Crime Commissioner Alun Michael initially denied the teenagers were being chased by SWP, stating rumours on social media had sparked the disorder, however SWP would later confirm a police van had been chasing the teenagers shortly before the teenagers crashed their electric bicycle. The event was referred to the Independent Office for Police Conduct for investigation who, on 13 June 2023 stated they had served gross misconduct notices to the two officers in the van, the driver and the passenger.

=== Arrests and allegations of brutality against pro-Palestine demonstrators ===
In early June 2024, 19 arrests were made against pro-Palestine demonstrators, the majority of whom in Cardiff. A disabled protestor from Swansea was arrested by eight officers during a pro-Palestine sit-in protest in Cardiff, followed by 16 protestors at a sit-in in Cardiff Bay Police Station later that night demanding his release. Two people were then arrested in Swansea, including a 12-year-old Palestinian girl.

Campaign groups such as Cymru Students for Palestine have accused South Wales Police of police brutality and unlawful arrest, with those at Cardiff Bay kicked, dragged, pulled, and left with bruises and cuts. South Wales Police denies that anyone sustained injuries.

One of the 19 and a known acquaintance were later raided and arrested on June 29 over a video online of her questioning the MP for Pontypridd Alex Davies-Jones over her abstention on a ceasefire vote.

== See also ==
- Law enforcement in the United Kingdom
- List of law enforcement agencies in the United Kingdom, Crown Dependencies and British Overseas Territories
- Murders of Harry and Megan Tooze – some of Wales' most notorious unsolved murders, occurred in South Wales Police's jurisdiction
