= Northern Ireland Assembly Commission =

The Northern Ireland Assembly Commission (usually referred to as the Assembly Commission) is the corporate body of the Northern Ireland Assembly. The commission is headed by the Speaker of the Northern Ireland Assembly, currently Edwin Poots MLA.

== Establishment ==
The Northern Ireland Act (1998) established a Northern Ireland Assembly. The Act provides for the creation of a Commission to make "arrangements for administrative, secretarial or other assistance" to the Assembly. The Act defines the Presiding Officer (styled Speaker in the manner of the old Parliament of Northern Ireland) as the chairperson of the commission. Legal proceedings taken for or against the Assembly are taken for or against the commission on behalf of the Assembly.

The Assembly staff assigned to this body now form an enlarged Commission Secretariat. The secretariat had a staff of 71 during the 2009-10 session.

== Responsibilities ==
The commission has responsibility for the pay and pensions of members both directly and through tax-payer funded appointees. The first ever Act of the Assembly was to do with members pensions and was taken through its Assembly stages with very little ado by a member of the commission. The members of the commission are party appointees who receive a substantial premium over and above the basic MLA salary. This body also has an interest in the provision of property, staff and services to support Assembly members, Parliament Buildings and grounds.

== Commission membership ==
The Commission consists of the Speaker along with five other Assembly members.

| Party | Member |
|---|---|
| Independent | Edwin Poots MLA (chairperson) |
| Sinn Féin | Sinéad Ennis |
| DUP | Trevor Clarke (politician) |
| Alliance | Nuala McAllister |
| UUP | Andy Allen (politician) |
| SDLP | Colin McGrath |

== See also ==
- Scottish Parliamentary Corporate Body
- Senedd Commission
- House of Commons Commission
- House of Lords Commission
- Houses of the Oireachtas Commission
