= Murder of Karen Price =

1981 Welsh murder case

Karen Price
- Comparison of a clay reconstruction of Karen Price's skull with a photograph of Price.
- Born: 1966
- Disappeared: c. 2 July 1981; Cardiff, Wales
- Status: Identified circa 1990
- Died: c. 1981
- Cause of death: Homicide by strangulation
- Body discovered: 7 December 1989; Cardiff, Wales
- Other name: Little Miss Nobody
- Known for: Formerly unidentified victim of homicide

Karen Price (known posthumously as Little Miss Nobody) was a 15-year-old Welsh murder victim who disappeared in 1981. After the discovery of her body in 1989, British facial reconstruction artist Richard Neave used her skull to create a model of her physical appearance. The reconstruction and the matching of DNA in the body to that of Price's parents allowed her body to be identified. The case was cited as one of the first instances in which DNA technology was used in this way.

== Discovery and identification ==
On 7 December 1989, two construction workers installing a garden behind a house in Cardiff, Wales discovered a rolled up carpet buried in the ground. When the carpet was unrolled, the skeletal remains of a young female were revealed. There was a plastic bag placed over her head, and her arms were tied behind her back. Forensic entomologists studied insect eggs around the discovery site and determined that the girl had been dead for 5 to 10 years. When early efforts to identify the body failed, Richard Neave of Manchester University created a clay facial reconstruction of the skull. This reconstruction, along with a comparison of DNA samples from the victim and Price's parents, made the identification possible.

The police investigation discovered that Price was living in a children's home, and had run away in July 1981. This was not the first time she had run away from the home, but she did not return on this occasion. She later turned to prostitution. In 1991, Idris Ali and Alan Charlton, who were alleged to have managed her solicitation as a prostitute, were charged with her murder. Ali's charge was eventually reduced to manslaughter, and he was released in 1994. Charlton continued to serve a life sentence, but was released on parole in 2017.

== Review of convictions ==
In February 2014, the Criminal Cases Review Commission, the public body responsible for investigating alleged miscarriages of justice in England, Wales, and Northern Ireland, referred Charlton's conviction to the Court of Appeal, stating that there was a "real possibility" that the conviction could be overturned. In March 2015, the commission also referred Ali's conviction to the appeal court, stating, "There is a real possibility the Court of Appeal will conclude that the conviction is unsafe because of the risk of the prosecution amounting to an abuse of process." It was disclosed that a number of officers from the South Wales Police who were involved in the investigation of Price's murder had also worked on the Lynette White and Philip Saunders murder inquiries, in which six men were wrongfully convicted.

Other sources of concern in the Price case, according to the commission, included breaches of the Police and Criminal Evidence Act 1984 (PACE) and the PACE Code of Practice, which govern the detention, treatment, and questioning of persons by police officers; the credibility of the prosecution witnesses; "oppressive handling by the police of key witnesses"; and the "veracity of Mr Ali's guilty plea".

In 2016, both men's appeals were dismissed at the Court of Appeal in London.

== See also ==
- List of solved missing person cases: 1950–1999

== Cited works and further reading ==
- Evans, Colin (1996). The Casebook of Forensic Detection: How Science Solved 100 of the World's Most Baffling Crimes. New York: John Wiley & Sons Inc. ISBN 978-0-471-07650-6.
- Halber, Deborah (2015). The Skeleton Crew: How Amateur Sleuths Are Solving America's Coldest Cases. New York: Simon & Schuster. ISBN 978-1-451-65758-6.
- Murray, Elizabeth A. (2012). Forensic Identification: Putting a Name and Face on Death. Twenty-First Century Books. ISBN 978-1-467-70139-6
- Palmer, Trisha (1994). Real-Life Crimes: Forensic Mysteries. Chancellor Press. pp. 5–11. ISBN 978-1-851-52489-1
