= Scottish Parliamentary Corporate Body =

Administrative body of the Scottish Parliament

The Scottish Parliamentary Corporate Body (SPCB) is a body of the Scottish Parliament responsible for the administration of the parliament. It also has a role in provision of services to commissioners and other statutory appointments made by the parliament.

== Role ==
The SPCB is established by section 21 of, and schedule 2 to, the Scotland Act 1998, but it was left to the Scottish Parliament to decide how the SPCB operates. The SPCB considers and makes decisions on a wide range of issues to do with the running of the parliament including the property, staff and resources that the parliament requires in order to operate. The corporate body administers the resources of the parliament as well as the budget of the parliament. It also considers the use of parliamentary facilities and is responsible for the staffing and security of the parliament.

== Members ==
The SPCB is convened by the Presiding Officer of the Scottish Parliament and at least four other MSPs.

Each member of the body takes on a specific portfolio.

Scottish Parliamentary Corporate Body (SPCB) Session 7
| Portfolio | Portrait | Member | Term | Party |
|---|---|---|---|---|
| Convenor | Official portrait of Kenneth Gibson MSP. He is smiling, with short grey hair, wearing a suit and tie. There is a grey-ish background. | Kenneth Gibson MSP | 2026–present | Independent |
| Finance and resilience | Official Portrait of Maggie Chapman MSP. She is smiling, with short grey-ish hair and a colorful patterned shawl. There is a grey-ish background. | Maggie Chapman MSP | 2021–present | Scottish Green |
| Security and digital | Official Portrait of Jackie Dunbar MSP. She is smiling, with long brown hair. There is a grey-ish background. | Jackie Dunbar MSP | 2026–present | SNP |
| Parliamentary business and support | Official Portrait of Stephen Kerr MSP. He is smiling, with short blonde hair, wearing a suit and tie. There is a grey-ish background. | Stephen Kerr MSP | 2026–present | Conservatives |
| Officeholders and other Chief Executive Group matters | Official Portrait of Liam McArthur MSP. He is smiling, with short grey hair, wearing a suit and tie. There is a grey-ish background. | Liam McArthur MSP | 2026–present | Liberal Democrats |
| People and engagement | | Pauline McNeill MSP | 2026-present | Labour |
| Facilities, events and sustainability | | Graham Simpson MSP | 2026-present | Reform UK |

Former Members
| Session | Member | |
|---|---|---|
| 1 | David Steel | Convener |
| 1 | John Young | |
| 1 | Robert Brown | |
| 1 | Andrew Welsh | |
| 1 | Des McNulty | Resigned December 2001 |
| 1 | Duncan McNeil | Replaced McNulty |
| 2 | George Reid | Convener |
| 2 | John Scott | |
| 2 | Robert Brown | Resigned June 2005 |
| 2 | Nora Radcliffe | Replaced Brown |
| 2 | Andrew Welsh | Resigned January 2006 |
| 2 | Kenny MacAskill | Replaced Welsh |
| 3 | Alex Fergusson | Convener |
| 3 | Alex Johnstone | |
| 3 | Tricia Marwick | |
| 3 | Tom McCabe | |
| 3 | Mike Pringle | |
| 4 | Tricia Marwick | Convener |
| 4 | Liam McArthur | |
| 4 | Linda Fabiani | |
| 4 | Mary Scanlon | Resigned 2014 |
| 4 | Liz Smith | Replaced Scanlon |
| 4 | David Stewart | Resigned January 2015 |
| 4 | John Pentland | Replaced Stewart |
| 5 | Ken Macintosh | Convenor |
| 5 | Alex Johnstone | |
| 5 | Gordon MacDonald | |
| 5 | Liam McArthur | |
| 5 | David Stewart | |
| 5 | Andy Wightman | |
| 5 | Jackson Carlaw | |
| 5 | Sandra White | |
| 5 | Kezia Dugdale | |
| 5 | Rhoda Grant | |
| 5 | Ruth Davidson | |
| 5 | David Stewart | |
| 6 | Alison Johnstone | Convener |
| 6 | Maggie Chapman | |
| 6 | Jackson Carlaw | |
| 6 | Claire Baker | |
| 6 | Christine Grahame | |

== Officeholders ==
The Scottish Parliament is responsible for the appointment of several statutory positions for commissioners and senior public appointments. The parliament nominates individuals to the monarch, who formally appoints them to a post.

This includes the following posts:

- The Auditor General for Scotland
- The Scottish Public Services Ombudsman
- The Scottish Information Commissioner
- Scotland's Commissioner for Children and Young People
- The chair of the Scottish Human Rights Commission
- The Scottish Biometrics Commissioner

The SPCB provides the budget for each of the above with the exception of the Auditor General for Scotland, which is considered directly by parliament.

The SPCB is responsible for nominating the following posts to parliament:

- Commissioner for Ethical Standards in Public Life in Scotland
- members of the Scottish Human Rights Commission
- The Standards Commission for Scotland
- Clerk of the Scottish Parliament

== See also ==
- Member of the Scottish Parliament
- Scottish Parliament Building
- Scotland Act 1998
- House of Commons Commission
- House of Lords Commission
- Senedd Commission
- Northern Ireland Assembly Commission
