= Scottish Biometrics Commissioner =

- Incumbent; Brian Plastow since 12 April 2021
- Type: Commissioner
- Seat: Edinburgh
- Nominator: Scottish Parliamentary Corporate Body
- Appointer: Scottish Parliament
- Constituting instrument: The Scottish Biometrics Commissioner Act 2020 (Commencement) Regulations 2020
- Formation: 1 December 2020; 5 years ago
- First holder: Brian Plastow
- Website: www.biometricscommissioner.scot

The Scottish Biometrics Commissioner is an independent commissioner in Scotland with the responsibility for setting standards for lawful, effective and ethical practices in relation to the acquisition, retention, use and destruction of biometric data for criminal justice and police purposes by the Police Service of Scotland, the Scottish Police Authority, the Police Investigations and Review Commissioner.

In April 2022, the Commissioner released a report highlighting legal differences between Scotland and other UK jurisdictions regarding biometric data.

In February 2023, the Scottish Liberal Democrats indicated that they wanted the role to include all forms of biometric data including facial recognition as used by private entities such as shops, schools, supermarkets and other public places.

In March 2023 the Scottish Biometrics Commissioner published two joint assurance reviews. The first was a Joint Assurance Review of the acquisition of biometric data from children arrested in ScotlandThe SBC partnered with the Scottish Police Authority and CYCJ (centre for youth and criminal justice) on this report. The second was a Joint Assurance Review on the acquisition of biometric data from vulnerable persons in police custody requiring the support of an Appropriate Adult. The SBC partnered with the Scottish Police Authority on this report.

In March 2024 the SBC published an Assurance Review of the acquisition, use and retention of images and photographs for criminal justice and police purposes.

During 2024 the Commissioner attended the Criminal Justice Committee to discuss Annual Report and Accounts along wit providing a flavour of current and future work. The Commissioner has also attended the Finance and Public Administration Committee as part of the review of the Scotland's Commissioner Landscape.

== See also ==
- Biometrics and Surveillance Camera Commissioner
