= Claire Clancy =

Chief Executive and Clerk to the National Assembly for Wales

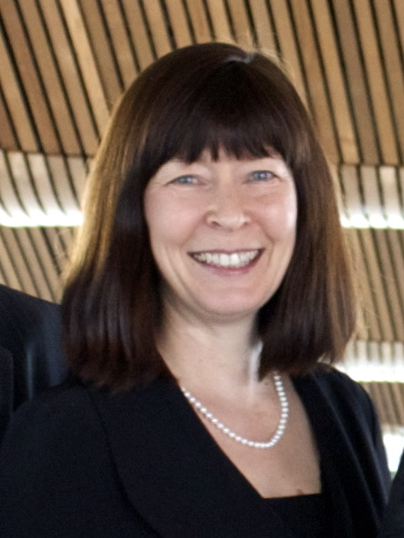
Clancy in 2012

Dame Claire Elizabeth Clancy DCB DL (born 14 March 1958) is a former Chief Executive and Clerk to the National Assembly for Wales, serving from February 2007 until April 2017.

== Background ==
She attended Dartford Grammar School for Girls, has a degree in psychology from the Open University and owns a farm near Abergavenny.

== Career ==
Clancy has spent many years working within public sector organisations. Before she joined the Assembly Commission, she was Chief Executive of Companies House and Registrar of Companies for England and Wales.

She joined Companies House in April 2002 from the Patent Office, where she was responsible for Corporate Services. As Chief Executive, Clancy was responsible for the overall direction and leadership of the Agency. She was accountable to DTI and its Ministers for the performance and finances of Companies House. She also had the formal statutory role of Registrar of Companies for England and Wales, and was the first woman to hold this position in over 150 years.

In the late 1990s, she spent two years on the island of St Helena and Ascension Island, where her husband, Michael Clancy, was Chief Secretary and Governor. She joined the civil service in 1977 and has worked in the Manpower Services Commission, the Department of Employment, the Government Office for the South West and was Chief Executive of Powys Training and Enterprise Council.

Clancy took up post as Chief Executive and Clerk of the National Assembly in February 2007. The post was created to reflect the growing powers of the Assembly following the Government of Wales Act 2006. From May 2007, the Chief Executive and Clerk lead an organisation independent of the Welsh Assembly Government. She was responsible for ensuring that the Assembly is provided with the property, staff and services that it requires. Clancy retired from her position as Chief Executive and Clerk in April 2017.

She was appointed Dame Commander of the Order of the Bath (DCB) in the 2017 Birthday Honours. She was appointed as High Sheriff of Gwent for 2019–2020, and is a Deputy Lieutenant of the county.

== Offices held ==
Senedd
Preceded by Paul Silk; Clerk to the National Assembly for Wales	Chief Executive and Clerk to the National Assembly for Wales; 2007 – 2017	Succeeded by Manon Antoniazzi
