= Facewatch =

British mass surveillance company

Facewatch is a British biometric surveillance company that uses facial recognition to observe customers in shops. Proponents of the system state that it allows shops to combat shoplifting. False positives by Facewatch systems have raised concerns about the reliability of the system, with members of the public experiencing long delays in having false information cleared from the system.

The system has been reported to have been used by Budgens, Sainsbury's, and Sports Direct.

The company's managing director is Nick Fisher. Fraser Sampson, the former Biometrics and Surveillance Camera Commissioner is now a non-executive director of Facewatch. According to The Guardian, Sampson's appointment as director occurred the day after his departure from the role of Biometrics and Surveillance Camera Commissioner.
