= Ffion Hague =

Welsh broadcaster, author, former civil servant (born 1968)

Dame Ffion Hague DBE
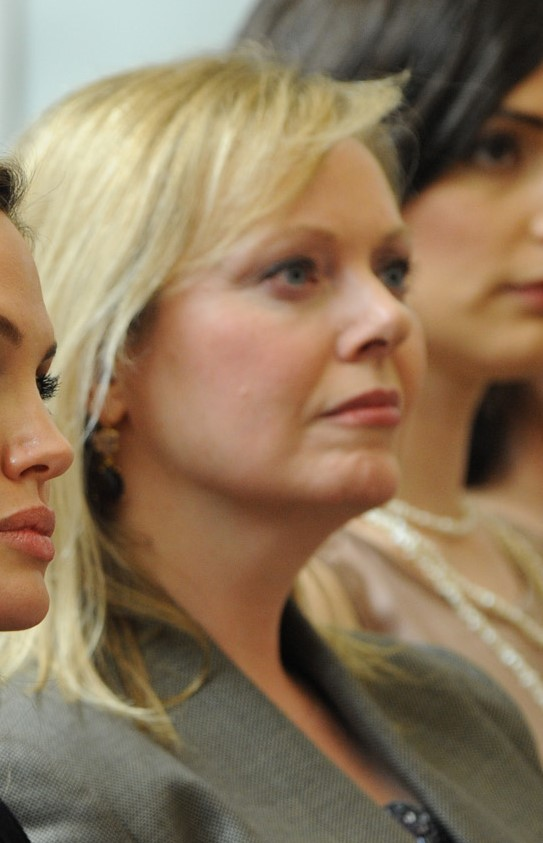
- Born: Ffion Llywelyn Jenkins; 21 February 1968 (age 58); Cardiff, Wales
- Education: Ysgol Gyfun Gymraeg Glantaf; Jesus College, Oxford
- Occupations: Corporate governance consultant, broadcaster, author and former civil servant
- Spouse: William Hague (m. 1997)
- Relatives: Manon Antoniazzi (sister)

Dame Ffion Llywelyn Hague DBE (née Jenkins; born 21 February 1968) is a Welsh businesswoman and board adviser specialising in corporate governance and board evaluation. She founded Independent Board Evaluation (IBE) in 2008 and advises listed and private companies, public-sector bodies and non-profit organisations in the United Kingdom and internationally. She is also an author and broadcaster, and previously worked as a civil servant.

== Early life ==
She is the daughter of Emyr and Myra Jenkins. Her father was a television presenter, director of the Eisteddfod, and the chief executive of the Arts Council of Wales. Her mother was a Welsh tutor and magistrate. She attended Ysgol Gyfun Gymraeg Glantaf, a Welsh-language comprehensive school in Cardiff, and went on to study English at Jesus College, Oxford.

After graduating she joined the civil service. She played the clarinet in the National Youth Orchestra of Wales and sang in the National Youth Choir of Wales. Hague is the younger sister of Manon Antoniazzi, Chief Executive and Clerk of the Senedd, who previously served as an assistant private secretary to Charles, Prince of Wales.

== Career ==
After graduating, Hague joined the Civil Service Fast Stream and worked at the Welsh Office, where she became private secretary to the Secretary of State for Wales. After leaving the civil service, she was director of policy and planning at Arts & Business. In 2000 she joined the executive-search firm Leonard Hull International. She later became a director of Hanson Green, where she developed its board-evaluation practice, remaining with the firm until 2008.

Hague founded Independent Board Evaluation in 2008. The consultancy conducts board-effectiveness reviews for listed and private companies, public-sector organisations and non-profit bodies in the United Kingdom and internationally. She was appointed a director of the Welsh water company Hafren Dyfrdwy in April 2026.

Her non-profit board roles have included the British Council and the Voices Foundation. She served as deputy chair of English National Opera until 2014 and as a trustee and deputy chair of the Outward Bound Trust from 2002 to 2012. She has been an honorary fellow of Harris Manchester College, Oxford, since 2010.

Hague wrote The Pain and the Privilege: The Women in Lloyd George's Life, published in 2008. For S4C, she presented Dwy Wraig Lloyd George, Tri Lle and the series Mamwlad, profiling historically significant Welsh women. Dwy Wraig Lloyd George received the Gwyn Alf Williams Award at the 2010 BAFTA Cymru Awards. She has also presented programmes for BBC Radio 3 and BBC Radio 4.

Hague was appointed a Dame Commander of the Order of the British Empire in the 2024 Birthday Honours for public service and services to business.

== Personal life ==
She met William Hague in 1995, when she became his private secretary at the Welsh Office.

They were married on 19 December 1997, at the Palace of Westminster, and live in Wales and London.
