= Biometrics and Surveillance Camera Commissioner =

UK government office

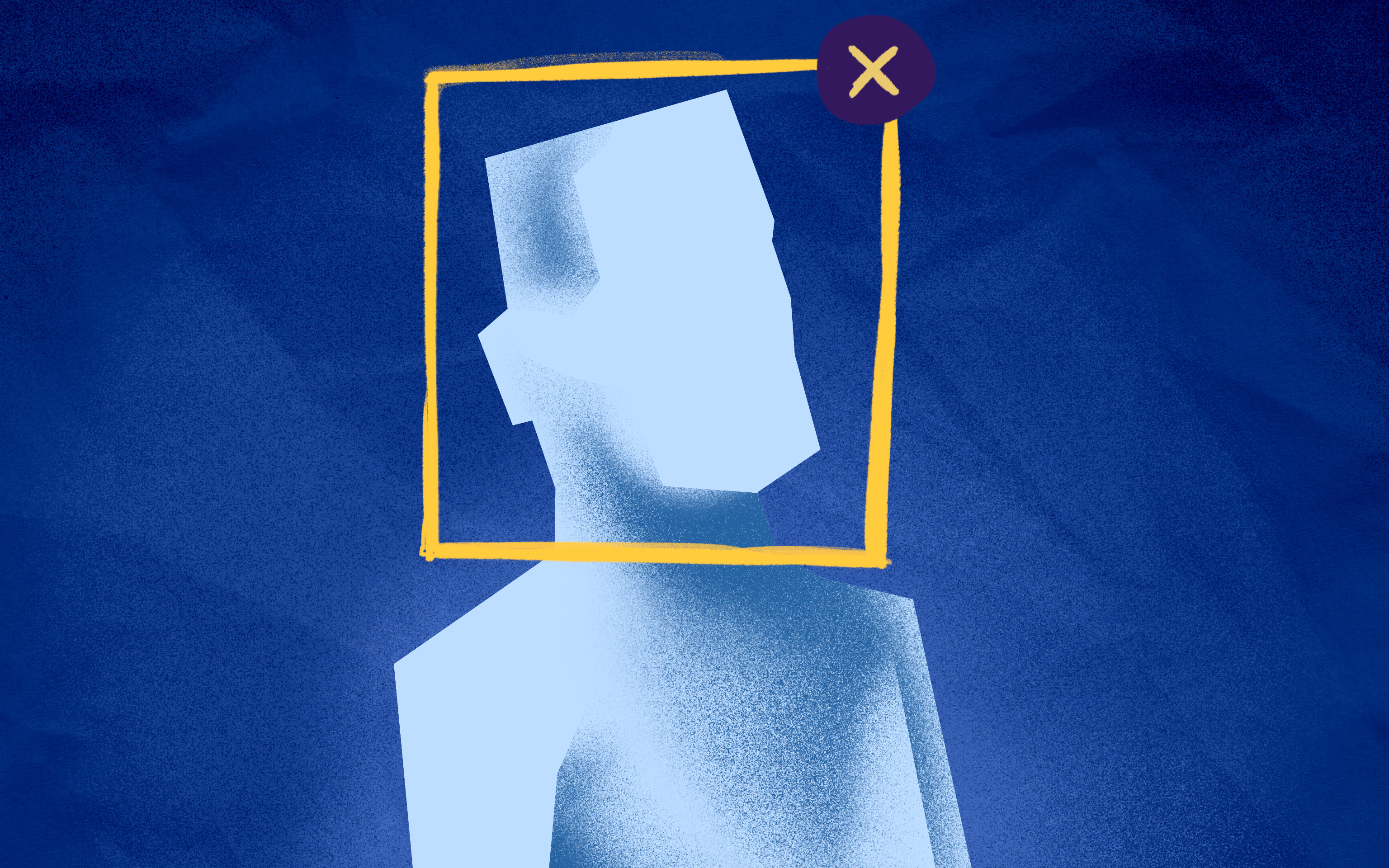
Artist's depiction of a facial recognition system.

The Biometrics and Surveillance Camera Commissioner is an independent advisor to the UK government created under the Protection of Freedoms Act 2012. Their role is to review the use and retention of biometrics by police, and to encourage compliance with the surveillance camera code of practice. The Biometrics and Surveillance Camera Commissioner is an independent monitoring body of the Home Office.

Although originally distinct, the UK government combined the roles of Biometrics Commissioner with those of the Surveillance Camera Commissioner in March 2021 due to an emerging need in facial recognition regulation, a type of surveillance camera technology with biometrics capabilities. Both offices were later merged in February 2022.

== Responsibilities ==
The role of the Biometrics and Surveillance Camera Commissioner is to:

- Review how the police use and keep DNA samples, DNA profiles and fingerprints.
- Approve or reject applications by the police to keep biometric material (under section 63G of the Police and Criminal Evidence Act 1984)
- Review national security implications of police retaining biometric material
- Ensure compliance with the Surveillance Camera Code of Practice
- Regularly review the code, and advise amendments.

The commissioner is independent of government. This means that they have no enforcement or inspection powers regarding biometrics or surveillance cameras. They work with relevant entities to make them aware of their duty to abide by relevant legislation or code.

The commissioner must produce an annual report for the Home Secretary detailing the commissioner's activities in the 12 months since the previous report. This report must also be presented to Parliament.

== List of commissioners ==
- Professor William Webster - Appointed 1 November 2025 (2 year appointment)
- Francesca Whitelaw KC - Interim Biometrics Commissioner (1st July 2025 - August 2024)
- Professor Fraser Sampson - (2021 - 2023) (Professor Fraser Sampson was appointed as a non-executive director of Facewatch Ltd, a private company that operates facial recognition systems, in November 2023)

== See also ==
- Scottish Biometrics Commissioner
