= Cardiff Newsagent Three =

1987 UK wrongly convicted murder case

The Cardiff Newsagent Three were three men wrongly convicted of the 1987 murder of Cardiff newsagent Phillip Saunders, who was attacked with a shovel in the back yard of his Cardiff home and later died in hospital. Michael O'Brien, Darren Hall and Ellis Sherwood were arrested and spent 11 years in prison before being released.

Their conviction in 1988 was largely based on a confession made by Darren Hall that he had acted as a lookout for the others for a "robbery that went wrong." In 1999, the Criminal Cases Review Commission ordered an appeal, during which the unreliability of Hall's "confession" was emphasised, on the basis that he was suffering from antisocial personality disorder at the time the statement was made, and had since retracted it. The conduct of South Wales Police was also questioned, particularly with regard to their interrogations of the suspects.

== Miscarriage of justice ==
On Friday, 17 December 1999, the Court of Appeal quashed their convictions. Upon their release, Michael O'Brien and Darren Hall announced that they would be taking legal action against South Wales Police, and also called for an inquiry into the police's investigations, pointing to other cases that had recently been overturned on appeal. At this point, O'Brien stated, "The only way this is going to come out is to have a full, open public inquiry. If it takes me another 10 years I am going to do it. I am going to become South Wales Police's worst nightmare." In 2001, O'Brien announced that he would be suing South Wales Police. Later that year the Police Complaints Authority stated that no action would be taken against any officers involved in the murder investigation.

O'Brien pursued a civil case against South Wales Police alleging malicious prosecution and misfeasance in public office by police officers involved in the case. As a result, in October 2006, O'Brien and Sherwood were given out-of-court settlements of £300,000 and £200,000 respectively by South Wales Police. At the time, these were the biggest out-of-court settlements ever given by an English or Welsh police force. Despite this, O'Brien continued to call for a public inquiry, expressing disappointment at the lack of admission of liability on the part of the police force.

O'Brien has also supported Jeremy Bamber, whom he met in prison and is convinced is another victim of a miscarriage of justice.

The full story of the murder and the miscarriage of justice which followed is told in Michael O'Brien's book, The Death of Justice (written with journalist Greg Lewis). The book's forensic exploration of the case led it to be used by a number of prisoners and campaigners as a guide for exposing miscarriages of justice.The prison publication, Inside Time, described O'Brien's story as "a modern day tale of David and Goliath; of one man’s quest to clear his name, taking his fight to the highest courts in the land and creating legal history".
