= Paul Silk =

Sir Evan Paul Silk KCB FLSW (born 8 February 1952) is a former clerk in the British House of Commons. He was formerly Clerk to the National Assembly for Wales from March 2001 to January 2007, the most senior official of the Assembly, and acted as the principal adviser to the Presiding Officer, responsible for all the services that are delivered to Assembly Members through the Assembly Parliamentary Service. In 2011, he was appointed as chair of the Commission on Devolution in Wales. In 2017 he was a member of the Expert Panel on Electoral Reform set up by the Assembly.

Sir Paul Silk is also a member of the Steering Committee of the Constitution Reform Group (CRG), a cross-party pressure group chaired by Robert Gascoyne-Cecil, 7th Marquess of Salisbury, which seeks a new constitutional settlement in the UK by way of a new Act of Union. The Constitution Reform Group's Act of Union Bill 2018 was introduced as a Private Member's Bill by Lord Lisvane in the House of Lords on 9 October 2018, when it received a formal first reading. The Bill has been described by the BBC as "one to watch" in the current Parliament.

In 2018, Silk was appointed Chair of the Membership Selection Panel of Glas Cymru. From 2019 to 2021 he was Deputy Chair of the Representative Body of the Church in Wales. He is a member of the UK Parliamentary and Political Service Honours Committee.

== Education ==
Silk was born in Crickhowell, Powys. He was educated at Christ College, Brecon; Brasenose College, Oxford; Princeton University (USA) and the Open University.

He is currently an honorary Professor at the Wales Governance Centre at Cardiff University, an Honorary Fellow of Aberystwyth University and a Fellow of the Learned Society of Wales. In 2019, he was made an Honorary Doctor of the University by the Open University.

== Professional career ==
Silk served as House of Commons Clerk for a total of almost 25 years (1975–77, 1979–2001 and 2007–10), clerking at different times three departmental Select Committees, including the Foreign Affairs and Home Affairs Committees.

Silk is a former Clerk of the Welsh Grand Committee. Clerk in charge of the Government of Wales Bill and contributed to drafting the first Standing Orders of the National Assembly. He has also worked as Presidential Adviser in the Council of Europe's Parliamentary Assembly, and has participated in a number of programmes for emerging democracies. He has written and lectured on Parliament and the Constitution.

Silk was appointed Knight Commander of the Order of the Bath (KCB) in the 2015 New Years Honours List for services to parliaments and devolution.

== Bibliography ==
- Paul Silk; Rhodri Walters (1989). How Parliament Works. Longman. ISBN 978-0-582-03635-2.

== Offices held ==
Senedd
Preceded by John Lloyd	Clerk to the National Assembly for Wales; 2001 – 2007	Succeeded by Claire Clancy
