= John Lloyd (civil servant) =

John Wilson Lloyd CB (born 24 December 1940) was formerly Clerk to the National Assembly for Wales from its inception in 1999 until his retirement in March 2001 and acted as the principal adviser to the Presiding Officer and was responsible for all the services which are delivered to Assembly Members through the Assembly Parliamentary Service (APS).

Before becoming clerk Lloyd was deputy secretary at the Welsh Office and in 2002 was appointed to the Royal Commission on the Ancient and Historical Monuments of Wales.

== Offices held ==
Senedd
Preceded by (new post)	Clerk to the National Assembly for Wales; 1999 – 2001	Succeeded by Paul Silk
