= Chief Executive and Clerk of the Senedd =

Position that relates to the Senedd

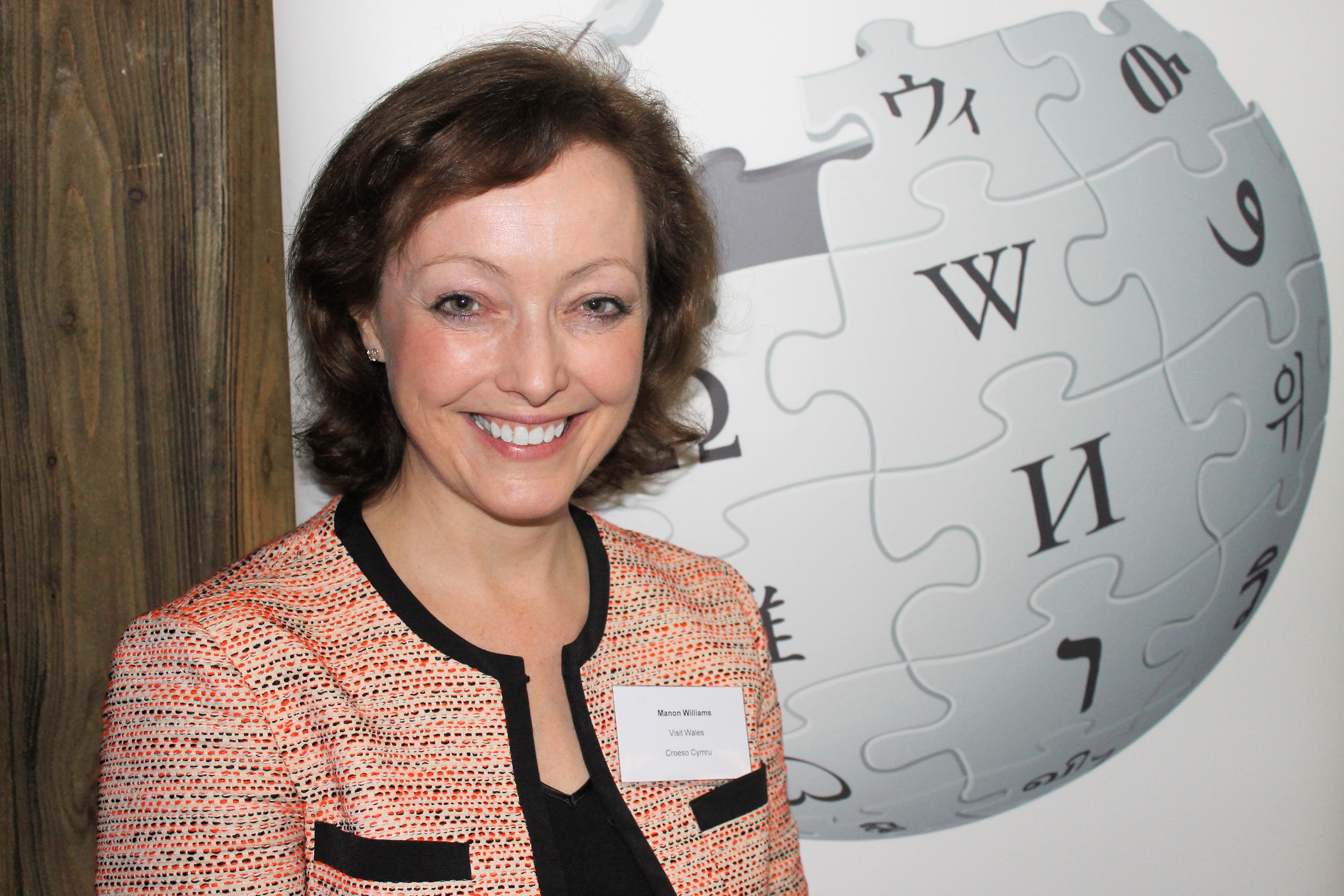
Manon Antoniazzi, Chief Executive and Clerk of the Senedd

Chief executive and clerk of the Senedd (Welsh: Clerc y Senedd) is a position that relates to the Senedd and the Senedd Commission. It was created in February 2007 to reflect the growing powers of the National Assembly for Wales following the Government of Wales Act 2006. Prior to this change, the Clerk of the National Assembly was a senior civil servant position and headed up the Assembly Parliamentary Service (APS).

From May 2007, the Chief Executive and Clerk has headed an organisation independent of the Welsh Government and is responsible for ensuring that the Senedd is provided with the property, staff and services that it requires.

== Clerk of the National Assembly for Wales ==
- John Lloyd, (1999 to 2001)
- Paul Silk, (2001 to 2007)

== Chief Executive and Clerk of the National Assembly for Wales / Senedd ==
- Claire Clancy, (February 2007 – April 2017).
- Manon Antoniazzi, (April 2017 – present)

== See also ==
- Clerk of the Parliaments
- Senedd Commission
- Clerk of the House of Commons
- Clerk of the Scottish Parliament
- Clerk of the Northern Ireland Assembly
