= Surveillance Camera Code of Practice =

The Surveillance Camera Code of Practice is a code of practice devoted to the operation of CCTV systems in the United Kingdom particularly in England and Wales. It was introduced under Section 30 (1) (a) of the Protection of Freedoms Act 2012. This code of practice was established in response to growing concerns regarding the potential abuse or misuse of surveillance technologies by governmental bodies such as local authorities and police forces, particularly in public spaces.

== Overview ==
The need for such a code arose due to apprehensions surrounding the unchecked expansion of surveillance capabilities by state entities, and the potential implications for civil liberties and privacy rights. In England and Wales, the Home Office took action to address these concerns by introducing the code, which emphasizes the responsible and accountable use of surveillance cameras.

== Reception ==
While proponents of the code argue that it represents a significant step towards ensuring the responsible deployment of surveillance technologies, critics, such as the campaign group Big Brother Watch, contend that it does not go far enough in safeguarding individual privacy rights. They argue for broader applicability of the code, stricter enforcement mechanisms, and enhanced accountability for breaches.

== See also ==
- Fake security camera
