= Clerk of the Zimbabwean Parliament =

Chief clerk of the Parliament of Zimbabwe

Clerk of the Parliament of Zimbabwe
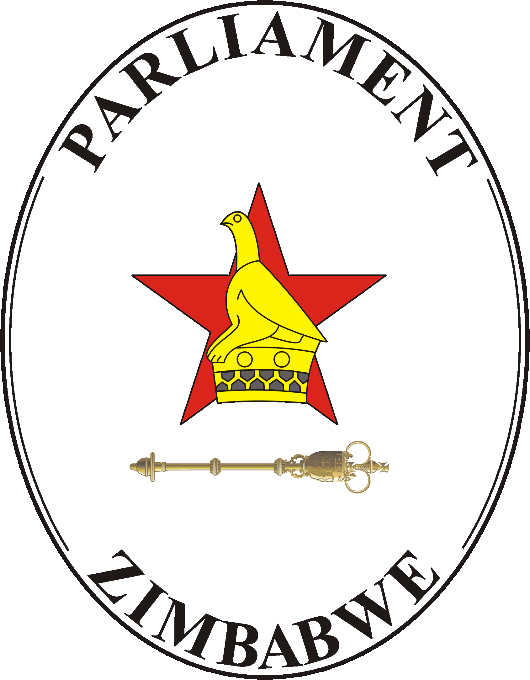
- Incumbent; Kennedy Chokuda since 20 May 2015
- Office of the Clerk
- Appointer: Committee on Standing Rules and Orders with the approval of the National Assembly
- Constituting instrument: Constitution of Zimbabwe
- Formation: Post-independence (1980); roots in colonial and Rhodesian parliamentary practice
- Website: Official website

The Clerk of the Parliament of Zimbabwe is the chief procedural and administrative officer of the Parliament of Zimbabwe. The Clerk serves both the Senate and the National Assembly, acting as the principal advisor on parliamentary procedure, the custodian of parliamentary records, and the head of the parliamentary administration.

The office combines elements of the Westminster parliamentary tradition with adaptations suited to Zimbabwe's bicameral legislature and constitutional framework. The current Clerk is Kennedy Mugove Chokuda.

== History ==
=== Westminster roots and colonial origins ===
The office derives from the British parliamentary system, in which the Clerk of the Parliaments and the Clerk of the House of Commons provide procedural expertise and administrative leadership. This model was exported to British colonies, including Southern Rhodesia, where Clerks supported legislative institutions from the early 20th century onward. In the colonial period, the Clerk advised on procedure, maintained records, and supported the legislative process under the authority of the presiding officer.

=== The Rhodesia period ===
During the self-governing colony of Southern Rhodesia and the subsequent Rhodesia period (including the Unilateral Declaration of Independence from 1965), the Parliament maintained a Clerk's office, commonly styled the Clerk of the House or Clerk of the Assembly. The role continued the Westminster tradition of providing impartial procedural advice while operating within the constitutional framework of the time. For example, at the opening of the First Session of the First Parliament on 30 May 1924, the Clerk of the House read the Proclamation before the members took the Oath of Allegiance, administered by the Senior Judge of the High Court. Clerks supported both the House of Assembly and, during bicameral periods (notably from 1970 onwards with the establishment of the Senate), the upper house. The office adapted to local conditions, including the political and constitutional changes of the UDI era, while retaining core functions such as record-keeping (maintaining the Journal of Parliament), bill certification, and advising the Speaker or President of the Senate on procedure, privilege, and the conduct of business.

=== Post-independence evolution ===
Following independence in 1980, the office was retained and adapted to the new constitutional order. The Clerk became the head of administration for the Parliament of Zimbabwe. The restoration of the Senate in 2005 and the adoption of the 2013 Constitution further shaped the office. The Clerk now serves both Houses and is explicitly provided for in section 154 of the Constitution. The role has evolved to meet modern demands such as supporting committee work, digital record-keeping, and public engagement in a democratic context.

== Role and functions ==
The Clerk performs both procedural and administrative functions, guided by the Constitution, Standing Orders, and other legislation.

=== Procedural functions ===
- Acts as the chief advisor to the Speaker, President of the Senate, and members on parliamentary procedure and practice.
- Serves as Chief Clerk-at-the-Table during sittings of both Houses.
- Maintains the official records of proceedings (the Journal of Parliament) and decisions of both Houses.
- Administers the oath or affirmation of loyalty to new members.
- Authenticates bills and acts before they are presented to the president for assent.
- Receives and processes amendments, notices, and other parliamentary business.
- Certifies the passage of legislation and supports the legislative process in both Houses and at joint sittings.

=== Administrative functions ===
- Serves as the head of administration and accounting officer of Parliament.
- Manages the daily operations of Parliament and oversees its departments and staff.
- Reports to the speaker of the National Assembly and the president of the Senate.
- Advises on the management of parliamentary resources and supports the work of committees.

== Appointment and tenure ==
The Clerk of Parliament is appointed by the Committee on Standing Rules and Orders (CSRO) with the approval of the National Assembly, in terms of section 154 of the Constitution of Zimbabwe.

The Clerk holds office on terms and conditions determined by the CSRO and is removable only in accordance with constitutional procedures. The position requires extensive experience in legislative procedure and administration.

== Deputy Clerk and support structure ==
The Clerk is supported by a Deputy Clerk and other senior officers who assist with both procedural and administrative duties. The Deputy Clerk often handles specific areas such as committee support or records management and may act in the Clerk’s absence.

== Independence and impartiality ==
Like its Westminster counterparts, the Clerk of Parliament is expected to act with impartiality and independence in providing procedural advice. The constitutional appointment process and security of tenure help safeguard this impartiality, ensuring the Clerk serves Parliament as an institution rather than any political party or individual office-holder.

== See also ==
- Parliament of Zimbabwe
- Speaker of the National Assembly of Zimbabwe
- President of the Senate of Zimbabwe
