= Clerk of the Scottish Parliament =

Clerical role in Parliament of the UK

- Incumbent; David McGill since 2019
- Scottish Parliament
- Status: Principal constitutional adviser to the House and Corporate Officer of the House
- Seat: Scottish Parliament
- Appointer: Scottish Parliament Corporate Body (de jure)
- Inaugural holder: Paul Grice
- Formation: 1999 (first temporary appointment)

The clerk of the Scottish Parliament is the chief executive of the Scottish Parliament.

== Appointment ==
The Clerk of the House is appointed by the Scottish Parliament Corporate Body.

== Duties ==
The Clerk of the Scottish Parliament is the principal constitutional adviser to the house, and adviser on all its procedure and business, and frequently appears before select and joint committees examining constitutional and parliamentary matters. As with all the members of the House Service, he is entirely politically impartial and is not a civil servant. Their duties include: providing advice to the Presiding Officer and deputies, signing the accounts of the Parliament; chairing Senior Executive Team meetings; attending Scottish Parliamentary Corporate Body and Bureau meetings in an advisory capacity.

== Incumbent ==
As of October 2019, the office is currently held by David McGill.

== See also ==
- Clerk to the Northern Ireland Assembly
- Clerk of the House of Commons
- Chief Executive and Clerk of the Senedd
