= Manon Antoniazzi =

Welsh senior civil servant (born 1965)

Manon Antoniazzi LVO
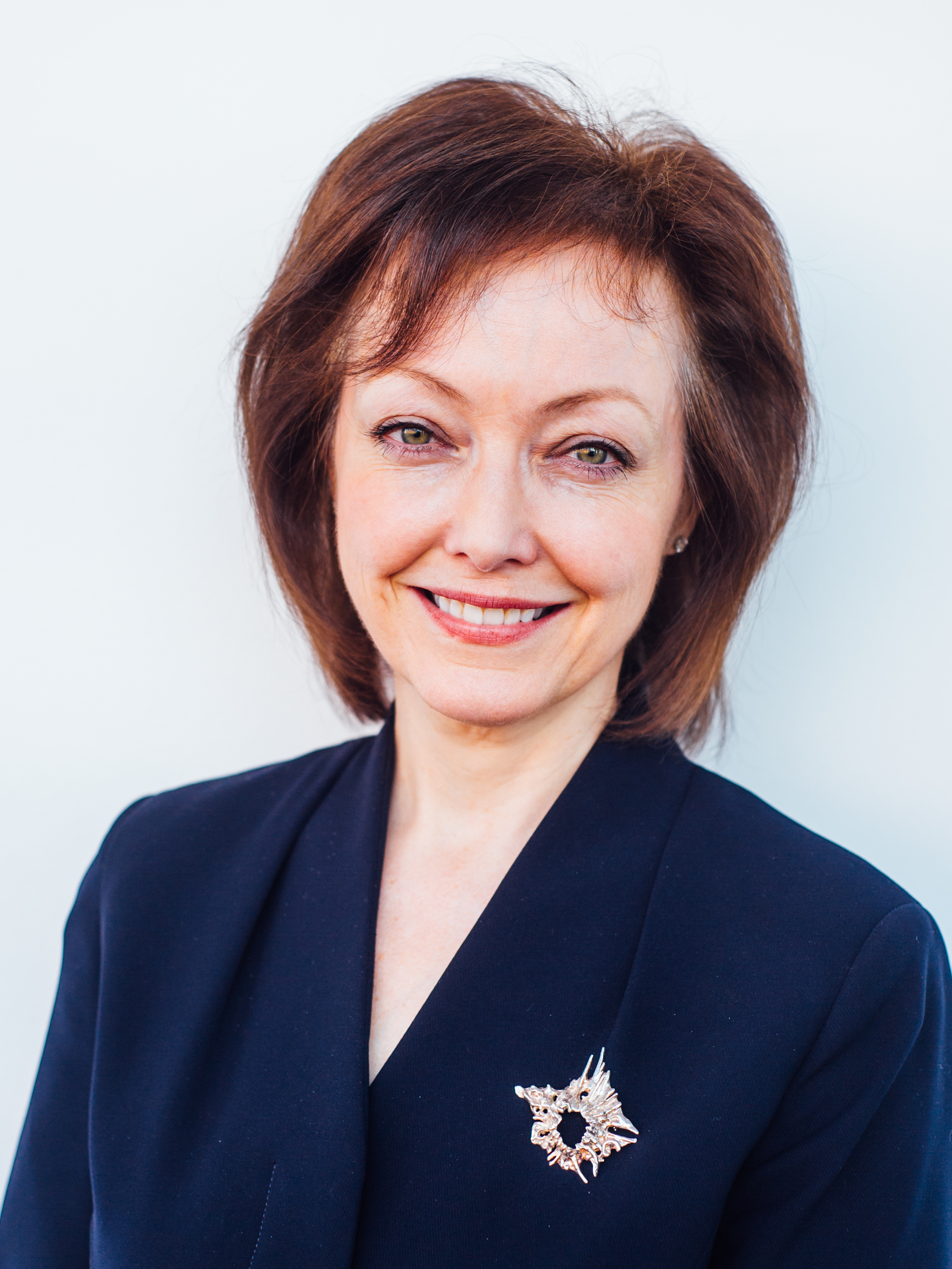
- Official portrait, 2019
- Born: Manon Bonner Jenkins; 15 April 1965 (age 61); Cardiff, Wales
- Other name: Manon Bonner Williams
- Education: St John's College, Cambridge
- Occupation: Civil servant
- Employer: Senedd
- Parent(s): Emyr Jenkins; Myra Jenkins
- Relatives: Ffion Hague (sister)

Manon Bonner Antoniazzi LVO (née Jenkins, previously Williams; born 15 April 1965) is a Welsh senior civil servant. Since April 2017 she has occupied the position of Chief Executive and Clerk of the Senedd. Previously she held the position of Chief Executive Officer of Visit Wales within the Welsh Government.

== Early life and education ==
Antoniazzi was born Manon Bonner Jenkins on 15 April 1965. She was born in Cardiff and is the eldest daughter of Emyr and Myra Jenkins. Her father was a television presenter, director of the Eisteddfod, and the chief executive of the Arts Council of Wales. Her mother, Myra Jenkins was a Welsh tutor and magistrate. She has a younger sister, Ffion Hague, who is a Welsh broadcaster, author, and former civil servant. Both she and her sister were musically talented.

Antoniazzi was a pupil at Ysgol Llanhari, a Welsh-medium school for ages 3 to 18 in the village of Llanharry, Rhondda Cynon Taf, Wales. She attended St John's College, Cambridge, from 1983 to 1989. In 1990 she was awarded a PhD in Medieval Welsh Literature from the University of Cambridge; her thesis was entitled Aspects of the Welsh prophetic verse tradition in the Middle Ages: incorporating textual studies of poetry from Llyfr Coch Hergest and Y Cwta Cyfarwydd. A copy is held by the National Library of Wales.

== Career ==
She started as a Press Officer at Welsh Water plc, and became Head of Press and Public Relations at S4C in 1991. Antoniazzi was a member of the royal household of the Prince of Wales, where she served as a senior Private Secretary for Wales. She first took up her post in 1994, departing in 1998, but returned to the household in 2004 until 2012. During her time in that role, she helped Charles, Prince of Wales, become more involved in Welsh life by purchasing Llwynywermod, his first property in Wales. She also gave Prince William Welsh lessons.

In 1998 she was appointed Director of Communication Services at the National Assembly for Wales. She joined the BBC Wales in 2000 as Secretary and Head of Public Affairs, late becoming Director of Nations and Regions. She was also the chairman of The Prince's Trust, Cymru from 2001 to 2004.

In January 2012 she joined the Board of the Heritage Lottery Fund as Deputy Chair and Chair of the Committee for Wales.

She became the Chief Executive Officer of Visit Wales within the Welsh Government in 2012. Antoniazzi was appointed Chief Executive and Clerk to the National Assembly for Wales, assuming this position in April 2017 with a salary of £125,170.

She has been on the advisory council of the London Philharmonic Orchestra and a director from 22 May 2012 until 11 August 2016. She has been governor of the Royal Shakespeare Company and a member of the advisory boards of the Philharmonia Orchestra and Welsh National Opera. Since August 2018 Antoniazzi has been on the board of directors of the Royal Welsh College of Music & Drama, and is the Deputy Chair. She was appointed a trustee of the Strata Florida Trust in November 2021.

== Honours ==
In the 1998 Queen's Birthday Honours, Antoniazzi was appointed a Member of the Royal Victorian Order (MVO). In the 2012 Birthday Honours, she was promoted to a Lieutenant of the Royal Victorian Order (LVO).

== Personal life ==
Her first marriage was to the Welsh baritone opera singer Jeremy Huw Williams on 18 September 1991 at St John's College Chapel, Cambridge. The couple had one daughter. The marriage ended in divorce.

In 2014 she was married for a second time, to John Antoniazzi. They live in Cardiff.

Senedd
Preceded by Claire Clancy	Chief Executive and Clerk to the Senedd Cymru; 2017–present	Incumbent
