= Peter Black (Welsh politician) =

Welsh politician

Cllr Peter Black CBE
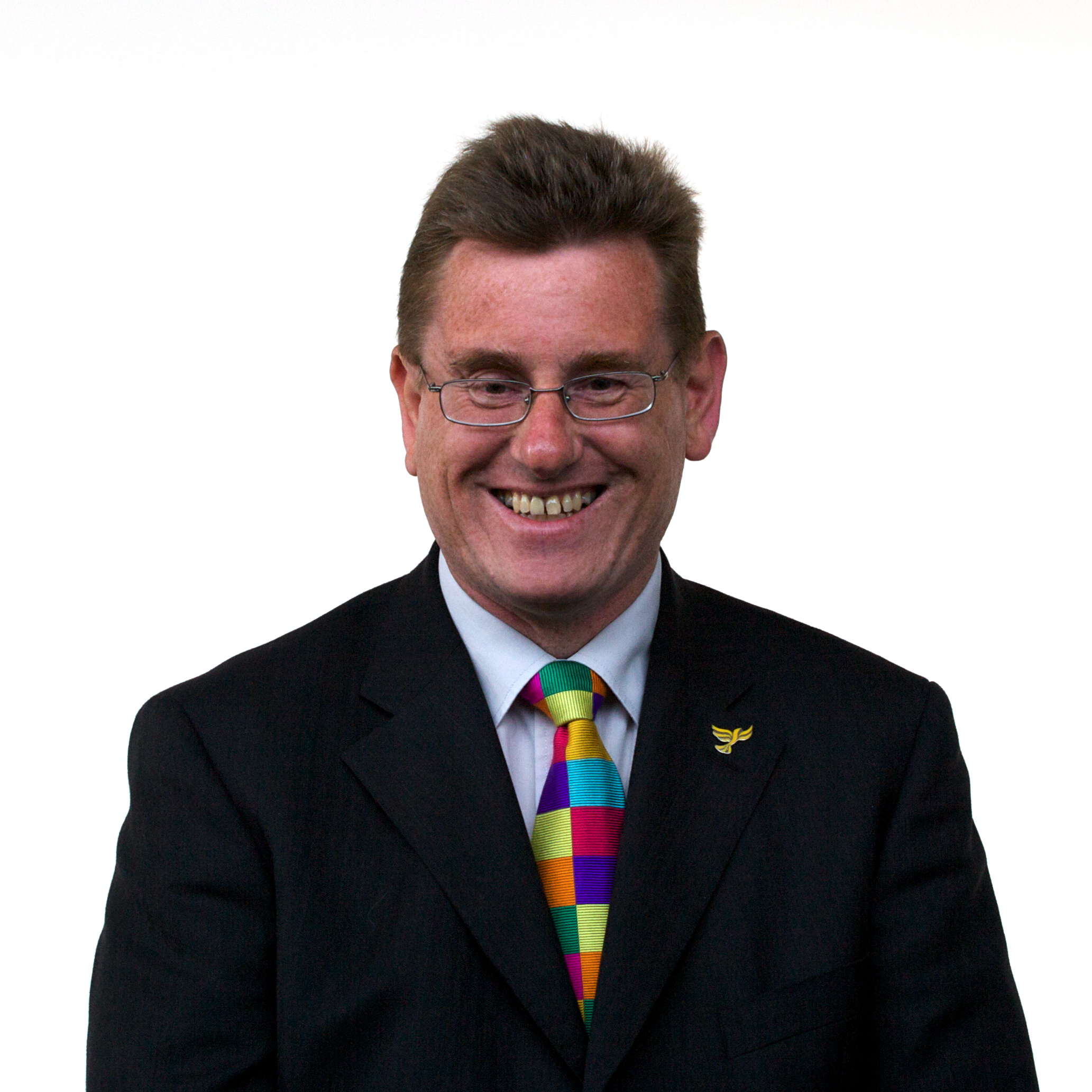

Member of the Welsh Assembly for South Wales West
- In office 6 May 1999 – 6 April 2016
- Preceded by: New post
- Succeeded by: Caroline Jones

Lord Mayor of Swansea
- In office 2019–2020

Deputy Minister for Local Government
- In office 17 October 2000 – 1 May 2003
- First Minister: Rhodri Morgan
- Preceded by: New post
- Succeeded by: Post reorganised

Personal details
- Born: 30 January 1960 (age 66) Clatterbridge, the Wirral, Cheshire, England
- Party: Welsh Liberal Democrats
- Education: Swansea University
- Occupation: Civil servant

Peter Malcolm Black CBE (born 30 January 1960) is a Welsh Liberal Democrat politician, and was a Member of the Welsh Assembly for the South Wales West Region between 1999 and 2016.

== Political career ==
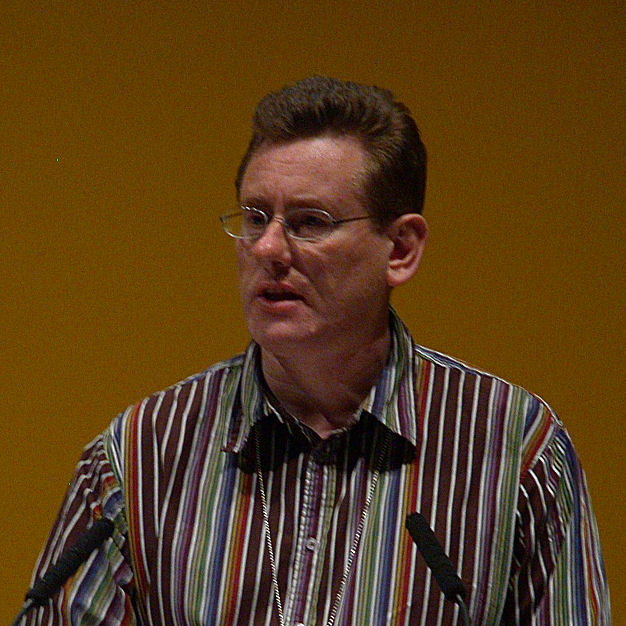
Peter Black addressing the 2008 Liberal Democrat conference in the ACC Liverpool

A Councillor for the Cwmbwrla ward on City and County of Swansea Council, he was leader of the Liberal Democrat Group 1984–99. He is a past chair of the Welsh Liberal Democrats and of the party's Finance and Administration Committee.

=== Member of the Welsh Assembly (1999-2016) ===
Black fought Swansea East at the Assembly elections in 1999 and 2003, but entered the Assembly as the lead candidate on the Welsh Liberal Democrat regional list for South Wales West. He was the lead candidate again in 2007 and 2011. A former deputy minister in the 2000–03 Labour / Welsh Liberal Democrat coalition administration, he chaired the Education, Lifelong Learning and Skills Committee in the second Assembly and then sat on the Communities, Equality and Local Government Committee and the Finance Committee. He was also a member of the Assembly Commission with responsibility for ICT and Sustainability.

In November 2011 he took the lead alongside Welsh Liberal Democrats Leader, Kirsty Williams in negotiating an agreement with Labour on the Welsh Government's budget. As a result, the Government introduced a Pupil Deprivation Grant, guaranteeing Welsh schools an extra £450 for each pupil in receipt of free school meals.

In 2013 he led for the Liberal Democrats on the negotiations for the Assembly budget alongside Plaid Cymru, securing a £100 million package including a doubling of the Pupil Deprivation Grant to £918 per pupil, a £50m intermediate health fund, £9.5m for investment in innovation in the health service and £5.5m for supporting people budgets.

He also steered the Welsh Assembly's first private member's bill to the statute book under its new powers. The Mobile Homes (Wales) Act 2013 received Royal Assent in November 2013, introducing a modern licensing regime for Park Homes sites in Wales.

On 10 December 2013 he was selected as the ITV Wales Yearbook Assembly Member of the year.

At the 2016 Welsh Assembly election, the Liberal Democrats lost all but one of their seats, with Black having unsuccessfully headed the party list in South Wales West.

=== Subsequent activity ===
After his election defeat he became the Welsh Liberal Democrats Spokesperson for Local Government, Heritage and Housing.

He was appointed Commander of the Order of the British Empire in the 2017 Birthday Honours.

== Offices held ==
Senedd
| Preceded by New post | Assembly Member for South Wales West; 1999–2016 | Succeeded by Caroline Jones |
| Preceded by New post | Assembly Commission; 2007–2016 | Succeeded by TBA |
Political offices
| Preceded by New post | Deputy Minister for Local Government; 2000–2003 | Succeeded by (post reorganised) |
