= Mick Bates (Welsh politician) =

Welsh politician (1947–2022)

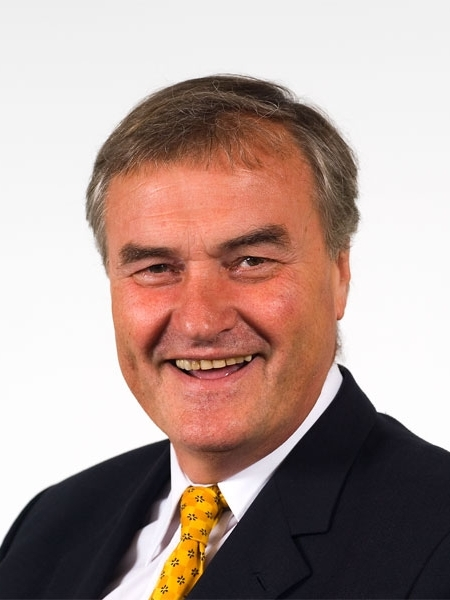
- Official portrait, 2007

Member of the Welsh Assembly for Montgomeryshire
- In office 6 May 1999 – 5 May 2011
- Preceded by: New Assembly
- Succeeded by: Russell George

Personal details
- Born: 24 September 1947 Loughborough, England
- Died: 29 August 2022 (aged 74)
- Party: Independent (2010–2011); Welsh Liberal Democrat (until 2010)

Mick Bates (24 September 1947 – 29 August 2022) was a Welsh politician who was a Member of the Welsh Assembly (AM) for Montgomeryshire from 1999 to 2011. Bates was a member of the Welsh Liberal Democrats, before serving out the rest of his term as an independent.

== Background ==
Bates first worked as a science teacher at Humphrey Perkins Junior High School, Barrow on Soar; then at Belvidere Secondary School, Shrewsbury, from 1970 to 1975; he became head of general science at The Grove School, Market Drayton, 1975–77. In 1977 he left teaching to become a farmer and took up campaigning on behalf of agriculture and rural communities. Bates was chairman of the National Farmers Union (NFU) Llanfair Caereinion Branch from 1983 to 1985 and Chairman of the County Livestock Committee, 1988–1991. He instigated and chaired the NFU County Public Affairs Committee in 1990 and was the NFU County chairman in 1991.

In 1994 Bates became involved in local politics as a Liberal Democrat County Councillor for Dyffryn Banw, where he started a community regeneration scheme as Chairman of the Llanfair Town Forum, which successfully obtained Market Towns Initiative status. He also produced and presented the Radio Maldwyn farming programme and organised a scheme for students to visit farms from 1994–5. He was an NFU elected delegate 1995. He was founding Chair of Primestock Producers Cymru, a national farmers cooperative, and also helped to found Montgomeryshire Rural Enterprises in 1997. In 1999 Bates was elected as Welsh Assembly Member for Montgomeryshire. He announced in the summer of 2009 his intention to retire at the 2011 election.

On 10 December 2010, Bates was convicted of three counts of common assault and public disorder, while drunk, having punched a paramedic on 20 January 2010, and was ordered to pay fines, compensation, and costs totalling £5,490. The Welsh Liberal Democrats began proceedings to terminate his membership of the party. Bates resigned from the party before the Welsh Liberal Democrats could convene a committee of enquiry and served the remaining months of his term of office in the Assembly as an independent. He did not stand for re-election.

Bates died from cancer on 29 August 2022, at the age of 74.

== National Assembly ==
While in the Assembly, Bates campaigned for extra money for rural schools and to put major road schemes into the Welsh Government Transport Plan, including the Newtown bypass, Buttington improvements, the Four Crosses bypass, and the Glandyfi bends.

He also promoted and secured free school milk for key stage one students in Wales, helped to establish the Small Schools Fund, and wrote a Biomass Strategy based on a local project in Llanwddyn to provide heat and hot water for the school and surrounding houses.

On agriculture, Bates designed the unique concept of Farming Connect, a free business advisory service to help farmers throughout Wales. He campaigned successfully for the creation of an independent appeals panel to resolve subsidy disputes.

The environment was an important issue for Bates, and he was a founder member of the cross party National Assembly Sustainable Energy Group (NASEG) which sought to promote the development of a sustainable energy industry in Wales.

== Committee membership ==
- Chair of the Sustainability Committee 2007–2010
- Member of the Rural Development Committee 2007–2010
- Member of Legislation Committee no.5 2008–2009
- Member of the proposed Environmental Protection and Waste Management LCO Committee 2007–2008
- Chair of the Mid & West Wales Regional Committee 2007
- Member of the Environment, Planning and Countryside Committee 2003–2007
- Member of the Mid Wales Regional Committee 2003–2005
- Member of the Economic Development Committee 2002–2003
- Chair of the Legislation Committee 2000–2003
- Member of the Environment, Planning and Transport Committee 2000–2001
- Member of the Mid Wales Regional Committee 1999–2003
- Member of the Agriculture and Rural Development Committee 1999–2002

== Offices held ==
Senedd
Preceded by (new post)	Assembly Member for Montgomeryshire; 1999–2011	Succeeded by Russell George
