= Frontbench Team of Nick Bourne =

Welsh Conservatives frontbench team (1999–2007)

- Frontbench Team of the National Assembly for Wales
- August 1999–July 2007
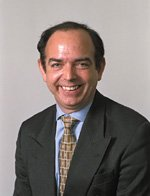
- Bourne's official portrait, c. 2000
- Date formed: 18–25 August 1999
- Date dissolved: 19 July 2007

People and organisations
- Leader: Nick Bourne
- Member party: Welsh Conservatives
- Status in legislature: Opposition party 9 / 60 (15%) (1999) 8 / 60 (13%) (2000) 11 / 60 (18%) (2003) 12 / 60 (20%) (2007)

History
- Legislature terms: 1st National Assembly for Wales; 2nd National Assembly for Wales; 3rd National Assembly for Wales
- Predecessor: Frontbench Team of Rod Richards
- Successor: Shadow Cabinet of Nick Bourne

Nick Bourne, the leader of the Welsh Conservative Group in the National Assembly for Wales, formed his frontbench team of party spokespeople between 18 August and 25 August 1999 after he was elected unopposed to succeed Rod Richards as group leader on 18 August, having already served as acting leader since 11 August. He made a minor reshuffle to his frontbench team in 2000 and made further changes to the team after the 2003 and 2007 National Assembly elections. Bourne's party became the official opposition after the One Wales coalition was formed in July 2007, with Bourne leading a shadow cabinet as the leader of the opposition.

== Background ==
Nick Bourne contested the 1998 Welsh Conservatives leadership election with Rod Richards to become leader of the Welsh Conservative Group in the National Assembly for Wales after its establishment in 1999. At the first assembly election in May 1999, Bourne was elected as the assembly member (AM) for Mid and West Wales. The Conservatives returned nine AMs in total and it became the third-largest party in the assembly behind the official opposition Plaid Cymru and the governing Labour Party.

On 11 August 1999, Bourne was elected by the Welsh Conservative Group to serve as its acting leader after Richards' temporary resignation and his appointment of deputy leader David TC Davies as acting leader earlier that month following accusations of assault which he was later cleared of in 2000, a move which was opposed by the other members of the group. Richards resigned in a permanent capacity in response and on 18 August Bourne was elected unopposed as his successor.

== History ==
On his election as leader on 18 August 1999, Bourne appointed David TC Davies to his frontbench team as policy director after praising him for his conduct during the leadership election. He formed the rest of his frontbench team on 25 August, keeping Davies as the group's chief whip while abolishing his deputy leadership position and making him the new spokesperson for environment, transport and planning. Davies also lost his role as group business manager to William Graham, who became the new business manager. Peter Rodgers, the previous spokesperson for environment, transport and planning, became the spokesperson for agriculture and rural affairs. His predecessor Glyn Davies became the new spokesperson for finance, which was the portfolio previously held by Bourne before he became leader. Alun Cairns, David Melding and Jonathan Morgan retained their previous positions in the frontbench as spokesperson for economic development and Europe, spokesperson for health and social services and spokesperson for education respectively. Previous leader Rod Richards was not given a post in Bourne's new frontbench team, making him the only Conservative AM to serve as a backbencher.

A minor reshuffle occurred in 2000, with David TC Davies losing his role as policy director to David Melding, a role which he kept until 2011. In the same year, former leader Rod Richards was suspended from the Welsh Conservative Group for voting against the party whip in a budget vote in 1999. He served as an independent conservative in the assembly for the remainder of his term.

At the 2003 National Assembly for Wales election, Bourne's Welsh Conservatives increased its share of the seats in the assembly from 9 to 11. However, it remained the third-largest party behind the official opposition Plaid Cymru which had 12 seats and the governing party Welsh Labour which had 30 seats. Bourne reshuffled his frontbench team alongside the other opposition parties as First Minister Rhodri Morgan formed his new cabinet on 8 May 2003. All but one member of the Welsh Conservative Group were given portfolios, including Alun Cairns who became spokesperson for economic development and transport, David TC Davies who became spokesperson for education and lifelong learning, Glyn Davies who became spokesperson for local government, environment and planning, Lisa Francis who became spokesperson for Welsh language and culture, William Graham who became spokesperson for social justice and chief whip, Mark Isherwood who became spokesperson for finance, Laura Anne Jones who became spokesperson for sport, Jonathan Morgan who became business manager and spokesperson for health and social services, and Brynle Williams who became spokesperson for farming and rural development. David Melding was the only Welsh Conservative AM without a role in the frontbench team, as he decided to move to the backbenches to focus on his campaign for a federal United Kingdom and further devolution to the National Assembly. He rejoined the frontbench in November 2004, when he took over from Jonathan Morgan as business manager, and in 2005 he returned to his post as policy director.

At the 2007 National Assembly for Wales election in May 2007, the Welsh Conservatives increased its share of assembly seats from 11 to 12. Bourne made another reshuffle of his frontbench team in June, with Alun Cairns losing his economic development and transport portfolio and becoming the new spokesperson for education. Policy director David Melding became the new spokesperson for economic development while Nick Ramsay became spokesperson for local government. Darren Millar became spokesperson for environment and planning and Paul Davies became spokesperson for culture, sport and the Welsh language. Angela Burns and Andrew RT Davies became spokesperson for finance and spokesperson for transport. Jonathan Morgan remained spokesperson for health and social services while Byrnle Williams and Mark Isherwood became spokesperson for rural affairs and spokesperson for social justice, equality and housing. William Graham remained chief whip and became business manager and chair of the Welsh Conservative Group. After the formation of the One Wales government in July 2007, the Welsh Conservatives became the official opposition to Labour and Plaid Cymru's coalition government, with Bourne becoming the leader of the opposition and his team in the assembly becoming the new shadow cabinet.

== Members ==
=== August 1999–May 2003 ===
Portfolio	Spokesperson	Constituency	Term
Leader of the Welsh Conservative Group	Nick Bourne AM	Mid and West Wales	1999–2011
Welsh Conservative Group Business Manager	William Graham AM	South Wales East	1999–2003
Welsh Conservative Group Chief Whip; Spokesperson for Environment, Transport and Planning	David TC Davies AM	Monmouth	1999–2003
Policy Director of the Welsh Conservative Party	David TC Davies AM	Monmouth	1999–2000
Policy Director of the Welsh Conservative Party	David Melding AM	South Wales Central	2000–2003
Spokesperson for Health and Social Services	David Melding AM	South Wales Central	1999–2003
Spokesperson for Finance	Glyn Davies AM	Mid and West Wales	1999–2003
Spokesperson for Economic Development and Europe	Alun Cairns AM	South Wales West	1999–2003
Spokesperson for Agriculture and Rural Affairs	Peter Rodgers AM	North Wales	1999–2003

==== Changes ====
- In 2000, David Melding replaced David TC Davies as policy director.
