= 1999 Welsh Conservatives leadership election =

- 11–18 August 1999

All nine members of the Welsh Conservative Group in the National Assembly for Wales Five votes needed to win
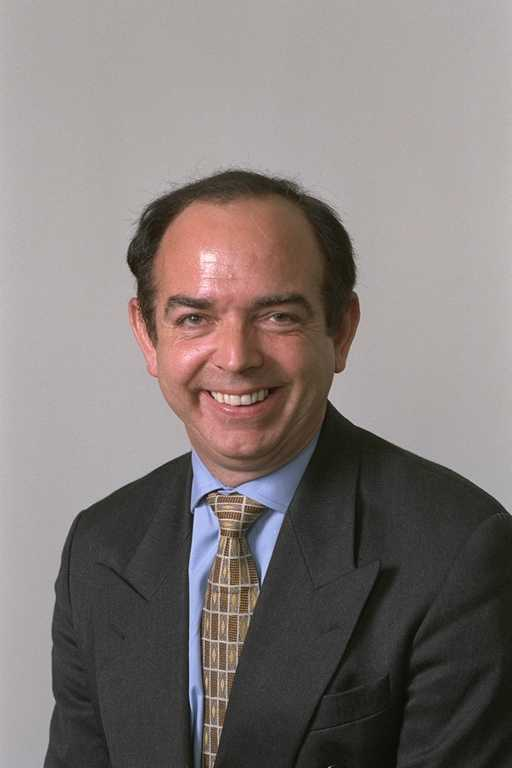
Candidate	Nick Bourne
Popular vote	Unopposed
Leader before election
Nick Bourne (pro tempore);
previously Rod Richards (Note: Richards announced his temporary resignation on 5 August, appointing his deputy David TC Davies to serve as acting leader until his return. This was overruled at a meeting of the Welsh Conservative Group and senior Welsh Conservatives on 10 August, with Nick Bourne elected to serve as acting leader instead. Richards then announced his permanent resignation in response, stating that his leadership and authority had been "undermined" by their decision to replace Davies with Bourne, and that as a result he had "no choice" but to step down.)
Elected Leader
Nick Bourne

The 1999 Welsh Conservatives leadership election was held in August 1999 to elect the leader of the Welsh Conservative Group in the National Assembly for Wales. The election was triggered by the resignation of Rod Richards after the Welsh Conservative Party failed to endorse his appointment of David TC Davies as acting leader after Richards was charged for inflicting grievous bodily harm, which he was later cleared of in 2000. Nick Bourne, who the party had appointed as acting leader in Davies' place, was elected unopposed as the new leader of the Welsh Conservative Group in the National Assembly as the only candidate nominated for the leadership by group members.

Richards, seen as the more radical candidate, had defeated Bourne, seen as the more moderate candidate, at the previous leadership election in 1998. After Richards was charged for inflicting grievous bodily harm in August 1999, he stood down temporarily as leader and appointed Davies, who was seen as his protégé, as acting leader on 5 August. This appointment was overruled by a meeting of senior party figures with the other, more moderate group members on 10 August, with Bourne elected as acting leader of the group in Davies' place. Richards then resigned permanently, with Bourne elected unopposed as the new leader on 18 August. As leader, he moved the Welsh Conservative Party in a more moderate direction, changing its stance to accept devolution and developing a distinctly Welsh approach for the party. The next leadership election would be held in 2011 after he lost his seat at the 2011 National Assembly for Wales election. His successor Andrew RT Davies continued his strategy of making the party more supportive of devolution but also adopted a more populist approach as leader.

== Background ==
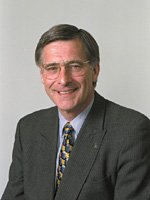
Rod Richards was elected leader of the Welsh Conservative Group in the National Assembly for Wales in 1998

Before 1997, the Conservative Party in Wales had little independence from the UK party, both in the context of policy-making and identity. In the 1990s, the party campaigned against the Labour Party's proposals to introduce a devolved legislature for Wales, arguing that this would lead to the breakup of the United Kingdom. After Labour's landslide victory in the 1997 general election, the new Labour government decided to hold a devolution referendum in Wales in September 1997, which returned a narrow majority in favour of devolution. Following the referendum, UK Conservative party leader William Hague instituted constitutional reforms to democratize the party in 1998, reorganising the party in Wales as the Welsh Conservative Party and giving it limited autonomy from the wider UK party.

In October and November 1998, a leadership election was held in the Welsh Conservative Party to elect the leader of the Welsh Conservative Group in the National Assembly for Wales ahead of the first assembly election in 1999. Two candidates stood for the position. Academic Nick Bourne, the party's chief spokesman for Wales and a leader of the unsuccessful Just Say NO campaign in the 1997 Welsh devolution referendum, was widely seen as the preferred candidate of UK party leader William Hague and was considered the more moderate candidate, cautiously accepting the implementation of devolution. Former MP Rod Richards, known for his combative style of politics and anti-devolutionist views, was seen as the more radical right-wing Thatcherite candidate. Richards was elected leader of the Welsh Conservative Group by the Welsh party membership and became the first to serve in this position after the assembly's creation in 1999. However, his relationship with Bourne became strained as a result of the election.

Under Rod Richards' leadership, the Welsh Conservatives adopted a strategy of opposing devolution and emphasising British identity. Richards led the party into the first assembly election, where the Conservatives won enough seats to become the third-largest party behind Plaid Cymru. This was disappointing for the party, which won nine seats but had expected beforehand to become the second-largest party behind Labour instead. Richards announced his frontbench team shortly after. All nine Conservative assembly members (AMs) were given portfolios, with his campaign manager David TC Davies becoming his deputy leader and the party's chief whip and Bourne becoming the party's spokesperson for finance. As leader of the Welsh Conservative Group in the National Assembly for Wales, Richards eschewed the more collaborative and consensual style of politics envisioned for the assembly and instead adopted an oppositional approach toward its other parties.

== Richards' resignation ==
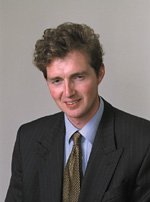
Richards appointed his deputy David TC Davies as acting leader after his temporary resignation

Two months into his leadership in the assembly, Richards was arrested and charged for inflicting grievous bodily harm to a 22-year-old woman in Kew, London, on 22 July 1999. He was released on bail, pending a court hearing on 8 September. Richards denied the charges but left his role as leader of the Welsh Conservative Group on 5 August for a temporary period to focus on his defence, promising to return once he had proved his innocence. Richards appointed David TC Davies, who was his deputy leader, as acting leader to lead the group in his absence. Considered to be his protégé, Richards wanted Davies to serve as his successor should he officially resign from the leadership and he tried to prevent Bourne from succeeding him instead.

The appointment of Davies as acting leader, who was 29 years old at the time, proved controversial with other members of the Welsh Conservative Group, who claimed he was "too inexperienced" to lead the party. According to The Independent, some members of the group were thought to have preferred to install Bourne as acting leader instead. The other members of the group were more moderate than Davies and Richards, and Bourne's supporters in the group thought it was time for the party to move in a more moderate direction under Bourne as the new leader. A leadership election within the group to determine whether to re-elect Richards as leader had already been scheduled for November, but his premature temporary resignation meant that the UK party was now considering whether to push it forward to August.

Richards' decision to appoint Davies without consulting the other members of the group angered some of its members, who favoured choosing their own leader over Davies. On 6 August, these members convened a meeting of some of the group's members, including Bourne's supporters, to discuss Davies' appointment as acting leader. The members who attended this meeting included Bourne, Alun Cairns, Jonathan Morgan, Glyn Davies and David Melding. Although the attendees agreed to favour an alternative appointment to the leadership, they could not come to a final decision on the matter. It was decided to wait until the return of the other group members including Davies from their holidays so that another meeting could be held on the issue. Richards dismissed any suggestions of infighting within the Welsh Conservative Group and claimed to enjoy "a lot of support, not just from my own group but from throughout Wales".

Another meeting was held on 10 August to determine if the Welsh Conservatives should hold an early leadership election to elect a new leader. In attendance were senior members of the Welsh Conservatives, including all members of the Welsh Conservative Group and Nigel Evans, the UK party spokesperson on Welsh affairs. Richards appealed to the other attendees of the meeting to endorse Davies as his deputy leader and as acting leader. He then left the meeting, leaving them to decide whether to endorse Davies or not. In response to the allegations against Richards, the party leadership chose to endorse Bourne for the position of acting leader rather than Davies at the meeting. This move was backed by the other members of the group, who reiterated the claim that Davies was "too inexperienced" to lead the party. The other attendees of the meeting then elected Bourne as the new acting leader. In a statement published not long after Richards' departure from the meeting, the members declared that Bourne was now the new acting leader of the group. Richards then announced his permanent resignation as leader of the Welsh Conservative Group in the National Assembly for Wales, stating that his leadership and authority had been "undermined" by their decision to replace Davies with Bourne, and that as a result he had "no choice" but to step down.

== Campaign ==
As a result of Richards' resignation, Conservative Central Office announced that a new leadership election would have to be held for the party in Wales to elect a new permanent leader of the Welsh Conservative Group. Bourne put forward his nomination for the leadership to Conservative Central Office on 11 August 1999. The party then opened the nominations process for other potential challengers to stand for the leadership. Under the nominations process, nominations had to be signed from at least three of the nine party AMs and submitted to the chief whip David TC Davies to be considered valid. According to a spokesman representing Bourne, five of the nine AMs in the Conservative Group had already signed his nomination. Henri Lloyd Davies, chair of the Welsh Conservative Party, announced that nominations would remain open for seven days. If only one candidate was nominated by the closure of nominations on 18 August, they had to have the support of at least two-thirds of party AMs before they could be elected unopposed as the new leader.

According to the South Wales Echo, Bourne was expected to be the only contender for the leadership, allowing him to be elected unopposed. The paper's political correspondent Richard Hazlewood said the nominations process was widely seen in the party as just a formality to install Bourne as the official leader of the Welsh Conservative Group. On 12 August, the South Wales Evening Post described him as the favourite to win the election. According to BBC News, he had secured the support of most of the Conservative AMs by 16 August, not including Richards or his deputy David TC Davies. On 13 August, Davies said he would support whoever was elected as the new leader, but added that he felt "disappointed" by his colleagues for claiming that he was inexperienced ahead of his dismissal as acting leader.

== Results ==
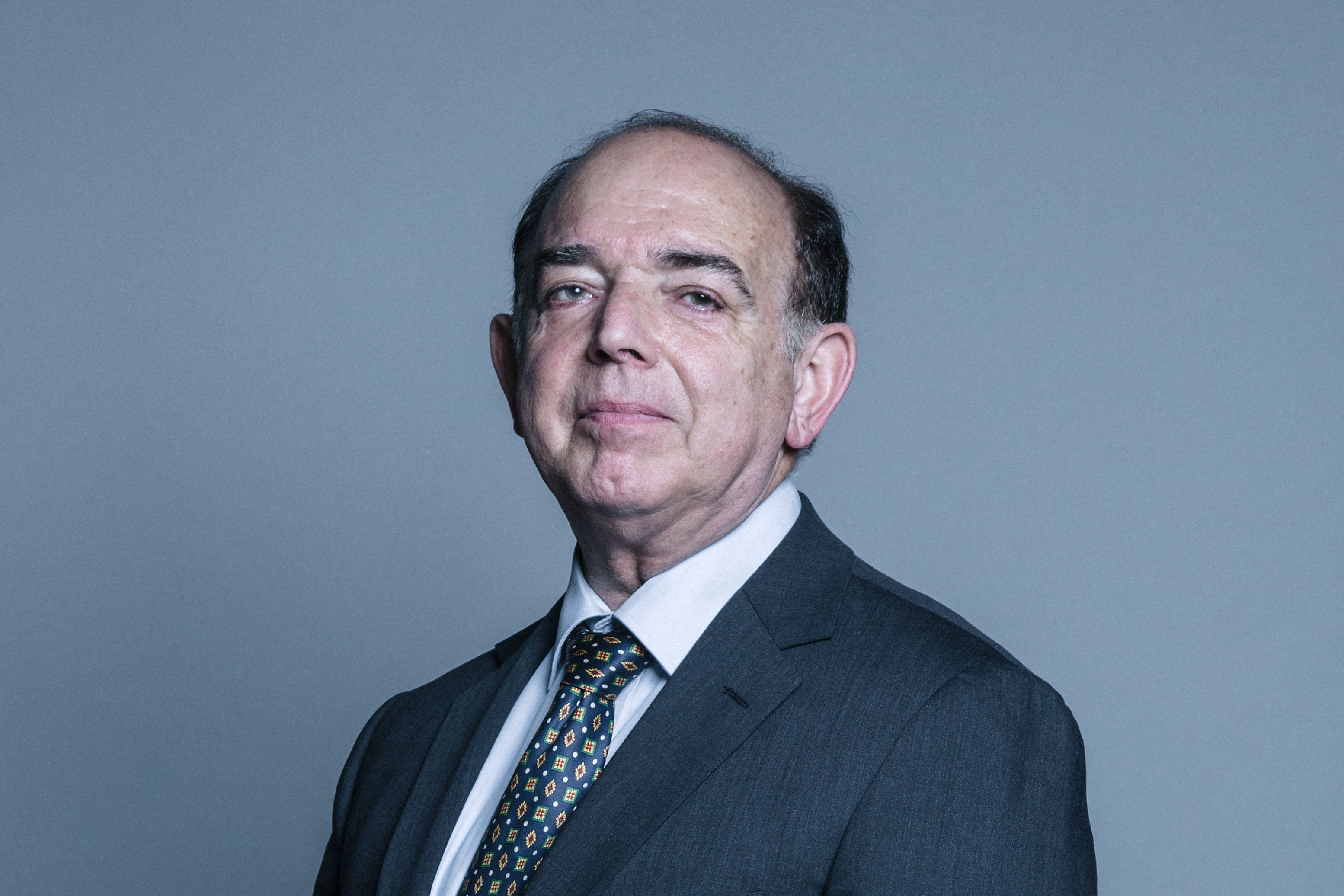
After the closure of nominations on 18 August, Nick Bourne was elected unopposed as the new leader

After the closure of nominations on 18 August, Davies as chief whip announced that Bourne was the only person nominated for the leadership. He therefore declared that Bourne was elected unopposed as leader of the Welsh Conservative Group in the National Assembly for Wales. Bourne praised Davies for his conduct during the election and gave him a new role as the member of the Welsh Conservative frontbench responsible for policy presentation. Bourne pledged to hold the Labour administration to account and to focus his party in the assembly on issues relating to farming, the Welsh NHS and European aid. He also said the Conservatives would argue "for a distinctive Welsh policy ... on all sorts of issues". He reshuffled other posts in the Conservative frontbench in the assembly on 25 August, abolishing the deputy leadership post held by Davies while making him the new environment spokesperson. Richards was not given a post in Bourne's new frontbench team, making him the only Conservative AM to serve as a backbencher, though Bourne promised to appoint him to it at a later date once he was cleared of his allegations of assault.

== Aftermath ==
Richards was the first of several assembly party leaders who resigned within a year of the National Assembly for Wales' creation in 1999, followed by Labour's Alun Michael and Plaid Cymru's Dafydd Wigley. These resignations reflected the instability of the newly established institution in the first year of its existence. Richards continued to serve as a Conservative backbencher in the National Assembly until February 2000, when members of the Welsh Conservative Group decided to suspend the whip from him for abstaining in a vote on a draft budget for the assembly in December; Conservative AMs were whipped to vote against the draft budget. In response to his suspension, Richards called Bourne a "prat" during an assembly session and hosted a press conference where he accused most members of the Welsh Conservative Group of having taken part in a conspiracy to remove him as leader. He defended his former deputy David TC Davies, claiming that he was not involved in the alleged conspiracy, but denounced the seven other AMs in the group as Nick Bourne's "malevolent seven", describing the meeting where they voted to suspend him as a "kangaroo court". Richards continued to sit in the assembly as an Independent Conservative before retiring from the institution in 2002, and he was cleared of all charges related to the grievous bodily harm accusations in June 2000.

Under Bourne's leadership the Conservatives in Wales, now under the control of a more moderate faction that generally accepted devolution, saw a significant change to their political strategy as compared to under Richards, with Bourne working with the Welsh Conservatives' main adviser on policy David Melding to make the party more distinctly Welsh in identity and generally supportive of devolution. The change in leadership also enabled the Welsh party to adopt a more moderate policy programme and become more collaborative with other parties in the assembly, in line with its more consensual system of politics. The party gradually moderated its policies on issues such as education and health, rejecting the calls for private outsourcing made by the Conservatives in England and calling for increased funding of public services, and came to commit itself to a distinctly Welsh approach different to that of the wider UK party. Richards opposed Bourne's reforms to the Welsh Conservatives and later criticised them in 2011 as having "achieved nothing in terms of taking the party forward. All it's about is sucking up to Plaid Cymru." Bourne continued to serve as the leader of the Welsh Conservative Group in the National Assembly for Wales until he lost his seat at the 2011 assembly election.

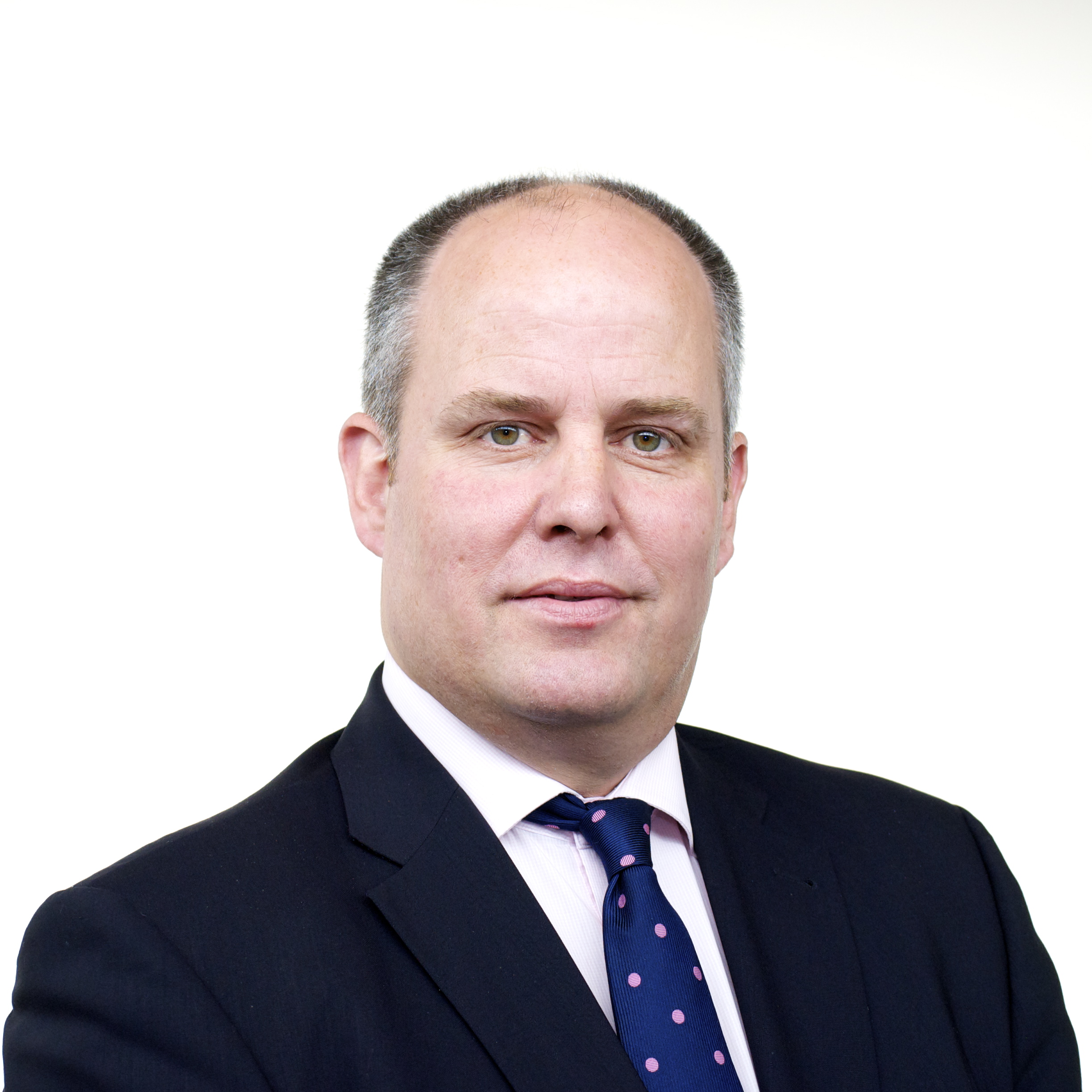
Andrew RT Davies was elected leader in 2011 and continued Bourne's strategy of supporting devolution

The events and aftermath of the leadership election led to a lasting enmity between Richards and Bourne which caused a factional split in the Welsh Conservative Group between those who supported Bourne and the more Eurosceptic AMs in the group; this spilled over into the 2001 UK Conservative Party leadership election, with Bourne's faction supporting the more pro-European candidate Kenneth Clarke and the other faction supporting the more Eurosceptic candidate Iain Duncan Smith. The next Welsh Conservatives leadership election would be held in 2011, with Andrew RT Davies defeating Nick Ramsay to succeed Bourne as leader of the Welsh Conservative Group. Davies continued Bourne's strategy of making the Welsh party more supportive of devolution but also took on a more populist approach.

== See also ==
- 1999 Welsh Labour leadership election
- Welsh Liberal Democrats inaugural Assembly group election
