= Frontbench Team of Rod Richards =

Welsh Conservatives frontbench team (1999)

- Frontbench Team of the National Assembly for Wales
- May–August 1999
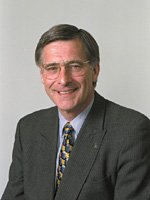
- Date formed: 13 May 1999
- Date dissolved: 10 August 1999

People and organisations
- Leader: Rod Richards
- Deputy Leader: David TC Davies
- Member party: Welsh Conservatives
- Status in legislature: Opposition party 9 / 60 (15%)

History
- Legislature term: 1st National Assembly for Wales
- Predecessor: Assembly established
- Successor: Frontbench Team of Nick Bourne

Rod Richards, the leader of the Welsh Conservative Group in the National Assembly for Wales, formed his frontbench team of party spokespeople on 13 May 1998. Richards had led his party into the 1999 National Assembly for Wales election after being elected as leader of the Welsh Conservative Group in 1998.

== History ==
In 1997, Tony Blair's UK Labour Party secured a landslide victory in the 1997 general election and entered government on a manifesto of holding a devolution referendum in Wales to determine whether to establish a devolved assembly for Wales. The Conservative Party under John Major and William Hague opposed devolution and campaigned for a No vote in the 1997 Welsh devolution referendum held in September 1997, which returned a narrow majority in favour of establishing such an assembly. Following the referendum, the Conservative Party in Wales was reorganised as the Welsh Conservative Party and given limited autonomy from the wider UK party. A leadership election was held in 1998 to elect the leader of the Welsh Conservative Group in the National Assembly for Wales ahead of the first assembly election in 1999.

Former MP Rod Richards, known for his combative style of politics and anti-devolutionist views, was elected leader of the Welsh Conservative Group by the Welsh party membership and became the first person to serve in this position after the assembly's creation in 1999.

The Welsh Conservatives went into the first assembly election in May 1999 on a platform of unionism and devo-scepticism. The party expected to become the official opposition in the assembly, winning the second-most seats behind the Labour Party in Wales led by Alun Michael. Richards launched his party's election campaign at a press conference in April 1999, where he announced the members of his planned shadow cabinet in advance of the election result. Most appointees to the planned shadow cabinet were Conservative candidates in South Wales. Controversially, Richards did not appoint Bourne to the planned shadow cabinet, nor did he appoint any women. This was seen as evidence of the continued strain in the two men's relationship since the leadership election.

At the first assembly election on 6 May 1999, the Welsh Conservatives won enough seats to become the third-largest party behind Plaid Cymru, which became the official opposition to Alun Michael's Labour administration. The party performed below its own expectations. It only won nine seats in the assembly, with several appointees to Richards' planned shadow cabinet failing to successfully win an assembly seat. Under the political system of the assembly, only the official opposition, in this case Plaid Cymru, could form the Shadow Cabinet of Wales. Other opposition parties in the assembly, including the Conservatives, could appoint frontbench teams of party spokespeople. Like members of the shadow cabinet, frontbenchers were given portfolios which generally matched the duties of devolved government ministers in the assembly administration.

Richards formed his frontbench team of party spokespeople on 13 May 1998, on the same day as Mike German's Welsh Liberal Democrats. All nine assembly members (AMs) from the Welsh Conservative Group were given frontbench roles, including Richards' leadership rival Nick Bourne, who became the party's spokesperson for finance. David TC Davies, Richards' campaign manager, was appointed deputy leader of the Welsh Conservative Group and as the group's business manager and chief whip. Other appointments included William Graham as deputy business manager, Alun Cairns as spokesperson for economic development and Europe, David Melding as spokesperson for health and social services, Jonathan Morgan as spokesperson for education, Glyn Davies as spokesperson for agriculture and Peter Rodgers as spokesperson for environment, transport and planning.

== Members ==
Portfolio	Spokesperson	Constituency	Term
Leader of the Welsh Conservative Group	Rod Richards AM (Note: Richards appointed David TC Davies as acting leader in August 1999 but this appointment was later overruled at a meeting of the Welsh Conservative Group and other senior Welsh Conservatives, with Nick Bourne made acting leader instead; this led Richards to announce his permanent resignation as Welsh party leader.)	North Wales	May 1999–August 1999
Deputy Leader of the Welsh Conservative Group; Welsh Conservative Group Business Manager; Welsh Conservative Group Chief Whip	David TC Davies AM	Monmouth	May 1999–August 1999
Welsh Conservative Group Deputy Business Manager	William Graham AM	South Wales East	May 1999–August 1999
Spokesperson for Finance	Nick Bourne AM	Mid and West Wales	May 1999–August 1999
Spokesperson for Economic Development and Europe	Alun Cairns AM	South Wales West	May 1999–August 1999
Spokesperson for Health and Social Services	David Melding AM	South Wales Central	May 1999–August 1999
Spokesperson for Education	Jonathan Morgan AM	South Wales Central	May 1999–August 1999
Spokesperson for Agriculture and the Rural Economy	Glyn Davies AM	Mid and West Wales	May 1999–August 1999
Spokesperson for Environment, Transport and Planning	Peter Rodgers AM	North Wales	May 1999–August 1999
