= 2021 Welsh Conservatives leadership election =

- 23–24 January 2021
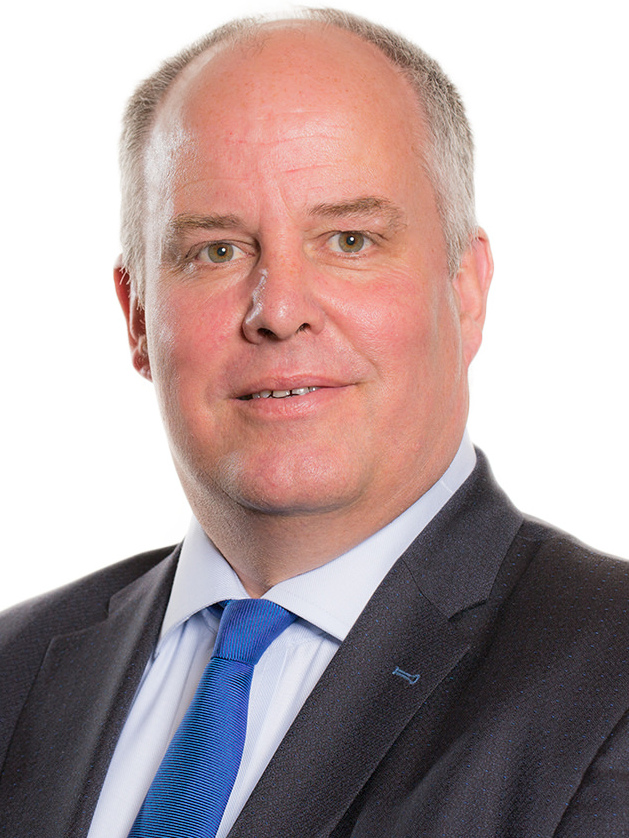
Candidate	Andrew RT Davies
Percentage	Unopposed
Leader before election
Paul Davies
Elected Leader
Andrew RT Davies

The 2021 Welsh Conservatives leadership election was triggered on 23 January 2021 by the resignation of Paul Davies as leader of the Welsh Conservatives following a possible breach of COVID-19 regulations. Davies announced his intention to step down from the role with immediate effect after pictures emerged of a group of Senedd members, including Davies, drinking alcohol at the Senedd building during December 2020, shortly after the purchase and public consumption of alcohol had been banned in Wales as one of the COVID restrictions. His resignation occurred a few months before the scheduled 2021 Senedd election.

Davies' colleague, Darren Millar, who was also among the group, announced he would be stepping down from his role with immediate effect.

There was a short discussion between Conservative Members of the Senedd the following day where they gave their unanimous support for Andrew RT Davies to become leader.
