= 1998 Welsh Conservatives leadership election =

30 October – 10 November 1998	1999 →
- Turnout: 6,707 (49%)
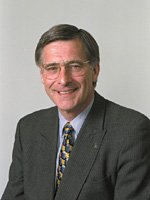

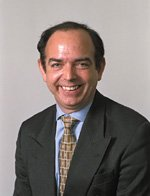
Candidate	Rod Richards	Nick Bourne
Popular vote	3,873	2,798
Percentage	57.8%	41.7%
Leader before election
N/A (Nick Bourne as chief party spokesman in Wales)
Elected Leader
Rod Richards

The 1998 Welsh Conservatives leadership election was held in October and November 1998 to elect the first leader of the Welsh Conservative Group in the National Assembly for Wales ahead of the first assembly election in 1999. The election was won by Rod Richards, who defeated challenger Nick Bourne.

== Results ==
Candidate	Votes	Percentage	Turnout
Rod Richards	3,873	57.8%	6,707 (49%)
Nick Bourne	2,798	41.7%	6,707 (49%)
N/A (spoilt vote)	36	0.5%	6,707 (49%)

The result of the election was announced on 10 November 1998 at the Village Hotel in Coryton, Cardiff. A total of 6,707 ballots were returned with an overall voter turnout of 49%. Richards won the election with 3,873 votes, a majority of 1,075 over Bourne who won 2,798 votes. 36 ballots were spoiled.

== See also ==
- 1998 Welsh Labour leadership election
- Welsh Liberal Democrats inaugural Assembly group election
- 1998 Scottish Conservative Party leadership election
