= Ann Jones (politician) =

Welsh Labour Co-operative politician and Member of the Senedd for Vale of Clwyd

Ann Jones OBE
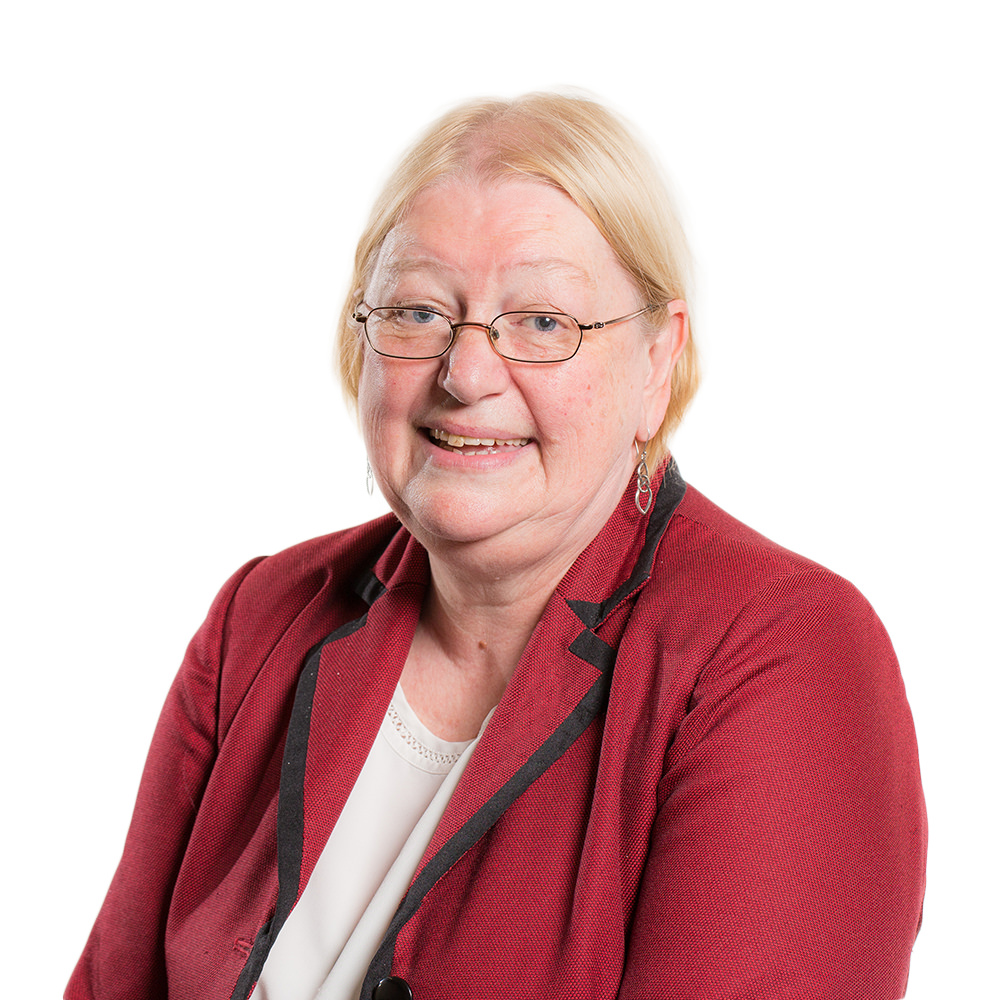
- Jones in 2016

Welsh Labour representative on the National Executive Committee of the Labour Party
- Incumbent
- Assumed office September 2024
- Preceded by: Carwyn Jones

Dirprwy Lywydd of the Senedd
- In office 11 May 2016 – 6 May 2021
- Preceded by: David Melding
- Succeeded by: David Rees

Member of the Senedd for Vale of Clwyd
- In office 6 May 1999 – 29 April 2021
- Preceded by: Office Created
- Succeeded by: Gareth Davies
- Majority: 768 (3.1%)

Personal details
- Born: 4 November 1953 (age 73) Rhyl, Wales
- Party: Welsh Labour Co-operative
- Spouse: Adrian Jones (d. 2020)
- Children: Victoria & Vincent
- Committees: Children and Young People, Finance & Scrutiny of the First Minister
- Website: annjones.org.uk

Margaret Ann Jones OBE (born 4 November 1953) is a Welsh Labour Co-operative politician. Born in Rhyl, Denbighshire, Jones was the Member of the Senedd (MS) for Vale of Clwyd from 1999 until she retired in 2021. From 11 May 2016 until her retirement, she was the Deputy Presiding Officer for the Senedd.

== Personal life ==
Margaret Ann Jones was born to Charles Jones and Helen Jones (née Sadler) in Rhyl. She was educated at Rhyl Grammar School, now known as Rhyl High School. She married Adrian Jones in 1973 and has 1 son and 1 daughter.

== Early career ==
Ann worked as an Emergency Call Officer and a number of management positions in the control room of Flintshire Fire Brigade and Clwyd Fire Brigade between 1970 and 1979 and as a Fire Control Officer with Merseyside Fire Brigade from 1991 to 1999.

Ann served as a national officer in the Fire Brigades Union for a number of years and has sat on the executive boards of the Welsh Labour Party and the Wales TUC. She is a member of UNISON and remains a 'out of trade' member of the FBU.

== Political career ==
=== Local Politics ===
Ann Jones was a member of Rhyl Town Council from 1991 to 1999, and Mayor of Rhyl in 1996–7. She was a councillor on Denbighshire County Council from 1995 to 1999 and agent for Chris Ruane MP at the 1997 General Election. She is a member of the Christian Socialist Movement.

=== Senedd ===
She was elected to the Senedd for the Vale of Clwyd in 1999, holding the seat at every Assembly Election until her retirement in 2021. She sat as a Labour member until the 2011 election after which she sat as a Labour Co-operative member.

Ann chaired several Assembly Committees including the Children, Young People and Education Committee, the All Party Group on Deaf Issues and was chair of the National Assembly Labour Group from 2011 to 2016. From 2011–2013, Jones chaired the Communities, Equalities and Local Government Committee.

Her political interests include education, tourism, community safety, regeneration, social policy and the Emergency Services. She is a fan of Rhyl Football Club.

In 2016 she was elected Deputy Presiding Officer of the National Assembly, defeating Labour Newport East AM, John Griffiths 30-29.

Jones was appointed Officer of the Order of the British Empire (OBE) in the 2021 New Year Honours for parliamentary and public service in Wales.

=== Post Senedd career ===
Jones was elected to represent North Wales constituency Labour parties on the Welsh Executive Committee in 2022 and re-elected in 2024. She was then elected to the National Executive Committee of the Labour Party in September 2024 as Welsh representative, succeeding Carwyn Jones.. She was re-elected in 2026, defeating fellow former MS Mick Antoniw. She was elected on the Labour to Win slate of moderate Labour Party members.

==== Fire Safety Measure ====
In 2007, Ann Jones won a ballot and had the opportunity to introduce the first Senedd Measure from a backbench member. Ann Jones announced her intention to introduce legislation to make it mandatory to install a fire suppression system in new homes. The process of transferring the law-making powers to the Senedd began in 2007 and in 2010 a Legislative Competence Order was made allowing the Senedd to legislate. The Domestic Fire Safety (Wales) Measure 2011 was debated in the Senedd in 2010 and 2011 before receiving Royal assent on 7 April 2011.

In 2019 Ann Jones donated a collection of papers related to the legislation to the National Library of Wales.

Senedd
Preceded by (new post)	Member of the Senedd for Vale of Clwyd; 1999–2021	Succeeded by Gareth Davies
Preceded by David Melding	Dirprwy Lywydd of the Senedd; 2016–present	Succeeded by David Rees
