= Alun Cairns =

British Conservative politician

The Right Honourable Alun Cairns
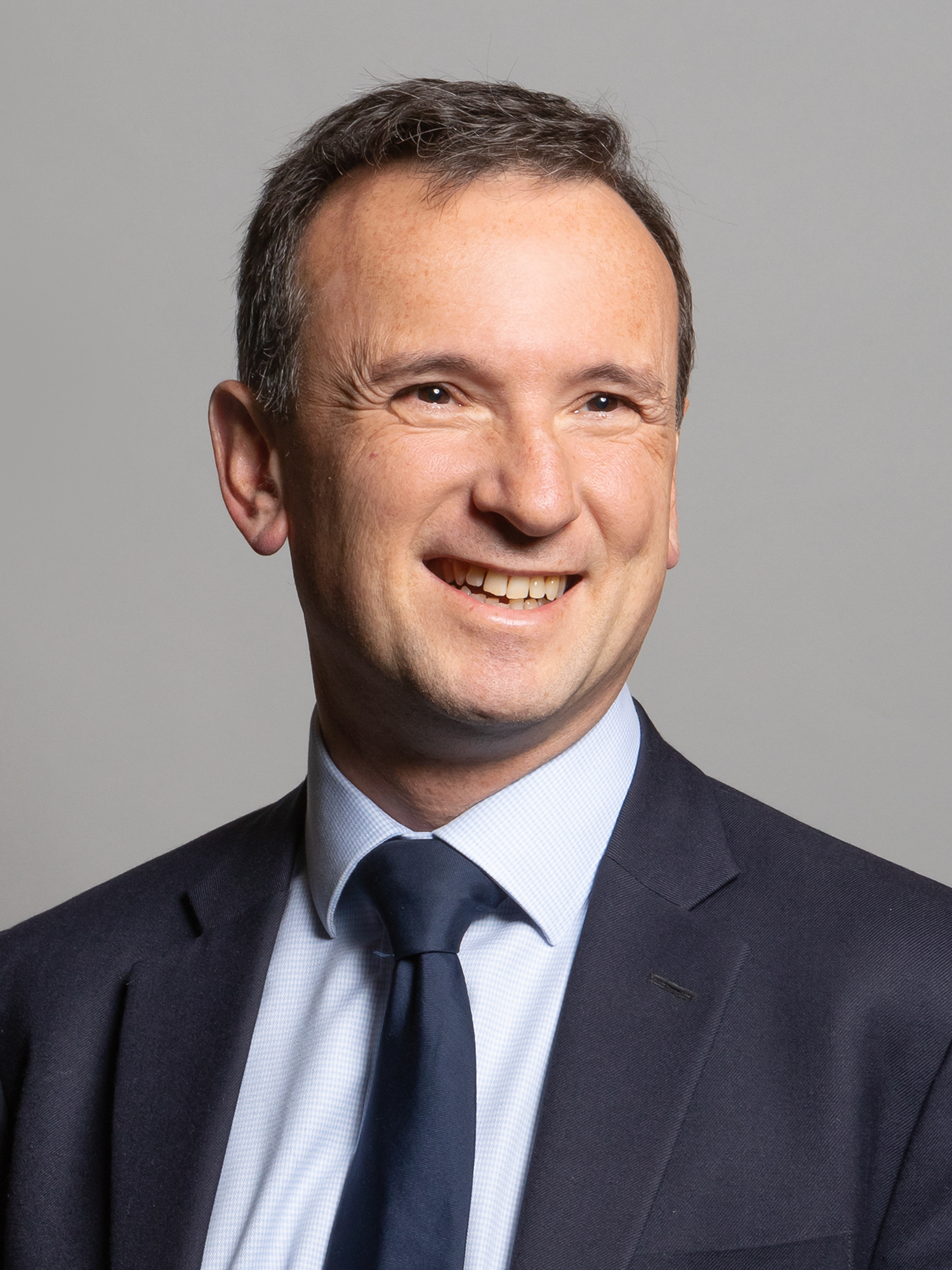
- Official portrait, 2020

Secretary of State for Wales
- In office 19 March 2016 – 6 November 2019
- Prime Minister: David Cameron; Theresa May; Boris Johnson
- Preceded by: Stephen Crabb
- Succeeded by: Simon Hart

Parliamentary Under-Secretary of State for Wales Lord Commissioner of the Treasury
- In office 15 July 2014 – 19 March 2016
- Prime Minister: David Cameron
- Preceded by: Stephen Crabb
- Succeeded by: Guto Bebb

Member of Parliament for Vale of Glamorgan
- In office 6 May 2010 – 30 May 2024
- Preceded by: John Smith
- Succeeded by: Kanishka Narayan

Member of the Welsh Assembly for South Wales West
- In office 6 May 1999 – 6 May 2011
- Preceded by: Assembly established
- Succeeded by: Suzy Davies

Personal details
- Born: 30 July 1970 (age 56) Swansea, Wales
- Party: Conservative
- Spouse: Emma Elizabeth Turner (m. 1996)
- Children: 1
- Education: University of Wales, Newport
- Website: Official website

Alun Hugh Cairns (born 30 July 1970) is a Welsh Conservative politician who served as the Member of Parliament (MP) for the Vale of Glamorgan from 2010 to 2024. He served as Secretary of State for Wales from 2016 to 2019.

He was previously a member of the National Assembly for Wales for the South Wales West region from 1999 to 2011. Elected to the British House of Commons at the 2010 general election, he resigned as Secretary of State for Wales in November 2019, after claims he had known about a former aide's role in the "sabotage" of a rape trial. Cairns said that he did not know the details of the case and in December 2019 he was cleared of breaking the ministerial code.

== Early life and career ==
Cairns was born on 30 July 1970 in Swansea, Wales to Hewitt and Margaret Cairns. He grew up in the village of Clydach. He attended the state-sector schools Ysgol Gynradd Gymraeg Pontardawe and Ysgol Gyfun Ddwyieithog Ystalyfera. His father was a welder at Port Talbot Steelworks, and his mother was a shopkeeper. He completed an MBA at University of Wales, Newport (now University of South Wales). Cairns worked as a petrol pump attendant before working for Lloyds Bank in 1989. He became a business development manager in 1992, and then field manager for the bank in 1998.

== Political career ==
Cairns stood as the Conservative Party candidate for Gower at the 1997 general election. He came second in the constituency, which had been represented by the Labour Party since 1910.

=== National Assembly for Wales ===
First elected as AM for South Wales West in 1999, he was re-elected in 2003 and 2007, before standing down at the 2011 Welsh Assembly election, having been elected to the UK parliament at the General Election the year prior. While in the assembly, he served in a number of frontbench and shadow cabinet roles for the Welsh Conservatives.

Shortly after being elected to the assembly, he was appointed as Economic Affairs and Europe spokesperson by leader Rod Richards. Nick Bourne retained him in this role after becoming leader of the Welsh Conservatives. Cairns was re-elected at the 2003 Welsh Assembly election and again retained in the economic development portfolio, also with responsibility for transport. He held this role until the 2007 Welsh Assembly election, when he was again re-elected.

After the 2007 election, he was appointed by Nick Bourne as Welsh Conservative Spokesperson for Education and Lifelong Learning. He became Shadow Minister for Education and Lifelong Learning on 11 July 2007, after the One Wales coalition was formed, leaving the Welsh Conservatives as the Official Opposition.

In September 2008, Cairns said that he asked for a National Assembly rule to be "clarified" to determine whether he could claim expenses for a second home in Cardiff. A rule change introduced in late 2006 by the Assembly's House Committee allowed him to claim expenses related to a flat in Cardiff even though his main home was reclassified as being situated in the Vale of Glamorgan.

While taking part in BBC Radio Cymru's weekly radio show, Dau o'r Bae, on 13 June 2008, Cairns was asked to apologise on air for referring to Italians as "greasy wops", and immediately did so. He subsequently resigned from his post in the Shadow Cabinet on the following day. He was re-appointed to the Shadow Cabinet as Shadow Minister for Local Government on 22 October 2008 after completion of a party investigation. In February 2009, he was reshuffled to be the Welsh Conservatives' Chief Whip and Business Manager, as well as Shadow Minister for Heritage. He stood down from these roles and the Assembly at the 2011 Welsh Assembly election.

As a member of the assembly's economic development and audit committees, he criticised the Welsh Government over a range of issues from transport infrastructure, European regional aid, public spending, and the Welsh economy. Cairns has also been a vocal opponent of the Scarweather Sands offshore wind farm development near Porthcawl.

=== House of Commons ===
Whilst serving as an Assembly Member, Cairns, along with then fellow Conservative AM Rod Richards, contested the Conservative selection of Clwyd West ahead of the May 2001 general election, both were unsuccessful.

Cairns was the Conservative Party's candidate for Vale of Glamorgan at the 2005 general election, and was re-selected as the Parliamentary candidate for the seat in July 2007. Cairns was suspended as the Parliamentary candidate while the party carried out an investigation over his radio comments; he was reinstated as the Parliamentary candidate on 22 October 2008.

Cairns was elected as the MP for Vale of Glamorgan at the 2010 general election, gaining the seat from Labour with a majority of 4,307.

Cairns is a member of the Curry Club group of Conservatives, a dining society set up in 2010 composed of Conservative MPs that were seen as independently minded, though not hostile to the prime minister David Cameron.

In 2011, Cairns became co-chairman of the newly formed All-Party Parliamentary Group on the Arch Cru Investment Scheme, intended to investigate the facts surrounding Arch Cru investment funds scandal and achieve justice for the victims.

He was re-elected in 2015 with an increased majority of 6,880.

On 15 August 2022, Cairns changed his support from Rishi Sunak to Liz Truss in the July–September 2022 Conservative Party leadership election.

==== Secretary of State for Wales ====
On becoming Secretary of State for Wales on 19 March 2016, Cairns replaced Stephen Crabb, who became Secretary of State for Work and Pensions, and was appointed to the Privy Council on 22 March.

Cairns supported a Remain vote in the 2016 EU membership referendum. He was once more re-elected to his Vale of Glamorgan seat in the 2017 general election, and increased his vote share for the third consecutive occasion.

After re-election, in July 2017, Cairns announced that tolls on the Severn bridges from England into Wales would be abolished by the end of the following year, a move which he said could boost the south Wales economy by about £100m a year.

In February 2018, during a meeting of the Welsh Grand Committee, Cairns became one of the first MPs ever to speak the Welsh language in a Westminster parliamentary debate. He commented: "I am proud to be using the language I grew up speaking, which is not only important to me, my family and the communities Welsh MPs represent, but is also an integral part of Welsh history and culture."

Cairns was criticised by some Labour and Plaid Cymru politicians in April 2018 when he announced the Second Severn Crossing between Wales and England was to be renamed as 'Prince of Wales Bridge' to mark the 60th anniversary of Prince Charles becoming the Prince of Wales. Cairns defended the decision by responding that a "silent majority" supported the name change, but a poll conducted by YouGov shortly after revealed 34% of respondents to be against the name change and only 17% in favour, while 47% had no strong feelings either way.

Cairns has said he supports the proposed Swansea Bay Tidal Lagoon renewable energy power plant, although he has expressed reservations in regard to the financial viability of the project, stating in 2017 that "none of us would want it to happen if it's not good value for money for the taxpayer." Cairns came under criticism in 2018 when reports emerged that the Government was considering abandoning the project, Plaid Cymru politician Jonathan Edwards referring to Cairns as the "grim reaper of Welsh politics – the bearer of bad news" after Cairns highlighted concerns over the cost of the tidal lagoon relative to nuclear power stations.

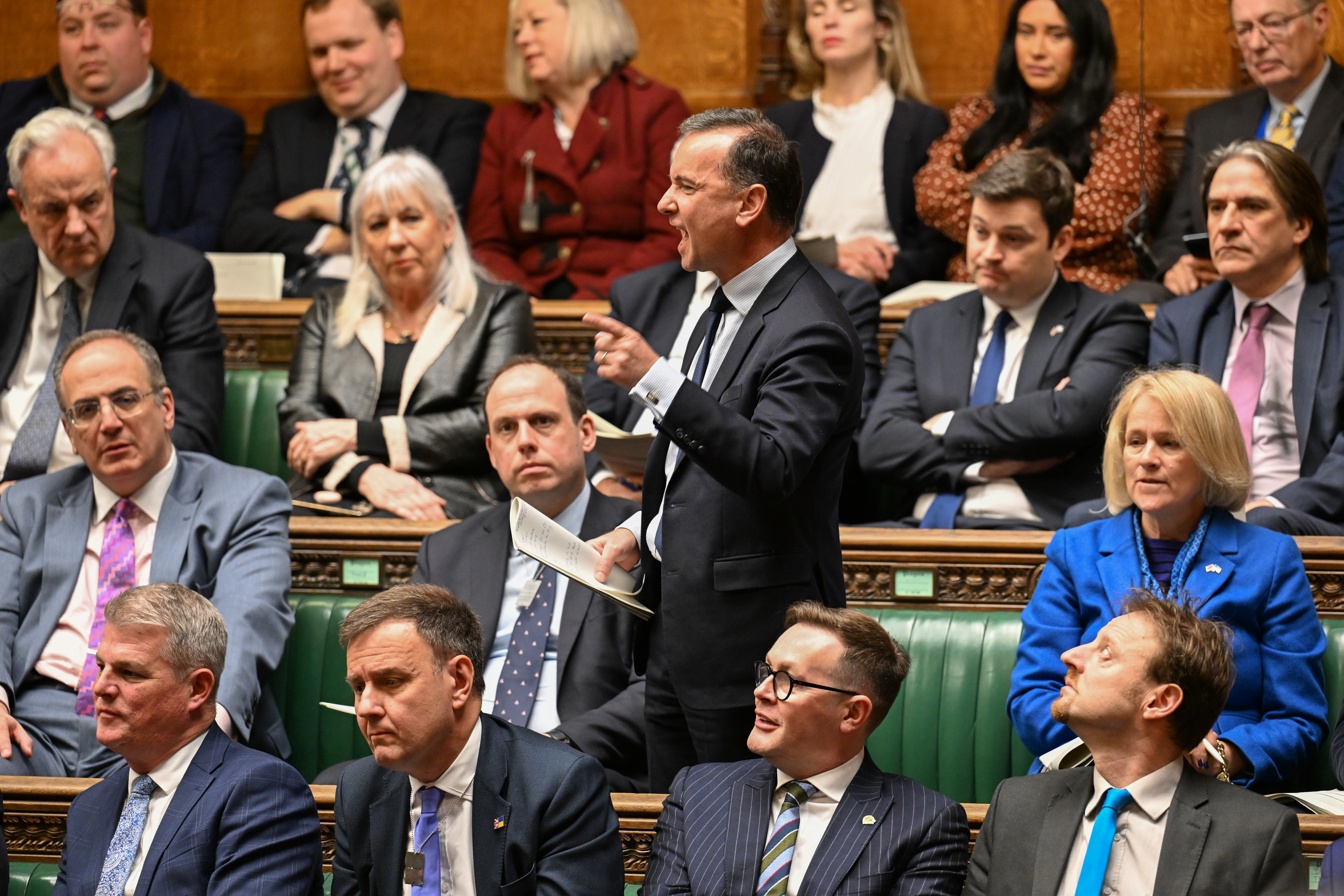
Cairns speaking during Prime Minister's Questions, 7 February 2024

In June 2018, the UK Government announced that the plans for the Swansea Bay Tidal Lagoon would be scrapped. This led to Plaid Cymru tabling a motion of no confidence in Cairns at the National Assembly for Wales, a vote that, if passed, would not have forced Cairns to resign as Welsh Secretary but rather would serve as symbolic disapproval. The motion was defeated, with 9 in favour to 40 against, on 27 June.

In Parliament, Cairns has previously served on the Public Administration Committee and Welsh Affairs Committee.

In July 2019, he apologised for voting against same-sex marriage in 2013, stating: "I regret the decision to vote against it and see the positive difference it has made to the lives of many".

He resigned from the Government on 6 November 2019, after evidence emerged that he had known about his former aide Ross England's role in the "sabotaging" of a rape trial, whom he later endorsed as a candidate for the Senedd. A Cabinet Office inquiry found that there was no evidence of his having breached the ministerial code; However, whilst concluding the enquiry, Sir Alex Allan wrote: "I find it unlikely that Mr Cairns would not have been told something about Mr England's role when he was told about the collapse. But all those involved state that they had not informed Mr Cairns of Mr England's role, and there is no direct evidence to contradict this. On that basis, I do not find that the evidence upholds the allegations of a breach of the ministerial code." The rape victim, who had worked for Cairns alongside England, later claimed that the inquiry was "a sham".

In July 2024, Carins contested the Vale of Glamorgan seat as the Conservative candidate for the 2024 General Election, but he was defeated by the Labour Party candidate Kanishka Narayan.

== Post-parliamentary career ==
Since his defeat at the 2024 general election, Cairns has worked as a freelance consultant, advising on Business and Policy.

== Views ==
Cairns believes the best route out of poverty is through employment. At a live BBC event in 2017, he said, "Getting a job is absolutely the best way out of poverty", but that increasing the personal allowance for tax and raising the National Living Wage were also important.

In 2014, Cairns spoke in favour of fox hunting, stating it is a part of "countryside conservation".

Cairns said in 2018 that society was only on "step one" of gender equality, and further progress had to be made. He believes all of society stands to gain from gender equality because the UK economy depends on "harnessing the talent of women, capitalising on the wealth of skill they bring to our workplaces".

=== BBC ===
As a member of the Downing Street Policy Board in 2013, Cairns said that it was the duty of the BBC to educate children about online dangers such as grooming and adult content, and implied it could be done through television shows such as EastEnders, which he said had educated the public in the past on issues like HIV. Cairns said "the BBC's mission statement and stated public purposes fit perfectly for it to become the trusted source of advice on how to protect children online." In relation to the television licence fee, Cairns described it as "probably the UK's most regressive tax", and stressed this meant transparency was vital. Despite this, Cairns considers himself a "critical friend" of the BBC.

=== European Union ===
Cairns supported remaining in the European Union in the 2016 UK European Union membership referendum. In the campaign period leading up to the referendum, in a government pamphlet sent to all homes across Wales, he stated: "One thing I think we can all agree on is that Europe needs reform. The Prime Minister has fought hard to get a deal which gives the UK the protections it needs." He further stated that the UK had achieved "a special status" within Europe and that the deal negotiated would allow Britain to avoid "the Euro, open borders or the prospect of ever-closer union."

After the UK voted to leave the European Union, Cairns came out in support of Brexit. In June 2017, he rejected the idea of the UK remaining in the EU single market in a 'soft' Brexit. In March 2018, he said he was "delighted" economic predictions about Brexit had been "proven wrong", adding: "I think people should be excited about the new opportunities as we leave the European Union." In November 2018, he endorsed Prime Minister Theresa May's negotiated agreement with the European Union on the United Kingdom's exit terms, though he said, "I don't like every element of this document because we've compromised".

=== Welsh government ===
Cairns is a proponent of government decentralisation for Wales. He has noted specifically the example of English devolution and how it has created a "new dynamic" in England, one which he would like Wales "to be able to respond to" by "empowering the regions, north Wales, west Wales" as part of its own "new dynamic." Cairns envisions Wales as part of a potential "Western powerhouse", similar to the idea of the Northern Powerhouse in England, and in early 2018 set up the Severn Growth Summit to explore opportunities for boosting Welsh economic growth.

== Personal life ==
Cairns lives in London and his Vale of Glamorgan constituency with his wife Emma and son.

He is an avid marathon runner, and as of 2018 has completed seven runs of the London Marathon. His London Marathon personal best time of 3:28:02 makes him the seventh fastest running MP of all time.

Senedd
New creation Creation of National Assembly	Member of the Welsh Assembly for South Wales West; 1999–2011	Succeeded by Suzy Davies
Parliament of the United Kingdom
Preceded by John Smith	Member of Parliament for Vale of Glamorgan; 2010–present	Incumbent
Political offices
Preceded by Stephen Crabb	Parliamentary Under-Secretary of State for Wales; 2014–2016	Succeeded by Guto Bebb
Preceded by Stephen Crabb	Lord Commissioner of the Treasury; 2014–2016	Succeeded by Guto Bebb
Preceded by Stephen Crabb	Secretary of State for Wales; 2016–2019	Succeeded by Simon Hart
