= Glyn Davies (politician) =

Welsh Conservative politician

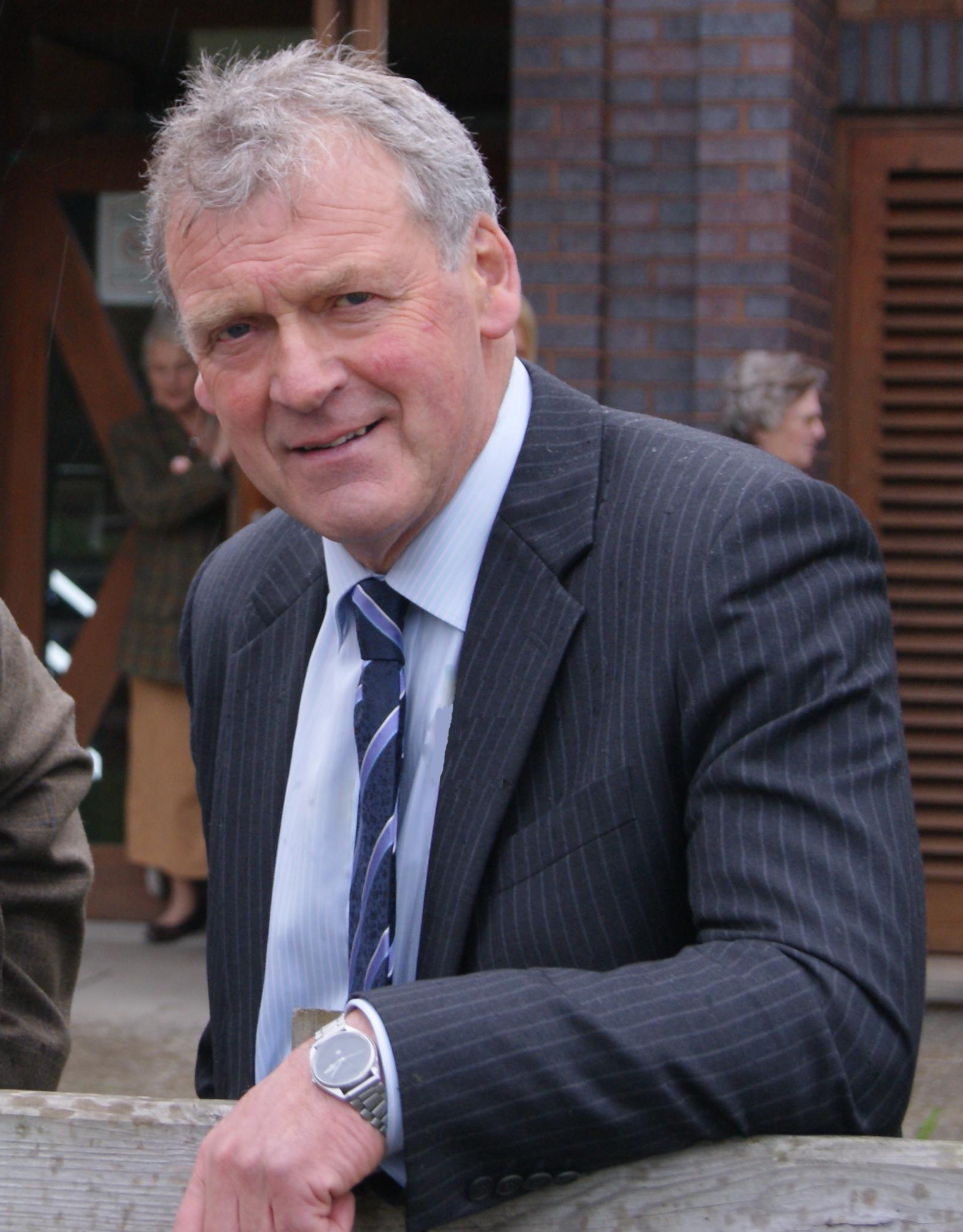

Member of Parliament for Montgomeryshire
- In office 6 May 2010 – 6 November 2019
- Preceded by: Lembit Öpik
- Succeeded by: Craig Williams

Member of the Welsh Assembly for Mid and West Wales
- In office 6 May 1999 – 3 May 2007
- Preceded by: Constituency created
- Succeeded by: Alun Davies

Personal details
- Born: 16 February 1944 (age 82) Welshpool, Montgomeryshire, Wales
- Party: Conservative
- Education: Aberystwyth University
- Website: Official website

Edward Glyn Davies (born 16 February 1944) is a former Welsh Conservative politician who was the Member of Parliament (MP) for Montgomeryshire from 2010 to 2019. Davies previously served as a Member of the Welsh Assembly (AM) for the Mid and West Wales region from 1999 to 2007.

He is a former chairman of the Development Board for Rural Wales and also served as a Member of the Welsh Development Agency and the Welsh Tourist Board.

He was Chairman of Montgomeryshire District Council and twice served as the Parliamentary Private Secretary (PPS) to the Secretary of State for Wales.

== Background ==
He was educated at Castle Caereinion Primary School and Llanfair Caereinion High School. At the age of 50, he attended Aberystwyth University, where he gained a diploma in international law and politics.

He spent his early working life running the family farm near Castle Caereinion, Welshpool on which he was born and in which still has a business interest. He now lives at Cil Farm, Berriew in a house once owned by Arthur Humphreys-Owen who served as an MP for Davies' seat from 1894–1906.

In 2002, Davies underwent major surgery for rectal cancer. He went on to make a full recovery and in 2006 competed in a rugby game alongside Jonah Lomu to promote the message that it is possible to make a full recovery following a serious illness, and to raise money for charity.

== Professional career ==
Davies was a farmer. He is a former chairman of the Development Board for Rural Wales and also served as a Member of the Welsh Development Agency and the Welsh Tourist Board.

== Political career ==
Davies' career in politics began in 1980 when he was elected to his local District Council. He was Chairman of Montgomeryshire District Council from 1985–89, having previously served as Chair of the Planning Committee and Chair of the Finance Committee.

Member of the National Assembly for Wales for the Welsh Conservative Party in the Mid and West Wales region from 1999 to 2007. Chair of the Agriculture and Rural Development Committee in the First Assembly; and the Environment, Planning and Countryside Committee in the Second Assembly.

Following the loss of his place in the National Assembly for Wales due to Conservative success elsewhere in the region, Davies challenged Lembit Öpik, the Liberal Democrat MP for Montgomeryshire, at the 2010 UK General Election, having unsuccessfully challenged Öpik at the 1997 General Election in the same seat. He beat Öpik to become the Member of Parliament for Montgomeryshire. In September 2010 it was announced that Glyn was appointed Parliamentary Private Secretary (PPS) to Cheryl Gillan as Secretary of State for Wales, a role he lost in the 2012 Cabinet reshuffle.

In 2015, he was re-elected in that year's general election with 45% of the vote. One of the votes for him was a drawing of a penis in the box next to his name, which was ruled valid.

Davies was again re-elected in the 2017 general election, with a majority of 9,285.

In July 2017, it was confirmed that Davies would resume his previous role (2010–2012) as Parliamentary Private Secretary (PPS) to the Secretary of State for Wales Alun Cairns.

On 13 May 2019, Davies announced he would not be standing for re-election at the next general election.

== Comments about academics ==
In October 2016, Davies tweeted a series of remarks about 'academics', suggesting that they lacked the status of experts and were universally out of touch with the real world. The remarks caused a significant backlash from the public, the press, and peers from within the Conservative Party. Since the incident, Davies has ceased using Twitter as a form of communication, and has refused to offer a public apology for his remarks.

== Blogging ==
Davies blogs semi-regularly, on his web page 'A View from Rural Wales'. The British blogger Iain Dale is quoted as describing Davies as "By common consensus the best politician blogger in Wales and he's a real character". Davies kept up blogging after losing his seat in the National Assembly.

In 2008, Davies defended the sacked former blogger Christopher Glamorganshire, and is quoted as saying "The Christopher Glamorganshire blog was on my list of 'my favourites'. It seemed to me to be written in a sensible and rational manner. Clearly, if his contract of employment said he was not allowed to blog, he doesn't have much of a case. But if it is simply a question of supposedly contravening the code, I think sacking him is very harsh and heavy-handed. This all smacks of the heavy hand of the state."

His blog was voted the second most popular Welsh political blog in Iain Dale's Total Politics Guide to Blogging 2008–09, a position he has maintained from the previous year.

== Offices held ==
- Parliamentary Private Secretary to Cheryl Gillan MP, September 2010 – July 2012
- Parliamentary Private Secretary to Alun Cairns MP, July 2016 – December 2019

Senedd
New title	Assembly Member for Mid and West Wales; 1999–2007	Succeeded by Alun Davies
Parliament of the United Kingdom
Preceded by Lembit Öpik	Member of Parliament for Montgomeryshire; 2010–2019	Succeeded by Craig Williams
