= Andrew RT Davies =

Welsh politician (born 1968)

Andrew RT Davies CBE MS
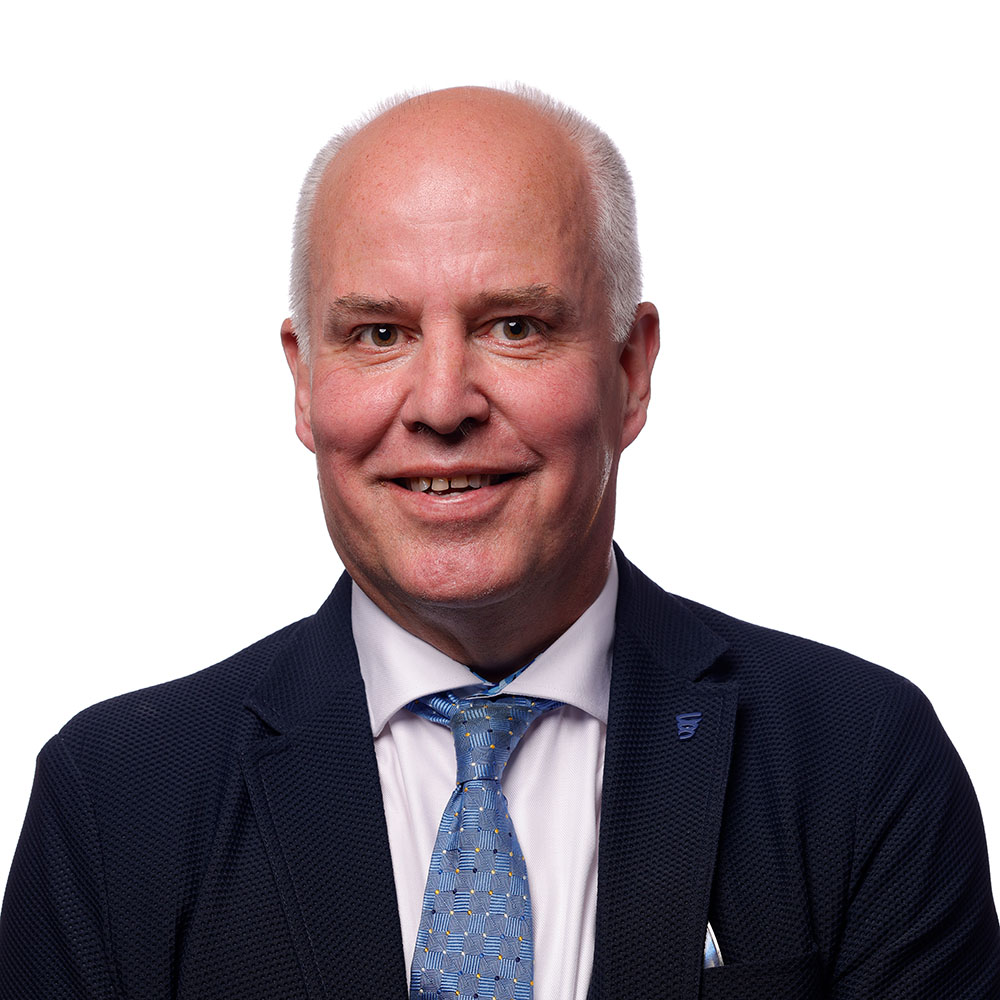
- Official portrait, 2026

Leader of the Welsh Conservative Party
- In office 24 January 2021 – 5 December 2024
- Leader: Boris Johnson; Liz Truss; Rishi Sunak; Kemi Badenoch
- Preceded by: Paul Davies
- Succeeded by: Darren Millar
- In office 14 July 2011 – 27 June 2018
- Deputy: Paul Davies
- Leader: David Cameron; Theresa May
- Preceded by: Nick Bourne (Note: Paul Davies served as interim leader between 6 May 2011 and 14 July 2011.)
- Succeeded by: Paul Davies

Leader of the Opposition
- In office 7 May 2021 – 5 December 2024
- Monarchs: Elizabeth II; Charles III
- First Minister: Mark Drakeford; Vaughan Gething; Eluned Morgan
- Preceded by: Himself (Note: Vacant: 29 March – 7 May 2021)
- Succeeded by: Darren Millar
- In office 24 January 2021 – 29 March 2021
- Monarch: Elizabeth II
- First Minister: Mark Drakeford
- Preceded by: Paul Davies
- Succeeded by: Himself
- In office 6 April 2017 – 27 June 2018
- Monarch: Elizabeth II
- First Minister: Carwyn Jones
- Preceded by: Leanne Wood (Note: Vacant: 14 October 2016 – 6 April 2017)
- Succeeded by: Paul Davies
- In office 14 July 2011 – 5 May 2016
- Monarch: Elizabeth II
- First Minister: Carwyn Jones
- Preceded by: Paul Davies
- Succeeded by: Leanne Wood
Shadow Cabinet portfolios
Shadow Minister for Health
In office 17 July 2020 – 24 January 2021
Leader	Paul Davies
Preceded by	Angela Burns
Succeeded by	Angela Burns
In office 27 February 2009 – 29 November 2010
Leader	Nick Bourne
Preceded by	Jonathan Morgan
Succeeded by	Nick Ramsay
Shadow Minister for Environment, Sustainability, and Rural Affairs (Note: Role began as Shadow Cabinet Secretary for Environment, Sustainability, and Rural Affairs)
In office 18 September 2018 – 17 July 2020
Leader	Paul Davies
Preceded by	David Melding Environment; Paul Davies Rural Affairs
Succeeded by	Janet Finch-Saunders
Shadow Minister for Education, Lifelong Learning and Skills
In office 16 June 2008 – 27 February 2009
Leader	Nick Bourne
Preceded by	Alun Cairns
Succeeded by	Paul Davies
Shadow Minister for Transport
In office 11 July 2007 – 16 June 2008
Leader	Nick Bourne
Preceded by	Office established
Succeeded by	David Melding

Member of the Senedd
- Incumbent
- Assumed office 3 May 2007
- Preceded by: Jonathan Morgan
- Constituency: South Wales Central (2007–2026); Pen-y-bont Bro Morgannwg (2026–present)

Member of the Vale of Glamorgan Council for Rhoose
- In office 15 February 2019 – 5 May 2022
- Preceded by: Matthew Lloyd

Personal details
- Born: Andrew Robert Tudor Davies; 28 November 1968 (age 57) Cowbridge, Wales
- Party: Conservative

Andrew Robert Tudor Davies CBE (born 28 November 1968) is a Welsh politician who has served as Member of the Senedd since 2007, first for South Wales Central region and then for Pen-y-bont Bro Morgannwg from 2026.

He has previously served as Leader of the Welsh Conservative Senedd Group from 2011 to 2018 and 2021 to 2024. Both times Davies resigned due to pressure from within his party to do so. As a consequence of being leader of the Welsh Conservatives, he has served a total of four terms as Leader of the Opposition, from his first from 2011 to 2016, his second from 2017 to 2018, his third from January–March 2021 and his fourth and final from May 2021–2024.

== Background ==
Andrew Robert Tudor Davies was educated at Llanfair Primary School, St John's Preparatory School, Porthcawl, and later boarded at Wycliffe College, Stroud. He is married to a qualified midwife and they have four children. He is a partner in the family farming business based in St Hilary near Cowbridge in the Vale of Glamorgan. Davies was a Welsh delegate on the Council of the National Farmers Union (NFU), vice-president of the local Young Farmers Club, and is a former chairman of Creative Communities, which seeks to develop structural community development. Davies is also a life governor of the Royal Welsh Agricultural Society, and was the Society's Oxford Farming Conference Scholar in 2002. He is a former governor at Llanfair Primary School.

== Career ==
=== Early political career ===
Joining the Conservative Party in 1997, Davies fought Cardiff West in the 2001 general election, and Brecon and Radnorshire in 2005. He served as Deputy Chairman (Political) for the Conservative Party in South Wales Central from 2002 to 2003, a region that comprises the Conservative Associations in Cardiff, Rhondda Cynon Taff and the Vale of Glamorgan. Between 2004 and 2005 he was Deputy Chairman of the Cardiff West Conservative Association.

==== Third Senedd (2007–2011) ====
In 2007, he was elected to the National Assembly of Wales on the South Wales Central regional list. He was appointed Shadow Minister for Transport by Nick Bourne. During his time as Shadow Transport Minister he supported protests from Welsh hauliers over the cost of fuel.

On 16 June 2008 he was reshuffled to the role of Shadow Minister for Education, Lifelong Learning and Skills. While in this role, he supported the removal of the flat-rate financial support grant at the time provided to Welsh people who studied at Welsh universities, and criticised that both spending and achievement were lagging behind English counterparts.

He also sat on the Assembly's Petitions Committee and the Subordinate Legislation Committee.

In February 2009 he became the Shadow Minister for Health in the National Assembly for Wales. He then resigned from the role in November 2010, shortly after a wider reshuffle. He claimed at the time of his resignation he was not seeking the leadership of the Welsh Conservative Group.

He won an award for being "Assembly Member to Watch" in December 2008.

=== First leadership of the Welsh Conservative Group ===
Davies was re-elected as AM for South Wales Central at the 2011 Welsh Assembly election. A leadership election was held after Nick Bourne lost his seat at that election. RT Davies contested this leadership election, and was elected as Leader of the Welsh Conservative Group on 14 July 2011, having won 53.1 per cent of the vote, defeating Nick Ramsay. He then became Leader of the Opposition in Wales, as the Welsh Conservatives were the second largest party, and appointed his Shadow Cabinet.

In February 2014, Davies removed four ministers; Nick Ramsay, Antoinette Sandbach, Mohammad Asghar and Janet Finch-Saunders, from his cabinet over a vote on tax-varying powers for the Welsh Assembly. The four ministers failed to support a motion condemning the choice of the lock-step model for devolution of taxation, which would not allow Wales to increase the rate of tax paid on any specific tax band – instead requiring any change to be made to all of them. They were removed from their roles despite this being the policy of the UK Conservative Party.

After the 2016 Welsh Assembly election, Davies was re-elected but ceased to be Leader of the Opposition, as the Welsh Conservatives became the third largest party. Davies became Leader of the Opposition again in April 2017, after Mark Reckless rejoined the Welsh Conservative Senedd group, making the Welsh Conservatives the second largest group in the Senedd again. RT Davies was criticised for allowing Reckless to rejoin the group, with Byron Davies, then Conservative MP for Gower describing it as "not a particularly bright idea," and Wales Secretary Alun Cairns clarifying that Reckless had not been allowed to become a member of the Conservative Party, and was only a member of the Conservative Senedd Group.

In June 2018, Wales Online led an investigation into what they described as Davies keeping his "public constituency office hidden from the public". The piece stated the office was located in a "wooden cabin 50 yards beyond a vehicle security barrier on a rural farm estate". In a freedom of information response by the Assembly Commission, the address of the office was confirmed as Penllyn Estate, Llwynhelig, Cowbridge CF71 7FF, a 1,200-acre mixed farm operation. The information only came to light after the FOI request by a Conservative Party member. A spokesperson for Davies responded to the investigation by stating the arrangements had been made "following a security incident at Andrew’s previous office on Cowbridge High Street where police attended to support a female employee", necessitating a more secure location. They continued stating that "Andrew regularly hosts constituents and organisations at his office and if he knew a Western Mail journalist had intended to visit he would’ve been there to welcome him with the kettle on".

==== Resignation ====
Davies responded to concerns raised by Airbus in June 2018 regarding the threat of a no-deal Brexit by stating that "there is a lot of hyperbole flying around" regarding a no deal Brexit. The comments were criticised by Conservative figures including Guto Bebb. Bebb went on to dispute Davies title as "Leader of the Welsh Conservatives", stating he only led the Assembly group. Secretary of State Alun Cairns described Airbus' comments as a "wake-up call" for "one of the jewels in the crown of UK manufacturing". A number of Davies' Welsh Conservative colleagues, including Secretary of State Alun Cairns, Mr Davies' Deputy, Paul Davies, and Monmouth AM Nick Ramsay, were all Remain supporters, in contrast to Davies role as a Vote Leave voice in the Welsh Conservatives.

In Spring 2018, a text was reportedly sent by Cairns which discussed with Welsh Conservative AMs how and when to remove Davies. Davies initially only stated that a figure in Westminster had sent the text, but refused to name the individual. This text was reportedly sent to Davies by accident, describing how "the other end of the M4" were in support of his replacement.

In around April 2018, it was rumoured that his Deputy Leader Paul Davies was planning a leadership challenge to Davies. Amid internal discussions in the party, Nick Ramsay reportedly made it clear to Mr Davies that they did not like each other prior to his resignation, and an AM reportedly "stormed out" of a dinner regarding the leadership of the party after Davies had spoken, who later was reported to be Ramsay.

Davies resigned as Leader of the Welsh Conservatives on 27 June 2018. A source close to Davies described the events at the time as "the revenge of Tory Remainers who can’t forgive him for going against Cameron and campaigning for a Leave vote in the Brexit referendum." Davies resignation was viewed by some in the media as sparked by Davies' "inflammatory remarks" towards Airbus. Sources close to Davies however spoke to the media and stated they felt he had been victim of "a plot to get rid of him for "seven or eight weeks" dating back to his controversial "decision to back a Leave vote in the 2016 Brexit referendum" which came against the wishes of then Prime Minister David Cameron, who had backed Remain.

=== Inter-leadership career ===
RT Davies was appointed as Shadow Cabinet Secretary for Environment, Sustainability, and Rural Affairs by Paul Davies in September 2018. In the role RT Davies led criticism of Natural Resources Wales in November 2018, particularly around their selling of timber on a closed rather than open market. He proposed splitting NRW into two separate bodies, and described the "bloated and largely incompetent quango" body as "no longer fit for purpose". Plaid agriculture spokesman Llyr Gruffydd however stated the issues faced by NRW were down to the 35% real terms cut in their budget and the organisation being under resourced.

In 2019, Davies was reported by Wales Online as having the highest budget for constituency office spending of any AM in the five Assembly political groups, with a spend of £102,655, including £35,182 for a salary for his wife Julia. Davies did not respond to requests for comments in the piece.

In a June 2019 op-ed on Nation.Cymru, Davies stated his top wishes from an incoming Conservative prime minister for Wales would be:

- A "shared prosperity fund" replacing the Joint Ministerial Committee.
- A "significant investment in Welsh infrastructure projects" to make up for previous rejections including the M4 Relief Road and tidal lagoon, through a "Green Deal".
- A "broadband revolution".
- The "devolution of air passenger duty" for Cardiff Airport.
- The restructuring of the Wales Office.
- Welsh representation on national and cross border bodies, to respond to the issues such as where the Countess of Chester hospital rejected Welsh patients.
- Welsh figures on regulators such as OFGEM, OFCOM, and Ofwat.

In July 2020, RT Davies was reshuffled from Shadow Environment Minister to Shadow Health Minister.

Following the storming of the United States Capitol by supporters of Donald Trump on 6 January 2021, Davies was criticised for comparing the riot to other British politicians' opposition to Brexit.

=== Second leadership of the Welsh Conservative Group ===
RT Davies was appointed as Leader of the Welsh Conservatives Group on 24 January 2021, following the resignation of Paul Davies, after a scandal involving possible breaches of Welsh COVID-19 regulations. He quickly appointed a Shadow Cabinet on the same day. This ceased to be the Shadow Cabinet on 29 March 2021, after Nick Ramsay left the Welsh Conservatives to contest the 2021 Senedd election as an independent. In the 2021 Senedd election, the Welsh Conservatives received 16 seats. Davies stated his intention to remain as leader of the Welsh Conservatives after this result.

In a July 2021 op-ed for Mail+, Davies accused the Welsh media of being "in hock to the nationalist agenda". He wrote: "This is what's in store for us in the Senedd over the next five years: listening to Labour ministers regurgitate historically ignorant, politically extreme ideas and a demonstrably poor understanding of sovereignty in Britain as they call for a federalist system that will only serve to worsen, not solve, the issues present in Wales."

Davies took a leave of absence from September to December 2021, citing the impact that bouts of COVID-19 and the flu had had on his mental wellbeing.

During his leadership, he opposed the changing of the default urban speed limit from 30 mph to 20 mph, being censured by the Senedd standards committee for bringing the Senedd into disrepute by inaccurately describing the policy as blanket. He also opposed the continued tenure of Vaughan Gething as First Minister, and called for further investigation and publication of evidence with regard to the firing of Hannah Blythyn. His leadership was increasingly described as populist.

==== 2024 leadership crisis ====
On 24 July 2024, Davies wrote an article for the website of GB News entitled "Children SHOULD NOT be forced to eat Halal school lunches", referring to a story from a member of the public who had allegedly been told that there was no non-halal meat options at their child's school. He had further written to Vale of Glamorgan Council, who were responsible for the school. The school later confirmed that Davies assertion that only halal meat options were available was false, and that non-halal meat options were available, and Vale of Glamorgan Council Leader Lis Burnett stated that Davies had publicly published the letter 5 minutes after sending it to the council, providing no time for a response. However, his false allegations were promoted by far-right activist Tommy Robinson and gained large social media attention during early stages of the 2024 United Kingdom riots.

Davies' initial article and letter were described as "ham-fisted attempts at dog-whistle racism" and "Islamophobic race-baiting" by the Muslim Council of Wales. He also faced further criticism from within his own party, with Muslim MS Natasha Asghar saying she had "raised concerns" directly with Davies about his statements and Shadow Finance Minister Peter Fox and former leader of the Welsh Conservatives Nick Bourne both making statements about Islamophobia in the party. Davies responded by saying "These were legitimate questions and as an elected member, I fulfilled my responsibilities by asking them. Attempts to equate those legitimate concerns with the disorder we’ve seen on our streets is particularly irresponsible. Just as the thuggery we’ve seen cannot be justified by legitimate concerns on political issues, those same concerns must not be ignored by political leaders."

Davies faced further public criticism from within his party after he polled attendees of the Vale of Glamorgan show on whether the Senedd should be abolished, with several members of Shadow Cabinet publicly criticising the poll, with former party leaders Paul Davies and Nick Bourne both questioning why a policy that is not formally party policy was being polled.

In October 2024, Davies was censured by the Senedd Standards of Conduct Committee, after having been found to have breached the Senedd's Code of Conduct by describing Wales' reduction of the default speed limit in built up areas from 30 to 20 as a "blanket" policy. His colleague and Shadow Transport Minister Natasha Asghar had been reprimanded prior to this for the same matter. He was also found to have breached the Code of Conduct over a tweet in which posted an image from an article from Guido Fawkes, containing First Minister Vaughan Gething and of a pregnant woman with the text "Welsh Government press release celebrates ‘birthing people.’ Wales makes womb for ‘birthing people.'" The Senedd Standards Committee found his tweet to be "a blatant lie", but did not say that any further action in relation to the breach of the Code of Conduct was warranted.

In November 2024, he faced similar criticism for his allegation that the Wales Anti-racism action plan contained a call for "dog-free areas" in the Welsh Countryside, based on an article in the Daily Mail which made the same claim. The Welsh Government described this as "inaccurate and a complete misrepresentation" of the report. Climate Cymru Ethnic Minorities – who were responsible for the portion of the report the line was included described it as being “out of context, misrepresented and used as clickbait to drive engagement.” Climate Cymru Ethnic Minorities asked Davies to remove his tweet about the matter on this basis, and he refused, stating he "[made] no apologies for opposing labour's divisive “Anti-Racist Wales Action Plan”." Climate Cymru and Climate Cymru Ethnic Minorities reported harassment after Davies made the claim.

==== Late 2024 confidence vote and resignation ====
On 28 November 2024, it was reported by Nation.Cymru that Davies had been asked to step down by members of the Welsh Conservative group. Later that same day it was reported that he would face a confidence vote in the Welsh Conservative group meeting on Tuesday 3 December. He survived the confidence vote, reportedly with the support of 9 out of 16 members, including his own. The vote was not held as a secret ballot, instead as a show of hands, after a motion by Davies and seconded by Laura Anne Jones. Shortly after the vote, Davies resigned as leader of the Welsh Conservatives, stating he viewed his position as untenable, after a number of members of the Conservative Shadow Cabinet privately threatened to resign if he remained in post. He formally left the role on 5 December 2024, after his replacement Darren Millar was elected unanimously within the Welsh Conservative group.

=== Vale of Glamorgan Council ===
Davies was elected as a County Councillor for Rhoose in a by-election on 14 February 2019, and claimed a basic councillor allowance of £13,868 before expenses, alongside his salary as a Senedd Member. He did not contest the 2022 local elections.

== Political views ==
=== Brexit and its impact on Wales ===
During the Brexit referendum campaign, Davies suggested Wales would be better off financially outside the European Union, stating that if the UK voted to leave, it could mean "Wales could be as much as half a billion pounds a year better off".

In a July 2016 interview with WalesOnline, Davies insisted that, as a result of Brexit "Wales must not lose a penny of the money that has historically flowed into Wales". However, after the referendum, the Secretary of State for Wales Alun Cairns, confirmed that the UK Government would in fact reduce the amount allocated for Wales (which the European Union had earmarked at £1.9 billion for the period 2014 to 2020).

In the run-up to the UK's invocation of Article 50 of the Treaty on European Union, Davies claimed that the Welsh Government should be denied the right to be part of Brexit negotiations on devolved areas.

Despite his firm anti-EU stance, Davies' family firm TJ Davies and Sons had accepted a total of £96,808.89 in EU subsidies over the period 16 October 2013 to 15 October 2014 alone, including £70,930.63 allocated under the Single Area payment scheme, £24,099.86 in agro-environmental payments, and £1,728.40 from the first Afforestation of Agricultural Land scheme. Commenting on the revelation of these figures, Britain Stronger in Europe spokesman James McGrory said "taking money from Europe while saying we should leave is hypocrisy of the first order."

In September 2019, Davies criticised proposals by the Liberal Democrats, Labour, and other parties which would force Prime Minister Boris Johnson to seek an extension to Article 50 if it prevented a no deal exit from the European Union. He described the avoidance of Brexit on 31 October as a "betrayal of democracy". He criticised First Minister Mark Drakeford for recalling the Welsh Assembly to debate Brexit, stating that the decision would "achieve nothing", and joined Conservative ministers in voting against a motion criticising the UK Government's handling of a no deal exit.

=== Devolution ===
Davies has frequently been critical of further devolution to the Senedd. In 2022, he called on candidates in the July–September 2022 Conservative Party leadership election to pledge that they would not grant further powers to Senedd. In 2024, he polled attendees of the Vale of Glamorgan County show on whether the Senedd should be abolished, prompting criticism from members of his own party.

However, he has supported some policies that would increase Senedd powers, including supporting the ability of the Senedd to raise taxes on individual tax brackets independently, rather than in 'lock-step' as proposed by the Conservative-Liberal Democrat coalition government in 2014.

== Honours ==
Davies was made a Commander of the Order of British Empire (CBE) in the 2020 New Year Honours, "for political and public service".

== Footnotes ==
Senedd
Preceded by Jonathan Morgan	Member of the Senedd for South Wales Central; 2007–present	Incumbent
Political offices
New office	Shadow Minister for Transport; 2007–2008	Succeeded by David Melding
Preceded by Alun Cairns	Shadow Minister for Education, Lifelong Learning and Skills; 2008–2009	Succeeded by Paul Davies
Preceded by Jonathan Morgan	Shadow Minister for Health; 2009–2010	Succeeded by Nick Ramsay
Preceded by Nick Bourne	Leader of the Opposition in Wales; 2011–2016	Succeeded by Leanne Wood
Preceded by Leanne Wood	Leader of the Opposition in Wales; 2017–2018	Succeeded by Paul Davies
Preceded by Paul Davies	Leader of the Opposition in Wales; 2021–present	Incumbent
Party political offices
Preceded by Nick Bourne	Leader of the Welsh Conservatives; 2011–2018	Succeeded by Paul Davies; Acting
Preceded by Paul Davies	Leader of the Welsh Conservatives; 2021–2024	Succeeded by Darren Millar
