= David Melding =

British politician (born 1962)

David Melding CBE
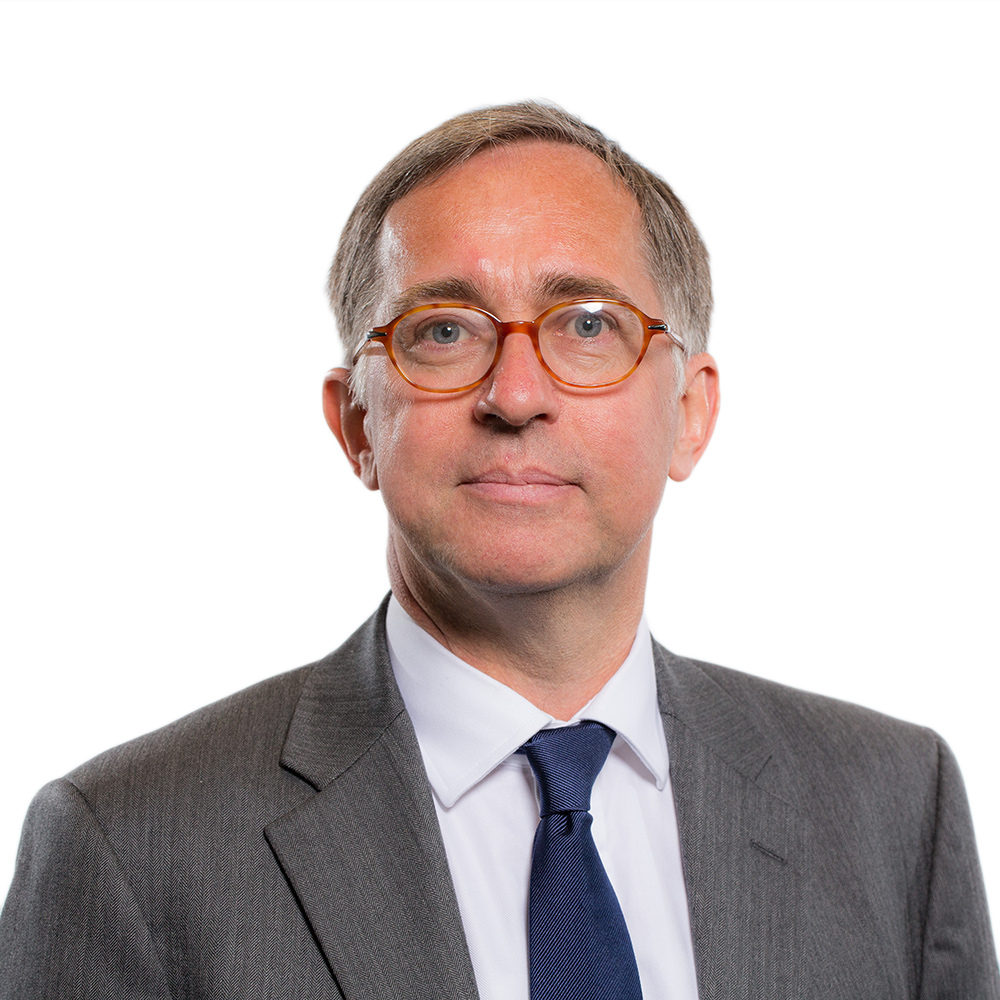
- David Melding, July 2016

Deputy Presiding Officer of the National Assembly for Wales
- In office 11 May 2011 – 11 May 2016
- Preceded by: Rosemary Butler
- Succeeded by: Ann Jones

Shadow Minister for Economic Development
- In office 11 July 2007 – 16 June 2008
- Leader: Andrew RT Davies
- Preceded by: Alun Ffred Jones
- Succeeded by: Russell George (new position)

Shadow Cabinet Secretary for Housing, Heritage, Culture, and Media
- In office 18 September 2018 – 17 July 2020
- Leader: Paul Davies
- Preceded by: New position

Shadow Counsel General & Shadow Minister for Culture & Communications
- In office 17 July 2020 – 9 September 2020
- Leader: Paul Davies
- Preceded by: New position

Member of the Senedd for South Wales Central
- In office 6 May 1999 – 29 April 2021
- Preceded by: Office Created
- Succeeded by: Joel James

Personal details
- Born: 28 August 1962 (age 64) Neath, Wales
- Party: Conservative
- Education: Cardiff University
- Occupation: Politician
- Cabinet: Shadow Cabinet (Wales)
- Website: davidmelding.wales

David Robert Michael Melding CBE (born 28 August 1962) is a former Welsh Conservative Party politician, who served as a Member of the Senedd (MS) for South Wales Central between 1999 and 2021. He was the Deputy Presiding Officer of the Senedd between 2011 and 2016 and is the only Conservative member to hold the role.

== Early life ==
Melding was born in Neath, where he attended Dwr-y-Felin Comprehensive School.

He studied Politics at the University of Wales, Cardiff, obtaining a BSc (Econ), followed by an MA in Government at the College of William and Mary, Virginia in the United States.

== Early career ==
Melding began his career as part of the Conservative Research Department from 1986 until 1989. In 1989, he became Deputy Director of the Welsh Centre for International Affairs until 1996. From 1996 to 1999, he was a coordinator at the Carers National Association in Wales.

== Political career ==
Melding was elected to the Senedd in the South Wales Central Region in 1999, a position he held until 2021. He served as the Welsh Conservatives' Director of Policy, writing manifestos for the 2003, 2007, and 2011 assembly elections.

He served as Deputy Presiding Officer of the Senedd between 2011 and 2016. In 2016, he was mentioned as a likely name to seek the role of Presiding Officer to succeed the outgoing Rosemary Butler, but in May he confirmed we would not be standing.

Melding takes an interest in Welsh constitutional matters, and in 2017 proposed the establishment of a "second chamber of the assembly... for residents to influence decisions and laws". Such a chamber would be formed on the basis of citizens service.

That same year, he was awarded a CBE for his "services to political and public life" in the New Years Honours List.

In July 2018, he supported Paul Davies in his campaign to become the Welsh Conservatives' new leader.

In August 2019, Melding wrote in the Daily Express stating that the Conservative Party was under "severe threat" and "about to split".

In September 2019, Melding spoke out against his party's position on a no-deal Brexit, stating that he "wanted no part in a no-deal Brexit strategy that would hurt the most vulnerable."

He quit his role in the shadow front bench in September 2020 after disagreements with the party over changes to the Brexit agreements and the UK Internal Market Bill that was brought forward in the UK Parliament on the same day. He made his decision to leave the front bench permanently after "misgivings for some time" over the party's approach to Brexit, citing that it will lead to the union breaking up.

== Senedd positions ==
While serving in the Senedd, Melding was appointed to a number of Committee and Shadow Cabinet roles:

- Chair of the Standards of Conduct Committee in the First Assembly (1999-03)
- Chair of the Legislation Committee in the Second Assembly (2003–07)
- Chair of Audit Committee in the Third Assembly (2007–2011)
- Shadow Minister for Economic Development (2007–2015)
- Shadow Cabinet Secretary for Housing, Heritage, Culture, and Media (2016–2020)
- Shadow Counsel General & Shadow Minister for Culture & Communications (July 2020 – September 2020)

== Personal life ==
In his spare time, Melding is Governor of Meadowbank Special School in Cardiff and Headlands Special School in Penarth.

In February 2018, he spoke to the BBC about his experiences of "horribly debilitating" panic attacks, during a debate on mental health in the Senedd.

== Offices held ==
Senedd
Preceded by (new post)	Member of the Senedd for South Wales Central; 1999–2021	Succeeded by Joel James
Preceded by Rosemary Butler	Deputy Presiding Officer; 2011–2016	Succeeded by Ann Jones
Political offices
Preceded by Alun Ffred Jones	Shadow Minister for Economic Development; 2007–2008; 11 July 2007 to 16 June 2008	Succeeded by Role merged
Preceded by (new post)	Shadow Minister for Economic Development and Transport; 2007–2008; 16 June 2008 to 22 October 2008	Succeeded by Role merged
Preceded by David Melding	Shadow Minister for Economic Development; 2007–2008; Since 11 July 2007 to 16 June 2008	Succeeded by Russell George
Preceded by (new post)	Shadow Cabinet Secretary for Housing, Heritage, Culture, and Media; 2016–2020	Succeeded by Role merged
