= Welsh Conservatives =

Welsh branch of the UK Conservative Party

Welsh Conservatives Ceidwadwyr Cymreig
- Leader of the Welsh Conservatives in the Senedd: Darren Millar
- Shadow Secretary of State for Wales: Mims Davies
- Chairman: Byron Davies
- President: Glyn Davies
- Founded: 1921; 105 years ago
- Headquarters: Rhymney House, Parc Ty Glas, Llanishen, Cardiff CF14 5DU
- Ideology: Conservatism (British); Economic liberalism; British unionism
- Political position: Centre-right to right-wing
- National affiliation: Conservatives
- Colours: Blue
- House of Commons: 0 / 32 (Welsh seats)
- Senedd: 7 / 96
- Councillors in Wales: 101 / 1,234
- Councils led in Wales: 0 / 22
- Police and crime commissioners: 0 / 4

Website
- www.conservatives.wales

The Welsh Conservative Party (Welsh: Plaid Ceidwadwyr Cymreig), commonly the Welsh Conservatives (Welsh: Ceidwadwyr Cymreig), is the branch of the United Kingdom Conservative Party that operates in Wales. They currently hold 7 of the 96 seats in the Senedd and none of the 32 Welsh seats in the House of Commons. In Senedd elections, the Conservatives are the fourth-most supported party but have at times been second and third. At Westminster elections and as of 1999, it was the second-most popular political party in Wales by vote share, having obtained the second-largest share of the vote at every general election since 1931.

== History ==
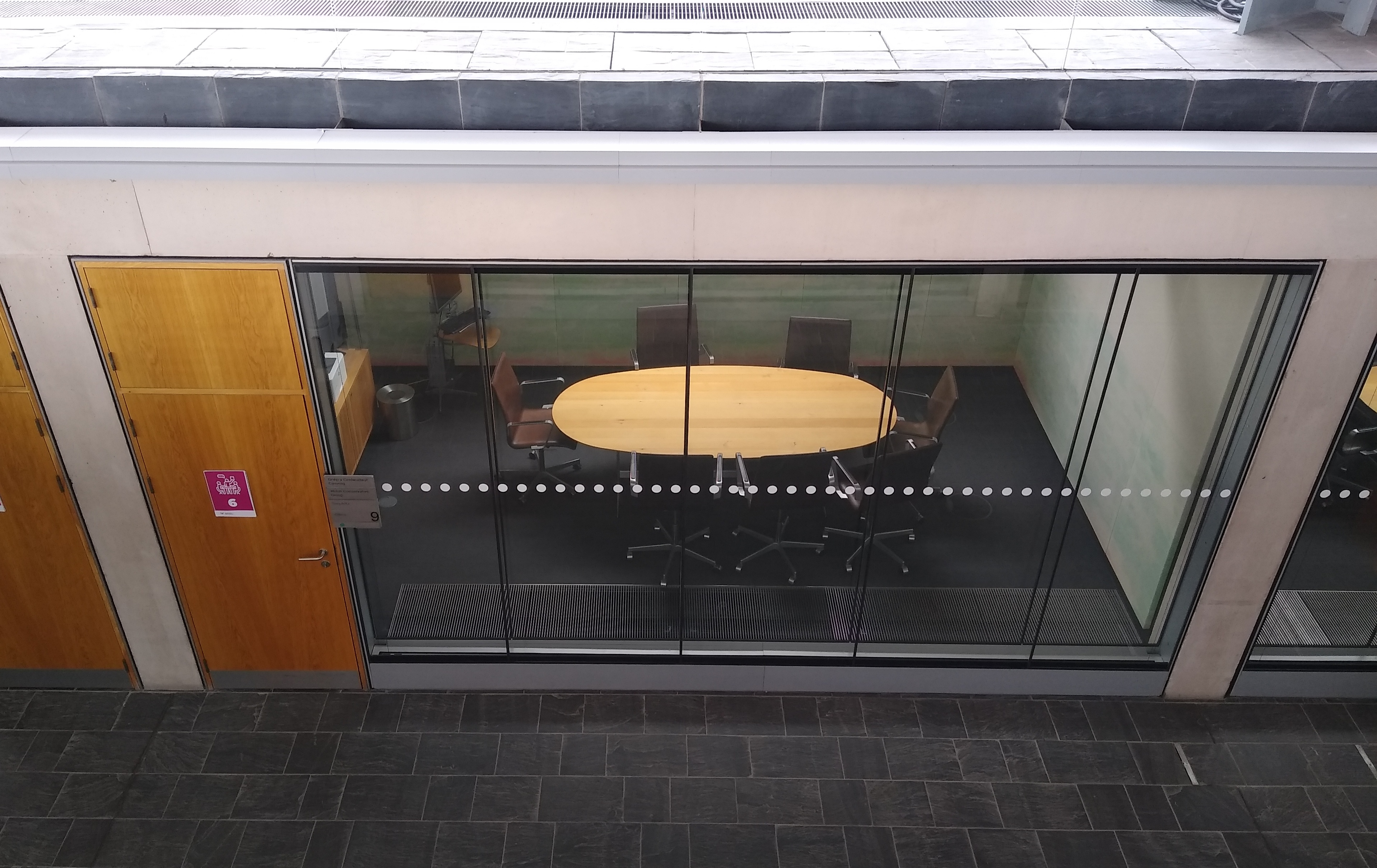
Welsh Conservative Group office in the Senedd building

For a significant period of its electoral history, the Conservative Party in Wales was not one unified institution, instead several associations of the wider UK wide Conservative Party. Since the establishment of the franchise and expanded democratic participation in Wales, the Conservative Party has been a generally unsuccessful electoral force in elections to the UK Parliament. A great deal of their success in the late 19th and early 20th centuries came from borough constituencies which were largely enclaves of English voters within Wales.

In 1921 the Welsh Conservatives were formalised as an organisation as the Wales and Monmouthshire Conservative and Unionist Council, by the merger of the three existing Welsh provincial associations of the party's National Union. For much of their history, they were dominated by the party in England, even to the extent of supplying the Welsh Secretaries of State. It was after the establishment of the Assembly in 1999, which their members largely opposed, that they became more of a Welsh-orientated party.

Their first leader, the former Welsh Office Minister Rod Richards, showed a combative style of politics against the Labour government. However Richards resigned shortly after the Assembly had become established in response to allegations of an assault, of which he was later cleared. Nick Bourne, a law professor and former leader of the No campaign in the Welsh Assembly referendum, then became the leader, in an unopposed election. From 1999 to 2007, the party remained firmly in opposition in Wales, opposed to forming an alliance with other political parties. This changed after the indecisive 2007 election, when the Welsh Conservatives were briefly involved in coalition talks on a "rainbow coalition" with the Welsh Liberal Democrats and Plaid Cymru, which collapsed after the Liberal Democrats backed out. Plaid Cymru ruled itself out of joining the Conservatives in a coalition on an ideological basis. Plaid Cymru and Labour eventually formed the government under the terms of their One Wales agreement. As a result of the agreement, the Conservatives, the largest opposition party, became the Official Opposition in the Welsh Assembly.

In the otherwise mainly successful Welsh Assembly elections of 2011, the long serving Welsh Conservative leader, Nicholas Bourne (2000–2011) lost his regional list seat in Mid and West Wales. This was because the party secured a significant number of constituency seats, meaning they were not assigned any regional list seats. He had been the longest serving of the party political leaders in the Welsh Assembly.

The Preseli Pembrokeshire Assembly Member Paul Davies then became the Interim Leader whilst an election took place. The contest was between Andrew RT Davies (South Wales Central) and Nick Ramsay (Monmouthshire). Andrew RT Davies won with some 53.1 per cent of the vote on a 49 per cent turnout of the party's Welsh membership. Also in the post-May 2011 Welsh Assembly elections period, David Melding (South Wales Central) was elected as the Deputy Presiding Officer of the Welsh Assembly, the first time a Conservative had held this post.

At the 2021 Senedd election, the Welsh Conservatives won eight constituency seats, taking Vale of Clwyd from Welsh Labour and Brecon and Radnorshire from the Welsh Liberal Democrats and 26.1 per cent of the constituency vote across Wales, their best constituency seats results since creation of the Senedd in 1999.

In the 2022 Welsh local elections, the Conservatives lost half their councillors across Wales and lost control of Monmouthshire County Council.

The Conservatives won seven seats at the 2026 Senedd election with much of their vote share going to Reform UK. This was their worst result since devolution.

== Leadership ==
In the Senedd, the Welsh Conservative Group have their own leader who is often referred to as the Leader of the Welsh Conservatives, sometimes including by the leader themselves. The Leader of the Welsh Conservative Group in the Senedd has been described as the de facto leader of the Conservative Party in Wales, although the UK party leadership has rejected this claim and criticised the use of the title Leader of the Welsh Conservatives, stating that the UK party leader is the only leader in Wales while the group leader only leads it in the Senedd. This lack of recognition has led to calls from senior figures in the Welsh party, including former leader Andrew RT Davies and current chair Lord Davies of Gower to introduce an official devolved leadership position for the Welsh Conservatives with constitutional recognition from the Conservative Party, like with Welsh Labour and the Scottish Conservatives. This proposal has been criticised by senior figures in the UK party, including former secretary of state for Wales Cheryl Gillan, who described it as "irritating" and a "distraction".

The Leader of the Welsh Conservative Group in the Senedd is usually elected by the party membership. The position was first introduced in November 1998, when a leadership contest was held to elect a leader for the Conservatives in the National Assembly for Wales, now known as the Senedd, ahead of the first elections to the devolved legislature in 1999. The winner of that election was Rod Richards, who was elected as the first leader of the Welsh Conservative Group. He resigned in 1999 after being accused of assault, originally for a temporary period, and appointed his deputy David TC Davies as acting leader. This was overruled shortly after with Nick Bourne taking Davies's place as acting leader, leading Richards to resign in protest. After Richards's resignation, Bourne was officially elected as leader having stood for the position unopposed. He left the role after losing his assembly seat in the 2011 assembly election and Andrew RT Davies was elected to succeed him in that year. RT Davies resigned in 2018 after being informed that he did not have the confidence of all group members to continue serving in the role, with Paul Davies becoming acting leader until being officially elected as leader later that year. Paul Davies resigned after breaking COVID-19 restrictions in 2021 and Andrew RT Davies was re-elected as leader for a second time, being unopposed for the role. On 3 December 2024, Davies announced he would stand down from the role, after he narrowly won a confidence vote by 9 votes to 7. He said he believed his leadership to be untenable with a substantial minority in the group against him. Darren Millar succeeded Davies two days later, after facing no opposition in the 2024 Welsh Conservatives leadership election.

| No. | Image | Name | Term start | Term end |
|---|---|---|---|---|
| 1 | | Rod Richards | 10 November 1998 | 10 August 1999 |
Nick Bourne was interim leader during this period
| 2 | | Nick Bourne | 18 August 1999 | 6 May 2011 |
Paul Davies was interim leader during this period
| 3 | | Andrew RT Davies | 14 July 2011 | 27 June 2018 |
Paul Davies was interim leader during this period
| 4 | | Paul Davies | 6 September 2018 | 23 January 2021 |
| (3) | | Andrew RT Davies | 24 January 2021 | 5 December 2024 |
| 5 | | Darren Millar | 5 December 2024 | Incumbent |

== Election results ==
=== House of Commons ===
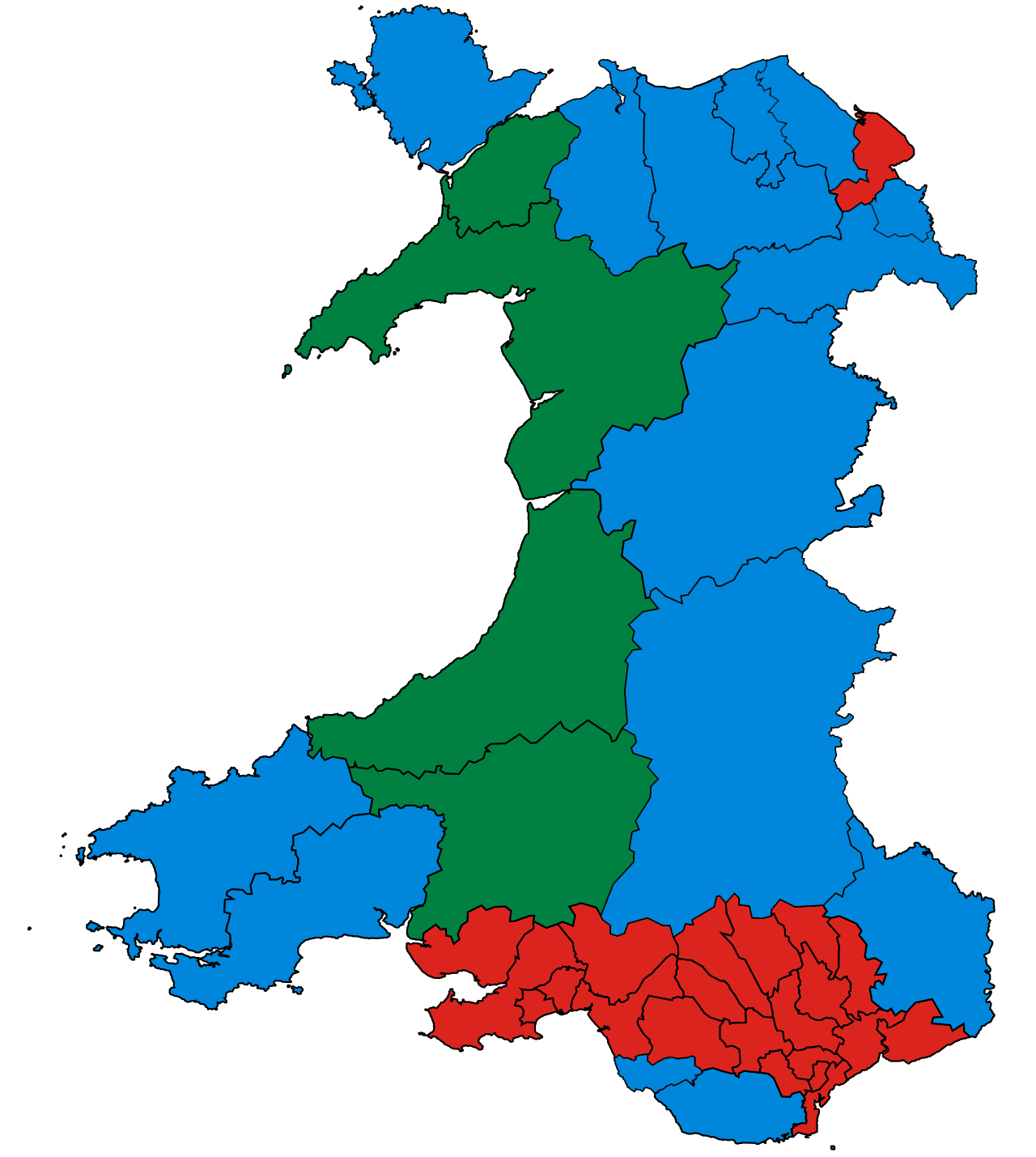
Performance of the Welsh Conservatives at the 2019 general election

| Election | Wales | | +/– |
| Election | % | Seats | +/– |
|---|---|---|---|
| 1922 | 21.4 | 6 / 36 | |
| 1923 | 21.0 | 4 / 36 | ▼2 |
| 1924 | 28.3 | 9 / 36 | ▲5 |
| 1929 | 21.9 | 1 / 36 | ▼8 |
| 1931 | 22.1 | 6 / 36 | ▲5 |
| 1935 | 23.3 | 6 / 36 | Steady |
| 1945 | 16.5 | 3 / 36 | ▼3 |
| 1950 | 21.0 | 3 / 36 | Steady |
| 1951 | 27.6 | 5 / 36 | ▲2 |
| 1955 | 26.7 | 5 / 36 | Steady |
| 1959 | 29.6 | 6 / 36 | ▲1 |
| 1964 | 27.6 | 6 / 36 | Steady |
| 1966 | 27.0 | 3 / 36 | ▼3 |
| 1970 | 27.7 | 7 / 36 | ▲4 |
| Feb 1974 | 25.9 | 8 / 36 | ▲1 |
| Oct 1974 | 23.9 | 8 / 36 | Steady |
| 1979 | 32.2 | 11 / 36 | ▲3 |
| 1983 | 31.0 | 14 / 38 | ▲3 |
| 1987 | 29.5 | 8 / 38 | ▼6 |
| 1992 | 28.6 | 6 / 38 | ▼2 |
| 1997 | 19.6 | 0 / 40 | ▼6 |
| 2001 | 21.0 | 0 / 40 | Steady |
| 2005 | 21.4 | 3 / 40 | ▲3 |
| 2010 | 26.1 | 8 / 40 | ▲5 |
| 2015 | 27.2 | 11 / 40 | ▲3 |
| 2017 | 33.6 | 8 / 40 | ▼3 |
| 2019 | 36.1 | 14 / 40 | ▲6 |
| 2024 | 18.2 | 0 / 32 | ▼14 |

=== Senedd ===
Performance of the Welsh Conservatives at the 2026 Senedd election

| Election | Constituency | | | Regional | | | Votes | % | Total seats | +/– | Government |
| Election | Votes | % | Seats | Votes | % | Seats | Votes | % | Total seats | +/– | Government |
|---|---|---|---|---|---|---|---|---|---|---|---|
| 1999 | 162,133 | 15.8 | 1 / 40 | 168,206 | 16.5 | 8 / 20 | | | 9 / 60 | | Opposition |
| 2003 | 169,832 | 19.9 | 1 / 40 | 162,725 | 19.2 | 10 / 20 | | | 11 / 60 | ▲2 | Opposition |
| 2007 | 218,730 | 22.4 | 5 / 40 | 209,153 | 21.4 | 7 / 20 | | | 12 / 60 | ▲1 | Opposition |
| 2011 | 237,388 | 25.0 | 6 / 40 | 213,773 | 22.5 | 8 / 20 | | | 14 / 60 | ▲2 | Opposition |
| 2016 | 215,597 | 21.1 | 6 / 40 | 190,846 | 18.8 | 5 / 20 | | | 11 / 60 | ▼3 | Opposition |
| 2021 | 289,802 | 26.1 | 8 / 40 | 278,560 | 25.1 | 8 / 20 | | | 16 / 60 | ▲5 | Opposition |
| 2026 (Note: Starting with the 2026 election, the Senedd was increased to 96 members who are all elected through closed list proportional representation (using the D'Hondt method) in sixteen six-member constituencies) | | | | | | | 134,926 | 10.7 | 7 / 96 | ▼9 | Opposition |

=== Local councils ===
Welsh Conservatives by ward and council control after the 2017 local elections

| Election | Votes | % | Councils | ± | Seats | ± |
|---|---|---|---|---|---|---|
| 1993 | 84,909 | 12.5 | 0 / 8 | | 32 / 502 | |
| 1995 | 75,448 | 8.1 | 0 / 22 | Steady | 42 / 1,272 | ▲10 |
| 1999 | 99,565 | 10.1 | 0 / 22 | Steady | 75 / 1,270 | ▲33 |
| 2004 | 99,991 | 11.0 | 1 / 22 | ▲1 | 107 / 1,263 | ▲32 |
| 2008 | 148,708 | 15.6 | 2 / 22 | ▲2 | 165 / 1,270 | ▲19 |
| 2012 (Note: The 2012 figures exclude Anglesey, where the election was deferred and held in 2013, although the change in seats and votes shown is a direct comparison between the 2008 and 2012 figures in the 21 councils up for election. The 2017 figures show changes from the 2012 and 2013 elections.) | 108,365 | 12.8 | 0 / 22 | ▼2 | 105 / 1,235 | ▼66 |
| 2017 | 182,520 | 18.8 | 1 / 22 | ▲1 | 184 / 1,271 | ▲79 |
| 2022 | 145,115 | 15.3 | 0 / 22 | ▼1 | 111 / 1,231 | ▼86 |

=== European Parliament ===
| Election | Wales | | +/– |
| Election | % | Seats | +/– |
|---|---|---|---|
| 1979 | 36.6 | 1 / 4 | |
| 1984 | 25.4 | 1 / 4 | Steady |
| 1989 | 23.5 | 0 / 4 | ▼1 |
| 1994 | 14.6 | 0 / 5 | Steady |
| 1999 | 22.8 | 1 / 5 | ▲1 |
| 2004 | 19.4 | 1 / 4 | Steady |
| 2009 | 21.2 | 1 / 4 | Steady |
| 2014 | 17.4 | 1 / 4 | Steady |
| 2019 | 6.5 | 0 / 4 | ▼1 |

== Appointments ==
=== House of Lords ===
| No. | Name | Date ennobled |
|---|---|---|
| 1. | Lord Bourne of Aberystwyth | 2013 |
| 2. | Lord Harlech | 2021 (Hereditary) |
| 3. | Lord Gilbert of Panteg | 2015 |
| 4. | Lord Davies of Gower | 2019 |
| 5. | Lord Griffiths of Fforestfach | 1991 |
| 6. | Lord Trefgarne of Cleddau | 1962 (Hereditary) |
| 7. | Lord Wolfson of Tredegar | 2021 |
| 8. | Baroness Finn of Swansea | 2015 |
| 9. | Baroness Swinburne | 2023 |
| 10. | Olivia Bloomfield, Baroness Bloomfield of Hinton Waldrist | 2016 |
