= Nick Bourne =

Welsh Conservative politician

The Right Honourable The Lord Bourne of Aberystwyth
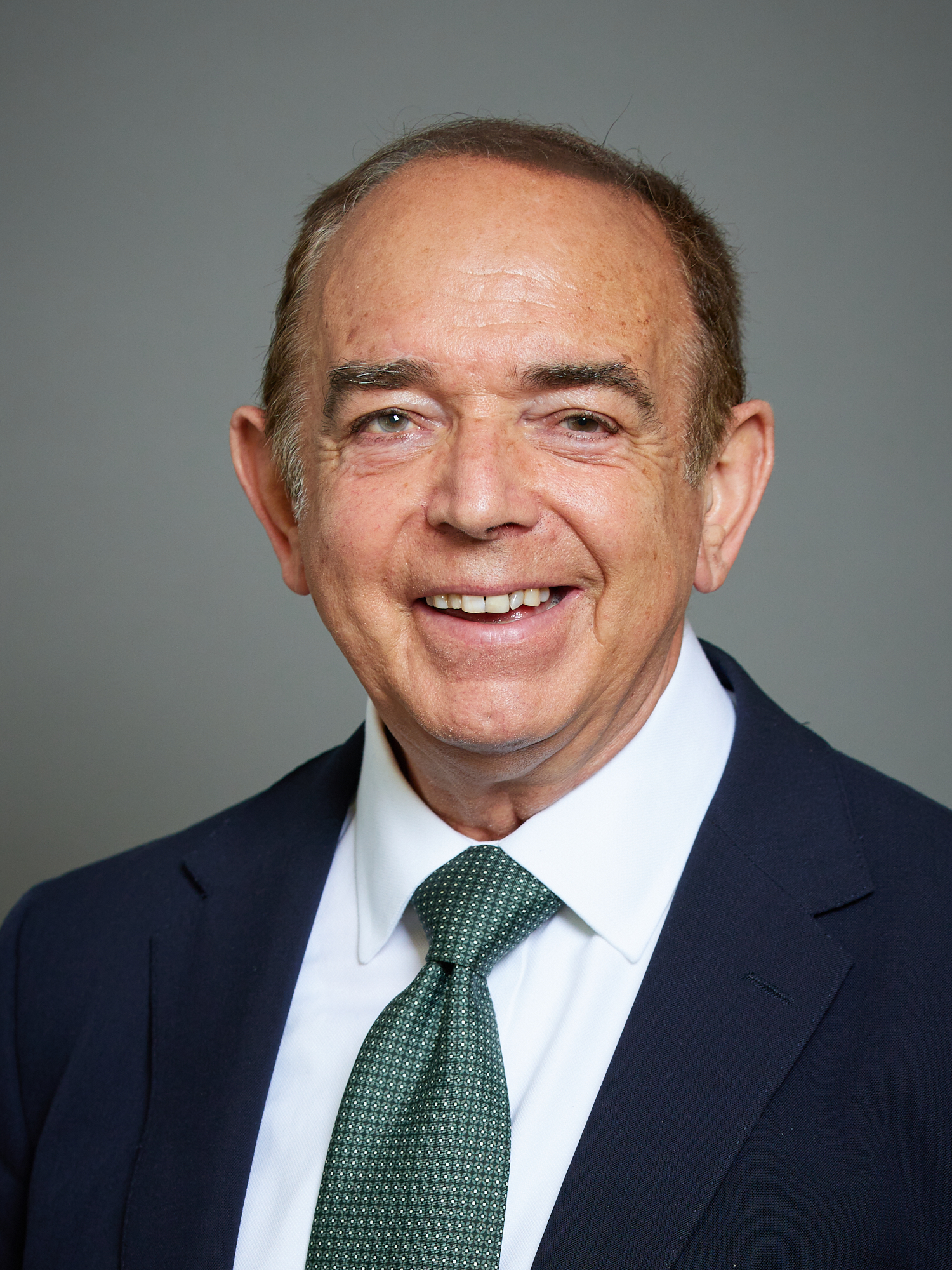
- Official portrait, 2022

Parliamentary Under-Secretary of State for Wales
- In office 27 October 2017 – 26 July 2019
- Prime Minister: Theresa May
- Preceded by: The Lord Duncan of Springbank
- Succeeded by: Office abolished
- In office 12 May 2015 – 17 June 2017
- Prime Minister: David Cameron; Theresa May
- Preceded by: The Baroness Randerson
- Succeeded by: The Lord Duncan of Springbank

Parliamentary Under-Secretary of State for Faith
- In office 17 July 2016 – 26 July 2019
- Prime Minister: Theresa May
- Preceded by: Eric Pickles (2015)
- Succeeded by: The Viscount Younger of Leckie

Parliamentary Under-Secretary of State for Northern Ireland
- In office 14 June 2017 – 27 October 2017
- Prime Minister: Theresa May
- Preceded by: The Lord Dunlop
- Succeeded by: The Lord Duncan of Springbank

Parliamentary Under-Secretary of State for Energy and Climate Change
- In office 12 May 2015 – 17 July 2016
- Prime Minister: David Cameron
- Preceded by: The Baroness Verma
- Succeeded by: Position abolished

Lord-in-waiting Government Whip
- In office 13 August 2014 – 17 July 2016
- Prime Minister: David Cameron
- Preceded by: The Baroness Northover
- Succeeded by: The Baroness Mobarik

Leader of the Opposition
- In office 11 July 2007 – 5 May 2011
- Monarch: Elizabeth II
- First Minister: Rhodri Morgan; Carwyn Jones
- Preceded by: Ieuan Wyn Jones
- Succeeded by: Paul Davies

Leader of the Welsh Conservative Party
- In office 18 August 1999 – 6 May 2011
- Deputy: Andrew RT Davies
- Leader: William Hague; Iain Duncan Smith; Michael Howard; David Cameron
- Preceded by: Rod Richards
- Succeeded by: Andrew RT Davies (Note: Paul Davies served as interim leader between 6 May 2011 and 14 July 2011.)

Member of the Welsh Assembly for Mid and West Wales
- In office 6 May 1999 – 6 May 2011
- Preceded by: Office Created
- Succeeded by: William Powell

Member of the House of Lords
- Lord Temporal
- Life peerage 9 September 2013

Personal details
- Born: Nicholas Henry Bourne; 1 January 1952 (age 74)
- Party: Conservative
- Education: University of Wales, Aberystwyth; Trinity College, Cambridge
- Occupation: University lecturer, politician

Nicholas Henry Bourne, Baron Bourne of Aberystwyth (born 1 January 1952) is a Conservative Party politician who served as Leader of the Welsh Conservative Party and Member of the Welsh Assembly for Mid and West Wales from August 1999 until May 2011.

During the 2011 National Assembly for Wales election he unexpectedly lost his regional list seat, due to Conservative gains at constituency level. He was elevated to the House of Lords in September 2013, and the following year, became a government whip.

== Education ==
Bourne was the first of two children of John Morgan Bourne and his wife, Joan Edith Mary Bourne. He was educated at King Edward VI School, Chelmsford; University of Wales, Aberystwyth; and Trinity College, Cambridge, where he was President of Cambridge University Lawyers and Treasurer of Cambridge University Conservative Association. He is the Honorary President of Aberystwyth University Conservative Future. He obtained the bachelor of laws (First Class Honours) and LLM from University of Wales and the LLM from Trinity College, Cambridge. He was called to the Bar by the Honourable Society of Grays Inn.

== Professional career ==
A former professor of law, Bourne has been Assistant Principal of Swansea Institute of Higher Education, and was a visiting lecturer at Hong Kong University and an author of various legal textbooks on Commercial and Company Law.

In 2015, Bourne was made a fellow of Aberystwyth University and in 2018, he received the Honorary degree of LLD from the University of Wales, Trinity St David.

== Political career ==
Bourne was the Conservative Party candidate in the 1984 Chesterfield by-election, having stood in the same constituency at the previous year's general election. He fought the Worcester constituency in the 1997 general election. He was the Conservatives' chief spokesman in Wales, and led the unsuccessful "Just Say NO" campaign against Welsh devolution, during the 1997 referendum. After the referendum, he served on the National Assembly Advisory Group, the body that set up the institution's working arrangements.

First elected to the National Assembly for Wales in 1999, and re-elected in 2003 and 2007. Bourne headed the regional list for the Conservatives for the entire period that he was in the National Assembly. Bourne sat on the Assembly's European and External Affairs committee and was the party's spokesman on constitutional matters. He was the leader of the Welsh Conservatives from August 1999, and Leader of the Opposition in the National Assembly from July 2007. Following a minor reshuffle in June 2008, Bourne also became the Shadow Minister for Finance and Public Service Delivery remaining in the post until 22 October 2008.

In the National Assembly, his political interests included the economy, foreign affairs, health and education. Bourne also supports charities and organizations in Wales, including the NSPCC, the National Trust, and the British Heart Foundation.

Bourne campaigned for rural communities, opposing onshore wind farm developments, the closure of post offices and small schools, and supporting improved health care provision in non-urban areas. He campaigned on issues such as the need for a referendum on plans to give the assembly law making powers and supported the campaign for more legislative powers when David Cameron granted a referendum, the future of the National Botanic Garden, and on the growing cost of government in Wales. He is a member of the Doctors and Dentists Pay Review Body.

In 2005, he was presented with the Local Campaigner of the Year Award by BBC show AM.PM; he also won AM of the Year from ITV.

In 2011, he was nominated by the Welsh Conservatives as their representative on the Commission on Devolution in Wales, chaired by Paul Silk. He was also appointed by Edwina Hart to chair the Haven Waterway Enterprise Zone from 2012 to August 2014. In addition, he served as the Conservative representative on the Williams Commission on Public Service Governance and Delivery.

Bourne was created a life peer on 9 September 2013, taking the title Baron Bourne of Aberystwyth, of Aberystwyth in the County of Ceredigion, and of Wethersfield in the County of Essex.

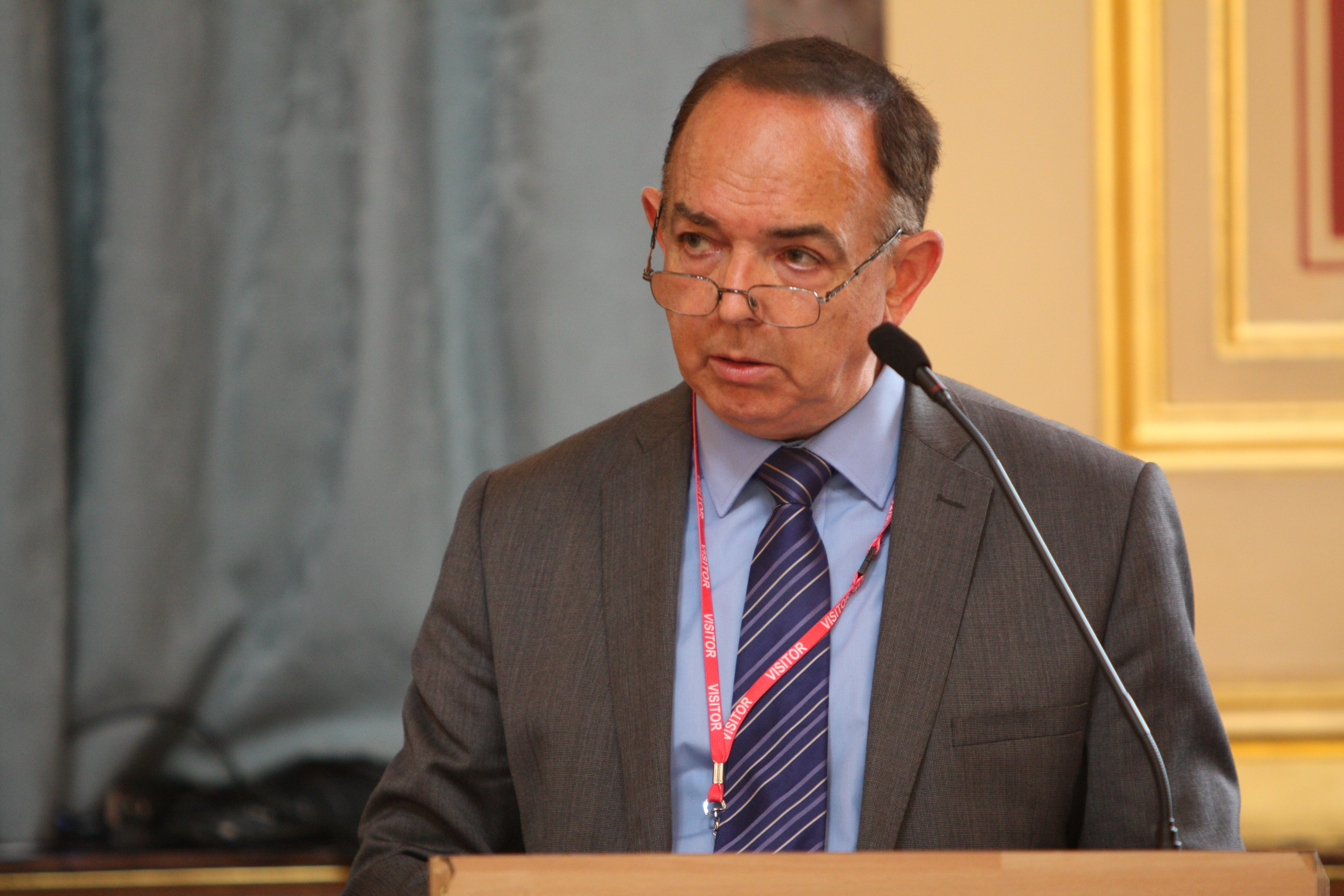
Bourne speaks at the International Energy Agency Energy and Climate Change report launch in London on June 15, 2015.

Lord Bourne was made a whip in the House of Lords on 11 August 2014, replacing Lord Bates who had been promoted as part of a mini-reshuffle following the resignation of Baroness Warsi. During this period he was responsible for piloting the Pensions Schemes Bill through the House of Lords.

In May 2015, he was appointed Parliamentary Under-Secretary of State jointly for DECC and the Wales Office.

During 2017, Lord Bourne moved to the Northern Ireland Office before returning later in the year to the Wales Office, a post he continued to hold until his resignation in July 2019. At the same time, until his resignation, he was Parliamentary Under-Secretary of State in the Ministry of Housing, Communities and Local Government.

Lord Bourne received the National "No to Hate Crime Award" for 2019 from the Anti-Hate Organisation Tell MAMA which campaigns against Islamophobia and anti-Muslim hatred. In December 2019, Lord Bourne was appointed President of Remembering Srebrenica, a British charity initiative which is dedicated to bringing communities together to combat prejudice and intolerance. In particular, it also seeks to inculcate lessons of the genocide in Bosnia Herzegovina in 1995.

== Offices held ==
Senedd
New creation Creation of National Assembly	Member of the Senedd for Mid and West Wales; 1999 – 2011	Succeeded by William Powell
Political offices
Preceded by Rod Richards	Leader of the Welsh Conservative Party; 1999 – 2011	Succeeded by Paul Davies (interim)
Political offices
Preceded by Ieuan Wyn Jones	Leader of the Opposition; 2007 – 2011	Succeeded by Paul Davies
Preceded by Angela Burns	Shadow Minister for Finance and Public Service Delivery; 2008; 14 June 2008 – 22 October 2008	Succeeded by Nick Ramsay
Orders of precedence in the United Kingdom
Preceded by The Lord Wrigglesworth	Gentlemen; Baron Bourne of Aberystwyth	Followed by The Lord Whitby
