= Rod Richards =

Welsh and British Conservative politician (1947–2019)

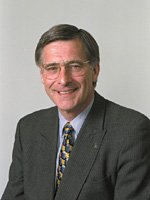

Leader of the Welsh Conservative Party
- In office 12 May 1999 – 18 August 1999
- Leader: William Hague
- Preceded by: Office established
- Succeeded by: Nick Bourne

Member of the Welsh Assembly for North Wales
- In office 6 May 1999 – 10 September 2002
- Preceded by: Constituency established
- Succeeded by: David Jones

Parliamentary Under-Secretary of State for Wales
- In office 20 July 1994 – 2 June 1996
- Prime Minister: John Major
- Preceded by: Nicholas Bennett
- Succeeded by: Jonathan Evans

Member of Parliament for Clwyd North West
- In office 9 April 1992 – 8 April 1997
- Preceded by: Sir Anthony Meyer
- Succeeded by: Constituency abolished

Personal details
- Born: 12 March 1947 Llanelli, Wales
- Died: 13 July 2019 (aged 72) Penarth, Wales
- Party: UK Independence Party (2013–2019)
- Other political affiliations: Conservative (until 2013)
- Children: 3
- Education: Llandovery College, Aberystwyth University

Roderick Richards (12 March 1947 – 13 July 2019) was a British politician who was leader of the Welsh Conservatives from 1996 to 1999, and a Welsh Assembly member (AM) for the North Wales region from 1999 until 2003.

Prior to this, Richards was the Member of Parliament for Clwyd North West, in Wales, from 1992 to 1997.

He later defected to the UK Independence Party (UKIP) in 2013.

== Early life ==
Richards was born in Llanelli to Ivor George Richards and Lizzie Jane Richards (née Evans). Welsh-speaking Richards was educated at Llandovery College and at Swansea University where he gained a first class honours degree in economics and statistics. On 22 September 1969 he began training as a Royal Marines Officer. He failed to complete training and therefore was never commissioned into the Corps. Contrary to various published CVs he never served in Northern Ireland as a Royal Marines officer. He served on the intelligence staff of the Ministry of Defence, and worked as an economic forecaster. Richards, at one point, worked for MI6

Richards first rose to public prominence in the 1980s as a Welsh-language newsreader for BBC Wales.

== Political career ==
=== UK Parliament ===
He first tried to enter parliament at the 1987 general election, when he stood unsuccessfully for the Carmarthen seat, giving up his job with the BBC to do so. He was unsuccessful again two years later at a by-election for the Vale of Glamorgan, again giving up his work as a broadcaster, but at the 1992 general election he was elected as MP for the former parliamentary seat of Clwyd North West. During John Major's government he was appointed Parliamentary Private Secretary in the Foreign and Commonwealth Office in 1993 and Welsh Office junior minister in 1994, but was forced to resign in 1996 when news of an extra-marital affair surfaced.

At the 1997 general election, Richards stood for re-election in the successor constituency of Clwyd West, but lost to Gareth Thomas of the Labour Party.

He made several attempted Parliamentary comebacks, but failed to secure the nomination for Clwyd West ahead of the May 2001 general election, and was reported to be looking at several 'safe' conservative seats in England.

=== National Assembly for Wales ===
Although defeated in his constituency seat during the first Welsh Assembly elections in 1999, he was elected to the new body as lead candidate on the Conservatives' regional top-up list. He was elected the Welsh Conservative Party Leader in a ballot of Welsh party members defeating Nick Bourne, who was then widely known in the media to be William Hague's first choice for the job. Richards stood down as leader after he was charged with inflicting grievous bodily harm on a young woman. Bourne was then appointed leader by Hague. Richards was cleared of assault in June 2000.

Richards had the party whip withdrawn from him following his decision to abstain rather than vote with his fellow Conservatives against the Assembly's budget at the end of 1999. He continued to sit in the Assembly, as an 'Independent Conservative' until September 2002 when he resigned as an Assembly Member (AM) due to problems with alcohol.

Richards and his successor, Nick Bourne were known for hating one another. In one interview, Richards said he would consider opposing Bourne if the latter stood for Police Commissioner. When Bourne lost his seat in the 2011 Assembly election, Rod Richards was quoted in the Western Mail saying, "It has been a great week, bin Laden on Sunday Bourne on Friday." Osama bin Laden had been killed by American special forces in the days before polling day.

Once Bourne had been appointed party leader by William Hague, he refused to give Richards a portfolio in his 25 August reshuffle, leaving him as the only Welsh Conservative backbencher. Richards stated, "We are perfectly happy to continue to promote the Welsh language. But we will not discriminate against those Welsh people who don't speak Welsh, or indeed anyone else who comes to live in Wales"; and, on Plaid Cymru, "They are an anti-British party. They reject everything that is British: our history, our values, our great achievements, our language, indeed the very existence of our British family. ... They want Wales out of the United Kingdom and into a federal European state. They want separation from England so that Wales can be ruled by Brussels."

=== Defection to UKIP ===
In July 2013, Richards defected to UKIP, after becoming "disillusioned with mainstream parties". He refused to be drawn on whether he wanted to seek UKIP's candidacy in the 2014 European Parliament election. Its then current MEP for Wales, John Bufton, stood down in June 2014, being replaced by Nathan Gill.

== Personal life ==
Richards was married to a psychologist, Liz, until their divorce, after revelations in June 1996 of his extra-marital affair. The couple had three children.

In 1999, while Welsh Conservative leader, Richards was charged with inflicting grievous bodily harm on a young woman but was acquitted after trial.

At the High Court in London in February 2003, Richards was declared bankrupt with debts estimated at more than £300,000, which he linked to alcoholism.

It was reported on 17 April 2008 that Richards had been arrested in connection with an alleged assault on a Conservative party worker. He was later released after receiving a caution from police. Richards became angry when the councillor, who was canvassing door-to-door, told him he hadn't been sent promotional literature as he was already listed as a prominent party member. When later asked about the incident, Richards said that he gave the young councillor, who was "half his age and twice his size", a "clip around the ear" for "being cheeky". He attributed the incident to lack of sleep.

He died of cancer on 13 July 2019 at the age of 72.

== Offices held ==
Parliament of the United Kingdom
Preceded by Sir Anthony Meyer	Member of Parliament for Clwyd North West; 1992 – 1997	Constituency abolished
Senedd
Preceded by (new post)	Assembly Member for North Wales; 1999–2002	Succeeded by David Ian Jones
Political offices
Preceded by (new post)	Leader of the Welsh Conservatives in the National Assembly; 1999 – 1999	Succeeded by Nick Bourne
