= Garel Rhys =

British academic (1940–2017)

Professor Emeritus Garel Rhys CBE FIMI SMMT
- Born: David Garel Rhys; 28 February 1940; Swansea, Wales, United Kingdom
- Died: 21 February 2017 (aged 76); Radyr, Wales
- Education: Swansea University; University of Birmingham
- Occupation: Professor of Motor Industry Economics at Cardiff Business School
- Spouse: Charlotte Mavis Rhys (m. 1965)
- Children: 3
- Relatives: Rhodri Morgan (second cousin); Prys Morgan (second cousin)

David Garel Rhys CBE FIMI SMMT (28 February 1940 – 21 February 2017) was a Welsh academic and a commentator of long standing on Motor Industry matters in Britain, who was Professor of Motor Industry Economics, and Director for Automotive Industry Research at Cardiff Business School.

== Early life ==
David attended Ystalyfera Grammar School at Ystalyfera, then in West Glamorgan, now in Neath Port Talbot. He studied at University College, Swansea, then the University of Birmingham.

== Career ==
From 1984 to 2005 he was Professor of Motor Industry Economics at Cardiff University.

== Personal life ==
He married in 1965 to Charlotte Mavis Walters. The couple have one son and two daughters, and four grandchildren including Evan. He was the second cousin of Rhodri Morgan, the former First Minister of Wales.

He was invested as an Officer of the Order of the British Empire in 1989, and as a Commander of the Order of the British Empire in 2007 for services to economic research in Wales. He was a Liveryman of the Worshipful Company of Carmen, and was granted the Freedom of the City of London in 2000.

== Publications ==
- The Motor Industry: An Economic Survey (1971)
- The Motor Industry in the European Community (1989)
- Outsourcing and Human Resource Management (contributor, 2008)

== See also ==
- Prof Peter Wells, Professor of Business and Sustainability at Cardiff Business School
- Welsh Automotive Forum
