= 2000 Welsh Labour leadership election =

2000 Labour Party in Wales leadership election
- 11 February 2000
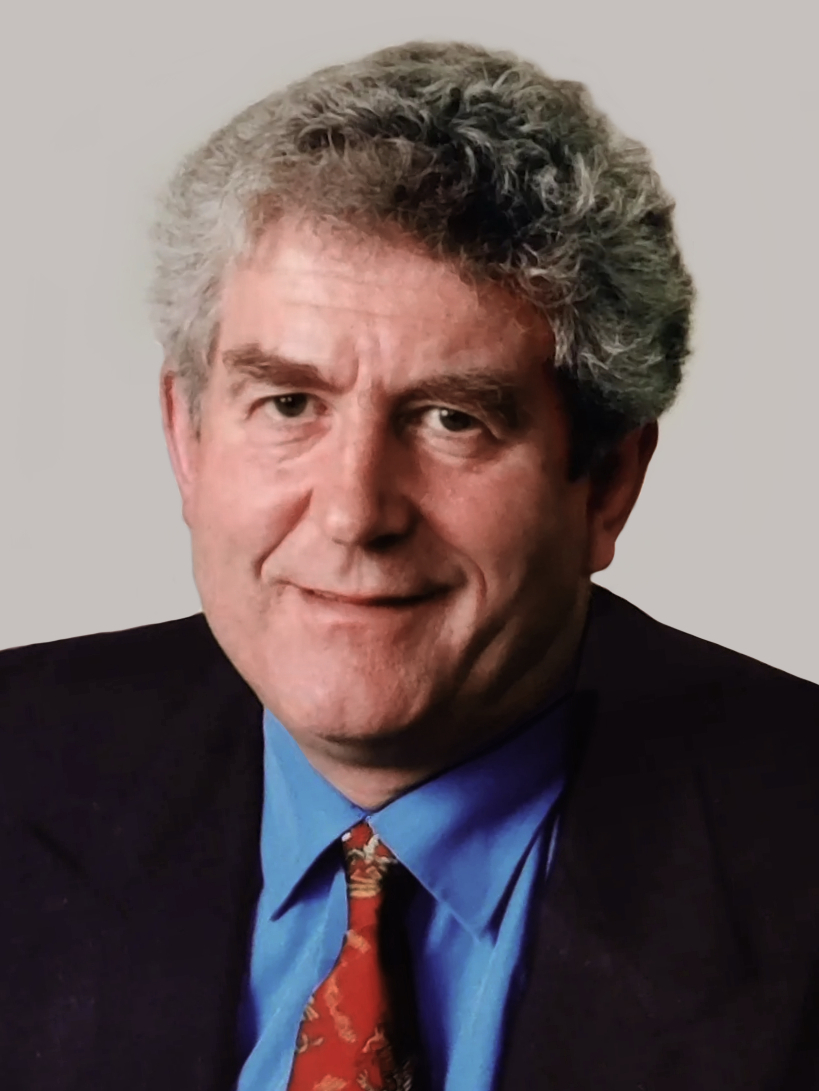
Candidate	Rhodri Morgan
Popular vote	Unopposed
Leader before election
Rhodri Morgan (pro tempore);
previously Alun Michael (Note: Following Michael's resignation as first secretary and Labour leader on 9 February, Morgan was installed as its acting leader.)
Elected Leader
Rhodri Morgan

The 2000 Labour Party in Wales leadership election was held on 11 February 2000 after the resignation of Alun Michael as first secretary of Wales and leader of the Labour Party in Wales on 9 February 2000. Rhodri Morgan, who had unsuccessfully challenged Michael in the previous leadership election in 1999, was elected unopposed as the new leader of the party in the National Assembly for Wales and was later nominated unopposed by the assembly as the new first secretary on 15 February.

Michael had become the leader of the Labour Party in Wales in 1998, when he was appointed as its acting leader after the resignation of his predecessor Ron Davies. A centrist Blairite, he defeated the soft left MP Rhodri Morgan in a leadership contest in 1999 and was elected leader. Both men were elected to the National Assembly for Wales at the first assembly election in 1999, with Michael becoming the first-ever first secretary of Wales as Labour's leader in the new legislature, which had won the most seats at the election and formed a minority administration in the assembly.

A few months into his premiership, Michael's administration faced a political and constitutional crisis. The opposition parties in the assembly joined forces to outnumber Michael's party in votes, leading to a political deadlock in the assembly. In February 2000, they used their joint numbers to pass a motion of no confidence in Michael as first secretary, which would mandate his resignation under the standing orders of the assembly. Michael resigned as both first secretary and Labour leader and Rhodri Morgan was elected unopposed at a meeting of the party's Welsh executive and assembly group to succeed him.

== Background ==
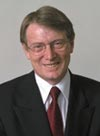
Alun Michael, first secretary of Wales from 1998 to 2000

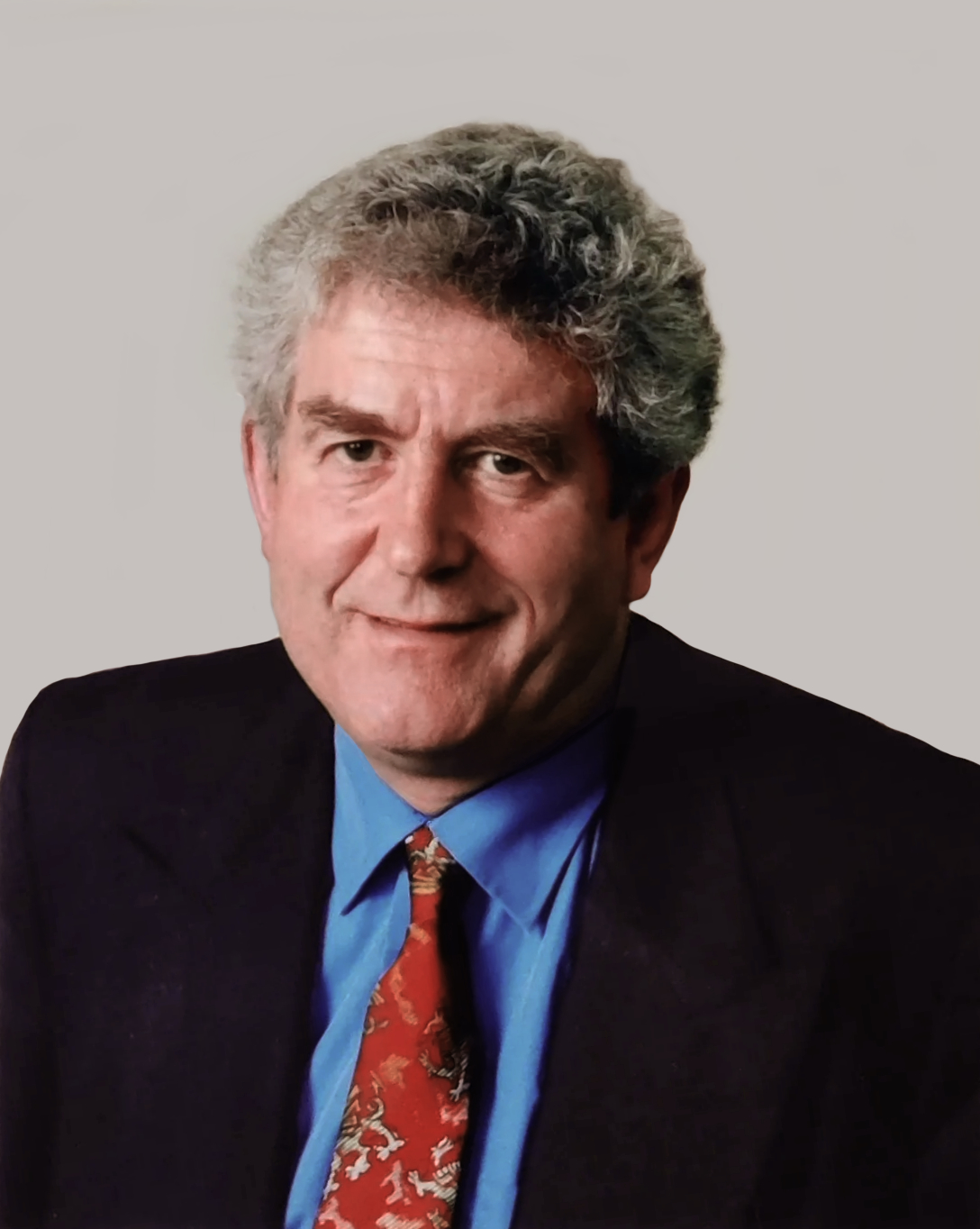
Rhodri Morgan, first secretary of Wales from 2000

The Labour Party in Wales was granted its own devolved, elected leadership by the UK Labour Party following the successful Welsh devolution referendum in 1997. The first leadership contest was held in September 1998 with two candidates, the soft left MPs Ron Davies and Rhodri Morgan, standing for the leadership. Davies won the election and became the first leader of Labour in Wales but resigned in October after he was mugged on Clapham Common. UK Labour leader Tony Blair appointed centrist Blairite MP Alun Michael as the acting leader of the party and backed him in a second leadership election in February 1999, again contested by Morgan. In this election, the UK party leadership imposed an electoral college to improve Michael's chances of victory. As a result, Michael won the election despite winning less votes overall than Morgan.

Both Michael and Morgan were elected to the National Assembly for Wales at the first election to the institution in May 1999. Labour won 28 seats in the election, enough to form a minority administration with the most seats out of all parties but three seats short of an overall majority. As its leader in the assembly, Michael became the first-ever first secretary of Wales. He appointed Morgan to his administration as his economic development secretary. In time, he came to be considered as Michael's de facto deputy.

A few months into his premiership, Michael's administration faced a political and constitutional crisis which had been triggered by a successful assembly censure motion against his agriculture secretary Christine Gwyther in October 1999, which Michael chose to ignore. The opposition parties in the assembly joined forces to outnumber Michael's party in votes which led to a political deadlock. They pressed Michael on the issue of match funding from HM Treasury to qualify for European Union (EU) Objective One funding for deprived areas of Wales, threatening a motion of no confidence in him as first secretary if he failed to persuade the Treasury to give his administration the funding required. A successful no confidence motion mandated the resignation of the first secretary as per the assembly's standing orders.

The opposition parties in the assembly pressed ahead with the no confidence motion in February 2000, after Michael said the funding would not be forthcoming until the government's spending review in July 2000. By this point, there were five members of the Labour group in the assembly who were considered loyal to Michael. In private, around 18 of the 28 Labour assembly members (AMs) indicated their preference for Morgan to lead the party and serve as first secretary over Michael. Michael lost the support of the majority of Labour AMs ahead of the motion. In the event of his resignation as first secretary, they had agreed not to renominate him for the premiership and to back Morgan instead. Michael lost the motion on 9 February after the opposition parties joined their numbers to outvote Labour and make it pass. He resigned as first secretary of Wales and leader of the Labour Party in Wales. The cabinet appointed Morgan as the acting first secretary in the immediate aftermath of the vote.

== Campaign ==
Following Michael's resignation, Morgan was installed as the acting leader of the Labour Party in Wales until 11 February, when a leadership election would be held at a meeting of the Welsh Executive Committee (WEC) and the Labour group in the assembly to confirm a permanent leader. As a result of the unusual circumstances around the election, a ballot of party members would not be held. The WEC endorsed the cabinet's appointment of Morgan as acting first secretary and agreed with the cabinet to put him forward as Labour's nomination for first secretary at the nomination vote in the assembly, which had been scheduled for 15 February and expected to confirm Morgan into the office. Labour's nomination for first secretary would also be confirmed at the meeting on 11 February.

According to BBC News, Morgan would "almost certainly" be confirmed as the permanent leader on 11 February. He launched his leadership campaign on 10 February. It was suggested that Michael could stand again for the leadership to regain the premiership, an option he had considered in advance of the motion of no confidence, but it was expected that he would lose to Morgan if he chose to do so; his decision to resign without consulting the Labour group made the more neutral members of the group swing to Morgan's camp and support him for the leadership. Three of the group's whips, Huw Lewis, Lorraine Barrett, and Janice Gregory, resigned from their posts, reportedly in protest of an alleged plot led by the chief whip Andrew Davies to remove Michael as leader. The three members were Michael loyalists. They voiced their disapproval for what they claimed were the "antics" of Morgan's supporters in the days surrounding Michael's resignation, but still endorsed Morgan for the leadership.

Outside the group, the UK Labour leadership backed Morgan for the leadership, with a spokesperson for Tony Blair adding that he had proved his loyalty as a member of Michael's administration and "earned his spurs". Jeff Jones, the leader of Bridgend County Borough Council, called on Michael to return as leader and first secretary, arguing that another leader would make no difference to the political crisis in Wales. Former Labour prime minister James Callaghan supported the notion of Morgan as first secretary but also called on Blair to bring Michael back into the British cabinet. Michael had previously served in the cabinet prior to his election to the National Assembly in 1999 and had continued to serve as an MP since then.

== Results ==
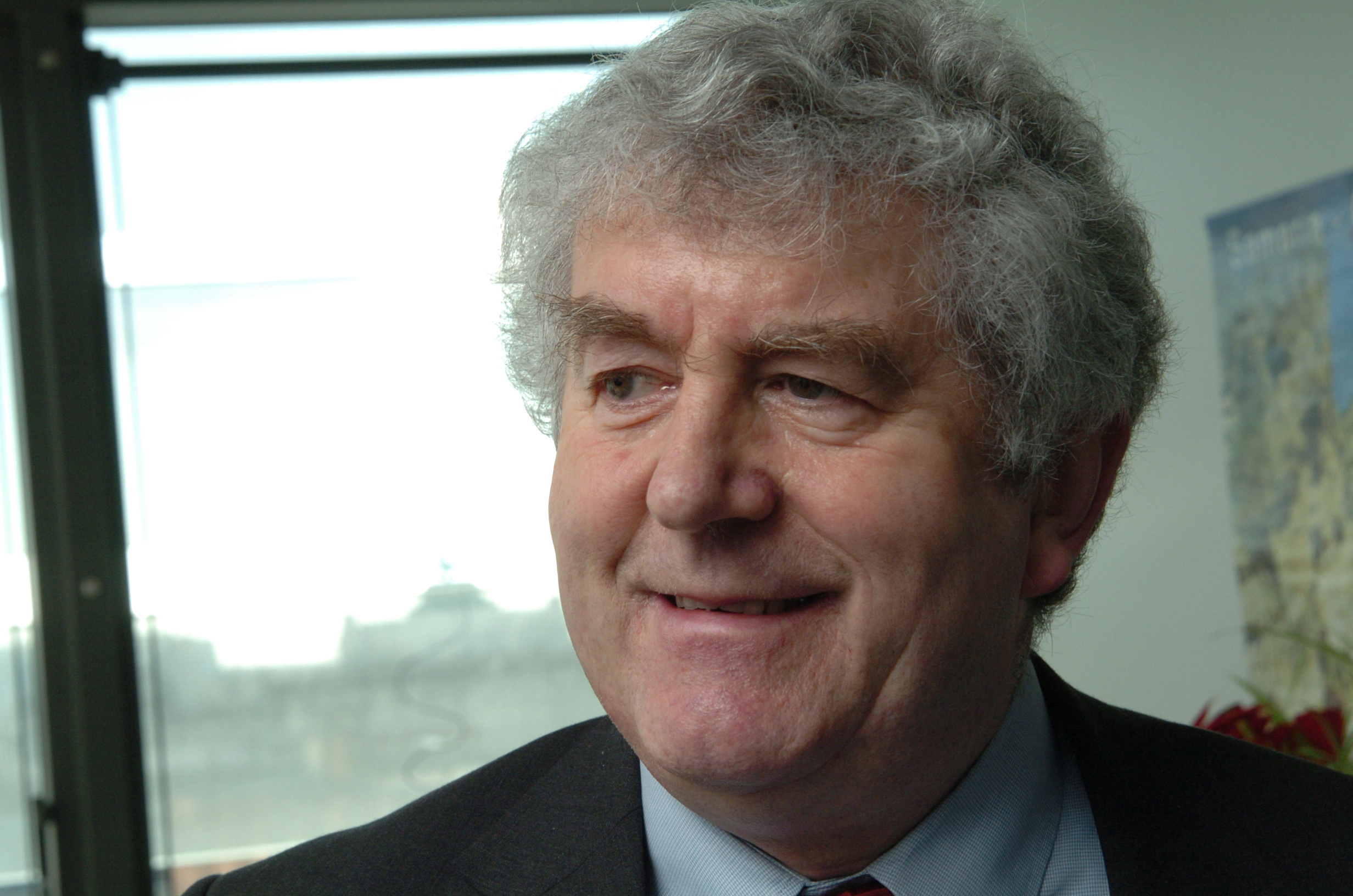
At the meeting of the WEC and Labour group on 11 February, Rhodri Morgan was elected unopposed as the new leader of Labour in Wales

At the meeting of the WEC and Labour group on 11 February, which was held in Cardiff, Morgan was the only person nominated for the leadership. He was elected unopposed as the new leader of the Labour Party in Wales and the National Assembly for Wales, as well as its formal nominee for first secretary of Wales, with the unanimous support of all 28 members of the Labour group in the assembly. Compared to the last two leadership elections in the party, this election was more trouble-free. Michael congratulated Morgan on his election. In his victory speech, Morgan pledged to rebuild his party's relationship with its supporters in its traditional strongholds, adding that he would "not be Blair's puppet". He said he wanted "to see the Labour Party in Wales embrace devolution and democracy in its own structures as well as the National Assembly" and added that its leader had to "try to embody the aspirations of ordinary Labour voters and members in Wales, and not be the tool of machine politics". This signalled a change in direction for the party compared to under Michael, with Morgan seeking to make the party in Wales more autonomous than it had been previously. Morgan was nominated unopposed to the office of first secretary on 15 February. He formed his new administration later in the month, making limited changes to the cabinet pending potential agreements with other parties later in the year.
