= 1998 Welsh Labour leadership election =

Welsh Labour Party leadership election

- 19 September 1998
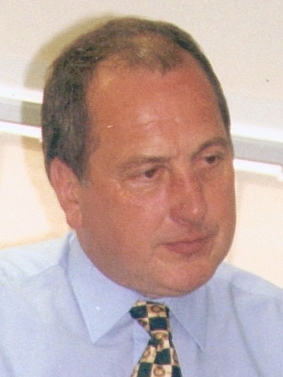

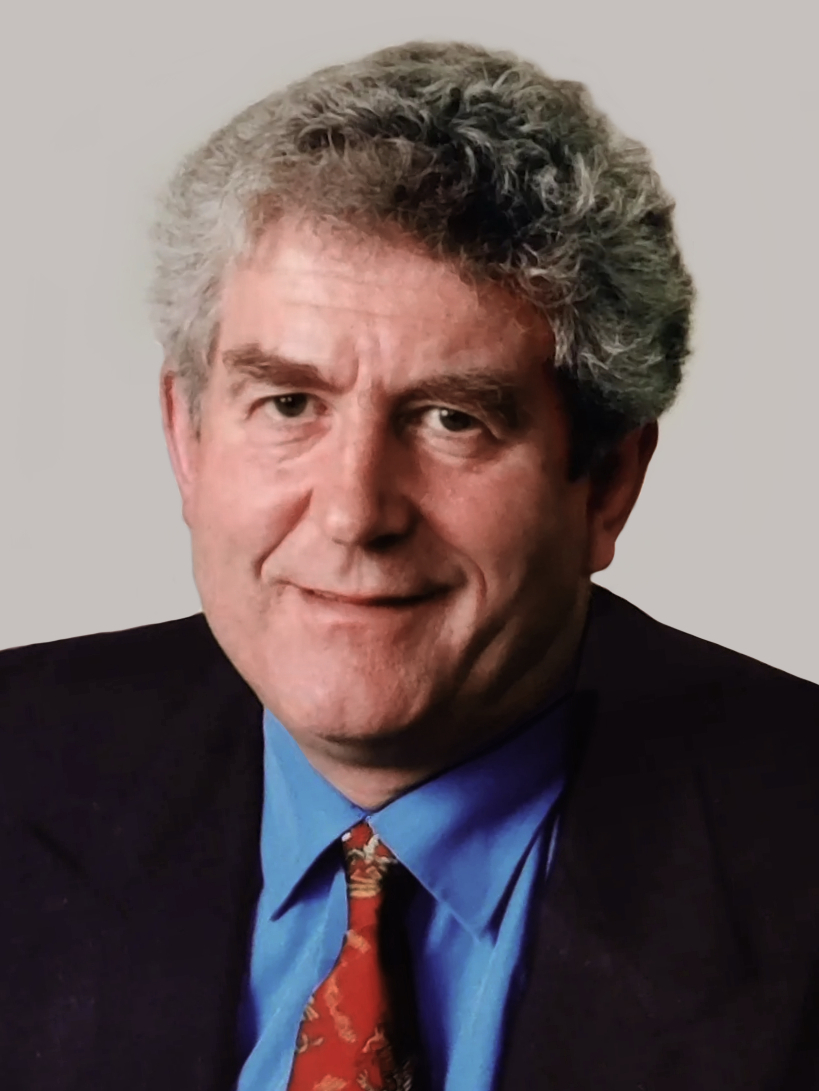
Candidate	Ron Davies	Rhodri Morgan
Overall Result	68%	32%
Elected Leader
Ron Davies

The 1998 Welsh Labour Party leadership election was held on 19 September 1998. Secretary of State for Wales Ron Davies was elected as Welsh Labour Leader and nominee for First Secretary.

== Candidates ==
- Ron Davies, Member of Parliament for Caerphilly since 1983 and Secretary of State for Wales since May 1997.
- Rhodri Morgan, Member of Parliament for Cardiff West since 1987, backbencher, Chair of Public Administration and Constitutional Affairs Select Committee since May 1997.

== Result ==
Ron Davies won with 68% of the vote, winning all three sections of Welsh Labour's electoral college formed from the party's Welsh MPs, MEPs approved assembly candidates, the trade unions and the party's members.

In his memoirs, Rhodri Morgan wrote:

"[The Welsh MPs] went heavily for Ron, although I kept majority among the approved panel of Assembly candidates down to 32-22. Of the candidates subsequently elected to the Assembly it was 4-4. The unions went for Ron, even my own union the T&G. The party members' vote split much more evenly, but I didn't maintain the early success I'd had in Aberavon and Swansea [CLPs], although I did get a majority of the constituency nominations."

== Aftermath ==
Davies served until his resignation just over a month later on 29 October 1998, two days after resigning as Secretary of State for Wales on 27 October 1998. He stood down citing "an error of judgement" in agreeing to go for what he said was a meal with a man he had met while walking on Clapham Common in London, which is a well-known gay meeting place. He was mugged at knifepoint. The full details of the incident (which he described as a "moment of madness" at the urging of Tony Blair's Press secretary Alastair Campbell) have never emerged.

Morgan contested the next leadership election, but lost to Alun Michael, Morgan was then elected unopposed in the third leadership election in three years in February 2000, holding the position until December 2009.

== See also ==
- 1998 Scottish Labour leadership election
