= WAF =

WAF, or waf, may refer to:

== Computing ==
- Waf, a software build system written in the Python programming language
- Web application firewall, a proxy device with protocol awareness of HTTP
- Web application framework, a software framework that is designed to support the development of dynamic websites, Web applications and Web services
- Write amplification factor

== Culture ==
- World Architecture Festival, an annual festival and awards ceremony for architecture
- "Wabash Always Fights," the rallying cheer of Wabash College

== Organisations ==
- Welsh Automotive Forum, a company that lobbies the UK government on behalf of the automotive industry in Wales
- Women's Air Force (WAF), organized in 1948 and active until 1976
- Women for America First, an American conservative activist organisation
- Workers Autonomous Federation, one of several underground trade unions in the People's Republic of China
- World Archery Federation, a governing sports body
- World Apostolate of Fátima, a Roman Catholic movement to promote a faith according to the apparitions at Fátima
- World Armwrestling Federation, a federation of arm wrestling associations which organises world championships
- Wydad de Fès (Wydad Athletic de Fès), a Moroccan association football club

== Science and technology ==
- WAF1, a protein implicated in p53 transcriptional regulation
- Weather and Forecasting, an American Meteorological Society journal
- Width across flats, the distance between the two flats of a wrench (UK: spanner) or socket
- Wife acceptance factor (or wife approval factor or wife appeal factor), a colloquialism used in discussions related to hi-fi and home theater equipment, home automation

== Transport ==
- Wah Fu station, a proposed MTR station in Hong Kong (MTR station code)
- Wallyford railway station, East Lothian, Scotland (National Rail station code)

== Other ==
- 'With all faults', a phrase used as a disclaimer of any implied warranty of merchantability (often appears in descriptions of second-hand books, cars, knowledge, etc.)
