= Emma Wools =

British police commissioner

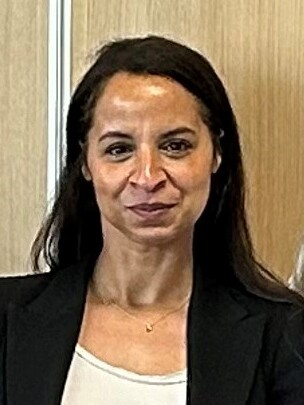
- Wools in 2024

South Wales Police and Crime Commissioner
- Incumbent
- Assumed office 9 May 2024
- Preceded by: Alun Michael

Deputy South Wales Police and Crime Commissioner
- In office 14 November 2016 – 8 May 2024
- Appointed by: Alun Michael
- Preceded by: Sophie Howe

Personal details
- Party: Labour and Co-operative Party
- Education: University of South Wales

Emma Wools is a Welsh Labour and Co-operative Party politician serving as South Wales Police and Crime Commissioner since 2024. She previously worked in the probation service, and served as Deputy Police and Crime Commissioner from 2016 to 2024.

== Life & Education ==
Wools was born and raised in Cardiff and studied Psychology at the University of South Wales.

== Professional career ==
Wools worked in probation. She held various roles in this time, including Head of Offender Service Integration within the National Offender Management Service, overseeing partnerships across public sector prisons and the National Probation Service.

Wools was awarded the Next Generation Leader award by the Leading Wales Awards in 2016.

Since 2021, Wools has jointly chaired the Policing in Wales Taskforce on Violence Against Women, Domestic Abuse and Sexual violence, alongside Eleri Thomas, Deputy Police and Crime Commissioner for Gwent.

In May 2023, Wools received recognition from the Ethnic Minority Welsh Women Achievement Association for her leadership.

== Political career ==
In 2023, it was announced that Wools would be the Labour candidate for the 2024 South Wales Police and Crime Commissioner election, after Alun Michael announced he would be stepping down from the role. She was selected by a Labour Party panel, prompting allegations of a "stitch-up".

In 2024, Wools won the 2024 South Wales Police and Crime Commissioner election, becoming Wales' first Black Police and Crime Commissioner.
