= 1999 Welsh Labour leadership election =

Welsh Labour Party leadership election

- 20 February 1999
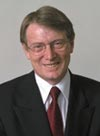

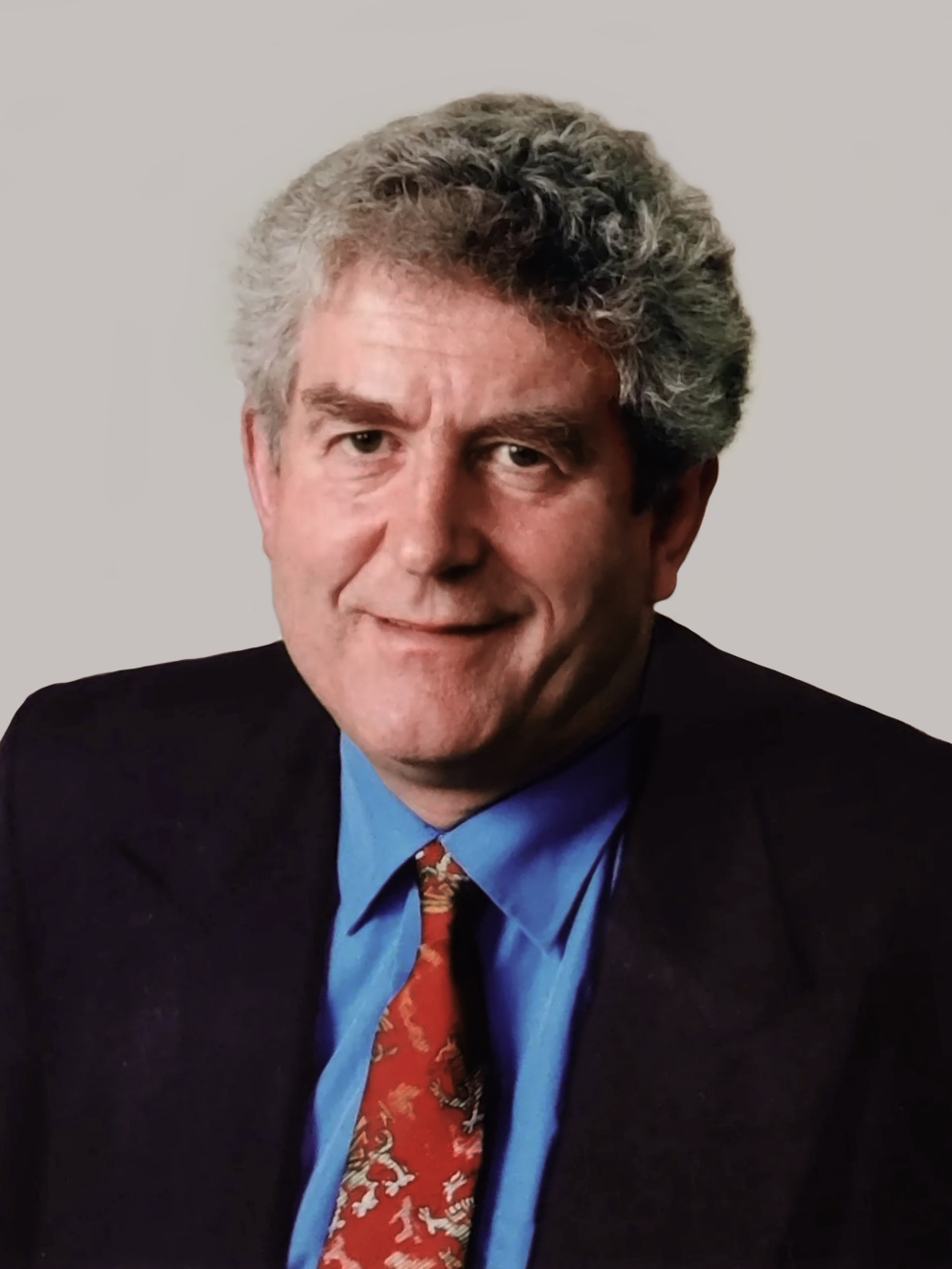
Candidate	Alun Michael	Rhodri Morgan
Overall Result	52.7%	47.3%
Affiliated unions	64.0%	36.0%
Party members	35.7%	64.3%
Elected officials	58.4%	41.6%
Leader before election
Ron Davies
Elected Leader
Alun Michael

The 1999 Welsh Labour leadership election was held on 20 February 1999. Alun Michael was elected as Labour's nominee for First Secretary. Michael would go on to become First Secretary in a minority Labour government following the 1999 Assembly election. Runner up Rhodri Morgan went on to serve in Michael's first cabinet and then succeeded him as First Secretary in February 2000.

== Background ==
In the 1997 general election, the Labour Party won a landslide victory against the governing Conservative Party, returning to government after 18 years in opposition. Labour's election manifesto included a commitment to hold a devolution referendum in Wales to determine whether to establish a devolved Welsh assembly. The 1997 Welsh devolution referendum returned a narrow majority in favour of devolution and led to the establishment of the devolved National Assembly for Wales in May 1999. The assembly would be led by the First Secretary of Wales. As Labour was expected to win the most seats in the first election to the assembly, scheduled for May 1999, its leader in Wales would likely become the inaugural first secretary.

Rhodri Morgan, the Labour MP for Cardiff West, and Ron Davies, the secretary of state for Wales and Labour MP for Caerphilly, contested the 1998 Welsh Labour leadership election to become leader of the Labour Party in Wales and therefore its nominee for first secretary. Davies won the election but had to resign shortly after when he was involved in an alleged gay sex scandal in Clapham Common. Prime Minister Tony Blair appointed the Blairite Alun Michael to succeed Davies as Welsh secretary and planned for him to become the first secretary without a leadership election. This appointment was made to prevent Morgan, who had a long-held ambition to lead the assembly, from becoming Labour's leader in Wales.

== Electoral system ==
The new leader was elected using an Electoral College in which the votes of elected officials (Welsh Labour MPs, MEPs and assembly candidates), individual members and affiliates were weighted equally at a share of one-third each.

== Candidates ==
- Rhodri Morgan, Member of Parliament for Cardiff West.
- Alun Michael, Secretary of State for Wales; Member of Parliament for Cardiff South and Penarth.

A third candidate, Swansea-based businessman and lawyer, Roger Warren Evans announced his intention to run saying he would be the party's "rank and file" representative, although ultimately he didn't stand.

== Result ==
Candidate	Affiliated members (33.3%)	Individual members (33.3%)	Elected members (33.3%)	Total
Alun Michael MP	64.0%	35.7%	58.4%	52.7%
Rhodri Morgan MP	36.0%	64.3%	41.6%	47.3%
