= South Wales Police and Crime Commissioner =

Elected British official

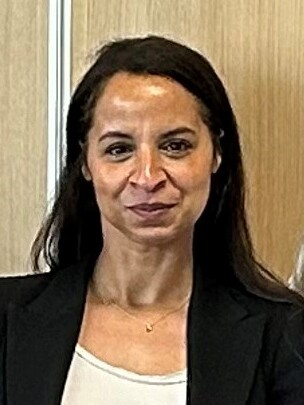
- Incumbent; Emma Wools since 9 May 2024
- Police and crime commissioner of South Wales Police
- Reports to: South Wales Police and Crime Panel
- Appointer: Electorate of Bridgend, Cardiff, Merthyr Tydfil, Neath Port Talbot, Rhondda Cynon Taf, Swansea and Vale of Glamorgan
- Term length: Four years
- Constituting instrument: Police Reform and Social Responsibility Act 2011
- Precursor: South Wales Police Authority
- Inaugural holder: Alun Michael
- Formation: 22 November 2012
- Deputy: Deputy Police and Crime Commissioner
- Salary: £88,600
- Website: www.southwalescommissioner.org.uk/en/Home.aspx

The South Wales Police and Crime Commissioner is the police and crime commissioner, an elected official tasked with setting out the way crime is tackled by South Wales Police in the "South Wales region" defined by the police force as the seven local authorities of Bridgend, Cardiff, Merthyr Tydfil, Neath Port Talbot, Rhondda Cynon Taf, Swansea and Vale of Glamorgan. The post was created in November 2012, following an election held on 15 November 2012, and replaced the South Wales Police Authority. The position is currently held by Emma Wools, representing The Labour Party.

Between 2012 and 2024, the position was held by Alun Michael, former First Secretary of the Welsh Assembly Government. In 2023, it was announced that Alun Michael would not re-contest election for the role in elections held on 2 May 2024.

== List of South Wales Police and Crime Commissioners ==
Name	Portrait	Political party	From	To
Alun Michael		Labour	22 November 2012	8 May 2024
Emma Wools		Labour	9 May 2024	Incumbent
