= Prys Morgan =

Welsh historian

Prys Morgan FRHistS FSA FLSW (born 1937) is a Welsh historian.

== Biography ==
Prys Morgan was born in Cardiff in 1937, the son of academic T. J. Morgan. His parents first met at the National Eisteddfod of Wales in 1926. Like his late brother, Rhodri Morgan, Prys Morgan was educated at Whitchurch Grammar School and St John's College, Oxford.

From 1964 he taught history at Swansea University, where his father had been a professor. He is now an Emeritus Professor of the university.

Following his retirement from academic life, he became President of the National Eisteddfod of Wales at Swansea, President of the Honourable Society of Cymmrodorion, and is joint director of the Iolo Morganwg project at the Centre for Welsh and Celtic Studies in Aberystwyth. He is also a Founding Fellow of the Learned Society of Wales and is a Member of its inaugural Council.

== Works ==
- Iolo Morganwg (1975)
- The Eighteenth Century Renaissance (1981)
- Wales – The Shaping of a Nation (1984)
- Bible for Wales – Beibl i Gymru (1988)
- Tempus Illustrated History of Wales (2000)
