= Institute of the Motor Industry =

The Institute of the Motor Industry is an international professional body for people working in the motor industry, providing retail industry information, standards and qualifications.

In 2013, IMI launched the Professional Register, listing individuals such as vehicle technicians and sales representatives in the automotive industry recognised for their experience, professionalism and commitment to ethical working practices, and for continually keeping their knowledge and skills up to date with the latest training from the industry. Professionals in the motor industry, aspire to join the Professional Register. Specifically, IMI Techsafe refers to the register devoted to those technicians who meet the professional standards for Electrified Vehicles.

On 28 October 2020, the IMI announced that it had appointed Professor Jim Saker as its new president. It also announced that Linda Jackson and Sandy Burgess were its new vice-presidents. They also confirmed Kevin Finn as chairman and Tony Tomsett as honorary treasurer.

== IMI Accreditation (Previously ATA) ==
IMI Accreditations, previously known as Automotive Technician Accreditation (ATA), is a UK Based voluntary scheme which tests the current competence of people working in the retail motor industry. Typically IMI accreditations are valid for 3 years before they must be renewed.

ATA was established in 2005 by the IMI and incorporates 16 automotive disciplines. Each route content and structure are frequently reviewed to ensure they remain relevant and current to support the skills need in the sector.

ATA was rebranded as IMI Accreditation in December 2014 as a bigger part of an IMI rebranding.
