= Alun Michael =

Welsh politician (born 1943)

The Right Honourable Alun Michael OBE JP OStJ PC FRSA
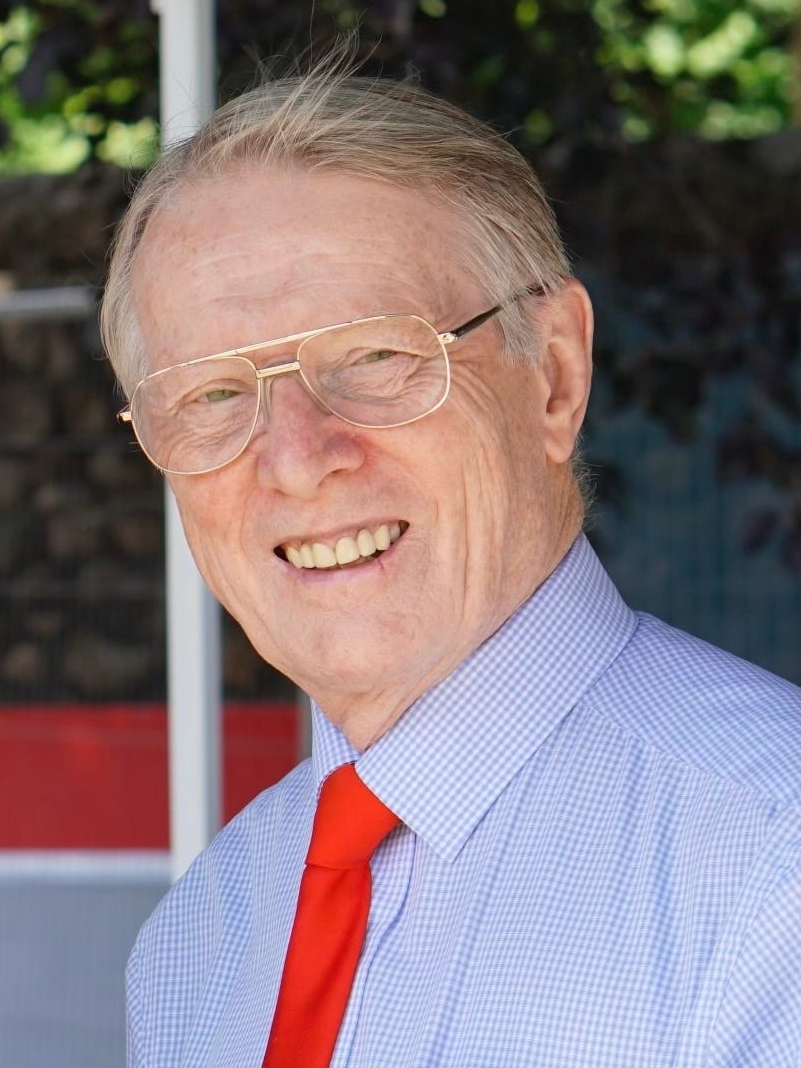
- Official portrait, 2020

South Wales Police and Crime Commissioner
- In office 22 November 2012 – 8 May 2024
- Deputy: Sophie Howe; Emma Wools
- Preceded by: Office established
- Succeeded by: Emma Wools

Minister of State for Industry and the Regions
- In office 10 May 2005 – 5 May 2006
- Prime Minister: Tony Blair
- Preceded by: Jacqui Smith
- Succeeded by: Ian McCartney

Minister of State for Rural Affairs
- In office 11 June 2001 – 10 May 2005
- Prime Minister: Tony Blair
- Preceded by: Nick Raynsford
- Succeeded by: Jim Knight

First Secretary of Wales
- In office 12 May 1999 – 9 February 2000
- Monarch: Elizabeth II
- Preceded by: Office established
- Succeeded by: Rhodri Morgan

Leader of Welsh Labour
- In office 20 February 1999 – 9 February 2000
- UK party leader: Tony Blair
- Preceded by: Ron Davies
- Succeeded by: Rhodri Morgan

Secretary of State for Wales
- In office 27 October 1998 – 28 July 1999
- Prime Minister: Tony Blair
- Preceded by: Ron Davies
- Succeeded by: Paul Murphy

Minister of State for Home Affairs and Deputy Home Secretary
- In office 6 May 1997 – 27 October 1998
- Prime Minister: Tony Blair
- Preceded by: David Maclean
- Succeeded by: Paul Boateng

Member of the Welsh Assembly for Mid and West Wales
- In office 6 May 1999 – 1 May 2000
- Preceded by: Constituency established
- Succeeded by: Delyth Evans

Member of Parliament for Cardiff South and Penarth
- In office 11 June 1987 – 22 October 2012
- Preceded by: James Callaghan
- Succeeded by: Stephen Doughty

Personal details
- Born: 22 August 1943 (age 83) Bryngwran, Anglesey, Wales
- Party: Welsh Labour (Labour and Co-operative)
- Spouse: Mary Sophia Crawley
- Children: 5
- Parent(s): Betty Michael; Leslie Michael
- Education: Keele University
- Cabinet: Michael government
- Website: Official website
- Alun Michael's voice Michael on the core values of the internet Recorded 17 November 2009

Alun Edward Michael (born 22 August 1943) is a Welsh Labour and Co-operative retired politician. He served as Secretary of State for Wales from 1998 to 1999 and then as the first First Secretary of Wales and Leader of Welsh Labour from 1999 to 2000. He went on to serve as South Wales Police and Crime Commissioner from 2012 to 2024.

Born on the island of Anglesey, Michael attended Colwyn Bay Grammar School and graduated from the University of Keele in 1966 with a degree in Philosophy and English. He worked as a reporter for the South Wales Echo until 1971 and then as a youth and community worker until 1987. He became a Justice of the Peace in 1972 and served on the Cardiff City Council from 1973 to 1989. He was elected to the House of Commons in 1987, succeeding former Labour Prime Minister James Callaghan for the constituency of Cardiff South and Penarth.

In opposition, he was a Shadow Home Affairs Minister and then when Labour came to power in 1997 he served as a Minister of State for Home Affairs until 1998. In October of that year, Ron Davies resigned as Secretary of State for Wales and Leader of Welsh Labour following the "Moment of Madness" scandal and Prime Minister Tony Blair appointed Michael to succeed him in the former role. In May 1999, following the first elections to the National Assembly for Wales, Michael defeated Rhodri Morgan to become the new Welsh Labour leader and thus the inaugural First Secretary of Wales. The position was later renamed First Minister of Wales under the tenure of his successor.

Michael resigned as Leader of Welsh Labour and First Secretary nine months later to avoid a vote of no confidence. He resigned from the Welsh Assembly shortly after and served in various junior ministerial positions in the Labour government at Westminster. He resigned from the House of Commons in October 2012 to stand for the newly created position of Police and Crime Commissioner for South Wales, to which he was elected in November 2012 and re-elected in 2016 and 2021. In June 2023 it was announced he would not contest the 2024 election; he was succeeded by his deputy Emma Wools on 8 May 2024, after her electoral victory the previous week.

== Background and family life ==
Michael was born at Bryngwran, Anglesey, the son of Leslie and Betty Michael. He attended Colwyn Bay Grammar School and studied at Keele University for four years from 1962 to 1966 obtaining a BA degree in Philosophy and English.

== Professional career ==
He was a reporter for the South Wales Echo, a Cardiff-based evening newspaper, where he was a contemporary of Michael Buerk (later to become a distinguished BBC correspondent) and of Sue Lawley (later to become presenter of the BBC magazine programme Nationwide). In his autobiography Michael Buerk wrote "Alun Michael with his ginger toothbrush-moustache and battered corduroy jacket, was a rather Pooterish character for the Sixties. He did not stay in journalism, which was no surprise, but went into politics, which certainly was". Michael in fact left journalism in 1971 and spent 16 years until 1987 as a "youth and community worker" before entering Parliament. In 1972 he was appointed a justice of the peace, chairing the Cardiff Juvenile Bench.

== Political career ==
Michael was a member of Cardiff City Council for the Rumney ward, subsequently the Trowbridge ward from 1973 until 1989.

He became an MP at the 1987 general election, inheriting a safe Labour seat from former prime minister James Callaghan. Michael retained this seat in 1992, 1997, 2001, 2005 and 2010 although with declining majorities at each election from 1997 onwards.

=== Home Office ===
Michael was a Shadow Home Affairs Minister while in opposition, prior to becoming a Minister of State in the Home Office (he likes to describe himself as having been "Deputy Home Secretary") following Labour's landslide victory in the 1997 general election. His rhetoric when coming to office differed from the eventual delivery. As Home Office minister, he pledged there would be "no hiding place for paedophiles" as there would "be cases where the public will have to be told directly that a paedophile is in their area. Several frightening cases in recent months have hammered it home that we must act." This policy was not realised, and following the case of eight-year-old Sarah Payne and calls for his original policy to be introduced, Michael agreed with the approach being taken by then Dyfed Powys Chief Constable Terence Grange, who said such a plan would drive paedophiles underground. He said "(Grange) warned of the dangers of having open access leading to paedophiles disappearing and therefore posing an even greater risk". Michael defended his decision not to introduce "Sarah's Law" saying, "These are extremely difficult issues and people are understandably very upset, but there is a danger of serious mistakes being made and this has been shown on a number occasions.".

Michael was however responsible for steering the Crime and Disorder Act 1998 through the House of Commons. Amongst other things, this Act introduced ASBOs or Anti-social Behaviour Orders and statutory crime reduction partnerships. He was also responsible for the Government policy on the voluntary and community sector, and introduced the "compact" process to achieve partnership between Government and that sector. Michael later became a member of the Justice Select Committee from November 2007 to May 2010. While on the committee he took part in enquiries into restorative justice, devolution ten years on, the role of the prison officer, and the work of the Crown Prosecution Service.

=== Wales career ===
In May 1997 Ron Davies was appointed by Tony Blair to the cabinet position of Secretary of State for Wales and then, in September 1998, narrowly defeated Rhodri Morgan in an internal contest for the Labour leadership in Wales. The first election for the National Assembly of Wales was due to be held in May 1999. Should Labour form a government, the Welsh Labour leader would then become what was to be called "First Secretary" – potentially giving Davies a role in both the UK and Welsh legislatures.

However, on 27 October 1998, Davies abruptly resigned as Secretary of State for Wales after adverse publicity about his personal life. Tony Blair overlooked Morgan (then MP for Cardiff West) and appointed Michael as the new Secretary of State for Wales.

Two days later, on 29 October 1998, Davies also resigned the Labour Leadership in Wales, thus relinquishing his ambition to become First Secretary and initiating another leadership contest. Blair again overlooked Morgan and opted to back Michael for the position. According to Neath MP Peter Hain "Rhodri was the party's favourite and feelings ran very high" but nevertheless, in a volte-face, Hain agreed to run the campaign for Michael who he described as "the establishment candidate". Although Morgan had the overwhelming support of individual Labour Party members, Michael, backed by Blair and by the trade unions, won the election. This episode led to Michael being described as a "famously tetchy Millbank-backed candidate". The affair was described by Peter Kellner as "another fix" in order "to ensure Alun Michael became Labour's leader in Wales" which Kellner said "offended so many voters that it lost some of its safest seats, including Rhondda, to Plaid Cymru". Tony Blair's favourable treatment of Michael was later described by Kellner as a "determination to foist Alun Michael on the people of Wales", which "produced a spectacular collapse of support". Michael stressed his Welsh credentials, as someone who had grown up in North Wales, lived for 30 years in South Wales and was a speaker of Welsh. He had approached Blair at a very early stage to suggest he stood for the Welsh Assembly elections.

The first Assembly election resulted in the Welsh Labour Party winning less than half of the available seats. In the first plenary on 12 May 1999 Michael was elected First Secretary.

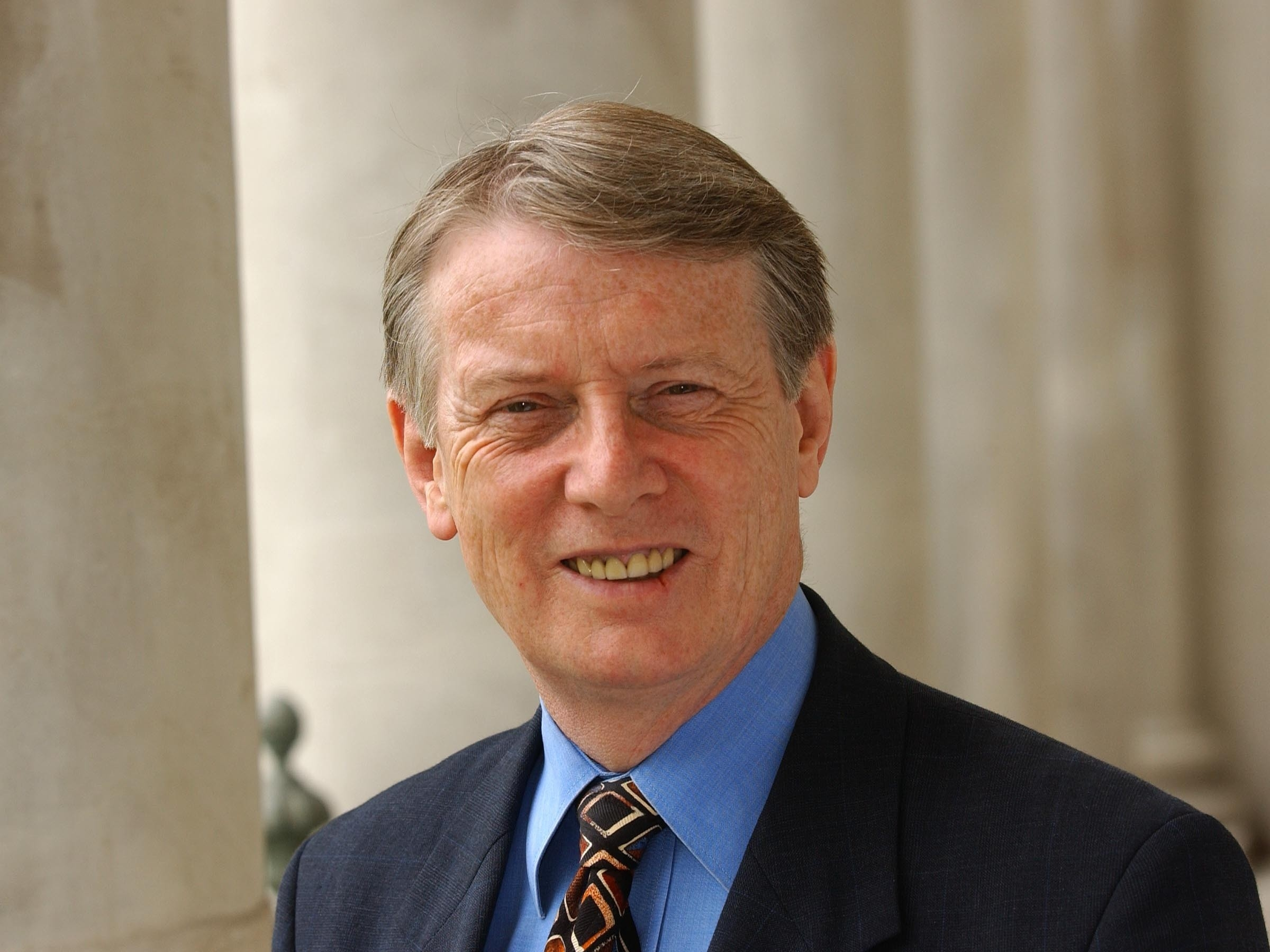
- Premiership of Alun Michael; 12 May 1999 – 9 February 2000
- Premier: Alun Michael
- Cabinet: Michael government
- Party: Welsh Labour
- Election: 1999
- Appointed by: Elizabeth II
- Seat: Tŷ Hywel

Rather than form a coalition, Michael took the unconventional route of forming a minority government, believing that this offered the potential for a more collaborative and democratic approach to the work of the Assembly.

However, this was to lead to the very outcome Tony Blair had wanted to prevent, the election of Rhodri Morgan as leader of the Welsh Assembly. On 9 February 2000, after less than nine months in office, Michael resigned in an attempt to avoid a vote of "no confidence" over the availability of Objective 1 funding from the European Union. Blair was in the House of Commons taking Prime Minister's Questions when Michael resigned; his parliamentary private secretary had not been notified of this yet, and moments later Conservative leader William Hague asked: "Will the Prime Minister comment on the fact that within moments of his expressing full confidence in the First Secretary in Wales five or 10 minutes ago, news came through to the House that the First Secretary had resigned, before the vote of confidence had taken place?"

Michael sat on the Welsh Affairs Select Committee from November 2007 to May 2010 and resigned as an MP on 22 October 2012.

=== Environment career ===
In 2001, he was appointed Minister of State for Rural Affairs and Local Environmental Quality, a post within DEFRA. He was the minister most closely connected with a ban on hunting with dogs, for which he attracted much criticism from hunt supporters. Michael was criticised for citing the research of Sir Patrick Bateson as "incontrovertible proof" of the need for a total ban. Sir Patrick said, "Only somebody who was scientifically illiterate could argue that evidence from a new area of research was 'incontrovertible'" but Michael claimed that Bateson had misunderstood the way his work had been cited.

==== Hunting Act ====
In 2004, he presided over the enactment of the Hunting Act which banned hare coursing, beagling, fox hunting, mink and stag hunting in the UK from February 2005. At the time this law was being debated, and immediately after it was passed, Michael maintained his visits to rural areas despite threats and protest, but withdrew from the event to launch the "Right to Roam" stating that access to the countryside was too important to be interrupted by pro-hunt protestors whose plans could put the public at risk. Michael maintained that hunting was a "peripheral issue" citing social and economic issues in rural areas as "the day job". In 2004, he formally approved the order designating the New Forest as a National Park.

==== Trade and Business ====
In 2005 Michael was moved to a ministerial post in the Department of Trade and Industry as Minister of State for Industry and the Regions, where he served only one year before he was returned to the backbenches in the Cabinet reshuffle of May 2006.

In 2005 the Freedom of Information Act came into force allowing members of the public to request disclosure of information from public bodies. On 18 May 2007 Alun Michael was among the majority of MPs who voted in favour of exempting MPs from having to disclose information under the act.

=== Votes for 14-year-olds ===
In his newspaper column in the Penarth Times of 10 May 2010, Michael proposed giving the vote to 14-year-olds as a way of improving turn-out at UK elections. He said: "My first suggestion is to reduce the voting age to 14 – an age which I find young people far better informed and sensibly engaged than was the case in the past – so that everybody takes place in the voting process once before leaving full-time education. They will then know how to vote when they come to engage with political issues later in life". This was going much further than official Labour Party policy, which only promised a free vote in Parliament on reducing the voting age to 16 in their 2010 manifesto.

== Controversies ==
=== Parliamentary expenses claims ===
Michael was one of the MPs who was investigated by The Daily Telegraph in its probe into MPs Expenses Claims in 2009. The Telegraph reported that "Alun Michael claims £4,800 for food in one year, and £2,600 for repairs to his roof at his constituency home in Penarth. Claims for £1,250 cost of repairing a wall and building a 13ft chain link fence." Subsequently, it was reported he was among 390 MPs required by Sir Thomas Legg to repay taxpayers' money which allegedly they had wrongly-claimed. An audit of claims dating back to 2004 revealed that Michael should repay £18,889.56 for mortgage interest on additional loans "not shown to have been for an eligible purpose". He had also been paid £280 more than he was entitled to claim for council tax in the year 2004/05 – claiming expenses for 12 installments when he had only had to pay 10 to the local authority. Michael blamed a "clerical error" for the inflated claim. He said "The council tax payment came at a time when I was under a lot of stress politically". Michael repaid £19,169.56 although later in a 2010 Election Hustings meeting in Splott he said press reports of his having been forced to pay back £20,000 were "untrue" and asserted he had "voluntarily" paid back the money.

=== Investigated by IPSA ===
In 2011, Michael was investigated by the Independent Parliamentary Standards Authority (IPSA) over his website. IPSA found he had contravened the rules of the MPs' Expenses Scheme which prohibit MPs from claiming parliamentary expenses for websites which include party logos. Michael had claimed – and been paid – £346.71 which he was not entitled to. He was given 20 days to amend his website but was not required to pay back the money he had been paid.

== Police and Crime Commissioner ==
Michael answers questions in a video for the Welsh Government in February 2019

On 18 June 2012, Michael was chosen as the Labour Party candidate for the inaugural election for Police and Crime Commissioner for South Wales.

On 13 July 2012 the Western Mail reported that Michael had been "interfering inappropriately" in the selection process for his replacement in Cardiff South and Penarth, to ensure his preferred candidate (Stephen Doughty) was included on the shortlist. Michael responded that he did speak to Ed Miliband, to the party's general secretary Iain McNicol and members of the National Executive Committee, with the purpose to stop a candidate from outside being imposed on the local party.

Having stood down as an MP, Michael was declared the winner of the first-ever election for Police and Crime Commissioner for South Wales on 16 November 2012 (the election having taken place the previous day). The PCC elections used the supplementary vote system. In the first round Michael failed to gain an outright majority against two Independents and a Conservative candidate. In the second-round however Michael garnered 72,751 votes beating the runner-up, Independent candidate and former lawyer Michael Barker, by 11,967 votes.

In a Parliamentary written answer on 11 December 2012, Damian Green, Minister of State for Police and Criminal Justice, reported that Michael's salary as PCC for South Wales is £85,000 per annum.

On 9 November 2017 Michael asked Carwyn Jones to define the allegations made against Carl Sargeant, the former Welsh assembly member who apparently took his own life.

On 23 May 2023, and in reference to the deaths of two boys in a collision in Cardiff, Michael said "It would appear that there were rumours, and those rumours became rife, of a police chase, which wasn't the case and I think it illustrates the speed with which rumours can run around with the activity that goes on social media nowadays, and that events can get out of hand." Later the same day this was apparently contradicted by the emergence of household CCTV footage of a police van closely following two people on an electric bike 900 metres from the crash site. In response, Jane Dodds, the leader of the Welsh Liberal Democrats, said, "This footage raises serious questions over the version of events provided by South Wales Police and PCC Alun Michael. We now need an immediate, impartial investigation. Should Alun Michael be found to have misled the public he should resign."

In 2023, it was announced that Michael would not contest the 2024 South Wales Police and Crime Commissioner elections. His former deputy, Emma Wools was elected following his retirement in 2024.

== Since his retirement ==
After his retirement, Michael was appointed as a voluntary ambassador for the charity Action for Children on 6 November 2024. In March 2025, he became president of the Council for Wales of Voluntary Youth Services.

== Awards ==
- In 1972, Michael was made a Justice of the Peace.
- In 2016, he was made an Officer of the Order of St John.
- In the 2025 New Year Honours, Michael was made an Officer of the Order of the British Empire for services to public safety.
- Michael is also a Fellow of the Royal Society of Arts.

== Bibliography ==
- Dragon on Our Doorstep: New Politics for a New Millennium in Wales by Alun Michael (University of Wales, Aberystwyth, 2000) ISBN 0-9537829-0-5
- Labour in Action: Tough on Crime, Tough on the Causes of Crime – a Collection of Essays edited by Alun Michael (Fabian Society, 1997) ISBN 0-7163-3033-4
- Building the Future Together (Labour Party, 1997)

== See also ==
- List of Welsh AMs/MSs with the shortest service

Parliament of the United Kingdom
Preceded by James Callaghan	Member of Parliament for Cardiff South and Penarth; 1987–2012	Succeeded by Stephen Doughty
Political offices
Preceded by Ron Davies	Secretary of State for Wales; 1998–1999	Succeeded by Paul Murphy
New office	First Secretary for Wales; 1999–2000	Succeeded by Rhodri Morgan
Party political offices
New office	Leader of Welsh Labour; 1999–2000	Succeeded by Rhodri Morgan
Senedd
New constituency	Assembly Member for Mid and West Wales; 1999–2000	Succeeded by Delyth Evans
