= Welsh Labour =

UK Labour Party branch in Wales

Welsh Labour Llafur Cymru
- Leader: Ken Skates
- Deputy Leader: Carolyn Harris
- General Secretary: Joe Lock
- Founded: 1947
- Headquarters: 1 Cathedral Road; Cardiff; CF11 9HA
- Student wing: Welsh Labour Students
- Youth wing: Welsh Young Labour
- Membership (2023): 18,000
- Ideology: Social democracy; British unionism
- Political position: Centre-left
- European affiliation: Party of European Socialists
- International affiliation: Progressive Alliance; Socialist International (observer)
- UK Parliament affiliation: Labour Party (UK)
- Affiliate party: Co-operative Party (Labour and Co-operative Party)
- Colours: Red
- Slogan: Wales' Future
- House of Commons: 27 / 32 (Welsh seats)
- Senedd: 9 / 96
- Councillors in Wales: 471 / 1,234
- Councils led in Wales: 12 / 22
- Police and crime commissioners: 3 / 4

Election symbol

Website
- www.welshlabour.wales

Welsh Labour (Welsh: Llafur Cymru), formerly known as the Labour Party in Wales (Welsh: Y Blaid Lafur yng Nghymru), is an autonomous section of the United Kingdom Labour Party in Wales. Welsh Labour and its forebears won a plurality of the Welsh vote at every United Kingdom general election from 1922, every National Assembly (now Senedd) election from 1999 to 2021, and all elections to the European Parliament in the period 1979–2004 and in 2014. Welsh Labour holds 27 of the 32 Welsh seats in the House of Commons of the United Kingdom, 9 of the 96 seats in the Welsh Senedd, and 576 of the 1,264 councillors in principal local authorities including overall control of 10 of the 22 principal local authorities.

From 1922 to 2026, it had the longest winning streak of any political party in the world and had been described as "by some distance the democratic world's most successful election-winning machine". Its winning-streak ended in 2026, with the party receiving 9 out of 96 seats in the 7th Senedd.

== History ==
=== Origins (1890s to 1945) ===
By the end of the 19th century, most of Wales' adult male population were able to vote. They predominantly supported the Liberal Party partially due to the influence of the Nonconformist religious movement on Welsh society as well as the party's association with various other radical causes, including improving the welfare of the working classes.

In 1893, the Independent Labour party was founded; it established branches in Wales, but did not initially gain mass appeal. In 1900, the Labour Representation Committee was founded by socialist societies and trade unions, the organisation from which the Labour Party would evolve. Keir Hardie, the first leader of the Independent Labour Party, was elected as member for Merthyr Tydfil in 1900. When the National Union of Mineworkers affiliated to the party in 1908, their four sponsored Welsh MPs became Labour MPs. Over the next few years, there was a steady rise in the number of Labour councillors and MPs in Wales. Particularly after the First World War, an expanded electorate and the damage the conflict caused to the Liberals reputation contributed to a major shift in support towards Labour in industrial areas. In the 1922 general election, Labour won half the Welsh parliamentary seats.

After 1922, Labour maintained consistent electoral dominance in Wales, winning between 40% and 45% at general elections for the rest of the interwar period. In 1931, when the Labour party collapsed to just 52 seats, the 16 seats it won in the southern Welsh valleys constituted its largest regional stronghold anywhere in Britain. After difficult years in the 1920s and '30s, following World War II there was keen desire in Wales like elsewhere in the UK to avoid a return to the conditions of the interwar era, and the Labour victory at the 1945 general election was strongly endorsed by the Welsh electorate.

=== As an all Wales unit (from 1947) ===
In 1947, an all Wales unit was formed within the Labour Party for the first time with the merger of South Wales Regional Council of Labour and the constituency parties of north and mid Wales. This change was based on the Labour Party's support for central planning in the Welsh economy and was not at that stage any kind of endorsement of the idea of devolution.

Labour expanded its dominance of Welsh politics in the early 1950s, extending its influence in rural and Welsh speaking areas beyond its traditional industrial heartlands. Though Labour went into opposition after 1951, the Labour Party in Wales polled over 50 per cent of the popular vote at each general election, winning seemingly impregnable majorities in the valleys of south Wales. Aneurin Bevan, for example, was routinely returned for Ebbw Vale with 80 per cent of the vote. The pattern was similar in some 15 other seats in the region. Through its actions in local government and proposals for central government the Labour Party in Wales was perceived to be a modernising party committed to investing in infrastructure and serious about providing jobs and improving public services.

In the 1964 general election, the Labour Party in Wales polled some 58% of the Welsh vote and won 28 of the 36 seats. The Wilson government gave the Labour Party in Wales the chance to enact its promise (following the Conservative government's appointment of a Minister of Welsh Affairs in the mid-1950s) to create the post of Secretary of State for Wales and a Welsh Office. At the 1966 United Kingdom general election, Labour's support in Wales reached a peak, winning 61% of the vote and all but four of Wales's 36 parliamentary constituencies.

=== Increased competition (from 1967) ===
Within three months, however, Gwynfor Evans sensationally captured Carmarthen for Plaid Cymru at a by-election and they came close to victory at the 1967 Rhondda West and 1968 Caerphilly by-elections, achieving swings against Labour of 30 and 40 per cent respectively.

The emergence of Plaid Cymru (and the Scottish National Party) prompted the Wilson government to establish the Kilbrandon Commission, causing the Labour Party in Wales to consider once more the case for devolution – this time in its favour. Labour victory in the February 1974 general election pushed devolution onto the political agenda, culminating in a decisive vote against a Welsh Assembly in a 1979 referendum.

Plaid Cymru's threat in the industrial heartland fell away in the 1970s, but it and the Conservatives gained ground in Welsh-speaking and coastal Wales respectively, where Labour's roots were shallower. By the 1979 general election, the Labour Party in Wales held 22 of the 36 parliamentary seats, albeit with a 48 per cent share of the vote.

This relative decline was eclipsed by a dramatic fall in Labour support at the 1983 General Election. In contrast to the 1950s, the swing against Labour in Britain was matched in Wales, where voters showed themselves just as unwilling to endorse Michael Foot's markedly more left-wing manifesto. The Labour Party in Wales polled a mere 37.5 per cent of the popular vote, yielding 20 seats. A rampant Conservative Party, by contrast, captured 14 seats (including three of the four Cardiff constituencies) and exceeded 30 per cent of the vote for the second election in succession. The Labour Party in Wales's problems were compounded by a strong SDP–Liberal Alliance performance, gaining 23 per cent of the vote, though few seats, at what was to be the height of its success.

The miners' strike of 1984–1985 appeared to offer the Labour Party in Wales an electoral opportunity, despite the invidious position in which it placed the new Labour leader, Neil Kinnock. At the 1987 General Election the Welsh party polled 45 per cent, winning 24 seats and winning another two from the Conservatives at by-elections in 1989 and 1991.

However, Conservative policy in Wales could be said to have helped to break the traditional compact between the Labour Party in Wales and the Welsh electorate. The party was ineffective when faced with the psychological trauma of restructuring and de-industrialising the Welsh economy. Meanwhile, the seemingly perpetual Conservative rule, based on its electoral power outside Wales, reignited debate within the Labour Party in Wales on devolution.

Under John Smith, Labour committed itself to devolution for Wales and Scotland, a commitment that survived his early death. By 1997, the Labour Party in Wales captured 34 of Wales's 40 seats, wiping out the Conservatives' Welsh representation and polling 55 per cent. The stage was set for another devolution referendum, this time won by the narrowest of margins.

=== Devolution era (from 1999) ===
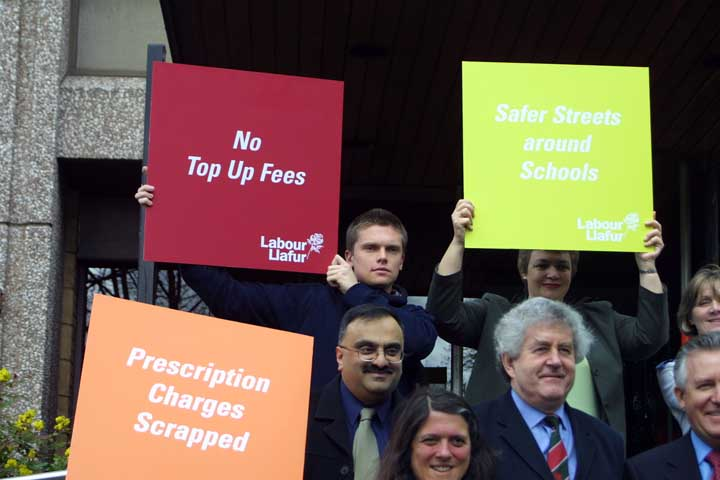
Rhodri Morgan campaigning in 2003 against the introduction of top-up fees for university students – a Labour policy at Westminster

In 1998, the leader of the Labour Party in Wales Ron Davies, resigned. In 1999, Wales voted in its first Assembly members; Plaid Cymru achieve 28% of the vote but Labour won with 38% and governed as a minority government. In February 2000, the first assembly leader, Alun Michael resigned following a vote of no confidence on the matter of European funding for Wales. The new leader, Rhodri Morgan, rebranded the Labour Party in Wales as Welsh Labour, and in October that year, Welsh Labour and the Liberal Democrats formed a coalition lasting three years. In April 2001 the Welsh government announced free entry for museums and galleries (8 months after a similar announcement in England).

==== Clear Red Water ====
In December 2002 Rhodri Morgan gave a speech to the National Centre for Public Policy Swansea which although he forgot to say it in the speech, was branded as the "Clear Red Water" speech. The policy was ment to distinguish Welsh Labour away from UK Labour, and that Welsh Labour would pursue more left wing, socialist policies, compared with New Labour's more centrist policies. This approach has been argued to have preserved Welsh Labour electorally compared to Scottish Labour who lost control to the SNP since 2007.

In 2002, free bus passes were introduced in Wales, differently to England. Welsh Labour achieve 40% the Assembly election vote in 2003. In 2004, the Richard Commission suggested increasing the legislative powers of the Assembly. In 2006, the Government of Wales Act 2006 granted the Assembly new powers. The assembly formed the Welsh Assembly government, which is separate from the legislature. In 2007, Welsh Labour introduced free prescriptions in Wales.

In the 2007 elections, Welsh Labour's share of the vote fell to 32.2 per cent, its second lowest since the UK general election of 1923. Its seat number fell by four to 26: 11 more than the second largest party, Plaid Cymru. On 25 May Rhodri Morgan was again nominated as First Minister. On 27 June, Morgan concluded the One Wales agreement with Plaid Cymru, which was approved by Labour rank and file on 6 July. On 1 December 2009, Carwyn Jones became the new leader of Welsh Labour.

In March 2010, Welsh Labour twice refused to cross the PCS union picket line, leading to strong criticism for not doing so from the Welsh Conservatives and the Welsh Liberal Democrats. Carwyn Jones argued that this refusal was ingrained in Labour's thinking At the 2010 UK general election which ended Labour's long period of government across the UK, Labour also lost seats and vote share in Wales mainly to the conservatives. At the end of the One Wales agreement in 2011, Labour gained seats in the Welsh assembly at the expense of their Non-Conservative opponents. At the 2015 UK general election, Labour saw a slight uptick in vote share and made a net gain of one seat in Wales.

On 6 May 2016, Welsh Labour won 29 of the 60 seats in the Assembly elections and secured a fifth term in government, in a minority coalition with the sole remaining Welsh Lib Dem member, Kirsty Williams. In 2017 cabinet was reshuffled with Dafydd Elis-Thomas joining it. Plaid Cymru also participated in an alliance with the party from 2016 to 2017. Welsh Labour supported remain at the 2016 EU membership referendum, though most Welsh voters in that referendum ultimately chose leave. Labour won a plurality of votes and majority of seats in Wales at the 2017 and 2019 UK general elections, with the overall trend of the party's fortunes broadly mirroring its results across Britain; gaining seats and vote share in 2017 and losing both in 2019.

Following Carwyn Jones' retirement as leader in 2018, Mark Drakeford, the main architect of the 'clear red water' policy became leader. He pursued further Welsh devolution and divergence from the UK Labour policies (although they were more similar under Jeremy Corbyn's leadership). During the COVID-19 pandemic, since healthcare is devolved Drakeford pursed many policies that diverged from the UK government, this also elevated the publicity of the Senedd and Drakeford which was responsible for Covid-19 response policies in Wales.

I think it is [...] really important and fascinating that after 22 years the Welsh Labour Party is still going to be an essential component of the next Welsh Government. London has become a Labour heartland, Scotland is very much not a Labour heartland, seats that had reliably voted Labour up until 2010 have massively trended towards the Conservatives and yet the Welsh Labour party; the dude abides...

— Political reporter Stephen Bush discusses the long running success of Welsh Labour shortly before the 2021 Senedd election on the New Statesman podcast, Known Unknowns

In the 2021 Senedd election, Welsh Labour's share of the vote rose by about 5 per cent and the party won half the seats in the Senedd, equalling its best-ever result in 2003. A few months later the party formed an agreement with Plaid Cymru over a wide range of policy including included free-at-the-point-of-use social care, expanding services for children and restrictions on second homes. The deal was the third time the two parties had agreed to work together in the era of devolution.

==== Abandonment of 'Clear Red Water' ====
Following Mark Drakeford's term as leader in 2024, Vaughan Gething became leader. His policies largely abandoned the stratagy of clear red water, in favour of a closer relationship with UK Labour. Eluned Morgan, a historic critic of the policy, became leader later in 2024, and in 2025 following collapse of Labour's popularity in polling, she adpoted a new "Red Welsh Way" strategy.

The party's 104-year winning streak ended at the 2026 Senedd election, which saw Welsh Labour reduced to 9 of 96 seats with only 11.1% of the vote, falling behind Plaid Cymru and Reform UK Wales. Eluned Morgan, lost her seat in the Ceredigion Penfro constituency. Following the election, Ken Skates became leader of the party in the Senedd.

== Structure ==
Welsh Labour is formally part of the Labour Party, not separately registered with the Electoral Commission under the terms of the Political Parties, Elections and Referendums Act. In 2016, the Labour Party Conference voted to institute the office of leader of Welsh Labour, a position currently held by Ken Skates. Welsh Labour has autonomy in policy formulation for the areas now devolved to the Senedd and in candidate selection for it. Party objectives are set by the Welsh Executive Committee (WEC), which plays a similar function to the Labour Party's National Executive Committee (NEC) in devolved responsibilities. Welsh Labour also has its own parliamentary group within the Parliamentary Labour Party (PLP) in the House of Commons, where it also has its own whip. Since 2016, Welsh Labour's whip in the PLP has been Jessica Morden MP.

The Welsh Executive Committee contains representatives of each section of the party – MPs, MSs, councillors, trade unions and Constituency Labour Parties (CLPs – the basic unit of organisation throughout the Labour Party). All Wales's 32 CLPs are registered as accounting units with the Electoral Commission.

Welsh Labour headquarters in Cardiff organises the party's election campaigns at all levels of government Community Councils, Unitary Authorities, the Senedd and Westminster, supports the CLPs and branches in membership matters and performs secretarial functions for the Senedd Labour Party (SLP) and the party's policy-making process. It also organises the annual conference – the sovereign decision-making body of the party in Wales – provides legal and constitutional advice and arbitrate on certain disciplinary matters.

== Election results ==
In recent years, there has been some decline for Labour in Wales. The 2009 European Parliament election saw the party fail to come first in an election in Wales for the first time since 1918 (finishing second behind the Conservatives) and in the 2010 general election Labour had its worst general election result in Wales in its history. If the swing in Wales were repeated across the UK, the Conservatives would have won a landslide victory of over 100 seats; in some, such as Pontypridd, Welsh Labour lost over 16 per cent of its vote. In the 2011 Welsh Assembly elections, Labour regained half the seats in the National Assembly. In the 2014 European Parliament election, Labour topped the poll in Wales with a swing of 7.9 percentage points. The 2015 general election saw Labour achieve its second lowest vote share in Wales during the post-World War II era.

In the 2017 general election, the decline in parliamentary elections was reversed – Labour raised its vote share to 48.9 per cent, its highest in a general election in Wales since 1997, winning 28 of the 40 Welsh seats in Westminster. However, the 2019 general election saw the party again achieve a fairly poor result by historic standards. Contrastingly, the 2021 Senedd election saw the party match its best ever result at a devolved election and almost its best ever vote share.

In the 2024 general election in Wales, Labour won 27 seats.

=== House of Commons ===
Election	Wales		+/–
Election	%	Seats	+/–
1945	58.5	25 / 35	
1950	58.1	27 / 36	▲2
1951	60.5	27 / 36	Steady
1955	57.6	27 / 36	Steady
1959	56.4	27 / 36	Steady
1964	57.8	28 / 36	▲1
1966	60.7	32 / 36	▲4
1970	51.6	27 / 36	▼5
Feb 1974	46.8	24 / 36	▼3
Oct 1974	49.5	23 / 36	▼1
1979 (Note: Includes the Speaker)	48.6	22 / 36	▼1
1983	37.5	20 / 38	▼2
1987	45.1	24 / 38	▲4
1992	49.5	27 / 38	▲3
1997	54.8	34 / 40	▲7
2001	48.6	34 / 40	Steady
2005	42.7	29 / 40	▼5
2010	36.3	26 / 40	▼3
2015	37.1	25 / 40	▼1
2017	48.9	28 / 40	▲3
2019	40.9	22 / 40	▼6
2024	37.0	27 / 32	▲5

=== Senedd ===
Election	Constituency			Regional			Votes	%	Total seats	+/–	Government
Election	Votes	%	Seats	Votes	%	Seats	Votes	%	Total seats	+/–	Government
1999	384,671	37.6	27 / 40	361,657	35.5	1 / 20			28 / 60		Lab–LD
2003	340,515	40.0	30 / 40	310,658	36.6	0 / 20			30 / 60	▲2	Minority
2007	314,925	32.2	24 / 40	288,954	29.7	2 / 20			26 / 60	▼4	Lab–Plaid
2011	401,677	42.3	28 / 40	349,935	36.9	2 / 20			30 / 60	▲4	Minority
2016	353,866	34.7	27 / 40	319,196	31.5	2 / 20			29 / 60	▼1	Lab–LD–Ind
2021	443,047	39.9	27 / 40	401,770	36.2	3 / 20			30 / 60	▲1	Minority
2026 (Note: Starting with the 2026 election, the Senedd was increased to 96 members who are all elected through closed list proportional representation (using the D'Hondt method) in sixteen six-member constituencies)							139,203	11.1	9 / 96	▼21	Opposition

=== European Parliament ===
Election	Wales		+/–
Election	%	Seats	+/–
1979	41.5	3 / 4	
1984	44.5	3 / 4	Steady
1989	48.9	4 / 4	▲1
1994	55.9	5 / 5	▲1
1999	31.8	2 / 5	▼3
2004	32.5	2 / 4	Steady
2009	20.3	1 / 4	▼1
2014	28.1	1 / 4	Steady
2019	15.3	1 / 4	Steady

=== Councils ===
Year	Votes	Share of votes	Seats won
1995	404,013	43.6%	726 / 1,272
1999	338,470	34.4%	563 / 1,270
2004	278,193	30.6%	479 / 1,263
2008	253,029	26.6%	345 / 1,270
2012 (Note: Excludes the results of the delayed 2013 Isle of Anglesey County Council election)	304,466	35.6%	577 / 1,235
2017	294,989	30.4%	468 / 1,271
2022	323,075	34%	526 / 1,271

== Appointments ==
=== House of Lords ===
There are currently 17 Labour Members in the House of Lords from Wales.

No.	Name	Date Ennobled
1.	Lord Anderson of Swansea	2005
2.	Baroness Gale of Blaenrhondda	1999
3.	Lord Griffiths of Burry Port	2004
4.	Lord Kinnock of Bedwellty	2005
5.	Lord Jones of Deeside	2001
6.	Lord Hain of Neath	2015
7.	Lord Howarth of Newport	2005
8.	Baroness Jones of Whitchurch	2006
9.	Lord Morgan of Aberdyfi	2000
10.	Lord Murphy of Torfaen	2015
11.	Lord Rowlands	2004
12.	Lord Touhig	2010
13.	Baroness Wilcox of Newport	2019
14.	Lord Hanson of Flint	2024
15.	Lord Jones of Penybont	2025
16.	Baroness Morgan of Ely	2011
17.	Lord Brennan of Canton	2025

== Elected leaders ==
Leader		From	To
1	Ron Davies	19 September 1998	29 October 1998
2	Alun Michael	20 February 1999	9 February 2000
Rhodri Morgan was interim leader during this period
3	Rhodri Morgan	11 February 2000	1 December 2009
4	Carwyn Jones	1 December 2009	6 December 2018
5	Mark Drakeford	6 December 2018	16 March 2024
6	Vaughan Gething	16 March 2024	24 July 2024
7	Eluned Morgan	24 July 2024	8 May 2026
Ken Skates was interim leader during this period
8	Ken Skates	15 July 2026	Incumbent

== Elected deputy leaders ==
No.	Image	Name	Term start	Term end
1		Carolyn Harris	21 April 2018	Incumbent

== General secretaries ==
1947: Cliff Prothero
1965: Emrys Jones
1979: Hubert Morgan
1984: Anita Gale
1999: Jessica Morden
2005: Chris Roberts
2010: David Hagendyk
2017: Louise Magee
2022: Jo McIntyre:
2024: Joe Lock

== See also ==
- Clear red water
