= Welsh Automotive Forum =

Company logo

The Welsh Automotive Forum, also known as WAF, is a limited company that lobbies the government on behalf of the automotive industry in Wales. It was formed in 1999.

The board of directors is chaired by Mike Evans, and Robert O'Neil is the Chief Executive.

WAF is part funded by the Welsh Government.
