= Ron Davies (Welsh politician) =

Welsh politician (born 1946)

The Right Honourable Ron Davies
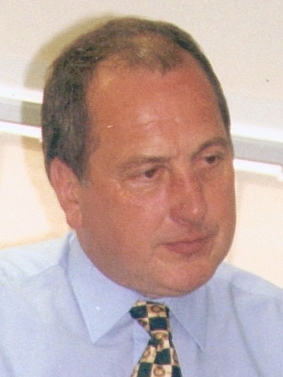
- Davies in 1998

Leader of Welsh Labour
- In office 19 September 1998 – 29 October 1998
- UK party leader: Tony Blair
- Preceded by: Position established
- Succeeded by: Alun Michael

Secretary of State for Wales
- In office 2 May 1997 – 27 October 1998
- Prime Minister: Tony Blair
- Preceded by: William Hague
- Succeeded by: Alun Michael

Shadow Secretary of State for Wales
- In office 5 November 1992 – 2 May 1997
- Leader: John Smith; Margaret Beckett; Tony Blair
- Preceded by: Ann Clwyd
- Succeeded by: William Hague

Member of the Welsh Assembly for Caerphilly
- In office 6 May 1999 – 1 May 2003
- Preceded by: Constituency established
- Succeeded by: Jeffrey Cuthbert

Member of Parliament for Caerphilly
- In office 9 June 1983 – 14 May 2001
- Preceded by: Ednyfed Hudson Davies
- Succeeded by: Wayne David

Personal details
- Born: 6 August 1946 (age 80) Machen, Monmouthshire (historic), Wales
- Party: Labour (until 2004); Forward Wales (2004–2009); Independent (2009–2010); Plaid Cymru (2010–present)
- Spouse: Christina Rees (div. 1999) Lynn Hughes (m. 2002)
- Education: University of Portsmouth; Cardiff University

Ronald Davies (born 6 August 1946) is a retired Welsh politician, former Secretary of State for Wales, former Member of Parliament and former member of the Welsh Assembly. He describes himself as a politician belonging to the "traditional left" who had "spent his life looking for a socialist progressive party". He was a member of the Labour Party (until 2004), and then of Forward Wales (2004–2009); he was subsequently an independent candidate and eventually joined Plaid Cymru in 2010.

Davies is credited with being the "architect of devolution" in Wales and led the campaign to create the National Assembly for Wales. He became the first Cabinet Minister to resign from Tony Blair's Cabinet in 1998, following what became known as a "moment of madness" when he was mugged at knifepoint after agreeing to go for a meal with a man he had met at Clapham Common.

== Early and personal life ==
Born in Machen in the Rhymney Valley in Monmouthshire, he was educated in Bassaleg Grammar School before graduating in Geography at Portsmouth Polytechnic.

Davies was first elected as a Councillor in 1969 to the former Machen Urban District Council at the age of 23. A year later he became the youngest council leader in Britain at the age of 24. After local government re-organisation in 1974, he continued as a leader of the newly constituted Rhymney Valley District Council and led a campaign for a Fair Rents Act against plans by the Conservative Government of Edward Heath to increase the amount of rent paid by council house tenants. However, in Labour circles it was well known that he wanted to surrender to the government, but was voted down by the local party management, led by Ray Davies.

After training to be a teacher at Cardiff University he spent two years as a school teacher before becoming a Tutor-Organiser for the Workers' Educational Association, succeeding Neil Kinnock in 1970 when the future Labour leader was elected to Parliament. He went on Further to become Education Adviser for the Mid-Glamorgan Education Authority from 1974 until 1983, when he was elected to Parliament as the Labour MP for Caerphilly.

Davies was married to fellow Welsh MP Christina Rees; the couple divorced in 1999 and have one daughter, Angharad. He subsequently married his third wife, Lynne Hughes, they met on a Welsh-language course, marrying at a register office in Caerphilly on 5 August 2002.

== Political career ==
=== Parliament ===
After two years as a backbench MP, Davies was appointed an Opposition Whip in 1985, where his subject areas included agriculture and the environment. In 1987 he was appointed to the opposition frontbench as a spokesman on Agriculture and Rural Affairs responsible for reviewing the Labour Party's policies on animal welfare.

He was appointed Chief Opposition spokesman for agriculture in July 1992 and did much to highlight the growing threat from BSE. In November 1992 he was appointed Shadow Secretary of State for Wales by John Smith.

As the Labour Party's chief spokesman for Wales from 1992 to 1997, Davies developed the party's devolution policy. He negotiated support for a sixty-member Welsh Assembly to take over the functions of the Secretary of State for Wales and elected by an element of proportionality. His personal preference for a body with stronger powers was defeated internally.

In May 1997 Davies was appointed by Tony Blair to the Privy Council and the Cabinet as Secretary of State for Wales. One of his first acts was to return the £150,000 to the Aberfan disaster fund that a previous Labour Government had taken to restore the site of the landslide that had devastated the valley's community in 1966, although controversially this was without interest being paid. As over thirty years had passed, the money was worth a fraction of its original value.

In July 1997, he published the Government's detailed devolution proposals in the White paper "A Voice for Wales" and led the Labour Party's successful campaign for a 'yes' vote in the devolution referendum on 18 September 1997. Though Labour reversed a 4 to 1 majority against devolution recorded in the 1979 referendum, the slender majority of 0.6% on a 50.1% turnout, cast a shadow over the institution's authority.

He steered the Government of Wales Bill through Parliament, and on 31 July 1998, he saw the Government of Wales Act reach the statute book, putting in place the legislation to set up the first ever National Assembly for Wales.

He has been credited with being "the architect of devolution", and was appointed to the highest order of the Gorsedd of the Bards at the 1998 National Eisteddfod in Bridgend, earning the bardic name "Ron o Fachen" (Ron from Machen)

=== "Moment of madness" and resignation ===
On 19 September 1998, Davies defeated Rhodri Morgan to become Labour's candidate for First Secretary of the Assembly at a special Welsh Labour Party conference in Newport. Just over a month later, he was embroiled in a scandal after being mugged at knifepoint on Clapham Common in London, a well-known gay meeting place. He was mugged after agreeing to go for what he said was a meal with a man he had met while walking on the common. He resigned as the Secretary of State for Wales on 27 October 1998, and stood down as candidate for First Secretary two days later. The full details of the incident (which he described as a "moment of madness" at the urging of Tony Blair's Press secretary Alastair Campbell) have never emerged. He later acknowledged that he was bisexual, and was receiving treatment for a personality disorder which led him to seek out risky situations. He stood down from Parliament at the 2001 general election.

=== National Assembly for Wales ===
On 30 January 1999, Davies was selected as a Labour candidate for the first elections to the National Assembly for Wales. He was elected on 6 May 1999 as Assembly Member for the Caerphilly constituency, and initially chaired the Economic Development Committee after Alun Michael refused to appoint him to his Cabinet. Further revelations and disagreements with the Labour leadership resulted in his resignation from the chairmanship of the committee.

He is known for the phrase "Devolution is a process and not an event", by which he meant that the settlement he introduced in 1997 would not be the final one, and more powers would accrue to the Welsh Assembly over time. He wrote a pamphlet for the think tank the Institute of Welsh Affairs with the same title in 1998.

Shortly before the 2003 assembly elections, The Sun revealed that Davies had been visiting a well known cruising spot near a motorway lay-by. When challenged as to what he had been doing there, Davies initially denied being there, then told reporters that he had been going for a short walk, adding: "I have actually been there when I have been watching badgers". Davies was forced by his local party to stand down as Labour candidate in the election.

=== Political activity since 2003 ===
Davies resigned from the Labour Party in 2004, citing opposition to the Iraq War, the party's stance on university funding and worries about the competence of Welsh Labour. He subsequently joined the new Forward Wales political party, and stood for election to the European Parliament in June 2004 as a candidate of that party, but failed to be elected. He then stood unsuccessfully in the 2007 assembly elections as an independent for Caerphilly, placing third behind Labour and Plaid Cymru.

In the 2008 local elections he was elected to Caerphilly County Borough Council, as an independent councillor for the Bedwas, Trethomas and Machen ward. He also was the Cabinet Member for Regeneration.

Davies then started actively supporting the Plaid Cymru administration in Caerphilly. His Forward Wales Party disbanded in January 2010, paving the way for him to stand as a Plaid Cymru candidate. Davies appeared at a Plaid Cymru rally in Aberystwyth during the 2010 UK general election campaign. He joined the party later in 2010 and stood unsuccessfully as the party's candidate in Caerphilly in the 2011 Assembly elections. In 2012 he stood as a Plaid Cymru candidate for Bedwas, and was defeated.

Parliament of the United Kingdom
Preceded by Ednyfed Hudson Davies	Member of Parliament for Caerphilly; 1983–2001	Succeeded by Wayne David
Political offices
Preceded by William Hague	Secretary of State for Wales; 1997–1998	Succeeded by Alun Michael
Senedd
New constituency	Assembly Member for Caerphilly; 1999–2003	Succeeded by Jeffrey Cuthbert
