= 2024 Welsh government crisis =

Political crisis that led to Vaughan Gething's resignation as Welsh First Minister

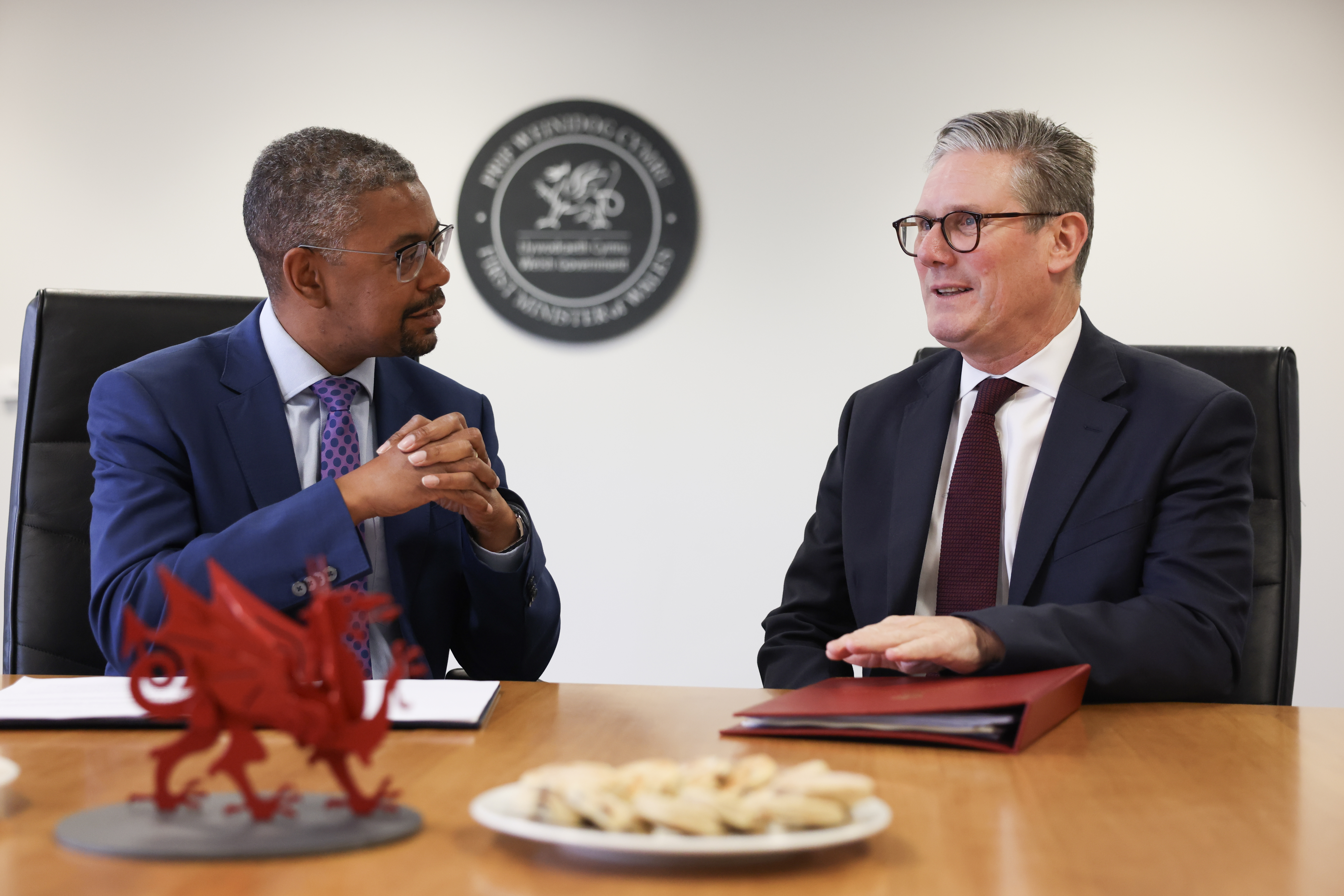
- Vaughan Gething with Keir Starmer, two weeks before Gething's resignation
- Date: 17 May – 6 August 2024
- Duration: 81 days
- Location: Wales
- Cause: Campaign donation of £200,000 from convicted businessman David John Neal; Deletion of COVID-19 messages controversy; Dismissal of Hannah Blythyn as minister; Plaid Cymru withdrawal from co-operation agreement; Loss of non-binding vote of no confidence
- Motive: Declare no confidence in Vaughan Gething as First Minister; Pressure for resignation over ethical concerns; Restore confidence in Welsh Government
- Participants: Vaughan Gething (First Minister of Wales); Welsh Labour cabinet ministers; Plaid Cymru leadership; Welsh Conservatives; Senedd members
- Outcome: Resignation of Vaughan Gething as First Minister (16 July 2024); July 2024 Welsh Labour leadership election; Appointment of Eluned Morgan as First Minister (6 August 2024); New Welsh Government formation
- Gething became the shortest-serving First Minister in Welsh devolution history

The 2024 Welsh government crisis was a political crisis that led to the resignation of Vaughan Gething as First Minister of Wales and leader of Welsh Labour on 16 July 2024, after 118 days in office. The crisis arose from multiple controversies surrounding Gething's leadership, culminating in the coordinated resignation of four senior cabinet ministers who declared they had lost confidence in his ability to govern.

The crisis originated during Gething's February–March 2024 Welsh Labour leadership election campaign when he received a £200,000 donation from David John Neal, a businessman twice convicted of environmental offences. Subsequent controversies included allegations that Gething had misled the COVID-19 inquiry about deleting text messages, his dismissal of minister Hannah Blythyn over leaked messages without a formal inquiry, and concerns about potential conflicts of interest relating to government loans to Neal's companies.

These scandals led to the breakdown of the co-operation agreement between Welsh Labour and Plaid Cymru in May 2024, leaving Gething leading a minority government. On 5 June 2024, Gething lost a non-binding vote of no confidence in the Senedd by 29 votes to 27, becoming only the second First Minister in Welsh devolution history to face such a vote. Despite initially refusing to resign and describing the motion as a "gimmick", his position became untenable on 16 July when four senior ministers—Jeremy Miles, Mick Antoniw, Julie James, and Lesley Griffiths—resigned within hours of each other.

Gething's resignation made him the shortest-serving First Minister in the 25-year history of Welsh devolution. He was succeeded by Eluned Morgan, who was elected unopposed as Welsh Labour leader and appointed First Minister on 6 August 2024. The crisis occurred just two weeks after Keir Starmer's Labour Party won the 2024 United Kingdom general election, highlighting tensions within the broader Labour movement during a period of political transition.

== Background ==
=== Gething's rise to power ===
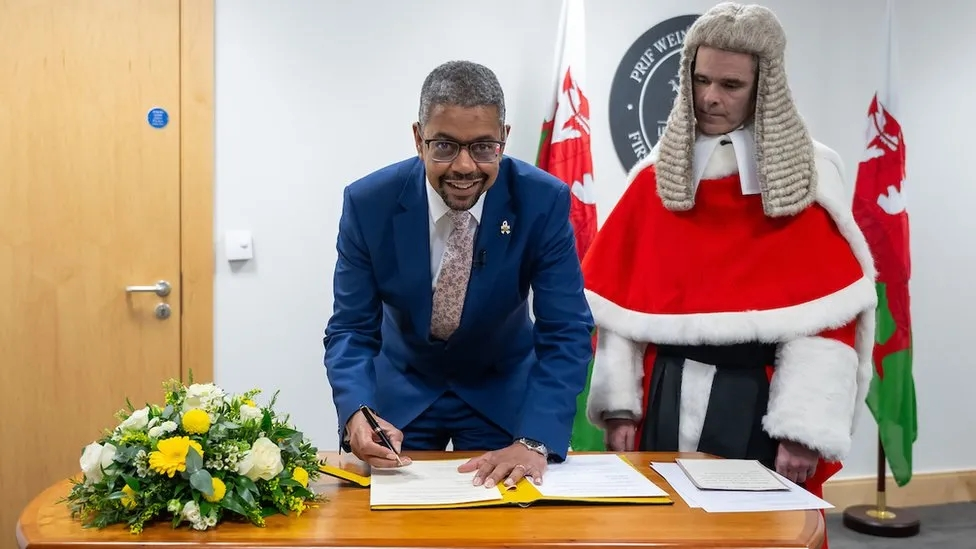
Gething being sworn in as first minister on 20 March 2024

Vaughan Gething became First Minister of Wales on 20 March 2024 following his victory in the February–March 2024 Welsh Labour leadership election, succeeding Mark Drakeford who had announced his resignation in December 2023. Gething won the leadership contest by a narrow margin of 51.7% to 48.3% against his main rival Jeremy Miles, with a low overall turnout of 16.1%.

The leadership election was notable for its divisive nature within Welsh Labour, with Miles receiving support from the majority of Labour Members of the Senedd (MSs). Gething's victory was aided by securing nominations from all of the "Big Six" trade unions, following a controversial Unite union nomination process in which Miles was deemed ineligible under a rule requiring nominees to have been "lay officials". Miles claimed he was unfairly blocked from the union nomination, with an unnamed Unite official describing Gething's nomination as a "shocking mess".

=== Early controversies and mounting pressure ===
From the outset of his tenure, Gething faced significant political challenges that would later contribute to the crisis. His appointment coincided with Welsh Labour governing as a minority administration, holding 30 of the 60 Senedd seats and requiring cooperation agreements with other parties to pass legislation effectively.

==== The Neal donation controversy ====
The most significant early controversy arose during Gething's leadership campaign when it was revealed in February 2024 that he had received a campaign donation of £200,000 from David John Neal, a businessman who had previously been convicted twice of environmental offences as head of two companies, Atlantic Recycling and Neal Soil Suppliers. The donation came from Dauson Environmental Group in two instalments of £100,000 each in December 2023 and January 2024.

Neal had been described in court as showing "a lack of respect for the rules we enforce and for the health of the environment" by Natural Resources Wales officials. The donation immediately drew criticism from within Welsh Labour, with Lee Waters, who had supported Jeremy Miles in the leadership contest, describing it as "completely unjustifiable and wrong".

==== Historical connections and conflict of interest concerns ====
The controversy deepened in March 2024 when BBC Wales revealed letters written by Gething in 2016 and 2018 to Natural Resources Wales, requesting the public body to ease restrictions on Atlantic Recycling whilst Gething was serving in the Welsh Government. This revelation raised questions about potential conflicts of interest, particularly as former Welsh Government minister Leighton Andrews called the donations "damaging devolution" and urged Gething to return the money.

Further concerns emerged in April 2024 when it was revealed that companies owned by Neal had received "huge" loans from the Development Bank of Wales, including a £400,000 loan made in February 2023 to fund the purchase of a solar farm. The Development Bank fell under Gething's remit as economy minister during his time in the post from May 2021 to March 2024. This raised concerns that money lent by the Development Bank of Wales may have effectively ended up being donated to Gething's leadership campaign.

==== The COVID-19 messages controversy ====
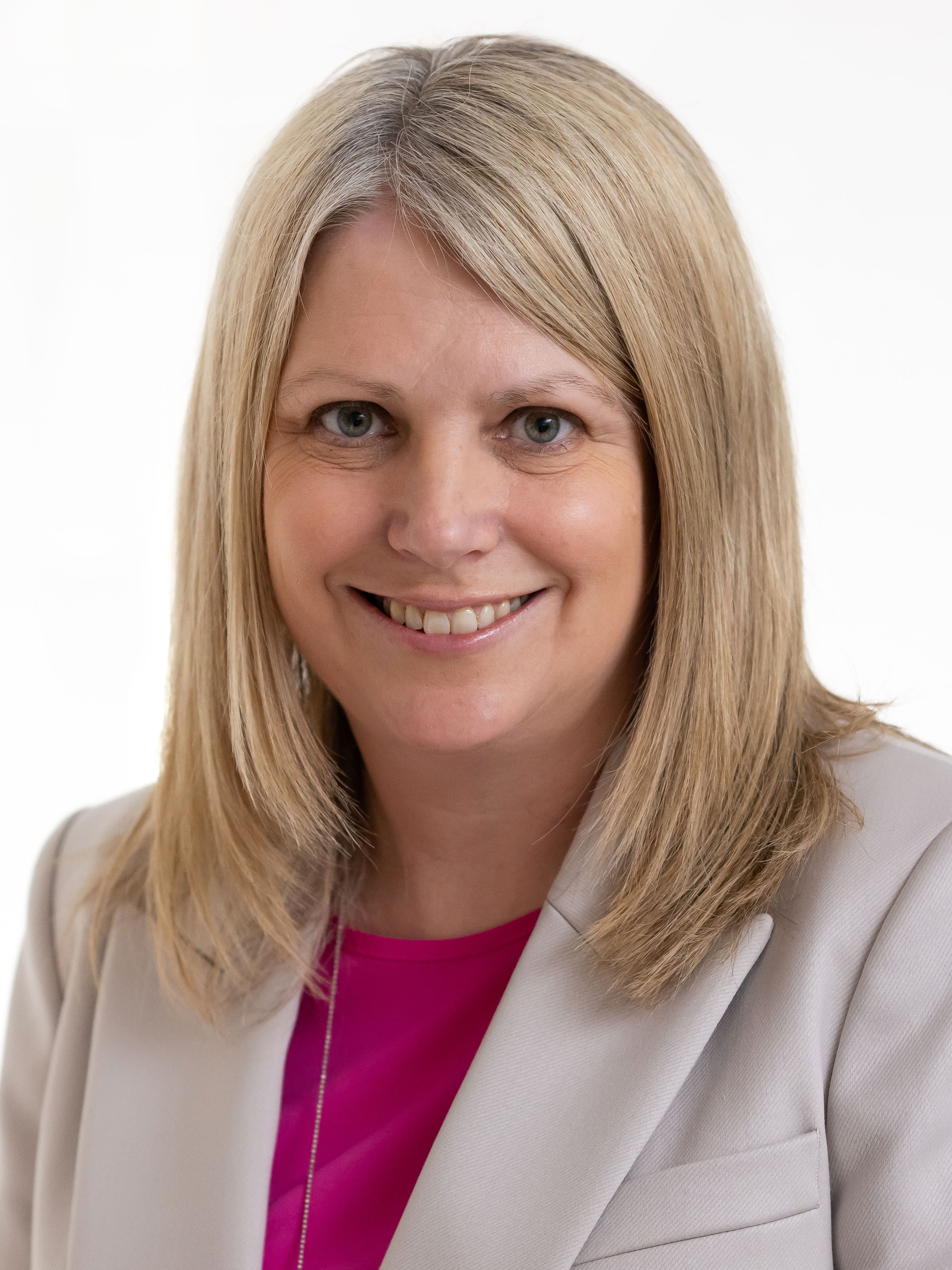
Hannah Blythyn was removed from her role as Minister for Social Partnership, after Gethin alleged that she was the leak of the text messages

During the inquiry into the COVID-19 pandemic response, Gething stated that he had not deliberately deleted any messages from his phone. However, on 7 May 2024, Nation.Cymru obtained text messages from Gething in a Welsh Government group chat, in which he said "I'm deleting the messages in this group. They can be captured in an FOI [Freedom of Information request] and I think we are all in the right place on the choice being made." Gething denied allegations of perjury put to him by Rhun ap Iorwerth in First Minister's Questions the same day, describing the allegations as 'obnoxious'.

A few days later, Gething removed Hannah Blythyn from her role as Minister for Social Partnership, alleging that she was the leak of the text messages. Blythyn denied this; she was replaced by Sarah Murphy on 17 May.

==== Breakdown of the co-operation agreement ====
On 17 May 2024, Rhun ap Iorwerth announced that Plaid Cymru had withdrawn from the co-operation agreement with Welsh Labour, six months earlier than intended. Ap Iorwerth stated: "I remain deeply concerned that the First Minister has failed to pay back the £200,000 donation to his leadership campaign from a company convicted of environmental offences, and believe it demonstrates a significant lack of judgment."

This withdrawal left Gething leading a minority administration, weakening his position significantly and making it much more difficult to pass legislation.

== Government crisis and resignation ==
=== The vote of no confidence ===
On 5 June 2024, after just 78 days as First Minister, Gething faced a non-binding vote of no-confidence in him as First Minister, tabled by the Welsh Conservatives led by Andrew RT Davies. With Welsh Labour holding 30 of the 60 Senedd seats and Plaid Cymru having withdrawn from their co-operation agreement, the outcome depended on Labour attendance. Gething lost the vote by a margin of 29 votes to 27.

==== Vote breakdown ====
The motion was carried by 29 votes to 27: a majority of 2. The Welsh Conservatives (16 MSs), Plaid Cymru (12 MSs), Welsh Liberal Democrat leader Jane Dodds (1 MS), and independent MS Rhys ab Owen (1 MS) all voted in favour of the no-confidence motion. Labour's defeat was caused by the absence of two Labour MSs who were unable to vote due to illness: Hannah Blythyn and Lee Waters. The remaining 27 Labour MSs who were present voted against the motion. Neither the Presiding Officer of the Senedd nor the Deputy Presiding Officer participated in the vote, as is standard practice.

Motion of no confidence in the First Minister
Ballot →	5 June 2024
Required majority →	29 out of 56 voting MSs (Note: Based on 60 MSs minus the Presiding Officer of the Senedd (Elin Jones) and Deputy Presiding Officer (David Rees), who do not vote by convention, and two Labour MSs (Hannah Blythyn and Lee Waters) who were absent due to illness (total 4).)
Ayes: • Conservative (16): Natasha Asghar, Andrew RT Davies, Gareth Davies, Paul Davies, James Evans, Janet Finch-Saunders, Peter Fox, Russell George, Tom Giffard, Altaf Hussain, Mark Isherwood, Joel James, Laura Anne Jones, Samuel Kurtz, Darren Millar, Sam Rowlands; • Plaid Cymru (12): Mabon ap Gwynfor, Rhun ap Iorwerth, Cefin Campbell, Luke Fletcher, Heledd Fychan, Llyr Gruffydd, Siân Gwenllian, Delyth Jewell, Peredur Owen Griffiths, Adam Price, Sioned Williams (Note: Elin Jones (Plaid Cymru) did not vote as Presiding Officer of the Senedd. One additional Plaid Cymru MS voted for the motion.); • Lib Dem (1): Jane Dodds; • Independent (1): Rhys ab Owen	29 / 56
Noes: • Welsh Labour (27): Mick Antoniw, Dawn Bowden, Jayne Bryant, Hefin David, Alun Davies, Rebecca Evans, Vaughan Gething, John Griffiths, Lesley Griffiths, Mike Hedges, Vikki Howells, Jane Hutt, Huw Irranca-Davies, Julie James, Jeremy Miles, Eluned Morgan, Julie Morgan, Sarah Murphy, Lynne Neagle, Rhianon Passmore, Jenny Rathbone, Jack Sargeant, Ken Skates, Carolyn Thomas, Joyce Watson, Buffy Williams (Note: David Rees (Welsh Labour) did not vote as Deputy Presiding Officer. Hannah Blythyn and Lee Waters were absent due to illness.)	27 / 56
Sources: Wales Online, Nation.Cymru

Prior to the vote, Gething and his allies dismissed the no-confidence motion as a "transparent gimmick". During the debate, Gething became visibly emotional, wiping tears from his eyes as Labour MS Vikki Howells spoke in his defence. Rebecca Evans passed him a tissue, and he was observed drinking water as he "composed himself". During the debate, Gething told the Senedd: "I am human, I am fallible... It hurts deeply when my intentions are questioned." Following the defeat, Gething stated: "I'm here, proud to be the first minister of Wales to serve and lead my country." The motion was only the third such vote in the Senedd's history, the first two being against Alun Michael in 1999 and 2000.

=== Continued leadership and mounting pressure ===
Despite losing the no-confidence vote, Gething announced on 8 June that he would not resign as First Minister. Under the Government of Wales Act 2006, Gething was legally entitled to remain in post as there is only a requirement to resign following a vote of no confidence in the whole government, not specifically in the First Minister.

However, the defeat left Gething leading "a Labour group in the Senedd that was riddled by deep divisions" with a minority government that "lacked any credible partners". Having lost the confidence of the Senedd, political observers noted that Gething's fall appeared to be "only a matter of time".

=== The final collapse: 16 July 2024 ===
==== Morning resignations ====
On the morning of 16 July 2024, Gething's position became untenable when four senior cabinet ministers resigned in coordinated fashion, each posting resignation letters on social media calling for him to step down.

The resignations began with Mick Antoniw, the Counsel General for Wales, who accused Gething of providing "rudderless" leadership. Antoniw stated: "Wales needs confident and stable government. I do not believe you are capable of delivering that... You have lost a vote of confidence in the Senedd. That is something I regard as being of major constitutional importance."

Housing Secretary Julie James followed, stating that Gething's premiership "threatens the continued existence of the devolution journey itself". Her resignation letter expressed deep concerns about "the circumstances surrounding certain campaign donations you received; the outcome of the vote of no confidence; and the sacking of a ministerial colleague for leaking when no formal leak inquiry had taken place".

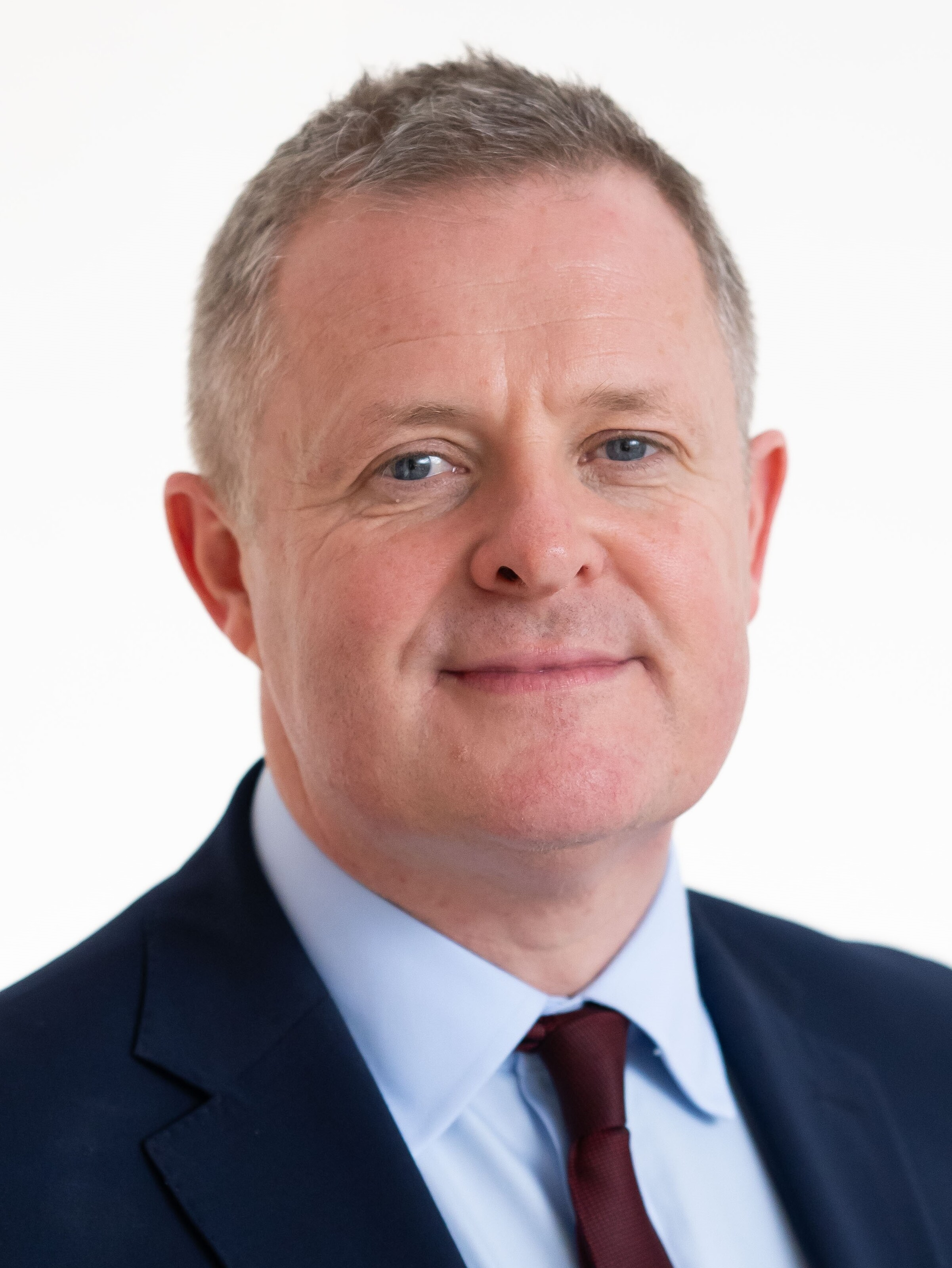
Jeremy Miles resigned citing the "loss of the confidence vote" as his reason.

Most significantly, Jeremy Miles, Gething's former leadership rival and Economy Secretary, resigned with a critical assessment. Miles stated: "We cannot continue like this... The events of the last few months, including your loss of the confidence vote in the Senedd, have been incredibly painful... I can't see any way forward for us which allows us to get on with job we are elected to do, without you standing down." Lesley Griffiths, the Culture Secretary, also resigned, citing the fractured relationships within the government.

==== Gething's resignation announcement ====
Just over an hour after the ministerial resignations, at approximately 12:43 PM, Gething announced his intention to resign. In a statement, he said: "I have this morning taken the difficult decision to begin the process of stepping down as leader of the Welsh Labour Party and, as a result, First Minister. Having been elected as leader of my party in March, I had hoped that over the summer a period of reflection, rebuilding and renewal could take place under my leadership. I recognise now that this is not possible."

In conclusion to his statement, Gething maintained his innocence, describing allegations against him as "pernicious, politically motivated and patently untrue". He stated: "In 11 years as a minister, I have never ever made a decision for personal gain... My integrity matters. I have not compromised it."

=== Support and opposition dynamics ===
Throughout the crisis, Gething's support within Welsh Labour remained limited. Academic analysis noted that he had adopted "the style of leadership... of a leader at the head of a majority administration who enjoyed overwhelming internal support in his party", when "neither of these things were true".

Welsh Labour's BAME committee provided notable support, issuing a statement defending Gething against what they described as criticism that had "gone well beyond what one can reasonably call fair scrutiny", suggesting some attacks contained "racially charged language". However, political opponents, including Plaid Cymru leader Rhun ap Iorwerth, firmly rejected any suggestion of racism in their scrutiny of Gething's actions and judgment.

Notably, when Gething made his resignation statement in the Senedd chamber, there was "some applause from the Labour benches, but not all, notably Mark Drakeford did not engage".

=== Immediate aftermath and leadership succession ===
Gething's resignation, announced 118 days into his tenure, made him the shortest-serving First Minister in the 25-year history of Welsh devolution, surpassing the previous record held by Alun Michael. Commenting on the resignation, Michael said Gething was "in effect forced out".

On 24 July 2024, Eluned Morgan was elected unopposed as Welsh Labour leader after receiving support from at least 26 of the 30 Labour MSs, including former First Minister Mark Drakeford and former leadership candidate Jeremy Miles. On 6 August 2024, Morgan was appointed by the Senedd as First Minister of Wales, with Gething formally resigning to the King on 5 August. Morgan announced the members of her government later that day, including Huw Irranca-Davies as Deputy First Minister.

== Reactions ==
=== Government and Labour Party reactions ===
Prime Minister Keir Starmer issued a statement thanking Gething for his service, highlighting his historic achievement as the first black leader of a European country. Starmer stated: "Vaughan should take enormous pride in being the first black leader of any country in Europe. That achievement will have broadened the ambitions and raised the gaze of a generation of young people in Wales and beyond. I know what a difficult decision this has been for him – but I also know that he has made it because he feels it is the best decision now for Wales."

Former First Minister Mark Drakeford, Gething's immediate predecessor, commented on his successor's brief tenure. Speaking to ITV Wales, Drakeford stated: "I thought Vaughan deserved much better. I think he was well prepared to be a First Minister." Drakeford described looking back on Gething's tenure "with a great deal of sadness".

Welsh Secretary Jo Stevens responded, stating: "I want to thank Vaughan for his service as First Minister and in his other ministerial roles over the past eleven years. It is now for Welsh Labour to determine his successor. The people of Wales voted for a UK Labour government to deliver change. That remains my absolute focus."

=== Opposition party reactions ===
Opposition leaders were critical of both Gething and the broader Labour Party. Welsh Conservative leader Andrew RT Davies argued that Labour figures bore collective responsibility for the crisis. Davies stated: "Vaughan Gething's resignation is long overdue. But there can be no doubt that his Labour colleagues, from those who resigned today all the way up to Keir Starmer, have stood by his side, and are culpable for the breakdown in governance in Wales. Wales will remember."

Plaid Cymru leader Rhun ap Iorwerth called for broader political change in Wales, including a snap Senedd election. Ap Iorwerth stated: "The people of Wales have lost faith in the First Minister, belatedly he has done the right thing and resigned. But the people of Wales are losing confidence in Labour's ability to govern Wales... This could be the third Labour first minister in seven months – a revolving door of chaos. Labour has put party interests ahead of the interests of the nation for too long. The people of Wales must be given the opportunity to elect a new government and an election must be called."

Welsh Liberal Democrat leader Jane Dodds similarly called for an early election to restore public confidence in Welsh governance.

The Wales Green Party also responded to the resignation. Wales Green Party Leader Anthony Slaughter stated: "After over three months of chaos at the heart of Welsh Government the news that Vaughan Gething has finally resigned following the resignation of four ministers this morning is to be welcomed, but questions must be asked as to why this situation was tolerated for so long, damaging and undermining devolution and our democracy."

=== Analysis and commentary ===
Political commentators noted broader implications for the Labour Party. The crisis occurred just two weeks after Keir Starmer's Labour victory in the 2024 United Kingdom general election, with analysts describing it as "a blow to UK Prime Minister Keir Starmer and his new Labour administration". The Institute for Government concluded that "this has been a difficult time for the Welsh government – and for Labour in Wales. Mark Drakeford stepped down on his own terms. Vaughan Gething very much did not as his government collapsed after just 118 days."

Welsh political journalist Will Hayward, writing in his Substack analysis, argued that Gething's downfall stemmed from his defensive response to the donations controversy. Hayward noted that "When the revelations around the £200k donation Vaughan Gething received from a convicted criminal came to light his repeated reaction was: 'I have broken no rules'. This was all he would say." He suggested that a more proactive response acknowledging public concerns might have prevented the crisis from escalating.

ITV Cymru Wales Political Editor Adrian Masters observed the unprecedented nature of the crisis within Welsh Labour. Masters noted: "In the decades that I've been covering Welsh politics there has been one truism: Welsh Labour keeps most of its differences behind closed doors and unites in public. Not today." He argued that "Differences and division have spilled out into the open and no amount of warm words about unity can disguise those differences", describing the divisions as "the deepest and most public that they've been for 25 years".

The crisis highlighted the role of investigative journalism in Welsh politics. Veteran political reporter Martin Shipton of Nation.Cymru, who reported extensively on the donations scandal, was later awarded Journalist of the Year for his coverage. Industry observers praised the role of "serious journalism" and "sustained media scrutiny by dedicated journalists holding public officials to account" in exposing the scandal.

== See also ==
- 2024 Scottish government crisis
