= Opinion polling for the 2026 Senedd election =

In the run-up to the 2026 Senedd election, various organisations conducted opinion polls to gauge voting intentions. Results of such polls are displayed in this list. The pollsters listed are members of the British Polling Council (BPC) and abided by its disclosure rules. The date range for these opinion polls is from the previous Senedd election, held on 6 May 2021, to the day of the election, held on 7 May 2026.

It was the seventh devolved general election since the Senedd (formerly the National Assembly for Wales) was established in 1999. It was also be the first election following reforms to the voting system, which increased the size of the Senedd from 60 members to 96, adopted a party-list voting system, reduced the number of constituencies to sixteen, and shortened its term from five years to four. However the 23 October 2025 Caerphilly by-election where 33,689 votes were cast used first-past-the-post voting.

== Opinion polling ==
=== Polling using the 2026 electoral system ===
For the 2026 election, Wales was divided into 16 multi-member constituencies, each based on a pairing of two adjacent constituencies used for the UK Parliament since 2024. Each of these 16 constituencies elected six members of the Senedd using a system of proportional representation.

Labour led in most polls until early 2025, when opinion polls began to show Plaid Cymru and Reform as each leading or tied.

LOESS curve of polling conducted

Sample size below 1,000. (Note: The British Polling Council states that a sample size of at least 1,000 is the "established norm" for any poll in Great Britain. However, there is no "minimum" acceptable sample size.)

Dates conducted	Pollster	Client	Sample size	Lab	Con	PC	Grn	LD	Ref	Others	Lead
7 May 2026	2026 Senedd election		–	11.1%	10.7%	35.4%	6.7%	4.5%	29.3%	2.3%	6.1
1–6 May 2026	FindOutNow	N/A	2,001	9%	11%	35%	9%	6%	28%	2%	7
1–6 May 2026	Survation	N/A	1,054	15%	10%	30%	7%	6%	28%	3%	2
27 Apr – 4 May 2026	YouGov	ITV Cymru Wales / Cardiff University	4,647	12%	9%	33%	8%	6%	29%	3%	4
2 Mar – 27 Apr 2026	More in Common	N/A	2,159	16%	12%	30%	9%	4%	27%	2%	3
17–23 Apr 2026	Survation	S4C/Aberystwyth University	834	15%	10%	28%	10%	4%	30%	4%	2
18–22 Apr 2026	Find Out Now	Plaid Cymru	2,012	10%	13%	29%	11%	6%	27%	4%	2
6–15 Apr 2026	YouGov	ITV Cymru Wales / Cardiff University	2,387	13%	8%	29%	10%	6%	29%	4%	Tie
31 Mar – 13 Apr 2026	JL Partners	The Telegraph	2,050	16%	12%	29%	9%	6%	25%	4%	4
30 Jan – 10 Apr 2026	More in Common	N/A	2,519	21%	11%	25%	10%	7%	25%	2%	Tie
2–8 Apr 2026	Ipsos	N/A	747	15%	12%	30%	10%	6%	25%	2%	5
2–22 Mar 2026	Beaufort Research	Nation.Cymru	459	17%	9%	30%	11%	6%	27%	2%	3
9–18 Mar 2026	YouGov	ITV Cymru Wales / Cardiff University	2,978	13%	7%	33%	12%	5%	27%	4%	6
15 Feb – 3 Mar 2026	More in Common	N/A	851	20%	10%	26%	10%	7%	26%	1%	Tie
30 Jan – 10 Feb 2026	More in Common	N/A	806	20%	13%	24%	5%	6%	31%	1%	7
19 Jan – 8 Feb 2026	Beaufort Research	Nation.Cymru	486	20%	10%	29%	7%	5%	27%	1%	2
5–12 Jan 2026	YouGov	ITV Cymru Wales / Cardiff University	1,220	10%	10%	37%	13%	5%	23%	2%	14
16 Dec – 4 Jan 2026	FindOutNow	N/A	1,503	12%	12%	30%	9%	7%	29%	2%	1
28 Nov – 10 Dec 2025	YouGov	Cardiff University	1,891	10%	10%	33%	9%	6%	30%	2%	3
10–30 Nov 2025	Beaufort Research	Nation.Cymru	505	21%	12%	26%	9%	3%	27%	1%	1
23 Oct 2025	2025 Caerphilly by-election, Plaid Cymru gain from Labour										
22 Sep – 12 Oct 2025	Beaufort Research	Nation.Cymru	533	23%	11%	22%	9%	4%	30%	2%	7
4–10 Sep 2025	YouGov	Barn Cymru / ITV Cymru Wales / Cardiff University	1,232	14%	11%	30%	6%	6%	29%	4%	1
18 Jun – 3 Jul 2025	Beaufort Research	Nation.Cymru	400	27%	13%	21%	6%	5%	25%	2%	2
18 Jun – 3 Jul 2025	More in Common	Sky News	883	23%	10%	26%	4%	7%	28%	2%	2
5–16 Jun 2025	FindOutNow	N/A	2,101	18%	11%	27%	7%	7%	29%	1%	2
23–30 Apr 2025	YouGov	ITV Cymru Wales / Cardiff University	1,265	18%	13%	30%	5%	7%	25%	2%	5
10 Mar – 3 Apr 2025	Survation	N/A	809	27%	15%	24%	5%	5%	24%	1%	3
3–23 Mar 2025	Beaufort Research	Nation.Cymru	1,000	27%	16%	24%	5%	4%	23%	1%	3
25–29 Nov 2024	YouGov	Barn Cymru	1,121	23%	19%	24%	6%	5%	23%	1%	1
4–24 Nov 2024	Beaufort Research	Nation.Cymru	500	27%	18%	17%	6%	6%	24%	2%	3
18 Oct – 4 Nov 2024	Survation (Note: Survation asked voters to give their preferences under the previous Additional Member System. The figure shown in this table is the proportional (regional) vote, as that is the closest equivalent to the new party list system.)	Reform UK	2,006	29%	18%	20%	7%	7%	19%	1%	9
24 Jul – 6 Aug 2024	Eluned Morgan is elected leader of Welsh Labour and becomes First Minister of Wales										
5–18 Jul 2024	Welsh Election Study	N/A	2,565	25%	16%	24%	6%	6%	16%	8% AWA on 7% Other on 1%	1
4 Jul 2024	2024 United Kingdom general election										
27 Jun – 1 Jul 2024	YouGov	Barn Cymru	1,072	27%	18%	23%	5%	6%	18%	3%	4
5–7 Jun 2024	Redfield & Wilton	N/A	960	36%	22%	18%	6%	6%	11%	2% AWA on 2% Other on 0%	14
30 May – 3 Jun 2024	YouGov	Barn Cymru	1,066	30%	19%	23%	6%	6%	12%	4%	7
18–19 May 2024	Redfield & Wilton	N/A	900	37%	20%	20%	5%	3%	10%	5% AWA on 5% Other on 0%	17
8 May 2024	The Senedd Reform Act is approved, implementing a new one-list electoral system by 2026.										
6 May 2021	2021 Senedd election (regional)		–	36.2%	25.1%	20.7%	4.4%	4.3%	1.1%	8.2%	11.1
6 May 2021	2021 Senedd election (constituency)		–	39.9%	26.1%	20.3%	1.6%	4.9%	1.6%	5.6%	13.8

=== Past opinion polling ===
The following polls used questions designed for the two forms of voting in previous Senedd elections, that were abolished in the next Senedd election planned for 2026.

==== Regional vote ====
Sample size below 1,000.

Dates conducted	Pollster	Client	Sample size	Lab	Con	PC	Grn	LD	AWA	UKIP	Ref	Others	Lead
24 Jun 2024	The Senedd Reform Act receives Royal assent, abolishing the additional member system by 2026.												
22–23 Apr 2024	Redfield & Wilton	N/A	840	33%	18%	19%	6%	7%	5%	–	12%	1%	14
23–24 Mar 2024	Redfield & Wilton	N/A	878	32%	16%	18%	9%	7%	6%	–	11%	1%	14
16–20 Mar 2024	Vaughan Gething is elected leader of Welsh Labour and becomes First Minister of Wales												
18 Feb 2024	Redfield & Wilton	N/A	874	29%	16%	25%	4%	8%	7%	–	10%	1%	4
24–26 Jan 2024	Redfield & Wilton	N/A	1,100	34%	19%	21%	6%	6%	6%	–	7%	1%	13
10–11 Dec 2023	Redfield & Wilton	N/A	1,086	28%	20%	24%	7%	8%	4%	–	7%	1%	4
12–13 Nov 2023	Redfield & Wilton	N/A	1,100	32%	21%	18%	9%	6%	5%	–	7%	1%	11
14–15 Oct 2023	Redfield & Wilton	N/A	959	31%	21%	24%	4%	5%	7%	–	8%	0%	10
16–17 Sep 2023	Redfield & Wilton	N/A	1,172	35%	21%	18%	6%	12%	2%	–	5%	1%	14
1–6 Sep 2023	YouGov	Barn Cymru	1,051	34%	16%	20%	6%	6%	9%	1%	6%	2%	14
13–14 Aug 2023	Redfield & Wilton	N/A	1,068	31%	19%	22%	6%	10%	–	–	10%	3%	9
14–16 Jul 2023	Redfield & Wilton	N/A	1,050	33%	20%	19%	6%	10%	–	–	6%	4%	13
17–18 Jun 2023	Redfield & Wilton	N/A	1,000	30%	22%	20%	6%	9%	–	–	8%	4%	8
16 Jun 2023	Rhun ap Iorwerth is elected leader of Plaid Cymru												
12–17 May 2023	YouGov	Barn Cymru	1,064	36%	16%	18%	7%	7%	5%	1%	7%	1%	18
14–15 May 2023	Redfield & Wilton	N/A	1,058	30%	21%	24%	4%	10%	–	–	8%	4%	6
15–17 Apr 2023	Redfield & Wilton	N/A	1,251	32%	22%	23%	7%	8%	–	–	7%	2%	9
3–7 Feb 2023	YouGov	Barn Cymru	1,081	39%	18%	20%	5%	5%	6%	–	6%	2%	19
25 Nov – 1 Dec 2022	YouGov	Barn Cymru	1,042	38%	16%	23%	5%	2%	8%	2%	4%	2% Gwlad 1% Other 1%	15
20–22 Sep 2022	YouGov	Barn Cymru	1,014	37%	18%	21%	5%	5%	7%	2%	4%	1%	16
12–16 Jun 2022	YouGov	Barn Cymru	1,020	31%	21%	24%	6%	5%	6%	2%	6%	2% Gwlad 1% Other 1%	7
25 Feb – 1 Mar 2022	YouGov	Barn Cymru	1,086	34%	23%	20%	4%	6%	6%	1%	3%	2% Gwlad 1% Other 1%	11
13–16 Dec 2021	YouGov	ITV Wales	1,009	35%	22%	19%	7%	3%	6%	2%	5%	1%	13
13–16 Sep 2021	YouGov	ITV Wales	1,057	33%	26%	19%	5%	4%	6%	4%	2%	1%	7
6 May 2021	2021 Senedd election		–	36.2%	25.1%	20.7%	4.4%	4.3%	3.7%	1.6%	1.1%	2.9%	11.1

===== By section =====
Date conducted	Pollster	Client	Subsection	Sample size	Lab	Con	PC	Grn	LD	Ref	Lead
November 2024	Beaufort Research	Nation.Cymru	South West Wales and the Valleys	1000 (500)	28	13	19	4	6	27	1
November 2024	Beaufort Research	Nation.Cymru	Cardiff and South East Wales	1000 (500)	34	23	10	6	8	16	11
November 2024	Beaufort Research	Nation.Cymru	North and Mid Wales	1000 (500)	21	18	24	8	4	24	Tie
November 2024	Beaufort Research	Nation.Cymru	Male voters	1000 (500)	28	20	10	6	7	27	1
November 2024	Beaufort Research	Nation.Cymru	Female voters	1000 (500)	27	15	26	6	5	20	1
November 2024	Beaufort Research	Nation.Cymru	Aged 16-34	1000 (500)	37	9	21	9	7	17	16
November 2024	Beaufort Research	Nation.Cymru	Aged 34-54	1000 (500)	32	15	21	4	8	19	11
November 2024	Beaufort Research	Nation.Cymru	Aged over 55	1000 (500)	21	22	15	6	5	29	7
November 2024	Beaufort Research	Nation.Cymru	ABC1	1000 (500)	28	23	18	7	6	15	5
November 2024	Beaufort Research	Nation.Cymru	C2DE	1000 (500)	26	11	17	5	6	34	8
November 2024	Beaufort Research	Nation.Cymru	Welsh speakers	1000 (500)	24	16	31	5	6	17	7
November 2024	Beaufort Research	Nation.Cymru	Non-Welsh speakers	1000 (500)	29	18	13	6	6	26	3

==== Constituency vote ====
LOESS curve of the polling for the next Senedd Election Constituency Votes.

Sample size below 1,000.

Dates conducted	Pollster	Client	Sample size	Lab	Con	PC	LD	AWA	Grn	Ref	Other	Lead
8 May 2024	The Senedd Reform Act is approved, abolishing the additional member system by 2026.											
22–23 Apr 2024	Redfield & Wilton	N/A	840	37%	21%	22%	4%	3%	3%	10%	0%	15
23–24 Mar 2024	Redfield & Wilton	N/A	878	36%	21%	21%	3%	3%	3%	11%	1%	15
16–20 Mar 2024	Vaughan Gething is elected leader of Welsh Labour and becomes First Minister of Wales											
18 Feb 2024	Redfield & Wilton	N/A	874	34%	21%	19%	6%	4%	3%	13%	0%	13
24–26 Jan 2024	Redfield & Wilton	N/A	1,100	39%	25%	18%	3%	3%	4%	9%	1%	14
10–11 Dec 2023	Redfield & Wilton	N/A	1,086	41%	22%	17%	7%	3%	3%	7%	0%	19
12–13 Nov 2023	Redfield & Wilton	N/A	1,100	40%	23%	18%	3%	3%	4%	7%	0%	17
14–15 Oct 2023	Redfield & Wilton	N/A	959	37%	27%	18%	4%	5%	3%	6%	0%	10
16–17 Sep 2023	Redfield & Wilton	N/A	1,172	39%	27%	18%	5%	1%	6%	3%	1%	12
1–6 Sep 2023	YouGov	Barn Cymru	1,051	41%	18%	19%	6%	–	4%	8%	7%	22
13–14 Aug 2023	Redfield & Wilton	N/A	1,068	37%	21%	20%	6%	–	3%	9%	4%	16
14–16 Jul 2023	Redfield & Wilton	N/A	1,050	42%	22%	16%	6%	–	3%	7%	3%	20
17–18 Jun 2023	Redfield & Wilton	N/A	1,000	36%	22%	19%	7%	–	3%	10%	3%	14
16 Jun 2023	Rhun ap Iorwerth is elected leader of Plaid Cymru											
12–17 May 2023	YouGov	Barn Cymru	1,064	40%	18%	17%	7%	–	5%	8%	4%	22
14–15 May 2023	Redfield & Wilton	N/A	1,058	38%	23%	20%	7%	–	3%	7%	2%	15
15–17 Apr 2023	Redfield & Wilton	N/A	1,251	41%	21%	20%	5%	–	4%	8%	2%	20
3–7 Feb 2023	YouGov	Barn Cymru	1,081	43%	18%	20%	4%	–	4%	9%	1%	23
25 Nov – 1 Dec 2022	YouGov	Barn Cymru	1,042	44%	17%	20%	6%	–	3%	7%	4%	24
20–22 Sep 2022	YouGov	Barn Cymru	1,014	40%	20%	22%	6%	–	3%	5%	4%	18
12–16 Jun 2022	YouGov	Barn Cymru	1,020	37%	24%	21%	6%	–	5%	5%	3%	13
25 Feb – 1 Mar 2022	YouGov	Barn Cymru	1,086	38%	24%	21%	6%	–	3%	5%	4%	14
13–16 Dec 2021	YouGov	ITV Wales	1,009	40%	23%	17%	4%	–	5%	7%	4%	17
13–16 Sep 2021	YouGov	ITV Wales	1,057	37%	27%	19%	5%	–	4%	5%	5%	10
6 May 2021	2021 Senedd election		–	39.9%	26.1%	20.3%	4.9%	1.6%	1.6%	1.6%	5.6%	13.8

== Seat projections ==
Various modelling efforts produced seat projections ahead of the election. Below are selected projections and the result of the previous election for comparison.

49 seats needed for a majority.

Seat projections by poll aggregators
Organisation	Dates conducted	Lab	Con	PC	Grn	LD	Ref	Others	Majority
2026 election	7 May 2026	9	7	43	2	1	34	0	Plaid Cymru −6
YouGov	25 Apr – 4 May 2026	12	4	43	2	1	34	0	Plaid Cymru −6
YouGov	6 Apr – 15 Apr 2026	12	3	36	7	1	37	0	Reform −12
More in Common	30 Jan – 10 Apr 2026	24	7	30	4	3	28	0	Plaid Cymru −19
Beaufort Research	2 – 22 Mar 2026	15	6	37	6	2	30	0	Plaid Cymru −12
YouGov	9 – 18 Mar 2026	12	1	43	10	0	30	0	Plaid Cymru −6
Beaufort Research	19 Jan – 8 Feb 2026	23	7	35	1	1	29	0	Plaid Cymru −14
YouGov	5 – 12 Jan 2026	8	6	45	11	3	23	0	Plaid Cymru −4
YouGov	28 Nov – 10 Dec 2025	8	6	39	5	3	35	0	Plaid Cymru −10
Cavendish Cymru/NationCymru–Beaufort	21 October 2025	24	7	25	2	1	37	0	Reform −12
2021 election	6 May 2021	30	16	13	0	1	0	0	Labour −1

== See also ==
- List of political parties in Wales
- Opinion polling on Welsh independence
- Polling in Wales for 2024 United Kingdom general election
- Polling in Wales for the next United Kingdom general election
