= July 2024 Welsh Labour leadership election =

- 20–24 July 2024
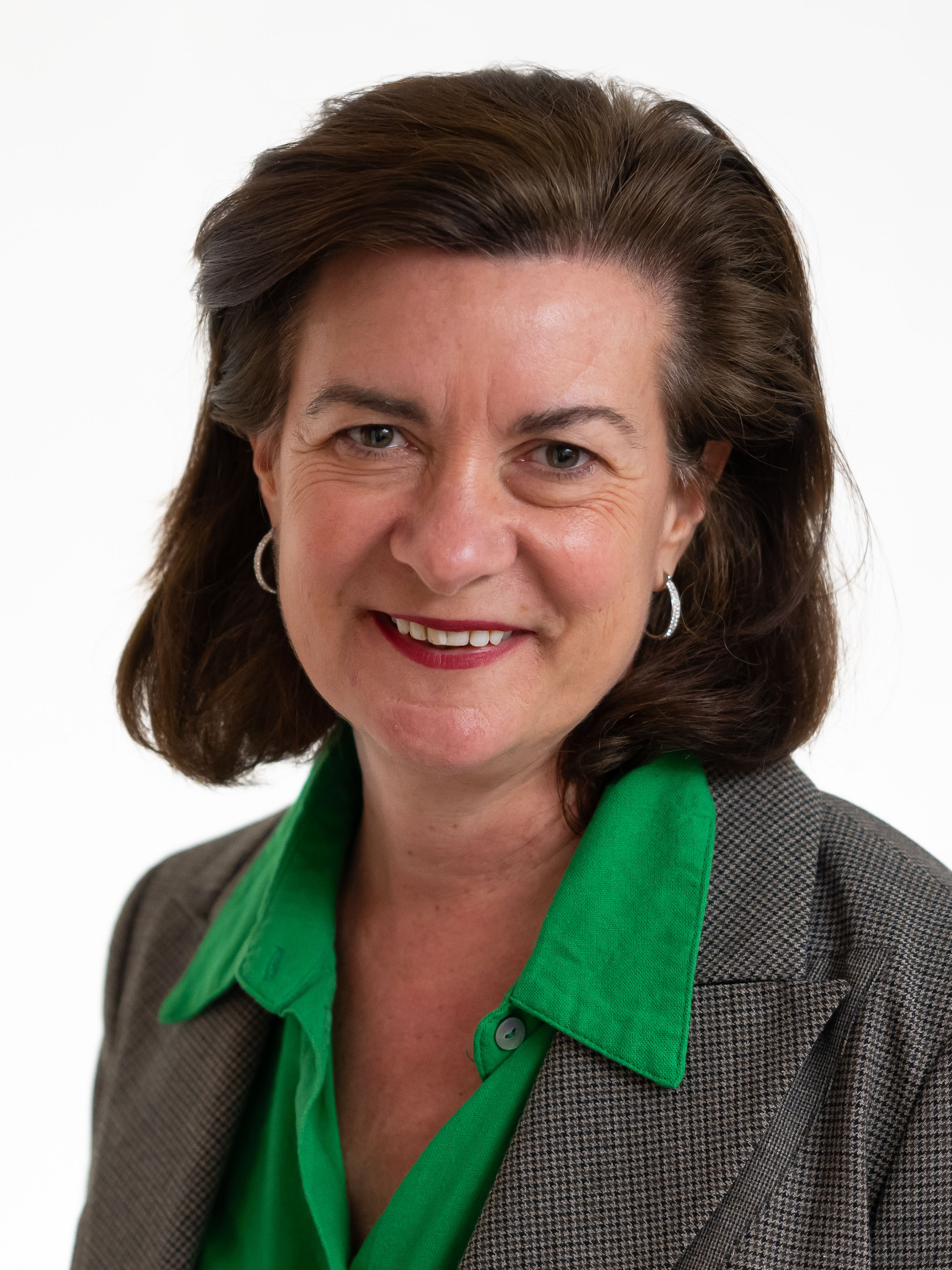
Candidate	Eluned Morgan
Popular vote	Unopposed
Leader before election
Vaughan Gething
Elected Leader
Eluned Morgan

The July 2024 Welsh Labour leadership election was held to elect Vaughan Gething's successor as leader of Welsh Labour, after he announced his resignation on 16 July 2024, just four months following he was elected. After nominations closed on 24 July 2024 at 12:00, Eluned Morgan was confirmed to be the sole candidate, and therefore elected leader unopposed.

== Background ==
Following Mark Drakeford's resignation as First Minister of Wales and Leader of Welsh Labour, Vaughan Gething was elected to succeed him in the February–March 2024 Welsh Labour leadership election. Gething was officially nominated as First Minister by the Senedd on 20 March 2024, and announced his cabinet the following day. In the process, he became the first black First Minister of Wales, as well as the first black leader of any European country. His appointment to His Majesty's Most Honourable Privy Council was announced on 28 March 2024 as part of the 2024 Special Honours.

During the inquiry into the COVID-19 pandemic response, Gething stated that he had not deliberately deleted any messages from his phone. On 7 May, Nation.Cymru obtained text messages from Gething in a Welsh Government group chat, in which he said "I'm deleting the messages in this group. They can be captured in an FOI [Freedom of Information request] and I think we are all in the right place on the choice being made." Gething denied allegations of perjury put to him by Rhun ap Iorwerth in First Minister's Questions the same day, describing the allegations as 'obnoxious'. A few days later, he removed Hannah Blythyn from her role as Minister for Social Partnership, alleging that she was the leak of the text messages. She denied this. Blythyn was replaced by Sarah Murphy on 17 May.

On 17 May, Rhun ap Iorwerth announced that Plaid Cymru had withdrawn from the co-operation agreement with Welsh Labour. On 5 June, after just 77 days as First Minister, Gething faced a non-binding vote of no-confidence in him as First Minister, tabled by the Welsh Conservatives, in which he lost by a margin of 29 votes to 27. Despite losing the no confidence vote, Gething announced he would not resign as First Minister on 8 June. However, on 16 July, he announced his resignation, an hour after ministers Mick Antoniw, Julie James, Lesley Griffiths and Jeremy Miles stepped down from their posts. His resignation, announced 118 days into his premiership, formally took effect when his successor was elected and made him the shortest serving First Minister since the role was created, a record previously held by Alun Michael as First Secretary of Wales.

== Timeline ==
The timeline for the election was discussed by the Welsh Executive Committee on 20 July 2024 and announced on the same day. Nominations opened at 19:00 BST on 20 July and are scheduled to close at 12:00 on 24 July. Nominees needed the support of five Labour Members of the Senedd to be included on the ballot paper. If there was more than one candidate, ballot papers would have been sent out to members of Welsh Labour and their affiliated bodies, including trade unions, on 22 August, to be returned by 13 September, with the result announced on 14 September.

However, as only Eluned Morgan was nominated, she was elected unopposed as the new leader with the close of nominations on 24 July.

== Candidates ==
=== Nominated ===
- Eluned Morgan, cabinet secretary for health and social care

=== Declined ===
- Hannah Blythyn, former minister for social partnership
- Mick Antoniw, former counsel general (endorsed Morgan)
- Huw Irranca-Davies, cabinet secretary for climate change and rural affairs (endorsed Morgan)
- Jeremy Miles, former cabinet secretary for economy, energy and Welsh language (endorsed Morgan)
- Ken Skates, cabinet secretary for North Wales and transport (endorsed Morgan)
