= Vikki Howells =

Welsh Labour politician, MS for Cynon Valley

Vikki Howells MS
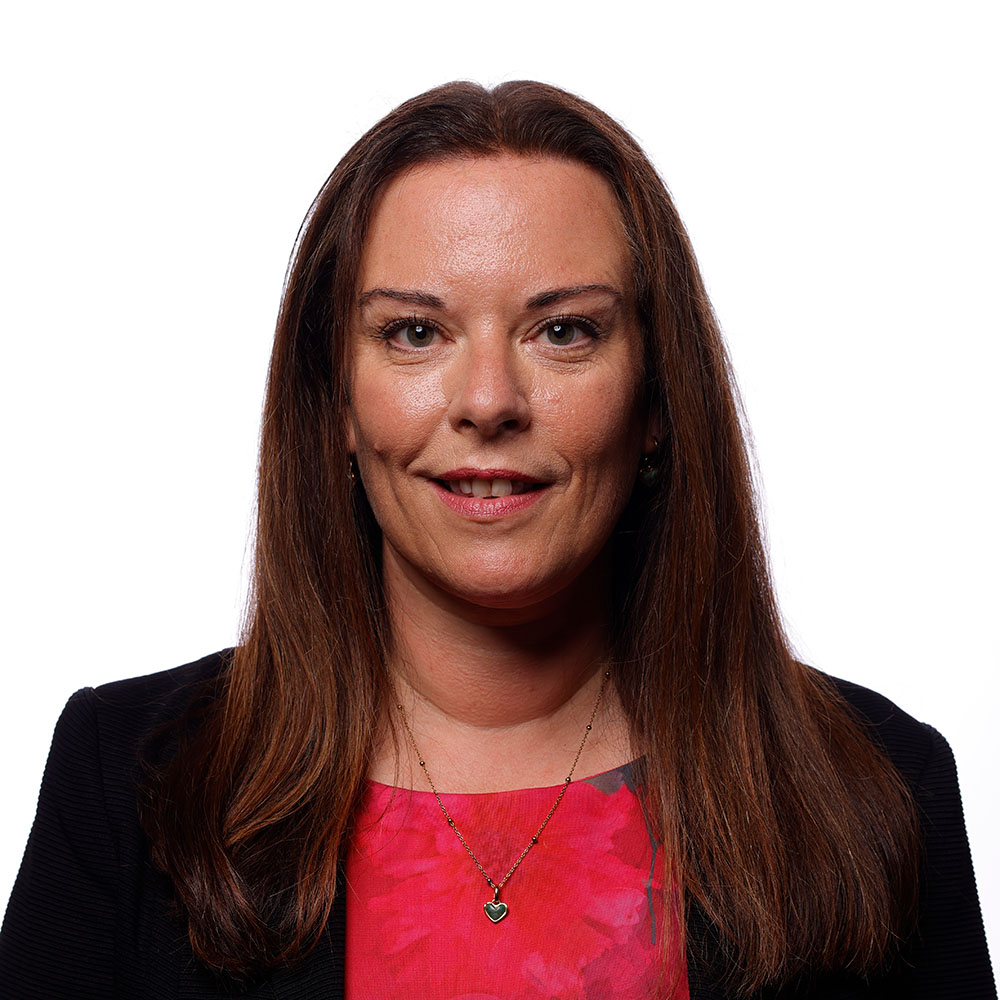
- Official portrait, 2026

Minister for Further and Higher Education
- In office 11 September 2024 – 12 May 2026
- First Minister: Eluned Morgan
- Preceded by: Office established

Member of the Senedd for Cynon Valley
- Incumbent
- Assumed office 6 May 2016
- Preceded by: Christine Chapman
- Majority: 7,468 (36.4%)

Personal details
- Citizenship: United Kingdom
- Party: Welsh Labour
- Education: St John the Baptist School, Aberdare
- Alma mater: University of Wales, Cardiff

Vikki Howells is a Welsh Labour and Co-operative politician. She is a Member of the Senedd, initially for Cynon Valley from 2016 to 2026, and then for Pontypridd Cynon Merthyr. She served as Minister for Further and Higher Education from September 2024 to May 2026. Before her election to the Senedd, Howells was a teacher, with a background in History.

== Background and personal life ==
Howells was brought up in Cwmbach, Rhondda Cynon Taf, Wales. She was educated at St John the Baptist School, a Church in Wales secondary school in Aberdare. She studied International and Welsh history at the University of Wales, Cardiff, and graduated with a Bachelor of Arts degree. She remained at Cardiff to undertake postgraduate study in Modern Welsh History, and graduated with a Master of Arts degree.

Her partner was Hefin David, former MS for the neighbouring Caerphilly constituency.

== Career ==
=== Teaching career ===
Before her election to the Senedd, Howells was a history teacher and the assistant head of sixth form at St Cenydd Comprehensive School in Caerphilly, South Wales.

=== Political career ===
Howells has been a Member of the Labour Party since she was 17. In December 2015, it was announced that Howells had been selected as the Welsh Labour candidate for the Cynon Valley constituency of the Senedd. On 5 May 2016, she was elected as a Member of the Welsh Assembly, she received 9,830 votes (51.1% of the votes cast, and a majority of 5,994). She was re-elected as a Labour and Co-operative Party candidate at the 2021 Senedd election with an increased majority of 7,468 votes.

Howells supported Vaughan Gething in the 2018 and February–March 2024 Welsh Labour leadership elections.

Howells chaired the Welsh Labour Group of MSs from 2017 to 2024. She is also president of the mental health charity Friends R Us and vice-president of Cwmbach Male Voice Choir. Vikki is also a member of the Cynon Valley History Society, the social justice thinktank the Bevan Foundation, the Co-operative Party, the GMB and USDAW.

Howells chaired the Senedd Standards of Conduct Committee between 2021 and 2024.

She was appointed as Minister for Further and Higher Education under First Minister Eluned Morgan in September 2024.

Senedd
Preceded by Christine Chapman	Member of the Senedd for Cynon Valley; 2016 to 2026	Succeeded by Constituency abolished
Preceded by Constituency created	Member of the Senedd for Pontypridd Cynon Merthyr; 2026 – present	Incumbent
