= St John the Baptist School, Aberdare =

Coordinates: 51.715°N 3.458°W

St John Baptist Church in Wales High School
- Ysgol Uwchradd Ioan Fedyddiwr

Location
- Glan Road; Aberdare, Rhondda Cynon Taf, CF44 8BW; Wales

Information
- Type: Secondary School; Voluntary Aided School
- Motto: Our future through faith
- Religious affiliation: Anglican
- Established: 1975
- Department for Education URN: 6744604 Tables
- Chair: Peter Godsall
- Head teacher: Jonathan Davies
- Gender: Mixed
- Age: 11 to 18
- Enrolment: 967 (2024)
- Houses: Deiniol (Red), Dewi (Green) , Ioan (Blue), Teilo (Yellow)
- Colours: Red and navy blue
- Budget: £5,355 per pupil
- Website: http://www.stjohnbaptist.co.uk

St. John Baptist Church in Wales High School is a church secondary school located in Aberdare, Wales. The school serves children from all over Rhondda Cynon Taf and surrounding counties. It opened in 1975.

== Building and Grounds ==
The school comprises several buildings, each with classrooms adjacent to the departments they serve. The school is commonly divided into two sections: the upper school and the lower school. However, this division does not correspond to the lower, middle, and upper year groups. The upper school, located on the western side of the building, includes several science labs, modern foreign languages, and mathematics. The lower school, on the eastern side of the building, houses all sporting facilities, religious studies classrooms, the English department, and IT facilities. The reception and offices are also located in the lower school. The building has expanded several times in recent years with the addition of new sporting facilities and new classrooms with elevators to cater for wheelchair users.

== Christianity and Worship ==
Christianity is a large part of the school life. Every year group attends a Eucharist service at least once per term. These services take place in the school hall, hosted by visiting priests from the diocese of Llandaff and surrounding dioceses, as well as in St Elvan's, a large church situated in Aberdare's town centre. St Elvan's is usually the host for whole-school services and major school events, such as the annual Prize Giving ceremony.

Notably, the school has welcomed iconic members of the Anglican Church through its doors. Rowan Williams, former archbishop of Canterbury, visited the school during 2012 after announcing that he intended to stand down as Archbishop that year. Dr Barry Morgan, Archbishop of Wales, also visited with Rowan Williams.

== Notable former and current pupils ==
- Alex Mann - Welsh Rugby Union player.
- Tom Bowen - Welsh Rugby Union player.
- Alice Griffiths - Welsh footballer.
- Rhys Jones, Paralympic sprinter for Team GB.
- Rhys Shellard - Welsh Rugby Union player.
- Vikki Howells - Welsh politician.
