= Vaughan Gething =

First Minister of Wales in 2024

The Right Honourable Vaughan Gething
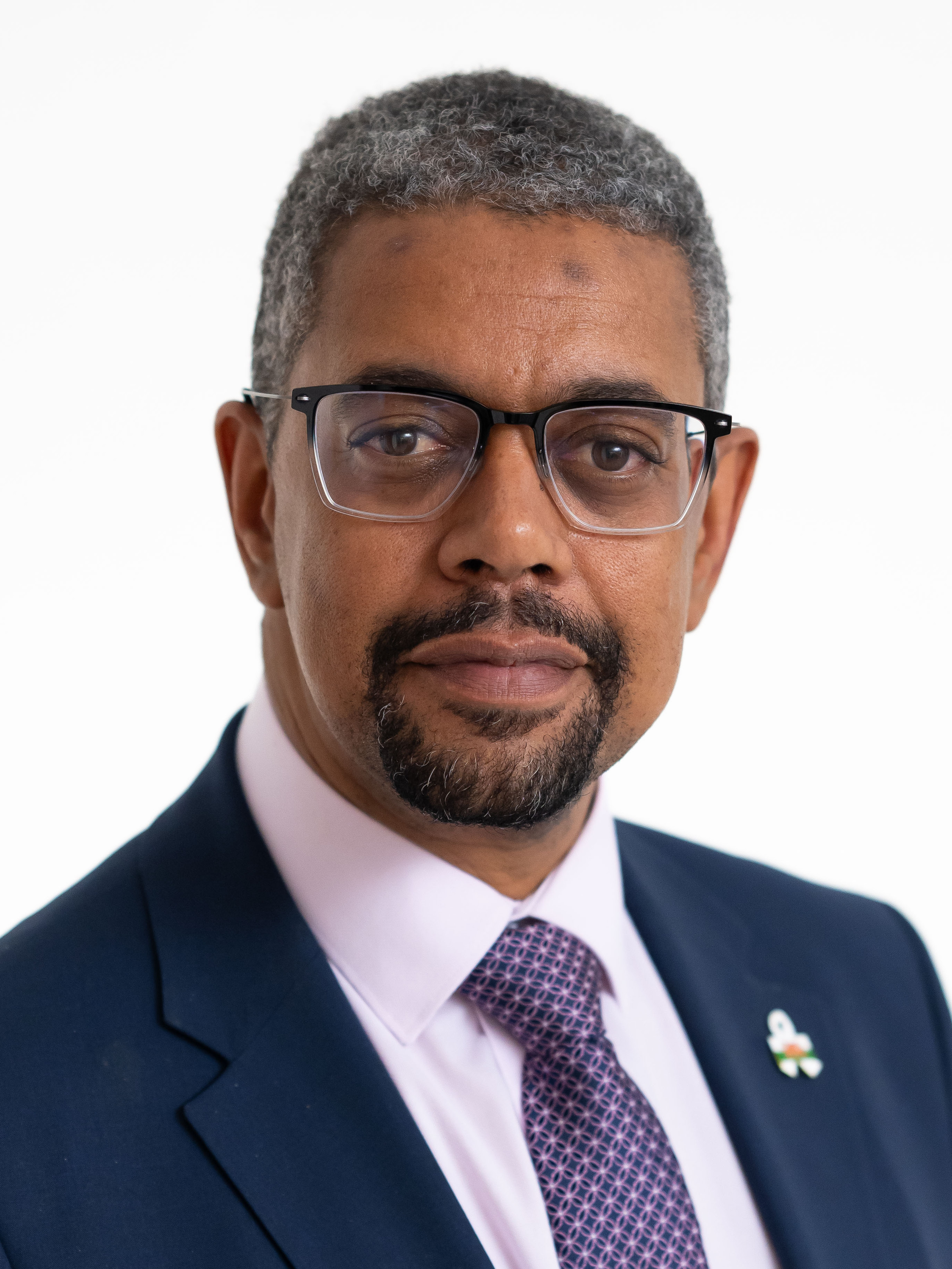
- Official portrait, 2024

First Minister of Wales
- In office 20 March 2024 – 5 August 2024
- Monarch: Charles III
- Preceded by: Mark Drakeford
- Succeeded by: Eluned Morgan

Leader of Welsh Labour
- In office 16 March 2024 – 24 July 2024
- Deputy: Carolyn Harris
- UK party leader: Keir Starmer
- Preceded by: Mark Drakeford
- Succeeded by: Eluned Morgan

Minister for the Economy
- In office 13 May 2021 – 20 March 2024
- First Minister: Mark Drakeford
- Preceded by: Ken Skates
- Succeeded by: Jeremy Miles

Minister for Health and Social Services
- In office 19 May 2016 – 13 May 2021
- First Minister: Carwyn Jones; Mark Drakeford
- Preceded by: Mark Drakeford
- Succeeded by: Eluned Morgan

Deputy Minister for Health
- In office 11 September 2014 – 19 May 2016
- First Minister: Carwyn Jones
- Minister: Mark Drakeford
- Preceded by: Office established
- Succeeded by: Rebecca Evans

Deputy Minister for Tackling Poverty
- In office 26 June 2013 – 11 September 2014
- First Minister: Carwyn Jones
- Minister: Jeffrey Cuthbert

Member of the Senedd for Cardiff South and Penarth
- In office 6 May 2011 – 7 April 2026
- Preceded by: Lorraine Barrett
- Majority: 10,606 (29.2%)

Personal details
- Born: 15 March 1974 (age 52) Lusaka, Zambia
- Party: Labour Co-op
- Spouse: Michelle Gething
- Children: 1
- Education: Aberystwyth University University of Cardiff
- Occupation: Solicitor, trade unionist

Humphrey Vaughan ap David Gething (born 15 March 1974) is a former Welsh Labour Co-op politician who served as First Minister of Wales from March to August 2024, and served as leader of Welsh Labour from March to July 2024, making him the first black leader of any European country. He was the Member of the Senedd (MS) for Cardiff South and Penarth between 2011 and 2026.

Gething was born in Zambia to a Welsh father and Zambian mother. He moved to Britain as a child and studied law at Aberystwyth University and Cardiff Law School, at Cardiff University. He trained as a solicitor with Cardiff-based firm Thompsons and subsequently specialised in employment law. Gething joined the Labour Party when he was 17 and contested Mid and West Wales for Labour in the inaugural elections to the National Assembly for Wales in 1999. He later represented Butetown electoral ward on Cardiff Council from 2004 to 2008.

Gething was elected to the Senedd at the 2011 National Assembly for Wales election, representing the Cardiff South and Penarth constituency. He was re-elected at the 2016 election and was subsequently appointed Minister for Health and Social Services in Mark Drakeford's government. His tenure notably included the COVID-19 pandemic in Wales. Gething subsequently served as Minister for the Economy from 2021 to 2024. Following Drakeford's resignation, he defeated Jeremy Miles in the Welsh Labour leadership election to become his successor in the party leadership and as First Minister of Wales.

Gething was sworn in as First Minister in March 2024. Less than two months into his term of office, allegations were raised that he had perjured himself at a COVID-19 inquiry by falsely denying that he had deleted text messages from his phone. In response, Plaid Cymru withdrew from its co-operation agreement with Labour and supported a non-confidence motion introduced by the Welsh Conservatives, which passed by two votes. Gething initially refused to resign, sparking a government crisis, but following a mass resignation of cabinet ministers in July 2024 announced his impending resignation. Eluned Morgan was elected unopposed as his successor and he formally resigned as First Minister in August 2024, making him the shortest-serving holder of the office. He stood down from the Senedd at the 2026 election.

== Early life ==
Humphrey Vaughan ap David Gething was born on 15 March 1974 in Lusaka, Zambia, where his father, a white Welsh veterinarian from Ogmore-by-Sea in Glamorgan, met his mother, who is a black Zambian and was working as a chicken farmer. Gething describes his father as "a white Welsh economic migrant". When he was two years old, he moved to Abergavenny in Monmouthshire, Wales, with his family, which also included three brothers and a sister. In Monmouthshire, his family experienced racism when an employer withdrew a job offer to Gething's father upon seeing the rest of his family. Speaking of the incident, Gething said: "They said, 'Come back with your family and we'll sign everything up', but he walked in with my mother, and a trail of brown boys, and the job offer got withdrawn". His father eventually found work in Dorset, England, where Gething was brought up.

Gething studied at Beaminster Comprehensive and Sixth Form in Dorset, followed by Aberystwyth University, where he graduated with a degree in Law in 1999; he then attended the University of Cardiff Law School, University of Wales. During his academic career, Gething became President of Aberystwyth University Guild of Students, as well as the first black president of the National Union of Students Wales.

== Professional career ==
Having completed his training as a solicitor with the trade union firm Thompsons in Cardiff in 2001, Gething chose to specialise in employment law. He became a partner in Thompsons in 2007.

In 2008, at the age of 34, Gething became the youngest President of Wales TUC, also becoming the first black person to serve in the role.

Following his departure from the Senedd after the 2026 election, Gething joined the board of N3XUS as a Non-Executive Director. The appointment marked his return to the private sector, where he provides strategic advice on sustainability, digital infrastructure, AI governance, green finance and international public-private partnerships.

== Political career ==
A video of Gething representing the First Minister in a COVID-19 press conference in January 2021

Gething joined the Labour Party when he was 17, to campaign in the 1992 UK general election. He contested Mid and West Wales for Labour in the inaugural elections to the National Assembly for Wales in 1999, but was not elected.

He served as a councillor from 2004 to 2008, representing Butetown electoral ward on Cardiff Council, having been elected with a majority of two votes over candidate Betty Campbell. Following the election, Campbell sent a complaint letter to Cardiff Council alleging that Gething had infringed election rules by handing out leaflets to voters as they entered polling stations and telling them how to vote. Campbell initially intended to have the vote re-examined in the High Court, but abandoned this because of the estimated cost of £12,000.

In the 2011 National Assembly for Wales election, Gething was selected as the Welsh Labour candidate for the Cardiff South and Penarth constituency in the Senedd, after Lorraine Barrett, who had represented Cardiff South and Penarth since the Senedd's creation in 1999, had stood down from her role. On 5 May 2011, Gething increased the Labour vote with a swing of 12.5%. At 13,814, his share of the vote was over 50%, giving him a majority of 6,259 over the Welsh Conservative Party candidate, Ben Gray, placed second. At the following 2016 election, Gething was re-elected.

Following the 2016 election, First Minister Carwyn Jones promoted Gething to the Welsh Cabinet, nominating him as Cabinet Secretary for Health, Well-being and Sport.

Gething did not support Jeremy Corbyn in either the 2015 or 2016 Labour Party leadership election against challenger Owen Smith; however, he stated in a 2017 BBC Radio Wales interview that he would still like to see Corbyn as prime minister, saying quote, "I want a Labour prime minister – and that means Jeremy Corbyn being prime minister. [...] I don't think it matters whether I'm a fan or not – it matters whether I think he can do the job in running the country".

In August 2017, Gething walked away in the middle of an interview on ITV Wales, when questioned by journalist James Crichton-Smith over his decision not to hold a public inquiry into Abertawe Bro Morgannwg University Health Board, following allegations that an employee had sexually assaulted vulnerable patients.

Gething, alongside Eluned Morgan and Mark Drakeford, was one of the three contenders in the 2018 election for the leadership of Welsh Labour, but was defeated by the latter candidate. Drakeford subsequently re-appointed Gething in the Welsh Cabinet, by nominating him as Health Minister, with the position renamed as Minister for Health and Social Services.

In January 2020, he criticised Corbyn and his failure to tackle antisemitism in the Labour Party. He endorsed Corbyn's successor Keir Starmer.

On 13 May 2021, Gething was appointed as new Minister for the Economy, replacing Ken Skates.

=== Minister for Health and management of the COVID-19 pandemic ===
Gething served as the Welsh Minister for Health and Social Services during the COVID-19 pandemic in 2020 and 2021.

On 12 March 2020, despite a steady surge in the number of confirmed COVID-19 cases in Wales and other sporting events getting cancelled, Gething resisted calls to postpone a rugby union match between Wales and Scotland at the Principality Stadium, which was due to be sold-out with 74,000 spectators. On the following day, the Welsh Rugby Union officially cancelled the match. Gething justified his decision in a BBC Radio Wales interview, saying "The medical advice about the risk to people going to the rugby didn't change. What did change was the fact that the rest of sporting world decided that, regardless of that advice, they wanted to put off events".

On 22 April 2020, Gething was caught swearing about fellow Labour MS Jenny Rathbone during a virtual session of the Senedd on Zoom. After Rathbone had asked the Minister a few questions about the Welsh Government's response to the COVID-19 pandemic, he failed to mute his microphone as he told an unknown person, "What the fuck is the matter with her?". Some undisclosed Labour MSs contacted by BBC Wales said they were also "very angry" over Gething's actions.

In May of the same year, Gething was reportedly photographed by a Sun reporter eating chips with his young son in a local park, prompting criticism by those who suggested he was breaking the COVID-19 restrictions he had imposed himself. Gething denied the accusations, and the Welsh Government stated nothing he had done contravened such regulations.

Gething was questioned at the COVID-19 Inquiry in July 2023, due to his former role as Wales' Minister for Health during the COVID-19 pandemic; in his deposition, he admitted that he had never read a report on Exercise Cygnus, a simulation exercise to estimate the impact of a hypothetical influenza pandemic on the UK population.

== First Minister of Wales (2024) ==
=== Labour leadership election ===
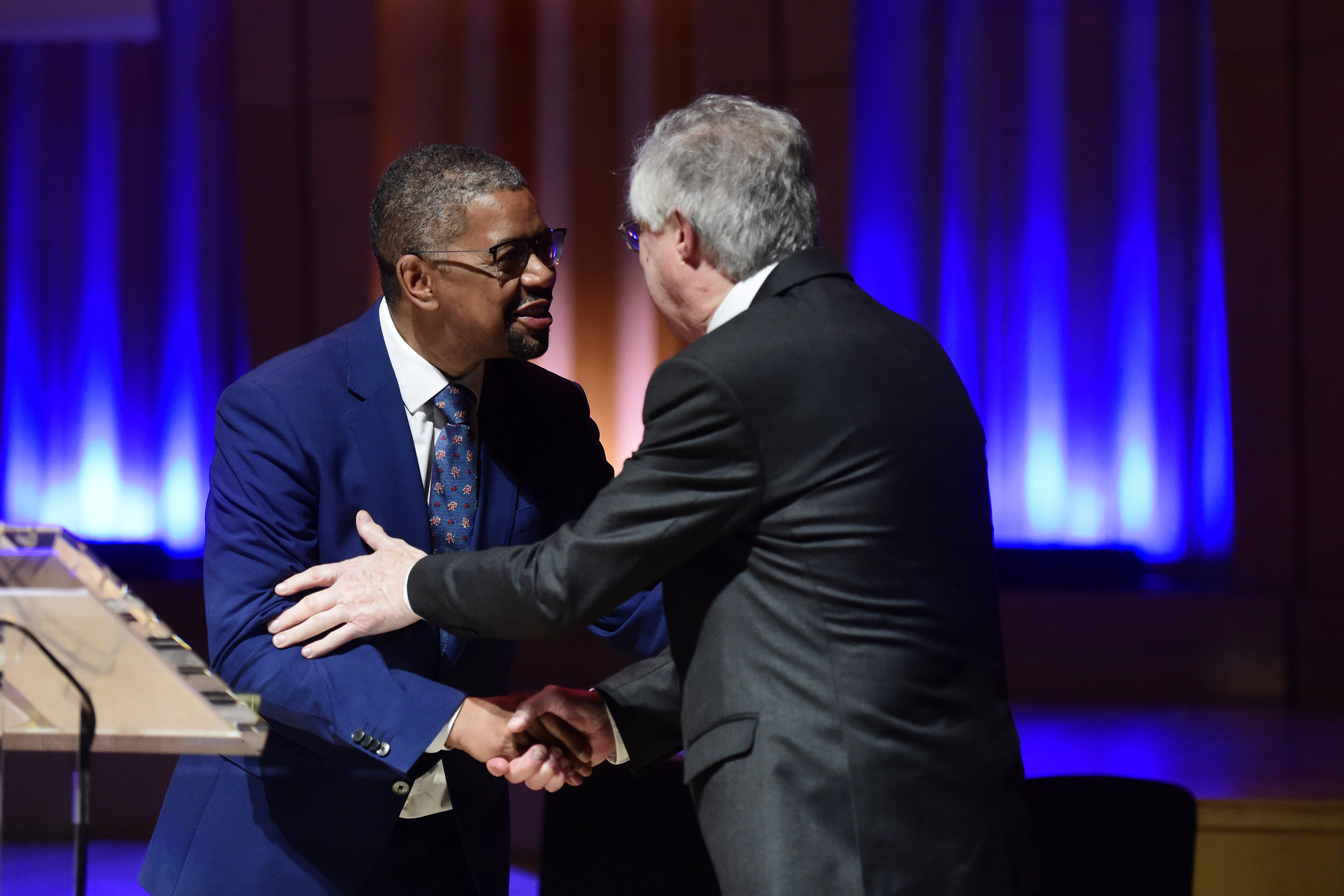
Gething with his predecessor Mark Drakeford in 2024

In December 2023, Gething became one of two candidates in the Welsh Labour leadership election to replace Drakeford as party leader and Wales' First Minister.

On 16 January, Gething and the other candidate, Jeremy Miles, took part in a hustings event to get the nomination from the trade union Unite. Miles' team were then informed of a rule requiring that only people who had been "lay officials" could be nominated. Gething therefore received the nomination. Miles claimed he was unfairly blocked from the union nomination. An unnamed Unite official was quoted by BBC News as saying that the nomination of Gething was a "shocking mess". Journalist Martin Shipton later uncovered that Gething had only joined Unite a few months beforehand.

On 16 March, Gething emerged victorious with 51.7% of the vote, thus becoming the leader of Welsh Labour.

=== Appointment ===
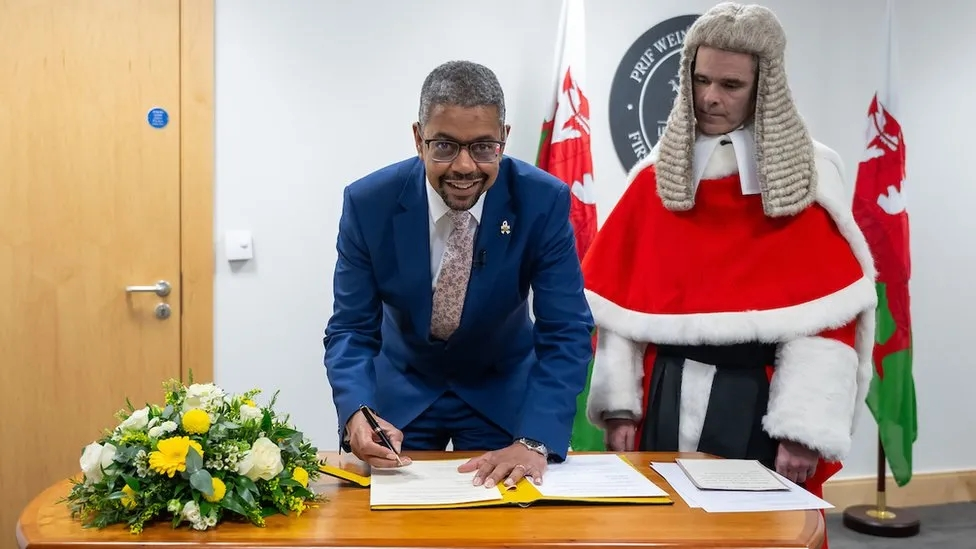
Gething being sworn in as first minister on 20 March 2024

Gething was officially nominated as First Minister by the Senedd on 20 March 2024, and presented his cabinet the following day. In the process, he became the first black First Minister of Wales, as well as the first black leader of any European country. He was appointed to the Privy Council on 28 March 2024 as part of the 2024 Special Honours. He was sworn in as a member of the privy council on 10 April 2024 at Buckingham Palace, entitling him to the honorific prefix "The Right Honourable" for life.

=== Government crisis and resignation ===
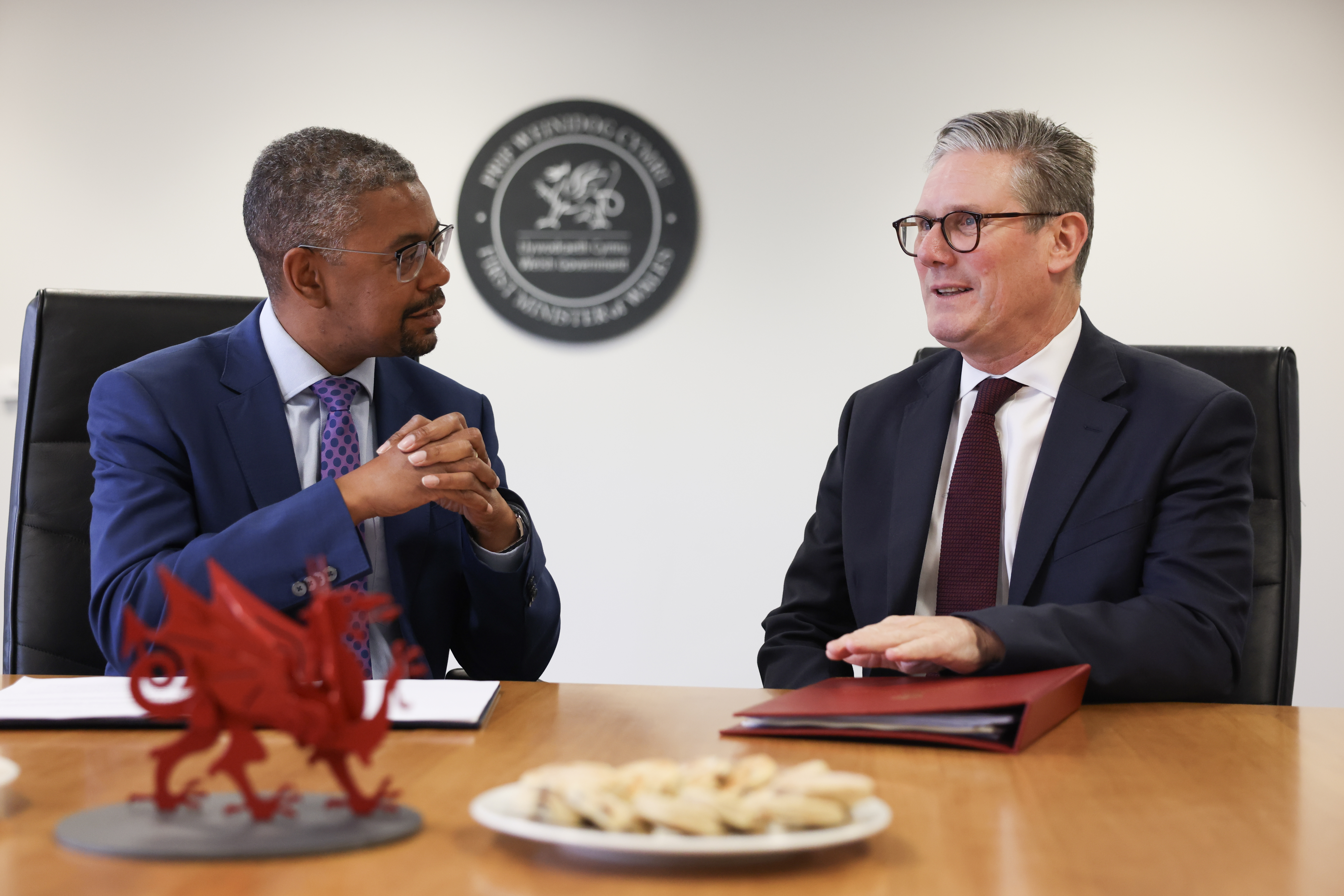
Gething with Keir Starmer, July 2024

During the inquiry into the COVID-19 pandemic response, Gething stated that he had not deliberately deleted any messages from his phone. On 7 May, Nation.Cymru obtained text messages from Gething in a Welsh Government group chat, in which he said "I'm deleting the messages in this group. They can be captured in an FOI [Freedom of Information request] and I think we are all in the right place on the choice being made." Gething denied allegations of perjury put to him by Rhun ap Iorwerth in First Minister's Questions the same day, describing the allegations as 'obnoxious'. A few days later, he removed Hannah Blythyn from her role as Minister for Social Partnership, alleging that she was the leak of the text messages. She denied this. Blythyn was replaced by Sarah Murphy on 17 May.

On 17 May, Plaid Cymru withdrew from the co-operation agreement with Welsh Labour. On 5 June, after just 78 days as First Minister, Gething faced a non-binding vote of no-confidence in him as First Minister, tabled by the Welsh Conservatives, in which he lost by a margin of 29 votes to 27. Gething at first refused to resign but did so on 16 July, an hour after ministers Mick Antoniw, Julie James, Lesley Griffiths and Jeremy Miles stepped down from their posts. His resignation took formal effect on 5 August, and he was succeeded by Eluned Morgan, Baroness Morgan of Ely, who had won the Welsh Labour leadership election the previous month. In the period between 16 July and 5 August he exercised the functions of the Counsel General for Wales, according to a Welsh Government press release, alongside the role of First Minister.

== Post-premiership (2024-present) ==
On 7 September 2024, Gething announced that he would not be seeking re-election to the Senedd in the next Senedd election.

In December 2025, it was reported that Keir Starmer intended to nominate Gething for a peerage as part of a group of 24 new Labour peers in the House of Lords. Covid-19 Bereaved Families for Justice Wales condemned the move as "deeply distressing", and it was met with similar outrage within Welsh Labour itself. Following this controversy, Gething was excluded from the list of appointees announced on 10 December. However, on 10 April 2026, sources within Labour revealed to Nation.Cymru that Starmer still intended to nominate Gething, but no announcement would be made until after the 2026 Senedd election for fear of further damaging Welsh Labour's chances.

In 2026, Gething joined N3XUS as a non-executive director. N3XUS is a technology company focused on artificial intelligence, sustainability infrastructure, and enterprise digital transformation.

== Personal life ==
Gething and his wife Michelle live in Penarth, where he has lived since 2011. They have one son.

Senedd
Preceded by Lorraine Barrett	Member of the Senedd for Cardiff South and Penarth; 2011–present	Incumbent
Political offices
Preceded by Gwenda Thomas	Deputy Minister for Health; 2014–2016	Succeeded by Rebecca Evans
Preceded by Mark Drakeford	Minister for Health and Social Services; 2016–2021	Succeeded by Eluned Morgan, Baroness Morgan of Ely
Preceded by Ken Skates	Minister for the Economy; 2021–2024	Succeeded by Jeremy Miles
Preceded by Mark Drakeford	First Minister of Wales; 2024	Succeeded by Eluned Morgan, Baroness Morgan of Ely
Trade union offices
Preceded by Ruth Jones	President of the Wales TUC; 2008–2009	Succeeded by Paul O'Sheay
