= Jeremy Miles =

Welsh politician (born 1971)

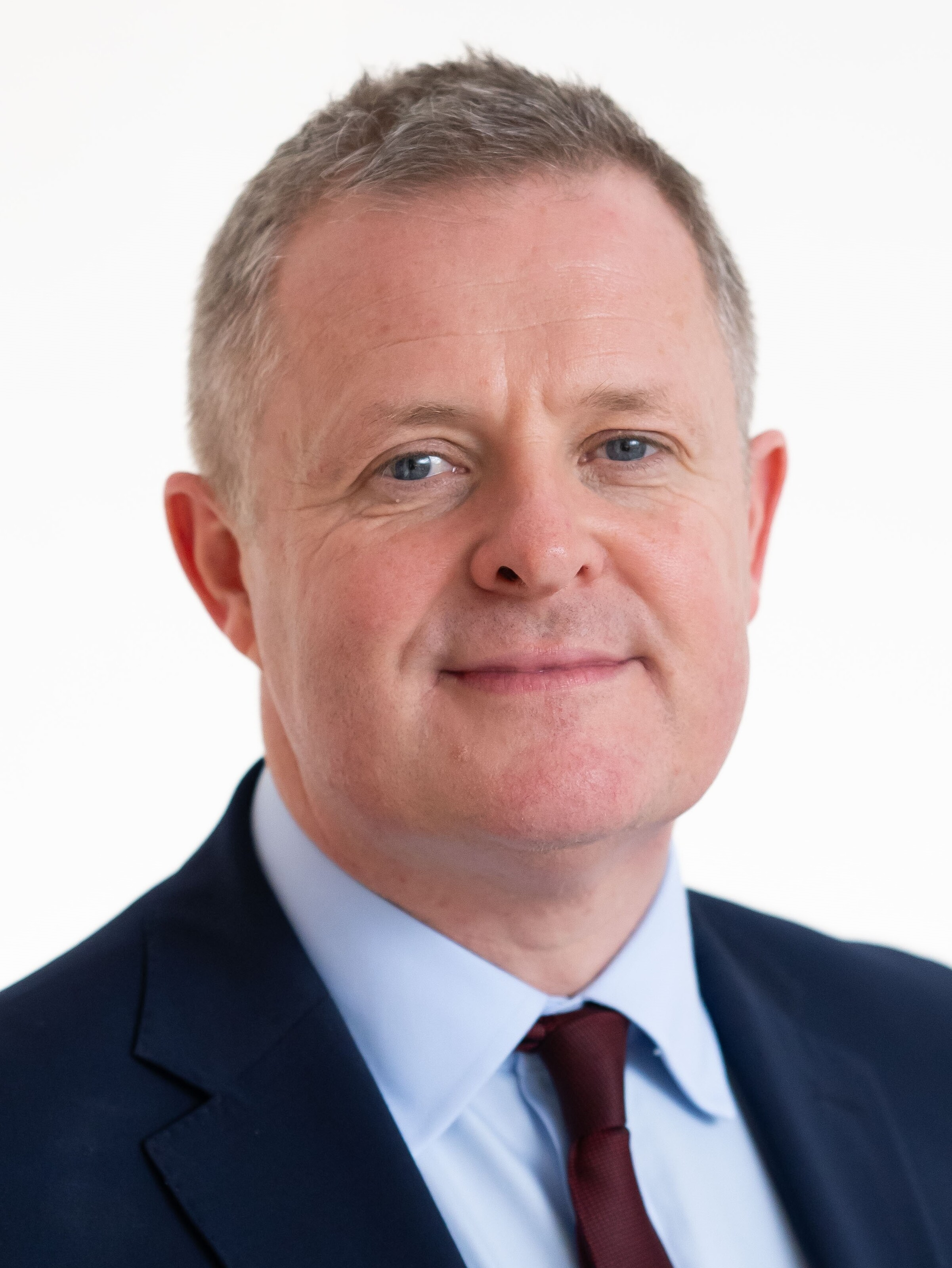
- Official portrait, 2024

Cabinet Secretary for Health and Social Care
- In office 11 September 2024 – 12 May 2026
- First Minister: Eluned Morgan
- Preceded by: Mark Drakeford
- Succeeded by: Mabon ap Gwynfor

Cabinet Secretary for Economy, Energy and Welsh Language
- In office 21 March 2024 – 16 July 2024
- First Minister: Vaughan Gething
- Preceded by: Vaughan Gething (Economy); Himself (Welsh Language)
- Succeeded by: Ken Skates (Economy)

Minister for Education and Welsh Language
- In office 13 May 2021 – 20 March 2024
- First Minister: Mark Drakeford
- Preceded by: Kirsty Williams (Education); Eluned Morgan (Welsh Language)
- Succeeded by: Lynne Neagle

Minister for European Transition
- In office 13 December 2018 – 13 May 2021
- First Minister: Mark Drakeford
- Preceded by: Mark Drakeford
- Succeeded by: Office abolished

Counsel General for Wales
- In office 16 November 2017 – 13 May 2021
- First Minister: Carwyn Jones; Mark Drakeford
- Preceded by: Mick Antoniw
- Succeeded by: Mick Antoniw

Member of the Senedd for Neath
- In office 6 May 2016 – 7 April 2026
- Preceded by: Gwenda Thomas
- Succeeded by: Seat abolished
- Majority: 5,221 (18.9%)

Personal details
- Born: August 1971 (age 55) Pontarddulais, Wales
- Party: Labour Co-op
- Education: New College, Oxford

Jeremy Miles (born August 1971) is a Welsh Labour Co-op politician who served as Cabinet Secretary for Health and Social Care in the Welsh Government from September 2024 to May 2026.

He previously served in the Welsh Government as Cabinet Secretary for Economy, Energy and Welsh Language from March to July 2024, Counsel General for Wales from 2017 to 2021, Brexit Minister from 2018 to 2021, and the Minister for coordinating Wales’ recovery from the COVID-19 pandemic from 2020 to 2021. Miles was the Member of the Senedd (MS) for Neath until 2026.

In December 2023 Miles became one of two candidates in the Welsh Labour leadership election to replace Mark Drakeford as party leader, losing to Vaughan Gething.

Miles did not seek re-election in the 2026 Senedd election.

== Early life ==
He was born and brought up in Pontarddulais, near Swansea, and, as a native Welsh speaker, was educated at a bilingual comprehensive school – Ysgol Gyfun Ystalyfera in the Swansea Valley. He graduated from New College, Oxford, where he read law. After graduating, he taught law at the Centre for English Legal Studies, Warsaw University.

He returned to the UK and practised as a solicitor in London initially, and then held senior legal and commercial posts in media sector businesses including ITV and with the US television network and film studio, NBCUniversal, based in London.

He stood unsuccessfully as the Labour candidate in the safe Conservative seat of Beaconsfield at the 2010 general election. Miles also stood in the Labour selection for Aberavon in 2014, losing the selection to Stephen Kinnock by one vote.

After returning to live in South Wales, he set up his own business affairs consultancy, working with international clients in the broadcast and digital sectors.

== Political career ==
=== Member of the Senedd for Neath ===
Following the announcement by Gwenda Thomas, the then-Assembly Member for Neath, that she was planning to stand down at the 2016 National Assembly for Wales election, he was selected to stand as the Labour and Co-operative candidate in Neath constituency in October 2015, following a twinned selection process with Gower constituency.

He was until his selection as the candidate for Neath a trustee and secretary of the social justice charity the Bevan Foundation.

He was elected to the Senedd in May 2016 and was one of the first out gay MSs elected. In November 2017, he was nominated to be the Counsel General for Wales. Before his appointment to government, he sat on the Economy, Skills and Infrastructure committee, Culture, Welsh Language and Communications committee and the External Affairs committee and was the chair of the Co-operative group of AMs.

=== Counsel General for Wales (2017–2021), Minister for European Transition (2018–2021) ===
In November 2017, First Minister of Wales Carwyn Jones undertook a Welsh Government reshuffle. Miles was nominated to the cabinet-level role of Counsel General.

In March 2018, he introduced draft legislation that would create a codified statute book of Welsh law, which would make Wales the first of the home nations to organise its laws in this way. The statute book would be designed to improve accessibility to Welsh Law for both lawyers and the general population.

In 2019, he led for the Welsh Government in taking legislation through the Senedd which for the first time introduced votes for 16 year olds in Senedd elections. The subsequent 2021 Senedd election was the first election that 16 year olds in Wales could vote.

In his role as Counsel General he announced in 2019 his decision that the Welsh Government would join the case brought by Gina Miller against the UK Conservative Government in the Supreme Court, arguing that the Conservative government acted unconstitutionally in proroguing Parliament and denying the Senedd the opportunity to influence the course of Brexit. The case was successful and the Supreme Court ruled that Boris Johnson had acted unlawfully.

In July 2020 he issued a joint statement with Jane Hutt, equalities minister on the human rights of the trans community and confirming the Welsh Government’s support for equal rights for trans people.

He brought another legal case against the Conservative Government in 2021 over the Internal Market Act which gave the UK Government sweeping new powers in devolved areas, arguing that the UK Government was “stealing powers from devolved governments” and that the Act was “an attack on democracy and an affront to the people of Wales”.

As Minister for European Transition he led the co-ordination of the Welsh Government’s activities to prepare Wales for the UK’s departure from the European Union, for was also responsible for liaising with the UK Government over Britain’s negotiations to leave the EU and he represented the Welsh Government in negotiations with the UK Government and other devolved governments for the Intergovernmental Relations Review, to strengthen Wales’ voice in intergovernmental relations. In May 2019 he argued for a change in the Welsh Government’s policy so that it would support another Brexit referendum, and that the UK Government had failed to deliver a deal with the EU based on promises made in the first referendum.

During the Covid pandemic he was also tasked with post-Covid planning. He convened a series of experts to guide Wales’ longer-term planning which included Gordon Brown and launched a national conversation through the “Our Future Wales” campaign where the public could email proposals to be considered by the government, based on their Covid experiences. This led to the publication of a post-Covid priorities plan in October 2020.

=== 2024 leadership election ===
In December 2023, following the resignation of Mark Drakeford, Miles stood (along with Vaughan Gething) for the election to succeed him as both party leader and therefore First Minister of Wales.

In July 2024, Miles resigned from the Welsh Cabinet, alongside three other cabinet members, from First Minister Vaughan Gething's government, prompting Gething's subsequent resignation as First Minister.

In September 2024, Gething's successor as first minister, Eluned Morgan, appointed Miles as Cabinet Secretary for Health and Social Care, returning Miles to cabinet.

== In the news ==
In August 2016, he warned that public disillusionment with politics could threaten devolution in Wales. He expanded on this in an essay for Western Mail where he warned "if we assume the only choice is between complacency and immediate disaster, then we will fail to learn the lessons of Brexit".

In 2016, he entered the Pinc List: The 40 most influential lesbian, gay, bisexual and trans people in Wales for the first time. and was named again on the 2017 Pinc List.

In March 2018, he wrote an article for the Fabian Society in Wales, setting out challenges for the country and seeking to kick-start a debate on the future of Welsh Labour under a new leader. Soon after, he nominated and endorsed Mark Drakeford in the election to succeed Carwyn Jones as Party leader and First Minister.

== Other activities ==
Miles is gay, a member of the Co-operative Party and was elected chair of the Co-operative Group of Senedd Members in 2016. He is also a member of the GMB and Unite trade unions. He is a former member of the Blairite group Progress.

Prior to being elected, he had volunteered as a youth mentor with the Young Foundation, and also as an adviser at free legal advice centres. He was an adviser to the Use Your Vote campaign for the 2010 general election. His stated political interests include economic and community development, skills, co-ops and mutuals.

He lives in the Swansea Valley and enjoys watching films, reading, cooking, hiking and cycling and following local rugby.
