= February–March 2024 Welsh Labour leadership election =

- 16 February – 16 March 2024
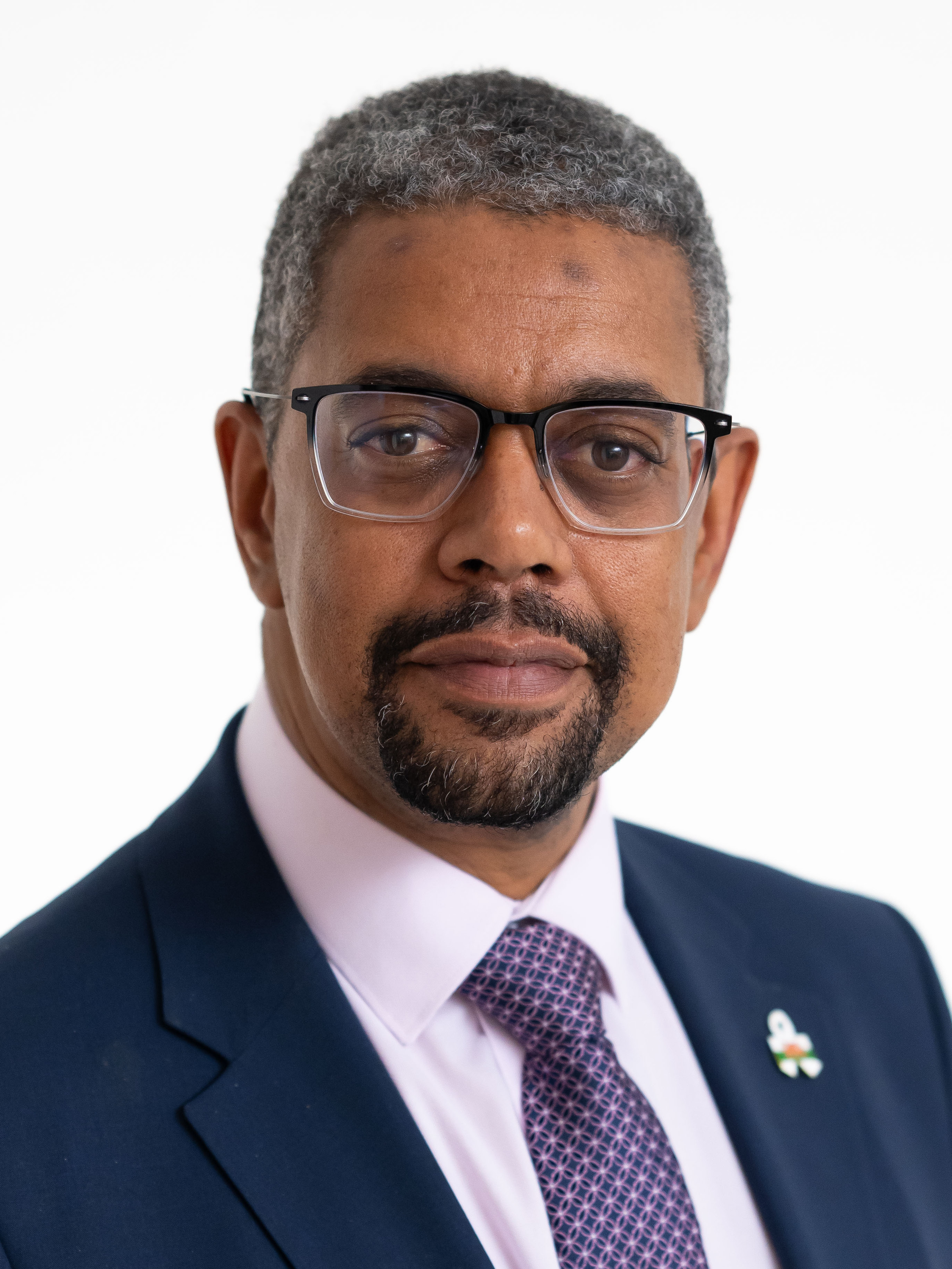

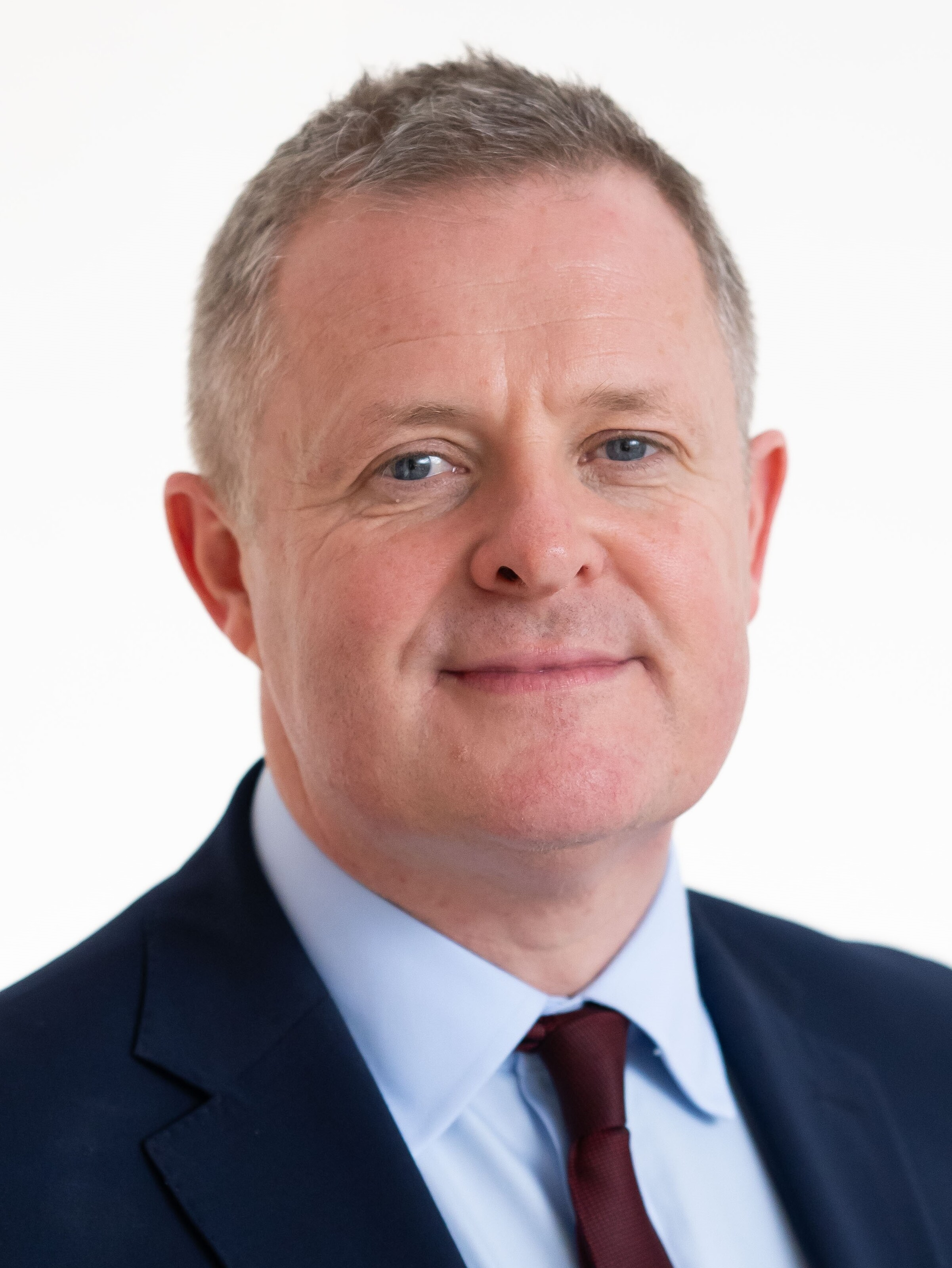
Candidate	Vaughan Gething	Jeremy Miles
Percentage	51.7%	48.3%
Leader before election
Mark Drakeford
Elected Leader
Vaughan Gething

The February–March 2024 Welsh Labour leadership election took place to select Mark Drakeford's successor as leader of Welsh Labour, who in turn would become First Minister of Wales. Drakeford announced his resignation and retirement on 13 December 2023, five years after his election. Voting began in February 2024 with the new leader announced on 16 March 2024. Vaughan Gething won the election with 51.7% of the vote. The next scheduled Senedd election had to be held on or before 7 May 2026.

Gething was the first black First Minister of Wales and the first black leader of any country in Europe. At the time of Gething's victory, three of the four governments in the UK had a non-white leader. Gething remained in office as first minister and party leader for less than five months, after a government crisis which followed allegations of perjury and resulted in his loss of a non-confidence motion. His resignation in July 2024 sparked a second Welsh Labour leadership ballot which saw Eluned Morgan elected unopposed as his successor.

== Background ==
In his leadership election in 2018, and several times subsequently, Mark Drakeford said he would leave the role midway through the Senedd term, sometimes specifically saying he expected to leave in 2024.

On 9 August 2023, Drakeford said he will leave the Welsh parliament at the next election, but refused to be drawn on at what point before 2026 he would quit as first minister. In October 2023 Drakeford confirmed he would stand down "...some time in the next calendar year" but again refused to be drawn on exactly when.

On 13 December 2023, Drakeford announced his intention to resign as Welsh Labour Leader by March 2024, with the leadership election to begin shortly after his December announcement. He denied that the timing was related to criticism he and his government had received for its expansion of 20 mph zones as a default for residential areas.

== Timeline ==
The timeline for the election was discussed by the Welsh Executive Committee on 13 December 2023 and announced on 16 December. Nominations were open from 18 December 2023 and ended for MSs on 21 December and for party affiliates and Constituency Labour Parties (CLPs) on 29 January 2024. The final candidates were confirmed later that day, with hustings beginning from 30 January and lasting until 21 February. Voting was open from 16 February until 14 March, with the winning candidate announced on 16 March.

Candidates were required to be serving MS and required 20% of current Labour MSs (six including themselves) to nominate them. Alternately, a candidate could be nominated with three MSs in addition to three party affiliates including two trade unions, or by three MSs in addition to 20% of CLPs in Wales.

== Campaign ==
The race to succeed Drakeford as First Minister of Wales has been overshadowed by controversy surrounding campaign finance. The Institute of Welsh Affairs reported that campaign issues would include the Welsh NHS, the climate, constitutional and democratic reform, economic issues, and the party's relationship to the wider UK Labour Party.

Various candidates were expected to put themselves forward in the election. Media speculation considered the economy minister Vaughan Gething, the education minister Jeremy Miles, the health minister Eluned Morgan, and deputy minister for social partnership Hannah Blythyn, to be the most likely candidates to stand. Morgan ruled out standing on 15 December, saying she wanted to focus on her ministerial work. Blythyn ruled out standing on 15 December thanking the support that was extended to her from the Labour movement, before backing Miles. Gething announced his candidacy on 14 December. Gething has served as an MS for Cardiff South and Penarth since 2011, as health minister from 2016 to 2021 and as economy minister since 2021. He previously stood for the leadership of Welsh Labour in 2018 against Drakeford. Gething would be the first black leader of a country in Europe. Miles announced his candidacy on 18 December, with the support of more than half of Labour MSs. Miles has served as the MS for Neath since 2016, as counsel general from 2017 and Brexit minister from 2018, both to 2021 and as education and Welsh language minister since 2021.

On the economy, both candidates propose investing in sustainable industry to create jobs and growth. Gething said he would create a "fair work fund" to support "better working practices". Miles promised to establish an economic council to advise the Welsh Government and provide "financial incentives for recent graduates to stay in" Wales.

On healthcare, both candidates supported the establishment of a national care service. Gething said he would maintain NHS spending in Wales to ensure it was the same or higher per person as in England and would consult patients, staff and trade unions about how to improve performance. He said he would "establish a women's health plan". Miles said he would increase Welsh government spending on health and education, with a focus on reducing NHS waiting times including by starting "dedicated orthopaedic centres for knee and hip replacements". Gething said that specialist centres described by Miles were already being opened. Miles pledged to improve accountability and "fast-track reform and rebuild trust" in Betsi Cadwaladr University Health Board.

On education, Miles said he would increase Welsh government spending and provide "free Welsh lessons for parents whose children attend Welsh-medium school". Plaid Cymru and the Conservatives criticised him for pledging to increase the education budget he cut as the minister responsible. Gething said he wanted to increase provision of free childcare.

On housing and the environment, both candidates proposed the establishment of an "environmental governance body". Gething promised a housing retrofitting programme to reduce carbon emissions while Miles proposed a new rent-to-own housing scheme. Miles expressed support for a Welsh government policy that would provide a subsidy to farmers who plant trees on 10% of their land and set aside 10% as habitats for wildlife, while Gething suggested that the requirements could be relaxed.

Miles said he would immediately begin a review of the implementation of the expansion of 20 mph zones, but would not reverse the policy overall. Gething said that the policy had not been communicated well but that he would not reverse it. He said that public consultation would be part of the review of the policy.

Miles also wanted powers over "crime, justice and benefits" to be devolved to Wales and promised to phase out greyhound racing and proposed a review of dog licences.

On 21 February 2024, it was revealed that Gething took £200,000 for his campaign from a twice convicted businessman. On 12 March, it was shown that Gething had lobbied regulators in support of the businessman's company, which has been prosecuted for waste crimes. After the election, Gething has refused to return the £200,000 donation.

== Candidates ==
=== Declared ===
Candidate	Political office	Campaign	Date declared	Nominations	Ref.
Vaughan Gething	Health and social services minister (2016–2021); Economy minister (2021–present); MS for Cardiff South and Penarth (2011–present)	Website	14 December 2023	11 / 30 36.7% Nominations: Dawn Bowden; Jayne Bryant; Hefin David; Rebecca Evans; Eluned Morgan; Lynne Neagle; Vikki Howells; Jack Sargeant; Ken Skates; Joyce Watson	
Jeremy Miles	European transition minister (2018–2021); Counsel General (2017–2021); Education and Welsh language minister (2021–present); MS for Neath (2016–present)	Website	18 December 2023	17 / 30 56.7% Nominations: Mick Antoniw; Hannah Blythyn; Alun Davies; John Griffiths; Lesley Griffiths; Mike Hedges; Huw Irranca-Davies; Julie James; Julie Morgan; Sarah Murphy; Rhianon Passmore; Jenny Rathbone; David Rees; Carolyn Thomas; Lee Waters; Buffy Williams	

Mark Drakeford and Jane Hutt (Chief Whip) were not supporting any candidate due to their positions.

=== Declined ===
The following MSs said they did not seek election:

- Mick Antoniw, counsel general (endorsed Miles)
- Hannah Blythyn, social partnership deputy minister (endorsed Miles)
- Rebecca Evans, finance and local government minister (endorsed Gething)
- Lesley Griffiths, rural affairs minister (endorsed Miles)
- Julie James, climate change minister (endorsed Miles)
- Eluned Morgan, health and social services minister (endorsed Gething)

== Nominations, supporting nominations and endorsements ==
Candidates required nominations by at least six MSs, including themselves, or at least three MSs and three party affiliates including two trades unions, or at least three MSs and at least 20% of Constituency Labour Parties (CLPs). They could receive official supporting nominations from MPs, council leaders and peers. Other notable figures and organisations that endorsed leadership candidates with no bearing on nomination are listed below.

=== Vaughan Gething ===
==== Nominations ====
Gething was nominated by nine affiliated groups including six trades unions.

- Community
- Communication Workers Union
- GMB
- Jewish Labour Movement
- Labour Campaign for International Development
- Labour Movement for Europe
- Union of Shop, Distributive and Allied Workers
- Unison
- Unite the Union

Gething was nominated by fourteen Constituency Labour Parties.

- Brecon, Radnor and Cwm Tawe
- Bridgend
- Caerphilly
- Caerfyrddin
- Cardiff East
- Cardiff South and Penarth
- Llanelli
- Merthyr Tydfil and Aberdare
- Mid and South Pembrokeshire
- Monmouthshire
- Newport East
- Newport West and Islwyn
- Torfaen
- Ynys Môn

==== Supporting nominations ====
Gething received supporting nominations from eleven MPs.

- Chris Bryant, MP for Rhondda
- Wayne David, MP for Caerphilly
- Stephen Doughty, MP for Cardiff South and Penarth
- Chris Elmore, MP for Ogmore
- Gerald Jones, MP for Merthyr Tydfil
- Ruth Jones, MP for Newport West
- Nia Griffith, MP for Llanelli
- Stephen Kinnock, MP for Aberavon
- Jessica Morden, MP for Newport East
- Mark Tami, MP for Alyn and Deeside
- Nick Thomas-Symonds, MP for Torfaen

Gething received supporting nominations from three peers.

- Neil Kinnock, peer and former leader of the Labour Party
- Paul Murphy, peer
- Don Touhig, peer

Gething received supporting nominations from ten local government group leaders.

- Huw David, leader of Bridgend County Borough Council
- Dana Davies, leader of the Labour group in Wrexham County Borough Council
- Matthew Dorrance, leader of the Labour group in Powys County Council
- Glen Haynes, leader of the Labour group in Isle of Anglesey County Council
- Anthony Hunt, leader of Torfaen County Borough Council
- Rob Jones, leader of the Labour group in Neath Port Talbot County Borough Council
- Paul Miller, leader of the Labour group in Pembrokeshire County Council
- Darren Roberts, leader of the Labour group in Merthyr Tydfil County Borough Council
- Huw Thomas, leader of Cardiff Council
- Stephen Thomas, leader of Blaenau Gwent County Borough Council

==== Endorsements ====
- Jeffrey Cuthbert, PCC for Gwent

=== Jeremy Miles ===
==== Nominations ====
Miles was nominated by eight affiliated groups including three trades unions.

- Associated Society of Locomotive Engineers and Firemen
- Co-operative Party
- Disability Labour
- Musicians' Union
- National Union of Mineworkers
- Socialist Educational Association
- Socialist Environment and Resources Association
- Socialist Health Association

Miles was nominated by fifteen Constituency Labour Parties.

- Aberafan Maesteg
- Alyn and Deeside
- Bangor Aberconwy
- Cardiff North
- Ceredigion Preseli
- Clwyd East
- Clwyd North
- Gower
- Montgomeryshire and Glyndŵr
- Neath and Swansea East
- Pontypridd
- Rhondda and Ogmore
- Swansea West
- Vale of Glamorgan
- Wrexham

==== Supporting nominations ====
Miles received a supporting nomination from one MP.

- Alex Davies-Jones, MP for Pontypridd

Miles received supporting nominations from four peers.

- Anita Gale
- Leslie Griffiths
- Peter Hain
- Debbie Wilcox

Miles received supporting nominations from six local government group leaders.

- Mary Ann Brocklesby, leader of Monmouthshire County Council
- Lis Burnett, leader of Vale of Glamorgan Council
- Jason Mclellan, leader of Denbighshire County Council
- Andrew Morgan, leader of Rhondda Cynon Taf County Borough Council
- Jane Mudd, leader of Newport City Council
- Ian Roberts, leader of Flintshire County Council

==== Endorsements ====
- Max Boyce, musician
- Jackie Jones, former MEP for Wales and then prospective parliamentary candidate for Ceredigion Preseli
- Anna McMorrin, MP for Cardiff North

== Debates ==
No.	Date and time	Location	Programme	Broadcaster	Presenter(s)	Candidates		Ref.
P Participant N No debate						Gething	Miles	Ref.
1	21 Feb 2024, 9:00 pm	Cardiff	BBC Wales Live: Welsh Labour Leadership Debate	BBC One Wales	Bethan Rhys Roberts	P	P	

== Opinion polling ==
=== Welsh public ===
Dates conducted	Pollster	Client	Sample size	Jeremy Miles	Vaughan Gething	Mick Antoniw	Hannah Blythyn	Eluned Morgan	Ken Skates	Don't Know	Other
18 February 2024	Redfield and Wilton	N/A	874	11%	27%	–	–	–	–	38%	23%
24 Jan – 6 Feb 2024	More In Common	ITV Wales	1,000	17%	20%	–	–	–	–	62%	–
24 – 26 January 2024	Redfield and Wilton	N/A	1,100	10%	27%	–	–	–	–	40%	24%
13 December 2023	Mark Drakeford announces his intention to resign as First Minister of Wales										
10 – 11 December 2023	Redfield and Wilton	WalesOnline	1,086	6%	16%	–	–	13%	–	46%	19%
4 – 7 December 2023	YouGov	ITV Wales / Cardiff University	1,004	3%	11%	1%	1%	3%	1%	72%	8%

== Results ==
Candidate	Affiliated members	Individual members	Total
Vaughan Gething MS	52.7%	50.7%	51.7%
Jeremy Miles MS	47.3%	49.3%	48.3%

Source: BBC News
