= Mark Drakeford =

First Minister of Wales from 2018 to 2024

The Right Honourable Mark Drakeford
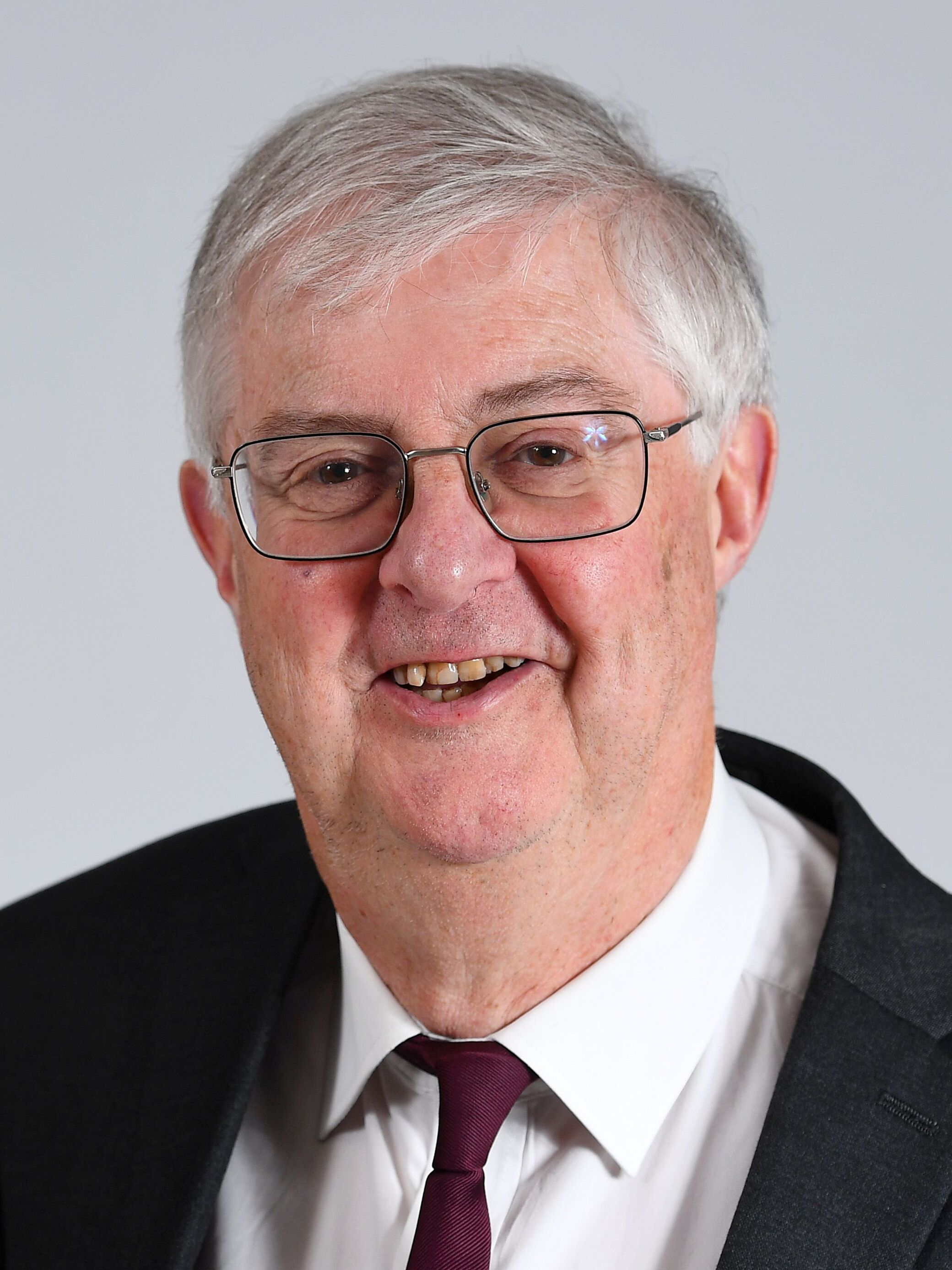
- Official portrait, 2024

First Minister of Wales
- In office 13 December 2018 – 20 March 2024
- Monarchs: Elizabeth II; Charles III
- Preceded by: Carwyn Jones
- Succeeded by: Vaughan Gething

Leader of Welsh Labour
- In office 6 December 2018 – 16 March 2024
- Deputy: Carolyn Harris
- UK party leader: Jeremy Corbyn; Keir Starmer
- Preceded by: Carwyn Jones
- Succeeded by: Vaughan Gething
Ministerial offices
Cabinet Secretary for Finance and Welsh Language (Note: As Cabinet Secretary for Finance between 2016 and 2018)
In office 11 September 2024 – 12 May 2026
First Minister	Eluned Morgan
Preceded by	Rebecca Evans
Succeeded by	Elin Jones (Finance); Anna Brychan (Welsh Language)
In office 19 May 2016 – 13 December 2018
First Minister	Carwyn Jones
Preceded by	Jane Hutt
Succeeded by	Rebecca Evans
Cabinet Secretary for Health and Social Care (Note: As Minister for Health and Social Services from 2013 to 2016)
Interim; 6 August 2024 – 11 September 2024
First Minister	Eluned Morgan
Preceded by	Eluned Morgan
Succeeded by	Jeremy Miles
In office 14 March 2013 – 19 May 2016
First Minister	Carwyn Jones
Deputy	Vaughan Gething
Preceded by	Lesley Griffiths
Succeeded by	Vaughan Gething
Minister for Brexit
In office 3 November 2017 – 13 December 2018
First Minister	Carwyn Jones
Preceded by	Office established
Succeeded by	Jeremy Miles

Member of the Senedd for Cardiff West
- In office 5 May 2011 – 7 April 2026
- Preceded by: Rhodri Morgan
- Majority: 11,211 (30.7%)

Personal details
- Born: 19 September 1954 (age 72) Carmarthen, Carmarthenshire, Wales
- Party: Labour
- Spouse: Clare Buckle (m. 1977; died 2023)
- Children: 3
- Education: University of Kent (BA Latin); University of Exeter (B.Phil.) (PhD)
- Cabinet: Second Drakeford government
- Mark Drakeford's voice Drakeford announces measures against the COVID-19 pandemic Recorded 23 March 2020

Mark Drakeford (born 19 September 1954) is a Welsh former politician who served as First Minister of Wales and Leader of Welsh Labour from 2018 to 2024. He also served as Cabinet Secretary for Finance from 2016 to 2018 and again from 2024 to 2026, as well as Cabinet Secretary for Health and Social Care from 2013 to 2016, (Note: As Minister for Health and Social Services) and on an interim basis in 2024. He served as the Member of the Senedd (MS) for Cardiff West in 2011 until 2026, when he stood down. He is considered to be on the soft left of Labour.

Drakeford was born in Carmarthen in West Wales. He studied Latin at the University of Kent and the University of Exeter. He was a lecturer at the University College of Swansea from 1991 to 1995 and at Cardiff University from 1995 to 1999. He was a professor of Social Policy and Applied Social Sciences at Cardiff University from 2003 to 2013. Drakeford was elected at the 2011 National Assembly for Wales election for Cardiff West. In 2013, First Minister Carwyn Jones appointed Drakeford to the Welsh Government as Minister for Health and Social Services. He served as Cabinet Secretary for Finance from 2016 to 2018 and as Minister for Brexit from 2017 to 2018. In 2018, he was elected to succeed Jones as Welsh Labour Leader and First Minister.

He led the Welsh Government’s response to the COVID-19 pandemic. In the 2021 Senedd election, Drakeford led Welsh Labour to win 30 seats, a working majority, and was reappointed as First Minister. Drakeford resigned as Welsh Labour Leader and First Minister in March 2024 and was succeeded by his Health Minister Vaughan Gething. Drakeford spent the duration of Gething's premiership on the backbenches before making a return to government as Cabinet Secretary for Health and Social Care under First Minister Eluned Morgan in August 2024.

== Early life and education ==
Mark Drakeford was born on 19 September 1954 in Carmarthenshire, West Wales, where he was brought up. His formative years were spent in a politically engaged environment, with Drakeford later remembering that in school 'people marched around the playground chanting about politics'. The election of Gwynfor Evans as the first Plaid Cymru MP happened in Carmarthen at the time Drakeford was in school. He has stated that he decided early on that he was a socialist not a nationalist.

His political consciousness developed early, and by the age of 14, Drakeford had become a republican, a conviction that remained with him throughout his political career.

He was educated at Queen Elizabeth Grammar School, then an all-boys grammar school in Carmarthen. He went on to study Latin at the University of Kent, before gaining a B.Phil. from the University of Exeter and returning to Wales to complete a PhD.

=== Early career and social work ===
After university, Drakeford trained both as a teacher and as a social worker. He moved to Cardiff in 1979 and worked as a probation officer and youth justice worker until 1991.

Drakeford served as a Barnardo's project leader in the Ely and Caerau areas of Cardiff. During the 1980s, Ely faced significant social deprivation, with unemployment exceeding 30% and high levels of crime.

His experiences working with homeless young people led him to help establish Llamau, a Welsh youth homelessness charity, in 1986. The charity has since supported over 100,000 young people facing homelessness.

== Academic career ==
From 1991 to 1995, Drakeford was a lecturer in applied social studies at the University College of Swansea (now Swansea University). He then moved to the University of Wales, Cardiff, renamed as Cardiff University in 1999, as a lecturer in its School of Social and Administrative Studies. He was promoted to senior lecturer in 1999 and appointed as Professor of Social Policy and Applied Social Sciences in 2003. Drakeford continued in his academic posts until his appointment as a Welsh Government minister in 2013. He has published books and journal articles on various aspects of social policy.

During his academic career, Drakeford authored and co-authored numerous publications on social welfare policy. Notable works included "Scandal, Social Work and Social Welfare" (2005) with Ian Butler, which examined how events become defined as scandals and their impact on social welfare policy, and "Social Work and Social Policy under Austerity" (2012) with Bill Jordan. He also contributed to "Children, Place and Identity: Nation and Locality in Middle Childhood" (2006), which explored how children understand local and national identities.

== Political career ==
Drakeford has always been interested in politics, which he says was part of the fabric of life in 1960s Carmarthenshire. He has also stated that he was "always Labour", believing that a person's ties to the economy are the great determining factor in their life chances. In addition to his membership of the Labour Party, he is a member of Unite the Union and UNISON, and a solidarity member of LGBT+ Labour. He is a staunch opponent of Britain's Trident nuclear programme and has called for its decommissioning. Drakeford is considered to be part of the left wing of the Labour Party, and is supported by some members of Welsh Labour Grassroots and Momentum. His views were described as soft left in 2018, in line with the views of former Labour leader Michael Foot.

From 1985 to 1993, Drakeford represented the Pontcanna ward on South Glamorgan County Council, with fellow future Welsh Assembly members Jane Hutt and Jane Davidson as his ward colleagues. He served as Chair of the Education Committee and took a particular interest in Welsh-medium education.

Having been part of the successful Yes for Wales campaign in the 1997 Welsh devolution referendum, he was selected as the Labour candidate for Cardiff Central at the first Welsh Assembly election, as part of Labour's 'twinned seats' policy. The seat was won by the Liberal Democrats' Jenny Randerson.

Following Rhodri Morgan’s appointment as First Minister in 2000, Drakeford became the Welsh Government's special adviser on health and social policy, and later served as the head of Morgan's political office. He had been close with Morgan for a number of years, having been Morgan's election agent when he was elected to the UK Parliament. In his role as a special advisor, Drakeford was one of the principal architects of the Clear Red Water philosophy, which made a distinction between Labour Party policy under Morgan in Wales and under Tony Blair in Westminster.

Drakeford succeeded Morgan as the Assembly Member for Cardiff West when the latter retired at the 2011 election. Soon after, he became Chair of the Assembly's Health and Social Care Committee and of the All-Wales Programme Monitoring Committee for European Funds.

In 2013, he was invited by First Minister Carwyn Jones to join the Government, replacing Lesley Griffiths as Minister for Health and Social Services. His appointment was welcomed by the British Medical Association and the Royal College of Nursing. As Health Minister, he guided both the Human Transplantation Act and the Nurse Staffing Levels Act through the Senedd.

In a reshuffle after the 2016 election, he became Cabinet Secretary for Finance and Local Government. His portfolio was later changed, as he assumed responsibility for the Welsh Government's Brexit preparations and responsibility for local government was transferred to Alun Davies.

He was the only sitting Cabinet member in any part of the UK to support Jeremy Corbyn in his bid for the national leadership of the Labour Party in 2015, while he was Minister for Health and Social Services.

At the UK Labour Party's conference in September 2022, Drakeford used his speech at conference to in part hail the benefits of electoral reform. He has been a long term advocate for using proportional representation at general elections.

=== Welsh Labour leadership ===
Immediately following Carwyn Jones' resignation as party leader and First Minister on 21 April 2018, Drakeford told BBC Wales he was giving a leadership bid "serious consideration". Two days later, he Declared himself a candidate in the ensuing leadership contest. He immediately secured the public support of seven other Labour AMs, taking him beyond the threshold of nominations needed to get onto the ballot. Prior to Jones giving written notice of his resignation on 26 September, a further nine Labour AMs nominated Drakeford, meaning a majority of the Labour Group in the Senedd would be supporting his candidacy. He later received support from 10 MPs, eight trade unions and 24 Constituency Labour Parties.

At a special conference on 15 September 2018, it was decided that the voting system for Welsh Labour leadership elections would be changed to a variation of one member, one vote—a change for which Drakeford had been campaigning for over 20 years.

Early policy proposals from Drakeford's leadership campaign included a pilot for universal baby bundles and a push for the devolution of the Probation Service. At the north Wales launch of his campaign, he set out plans for a Social Partnership Act to protect employment rights, and plans to establish a Community Bank for Wales. During an interview, Drakeford said that he was a republican, and had been since the age of 14. According to ITV Wales, were he elected, Drakeford would have a "working relationship with the Royal Family", but did not feel that his views would be "an issue".

On 6 December 2018, Drakeford emerged as leader of the Welsh Labour Party in succession to Carwyn Jones. He received 46.9% of the vote in the first round of the contest, and 53.9% in the second round compared to 41.4% for Vaughan Gething.

On 13 December 2023, he stated his intention to resign as Leader of the Welsh Labour Party, although he would remain as First Minister until his successor was chosen. On 16 March 2024 Vaughan Gething won the Welsh Labour leadership election against Jeremy Miles with 51.7% of the vote.

== First Minister ==
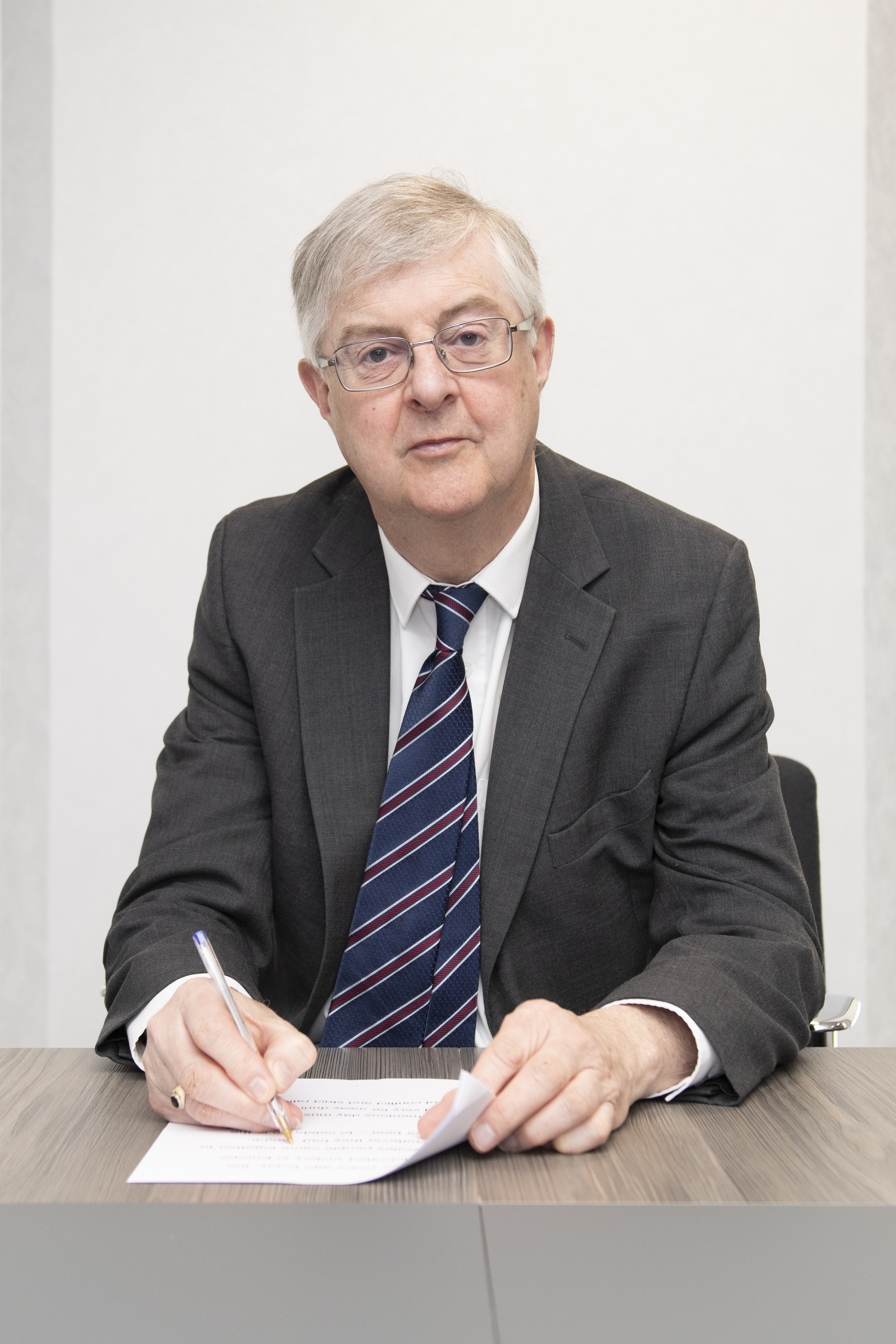
- Premiership of Mark Drakeford; 13 December 2018 – 20 March 2024
- Premier: Mark Drakeford
- Cabinet: First Drakeford government Second Drakeford government
- Party: Welsh Labour
- Election: 2021
- Appointed by: Elizabeth II
- Seat: Tŷ Hywel

Mark Drakeford at a COVID-19 press conference in January 2021

Mark Drakeford was nominated by AMs as First Minister designate on 12 December 2018 and his nomination was approved by Queen Elizabeth II. He named his government the following day. He was appointed as a Privy Counsellor on 10 January 2019.

=== COVID-19 pandemic ===
As First Minister, Drakeford responded to the COVID-19 pandemic in Wales. Many aspects of handling COVID-19 were the responsibility of the Welsh Government, including the setting of restrictions on everyday life designed to curtail the virus.

On 23 March 2020, UK Prime Minister Boris Johnson, having the agreement of all devolved governments, issued a lockdown of the United Kingdom, with only essential services remaining open. First Minister Drakeford announced that the measures would also cover Wales and would come into effect from that evening. The measures put in place restricted people from leaving their home for non-essential travel, with outside exercise limited to once a day. The measures that controlled exercise outside the home differed from those in England, where the measures in place did not stipulate a once-a-day restriction, whereas the Welsh version specifically limited exercise outside the home to once a day, with the maximum fine being £120, compared to £960 in England. On 20 May, the Welsh Government increased the maximum fine to £1,920.

On 25 March the Coronavirus Act 2020 was given Royal Assent, after passing through both Houses in the Parliament of the United Kingdom. The following day the Health Protection (Coronavirus, Restrictions) (Wales) Regulations 2020 were approved by the Senedd, giving the Welsh Government emergency powers to deal with various aspects of managing the pandemic.

Though Drakeford was supportive of a cooperative approach between the various governments of the UK, his government also at times took significantly different decisions such as introducing a two-week "firebreak" lockdown in Wales during October 2020 at a point when the UK government was still operating a system of localised restrictions in England. A social study conducted by University College London praised Drakeford's clear communication of anti-COVID measures. The Welsh Government provided £1.7 billion of support to the Welsh economy during 2020, in addition to UK-wide schemes such as furlough.

=== 2021 Senedd election ===
In the 2021 Senedd election, Labour ran on a manifesto which included various schemes to improve health and social care provision such as investing in mental health services, a new medical school in North Wales and an eventual move towards free-at-point-of-use social care ideally as part of a UK-wide reform. In education, promised policies included tutoring staff to help pupils catch up after the pandemic, funding to improve school facilities, increasing eligibility for free school meals to an unspecified number of children, expanding access to Welsh-medium education and potential reform to the school routine. Other plans included more reforestation, more social housing and possible electoral reform for Senedd elections.

Graphical depiction of the 2021 Senedd Election results

Labour equalled its best ever result, falling one seat short of an overall majority, which has never been achieved in the institution. The BBC reporter Adrian Browne credited the outcome to Mark Drakeford and approval of his handling of the COVID-19 pandemic in Wales. Pollster Ben Walker wrote in a piece for the New Statesman that one of the factors which had contributed to Labour's success at the election was that Drakeford had developed a greater profile among the public in Wales during the COVID-19 pandemic and was perceived as competent and the best potential First Minister. Various commentators suggested that Welsh Labour's success at the election was part of a wider trend in the round of elections which took place across Britain at the same time of incumbents being rewarded and that there were also more long-term factors which placed Labour in a better position to succeed in Wales than elsewhere.

=== Second term and cooperation with Plaid Cymru ===
In November 2021, Drakeford and Plaid Cymru leader Adam Price reached a co-operation agreement on policy in a wide range of areas. Ideas they planned to implement included free-at-the-point-of-use social care, expanding services for children, and restrictions on second homes. The deal was the third time Welsh Labour and Plaid Cymru had agreed to work together in the era of devolution.

==== Major policy initiatives ====
Free school meals were introduced for the youngest children in September 2022 with the intention of being expanded to all primary pupils by 2024.

In May 2021, Drakeford announced his commitment to piloting a Universal Basic Income scheme in Wales, describing it as addressing Wales's poverty and health inequalities. The Future Generations Commissioner Sophie Howe described the commitment as "incredibly significant" and noted that a poll found 69% of people in Wales supported piloting the scheme.

In February 2023 all new road projects in Wales were cancelled as they had failed an environmental test. This decision aligned with the Well-being of Future Generations (Wales) Act 2015, which Drakeford had been instrumental in implementing during his previous ministerial roles.

In April 2023, a number of new powers were granted to local authorities intended to disincentivise second home ownership.

The introduction of a 20mph speed limit on many more roads in September 2023 divided opinion. Wales became the first part of the UK to introduce a nationwide 20 mph speed limit, with the Welsh Government stating that research showed the policy could save £92 million annually and up to 100 lives over the first decade.

The policy proved highly controversial, with a Senedd petition attracting over 470,000 signatures calling for its reversal—the largest in the institution's history. Opinion polling consistently showed public opposition, with an ITV Cymru Wales poll in September 2023 finding 66% opposed and only 31% in support.

Drakeford defended the policy robustly, arguing that it was a manifesto commitment and would save lives. He compared public resistance to the introduction of seatbelt laws and breathalysers, stating that "change is difficult" but would be accepted over time. When asked by Conservative members of the Senedd to reverse the policy, he gave a blunt one-word response: "No".

Early data from the policy's implementation showed significant effects. By February 2024, average speeds on main roads had dropped by 4 mph from 28.9 mph to 24.8 mph, with 54% of vehicles travelling at or below 24 mph compared to 20.8% before implementation. Road casualty data published in June 2024 showed a 32% reduction in casualties on 20 mph and 30 mph roads in the final quarter of 2023 compared to the same period in 2022, the lowest quarterly figure on record outside the COVID-19 pandemic period.

==== Economic policies and nationalisation ====
Drakeford's government pursued a more interventionist economic approach than the concurrent UK government. Rail services across Wales were nationalised in 2021, with Transport for Wales Rail taking over operations from KeolisAmey Wales under an Operator of Last Resort arrangement. This followed the Welsh Government's earlier acquisition of Cardiff Airport in 2013 for £52 million, with total investment reaching over £225 million by 2023.

=== Constitutional and intergovernmental relations ===
Drakeford established the Independent Commission on the Constitutional Future of Wales, which reported in January 2024 on potential reforms to Wales's constitutional arrangements. His tenure was marked by frequent tensions with the UK Conservative governments, particularly over funding arrangements and infrastructure decisions. In 2022, he accused Network Rail of removing Welsh staff to keep English trains running, highlighting ongoing disputes over rail infrastructure priorities.

=== Later challenges and criticism ===
Towards the end of Drakeford's time in office the Welsh government received criticism of its performance in healthcare and education. The 20 mph speed limit policy proved particularly controversial, with polling evidence suggesting significant public opposition. A poll conducted in early December 2023 found that 56% of Welsh voters viewed Drakeford unfavourably.

=== Resignation ===
On 13 December 2023 Drakeford resigned, intending to step down after his replacement had been selected in a leadership contest. In his resignation statement, Drakeford noted that he had served exactly five years as First Minister and had always intended to serve for that duration. He remained as caretaker First Minister until Vaughan Gething succeeded him on 20 March 2024.

== Post-leadership ==
Drakeford served on the backbenches between March and August 2024 during Vaughan Gething's premiership. During this time, he gave a key note speech for Wales Humanists on his approach to good government, equal societies, and human rights. In August, Drakeford was appointed Cabinet Secretary for Health and Social Care on an interim basis under new First Minister Eluned Morgan. In September 2024, Morgan moved Drakeford to Cabinet Secretary for Finance and Welsh Language.

== Personal life ==
Drakeford was married to Clare Buckle from 1977 until her death in January 2023, at the age of 71. They have three children. During the early stage of the COVID-19 pandemic, Drakeford had moved into a building in the couple's back garden to protect his wife and his wife's mother, who were both vulnerable.

Drakeford is said to have a passion for cricket and for growing vegetables on his allotment.

== Selected works ==
- Drakeford, Mark (1999). Privatisation and social policy. London: Longman. ISBN 978-0582356405.
- Butler, Ian; Drakeford, Mark (2005). Scandal, social policy and social welfare (2nd ed.). Bristol: Policy Press. ISBN 978-1861347466.
- Jordan, Bill; Drakeford, Mark (2012). Social work and social policy under austerity. Basingstoke: Palgrave. ISBN 978-1137020635.
- Scourfield, Jonathan; Dicks, Bella; Drakeford, Mark; Davies, Andrew (2006). Children, place and identity: nation and locality in middle childhood. London: Routledge. ISBN 978-0415351263.

== Notes ==
Senedd
Preceded by Rhodri Morgan	Member of the Senedd for Cardiff West; 2011–2026	Succeeded by Constituency abolished
Political offices
Preceded by Lesley Griffiths	Minister for Health and Social Services; 2013–2016	Succeeded by Vaughan Gething
Preceded by Jane Hutt	Cabinet Secretary for Finance; 2016–2018	Succeeded by Rebecca Evans
Preceded by Carwyn Jones	First Minister of Wales; 2018–2024	Succeeded by Vaughan Gething
Preceded by Eluned Morgan	Cabinet Secretary for Health and Social Care; 2024	Succeeded by Jeremy Miles
Preceded by Rebecca Evans	Cabinet Secretary for Finance and the Welsh Language; 2024–2026	Succeeded by Elin Jones
Party political offices
Preceded by Carwyn Jones	Leader of Welsh Labour; 2018–2024	Succeeded by Vaughan Gething
