= Bundesstraße =

German and Austrian national highways

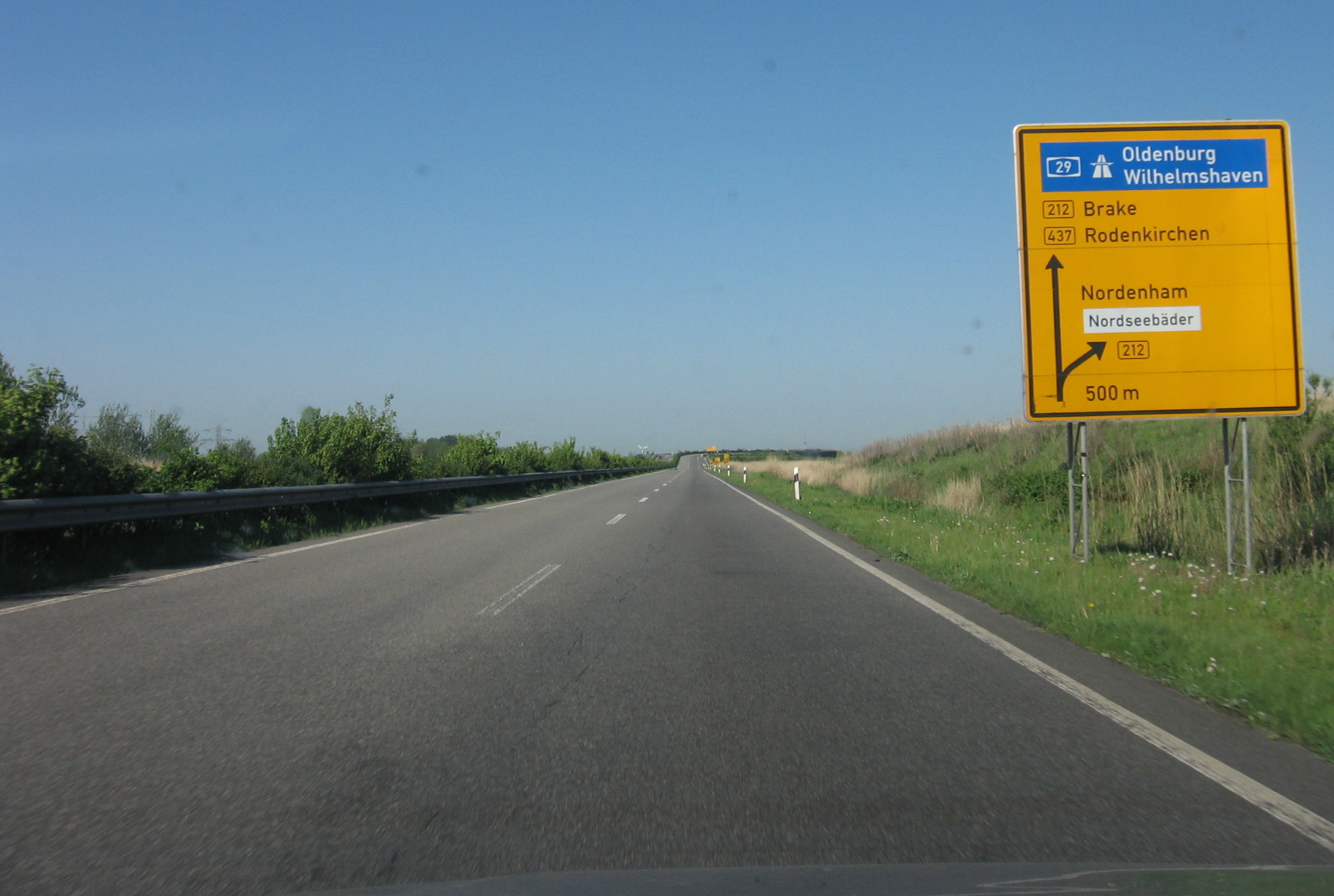
German Bundesstraße 437 near Stadland

Bundesstraße (German pronunciation: [ˈbʊndəsˌʃtʁaːsə], lit. 'federal highway'), abbreviated B, is the denotation for German and Austrian national highways.

== Germany ==
Label of German Bundesstraße 1

Germany's Bundesstraßen network has a total length of about 40,000 km. German Bundesstraßen are labelled with rectangular yellow signs with black numerals, as opposed to the white-on-blue markers of the Autobahn controlled-access highways. Bundesstraßen, like autobahns (Autobahnen), are maintained by the federal agency of the Transport Ministry. In the German highway system they rank below autobahns, but above the Landesstraßen and Kreisstraßen maintained by the federal states and the districts respectively. The numbering was implemented by law in 1932 and has overall been retained up to today, except for those roads located in the former eastern territories of Germany.

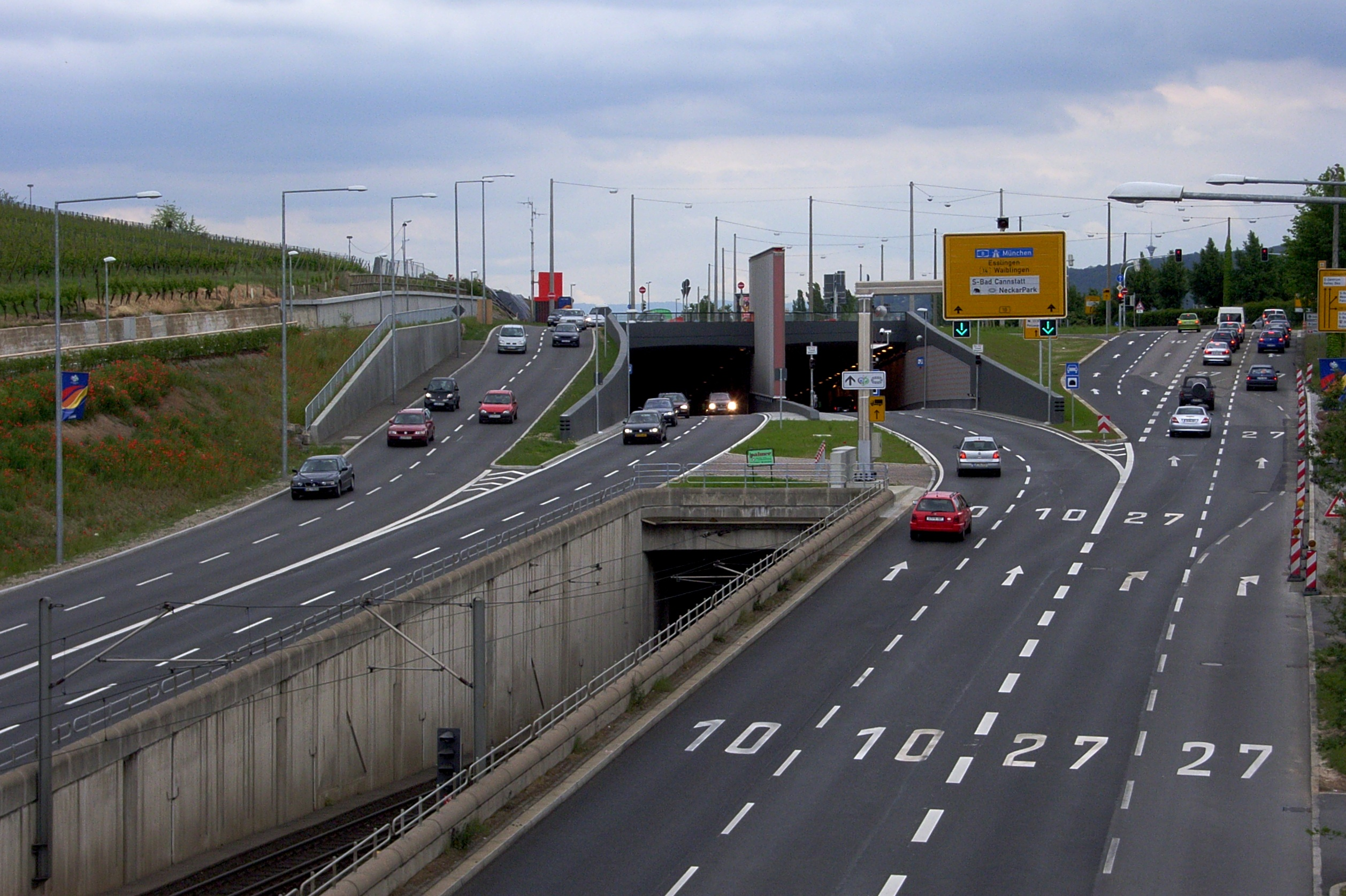
Four-lane B 10 and B 27 interlaced in the city of Stuttgart

One distinguishing characteristic between German Bundesstraßen and Autobahnen is that there usually is a general 100 km/h (62 mph) speed limit on federal highways out of built-up areas, as opposed to the merely advisory speed limit (Richtgeschwindigkeit) of 130 km/h (83 mph) in unmarked sections of the autobahns. However, a number of Bundesstraßen have been extended as expressways (dual carriageways) (colloquially called "Yellow Autobahns"), which can be compared to motorway-grade A roads in the U.K. like the A1(M). Many of these have speed limits of usually 100–120 km/h, others have only an advisory speed limit like autobahns. Most sections of the Bundesstraßen are only single carriageway with one lane for each direction and no hard shoulder pull-out area.

The closest equivalent in the United States would be the United States Numbered Highway System.

== Austria ==
Austrian Landesstraße B 1

In contrast to Germany, according to a 2002 amendment of the Austrian federal road act, Bundesstraßen is the official term referring only to autobahns (Bundesstraßen A) and limited-access roads (Schnellstraßen, Bundesstraßen S). The administration of all other former federal highways (Bundesstraßen B) has passed to the federal states (Bundesländer).

Therefore, officially classified as Landesstraßen, they are still colloquially called Bundesstraßen and have retained their "B" designation (except for Vorarlberg), followed by the number and a name. They are marked by a blue square sign with white number and are per se priority roads.

Before 2002 there has been a further category of Bundesstraßen with circular yellow sign and black number that shows that this road has no fixed priority (right of way for users). A few yellow signs lived longer than 2002.

== See also ==
- List of federal highways in Germany
