= 30 km/h zone =

Road speed limit

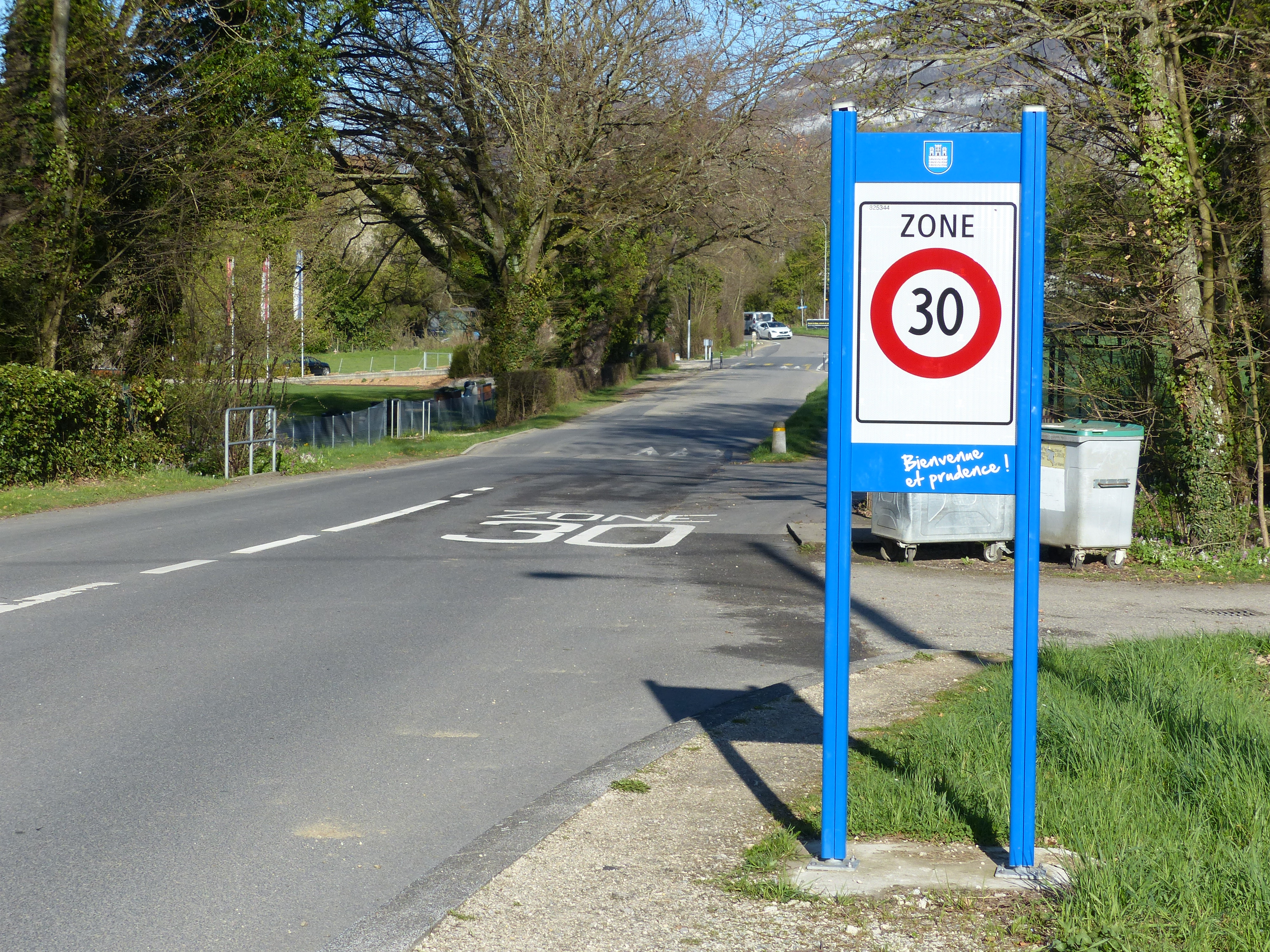
Road sign for a 30 km/h zone in Switzerland

30 km/h zones and similar 20 mph zones are speed limits used across areas of urban roads in some jurisdictions. Although these zones do have the nominal speed limit posted, speeds are generally ensured by the use of physical or psychological traffic calming measures. Limits with signs and lines only are increasingly used in the UK.

== Reasons for implementation ==
The road sign for a 30 km/h (19 mph) zone in Austria

The road sign for a 20 mph (32 km/h) zone in the UK

These zones are generally introduced in residential areas as an attempt to keep road traffic speeds at a safe level. Their guiding philosophy seeks to better integrate the roadways with urban areas of bustling pedestrian activity. Streets in these zones are considered public spaces for all people except those in motor vehicles. The objective is to reduce rat running while improving the safety and standard of living in the area.

Research has shown that reducing driver speeds in built-up areas reduces injuries for all road users, including motorists, cyclists, and pedestrians. The link between vehicle speed and pedestrian crash severity has been established by research studies, with crash severity increasing as a function of motor vehicle speeds. If a vehicle hits a pedestrian while travelling 24 km/h (15 mph), most pedestrians will survive, often sustaining only minor injuries.

Minor increases in impact speed have been shown to have a profound effect on crash severity. At 40 km/h (25 mph), almost all crashes result in severe injuries, and roughly half are fatal; at 64 km/h (40 mph), 90% of crashes are fatal. The dramatic differences in fatality rates are a key part of the theory behind 20 mph and 30 km/h zones. Other studies have revealed that lower speeds reduce community severance caused by high-speed roads in neighbourhoods. For example, there is more neighbourhood interaction and community cohesion when speeds are reduced to 30 km/h.

=== Objectives ===
The objectives of the implementation of 30 km/h zones are to:

- Provide safe street crossings
- Improve the quality of life
- Increase levels of walking and cycling
- Reduce obesity through increased active living
- Reduce rat running and cutting through traffic
- Reducing motor vehicle traffic volumes and speeds
- Reduce road crash rates, injuries, and fatalities for all road users
- Reduce greenhouse gas emissions, air pollution, and noise pollution
- Create an area where pedestrians, cyclists, and motorists coexist safely and comfortably
- Develop a public space that is open and safe for everyone, including people with disabilities
- Increase the space available for walking, biking, and people on the street to eat, play, and enjoy life
- Provide a safe area for children in school zones
- Increase the real estate values of local homes and businesses
- Increase the economic vitality of the area
- Strengthen the sense of community

== Benefits ==
Compared to normal signed but unenforced speed limits, these types of speed zones are more likely to deliver the required traffic speeds because of their traffic-calming aspects.

Reviews of formal studies in many countries have found that 20 mph zones and limits are effective in reducing accidents and injuries, traffic speed, and volume. Speed limits without changes to street layout are less effective, but still have significant benefits.

Death is much less likely if a pedestrian is hit by a car travelling at 30 km/h (20 mph) than at 50 km/h (30 mph) or more. The limited evidence from existing 30 km/h (20 mph) schemes shows marked reductions in deaths and casualties.

== Prevalence ==
=== Europe ===
In European countries, 30 km/h zones have been widely used. On September 1, 1992, the city of Graz, Austria, became the first European city to implement a citywide 30 km/h limit on all roads except its largest. Extensive 30 km/h zones are common throughout the Netherlands. In Switzerland, 30 km/h zones have been allowed by law since 1989 and were first established in Zürich in 1991.

In 2017, most or all IRTAD countries had a default speed limit in urban areas of 50 km/h, with various lower speeds; for instance, in the Netherlands, 70% of the urban roads are limited to 30 km/h.

In 2013, a network of 67 European NGOs organized a European Citizens' Initiative (ECI): "30 km/h – making streets liveable", which collected signatures of support for a 30 km/h speed limit as the normal limit for the European Union. 50 km/h speed limits would then become exceptions. Local authorities would be able to decide on these exceptions and set other speed limits on their street network.

In Munich, 80% of the 2,300 kilometres of urban road network have a speed limit of 30 km/h or less; the remaining roads are limited to 50 km/h.

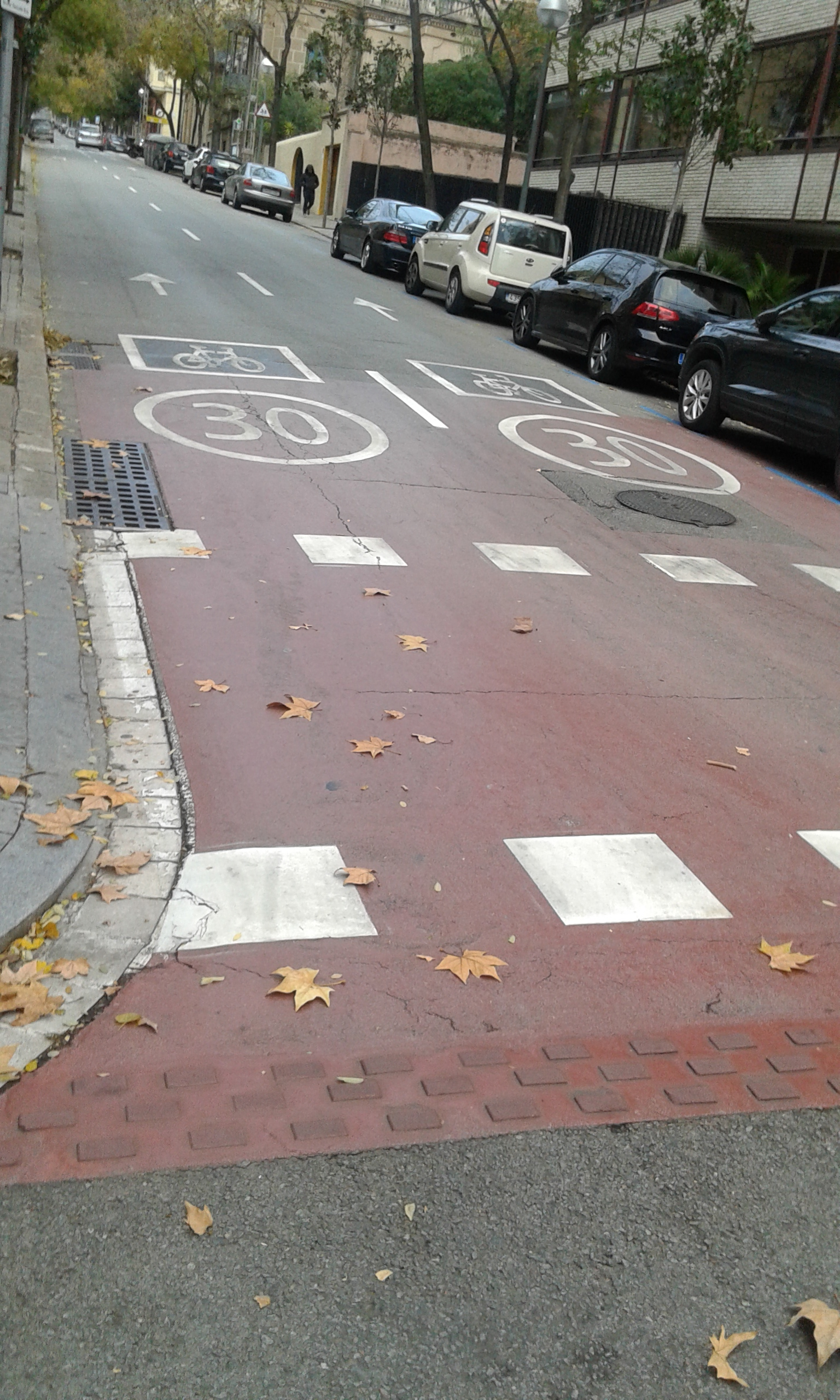
Zone 30 in Barcelona with a raised intersection

85% of Madrid's streets are limited to 30 km/h. In May 2021, the government of Pedro Sánchez rolled out a new regimen of speed limits that limited most urban streets to 30 km/h, some to 20 km/h, and the rest to 50 km/h, depending on the number of lanes and whether the sidewalk is physically separated from street level.

Lyon has the wider 30 km/h zone, with an area of 500 hectares (5 km^{2}) across 87 km of road lanes.

In January 2021, Brussels enacted 30 km/h as the default maximum speed for the entire Brussels Capital Region, the largest such zone in Europe at the time. The Brussels Capital Region has an area of 162 km^{2}.

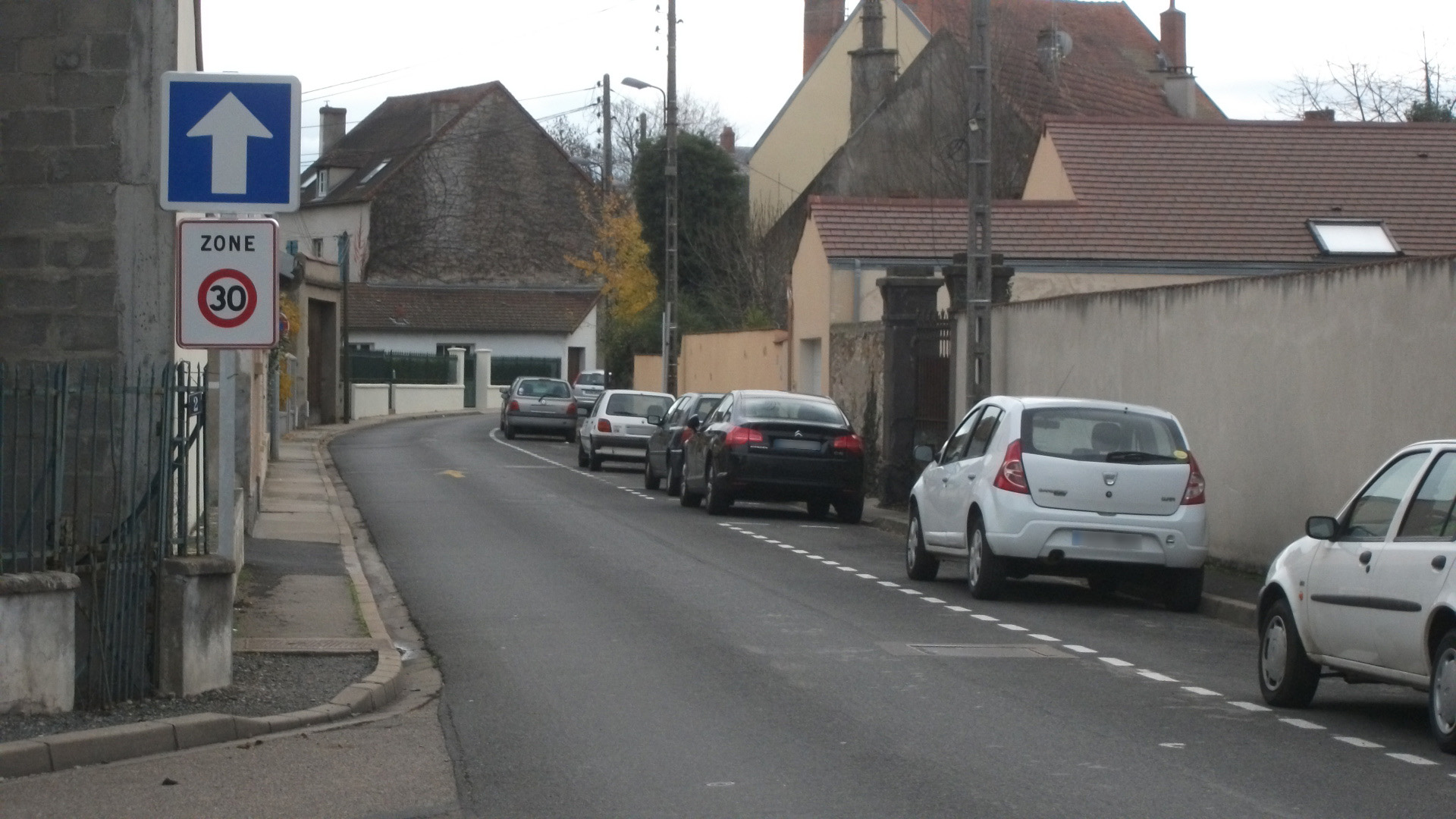
Entry sign for a 30 km/h zone in France.

In France, the towns with the highest length of 30 kilometre zones are Toulouse (479.5 km), Angers (461 km), Paris (396.7 km), Lorient (214.5 km), Grenoble (213.7 km), Tours (183.2 km), and Nantes (179.1 km). Montpellier planned to introduce a 30 km/h zone on 1 August 2021, and since 30 August 2021, Paris has had a 30 km/h zone in most of the city except the périphérique, the boulevards des Maréchaux, and a few other streets.

Since 30 March 2022, Lyon has had a 30 km/h speed limit on 84% of its streets, compared to only 37% previously. This means that 610 kilometres have a 30 km/h speed limit out of a total of 627 kilometres.

On 8 December 2023, Amsterdam implemented "30 km/u in de stad" (30 km/h in the city), expanding the areas in which 30 km/h would be the norm. However, the municipality stresses that this, for legal purposes, is not a '30 km/h zone'. (This term refers to a specifically defined sort of zone in Dutch traffic regulations, with different right-of-way rules than this "new" type of road.)

In January 2024, Bologna enacted 30 km/h as the default maximum speed on 70% of its streets, covering around 90% of the city population.

==== United Kingdom ====
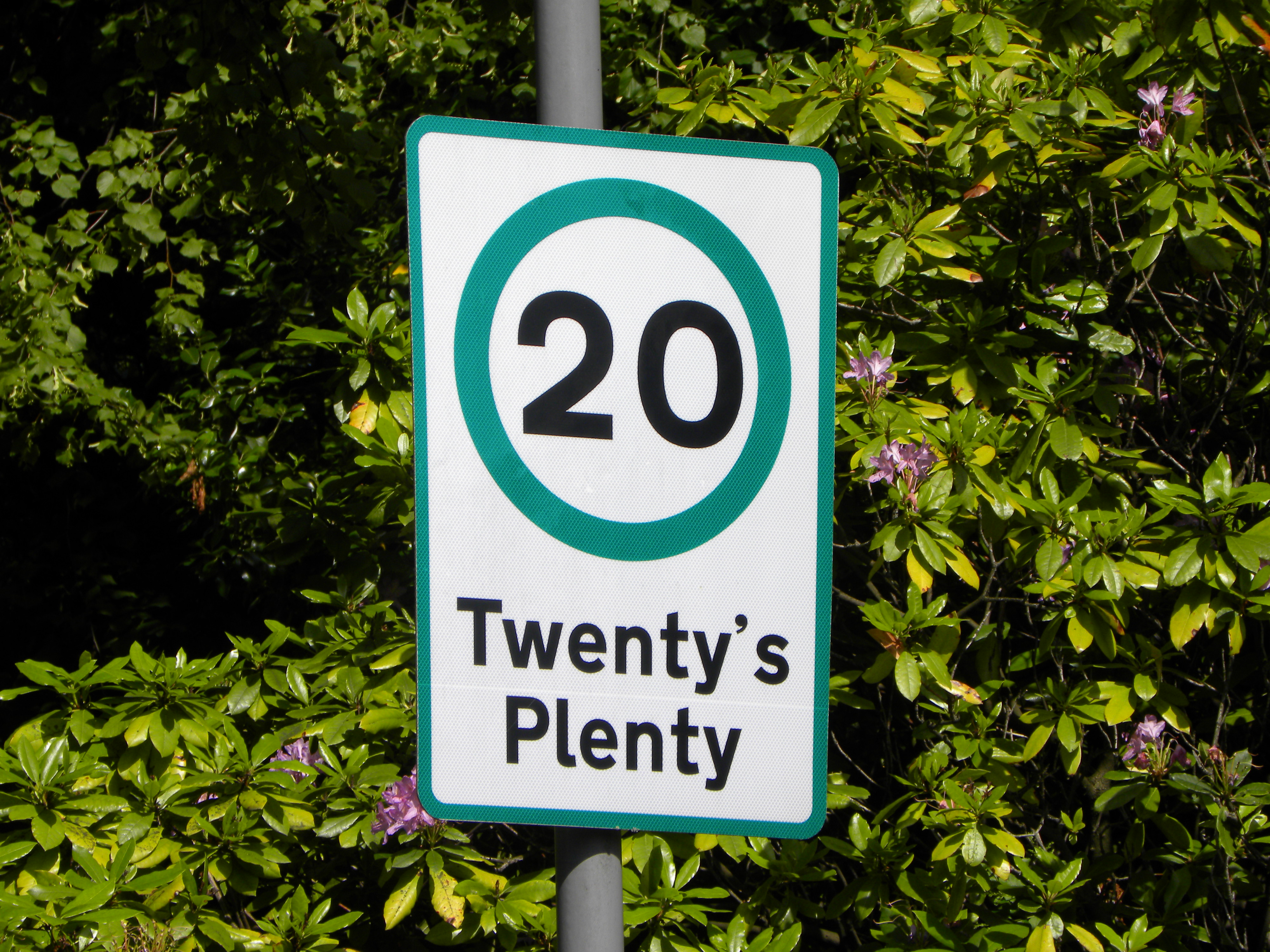
"Twenty's Plenty" sign in Glasgow, Scotland, 2011

There is significant action across the UK, both by organisations and local councils, to implement more 20 mph limits and zones in local communities. 20's Plenty for Us lists populations in UK local authorities committed to wide-area 20 mph limits at over 15 million people in March 2016, with over half of the 40 largest UK urban authorities having agreed to a total 20 mph policy. Some towns define the 20 mph zone as the general speed limit across the city, with a higher speed for main roads.

===== Scotland =====
In March 2018, Edinburgh implemented a citywide network of 20 mph limits. Average speeds have reduced; support for 20 mph is increasing, though compliance is still imperfect; casualties have fallen. There is no evidence of traffic displacement from 20 mph streets to 30 mph streets. The council of the mostly rural Scottish Borders, UK, tried a 20 mph speed limit in 97 villages and towns from October 2020. Speeds reduced and remained lower for at least eight months. The largest speed reductions were in locations with higher speeds, and especially in those having mean speeds greater than 25 mph before the intervention.

===== Wales =====
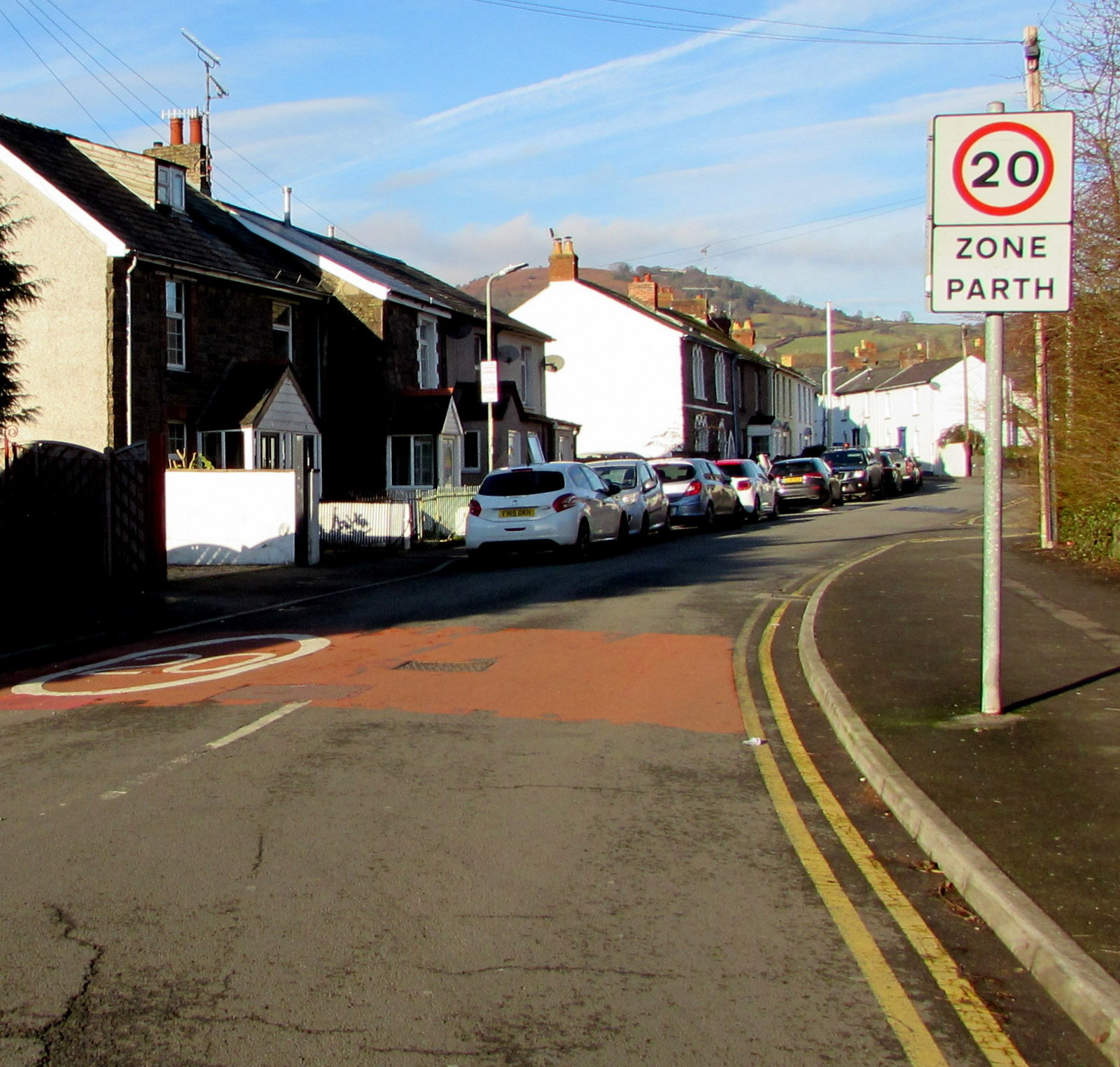
20 mph zone in Abergavenny, Wales

In Wales, in September 2023, after supportive reviews of the literature, commitment in the manifesto of the ruling Welsh Labour party, some years of successful pilot studies, extensive consultation, supportive opinion polls, and further consultation by local councils, a 20 mph limit was introduced as a default for residential roads. Local councils, which implemented the change, were able to make exceptions where appropriate. Public Health Wales predicted that this would save up to ten lives and about two thousand serious injuries per year.

The policy was introduced to the Senedd by a Conservative MS in 2018. It had all-party support for some years, and opinion polls continued to show majority support. However, in 2023, the leader of the Welsh Conservatives began to claim that the policy was for a "blanket" 20 mph limit, and the issue became the "most toxic" in years. A motion of no confidence in Lee Waters, Deputy Climate Change Minister, was backed only by Conservatives and was defeated in the Senedd.

In the week after implementation, analysis of in-vehicle GPS data showed that traffic speeds on urban roads in Wales reduced by 2.9 mph. Half of the drivers were sticking to the new limit, and there was a significant reduction in the length of roads where speeds were well above 24 mph. Three months later, overall average speeds were 2.4 mph less than pre-implementation levels.

In June 2024, insurance company esure reported that vehicle damage claims had fallen by 20 per cent in Wales since the introduction of the 20 mph limit the previous September, during times of the year when such claims normally rise.

=== North America ===
==== United States ====
In the US, 20 mph (32 km/h) speed limits exist along linear routes, but are slow to catch on for area-wide implementation. New York City has implemented 20 mph zones through its Neighborhood Slow Zones Program.

Ten US states already allow 15 mph (24 km/h) or 20 mph (32 km/h) speed limits for linear routes, as follows:

- Alaska stipulates 15 mph (24 km/h) speed limits in alleys and 20 mph (32 km/h) limits in business districts.
- In Delaware, school zones have 20 mph (32 km/h) speed limits.
- Florida has school zones, which usually have 10 mph (16 km/h) to 20 mph (32 km/h) limits. Most use signing and flashing yellow lights during school times, but there is debate surrounding the efficacy of these measures.
- Massachusetts has set its default speed limit at 15 mph (24 km/h) in the vicinity of a mobile vendor with flashing yellow lights (such as an ice cream truck) and at 20 mph (32 km/h) in a school zone when children are present.
- In North Carolina, the Central Business Districts (CBDs) have a statutory speed limit of 20 mph (32 km/h) unless otherwise posted. They use "Reduce Speed Ahead" signage instead of the more common "Reduced Speed Ahead" signage.
- In Oregon, rather than having a "when children are present" speed limit, they have a 20 mph (32 km/h) speed limit with a time-of-day system, usually school days, 7 a.m. to 5 p.m. The speed limit is for school roads with posted speeds of 30 mph (48 km/h) or below.
- Pennsylvania generally uses 15 mph (24 km/h) speed limits for school zones during arrival and departure times.
- In Rhode Island, the default speed limit is 20 mph (32 km/h) within 300 ft (90 m) of a school, which starts to emulate a 20 mph (32 km/h) zone but is not an area-wide speed limit.
- In West Virginia, school zones have a statutory speed limit of 15 mph (24 km/h), except for roads with a speed limit of 55 mph (89 km/h) or higher, which have an advisory speed of 35 mph (56 km/h) in school zones when children are present. A school zone includes 200 ft (60 m) adjacent to the school (or school road) in both directions.
- Wisconsin has a default speed limit of 15 mph (24 km/h) in school zones, near parks with children, and in alleyways.

==== Mexico ====
Mexican sign for Zona 30, installed in complete streets and traffic-calmed areas.

Mexican cities that have established 30 km/h (19 mph) zones (Zonas 30):

- Monterrey, Nuevo León: in Barrio Antiguo
- Guadalajara, Jalisco: in Historic Downtown
- Zapopan, Jalisco: in Historic Downtown
- Los Mochis, Sinaloa: in Downtown
- Puebla, Puebla: in Historic Downtown

=== Oceania ===
==== Australia ====
In Australia, an area in which all streets are 30 km/h is called a 30 km/h area

- Residential streets of Melbourne suburbs Fitzroy and Collingwood are zoned 30 km/h. After implementation, community support from those living or working in the affected area jumped from 47% to 68%.
- Liebig Street in Warrnambool is zoned 30 km/h.
- Sydney CBD's only 30 km/h street is Druitt Street, next to Town Hall station. Other 30 km/h zones in Sydney include Centennial Park, Bicentennial Park, and the Botanic Gardens.
- On 11 July 2020, the Northern Beaches Council reduced the speed limit of Manly's town centre to 30 km/h. Liverpool city centre in Sydney's southwest followed suit on 17 July.
- In June 2024, Parker Street, the main thoroughfare in Cootamundra within NSW, implemented a 30 km/h speed zone.

As of July 2024, there were no more than 15 locations of 30km/h zones in NSW. There was 44km of 30 km/h zones in the city (Sydney) as of March 2024.

==== New Zealand ====
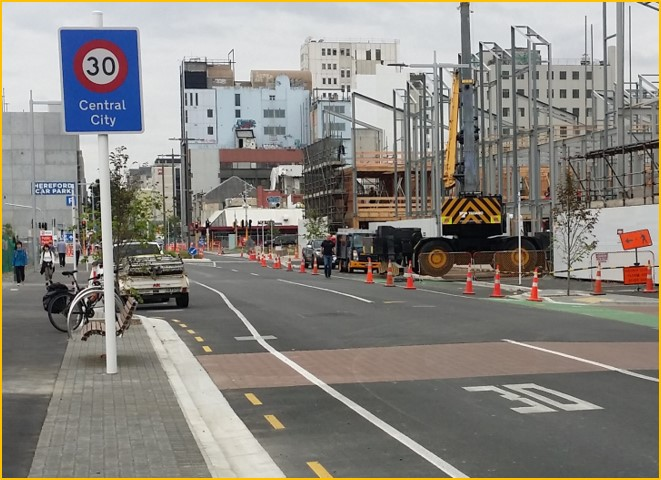
Signs and markings entering the central city 30km/h zone in Christchurch, New Zealand

- A number of suburban shopping areas around Wellington have had 30 km/h limits since ca. 2010.
- In the Wellington Central Business District, 30 km/h limits will be put in place from the end of July 2020.
- The central area of New Plymouth was converted to 30 km/h in July 2012.
- The town centre of Blenheim was reduced to 30 km/h in August 2014.
- A 30 km/h zone was introduced in central Christchurch in March 2016.
- A series of neighbourhood greenways in Christchurch have had 30 km/h limits applied to them, including Papanui Parallel, Uni-Cycle, Quarrymans Trail, Rapanui/Shag Rock, and Heathcote Expressway.
- A growing number of central city main streets in various New Zealand cities have been converted to 30 km/h, including Queen St (Auckland), Victoria St (Hamilton), and George St (Dunedin).
- The beachside area of Mt Maunganui in Tauranga has been 30 km/h since August 2011. The city centre of Tauranga was also reduced to 30 km/h in October 2018.
- In Auckland, 30 km/h speed limits were introduced in July 2017 for the Wynyard Quarter and Viaduct Harbour areas.
