= Road speed limits in the United Kingdom =

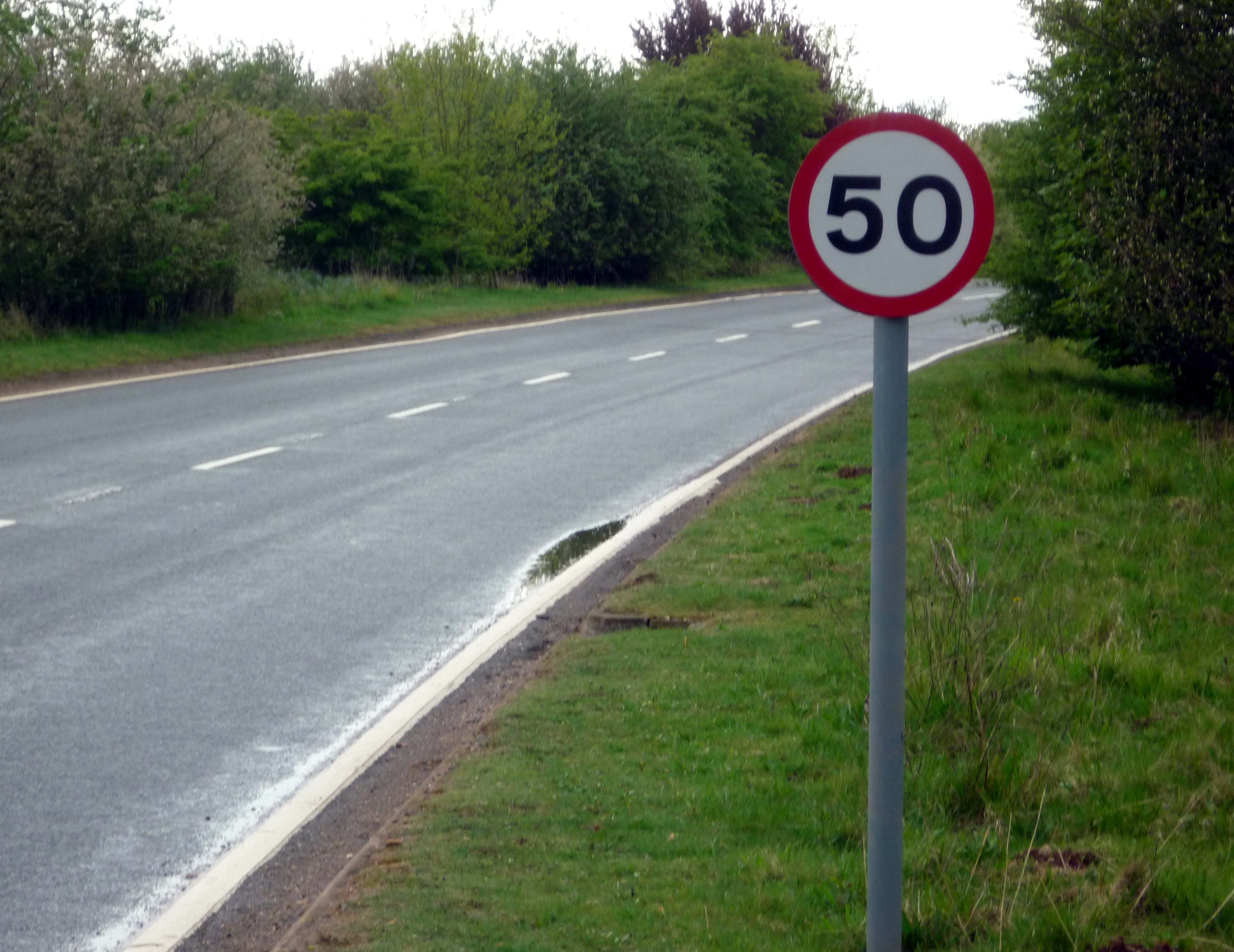
Speed limit sign on a single-carriageway road indicating a speed limit of 50 mph (80 km/h). The limits are posted on both sides of the road.

Road speed limits in the United Kingdom are used to define the maximum legal speed (which may be variable) for vehicles using public roads in the UK.

Speed limits are one of the measures available to attempt to control traffic speeds, reduce negative environmental effects of traffic, increase fuel use efficiency and satisfy local community wishes. The speed limit in each location is indicated on a nearby traffic sign or by the presence of street lighting. Signs show speed limits in miles per hour (mph) or the national speed limit (NSL) sign may be used.

The national speed limit is 70 mph (112 km/h) on motorways and dual carriageways, 60 mph (97 km/h) on single carriageways and generally 30 mph (48 km/h) (20 mph (32 km/h) in Wales) in areas with street lighting (built-up area). These limits may be changed by road signs and apply to cars, motorcycles, car-derived vans up to 2 tonnes maximum laden weight (MLW), and to motorhomes or motor caravans not more than 3 long tons (3.05 tonnes) maximum unladen weight. Other classes of vehicles are subject to lower limits on some roads.

Enforcement of UK road speed limits was traditionally achieved using police 'speed traps' set up and operated by the police who now increasingly use speed guns, automated in-vehicle systems and automated roadside traffic cameras. Some vehicle categories have various lower maximum limits enforced by speed limiters.

Ever since they have been introduced, speed limits have been controversial. They are both opposed or supported by various sources; including motoring advocacy groups, anti-motoring groups and others who either consider them to be irrelevant, set too low or set too high.

== Current regulations ==
=== National speed limits ===
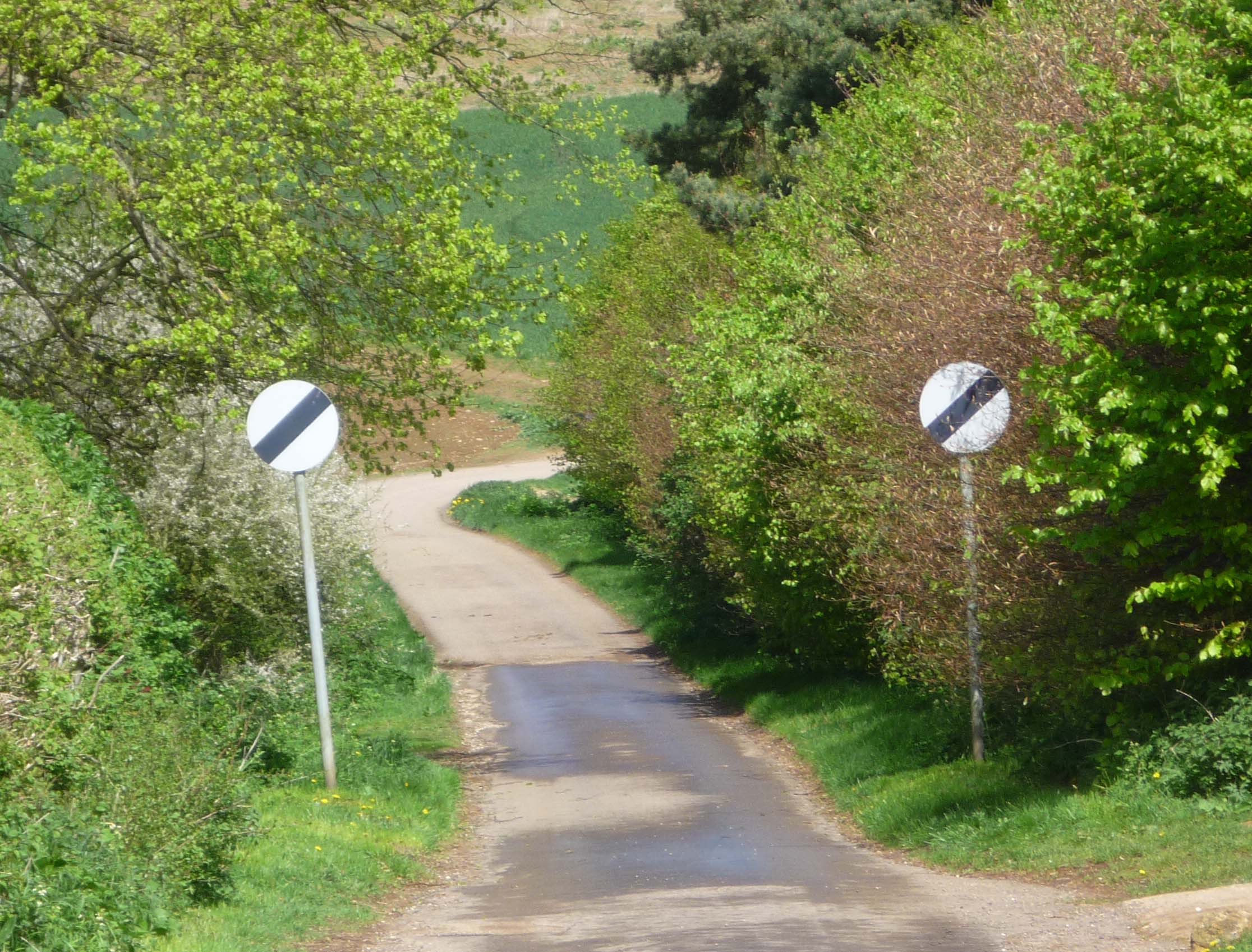
NSL sign on a single-track road implying a speed limit of 60 mph (96 km/h) or 50 mph (80 km/h) depending on vehicle type

Default maximum speed limits apply to all roads where no specific lower numeric speed limit is already in force. The default speed limit is known as the national speed limit (NSL). The NSLs vary by road type and for vehicle types.

National speed limits by vehicle type and road type
| | Built-up area (Wales) | Built-up area (England, Scotland, and Northern Ireland) | Single carriageway | Dual carriageway | Motorway |
|---|---|---|---|---|---|
| Cars and motorcycles (including car-derived vans up to 2 tonnes max laden weight) | 20 mph (32 km/h) | 30 mph (48 km/h) | 60 mph (96 km/h) | 70 mph (112 km/h) | |
| Vehicles towing caravans or trailers inc cars, motorcycles, goods vehicles up to 7.5 tonnes MLW | 20 mph (32 km/h) | 30 mph (48 km/h) | 50 mph (80 km/h) | 60 mph (96 km/h) | 60 mph (96 km/h) |
| Vans, buses, coaches, minibuses up to 12 m (39 ft); Goods vehicles up to 7.5 tonnes MLW | 20 mph (32 km/h) | 30 mph (48 km/h) | 50 mph (80 km/h) | 60 mph (96 km/h) | 70 mph (112 km/h) |
| Goods vehicles over 7.5 tonnes MLW (in England and Wales) | 20 mph (32 km/h) | 30 mph (48 km/h) | 50 mph (80 km/h) | 60 mph (96 km/h) | 60 mph (96 km/h) |
| Goods vehicles over 7.5 tonnes MLW (in Scotland and Northern Ireland) | 20 mph (32 km/h) | 30 mph (48 km/h) | 40 mph (64 km/h) | 50 mph (80 km/h) | 60 mph (96 km/h) |

In Northern Ireland only, vehicles displaying L-plates (for learner drivers) or R-plates (for newly qualified drivers) may not exceed 45 mph (72 km/h), regardless of whether the driver is required to display them. This restriction does not apply to goods vehicles, buses and coaches displaying L-plates while driving on a motorway, or to motorcycles of Class A2 or A displaying R-plates.

=== Speed limiters ===
Some classes of vehicles are required to have speed limiters which enforce a maximum speed by physical means. New vehicles should be fitted with limiters as follows:

- Buses and coaches, including minibuses: 100 km/h (62 mph)
- HGVs: 90 km/h (56 mph)
- Mopeds: 45 km/h (28 mph) (Note: Department for Transport (2009), p.179 "Mopeds redefined to 30 mph maximum design speed")

The law also stipulates retrofitting of limiters to older buses and HGVs, mostly at the above speeds, with two minor variations allowing "70 mph" (technically, 112 km/h) for some older buses, and "60 mph" (96.5 km/h) for a limited selection of HGVs between 7.5 and 12 tonnes. Some older mopeds may be restricted instead to either 30 mph or 50 km/h (31 mph), although the accuracy and reliability of the restriction methods used is variable.

Some other vehicles, especially light commercial or service vehicles, may be voluntarily fitted with limiters by their owners (either private businesspeople or company fleets), generally set to various speeds between 90 km/h (56 mph) and 70 mph (112 km/h), though some mostly-citybound service and delivery vehicles may be limited to 50 mph (80 km/h) or less. Likewise, some heavy goods vehicle operators choose to limit to 85 km/h (53 mph) or 80 km/h (50 mph) for fuel saving. In all cases, a warning sticker must be displayed on the rear of the vehicle.

== Signs ==
Maximum speed limit of 20 mph (32 km/h)

Maximum speed limit of 30 mph (48 km/h)

Maximum speed limit of 40 mph (64 km/h)

Maximum speed limit of 50 mph (80 km/h)

Maximum speed limit of 60 mph (96 km/h) (only used on dual carriageways)

Maximum speed limit of 70 mph (112 km/h) (only used on Scottish motorways and UK special roads)

National speed limit

Minimum speed limit of 30 mph (48 km/h)

End of minimum speed limit of 30 mph (48 km/h)

Entrance to a 20 mph (32 km/h) speed limit zone

Exit from a 20 mph (32 km/h) speed limit zone (maximum speed limit of 30 mph (48 km/h))

== 20 mph speed limits and zones ==
The Department for Transport encourages the use of either '20 mph (32 km/h) speed limits' or '30 mph (48 km/h) speed limit zones' in urban situations where vulnerable road users are at particular risk.

In 1998 the TRL reported that signed 20 mph (32 km/h) speed limits only reduced traffic speeds by about 1 mph (1.6 km/h) and delivered no discernible reduction in crash numbers but that 20 mph (32 km/h) zones achieved average speed reductions of 10 mph (16 km/h) with child pedestrian crash reductions of 70% and child cyclist crash reductions of 48%. The report noted that the cost of wide area traffic calming was prohibitive.

=== 20 mph speed limits ===
20 mph (32 km/h) speed limits are based on signage alone and are used where 85th percentile speeds are already below 24 mph (39 km/h).

A report published in 2010 by the Department for Transport regarding Portsmouth City Council's 20 mph (32 km/h) speed limit on 255 miles (410 km) of the city's 272 miles (438 km) of roads found a small 1.3 mph (2.1 km/h) reduction in traffic speed and a small 8% increase in the number of serious crashes – neither of which were statistically significant – and a 21% reduction in the number of crashes. There was a 6% increase in the numbers killed or seriously injured (KSI) – also not statistically significant due to the small numbers involved – and a 22% reduction in the total number of road casualties.

=== 20mph zones ===
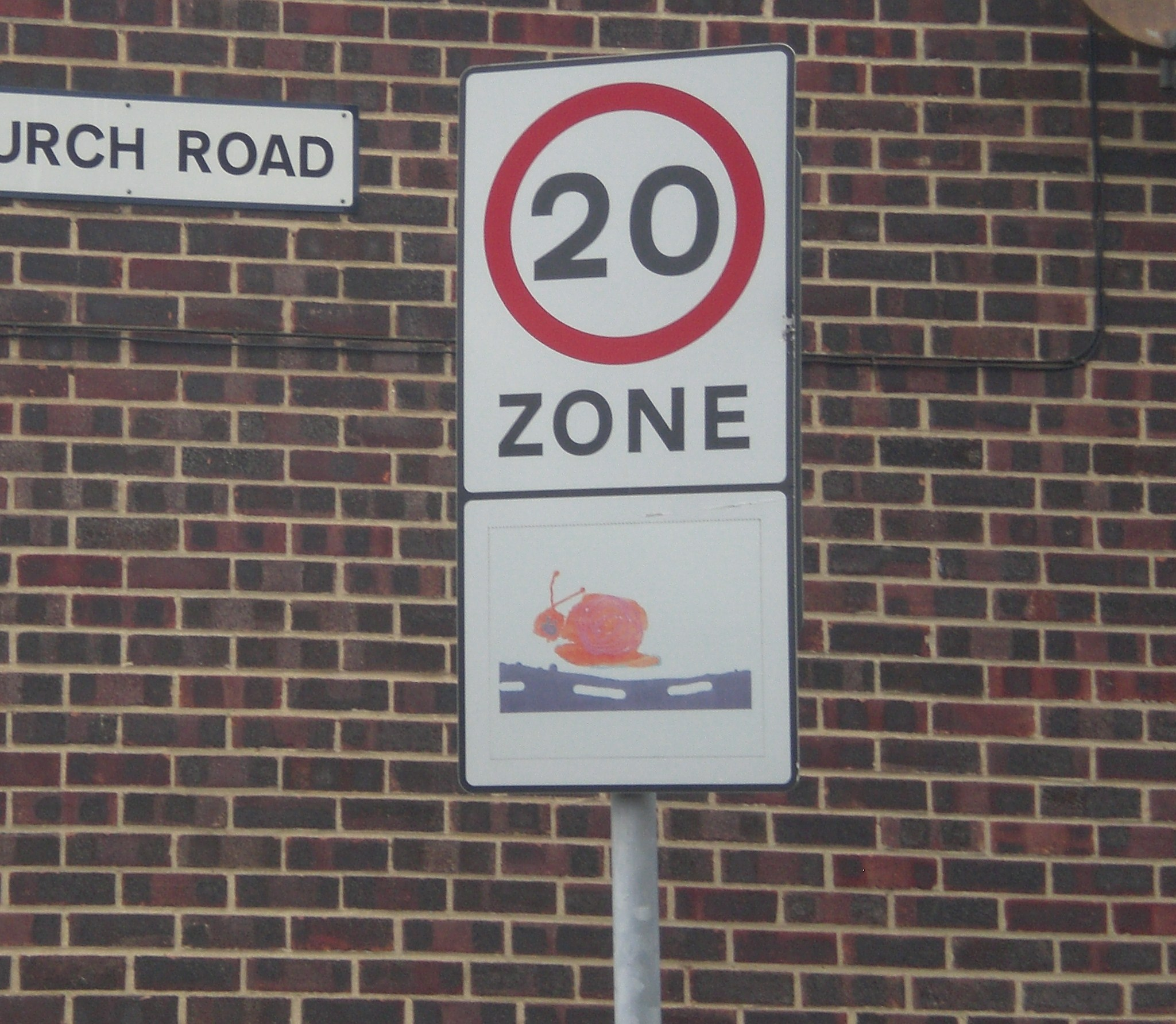
Road sign used to mark the start of a 20 mph (32 km/h) zone

In places where 20 mph (32 km/h) speeds are desired but where excessive speeds (85th percentile speed of 24 mph (39 km/h) or above) occur, 20 mph (32 km/h) zones are recommended. These have to use traffic calming measures to reduce speeds to below 20 mph (32 km/h).

A report published in 2008 estimated that following the introduction of 20 mph (32 km/h) zones in London, a reduction of casualties by 45% and KSI by 57% occurred.

=== 20 mph default speed limit in Wales ===
On 17 September 2023, Wales introduced a default speed limit of 20 mph (32 km/h) in built up areas. An estimated 7,700 miles (12,400 km) of the 22,000 miles (35,000 km) of road in the country was changed from a 30 mph (48 km/h) to a 20 mph (32 km/h) speed limit, with local authorities allowed to apply for exemptions to the new law. Following its introduction, only an estimated 3% of the total road network in Wales remains at 30 mph (48 km/h), as opposed to 37% before the change. The Welsh Government said they were implementing this to reduce death and injury on the roads, as well as to reduce noise and pollution and encourage active travel. This was despite their own figures showing the measure could cost Wales £4.5 billion over a 30-year period. Spain had already enacted a similar default speed limit in 2019. Across the UK, many cities and towns already had residential areas with 20 mph (32 km/h) speed limits. Scotland were considering a similar 20 mph (32 km/h) default speed limit to Wales.

=== Shared space ===
Research carried out for the Department for Transport, to provide supporting evidence for Local Transport Note 1/11 on shared space, showed that in all of the ten shared space sites that were studied, that although they all had speed limits of 30 mph (48 km/h), that the average speeds on them was around 20 mph (32 km/h).

== Types of speed limit ==
=== Fixed speed limits ===
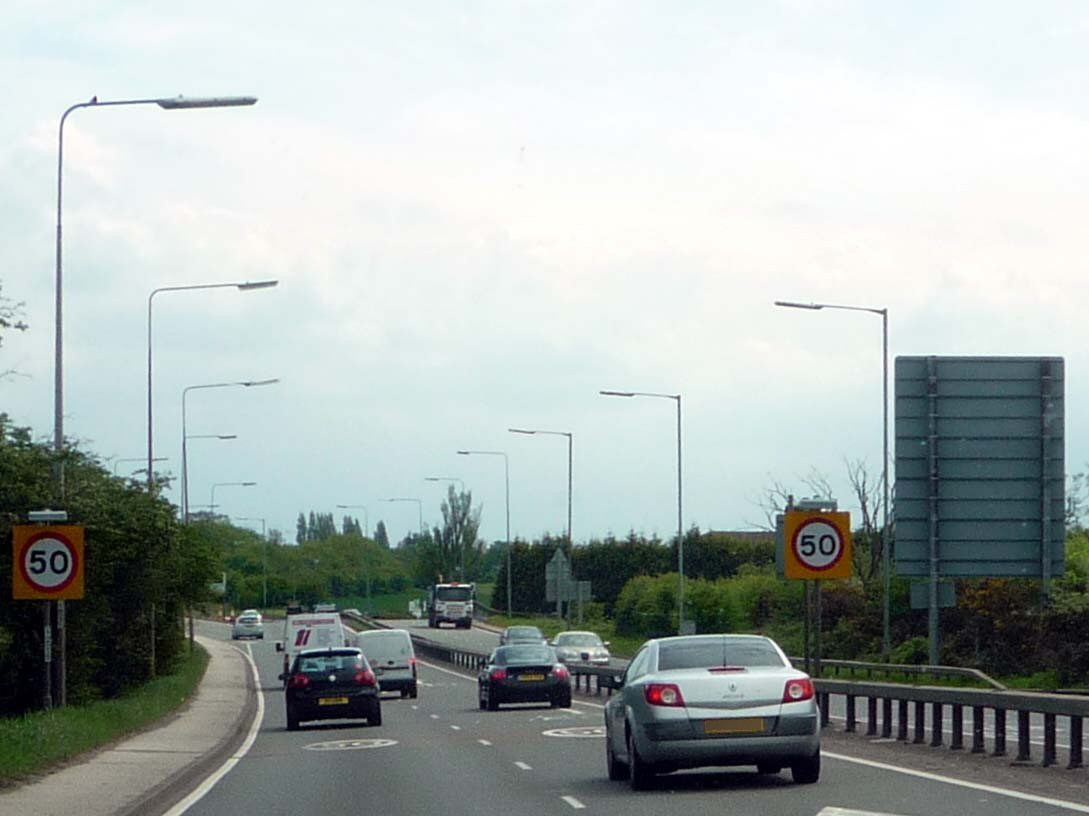
50 mph (80 km/h) sign on a dual-carriageway road

Speed limit road signs are used to inform road users where speed limits other than the applicable national speed limit apply.

=== Variable speed limits ===
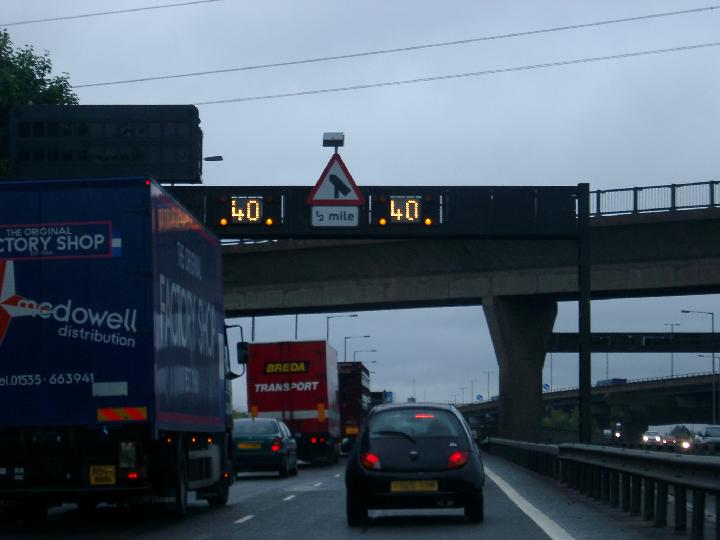
An advisory maximum speed sign

Variable speed limits are used on some major traffic roads. These can be changed in response to weather, traffic levels, time of day or for other reasons with the currently applicable speed limit displayed using an electronic road sign. Signs with the speed shown in a red circle are compulsory, signs where the speed is not within a red circle are advisory and exceeding these speeds while driving safely within the applicable national speed limit is not in itself an offence. Variable speed limits were introduced on some congested major routes as an element of controlled motorway techniques to improve traffic flows for given prevailing conditions. Part-time variable speed limits may also be used outside schools.

=== Minimum speed limits ===
Rarely, minimum speed limits are used, such as through the Mersey Tunnels, to maintain free flow and safe passage through otherwise hazardous or enclosed areas. Circular blue signs with white numbers indicate the start of these limits, and similar signs with a red diagonal line indicate their end. Contrary to popular belief, there is no minimum speed limit on motorways, although certain classes of slow vehicles (as well as those of any class that cannot maintain 25 mph (40 km/h) on the level whilst unladen) are prohibited on safety grounds and drivers are expected to not cause unnecessary obstruction by driving unusually slowly.

== Justification ==
According to the government, speed limits are used to help achieve appropriate traffic speeds for safety, and environmental and accessibility reasons. The Department for Transport state that "speed limits play a fundamental role" in the effective management of traffic speeds in relation to the safety of both drivers and all other road users.

=== Safety ===
The 30 mph (48 km/h) speed limit in built-up areas was introduced in 1934 in response to high casualty levels. The 70 mph (112 km/h) limit on previously unrestricted roads was introduced in 1965 following a number of serious motorway crashes in fog earlier the same year.

The Department for Transport believes that effective speed management involves many components but that speed limits play a 'fundamental role' and are 'a key source of information to road users' particularly as an indicator of the nature and risks posed by that road to both themselves and other motorised and non-motorised road users.

The Parliamentary Select Committee for Transport Safety published a report entitled 'The Ending the Scandal of Complacency' in 2007 which highlighted how casualty levels rise with increasing speed and recommended reducing speed limits on streets with high pedestrian populations and on dangerous rural roads. The report highlights that when two cars crash head-on at 60 mph (96 km/h) a driver has a 90% chance of dying which falls to 65% at 50 mph (80 km/h). While recommending 20 mph (32 km/h) speed zones the committee noted that these zones 'should not rely on heavy-handed enforcement measures'.

In 2008 14% of collisions reported to the police had a speed-related contributory factor (either "exceeding the speed limit" or "travelling too fast for conditions") reported rising to 24% for fatal crashes and 25% of all road deaths. (Note: Department for Transport (2009), p. 41 "Fourteen per cent of accidents had a speed related contributory factor reported, either exceeding the speed limit or travelling too fast for conditions. This increased to 24% for fatal accidents, accounting for 25% of all road deaths.") "Exceeding the speed limit" was reported as a contributory factor in 5% of collisions and 14% of fatal collisions. "Travelling too fast for conditions" (but within the prevailing speed limit) was recorded as one of the contributory factors in a further 8% of all collisions (and 9% of all fatal, 9% of all serious and 8% of all slight accidents), (Note: Department for Transport (2009), p. 45 "Exceeding the speed limit was reported as a contributory factor in 5% of all accidents. However, the factor became more significant with the severity of the accident. It was reported in 14% of fatal accidents and these accidents accounted for 362 fatalities, 15% of all deaths... The factor travelling too fast for conditions was a contributory factor in 8% of accidents. Again, the proportion of accidents where it was reported rose with the severity of the accident and 9% of fatal resulting in 224 fatalities, 10% of all deaths (Excluding accidents and casualties in accidents which had exceeding the speed limit reported as a contributory factor)")

The UK government publishes Reported Road Casualties Great Britain (RRCGB) each year, based on road traffic casualties data (STATS19) reported to the police, which has been collected since 1949, and with additional data going back to 1926. The highest number of road fatalities recorded in a single year in GB was 9,196 in 1941. (Note: Department for Transport (2009), p.106 "The highest record road death figure was 9,196 in 1941") The highest number of fatalities during peacetime was 7,985 for 1966, (Note: Department for Transport (2009), p. 106 table 2) following the introduction of the national 70 mph (112 km/h) speed limit in 1965 and the year before the legal drink drive limit and the associated Breathalyzer laws were introduced.

The 2009 edition also summarised the characteristics of speed related fatal collisions as typically occurring on unclassified rural 60 mph (96 km/h) speed limit roads, the driver being a male under the age of 30, with the collision types being head-on, lost control or cornering and the cause being loss of control whilst cornering or overtaking and the contributory factors being excess or inappropriate speed, loss of control, aggressive, careless or reckless behaviour or in a hurry. (Note: Department for Transport (2010), pdf p. 91, table 7a)

=== Environmental and accessibility ===
Speed limits are also used where reduced vehicle speeds are desired to help reduce vehicle emissions and traffic noise, and to improve the accessibility conditions for more vulnerable road users such as pedestrians and cyclists and to reduce the perceived traffic risk for local people.

During the 1973 oil crisis a temporary maximum national speed limit of 50 mph (80 km/h) was introduced on all roads, including motorways to reduce fuel consumption, which was later progressively raised on Motorways (to 70 mph (112 km/h)) and dual carriageways (to 60 mph (96 km/h)), before a final change to single and dual carriageway non-motorway roads that produced the current NSL situation.

== Effectiveness ==
Parliament estimates that "Most drivers and pedestrians think speeds are generally too high but 95% of all drivers admit to exceeding speed limits". DfT guidance makes it clear that setting speed limits in isolation, or setting ones that are "unrealistically low" may be ineffective and lead to disrespect for the speed limit. Bath and North East Somerset Council say that speed limits on their own do not necessarily reduce traffic speeds and should be supported by enforcement to target "irresponsible drivers" or traffic calming.

=== Compliance ===
In the UK, in 2017 the average free flow speed for each vehicle type is correlated with the applicable speed limit for that road type and for motorways and national speed limit single carriageway roads, the average free flow speed is below the designated speed limit for each vehicle type, except motorcycles on motorways.

== Enforcement ==
Speed limit enforcement is used to check that road vehicles are complying with the speed limits. Methods used include Fixed speed cameras, Average speed cameras and also police operated LIDAR speed guns and older radar speed guns. In addition Vehicle activated sign and Community Speed Watch groups also encourage compliance. For lower speed limits, physical Traffic Calming is normally required. Fixed speed cameras are controversial with various advocacy groups supporting and opposing their use.

The Nottingham Safety Camera Pilot achieved "virtually complete compliance" on the major ring road into the city using average speed cameras, and across all Nottinghamshire SPECS installations their KSI figures have fallen by an average of 65%.

== Advocacy ==
Since they have been introduced various groups have campaigned on the subject who either consider them to be irrelevant, set too low or set too high.

Advocacy groups include Association of British Drivers, The Automobile Association, Living Streets (The Pedestrians' Association), RAC Foundation, RoadPeace, Royal Automobile Club (originally the Automobile Club), Twenty is Plenty (20's Plenty for Us), Safe Speed and others.

In 2024 it emerged Conservative Party politicians in England had been running popular Facebook groups opposed to the 20 mph (32 km/h) speed limit in Wales.

== History ==
=== Early years ===
The first speed limits in the United Kingdom were set by a series of restrictive Locomotive Acts (in 1861, 1865 and 1878). The 1861 Act introduced a 10 mph (16 km/h) limit (powered passenger vehicles were then termed "light locomotives"). The Locomotives Act 1865 (the 'Red Flag Act') reduced the speed limit to 4 mph (6.4 km/h) in the country and 2 mph (3.2 km/h) in towns and required a man with a red flag or lantern to walk 60 yd (55 m) ahead of each vehicle, and warn horse riders and horse drawn traffic of the approach of a self-propelled machine. The Highways and Locomotives (Amendment) Act 1878 (41 & 42 Vict. c. 77) removed the need for the flag and reduced the distance of the escort to 20 yd (18 m).

Following intense advocacy by motor vehicle enthusiasts, including Harry J. Lawson of the Daimler Company the most restrictive parts of the acts were lifted by the Locomotives on Highways Act 1896. which raised the speed limit to 14 mph (23 km/h) and removed the need for the escort. A celebratory run from London to Brighton was held soon after the act was passed and has been commemorated each year since 1927 by the London to Brighton Veteran Car Run.

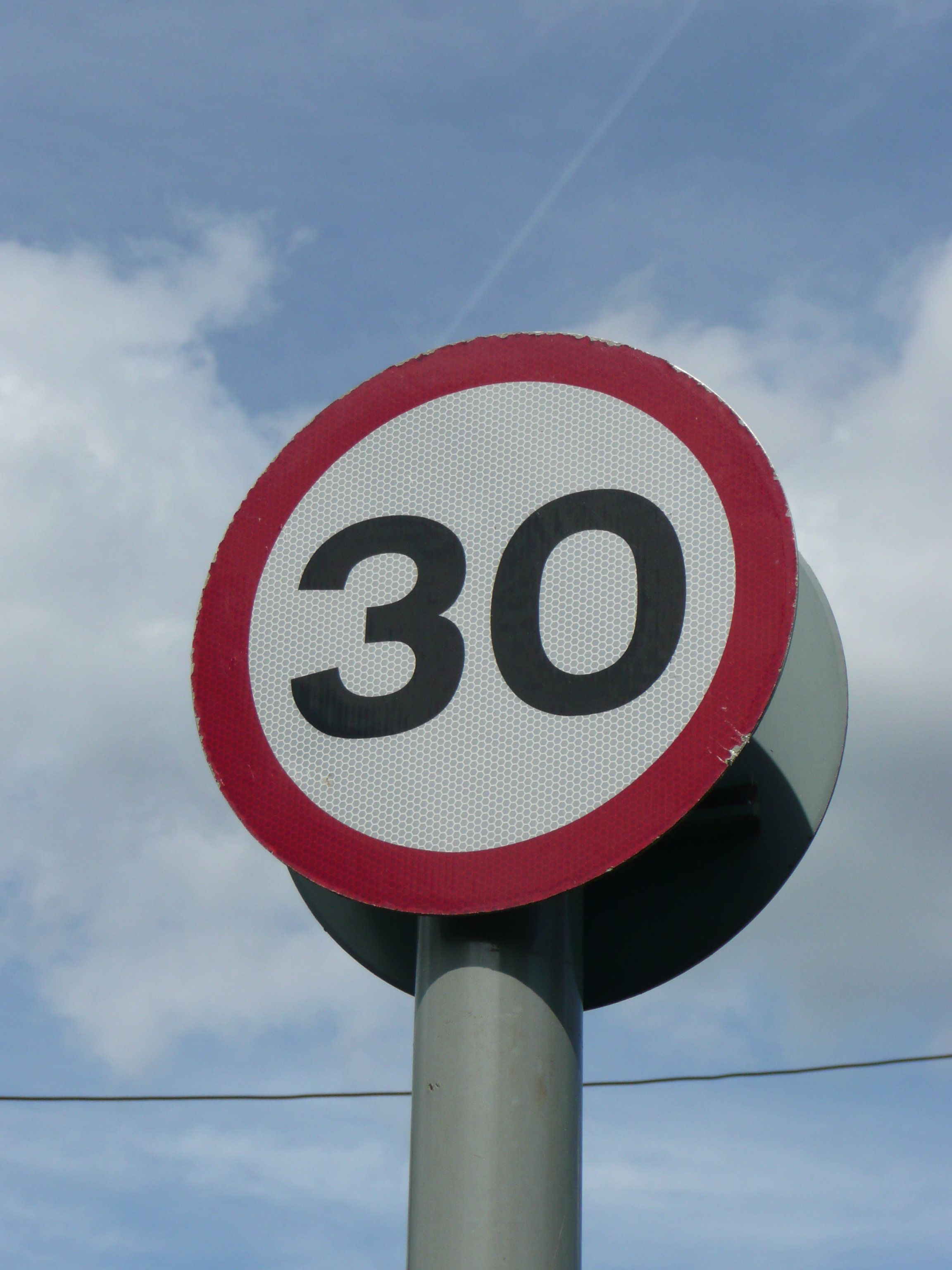
30 mph (48 km/h) repeater sign used to remind drivers of the speed limit (on a road without street lighting)

The speed limit for motor cars was raised to 20 mph (32 km/h) by the Motor Car Act 1903 which stood until 1 January 1931 when all speed limits for cars and motorcycles were abolished under the Road Traffic Act 1930. Lord Buckmaster's opinion at the time was that the speed limit was removed because "the existing speed limit was so universally disobeyed that its maintenance brought the law into contempt". Between 1930 and 1935 the number of annual road fatalities dropped from 7,305 to 6,502. The same act also introduced a 30 mph (48 km/h) speed limits for UK coach services, UK bus services and most HGVs. Buses were not necessarily fitted with speedometers at this stage.

A 'Road Traffic (Speedometer) Bill' was debated in 1933 relating only to vehicles to which current speed limits applied.

The Road Traffic Act 1934 (24 & 25 Geo. 5. c. 50), created by Leslie Hore-Belisha, the then Minister of Transport, introduced a speed limit of 30 mph (48 km/h) in built-up areas for cars and motorcycles which came into effect on 18 March 1935. The definition of a built-up area was based on the presence of street lighting, which had previously been mandated by the Public Health Act 1875. The re-introduction of a speed limit for cars was in response to concern at increased road casualties. Between 1935 and 1940 the number of annual road fatalities increased from 6,502 to 8,609.

Speedometers were made compulsory for new cars in 1937.

=== World War II ===
A 20 mph (32 km/h) night-time speed limit for built-up areas was introduced in 1940 as an attempt to halt the increase in the number of road casualties occurring during the World War II blackouts. Following the introduction of blackouts fatalities rose on speed-limited roads from 289 in March 1939 to 325 in March 1940. For October 1940 the total number of deaths during daylight (when the speed limit didn't apply) fell, in relation to those for October 1939, from 511 to 462, whereas the figures for the black-out hours (when the speed limit did apply) rose from 501 to 684. The highest number of deaths in any one year in the UK occurred the following year (9,196 people in 1941). (Note: Department for Transport (2009), p. 106 "The highest record road death figure was 9,196 in 1941")

=== 1945–1969 ===
On 1 October 1956, the 30 mph (48 km/h) speed limit for built-up areas became permanent under the Road Traffic Act 1956. The speed limit, introduced on a trial basis in 1935, had relied on being renewed by Parliament each year. The maximum speed limit for goods vehicles was raised from 20 to 30 mph (32 to 48 km/h) in 1957.

In addition, around 1958 some 30 mph (48 km/h) roads had the limit raised to 40 mph (64 km/h) to improve transit times, an early example being on Croydon Road in Mitcham, Surrey, saving, it was estimated, 33 seconds in journey time across Mitcham Common.

Following a series of serious motorway multiple crashes in the fog in 1965, Tom Fraser, the then Minister of Transport, following consultations in early November with the police and with the National Road Safety Advisory Council (NRSAC), concluded that the crashes were caused by vehicles travelling too fast for the prevailing conditions. The NRSAC advised that a 20 mph (32 km/h) motorway speed limit should be imposed on motorway stretches affected by fog and that a general speed limit of 70 mph (112 km/h) should be experimentally applied for the winter months.

On 25 November 1965 the government announced that a temporary 30 mph (48 km/h) speed limit would be applied to sections of motorway (there were 350 mi (560 km) of it at that time) affected by fog, ice or snow and that a general maximum speed limit of 70 mph (112 km/h) would be applied to all otherwise unrestricted roads, including motorways, for a trial period of four months starting just before Christmas. The four-month trial 70 mph (112 km/h) speed limit on 100,000 mi (160,000 km) of previously unrestricted roads and motorways was introduced at noon on 22 December 1965. Also on that day, the power for the police to apply advisory speed limits of 30 mph (48 km/h) to motorways affected by bad weather was also introduced. The advisory limit was activated by the use of flashing amber lights placed at 1 mi (1.6 km) intervals along the motorways.

In April 1966 Barbara Castle, the new Minister of Transport, decided to extend the experimental 70 mph (112 km/h) limit for a further two months to allow the Road Research Laboratory (RRL) time to collect data as there was still no conclusive evidence of its effectiveness. In May 1966 Barbara Castle extended the experimental period by a further fifteen months to 3 September 1967 as "the case is not proven" but there were signs of crash rate reduction.

In July 1966 the speed limit for "public service vehicles" (notably buses) was raised from 40 to 50 mph (64 to 80 km/h). During 1966, the highest number of fatalities during peacetime at 7,985 deaths, was recorded.

In July 1967, Castle announced that 70 mph (112 km/h) was to become the permanent maximum speed limit for all roads and motorways. She had accepted RRL evidence that the speed limit had reduced the number of casualties on motorways. She ruled out minimum speed limits for motorways which would also reduce the danger of slow traffic as being too difficult to enforce and likely to increase congestion off the motorways.

The two major motoring organisations at the time, The Automobile Association and the R.A.C. welcomed the maximum speed limits for all-purpose roads, but the R.A.C. would have preferred more flexibility for motorways. The Royal Society for the Prevention of Accidents suggested that a lower speed limit would be more appropriate for all-purpose roads and the Pedestrian's Association for Road Safety condemned the new limits as being too high, preferring 60 mph (96 km/h) limits for all roads. Castle's decision and acceptance of the RRL research at face value was controversial. Peter Walker's motion in Parliament to annul the speed limit on motorways was not adopted.

==== The introduction of the 70 mph (112 km/h) speed limit ====
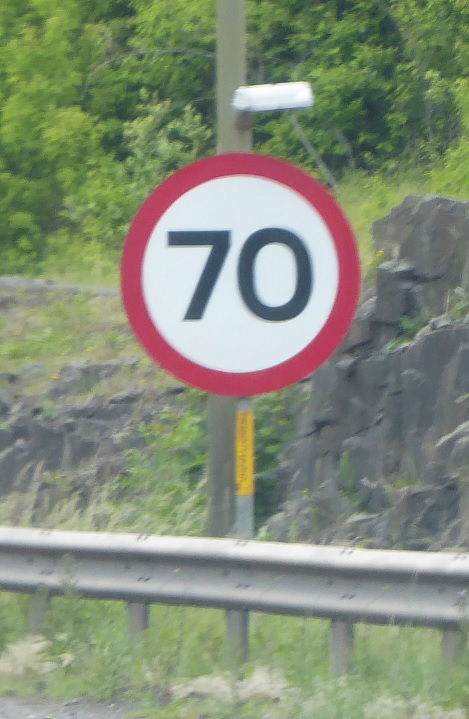
70 mph (112 km/h) speed limit sign

On 22 December 1965, a temporary 70 mph (112 km/h) speed limit was introduced on previous unrestricted roads and motorways for 4 months. At the end of the trial, speed checks on the M6 in Cheshire suggested that although cars were actually being driven about 10 mph (16 km/h) faster, they were still usually travelling at speeds below the new limit. The crash rate was lower on the M6 in Staffordshire (the better weather was noted too) and continued to fall on the M5 in Worcestershire as it had before the new limit was imposed, and there was no change in the crash rate on the M6 in Cheshire or on the M1 in Northamptonshire.

The trial was extended and then made permanent in 1967. The blanket limit was reduced to 60 mph (96 km/h) on single carriageways in 1977.

Although these 70 mph (112 km/h) speed limit road signs are normally not used on motorways (the National Speed Limit road sign is normally used, as it makes it more understandable for motorists their maximum speed on the type of vehicle they're using), they have been used on non-motorway special roads within the UK, and across the motorways within Scotland.

=== 1973 oil crisis ===
Due to the 1973 oil crisis, a temporary maximum national speed limit of 50 mph (80 km/h) for all roads, including motorways, was introduced on 8 December 1973. The 70 mph (112 km/h) limit was restored on motorways on 29 March 1974 and on all other roads on 8 May 1974.

As an initiative to reduce energy consumption, the national speed limits for otherwise unrestricted single-carriageway and dual-carriageway roads were temporarily reduced to 50 and 60 mph (80 and 97 km/h) respectively (motorway speed limits were left unchanged at 70 mph (112 km/h)) from 14 December 1974. In November 1976, the temporary speed limits were extended at least until the end of May 1977. In April 1977, the government announced that the national speed limits for single-carriageway roads was to be increased to 60 mph (96 km/h) and that the 70 mph (112 km/h) speed limit was to be restored on dual-carriageways on 1 June 1977.

=== 1977–present ===
A speed limiter requirement for mopeds was introduced in 1977, with the speed cap being progressively redefined from 35 mph (56 km/h), to 30 mph (48 km/h), back up to 31 mph (50 km/h) and finally to 28 mph (45 km/h) in the late 2000s.

The 70 mph (112 km/h) speed limit was made permanent in 1978. (Note: Department for Transport (2009), p.179 "60 and 70 mph speed limits are made permanent")

The Road Traffic Regulation Act, which was passed in 1984, includes legislation relating to speed limits. Part VI of the Act defines the default speed limit for 'regularly'-lit roads, gives local authorities powers to create 'speed limit orders', and exempts emergency vehicles from speed limits; the Act also defines speeding offences.

The first 20 mph (32 km/h) speed limits for residential areas were introduced in 1991 (Note: Department for Transport (2009), p.180 "First 20mph zones introduced") and then speed limiters for buses and coaches set at 65 mph (105 km/h) and also for HGVs set at 56 mph (90 km/h) in 1994. (Note: Department for Transport (2009), p.181 "Speed limiter settings lowered to 65 mph for new buses and coaches and to 56 mph for HGVs.") It was made easier for local authorities to introduce a 20 mph (32 km/h) limit in 1999.

In March 2009, the Government consulted on reducing speed limits on rural roads (on which 52% of fatalities had occurred in the previous year) to 50 mph (80 km/h). It explained that 'crashes were more likely on rural parts of the road network, upon most of which the national speed limit of 60 mph (96 km/h) applies'. The Conservative opposition party and the AA were both opposed. The president of the AA said that speed limits that are too low can result in a greater number of crashes and that a "blanket reduction of speed limits would not make roads safer, given that many crashes on rural roads involved only one car".

In February 2010, the Department for Transport undertook a consultation to set a 65 mph (105 km/h) speed limit for all buses, minibuses and coaches with more than eight passenger seats. These proposals were not taken up.

In April 2015, the speed limit for Heavy Goods Vehicles over 7.5 tonnes was increased from 40 to 50 mph (64 to 80 km/h) on single carriageways and from 50 to 60 mph (80 to 97 km/h) on dual carriageways in England and Wales, but not Scotland except the A9 between Perth and Inverness.

In 2022, the Welsh government passed a law to make 20 mph (32 km/h) the default speed limit for built up areas in an effort to reduce the risk of road crashes. The Restricted Roads (20 mph Speed Limit) (Wales) Order 2022 took effect on 17 September 2023.
