= Speed limits in Papua New Guinea =

Speed limits in Papua New Guinea are set by the government. In cities and other built-up areas, a default speed limit of 60 kilometres per hour (37 mph) applies, unless otherwise indicated by speed control signage. In villages outside town centres, the default speed limit is 40 kilometres per hour (25 mph) and 100 kilometres per hour (62 mph) on highways and roads. In the proximity of school zones or playgrounds and near road intersections, vehicles are required to reduce their speed to 25 kilometres per hour (16 mph).

The speed restriction signage used in Papua New Guinea is in accordance with the international system on design specification.
