= International Transport Forum =

OECD inter-governmental organisation

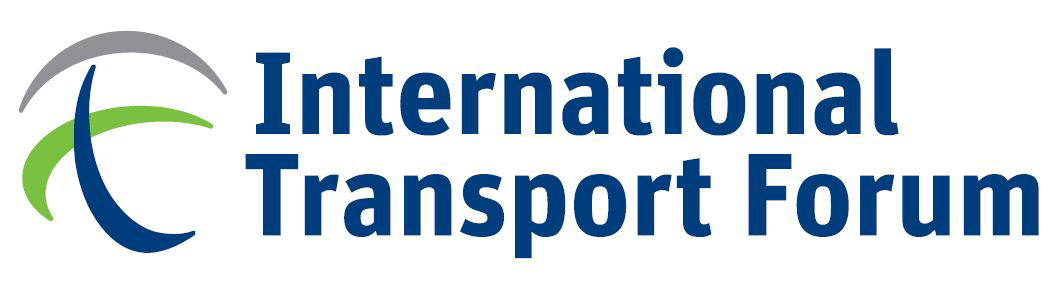

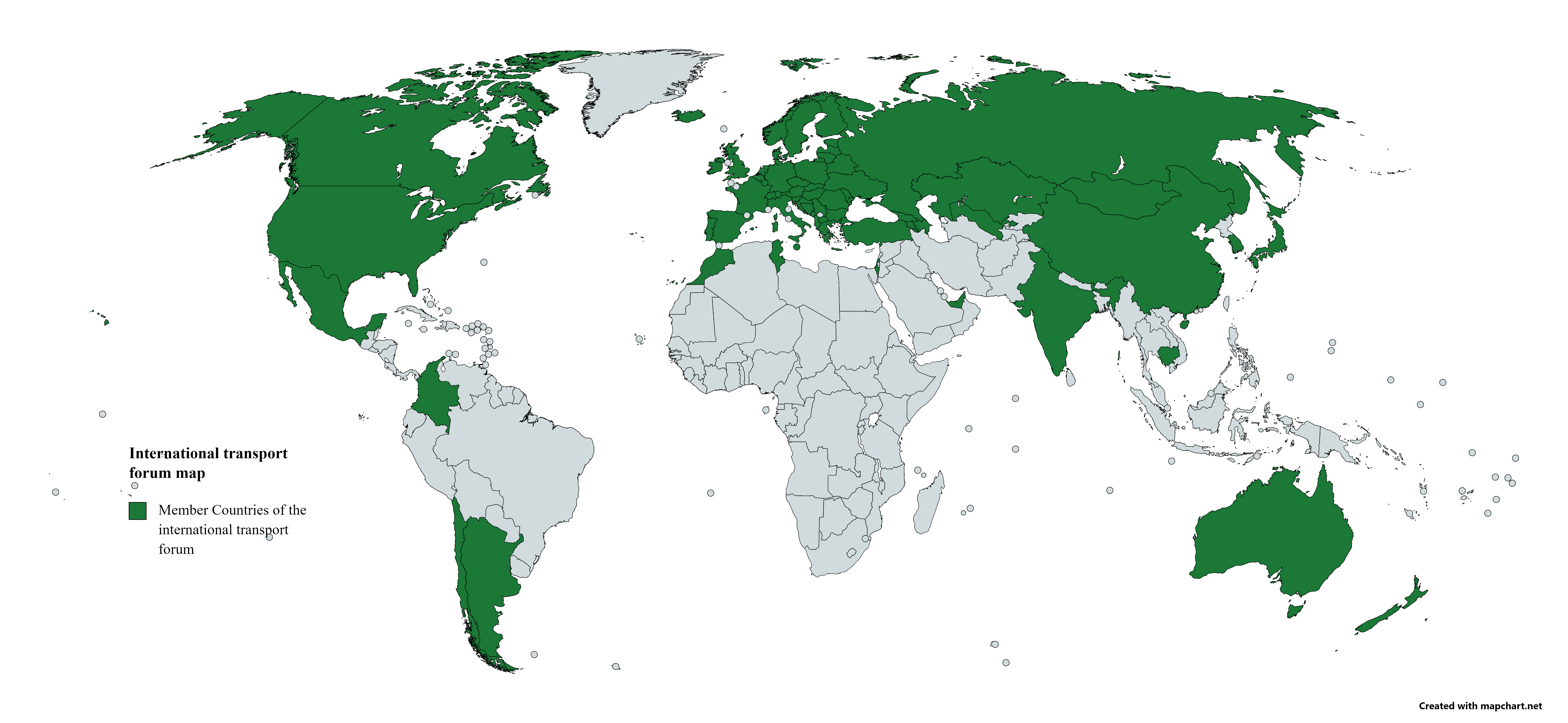
- International Transport Forum members
- Abbreviation: ITF
- Founded: October 1953, 17; 73 years ago
- Founded at: Brussels
- Website: www.itf-oecd.org
- Formerly called: European Conference of Ministers of Transport (ECMT; 1953–2006)

The International Transport Forum (ITF) is an inter-governmental organisation within the OECD (Organisation for Economic Co-operation and Development) system. It is the only global body with a mandate for all modes of transport. It acts as a think tank for transport policy issues and organises the annual global summit of transport ministers. The ITF's motto is "Global dialogue for better transport". Between 1953 and 2007, the organisation had existed for over fifty years as the European Conference of Ministers of Transport (ECMT; French: Conférence européenne des ministres des Transports, CEMT). The organisation is responsible for creating several standards, including the Classification of European Inland Waterways.

== Role ==
The organisation has 69 member countries.

In its think tank role, the organization tries to influence government decision-making and advance its interests.

The ITF maintains the International Road Traffic and Accident Database (IRTAD), a database of statistics related to road safety. IRTAD also acts as a permanent working group of the ITF.

In 2013, the ITF set up a Corporate Partnership Board (CPB) as a mechanism to give its corporate partners access to policy discussions, allowing them to shape public policy in their favor.

== Member states ==
- Albania
- Argentina
- Armenia
- Australia
- Austria
- Azerbaijan
- Belarus
- Belgium
- Bosnia and Herzegovina
- Brazil
- Bulgaria
- Cambodia
- Canada
- China
- Chile
- Colombia
- Costa Rica
- Croatia
- Czech Republic
- Denmark
- Dominican Republic
- Estonia
- Finland
- France
- Georgia
- Germany
- Greece
- Hungary
- Iceland
- India
- Ireland
- Israel
- Italy
- Japan
- Kazakhstan
- South Korea
- Latvia
- Liechtenstein
- Lithuania
- Luxembourg
- North Macedonia
- Malta
- Mexico
- Moldova
- Mongolia
- Montenegro
- Morocco
- Netherlands
- New Zealand
- Norway
- Oman
- Poland
- Portugal
- Romania
- Russia
- Saudi Arabia
- Serbia
- Slovakia
- Slovenia
- Spain
- Sweden
- Switzerland
- Tunisia
- Turkey
- United Arab Emirates
- Ukraine
- United Kingdom
- United States
- Uzbekistan

== Annual Summit ==
Every year, the Annual Summit of the International Transport Forum brings together ministers from member countries and invited countries in Leipzig, Germany, to debate a specific, transport-related theme with leaders from industry, civil society and the research community. At their Annual Summit, transport ministers of ITF member countries adopt an official Ministerial Declaration on policies relating to the Summit theme.

== Governance ==
The International Transport Forum is administratively integrated into the OECD (Organisation for Economic Co-operation and Development), but is politically autonomous and has its own governance structure.

The ITF's highest decision-making organ is the Council of Ministers of Transport (CMT). The CMT unites the Ministers of member countries with responsibility for transport at the Ministerial Session held during the Annual Summit in May of each year. The CMT is chaired by the Presidency country. The Presidency of ITF revolves annually among members, alternating between a European and a non-European country. The Presidency has a leading role in organising the Annual Summit taking place during its tenure. The Presidency is supported by two countries as the First and Second Vice-Presidency. The Vice-Presidency countries traditionally assume the Presidency in the following years.

The direction of the work of the ITF is steered by the Transport Management Board (TMB). The TMB consists of representatives of ITF member countries and meets at least twice per year. The TMB is chaired by the Presidency country. Task Forces formed from TMB members assists the Presidency in preparing the Annual Summits.

The Transport Research Committee (TRC) organizes and oversees longer-term research projects. The TRC consists of representatives of transport ministries (which are sometimes also the TMB representative) and in other instances of delegates from transport-related research agencies of ITF member countries.

The Road Transport Group is a subgroup of European TMB representatives that oversees the distribution of European road freight transport licences under the Multilateral Quota system and monitors compliance with the rules of the Quota system.

The Secretariat is the executive organ of the ITF. It is based at the OECD's headquarters in Paris, France. The Secretariat is led by ITF Secretary-General Young Tae Kim (Korea). Kim was elected by the Council of Ministers of Transport of the International Transport Forum on 1 June 2017 and took office on 21 August 2017. He succeeded José Viegas (Portugal), who had led the ITF's Secretariat from 2012 to 2017. Kim was re-elected to a second five-year mandate on 19 May 2022.. The Secretariat consists of five units: the Secretary-General's Office (OSG); the Research Centre (RC, with teams covering Policy Analysis, Data and Statistics and Modelling); Institutional Relations and Summit (IRS), Communications (COM); and Administration (RMA). The Secretariat has around 70 staff members.

== History ==
The European Conference of Ministers of Transport (ECMT) was established by protocol on 17 October 1953 in Brussels, Belgium. The ECMT remains the legal core of today's International Transport Forum.

The International Transport Forum (ITF) was created by the "Declaration on the Development of the ECMT" ("Dublin Declaration") agreed by Minister of Transport on 31 May 2006 in Dublin, Ireland. The Dublin Declaration evolved the ECMT into a global organisation, with associate member counties of the ECMT (Australia, Canada, Japan, Korea, Mexico, New Zealand, United States) accepting an invitation to become full members.

== See also ==
- OECD – overarching company of ITF
