= Single carriageway =

Road with nothing to separate opposing flows of traffic

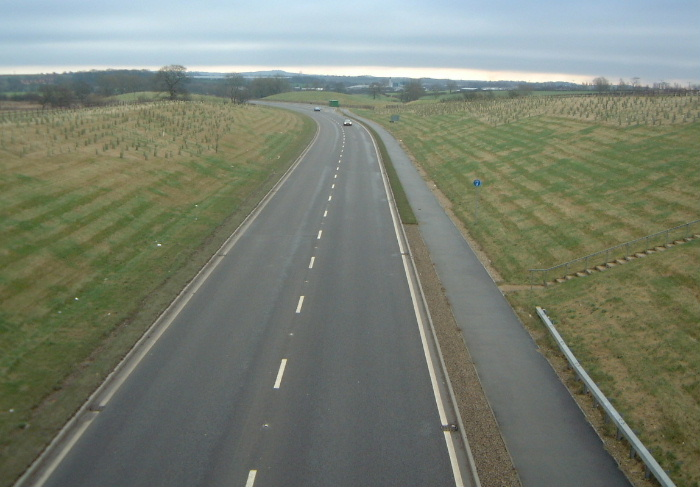
The A511 in Leicestershire, England: a typical single-carriageway arterial road with one traffic lane for each direction (and, in this case, a two-way pedestrian and cycle way alongside)

A single carriageway (British English) is a road with one, two or more lanes arranged within a one carriageway with no central reservation/median strip to separate opposing flows of traffic. A single-track road is a type of single carriageway with a single lane with passing places for traffic in both directions. An undivided highway (American English) is the term used for motorways with two or more lanes with no central reservation/median strip. Road traffic safety is generally worse for high-speed single carriageways than for dual carriageways due to the lack of separation between traffic moving in opposing directions.

== Countries ==
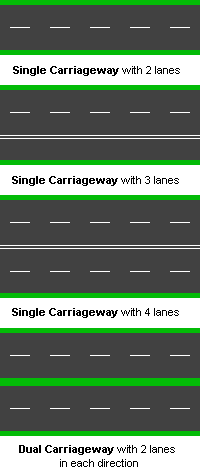
Examples of carriageway variations

=== Ireland ===
The term single carriageway is used for roads in Ireland. Speed limits on single-carriageway roads vary depending on their classification: national primary roads and national secondary roads have a general speed limit of 100 km/h (60 mph), while regional roads and local roads have a general speed limit of 80 km/h (50 mph). In urban areas, the general speed limit is 50 km/h (30 mph).

=== United Kingdom ===
The maximum UK speed limit for single-carriageway roads is lower than the maximum for dual-carriageway roads. The National Speed Limit, which is lower for built-up areas, only applies in places where a lower numeric speed limit is not in place. The UK has one major single-carriageway motorway, the A38(M), but a number of link roads at motorway interchanges are single-carriageway.

=== United States ===
No equivalent term exists in American English. A single carriage motorway in the U.S. would be termed an "undivided highway"; this is likely to mean a multi-lane road with only striping (paint) (but no median) between the two directions of traffic flow. A road with two lanes of traffic moving in opposite directions would be called a two-lane road.

In keeping with the U.S. Department of Transportation's Manual on Uniform Traffic Control Devices (MUTCD), since the early 1970s, all numbered highways in the U.S. are striped by color to show the direction of traffic flow. Two-way undivided roads have a yellow center line (and, if there are baseline shoulder stripes, they are solid white on both sides). This center line may be solid, broken, or a combination of the two, with the different styles, denoting whether passing (which requires a driver to move into the lane used by oncoming traffic) is permitted at a given location.

Multilane roads use broken white lines between lanes moving in the same direction; at least one solid yellow line lies to the left of the lane which borders traffic moving in the opposite direction, and the right sideline is solid white. Drivers can always tell the direction of the traffic flow by looking at the striping coloration.

== Undivided highways with central turn lanes ==
Since successful experiments in the late 1960s, some urban undivided highways in the U.S. have had a central left-turn lane used by both directions of flow. Essentially, this configuration puts a turning lane in the position of where a median would be if the road were divided.

These roads almost always have an odd number of lanes overall, usually five (two lanes in each direction with a central turning lane), but three-lane and seven-lane versions are not uncommon. Central turn lanes are most frequently built in suburban commercial areas where there are a large number of closely spaced driveways (or minor streets).

== See also ==
- Carriageway
- Dual carriageway
