= Raised intersection =

Traffic calming measure

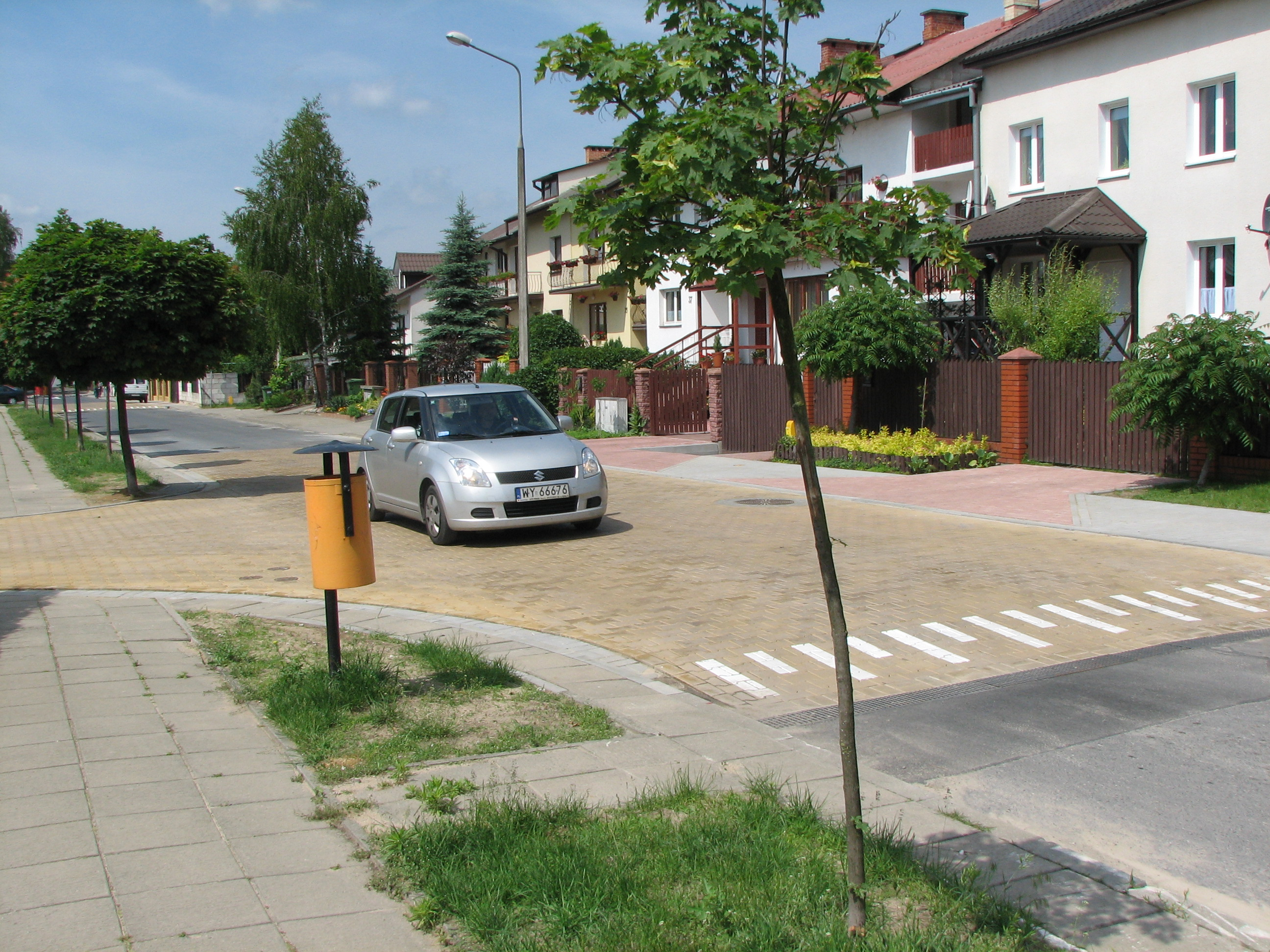
Raised intersection

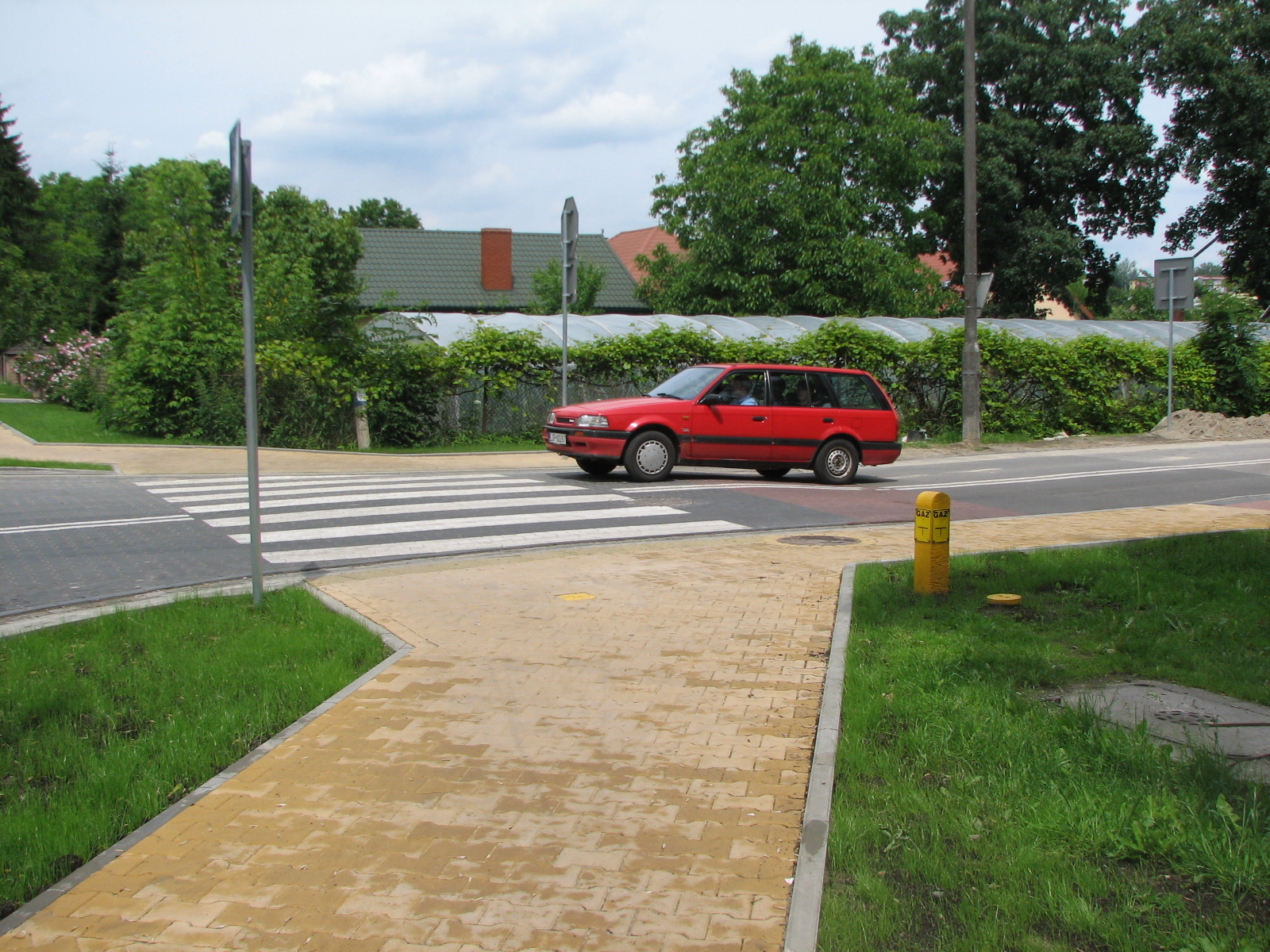
A vehicle entering an elevated intersection

A raised intersection is a structural traffic calming measure that involves raising the roadway to approximately the same level as the sidewalk (8–10 cm [3.1–3.9 in]). The purpose is to calm traffic, and remind drivers to be mindful of cyclists and pedestrians. The color of the raised intersection is often different from the rest of the street to make it easier to see.

The entrance to the plateau is a specially designed ramp that resembles a speed bump (slope of 1:10 to 1:5) so that the intersection is only comfortable to drive through if the vehicle maintains a limited speed (for example from 30 to 50 km/h [19 to 31 mph]). The length of the plateau varies, but is often over 5 m (16 ft) to prevent vehicles with low ground clearance from coming into contact with the ground.

An evaluation in Denmark showed that raised intersections reduced the number of accidents by around 25 percent.
