= International Road Traffic and Accident Database =

Databank for road crashes in different countries

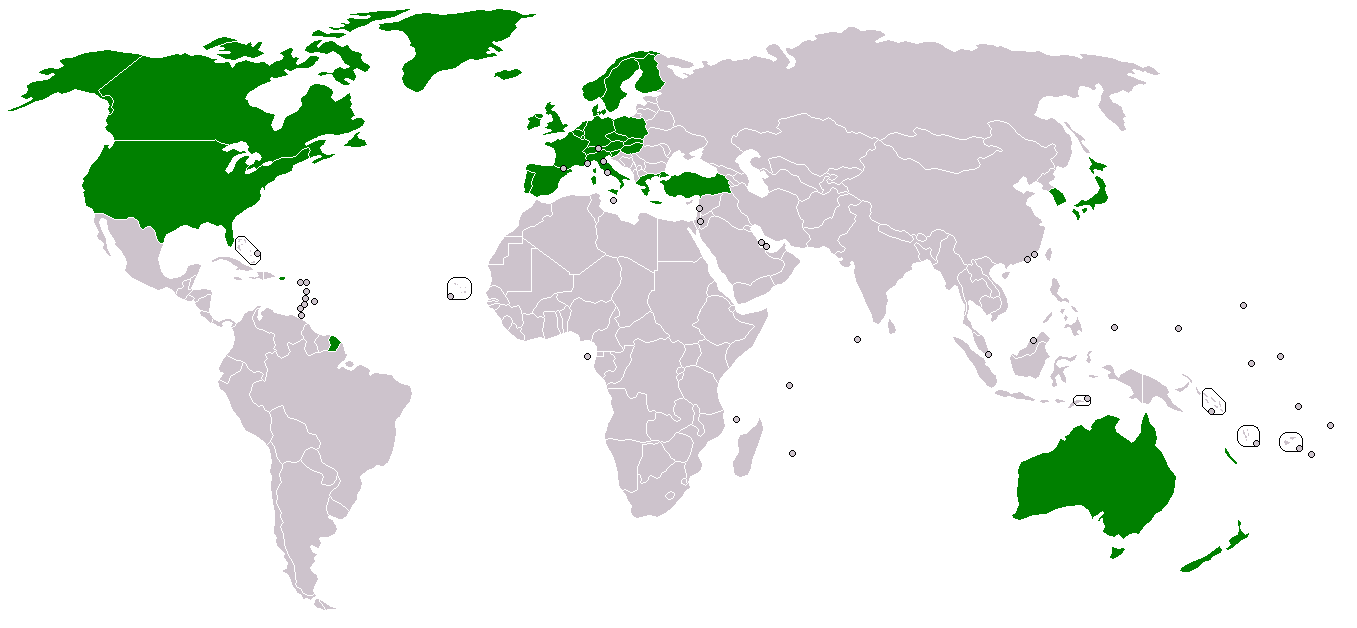
IRTAD participants

The International Road Traffic and Accident Database (IRTAD) is an initiative dedicated to compiling and analyzing global road crash data. It is managed by the International Transport Forum (ITF) under the auspices of its permanent working group, which specializes in road safety, commonly referred to as the IRTAD Group. The primary objective of IRTAD is to provide a robust empirical basis for international comparisons in the field of road safety and to offer data to support the formulation of effective road safety policies.

== Data availability ==
A portion of the data gathered by IRTAD is accessible for free through the OECD statistics website, however the remaining data requires a subscription for access.

== History ==
The IRTAD database was originally started in 1988 by Germany's Federal Institution for Roads (BASt) in response to demands for international comparative data. It was later taken over and expanded by the International Transport Forum and has grown to be an important resource for comparing road safety metrics between countries worldwide, although mostly in the developed world. Every year, the ITF publishes comparative and country-by-country road safety data gathered for the IRTAD database and analysed by the IRTAD Group in the ITF Road Safety Annual Report, informally known as "IRTAD Report".

Over the years, the IRTAD acronym has come to stand not only for the database, but also for the Traffic Safety Data and Analysis Group (usually referred to as IRTAD Group). The IRTAD Group is the International Transport Forum's permanent working group on road safety. It consists of a group of international road safety experts drawn from national road administrations, road safety research institutes, International organizations, automobile associations, insurance companies, car manufacturers and other road safety stakeholders. The IRTAD Group is a major forum for international road safety collaboration and exchange of best practices. Its focus is on improving road safety data as a basis for targeting interventions that are effective in reducing the number of road deaths and serious traffic injuries.

The work of IRTAD, among that of others, has spawned the creation of road safety observatories for different world regions: the Ibero-American Road Safety Observatory (OISEVI), the African Road Safety Observatory, and the South-East Asian Road Safety Observatory. The ITF supports OISEVI through the Spanish-language IRTAD-LAC database and is actively involved in the implementation of the African and South East-Asian observatories.

The genesis of the road safety observatory movement dates back to 2008, when the ITF, via IRTAD, began to facilitate twinning between countries striving to improve their road safety record and countries with high road safety performance. The initial twinning was between Jamaica and the United Kingdom. This work was supported by the World Bank, the Inter-American Development Bank (IADB) and the FIA Foundation. The twinning between Argentina and Spain in 2011 led to the creation of OISEVI. To this day, the ITF supports OISEVI through the Spanish-language IRTAD-LAC database.

In 2006, the ITF set up Safer City Streets, a global traffic safety network for cities that replicates the successful IRTAD approach for urban road safety.
