= Restricted Roads (20 mph Speed Limit) (Wales) Order 2022 =

Welsh road safety legislation

- Statutory Instrument
- Senedd Cymru
- Long title: An Order made by the Welsh Ministers under section 81(2) of the Road Traffic Regulation Act 1984 to reduce the general speed limit for restricted roads from 30 miles per hour to 20 miles per hour in relation to Wales
- Citation: SI 2022/800 (W. 178)
- Introduced by: Julie James
- Territorial extent: Wales

Dates
- Made: 13 July 2022
- Commencement: 17 September 2023

Other legislation
- Made under: Road Traffic Regulation Act 1984

Status: Current legislation

Text of statute as originally enacted

Revised text of statute as amended

The Restricted Roads (20 mph Speed Limit) (Wales) Order 2022 (SI 2022/800) is a statutory instrument made by the Welsh Ministers under the Road Traffic Regulation Act 1984. The order reduces the default speed limit on restricted roads in Wales from 30 mph to 20 mph, making Wales the first nation in the United Kingdom, and one of the first countries worldwide, to introduce a national default 20 mph limit. It was approved by Senedd Cymru in July 2022 and came into force on 17 September 2023, affecting around 35% of Welsh roads by length.

The policy was developed following a government-commissioned task force and featured in both Welsh Labour and Plaid Cymru’s 2021 Senedd election manifestos. Supporters, including public health experts and road safety campaigners, argue that the change will reduce collisions, save lives, and encourage more walking and cycling. Opponents, including the Welsh Conservatives and campaign groups, have criticised the economic costs and claimed widespread public opposition.

Implementation of the policy has been highly contentious, prompting the largest petition in Senedd history and becoming a significant political issue in Wales. Early monitoring has indicated reductions in traffic speeds and road casualties, though the economic impact remains debated. The legislation has also attracted international attention, aligning with recommendations from the World Health Organisation and similar reforms in Spain and other European countries.

== Background ==
=== Legislative framework ===
Section 81(1) of the Road Traffic Regulation Act 1984 provides that it shall not be lawful for a person to drive a motor vehicle on a restricted road at a speed exceeding 30 miles per hour. Under the act, a road is considered 'restricted' if it has a system of street lighting with lamps placed not more than 200 yards apart. Section 81(2) enables the national authority (being the Welsh Ministers in relation to Wales) by order to increase or reduce the rate of speed fixed by section 81(1).

The power to set national speed limits for restricted roads was devolved to Welsh Ministers through the Wales Act 2017. The Wales Act 2017 was enacted in 2018 and devolved the setting of national speed limits for restricted roads to the Welsh ministers with certain provisos on consulting with the UK Secretary of State and approved by a resolution in the National Assembly for Wales.

=== Policy development ===
Proposals to introduce 20mph were included in Welsh Labour and Plaid Cymru 2021 Senedd election manifestos, and subsequently the new Welsh Government's Programme for Government. The policy was developed following the work of the Welsh 20mph Task Force Group, established in May 2019 to examine the outcomes and practical actions needed to implement a national 20 mph default speed limit.

The "Final Report" was published in July 2020 and included the case for change and 20 recommendations on how to implement such a change. On 15 July 2020 the Senedd debated the findings of the report in a plenary session and passed motion NDM7355 supporting the Welsh Government's intention to set a national 20mph limit for restricted roads subject to subsequent approval by resolution of Senedd.

== Provisions ==
=== Core provision ===
The order reduces the general speed limit for restricted roads from 30 miles per hour to 20 miles per hour in relation to Wales. Accordingly, the reference in section 81(1) of the Road Traffic Regulation Act 1984 to "30 miles per hour" is to be interpreted as a reference to "20 miles per hour".

=== Exceptions process ===
The order does not preclude local authorities from designating exceptions where 30 mph remains appropriate. Highway authorities retain their powers under sections 82(2) and 84(1)(a) of the Road Traffic Regulation Act 1984 to direct that specific roads should not be treated as restricted roads or to impose different speed limits through traffic regulation orders.

The Welsh Government has provided guidance to help highway authorities make decisions about exceptions. In July 2024, new guidance was provided to highway authorities to help them assess which roads the speed limit could return to 30mph.

== Legislative process ==
=== Consultation ===
Before making the order, the Welsh Ministers were required to consult with the Secretary of State for Transport under section 81(5) of the Road Traffic Regulation Act 1984. The Secretary of State for Transport was consulted on 7 April 2022. The Minister for Roads, Buses and Places responded on behalf of the Secretary of State on 11 May 2022 indicating that she had no comments to make on the proposed order.

A 12-week public consultation ran from 9 July 2021 to 1 October 2021. 6,018 online responses were received by the Welsh Government in the consultation period. 47% were in favour of reducing the speed limit and 53% were against. However, the majority of organisations—22 of 25—broadly supported the Welsh Government's proposal to reduce the speed limit.

=== Senedd scrutiny ===
The draft order was laid before Senedd Cymru on 21 June 2022. The motion to approve the draft Order was debated in a plenary session on 12 July 2022, where it was approved by 39 votes to 15. The Order was made by the Welsh Ministers on 13 July 2022 following the resolution of Senedd Cymru to approve the draft.

=== Implementation timeline ===
There was a longer period than usual between the making of the order and its coming into force on 17 September 2023. This lengthy preparation period was required to enable traffic authorities to review their road networks and determine whether they needed to make orders under the Road Traffic Regulation Act 1984 for restricted roads where they considered that the default speed limit of 20 miles per hour would not be appropriate.

== Implementation and impact ==
=== Scope ===
The policy affects restricted roads, which are usually in residential and built-up areas where there are lots of people. They often have street lights placed no more than 200 yards apart. Currently, approximately 35% of Welsh roads by length have a 20mph speed limit under the policy.

=== Costs ===
The Welsh Government's Regulatory Impact Assessment estimated the direct financial cost at £32.5 million over the period 2022-2027. The main economic dis-benefit was identified as relating to increased journey times from lower average vehicle speeds, with a central estimate of £6.4 billion over 30 years.

=== Monitoring and evaluation ===
Eight trial 20mph areas were implemented during 2021/22, referred to as Phase 1 of the 20mph programme. Research commissioned by Public Health Wales in 2022 estimates the new 20mph default limit could save more than 100 lives over a decade. In March 2023, the Phase 1 Interim Monitoring Report found that 64% vehicles were travelling at or below 24mph compared to 45% pre-implementation, and that mean speed was reduced by 3mph.

== Public and political response ==
=== Public opinion ===
Public attitudes have fluctuated. The Welsh Government consulted on the proposals in the summer of 2021, with 47% of respondents supporting the change, and 53% opposed. Following implementation, there has been significant public opposition.

=== Petitions ===
The Welsh Government's 20mph default speed limit policy has been controversial. The Petitions Committee considered the biggest petition in Senedd history which called on the Welsh Government to scrap the policy. It attracted a record breaking 469,571 signatures. The petition was debated in the Senedd on 22 May 2024.

==== Petition integrity ====
The petition attracted some scrutiny regarding its conduct, with allegations about duplicate signatures and the use of non-Welsh postcodes. However, following an investigation, the Senedd stated there was no evidence of "large-scale duplication or tampering". The investigation found that approximately 94% of the signatures came from people in Wales with valid postcodes and email addresses, with some small scale duplication and "rather bizarre names" such as "Rupert the Bear".

A Senedd spokesperson said: "We allow signatures from outside of Wales, however, the majority of signatures to our petitions, including this one, are from Wales. Each signatory must provide and verify an email address. We have no evidence of large-scale duplication or tampering."

=== Political response ===
The Senedd rejected a motion calling for the policy to be reversed, instead agreeing an amendment welcoming "the Welsh Government's recognition of the need to refine the implementation". Following changes in leadership, the new First Minister, Vaughan Gething, said the Welsh Government had "got some of the communication side wrong" around the policy.

The Welsh Government subsequently established a review team, led by Phil Jones (who also led the Welsh Government's 2019 task force on 20mph speed limits), to examine how the guidance has been applied. In 2024, the Welsh Government announced changes to the implementation, with the Cabinet Secretary for North Wales and Transport, Ken Skates MS, suggesting there was a "need to make sure 20 mph is truly targeted" in places "where children and the elderly are at risk".

==== Conservative opposition ====
The Welsh Conservatives have been at the forefront of opposition to the policy since implementation. Shadow Transport Minister Natasha Asghar has consistently campaigned for the policy to be scrapped, describing it as "Labour's disastrous 20mph rollout". The party argued that the policy would cost the Welsh economy up to £9 billion and criticised the £32 million implementation cost.

Asghar has advocated for a "targeted approach" to 20mph limits, supporting them "around schools, hospitals, places of worship and high streets" but opposing the blanket implementation. In September 2024, she was formally censured by the Senedd for using the term "blanket" to describe the policy, which the standards committee found to be "imprecise and inaccurate".

The Welsh Conservatives have pledged to scrap the policy if they win power in Wales, with party leader Darren Millar and former leader Andrew RT Davies both calling for its repeal.

==== UK Conservative manifesto pledge ====
In their 2024 UK general election manifesto, the Conservative Party pledged to reverse Wales' 20mph policy through Westminster legislation if they won the election. The manifesto stated: "We will expand our Backing Drivers' Bill to cover Wales, reversing Labour's blanket 20mph speed limit by requiring local consent for 20mph zones and giving local communities the legal right to challenge existing zones."

However, this pledge faced criticism from Welsh politicians who argued that transport policy is devolved to the Welsh Government and that Westminster intervention would undermine devolution. First Minister Vaughan Gething described the proposal as an "enormous assault" on devolution.

==== Plaid Cymru position ====
Plaid Cymru has taken a more nuanced position on the policy. While supporting the principle of 20mph limits, the party has acknowledged problems with implementation. During a September 2023 Senedd debate, Plaid Cymru's transport spokesperson Delyth Jewell said there were "problems with how the new 20 mph limits are being rolled out" and called for "continuous reviews of the implementation of the policy and to empower local authorities to be able to make further exemptions".

Plaid Cymru's Westminster leader Liz Saville Roberts rejected the Conservative manifesto pledge to overturn the policy, stating: "The UK government has no power over speed limits in Wales. The wheels are coming off Rishi Sunak's campaign and he's hoping that this latest populist tactic will get him back on track."

==== Reform UK stance ====
Reform UK has positioned itself as opposed to the 20mph policy and has pledged to repeal it if the party came to power in Wales. A Reform UK Wales spokesman confirmed the party's opposition to the default 20mph speed limit and commitment to repealing the policy. The party has attracted support from some anti-20mph campaigners who have become disillusioned with the Welsh Conservatives' approach.

=== Ministerial comments ===
Speaking after the Senedd vote in July 2022, Julie James said: "I am delighted that the move to 20mph has received cross-party support across the Welsh Parliament today. The evidence is clear, decreasing speeds not only reduces accidents and saves lives, but helps improve people's quality of life - making our streets and communities a safer and more welcoming place for cyclists and pedestrians, whilst helping reduce our environmental impact."

=== Safety outcomes and analysis ===
Research conducted by the Transport Research Institute at Edinburgh Napier University, in conjunction with Public Health Wales, estimated the 20mph default speed limit would save more than 100 lives over a decade and that 14,000 casualties in total could be avoided. The research suggested the policy could provide around £100 million in cost savings in the first year alone as a direct result of fewer deaths and injuries.

Earlier research published in 2017 by Public Health Wales estimated that if all 30mph limit roads in Wales became 20mph limits, approximately 6–10 lives would be saved and 1,200–2,000 casualties avoided each year, with a prevention value of £58–£94 million.

==== Early casualty data ====
Preliminary casualty data following implementation has shown reductions in road casualties. Welsh Government data published in June 2024 showed reduced casualties on 20/30mph roads since the introduction of 20mph in September 2023. Also in June 2024, insurance company esure reported that vehicle damage claims had fallen by 20 per cent in Wales since the introduction of the 20 mph limit, during times of the year when such claims normally rise. Analysis by the 20's Plenty for Us campaign group indicated a 26% reduction in casualties on 20/30mph roads in the first twelve months, with 630 fewer casualties compared to the previous year.

Data for the first full quarter following implementation showed a 32% reduction in casualties on restricted roads compared to the same period in the previous year. This included five fatalities on 20mph and 30mph roads, compared to 11 in the same period in 2023.

== Academic analysis and expert assessment ==
=== Transport Research Institute findings ===
Research from Edinburgh Napier University's Transport Research Institute, conducted in conjunction with Public Health Wales, estimated the Welsh policy would save more than 100 lives over a decade and avoid 14,000 casualties in total, with cost savings of around £100 million in the first year alone. However, the Welsh Government's own Regulatory Impact Assessment acknowledged "some academic debate" about the methodology for calculating economic impacts, particularly regarding journey time valuations.

=== Evidence base limitations ===
Academic reviews have highlighted limitations in the evidence base. Research from Queen's University distinguished between 20mph zones (with traffic calming measures) and 20mph limits (signage-only), finding "clear evidence" that zones reduced collisions and casualties but "a lack of evidence on the effectiveness of 20mph limits". A 2018 UK Government report found "insufficient evidence" that 20mph limits made a "significant change" in collisions and accidents, contrasting with Welsh Government-commissioned research that found "moderate to strong" evidence of casualty reductions.

Sustrans, the walking and cycling charity, has noted that opposition frequently misrepresents research findings, particularly citing the Belfast study to argue against broader implementations despite the study's authors emphasising the importance of scale and context.

== Comparative context and international perspective ==
Wales' implementation of a national default 20mph speed limit places it at the forefront of an international trend towards lower urban speed limits, but its approach and scale remain relatively unique.

=== International precedents ===
The Welsh policy aligns with global recommendations from the World Health Organisation and the United Nations, which endorse 20mph (30 km/h) speed limits where people mix with motor vehicles unless strong evidence exists that higher speeds are safe. This position was reinforced by the 3rd Global Ministerial Conference on Road Safety held in Stockholm in 2020, which agreed to "mandate a maximum road travel speed of 20mph in areas where vulnerable road users and vehicles mix in a frequent and planned manner".

Spain implemented a similar nationwide policy in 2019, changing the speed limit to 30 km/h (approximately 19 mph) on most urban roads. Since implementation, Spain has reported 20% fewer urban road deaths, with fatalities reduced by 34% for cyclists and 24% for pedestrians.

=== UK context ===
Within the UK, Wales represents the first national-level implementation, though extensive local schemes operate elsewhere. Transport for London has found significant results from its wide-area scheme, with collisions falling 25% over two years to June 2022, and those resulting in death or serious injury down 24%. Bristol's city-wide implementation, often cited as a model, showed statistically significant reductions in average traffic speeds of 2.7 mph and reduced fatal, serious and slight injuries, with estimated cost savings of over £15 million per year.

Nearly half of all UK local authorities by population have implemented some wide area 20mph zones, with approximately 20 million people in England living in such areas. Portsmouth was among the first to introduce a "Total 20" approach in 2007, followed by Oxford, Bristol, Warrington, and London Borough of Islington.

=== Scottish developments ===
Scotland is following Wales' lead with plans for 20mph to become the norm in built-up areas by 2025. The Scottish Government's strategy involves working with local authorities to implement widespread 20mph limits, with Transport Scotland noting that default 20mph limits will be "rolled out to every road in built-up areas across Scotland by 2025".

The Scottish Borders implemented permanent 20mph limits in January 2023 following a successful two-year trial that showed average speeds reduced by 3mph, with some areas seeing reductions of up to 6mph. Scottish transport policy now recognises that 20mph limits align with global best practice where "30km/h is the accepted norm in communities" in countries including Denmark, Norway, Netherlands, Sweden, Switzerland, France, Belgium, Austria, Germany and Japan.

=== Unique aspects of the Welsh approach ===
Wales' implementation is distinguished by several factors: it represents the first country-wide default speed limit change rather than a city or regional approach; it operates within a devolved political system where transport policy is separate from the rest of the UK; and it has generated unprecedented public opposition compared to other jurisdictions, with the largest petition in Welsh parliamentary history. The scale of public debate and political controversy appears markedly different from implementations elsewhere, where academic studies suggest there has generally been broader acceptance of 20mph policies.

== See also ==
- Road speed limit
- Road speed limits in the United Kingdom
- Transport in Wales
