= Built-up area (traffic management) =

Area in which road speed limit is reduced due to development

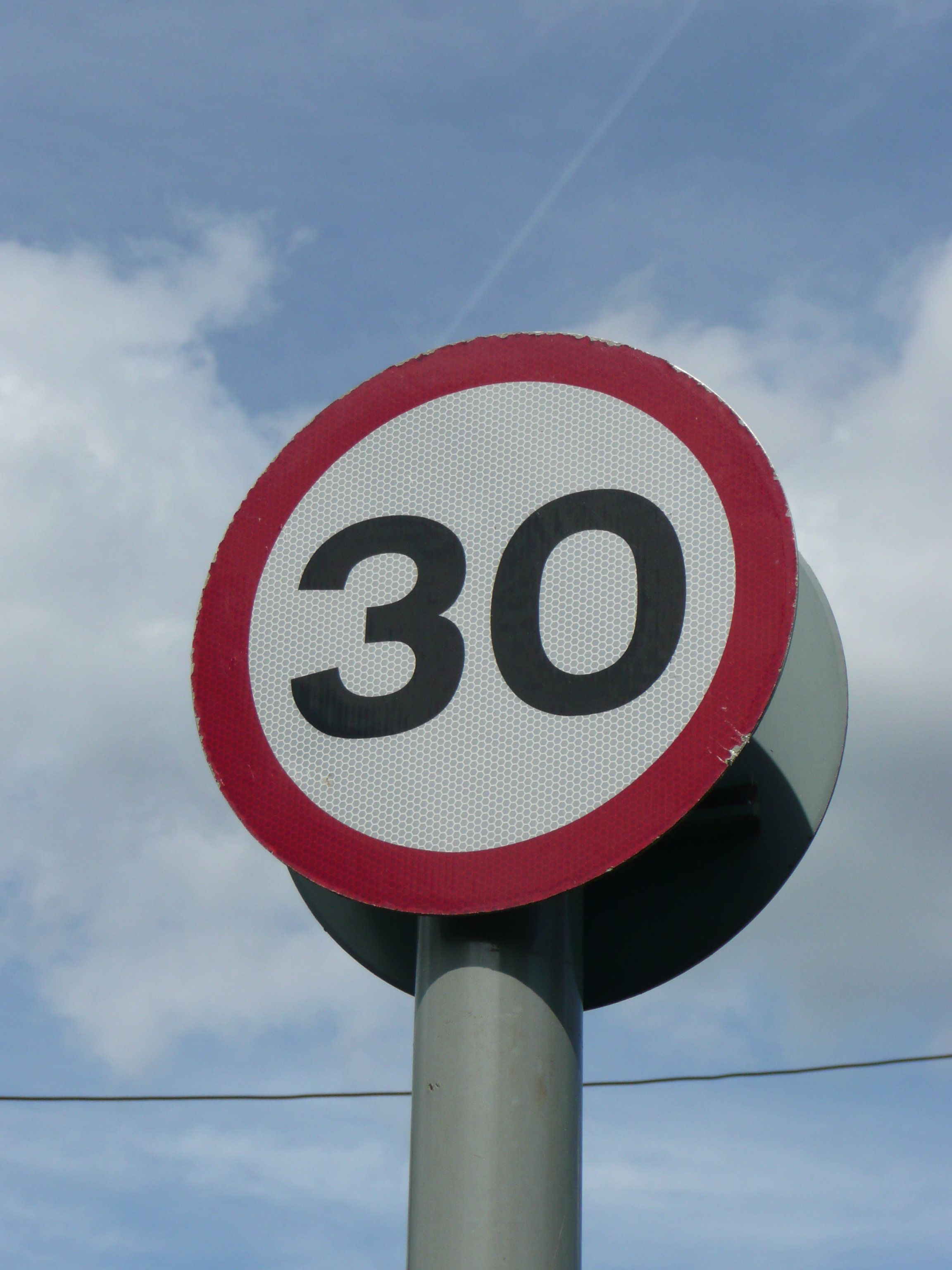
A 30 mph speed limit reminder road sign. Used when there is insufficient street lighting for a road to legally have an automatic 30 mph speed limit.

The concept of a built-up area is used in the road traffic regulations of many countries to designate zones where additional restrictions apply due to the presence of dense roadside development and regular pedestrian activity. These areas are typically subject to reduced speed limits—often around 50 kilometres per hour (31 mph) or 30 miles per hour (48 km/h)—as well as additional controls, such as parking and noise. The primary aim of these regulations is to enhance road safety, reduce environmental impact, and protect the quality of life for those living or moving within such areas.

In some—but not all—jurisdictions employing the concept, a specific 'built-up area' sign is specified in the applicable regulations to inform road users of entry to and exit from a built-up areas in which different restrictions apply. This, for instance, exists in France and Germany, but not in the United Kingdom. Some countries may have similar signs indicating place names that have no regulatory purpose.

Other indicators of built-up area status are used; for instance, the United Kingdom delineates a status of 'restricted roads' on which a lower default speed limit applies based on the presence of street lighting.

== International law ==
Article 18 of the Vienna Convention on Road Signs and Signals of 1968 specifies that built-up area signs be placed at the entry and exit points of built-up areas. It allows for domestic legislation to attach regulations to built-up area signs, which then apply throughout all built-up areas defined by the signs, but it does not specify which regulations or require that any be specified.

== In France ==
French road traffic law defines the concept of agglomération, which is equivalent to a built-up area in English. An agglomération is defined by entry and exit signage indicating the name of the agglomération.

Within an agglomération, the maximum speed limit is 50 kilometres per hour (31 mph).

== In the United Kingdom ==
In the UK Highway Code for England, Scotland and Northern Ireland, a built-up area is a settled area in which the speed limit of a road is automatically 30 mph (48 km/h). In Wales, it has been reduced to 20 mph (32 km/h) since 2023. These roads are known as 'restricted roads' and are identified by the presence of street lights.

=== History ===
In 1930, the concept of specific regulation for roads within built-up areas appears. It defines the road as a road within built-up area if some system of street lighting exists at less than 200 yards (183 meters) from that road, unless decided other way by the local authority and written on traffic signs.

The Road Traffic Regulation Act 1984 is the basis of the current law.

In 2018, mainland UK became a member of the Vienna convention on road traffic, which considers that the concept of built-up area should be defined by the domestic legislation.

=== Legal definition ===
In August 2006, the Department for Transport issued new guidance relating to speed limits. It states that:

Section 82(1)(a) (of the Road Traffic Regulation Act 1984 (RTRA 1984)) defines a restricted road in England and Wales as a road which is provided with "a system of street lighting furnished by means of lamps placed not more than 200 yards apart". Section 81 specifically makes it an offence for a person to drive a motor vehicle at a speed of more than 30 mph on a restricted road.

"Street lighting" is further defined as follows:

As set out in paragraph 45, it is generally recognised that a 'system' of street lighting could be three or more lamps spaced not more than 183 metres apart. However, street lighting (for the purposes of determining whether or not a road is a restricted) is not necessarily limited to street lamps, but may extend to lighting provided by authorities or parish councils.

To avoid confusion that could arise if some 30 mph zones were 'street-lit' and some were not, DfT guidance goes onto say:

Direction 11 of The Traffic Signs Regulations and General Directions 2002 (TSRGD 2002) defines the requirements for the placing of speed-limit repeater signs. This states that speed-limit repeater signs cannot be placed along a road on which there is carriageway lighting not more than 183 metres apart and which is subject to a 30 mph speed limit. The Department will not make exceptions to this rule.

This has led to the conclusion that:

This means it should be assumed that, unless an order has been made and the road is signed to the contrary, a 30 mph speed limit applies where there are three or more lamps throwing light on the carriageway and placed not more than 183 metres apart.

British Standards on "Road Lighting" are contained in the following documents: BS EN13201-1-2004; BS 5489:1:2003

=== Legislation ===
Most road traffic law pertaining to speed limits is contained in the Road Traffic Regulation Act 1984 (RTRA 1984). Other relevant legislation includes the Highways Act 1980, where Sections 90A-F cover road humps and Sections 90G-I cover other traffic-calming works. Part VI of the RTRA 1984 deals specifically with speed limits, with Sections 81–84 dealing with different speed limits and the speed-limit order-making process.

=== In Northern Ireland ===
In Northern Ireland, the Highway Code of Northern Ireland has only three references to the "built-up area" and does not define it.

In Northern Ireland, the Highway Code forbids the use of the horn within built-up area between 2330 and 0700, except in case of danger, consistently with article 28 of the Vienna convention.

In Northern Ireland, the Highway Code forbids speeds higher than 30 mph in built-up areas.

== See also ==
- Built-up area
- Speed limit
