= 2023 in Wales =

- Centuries: 19th; 20th; 21st
- Decades: 2000s; 2010s; 2020s
- See also: List of years in Wales; Timeline of Welsh history 2023 in The United Kingdom England Scotland Elsewhere Welsh football: 2022–23 • 2023–24

Events from the year 2023 in Wales.

== Incumbents ==
- First Minister – Mark Drakeford
- Secretary of State for Wales – David T. C. Davies
- Archbishop of Wales – Andy John, Bishop of Bangor
- Archdruid of the National Eisteddfod of Wales – Myrddin ap Dafydd
- National Poet of Wales – Hanan Issa

== Events ==
=== January ===
- 1 January – The 2023 New Year Honours List includes footballer Sophie Ingle (OBE) and academic Colin Riordan (CBE). Politicians Chris Bryant and Julian Lewis receive knighthoods.
- 4 January – Public and Commercial Services Union workers begin the first of their 6-day strikes due to issues regarding salary, pensions, job security and redundancy terms. Driving tests are cancelled in seventeen testing centres across Wales.
- 10 January – Hungarian airline Wizz Air announces they will cease all operations to and from Cardiff Airport amid challenging macro-economic environment and high operational costs.
- 14 January – 250 members of the Welsh language campaign group Cymdeithas yr Iaith gather to protest in Carmarthen aiming to promote greater support for the Welsh language and calling for more Welsh-medium schools to be established across Wales. Welsh folk singer Dafydd Iwan performs Yma o Hyd and speaks in support of the movement.
- 16 January – The NAHT Cymru and NEU trade unions announce a four-day walkout by teachers in a dispute over pay. NAHT Cymru wants a pay rise that matches the on-going inflation surge plus a 5% rise. The NEU is asking for a 12% adjustment.
- 19 January – Local authorities receive £208m for 11 projects from round two of UK Government's Levelling Up Fund attracting criticism from the Welsh Government as Wales remains £1.1bn worse off than previous European Union inequality schemes, while Plaid Cymru critiques the system by which the money is distributed calling it arbitrary and ad-hoc.
- 24 January – The Welsh Government launches a 12-week consultation process on plans to introduce mandatory licensing for tattoo artists, body piercers and cosmetic clinics, which will make Wales the first UK nation to introduce a register for practitioners.
- 28 January – The Welsh Government announces that Clare Drakeford, the wife of First Minister Mark Drakeford, has died suddenly.
- 30 January – Dr Sarah Myhill, a private practitioner from Powys, who posted false claims about COVID-19 vaccines online, is banned from practising for nine months after a hearing conducted by the Medical Practitioners Tribunal Service.

=== February ===
- 14 February –
  - All major road building projects in Wales, including the proposed Third Menai Crossing, are scrapped amid concerns about the environment.
  - The BBC Welsh Service (now BBC Cymru Wales) marks the 100th anniversary of the BBC's first broadcast in Wales.
- 16 February – The funeral of Clare Drakeford is held in Cardiff, and attended by senior politicians.
  - The Wales government announces additional election reforms for the 2026 Senedd election, such as candidates needing to be resident in Wales.
- 20 February – Three days of strikes involving almost half of ambulance workers in Wales begin, with members of the GMB union walking out on 20 February, and members of the Unite union walking out on 21 and 22 February.
- 21 February – Ambulance workers belonging to the Unite union call two strikes for 6 and 10 March.
- 22 February – The NASUWT teaching union rejects a revised pay offer from the Welsh Government.
- 23 February – The National Health Service in Wales misses its first post-COVID target for reducing the backlog of outpatients waiting for an appointment, with 75,000 people waiting for a year or more when there should be none.
- 24 February –
  - Devil's Gulch, a popular walking spot in the Elan Valley, is reopened to the public five years after it was closed following a rockfall.
  - An earthquake measuring 3.7 magnitude strikes Brynmawr, Blaenau Gwent at 11.59pm.

=== March ===
- 3 March
  - The Unite and GMB unions call off a planned strike by the Welsh Ambulance Service scheduled for Monday 6 March after "significant progress" in talks with the Welsh Government.
  - The final of the Cân i Gymru (Song for Wales) 2023 competition is won by Dylan Morris, with the song "Patagonia".
- 6 March – Three people are found dead nearly two days after being reported missing, after their car is spotted by a police helicopter, having crashed into trees in the outskirts of Cardiff. Two survivors are taken to hospital in a critical condition.
- 8 March –
  - Members of the Welsh Ambulance Service belonging to the Unite union call off a strike scheduled for Friday 10 March following "progress" with officials from the Welsh Government.
  - In what is believed to be the first case of its kind in the UK, the widow of a nurse who died as a result of COVID-19 is to sue the National Health Service in Wales. Linda Roberts, the widow of Gareth Roberts, who had Type 2 diabetes, plans the legal action after a coroner found that he died as a result of "industrial disease".
- 10 March – Members of the National Education Union in Wales call off two strikes planned for 15 and 16 March after receiving a new pay offer from the Welsh Government.
- 13 March – A man is killed in a gas explosion at a house in Morriston area of Swansea. He is subsequently identified as a 68-year-old pensioner.
- 16 March – The Welsh Government bans the TikTok app from all its official devices amid concerns about its security.
- 23 March – Members of the National Education Union vote to accept a pay offer from the Welsh Government worth 8%, ending their industrial dispute.
- 26 March – Welsh rugby clubs vote for major governance changes to the Welsh Rugby Union board following an extraordinary general meeting at their headquarters in Port Talbot.

=== April ===
- 8 April – Llys Rhosyr, a mediaeval court of the Prince of Gwynedd, has been bought by Cadw, the Welsh Government's historic environment service.
- 13 April – Andrew Edwards, a councillor representing a ward in Haverfordwest, is suspended from the Conservative Party after his voice is identified on a recording in which someone stating a belief that white men should have black slaves.
- 17 April –
  - Brecon Beacons National Park announces it will be known in future by its Welsh name, Bannau Brycheiniog National Park, with immediate effect.
  - Employees of the Welsh Government and Natural Resources Wales belonging to the Prospect union announce plans to strike on 11 May and 7 June over pay.
- 24 April – The Criminal Cases Review Commission confirms it has received a request from Pembrokeshire serial killer John William Cooper for a review of his conviction for double murders committed in 1985 and 1999.
- 25 April –
  - Following a trial at Swansea Crown Court, Kyle Bevan is sentenced to life imprisonment with a minimum of 28 years for the murder of his two-year-old stepdaughter Lola James. Sinead James, Lola's mother, is sentenced to six years for causing or allowing her daughter's death at her home in Haverfordwest, Pembrokeshire, in 2020.
  - The Welsh Government issues an apology over the forced adoption of thousands of children of unmarried mothers during the 1950s, 60s and 70s.
- 26 April – Ffos-y-Fran near Merthyr Tydfil, the UK's largest opencast mine, must close after 16 years of excavation after an application to extend its operation was rejected.
- 28 April – Prime Minister Rishi Sunak tells the Welsh Conservatives that no more powers should be devolved to the Senedd and the Welsh Government as voters do not want politicians focused on "constitutional tinkering".

=== May ===
- 2 May
  - South Wales Police confirm that human remains found in secluded woodland in Swansea are those of Russell Scozzi, who disappeared in 2002.
  - An independent investigation is launched after the broadcasting union BECTU makes allegations of "bullying and a toxic culture" at Welsh-language TV channel S4C.
- 3 May – An independent review into the internal culture of Plaid Cymru identifies several issues within the party, and concludes that it needs to "detoxify a culture of harassment, bullying and misogyny".
- 4 May
  - Education Minister Jeremy Miles says he will write to the UK government to remind them to accurately translate into the Welsh language after a Welsh language citizen's oath asked people to curse at God.
  - Senedd presiding officer Elin Jones confirms she will not be attending the coronation of Charles III because "as a republican" it is "for others to celebrate a coronation".
- 7 May – Leaked text message conversations obtained by the BBC show members of Plaid Cymru discussed whether the party's leader, Adam Price, was fit for office in November 2022, and debated whether he should be removed from the post.
- 10 May – Adam Price announces his resignation as leader of Plaid Cymru after a report found a culture of misogyny, harassment and bullying in the party.
- 11 May – Llyr Gruffydd is appointed interim leader of Plaid Cymru following the resignation of Adam Price.
- 12 May – NHS workers belonging to the Unison trade union vote to accept a 5% pay increase from the Welsh Government along with a one-off payment worth between £900 and £1,190.
- 18 May – Data released by NHS Wales shows that 30,000 people have been waiting for more than two years for hospital treatment after being referred.
- 19 May – The Court of Appeal increases the prison sentences of two parents who were previously sentenced for neglecting their 16-year-old morbidly obese daughter, who died in squalor in October 2020.
- 20 May – Two European monarchs, King Felipe VI of Spain and King Willem-Alexander of the Netherlands, accompanied by their wives, Queen Letizia and Queen Máxima, attend a students' awards ceremony at Atlantic College in the Vale of Glamorgan, at which their daughters, Leonor, Princess of Asturias, and Princess Alexia of the Netherlands, receive certificates.
- 23 May – A riot takes place in Cardiff after news of the deaths of two teenagers on an electric bike is published on social media. The following day, after the discovery of video evidence, South Wales Police admit that they had been following the boys earlier but deny any involvement in the crash. The force refers itself to the Independent Office for Police Conduct for investigation.
- 25 May
  - Nine people were arrested for participating in the Ely riot, police confirm.
  - Bablin Molik becomes the first woman of colour to be appointed as Lord Mayor of Cardiff.
  - Welsh Water customers will receive a £10 rebate following an Ofwat ruling over the publication of incorrect data relating to leaks and usage.
- 29 May–3 June – The Urdd National Eisteddfod takes place in Llandovery, Carmarthenshire.

=== June ===
- 1 June – Labour MP Geraint Davies is suspended by the part following accusations of sexual harassment.
- 7 June – Labour MP and frontbencher Gerald Jones wins his party's selection to become the Labour candidate for the new parliamentary seat of Merthyr Tydfil and Upper Cynon, which will be contested at the next UK general election. The seat was ultimately renamed Merthyr Tydfil and Aberdare in the final recommendations.
- 8 June – Plans are approved for a 35-storey tower block in Cardiff that will become Wales's tallest building. The structure in the city's Wood Street will be 113 m (371 ft) tall, overtaking The Tower building in Swansea, which is 107 m (351 ft).
- 9 June
  - The Welsh Government announces plans to launch a consultation on the introduction of rent controls for private tenants.
  - Rhun ap Iorwerth is set to become the next leader of Plaid Cymru after the final two candidates seen as potential rivals in the party's leadership race, Sian Gwenllian and Sioned Williams, issue a joint statement ruling themselves out of the contest.
- 10 June – A parking firm loses a civil case against a motorist over an unpaid £160 fine because it failed to provide the information in Welsh as she had requested.
- 13 June
  - The Independent Office for Police Conduct announces that gross misconduct notices have been served on the two officers who followed the teenager boys killed in a crash involving an electronic bike prior to the Ely riot.
  - Independent councillor Ieuan Williams stands down as deputy leader of Isle of Anglesey County Council after telling a meeting the previous evening that "all Tories should be shot". Apologising for the comment, Williams says he was "angry and emotional" about poverty at the time.
- 16 June – Rhun ap Iorwerth is elected unopposed as the new leader of Plaid Cymru.
- 17 June – Welsh recipients of honours in the King's first Birthday Honours List include Paralympian Pippa Britton (OBE), politician Jane Hutt (CBE) and Professor Medwin Hughes (CBE).
- 18 June – Heavy rain and thunderstorms causes flash flooding in Wrexham.
- 26 June – Ryan Reynolds and S4C agree a deal to broadcast Welsh language programmes in the United States on Reynolds's Fubo channel under the banner of Welsh Wednesdays.
- 27 June – The Welsh Government announce plans to tackle diabetes and obesity by restriction meal deals involving foods high in fat, sugar and salt.
- 28 June – Ffos-y-Fran in Merthyr Tydfil, the UK's largest opencast mine, has made a last-minute appeal against an order to stop digging for coal.
- 30 June – A further six arrests have been made in connection with the Ely riot, bringing the total so far to 27.

=== July ===
- 4–9 July – The Llangollen International Musical Eisteddfod takes place, including appearances by Alfie Boe and Tommy Blaize.
- 8 July
  - It is reported that members of Flintshire County Council are to be given lessons in respect after one of its members called First Minister Mark Drakeford "Führer" on Facebook.
  - Anna-Louise Marsh-Rees, leader of Covid-19 Bereaved Families Cymru, renews calls for a Wales-specific COVID-19 Inquiry, describing a decision to establish a Senedd Committee as no substitute for an inquiry, and that it "cannot possibly cover the range of issues and get to the level of granularity that we need".
- 11 July
  - In the Senedd, Mark Drakeford defends former Health Minister Vaughan Gething for not reading pandemic paperwork until he prepared for the COVID-19 inquiry, but Andrew RT Davies, leader of the Welsh Conservatives questions how there can be confidence in Gething's current job as Economy Minister.
  - Drakeford confirms to the Senedd that free school meals will not be extended through the summer holidays.
- 12 July – The wife of broadcaster Huw Edwards states that he is receiving treatment in a mental hospital following the publication of stories about him in The Sun.
- 13 July – Caryl Lewis wins the 2023 Wales Book of the Year Award for her debut English language novel Drift.
- 20 July – Convicted firebomber Sion Aubrey Roberts tells a BBC documentary he was involved in burning down English-owned houses in Wales as part of Meibion Glyndwr, which set fire to around 200 properties during the 1980s.
- 24 July – Welsh whisky is given protected status through the geographical indication scheme.
- 24–27 July – The 2023 Royal Welsh Show takes place at Builth Wells. Rising costs and a series of financial losses cause the horticultural show to be excluded for the first time.
- 26 July
  - South Wales Police launch a forensic review into the 1993 murders of Harry and Megan Tooze on the killings' 30th anniversary.
  - The Public Law Project launches a legal challenge against the Welsh Government's decision to scrap free school meal help for children during the summer holidays.
- 29 July – Former paratrooper Chris Lewis, of Swansea, completes a six-year 19,000 mile walk around the Coastline of the United Kingdom, having raised £500,000 for armed forces charity SSAFA.

=== August ===
- 2 August – Gwent Police says it is "reviewing" the content of a leaflet sent to constituents by Conservative MP David TC Davies discussing traveller sites in the area. They subsequently announce Davies will face no action over the leaflet.
- 4 August –
  - Doctors belonging to BMA Cymru reject a 5% pay offer from the Welsh Government, describing it as the "worst offer in the UK".
  - A lawsuit against Welsh language campaigner Toni Schiavone for the non-payment of a parking fine because the ticket was written in English is rejected following a hearing at Aberystwyth Crown Court.
- 7 August – The Ynni Cymru publicly owned energy company of the Welsh Government, is founded.
- 9 August –
  - First Minister Mark Drakeford confirms he will leave the Senedd at the 2026 Senedd election; he is expected to stand down as First Minister before then.
  - Drakeford asks ministers to make cuts to public services as inflation and public sector pay place constraints on the Welsh Government's budget.
- 11 August
  - Jay Humphries, the son of First Minister Mark Drakeford, is sentenced to 58 weeks imprisonment for breaching a sex offender's order following his release from prison. Humphries was sentenced to eight and a half years in 2018 following a rape conviction, and breached the order by choosing an unauthorised username on a dating website and deleting his internet browsing history.
  - Alan Llwyd wins the bardic chair at the National Eisteddfod of Wales for the third time.
- 12 August – Nine people are injured, two of them seriously, after a car ploughs into campers and a tent at a campsite in Newgale, Pembrokeshire.
- 13 August – The UK government decides to retain COVID-19 licencing rules for pubs in England and Wales that allows the sale of takeaway drinks.
- 16 August – Abi Tierney is appointed as the first female chief executive of the Welsh Rugby Union.
- 29 August – Monmouthshire county councillor Sara Burch resigns from her cabinet post following a post on Twitter in which she likened the actions of the Secretary of State for Wales to events in the Romani Holocaust after accusing him of "whipping up anti-traveller feeling".

=== September ===
- 1 September – Members of the Royal College of Nursing in Wales vote to accept a 5% pay rise, along with a one-off payment of between £900 and £1,190, ending the nursing strikes in Wales.
- 3 September – Research published by the Welsh Retail Consortium indicated that one in six shops in Wales are empty.
- 5 September – One person is killed and ten taken to hospital following a crash between a car and a 52-seater coach at the Cleddau Bridge.
- 12 September – The Welsh Government urges the UK government to ban the sale of single-use disposable vapes.
- 15 September –
  - The UK government and Tata Steel reach a deal to keep the Port Talbot Steelworks open. The agreement will see £500m investment from the UK government and £700m from Tata Steel, but could see as many as 3,000 redundancies from the plant.
  - One person is taken to hospital and four others injured after being bitten by a dog during a "disturbance" at a holiday park in Kinmel Bay, Conwy County. Two people are arrested following the incident.
- 17 September – Wales becomes the first part of the UK to reduce speed limits in built up areas from 30 mph to 20 mph.
- 19 September – A petition on the gov.wales website opposing the 20 mph speed limit has received over 177,000 signatures since its launch, and will be considered by the Senedd Petitions Committee for debate as it has passed the 10,000 signatures required to be considered for debate.
- 20 September –
  - Several hundred properties in south and west Wales are left without power after heavy rain caused by the remnants of Hurricane Lee (2023)
  - Bridgend Indoor Market in the town's Rhiw Shopping Centre is closed with immediate effect after reinforced autoclaved aerated concrete is discovered in the roof.
- 23 September – A petition against the new 20 mph speed limit in Wales reaches 400,000 signatures as protesters gather to march against the new law in adrift.
- 26 September – First Minister Mark Drakeford tells the Senedd he has received threats to his personal safety over Wales's 20 mph speed limit, while police confirm they are investigating "reports of malicious communications" sent to Drakeford.
- 27 September – Flintshire County Council rejects an application by the owners of Northop Hall Country House Hotel to change the purpose of the venue to house 400 male asylum seekers.
- 30 September – A statue of entertainer Max Boyce, by Rubin Eynon, is unveiled in his home town of Glynneath, in recognition of Boyce's 80th birthday.

=== October ===
- 3 October – Six people have been arrested after two fires were started during protests at the Stradey Park Hotel in Llanelli, Carmarthenshire, which has been earmarked by the Home Office for use as accommodation for asylum seekers.
- 4 October – Prime Minister Rishi Sunak announces £1bn in funding for the electrification of the North Wales Main Line after scrapping the Birmingham to Manchester leg of the High Speed 2 rail link.
- 10 October –
  - Labour suspends Newport City Councilor Miqdad Al-Nuaimi while it investigates posts he made on social media about Israeli security policy in Gaza.
  - Controversial plans to house asylum seekers at Stradey Park Hotel in Llanelli are scrapped by the Home Office.
  - Bilingual pop duo Rogue Jones win the 2023 Welsh Music Prize for their album Dos Bebés.
- 12 October –
  - Senedd Presiding Officer Elin Jones refuses a request from Conservative leader Andrew RT Davies to fly the Flag of Israel outside the Senedd building, saying it should not be flown while both Israelis and Palestinians are suffering.
  - Llinos Griffin-Williams steps down as S4C's chief content officer following allegations of "inappropriate incidents" involving heated exchanges with production staff at a bar in France during the Rugby World Cup match between Wales and Georgia. S4C subsequently confirms she has been dismissed, and it is alleged that during the incidents she told former Wales scrum half Mike Phillips, who is part of the presenting team, that his Welsh skills were not good enough and that she could end his career.
- 14 October – After setting a target in 2018 that 95% of train journeys in Wales would be made on new trains by 2023, data released by Transport for Wales reveals that on 29% of journeys are being made on new trains due to delays. TfW blames the COVID-19 pandemic and other factors for the delays and says it has revised its target.
- 17 October –
  - First Minister Mark Drakeford says the Welsh Government has had to make budget cuts across the board to fund the NHS in Wales and rail transport.
  - Wales becomes the first country in the UK to ban the use of snares and glue boards for catching rats.
  - GB News is removed from the internal television system of the Senedd following comments made by Laurence Fox, which a spokesman for the Presiding Officer describes as "deliberately offensive".
- 19 October –
  - Welsh Water admits illegally spilling untreated sewage at a number of sites after it was presented with a dossier on the issue by BBC News.
  - Data released by NHS Wales indicates NHS waiting lists in Wales have continued to increase, with 760,282 people waiting for treatment, one in five of those waiting for more than a year.
  - Appearing before the Senedd Culture Committee, former Culture Secretary Sir John Whittingdale suggests that Welsh rugby could be added to the list of sporting events that must be available free-to-air on television if the Senedd requested it.
- 20 October –
  - Cardiff University Students' Union bans anyone wearing blue shirts and chinos – an outfit usually associated with sports clubs – from its Wednesday club night after what it described as "reckless, dangerous and incredibly irresponsible" behaviour by a group of male students dressed in the attire on 4 October.
  - Welsh rapper Ren Gill reaches number one in the UK Album Chart with his second album Sick Boi, an account of chronic illness that has left him unable to perform on stage.
- 21 October – Natural Resources Wales (NRW) issues a "danger to life" flood warning for Llandrinio in Powys, where the Rivers Severn and Vyrnwy meet.
- 22 October –
  - Economy minister Vaughan Gething says train operator Transport for Wales Rail will not receive a "blank cheque" for future funding.
  - The Welsh Ambulance Service declares an "extraordinary incident" in the Swansea Bay health board area as several ambulances are forced to wait outside the emergency department of Swansea's Morriston Hospital for several hours, one of them for as long as 28 hours.
- 25 October –
  - Lewis Edwards, a former officer with South Wales Police who groomed 210 underage girls using social media and blackmailed them into sending him indecent photographs, is sentenced to life imprisonment with a minimum term of 12 years.
  - Welsh Conservative leader Andrew RT Davies appears on Nigel Farage's GB News programme, later facing criticism from a senior Welsh Government minister for "appalling misogyny" for suggesting that Senedd Convenor Elin Jones was too "busy doing her hair" to appear on the programme.
- 28 October – A pro-Palestinian protest takes place in central Cardiff during which a protester sprays graffiti on BBC Cymru Wales New Broadcasting House. A woman is subsequently charged over the incident.
- 30 October –
  - Mark Drakeford, First Minister of Wales and leader of Welsh Labour, echoes Labour leader Sir Keir Starmer's call for a humanitarian pause in the Gaza conflict to allow aid in to the region. His comments come after 12 of his backbenchers in the Senedd signed a petition calling for a ceasefire.
  - A ban on the sale of some single use plastic items, such as cutlery, plates and drinking straws, comes into force in Wales.

=== November ===
- 1 November – Kiln Park, a caravan park in Pembrokeshire, is evacuated ahead of Storm Ciarán amid flooding concerns.
- 7 November – Following revelations about the deleting of WhatsApp messages by the Scottish Government, First Minister of Wales, Mark Drakeford (who does not use the app himself), tells the Senedd he cannot guarantee that messages sent by ministers and officials within the Welsh Government, and sought by the UK COVID-19 Inquiry, were not deleted.
- 8 November –
  - Carol Vorderman confirms she is to leave her weekly Saturday morning show on BBC Radio Wales after breaching the BBC's impartiality rules by posting content critical of the UK government on X.
  - Members of the Senedd vote 24–19 to back a Plaid Cymru motion calling for a ceasefire in Gaza. The motion is supported by 11 members of Welsh Labour, while First Minister Mark Drakeford is among 11 Labour members to abstain.
- 10 November – Lewis Bush, 26, is sentenced to life imprisonment with a minimum of 16 years for the murder of his mother, 44-year-old Kelly Pitt, in a "ferocious and sustained assault" at her home in Newport in May 2023.
- 13 November – Wales's health minister, Eluned Morgan, apologises over a social media post commenting on David Cameron's appointment as Foreign Secretary in which she asked if "Thatcher's hearse" would be next to arrive at Downing Street.
- 14 November – An independent review into the Welsh Rugby Union finds a culture of sexist, misogynism, racism and homophobia, and says that aspects of this behaviour were not properly challenged.
- 15 November –
  - Senedd Presiding Officer Elin Jones announces an independent review of television channels that will be available in the Senedd building following her previous ban of GB News.
  - Eryri National Park Authority (Snowdonia National Park Authority) votes to refer to its lakes in Welsh only after 200 years of dual-language English and Welsh names.
- 17 November – Police launch an investigation after the constituency office of Jo Stevens, the Shadow Secretary of State for Wales, was vandalised after she abstained during the Parliamentary vote calling for a ceasefire in Gaza.
- 18 November – The Football Association of Wales reports that 32 Welsh football fans were detained by police in Armenia ahead of Wales's European Championship qualifier match against the country. Around 3,000 fans travelled to Armenia for the game.
- 19 November – Dyfed-Powys Police confirm that a 14-year-old girl has been charged with attempted murder and possession of an illegal weapon following a stabbing incident involving another teenage girl in Coelbren, Powys, three days earlier.
- 20 November – The Welsh Government publish proposals to make changes to the school year, including reducing the summer holiday by a week.
- 21 November – Police searching for four teenagers from Shrewsbury, who had disappeared two days previously while on a camping trip to Snowdonia, find four bodies in a partially submerged vehicle in a ditch, near the A4085 in Garreg, near Tremadog, Gwynedd.
- 23 November – Figures from NHS Wales indicate waiting lists have reached another record high, with 594,000 patients waiting for treatment.
- 24 November – Sian Doyle is sacked from the role of chief executive of S4C following a review into allegations of "bullying and a toxic culture" at the Welsh broadcaster.
- 28 November – At the COVID-19 enquiry, Michael Gove claims that the Welsh Government was kept fully informed of UK Government activities, but expresses a view that there are some public health scenarios where UK ministers should be able to "override" devolved government powers.
- 29 November – An inquest opens in Caernarfon, Gwynedd, into the deaths of Jevon Hirst, Wilf Fitchett, Harvey Owen and Hugo Morris, and hears the four teenagers drowned after their car overturned while they were on a camping trip in north Wales.
- 30 November – Sian Doyle, the former chief executive of S4C, writes to the Secretary of State for Culture to accuse the broadcaster's chairman, Rhodri Williams, of being the "embodiment" of a "culture of fear, secrecy and excessive control".

=== December ===
- 1 December – Christopher El Gifari is sentenced to life imprisonment with a minimum of 32 years for the murder of delivery driver Mark Lang, who was dragged for half a mile under his own van when it was stolen in Cardiff.
- 5 December – A 28-year-old man is arrested on suspicion of attempted murder after a pregnant woman was stabbed at an address in Aberfan. The man is subsequently charged over the incident.
- 6 December – A report by the BECTU trade union claims that former S4C boss Sian Doyle behaved like a dictator and created a "culture of fear" at the Welsh language broadcaster.
- 7 December – Former S4C chief executive Sian Doyle is reported to have been admitted to hospital after taking an overdose.
- 9 December – The South Wales Argus reports that NHS officials have conducted a review after relatives of a deceased patient at The Grange University Hospital, in Cwmbran, Torfaen, were given the wrong body to cremate, and were then forced to attend a second cremation once the mistake was identified. Officials say it was an isolated incident.
- 11 December – Three teenagers are killed in a crash between a car and a bus at Coedely, Rhondda Cynon Taf.
- 12 December – First Minister Mark Drakeford launches an investigation into whether Sports Minister Dawn Bowden breached the ministerial code over her handling of the Welsh Rugby Union sexism scandal.
- 13 December –
  - Mark Drakeford announces his resignation as leader of the Welsh Labour Party. He says he will leave his post as First Minister when a successor has been selected.
  - Emergency services attend a large fire on an industrial estate at Treforest, Pontypridd, following reports of a large explosion. One person remains unaccounted for after the fire, in a warehouse complex called Rizla House, is put out.
- 14 December –
  - Wales's Economy Minister, Vaughan Gething, announces his intention to stand in the 2024 Welsh Labour leadership election.
  - A body is found following the Rizla Hose fire. The victim is later identified as 40-year-old Danielle Evans, a scientist who ran a food testing lab within the complex.
- 15 December – Eluned Morgan, considered a favourite in the Welsh Labour leadership election, rules herself out of the contest.
- 17 December – Mark Drakeford expresses his disappointment there are no women candidates in the Welsh Labour leadership contest, and claims personal attacks on social media have discouraged them from entering the contest.
- 18 December
  - Education Minister Jeremy Miles formally announces his Welsh Labour leadership campaign after winning the backing of 16 Labour members of the Senedd.
  - After 98% of the 65% of junior doctors in Wales who responded to a ballot voted to take industrial action, a three-day strike is announced for January 2024, beginning on 15 January.
- 19 December – The budget for Wales, announced by Finance Minister Rebecca Evans, cuts spending on public services, with funds being diverted to support the NHS.
- 21 December
  - Hospital waiting lists in Wales have risen for the eighth consecutive month, with just under 764,400 people waiting for treatment in October 2023. Figures for ambulance and accident and emergency waiting times, and cancer treatment have improved.
  - A multi-vehicle crash results in the closure of the eastbound carriageway of the Second Severn Crossing, while the original Severn Bridge is closed because of Storm Pia.
- 22 December
  - Anglesey pulls out of hosting the 2027 Island Games because of the cost of staging the event, which will now take place in the Faroe Islands.
  - Figures show that more than 2,000 fines were issued by education authorities in Wales for school absences during the 2022–23 academic year.
- 25 December – Amateur sailor Dafydd Hughes of Wales pulls out of the Global Solo Challenge round-the-world yacht race after his auto-pilot system breaks down.
- 27 December – A multi-vehicle crash on the Second Severn Crossing, partly attributed to Storm Gerrit, results in the closure of both carriageways while emergency repairs to the central barrier are carried out.
- 28 December
  - A lightning strike leaves 36,000 properties without power in Ceredigion; power is later restored.
  - Refuse collectors in Cardiff begin a four-week strike, which is due to end on 25 January 2024.
- 29 December
  - Welsh people named in the 2024 New Year Honours include singer Shirley Bassey (CH), businesswoman Amanda Blanc (DBE), film producer Felicity Dahl (DBE), and politician Huw Edwards (MBE).
  - A yellow weather warning for high winds and heavy rain is issued by the Met Office for the following day.
- 30 December – Figures released by NHS Wales indicate a third of staff absences are due to stress, depression or anxiety, with figures peaking after the COVID-19 pandemic at around 14,500.
- 31 December – A fresh yellow weather warning is issued for high winds on New Year's Eve for parts of south, mid and west Wales.

== Arts and culture ==
=== National Eisteddfod of Wales ===
- Chair: Alan Llwyd
- Crown: Rhys Iorwerth, "Rhyddid"
- Prose Medal: Meleri Wyn James, "Hallt"
- Drama Medal: Cai Llywelyn Evans, Eiliad o Ddewiniaeth
- Gwobr Goffa Daniel Owen: Alun Ffred Jones

=== Urdd National Eisteddfod ===
- Chair: Tegwen Bruce-Deans
- Crown: Owain Williams

=== Music ===
==== Albums ====
- John Cale – Mercy
- Euros Childs – Thrips
- Far from Saints – Far from Saints
- Godsticks – This Is What a Winner Looks Like
- Gruff Rhys – The Almond & the Seahorse
- Skindred – Smile

==== Opera ====
- Blaze of Glory!, an opera by David Hackbridge Johnson, with libretto by Emma Jenkins, is premiered by Welsh National Opera, starring Jeffrey Lloyd-Roberts, Themba Mvula and Rebecca Evans.

=== Film ===
- Y Sŵn

=== Broadcasting ===
- 8 February – S4C wins the "Best Multi-Channel Programme" Award at the Broadcast Awards 2023 for Fi, Rhyw ac Anabledd.

==== English language radio ====
- 13 February – Early breakfast show on Radio 2 Wales, presented by Owain Wyn Evans
- 2 April – Bronwen Lewis on BBC Radio Wales
- 6 July – What Just Happened, with Kiri Pritchard-McLean and Robin Morgan

==== English language television ====
- 23 February – Dark Land: Hunting the Killers, series 2
- 15 May – Steeltown Murders, starring Aneurin Barnard and Steffan Rhodri, set in Port Talbot.
- 31 July – Wolf, starring Iwan Rheon, Annes Elwy and Owen Teale
- 29 December – Men Up, starring Aneurin Barnard, Joanna Page, Iwan Rheon, Alexandra Roach and Steffan Rhodri

==== Welsh language radio ====
- 25 July – Presenter Mari Grug shares information about her recent breast cancer diagnosis with listeners to Dros Frecwast.

==== Welsh language television ====
- Dal y Mellt/Rough Cut
- Drych: Y Dyn yn y Van
- Pren ar y Bryn, starring Rhodri Meilir

== Sport ==
=== January ===
- 9 January – Welsh football legend and widely regarded as one of the best players ever, Gareth Bale announces his retirement from football.
- 11 January – The English Football League lifts the transfer embargo against Cardiff City after they paid the first installment in the controversial transfer deal with Nantes regarding Emiliano Sala.
- 18 January – The Football Association of Wales agrees a landmark deal that will see equal pay introduced with immediate effect across both men and women national football team's respectively.

=== February ===
- 7 February – Swansea City footballer Joe Allen announces his retirement from international duties with the Wales national football team.
- 21 February – Wales delays the announcement of its line up for the Six Nations match against England on 25 February as the threat of strike action by the Wales team continues.
- 22 February – Following an agreement between rugby union players and the Welsh Rugby Union (WRU), it is confirmed the England v Wales match scheduled for 25 February will go ahead.

=== March ===
- 7 March – AFC Wimbledon footballer Chris Gunter announces his retirement from international duties with the Wales national football team. He became the first Welsh footballer to reach 100 caps at an international level.
- 12 March – Swindon Town footballer Jonny Williams announces his retirement from international duties with the Wales national football team.
- 17 March – Adran Premier club Wrexham AFC Women set a Welsh women's domestic football attendance record of 9,511, breaking Cardiff City's record of 5,175 against Abergavenny Town.
- 18 March – The New Saints wins the Cymru Premier in a goalless draw against Connah's Quay Nomads, taking their 15th Cymru Premier title.
- 26 March – Welsh rugby clubs vote for major governance changes to the Welsh Rugby Union board following a general meeting at their headquarters in Port Talbot.

=== April ===
- 22 April – Wrexham A.F.C. win promotion back to the English Football League after fifteen years as a non-league team following a game against Boreham Wood, which Wrexham won 3–1.

=== June ===
- 18 June – Gerwyn Price and Jonny Clayton, representing Wales, win the World Cup of Darts.

=== July ===
- 19 July – A statue of Welsh rugby league players Billy Boston, Gus Risman and Clive Sullivan is unveiled in Cardiff.
- 24 July – Cheryl Foster becomes the first Welsh referee to take charge of a World Cup match since 1978 when she referees at Brazil's match against Panama in Adelaide.

=== August ===
- 19–27 August – Welsh athletes Jeremiah Azu, Joe Brier, Natasha Cockram and Melissa Courtney-Bryant represent Great Britain and Northern Ireland at the 2023 World Athletics Championships in Budapest.

=== December ===
- 18 December – Cyclist Emma Finucane is named 2023 BBC Cymru Wales Sports Personality of the Year.
- 27 December – The 2023 Welsh Grand National takes place at Chepstow Racecourse. The race is won by Nassalam, trained by Gary Moore and ridden by Caoilin Quinn.

== Deaths ==
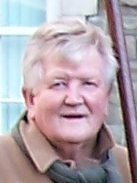
Tyrone O'Sullivan

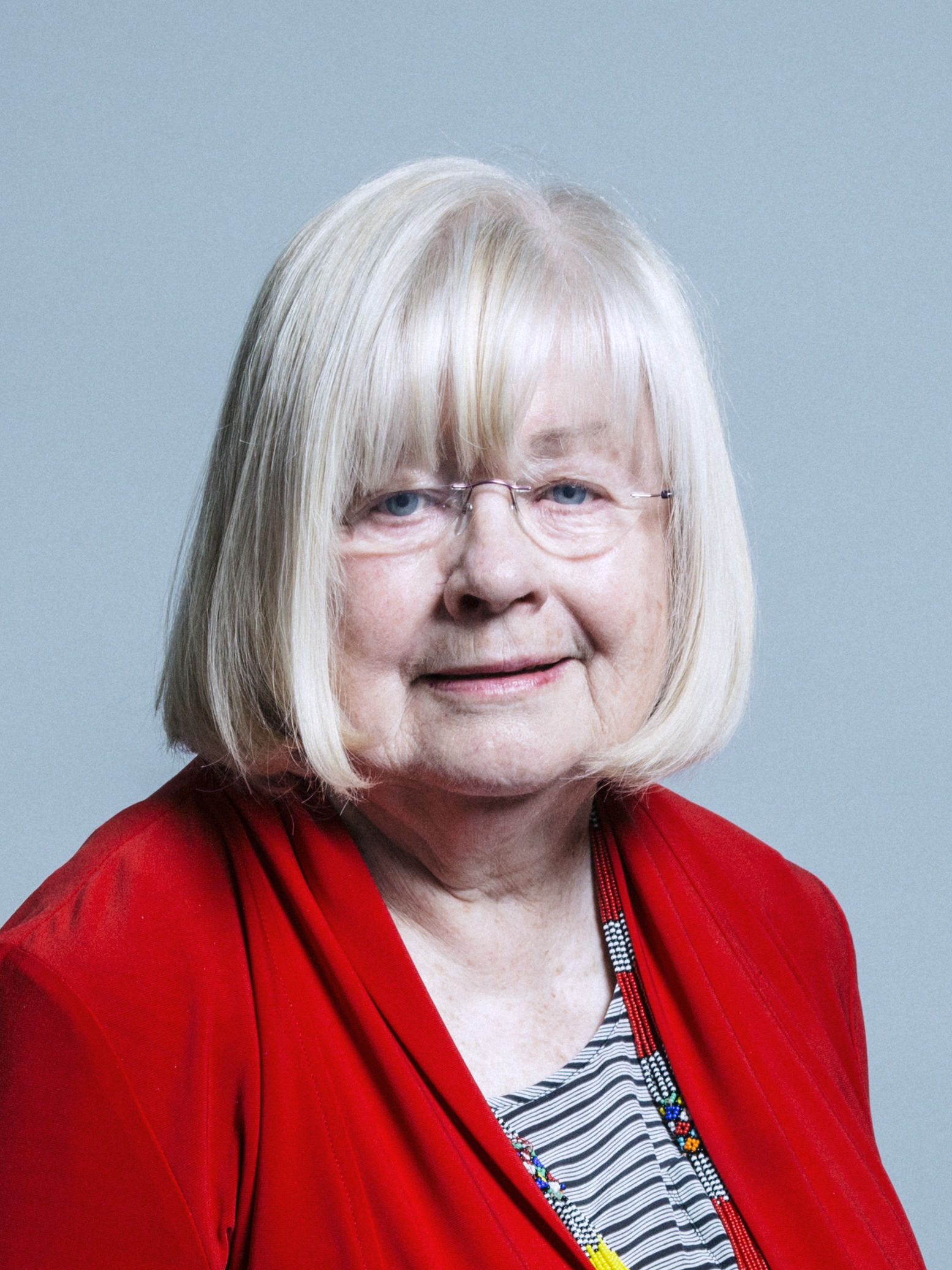
Ann Clwyd

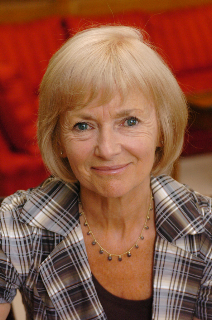
Glenys Kinnock

- 4 January – Aled Glynne, broadcaster, 61.
- 28 January – Clare Drakeford, wife of Mark Drakeford, 71
- 9 February – Charlie Faulkner, rugby international and coach, 81
- 14 February – Christine Pritchard, actress (Pobol y Cwm, Cara Fi), 79
- 9 March – Alan Jones, footballer, 77
- 14 March – Laurie Daniel, rugby union player, 81.
- 23 March – Dafydd Hywel, actor, 77
- 30 March (death announced on this date) – David Willicombe, rugby league player, 72.
- 6 April – Nicola Heywood-Thomas, broadcaster and newsreader, 67.
- 4 May – Chris Reynolds, cartoonist, 62
- 11 May – Shaun Pickering, Olympic shot putter and athletics coach, 61
- 11 May – Tyrone O'Sullivan, miner, trade union leader and industrialist, 77
- 14 June – Norman Rees, television journalist, 84
- 2 July – Wayne Evans, footballer, 51
- 21 July – Ann Clwyd, politician, 86
- 24 July – Adrian Street, wrestler, 82.
- 29 July – Clive Rowlands, rugby union footballer and later coach, 85.
- 14 August – Brynley F. Roberts, librarian, scholar and critic, 92
- 3 September – David Watkins, rugby union and rugby league player and coach, 81
- 6 September – Gareth Miles, Welsh-language author, translator and campaigner, 85
- 24 September – Keith Baxter, actor, 90
- 26 September – Glanmor Griffiths, Chairman of the Welsh Rugby Union, 83
- 14 October – Gwyn Richards, cricketer, 71
- 31 October – Ronnie Rees, footballer, 79
- 5 November – Ryland Davies, operatic tenor, 80
- 15 November – David Rowe-Beddoe, businessman and first chair of the Wales Millennium Centre, 85
- 20 November – Annabel Giles, model, TV and radio presenter, 64
- 25 November – Martin Lockley, palaeontologist, 73
- 25 November – Brian Godding, 78, Welsh jazz rock guitarist (Blossom Toes, Centipede).
- 28 November – Allan Rogers, Labour Party politician, MP (1983–2001) and MEP (1979–1984), 91
- 3 December – Glenys Kinnock, 79, British politician, MEP (1994–2009), member of the House of Lords (2009–2021), and minister of state for Europe (2009).
- 18 December – Brian Price, 86, Welsh rugby union player (Newport, British Lions, national team).
