= 2024 in Wales =

- Centuries: 19th; 20th; 21st
- Decades: 2000s; 2010s; 2020s
- See also: List of years in Wales; Timeline of Welsh history 2024 in The United Kingdom England Scotland Elsewhere Welsh football: 2023–24

Events from the year 2024 in Wales.

== Incumbents ==
- First Minister –
  - Mark Drakeford (until 20 March)
  - Vaughan Gething (from 20 March until 6 August)
  - Eluned Morgan (from 6 August)
- Secretary of State for Wales –
  - David T. C. Davies (until 5 July),
  - Jo Stevens (after 5 July)
- Archbishop of Wales – Andy John, Bishop of Bangor
- Archdruid of the National Eisteddfod of Wales –
  - Myrddin ap Dafydd (outgoing)
  - Mererid Hopwood (incoming)
- National Poet of Wales – Hanan Issa

== Events ==
=== January ===
- 1 January – Social services in Wales have estimated they face a £646m shortfall over the next three years as a result of Welsh Government budget cuts.
- 2 January – Provisional data released by the Met Office indicates 2023 was the second warmest year on record in the UK behind 2022, with Wales and Northern Ireland experiencing their warmest year on record during 2023.
- 3 January – Huw Jakeway, chief fire officer of South Wales Fire and Rescue Service, announces his departure from the role following the publication of a report concluded that the service had tolerated sexual harassment and domestic abuse outside work.
- 4 January – Storm Henk causes widespread flooding in many parts of Wales. Twenty-five Welsh rivers are the subject of warnings.
- 8 January – Police begin enforcing Wales's default 20 mph speed limit. Outgoing First Minister Mark Drakeford says that drivers who are "genuinely confused" about the new speed limit rules will not be prosecuted.
- 9 January – Fijian rugby union player Api Ratuniyarawa is sentenced at Cardiff Crown Court to two years and ten months in prison after admitting three sexual assaults in a Cardiff nightclub in late 2023.
- 11 January
  - Dyfed-Powys Police have launched a hate crime investigation after a note was attached to a property in Aberystwyth describing its occupants as "low-life" who should go back to "Brummyland".
  - Presteigne and Norton in Powys are announced as Wales's first dark sky community.
- 16 January – Rhodri Williams announces he has written to the UK government to ask them not to consider him for a second term as chairman of S4C following controversy at the TV channel.
- 18 January – A report prepared by the Independent Commission on the Constitutional Future of Wales, a body co-chaired by Dr Rowan Williams and Professor Laura McAllister, concludes that Welsh independence is a "viable" option, but that an independent Wales would face significant challenges such as raising enough tax revenue in the short term. The report also recommends that Westminster should grant Wales full control of its rail network, policing and justice as soon as is possible.
- 19 January
  - Tata Steel announce plans to close both blast furnaces at its Port Talbot plant with the loss of around 2,800 jobs.
  - Fire breaks out at a warehouse owned by Owens Group on the Bridgend Industrial Estate, leading to the building's collapse within minutes.
- 23 January – Data from Public Health Wales shows a sharp increase in the number of whooping cough cases in Wales, with 135 so far in January, compared to 200 for the whole of 2023.
- 25 January – Wedding DJ Leigh Brookfield of Llanelli, who filmed himself urinating on a 72-year-old cancer patient then posted the footage on social media, is sentenced to 14 weeks imprisonment.
- 26 January – Education Minister Jeremy Miles criticises the way Wales' largest trade union, Unite, declared its preferred candidate for the Welsh Labour leadership election. The union held a hustings with the two candidates before announcing its support for Vaughan Gething.
- 27 January – Dorrien Davies is consecrated Bishop of St David's.
- 30 January
  - Members of the Senedd vote 39–14 to back the Senedd Reform Bill which will expand the legislature to 96 members at the 2026 Senedd election and change the way members are elected.
  - Mark Drakeford says the Welsh Government is willing to talk to the Welsh Rugby Union about the terms of repaying an £18m loan given to it during the pandemic after the WRU asked for "breathing space".
- 31 January – Data released by Dyfed-Powys Police reveals the force spent over a £1m dealing with protests related to plans for asylum seekers to be housed at Stradey Park Hotel in Llanelli, Carmarthenshire, a scheme that was eventually scrapped by the Home Office.

=== February ===
- 1 February
  - It becomes a criminal offence to own an American XL Bully dog in England and Wales unless the owner has successfully applied for the dog to be exempt.
  - Pwllheli Lifeboat Station in Gwynedd is forced to close due to a "serious breakdown" in relationships between crew members.
  - Penny Mordaunt, the Leader of the House of Commons, claims that plans to expand the Senedd from 60 to 96 MSs represent the equivalent of expanding the House of Commons from 650 to 2,000 MPs.
- 3 February – Seventeen grassroots music venues across Wales experiencing financial difficulties are offered £718,000 in Welsh Government funding to help keep them open.
- 4 February – Dafydd Wigley, a former leader of Plaid Cymru, warns that reforms to Wales's political system pose "a very great danger" since it will destroy the relationship between voters and the people they elect.
- 6 February
  - Welsh Government minister Hannah Blythyn announces that the Welsh Government will take over South Wales Fire and Rescue Service after it was found to have a culture of harassment and misogynism.
  - Education Minister Jeremy Miles confirms that University tuition fees will rise from £9,000 to £9,250 a year from September 2024.
- 7 February – Pembrokeshire County Council proposes a council tax rise of between 16% and 21%, potentially making it the highest annual council tax rise in Wales.
- 8 February – The Welsh Government announces it is axing its School Beat Cymru scheme in which police officers visit schools to deliver lessons on substance abuse, safety, safeguarding and behaviour.
- 9 February – At Swansea Crown Court, David Clarke, 80, is sentenced to life imprisonment with a minimum of 21 years and eight months after previously admitting to the murder of his wife, Helen, who he struck with a hammer before setting their car alight while she was unconscious inside the vehicle, and following an argument about an affair.
- 10 February – A pilot is taken to hospital after his light aircraft crashes into the back garden of a house in Bodffordd, Anglesey.
- 12 February – Pembrokeshire County Council's cabinet approves proposals to increase its council tax by 16%.
- 13 February – A coroner's verdict on the death of Newport man Phillip Morris at a private hospital in Surrey in December 2021 leads to calls for "more of an openness" about the safety record of private healthcare.
- 14 February – Former Labour Party leader Neil Kinnock endorses Vaughan Gething to lead Welsh Labour as the next First Minister of Wales.
- 15 February
  - A Met Office yellow weather warning for heavy rain is in force for much of south and west Wales.
  - Bishopston Comprehensive School in Swansea is closed indefinitely amid concerns over ground movement, and its pupils will not be able to return after half-term.
- 16 February – The ballot to elect the next leader of Welsh Labour opens.
- 17 February
  - The Fire Brigades Union passes a motion of no confidence in Stuart Millington, the recently appointed interim Chief Fire Officer of South Wales Fire and Rescue Service after allegations of bullying.
  - Noel Mooney, the chief executive of the Football Association of Wales, signals his support for matches being played during the summer after 6,000 games were lost over the 2023–24 season because of weather conditions and inadequate facilities.
- 21 February – Junior doctors in Wales begin a 72-hour strike.
- 22 February – Figures from NHS Wales show hospital waiting lists in Wales have fallen for the second month in a row, with 756,333 "patient pathways" on the waiting list in December 2023.
- 24 February – Charlotte Church attends a fundraising event for Middle East Children's Alliance at Bedwas Workmen's Hall, Caerphilly county, where she leads a chorus of "From the river to the sea", a pro-Palestinian chant regarded as antisemitic by some. Following criticism from Jewish groups, including the Campaign Against Antisemitism, Church responds with a social media post in which she says she is "in no way antisemitic" but is "fighting for the liberation of all people".
- 25 February
  - Rural Affairs Minister Lesley Griffiths says the Welsh Government will rethink its post-Brexit farming strategy following protests by farmers; current plans would see them required to use 10% of their land for growing trees.
  - Speaking ahead of the UK COVID-19 Inquiry's three week session in Wales, Laura McClelland, a senior intensive care doctor, describes the practice of discharging untested patients to care homes during the pandemic as "a form of genocide".
- 27 February – The UK COVID-19 Inquiry begins sitting in Wales, and hears that Health Minister Vaughan Gething deleted WhatsApp messages during the pandemic.
- 28 February
  - Thousands of farmers stage a protest in Cardiff city centre over the Welsh Government's environmental subsidy plans.
  - John Harding is sentenced to fifteen years in prison after being found guilty of ten charges of rape, strangulation and false imprisonment against two women following a trial at Merthyr Crown Court.

=== March ===
- 1 March – The annual Cân i Gymru (Song for Wales) contest is held in Swansea, and is won by Sara Davies with the song "Ti".
- 3 March – Train fares in Wales increase by 4.9%.
- 4 March
  - Consultants and specialist doctors vote to take strike action over pay.
  - Lee Waters announces he is stepping down as Transport Minister when the new First Minister is elected.
- 5 March – A bid by the Welsh Conservatives and Welsh Liberal Democrats to change planned reforms to the way Senedd members are elected from the 2026 election is rejected by the parliament.
- 6 March – Senedd member Rhys ab Owen is to be banned from the Senedd for six weeks after an investigation by the Senedd Commission found he inappropriately touched two women during a night out in June 2021.
- 7 March – Pembrokeshire Council votes to increase its council tax by 12.5%.
- 9 March – Aneurin Bevan Health Board apologises after a mix up lead to the wrong body being released from a hospital mortuary for burial, the second such mix up made by a hospital in the health board.
- 10 March – Nerys Evans, a former Senedd member for Plaid Cymru, calls for the parliament to have the powers to remove members for inappropriate behaviour.
- 11 March
  - The occupants of around forty houses in Hirwaun managed by Trivallis Housing Association are advised to evacuate the properties following the discovery of reinforced autoclaved aerated concrete.
  - After the Welsh Government publishes plans to require parties in the Senedd to draw up lists of candidates composing of 50% of women, presiding officer Elin Jones says that the Senedd does not have the power to enforce gender quotas.
- 13 March – The Senedd agrees to exclude member Rhys ab Owen for six weeks following a night out where he inappropriately touched two women; ab Owen apologises "unreservedly" for his behaviour.
- 14 March – Former Conservative MP Guto Bebb is appointed interim chair of S4C.
- 15 March – Speaking to the BBC ahead of the results of the Welsh Labour leadership election, First Minister Mark Drakeford cites drunks waiting at A&E as the reason A&E waiting time targets have never been met in Wales, and suggests it would be better if the targets did not include treating those who have been drinking.
- 16 March – Vaughan Gething is elected to lead Welsh Labour, and will become First Minister of Wales. He will be Wales's first black leader, and the first black person to lead a country in Europe.
- 18 March – Licence points and fines can now be issued for anyone breaching the speed limit in a 20 mph zone.
- 19 March – Mark Drakeford attends his final First Minister's Questions as First Minister of Wales.
- 20 March
  - The Senedd approves Vaughan Gething as First Minister of Wales, and he is duly sworn in.
  - The Prisons and Probation Ombudsman launches an investigation following the deaths of six prisoners at HMP Parc near Bridgend in a period of three weeks between 27 February and 19 March.
- 21 March – Vaughan Gething announces his cabinet. Appointments include Jeremy Miles, who becomes Economy and Energy secretary and Lynne Neagle, who becomes Education secretary.
- 22 March – At Swansea Crown Court, James Smith is sentenced to life imprisonment with a minimum of 28 years for the September 2022 murder of Ashley Sersero in Llanneli.
- 24 March – OVO Energy has been accused of "degrading" the Welsh language by campaign group Cymdeithas yr Iaith after axing its Welsh service and suggesting customers could use online translation tools to read their energy bills instead.
- 25 March – Junior doctors in Wales begin a four-day strike, their longest to date.
- 27 March – Luke Avaient and Gavin Sheppard of Cardiff are married by Lorraine Kelly live on her daytime ITV programme to mark the tenth anniversary of the first same-sex marriage to occur in the UK.
- 28 March – School absence figures for the year ending July 2023 indicate 28.9% of primary school children were persistently absent, meaning they missed at least 10% of lessons, compared to 12.9% for the 2018–19 academic year.
- 31 March
  - The Welcome Ticket scheme, introduced by the Welsh Government in March 2022 to provide refugees with free bus travel, ends after two years.
  - East Camp in St Athan, Vale of Glamorgan, is to be used to house people who worked with the British military in Afghanistan before the Taliban retook power in 2021.

=== April ===
- 3 April – Sinead Cook, an investigator at the Public Services Ombudsman for Wales, is suspended for posting anti-Conservative abuse on social media.
- 4 April – Cardiff is announced as the host of the 2027 EuroGames, Europe's largest LGBTQ+ sporting event, becoming the first UK city to stage the event.
- 5 April – Swansea University announces it is cutting 200 posts due to "financial challenges" in higher education.
- 6 April – Pembrokeshire Council gives the go-ahead to a £5.7m new bridge in Haverfordwest.
- 7 April – Sophie Ingle announces she is stepping down as Wales captain after nine years in the role.
- 9 April – A two-day strike by senior consultants and doctors planned to begin on 16 April is suspended following "constructive talks" and a "significant" pay offer from the Welsh Government.
- 11 April – Steelworkers belonging to the Unite union vote to take industrial action over Tata Steel's UK restructuring plans.
- 14 April – Museum Wales announces the loss of 90 jobs, and says it may be forced to close its building in Cardiff, after its funding was cut by the Welsh Government.
- 15 April – Tata Steel threatens to withdraw a "significantly enhanced" redundancy package if workers go on strike.
- 16 April – The Welsh National Opera announces it is cutting back on performances because of cuts in funding from the Arts Council of Wales and the Arts Council of England.
- 17 April
  - Transport Minister Ken Skates says there will be changes to Wales's default 20 mph speed limit in built up areas, with schools, hospitals and nurseries targeted as areas where it should be applied.
  - The Equality and Human Rights Commission warns that plans to enforce gender equality in the Senedd may be unlawful because it may breach the Equality Act if candidates can self-identify as female when that is not their legal sex.
- 20 April – Transport Minister Ken Skates announces that some roads will revert to a 30 mph speed limit following public backlash over the default 20 mph restrictions.
- 21 April – Cardiff teenager Lloyd Martin, who had Down's syndrome, makes history as the youngest person in his learning disability category to complete a marathon after he finishes the 2024 London Marathon.
- 23 April – Transport Minister Ken Skates announces that the process of reverting the speed limit on some roads from 20 mph back to 30 mph will begin in September.
- 24 April – Three people are injured and one other is arrested in a stabbing at Ysgol Dyffryn Aman in Ammanford.
- 25 April – A 13-year-old girl is charged with three counts of attempted murder following the previous day's school stabbing at Ammanford.

=== May ===
- 2 May – Welsh language broadcaster S4C announces that it will broadcast a Welsh language version of ITV programme The Voice. The show, titled Y Llais, will be hosted by BBC Radio 1 DJ Sian Eleri and will be broadcast in 2025.
- 8 May – MSs vote 43–16 to approve the Senedd Reform Bill that will see the number of members increase from 60 to 96 at the next election.
- 9 May
  - Members of Community, the UK's largest steelworkers' trade union, vote to take industrial action over Tata Steel's plans for restructuring, which could cost up to 2,800 jobs.
  - Data shows that 1,150 drivers were caught out by the 20 mph speed limit during April, and 2,100 since January.
- 11 May – The Met Office records Wales's warmest temperature of the year so far, with a reading of 25.1 °C at Gogerddan.
- 13 May – Following a hearing at Aberystwyth Justice Centre, Toni Schiavone, who refused to pay a parking fine because it was issued in English, loses his appeal against the fine.
- 15 May – Following a trial at Mold Crown Court, headteacher Neil Foden is convicted of the sexual abuse of four girls over a four-year period.
- 17 May
  - Plaid Cymru ends its co-operation deal with Labour following concerns about a donation of £200,000 to First Minister Vaughan Gething's leadership campaign by a company owned by a businessman twice convicted of environmental offences.
  - South Wales Police and the Senedd Commission for Standards launch investigations into claims Conservative MS Laura Anne Jones made false expenses claims.
- 21 May
  - A COVID-19 vaccination centre in Ceredigion is temporarily closed following the discovery of two snakes in the building.
  - The Senedd approves new regulations that will make it mandatory for all slaughterhouses in Wales to have CCTV.
- 24 May – Details of almost 70,000 Welsh Rugby Union club members have been exposed by a data security breach, the Cybernews website reports.
- 28 May – At Merthyr Crown Court, Daniel Popescu is sentenced to 17 years and four months for the attempted murder of his ex-girlfrield, who he stabbed as she walked home in December 2023.
- 30 May – The Unite trade union announces plans to begin industrial action on 18 June over potential job losses at Tata Steel's Port Talbot plant.
- 31 May – Three inmates from HM Prison Parc are taken to hospital following a disturbance at the prison.

=== June ===
- 3 June – The Welsh Government shelves plans to legislate for shorter school summer holidays until after the next Senedd election.
- 5 June – First Minister Vaughan Gething loses a nonbinding vote of no confidence in the Senedd with members voting 29–27 in favour of a motion put forward by the Welsh Conservatives. It follows an investigation into the activities of a leading donor to his election campaign. Gething says he will not resign following the vote.
- 7 June
  - Plaid Cymru withdraws its support for Sharifah Rahman, who was scheduled to represent the party as a candidate in Cardiff South and Penarth, following social media posts about the "situation in the Middle East" that "do not reflect the views and values of Plaid Cymru".
  - Doctors' leaders recommend that doctors in Wales accept the latest pay offer, which the Welsh Government says is in line with that offered to doctors in Scotland. Junior doctors have been offered an additional 7.4%, taking the total to 12.4% for 2023–24. There is also the potential for an additional 10.1% for some senior consultants if the offer is accepted.
  - The Senedd Reform Bill Committee has warned that plans for gender quotas at the next Senedd election could face legal challenges, and urges the Welsh Government to take urgent action to protect the election.
- 8 June – Stewart Sutherland, the Reform UK candidate for Blaenau Gwent and Rhymney, withdraws his candidacy after allegations he reposted racist content.
- 11 June – Vaughan Gething tells the Senedd he regrets the "impact" of his decision to accept a £200,000 donation from a man whose company was convicted of illegally dumping waste.
- 13 June – Plaid Cymru launches its 2024 election manifesto, which includes plans for Welsh independence, 500 extra GPs and funding from rail improvements.
- 14 June
  - In the 2024 Birthday Honours, former Llandudno subpostmaster Alan Bates receives a knighthood. Other Welsh recipients include former MP Wayne David (knighthood), broadcaster Roy Noble (CBE) and dancer Amy Dowden (MBE).
  - BBC Wales sees a series of text messages from the mobile phone of Welsh Conservative Senedd member Laura Anne Jones in which she appears to ask an employee to maximise her expenses claims. Jones is subsequently asked to step back from Wales's Shadow Cabinet as a result of the revelation.
  - At a Cardiff Crown Court hearing, teacher Ieuan Bartlett is given a life ban from teaching after he admitted repeatedly having sex with a vulnerable 15-year-old pupil; Bartlett was previously sent to prison for the offences.
- 15 June – South Wales Police warn residents near a chemical plant in Barry, Vale of Glamorgan, to close doors and windows after a white mist was seen to be leaking from the facility.
- 16 June – ITV Wales holds an election debate between senior figures from the three main political parties in Wales; David TC Davies (Conservative), Jo Stevens (Labour) and Liz Saville Roberts (Plaid Cymru).
- 20 June – The Welsh Government confirms that a section of the River Wye near Hay-on-Wye that is popular with bathers will be granted official bathing water status.
- 21 June
  - BBC Wales airs a televised election debate featuring Vaughan Gething (Labour), Jane Dodds (Liberal Democrat), Rhun ap Iorwerth (Plaid Cymru) and David TC Davies (Conservative).
  - The Unite union announces that 1,500 steelworkers at Tata Steel will begin an indefinite strike in July over plans to restructure the company that will result in the loss of 2,800 jobs.
- 26 June – Welsh Labour suspends Rhianon Passmore, the Senedd member for Islwyn, pending investigation following an allegation she was seen driving a car with two different number plates.
- 27 June – Labour lifts its suspension of Rhianon Passmore after police find that no offence was committed regarding the licence plates on her car.
- 28 June – Junior doctors, consultants and specialist doctors in Wales accept a revised pay offer from the Welsh Government, worth an extra 7.4%, giving them a total increase of 12.4% for the 2023–24 financial year.

=== July ===
- 1 July
  - Former headteacher Neil Foden is sentenced to 17 years in prison after being convicted of sexual abuse involving four girls over a period of four years.
  - Unite calls off strike action scheduled to begin at the Port Talbot steelworks on 8 July so that further discussions can take place over the future of the plant.
- 2 July – The Welsh Government says it plans to bring in a ban on Welsh politicians telling lies before the 2026 Senedd election.
- 3 July – Mick Antoniw, the Counsel General for Wales, apologises after being formally reprimanded by the Senedd for tweeting "Tories so happy to see people and particularly children killed and injured on our roads".
- 4 July
  - 2024 United Kingdom general election in Wales
  - Blast furnace no 5 at Port Talbot Steelworks, opened in 1959, is closed down for the last time.
  - Sarn Helen, Tom Bullough's book discussing climate change, is named Wales Book of the Year.
- 5 July
  - 2024 United Kingdom general election in Wales:
    - Of the 32 Westminster seats contested in Wales, Labour wins 27, Plaid Cymru wins four and the Liberal Democrats win one.
    - The Conservative Party fails to win a single Parliamentary seat in Wales for the first time since 2001.
    - David T. C. Davies, the Conservative Secretary of State for Wales, loses his Monmouthshire seat to Labour, becoming the first Welsh Secretary to lose their seat while in the post.
  - Starmer ministry: Following Labour's election victory, Jo Stevens is appointed Secretary of State for Wales in the first cabinet of Keir Starmer following the 2024 election.
- 8 July – Starmer travels to Wales to hold talks with Vaughan Gething at the Senedd.
- 9 July – In a statement to the Senedd, former minister Hannah Blythyn, who was sacked in May for being the alleged source of a leak about the first minister, refutes the allegations. Gething subsequently says the leak clearly came from her phone.
- 11 July
  - Mick Antoniw, the Counsel General for Wales urges the newly elected Labour government at Westminster to deliver on its promise of an inquiry into the June 1984 outbreak of violence at Orgreave Colliery as soon as possible, claiming the violence was orchestrated by 10 Downing Street.
  - Tata Steel begins asking its employees if they are willing to accept a voluntary redundancy package.
  - At Swansea Crown Court, Welsh snooker player Michael White is sentenced to three years in prison for assaulting his partner. He is subsequently removed from the World Snooker Tour by the International Billiards and Snooker Federation following his conviction.
- 13 July – A decision by Newport County AFC to scrap a football academy for aspiring female footballers is reported to have triggered "disappointment, anger and frustration" from players and their families.
- 15 July
  - Health Secretary Eluned Morgan launches a consultation to restrict "promotions of food products high in fat, sugar and salt", which could lead to the banning of free drink refills at cafes and restaurants.
  - The Welsh Government sets out its strategy for achieving net zero carbon by 2050, which includes installing heat pumps in the majority of homes in Wales.
- 16 July – Vaughan Gething resigns as First Minister of Wales after cabinet members Mick Antoniw, Lesley Griffiths, Julie James and Jeremy Miles resign from the Welsh Government and call on him to quit.
- 17 July – Leaked text messages exchanged between Welsh Government ministers during the COVID-19 pandemic are handed to the UK COVID-19 Inquiry.
- 20 July – July 2024 Welsh Labour leadership election: Welsh Labour officials agree a timeline for the election, with a new leader to be in place on 14 September.
- 22 July –
  - July 2024 Welsh Labour leadership election: Eluned Morgan becomes the first candidate to enter the leadership race.
  - Plaid Cymru expels Senedd member Rhys ab Owen after he was found to have inappropriately touched and sworn at two women while drunk at a party.
- 24 July –
  - July 2024 Welsh Labour leadership election: Eluned Morgan is elected unopposed as the new leader of Welsh Labour after nominations close at midday. She is the first woman to hold the position.
  - The Senedd will be recalled on 6 August to choose a new First Minister of Wales following the resignation of Vaughan Gething and the subsequent Welsh Labour leadership election.
- 29 July – Figures reveal that S4C spent more than £500,000 on its investigation into allegations of bullying and toxic culture at the broadcaster.
- 31 July – Former BBC newsreader Huw Edwards, pleads guilty to possessing indecent images of children.

=== August ===
- 1 August
  - Figures show a 23% fall in the number of road casualties in 20 mph and 30 mph zones since the introduction of the default 20 mph speed limit.
  - Around 250 jobs at Natural Resources Wales are at risk as the agency seeks to make £13m in spending cuts.
  - Swansea Airport Ltd, the owners of Swansea Airport, have agreed to give up their lease of the airport after 23 years following a protracted legal battle with Swansea City Council.
  - A mural of Huw Edwards unveiled in his home town of Llangennech, Carmarthenshire in 2023, has been removed after he admitted to possessing indecent images of children.
- 6 August – The Senedd is recalled to elect a new First Minister, with Eluned Morgan nominated as the first woman to hold the post.
- 7 August – Mark Drakeford returns to government after he is appointed Health Secretary by Eluned Morgan.
- 8 August – Huw Edwards is expelled from the Gorsedd of Bards, membership of which is one of the highest accolades in Welsh public life.
- 9 August –
  - Former sub-postmaster Noel Thomas is admitted to the Gorsedd of Bards, and receives a standing ovation.
  - Former prison officer Jodie Beer is sentenced to six years in prison after attempting to smuggle Class A drugs into Parc Prison in February 2024.
  - Conservative Senedd member Laura Anne Jones apologises for her use of an ethnic slur about Chinese people during a WhatsApp discussion about TikTok.
- 12 August – Ammanford school stabbing: During a hearing at Swansea Crown Court, a 14-year-old girl admits wounding two teachers and a pupil, but pleads not guilty to attempted murder.
- 14 August – A report published by NHS Wales says that ageing hospitals and delays in discharging people from hospital during the COVID-19 pandemic meant the health service struggled to control the spread of the virus.
- 17 August –
  - Around 100 firefighters attend a fire which breaks out at a car dealership in Tredegar.
  - Six appliances from Mid and West Wales Fire and Rescue Service attend after fire breaks out at Mumbles Pier in Swansea Bay. The pier is closed until further notice.
- 19 August –
  - First Minister Eluned Morgan holds her first meeting with Prime Minister Keir Starmer since taking office.
  - Reform UK announce three Independent councillors in the Llantarnam ward of Torfaen had joined Reform UK, becoming Wales' first elected Reform politicians.
- 25 August – Research has suggested homes in Wales have the highest number of refuse bins per household.
- 28 August –
  - Three people are killed in a crash near Beaumaris Pier in Anglesey.
  - First Minister Eluned Morgan is appointed a Privy Councillor.
- 29 August – Police begin a murder investigation and arrest a 41-year-old woman following the death of a six-year-old boy at a property in Swansea.

=== September ===
- 1 September –
  - A 41-year-old woman is charged with the murder of a six-year-old boy in Swansea.
  - Cyngor Gwynedd adopts new rules that require homeowners in the area to submit a planning application if they wish to turn a property into a second home or a holiday let.
- 6 September – Following a hearing at Cardiff Crown Court, National Grid is fined £3.2m after an electricity pylon worker sustained "catastrophic and lifechanging injuries" after receiving a 33,000 volt shock and 40% burns when the electricity supply was not turned off while he carried out maintenance work at Treforest in December 2020.
- 7 September – Former First Minister Vaughan Gething confirms he will not stand for re-election at the 2026 Senedd election.
- 9 September –
  - Transport for Wales expands its penalty fare zone to include trains travelling on lines in South Wales, and the Welsh Marches line, meaning anyone travelling without a ticket could face a fine worth £20 or double their train fare, whichever is more expensive.
  - Former Gwent Police officer John Stringer is found guilty of sexually abusing a girl under the age of 13 following a trial at Cardiff Crown Court.
- 10 September – Swansea resident Emma Cullen, who has multiple sclerosis, becomes the person in the UK to receive the drug ocrelizumab.
- 11 September –
  - The UK government has agreed to give Tata Steel £500m to help towards the cost of building a greener electric furnace at Port Talbot after reaching a "new and improved" deal.
  - Eluned Morgan carries out her first cabinet reshuffle, which includes appointing Jeremy Miles as Health Minister and Mark Drakeford as Finance Minister.
- 13 September –
  - The Why Not Bar in Aberystwyth, Ceredigion, wins a legal case at the Court of Appeal in an ongoing £1.5m insurance case for compensation over losses when it was forced to close in March 2020 as a result of the COVID-19 pandemic.
  - A criminal gang who admitted flooding Aberystwyth with drugs, after setting up a carwash and barber's shop as a front for the operation, are sentenced at Swansea Crown Court, receiving sentences ranging from an 18 month suspended sentence to imprisonment of twelve years.
- 14 September – Former transport minister Lee Waters says that "more common sense" should have been applied to the introduction of Wales's 20 mph speed limit.
- 16 September –
  - Huw Edwards, formerly the BBC's most senior news presenter, is given a six-month suspended jail sentence for child abuse image offences. He is placed on the sex offenders' register for seven years and is required to complete a rehabilitation programme.
  - The Welsh Government scraps plans to force parties in the Senedd to ensure 50% of their candidates are women.
- 19 September – Ten new Welsh words are included in the Oxford English Dictionary because of their everyday use in Wales; they include twp (meaning foolish or daft), sglods (chips) and Senedd (the Welsh Parliament).
- 24 September –
  - Senedd members vote to withdraw proposals to require parties to ensure 50% of their candidates are women.
  - Flintshire County Council rejects a proposal that would have required anyone working in teaching to swear an oath not to engage in an inappropriate relationship with a pupil.
- 25 September – Conservative Senedd member Natasha Asghar is reprimanded by Senedd authorities for calling Wales' 20 mph speed limit a "blanket" policy on social media, while signing off a report advising her party to refrain from using the term.
- 27 September – The Senedd Commission forecasts it will need an extra £1.2m in 2025–26 to prepare for a larger Senedd at the 2026 election.
- 28 September – Three cases of the Bluetongue 3 virus are discovered in sheep in Wales for the first time.
- 30 September – The final blast furnace at the Port Talbot steelworks ceases operation, ending the traditional method of making steel in South Wales.

=== October ===
- 1 October
  - The Transport Salaried Staffs' Association (TSSA) is to ballot train staff at Transport for Wales on potential strike action over pay.
  - A secondary school in Cardiff suspends its Twitter account amid what it describes as concerns over racism on the social media site.
- 3 October – The new North Wales Medical School is officially opened by the First Minister at the Bangor University.
- 5 October – Police launch an investigation following the sudden deaths of two people at a property in Cardiff.
- 6 October – The 2024 Cardiff Half Marathon takes place, with a record 29,000 participants.
- 8 October – Welsh rapper Lemfreck wins the 2024 Welsh Music Prize for his album Blood, Sweat and Fears.
- 9 October
  - The trial of a 14-year-old girl accused of the attempted murder of two teachers and a pupil collapses after what is described as a "great irregularity in the jury" that rendered the trial "irretrievably compromised". A retrial is set for 27 January 2025.
  - Leena Sarah Farhat, a member of Llanfairfechan Town Council, is suspended by the Liberal Democrats after sharing a social media post that appeared to celebrate the 7 October attacks.
- 10 October – Steve Davies, a former councillor with Ceredigion County Council and Aberystwyth Town Council, is disqualified from holding public office for three years after sending unwanted love letters and gifts to a number of women.
- 11 October – At the Plaid Cymru Annual Conference, the party's four Westminster MPs back a motion calling for a sporting and economic boycott of Israel over the war in Gaza.
- 12 October – Plaid Cymru votes to adopt the motion calling for a sporting and economic boycott of Israel.
- 16 October –
  - Heavy rain leads to flooding and disruption to train services across Wales.
  - Welsh-language soap opera Pobol Y Cwm celebrates the 50th anniversary of its first episode being broadcast.
  - A soldier, later named as Cpl Christopher Gill, of 4th Battalion, The Ranger Regiment, dies in what the Ministry of Defence describes as a "non-operational incident" in Brecon.
- 17 October –
  - The Parole Board approves the release of Jeffery Gafoor, who has served 21 years in prison for the 1988 murder of Lynette White in Cardiff.
  - Tanya Nasir, who lied to obtain a nursing job at the Princess of Wales Hospital in Bridgend, is sentenced to five years in prison at Merthyr Tydfil Crown Court.
- 19 October – Llanbrynmair, Powys becomes the first area in the UK where every resident has access to ultrafast broadband.
- 20 October – An amber weather alert is in place for western Scotland and the north and west of Northern Ireland as Storm Ashley arrives in the UK; yellow alerts are issued for other parts of Scotland, Northern Ireland and the Welsh coast.
- 21 October –
  - A man is killed and 15 people treated in hospital following a low-speed crash between two trains near the village of Llanbrynmair in Powys.
  - 49-year-old woman Joanne Jones disappears in Pontypridd.
- 22 October – The Welsh Government pays a £19m tax bill for the environment agency, Natural Resources Wales, following a HM Revenue and Customs investigation into how the agency hired specialist contractors.
- 23 October – The Senedd votes 26–19 to defeat a motion calling for a new law to allow assisted dying in England and Wales.
- 24 October – Lee Waters announces he will step down from the Senedd at the 2026 election.
- 25 October –
  - Gwent Police officer Huw Orphan is sentenced to two and a half years in prison after he broke his wife's back by kicking her down stairs.
  - More than 20 firefighters tackle a fire on Pentre Industrial Estate in Sandycroft, Flintshire.
  - Princess of Wales Hospital in Bridgend announces that their maternity unit, scheduled to be closed temporarily for a 12-week refurbishment, will now stay shut until early 2025.
- 26 October – The search for missing woman Joanne Jones is expanded to the forests of Llanwonno.
- 27 October – A body found the previous evening is confirmed by South Wales Police to be that of missing woman Joanne Jones.

=== November ===
- 2 November – Two women are killed, and two men taken to hospital, one of them in a serious condition, following a crash on the A4050 at Barry, Vale of Glamorgan.
- 5 November – A report into the train crash that occurred in mid Wales in October indicates that a safety system designed to help stop the train failed on one of the trains involved.
- 8 November –
  - Mateusz Sikorski is sentenced to 28 months in prison after he killed a taxi driver in a crash while driving on the wrong side of the road in Pembrokeshire in September.
  - Former nurse Charlotte Brown, who caused a man life changing injuries during a crash while she was drink driving, is struck off the nursing register.
- 12 November –
  - Former Welsh government legal advisor Mick Antoniw and ex-minister Julie Morgan tell BBC News that subject to being passed at Westminster, the Terminally Ill Adults (End of Life) Bill would require a vote in the Senedd to become legal in Wales.
  - Geraint Evans is appointed as the new chief executive of S4C.
  - The Welsh Government announces that registered childcare premises in Wales will retain their small business rates relief status on a permanent basis, meaning they will not have to pay tax.
- 26 November – The Senedd is expected to introduce the Levy and Registration bill to allow councils in Wales to raise a tax from visitor accommodation.
- 15 November – Darren Brown, a former member of Bridgend Town Council, is sentenced to 18 years in prison for the attempted murder of his wife, who he stabbed while she tried to soothe their baby in July 2023.
- 16 November – Protesters gather outside Welsh Labour's party conference to oppose changes to inheritance tax for farmers outlined in the October budget as Prime Minister Sir Keir Starmer defends the government's changes.
- 17 November – Sir Ed Davey, the leader of the Liberal Democrats, says that Jane Dodds, who leads the party in Wales, should reflect on her position after a report found she made a "grave error of judgement" in her handling of a sexual abuse scandal when she worked for the Church of England.
- 19 November –
  - First Minister Eluned Morgan offers Plaid Cymru an open invitation to support the Welsh Government's budget, scheduled to be delivered by Finance Secretary Mark Drakeford on 10 December.
  - Health Secretary Jeremy Miles announces that private healthcare will be used to help reduce the patient backlog in the NHS, with £50m allocated for health to be given to Wales's health boards to provide more appointments, tests and treatments.
- 22 November –
  - Dilshad Shamo and Ali Khdir, two men who ran a people smuggling operation from a car wash in Caerphilly and asked those they smuggled to give a TripAdvisor-style rating for their journey, plead guilty to people smuggling midway through their trial.
  - Appearing at Swansea Crown Court, Papaipit Linse, of Haverfordwest, pleads guilty to the manslaughter of her seven-year-old son, Louis Linse, in January 2024, on the grounds of diminished responsibility. She will be sentenced on 13 December.
- 23 November –
  - Storm Bert:
    - Five adults and five children are rescued from a house in Denbighshire following a landslide as high winds and heavy rain bring disruption to Wales.
    - A search begins for a man in his 70s believed to have been swept away while walking a dog with his wife in Conwy County.
- 24 November –
  - Police searching for a man missing since the previous day after he was swept away by a river recover a body.
  - South Wales bassist Ursula Harrison is named BBC Young Jazz Musician 2024.
- 25 November –
  - South Wales politicians, including MP Sir Chris Bryant and MS Heledd Fychan, have criticised what they describe as a lack of preparation and insufficient warnings ahead of the arrival of Storm Bert.
  - The Welsh Government publishes the Levy and Registration bill to allow councils in Wales to raise a tax from visitor accommodation, with the £1.25 per person per night levy expected to be introduced from 2027.
  - Two teenage boys are arrested following the stabbing of a 12-year-old girl in Barry Island the previous day.
- 26 November –
  - Police announce that Daniel Andreas San Diego, one of America's most wanted men, was arrested in Wales the previous day 21 years after two bombings in San Francisco.
  - First Minister Eluned Morgan says Wales needs better flood warnings following damage brought about by Storm Bert.
- 28 November – BBC News Wales reports that Senedd Conservatives will hold a vote of confidence in Welsh Conservative leader Andrew RT Davies on 3 December following a series of criticisms about his leadership.
- 29 November – New rules come into law requiring tattoo artists in Wales to meet stricter hygiene and safety standards to be awarded a licence.

=== December ===
- 1 December – Properties on a housing estate in Merthyr Tydfil are evacuated after a sinkhole opens up following the collapse of a culvert.
- 3 December –
  - Andrew RT Davies resigns as leader of the Welsh Conservatives shortly after narrowly surviving a vote of confidence by Senedd members by nine votes to seven.
  - Sports Direct removes a £6 beanie from its website after misspelling the word Cymru as Cyrmu [sic].
  - South Wales Police relaunches its free soft drinks scheme for designated drivers over the festive period.
- 4 December –
  - Welsh Conservative leader Andrew RT Davies tells BBC News Wales there has been "plotting" among Conservative Senedd members to oust him since April.
  - The Welsh Government announces that Welsh tuition fees will increase to £9,535 from September 2025.
- 5 December – Darren Millar is elected unopposed as leader of the Welsh Conservatives following the resignation of Andrew RT Davies.
- 7 December – Storm Darragh: Around 95,000 homes are left without power after Storm Darragh brings high winds and heavy rain to Wales, while the roof is torn off Pentre Baptist Church in Mochdre, Powys.
- 8 December – Around 73,000 homes in Wales remain without power following Storm Darragh.
- 9 December – A hearing at Merthyr Crown Court finds that a 15-year-old boy attempted to murder a teenage girl after stabbing her at Cadoxton railway station in January; the boy, who cannot be named for legal reasons, is given a hospital detention order after being found unfit to stand trial under the Mental Health Act.
- 10 December – Finance Secretary Mark Drakeford announces there will be an extra £1.5bn spent on healthcare in Wales in the forthcoming Welsh Government budget.
- 12 December – Welsh Conservatives leader Darren Millar unveils his Shadow Cabinet.
- 13 December –
  - South Wales Police and Gwent Police become the first forces in the UK to use Operator Initiated Facial Recognition (OIFR), an app that uses facial recognition to identify people.
  - Papaipit Linse is given an indefinite hospital order for the manslaughter of her son, Louis Linse.
- 15 December – Ireland's national postal service, An Post, abandons its plans to use Holyhead Port for Christmas deliveries as the port remains closed until 18 December as a result of damage caused by Storm Darragh.
- 16 December – Cardiff Airport introduces Next Generation Security scanners, meaning passengers can leave electronic devices and liquids under 100ml in their hand luggage as they go through security.
- 17 December –
  - The Port of Holyhead confirms it will stay closed until at least 15 January 2025 as assessment and repairs are carried out following damage caused by Storm Darragh.
  - Democracy and Boundary Commission Cymru unveils the names of the 16 constituencies that will make up the enlarged Senedd from 2026, with all but four of them known by exclusively Welsh language names.
  - The Welsh Conservatives reaffirm their commitment to devolution following a social media post by MS Joel James, who said he wanted to get "rid" of the Senedd; the post, in response to the announcement of the constituencies for the 2026 election, was swiftly deleted.
- 20 December –
  - Triple murderer Brian Whitelock, who killed his neighbour, Wendy Buckney, following release from a previous life sentence, is sentenced to a whole life prison term meaning he will never be considered for parole.
  - Richard Lacey, an inventor of a breathalyser device, is banned from driving for drink-driving after being tested by one of the devices he helped to invent.
- 22 December –
  - Llancaiach Fawr living history museum in Caerphilly county closes for the final time as a result of council budget cuts.
  - The John Steinbeck novel Of Mice and Men will not be studied at GCSE level in Wales from September 2025 amid concerns over racism and racial slurs.
- 27 December –
  - Patients and visitors to hospitals in South Wales are advised to wear masks to help curtail the spread of flu.
  - Val Dancer, ridden by Charlie Hammond, wins the 2024 Welsh Grand National.
- 29 December – The Met Office issues yellow weather warnings for 75 mph gusts of wind and heavy rain for New Year's Day.
- 30 December –
  - The Welsh Ambulance Service declares a critical incident because of an increase in the number of emergency calls and delays in handing over patients to hospitals.
  - 2025 New Year Honours: Among those to be recognised in the New Year Honours are former rugby union player Gerald Davies, who receives a knighthood, and Paralympian Sabrina Fortune, who receives an MBE.
- 31 January – Holyhead Port is scheduled to partially reopen on 16 January following damage caused by Storm Darragh.

== Arts and culture ==
=== National Eisteddfod of Wales at Pontypridd ===
- Chair: Carwyn Eckley
- Crown: Gwynfor Dafydd, "Atgof"
- Prose Medal: Eurgain Haf
- Drama Medal: not awarded
- Gwobr Goffa Daniel Owen: withheld

=== Urdd National Eisteddfod ===
- Chair: Lois Medi
- Chair: Tegwen Bruce-Deans

=== Awards ===
- Wales Book of the Year 2024:
  - English language: Tom Bullough, Sarn Helen
  - Welsh language: Mari George, Sut i Ddofi Corryn

=== Music ===
==== Albums ====
- Cowbois Rhos Botwnnog – Mynd â’r tŷ am dro (Welsh Language Album of the Year)
- Feeder – Black/Red
- Georgia Ruth – Cool Head
- Kelly Jones – Inevitable Incredible

==== New classical works ====
- Huw Watkins – Horn Concerto (2024)

=== Broadcasting ===
==== English language television ====
- Lost Boys and Fairies (with some Welsh dialogue) by Daf James, starring Siôn Daniel Young, Gwyneth Keyworth and William Thomas
- Tree on a Hill, English-language version of the Welsh-language series Pren ar y Bryn, starring Rhodri Meilir
- The Way, by James Graham, Michael Sheen and Adam Curtis, directed by Sheen and starring Luke Evans, Steffan Rhodri, Paul Rhys and Sheen himself.

==== Welsh language television ====
- Creisis, starring Gwydion Rhys and Sara Gregory
- Bariau, starring Gwion Tegid

=== Video games ===
- 8 August – Tales from the Mabinogion

== Sport ==
- 10 January – Gemma Grainger stands down as manager of the Wales women's national football team to take up the position of head coach with Norway.
- 12–18 February – The Welsh Open snooker tournament is held at Llandudno.
- 26 February – Rhian Wilkinson is appointed as manager of the Wales women's national football team.
- 16 March – Wales national rugby union team head coach Warren Gatland reveals he offered to resign his position after Wales attained the first Six Nations wooden spoon in 21 years, but his offer was rejected by Welsh Rugby Union chief executive Abi Tierney.
- 4 May – Jak Jones reaches the final of the 2024 World Snooker Championship, where he loses 14–18 to Kyren Wilson.
- 9 July – Craig Bellamy is appointed manager of the Wales national football team.
- 30 July – Welsh swimmer Matt Richards, wins his second medal of the 2024 Summer Olympics in Paris, a gold shared with the rest of the British Men's 4 × 200 metre freestyle relay team.
- 15 August – Steve Williams resigns as president of the Football Association of Wales with immediate effect.
- 7 November – Ioan Cunningham resigns as head coach of the Wales women's national football team following what he describes as a turbulent 2024.
- 20 December – Cyclist Emma Finucane is named 2024 BBC Cymru Wales Sports Personality of the Year.
- 27 December – The 2024 Welsh Grand National takes place at Chepstow Racecourse. The race is won by Val Dancer, trained by Mel Rowley and ridden by Charlie Hammond.

== Deaths ==
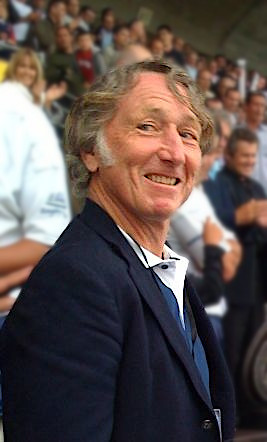
JPR Williams

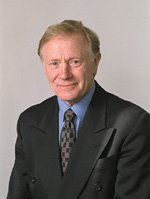
Owen John Thomas

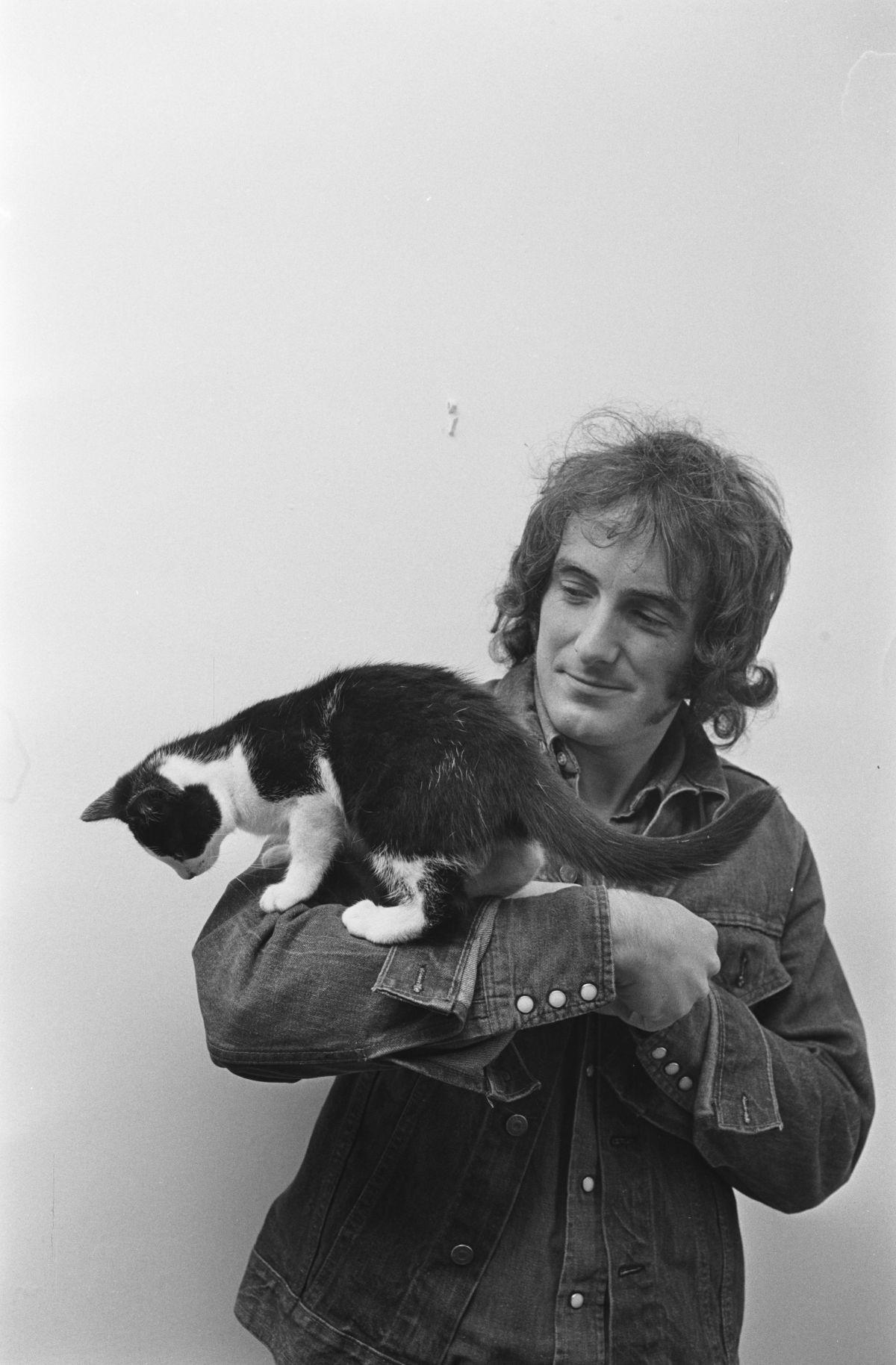
Dewi 'Pws' Morris

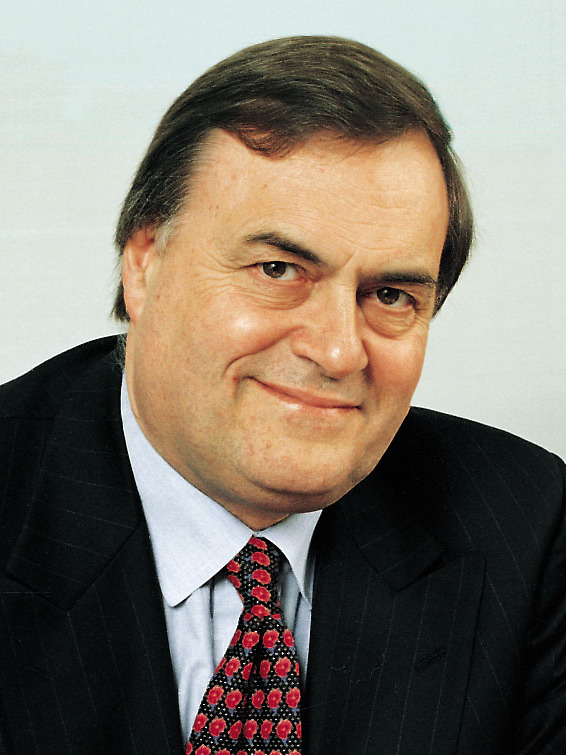
John Prescott

- 4 January
  - (in the United States) Glynis Johns, actress of Welsh ancestry, 100
  - Leah Owen, 70, singer and singing teacher. (death announced on this date)
- 6 January – Malcolm Price, 86, rugby union and rugby league player.
- 8 January – J. P. R. Williams, 74, rugby union player (Barbarians, British & Irish Lions, national team).
- 26 January – Graham Drury, 71, motorcycle speedway rider.
- 4 February – Barry John, 79, rugby union player (Cardiff, Barbarians, national team).
- 17 February – Bill Francis, 76, rugby league player (Wigan, national team, Great Britain).
- 19 February – Ewen MacIntosh, 50, comic actor
- 4 March – Lewis Jones, 92, rugby union (Llanelli, national team) and rugby league (Leeds, Great Britain) player. (death announced on this date)
- 10 March – Karl Wallinger, 66, Welsh musician (The Waterboys, World Party) and songwriter ("Ship of Fools").
- 14 March
  - (date death announced) – Mal Lucas, 85, footballer
  - Zonia Bowen, 97, English-born writer, founder of Merched y Wawr
- 17 March – Morfydd E. Owen, 88, academic
- 3 April (in Canada) – Joan Hollobon, 104, Canadian writer brought up in Rhyl
- 8 April – Keith Barnes, 89, Welsh-born Australian Hall of Fame rugby league player (Balmain Tigers, New South Wales, national team), coach and commentator.
- 19 April – Leighton James, 71, Welsh footballer (Burnley, Swansea City, national team).
- 23 April – George Baker, 88, Welsh footballer (Plymouth Argyle, national team).
- 24 April – John O'Shea, 83, Welsh rugby union player (Cardiff RFC, British & Irish Lions, national team). (death announced on this date)
- 1 May – Terry Medwin, 91, football player (Swansea City, Tottenham Hotspur, national team) and manager.
- 14 May – Owen John Thomas, 84, politician, MNA (1999–2007). (death announced on this date)
- 24 May – Derek Morgan, 88, Welsh-English rugby union player (Northumberland, England national team).
- 29 May – Sir Mansel Aylward, 81, public health physician and academic
- 30 May – Trevor Edwards, 87, footballer (Charlton Athletic, Cardiff City, national team). (death announced on this date)
- 6 June – Glan Letheren, 68, footballer
- 13 June – Courtney Meredith, 97, Welsh rugby player (British Lions, national team).
- 19 June – Claudia Williams, 90, Welsh artist.
- 9 July – Ian Buckett, 56, Welsh rugby union player (Swansea RFC, London Welsh, national team).
- 19 July – Ray Reardon, 91, snooker player, six-times world champion, cancer.
- 19 July – Margaret Jones, 105, artist
- 27 July – Peter Morgan, 65, Welsh rugby player (British & Irish Lions, Llanelli, national team).
- 2 August – Alun Carter, 59, Welsh rugby union player (Pontypool RFC, national team).
- 9 August – Carl Bevan, 51, rock drummer (60 Ft. Dolls) and painter. (death announced on this date)
- 22 August
  - Delwyn Williams, 85, lawyer and politician
  - Dewi 'Pws' Morris, 76, actor, writer and musician. (death announced on this date)
- 2 September – Derek Draper, 81, Welsh footballer (Swansea City, Bradford Park Avenue, Chester City), complications from dementia. (death announced on this date)
- 22 September – Brian Huggett, golfer, 87
- 11 October – Kevin Bowring, rugby player (London Welsh) and coach (national team), 70 (death announced on this date)
- 29 October – Phil Rickman, novelist and BBC Radio Wales presenter, 74
- 14 November – Dennis Bryon, drummer (Amen Corner, Bee Gees), 75.
- 20 November – John Prescott, Baron Prescott, 86, politician, deputy prime minister (1997–2007), first secretary of state (2001–2007), and MP (1970–2010).
- 26 November – Idris Niblett, 93, footballer (Hereford United, Barry Town).
- 1 December
  - David Griffith, 88, Anglican clergyman, Archdeacon of Montgomery 1998–2002.
  - Terry Griffiths, 77, Welsh professional snooker player, world champion (1979).
- 17 December – Mary Keir, 112, British supercentenarian, oldest person in Wales (since 2021).
- 26 December – Geoff Wheel, 73, Welsh rugby player (Mumbles, Swansea, national team).
- 27 December – Frank Wilson, 80, Welsh rugby union (Cardiff RFC) and rugby league (St Helens, Salford) footballer.

== Holidays ==
- 1 January – New Year's Day
- 29 March – Good Friday
- 1 April – Easter Monday
- 6 May – Early May bank holiday
- 27 May – Spring May Bank Holiday
- 26 August – Summer Bank Holiday
- 25 December – Christmas Day
- 26 December – Boxing Day

== See also ==
- 2024 in Northern Ireland
- 2024 in Scotland
- 2024 in Ireland
