= Public law (disambiguation) =

Public law is the area of law concerned with the relationship between the state and the citizen.

Public Law may also refer to:

- Public Law (journal), an academic law journal
- Public Law (United States), an Act of Congress affecting the general public
  - Public bill, a United States government bill which proposes a public law
- The Public Law Project, an independent, national legal charity in Great Britain
- Public international law, law that concerns the structure and conduct of sovereign states

== See also ==
- for articles on specific Public Laws
- Private Law (disambiguation)
- Public general acts, public laws passed by the Parliament of the United Kingdom
