= Private law (disambiguation) =

Private law is the area of law concerned with relationships between individual persons (citizens and companies).

Private law may also refer to:

- Private international law, a procedure of resolving conflicts within domestic laws
- Civil law (private law), In England and Wales, law relating to civil wrongs and quasi-contracts
- An Act of Congress in the United States relating to specific institutions or individuals

== See also ==
- Public law (disambiguation)
- Private law society, a political philosophy which advocates the elimination of the state
- Local and Personal Acts of Parliament in the United Kingdom, private laws in the United Kingdom
- Private bill, a proposal for a private law
- Private member's bill, in some parliaments a bill introduced by a member not on behalf of the executive government
