= Senedd Standards of Conduct Committee =

The Senedd Standards of Conduct Committee is appointed by the Senedd in Wales to oversee the work of the Senedd Commissioner for Standards.

== History ==
The committee was created in 1999, and implements section 31 the Government of Wales Act 2006: "preventing conduct which would constitute a criminal offence or contempt of court" and a "a sub judice rule." Following this a committee on standards of conduct was established under the standing orders of the Senedd.
