= Murder of Aamir Siddiqi =

2010 murder case in the United Kingdom

- Location: Cardiff, Wales
- Date: 11 April 2010; 16 years ago
- Target: Aamir Siddiqi
- Attack type: Stabbing
- Perpetrators: Jason Richards; Ben Hope
- Motive: Mistaken identity in a contract killing relating to a property dispute

Aamir Siddiqi was a boy from Cardiff, South Wales. In April 2010, at the age of 17, Siddiqi was killed in his family's home in the Roath area of Cardiff. On 1 February 2013 Jason Richards, 38, and Ben Hope, 39, were convicted of his murder; they had intended to kill a different person. Later that month they were both sentenced to life imprisonment, and ordered to serve a minimum of 40 years.

== Background ==
Aamir Siddiqi was born in 1992 to Iqbal Siddiqi, a retired civil servant, and his wife Parveen. In April 2010 they were living at 110 Ninian Road, Cardiff.

At around the same time Jason Richards ran a car garage in Cardiff. A man with a history of drug dependence, Richards had several previous convictions for violent offences including robbery and blackmail. He led what was described as a "chaotic and violent" lifestyle and had spent periods in prison. In one incident in 1996, Richards attacked an off-duty police officer and another man in Cardiff city centre. Both men were badly injured with one suffering a skull fracture, and Richards was sentenced to 27 months imprisonment for grievous bodily harm. In another incident, Richards was imprisoned for 18 months for actual bodily harm following an attack on his wife in 2004.

Richards met Ben Hope, who also had a history of violence and drug problems, whilst incarcerated. The two developed a friendship which continued after their release. In 2010 they were approached by a local businessman who proposed they carry out the killing of a man with whom he had been in a property dispute, for £1,000.

== Attack ==
On the afternoon of Sunday 11 April 2010, Richards and Hope went to the Siddiqis' home on Ninian Road. Both had been using drugs. Hearing the two men knock, and expecting a visit from his imam for a Koran lesson, Aamir ran to open the front door, where he was confronted by the two men on the doorstep. They immediately attacked Siddiqi, stabbing him multiple times in the neck and chest. Siddiqi attempted to escape by running back into the house but Richards and Hope pursued him, continuing the assault. Siddiqi's parents attempted to intervene and were also stabbed.

The men left the house shortly afterwards and Siddiqi's parents called the police. On their arrival it was clear that Siddiqi was gravely injured. The address is about half a mile from the University Hospital of Wales but there was a 20-minute delay in the arrival of an ambulance, during which time the police officers in attendance administered CPR and unsuccessfully attempted to revive Siddiqi.

== Investigation and trial ==
Both men were arrested days after the attack took place and were tried in late 2012. CCTV footage from around Cardiff was used to trace their movements before and after the attack. Both defendants were linked to a stolen Volvo XC90 which was seen speeding from the scene of the attack – traces of Siddiqi's blood were found in the car's footwell, along with Richards' DNA. Hope's fingerprints were found on the steering wheel. Both men blamed the other for the killing.

During the trial, it emerged that the men had been approached by a local man to carry out a killing over a property dispute. The intended target lived on Shirley Road, adjacent to Ninian Road where the Siddiqis lived. The two defendants went to Ninian Road in error, a mistake described as an act of "staggering incompetence" by the prosecution.

== Verdict and aftermath ==
On 1 February 2013 Richards and Hope were found guilty of murder at Swansea Crown Court. On 12 February they were both sentenced to life imprisonment, with the judge imposing a minimum terms of 40 years. Members of the Siddiqi family described the sentence as "appropriate".

Richards immediately appealed his conviction, and both men appealed their sentences in January 2014. The appeals were rejected in June 2014.

During the investigation a local man named Mohammed Ali Ege emerged as a suspect, potentially as the person responsible for commissioning the crime. He was arrested on suspicion of conspiracy to commit murder in India in October 2011. He escaped custody whilst using a toilet at a Delhi railway station as Indian authorities were in the process of extraditing him to the UK and has not been seen since.
