= Ffos-y-fran Land Reclamation Scheme =

Open-pit coal mine in south Wales

Coordinates: 51.73°N 03.36°W

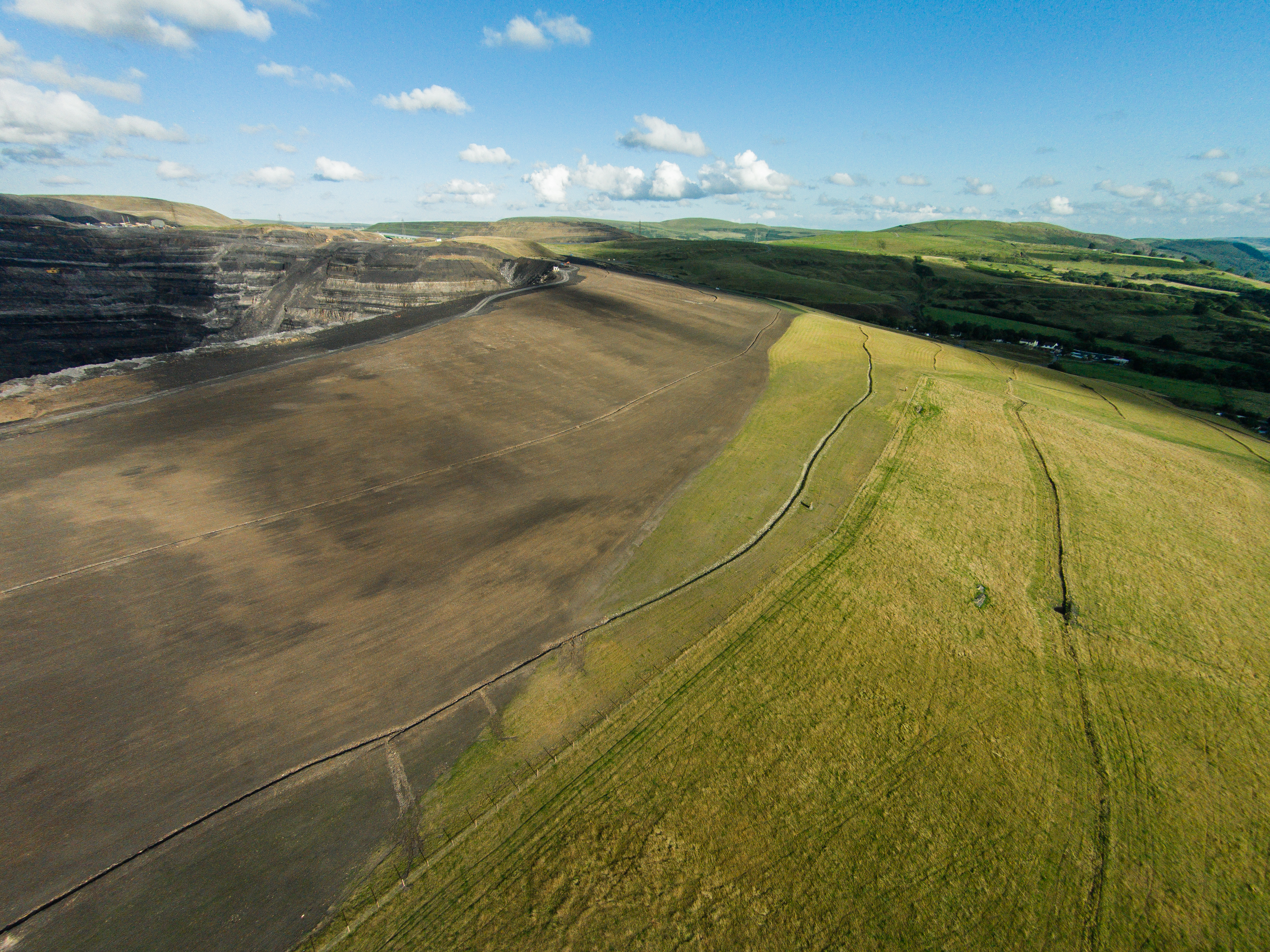
View across the Ffos-y-fran Land Reclamation Scheme

The Ffos-y-fran Land Reclamation Scheme was a major opencast coaling operation to the north-east of Merthyr Tydfil in South Wales. It was the last major opencast mine in the UK, and it shut down in November 2023 with restoration planned to start in 2024.

The contracted excavator/reclaiming company was Merthyr (South Wales) Ltd (previously called Miller Argent), which is owned by Gwent Investments Limited, a privately owned family business based in South Wales. The scheme development was the last part of the East Merthyr Reclamation scheme, and planned to extract 10 million tonnes of coal over 15 years starting from 2007, with the intention of using part of the revenue to redevelop the current former industrial workings into residential and recreational use.

The opencast coal mine has provoked criticism at a local and national scale, including objections on health and safety grounds as to the close proximity of housing to the site, concerns of the despoiling of the landscape, and global concerns of the contribution of coal to climate change. A number of protests have occurred on and around the site.

The license of the site expired in September 2022; an application for a 9-month extension was filed with Merthyr Tydfil Council. That application was refused in April 2023, meaning the site would have to close. In August 2023, the company announced that the mine will close by the end of November 2023. The mine shut down in November 2023 as planned.

== Background ==
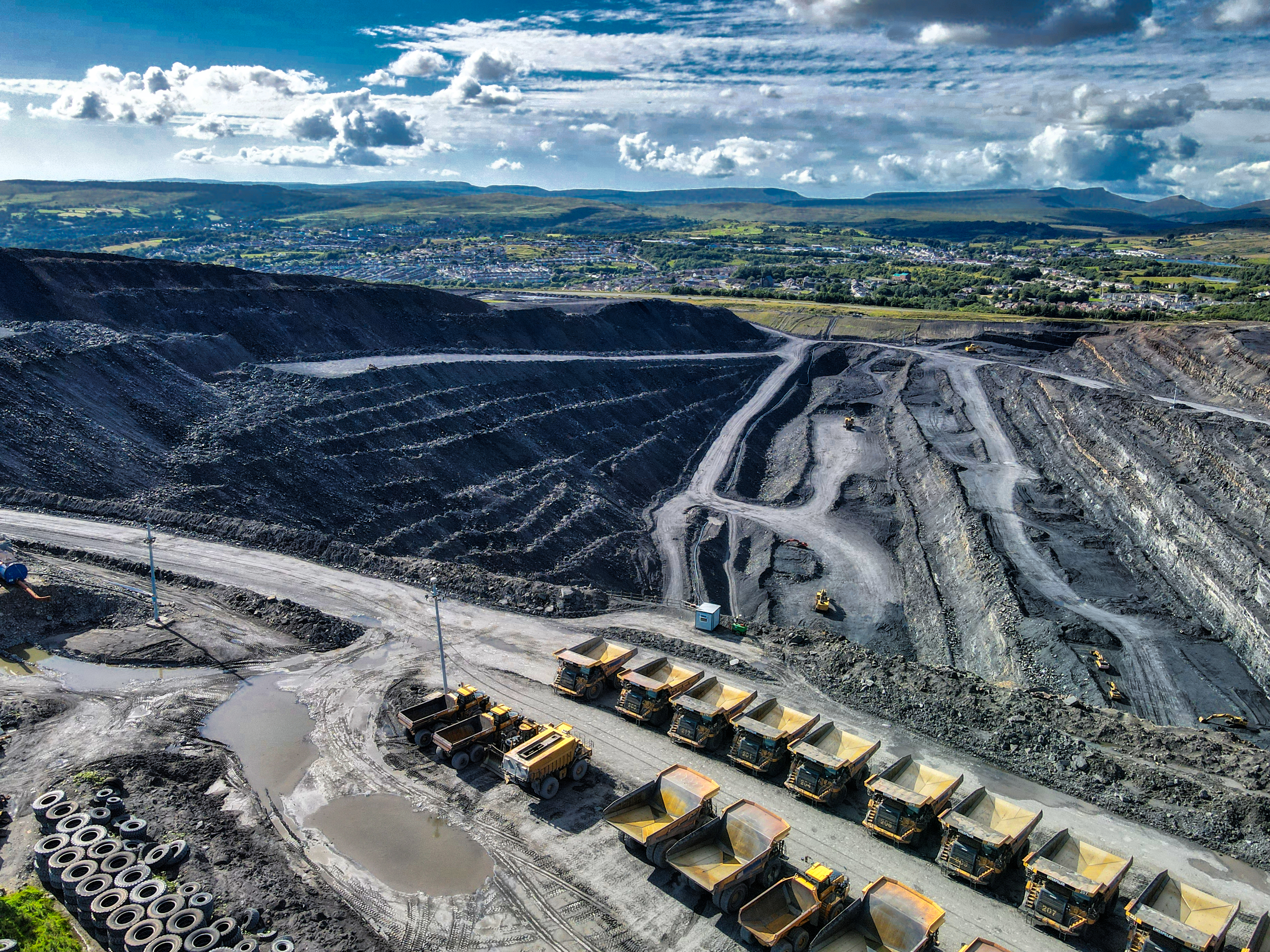
Ffos-y-fran Land Reclamation Scheme

Following the 18th century development of Merthyr as an industrial centre, and the shut-down of the deepcast coal mining industry from the 1930s through to the 1980s, the area to the east of Merthyr Tydfil has suffered severe dereliction. The East Merthyr Reclamation Scheme was the initiative of the former Merthyr Tydfil Borough Council and Mid Glamorgan County Council, in partnership with the Welsh Development Agency in the mid-1980s and was launched by the Secretary of State for Wales following the grant of planning permission. The aim was to extract coal from the area of East Merthyr by the cheapest and most profitable means, rather than detracting from it and its environment. The East Merthyr Reclamation Scheme is made up of three phases, each with the objective of reclaiming the derelict and dangerous land to the east of Merthyr Tydfil, using revenues from surface coal mining operations, restoring the land to beneficial use at no cost to the public purse.

Phases I 'Incline Top' and II the Dowlais 'Great White Tip' of the scheme were completed in 1993 and 1997 respectively, restoring 106 ha of derelict land to provide residential, light industrial and recreational uses. The 'Ffos-y-fran Land Reclamation Scheme', represents the third, and final, stage of the wider East Merthyr Reclamation Scheme. It is the largest of the original three phases and will restore over 360 ha of previously derelict and disturbed land. Once completed, the land, which will be fit for upland grazing, with safe access for use by the community, will be returned to the planning authority.

== Planning ==
Planning consent for Phase III was granted in November 1988. However, local debates continued over the nature and scale of the development which will lead to the extraction of 10 m tonnes of coal over 15 years; as well as commercial concerns over the size of the coal reserve, together with access rights to the land. Protesters said that if the scheme proceeded, it would mean work taking place just a few hundred metres away from homes in the villages of Dowlais, Mountain Hare, and Penydarren; some houses would be less than 40 m from the boundary of the site.

In 1994 the scheme was revised to claim a larger coal reserve in line with government guidance, termed Phase IIIA. This was withdrawn in May 1999 due to access rights issues.

Access rights were resolved by Miller Argent in 2003, and a new application was brought to Merthyr Council and the Welsh Assembly. In February 2005 the Welsh Assembly approved the Ffos-y-Fran scheme, but the High Court quashed the decision after it was claimed by local residents that Environment Minister Carwyn Jones had made his mind up before the planning committee met.

Mr Jones denied the claim and the Welsh Assembly took the case to appeal judges, who gave final approval of the scheme on 27 November 2006.

== Scale ==
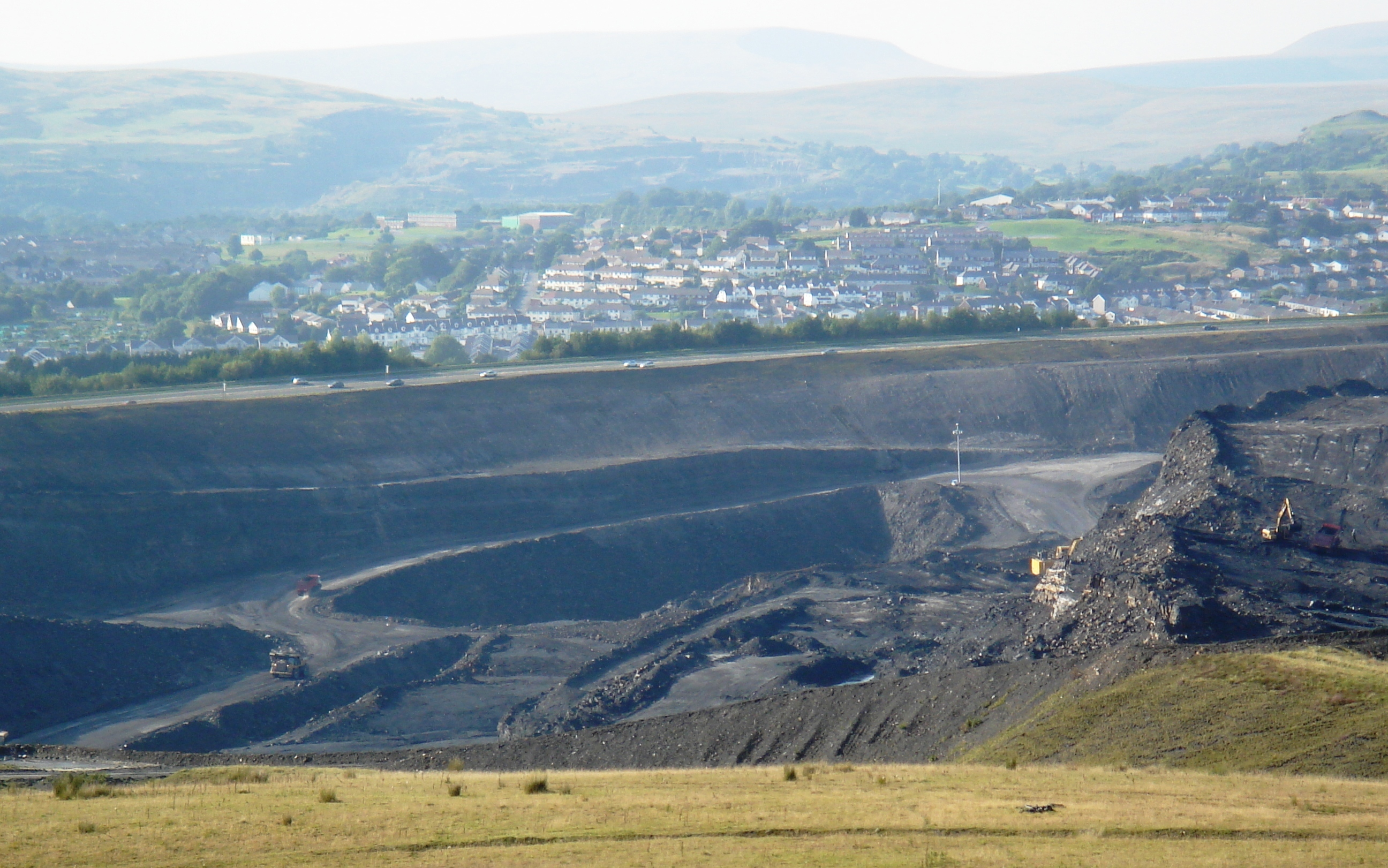

The Ffos-y-fran Land Reclamation Scheme is the largest of the original three phases and will restore derelict land, including the removal of known shafts previously associated with iron ore and coal workings, to finally complete the original land reclamation scheme.

Statistics surrounding the site which include:

- Phase III in total covers 3,500 acres (14 km^{2}) of land
- Since 2002 the council have removed 58 burnt out and stolen cars from the site
- 200 people will be employed on the site, with an additional estimated 400 jobs created within the local area
- The scheme at peak production extracted 20,000 tonnes of coal per week

== Transport ==
Under agreed planning rules, the vast majority of coal that left the site was transported by rail. Extracted coal was moved from the mine and taken to be separated and washed at the sites Cwmbargoed Washery. Built in 1959 on land to the north and east of the railway connection to Fochriw Colliery, the coal washery was refurbished by Celtic Energy in 1992. In the summer of 2015, Miller Argent launched its state of the art coal washing facility on site - built at a cost of £10 million. The facility was built to meet demand for high quality Welsh coal by the Tata steel works site in Port Talbot.

The washed coal was taken from site by rail along the former route of the Rhymney Railway. Joining the modern Rhymney Line just south of Ystrad Mynach railway station, the trains then traveled onwards via Cardiff and then west along the Vale of Glamorgan Line. In March 2017, Miller Argent sent its last delivery of coal to Aberthaw Power Station.

== See also ==
Akbelen Forest - woodland in Turkey being cut down to make way for opencast coal mine expansion
