= Senedd Commissioner for Standards =

Officer of the Senedd

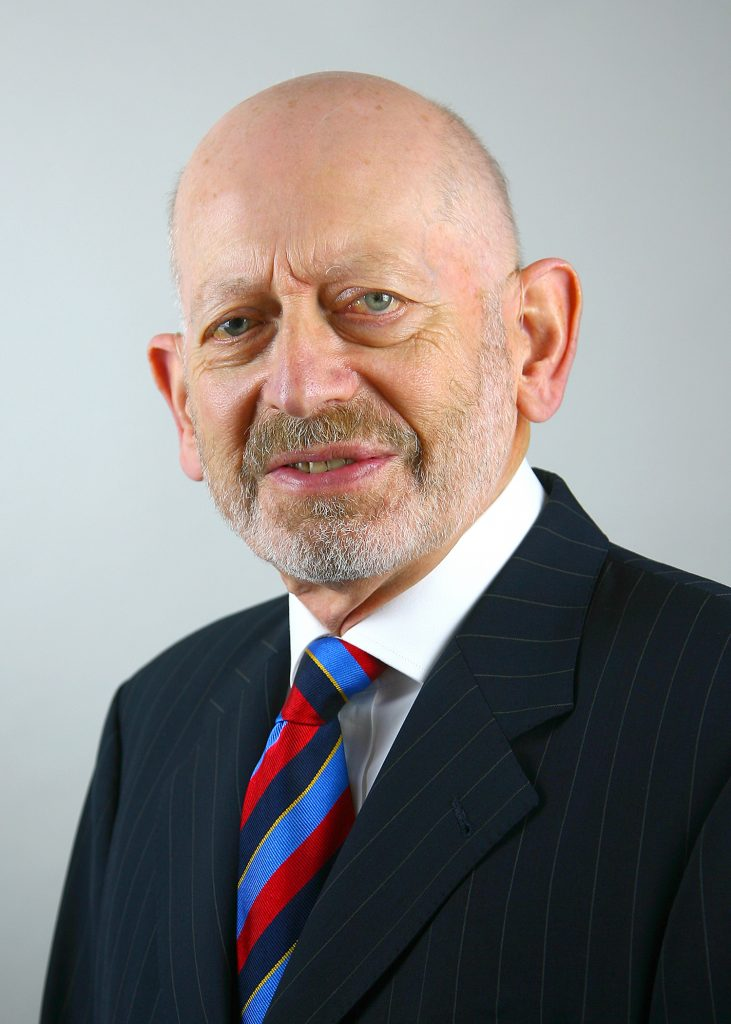
- Incumbent; Douglas Bain since November 2019
- Type: Commissioner
- Reports to: Senedd
- Appointer: Senedd Standards of Conduct Committee
- First holder: Gerard Elias
- Website: standardscommissionerwales.org/the-commissioner/

The Senedd Commissioner for Standards is an officer of the Senedd. The work of the officer is overseen by the Senedd Standards of Conduct Committee.

The current commissioner is Douglas Bain.

== Duties ==
The commissioner is in charge of regulating MSs' conduct and propriety. One of the commissioner's main tasks is overseeing the Register of Members' Financial Interests, which is intended to ensure disclosure of financial interests that may be of relevance to MSs' work.

The Senedd has no equivalent to the Independent Complaints and Grievance Scheme to refer cases to.

The Senedd Commissioner for Standards is appointed by a motion of the Senedd and is an independent officer of the House, working a four-day week.

== History ==
National Assembly for Wales Commissioner for Standards Measure 2009
- Measure of the National Assembly for Wales
- National Assembly for Wales
- Long title: A Measure of the National Assembly for Wales to establish a Commissioner to investigate complaints about the conduct of Assembly Members and to report to the Assembly on the outcome of such investigation; and for connected purposes.
- Citation: 2009 nawm 4

Dates
- Royal approval: 9 December 2009

Status: Amended

Text of statute as originally enacted

Text of the National Assembly for Wales Commissioner for Standards Measure 2009 as in force today (including any amendments) within the United Kingdom, from legislation.gov.uk.

The post was established in 1995 with Sir Gerard Elias as the first commissioner, serving the Senedd Standards of Conduct Committee.

The current commissioner, Douglas Bain, began his tenure on 13 November 2019.
