= Swansea Crown Court =

Judicial building in Swansea, Wales

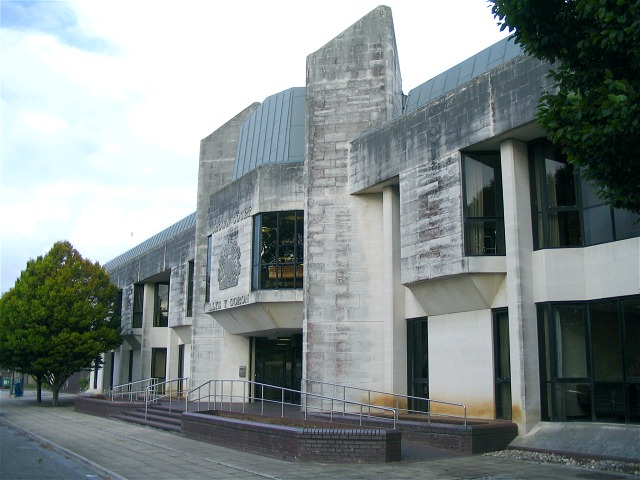
- Swansea Crown Court

- Shown in Swansea
- 51.6145°N 3.9576°W
- Location: St Helen's Road, Swansea

History
- Built: 1988

Site notes
- Architect: Sir Alex Gordon
- Architectural style: Neoclassical style

Swansea Crown Court is a Crown Court venue which deals with criminal cases at St Helen's Road in Swansea, Wales.

== History ==
Until the late 1980s, judicial hearings in Swansea were held in the west wing of Swansea Guildhall. However, as the number of court cases in southwest Wales grew, it became necessary to commission a dedicated courthouse for criminal matters. The site chosen, which was close to the guildhall but on the opposite side of St Helen's Road, had been occupied by an old tramway depot.

The new building was designed by the Welsh architect Sir Alex Gordon in the neoclassical style, built in concrete at a cost of £5.2 million, and was completed in 1988. The design involved a symmetrical main frontage of eleven bays facing onto St Helen's Road. The central bay featured a wide opening on the ground floor and a prominent bipartite oriel window on the first floor which was enhanced by a carved Royal coat of arms placed between the two parts. The central bay was flanked by two full-height triangular piers. Internally, the building was laid out to accommodate three courtrooms. The custodial area was extensively refurbished at a cost of £220,000 in August 2013.

Notable cases have included the trial and wrongful conviction, now recognised as a serious miscarriage of justice, of Yusef Abdullahi, Stephen Miller and Tony Paris, in November 1990, for the murder of Lynette White. Other cases have also included the trial and conviction of Jason Richards and Ben Hope, in February 2013, for the murder of Aamir Siddiqi, and the trial and conviction of an unnamed man, in October 2019, on 36 counts of rape and one count of an assault by penetration against his own daughters.
