= Abi Tierney =

British civil servant

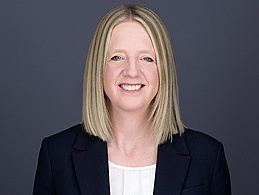
- Tierney in 2020
- Born: November 1973 (age 52)
- Occupation: Business executive
- Title: CEO of Welsh Rugby Union 2023–present); Director-General of HM Passport Office 2020–2023

Abi Tierney is a British civil servant who, on 16 August 2023, was appointed as the first female chief executive of the Welsh Rugby Union (WRU). Prior to her appointment by the WRU, Tierney served as Director-General of HM Passport Office and UK Visas and Immigration, a post she had held since February 2020. She was also appointed by the Home Office as their Ethics Adviser in June 2023 however, no longer holds the post since being appointed as the CEO of the Welsh Rugby Union. Her pre-Civil Service career included the role of Business Development Director at Serco Health and Director of Strategic Leadership at Aberdeen City Council between 2005 and 2009.
