= The Public Law Project =

The Public Law Project is a legal charity based in London which aims to improve access to public law remedies for those whose access is restricted by poverty, discrimination or other similar barriers. To fulfil its objectives, Public Law Project undertakes research, policy initiatives, casework and training across the range of public law remedies.

== History ==
The Public Law Project was established in 1990. Founder members of Public Law Project included Kate Markus, Melvin Coleman, Patrick Lefevre, Dave Perry, Hilary Kitchen, Jerry Fitzpatrick, Richard de Friend, Dr Clive Grace, John Wadham, and Lord Justice Stephen Sedley.

== Case work ==
Most of The Public Law Project's casework is judicial review, though it also deals with Ombudsman cases and other forms of dispute resolution where appropriate. Cases are taken on referral from solicitors and by other organisations or charities such as Age Concern or National Association for Voluntary and Community Action. The Public Law Project does not take cases on directly from members of the public. It deals primarily with test cases. For example, in a key judicial review case brought by the Public Law Project a BME women's group called Southall Black Sisters was successful in challenging the decision of the council of the London Borough of Ealing to withdraw the group's funding.
