= 2023–24 in Welsh football =

Welsh football league

Football in Wales
- Season: 2023–24

2023–24 in Welsh football
- Cymru Premier champions
- Cymru North champions
- Cymru South champions
- Adran Premier winners
- Adran North winners
- Adran South winners
- Teams in Europe
- The New Saints, Connah's Quay Nomads, Penybont, Haverfordwest County, Cardiff City Women
- Welsh national team(s)
- UEFA Euro 2024 qualifying, UEFA Women's Nations League

The 2023–24 season is the 32nd season of competitive football in Wales. The domestic season began on 21 July 2023, with the Cymru Premier League Cup first round matches alongside the first round of matches of the Cymru North and Cymru South which began on 28 July 2023. The first round of matches in the Cymru Premier were played on 11 August 2023.

== League competitions ==
=== Cymru Premier ===
Pos	Team	Pld	W	D	L	GF	GA	GD	Pts	Qualification or relegation (Note: Teams played each other twice (22 matches), before the league was split into two groups (the top six and the bottom six).)
1	The New Saints (C)	32	30	2	0	117	18	+99	92	Qualification for the Champions League first qualifying round
2	Connah's Quay Nomads	32	18	5	9	70	43	+27	59	Qualification for the Conference League first qualifying round (Note: The 2023–24 Welsh Cup winners also qualified for the Conference League first qualifying round. Since the cup winners (Connah's Quay Nomads) qualified based on league position, the Conference League spot was passed to the third-placed team.)
3	Bala Town	32	13	12	7	38	31	+7	51	Qualification for the Conference League first qualifying round
4	Newtown	32	13	5	14	49	46	+3	44	Qualification for the Conference League first qualifying round play-off
5	Caernarfon Town (O)	32	11	8	13	52	70	−18	41	Qualification for the Conference League first qualifying round play-off
6	Cardiff Metropolitan University	32	10	9	13	35	63	−28	36 (Note: Cardiff Metropolitan University were deducted three points for fielding an ineligible player against Bala Town on 3 February 2024.)	Qualification for the Conference League first qualifying round play-off
7	Penybont	32	14	7	11	46	37	+9	43 (Note: Penybont were deducted six points for fielding ineligible players.)	Qualification for the Conference League first qualifying round play-off
8	Haverfordwest County	32	11	10	11	39	40	−1	43	
9	Barry Town United	32	7	11	14	36	54	−18	32	
10	Aberystwyth Town	32	7	6	19	27	57	−30	27	
11	Colwyn Bay (R)	32	7	4	21	34	66	−32	25	Relegation to Cymru North
12	Pontypridd United (R)	32	8	7	17	23	41	−18	22 (Note: Pontypridd United were deducted nine points for failing to pay players on time, failing to comply with contractual player obligations, failing to register players correctly, and fielding ineligible players.)	Relegation to Cymru South

Source: Cymru Premier
Rules for classification: 1) Points; 2) Goal difference; 3) Head-to-head points; 4) Goals scored; 5) Matches won.
(C) Champions; (O) Play-off winners; (R) Relegated

=== Cymru North ===
Pos	Team	Pld	W	D	L	GF	GA	GD	Pts	Promotion or relegation
1	Holywell Town (Note: Holywell Town were ineligible for promotion after being refused a licence for the 2024–25 Cymru Premier.) (C)	30	26	3	1	79	17	+62	81	
2	Flint Town United (P)	30	25	3	2	94	30	+64	78	Promotion to Cymru Premier
3	Airbus UK Broughton	30	23	5	2	84	28	+56	74	
4	Mold Alexandra	30	18	1	11	66	50	+16	55	
5	Bangor 1876	30	17	2	11	62	55	+7	53	
6	Denbigh Town	30	15	4	11	71	60	+11	49	
7	Ruthin Town	30	12	6	12	58	52	+6	42	
8	Guilsfield	30	11	7	12	48	46	+2	40	
9	Caersws	30	10	9	11	60	53	+7	39	
10	Gresford Athletic	30	10	7	13	47	54	−7	37	
11	Buckley Town	30	10	6	14	54	60	−6	36	
12	Llandudno	30	10	1	19	59	80	−21	31	
13	Prestatyn Town	30	7	5	18	39	74	−35	23 (Note: Prestatyn Town were deducted three points for fielding an ineligible player against Mold Alexandra on 31 December 2023.)	
14	Porthmadog (R)	30	6	4	20	35	66	−31	22	Relegation to Ardal NE or Ardal NW
15	Chirk AAA (R)	30	3	4	23	32	82	−50	13	Relegation to Ardal NE or Ardal NW
16	Llanidloes Town (R)	30	2	3	25	25	106	−81	9	Relegation to Ardal NE or Ardal NW

Source: Cymru North
Rules for classification: 1) Points; 2) Goal difference; 3) Goals scored; 4) Matches won; 5) Play-off.
(C) Champions; (P) Promoted; (R) Relegated

=== Cymru South ===
Pos	Team	Pld	W	D	L	GF	GA	GD	Pts	Promotion or relegation
1	Briton Ferry Llansawel (C, P)	30	23	2	5	87	39	+48	71	Promotion to Cymru Premier
2	Llanelli Town	30	20	4	6	80	40	+40	64	
3	Ammanford	30	17	6	7	60	42	+18	57	
4	Cambrian & Clydach Vale BGC	30	14	8	8	60	37	+23	50	
5	Caerau (Ely)	30	15	4	11	72	60	+12	49	
6	Carmarthen Town	30	12	11	7	50	39	+11	47	
7	Afan Lido	30	14	4	12	68	56	+12	46	
8	Goytre United	30	12	7	11	58	59	−1	43	
9	Cwmbran Celtic	30	12	6	12	69	64	+5	42	
10	Baglan Dragons	30	11	8	11	46	41	+5	41	
11	Trefelin BGC	30	10	8	12	47	63	−16	38	
12	Llantwit Major	30	9	8	13	44	54	−10	35	
13	Taff's Well	30	8	8	14	44	49	−5	32	
14	Pontardawe Town (R)	30	8	8	14	52	70	−18	32	Relegation to Ardal SE or Ardal SW
15	Abertillery Bluebirds (R)	30	3	6	21	34	94	−60	15	Relegation to Ardal SE or Ardal SW
16	Abergavenny Town (R)	30	2	2	26	20	84	−64	8	Relegation to Ardal SE or Ardal SW

Source: Cymru South
Rules for classification: 1) Points; 2) Goal difference; 3) Goals scored; 4) Matches won; 5) Play-off.
(C) Champions; (P) Promoted; (R) Relegated

=== Adran Premier ===
Pos	Team	Pld	W	D	L	GF	GA	GD	Pts	Qualification
1	Cardiff City	20	17	1	2	62	12	+50	52	Qualification for the UEFA Women's Champions League first round
2	Swansea City	20	13	4	3	44	21	+23	43	
3	Wrexham	20	11	2	7	41	37	+4	35	
4	Aberystwyth Town	20	4	7	9	22	33	−11	19	
5	The New Saints	20	9	2	9	46	46	0	29	
6	Cardiff Metropolitan University	20	6	5	9	28	41	−13	23	
7	Barry Town United	20	6	1	13	23	45	−22	19	
8	Pontypridd United	20	1	4	15	15	46	−31	7	Relegation to Adran South

Source: Adran Leagues
Rules for classification: 1) Points; 2) Goal difference; 3) Head-to-head points; 4) Goals scored; 5) Matches won.
Teams play each other twice (14 matches), before the league is split into two groups (the top four and the bottom four).

== Honours ==
=== Domestic honours ===
Competition	Winner	Score	Runner-up	Match report
Welsh Cup				
League Cup				
Women's Cup				
Amateur Trophy				
Youth Cup				

=== Non-league honours ===
Level	Competition	Winner
3	Ardal NE	
3	Ardal NW	
3	Ardal SE	
3	Ardal SW	
4	North East Wales Football League Premier Division	
4	North Wales Coast East Football League	
4	North Wales Coast West Football League	
4	Central Wales Football League North Division	
4	Central Wales Football League South Division	
4	West Wales Premier League	
4	South Wales Alliance League Premier Division	
4	Gwent County League Premier Division	

=== Individual honours ===
==== FAW Wales awards ====
Award	Winner	Team
Cymru Premier Manager of the Season		
Cymru Premier Player of the Season		
Cymru Premier Young Player of the Season		
Cymru North Player of the Season		
Cymru South Player of the Season		
Adran Premier Player of the Season		

== Welsh clubs in Europe ==
=== Summary ===
Club	Competitions	Started round	Final round	Coef.
The New Saints	UEFA Champions League	First qualifying round	First qualifying round	1.500
The New Saints	UEFA Conference League	Second qualifying round	Second qualifying round	1.500
Connah's Quay Nomads	UEFA Europa Conference League	First qualifying round	First qualifying round	1.000
Penybont	UEFA Conference League	First qualifying round	First qualifying round	1.000
Haverfordwest County	UEFA Conference League	First qualifying round	Second qualifying round	1.500
Cardiff City	UEFA Women's Champions League	Round 1 - Semi-finals	Round 1 - Third-place match	1.000
Total				6.000
Average				1.200
