= 2018 Welsh Labour leadership election =

Welsh Labour Party leadership election

- 9 November – 6 December 2018
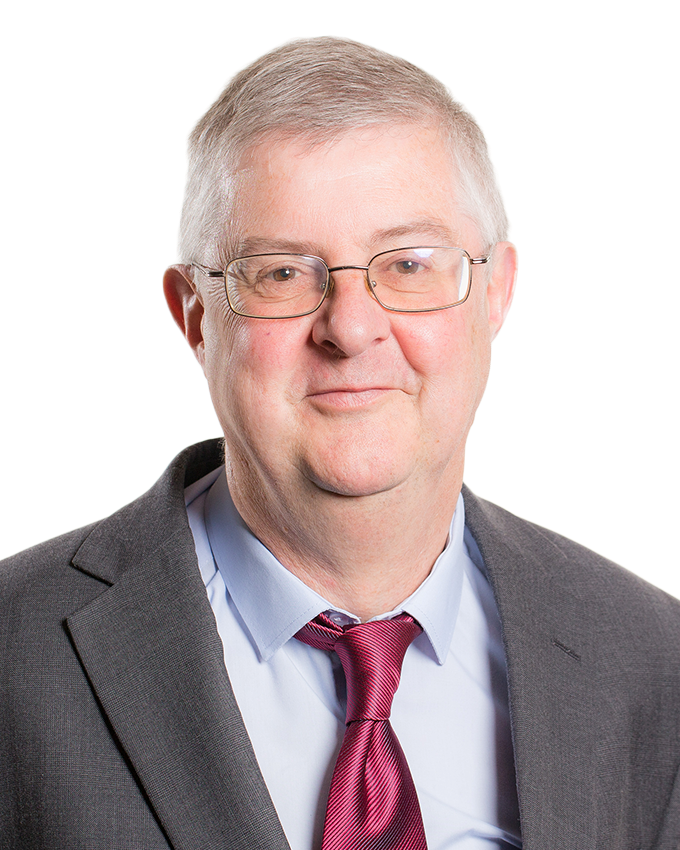

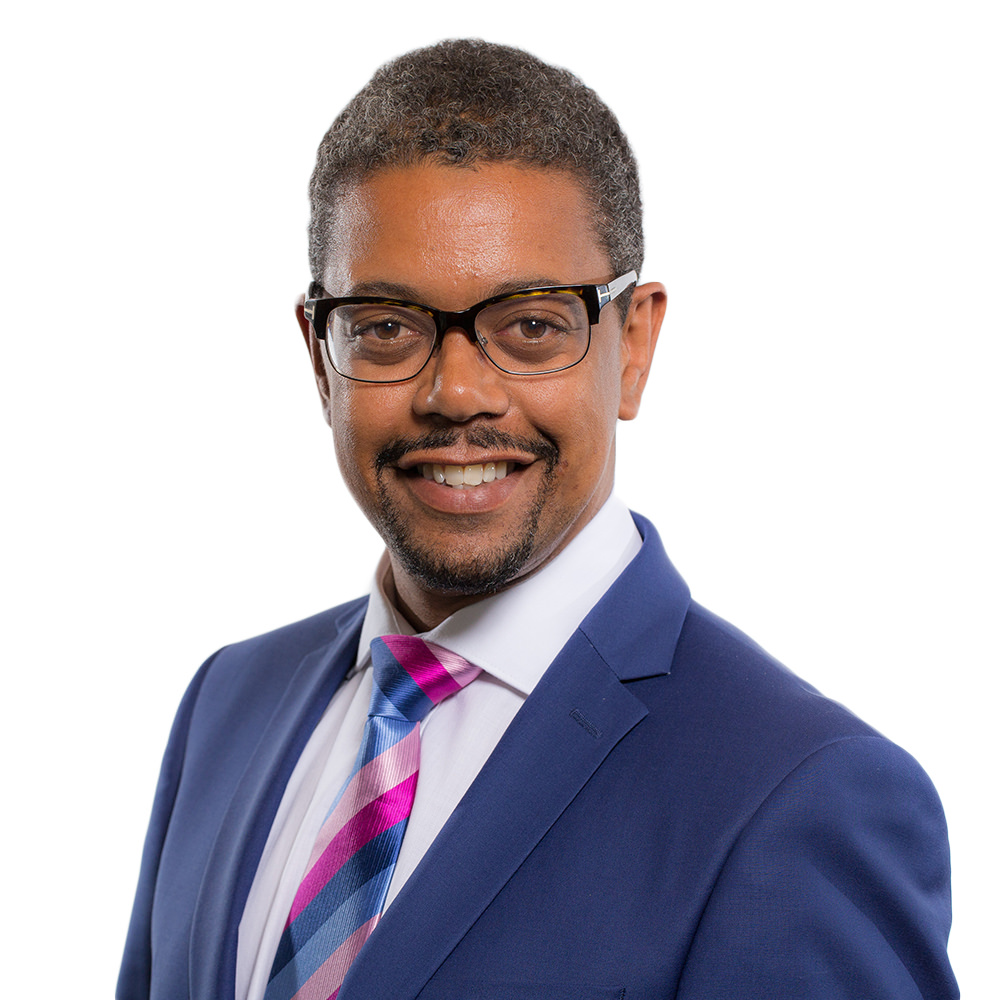

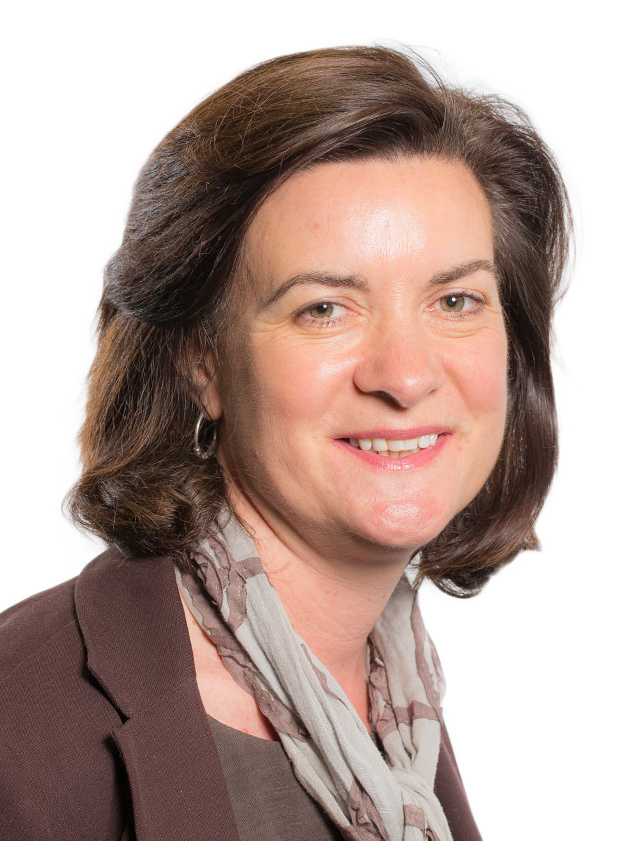
Candidate	Mark Drakeford	Vaughan Gething	Eluned Morgan
First round	46.9%	30.8%	22.3%
Second Round	53.9%	41.4%	Eliminated
Leader before election
Carwyn Jones
Elected Leader
Mark Drakeford

The 2018 Welsh Labour Party leadership election took place between 9 November and 6 December 2018 to elect a successor to Carwyn Jones as leader of the Welsh Labour Party.

Carwyn Jones, who had led Welsh Labour since 2009, announced his intention to resign at the Welsh Labour conference in Llandudno in April 2018. He stated that he would stand down in autumn 2018, and that he would continue to lead the party until then.

== Procedure ==
On 21 April 2018, at the Welsh Labour conference, Carwyn Jones announced that he would retire as First Minister in the autumn. The conference considered whether to change the voting system for electing a party leader and decided to set up a democracy review, which would report back after Jones had retired. However, two days later, pressure began to build for a special conference to address the issue more quickly and to consider changing the voting system from an electoral college to one member one vote. Four trade unions—GMB, Unison, Usdaw and the CWU—protested about this, supporting the continuation of an electoral college, and their position was endorsed by Vaughan Gething. In May and June 2018, Drakeford and Morgan pushed for the holding of such a party conference. It was reported that the supporters of Drakeford believed the existing system favoured Gething. At the end of May, Carwyn Jones himself asked Lord Murphy to carry out an expedited democracy review and to consult on changes in advance of a special conference. At the end of June, Drakeford came out in support of one member, one vote. In mid June, Eluned Morgan announced that she would be standing as leader. In July, Unite broke ranks with the other big unions by coming out in support of a change to one member, one vote.

The special conference took place on 15 September and decided that the system to be used for the forthcoming election would be by one member, one vote, with the votes of individual party members and members of the affiliated organisations carrying the same weight.

Ballot papers were sent out to members on 9 November by email, or by post for those who did not have an email address. The voters had until 3 December to return their ballots. A preferential voting system was used.

The result of the election was announced on 6 December, with Carwyn Jones scheduled to formally resign as First Minister of Wales the following week. His resignation would trigger a vote of all Assembly Members to elect his successor as First Minister.

Welsh Liberal Democrat AM Kirsty Williams had joined Welsh Labour in government following the 2016 assembly election as Cabinet Secretary for Education. She said that she would stay on in post if the same terms were available as those agreed with Carwyn Jones when she joined the government.

Former Plaid Cymru AM Dafydd Elis-Thomas left his party in October 2016 to support the Labour-led government, and joined the government as Minister for Culture, Tourism and Sport in November 2017. This gave the government side a majority of 31 out of the 60 Assembly Members.

All three candidates in the election indicated they would wish for Williams and Elis-Thomas to remain in the government.

=== Timetable ===
- 27 September – Nominations opened
- 3 October – Nominations closed
- 9 November – Ballot papers were despatched
- 6 December – Winner announced
- 11 December – Formal resignation of First Minister
- 12 December – Vote in the Senedd to elect a new First Minister

== Nominations ==
In order to become a candidate, individuals required 20% of current Labour AMs to nominate them. This equated to six AMs, including themselves.

Finance Secretary Mark Drakeford was the first candidate to declare he was standing, shortly after Jones announced he would be stepping down. He immediately secured the support of seven other AMs, ensuring he would be on the ballot. A further nine AMs later announced they were nominating Drakeford, giving him the support of a majority of the Labour Group. He also had the backing of Momentum, a group supporting the national leader Jeremy Corbyn, and had been described as both a "Corbynist" and a pragmatist. Drakeford started the election campaigning as the favourite, although the academic Roger Awan-Scully suggested he might not remain the frontrunner.

Health Secretary Vaughan Gething announced his candidacy on 25 May, with the support of four members of the Assembly, putting himself one nomination short of becoming a candidate. He later achieved the required number of endorsements when Ann Jones announced she would nominate him on 10 August.

Minister for Welsh Language & Lifelong Learning Eluned Morgan announced her intention to run on 11 June 2018, declaring herself to be a 'centre-left candidate'. She didn't receive any further nominations until Huw Irranca-Davies and Alun Davies, who had wanted to stand for the leadership but received no public support from other AMs, withdrew and nominated her. Two other AMs also nominated her, putting her one nomination short of the six required. After Gething received sufficient nominations, he asked that no further AMs nominate him, but instead nominate a female candidate. He suggested that Drakeford himself could nominate Morgan to ensure diversity in the election. National party leader Jeremy Corbyn called for diversity in the choices offered to Welsh Labour members. On 24 September, at the Labour Conference in Liverpool, Carwyn Jones said that if necessary he would nominate Morgan to ensure that there was a woman on the ballot paper, making it clear that he would remain neutral regarding the merit of the candidates.

In addition to nominations from AMs, candidates could receive supporting nominations from Welsh MPs, affiliated trade unions and Constituency Labour Parties (CLPs), to be listed alongside the candidates' names on the ballot paper.

== Campaign ==
Drakeford started the election as the favourite, though academic Roger Awan-Scully cautioned against the assumption that he would go on to win. Drakeford said he would act as a "bridge" to a new generation, and that he would stand aside midway through the next term of the Assembly. His early policy proposals included a pilot of universal baby boxes like those used in Finland and Scotland.

In addition to a formal campaign launch in the Ely area of Cardiff at the community centre where he once worked, Drakeford held a second launch at Northop College to announce his plans for North Wales. He also launched a set of economic policy proposals at the North Wales launch, and later held further policy launch events: a social policy launch in Blackwood and an environmental policy launch in Carmarthen.

In a speech delivered in his former department at Cardiff University, Drakeford set out the political philosophy he called '21st Century Socialism', in which he suggested the Labour Party in Wales should use its traditional socialist principles to find solutions for the challenges facing modern Wales, such as the housing crisis, climate change and Brexit.

Gething put focus on inter-generational poverty, and committed to improving productivity. He also pledged to create a National Care Service to deliver elderly care free at point of use, funded by tax increases or a new care levy.

Gething faced controversy for creating a group separate to his leadership campaign called Together for Labour, which was accused of being a vehicle to keep data after the end of the leadership campaign. He was also criticised for accepting large campaign donations from a company which had been convicted for environmental infringements, another which is a major property developer in his constituency, and another which is owned by a controversial former local Councillor.

Morgan said she would appoint a minister for north Wales, as well as increasing support for the self-employed. She also proposed a universal basic income for Wales, starting by pitching for a pilot to be held in a Welsh community.

Morgan also faced questions about her election expenses, as she did not publicly register any donations to her campaign.

Both Gething and Morgan said they would support a public vote on the final Brexit deal if elected leader, while Drakeford supported the national Labour Party position of only calling for another referendum as a last resort.

== Candidate endorsements ==
Candidate	Political roles	Nominations from AMs	Endorsements
Mark Drakeford	AM for Cardiff West since 2011 Cabinet Secretary for Finance since 2016	17 / 29 58.6% Nominations: Mick Antoniw; Hannah Blythyn; Jayne Bryant; Rebecca Evans; John Griffiths; Lesley Griffiths; Mike Hedges; Jane Hutt; Jeremy Miles; Julie Morgan; Julie James; Rhianon Passmore; Jenny Rathbone; Ken Skates; Jack Sargeant; Lee Waters	Endorsements MPs/MEP: Kevin Brennan, MP for Cardiff West; Ann Clwyd, MP for Cynon Valley; Wayne David, MP for Caerphilly; Nia Griffith, MP for Llanelli; Albert Owen, MP for Ynys Môn; Ian Lucas, MP for Wrexham; Anna McMorrin, MP for Cardiff North; Chris Ruane, MP for Vale of Clwyd; Mark Tami, MP for Alyn and Deeside; Paul Flynn, MP for Newport West; Geraint Davies, MP for Swansea West; Derek Vaughan MEP for Wales; Trade unions: CWU; UNISON; Unite; National Union of Mineworkers; BFAWU; ASLEF; Usdaw; TSSA; CLPs: Aberconwy; Arfon; Brecon & Radnorshire; Caerphilly; Cardiff North; Cardiff West; Carmarthen East and Dinefwr; Ceredigion; Clwyd South; Clwyd West; Cynon Valley; Delyn; Dwyfor Meirionnydd; Gower; Islwyn; Llanelli; Montgomeryshire; Neath; Pontypridd; Rhondda; Swansea East; Swansea West; Vale of Glamorgan; Ynys Môn; Affiliated Groups: Socialist Health Association Wales; Socialist Education Association; Council leaders: Andrew Morgan, leader of Rhondda Cynon Taf Council; Rob Stewart, leader of Swansea Council; Former AMs & MPs: Nick Ainger, former MP for Carmarthen West & South Pembrokeshire; Rosemary Butler, former AM for Newport West; Richard Edwards, former AM for Preseli Pembrokeshire; Sue Essex, former AM for Cardiff North; Brian Gibbons, former AM for Aberavon; Christine Gwyther, former AM for Carmarthen West and South Pembrokeshire; Edwina Hart, former AM for Gower; Gwyn R Price, former AM for Islwyn; Alun Pugh, former AM for Clwyd West; Catherine Thomas, former AM for Llanelli; Gwenda Thomas, former AM for Neath; Individuals: Meena Upadhyaya, geneticist; Unaffiliated groups: Momentum
Vaughan Gething	AM for Cardiff South and Penarth since 2011 Cabinet Secretary for Health & Social Services since 2016	6 / 29 20.7% Nominations: Hefin David; Vikki Howells; Ann Jones; Lynne Neagle; Joyce Watson	Endorsements MPs: Stephen Doughty MP for Cardiff South and Penarth; Owen Smith, MP for Pontypridd; Stephen Kinnock, MP for Aberavon; Council leaders: Huw Thomas, leader of Cardiff City Council; Anthony Hunt, leader of Torfaen County Borough Council; Trade unions: GMB; Community; Affiliated groups: Welsh Young Labour; BAME Labour; CLPs: Torfaen; Cardiff South & Penarth
Eluned Morgan	AM for Mid and West Wales since 2016 Minister for Welsh Language and Lifelong Learning since 2017	6 / 29 20.7% Nominations: Dawn Bowden (Note: Nominated Eluned Morgan but voting for Vaughan Gething.); Alun Davies; Huw Irranca-Davies (Note: Nominated Eluned Morgan but voting for Vaughan Gething.); Carwyn Jones (Note: Nominated Eluned Morgan, will not declare who he is voting for.); David Rees	Endorsements MPs: Tonia Antoniazzi, MP for Gower; Gerald Jones, MP for Merthyr Tydfil and Rhymney; Council leaders: Debbie Wilcox, leader of Newport City Council; Former AMs & MPs: Lord Elystan-Morgan; CLPs: Blaenau Gwent; Preseli Pembrokeshire

=== Withdrawn ===
Huw Irranca-Davies and Alun Davies withdrew on 18 September 2018 to endorse Eluned Morgan.

=== Declined ===
- Ken Skates, Cabinet Secretary for Economy and Transport in the Welsh Government; Assembly Member for Clwyd South since 2011.
- Jeremy Miles, Counsel General for Wales in the Welsh Government; Assembly Member for Neath since 2016.

== Results and turnout ==
The results were announced at the Principality Stadium in Cardiff on 6 December 2018.

Turnout among members was 53.1% (~13,275 votes cast) and among affiliates it was 5.6% (~8,400 votes cast).

== See also ==
- 2018 Welsh Labour deputy leadership election
