= 2009 Welsh Labour leadership election =

Welsh Labour Party leadership election

2009 Welsh Labour Party leadership election
- 2 October – 1 December 2009
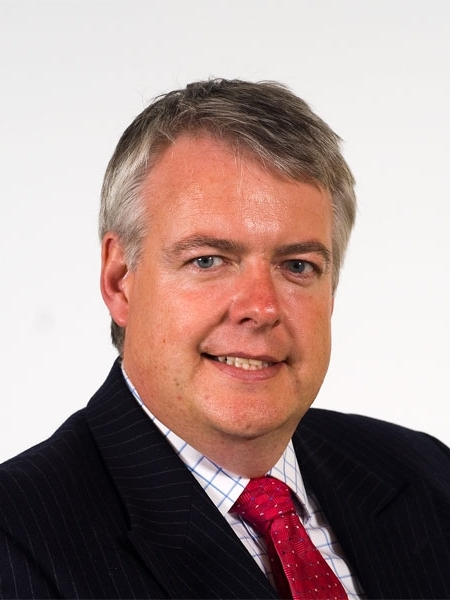

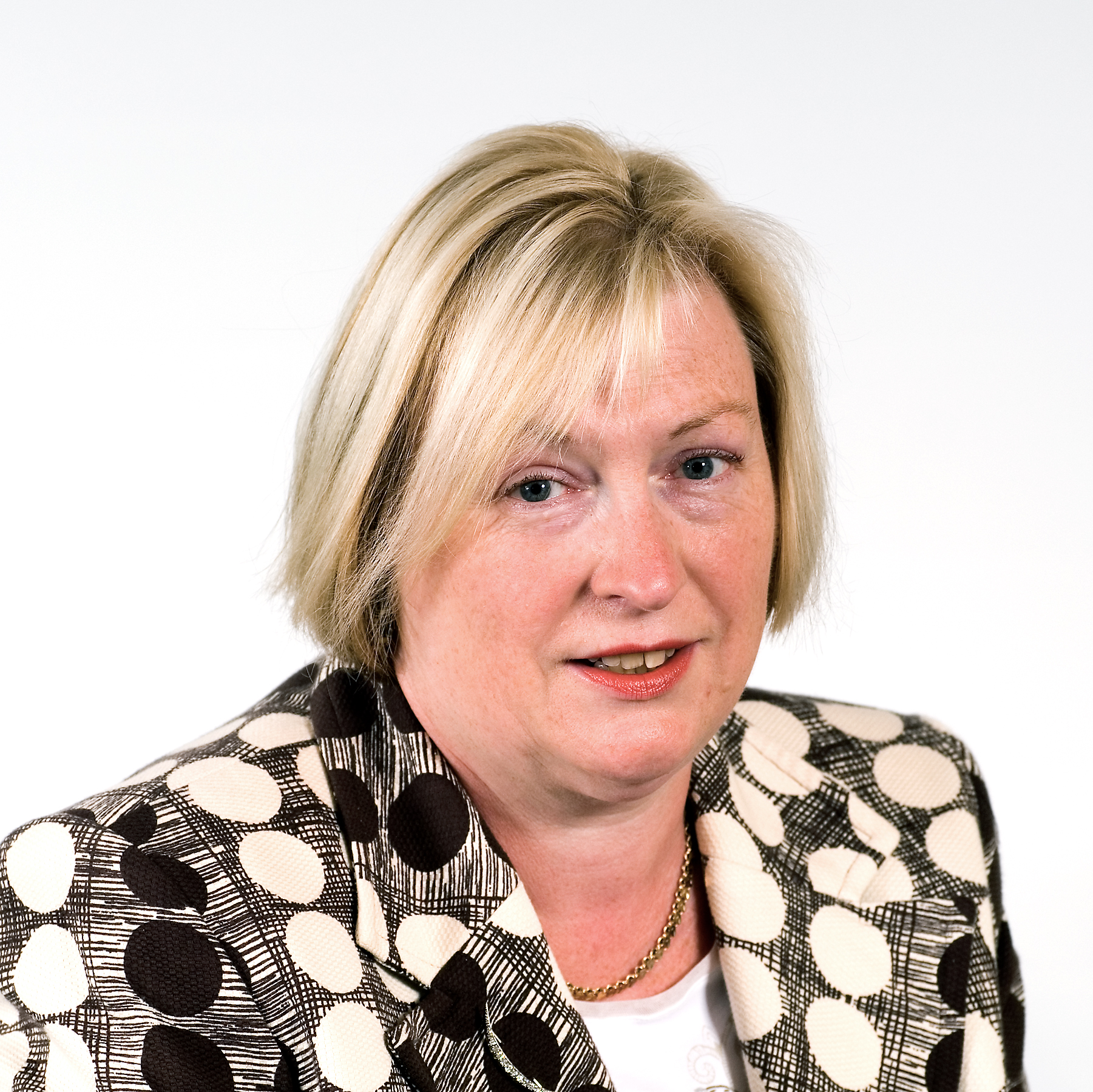

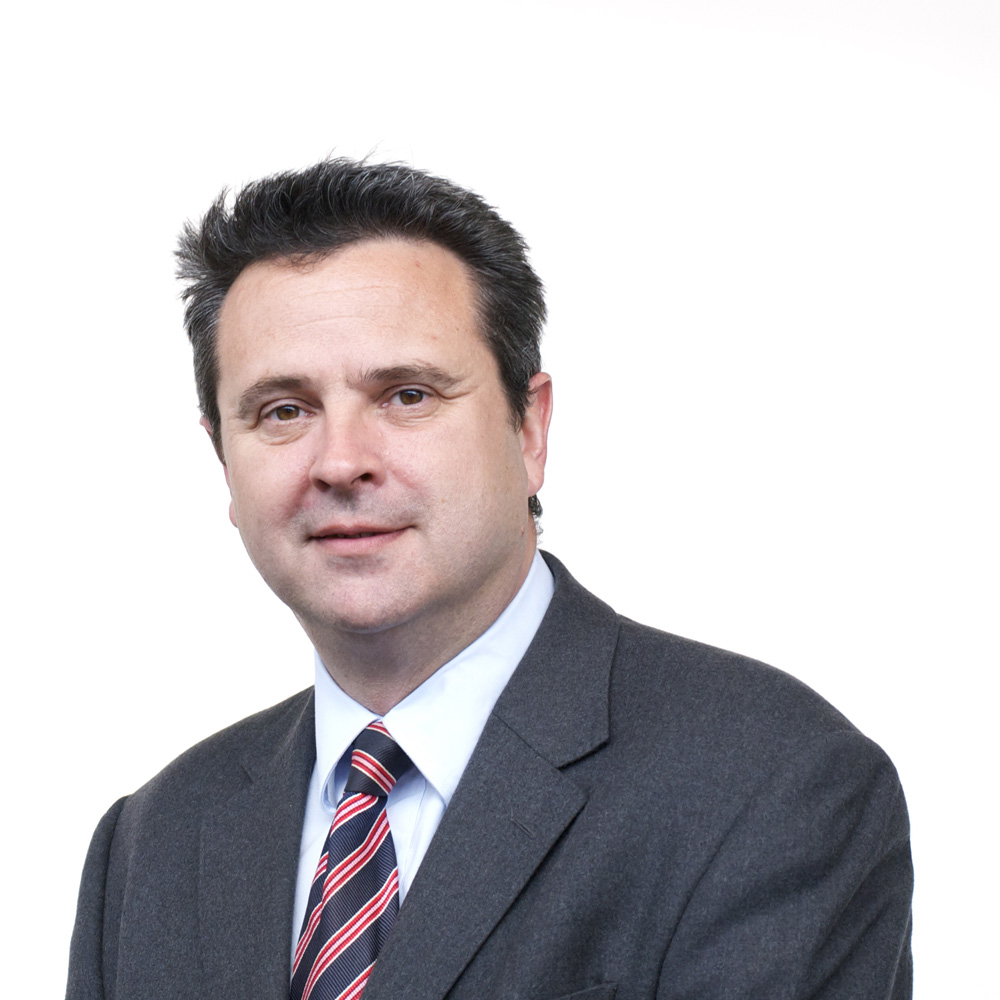
Candidate	Carwyn Jones	Edwina Hart	Huw Lewis
Overall result	52.0%	29.2%	18.8%
Affiliated Unions	51.3%	33.9%	14.8%
Party members	53.7%	25.3%	21.0%
MPs, AMs & MEPs	50.9%	28.3%	20.8%
Leader before election
Rhodri Morgan
Elected Leader
Carwyn Jones

The 2009 Welsh Labour leadership election was held following the resignation of Rhodri Morgan, who stepped down after nine years as First Minister of Wales. Morgan had made clear his intent to resign in 2009 as far back as 2005. As Morgan had been elected unopposed in 2000, this was the first contested election for the Welsh Labour leadership for more than a decade.

The contest concluded on 1 December 2009 and was won on the first round by Carwyn Jones who won in all three sections of the ballot. As Welsh Labour was the senior partner in a Labour/Plaid Cymru coalition government, Jones was confirmed as First Minister the following week and assumed office as First Minister on 10 December 2009. Both Edwina Hart and Huw Lewis served in Jones' governments until their retirement in 2016.

Under Jones, Labour would go on to take office alone as a minority government following the 2011 Assembly election, and retained office in a majority government with Liberal Democrat and Independent support following the 2016 Assembly election.

Jones stood down in late 2018, triggering a new election.

== Voting system ==
The election was conducted under an Electoral College system in which Labour Party members, affiliated trade union members and Welsh Labour elected officials all held an equal share of the votes.

== Candidates ==
To stand, candidates needed the support of a minimum of six (out of a possible 24) including themselves of Labour's Assembly Members.

Three candidates - Counsel General Carwyn Jones, Health Minister Edwina Hart and Merthyr Tydfil and Rhymney AM Huw Lewis - entered the race.

The following were reported as endorsements by the BBC at the close on nominations on 22 October 2009:

Candidate	Portrait	Constituency and Office	AM Endorsements	MP Endorsements	Union Endorsements	CLP Endorsements
Edwina Hart		Gower Minister for Health and Social Services	Rosemary Butler, Christine Chapman, Jeff Cuthbert, Andrew Davies, Edwina Hart, Janice Gregory, Jane Hutt, Val Lloyd, Sandy Mewies, and Gwenda Thomas	Paul Murphy, Don Touhig and Martin Caton	Unite, CWU, Aslef, Community, Socialist Health Association, TSSA	Brecon and Radnorshire, Gower, Neath, Swansea East, Swansea West and Vale of Glamorgan
Carwyn Jones		Bridgend Counsel General for Wales	Leighton Andrews (Campaign Manager), Lorraine Barrett, Jane Davidson, Alun Davies, Brian Gibbons, John Griffiths, Lesley Griffiths, Carwyn Jones and Carl Sargeant	Nick Ainger, Kevin Brennan, Chris Bryant, Ann Clwyd, Paul Flynn, Hywel Francis, David Hanson, Huw Irranca-Davies, Ian Lucas, Madeleine Moon, Albert Owen, Chris Ruane, Mark Tami and Betty Williams	Unison, NUM (South Wales), Ucatt, Musicians' Union	Aberavon, Alyn and Deeside, Bridgend, Ogmore, Wrexham
Huw Lewis		Merthyr Tydfil and Rhymney Backbencher	Irene James, Ann Jones, Huw Lewis, Lynne Neagle, Karen Sinclair, Joyce Watson	Nia Griffith, Dai Havard, Sian James, Martyn Jones, Jessica Morden	Co-operative Party	Aberconwy, Clwyd West, Merthyr Tydfil and Rhymney, Torfaen

Derek Vaughan MEP supported Carwyn Jones.

== Results ==
Candidate	Affiliated members (33.3%)	Individual members (33.3%)	Elected members (33.3%)	Total
Carwyn Jones AM	51.3%	53.7%	50.9%	52.0%
Edwina Hart AM	33.9%	25.3%	28.3%	29.2%
Huw Lewis AM	14.8%	21.0%	20.8%	18.8%

== See also ==
- 2018 Welsh Labour deputy leadership election
