= 2018 Welsh Labour deputy leadership election =

Welsh Labour deputy leadership election

- 16 February – 21 April 2018
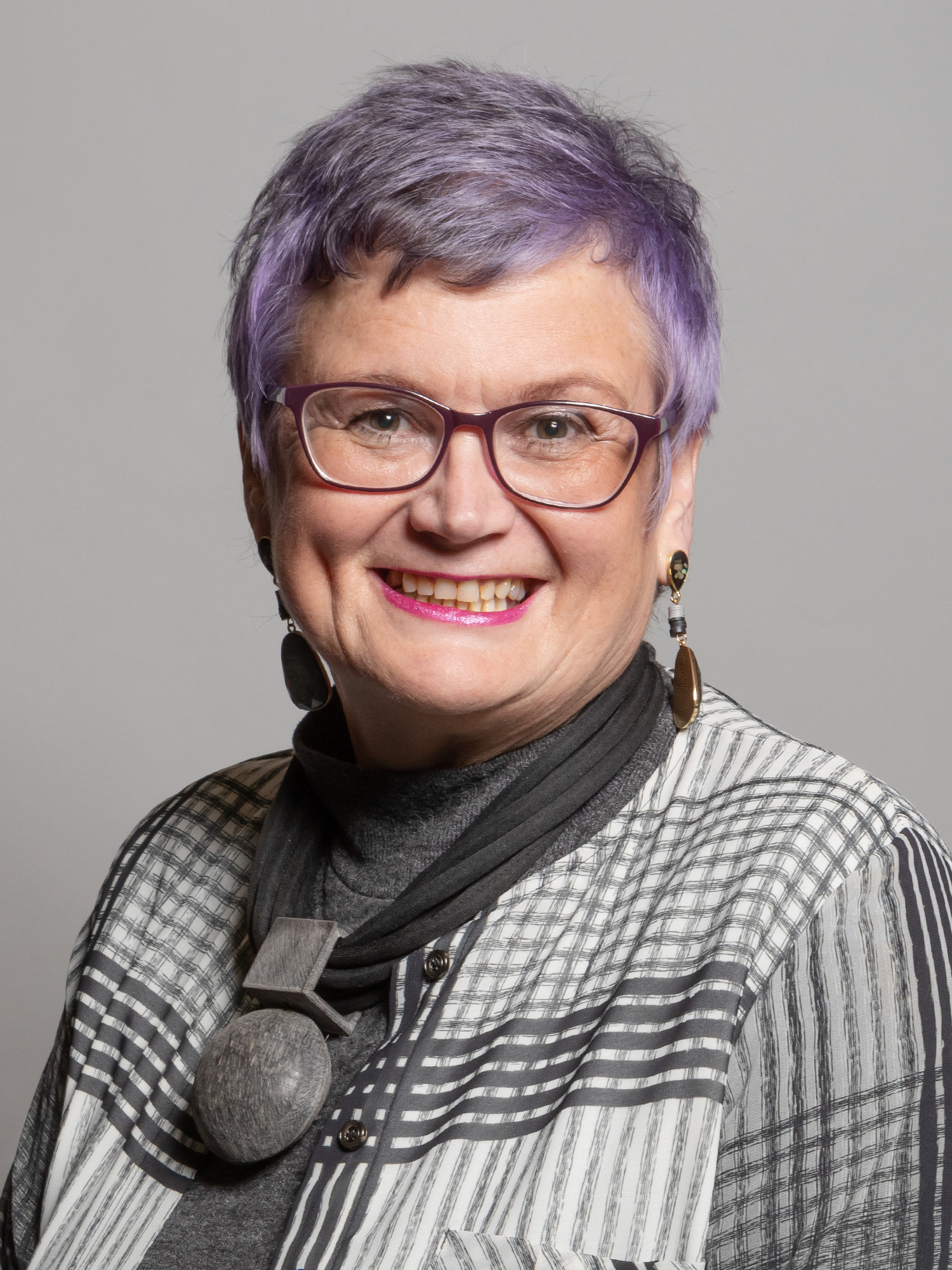

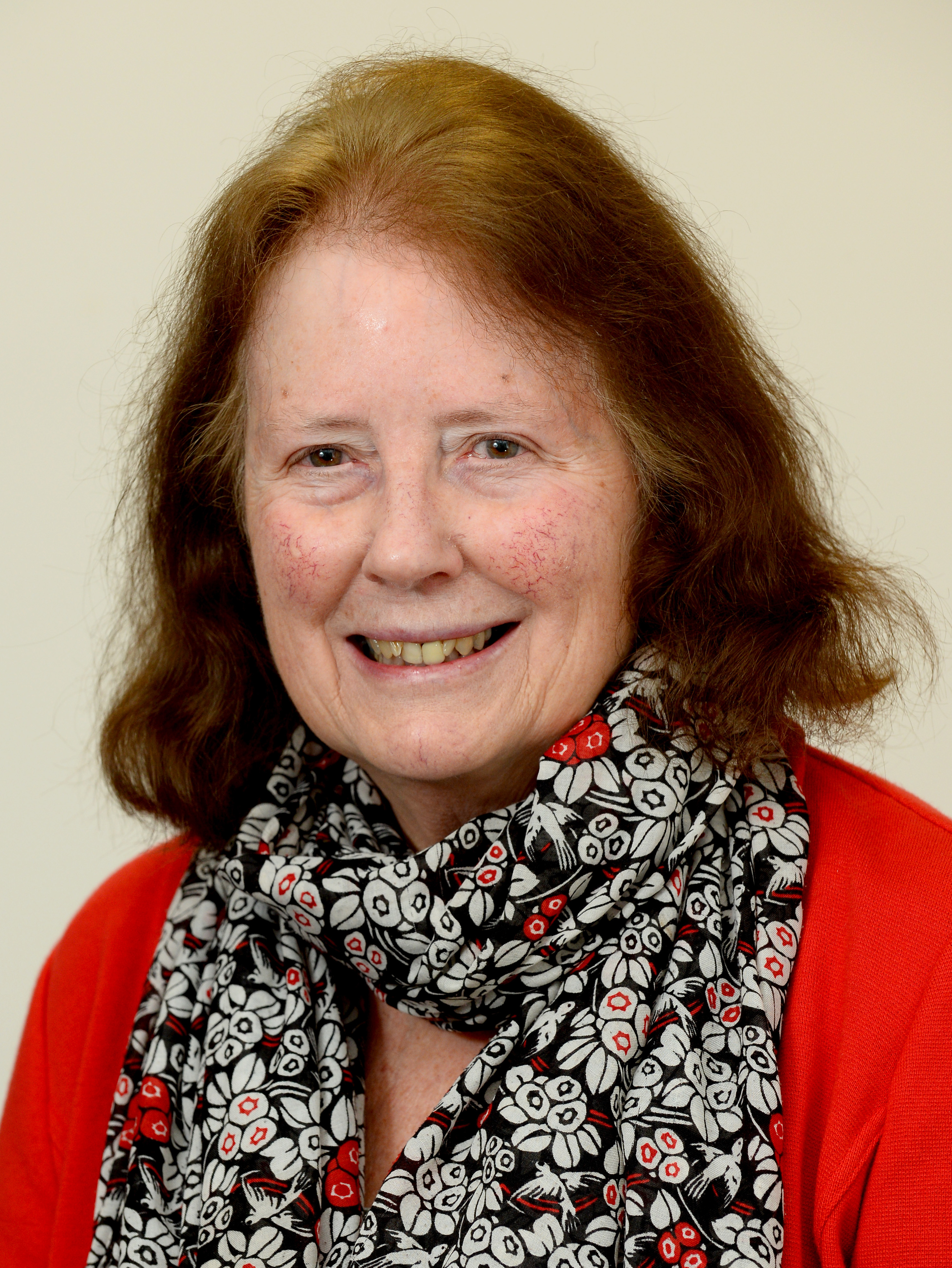
Candidate	Carolyn Harris	Julie Morgan
Overall result	51.5%	48.5%
Affiliated unions	60.4%	39.6%
Party members	34.8%	65.2%
MPs, AMs & MEPs	59.3%	40.7%
Deputy Leader before election
Position established
Elected Deputy Leader
Carolyn Harris

The 2018 Welsh Labour deputy leadership election took place from 16 February to 21 April 2018. It followed a review in the Welsh Labour Party which for the first time formalised the role of Deputy Leader. As the then leader Carwyn Jones was male, only women were eligible to stand for the role of deputy.

On 21 April 2018, Swansea MP Carolyn Harris was elected as Deputy Leader.

== Voting system ==
The election was conducted under an Electoral College system in which Labour Party members, affiliated trade union members and Welsh Labour elected officials all held an equal share of the votes.

Based on the turnout figures, Welsh Labour has approximately 25,000 individual members and 76,400 affiliated union members, as well as 58 elected officials (29 AMs, 28 MPs and 1 MEP).

== Candidates and endorsements ==
To stand, candidates needed the support of a minimum of 12 parliamentarians with a minimum of three AMs and three MPs.

Nominations closed at Midday on 16 February and two candidates – Swansea East MP Carolyn Harris, and Cardiff North AM Julie Morgan were successfully nominated.

Newport Council Leader Debbie Wilcox announced her candidacy but withdrew in favor of Julie Morgan.

The following were reported as endorsements at the close on nominations on 16 February 2018:

Candidate	Portrait	Constituency and office	AM endorsements	MP endorsements	Union endorsements	CLP endorsements
Carolyn Harris		Swansea East	Dawn Bowden, Hefin David, Alun Davies, Rebecca Evans, Vaughan Gething, Mike Hedges, Huw Irranca-Davies, Jeremy Miles, Eluned Morgan, Lynne Neagle and David Rees	Tonia Antoniazzi, Chris Bryant, Ann Clwyd, Wayne David, Stephen Doughty, Susan Elan Jones, Chris Elmore, David Hanson, Gerald Jones, Stephen Kinnock, Madeleine Moon and Albert Owen		
Julie Morgan		Cardiff North	Rhianon Passmore, Jenny Rathbone, Jack Sargent, Ken Skates, Lee Waters, Joyce Watson, John Griffiths, Lesley Griffiths, Jane Hutt, Mark Drakeford, Mick Antoniw, Hannah Blythyn and Jayne Bryant	Kevin Brennan, Geraint Davies, Paul Flynn, Nia Griffith and Anna McMorrin		

Derek Vaughan MEP supported Harris.

== Results and turnout ==
The results were announced at the Welsh Labour Conference in Llandudno on 21 April 2018. Harris was elected as Deputy Leader having won decisively amongst affiliated members and elected members, whilst Morgan won even more decisively amongst the votes of full party members by a 2:1 margin. Moreover, Morgan won 1,401 more votes than Harris if all three sets of results are aggregated. While Morgan won the popular vote 54%–46%, the overall result saw Harris win by 51.5%–48.5% in the electoral college.

The turnout among Parliamentarians was 93.1% (with 4 non voters), among full party members it was 38.3% and among affiliate members it was 4.7%, giving an overall turnout of 9.4%.

Candidate	Affiliated members (33.3%)		Labour Party members (33.3%)		MPs / AMs / MEPs (33.3%)		Overall result
Candidate	Votes	%	Votes	%	Votes	%	%
Carolyn Harris MP	4,341	60.4	3,336	34.8	32	59.3	51.5
Julie Morgan AM	2,844	39.6	6,244	65.2	22	40.7	48.5

== See also ==
- 2018 Welsh Labour leadership election
