= Julie Morgan =

Welsh Labour politician (born 1944)

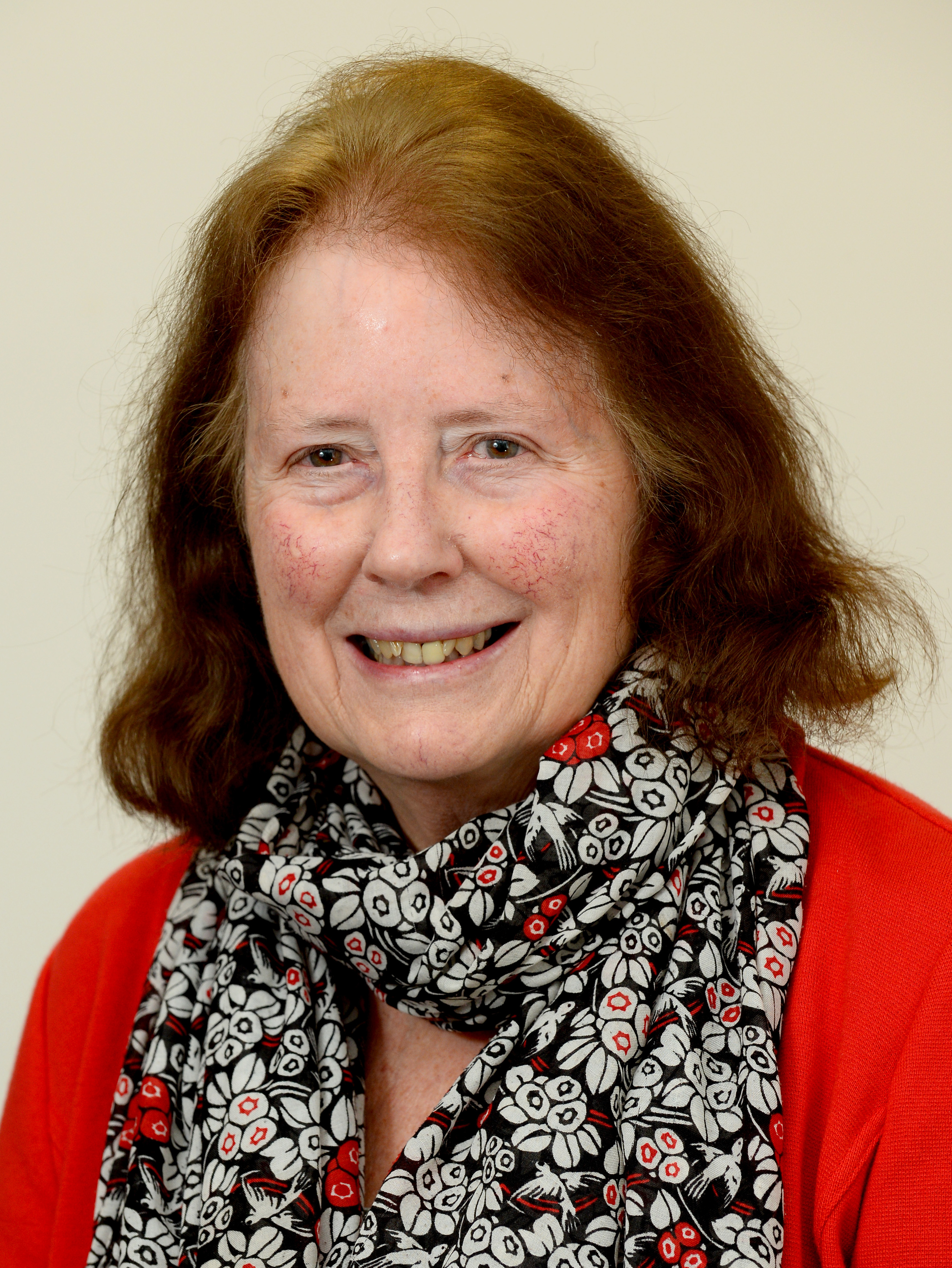
- Official portrait, 2019

Deputy Minister for Social Services
- In office 14 December 2018 – 20 March 2024
- First Minister: Mark Drakeford
- Preceded by: Huw Irranca-Davies
- Succeeded by: Dawn Bowden

Member of the Senedd for Cardiff North
- In office 5 May 2011 – 7 April 2026
- Preceded by: Jonathan Morgan
- Succeeded by: Seat abolished
- Majority: 6,593 (16.2%)

Member of Parliament for Cardiff North
- In office 1 May 1997 – 12 April 2010
- Preceded by: Gwilym Jones
- Succeeded by: Jonathan Evans

Personal details
- Born: Julie Edwards; 2 November 1944 (age 82) Cardiff, Glamorgan, Wales
- Party: Labour
- Spouse: Rhodri Morgan (m. 1967; died 2017)
- Children: 3
- Education: King's College London, Cardiff University

Julie Morgan (née Edwards; 2 November 1944) is a Welsh Labour Party politician, who was a Member of the Senedd for Cardiff North seat in the Senedd from the 2011 election until 2026. She was previously Member of Parliament (MP) for Cardiff North from 1997 until 2010.

She was married to former First Minister of Wales Rhodri Morgan until his death in 2017.

== Early life, education and career ==
Julie Edwards was born in Cardiff in 1944. She was educated at Dinas Powys Primary School and Howell's School Llandaff. She then attended King's College London where she graduated with a BA in English in 1965. Just as her first term at university was about to begin, a general election was called, and she returned to Cardiff to campaign for Jim Callaghan in the seat which was then Cardiff South East.

Despite Callaghan's protestations that she should go back to university, she campaigned for his victory alongside Neil Kinnock (the future leader of the Labour party), Glenys Kinnock and Rhodri Morgan, whom she would marry in 1967. Following her undergraduate degree, Morgan studied at the University of Manchester. She also holds a postgraduate diploma in Social Administration from University College, Cardiff.

Before becoming a Member of Parliament, Morgan was a social worker with Barry Social Services, and served as an assistant director of Barnardo's. She was elected as a local councillor to South Glamorgan County Council between 1985 and 1996, and was a Cardiff City Councillor from 1995.

== Member of Parliament (1997–2010) ==
Morgan was selected by Cardiff North Labour Party as their candidate for the 1992 general election. She stood against Gwilym Jones in the constituency, historically a Conservative stronghold. She achieved a 38.9% share of the vote to Jones' 45.1%, cutting his majority to 2,969.

Morgan was selected to stand for the seat once again in the 1997 election, though this time through an all-women shortlist. She took the seat with 24,460 votes—a 50.4% share and a majority of 8,126 on a marginally lower turnout than in 1992. She became the first woman to represent a Cardiff constituency and, at the time of her election, was one of only four women MPs from Wales. Morgan made her maiden speech in Parliament on 22 May 1997 in the debate on the Referendums (Scotland and Wales) Bill, designed to pave the way for devolution. She subsequently joined the Welsh Affairs Select committee, on which she served until 2005.

Morgan was re-elected at the 2001 general election with a reduced majority of 6,165 and on a substantially reduced turnout (in common with the rest of the country). At the 2005 election, her seat became the most marginal in Wales as her Conservative challenger reduced her majority to 1,146.

Commentators ascribed her victory to a strong personal vote, decisive in a campaign dominated by issues such as the Iraq War, criticism of Tony Blair and a leap in council tax caused by periodic revaluation of property values. Upon her re-election, she was appointed to the Constitutional Affairs and Public Administration Select Committees. Between 16 December 2009 and 12 March 2010, she steered the Sunbeds (Regulation) Bill (a private members' bill) through the House of Commons. The bill passed to the House of Lords for consideration.

In the 2010 election, Morgan polled 17,666 votes to Conservative Jonathan Evans' 17,860 votes, losing by 194 votes. Evans had previously been an MP between 1992 and 1997.

== Senedd ==
Morgan was elected to the seat of Cardiff North in the Senedd, in the 2011 election. She was re-elected in 2016, and again in 2021.

In 2016, she unsuccessfully stood for chair of the Senedd's Children, Young People and Education Committee.

Morgan stood for deputy leader in the 2018 Welsh Labour deputy leadership election, ultimately losing to Carolyn Harris despite winning more members' votes. Later that year, she supported Mark Drakeford in his leadership election. Following Drakeford's appointment as First Minister, she was appointed Deputy Minister for Health and Social Services in the Welsh Government.

Morgan stood down from the Senedd at the 2026 election.

== Views ==
During her second term, she opposed variable tuition fees for university students, citing fears that it would open up a market in higher education. She also opposed the war in Iraq and led a demonstration of "Labour Women Against War" in Cardiff city centre. Nevertheless, her voting record is supportive of the Labour Government, until it proposes a measure she cannot reconcile with her fundamental beliefs—such as the equal treatment of children, for instance in the asylum system, or in respect of protection from violence.

Morgan has been involved in the field of women's rights (having heavily promoted the introduction of all-women shortlists for political parties), as well as the welfare of children, black and minority ethnic and disabled people. She was one of the founders of the Purple Plaques scheme of public markers for remarkable women who lived in Wales. She is the chair of the All Party Parliamentary Group (APPG) on Children in Wales and is a member of numerous other APPGs, including those on Sex Equality and Compassion in Dying. Within the Parliamentary Labour Party, she is an active member of the Women's Group.

As her husband was, she is a Distinguished Supporter of Humanists UK. She supports lowering the voting age to 16 and to that end has presented a bill to Parliament.

Parliament of the United Kingdom
Preceded by Gwilym Jones	Member of Parliament for Cardiff North; 1997–2010	Succeeded by Jonathan Evans
Senedd
Preceded by Jonathan Morgan	Member of the Senedd for Cardiff North; 2011–2026	Succeeded by Seat abolished
