= All Wales Ethnic Minority Association =

The All Wales Ethnic Minority Association (AWEMA) was a Swansea, Wales-based charity, which was focused on national-level distribution of funds to various ethnic minority projects across Wales. It lost its charity status and funding in 2012 following repeated claims of mismanagement, investigated by the Welsh assembly.

== Operations ==
AWEMA, a company limited by guaranteed and registered charity, was governed by a Council of Members that were drawn from the five electoral regions of Wales. AWEMA's principal objective was to promote equality and diversity for the benefit of the Welsh public. This was achieved within four organisational objectives:

- Develop the capacity and skills of the multi ethnic communities of Wales so that they are better able to participate in society
- Advance education in equality and diversity by producing educational materials
- Raise awareness of all aspects of discrimination in society on the basis of race or ethnic minority status
- Promote racial harmony for the public benefit throughout Britain

AWEMA received £8.4m of public money in 2011, including the National Assembly for Wales, European Union and National Lottery funding. A lot of the charity’s work was around social inclusion, equality, diversity and employability as was discussed in detail in an equality and diversity report.

AWEMA was involved in a lot of charitable work with community groups over the years but lost its AWEMA in 2012 following some issues. However, the communities benefitted from the help and support the charity offered to individuals and groups in terms of employment skills, cv support, job interview coaching, english language support. Community celebrations of key festivals where celebrated and showcased for all with young people attending workshops for the likes of Visaki, Eid, Diwali, traditional kite making, learning how to cook different traditional foods from all over the world, learning to play musical instruments and more. Workshops were also held to support and help young people with poetry skills and AWEMA youth teams attended poetry slam competitions as a result. All this work was overseen by both the board and trustees.

=== Board ===
- Chair: Dr. Rita Austin
- CEO: Naz Malik
- Treasurer: Vacant
- Mid & West Wales: Sulakhan Singh Dale (Vice Chair)
- Mid & West Wales: Sajida Hussain
- South Wales East: Tarek Samad
- North Wales: Sha Siddiqi
- Co-Optee: Steve Lewis (Banking)
- Company Secretary: Sha Siddiqi

=== Trustees ===
- Mr. Sulakhan Singh Dale
- Mr R Davies
- Dr Sibani Roy
- Mr Naz Malik
- MR Stephen Robert Matthews
- DR George Karani
- MR. Naeem Amir
- MR. Sam Singh
- MRS. Zakia Ahmed
- MS Laurice Matthews

== Controversy of the Finance Director Saquib Zia ==
In 2004, Welsh Government Minister for Social Justice Edwina Hart commissioned an independent report on AWEMA's projects. The report stated no new projects should be funded until AWEMA demonstrated improved project and performance management, and that as a result AWEMA should be graded "high risk" by as a publicly funded institute. The conclusions stated:

After four years of operation and £325,000 of Welsh Assembly Government funding, the impact that AWEMA has had on the Welsh Assembly Government’s approach to BME [black and ethnic minority] communities in Wales has been somewhat limited.

On 2 July 2007, acting chairman Mr PK Verma and two other trustees resigned from the board of AWEMA, after being thwarted in an attempt to call a special board meeting. In a letter to the board and further correspondence to the Welsh Assembly, Mr Verma stated that there were concerns about the finance director Saquib Zia:

The remuneration of the director [Naz Malik], in particular the authorisation of salary and pension increases that had never been before the board, nor the management and supervision of the director. We have all come to the conclusion that it may be better to resign and leave the Assembly to sort out what is a most unsatisfactory situation.

A senior Welsh Assembly government official replied on 13 July 2007 to Mr Verma, stating that "these are essentially internal operational matters and ones for you and the board to resolve." As a result, the National Assembly of Wales (NAW) instigated a full report on AWEMA. On 26 January 2012 public funding was suspended by the NAW (holding £3M in funds), and the Big Lottery Fund. Under questioning from the NAW Public Accounts Committee (NAWPAC) on 31 January 2011, Welsh Permanent Secretary Dame Gillian Morgan said that the Welsh government was "concerned", and that as a result of the 2004 report AWEMA had not been graded "high risk". As a result of her evidence, NAWPAC chair Darren Millar stated that the police should investigate the allegations of financial corruption at AWEMA.

First Minister Carwyn Jones who stood on Welsh Labour's Mid and West Wales regional list for the National Assembly for Wales elections in 2011, the made a statement in the National Assembly to state that Welsh Labour and the National Assembly had "nothing to hide". Under pressure to make the 2004 report public, it emerged on 7 February 2012 that the report had been placed in the NAW library in 2004.

New Chair Dr Rita Austin defended AWEMA, posting of a 13-page report on AWEMA's website. In it she stated that AWEMA had become a "stick to beat the Welsh government", and that attacks on it were a "time honoured way of debasing and devaluing" black and ethnic minority people. Further, following questioning on BBC Wales politics programme Dragon's Eye on 2 February, Dr Austin demanded that BBC Wales immediately amend a headline it had been running on its website.

On 9 February 2012, NAG Finance Minister Jane Hutt announced that all Government funding to AWEMA had been terminated after a joint NAW/Big Lottery Fund investigation found "significant and fundamental failures", and a "fundamental lack of control". Hutt announced that the Wales Audit Office was to carry out a "thorough and independent review" of the history of funding to the charity. Additionally, on the same day, the Charity Commission said it has opened a statutory inquiry into "serious concerns" about AWEMA, while South Wales Police were considering the NAG/BLF report findings.

As a result the Finance Director Saquib Zia was dismissed following the allegations of mismanagement.
