= Jonathan Morgan (politician) =

British politician (born 1974)

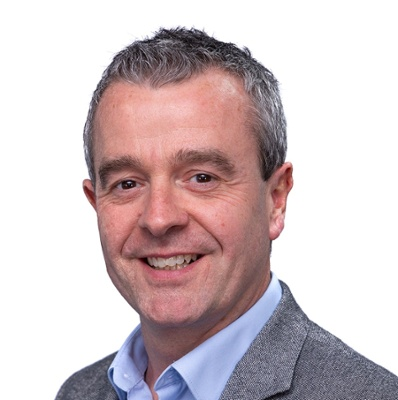
- Morgan in 2023

Shadow Minister for Local Government
- In office 26 November 2010 – 5 May 2011
- Leader: Nick Bourne
- Preceded by: Darren Millar
- Succeeded by: William Graham

Shadow Minister for Health and Social Services
- In office 7 July 2007 – 26 February 2009
- Leader: Nick Bourne
- Preceded by: Helen Mary Jones
- Succeeded by: Andrew RT Davies

Welsh Conservative Spokesperson
- 2003-2007: Health and Social Care Spokesperson
- 2000-2003: Culture Spokesperson
- 1999-2003: Education Spokesperson

Member of the Welsh Assembly for Cardiff North
- In office 3 May 2007 – 5 May 2011
- Preceded by: Sue Essex
- Succeeded by: Julie Morgan

Member of the Welsh Assembly for South Wales Central
- In office 6 May 1999 – 3 May 2007
- Preceded by: New Assembly
- Succeeded by: Andrew R. T. Davies

Personal details
- Born: 12 November 1974 (age 51) Tongwynlais, Cardiff, Wales
- Party: Conservative 1991 - 2023
- Spouse: Married
- Children: Two daughters
- Education: Cardiff University

Jonathan Morgan (born 12 November 1974) is a Welsh Conservative politician, who served as a Conservative Assembly Member (AM) for South Wales Central from 1999 to 2007 and AM for Cardiff North from 2007 to 2011. In the National Assembly elections in 2011 he was beaten by Labour's candidate Julie Morgan, wife of former First Minister Rhodri Morgan. He is currently chair of Cwm Taf Morgannwg University Health Board and Chairman of the Welsh NHS Confederation.

== Background ==
Born in Tongwynlais, Rural North Cardiff, Morgan is the grandson of Winston Griffiths, who stood down after many years as a councillor in Cardiff, while his mother and uncle were elected in 2004 to serve on the same local authority.

Educated at the Bishop of Llandaff Church in Wales High School, Cardiff. Morgan gained a Bachelor's degree in Law and Politics, and a MSc in European Policy from the University of Wales, Cardiff.

Before election to the Welsh Assembly, Morgan was European Officer for Coleg Glan Hafren. Morgan is a Fellow of the Royal Society of Arts. He has also been a Governor at two Cardiff Schools, and a Pupil Barrister, at 9 Park Place from September 2004.

He married his partner Emily in September 2006.

== Political career ==
In 1997 Morgan stood as the Conservative UK Parliament candidate for Merthyr Tydfil, at age 22.

In the 1999 and 2003 National Assembly for Wales elections, Morgan was elected as a regional list member for the South Wales Central constituency. He ran unsuccessfully for the Cardiff North constituency at both of these elections, but reduced the Labour majority to 540 votes in 2003. In 2007 he was successfully elected as the constituency member for Cardiff North, with a majority of 4,844 votes. He lost the seat at the next election to Welsh Labour's Julie Morgan, wife of former First Minister Rhodri Morgan. He also contested Cardiff North for the UK Parliament in the 2005 general election, but came second, again to Julie Morgan.

=== Pre-Assembly ===
Morgan was in favour of devolution and the creation of the Welsh assembly. He said to observer in August 1997 'What the Labour Party is talking about is administrative devolution, not power to legislate. The Conservative Party has backed that sort of devolution, so to oppose it now would make it easier for Labour to accuse us of hypocrisy. The talk of devolution destroying the union is just scare tactics.'

Morgan was the manager of Nick Bourne's campaign to be the first leader of the Welsh Conservatives. Bourne was not selected by the Welsh Conservatives, with Rod Richards being selected as the leader to contest the first assembly elections. He also chaired Conservative Future in Wales - the Welsh Youth Branch of the Conservative Party.

=== First Assembly ===
Morgan contested both the Cardiff North constituency, and the South Wales Central region. He was not elected in Cardiff North, receiving 9,894 votes to Sue Essex (Welsh Labour)'s 12,198. He was however elected on the regional list. Upon his election, Morgan was the youngest member of the First Assembly, at 24 years old.

Morgan served as the Welsh Conservative's Education Spokesperson during the first assembly term. His portfolio was expanded to also include culture, including broadcasting, media, and sport in November 2000. He also sat on the Assembly's European Affairs Committee.

In his role as Culture spokesperson he was critical of the handling of a bid for Cardiff to be European City of Culture in 2008, particularly of disagreements between Culture Minister Jenny Randerson and Cardiff Council leader Russell Goodway. He was supportive of the Construction of the new Wales Millennium Centre.

As Education spokesperson he campaigned for an end to GCSE-level Welsh Language learning being compulsory in Welsh Schools, and of efforts to prevent religious schools from set admissions quotas for their own religious community. He was also critical of the re-introduction of university tuition fees by the Blair government, and campaigned for and was supportive of their re-abolition in Wales, and of the Welsh Government's scrapping of league tables for school exam results. He further criticised the functioning and operation of Education and Learning Wales (ELWA), the quango responsible for large parts of Education in Wales at the time.

In February 2001 he was criticised by members of the Welsh Government for going on a skiing holiday in Salt Lake City to celebrate his engagement one week prior to the Assembly's half term recess. In the time he was not present, a number of matters pertaining to his portfolio were to be discussed, including the Wales Millennium Centre and discussions about broadcasting and television.

Morgan supported Ken Clarke in the 2001 Conservative Party leadership election.

=== Second Assembly ===
Morgan once again contested both Cardiff North and the South Wales Central list in the 2003 Welsh Assembly election. He was once again elected on the list, but reduced Sue Essex's majority in Cardiff North to 504 votes. He was appointed as the Welsh Tories Health and Social Services spokesperson, as well as being their business manager in the Assembly. He ceased being business manager within the first year of the term, saying that the Health brief was too significant to manage both roles.

In the Health role he was critical of issues with the Welsh NHS, including growing waiting lists. He opposed the introduction of free prescriptions, citing the cost of the policy. He was critical of proposals from the Welsh Government to introduce 24-hour alcohol licenses for pubs, due to risks of increased binge drinking, and general health risks.

Morgan also continued to be critical of the attitude of his party towards Wales, calling for his party to stop campaigning on the position of abolishing the Welsh Assembly - saying it would be perceived by the Welsh electorate as "a refusal to accept what they have decided."

In 2006 Jonathan was named Assembly Member of the Year in the ITV Wales/Wales Yearbook political awards. Judges said his work as health spokesman was "substantive, well thought-out and overwhelmingly constructive".

=== Third Assembly ===
Morgan did not contest the South Wales Central list at the 2007 Welsh Assembly elections, as running for both a constituency and a regional list had been banned by the Government of Wales Act 2006. He was elected as the AM for Cardiff North, with a majority of 4.844 votes, defeating Welsh Labour's Sophie Howe. The Welsh Conservatives became the second largest party on creation of the One Wales government, and as such formed the Shadow Cabinet. Morgan retained his previous portfolio, becoming Shadow Minister for Health and Social Services.

In 2008 Morgan became the first non-government AM to put forward a Legislative Competence Order (LCO) seeking powers for the Assembly over mental health. In 2009, he introduced the Mental Health Measure, reforming mental health law in Wales.

In February 2009, Morgan was not included in Nick Bourne's new Shadow Frontbench team, being replaced in the Health and Social Services role by Andrew RT Davies. He was reportedly offered the role of Shadow Education Minister, but turned it down. He was instead nominated as chairman of the Assembly audit committee. Bourne would later say that Morgan had been in the role "too long". Morgan was widely noted to be the primary candidate to succeed Bourne at this time.

As Chair of the Audit Committee, Morgan put forward proposals for reform to AM's expenses. The move was regarded as an attack on Nick Bourne's leadership, after Bourne had been revealed to claim, among other things, an IPod on assembly expenses.

Morgan also advocated for placing female Conservative candidates at the top of the party's regional list positions, as well as advocating for a devolved Welsh Conservative Party with its own leader. He also criticised that regional list AMs had to seek re-selection at every Assembly election, whereas constituency AMs did not.

In November 2010 he re-entered the Shadow Cabinet as Shadow Minister for Local Government, as well as the Chairmanship of the Welsh Assembly's health committee. Morgan's replacement as Shadow Health Minister Andrew RT Davies resigned shortly after.

Morgan lost his seat at the 2011 Welsh Assembly election to Julie Morgan, by 1,782 votes.

=== Post-Assembly ===
He backed Nick Ramsay to replace Nick Bourne after Bourne also lost his seat at the 2011 elections.

After losing his seat at the 2011 election, he established a consultancy business, consulting on how to influence the agenda of the Welsh Government. Later that year, he was employed by the Royal College of Nursing to lobby for the Adult Support and Protection (Wales) Bill.

In 2020, Morgan campaigned for selection as a Conservative candidate for the South Wales Central constituency in the 2021 Senedd Election, but was not shortlisted. This decision was controversial, with Conservative MS for the South Wales East constituency Laura Anne Jones saying she was 'shocked and sorry' he was not selected, and Monmouthshire councillor Richard John saying "Anyone without an agenda would agree he has earned a place on the ballot paper." Morgan said he was "bitterly disappointed" by his exclusion from the shortlist Journalist Martin Shipton and outgoing MS David Melding later alleged that this was because Morgan said he would vote to keep the Senedd, and not abolish it.

Morgan left the Conservative Party in 2023.

== Post-political career ==
Morgan was Head of the Association of Directors of Social Services Business Unit (2017–2020) and Chair of Hafod Housing Association (2020–2023). He also Chaired the Audit and Risk Assurance Committee of the Public Services Ombudsman from 2016 to 2020, and sat on the Audit Risk and Assurance Committee for the first Future Generations Commissioner for Wales between 2017 and 2023

In April 2023 Jonathan Morgan was appointed as Chair of Cwm Taf Morgannwg University Health Board for a period of 4 years. In 2024 he was appointed as Chair of the Welsh NHS Confederation, replacing Emma Woollett.

== Political views ==
=== Devolution ===
Morgan was a proponent of Welsh devolution during the 1997 Welsh devolution referendum campaign, though he was critical of the lack of legislative powers proposed for the new Assembly. During his time in the Senedd he near-consistently advocated for the devolution of further powers. However, he did oppose devolution of a few specific powers, including devolution of Housing, with regards to the right to buy council houses. He further opposed, and campaigned against the inclusion of a referendum on scrapping the Assembly within the Conservatives' position.

It has been widely alleged his exclusion from the Conservative party's South Wales Central shortlist was due to his support for devolution.

=== The Welsh Conservative Party ===
Morgan has supported greater autonomy for the Welsh Conservatives from the UK Conservative Party. He has also supported the creation of a much more distinctly Welsh identity for the party.

=== Europe ===
Morgan has been supportive of the UK playing a much more active role in European Integration. He urged conservative colleagues to not permanently rule out UK adoption of the Euro.

== Offices held ==
Senedd
Preceded by (new post)	Assembly Member for South Wales Central; 1999 – 2007	Succeeded by Andrew R. T. Davies
Preceded by Sue Essex	Assembly Member for Cardiff North; 2007–2011	Succeeded by Julie Morgan
Preceded by (new unofficial post)	Baby of the House; 1999–2003	Succeeded by Laura Anne Jones
Political offices
Preceded by Helen Mary Jones	Shadow Minister for Health and Social Services; 2007–2011	Succeeded by Darren Millar
