= Aberavon (Senedd constituency) =

Senedd constituency (1999–2026)

Coordinates: 51.600°N 3.812°W

Aberavon Aberafan
- Former Senedd constituency for the Senedd
- Aberavon shown as one of the 40; Senedd constituencies

Former Senedd constituency
- Created: 1999
- Abolished: 2026
- Party: Labour
- MS: David Rees
- Electoral region: South Wales West
- Preserved county: West Glamorgan

Aberavon (Welsh: Aberafan) was a constituency of the Senedd. It elected one Member of the Senedd by the first past the post method of election. Also, however, it was one of seven constituencies in the South Wales West electoral region, which elected four additional members, in addition to seven constituency members, to produce a degree of proportional representation for the region as a whole.

== History ==
Having only elected Labour MSs with huge majority this can be considered a Labour safe seat. Plaid Cymru are Labour's main opposition in the constituency and have been since its creation.

Party averages from 5 elections: Labour – 54.9, Plaid Cymru – 18.4, Conservative – 9.3, Lib Dem – 8.6,

UKIP stood for the first time in this constituency in the 2016 election and finished third with 15.0% of the vote.

== Boundaries ==
Map of 1999–2026 boundaries

The constituency was created for the first election to the Assembly, in 1999, with the name and boundaries of the Aberavon Westminster constituency prior to the 2023 review of Westminster constituencies, and it is entirely within the preserved county of West Glamorgan. Boundaries were unchanged by the review whose proposals come into effect for the 2007 Welsh Assembly election.

The constituency was composed of the Neath Port Talbot electoral divisions: Aberavon, Baglan, Briton Ferry East, Briton Ferry West, Bryn & Cwmavon, Coedffranc Central, Coedffranc North, Coedffranc West, Cymmer, Glyncorrwg, Gwynfi, Margam, Port Talbot, Sandlands East, Sandlands West, and Tai-bach.

The other six constituencies of the region were Bridgend, Gower, Neath, Ogmore, Swansea East and Swansea West.

== Voting ==
In general elections for the Senedd, each voter had two votes. The first vote was used to vote for a candidate to become the Member of the Senedd for the voter's constituency, elected by the first past the post system. The second vote was used to vote for a regional closed party list of candidates. Additional member seats were allocated from the lists by the d'Hondt method, with constituency results being taken into account in the allocation.

== Assembly members and members of the Senedd ==
| Election | Member | Party | Portrait |
|---|---|---|---|
| 1999 | Brian Gibbons | Labour | |
| 2011 | David Rees | Labour | |

== Elections ==
=== Elections in the 2020s ===
2021 Senedd election: Aberavon
| Party | Candidate | Constituency | | | Regional | | |
| Party | Candidate | Votes | % | ±% | Votes | % | ±% |
|---|---|---|---|---|---|---|---|
| Labour | David Rees | 10,505 | 47.4 | ―3.3 | 10,081 | 45.4 | ―0.5 |
| Plaid Cymru | Victoria Griffiths | 4,760 | 21.5 | +1.5 | 4,987 | 22.5 | +1.2 |
| Conservative | Liz Hill O'Shea | 2,947 | 13.3 | +6.9 | 3,141 | 14.1 | +7.9 |
| Independent | Scott Jones | 1,357 | 6.1 | New | | | |
| Liberal Democrats | Helen Ceri Clarke | 953 | 4.3 | ―1.7 | 670 | 3.0 | ―2.4 |
| Abolish | Sarah Allen | 646 | 2.9 | New | 789 | 3.6 | ±0.0 |
| Independent | Caroline Jones | | | | 519 | 2.3 | New |
| UKIP | Timothy Jenkins | 407 | 1.8 | ―13.2 | 395 | 1.8 | ―12.7 |
| Gwlad | Ceri Golding | 386 | 1.7 | New | 279 | 1.3 | New |
| Reform | Dennis May | 208 | 0.9 | New | 208 | 0.9 | New |
| Green | | | | | 659 | 3.0 | +1.2 |
| Propel | | | | | 195 | 0.9 | New |
| Freedom Alliance (UK) | | | | | 170 | 0.8 | New |
| Communist | | | | | 78 | 0.4 | +0.1 |
| TUSC | | | | | 42 | 0.2 | ―0.4 |
| Majority | | 5,745 | 25.9 | ―4.8 | | | |
| Turnout | | 22,688 | 42.3 | ―0.2 | | | |
| Labour hold | | Swing | | | | | |
Notes

Regional Ballot void votes: 150. Want of an Official Mark (0), Voting for more than ONE party or individual candidate (38), Writing or mark by which the Voter could be identified (1), Unmarked or Void for uncertainty (111)

=== Elections in the 2010s ===
Welsh Assembly Election 2016: Aberavon
| Party | Candidate | Constituency | | | Regional | | |
| Party | Candidate | Votes | % | ±% | Votes | % | ±% |
|---|---|---|---|---|---|---|---|
| Labour | David Rees | 10,578 | 50.7 | ―13.4 | 9,556 | 45.9 | ―11.3 |
| Plaid Cymru | Bethan Jenkins | 4,176 | 20.0 | +5.2 | 4,446 | 21.3 | +8.5 |
| UKIP | Glenda Davies | 3,119 | 15.0 | New | 3,019 | 14.5 | +10.6 |
| Conservative | David Jenkins | 1,342 | 6.4 | ―7.9 | 1,298 | 6.2 | ―4.7 |
| Liberal Democrats | Helen Ceri Clarke | 1,248 | 6.0 | ―0.8 | 1,128 | 5.4 | +0.8 |
| Green | Jonathan Tier | 389 | 1.9 | New | 370 | 1.8 | ±0.0 |
| Abolish | | | | | 742 | 3.6 | New |
| TUSC | | | | | 115 | 0.6 | +0.3 |
| Monster Raving Loony | | | | | 111 | 0.5 | New |
| Communist | | | | | 54 | 0.3 | ±0.0 |
| Majority | | 6,402 | 30.7 | ―18.6 | | | |
| Turnout | | 20,852 | 42.5 | +5.5 | | | |
| Labour hold | | Swing | ―9.3 | | | | |

Welsh Assembly Election 2011: Aberavon
| Party | Candidate | Constituency | | | Regional | | |
| Party | Candidate | Votes | % | ±% | Votes | % | ±% |
|---|---|---|---|---|---|---|---|
| Labour | David Rees | 12,104 | 64.1 | +14.8 | 10,671 | 57.2 | |
| Plaid Cymru | Paul Nicholls-Jones | 2,793 | 14.8 | −2.5 | 2,391 | 12.8 | |
| Conservative | T. Morgan | 2,704 | 14.3 | +4.6 | 2,030 | 10.9 | |
| Liberal Democrats | Helen Ceri Clarke | 1,278 | 6.8 | −0.3 | 860 | 4.6 | |
| BNP | | | | | 627 | 3.4 | |
| UKIP | | | | | 719 | 3.9 | |
| Socialist Labour | | | | | 669 | 3.6 | |
| Green | | | | | 340 | 1.8 | |
| Welsh Christian | | | | | 174 | 0.9 | New |
| TUSC | | | | | 113 | 0.6 | New |
| Communist | | | | | 61 | 0.3 | |
| Majority | | 9,311 | 49.3 | +17.3 | | | |
| Turnout | | 18,879 | 37.0 | −2.8 | | | |
| Labour hold | | Swing | +8.7 | | | | |

Regional ballots rejected at the count: 134

=== Elections in the 2000s ===
Welsh Assembly Election 2007: Aberavon
| Party | Candidate | Constituency | | | Regional | | |
| Party | Candidate | Votes | % | ±% | Votes | % | ±% |
|---|---|---|---|---|---|---|---|
| Labour | Brian Gibbons (Note: Incumbent member for this constituency) | 10,129 | 49.3 | −10.1 | 9,303 | | |
| Plaid Cymru | Linett Purcell | 3,558 | 17.3 | −0.4 | 3,610 | | |
| Independent | Andrew Tutton | 2,561 | 12.5 | New | | | |
| Conservative | Daisy Meyland-Smith | 1,990 | 9.7 | +0.5 | 2,058 | | |
| Liberal Democrats | Claire Waller | 1,450 | 7.1 | −2.7 | 1,775 | | |
| New Millennium Bean Party | Captain Beany | 840 | 4.1 | New | | | |
| BNP | | | | | 1,185 | | New |
| Green | | | | | 663 | | |
| UKIP | | | | | 653 | | |
| Socialist Labour | | | | | 423 | 0. | New |
| Welsh Christian | | | | | 230 | | New |
| Socialist Alternative (UK) | | | | | 196 | | New |
| Keith James - Independent | | | | | 146 | | New |
| Respect | | | | | 73 | 0. | New |
| Communist | | | | | 66 | 0. | New |
| CPA | | | | | 37 | 0. | New |
| Joel Jenkins - Independent | | | | | 26 | | New |
| Majority | | 6,571 | 32.0 | −9.7 | | | |
| Turnout | | 20,528 | 39.8 | +2.1 | | | |
| Labour hold | | Swing | −11.3 | | | | |

Welsh Assembly Election 2003: Aberavon
| Party | Candidate | Constituency | | | Regional | | |
| Party | Candidate | Votes | % | ±% | Votes | % | ±% |
|---|---|---|---|---|---|---|---|
| Labour | Brian Gibbons | 11,137 | 59.4 | +8.1 | 9,769 | | |
| Plaid Cymru | Geraint D. Owen | 3,324 | 17.7 | −4.6 | 3,242 | | |
| Liberal Democrats | Claire Waller | 1,840 | 9.8 | −3.8 | 1,934 | | |
| Conservative | Myr A. Boult | 1,732 | 9.2 | +2.2 | 1,599 | | |
| Independent | Robert Williams | 608 | 3.2 | New | | | |
| Independent | Gwenno M. Saunders | 114 | 0.6 | New | | | |
| Green | | | | | 678 | | |
| Socialist Labour | | | | | 572 | | |
| UKIP | | | | | 509 | | |
| Cymru Annibynnol | | | | | 217 | | |
| ProLife Alliance | | | | | 58 | 0. | |
| Majority | | 7,813 | 41.7 | +12.7 | | | |
| Turnout | | 18,755 | 37.7 | −9.2 | | | |
| Labour hold | | Swing | +6.4 | | | | |

2003 Electorate: 50,208
Regional ballots rejected: 348

=== Elections in the 1990s ===
Welsh Assembly Election 1999: Aberavon
| Party | Candidate | Votes | % | ±% |
|---|---|---|---|---|
| Labour | Brian Gibbons | 11,941 | 51.3 | N/A |
| Plaid Cymru | Janet Davies | 5,198 | 22.3 | N/A |
| Liberal Democrats | Keith Davies | 3,165 | 13.6 | N/A |
| Conservative | Mary E. Davies | 1,624 | 7.0 | N/A |
| Independent | Captain Beany | 849 | 3.6 | N/A |
| Independent | David Pudner | 517 | 2.2 | N/A |
| Majority | | 6,743 | 29.0 | N/A |
| Turnout | | 23,294 | 46.9 | N/A |
| Labour win (new seat) | | | | |

== See also ==
- Politics of Wales
