= Edwina Hart =

British politician (born 1957)

Edwina Hart MBE
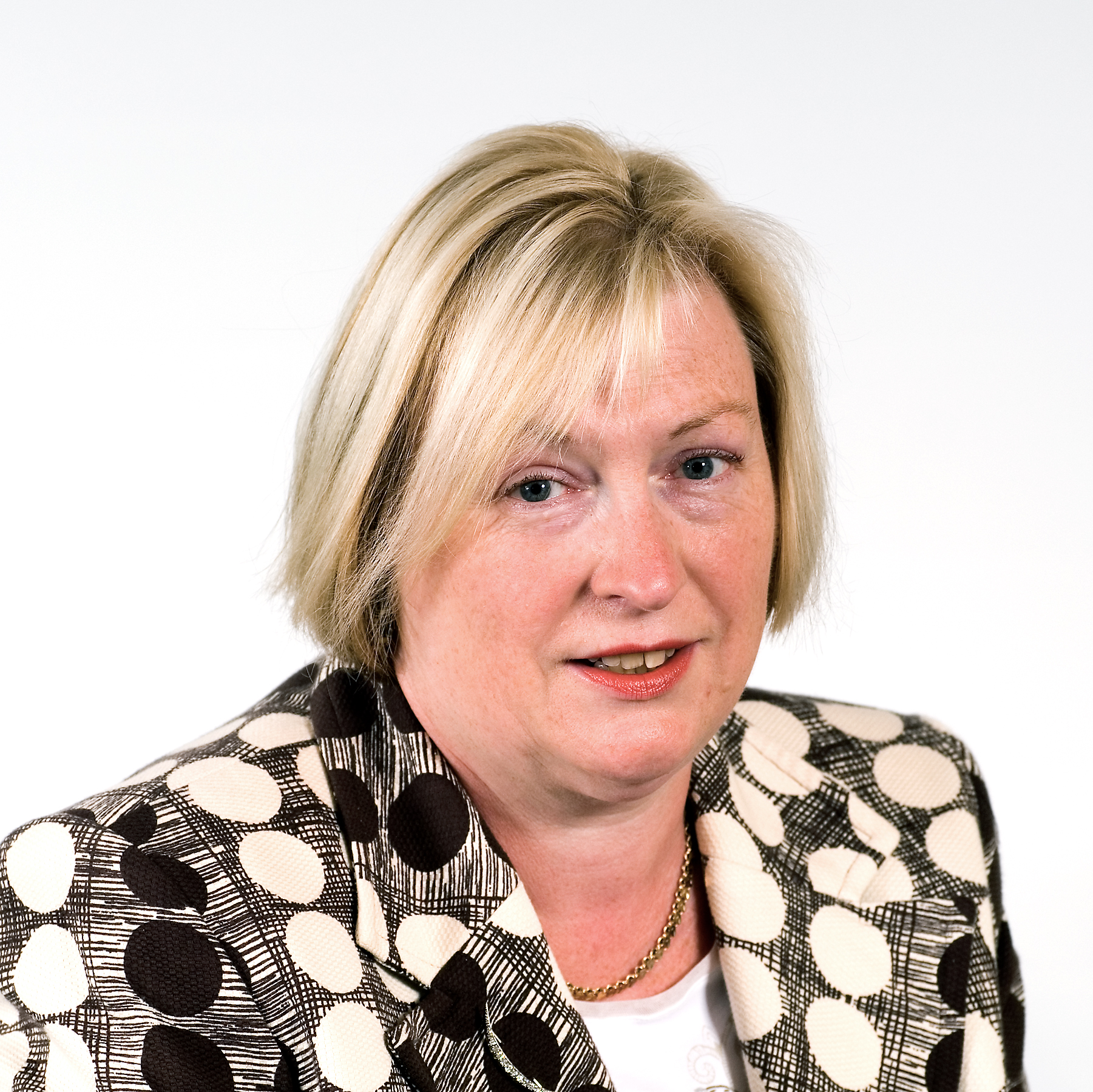

Minister for Business, Enterprise, Technology and Science
- In office 13 May 2011 – 19 May 2016
- First Minister: Carwyn Jones
- Preceded by: Ieuan Wyn Jones
- Succeeded by: Ken Skates

Minister for Health and Social Services
- In office 4 May 2007 – 13 May 2011
- First Minister: Rhodri Morgan; Carwyn Jones
- Preceded by: Brian Gibbons
- Succeeded by: Lesley Griffiths

Minister for Local Government and Regeneration
- In office 17 June 2000 – 1 May 2003
- First Minister: Rhodri Morgan
- Preceded by: Peter Law
- Succeeded by: Sue Essex

Member of the Welsh Assembly for Gower
- In office 6 May 1999 – 6 April 2016
- Preceded by: New Assembly
- Succeeded by: Rebecca Evans
- Majority: 4,864 (18.2%)

Personal details
- Born: 26 April 1957 (age 69) Gowerton, Wales
- Party: Welsh Labour
- Spouse: Bob Hart
- Children: 1 daughter

Edwina Hart, MBE (born 26 April 1957) is a Welsh Labour politician who represented the constituency of Gower from the establishment of the National Assembly for Wales (Senedd) in 1999 until 2016. Hart served in the Welsh Government as a cabinet minister for the full 17 years she was an AM including as Minister for Health and Social Services from 2007 to 2011 and as Minister for Business, Enterprise, Technology and Science from 2011 to 2016.

She was the runner up to Carwyn Jones in the 2009 Welsh Labour leadership election.

== Background ==
Hart was born and raised in Gowerton, Swansea, where she attended Gowerton Girls' Grammar School. She especially enjoyed English and Music and became a member of the National Youth Orchestra of Wales. Today Edwina lives in Gowerton with her family; she has one daughter.

== Professional career ==
Hart has worked in banking, where she became active in the trade union movement. As a result of this work she was elected as the first female president of the Banking, Insurance and Finance Union, serving from 1992 to 1994. She also served as chair of the Wales TUC (as did her husband, Bob Hart, in another year). Hart later received an MBE for Trade Union services. In 1998 Edwina also served as a member of the Broadcasting Council for Wales and sat on the board of the Wales Millennium Centre. She also sat on the Employment Appeals Tribunal, was a member of the South West Wales Economic Forum and a director of Chwarae Teg. Edwina is a member of T&GWU and Community as well as a life member of Amicus.

== Political career ==
Hart was elected to the First Assembly with 35.4% of the vote in 1999 for the constituency of Gower. She became the Assembly's first Finance Secretary. In 2000, this was changed to include responsibility for local government and she became Minister for Finance and Local Government.

She was re-elected to the Second Assembly in 2003, increasing her majority to 5688 (+8.2%) with 43.60% of the vote. After the election she took on the newly created Social Justice portfolio and became the Assembly's first ever Minister for Social Justice and Regeneration Minister, whose responsibilities include community safety, youth justice, police relations, fire service, alcohol and drug abuse, social economy, anti-poverty, housing, social housing, the voluntary sector, issues relating to asylum and immigration, liaison for armed forces in Wales, veterans, regeneration of communities, and development.

In 2004, in her role as Minister for Social Justice, Hart commissioned an independent report on charity All Wales Ethnic Minority Association's projects. The report stated no new projects should be funded until AWEMA demonstrated improved project and performance management, and that as a result AWEMA should be graded "high risk" by as a publicly funded institute.

She was once again re-elected to the Third Assembly in May 2007 with a reduced majority of 1192 (34.2% of the vote) and was appointed Minister for Health and Social Services (31 May 2007). She retained this position when the coalition government of Labour and Plaid Cymru was announced on 19 July.

In October 2009, Hart announced that she would stand for leadership of the Labour party in Wales after Rhodri Morgan's retirement, on a commitment to carry on the "Clear Red Water" of Rhodri Morgan. Whilst she secured backing from a number of Unions and prominent figures such as Finance Minister Andrew Davies, Hart finished second in the Leadership contest. She retained her position as Minister for Health in the cabinet appointed by First Minister Carwyn Jones.

Hart controversially ruled out a review of NHS spending in Wales on 12 November 2009, declining Liberal Democrat Kirsty Williams request to review how £1 billion has been spent on NHS services, following evidence to the Welsh Assembly's Finance Committee that claimed £1 billion was 'wasted' in the Welsh NHS each year.

In September 2010, Hart was accused by Welsh Liberal Democrats of withholding a consultants' report that criticised the leadership of the NHS by the Welsh Government.

Hart retired at the 2016 election and was succeeded by fellow Labour AM Rebecca Evans.

== Offices held ==
Senedd
| New post | Assembly Member for Gower; 1999–2016 | Succeeded by Rebecca Evans |
Political offices
| New post | Minister for Finance; 1999–2000 | post abolished |
| New post | Minister for Finance and Local Government; 2000–2003 | Succeeded by Sue Essex |
| New post | Minister for Social Justice and Regeneration; 2003–2007 | Succeeded by Andrew Davies |
| Preceded by Brian Gibbons | Minister for Health and Social Services; 2007–2011 | Succeeded by Lesley Griffiths |
| Preceded by Ieuan Wyn Jones | Minister for Business, Enterprise, Technology and Science; 2011–2016 | Succeeded by Ken Skates |
Trade union offices
| Preceded by David White | President of the Wales TUC; 1997–1998 | Succeeded by Denise Carter |
