= Brian Gibbons (politician) =

Irish-born Welsh politician

Brian Gibbons FRCGP
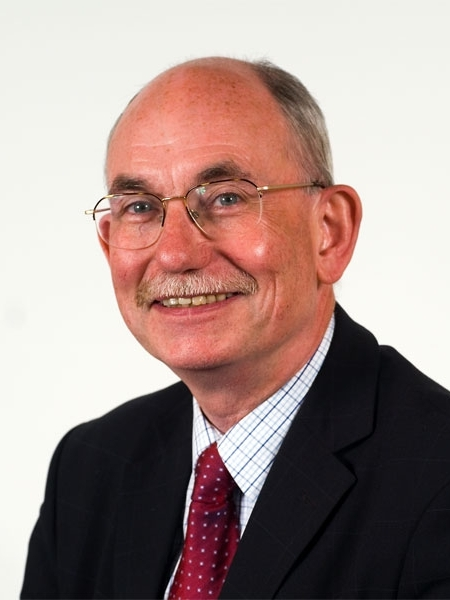
- Official portrait, 2007

Member of the Welsh Assembly for Aberavon
- In office 6 May 1999 – 5 May 2011
- Preceded by: New Assembly
- Succeeded by: David Rees
- Majority: 6,571 (32.0%)

Personal details
- Born: 25 August 1950 (age 76) Dublin, Ireland
- Party: Labour

Brian Gibbons FRCGP (born 25 August 1950) is a Welsh medical doctor and former politician. He was the Labour Party Assembly Member for Aberavon from May 1999 to May 2011. He served in the Welsh Government as Minister for Health and Social Services from 2005 to 2007, Minister for the Economy and Transport in 2007, and Minister for Social Justice and Local Government from 2007 to 2009.

== Background ==
Born in Dublin, a son of the former Irish Fianna Fáil politician, Hugh Gibbons, he was raised in County Roscommon Ireland, and moved to Yorkshire in 1976 to train as a general medical practitioner in Calderdale. He subsequently became a GP in Blaengwynfi and also worked as a GP in partnership with Julian Tudor Hart at Glyncorrwg in the Afan Valley near Port Talbot.

A member of the British Medical Association (BMA), the Socialist Health Association, and the Medical Practitioners Union (UNITE), he is a fellow of the Royal College of General Practitioners, and a former Secretary to the Morgannwg Local Medical Committee.

== Political career ==
In April 1999, Gibbons was selected as the Labour party candidate for the Aberavon constituency in the new National Assembly for Wales. He was elected in the first Welsh Assembly elections in May, with a majority of 6,743. In October 2000, he was appointed as Deputy Minister for Health by First Minister Rhodri Morgan, providing support to Health Minister Jane Hutt.

He was re-elected in 2003, and appointed as Deputy Minister for Economic Transport and Development shortly after. In August 2003, Gibbons, alongside labour colleague John Griffiths, wrote a submission to the Richard Commission supporting further powers for the Welsh Assembly.

In January 2005, Gibbons was appointed as Minister for Health after prior Health Minister Jane Hutt was removed from the role. After being appointed he was given "free rein" over the government's policy on health. Gibbons announced he would begin a period of consultation, to determine the best course of action. He faced pressure to adopt similar systems to those used for the English health service, particularly from Wales Secretary Peter Hain, and in March 2005 adopted a target for treatment waiting times of no waits longer than six months by 2009. He was responsible for bringing in the ban on smoking in enclosed places in Wales on 2/4/2007 and free prescriptions from April 2007.

In the first Cabinet of the Third Assembly he was appointed Minister for the Economy and Transport in May 2007, and Minister for Social Justice and Local Government in the coalition government in July 2007. In 2008 he published the Welsh Refugee Inclusion Strategy In 2009, he announced he would stand down at the 2011 Welsh Assembly election, and stand down from the Cabinet. He was succeeded as AM for Aberavon by David Rees, also of the Labour Party. He stated he intended to return to medicine and retrained with Dr Martin Collison, Gorseinon. He retired from medicine in 2015 but returned to the Medical Register during the Covid Pandemic in 2020.

== Offices held ==
Senedd
New office	Assembly Member for Aberavon; 1999–2011	Succeeded by David Rees
Political offices
New office	Deputy Minister for Health and Social Services; 2000–2003	Succeeded by John Griffiths
Preceded by Alun Pugh	Deputy Minister for Economic Development; 2003–2005	Succeeded by Tamsin Dunwoody
Preceded by Jane Hutt	Minister for Health and Social Services; 2005–2007	Succeeded by Edwina Hart
Preceded by Andrew Davies	Minister for the Economy and Transport; 2007 (31 May – 19 July)	Succeeded by Ieuan Wyn Jones
New office	Minister for Social Justice and Local Government; 2007–2009	Succeeded by Carl Sargeant
