= David Rees (politician) =

Welsh politician (born 1957)

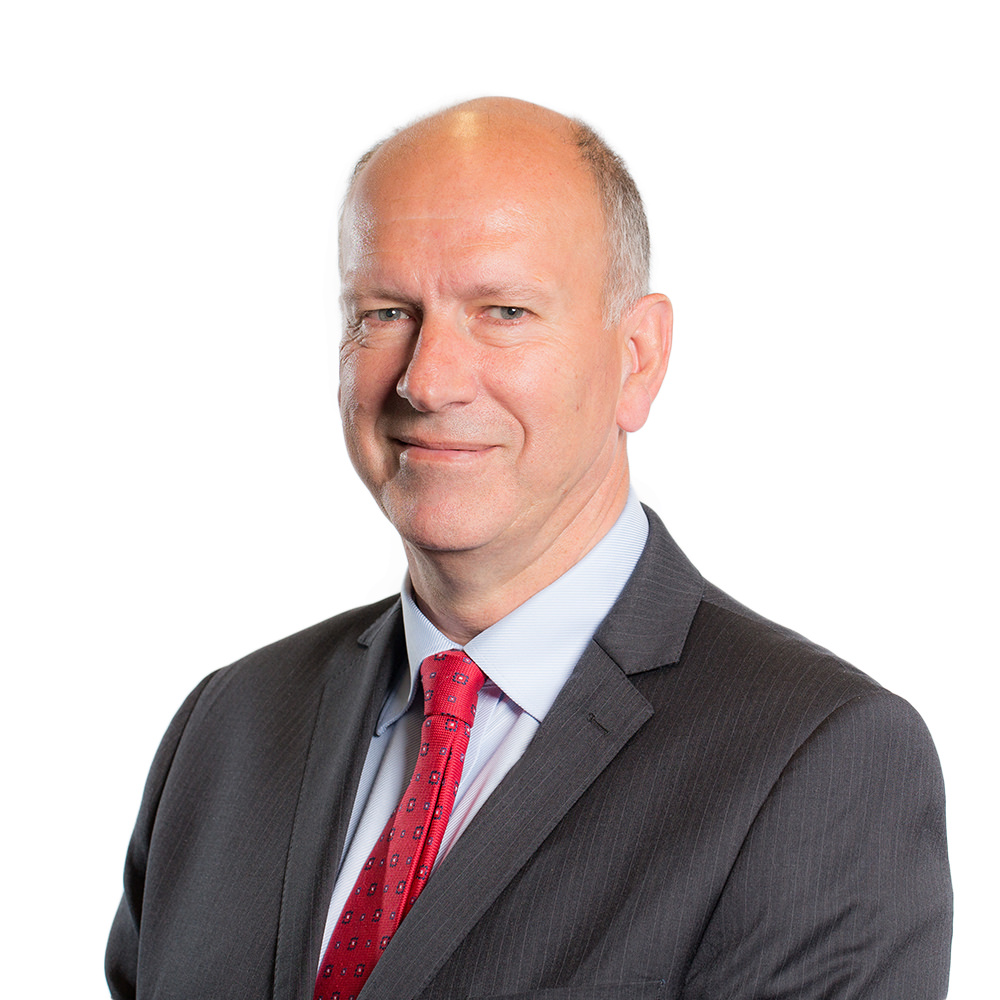
- Rees in 2016

Deputy Presiding Officer (Dirprwy Lywydd) of the Senedd
- In office 12 May 2021 – 8 April 2026
- Preceded by: Ann Jones
- Succeeded by: Kerry Ferguson

Member of the Senedd for Aberavon
- In office 5 May 2011 – 7 April 2026
- Preceded by: Brian Gibbons
- Succeeded by: Constituency abolished

Personal details
- Born: 17 January 1957 (age 69) Port Talbot, Wales
- Party: Welsh Labour
- Spouse: Marie Rees
- Children: 2
- Education: Cardiff University
- Occupation: Lecturer
- Profession: Politician
- Website: www.davidrees.wales

David Rees is a Welsh Labour politician who served as the Deputy Presiding Officer of the Senedd from 2021 until 2026. He served as the Member of the Senedd (MS) for Aberavon from 2011 until 2026.

== Early life ==
David studied at Cardiff University, where he obtained an honours degree in Engineering and a postgraduate teaching qualification. He then began a career in education, working at Cynffig Comprehensive School in Kenfig Hill, and then at Afan College. He then moved into a career in Higher Education, eventually becoming Assistant Dean of Faculty at Swansea Metropolitan University. While working in Higher education he also obtained a Master's degree.

== Political career ==
Rees joined the Labour Party in 1982 and has been an active member ever since. He has held several positions within the Labour Party and was the Constituency Labour Party secretary for Aberavon between 2005 and 2011.

Before being selected as the Welsh Labour candidate for Aberavon, Rees stood as the Labour candidate in the 2003 Assembly Elections in the constituency of Brecon and Radnorshire, coming third, and in the 2007 election for the South Wales West region, where Labour earned no regional top-up seats, meaning he was not elected.

He is a member of both Unite and Unison trade unions. Throughout his working life he has been a strong advocate for good working relationships with the trade unions and regularly raises trade union issues in the Senedd.

Rees is currently chair of the Committee for the Scrutiny of the First Minister, the Llywydd's Committee and the Reform Bill committee. He has previously chaired the External Affairs and Additional Legislation Committee and the Health and Social Care Committee.

He also sits on the Committee for the Scrutiny of the First Minister and the Senedd's Chairs Forum, and has previously sat on the Health, Social Care and Sport Committee, considering issues across the health, mental health, social care and well-being portfolios, and, In the fifth assembly he also sat on the finance committee.

Through his role as the Chair of the Cross Party Group on Steel, he is actively involved in campaigns to strengthen our steel sector to make it a sustainable industry for the future. Rees acts as the Chair of the Cross Party Group on STEMM and he strongly advocates the position Science and Technology can play in economic policy. He chairs the Cross Party Group on Cancer, and is a member of the groups on Animal Welfare, and Stroke.

His other interests include strengthen local communities, child poverty, youth engagement, regeneration and education.

In the 2026 Senedd election, he stood for Afan Ogwr Rhondda constituency but was not elected. He was third on the party list behind Huw Irranca-Davies and Buffy Williams.

Senedd
Preceded by Brian Gibbons	Member of the Senedd for Aberavon; 2011 – 2026	Succeeded by seat abolished
