= Gower (Senedd constituency) =

Senedd constituency (1999–2026)

Coordinates: 51.620°N 4.137°W

Gower Gŵyr
- Former Senedd county constituency for the Senedd
- Gower shown as one of the 40; Senedd constituencies

Former Senedd county constituency
- Created: 1999
- Abolished: 2026
- Party: Labour
- MS: Rebecca Evans
- Electoral region: South Wales West
- Preserved county: West Glamorgan

Gower (Welsh: Gŵyr) was a constituency of the Senedd. It elected one Member of the Senedd by the first past the post method of election. It was also one of seven constituencies in the South Wales West electoral region, which elected four additional members, in addition to seven constituency members, to produce a degree of proportional representation for the region as a whole.

== History ==
The constituency had elected a Labour member since the assembly was created in 1999. However in 2007 and 2016 the party won narrow majorities. The AM from 1999 to 2016 Edwina Hart was Minister for Business, Enterprise, Technology and Science from 2011 to 2016.

== Boundaries ==
Map of 1999–2026 boundaries

The constituency was created for the first election to the Assembly, in 1999, with the name and boundaries of the Gower Westminster constituency. It was entirely within the preserved county of West Glamorgan.

The other six constituencies of the region were Aberavon, Bridgend, Neath, Ogmore, Swansea East and Swansea West.

== Voting ==
In general elections for the Senedd, each voter had two votes. The first vote was used to vote for a candidate to become the Member of the Senedd for the voter's constituency, elected by the first past the post system. The second vote was used to vote for a regional closed party list of candidates. Additional member seats were allocated from the lists by the d'Hondt method, with constituency results being taken into account in the allocation.

== Members of the Senedd ==
Election	Member	Party	Portrait
1999	Edwina Hart	Labour	
2016	Rebecca Evans	Labour	

== Elections ==
=== Elections in the 2020s ===
2021 Senedd election: Gower
Party	Candidate	Constituency			Regional		
Party	Candidate	Votes	%	±%	Votes	%	±%
Labour	Rebecca Evans (Note: Incumbent member for this constituency)	15,631	47.1	+7.4	13,401	40.4	+6.2
Conservative	Myles Langstone	10,836	32.7	-0.9	9,380	28.3	+1.1
Plaid Cymru	John Davies	3,946	11.9	+2.0	5,079	15.3	+1.9
Green	Anne Leonie Pigott	1,088	3.3	+0.9	1,501	4.5	+1.9
Liberal Democrats	Michael John Sheehan	869	2.6	-0.8	950	2.9	-2.9
Reform	Byron John	547	1.6	New	275	0.8	New
Gwlad	Wayne Erasmus	247	0.7	New	159	0.5	New
Abolish					1,337	4.0	-1.3
UKIP					412	1.2	-9.2
Independent	Caroline Jones				241	0.7	N/A
Freedom Alliance (UK)					206	0.6	New
Propel					137	0.4	New
Communist					55	0.2	0.0
TUSC					47	0.1	-0.2
Majority		4,795	14.4	+8.3			
Turnout		33,164	52.66	+2.9			
Labour hold		Swing					
Notes

Regional Ballot void votes: 182. Want of an Official Mark (0), Voting for more than ONE party or individual candidate (48), Writing or mark by which the Voter could be identified (1), Unmarked or Void for uncertainty (133)

=== Elections in the 2010s ===
Welsh Assembly Election 2016: Gower
Party	Candidate	Constituency			Regional		
Party	Candidate	Votes	%	±%	Votes	%	±%
Labour	Rebecca Evans	11,982	39.7	-8.4	10,310	34.2	-4.0
Conservative	Lyndon Jones	10,153	33.6	+3.7	8,220	27.2	-0.7
UKIP	Colin Beckett	3,300	10.9	New	3,128	10.4	-6.1
Plaid Cymru	Harri Roberts	2,982	9.9	-2.2	4,044	13.4	+0.8
Liberal Democrats	Sheila Kingston-Jones	1,033	3.4	-6.5	1,738	5.8	-1.8
Green	Abi Cherry-Hamer	737	2.4	New	799	2.6	-0.6
Abolish					1,609	5.3	New
Monster Raving Loony					189	0.6	New
TUSC					82	0.3	-0.2
Communist					71	0.2	±0.0
Majority		1,829	6.1	−12.1			
Turnout		30,187	49.8	+6.7			
Labour hold		Swing					

Welsh Assembly Election 2011: Gower
Party	Candidate	Constituency			Regional		
Party	Candidate	Votes	%	±%	Votes	%	±%
Labour	Edwina Hart	12,866	48.1	+13.9	10,234	38.2	
Conservative	Caroline Jones	8,002	29.9	+0.1	7,479	27.9	
Plaid Cymru	Darren Price	3,249	12.1	-6.4	3,369	12.6	
Liberal Democrats	Peter May	2,656	9.9	-0.7	2,027	7.6	
UKIP					1,147	4.3	
Green					867	3.2	
BNP					638	2.4	
Socialist Labour					556	2.1	
Welsh Christian					302	1.1	New
TUSC					134	0.5	New
Communist					62	0.2	
Majority		4,864	18.2	+17.8			
Turnout		26,773	43.1	−1.7			
Labour hold		Swing					

Regional ballots rejected: 188

=== Elections in the 2000s ===
Welsh Assembly Election 2007: Gower
Party	Candidate	Constituency			Regional		
Party	Candidate	Votes	%	±%	Votes	%	±%
Labour	Edwina Hart (Note: Incumbent member for this constituency)	9,406	34.2	-9.4	7,643		
Conservative	Byron Davies	8,214	29.8	+10.2	7,393		
Plaid Cymru	Darren Price	5,106	18.5	+3.8	4,610		
Liberal Democrats	Nicholas J. Tregoning	2,924	10.6	-1.1	2,622		
UKIP	Alex R. Lewis	1,895	6.9	-3.4	695		
Green					1,478		
BNP					1,369		New
Socialist Labour					302	0.	New
Welsh Christian					283		New
Keith James - Independent					160		New
Socialist Alternative (UK)					137		New
Respect					74	0.	New
Communist					71	0.	New
CPA					57	0.	New
Joel Jenkins - Independent					21		New
Majority		1,192	4.4	−19.6			
Turnout		27,545	44.8	+5.6			
Labour hold		Swing					

Welsh Assembly Election 2003: Gower
Party	Candidate	Constituency			Regional		
Party	Candidate	Votes	%	±%	Votes	%	±%
Labour	Edwina Hart	10,334	43.6	+8.2	7,972		
Conservative	Stephen R. James	4,646	19.6	+5.5	4,967		
Plaid Cymru	Sian M. Caiach	3,502	14.8	-9.2	3,825		
Liberal Democrats	Nicholas J. Tregoning	2,775	11.7	-0.1	2,857		
UKIP	Richard D. Lewis	2,444	10.3	New	1,788		
Green					1,406		
Socialist Labour					458		
Cymru Annibynnol					206		
ProLife Alliance					62	0.	
Majority		5,688	24.0	+12.6			
Turnout		24,143	39.9	−7.6			
Labour hold		Swing					

2003 Electorate: 60,523
Regional ballots rejected: 335

=== Elections in the 1990s ===
Welsh Assembly Election 1999: Gower
Party	Candidate	Votes	%	±%
Labour	Edwina Hart	9,813	35.4	N/A
Plaid Cymru	Dyfan Rhys Jones	6,653	24.0	N/A
Conservative	Aled D. Jones	3,912	14.1	N/A
Liberal Democrats	Howard W. Evans	3,260	11.8	N/A
Independent	Richard D. Lewis	2,307	8.3	N/A
Independent	Ioan M. Richard	1,755	6.3	N/A
Majority		3,160	11.4	N/A
Turnout		27,700	47.5	N/A
Labour win (new seat)				
