= Cardiff North (Senedd constituency) =

Senedd constituency (1999–2026)

Coordinates: 51.517°N 3.203°W

Cardiff North Gogledd Caerdydd
- Former Senedd borough constituency for the Senedd

- Cardiff North shown within the South Wales Central electoral region and the region shown within Wales

Former Senedd borough constituency
- Created: 1999
- Abolished: 2026
- Party: Labour
- MS: Julie Morgan
- Preserved county: South Glamorgan

Cardiff North (Welsh: Gogledd Caerdydd) was a constituency of the Senedd. It elected one Member of the Senedd by the first past the post method of election. Also, however, it was one of eight constituencies in the South Wales Central electoral region, which elected four additional members, in addition to eight constituency members, to produce a degree of proportional representation for the region as a whole.

== Boundaries ==
Map of 1999–2026 boundaries

The constituency was created for the first election to the Assembly, in 1999, with the name and boundaries of the Cardiff North Westminster constituency prior to the 2023 review of Westminster constituencies. It was entirely within the preserved county of South Glamorgan. To the north within the boundaries lay North Rural Cardiff and to the south lay the densely populated area of Whitchurch, Rhiwbina, Thornhill etc.

The other seven constituencies of the region were Cardiff Central, Cardiff South and Penarth, Cardiff West, Cynon Valley, Pontypridd, Rhondda and Vale of Glamorgan.

== Voting ==
In general elections for the National Assembly for Wales, each voter had two votes. The first vote was used to vote for a candidate to become the Assembly Member for the voter's constituency, elected by the first past the post system. The second vote was used to vote for a regional closed party list of candidates. Additional member seats were allocated from the lists by the d'Hondt method, with constituency results being taken into account in the allocation. In both the 2011 and 2016 elections, Julie Morgan won the highest number of votes of any candidate in any constituency in Wales.

== Assembly members ==
Election	Member	Party	Portrait
1999	Sue Essex	Labour	
2007	Jonathan Morgan	Conservative	
2011	Julie Morgan	Labour	

== Election results ==
=== Elections in the 2020s ===
2021 Senedd election: Cardiff North
Party	Candidate	Constituency			Regional		
Party	Candidate	Votes	%	±%	Votes	%	±%
Labour	Julie Morgan	19,348	47.6	+2.8	14,875	36.7	+2.5
Conservative	Joel Williams	12,755	31.8	-3.2	11,774	29.1	-0.3
Plaid Cymru	Fflur Elin	3,278	8.1	+2.0	5,711	14.1	+1.5
Green	Debra Cooper	1,957	4.8	+2.6	3,023	7.5	+4.4
Liberal Democrats	Rhys Taylor	1,641	4.0	+1.0	2,070	5.1	+0.1
Abolish	Lawrence Gwynn	990	2.4	New	1,467	3.6	-1.0
Propel	Akil Kata	336	0.8	New	441	1.1	New
Reform UK	Haydn Rushworth	200	0.5	New	240	0.6	New
Freedom Alliance	Virginia Kemp	150	0.4	New			
UKIP					409	1.0	-7.6
No More Lockdowns					163	0.4	New
Gwlad					98	0.2	New
Independent	Alan Coulthard				71	0.2	New
Communist					54	0.1	-0.1
TUSC					49	0.1	-0.1
Workers Party					41	0.1	New
Majority		6,593	15.8	+6.0			
Turnout		40,655	58.08	+1.3			
Labour hold		Swing					

=== Elections in the 2010s ===
2016 Welsh Assembly election: Cardiff North
Party	Candidate	Constituency			List		
Party	Candidate	Votes	%	±%	Votes	%	±%
Labour	Julie Morgan	16,766	44.8	−2.8	12,754	34.2	-3.2
Conservative	Jayne Cowan	13,099	35.0	−7.4	10,964	29.4	-6.9
UKIP	Haydn Rushworth	2,509	6.7	New	3,196	8.6	+4.6
Plaid Cymru	Elin Jones	2,278	6.1	+0.7	4,717	12.6	+4.4
Liberal Democrats	John Dixon	1,130	3.0	−1.6	1,852	5.0	-1.0
Independent	Fiona Burt	846	2.3	New			
Green	Chris von Ruhland	824	2.2	New	1,156	3.1	-0.6
Abolish					1,712	4.6	New
Women's Equality					421	1.1	New
Independent (Jonathan Bishop)					171	0.5	New
Monster Raving Loony					167	0.4	-0.1
TUSC					80	0.2	-0.1
Freedom to Choose / Vapers in Power					78	0.2	New
Communist					64	0.2	±0.0
Majority		3,667	9.8	+4.6			
Turnout		37,452	56.8	+4.9			
Labour hold		Swing	+2.3				

2011 Welsh Assembly election: Cardiff North
Party	Candidate	Constituency			Regional		
Party	Candidate	Votes	%	±%	Votes	%	±%
Labour	Julie Morgan	16,384	47.6	+16.7	12,846	37.4	+10.2
Conservative	Jonathan Morgan	14,602	42.4	-2.9	12,471	36.3	-2.7
Plaid Cymru	Ben Foday	2,836	5.4	-2.0	2,836	8.2	-0.9
Liberal Democrats	Matt Smith	1,595	4.6	-8.1	2,060	6.0	-6.8
UKIP					1,375	4.0	+2.0
Green					1,285	3.7	+0.2
Socialist Labour					494	1.4	+0.8
BNP					471	1.4	-1.6
Welsh Christian					250	0.7	-0.5
Monster Raving Loony					157	0.5	New
TUSC					92	0.3	New
Communist					54	0.2	-0.1
Majority		1,782	5.2	N/A			
Turnout		34,431	51.9	+0.6			
Labour gain from Conservative		Swing	+9.8				

Regional ballots rejected at the count: 214

=== Elections in the 2000s ===
2007 Welsh Assembly election: Cardiff North
Party	Candidate	Constituency			Regional		
Party	Candidate	Votes	%	±%	Votes	%	±%
Conservative	Jonathan Morgan	15,253	45.3	+5.9	13,122	39.0	+7.5
Labour	Sophie Howe	10,409	30.9	-4.3	9,140	27.2	-5.9
Liberal Democrats	Edward Bridges	4,287	12.7	+0.2	4,306	12.8	+0.9
Plaid Cymru	Wyn Jones	2,491	7.4	-2.3	3,056	9.1	-1.5
UKIP	Dai Llewellyn	1,262	3.7	-1.0	663	2.0	-2.9
Green					1,181	3.5	+0.1
BNP					1,010	3.0	New
Welsh Christian					410	1.2	New
Respect					139	0.4	New
Socialist Labour					214	0.6	-0.2
CPA					139	0.4	New
Socialist Alternative (UK)					120	0.4	New
Communist					99	0.3	+0.1
Socialist Equality					36	0.1	New
Majority		4,843	14.4	N/A			
Turnout		33,702	51.3	+8.4			
Conservative gain from Labour		Swing	+8.2				

2003 Welsh Assembly election: Cardiff North
Party	Candidate	Constituency			Regional		
Party	Candidate	Votes	%	±%	Votes	%	±%
Labour	Sue Essex	10,413	37.5	-1.2	8,732	31.5	-0.8
Conservative	Jonathan Morgan	9,873	35.6	+4.2	9,182	33.1	+4.3
Liberal Democrats	John L. Dixon	3,474	12.5	-3.6	3,795	13.7	-2.6
Plaid Cymru	Wyn Jones	2,679	9.7	-4.1	2,942	10.6	-0.6
UKIP	Donald E. Hulston	1,295	4.7	New	1,361	4.9	New
Green					950	3.4	Unknown
Socialist Labour					233	0.8	Unknown
Vote No 2 Stop the War					148	0.5	New
New Millennium Bean Party					109	0.4	New
ProLife Alliance					107	0.4	New
Cymru Annibynnol					95	0.3	New
Communist					67	0.2	Unknown
Majority		540	1.9	−5.4			
Turnout		27,734	43.9	−7.6			
Labour hold		Swing	-2.7				

2003 Electorate: 64,528
Regional ballots rejected: 328

=== Elections in the 1990s ===
1999 Welsh Assembly election: Cardiff North
Party	Candidate	Constituency			Regional		
Party	Candidate	Votes	%	±%	Votes	%	±%
Labour	Sue Essex	12,198	38.7	N/A	10,164	32.3	N/A
Conservative	Jonathan Morgan	9,894	31.4	N/A	9,061	28.8	N/A
Liberal Democrats	Alastair Meikle	5,088	16.1	N/A	5,133	16.3	N/A
Plaid Cymru	Colin Mann	4,337	13.8	N/A	5,343	17.0	N/A
Others					1,784	5.7	
Majority		2,304	7.3				
Turnout		31,517	51.5				
Labour win (new seat)							

1999 electorate: 61,253
